= Tunnel Vision (Justin Timberlake song) =

Single by Justin Timberlake

from the album The 20/20 Experience
- Released: June 14, 2013
- Recorded: May–July 2012
- Studio: Larrabee (North Hollywood)
- Genre: R&B
- Length: 6:46 (album version); 4:43 (radio edit)
- Label: RCA
- Songwriters: Justin Timberlake; Timothy Mosley; Jerome "J-Roc" Harmon; James Fauntleroy
- Producers: Timbaland; Justin Timberlake; Jerome "J-Roc" Harmon

Justin Timberlake singles chronology
"Mirrors" (2013)	"Tunnel Vision" (2013)	"Holy Grail" (2013)

Music video
- "Tunnel Vision" on YouTube

"Tunnel Vision" is a song by American singer Justin Timberlake from his third studio album, The 20/20 Experience (2013). The track was released on June 14, 2013, as the album's third and final single, through RCA Records. Timberlake wrote and produced the song alongside Timbaland and J-Roc, with additional writing from James Fauntleroy. It was also recorded at Larrabee Sound Studios, based in North Hollywood, California. The song is a mid-tempo R&B song with EDM influence and instrumentation featuring Timbaland's signature ad-libs, record-scratching, heavy drums, melodic bass, orchestration and synthesizer. Its lyrics proclaim Timberlake's tunnel vision for his love interest, with several voyeuristic references.

"Tunnel Vision" received generally positive reviews from music critics, most of whom praised Timbaland's production and cited it as a highlight of The 20/20 Experience. After the album's release, the song charted in South Korea and the United States due to strong digital sales. It debuted on the singles chart in South Korea at number 27, selling 6,670 digital copies in its first week. "Tunnel Vision" peaked at number 40 on the US Billboard Hot R&B/Hip-Hop Songs chart, and number eight on the UK R&B Singles Chart.

The accompanying music video for "Tunnel Vision", directed by Jonathan Craven, Simon McLoughlin, and Jeff Nicholas, premiered on July 3 on Timberlake's Vevo channel. In the seven-minute video, Timberlake and Timbaland watch nude women and dance. Critics labeled the video NSFW and compared it to the video for Robin Thicke's 2013 single, "Blurred Lines". Banned initially on YouTube, it was later posted with the condition that viewers disclose their age. The song was part of the set list for Timberlake's 2013 Legends of the Summer Stadium Tour with rapper Jay-Z and his fifth solo tour, The 20/20 Experience World Tour (2013–2015).

== Background ==
In September 2006, Timberlake released his second album, FutureSex/LoveSounds, which was a commercial success and received generally positive reviews from most music critics. The album spawned six singles, including the international hits "SexyBack", "My Love", and "What Goes Around... Comes Around". After wrapping up a worldwide concert tour to support the album in 2007, Timberlake took a break from his music career to focus on acting, with occasional guest appearances on several singles by Madonna, T.I., Jamie Foxx, Timbaland, and Esmée Denters.

Timberlake's music manager Johnny Wright approached him in 2010, discussing possibility of going back to his music career and the difficulties of releasing his future material, because according to Wright, "a lot of the physical record sellers were gone, by the time they've got music again they needed to think about different ways to deliver it". Wright proposed a promotion based on an application or releasing a new song every month. Timberlake, however, was not interested in returning to music; instead, he continued to focus on his film career. Around the "late part of May, first week in June" 2012, Timberlake invited Wright to dinner and revealed that he had spent the last couple of nights in the studio with Timbaland working on new material. Wright was shocked by the revelation, and the two immediately began planning how to promote and release the album. Ultimately, they agreed on a shorter period, seven or eight weeks, between the singles and the album. Wright told Billboard that "such a short window" demanded "a big impact".

In August 2012, producer Jim Beanz reported that Timberlake had started work on his new music project. Shortly after the announcement, Timberlake's publicist denied plans for a new album, stating Timberlake was instead working on Timbaland's upcoming project Shock Value III. Wright stated that although the project involved artists who are primarily Timberlake's friends, it was tough to keep it a secret, so they used codenames. Originally planned for release in October 2012, Timberlake's project was postponed because of his wedding to actress Jessica Biel. Timberlake revealed the track listing for The 20/20 Experience on February 6, 2013; "Tunnel Vision" was revealed as the fifth track. The album was released on March 15, 2013, via RCA Records.

== Composition ==
"Tunnel Vision"
A 30-second sample of "Tunnel Vision", a mid-tempo R&B song with EDM influences that features "sinister" synthesizer and Middle Eastern tones

"Tunnel Vision" was written by Timberlake, Timothy "Timbaland" Mosley, Jerome "J-Roc" Harmon, and James Fauntleroy, and produced by Timbaland, Timberlake, and Harmon. It is a mid-tempo R&B song with an EDM influence. Billboard's Jason Lipshutz noted that it has an instrumentation that features "fizzing beats abetted by the producer's [Timbaland] signature ad-libs and vocal record-scratches", while according to Sobhi Youssef of Sputnikmusic the song is built on "still-existing chops with a drum heavy, syncopated backbone amidst frenetically shifting bass melodies, sweeping orchestrations, and vacuous synths that all coalesce into a fuzzed out boom-bap." Ryan Dombal of Pitchfork called the synthesizer "sinister" and, according to Slant Magazine's Eric Henderson, it has Middle Eastern tones. Joey Guerra of the Houston Chronicle called the beats and vocal loops on "Tunnel Vision" reminiscent of Timbaland's past work with the late American singer Aaliyah. According to Sarah Dean of The Huffington Post, its beat resembles that on 50 Cent's 2007 single "Ayo Technology" (also featuring Timberlake).

"Tunnel Vision" features "thrilling" evolutions in production and arrangement complementing Timberlake's vocals, and the song's unusual, abrupt changes unite it throughout. It borrows the "dark alley" rhythm of The 20/20 Experience's third track, "Don't Hold the Wall"; Timberlake sings in his lower register, with an "exciting" upward arpeggio. Timbaland uses the singer's voice as a "flexible instrument to enhance his tech savvy soundscape", constructing "layers of production elements into towers of sonic force". Lauren Martin of Fact called the song the start of Timbaland's "Bollywood influenced 'Indian Flute' era" and a tease; Timberlake's voice is redistributed, with wider range and suspense.

The song's lyrics describe Timberlake's tunnel vision of his love interest, with several voyeuristic references. The singer professes his love: "I look around and everything I see is beautiful, because all I see is you." According to The Huffington Post's Dean, Timberlake is in a happier state of mind than on his 2002 song "Cry Me a River" or his 2007 single "What Goes Around... Comes Around". However, his lyrics have an obsessive quality: "A million people in a crowded room, but my camera lens is only set to zoom and it all becomes so clear." Mellisa Maerz of Entertainment Weekly wrote that on "Tunnel Vision", Timberlake is lyrically "playing the rom-com director": "Just like a movie shoot, I'm zoomin' in on you as we ride off into the sun." According to Mikael Wood of the Los Angeles Times, Timberlake uses references to "cameras and reflective surfaces" to reflect on the "changing nature of celebrity".

== Release ==
On June 10, 2013, Timberlake introduced the artwork for the "Tunnel Vision" single, a black-and-white close-up of the singer's face in the silhouette of a nude woman. Kia Macarechi of The Huffington Post found the artwork unpleasant and unusual; according to Justin Myers of the Official Charts Company, Timberlake "seems to be playing up to his naughty nickname of Trousersnake with the cover". Zach Dionne of New York's Vulture website called the cover "awful boobnose single art", committing to "the smoky naked woman vibe". "Tunnel Vision" and its radio edit were digitally released in France and Italy on June 14 on Amazon. That day, the single was also released in Australia, Belgium, Luxembourg, The Netherlands, New Zealand and Sweden on 7 Digital and the iTunes Store. It was released on June 17 in Norway, the following day in Spain and on June 21 in Switzerland.

== Reception ==
Consequence's Sarah H. Grant wrote that "Tunnel Vision" and "Don't Hold the Wall" were the album's highlights, similar to Timberlake's best work with 'NSYNC. Clyde Erwin Barretto of Prefix Magazine praised its production, which he felt excited listeners. The Huffington Post's Sarah Dean called "Tunnel Vision" her favorite track on the album. Jordan Sargent of Spin wrote that with the song, Timbaland proved that he could still produce otherworldly beats. In The Guardian, Kitty Empire wrote that Timbaland rejuvenated his production talents and "Kanye-calibre ambition".

In a less-enthusiastic review, Brad Stern of MTV Buzzworthy dismissed "Tunnel Vision" as "the album's most tediously grating moment". Allan Raible of ABC News praised the track's beat, but thought it would fit better on a song with fewer "tired 'loverman' clichés." Fact magazine's Lauren Martin described "Tunnel Vision" and "Don't Hold the Wall" as "two rousing, if mildly deja vu inducing, efforts." Jed Gottlieb of the Boston Herald said that the song's "electro bump" would have been innovative if it had been released a year earlier.

In North America, "Tunnel Vision" peaked at number eleven on the US Bubbling Under Hot 100, number forty on the US Hot R&B/Hip-Hop Songs chart, and number forty-six on the US Pop Digital Songs chart. In Europe, it peaked at number forty-nine on the Bubbling Under chart in the Flanders region of Belgium, but peaked at number forty-two on its urban chart. It also peaked at number seventy-five on the Irish Singles Chart, number sixty-one on the UK Singles Chart, and number eight on the UK Hip Hop and R&B Singles Chart. In Asia, the song peaked at number sixteen in Lebanon and number twenty-seven in South Korea. In Oceania, it peaked at number sixty-three in Australia and number twelve on its urban chart.

== Music video ==
=== Conception and fashion ===
Screenshot from the music video, in which Timberlake's face is projected on the women's nude bodies

"Tunnel Vision"'s music video premiered on July 3, 2013, on Timberlake's Vevo YouTube channel. The singer tweeted, "Check out the new video for Tunnel Vision and be ready...it's explicit. -teamJT". The video was directed by Jonathan Craven, Simon McLoughlin and Jeff Nicholas, with a cameo appearance by Timbaland. Craven and Nathan Scherrer produced the video for the Uprising Creative. Its director of photography was Sing Howe Yam, and Jacquelyn London edited the video for Sunset Edit.

The seven-minute video features Timberlake and Timbaland gazing at three nude women; according to Jason Lipshutz of Billboard, the women are wearing flesh-colored G-strings. In some shots, Timberlake's face is projected onto the women's bodies. Jordan Sargent of Spin called the set pieces where projections of Timberlake interact with the nude dancers "a fractured dynamic that mirrors 'Tunnel Vision' itself".

Cinya Burton of E! wrote about Timberlake's video wardrobe, "Apparently when Justin Timberlake isn't in his now-signature suit and tie getup, he's donning AllSaints." The singer wore two head-to-toe ensembles by the brand. The first was a gray Baxley V-neck T-shirt layered under a white Redono half-sleeved shirt, with casual Charge Chino pants. The second, a darker combination worn while he dances against a lighter background, was a black Resident Crew T-shirt, dark gray Pipe Chino pants, a Duncan denim shirt, and black Trap boots. According to Burton, "While his ensembles are both dapper", the nude models in the video attracted more attention.

=== Critical response and ban ===
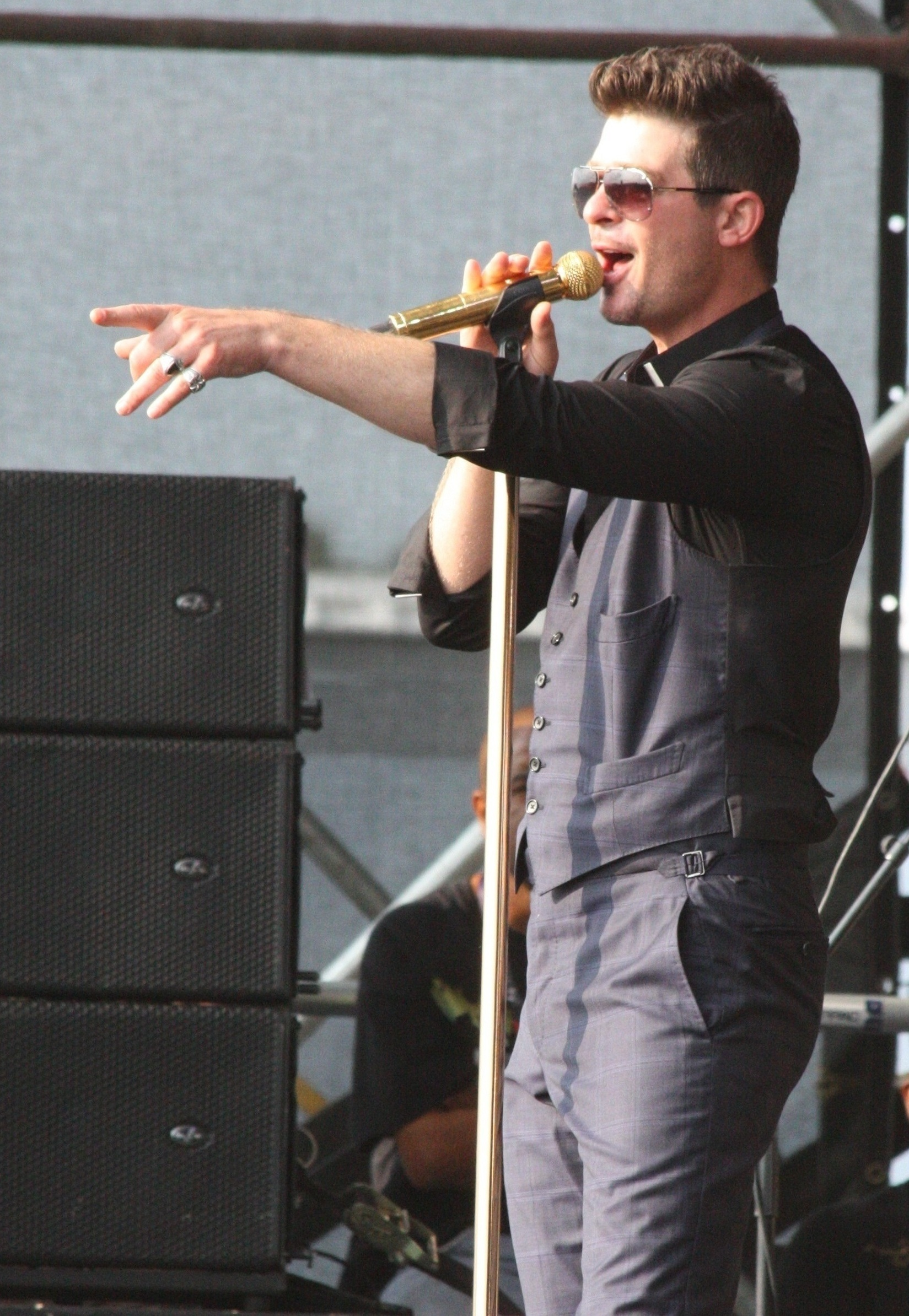
Critics have compared the "Tunnel Vision" video to the one for Robin Thicke's "Blurred Lines".

Critics have called the video NSFW, comparing it to the 2013 video for "Blurred Lines" by Robin Thicke with Pharrell Williams and T.I. In an interview with Capital FM, Thicke responded to a question about the videos' similarity: "No comment. I'll let you do all the talking. It's a subject that has no good ending." Fact magazine called the video's concept simple, and said its production team was unconcerned. According to Spin's Jordan Sargent, "Like his new album The 20/20 Experience, in which half the songs run longer than seven minutes, the 'Tunnel Vision' video is self-consciously artistic and mature. But the video is also at times effective, particularly when the editing gets choppier during the bridge."

About the nude women in the video, an MTV UK reviewer said that Timberlake drew on Thicke's video. According to Tamar Anitai of MTV Buzzworthy, Timberlake wanted to live his life and celebrate his album's success: "Oh, come on! Don't complain. You bitched and moaned endlessly when Justin Timberlake stopped making music for six years, so don't get all Veruca Salty when he comes back with boobs to spare and boobs to share."

In her review, Rachel Maresca of the New York Daily News wrote that Timberlake slurred some of the song's explicit lyrics in the video. According to Kathy McCabe of News Corp Australia, Timberlake escalated the pop-porn movement with the video: "With mummy blogger outrage over Robin Thicke's exploitation of topless women for his Blurred Lines video – and its questionable lyrics – still raging, Timberlake has gone even further in his clip". McCabe wrote that male pop singers have been influenced by Rihanna and Katy Perry, who have "stripped down in the name of a hit. Or art. Or freedom of expression, depending on the press release spin". Clash's Robin Murray wrote that pop music has lacked raunchiness and sex appeal for some time, and Timberlake's return was needed: "Lavish, lush and 21st century in a direct, shocking fashion, the video finds Justin Timberlake on perfect preening form."

After the video's release, it was banned from YouTube with a message saying, "This video has been removed as a violation of YouTube's policy on nudity or sexual content". The website quickly restored the video with a content warning and the requirement that viewers sign in (to verify their age). Although a YouTube representative declined to comment on individual videos, he issued a statement: "While our guidelines generally prohibit nudity, we make exceptions when it is presented in an educational, documentary or artistic context, and take care to add appropriate warnings and age restrictions".

== Live performances ==
Timberlake first performed "Tunnel Vision" at the Phoenix Park concert in Dublin, Ireland, as part of a set list which included "Cry Me a River", "SexyBack" and "My Love". In a review of the concert, John Balfe of entertainment.ie wrote: "Even the album's more well-known songs like 'Tunnel Vision', 'Mirrors' and 'Suit & Tie' don't yet have the same weight in the setlist as some of JT's more established hits and it was songs like 'SexyBack' that really got the 40,000 strong crowd to move". On July 12 Timberlake appeared on the main stage at the Queen Elizabeth Olympic Park in Stratford, London as part of the Wireless Festival, performing "Tunnel Vision" and other songs dressed in black and wearing a black fedora. The song was on the set lists of Timberlake's 2013 Legends of the Summer Stadium Tour with rapper Jay-Z and his fifth worldwide tour, the 2013–15 20/20 Experience World Tour.

== Credits and personnel ==
Credits are adapted from the liner notes of The 20/20 Experience.

Locations

- Vocals recorded and mixed at Larrabee Studios, North Hollywood, California

Personnel

- Timothy "Timbaland" Mosley – Producer, songwriter
- Justin Timberlake – Mixer, producer, songwriter, vocal producer, vocal arranger
- Jerome "J-Roc" Harmon – Keyboards, producer, songwriter
- James Fauntleroy – Songwriter
- Chris Godbey – Engineer, mixer
- Jimmy Douglass – Mixer
- Alejandro Baima – Assistant engineer
- Elliot Ives – Guitar

Video credits

- Jonathan Craven – Director, producer
- Simon McLoughlin – Director
- Jeff Nicholas – Director
- Nathan Scherrer – Producer
- The Uprising Creative – Production company
- Sing Howe Yam – Director of photography
- Jacquelyn London – Editor
- Sunset Edit – Editing company

== Charts ==
Chart performance
Chart (2013)	Peak position
Australia (ARIA)	63
Australia Urban (ARIA)	12
Belgium (Ultratip Bubbling Under Flanders)	49
Belgium Urban (Ultratop Flanders)	42
Ireland (IRMA)	75
Lebanon (The Official Lebanese Top 20)	16
South Korea (Gaon International Chart)	27
UK Singles (Official Charts)	61
UK Hip Hop/R&B (Official Charts)	8
US Bubbling Under Hot 100 (Billboard)	11
US Hot R&B/Hip-Hop Songs (Billboard)	40
US Pop Digital Songs (Billboard)	46

== Release history ==
Region	Date	Format	Label
Australia	June 14, 2013	Digital download	Sony
Belgium	June 14, 2013	Digital download	Sony
Denmark	June 14, 2013	Digital download	Sony
Finland	June 14, 2013	Digital download	Sony
France	June 14, 2013	Digital download	Sony
Italy	June 14, 2013	Digital download	Sony
Luxembourg	June 14, 2013	Digital download	Sony
Mexico	June 14, 2013	Digital download	Sony
Netherlands	June 14, 2013	Digital download	Sony
New Zealand	June 14, 2013	Digital download	Sony
Russia	June 14, 2013	Digital download	Sony
Sweden	June 14, 2013	Digital download	Sony
Norway	June 17, 2013	Digital download	Sony
Spain	June 18, 2013	Digital download	Sony
Switzerland	June 21, 2013	Digital download	Sony
United Kingdom	June 26, 2013	Contemporary hit radio	RCA
