= Pusher Love Girl =

2013 song by Justin Timberlake

Song by Justin Timberlake

from the album The 20/20 Experience
- Released: March 15, 2013
- Recorded: 2012
- Studio: Larrabee (North Hollywood)
- Genre: R&B
- Length: 8:02
- Label: RCA
- Songwriters: Justin Timberlake; Timothy Mosley; Jerome "J-Roc" Harmon; James Fauntleroy
- Producers: Timbaland; Justin Timberlake; Jerome "J-Roc" Harmon

"Pusher Love Girl" is a song by American singer Justin Timberlake from his third studio album, The 20/20 Experience (2013). Timberlake co-wrote and co-produced the song with Timbaland and J-Roc, with James Fauntleroy providing additional songwriting. The song became available as the album's opening track on March 15, 2013, when it was released by RCA Records. An ode to the "intoxicating effects" of love and sex, "Pusher Love Girl" is a slow-tempo R&B song that goes through several stylistic shifts during its eight-minute duration. It opens with an orchestral intro before moving into its "funky main section". The song concludes with an outro in which Timberlake raps over futuristic hip-hop beats, comparing several narcotics to the love of his significant other.

"Pusher Love Girl" received generally positive reviews from music critics, many of whom regarded it as one of the best songs on The 20/20 Experience. Some, however, were critical of the song's length and certain lyrics. In North America, "Pusher Love Girl" peaked at number 64 on the US Billboard Hot 100 and number 21 on the US Hot R&B/Hip-Hop Songs chart. In Europe, it peaked at number 122 on the UK Singles Chart and number 20 on the UK Hip Hop and R&B Singles Chart. In Asia, it peaked at number 15 on the Gaon Chart in South Korea. Timberlake included "Pusher Love Girl" on the set lists for three of his concert tours: the Legends of the Summer Stadium Tour (2013), The 20/20 Experience World Tour (2013–2015), and The Forget Tomorrow World Tour (2024–2025). At the 56th Annual Grammy Awards (2014), the song won the award for Best R&B Song.

== Background and chart performance ==
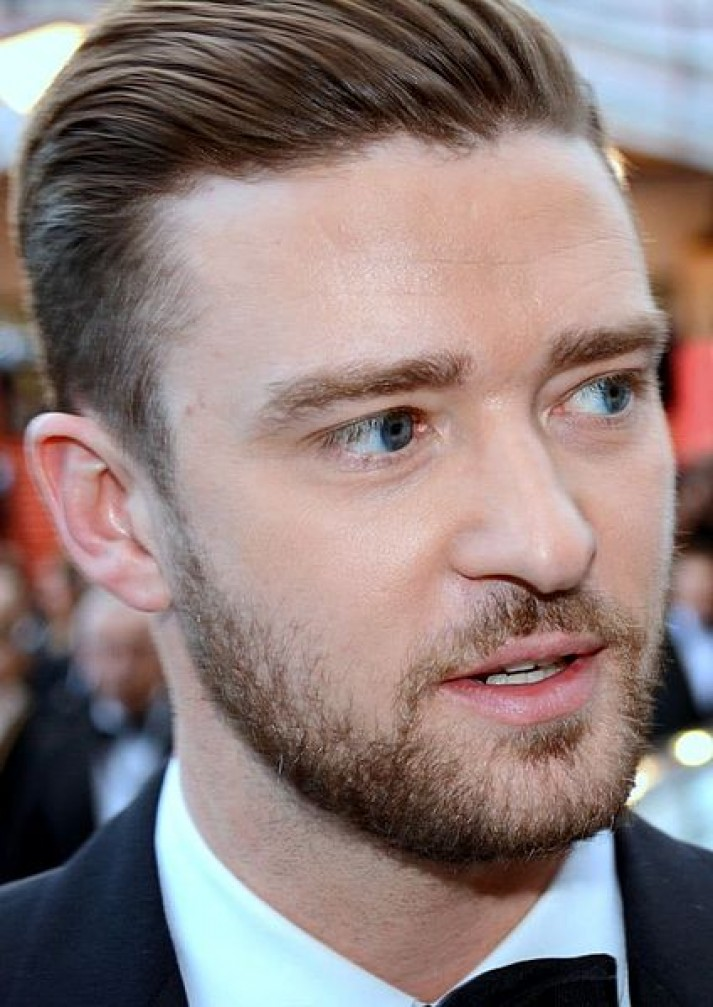
Timberlake in 2013

Timberlake wrote and recorded his third studio album in late May and early June and concluded in July 2012. The project was produced in a span of 20 days. In August 2012, producer Jim Beanz reported Timberlake had started work on his new music project. Shortly after the announcement, Timberlake's publicist denied plans for a new album, stating Timberlake was working on Timbaland's upcoming project, Shock Value III. Originally planned for release in October 2012, Timberlake's project was postponed because of his wedding to actress Jessica Biel. Timberlake's manager, Johnny Wright, stated that although Timbaland's project involved artists who were Timberlake's friends, keeping it a secret was difficult, so they used codenames.

Timberlake co-wrote and co-produced the song "Pusher Love Girl" with Timbaland and J-Roc, with James Fauntleroy providing additional songwriting. He released "Suit & Tie" as the lead single from the album, entitled The 20/20 Experience, on January 14, 2013. Timberlake announced the album's tracklist, which included "Pusher Love Girl" as the opening track, on February 6, 2013. It became available for digital download on The 20/20 Experience, which was released on March 15. In North America, "Pusher Love Girl" peaked at number 64 on the US Billboard Hot 100 and number 21 on the US Hot R&B/Hip-Hop Songs chart. In Europe, it peaked at number 122 on the UK Singles Chart and number 20 on the UK Hip Hop and R&B Singles Chart. In Asia, it peaked at number 15 on the Gaon Chart in South Korea.

== Composition ==
"Pusher Love Girl"
A 27-second sample of the spoken-word outro to "Pusher Love Girl", which features Timberlake rapping "Childish Gambino style" over futuristic hip-hop beats.

"Pusher Love Girl" is a slow-tempo R&B song lasting exactly eight minutes and two seconds. The song "simmers" on an "elastic" soul groove that contains "retro-synth" hooks, hand claps, horns, and a "squelchy" bass line. Jason Lipshutz of Billboard called the song "a more seasoned version" of "Señorita", the opening track of Timberlake's debut album, Justified (2002). The song is an ode to the "intoxicating effects" of love and sex.

Norman Fleischer of Nothing but Hope and Passion described "Pusher Love Girl" as having a "smooth string start", while Nate Jones of Popdust cited its introduction as being "straight from a Hollywood classic". Allan Raible of ABC News wrote that the "stringed fanfare" is something one would expect to hear on the red carpet of an awards ceremony. Jim Farber of the New York Daily News called the opening "classic enough" for Michael Jackson. After the "sweeping" orchestral intro, the song transitions into a "funky main section", which, according to Helen Brown of The Daily Telegraph, is a "sweet slice of funk-soul seduction".

Five minutes into the song, "Pusher Love Girl" morphs into a spoken-word outro where Timberlake raps "Childish Gambino style" over futuristic hip-hop beats. Timberlake compares narcotics, such as heroin, cocaine, plum wine, MDMA and nicotine, to the love of his significant other. Kitty Empire, writing for The Observer, commented that Timberlake's list of narcotics sound "tempting". Youssef wrote that the outro enhances the atmosphere and "cross-genre" feel that Timberlake and Timbaland wanted, while also "building on and completing the ideas" that Frank Ocean experimented with on his debut album, Channel Orange (2012). Mikael Wood of the Los Angeles Times wrote that Timberlake raps with "surprising authority".

=== Vocal style ===
Writing for the Houston Chronicle, Joey Guerra stated that Timberlake "hits that unmistakable falsetto" from the first chorus of "Pusher Love Girl". Sobhi Youssef of Sputnikmusic noted that the song introduces Timberlake's "beautiful" falsetto at "the apex of his game". MusicOMH's David Meller wrote that Timberlake's vocals "retained some of its boyish appeal but now has a measured, kind of sophisticated charm", while Sean Daly of the Tampa Bay Times declared that the "street-savvy middle range" of Timberlake's vocals further separates him from his boy band start with NSYNC.

According to Brown, in "Pusher Love Girl", Timberlake sounds like he "inhaled" 1970s Stevie Wonder, "breathing it out" as it "disperses into something spacily 21st century". Rolling Stone reviewer Jody Rosen noted that Timberlake borrows Curtis Mayfield's falsetto and Wonder's chord changes in the song. Jed Gottlieb of the Boston Herald wrote that Timberlake "snatches swagger" from Wonder, Marvin Gaye and Al Green soul "with dashes of Frank Sinatra swing and Prince's heavy breathing". Empire wrote that "Walt Disney meets Quincy Jones" on "Pusher Love Girl" and that the song rivals English space rock band Spiritualized for "dovetailing affection with addiction".

== Critical reception ==
MSN Music's Robert Christgau cited "Pusher Love Girl" as a highlight of The 20/20 Experience, while Genevieve Koski of The A.V. Club called it the best track on the album. Billboard writer Jason Lipshutz called the song an "extended glide", commenting that even though the song includes some dubious lyrics, Timberlake's "easy delivery will leave listeners hopelessly, er, addicted". Jean Bentley of Hollywood.com wrote that the intro to "Pusher Love Girl" is "very much in tune" with the "retro-soul vibe" of Timberlake's recent live performances. She wrote that it is one of the catchiest songs on The 20/20 Experience and commented that it "most certainly" would be his "second or third single" from the album. The Boston Globe reviewer James Reed wrote that "Pusher Love Girl" begins the album on a "blissed-out high".

Nate Jones of Popdust praised the album version of "Pusher Love Girl" for improving on the version performed at the 55th Annual Grammy Awards. He commented that the "instrumental thump, slightly plodding in the live versions, tightens up until it's propelling the song forward" with an "elephantine self-assurance", clearing "enough space" for Timberlake's Prince impersonation to work "out its sweet shimmy". Allan Raible of ABC News described "Pusher Love Girl"'s lyrics as "very calculated" and said that the drug references are meant to give Timberlake, an artist who "somehow lives in a Tiger Beat bubble", "edge". Raible wrote that in the song, Timberlake is "supposed to be the bad boy with the pseudo-'50s smile and the charm to match", a comparison that was "tired" when Roxy Music used it in 1975. He concluded by stating that it is "past even being a dead horse by now".

Other writers expressed unfavorable opinions. Writing for the Toronto Star, Nick Krewen dismissed "Pusher Love Girl" as a "dull dirge" of a song that "plods along at a midtempo slog lasting five minutes, before a false ending and equally dull coda drag our carcasses another 400 meters after its initial impact". Robert Copsey of Digital Spy wrote that "Pusher Love Girl" begins "perky enough", but that it is "hard to justify" its length when it feels repetitive after the first three minutes and "self-indulgent thereafter". HitFix reviewer Melinda Newman highlighted the lyric "hydroponic jelly bean", asking, "Is there anyone else on God's green earth that could pull off calling someone that?"

== Live performances ==
Timberlake premiered "Pusher Love Girl" as part of the set list for his comeback performance at DirecTV's Super Saturday Night in New Orleans on February 2, 2013. Timberlake next performed the song live at the 55th Annual Grammy Awards on February 11, for which he received a standing ovation. Brad Wete of Billboard ranked Timberlake's performance at the ceremony as one of the night's best. He also performed the song live at the Late Night with Jimmy Fallon on March 12 and at the SXSW MySpace Secret Show on March 17. During the performance of the latter, Timberlake danced at "full tilt", while "owning his own signature falsetto like a seasoned maestro conducting a symphony orchestra", as noted by Maurice Bobb, a writer for MTV News.

Timberlake performed "Pusher Love Girl" alongside "Mirrors" on The Ellen DeGeneres Show on April 25, 2013. As noted by Jon Blistein, a writer for Rolling Stone, he performed the former with "a small squadron of suit-and-tie-clad back up dancers". Timberlake performed the song on the first day of the Wireless Festival in London on July 12. The song was also included in the set lists for Timberlake and Jay-Z's co-headlining Legends of the Summer Stadium Tour (2013), The 20/20 Experience World Tour (2013–2015), and The Forget Tomorrow World Tour (2024–2025). He also included it on the set list of his NPR Tiny Desk Concert on March 15, 2024.

== Accolades ==
Organization	Year	Category	Result	Ref.
Grammy Awards	2014	Best R&B Song	Won	

== Credits and personnel ==
Credits are adapted from the liner notes of The 20/20 Experience.

=== Locations ===
- Vocals recorded and mixed at Larrabee Studios, North Hollywood, California
- Horns and strings recorded at EastWest Studios, Los Angeles, California

=== Musicians ===
- Timothy "Timbaland" Mosley – producer, songwriter
- Justin Timberlake – mixer, producer, songwriter, vocal producer, vocal arranger
- Jerome "J-Roc" Harmon – keyboards, producer, songwriter
- James Fauntleroy – songwriter
- Benjamin Wright – strings
- The Benjamin Wright Orchestra – strings
- Elliott Ives – guitar
- The Regiment – horns

=== Technical ===
- Chris Godbey – engineer, mixer
- Jimmy Douglass – mixer
- Alejandro Baima – assistant engineer
- Reggie Dozler – horns and strings recorder

== Charts ==
Chart performance for "Pusher Love Girl"
Chart (2013)	Peak position
South Korea (Gaon)	15
UK Singles (Official Charts)	122
UK Hip Hop/R&B (Official Charts)	20
US Billboard Hot 100	64
US Hot R&B/Hip-Hop Songs (Billboard)	21
