= Strawberry Bubblegum =

Song by Justin Timberlake

from the album The 20/20 Experience
- Released: March 15, 2013
- Recorded: June 2012
- Studio: Larrabee (North Hollywood)
- Genre: Pop; R&B
- Length: 7:59
- Label: RCA
- Songwriters: Justin Timberlake; Timothy Mosley; Jerome "J-Roc" Harmon; James Fauntleroy
- Producers: Timbaland; Justin Timberlake; Jerome "J-Roc" Harmon

"Strawberry Bubblegum" is a song by American singer Justin Timberlake from his third studio album The 20/20 Experience (2013). It was written and produced by Timberlake, Timothy "Timbaland" Mosley and Jerome "J-Roc" Harmon, with additional writing from James Fauntleroy. "Strawberry Bubblegum" is a mid-tempo pop, R&B and soul song with elements of EDM and ambient. Its music structure received comparison to the works of musicians such as Barry White, Prince, and Stevie Wonder.

Music critics were divided on "Strawberry Bubblegum"; the song's production was generally praised, but the lyrics were criticized as being cliché. Despite the mixed reactions from reviewers, the song debuted at number 22 on the singles chart in South Korea, upon the release of The 20/20 Experience. It also peaked at number 34 and 38 on the UK R&B Singles Chart and US Hot R&B/Hip-Hop Songs chart, respectively. Timberlake performed "Strawberry Bubblegum" for the first time on Late Night with Jimmy Fallon on March 15, 2013.

== Background ==
In September 2006, Timberlake released his second album, FutureSex/LoveSounds, which was a commercial success and received generally positive reviews from most music critics. The album spawned six singles, including the international hits "SexyBack", "My Love", and "What Goes Around... Comes Around". After wrapping up a worldwide concert tour to support the album in 2007, Timberlake took a break from his music career to focus on acting, with occasional guest appearances on several singles by Madonna, T.I., Jamie Foxx, Timbaland, and Esmée Denters.

Timberlake's music manager Johnny Wright approached him in 2010, discussing possibility of going back to his music career and the difficulties of releasing his future material, because according to Wright, "a lot of the physical record sellers were gone, by the time they've got music again they needed to think about different ways to deliver it". Wright proposed a promotion based on an application or releasing a new song every month. Timberlake, however, was not interested in returning to music; instead, he continued to focus on his film career. Around the "late part of May, first week in June" 2012, Timberlake invited Wright to dinner and revealed that he had spent the last couple of nights in the studio with Timbaland working on new material. Wright was shocked by the revelation, and the two immediately began planning how to promote and release the album. Ultimately, they agreed on a shorter period, seven or eight weeks, between the singles and the album. Wright told Billboard that "such a short window" demanded "a big impact".

In August 2012, producer Jim Beanz reported that Timberlake had started work on his new music project. However, at that time, shortly after the announcement, Timberlake's publicist revealed that there were no current plans for a new Timberlake album, affirming that Timberlake was instead working on Timbaland's upcoming project Shock Value III. Wright stated that although the project involved artists who are primarily Timberlake's friends, it was tough to keep it a secret, so they used codenames. Originally planned for release in October 2012, Timberlake's project was postponed because of his wedding to actress Jessica Biel. Timberlake revealed the track listing for The 20/20 Experience on February 6, 2013; "Strawberry Bubblegum" was revealed as the fourth track. The album was released on March 15, 2013, by RCA Records.

== Composition ==
"Strawberry Bubblegum"
A 30-second sample of "Strawberry Bubblegum", a pop and R&B song with a combination of slick grooves and psychedelic soul. It features electronic blips, string movements, and upbeat percussion breaks.

"Strawberry Bubblegum" was written by Timberlake, Timothy "Timbaland" Mosley, Jerome "J-Roc" Harmon, and James Fauntleroy, and produced by Timbaland, Timberlake, and Harmon. It is characterized as a pop song by HitFix's Melinda Newman and an R&B song by Billboard magazine's Jason Lipshutz. Jean Bentley of Hollywood.com found the song influenced by electro, while Pitchfork's Ryan Dombal said that it evokes music by Barry White, Sly Stone, and Drake's "ambient R&B" style. According to Mikael Wood of the Los Angeles Times, the song transitions from a stark electro song to an amiable keyboard vamp comparable to Stevie Wonder's 1973 song "You Are the Sunshine of My Life". The song features electronic blips, string movements, and upbeat percussion breaks. Mesfin Fekadu of Times Colonist wrote that the song is "smooth, airy and full of sexual innuendoes, and it transitions into something that's heaven-like." Timberlake sings in a falsetto voice and refers to a mature woman as his strawberry bubblegum in the song's lyrics. Joey Guerra of The Houston Chronicle remarked that the eccentric song recalls the work of Prince. Helen Brown of The Daily Telegraph attributed the song's relaxing style to how it samples Barry White, while Lauren Martin of Fact found the song to be in the style of Frank Ocean.

"Strawberry Bubblegum" begins with the sound of a stylus dropping on a vinyl record. The line "Hey, pretty lady" is declared by a deep voice, and Timberlake sings "This goes out to you!". ABC News reporter Allan Raible wrote that "such a move seems engineered to make gullible teen girls in the audience scream". The lyrics feature daft double-entendres and are complemented by spoken-word background vocals. MusicOMH's David Meller wrote that the song's transition into "'70s funk-cum-porno keyboards" is likable, but may seem ridiculous to many listeners. The string loops and the record scratches on the song complete "the faux-vintage" vibe of "Strawberry Bubblegum". Raible concluded that it attempts to sound like Michael Jackson's 2002 song "Butterflies" because of its delicate tone. According to Clyde Erwin Barretto of Prefix Mag, "Strawberry Bubblegum" takes its R&B style in a more avant-garde direction, but its second half is more classic-sounding. Jason Lipshutz called the outro "sashaying" and "pleasant".

Timberlake sings about the girl's many characteristics and sensual qualities, and proclaims that he will love her until they "make it pop". The Boston Globe's James Reed wrote that the lyrics are silly, but irresistible, while Sarah Dean of The Huffington Post found "Strawberry Bubblegum" as seductive as its title, but according to her, "if you had too much of it you might end up feeling a little sick". Additionally, Timberlake sings lyrics about he has "recipe for a good time". Genevieve Koski of The A.V. Club felt that the lyrics' sense of humor is somewhat similar to "Pop" by 'NSYNC.

== Critical reception ==
Mesfin Fekadu of the Times Colonist called "Strawberry Bubblegum" an "eight-minute event" and one of the album's standout songs. Sean Daly of the Tampa Bay Times wrote that the song is "best enjoyed on satin sheets". Clyde Erwin Barretto of Prefix Mag wrote that "as the name suggests", the song is "as sweet as it sounds". Kitty Empire of The Observer wrote that the "surface silliness" of the song "deepens to a feeling of respect a few plays in, when the penny drops, and everything suddenly makes sense". Mesfin Fedaku, music editor of Associated Press, compiled a list of the "Top 25 Songs of the Decade", ranking the track at number 13.

Robert Copsey of Digital Spy wrote that while "Strawberry Bubblegum" is musically "rich and rewarding", the lyrics are "embarrassingly cliché". According to VH1's Bené Viera, one would expect a cliché such as "Strawberry Bubblegum" to "fall flat". He wrote that Timberlake's falsettos "make it almost cute" to hear a "grown man referring to a grown woman as his strawberry bubblegum". He concluded that envisioning Timberlake perform on stage at a "small juke joint on Bill Street" is not "far fetched". Lauren Martin of Fact wrote that "if you're going to release an eight minute song with only two verses and a hook", singing the words "strawberry" and "bubblegum" 34 and 20 times respectively "begins to grate". Jed Gottlieb of The Boston Herald wrote that "Strawberry Bubblegum" is a "killer vamp" without a "killer change to hook us". Tom Hawking of Flavorwire found the verses "Little girl won't you be my strawberry bubblegum/ Then I'd be your blueberry lollipop/ And then I'd love you 'til I'll make you pop" to be offensive. Hawking added that when comparing the vagina to strawberry bubblegum it sounded both "creepy" and "ridiculous" and criticized the "penis-as-lollipop metaphor".

== Live performances ==
Timberlake performed "Strawberry Bubblegum" for the first time on Late Night with Jimmy Fallon on March 15, 2013. Wearing varsity baseball-style jackets, Timberlake and his backup singers "shook and finger-snapped" through the song, according to Rachel Brodsky of MTV Buzzworthy. "Building upon the performance's sports theme", additional backup dancers later joined them onstage in full baseball uniforms. Brodsky suggested that the choice of wearing baseball hats and striped pants could "have something to do with baseball players and their penchant for chewing [bubble]gum".

== Credits and personnel ==
Credits are adapted from the liner notes of The 20/20 Experience.

Locations

- Vocals recorded and mixed at Larrabee Studios, North Hollywood, California

Personnel

- Timothy "Timbaland" Mosley – producer, songwriter
- Justin Timberlake – Mixer, producer, songwriter, vocal producer, vocal arranger
- Jerome "J-Roc" Harmon – keyboards, producer, songwriter
- James Fauntleroy – songwriter
- Chris Godbey – engineer, mixer
- Jimmy Douglass – mixer
- Alejandro Baima – assistant engineer
- Elliot Ives – guitar

== Charts ==
Chart performance
Chart (2013)	Peak position
France (SNEP)	172
South Korea (Gaon)	22
UK Singles (OCC)	193
UK Hip Hop/R&B (OCC)	34
US Bubbling Under Hot 100 (Billboard)	6
US Hot R&B/Hip-Hop Songs (Billboard)	38
