= Don't Hold the Wall =

Song by Justin Timberlake

from the album The 20/20 Experience
- Released: March 15, 2013
- Recorded: 2012
- Studio: Larrabee (North Hollywood)
- Genre: R&B
- Length: 7:10
- Label: RCA
- Songwriters: Justin Timberlake; Timothy Mosley; Jerome "J-Roc" Harmon; James Fauntleroy
- Producers: Timbaland; Justin Timberlake; Jerome "J-Roc" Harmon

"Don't Hold the Wall" is a song by American singer Justin Timberlake from his third studio album, The 20/20 Experience (2013). Timberlake wrote and produced the song alongside Timbaland and J-Roc, with James Fauntleroy providing additional songwriting. The song became available as the album's third track on March 15, 2013, when it was released by RCA Records. An R&B song, "Don't Hold the Wall" has tribal chants, "oozing" vocal samples, tribal drums, rainsticks, "spacious drums", and a "pseudo-Indian" beat.

"Don't Hold the Wall" received mixed reviews from music critics. In North America, it peaked at number 4 on the US Bubbling Under Hot 100 and number 37 on the US Hot R&B/Hip-Hop Songs chart. In Asia, it debuted at number 34 on the Gaon Chart in South Korea. On March 31, 2016, Canadian entertainment company Cirque du Soleil filed a lawsuit against Timberlake, claiming that Timbaland sampled one of their compositions, "Steel Dream" from Quidam (1997), without permission.

== Background and chart performance ==
Timberlake started writing and recording for his third studio album in late May and early June and concluded in July 2012. The project was produced in a span of 20 days. In August 2012, producer Jim Beanz reported Timberlake had started work on his new music project. Shortly after the announcement, Timberlake's publicist denied plans for a new album, stating Timberlake was working on Timbaland's upcoming project, Shock Value III. Timberlake's project was originally planned for release in October 2012, but it was postponed because of his wedding to actress Jessica Biel. Timberlake's manager, Johnny Wright, stated that although Timbaland's project involved artists who were Timberlake's friends, keeping it a secret was difficult, so they used codenames.

Timberlake co-wrote and co-produced the song "Don't Hold the Wall" with Timbaland and J-Roc, with James Fauntleroy providing additional songwriting. He released "Suit & Tie" as the lead single from the album, entitled The 20/20 Experience, on January 14, 2013. Timberlake announced the album's tracklist, which included "Don't Hold the Wall" as the third track, on February 6, 2013. It became available for digital download on The 20/20 Experience, which was released on March 15. In North America, "Don't Hold the Wall" peaked at number 4 on the US Bubbling Under Hot 100 and number 37 on the US Hot R&B/Hip-Hop Songs chart. In Asia, it debuted at number 34 on the Gaon Chart in South Korea.

== Composition ==
"Don't Hold the Wall"
A 24-second sample of the beginning verse to "Don't Hold the Wall", blending hip-hop, Bollywood, and Bhangra.

According to Joey Guerra of the Houston Chronicle, "Don't Hold the Wall" "rides a hypnotic, sensual groove", featuring tribal chants and "oozing" vocal samples. Tribal drums, rainsticks, "spacious drums" and a "pseudo-Indian" beat are also present.

"Don't Hold the Wall" begins a "gorgeous sounding" the Beach Boys-like chorus, according to David Meller of MusicOMH. Jean Bentley of Hollywood.com compared the a cappella introduction to that of Timberlake's former boy band, NSYNC. It then shifts into a mix of hip-hop, Bollywood and Bhangra music. Four minutes and twenty seconds in, "Don't Hold the Wall" transcends "darker, more muscular structure", according to Billboard's Jason Lipshutz. It concludes with drum and bass loops and vocoder backing vocals. Timberlake commands the object of his affection to "give in" to her "physical impulses". Timbaland chants, "Dance... Don't hold the wall", in a voice that sounds "as if it is coming through a broken phone receiver", according to Allan Raible of ABC News. As noted by Lipshutz, Timbaland's production on it is "the star" of The 20/20 Experience. He wrote that "there are so many things happening" in it that it takes five listens just to "process them".

== Critical reception ==
Consequence's Sarah H. Grant wrote that "Don't Hold the Wall" and "Tunnel Vision" were the album's highlights, similar to Timberlake's best work with NSYNC. In a less-enthusiastic review, Fact magazine's Lauren Martin described it and "Tunnel Vision" as "two rousing, if mildly deja vu inducing, efforts". Writing for ABC News, Allan Raible called it a "sparse, hand-clap jam" that does not warrant its seven-minute length, even with its "marginally interesting breakdown".

== Lawsuit ==
On March 31, 2016, Canadian avant-garde circus troupe Cirque du Soleil filed a lawsuit against Timberlake claiming that Timbaland sampled one of their compositions, "Steel Dream" from Quidam (1997), without permission. The suit, filed in a New York federal court, sought a minimum of $800,000 (£560,000) in copyright infringement damages, with Sony Music Entertainment, co-writers Harmon and Fauntleroy, Universal Music, and Warner Music Group named as defendants. American brewing company Anheuser-Busch was also named after using it in a beer advertisement. In September 2016, Cirque du Soleil notified the court that they and the defendants had tentatively agreed to a confidential settlement.

== Credits and personnel ==
Credits are adapted from the liner notes of The 20/20 Experience.

=== Locations ===
- Vocals recorded and mixed at Larrabee Studios, North Hollywood, California

=== Personnel ===
- Timothy "Timbaland" Mosley – producer, songwriter
- Justin Timberlake – Mixer, producer, songwriter, vocal producer, vocal arranger
- Jerome "J-Roc" Harmon – keyboards, producer, songwriter
- James Fauntleroy – songwriter
- Chris Godbey – engineer, mixer
- Jimmy Douglass – mixer
- Alejandro Baima – assistant engineer
- Elliot Ives – guitar

== Charts ==
Chart performance for "Don't Hold the Wall"
Chart (2013)	Peak position
South Korea (Gaon)	24
US Bubbling Under Hot 100 (Billboard)	4
US Hot R&B/Hip-Hop Songs (Billboard)	37
