= Hindsight (book) =

Autobiography by Justin Timberlake

Hindsight & All the Things I Can't See in Front of Me
- Author: Justin Timberlake
- Genre: Autobiography
- Publisher: Harper Design
- Publication date: October 30, 2018 (US)
- Publication place: United States
- Media type: Print (Hardcover); E-book
- Pages: 288 (Standard edition)
- ISBN: 9780062448309

Hindsight & All the Things I Can't See in Front of Me is an autobiographical book by Justin Timberlake. It is presented as a curated personal collection of observations, memories, and photographs. The book was officially announced on August 10, 2018, and was released on hardcover on October 30, 2018, through Harper Design.

The book has reached number two on The New York Times Hardcover Nonfiction best-sellers list.

== Content ==
Timberlake's editor, Elizabeth Sullivan, called the book "experiential", saying, "it's a highly designed mix of stories, memories, musings, and personal images. You can open it up anywhere, read a vignette, or look at a series of photographs or wild graphics. But in the end, the elements combine to create an exciting portrait of an artist and human being."

The book covers episodes of his personal and professional life, including his childhood, The All-New Mickey Mouse Club, NSYNC, the beginning of his solo career, his internal songwriting process, struggles, the creation and inspiration behind several of his songs, such as "Cry Me a River", "SexyBack", "Can't Stop the Feeling!", "Mirrors" and "Say Something", Saturday Night Live, skits with Jimmy Fallon, Jessica Biel and his son, Silas.

== Release history ==
Country	Release date	Edition	Publisher	Ref.
Australia	October 29, 2018	Hardback	Virgin Books	
United States	October 30, 2018	Hardback	Harper Design	
United Kingdom	November 1, 2018	Hardback	Virgin Books	
Australia	November 1, 2018	E-book	Virgin Digital	
