= Legends of the Summer Stadium Tour =

2013 concert tour by Justin Timberlake and Jay-Z

- Tour by Justin Timberlake and Jay-Z
- Location: North America
- Associated albums: The 20/20 Experience; Magna Carta Holy Grail
- Start date: July 17, 2013
- End date: August 16, 2013
- Legs: 1
- No. of shows: 14
- Box office: $75.3 million ($104.08 million in 2025 dollars)

Justin Timberlake concert chronology
- FutureSex/ LoveShow; (2007); Legends of the Summer Stadium Tour; (2013); The 20/20 Experience World Tour; (2013–15)
Jay-Z concert chronology
- Watch the Throne Tour
- (2011–12)
- Legends of the Summer Stadium Tour
- (2013)
- Magna Carter World Tour
- (2013–14)

The Legends of the Summer Stadium Tour was a co-headlining concert tour by American singer-songwriter Justin Timberlake and American rapper Jay Z. The tour supported Timberlake's third studio album, The 20/20 Experience (2013) and Jay Z's twelfth studio album, Magna Carta Holy Grail (2013). The tour began on July 17, 2013, in Toronto, and concluded on August 16, 2013, in Miami Gardens. Overall, the duo performed to 622,559 fans in two countries.

The tour received generally positive reviews from critics, who highlighted the strong on-stage chemistry between Timberlake and Jay-Z, the lengthy setlist with smooth pacing, and the show's spectacle. However, some reviewers gave mixed opinions on the overall impact of the performance. Commercially, it grossed US$75.3 million (US$101.64 million in 2024 dollars). With all 14 dates sold out, it was the fifteenth highest-grossing tour of 2013.

== Background ==
After a six-year musical hiatus, on January 14, 2013, Timberlake released "Suit & Tie", the lead single from the singer's third studio album, The 20/20 Experience which featured American rapper Jay-Z. Before the 2013 Grammy Awards ceremony, Ryan Seacrest interviewed Timberlake and teased him about a possible joint tour with another artist. On that, Timberlake responded, "We are still putting it together, but it's gonna be a lot of fun. I don't know how much I should say."

During the award ceremony, Timberlake was joined by Jay-Z at the stage for the performance of "Suit & Tie". Following their appearance on Grammys, rumors of a stadium tour between the artists were raised as a result of Jay-Z's posts on his Life + Times blog; he posted series of venues with the note "#LegendsOfSummer this week". The Legends of the Summer tour was officially announced on February 22, 2013, when North American dates were revealed. The show started on July 17, 2013, in Toronto, Canada. The tickets for the show went on sale on February 28, with the pre-sale starting on February 27. Citi cardmembers had access to pre-sale tickets beginning on Friday, February 22, at 12 noon local time through Citi's Private Pass Program.

On July 14, 2013, Timberlake and Jay-Z performed at the Olympic Park in London, United Kingdom as part of the Wireless Festival for a "special preview" of the tour.

== Critical reception ==
Billboard's Karen Bliss, after attending the Toronto's Rogers Centre date, thought "there was no one-upmanship, just camaraderie, not competition, two guys that work well together". James Reed of The Boston Globe, who attended the show at Fenway Park, said, "At nearly two and a half hours, it was a tightly choreographed show, but there was no shortage of spectacle or unbridled joy." Greg Kot of the Chicago Tribune, who attended the show at Soldier Field, said that "the contrast between the eager-to-please R&B entertainer and the imperious hip-hop godfather couldn't have been more stark". Alex Young and Michael Roffman of Consequence reviewed the Soldier Field show, with Young stating that "the show was cohesive in the sense that the structure of the setlist never really made for an awkward transition", while Roffan said, "This was a damn worthy summer blockbuster". Nick Catucci of Entertainment Weekly, who attended the show at Yankee Stadium, said that "the cheery, elastic Timberlake is an excellently goofy foil to Jay's forbidding cool — if these two were superheroes instead of mere legends, Timberlake would be Robin to Jay Z's Batman".

Michael Mann of The Georgia Straight, who attended the show at BC Place, said, "Thankfully, the pair didn't linger too long on their latest musical offerings, which, let's face it, blow. On the obligatory four-storey-high stage, which featured massive LED screens and 18 or so backup performers that you couldn't care less about, JT and J-Hova treated those in attendance to a two-hour-and-15-minute-long hit parade". Rebecca Ford of The Hollywood Reporter, who attended the show at the Rose Bowl, noted that although Timberlake and Jay-Z had differing performance styles, both were "larger-than-life performers even in that massive a venue". Stephanie Cary of the Los Angeles Daily News, who also attended the show at the Rose Bowl, said, "Neither star deviated much from the music, only stopping a few times to address the audience, including Timberlake announcing it was the best crowd they've had so far on the tour. There were no hijinks, no backup dancers on stage or pyrotechnics. It was all about the music." The Miami Herald, who attended the show at Sun Life Stadium, said, "The Legends of the Summer show runs at a lengthy two and a half hours with nearly 40 songs (some full-length, others abbreviated). Friday night, the show felt exceptionally well-paced. The transitions were seamless between collaborations and solo efforts".

Piet Levy of the Milwaukee Journal Sentinel, who attended the show at Soldier Field, said, "But legends Jay Z and Timberlake are not, nor could the show, be considered a legendary evening of entertainment". Jim Farber of the New York Daily News, who attended the show at Yankee Stadium, noted that "clever mash-ups like this gave the night a thrilling fluidity, creating a one-on-one superstar match that clicked". Dan Warry-Smith of Relix, who attended the show at Rogers Centre, noted that "the legends in question may be preaching to the converted, but their gospel is pretty hard to refute". Jeff Rosenthal from Rolling Stone, who attended the show at Yankee Stadium, highlighted the great chemistry between both artists: "Watching Justin Timberlake and Jay Z interact onstage it feels like the two have forever been friends and collaborators". Anupa Mistry of Spin, who attended the show at Rogers Centre, noted that it is "far more casual: a convivial, loosely orchestrated, two-and-a-half-hour stadium revue".

Laura Pearson of Time Out, who attended the show at Soldier Field, said it "doesn't make a ton of sense, but it entertains in its flashy ambition and moments of unintended comedy". Jane Stevenson of the Toronto Sun, who attended the show at Rogers Centre, said, "Legendary? Not quite. Highly entertaining, most definitely". Celine Wong of USA Today, who also attended the show at Rogers Centre, asked, "What happens when a singer with the best-selling album of this year and a rapper with the current No. 1 album join forces to co-headline a North American stadium tour?", and said the results are "legendary". Francois Marchand of the Vancouver Sun, who attended the show at BC Place, noted that it "had all the flair of a self-congratulatory victory lap -- more "New York Yankees ego trip" than "Brooklyn Dodgers underdog feel-good story"". Luke Fox of Vibe, who attended the show at Rogers Centre, noted that it "favors elegance over excess. The lighting and splashes of video—in keeping with the aesthetic of Magna Carta and 20/20—complement the songs, but there are no fireworks or roll calls of dead MCs or gratuitous video interludes. There are too many smash songs to be heard".

== Set list ==
The following set list is representative of the Pasadena show on July 28, 2013. It does not represent all concerts during the tour.

1. "Holy Grail"
2. "I Just Wanna Love U (Give It 2 Me)"
3. "Rock Your Body"
4. "I Want You Back"
5. "Izzo (H.O.V.A.)"
6. "Excuse Me Miss"
7. "Señorita"
8. "On to the Next One"
9. "Like I Love You"
10. "My Love"
11. "Big Pimpin'"
12. "Tunnel Vision"
13. "Jigga What, Jigga Who"
14. "U Don't Know"
15. "99 Problems"
16. "Public Service Announcement"
17. "Hard Knock Life (Ghetto Anthem)"
18. "Heart of the City"
19. "Pusher Love Girl"
20. "Summer Love"
21. "LoveStoned"
22. "Until the End of Time"
23. "Cry Me a River"
24. "Take Back the Night"
25. "What Goes Around... Comes Around"
26. "Dirt off Your Shoulder"
27. "Niggas in Paris"
28. "Tom Ford"
29. "New York, New York"
30. "Empire State of Mind"
31. "Mirrors"
32. "Run This Town"
33. "Encore"
34. "SexyBack"
35. "Suit & Tie"
36. "Young Forever"

== Tour dates ==
List of concerts
Date	City	Country	Venue	Opening act	Attendance	Revenue
July 17, 2013	Toronto	Canada	Rogers Centre	DJ Cassidy	47,221 / 47,221	$5,440,288
July 19, 2013	New York City	United States	Yankee Stadium	DJ Cassidy	89,023 / 89,023	$12,928,598
July 20, 2013	New York City	United States	Yankee Stadium	DJ Cassidy	89,023 / 89,023	$12,928,598
July 22, 2013	Chicago	United States	Soldier Field	DJ Cassidy	52,671 / 52,671	$6,136,393
July 26, 2013	San Francisco	United States	Candlestick Park	DJ Cassidy	55,359 / 55,359	$5,507,409
July 28, 2013	Pasadena	United States	Rose Bowl	DJ Cassidy	63,162 / 63,162	$7,597,545
July 31, 2013	Vancouver	Canada	BC Place	DJ Cassidy	40,181 / 40,181	$5,160,984
August 4, 2013	Hershey	United States	Hersheypark Stadium	DJ Cassidy	29,135 / 29,135	$3,371,474
August 6, 2013	Detroit	United States	Ford Field	DJ Cassidy	42,035 / 42,035	$4,260,593
August 8, 2013	Baltimore	United States	M&T Bank Stadium	DJ Cassidy	49,668 / 49,668	$5,074,762
August 10, 2013	Boston	United States	Fenway Park	DJ Cassidy	68,251 / 68,251	$9,465,359
August 11, 2013	Boston	United States	Fenway Park	DJ Cassidy	68,251 / 68,251	$9,465,359
August 13, 2013	Philadelphia	United States	Citizens Bank Park	DJ Cassidy	39,487 / 39,487	$4,636,751
August 16, 2013	Miami Gardens	United States	Sun Life Stadium	DJ Cassidy	46,366 / 46,366	$5,744,515
Total					622,559 / 622,559	$75,324,671
