= Suit & Tie =

2013 single by Justin Timberlake featuring Jay-Z

Single by Justin Timberlake featuring Jay-Z

from the album The 20/20 Experience
- Released: January 14, 2013
- Recorded: June 2012
- Studio: Larrabee (North Hollywood)
- Genre: R&B; soul
- Length: 5:26 (album version); 4:29 (radio edit)
- Label: RCA
- Songwriters: Justin Timberlake; Timothy "Timbaland" Mosley; Shawn Carter; Jerome "J-Roc" Harmon; James Fauntleroy; Terrence Stubbs; Johnny Wilson; Charles Still
- Producers: Timbaland; Justin Timberlake; Jerome "J-Roc" Harmon

Justin Timberlake singles chronology
"3-Way (The Golden Rule)" (2011)	"Suit & Tie" (2013)	"Mirrors" (2013)

Jay-Z singles chronology
"Clique" (2012)	"Suit & Tie" (2013)	"Bitch, Don't Kill My Vibe" (2013)

Music video
- "Suit & Tie" on YouTube

"Suit & Tie" is a song by American singer Justin Timberlake featuring American rapper Jay-Z from the former's third studio album, The 20/20 Experience (2013). Written and produced by Timberlake, Timbaland, and J-Roc, with additional writing from James Fauntleroy and Jay-Z, it contains a portion of the 1972 song "Sho' Nuff" by Sly, Slick and Wicked, whose members are credited as co-writers as a result. A mid-tempo R&B and soul song, it incorporates a drawl, slowed-down synths, and "slightly out of time" drum claps, similar to the chopped and screwed remixing style. Lyrically, it is an ode to the joys of "being handsome and well-dressed".

Released on January 14, 2013, as the lead single from The 20/20 Experience, "Suit & Tie" received mixed-to-positive reviews from music critics, who praised its production and Timberlake's vocal performance but were divided on its impact as a comeback single. It became a commercial success, selling 315,000 first-week downloads in the US and surpassing the 250,000 debut of "SexyBack" in 2006, becoming Timberlake's highest-sales week for a download at the time until the release of "Can't Stop the Feeling!" in 2016. It peaked at number three on the US Billboard Hot 100, the UK singles chart, and the Canadian Hot 100. By 2018, it had sold 3.3 million downloads in the US.

The accompanying music video, directed by David Fincher, was shot on January 25, 2013, and released on Timberlake's Vevo page on Valentine's Day 2013. Timberlake and Jay-Z promoted "Suit & Tie" with performances at the DirecTV Super Saturday Night, the 55th Annual Grammy Awards, Saturday Night Live, the SXSW MySpace Secret Show, and the 2013 MTV Video Music Awards. Additionally, it was included on the set lists for four of the former's concert tours: the Legends of the Summer Stadium Tour (2013), the 20/20 Experience World Tour (2013–2015), the Man of the Woods Tour (2018–2019), and the Forget Tomorrow World Tour (2024–2025).

== Background ==
In September 2006, Timberlake released his second album, FutureSex/LoveSounds, which was a commercial success and received generally positive reviews from music critics. The album spawned six singles, including the US number-one singles "SexyBack", "My Love", and "What Goes Around... Comes Around". After wrapping up a worldwide concert tour to support the album in 2007, Timberlake took a break from his music career to focus on acting, with occasional guest appearances on several singles by Madonna, T.I., Jamie Foxx, Timbaland, and Esmée Denters.

Timberlake's music manager Johnny Wright approached him in 2010, discussing possibility of going back to his music career and the difficulties of releasing his future material, because according to Wright, "a lot of the physical record sellers were gone, by the time they've got music again they needed to think about different ways to deliver it". Wright proposed a promotion based on an application or releasing a new song every month. Timberlake, however, was not interested in returning to music; instead, he continued to focus on his film career. Around the "late part of May, first week in June" 2012, Timberlake invited Wright to dinner and revealed that he had spent the last couple of nights in the studio with Timbaland working on new material. Wright was shocked by the revelation, and the two immediately began planning how to promote and release the album. Ultimately, they agreed on a shorter period, seven or eight weeks, between the singles and the album. Wright told Billboard that "such a short window" demanded "a big impact".

In August 2012, producer Jim Beanz reported that Timberlake had started work on his new music project. Shortly after the announcement, Timberlake's publicist denied plans for a new album, stating Timberlake was instead working on Timbaland's upcoming project Shock Value III. Wright stated that although the project involved artists who are primarily Timberlake's friends, it was tough to keep it a secret, so they used codenames. Originally planned for release in October 2012, Timberlake's project was postponed because of his wedding to actress Jessica Biel.

== Composition ==
"Suit & Tie"
A 25-second sample of "Suit & Tie", which features Timberlake singing over Timbaland's "shiny collection" of percussion, featuring finger clicks and old-school horn blasts that add a layer of sophistication.

"Suit & Tie" was written by Timberlake, Timothy "Timbaland" Mosley, Shawn Carter, Jerome "J-Roc" Harmon, and James Fauntleroy, and produced by Timbaland, Timberlake, and Harmon; it contains a portion of "Sho' Nuff", written by Terrence Stubbs, Johnny Wilson, and Charles Still of Sly, Slick and Wicked. It is a mid-tempo R&B and soul song. Written in the key of D major, Timberlake's vocal range spans from E_{4} to B_{5}. It is a dance-oriented track that incorporates stop-and-start sections, resembling his debut single "Like I Love You" (2002). Lyrically, it is "an ode to the joys of being handsome and well-dressed". The song begins with a slow intro comprising drawl, sluggish synths and "slightly out of time" drum claps. After a brief pause it settles into a "rolling, laidback" groove, featuring Timbaland's "shiny collection" of percussions, finger clicks, and old-school horns that add a layer of sophistication. It then goes into a "hypnotic, engaging outro before a great, cold ending".

Mickey Woods of Glamour said "Suit & Tie" "is filled to the brim with horns, addictive hooks, and unprecedented swagger", while Jim Farber of the New York Daily News wrote that it is in the "classic" style of Curtis Mayfield, yet "isn't in any way conventionally retro". Dan Hyman of NBC News described "Suit & Tie" as "a horn-addled shuffler likely to inspire many new dance routines", while Billy Johnson Jr. of Yahoo Music said it "offers a more mature sound saturated in a live band feel with trumpets, saxophones, bass guitar, chimes and cowbells that recall the rich soul music of the '70s". Brian Mansfield of USA Today described it as having a "seductive swirl of synths and horn riffs", while Zach Dionne of Vulture noted it starts with "45 seconds of slow groove" before "dipping into an atmospheric, horn-padded Timbaland beat that'll set necks swiveling and bodies moving this week and long beyond". According to Tom Breihan of Stereogum, the song is "slick and aspirational dancefloor R&B that sounds like Timberlake's nod toward the godawful-boring mid-2000s grown-and-sexy moment", while Adam Tait of Gigwise described it as "a smooth and sexy piece of R&B that captures a slight taste of hip-hop thanks to the appearances of Timbaland and Jay-Z".

Zack O'Malley Greenburg of Forbes noted "Timberlake's breezy vocals atop a swirly tickling of piano keys and occasional bursts of brass and bass", while Luke Morgan Britton of The Line of Best Fit noted it "shows off JT's signature falsetto, some epic trumpeteering, Jay-Z slowing things down a bit and Timbaland's ever-crisp production". Andy Kellman of AllMusic noted the song "draws from early- to mid-'70s soul instead of late-'70s disco-funk, decked out in horns, marimba, and harp", while Melinda Newman of HitFix said it "floats along" like a song from The Whispers, but Timbaland's production pays homage without sounding dated.

== Release ==
In early January 2013, via his official Twitter account, Timberlake posted, "I think I'M READY" and later tweeted a link to a YouTube video explaining his absence from music. In the minute-long video, a camera follows Timberlake as he walks through a recording studio, while his voice-over explains it has been so long since his last album because he is not interested in releasing anything he does not love. The video closes with Timberlake entering a recording booth, putting on headphones, and saying, "I'm ready". Subsequently, on the singer's official site, a countdown leading up to Monday, January 14, at 12 am. ET appeared, prompting speculation about the release of a new single and album to break Timberlake's hiatus. That timing coincided with a tweet that Power 105.1 radio personality Charlamagne posted, saying, "Justin, Jay-Z Timbaland. New record Monday".

"Suit & Tie" was released by RCA Records on January 14, 2013, and was promoted as the lead single from Timberlake's third studio album, The 20/20 Experience, released on March 15, 2013. Additionally, Timberlake collaborated with social media platform Myspace for the site's relaunch on January 15. The site's front page featured an image of Timberlake in a suit and tie, and Myspace offered to stream or download "Suit & Tie" to those who signed up for or logged in to Myspace. Eliot Van Buskirk of Evolver.fm wrote that by doing this, Timberlake "appears to be sending a message to other artists about what the new Myspace is for: posting music for free, and trying to upsell it to downloads".

== Critical reception ==
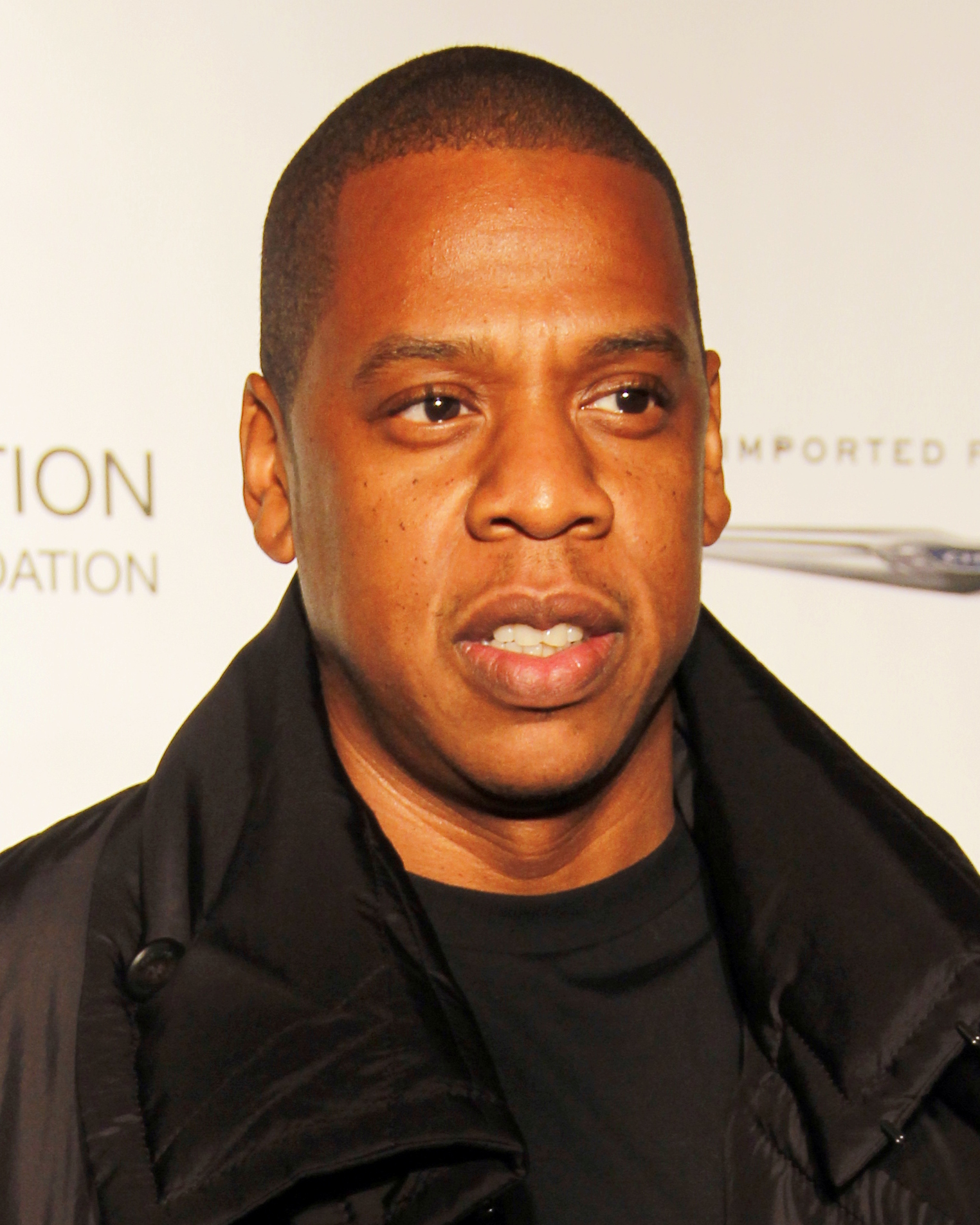
Jay-Z's contribution on "Suit & Tie" received mixed reviews.

Upon release, "Suit & Tie" received mixed-to-positive reviews from music critics. Andy Kellman of AllMusic gave it three out of five stars, stating it "serves the same flirty dancefloor purpose" as "Rock Your Body". Andrew Halverson of Beats Per Minute said the song "seems to point to the notion that JT still knows what he's doing". Deb Doing Dallas of the Dallas Observer called it "just one song off an album that is entirely capable of making up for this sleepy release". A reviewer from The Independent wrote that Timberlake's voice appears to have "gone up an octave" since he last released new music. The reviewer also compared "Suit & Tie" to "Rock Your Body" and "SexyBack". August Brown of the Los Angeles Times called it "a radiant, ramshackle song that's less of a coherent single and more of a coronation event". Melinda Newman of HitFix said to "leave it to Timberlake" to represent R&B in a way that "few contemporary artists are today", noting Bruno Mars and Miguel as exceptions.

Rebecca Twomey of Marie Claire said: "It appears it's been worth the wait too as Justin is posed to shake-up the charts with his new sound". Stephen Deusner of Pitchfork awarded "Suit & Tie" the website's Best New Track tag, praising Timberlake's vocal performance and Timbaland's production by saying: "Timbaland creates a smooth beat out of a marimba roll and harp glissando that Marvin Gaye must have left on the cutting-room floor, and Timberlake rides it with that fluid, effortless falsetto". Deusner, however, called the feature verse from Jay-Z "another in a string of uninspired cameos", but said it could not "sink [the song's] slinky vibe". Jody Rosen of Rolling Stone gave it three-and-a-half out of five stars, and said it "is natty—as expertly tailored and crisply pressed as a high-end tux". Chris Martins of Spin said: "Timberlake's voice sounds stronger than ever—smoother, more rounded, pretty, mature". Vogue Australia said: "While not ground-breaking by any means, its the perfect track for summer soirees and will please his legion of pop-loving fans".

Jason Lipshutz of Billboard gave "Suit & Tie" three-and-a-half out of five stars, and said it "is a good song, but it's not the artifact from another planet that we've been expecting, nor it is the ambitious experiment that Timberlake alludes to when he describes heading into the studio and 'just creating with no rules'". Ernest Wilkins of Chicago Tribune said the song "sounds like it was conceived, recorded, funded, and sponsored by a department store that hasn't been relevant in a long time". Michael Cragg of The Guardian wrote that it feels like the work of someone "luxuriating in the fact they're making music again" rather than someone "desperate to redefine pop in the face of its recent club-related slump". He stated it is not a "sound-redefining, statement-making, globe-conquering comeback single" like "SexyBack", but "more of a midway point" between his previous singles "Señorita" and "Summer Love". Nate Jones of Popdust gave it three-and-a-half out of five, and said to "think of it as an homage to Jay-Z's wife, as a thank you for Jay guesting on a song about Justin's own better half".

Ann Powers of NPR described "Suit & Tie"'s swagger as "Don Draper swagger, a testimony to the value of the pose". Joseph R. Atilano of Philippine Daily Inquirer said it "might just be a case of him being away too long from the music scene which could have resulted in, just maybe, Justin losing a step or two". Popjustice called the song "officially, and very disappointingly, mediocre", and said "it could make a decent third single from an album, if they were struggling". Sal Cinquemani of Slant Magazine said the song "is more filler than killer, more informal reintroduction than explosive comeback". Eight editors from Spin—Charles Aaron, Christopher R. Weingarten, David Marchese, David Bevan, Caryn Ganz, Brandon Soderberg, Philip Sherburne, and Marc Hogan—gave it mixed scores ranging from five to seven out of ten, with an average score of 6.25.

=== Accolades ===
Organization	Year	Category	Result	Ref.
Grammy Awards	2014	Best Pop Duo/Group Performance	Nominated	
Teen Choice Awards	2013	Choice Music Single – Male	Nominated	

== Commercial performance ==
Within days of its release, "Suit & Tie" reached number one on the iTunes Store in 31 different countries, while charting in the top ten in 54 others. It debuted at number 84 on the Billboard Hot 100 based on two days of airplay in the week ending January 26, 2013. It also debuted at number 14 on Billboard's Pop Songs chart with 6,045 plays, the highest detections total by a new entry in the chart's history. In the United Kingdom, it debuted at number 3. By June 2013, "Suit & Tie" had sold 300,000 copies in the United Kingdom.

The following week, "Suit & Tie" jumped to number four on the Billboard Hot 100 with 315,000 first-week downloads sold. It was Timberlake's highest sales week for a download, surpassing the 250,000 debut of "SexyBack" in 2006, but later bested by "Can't Stop the Feeling!" in 2016 with 379,000. "Suit & Tie" then fell to number 13 for two weeks, but returned to the top 10 on the week of February 10, 2013 after Timberlake performed it at the 2013 Grammy Awards. It reached a new peak at number 3 on the Billboard Hot 100 in its eleventh week due to the album release. It reached the number one position on Billboard's Rhythmic Airplay chart in its April 1, 2013, issue. By March 2014, it had sold 3,044,000 downloads in the United States. By 2018, it had accumulated 4.6 million units in the country, combining sales (3.3 million downloads) and equivalent streams.

== Music video ==
=== Overview ===
The music video for "Suit & Tie" features a "dapper" Timberlake performing while he "slips on his appropriate tux and settles into a smooth performance" with his orchestra, the Tennessee Kids.

On February 1, 2013, it was revealed that David Fincher would direct the video for "Suit & Tie". Previously, Timberlake starred in Fincher's 2010 drama film The Social Network. The music video was shot in Los Angeles on January 25, 2013. It was released on Timberlake's Vevo page on Valentine's Day 2013. Entirely black-and-white, it begins with Timberlake eating cereal while Jay-Z sits on a couch watching television, before cutting to a club where a "dapper" Timberlake "slips on his appropriate tux and settles into a smooth performance" with his orchestra, the Tennessee Kids. Another scene shows Timberlake performing in a studio and an art deco-style theater replete with a "swanky nightclub band", "sexy backup dancers", "female fans bopping to the beat", and a horn section.

=== Accolades ===
Pitchfork ranked "Suit & Tie" among the best music videos of 2013 and half-of-the-decade. Rolling Stone named it the third best video of 2013. Tom Breihan of Stereogum placed it at number eighteen in a ranking of the top twenty-five music videos of 2013. Melissa Locker of Time also ranked it among the eleven best music videos of 2013.

Organization	Year	Category	Result	Ref.
Grammy Awards	2014	Best Music Video	Won	
MTV Video Music Awards	2013	Best Collaboration	Nominated	
MTV Video Music Awards	2013	Best Direction	Won	

== Lawsuit ==
On January 7, 2016, it was reported that two members of Sly, Slick and Wicked had filed a lawsuit against Universal Music Group, claiming that, although the sample in "Suit & Tie" had been cleared, the rights in the original vocal performances were not. Despite getting paid for the horns from "Sho' Nuff", the band members claimed that they were not paid for the licensing and promotions that used "Suit & Tie", including a Bud Light commercial. Anheuser-Busch was also included in the lawsuit for using the song in a Budweiser commercial.

Although the group's copyright claims were dismissed by US District Judge Paul A. Engelmayer as untimely in 2017, the United States Court of Appeals for the Second Circuit reversed the decision in a unanimous ruling. US Circuit Judge Pierre N. Leval wrote that Engelmayer "reasoned that the claims were time‐barred because the defendants had repudiated plaintiffs' claims of copyright ownership many years earlier, during the initial copyright terms".

== Live performances ==
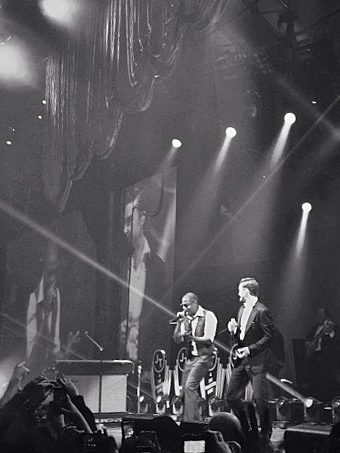
Timberlake and Jay-Z performing "Suit & Tie" at the Legends of the Summer Stadium Tour

Timberlake and Jay-Z performed "Suit & Tie" live for the first time at the DirecTV Super Saturday Night on February 2, 2013. They both performed it at the 55th Annual Grammy Awards, where Timberlake also performed "Pusher Love Girl". Brad Wete of Billboard ranked Timberlake's performance at the ceremony as one of the night's best. Timberlake presented "Suit & Tie" with Jay-Z and "Mirrors" on Saturday Night Live on March 9, and solo at the SXSW MySpace Secret Show on March 17. On August 25, Timberlake accepted the Michael Jackson Video Vanguard Award at the 2013 MTV Video Music Awards, preceded by a medley of his songs, including "Suit & Tie".

"Suit & Tie" was also included in the set lists for Timberlake and Jay-Z's co-headlining Legends of the Summer Stadium Tour (2013), The 20/20 Experience World Tour (2013–2015), The Man of the Woods Tour (2018–19), and The Forget Tomorrow World Tour (2024–2025). In addition, it was featured on the set list for three editions of Rock in Rio in 2013, 2014, and 2017. Part of the song was included in Timberlake's Super Bowl LII halftime show performance in 2018, and featured the University of Minnesota Marching Band wearing black tuxedos while playing backup instrumentals.

== Credits and personnel ==
Credits are adapted from the liner notes of The 20/20 Experience.

Locations

- Vocals recorded and mixed at Larrabee Studios, North Hollywood, California
- Engineered at Jungle City Studios, New York City, New York

Musicians

- Timothy "Timbaland" Mosley – producer, songwriter
- Justin Timberlake – mixer, producer, songwriter, vocal producer, vocal arranger
- Jerome "J-Roc" Harmon – keyboards, producer, songwriter
- James Fauntleroy – songwriter
- Shawn Carter – songwriter
- Elliott Ives – guitar

Technical

- Chris Godbey – engineer, mixer
- Jimmy Douglass – mixer
- Matt Weber – assistant engineer

Samples

- Contains a portion of "Sho' Nuff", written by Terrence Stubbs, Johnny Wilson, and Charles Still, and performed by Sly, Slick and Wicked

== Charts ==
=== Weekly charts ===
Weekly chart performance for "Suit & Tie"
Chart (2013)	Peak position
Australia (ARIA)	9
Australia Urban (ARIA)	2
Austria (Ö3 Austria Top 40)	36
Belgium (Ultratop 50 Flanders)	9
Belgium (Ultratop 50 Wallonia)	13
Brazil Hot 100 Airplay (Billboard Brasil)	46
Canada Hot 100 (Billboard)	3
Canada AC (Billboard)	42
Canada CHR/Top 40 (Billboard)	9
Canada Hot AC (Billboard)	8
Czech Republic Airplay (ČNS IFPI)	34
Denmark (Tracklisten)	1
Euro Digital Song Sales (Billboard)	2
France (SNEP)	8
Germany (GfK)	25
Greece Digital Song Sales (Billboard)	9
Hungary (Rádiós Top 40)	11
Iceland (RÚV)	11
Ireland (IRMA)	16
Israel International Airplay (Media Forest)	4
Italy (FIMI)	29
Italian Airplay (EarOne)	5
Japan Hot 100 (Billboard)	4
Luxembourg Digital Song Sales (Billboard)	8
Mexico (Billboard Ingles Airplay)	31
Mexico Anglo (Monitor Latino)	16
Netherlands (Dutch Top 40)	18
Netherlands (Single Top 100)	10
New Zealand (Recorded Music NZ)	14
Scottish Singles Sales (Official Charts)	7
Slovakia Airplay (ČNS IFPI)	34
South Korea International (Gaon)	1
Spain (Promusicae)	17
Switzerland (Schweizer Hitparade)	31
UK Singles (Official Charts)	3
UK Airplay (Nielsen)	9
UK Hip Hop/R&B (Official Charts)	3
US Billboard Hot 100	3
US Adult Pop Airplay (Billboard)	8
US Adult R&B Songs (Billboard)	9
US Dance Airplay (Billboard)	7
US Dance Club Songs (Billboard)	22
US Hot R&B/Hip-Hop Songs (Billboard)	2
US Pop Airplay (Billboard)	4
US Rhythmic Airplay (Billboard)	1

=== Year-end charts ===
Year-end chart performance for "Suit & Tie"
Chart (2013)	Position
Australia Streaming (ARIA)	85
Canada Hot 100 (Billboard)	58
France (SNEP)	120
Hungary (Rádiós Top 40)	63
Japan Hot 100 (Billboard)	24
Netherlands (Dutch Top 40)	115
UK Singles (OCC)	53
US Billboard Hot 100	20
US Adult Pop Airplay (Billboard)	37
US Dance/Mix Show Airplay (Billboard)	29
US Hot R&B/Hip-Hop Songs (Billboard)	4
US Pop Airplay (Billboard)	28
US Rhythmic Airplay (Billboard)	9

== Certifications ==
Certifications and sales for "Suit & Tie"
Region	Certification	Certified units/sales
Australia (ARIA)	Platinum	70,000^{^}
Brazil (Pro-Música Brasil)	2× Platinum	120,000^{‡}
Canada (Music Canada)	2× Platinum	160,000^{*}
Italy (FIMI)	Gold	15,000^{‡}
Mexico (AMPROFON)	Platinum	60,000^{*}
New Zealand (RMNZ)	Platinum	15,000^{*}
South Korea	—	243,545
United Kingdom (BPI)	Platinum	600,000^{‡}
United States (RIAA)	2× Platinum	3,300,000
Streaming
Denmark (IFPI Danmark)	Platinum	1,800,000^{†}
^{*} Sales figures based on certification alone.^{^} Shipments figures based on certification alone.^{‡} Sales+streaming figures based on certification alone.^{†} Streaming-only figures based on certification alone.

== Release history ==
Release dates for "Suit & Tie"
Region	Date	Format	Version	Label	Ref.
Italy	January 14, 2013	Contemporary hit radio	Radio edit	Sony	
Various	January 14, 2013	Digital download	Album version	RCA	
Various	January 31, 2013	Digital download	Radio edit	RCA	

== See also ==
- List of number-one hits of 2013 (Denmark)
