= The 20/20 Experience =

2013 studio album by Justin Timberlake

- Standard edition cover

Studio album by Justin Timberlake
- Released: March 15, 2013
- Recorded: May–July 2012
- Studios: Larrabee (North Hollywood); EastWest (Los Angeles)
- Genres: R&B; neo soul
- Length: 70:05
- Label: RCA
- Producers: Jerome "J-Roc" Harmon; Justin Timberlake; Rob Knox; The Tennessee Kids; Timbaland

Justin Timberlake chronology
FutureSex/LoveSounds (2006)	The 20/20 Experience (2013)	The 20/20 Experience – 2 of 2 (2013)

Alternative cover
- Deluxe edition cover

Singles from The 20/20 Experience
- 1. "Suit & Tie" Released: January 14, 2013; 2. "Mirrors" Released: February 11, 2013; 3. "Tunnel Vision" Released: June 14, 2013

The 20/20 Experience is the third studio album by American singer Justin Timberlake. It was released on March 15, 2013, through RCA Records, as the follow-up to his second studio album, FutureSex/LoveSounds (2006). An R&B and neo soul album with elements of soul music, its lyrics discuss romance and sex. Production was handled by Timbaland, Timberlake—who was also the executive producer—and Jerome "J-Roc" Harmon, with Rob Knox contributing to the album's deluxe edition. The 20/20 Experience is considered to be the first half of a project, and in September 2013, it was supplemented by Timberlake's fourth studio album, The 20/20 Experience – 2 of 2.

The 20/20 Experience received generally positive reviews from music critics, and was included on multiple year-end rankings of the best albums for 2013. It charted at number one in Australia, Canada, Germany, Ireland, New Zealand, Scotland, Switzerland, Taiwan, the United Kingdom, and the United States. The album was certified 2× platinum in Canada, Poland, Brazil, New Zealand, and the United States, platinum in Australia, Denmark, and the United Kingdom, and gold in Germany, Ireland, Mexico, the Netherlands, Norway, Sweden, and Switzerland.

Three songs from The 20/20 Experience were released as singles. Its lead single, "Suit & Tie", peaked in the top five in several countries and reached number three in the US. The album's second single, "Mirrors", reached number one in the UK and number two in the US. Its third and final single, "Tunnel Vision", reached number sixty-one in the UK and number eleven on the Bubbling Under Hot 100 chart. Timberlake embarked on the Legends of the Summer Stadium Tour with Jay-Z and The 20/20 Experience World Tour. The album was later included as part of the compilation The 20/20 Experience – The Complete Experience, which was nominated for a Grammy Award for Best Pop Vocal Album. Additionally, "Suit & Tie" and "Pusher Love Girl" won Grammy Awards for Best Music Video and Best R&B Song, respectively.

== Background ==
In September 2006, Timberlake released his second studio album, FutureSex/LoveSounds, which was a commercial success and received generally positive reviews from music critics. The album spawned six singles, including the US number-one singles "SexyBack", "My Love", and "What Goes Around... Comes Around". After ending the FutureSex/LoveShow concert tour to support the album in 2007, Timberlake took a break from his music career to focus on acting, with occasional guest appearances on singles by Madonna, T.I., Jamie Foxx, Timbaland, and Esmée Denters.

== Development and title ==
In 2010, Timberlake's music manager, Johnny Wright, approached him to discuss the possibility of Timberlake returning to his music career and the difficulties of releasing his future material, because according to Wright: "a lot of the physical record sellers were gone, by the time they've got music again they needed to think about different ways to deliver it". Wright proposed a promotion based on a software application or releasing a new song each month. Timberlake, however, was not interested in returning to music and he continued to focus on his film career. In late May or early June of 2012, Timberlake invited Wright to dinner and said he had spent the previous two nights in a studio with Timbaland working on new material. Wright was shocked by the announcement, and the two began planning to promote and release the album. They agreed on a gap of seven or eight weeks between the singles and the album. Wright told Billboard "such a short window" demanded "a big impact".

In August 2012, producer Jim Beanz reported Timberlake had started work on his new music project. Shortly after the announcement, Timberlake's publicist denied plans for a new album, stating Timberlake was working on Timbaland's upcoming project, Shock Value III. Wright stated although Timbaland's project involved artists who were Timberlake's friends, keeping it a secret was difficult, so they used codenames. Timberlake's project was originally planned for release in October 2012, but it was postponed because of his wedding to actress Jessica Biel. During an interview with American radio and television host Ryan Seacrest, Timberlake explained the meaning of the album's title, saying: "It more or less came out of: I was playing some of the stuff for my friends and they would come in and out of the studio and I'd say, 'What do you think of this?' And my best friend said, 'This is music that you can see,' and for some reason that stuck with me".

== Recording ==
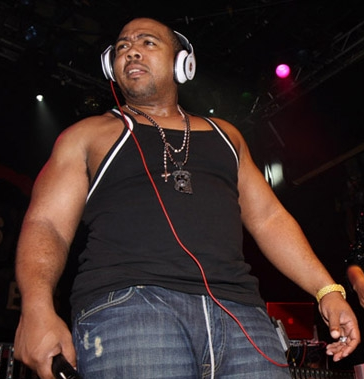
Timbaland provided the bulk of the production on the album.

The 20/20 Experience was produced over 20 days. Recording sessions for The 20/20 Experience began in late May or early June 2012, and concluded in July that year. The album was recorded at Larrabee Studios in North Hollywood, EastWest Studios in Los Angeles, and Jungle City Studios in New York City. Of Timbaland's participation, Wright said: "[Their] relationship is like a brotherhood; they're just so comfortable with each other – not only as musical friends but as personal friends ... that you can get things done in a short period of time. Had [the Ben Affleck movie Runner Runner] not happened, we might have actually set up and put the album out sooner". After the recording was finished, Timberlake and Wright, with M2M Construction, began "formulating plans for how to release the music". Timberlake, then most of the band, used JH Audio in-ear monitoring systems.

== Composition ==
According to Timberlake, The 20/20 Experience "goes a lot of different directions. I think there's probably a little bit of what was reminiscent on the first album and then a little bit of what's reminiscent of the second album, and then some new stuff." While working on the album, Timberlake thought: "If Pink Floyd and Led Zeppelin can do 10-minute songs and Queen can do 10-minute songs then why can't we? We'll figure out the radio edits later."

The 20/20 Experience is a neo soul album that was partly inspired by the expansive song structures of 1960s and 1970s rock. The songs average seven minutes in length, and are characterized by vamps, abrupt key changes, and unexpected rhythms and harmonies. Music journalist Jody Rosen noted an emphasis on "rhythm and flow" rather than catchiness, and said it is "not quite a pop album" because its "sense of musical space-time is more elastic and sprawling than anything on the radio". The album's music incorporates samples of piano, distorted voices, and buzzing electronic sounds with elements of soul music, including resonant voiceovers, lush string and horn arrangements, high-pitched guitar solos, and squelching analog synthesizers. Steven Hyden said the album has "traditionalist tendencies", and Simon Price wrote that producers Timbaland and J-Roc merged 1970s influences with futuristic sounds: "the Chi-Lites in orbit, the Isley Brothers gone intergalactic, and so on". Price also compared the production on the album to Quincy Jones's production on Michael Jackson's 1979 album Off the Wall.

The album's lyrics deal mostly with romance. The songs use different metaphors for sex, including drugs on "Pusher Love Girl", candy on "Strawberry Bubblegum", and outer space on "Spaceship Coupe". Music critic Ken Tucker wrote that each song portrays Timberlake as a "starry-eyed romantic, bedazzled by a woman upon whom he cannot heap enough compliments, come-ons and seductive playfulness".

== Singles ==
"Suit & Tie", featuring rapper Jay-Z, was released as The 20/20 Experience's lead single on January 14, 2013. It is a mid-tempo, R&B, and soul song that, according to Melinda Newman of HitFix, "floats along" like a song from the American band The Whispers. The music video for "Suit & Tie" was filmed on January 25, 2013, and released on February 14 the same year. It was directed by David Fincher, who directed The Social Network (2010), in which Timberlake starred. "Suit & Tie" was a commercial success, reaching the top ten in 15 countries. It reached number three on both the UK singles chart and the US Billboard Hot 100.

"Mirrors" was released as the album's second single on February 11, 2013, following Timberlake's performance at the 2013 Grammy Awards. The single topped the UK singles chart and reached the top five in Denmark, Ireland, Germany, South Korea, and Switzerland. It peaked at number two on the US Billboard Hot 100. "Tunnel Vision" was released as the third and final single from the album on June 14, 2013. The music video was released on July 3, 2013. It reached number sixty-one on the UK singles chart and number eleven on the Bubbling Under Hot 100 chart.

== Promotion ==
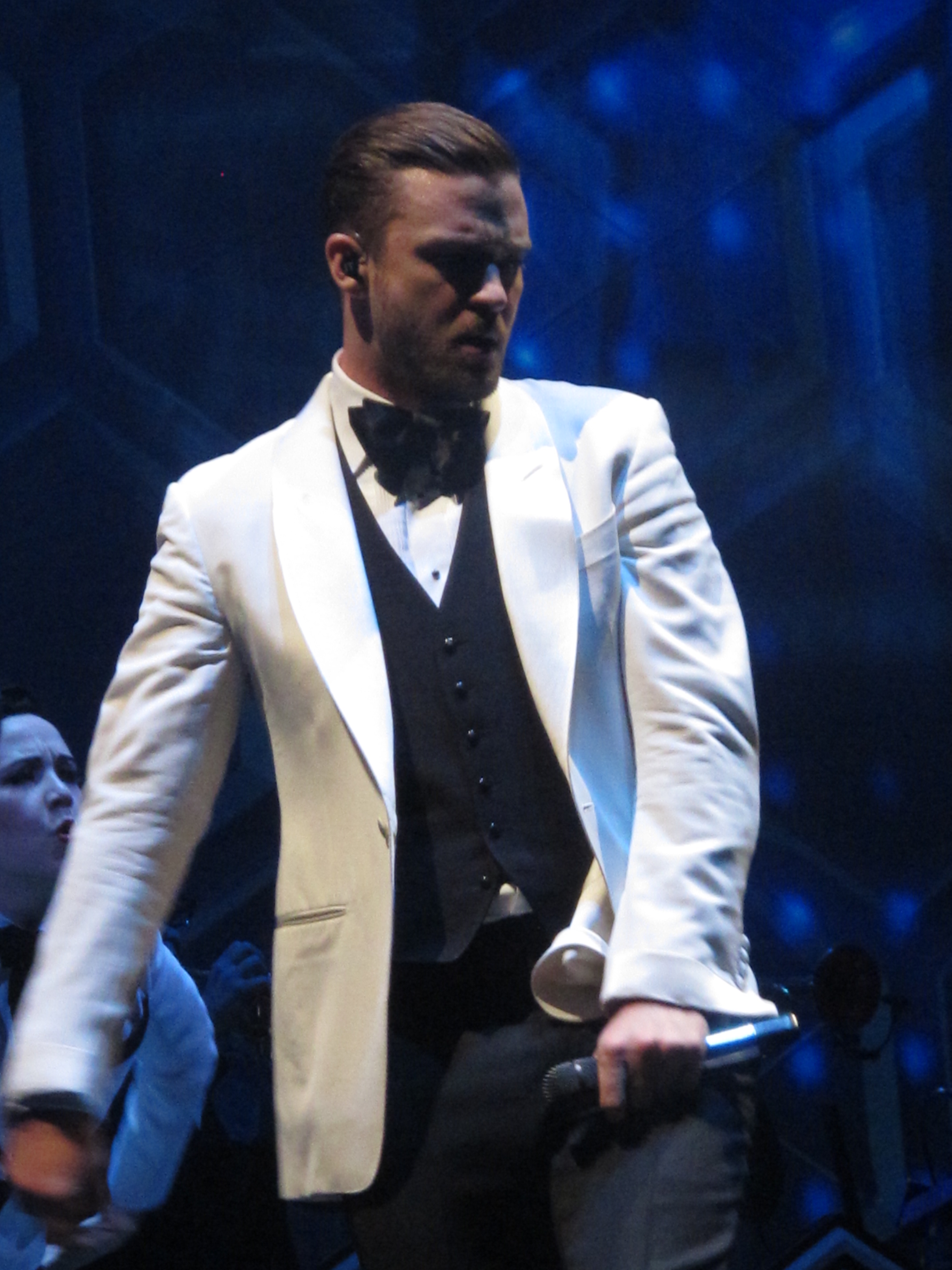
Timberlake performing during The 20/20 Experience World Tour, February 2014

In September 2012, Timberlake and Wright met with RCA Records heads Peter Edge and Tom Corson to "plot release strategies for the album". In November that year, Wright and RCA Records began discussions with Target and other corporations to plan marketing for the album. Timberlake, part-owner of the social media site Myspace, put "Suit & Tie" on the splash page with a chance to stream or download the song in return for joining the site or signing in during its relaunch in January 2013. Timberlake and Jay-Z performed "Suit & Tie" at the 55th Annual Grammy Awards on February 10, 2013. They performed the song again during Timberlake's hosting of Saturday Night Live on March 9, 2013. Timberlake debuted the live performance of the second single, "Mirrors", at the Brit Awards 2013 ceremony at The O2 Arena, London, on February 20, 2013. He sang two songs from the album, "Pusher Love Girl" and "That Girl", during the Super Bowl XLVII weekend.

Timberlake performed a preview concert at Roseland Ballroom on May 5, 2013. He held a one-off concert in Dublin, Ireland at Phoenix Park on July 10, 2013. On February 22, 2013, it was announced Timberlake and Jay-Z would embark on the Legends of the Summer Stadium Tour, a co-headlining series of concerts. He headlined the 2013 Yahoo Wireless Festival at Queen Elizabeth Olympic Park, London, for two of the festival's three nights; July 12, where he headlined alone and July 14, where he headlined with Jay-Z. It served as a preview for the Legends of the Summer Tour, which began on July 17 in Toronto, Ontario.

To further promote the album, Timberlake announced on May 5, 2013, that he would embark on The 20/20 Experience World Tour, his second global concert tour that was promoted primarily by AEG Live. The tour debuted on October 31, 2013, in Montreal, two months after the Legends of the Summer Tour concluded. Twenty-two additional North American dates were announced, ending on February 10, 2014, in Omaha, Nebraska. Several dates were made available for pre-sale for members of The Tennessee Kids, Timberlake's official fan club. According to Timberlake's official website, additional unannounced dates in Europe, South America, and Australia would follow. Timberlake headlined the iTunes Festival in September 2013.

== Critical reception ==
Professional ratings
Aggregate scores
Source	Rating
AnyDecentMusic?	7.1/10
Metacritic	75/100
Review scores
Source	Rating
AllMusic	2.5/5 stars
The A.V. Club	B
The Daily Telegraph	4/5 stars
The Guardian	3/5 stars
The Independent	4/5 stars
NME	6/10
The Observer	4/5 stars
Pitchfork	8.4/10
Rolling Stone	4/5 stars
Spin	8/10

The 20/20 Experience received generally positive reviews from critics. At Metacritic, which assigns a normalized rating out of 100 to reviews from mainstream publications, the album received an average score of 75, based on 39 reviews. Sputnikmusic's Sobhi Youssef called it "expertly" written and produced, and called it a "profound manifestation" of recent innovations in R&B. Mikael Wood of the Los Angeles Times found its elaborate structures ambitious in the tradition of Stevie Wonder, Prince, and Michael Jackson. Andy Gill of The Independent called it "diversely enjoyable" and viewed Timbaland's production as solid, albeit not innovative. Jody Rosen, writing for Rolling Stone, said although The 20/20 Experience lacks songs as immediate as Timberlake's previous hits, the album's multidimensional music eventually "sinks its teeth in, even on the wooziest songs". Jordan Sargent of Spin called it a "sonic wonder" and said the songs are ingenious enough to justify their lengths.

Pitchfork's Ryan Dombal commended Timberlake for "shamelessly extol[ing] the joys of music and marriage", and viewed The 20/20 Experience as more ambitious than his 2002 debut album Justified and more consistent than FutureSex/LoveSounds. Kitty Empire, writing for The Observer, found it mostly "terrific – lush and quirky too", with silly, respectable homages to Prince. Helen Brown of The Daily Telegraph said that the music feels both grandiose and intimate, and that Timberlake makes up for his thin voice with "yearning charisma and sly timing to sell every swoon." Genevieve Koski of The A.V. Club called the album "an exercise in sophisticated sexiness" and complimented Timberlake's "preternatural assuredness", saying his "skilled" performance rectifies the calculated production.

Some reviewers criticized the album's lyrics. Alexis Petridis of The Guardian said the album's adventurous music is marred by Timberlake's lyrics, which he called "porny" and "awful". George Morahan of State called them banal and dismissed most of the music as "a protracted exploration of rhythm" on which Timberlake and Timbaland are too keen. Slant Magazine's Eric Henderson wrote that they overembellished "rehashed" musical ideas, "turning each B+ potential single into a C− epic." AllMusic's Andy Kellman called the album "a pleasant and grown but tedious release from a charismatic entertainer and exceptional vocal arranger who is not a great recording artist"; Kellman also said: "few songs are dynamic enough to justify their length" on a refined, but bloated album. Jon Caramanica of The New York Times panned it as an "amiable, anodyne album" with little variation and seven-minute songs that masquerade as "artistry". According to Siân Rowe of NME, Frank Ocean and Miguel are "doing better R&B jams in under four minutes".

=== Accolades ===
The 20/20 Experience was ranked at number 11 on Billboard's "15 Best Albums of 2013: Critics' Picks" list. Sputnikmusic staff ranked the album at number two on their year-end list. Drowned in Sound featured the album at number 17 on its list of the year's favorite albums. For its list "The 20 Best Albums of the 2010s (So Far)", which it published in January 2015, Billboard listed the album at number 14, commenting: "Timberlake came back as a lovesick adult, bouncing old-school soul ideas off of his best bud Timbaland and writing a modern-day symphony for his beloved, Jessica Biel, that stretched for over an hour. We all grow up, but few do so as stylishly as JT."

== Awards ==
The album, as part of the compilation The 20/20 Experience – The Complete Experience, was nominated for Best Pop Vocal Album at the 56th Annual Grammy Awards. Additionally, "Mirrors" was nominated for Best Pop Solo Performance, "Suit & Tie" for Best Pop Duo/Group Performance and Best Music Video, and "Pusher Love Girl" for Best R&B Song, winning the latter two. The 20/20 Experience won Favorite Soul/R&B Album at the American Music Awards of 2013, Top Billboard 200 Album and Top R&B Album at the 2014 Billboard Music Awards, and Favorite Album at the 40th People's Choice Awards. Timberlake won four awards at the 2013 MTV Video Music Awards, including Video of the Year for "Mirrors" and Best Direction for "Suit & Tie".

The 20/20 Experience also received nominations for Favorite Pop/Rock Album at the American Music Awards, Album of the Year at the 2013 Soul Train Music Awards, and Outstanding Album at the 2014 NAACP Image Awards.

== Commercial performance ==
In North America, The 20/20 Experience became Timberlake's second number-one album as a solo artist on the US Billboard 200, receiving a double platinum certification from the Recording Industry Association of America (RIAA). It reached number one on the Canadian Albums chart and became his second number-one album. The 20/20 Experience was certified 2× platinum in Canada by Music Canada. It peaked at number eleven in Mexico and was certified gold by Asociación Mexicana de Productores de Fonogramas y Videogramas (AMPROFON). In South America, the album peaked at number four in Argentina and was certified 2× platinum in Brazil by Pro-Música Brasil (PMB).

In Europe, The 20/20 Experience charted at number one in Germany, Ireland, Scotland, Switzerland, and the United Kingdom, number two in Austria, Denmark, the Netherlands, and Norway, number three in Flanders, number four in Hungary, number five in Poland, number six in the Czech Republic, France, and Italy, number eight in Wallonia, number nine in Portugal and Spain, number ten in Finland and Greece, number twelve in Sweden, and number twenty in Croatia. The album was certified 2× platinum in Poland, platinum in Denmark and the United Kingdom, and gold in Germany, Ireland, the Netherlands, Norway, Sweden, and Switzerland.

In Oceania, The 20/20 Experience charted at number one in Australia and received a platinum certification from the Australian Recording Industry Association (ARIA). It peaked at number one in New Zealand and was certified 2× platinum by Recorded Music NZ (RMNZ). In Asia, the album peaked at number one in Taiwan, number six in South Korea, and number eleven in Japan. In Africa, it peaked at number twelve in South Africa.

== Track listing ==
All standard edition tracks are written by Justin Timberlake, Timothy Mosley, Jerome Harmon and James Fauntleroy, except where noted and produced by Timbaland, Timberlake and Jerome "J-Roc" Harmon. All deluxe edition tracks are written by Timberlake, Robin Tadross, and Fauntleroy and produced by Rob Knox and Timberlake. All vocals produced and arranged by Timberlake, except "That Girl".

Standard edition
No.	Title	Length
1.	"Pusher Love Girl"	8:02
2.	"Suit & Tie" (featuring Jay-Z) (additional writers: Shawn Carter, Terrence Stubbs, Johnny Wilson and Charles Still)	5:26
3.	"Don't Hold the Wall"	7:10
4.	"Strawberry Bubblegum"	7:59
5.	"Tunnel Vision"	6:46
6.	"Spaceship Coupe"	7:17
7.	"That Girl" (additional writer: Noel Williams)	4:47
8.	"Let the Groove Get In"	7:11
9.	"Mirrors"	8:05
10.	"Blue Ocean Floor"	7:22
Total length:		1:10:05

Deluxe edition
No.	Title	Length
11.	"Dress On"	4:39
12.	"Body Count"	4:42
Total length:		1:19:26

=== Sample credits ===
- "Suit & Tie" contains a portion of the composition "Sho' Nuff", written by Stubbs, Wilson and Still.
- "Dont Hold the Wall" contains a sample of "Steel Dream" by Cirque Du Soleil and dialogue from the 1955 film A Word to the Wives...
- "That Girl" contains a sample of "Self Destruct", written by Williams, as performed by King Sporty.
- "Let the Groove Get In" contains a sample from the recording "Alhamdulillahi", from the album Explorer Series: Africa-Burkina Faso – Rhythms of the Grasslands.

== Credits and personnel ==
Credits are adapted from the album's liner notes.

- Justin Timberlake – executive producer, vocals (all tracks), producer (all tracks), vocal production and arrangements (all tracks), mixing (all tracks), guitar (tracks 9, 12), keyboards (track 11)
- Alejandro Baima – assistant mixing (tracks 1, 3–10)
- Steve Bone – assistant mixing (tracks 11, 12)
- Marc Cargill – violin solo (track 10)
- Jimmy Douglass – mixing (all tracks)
- Reggie Dozier – strings and horns engineer (track 1)
- Paul Foley – engineer (tracks 11, 12)
- Chris Godbey – engineer (tracks 1–10), mixing (all tracks)
- Jerome "J-Roc" Harmon – producer (tracks 1–10), keyboards (tracks 1–11)
- Elliott Ives – guitars (all tracks)
- Jay-Z – rap (track 2)
- Rob Knox – producer (tracks 11, 12)
- The Regiment – horns (tracks 1, 7, 8, 12)
- The Tennessee Kids – vocal production and arrangements (track 7)
- Terry Santiel – percussion (tracks 8, 12)
- Timbaland – producer (tracks 1–10), additional vocals (tracks 2–5, 7, 11, 12)
- Matt Weber – assistant mixing (track 2)
- Benjamin Wright and his Orchestra – strings (tracks 1, 6, 9–11), horns (tracks 6, 8)
- Dave Kutch – mastering
- Tom Munro – photography
- Doug Lloyd – creative direction
- Jason Evans – creative direction
- Michael Nash – stylist
- Tom Ford – wardrobe

== Charts ==
=== Weekly charts ===
Weekly chart performance for The 20/20 Experience
Chart (2013)	Peak position
Argentine Albums (CAPIF)	4
Australian Albums (ARIA)	1
Australian Urban Albums (ARIA)	1
Austrian Albums (Ö3 Austria)	2
Belgian Albums (Ultratop Flanders)	3
Belgian Albums (Ultratop Wallonia)	8
Canadian Albums (Billboard)	1
Croatian Albums (Toplista)	20
Czech Albums (IFPI)	6
Danish Albums (Hitlisten)	2
Dutch Albums (Album Top 100)	2
Finnish Albums (Suomen virallinen lista)	10
French Albums (SNEP)	6
German Albums (Offizielle Top 100)	1
Greek Albums (IFPI Greece)	10
Hungarian Albums (MAHASZ)	4
Irish Albums (IRMA)	1
Italian Albums (FIMI)	6
Japanese Albums (Oricon)	11
Mexican Albums (Top 100 Mexico)	11
New Zealand Albums (RMNZ)	1
Norwegian Albums (VG-lista)	2
Polish Albums (ZPAV)	5
Portuguese Albums (AFP)	9
Scottish Albums (Official Charts)	1
South African Albums (RISA)	12
South Korean Albums (Gaon Chart)	6
Spanish Albums (Promusicae)	9
Swedish Albums (Sverigetopplistan)	12
Swiss Albums (Schweizer Hitparade)	1
Taiwanese Albums (G-Music)	1
UK Albums (Official Charts)	1
UK R&B Albums (Official Charts)	1
US Billboard 200	1
US Top R&B/Hip-Hop Albums (Billboard)	1

=== Year-end charts ===
2013 year-end chart performance for The 20/20 Experience
Chart (2013)	Position
Australian Albums (ARIA)	36
Belgian Albums (Ultratop Flanders)	32
Belgian Albums (Ultratop Wallonia)	98
Canadian Albums (Billboard)	11
Danish Albums (Hitlisten)	25
Dutch Albums (Album Top 100)	26
German Albums (Offizielle Top 100)	29
Hungarian Albums (MAHASZ)	87
Italian Albums (FIMI)	78
New Zealand Albums (RMNZ)	39
Swedish Albums (Sverigetopplistan)	98
Swiss Albums (Schweizer Hitparade)	16
UK Albums (OCC)	21
US Billboard 200	1
US Top R&B/Hip-Hop Albums (Billboard)	1

2014 year-end chart performance for The 20/20 Experience
Chart (2014)	Position
US Billboard 200	142
US Top R&B/Hip-Hop Albums (Billboard)	24

=== Decade-end charts ===
Decade-end chart performance for The 20/20 Experience
Chart (2010–2019)	Position
US Billboard 200	41

=== All-time charts ===
All-time chart performance for The 20/20 Experience
Chart	Position
US Billboard 200	200

== Certifications ==
Certifications and sales for The 20/20 Experience
Region	Certification	Certified units/sales
Australia (ARIA)	Platinum	70,000^{^}
Brazil (Pro-Música Brasil)	2× Platinum	80,000^{‡}
Canada (Music Canada)	2× Platinum	160,000^{^}
Denmark (IFPI Danmark)	Platinum	20,000^{‡}
Germany (BVMI)	Gold	100,000^{^}
Ireland (IRMA)	Gold	7,500^{^}
Mexico (AMPROFON)	Gold	30,000^{‡}
Netherlands (NVPI)	Gold	25,000^{^}
New Zealand (RMNZ)	2× Platinum	30,000^{‡}
Norway (IFPI Norway)	Gold	15,000^{‡}
Poland (ZPAV)	2× Platinum	40,000^{‡}
Sweden (GLF)	Gold	20,000^{‡}
Switzerland (IFPI Switzerland)	Gold	10,000^{^}
United Kingdom (BPI)	Platinum	369,000
United States (RIAA)	2× Platinum	2,579,000
^{^} Shipments figures based on certification alone.^{‡} Sales+streaming figures based on certification alone.

== Release history ==
Release dates for The 20/20 Experience
Region	Date	Edition(s)	Label	Ref.
Germany	March 15, 2013	Standard (CD, LP); deluxe (CD)	Sony	
France	March 18, 2013	Deluxe (CD)	Sony	
United Kingdom	March 18, 2013	Standard (CD, LP); deluxe (CD)	RCA	
Canada	March 19, 2013	Deluxe (CD)	Sony	
United States	March 19, 2013	Standard; deluxe (CD, LP)	RCA	
Japan	March 20, 2013	Standard (CD)	Sony Japan	
Canada	April 16, 2013	Standard (LP)	Sony	

== See also ==
- List of UK Albums Chart number ones of the 2010s
- List of Billboard 200 number-one albums of 2013
