= Mirrors (Justin Timberlake song) =

2013 single by Justin Timberlake

Single by Justin Timberlake

from the album The 20/20 Experience
- B-side: "Suit & Tie"
- Released: February 11, 2013
- Studio: Larrabee (North Hollywood)
- Genre: Pop; progressive pop; R&B
- Length: 8:05 (album version); 4:37 (radio edit)
- Label: RCA
- Songwriters: Justin Timberlake; Timothy "Timbaland" Mosley; Jerome "J-Roc" Harmon; James Fauntleroy
- Producers: Timbaland; Justin Timberlake; Jerome "J-Roc" Harmon

Justin Timberlake singles chronology
"Suit & Tie" (2013)	"Mirrors" (2013)	"Tunnel Vision" (2013)

Music video
- "Mirrors" on YouTube

"Mirrors" is a song by American singer Justin Timberlake from his third studio album, The 20/20 Experience (2013). Timberlake co-wrote and co-produced the track with Timbaland and J-Roc, with James Fauntleroy providing additional songwriting. RCA Records released it as the album's second single on February 11, 2013. First conceived in 2009, "Mirrors" is an eight-minute-long mid-tempo pop, progressive pop, and R&B ballad that was inspired by his relationship with Jessica Biel and his grandparents' marriage. In its lyrics, Timberlake sings to a lover about "coming to the realization" that she is his "other half".

Upon being released, "Mirrors" received positive reviews from music critics and topped the Australian Urban, Bulgarian, European, Lebanese, Polish, South African, and United Kingdom singles charts, becoming Timberlake's fourth number-one single in the UK. The song peaked at number two on the Billboard Hot 100 and topped the Mainstream Top 40 in the United States. "Mirrors" was ranked at number six on the Year-End Hot 100 chart. The song received a nomination for Best Pop Solo Performance at the 56th Annual Grammy Awards. By 2018, the song had sold over 3.9 million downloads in the US.

Floria Sigismondi directed the music video for "Mirrors", which was released in March 2013 and depicts the story of two lovers over several decades. It won two MTV Video Music Awards, including Video of the Year. Timberlake performed "Mirrors" on television shows, including Saturday Night Live and the 2013 MTV Video Music Awards, as part of a medley. It was included on the Legends of the Summer Stadium Tour (2013), The 20/20 Experience World Tour (2013–2015), The Man of the Woods Tour (2018–2019), and The Forget Tomorrow World Tour (2024–2025) set lists. The American Society of Composers, Authors and Publishers (ASCAP) recognized it as one of the most performed songs of 2014 and 2015.

== Background ==
In September 2006, Timberlake released his second album, FutureSex/LoveSounds, which was a commercial success and received generally positive reviews from music critics. The album spawned six singles, including the US number-one singles "SexyBack", "My Love", and "What Goes Around... Comes Around". After wrapping up a worldwide concert tour to support the album in 2007, Timberlake took a break from his music career to focus on acting, with occasional guest appearances on several singles by Madonna, T.I., Jamie Foxx, Timbaland, and Esmée Denters.

Timberlake's music manager Johnny Wright approached him in 2010, discussing possibility of going back to his music career and the difficulties of releasing his future material, because according to Wright, "a lot of the physical record sellers were gone, by the time they've got music again they needed to think about different ways to deliver it". Wright proposed a promotion based on an application or releasing a new song every month. Timberlake, however, was not interested in returning to music; instead, he continued to focus on his film career. Around the "late part of May, first week in June" 2012, Timberlake invited Wright to dinner and revealed that he had spent the last couple of nights in the studio with Timbaland working on new material. Wright was shocked by the revelation, and the two immediately began planning how to promote and release the album. Ultimately, they agreed on a shorter period, seven or eight weeks, between the singles and the album. Wright told Billboard that "such a short window" demanded "a big impact".

In August 2012, producer Jim Beanz reported that Timberlake had started work on his new music project. Shortly after the announcement, Timberlake's publicist denied plans for a new album, stating that Timberlake was instead working on Timbaland's upcoming project, Shock Value III. Wright stated that although the project involved artists who are primarily Timberlake's friends, it was tough to keep it a secret, so they used codenames. Originally planned for release in October 2012, Timberlake's project was postponed because of his wedding to actress Jessica Biel.

== Writing and inspiration ==
During an interview with Billboard, Jerome "J-Roc" Harmon recalled that the song was conceived in 2009 during the recording sessions for Timbaland's third studio album, Shock Value II (2009). Timberlake decided to save the song for his own album, and the timing of its release was uncertain at the time. Harmon noted that they could have waited many years before Timberlake released it. Eventually, Timberlake brought "Mirrors" to the project when he was ready. Although the final version of "Mirrors" is eight minutes long, the R&B-oriented second half was created years later and independently of the original track. Harmon explained that the two parts were connected to flow like a single song, but the second half could function as a separate track. Once Timberlake finalized the songs for the album, the second half of "Mirrors" was incorporated into the album's overall structure.

In his autobiography Hindsight (2018), Timberlake described writing the song for his then-future wife, Jessica Biel. At the time, they were living together but not yet engaged. The music video for the song became a dedication to his grandparents, from whom he learned about "long-lasting love". Timberlake stated that the song reflects the impact Biel had on his life rather than specific details of their relationship.

== Composition ==
"Mirrors" (2013)
A 29-second sample of "Mirrors". It features emo power ballad guitar strobes, hand-claps, orchestral flares, electro blips, chipmunk synth chirps accompanied by "vocoder-squawk backing vocals".

"Mirrors" is a mid-tempo pop, progressive pop, and R&B ballad with an approximate length of eight minutes and five seconds. Sheet music for the song is in the key of E♭ major, set in common time with a tempo of 72 beats per minute. Timberlake's vocals span from the low note of E♭_{3} to the high note of C_{5}. The original mix has an instrumentation of emo power ballad guitar strobes, hand-claps, orchestral flares, electro blips and chipmunk synth chirps accompanied with "vocoder-squawk backing vocals"; and the orchestra has a noticeable much-lower volume than the percussion and electric guitars.

Brad Stern of MTV Buzzworthy wrote that it is hugely catchy and contains melodies that have arena-sized appeal. Paste's Lauren Martin described it as "Coldplay-does-R&B", while according to Raible, "Mirrors" is a sad answer to Natalie Imbruglia's 1997 single "Torn". Mikael Wood of the Los Angeles Times described it as a cross between Timberlake's 2002 single "Cry Me a River" and "November Rain" by Guns N' Roses. HitFix's Melinda Newman wrote that the melody features layer upon layer of the singer's vocals stacked upon each other. Jon Dolan of Rolling Stone described Timberlake's singing on the song as "replete with laidback soulfulness, mountain-climbing croon, and falsetto butter." Jason Lipshutz of Billboard stated that aside from the presence of Timbaland's "fantastically cluttered production", the difference between "Mirrors" and "Cry Me a River" is clear: "10 years ago, Timberlake was broken, and now he is whole."

"Mirrors" is a "new-age wedding reception song". Lyrically, in the song, Timberlake sings to a lover about "coming to the realization" that she is his "other half". The singer references "taking a break from the relationship": "It was easy coming back here to you/ Once I figured it out, you were right here all along", he sings in the chorus. "It's like you're my mirror, my mirror staring back at me/ I couldn't get any bigger/ With anyone else beside of me". Vibe's Charley Rogulewski wrote that the strength of the song is in Timberlake's Neo blue-eyed soul delivery of the "catchy" lyrics, "I don't want to lose you now. I'm looking right at the other half of me". In the full-length version, Timberlake sings the phrase "you are the love of my life" over 35 times.

== Critical reception ==
The song received positive reviews from music critics. Jenna Hally Rubenstein of MTV Buzzworthy observed that, unlike the sultry and retro style of "Suit & Tie", the track is reminiscent of Timberlake's sound from FutureSex/LoveSounds (2006), featuring layered synths and club-ready pop production by Timbaland. Robert Copsey of Digital Spy commented that despite musical changes over the preceding eleven years, the single sounds fresh, pairing reflective lyrics with a head-nodding Timbaland beat and grandiose strings. Emily Exton of VH1 described the song as grand and ambitious, highlighting its unusual character study and rhythm changes after the five-minute mark.

Marc Hogan of Spin offered a mixed perspective, criticizing the track's pickup-line lyrics and suggesting that some of Timbaland's beatbox-style production, though previously successful on FutureSex/LoveSounds, felt overused. Charley Rogulewski of Vibe wrote that Timberlake presents the song more as a pop performer than as an R&B artist, creating distance between himself and contemporaries such as Robin Thicke and signaling a serious comeback. Andy Kellman of AllMusic provided a less favorable assessment, describing the track as a drawn-out mid-tempo pop ballad and one of Timberlake's less remarkable singles. In a monthly mix review published in Sound on Sound, Mike Senior was not positive towards the track, feeling that the live strings used in the track were wasted, and sounded too low volume compared to the other instruments.

At the end of the year, Rolling Stone ranked "Mirrors" as the seventh best song of 2013, while Billboard editors placed it at number ten.

== Release and commercial performance ==
On February 11, 2013, "Mirrors" was digitally released worldwide as the second single from The 20/20 Experience. Timberlake had announced the release on his Twitter account the previous day. It was available to buy as either a stand-alone track or as an "instant-gratification download" when a customer pre-ordered the album. On March 1, it was released in Germany as a CD single, which also contained The 20/20 Experience's lead single, "Suit & Tie". A radio edit of the single, was released on March 13 for digital download in France, Spain, and the United States. On April 16, it was serviced to contemporary hit and rhythmic radio stations in the United States. Additionally, "Mirrors" was sent to adult contemporary radio on April 22 and to urban contemporary radio on May 14.

"Mirrors" peaked at number two on the US Billboard Hot 100; it received a 2× platinum certification from the Recording Industry Association of America (RIAA) and sold 3,900,000 copies. It became Timberlake's fourth number-one single on the UK Singles Chart, receiving a triple platinum certification from the British Phonographic Industry (BPI). It reached number four on the Canadian Hot 100 and became Timberlake's sixth top-five single. "Mirrors" was certified 3× platinum in Canada by Music Canada. In Australia, the song peaked at number ten and received a 3× platinum certification from the Australian Recording Industry Association (ARIA). It peaked at number seven in New Zealand and was certified 5× platinum.

Elsewhere, "Mirrors" peaked at number one on the Adult Pop Airplay, Australia Urban, Bulgaria, Canada AC, Canada Hot AC, Canada CHR/Top 40, Europe, Israel, Lebanon, Poland, Pop Airplay, Rhythmic Airplay, Scotland, UK Airplay, and UK Hip Hop/R&B single charts. It peaked at number two in Germany, Hungary, and South Africa. In addition, it reached number 160 on the Billboard Global 200 of November 28, 2020. "Mirrors" received a 3× diamond certification in Brazil, 3× platinum in Denmark for streaming, 2× platinum in Italy and Sweden, platinum in Germany, Mexico, Portugal, Spain, Switzerland, and gold in Austria and Denmark. Additionally, it sold 109,941 copies in South Korea.

== Music video ==
Timberlake catching his grandparents' wedding ring, before embarking on a "lengthy, and quite wrought" dance sequence. An MTV News writer thought the scene was a reference to the time his grandfather's failing health prevented him from attending Timberlake's wedding.

The music video was directed by Floria Sigismondi and saw its world premiere as the highlight of an hour-long special on The CW in celebration of The 20/20 Experience's release. Timberlake dedicated the music video to his maternal grandparents William and Sadie Bomar, who were married for 63 years until William died in 2012.

It features montages of three separate time periods of a couple's life, from their initial introduction and whimsically falling in love on a funhouse date (portrayed by actors Ariane Rinehart and Keenan Cochrane), to the difficult start of their marriage with a pregnancy (portrayed by Chloe Brooks and James Kacey), to when they have grown old together and the old lady (Judith Roberts) packing up her recently deceased husband's belongings whilst reflecting on their life together.

At the beginning, the elderly woman looks back on her teen years in the 1950s when she meets her husband in a bar and goes on a date to a funhouse. Then, in the 1960s, she cries with black mascara all over her face as she is pregnant and they are unmarried. Meanwhile, the elderly woman, who sees the events of her teen years interspersed with scenes of her and her husband dancing for the last time before they move out, walks into a mysterious room where an old man is seen staring at the real-life woman in her white wedding dress next to two mannequins while rain pours down on the glass, likely symbolizing that he always viewed his wife as beautiful as the day they married. She moves through the video while the old man and the elderly woman walk separate ways through the video and through the mirrors, symbolizing his death and her moving on.

During the final chorus, one of the books the teenage couple left on the floor of the funhouse falls back into the elderly woman's hand, and she closes the book. The old woman is then seen with a ring, which is revealed in flashbacks to be her wedding ring, after she married her husband after the pregnancy. Her husband looks on, and they move through separate areas before the end of the video, where the old man and woman walk through three versions of mirrors. The elderly woman drops the ring, showing she is ready to move on after her husband's death. This transitions into Timberlake catching it, symbolizing that he is carrying on their legacy. He then sings "you are the love of my life" while dancing through and around the funhouse mirrors. Eventually, he is joined by two female dancers in blue wigs. Justin and one of the other dancers eventually mirror each other's movements through glass at the end of the video.

=== Reception ===
MTV News' James Montgomery reviewed the video, saying, "It's a clip that packs an emotional wallop, a downright beautiful examination of the ebbs and flows of love and the true connection that continues once our time here is over. That's a rare thing indeed, and so is this video ... it is understated and elegant and really truly touching." Kendall Russ of The Michigan Daily gave it an "A" grade, and said it "renders a profoundly different experience than does simply listening to it. It moves, it captivates, but above all, it shows an artist working with unblemished artistic vision".

Timberlake's grandmother, Sadie Bomar, told Italian weekly Grazia that "Justin didn't tell me he was doing it [making the video], it was a surprise. He said, "You have to see this video, just you sit down and watch it". I was moved by it, it brings tears to my eyes. It's a lovely tribute to us." Timberlake took home the award for Video of the Year at the 2013 MTV Video Music Awards. The video also won the award for Best Editing. It was named one of the 10 best music videos of the year by The Hollywood Reporter and Spin. Maura Johnston from Spin wrote, "The love scenes between the elder version of the couple are particularly touching; when it's eventually revealed that they've been happening only in the woman's mind, they become heartbreaking. Plus, there's some fine JT dance moves: Wearing a long coat, silver-tipped shoes, and a severe side part, he shows off his footwork in a hall of mirrors, creating an illusion of endless Justins."

== Live performances ==
"Mirrors" was performed on The Ellen DeGeneres Show and Saturday Night Live. On February 20, 2013, Timberlake performed the song at the 2013 Brit Awards. On August 25, 2013, he performed "Mirrors" in a medley with other songs of his at the 2013 MTV Video Music Awards. After the performance, he accepted the Michael Jackson Video Vanguard Award at the ceremony.

The song was featured on Justin and Jay-Z's co-headlining Legends of the Summer Stadium Tour (2013) and The Man of the Woods Tour (2018–2019), as well as being performed as the final song on the setlist of his two solo tours The 20/20 Experience World Tour (2013–2015) and The Forget Tomorrow World Tour (2024–2025), where he performed the song on a floating stage. Timberlake made a guest appearance on Taylor Swift's 1989 World Tour and they performed "Mirrors" together on August 26, 2015.

== Cover versions ==
In May 2013, Boyce Avenue released a version of the song with Fifth Harmony. The Huffington Post noted that the duet "makes for the perfect blend of harmonies – and a convincing love story told through lyrics." The cover was nominated for a YouTube Music Award. In the same month, Issues frontman Tyler Carter released a cover of Mirrors, while replacing the second verse with his own. In April 2013, Paradise Fears covered this song, with lead vocalist Sam Miller adding his own personal flair to it.

In June 2013, Cimorelli released their version of the song along with Big Time Rush member James Maslow. Amy Sciarretto of Pop Crush noted that the track "gets a boost from an added masculine element. Maslow's presence adds a whole other layer of harmony, too." In September 2013, Ellie Goulding also sang it in the Live Lounge. Entertainment Weekly wrote that she had added "some piano and a more soulful edge" and that "her vocal riffs give the tune a whole new flavor".

In August 2015, country singer Hunter Hayes performed a bluegrass version of the song at Nashville's famed Blackbird Studio for the YouTube channel CountryNow. Stephen L. Betts from Rolling Stone gave it a positive review, writing, "his performance focuses on a passionately delivered vocal laced with touches of R&B in his voice." Canadian country group Hunter Brothers recorded a cover of the song that was included on their debut studio album, Getaway, in March 2017. Indie groove band Goose performed a cover of the song at Goosemas X, in December 2023.

== Accolades ==
Awards and nominations for "Mirrors"
Organization	Year	Category	Result	Ref.
Teen Choice Awards	2013	Choice Love Song	Nominated	
MuchMusic Video Awards	2013	International Video of the Year – Artist	Nominated	
MTV Video Music Awards	2013	Video of the Year	Won	
MTV Video Music Awards	2013	Best Male Video	Nominated	
MTV Video Music Awards	2013	Best Pop Video	Nominated	
MTV Video Music Awards	2013	Best Editing in a Video	Won	
MTV Europe Music Awards	2013	Best Video	Nominated	
Soul Train Music Awards	2013	The Ashford and Simpson Songwriters Award	Nominated	
UK Music Video Awards	2013	Best Pop Video – International	Nominated	
People's Choice Awards	2014	Favorite Song	Nominated	
Billboard Music Awards	2014	Top Radio Song	Nominated	
Grammy Awards	2014	Best Pop Solo Performance	Nominated	
iHeartRadio Music Awards	2014	Song of the Year	Nominated	
International Dance Music Awards (WMC)	2014	Best R&B/Urban Dance Track	Nominated	
RTHK International Pop Poll Awards	2014	Top 10 International Gold Songs	Won	
BMI Pop Awards	2014	Award Winning Songs	Won	
ASCAP Pop Music Awards	2014	Most Performed Songs	Won	
ASCAP Pop Music Awards	2015	Most Performed Songs	Won	

== Track listings ==
CD single

1. "Mirrors" – 8:05
2. "Suit & Tie" (Radio Edit) featuring Jay Z – 4:29

Digital download

1. "Mirrors" – 8:05

Digital download (Radio Edit)

1. "Mirrors" (Radio Edit) – 4:37

== Credits and personnel ==
Credits are adapted from the liner notes of The 20/20 Experience.

=== Locations ===
- Vocals recorded and mixed at Larrabee Sound Studios, North Hollywood, California

=== Personnel ===
- Timothy "Timbaland" Mosley – producer, songwriter
- Justin Timberlake – mixer, producer, songwriter, vocal producer, vocal arranger, guitar
- Jerome "J-Roc" Harmon – keyboards, producer, songwriter
- James Fauntleroy – songwriter
- Chris Godbey – engineer, mixer
- Jimmy Douglass – mixer
- Alejandro Baima – assistant engineer
- Elliot Ives – guitar
- Benjamin Wright and The Benjamin Wright Orchestra – strings

== Charts ==
=== Weekly charts ===
2013–2015 weekly chart performance for "Mirrors"
Chart (2013–2015)	Peak position
Australia (ARIA)	10
Australia Urban (ARIA)	1
Austria (Ö3 Austria Top 40)	7
Belgium (Ultratop 50 Flanders)	17
Belgium (Ultratop 50 Wallonia)	35
Brazil Hot 100 Airplay (Billboard Brasil)	26
Bulgaria Airplay (BAMP)	1
Canada Hot 100 (Billboard)	4
Canada AC (Billboard)	1
Canada Hot AC (Billboard)	1
Canada CHR/Top 40 (Billboard)	1
Czech Republic Airplay (ČNS IFPI)	14
Czech Republic Singles Digital (ČNS IFPI)	90
Denmark (Tracklisten)	4
Euro Digital Song Sales (Billboard)	1
Finland (Suomen virallinen lista)	12
France (SNEP)	15
Germany (GfK)	2
Hungary (Rádiós Top 40)	2
Hungary (Single Top 40)	6
Iceland (RÚV)	3
Ireland (IRMA)	5
Israel International Airplay (Media Forest)	1
Italy (FIMI)	14
Italy Airplay (EarOne)	7
Japan Hot 100 (Billboard)	88
Lebanon (Lebanese Top 20)	1
Luxembourg Digital Song Sales (Billboard)	6
Mexico Airplay (Billboard)	48
Mexico Ingles Airplay (Billboard)	6
Netherlands (Dutch Top 40)	7
Netherlands (Single Top 100)	10
New Zealand (Recorded Music NZ)	7
Norway (VG-lista)	7
Poland Airplay (ZPAV)	1
Portugal Digital Song Sales (Billboard)	9
Romania Airplay (Media Forest)	9
Scottish Singles Sales (Official Charts)	1
Slovakia Airplay (ČNS IFPI)	3
Slovenia Airplay (SloTop50)	5
South Africa Airplay (EMA)	2
South Korea International (Gaon)	3
Spain (Promusicae)	19
Sweden (Sverigetopplistan)	16
Switzerland (Schweizer Hitparade)	5
UK Singles (Official Charts)	1
UK Airplay (Music Week)	1
UK Hip Hop/R&B (Official Charts)	1
US Billboard Hot 100	2
US Adult Contemporary (Billboard)	3
US Adult Pop Airplay (Billboard)	1
US Dance Airplay (Billboard)	12
US Latin Airplay (Billboard)	45
US Pop Airplay (Billboard)	1
US Rhythmic Airplay (Billboard)	1

2020s weekly chart performance for "Mirrors"
Chart (2020–2026)	Peak position
Global 200 (Billboard)	150
Netherlands (Single Top 100)	99
Norway (VG-lista)	84
Norway Airplay (IFPI)	87
Portugal (AFP)	135

=== Year-end charts ===
2013 year-end chart performance for "Mirrors"
Chart (2013)	Position
Australia (ARIA)	47
Australia Urban (ARIA)	12
Austria (Ö3 Austria Top 40)	42
Belgium (Ultratop 50 Flanders)	66
Belgium (Ultratop Flanders Urban)	17
Belgium (Ultratop 50 Wallonia)	78
Brazil (Crowley)	46
Canada (Canadian Hot 100)	16
Denmark (Tracklisten)	15
France (SNEP)	74
Germany (Media Control AG)	16
Hungary (Rádiós Top 40)	19
Italy (FIMI)	50
Ireland (IRMA)	15
Israel (Media Forest)	7
Lebanon (The Official Lebanese Top 20)	6
Moldova (Media Forest)	12
Netherlands (Dutch Top 40)	32
Netherlands (Mega Single Top 100)	41
New Zealand (Recorded Music NZ)	20
Slovenia (SloTop50)	18
South Korea (Gaon International Chart)	61
Sweden (Sverigetopplistan)	45
Switzerland (Schweizer Hitparade)	26
UK Singles (Official Charts)	10
US Billboard Hot 100	6
US Adult Contemporary (Billboard)	10
US Adult Top 40 (Billboard)	15
US Mainstream Top 40 (Billboard)	6
US Rhythmic (Billboard)	10

2014 year-end chart performance for "Mirrors"
Chart (2014)	Position
US Adult Contemporary (Billboard)	27

== Certifications and sales ==
Certifications and sales for "Mirrors"
Region	Certification	Certified units/sales
Australia (ARIA)	3× Platinum	210,000^{‡}
Austria (IFPI Austria)	Gold	15,000^{*}
Brazil (Pro-Música Brasil)	3× Diamond	750,000^{‡}
Canada (Music Canada)	3× Platinum	240,000^{*}
Denmark (IFPI Danmark)	Gold	15,000^{^}
Germany (BVMI)	3× Gold	900,000^{‡}
Italy (FIMI)	2× Platinum	100,000^{‡}
Mexico (AMPROFON)	Platinum	60,000^{*}
New Zealand (RMNZ)	5× Platinum	150,000^{‡}
Portugal (AFP)	Platinum	20,000^{‡}
South Korea (Gaon Chart)	—	109,941
Spain (Promusicae)	Platinum	60,000^{‡}
Sweden (GLF)	2× Platinum	80,000^{‡}
Switzerland (IFPI Switzerland)	Platinum	30,000^{^}
United Kingdom (BPI)	3× Platinum	1,800,000^{‡}
United States (RIAA)	2× Platinum	3,900,000
Streaming
Denmark (IFPI Danmark)	3× Platinum	5,400,000^{†}
^{*} Sales figures based on certification alone.^{^} Shipments figures based on certification alone.^{‡} Sales+streaming figures based on certification alone.^{†} Streaming-only figures based on certification alone.

== Release history ==
Release dates and formats for "Mirrors"
Country	Date	Format	Version	Label	Ref.
Various	February 11, 2013	Digital download	Album version	RCA	
Germany	March 1, 2013	CD single	Album version	Sony	
Various	March 13, 2013	Digital download	Radio edit	RCA	
United States	April 9, 2013	Rhythmic contemporary; contemporary hit radio	Radio edit	RCA	
Italy	April 12, 2013	Contemporary hit radio	Radio edit	Sony	
United States	April 22, 2013	Adult contemporary radio	Radio edit	RCA	
United States	May 14, 2013	Urban contemporary radio	Radio edit	RCA	

== See also ==
- List of best-selling singles
- List of UK Singles Chart number ones of the 2010s
