= James Fauntleroy =

American singer and songwriter (born 1984)

- Born: James Edward Fauntleroy II; May 16, 1984 (age 42)
- Origin: Inglewood, California, U.S.
- Genres: Pop; R&B; psychedelia
- Occupations: Singer; songwriter; record producer
- Instruments: Vocals; guitar; percussion
- Years active: 2006–present
- Publisher: Reservoir
- Formerly of: 1500 or Nothin'; Cocaine 80s; The Y's

James Edward Fauntleroy II (born May 16, 1984) is an American singer, songwriter, record producer, and community builder from Inglewood, California. He is known for his extensive songwriting and vocal work for artists including Bruno Mars, Justin Timberlake, Rihanna, Beyoncé, Lady Gaga, Travis Scott, Frank Ocean, Kendrick Lamar, SZA, Drake, J. Cole, Vince Staples, Jhené Aiko, Big Sean, Jay-Z, Chris Brown, and John Mayer. A four-time Grammy Award winner, Fauntleroy is also the co-founder of educational and workforce initiatives such as Laboratory and All New, both of which focus on entrepreneurship, music education, and economic development in South Los Angeles.

== Early life ==
James Edward Fauntleroy II was born on May 16, 1984, in Inglewood, California. He attended the Los Angeles Center for Enriched Studies (LACES), a magnet school attended by several future artists, including Lauren Halsey. Growing up in Inglewood, he was influenced by the sounds and culture of his surroundings, which exposed him to a wide range of R&B, gospel, and hip-hop.

Although he originally planned to pursue a career as a visual artist and studied graphic design, Fauntleroy shifted his focus toward music after joining his school and church choirs. These early experiences nurtured his interest in songwriting and provided the foundation for his career in music. Years later, Fauntleroy learned that music had also been part of his family background, including relatives such as his aunt, singer Patty Lemann.

== Musical career ==
=== Beginnings ===
Fauntleroy began his professional songwriting career working with The Underdogs. His first major success came with "No Air" (2008), recorded by Jordin Sparks and Chris Brown, which became an international hit and one of the best-selling singles of 2008.

Following the success of "No Air", Fauntleroy co-wrote several tracks for Chris Brown’s album Exclusive (2007), including "Take You Down", "Help Me", and "Lottery". He also contributed to Rihanna’s Rated R (2009), writing songs such as "Te Amo", "Cold Case Love", and "Photographs". Around the same period, he began collaborating with Brandy, co-writing "True" and "Camouflage" for her album Human (2008).

During these years, Fauntleroy connected with peers who would become long-time collaborators, including Hit-Boy, Frank Ocean, producer Brian Kennedy, and future members of 1500 or Nothin’, laying the foundation for a number of collaborations and partnerships that extended into the next decade.

=== Breakthrough and 2010s ===
By the early 2010s, Fauntleroy had become a sought-after songwriter and vocalist across R&B, pop, and hip hop. He co-founded the alternative R&B collective Cocaine 80s with producer No I.D. and rapper Common, releasing a series of EPs between 2011 and 2013 that built a cult following for their experimental blend of soul, hip hop, and electronic textures. The group’s music was later re-released digitally, further expanding its reach.

In 2011, Fauntleroy provided vocals for five songs on Common's The Dreamer/The Believer album. He appeared on "Dreamer (feat. Maya Angelou)," "Gold," "Cloth," "Celebrate," and "Windows." He also provided vocals to Frank Ocean's 2011 song "American Wedding" on his debut mixtape, Nostalgia, Ultra.

In 2012, he contributed vocals to Kanye West's first G.O.O.D. Music collaborative album, Cruel Summer. He appears on "Clique," "Higher," "Sin City," and "The One."

In 2013, Fauntleroy made appearances on Drake's "Girls Love Beyoncé," Nipsey Hussle's Crenshaw, Travis Scott's Owl Pharaoh, J. Cole's Born Sinner, and Big Sean's Hall of Fame. He also contributed writing and additional vocals to New Kids on the Block's 10 (2013) and Jay-Z's Magna Carta Holy Grail (2013). That year, Fauntleroy performed at the 2013 Soul Train Music Awards. On November 15, 2013, Timbaland released "Know Bout Me," the first single from his album Textbook Timbo, featuring Jay-Z.

Most notably, Fauntleroy co-wrote every song on Justin Timberlake's The 20/20 Experience (2013) and twelve further tracks on the follow-up album, The 20/20 Experience – 2 of 2 (2013). In 2014, Fauntleroy won the Grammy Award for Best R&B Song for co-writing the album's track "Pusher Love Girl". "Mirrors" currently sits with over a billion streams on Spotify.

In 2015, Fauntleroy wrote four tracks on Rihanna's eighth studio album Anti (released in 2016) and appeared on Kendrick Lamar's album To Pimp a Butterfly, which was nominated for Album of the Year at the 58th Annual Grammy Awards. Rihanna’s ‘Anti’ Is The First Album By A Black Female Artist To Spend 200 Weeks On The Billboard 200 showing the massive reach of the project. "James Joint" is named after James himself.

In 2016, Fauntleroy also went on to work closely with Bruno Mars, co-writing hits such as "That's What I Like", "Versace on the Floor", and "Finesse (Remix)". Fauntleroy co-wrote seven tracks on Bruno Mars' third studio album 24K Magic.

His work during this period also included writing and vocal contributions for J. Cole, Kendrick Lamar, and Big Sean, further cementing his reputation as a central figure in shaping contemporary R&B and pop. Fauntleroy’s collaborations also extended to Beyoncé and Jay-Z, contributing to "Part II (On the Run)" on Magna Carta…Holy Grail (2013) and "Summer" from Everything Is Love (2018).

=== 2019 to present ===
From 2019 onward, Fauntleroy continued to write and co-write for some of the biggest names in popular music.

He co-wrote "Please Me" (2019), the collaboration between Cardi B and Bruno Mars, which reached the top ten of the Billboard Hot 100. A year later, Fauntleroy co-wrote "Friends" for BTS's Map of the Soul: 7, contributing to the album’s global chart success.

In 2021, he contributed to An Evening with Silk Sonic, the collaborative album between Bruno Mars and Anderson .Paak, co-writing songs including "Put On a Smile" and "After Last Night" (featuring Thundercat and Bootsy Collins). The album went on to win multiple Grammy Awards, including Record of the Year for "Leave the Door Open".

Also in that year, Fauntleroy appeared as a co-writer and featured vocalist on DJ Khaled's "Sorry Not Sorry" alongside Nas and Jay-Z, from the album Khaled Khaled. The album debuted at number one on the Billboard 200, marking Fauntleroy’s contribution to another chart-topping release.

In 2022, Fauntleroy co-wrote "Stay with Me" by Calvin Harris, Justin Timberlake, Halsey, and Pharrell Williams, as well as contributed to Rihanna's "Born Again" from the soundtrack of Black Panther: Wakanda Forever. This project marked another chapter in Fauntleroy’s contributions to major film soundtracks, with his most recent being "Everything Goes With Blue" and "Big Dreams" from The Smurfs Movie soundtrack (2025) via Roc Nation Distribution.

In 2024, Fauntleroy co-wrote "Die with a Smile" by Lady Gaga and Bruno Mars. The single debuted at number three on the Billboard Hot 100 and later reached number one in January 2025. It broke multiple streaming records, including becoming the fastest song to reach both one and two billion streams on Spotify, and was certified multi-platinum or diamond in more than a dozen countries. The track won Best Pop Duo/Group Performance at the 67th Annual Grammy Awards and was nominated for Song of the Year.

In 2025, Fauntleroy co-wrote "I Think You're Special" on Justin Bieber's album Swag II, marking his first credited collaboration with Bieber. He also contributed to "Zombieboy" from Lady Gaga’s 2025 album Mayhem, expanding his catalog to more than 210 officially credited songs on Spotify.

== Solo projects ==
Beyond his work for other artists, Fauntleroy has released music under his own name and through collaborations. He co-founded the R&B collective Cocaine 80s (2011–2013) and re-released its catalog through Platoon in 2023 under the name The 80s. He also issued String Theory Acoustic (2014), a minimalist acoustic project.

In 2023, Fauntleroy released Nova, a collaborative album with Terrace Martin, blending progressive R&B, jazz, and electronic elements. It was nominated for Best Progressive R&B Album at the 66th Annual Grammy Awards (2024). In 2024, he partnered with Platoon to release "The Warmest Winter Ever", a holiday-themed project.

== Brand partnerships ==
Outside of his work as a songwriter and recording artist, Fauntleroy has pursued an active career in design, product development, and branding.

His first major partnership came with Disney, where he designed the Mickey Mouse "Leader of the Club" Milestone Statue for D23 Gold Members, part of Disney’s 100th anniversary (Disney100) celebration. The statue, created with Darren Romanelli (DRx), features a stylish varsity jacket with the Disney100 logo, Black Panther pin, and chrome finish. The statue was unveiled at the 2022 D23 Expo and sent to all D23 members.

Fauntleroy has also worked closely with gear and technology manufacturers who have supported his music and education efforts. His Roland partnership includes Beat Garden, a workshop series teaching individuals about beat making and music production. He has also worked with Fender, AVID, Microsoft, and Pioneer DJ in educational settings, helping provide access to instruments, software, and resources for emerging musicians.

His branding work extends into lifestyle and fashion, with collaborations involving Airbnb and Anti Social Social Club, among others.

In partnership with Goodwill Industries International, Fauntleroy has supported numerous projects and campaigns, contributing to events, messaging, and creative initiatives that blend music, design, and social impact.

== Community, education, and philanthropy ==
Fauntleroy’s community engagement began through the collective 1500 or Nothin’, which evolved into the educational venture 1500 Sound Academy (2019) in Inglewood. The academy offers courses in songwriting, production, and music business and has partnered with Roland and Gibson Gives to expand internationally to Bangkok, Beijing, and Taipei.

In 2025, Fauntleroy founded Laboratory, a workforce and economic development program centered on entrepreneurship in South Los Angeles. Laboratory operates classrooms, retail storefronts, and content production studios that connect the community with resources for emerging businesses. Its mission focuses on three pillars: educate, employ, and empower.

Alongside Laboratory, he launched All NEW, a platform creating opportunities for underrepresented creatives. Its early programming included Beat Garden workshops for foster youth hosted with Roland and NFL Media.

He also supports the Stax Music Academy in Memphis and continues collaborations with Goodwill Industries International on campaigns that combine music, design, and community impact.

== Awards and nominations ==
=== ASCAP Awards ===
Year	Award	Nominated work	Result
2018	ASCAP Pop Music Awards	"That's What I Like" (Bruno Mars)	Won
2018	ASCAP Rhythm & Soul Music Awards	(Bruno Mars)	Won
2019	ASCAP Rhythm & Soul Music Awards	"That's What I Like" (Bruno Mars)	Won
2020	ASCAP Rhythm & Soul Music Awards	"Please Me" (Cardi B & Bruno Mars)	Won
2025	ASCAP Pop Music Awards	"Die with a Smile" (Lady Gaga & Bruno Mars)	Won

=== Grammy Awards ===
James Fauntleroy has won four awards out of eight nominations.

Year	Nominee / work	Award	Result
2014	"Pusher Love Girl" (As a songwriter)	Best R&B Song	Won
2015	BEYONCÉ (featured artist)	Album of the Year	Nominated
2016	To Pimp a Butterfly (featured artist)	Album of the Year	Nominated
2018	"That's What I Like" (As a songwriter)	Song of the Year	Won
2018	"That's What I Like" (As a songwriter)	Best R&B Song	Won
2018	"24K Magic" (As a songwriter)	Album of the Year	Won
2024	Nova (with Terrace Martin)	Best Progressive R&B Album	Nominated
2025	Die With A Smile	Song of The Year	Nominated

=== Certifications and sales milestones ===
- "That's What I Like" — certified Diamond by the RIAA in the U.S.; multi-platinum in several other countries.
- "No Air" — sold over 3.5 million copies in the U.S.; certified Platinum internationally.
- "Mirrors" and other songs co-written by Fauntleroy, including "Finesse (Remix)", "Please Me", and "Versace on the Floor", have achieved multi-platinum certifications and hundreds of millions of streams worldwide.
- "Die with a Smile" — co-written by Fauntleroy and performed by Lady Gaga and Bruno Mars, has achieved multi-platinum certifications internationally, sold over one million units in the United States, and became the fastest song in Spotify history to surpass one billion streams.

=== Civic recognition ===
In 2023, the City of Inglewood declared January 15 as "1500 Day", honoring Fauntleroy and the 1500 or Nothin’ collective for their contributions to music and the arts.

== Legacy and influence ==
Fauntleroy is widely regarded as one of the most influential songwriters of his generation, helping to shape the sound of contemporary R&B and pop through collaborations with artists such as Bruno Mars, Justin Timberlake, Beyoncé, Rihanna, and Lady Gaga. His writing is noted for blending intricate melodic structures with accessible hooks, a style that has influenced both mainstream and alternative R&B. Beyond his catalog of hits, Fauntleroy has impacted the next generation of creators through his work with educational initiatives including 1500 Sound Academy, Laboratory, and All New. His integration of music with design, 3D modeling, and community programs has positioned him as a figure who bridges creative artistry with broader cultural and social influence.
