= James Fauntleroy discography =

This is the discography for American pop singer songwriter James Fauntleroy.

== Albums ==
=== Extended plays ===
==== Solo ====
- String Theory Acoustic (2014)
- Warmest Winter II (2016)
- DOJO (2017)
- NOVA (with Terrace Martin) (2023)
- The Warmest Winter Ever (2023)

==== As Cocaine 80s ====
- The Pursuit (2011)
- Ghost Lady (2011)
- Express OG (2012)
- The Flower of Life (2013)

=== Mixtapes ===
- Leading by Example (2010)
- The Warmest Winter Ever (2014)
- The Coldest Summer Ever (2015)

== Singles ==
=== As a featured artist ===
List of singles as a featured artist, with selected chart positions, showing year released and album name
Title	Year	Peak chart positions		Album
Title	Year	US	US R&B	Album
"Know Bout Me" (Timbaland featuring Drake, Jay-Z and James Fauntleroy)	2013	—	57	Non-Album single
"Sorry Not Sorry" (DJ Khaled featuring Nas, Jay-Z, James Fauntleroy & Harmonies by the Hive)	2021	30	13	Khaled Khaled
"—" denotes a recording that did not chart or was not released in that territory.

== Other charted songs ==
List of songs, with selected chart positions, showing year released and album name
Title	Year	Peak chart positions		Album
Title	Year	US	US R&B	Album
"Born Sinner" (J. Cole featuring James Fauntleroy)	2013	—	53	Born Sinner
"How Much a Dollar Cost" (Kendrick Lamar featuring James Fauntleroy and Ronald Isley)	2015	109	40	To Pimp a Butterfly
"Girls Love Beyoncé" (Drake featuring James Fauntleroy)	2019	105	—	Care Package
"—" denotes a recording that did not chart or was not released in that territory.

== Guest appearances ==
List of non-single guest appearances, with other performing artists, showing year released and album name
Title	Year	Artist(s)	Album
"Love Don't Live Here No More"	2006	Snoop Dogg	Love Don't Live Here No More: Doggy Tales, Vol 1
"Shades"	2010	Diddy-Dirty Money, Lil Wayne, Justin Timberlake & Bilal	Last Train to Paris
"American Wedding"	2011	Frank Ocean	nostalgia, ULTRA.
"Clique"	2012	Kanye West, Big Sean & Jay-Z	Cruel Summer
"100"	2012	Big Sean, Kendrick Lamar & Royce da 5'9	Detroit
"Other Bitch Callin'"	2012	Travis Mills	Thrillionare
"Woke Up"	2013	Big Sean, Say it Aint Tone, Early Mac & Mike Posner	Detroit
"Drive"	2013	Travi$ Scott	Owl Pharaoh
"Born Sinner"	2013	J. Cole	Born Sinner
"No Wrong No Right"	2013	Terrace Martin & Robert Glasper	3ChordFold
"World Ablaze"	2013	Big Sean	Hall of Fame
"If U Were Mine"	2013	Nipsey Hussle & Sade	Crenshaw
"Come Over"	2013	Nipsey Hussle	Crenshaw
"Only When I Walk Away"	2013	Justin Timberlake, Timbaland & Brenda Radney	The 20/20 Experience – 2 of 2
"Nate"	2014	Vince Staples	Shyne Coldchain Vol. 2
"Members Only"	2014	HS87, Hit-Boy, Audio Push, B-Mac the Queen, Kent M$NEY & K. Roosevelt	We the Plug
"Deeper"	2014	Omarion	Sex Playlist
"It's Yours"	2014	Terrace Martin, Robert Glasper & Thundercat	3ChordFold Pulse
"Smokin' in My Car"	2014	Jade de LaFleur	Jaded
"How Much a Dollar Cost?"	2015	Kendrick Lamar & Ronald Isley	To Pimp a Butterfly
"West Side Highway"	2015	A$AP Rocky	At. Long. Last. ASAP
"For the World"	2015	The Internet	Ego Death
"LA"	2015	Ty Dolla $ign, Kendrick Lamar, Brandy	Free TC
"Desperado"	2016	Rihanna	Anti
"Change Things"	2016	Ingrid	Trill Feels
"Another Summer"	2016	DJ Mustard, Rick Ross & John Legend	Cold Summer
"Charleville 9200"	2016	Snoh Aalegra	Don't Explain
"Wavy (Interlude)"	2017	SZA	Ctrl
"Legacy"	2017	Jay-Z	4:44
"Finesse"	2018	Drake	Scorpion
"March 14"	2018	Drake	Scorpion
"Girls Love Beyoncé"	2019	Drake	Care Package
"The Wave"	2021	Amorphous, Brandy	Things Take Shape
"On My Mind"	2021	Snoh Aalegra	Temporary Highs in the Violet Skies

== Writing discography ==
Writing credits adapted from ASCAP.

Song	Performer	Credits	Album
"Fuel"	Mishon	Writer	Dorm Room Music
"Doorway"	Elliott Yamin	Writer	Fight for Love
"Forever in You"	Elliott Yamin	Writer	Fight for Love
"No Air" (featuring. Chris Brown)	Jordin Sparks	Co-Writer	Jordin Sparks
"Say" (featuring. T-Pain)	Timbaland	Co-Writer	Unreleased
"I'm a Believer"	Timbaland	Writer	Unreleased
"Back Together"	Timbaland	Writer	Unreleased
Musta' Heard	"Uncle" Charlie Wilson	Co-Writer	Uncle Charlie
"Can't Live Without You"	"Uncle" Charlie Wilson	Co-Writer	Uncle Charlie
"Love, Love, Love"	"Uncle" Charlie Wilson	Co-Writer	Uncle Charlie
"Thinkin' of You"	"Uncle" Charlie Wilson	Co-Writer	Uncle Charlie
"Drive"	Travi$ Scott	Co-Writer, Featured guest	Owl Pharaoh
"Home"	Brandy	Writer	Unreleased
"Who's the Loser Now?"	Brandy	Writer	Unreleased
"Drum Life"	Brandy	Writer	Unreleased
"Stand Back"	Brandy	Writer	Unreleased
"Long Distance"	Brandy	Vocal Producer	Human
"Torn Down"	Brandy	Co-Writer & Vocal Producer	Human
"Sweet Revenge"	Chris Cornell	Co-Writer & backing vocals	Scream
"Get Up"	Chris Cornell	Co-Writer & backing vocals	Scream
"Do Me Wrong"	Chris Cornell	Co-Writer	Scream
"Stop Me"	Chris Cornell	Co-Writer & backing vocals	Scream
"Shades" (featuring. Lil Wayne, Justin Timberlake, Bilal & James Fauntleroy)	Diddy-Dirty Money	Co-Writer, featured vocals, vocal production, backing vocals	Last Train to Paris
"Angels" (featuring. The Notorious B.I.G. & Rick Ross)	Diddy-Dirty Money	Co-Writer	Last Train to Paris
"First Place Loser"	Diddy-Dirty Money	Co-Writer	Last Train to Paris
"Running"	David Archuleta	Co-Writer	David Archuleta
"My Hands"	David Archuleta	Co-Writer	David Archuleta
"Zero Gravity"	David Archuleta	Co-Writer	Unreleased
"One"	Dan Talevski	Co-Writer	Unreleased
"Paparazzi"	James Fauntleroy	Writer	Unreleased
"Best Part"	James Fauntleroy	Writer	Unreleased
"Baby"	James Fauntleroy	Co-Writer	Unreleased
"All About You" (featuring. Alain Whyte)	James Fauntleroy	Co-Writer	Unreleased
"Bad Prayer"	James Fauntleroy	Co-Writer	Unreleased
"Just Me & You"	James Fauntleroy	Writer	Unreleased
"Make Your Body Talk to Me (Choreography)"	James Fauntleroy	Writer	Unreleased
"Starlight"	Denise Lara	Writer	Unreleased
"Walls Up"	Tynisha Keli	Writer	The Chronicles of TK
"Dynamite"	J.A.G.	Co-Writer	Unreleased
"Bigger Than the World" (featuring. Justin Timberlake)	Esmée Denters	Co-Writer	Outta Here
"Follow My Lead" (featuring. Justin Timberlake)	Esmée Denters	Co-Writer	Outta Here
"Get at Ya' "	Chris Brown	Co-Writer	Exclusive
"Help Me"	Chris Brown	Co-Writer	Exclusive
"Lottery"	Chris Brown	Writer	Exclusive
"Take You Down"	Chris Brown	Writer	Exclusive
"Superhuman" (featuring. Keri Hilson)	Chris Brown	Writer	Exclusive: The Forever Edition
"I Lost You"	Katharine McPhee	Writer	Unreleased
"Just Let Me Know"	Katharine McPhee	Writer	Unreleased
"The Dreamer" (featuring. Maya Angelou)	Common	Co-Writer	The Dreamer/The Believer
"The Neighborhood" (featuring. Lil' Herb & Cocaine 80s)	Common	Co-Writer & Featured vocals	Nobody's Smiling
"Young Hearts Run Free" (featuring. Cocaine 80s)	Common	Co-Writer & Featured vocals	Nobody's Smiling
"Einstein"	Kelly Clarkson	Co-Writer	Stronger
"Born Sinner"	J. Cole	Co-Writer & Feature	Born Sinner
"Disappearing Acts"	Ginuwine	Co-Writer & featured guest	Unreleased
"Winner" (featuring. Justin Timberlake & T.I.)	Jamie Foxx	Co-Writer, Co-Producer	Best Night of My Life
"Nate"	Vince Staples	Co-Writer/ Featured	Shyne Coldchain Vol. 2
"If U Were Mine" (featuring. Sade & James Fauntleroy)	Nipsey Hussle	Co-Writer/ Featured	Crenshaw
"Come Over"	Nipsey Hussle	Co-Writer/ Featured	Crenshaw
"No Wrong, No Right" (featuring. Robert Glasper & James Fauntleroy)	Terrace Martin	Co-Writer/ Featured	3ChordFold
"Wrong Way"	Lalah Hathaway	Co-Writer	Where it all Begins
"Mannequin"	Britney Spears	Co-Writer, backing vocals	Circus
"Twisted"	New Kids On The Block	Writer	The Block
"What If?"	SoShy	Co-Writer	Crack the Code
"Don't Let Me Down"	Leona Lewis	Writer	Echo
"Love Sex Magic" (featuring. Justin Timberlake)	Ciara	Co-Writer	Fantasy Ride
"Magic (Demo)"	Justin Timberlake	Co-Writer	Unreleased
"If I" (featuring. T.I.)	Justin Timberlake	Co-Writer	The King's Men Mixtape
"Te Amo"	Rihanna	Co-writer	Rated R
"Wait Your Turn"	Rihanna	Co-writer	Rated R
"Fire Bomb"	Rihanna	Co-writer	Rated R
"G4L"	Rihanna	Co-writer	Rated R
"Cold Case Love"	Rihanna	Co-writer	Rated R
"The Last Song"	Rihanna	Co-writer	Rated R
"Get It Over With"	Rihanna	Co-writer	Rated R
"Hole in My Head" (featuring Justin Timberlake)	Rihanna	Co-writer	Rated R
"Dying for Your Love" (featuring. James Fauntleroy)	Frank Ocean	Featured Artist	Unreleased
"American Wedding"	Frank Ocean	Producer	nostalgia, ULTRA.
"Fertilizer"	Frank Ocean	Writer	channel ORANGE
"Fertilizer"	James Fauntleroy	Writer, Original artist	Unreleased
"They Don't Know"	Alexandra Burke	Writer	Overcome
"The Beginning..."	John Legend	Writer	Love in the Future
"Hold on Longer"	John Legend	Writer	Love in the Future
"What if I Told You? (Interlude)"	John Legend	Writer	Love in the Future
"Pusher Love Girl"	Justin Timberlake	Co-Writer	The 20/20 Experience
"Suit & Tie" (featuring. Jay-Z & Timbaland)	Justin Timberlake	Co-Writer	The 20/20 Experience
"Don't Hold the Wall" (featuring. Timbaland)	Justin Timberlake	Co-Writer	The 20/20 Experience
"Strawberry Bubblegum" (featuring. Timbaland)	Justin Timberlake	Co-Writer	The 20/20 Experience
"Tunnel Vision" (featuring. Timbaland)	Justin Timberlake	Co-Writer	The 20/20 Experience
"Spaceship Coupe"	Justin Timberlake	Co-Writer	The 20/20 Experience
"That Girl" (featuring. Timbaland & The Tennessee Kids)	Justin Timberlake	Co-Writer	The 20/20 Experience
"Let the Groove Get In"	Justin Timberlake	Co-Writer	The 20/20 Experience
Mirrors"	Justin Timberlake	Co-Writer	The 20/20 Experience
"Blue Ocean Floor"	Justin Timberlake	Co-Writer	The 20/20 Experience
"Dress On" (featuring. Timbaland)	Justin Timberlake	Co-Writer	The 20/20 Experience
"Body Count" (featuring. Timbaland)	Justin Timberlake	Co-Writer	The 20/20 Experience
"Gimme What I Don't Know (I Want)" (featuring. Timbaland)	Justin Timberlake	Co-Writer	The 20/20 Experience – 2 of 2
"Cabaret" (featuring. Drake & Timbaland)	Justin Timberlake	Co-Writer	The 20/20 Experience – 2 of 2
"TKO" (featuring. Timbaland)	Justin Timberlake	Co-Writer	The 20/20 Experience – 2 of 2
"Take Back the Night" (featuring. Timbaland)	Justin Timberlake	Co-Writer	The 20/20 Experience – 2 of 2
"Murder" (featuring. Jay-Z & Timbaland)	Justin Timberlake	Co-Writer	The 20/20 Experience – 2 of 2
"Drink You Away"	Justin Timberlake	Co-Writer	The 20/20 Experience – 2 of 2
"You Got It On"	Justin Timberlake	Co-Writer	The 20/20 Experience – 2 of 2
"Amnesia"	Justin Timberlake	Co-Writer	The 20/20 Experience – 2 of 2
"Only When I Walk Away" (featuring. Timbaland, Brenda Radney & James Fauntleroy)	Justin Timberlake	Co-Writer, featured artist, backing vocals	The 20/20 Experience – 2 of 2
"Not a Bad Thing"	Justin Timberlake	Co-Writer	The 20/20 Experience – 2 of 2
"Blindness"	Justin Timberlake	Co-Writer	The 20/20 Experience – 2 of 2
"Electric Lady" (featuring. Timbaland)	Justin Timberlake	Co-Writer	The 20/20 Experience – 2 of 2
"TKO (Black Friday Remix)" (featuring. J. Cole, A$AP Rocky & Pusha T)	Justin Timberlake	Co-Writer	"TKO"
"Bank Robber" (featuring. James Fauntleroy)	Justin Timberlake	Featured guest, Co-Writer, vocal producer	Unreleased
"Part II (On the Run)" (featuring Beyoncé Knowles)	Jay-Z	Co-Writer	Magna Carta... Holy Grail
"Just in Love"	Joe Jonas	Co-Writer	Fastlife
"Fastlife"	Joe Jonas	Co-Writer	Fastlife
"Sorry"	Joe Jonas	Co-Writer	Fastlife
"Dedicated" (featuring. Nas)	Mariah Carey	Co-Writer, Background Vocals	Me. I Am Mariah... The Elusive Chanteuse
"Sinatra in the Sands" (featuring. Justin Timberlake, Timbaland & Jay-Z)	Nas	Co-Writer	TBA
"Know 'Bout Me" (featuring. Jay-Z, Drake & James Fauntleroy)	Timbaland	Backing vocals, Guest vocals & Co-Writer	Non-Album Single
"Clique" (featuring. Jay-Z)	GOOD Music	Backing vocals, Guest vocals & Co-Writer	Cruel Summer
"Higher" (featuring. Ma$e & Cocaine 80s)	GOOD Music	Backing vocals, Guest vocals & Co-Writer	Cruel Summer
"The One" (featuring. 2 Chainz & Marsha Ambrosius)	GOOD Music	Co-Writer, backing vocals	Cruel Summer
"Free Fall"	Beyoncé Knowles	Co-Writer	Unreleased
"Blow"	Beyoncé Knowles	Co-Writer	BEYONCÉ
"No Angel"	Beyoncé Knowles	Co-Writer	BEYONCÉ
"Nothing Is Stopping You"	Big Sean	Backing vocals, guest vocals (Uncredited)	Hall of Fame
"Fire"	Big Sean	Backing vocals, guest vocals (Uncredited)	Hall of Fame
"Sierra Leone"	Big Sean	Backing vocals, guest vocals (Uncredited)	Hall of Fame
"World Ablaze"	Big Sean	Co-Writer & Featured guest	Hall of Fame
"All Figured Out"	Big Sean	Backing vocals, guest vocals (Uncredited)	Hall of Fame
"Woke Up" (featuring. Say it Ain't Tone, Early Mac, Mike Posner & James Fauntleroy)	Big Sean	Co-Writer & Featured guest	Detroit
"It's Yours" (featuring. Robert Glasper, James Fauntleroy & Thundercat)	Terrace Martin	Co-Writer & Featured guest	3ChordFold Pulse
"These Walls" (featuring. Bilal, Anna Wise & Thundercat)	Kendrick Lamar	Co-Writer & backing vocals	To Pimp a Butterfly
"How Much a Dollar Cost?" (featuring. James Fauntleroy & Ronald Isley)	Kendrick Lamar	Co-Writer, Featured Vocals	To Pimp a Butterfly
"The Blacker the Berry" (featuring. Assassin)	Kendrick Lamar	Backing Vocals	To Pimp a Butterfly
Mortal Man	Kendrick Lamar	Backing Vocals	To Pimp a Butterfly
"California Roll" (featuring. Stevie Wonder & Pharrell Williams)	Snoop Dogg	Co-Writer	BUSH
"Resistance" (featuring Jhené Aiko)	Hudson Mohawke	Co-Writer	Lantern
"Might Be Wrong" (featuring Haneef Talib & eeeeeeee)	Vince Staples	Co-Writer, featured Vocals	Summertime '06
"LA" (featuring. Kendrick Lamar & James Fauntleroy)	Ty Dolla $ign	Co-Writer, featured Vocals	Free TC
"For the World" (featuring. James Fauntleroy)	The Internet	Co-Writer, featured Vocals	Ego Death
"Partners in Crime: Part Three"	The Internet	Co-Writer	Ego Death
"Work from Home" (featuring. B.o.B)	Jordin Sparks	Co-Writer	Right Here Right Now
"Right Here Right Now"	Jordin Sparks	Co-Writer	Right Here Right Now
"James Joint"	Rihanna	Co-Writer,	Anti
"Desperado"	Rihanna	Co-Writer, Featured Vocals	Anti
"Higher"	Rihanna	Co-Writer	Anti
"Close to You"	Rihanna	Co-Writer	Anti
"Another Summer" (featuring Rick Ross, John Legend & James Fauntleroy)	DJ Mustard	Co-Writer & Featured vocalist	Cold Summer
"Chunky"	Bruno Mars	Co-Writer	24K Magic
"Perm"	Bruno Mars	Co-Writer	24K Magic
"That's What I Like"	Bruno Mars	Co-Writer	24K Magic
"Versace on the Floor"	Bruno Mars	Co-Writer	24K Magic
"Straight Up & Down"	Bruno Mars	Co-Writer	24K Magic
"Calling All My Lovelies"	Bruno Mars	Co-Writer	24K Magic
"Finesse"	Bruno Mars	Co-Writer	24K Magic
"Finesse (Remix)" (featuring Cardi B)	Bruno Mars	Co-Writer	"Finesse (Remix)"
"Armageddon"	Elijah Blake	Co-Writer	Shadows & Diamonds
"Wavy (Interlude)" (featuring James Fauntleroy)	SZA	Co-Writer & Featured vocalist	Ctrl
"Legacy"	Jay-Z	Backing vocals	4:44
"Filthy"	Justin Timberlake	Co-Writer	Man of the Woods
"Young Man"	Justin Timberlake	Co-Writer	Man of the Woods
"Finesse"	Drake	Co-Writer	Scorpion
"SoulMate"	Justin Timberlake	Co-Writer, Backing vocals	TBA
"Please Me"	Cardi B & Bruno Mars	Co-Writer	TBA
"True Kinda Love"	Estelle & Zach Callison	Co-Writer	Steven Universe: The Movie (Original Soundtrack)
"Isn't It Love?"	Estelle	Co-Writer	Steven Universe: The Movie (Original Soundtrack)
"Flux Capacitor"	Jay Electronica	Co-Writer	A Written Testimony
"Ezekiel's Wheel" (featuring The-Dream)	Jay Electronica	Co-Writer	A Written Testimony
"The Wave"	Amorphous, Brandy	Co-Writer	Things Take Shape
"Infinity Sex"	Justin Timberlake	Co-Writer	Everything I Thought It Was
"Die With A Smile" (with Bruno Mars)	Lady Gaga	Co-Writer	MAYHEM
"Zombieboy"	Lady Gaga	Co-Writer	MAYHEM
"I Think You're Special"	Justin Bieber	Co-Writer	Swag 2
