= Cabaret (Justin Timberlake song) =

Song by Justin Timberlake featuring Drake

from the album The 20/20 Experience – 2 of 2
- Released: September 27, 2013
- Recorded: 2013
- Studio: Jungle City (New York City)
- Genre: Pop; soul
- Length: 4:33
- Label: RCA
- Songwriters: Justin Timberlake; Timothy Mosley; Aubrey Graham; Jerome "J-Roc" Harmon; James Fauntleroy; Daniel Jones
- Producers: Timbaland; Justin Timberlake; Jerome "J-Roc" Harmon

"Cabaret" is a song by American singer Justin Timberlake featuring Canadian rapper Drake from the former's fourth studio album, The 20/20 Experience – 2 of 2 (2013). Timberlake co-wrote and co-produced the song with Timbaland, J-Roc, and Daniel Jones, with James Fauntleroy and Drake providing additional songwriting. It became available as the album's third track on September 27, 2013, when the album was released by RCA Records. "Cabaret" is a pop and soul song that features beatboxing, handclapping, guitars, and keyboards. Lyrically, it finds the singer comparing his love to a burlesque and features sexually oriented lyrics.

"Cabaret" received generally positive reviews from music critics, who noted its similarity to Timbaland's earlier works with singer Aaliyah and Timberlake's 2006 single "My Love". Timbaland's production and Drake's rap verse were also praised. Following the album's release, the track saw strong digital downloads, and it debuted on the charts in South Korea and the United States. It peaked at number 18 on the US Hot R&B Songs chart and at number 50 on the Gaon Chart in South Korea, selling over 3,800 digital copies in the latter country that week. Timberlake included "Cabaret" on the set list of his fifth concert tour, The 20/20 Experience World Tour (2013–2015).

== Composition ==
"Cabaret"
A twenty-seven-second sample of "Cabaret", a pop and soul song that features "stuttering beatboxing", mouth noises, and a classic-sounding beat provided by the producer Timbaland.

"Cabaret" was written by Timberlake, Timothy "Timbaland" Mosley, Aubrey Graham, Jerome "J-Roc" Harmon, James Fauntleroy, and Daniel Jones, and produced by Timbaland, Timberlake, and Harmon, with Jones providing additional production. It is a pop and soul song with a length of four minutes and thirty-three seconds (the shortest song on The 20/20 Experience – 2 of 2) that features "stuttering beatboxing". Kyle Anderson of Entertainment Weekly noted that the song builds a symphony of mouth noises and compared it to Aaliyah's 1998 single "Are You That Somebody?" Brad Stern of MTV Buzzworthy agreed with Anderson, however, labeled "Cabaret" as "a much more 'dirty-minded'" version of the former. ABC News' Allan Raible noticed the song's beat has a classic sounding Timbaland beat, which, according to him, "the kind of beat Aaliyah used to turn into gold". Arasia Graham of HipHopDX stated that "Cabaret" sounds like a 2013 answer to Timberlake's 2006 single "My Love".

Mikael Wood of Los Angeles Times stated that "Cabaret" is a "percolating bedroom jam that depicts sex as a form of at-home theater". Boston Globe's Sarah Rodman called the song a "sexed-up jam". HitFix's Melinda Newman described the song as a "loop-driven to getting down with your lady, who's taking off her clothes as quickly as she can". According to Eric Henderson of Slant Magazine, in "Cabaret", Timberlake compares the love to a burlesque and noted that the song resembles producer Timbaland's earlier work. Andy Kellman of AllMusic wrote that the song features Timbaland's signature sound and finds Timberlake proclaiming more "clever/nauseating" lyrics: "If sex is a contest, then you're coming first"; "'Cause I got you saying Jesus so much, it's like we're laying in a manger." The chorus consists of Timberlake singing "It's a cabaret" while being accompanied by Timbaland, who repeats "Put on a show, get on the floor". According to Stern, in his part with a duration about two minutes, Drake raps raunchy and fast-talking lines, "I'mma fuck you like we're having an affair". Nick Krewen of Toronto Star wrote that Drake raps lines "about a sexual tête-à-tête amidst a melee of scattershot rhythms". HotNewHipHop's Trevor Smith noticed the reference on Drake's verses to Lil Boosie's "Let Me Ease Your Mind".

== Critical reception ==
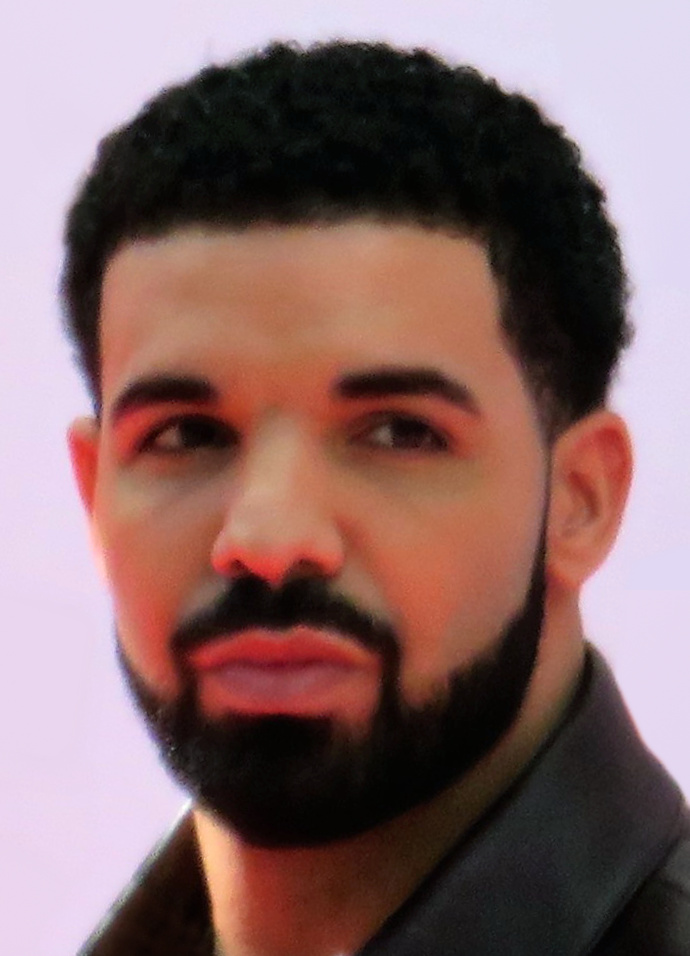
Drake's rap verse on the song received praise from music critics.

"Cabaret" received generally positive reviews from music critics. Even though giving mixed review to the album, Kellman of Allmusic called the song a "standout". Anderson of Entertainment Weekly chose "Cabaret" as the best song on the album, labeling it a "slick drum orgy with a ferocious Drake cameo". Similarly, Julia Leconte of Now selected the song as a top track on the album and stated that it has catchy hook and cheesy lyrics which only Timberlake can pull off. Mesfin Fekadu of The Huffington Post wrote that "the song is smooth and has an addictive hook". John Meagher of Irish Independent labeled the song "highly potent" and noted that it features Timberlake's "typical heavy-hitting approach".

Los Angeles Times's Wood praised Drake's verse and wrote that he "takes the sex talk to a level that Timberlake the boy-band veteran still can't". HitFix's Newman graded the song with a "B−" mark, and wrote that "Drake comes in for a rap that works perfectly with the song in their first collaboration". Dave Hanratty of Drowned in Sound stated that "Cabaret" feels "navel-gazing" as a result of Drake's braggadocios appearance and the mechanical input given by Timbaland. Entertainmentwise's Amy Gravelle stated that Drake is featured on the track to add substance and style and proves that he was the "hottest" rapper at the moment. A reviewer of Capital FM stated that the song proves why Drake was the rapper on everyone's lips and further described "Cabaret" as a smart team-up between the artists backed by Timbaland's classic beats. On the negative side, Lanre Bakare of The Guardian criticized the rapper's verse calling it "predictably self-indulgent". Vibe's Stacy-Ann Ellis noted that although Drake gives some "lover-boy swag" to the song, Jay-Z outperformed him with his verse on "Murder".

In a review of The 20/20 Experience – 2 of 2, Craig Manning of website AbsolutePunk wrote that even though the song features "a rapidfire" rap verse by Drake, both "Cabaret" and the lead single, "Take Back the Night", "feel somehow less impressive than a lot of the songs Timberlake was slinging last time around, if only because they don't add up to an 'experience' greater than the sum of their parts." According to Brice Ezell of PopMatters, "for whatever reason [the song] never gets off of the ground." Lydia Jenkin of New Zealand Herald opined that the song would be a lot of sexier without the overpowering bass pulses in its production and "some odd lyrics". Adelle Platon from Billboard dubbed the song "frisky" and Drake's verse "fit for a nightclub rendezvous." HotNewHipHop's Trevor Smith said "Cabaret" "it's a fitting addition to a solid catalogue that Timberlake has been developing since stepping foot (sic) in the game."

== Live performances ==
Timberlake included "Cabaret" on the set list of his fourth worldwide concert tour entitled The 20/20 Experience World Tour (2013–2015). In a review of the concert that took place at the United Center in Chicago on February 16, Claudia Perry of the Chicago Tribune wrote "the whole apparatus returned to the A position (hey, Timberlake likes golf) while he performed 'Cabaret' and 'Take Back the Night'."

== Credits and personnel ==
Credits are adapted from the liner notes of The 20/20 Experience – 2 of 2.

=== Locations ===
- Vocals recorded and mixed at Jungle City Studios, New York City

=== Personnel ===
- Timothy "Timbaland" Mosley – production
- Justin Timberlake – vocals, mixing, production, vocal production, vocal arrangement
- Jerome "J-Roc" Harmon – keyboards, production
- Drake – vocals
- Daniel Jones – keyboards
- Chris Godbey – engineering, mixing
- Jimmy Douglass – mixing
- Elliot Ives – recording, guitar

== Charts ==
Chart performance for "Cabaret"
Chart (2013)	Peak position
South Korea (Gaon Chart)	50
US Hot R&B Songs (Billboard)	18
