= Drink You Away =

Single by Justin Timberlake

from the album The 20/20 Experience – 2 of 2
- Released: November 23, 2015
- Recorded: 2012
- Studio: Larrabee Studios (North Hollywood)
- Genre: Classic rock; country pop; gospel blues; Memphis soul
- Length: 5:31 (album version); 4:15 (radio edit)
- Label: RCA Nashville
- Songwriters: Justin Timberlake; Timothy Mosley; Jerome "J-Roc" Harmon; James Fauntleroy
- Producers: Timbaland; Justin Timberlake; Jerome "J-Roc" Harmon

Justin Timberlake singles chronology
| "Love Never Felt So Good" (2014) | "Drink You Away" (2015) | "Can't Stop the Feeling!" (2016) |

"Drink You Away" is a song by American singer Justin Timberlake from his fourth studio album, The 20/20 Experience – 2 of 2 (2013). It was sent to US country radio stations as the fourth and final single from the album on November 23, 2015. It was written and produced by Timberlake, Timothy "Timbaland" Mosley and Jerome "J-Roc" Harmon, with additional writing from James Fauntleroy. Musically, critics described it as a multi-genre song that includes classic rock, country pop, gospel blues, and Memphis soul. Lyrically, on the track, Timberlake sings about how no amount of drinking can ease the pain of his broken heart, making references to several alcoholic brands, including Jack Daniel's and Jim Beam. As of May 2016, the song has sold over 600,000 copies in the US.

"Drink You Away" received a generally positive response from contemporary critics, with some of them labeling the song as a highlight and one of the most impressive moments on the album. Timberlake performed the song at the 2013 American Music Awards, and it was part of the set list of The 20/20 Experience World Tour (2013–15). In November 2015, the singer, together with Chris Stapleton, gave a rendition of the track at the 2015 Country Music Association Awards; following it, "Drink You Away" sold 76,000 digital copies and debuted at number five on the US Hot Digital Songs chart. It also peaked at number 85 on the Canadian Hot 100 chart.

== Background and release ==
On March 16, 2013, record producer and drummer for the Roots, Questlove announced that Timberlake was planning to release a follow-up record to The 20/20 Experience in November. He referenced the album's 10-song track listing and title by saying, "10 songs now...10 songs later = 20 vision". Affirming Questlove's comments, the album's co-producer J-Roc revealed that it would consist of outtakes from the original album, as well as new material from upcoming studio sessions. Timberlake announced on May 5 that his fourth studio album, The 20/20 Experience – 2 of 2, would be released in September.

"Drink You Away" was sent to country radio in the United States on November 23, 2015, as the fourth and final single from The 20/20 Experience – 2 of 2 (2013). Regarding the single release, Sony Music Nashville executive vice president, promotion/artist development Steve Hodges stated, "we received several requests from key programmers and we decided to get them a shortened version [of "Drink You Away"] so they didn't have to air the longer cut from the album," adding "our promotion staffs will not be actively working the single, we simply wanted to make the song easily accessible for country radio. Now they have it and can play it if they'd like" in an interview for Billboard.

== Composition ==
"Drink You Away"
A sample of "Drink You Away", a multi-genre song with pop and rock music influences. Throughout the chorus Timberlake makes references to several alcoholic beverages in the lines, "I can't drink you away. I've tried Jack, I've tried Jim...".

"Drink You Away" was written by Timberlake, Timothy "Timbaland" Mosley, Jerome "J-Roc" Harmon, and James Fauntleroy, and produced by Timbaland, Timberlake, and Harmon. It runs for a duration of five minutes and thirty-one seconds, while its radio edit lasts for four minutes and fifteen seconds. Chris Bosman of Time magazine described the track as a country-pop. On the other hand, Greg Kot of the Chicago Tribune thought that it was a gospel-blues song, while according to The A.V. Club's Annie Zaleski it is a classic-rock "homage". Kira Willis of Starpulse.com noted that "Drink You Away" is an "unabashed" Memphis soul song, "steeped in a gritty country riff." Its instrumentation includes organ and acoustic guitar; elements of pop and rock music can be heard in the song's guitar.

Lyrically, the song features references to several alcoholic drinks, which can be seen in the lyrics, "I can't drink you away. I've tried Jack, I've tried Jim... Now, tell me, baby, do they make a medicine for heartbreak?" Brad Stern of MTV News described it as a "plethora of alcohol references, and a whole lot of bluesy sorrow." According to Stacy-Ann Ellis of Vibe magazine, the song's lyrics continue the "druggy love analogy" which Timberlake started with some of the lyrical themes on The 20/20 Experience (2013) most particularly on, "Pusher Love Girl"; she noted that he is "trying to drown a bitter memory of her by opening up a bar tab and taking Tennessee whiskies to the head." Eric Henderson of Slant Magazine described "Drink You Away" as a "honky-tonking" song on which the singer compares his love to alcoholism.

== Critical reception ==
HitFix's Melinda Newman gave "Drink You Away" an A grade and called it "the best" and "the most captivating track" on The 20/20 Experience – 2 of 2, "with potential to be '2 of 2's'" "Mirrors". Similarly, Stern of MTV News thought that the song was one of the biggest surprises and one of the most impressive tracks on the album. Lewis Corner of Digital Spy labeled it as a "highlight" on the album and encouraged Timberlake to explore further the "Tennessee swagger" present on the track.

PopMatters' Brice Ezell called the song a "hat trick" on the album and also described it as one of its most "weirdest" and "successful" moments. According to him, the way Timberlake lists the beverages in the lyrics is an unorthodox style for the singer, and in addition, it differs musically from the rest of the material on the album; however, "for whatever reason, though, it works". He also noted that the song would suit better on a Montgomery Gentry LP. Kory Grow of Rolling Stone described it as a "a big genre-bending, feel-good sing-along that really actually does feels good." Jason King for Spin called the song "organ-laced" and thought it was "a surefire hit, a country twanger lifted to heaven by Timberlake's quilted, hermetic harmonies."

Ryan Dombal of Pitchfork thought that "his heartbrokenness falls flat" on the song which he further described as "plastic blues" and compared it to the works of the American country singer, Kid Rock. Variety's Andrew Barker described "Drink You Away" as one of the "lows" on the album and compared it to the music of Rock and Lynyrd Skynyrd. Stephen Carlick of Exclaim! concluded that the track, "relies too heavily on repetition".

== Commercial performance ==
Following Timberlake's performance at the Country Music Association Awards, the issue dated November 21, 2015, reported that the song sold 76,000 digital copies and reached number six on the US Hot Digital Songs chart. It has since peaked at number 5. For the chart dated February 6, 2016, the song debuted at number 60 on Billboard's Country Airplay chart and climbed 38–36 on the Mainstream Top 40 radio airplay chart. The single is his 26th entry on the latter as a solo artist. It has also peaked at number 17 on the US Hot R&B/Hip-Hop Songs chart. As of May 2016, it has sold 609,085 copies in the United States.

"Drink You Away" also peaked at number 85 on the Canadian Hot 100 chart. In South Korea, following the release of the parent album, the song sold 2,358 digital copies and peaked at number 96 on the Gaon Digital Chart.

== Live performances and covers ==
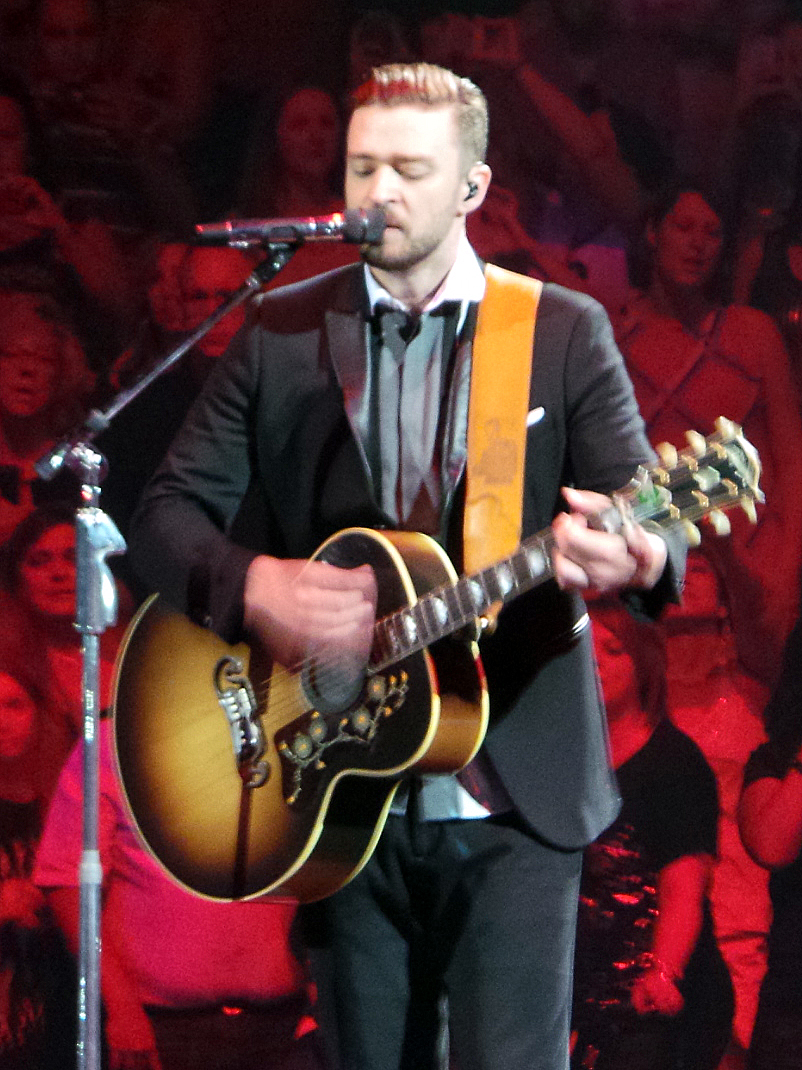
Timberlake performing "Drink You Away" during The 20/20 Experience World Tour

Timberlake performed "Drink You Away" for the first time at the 2013 American Music Awards held at the Nokia Theatre in Los Angeles; Rolling Stone's Grow ranked the performance at number five out of 16 performances that night. The song was part of the set lists of The 20/20 Experience World Tour (2013–2015) and The Man of the Woods Tour (2018–2019). Timberlake and Chris Stapleton performed the song together, along with the latter's "Tennessee Whiskey" at the Country Music Association Awards on November 4, 2015. Rolling Stone magazine praised it as "the best performance of the entire show", while The New York Times editor Katie Rogers highlighted Timberlake's crossover appeal. Entertainment Weekly declared it as one of the best performances of 2015 and wrote, "In an unapologetic display of talent, Nashville met Motown during country music's biggest night for a hands-in-the-air, take-us-to-church mash-up that was everything you hope for from an all-star duet."

American country music artist Craig Morgan has performed the song at several of his concerts. David Fanning's cover of "Drink You Away" peaked at number 58 on the Country Airplay chart.

== Credits and personnel ==
Credits are adapted from the liner notes of The 20/20 Experience – 2 of 2.

Locations

- Vocals recorded and mixed at Larrabee Studios, North Hollywood

Personnel

- Justin Timberlake — vocals, mixing, production, vocal production, vocal arrangement, guitar
- Timothy "Timbaland" Mosley — production
- Jerome "J-Roc" Harmon — keyboards, production
- Chris Godbey — engineering, mixing
- Jimmy Douglass — mixing
- Elliot Ives — guitar
- Alejandro Baima — additional mixing

== Charts ==
Chart performance
| Chart (2013–16) | Peak position |
|---|---|
| Canada Hot 100 (Billboard) | 85 |
| South Korea (Gaon Digital Chart) | 96 |
| US Bubbling Under Hot 100 (Billboard) | 9 |
| US Country Airplay (Billboard) | 60 |
| US Hot Digital Songs (Billboard) | 5 |
| US Hot R&B/Hip-Hop Songs (Billboard) | 17 |
| US Pop Airplay (Billboard) | 32 |

== Release history ==
Release dates and formats
| Country | Date | Format | Label | Ref. |
|---|---|---|---|---|
| United States | November 23, 2015 | Country radio | RCA Nashville | |
