= Know Bout Me =

Promotional single by Timbaland featuring Jay-Z, Drake and James Fauntleroy
- Released: November 21, 2013
- Recorded: 2013
- Genre: Hip-hop
- Length: 4:23
- Label: Mosley Music Group; Interscope
- Songwriters: Timothy Mosley; James Fauntleroy; Aubrey Graham; Shawn Carter; Jerome Harmon
- Producers: Timbaland; J-Roc

"Know Bout Me" is a promotional single by American producer Timbaland. The song features vocals from Jay-Z, Drake and James Fauntleroy. It was released as promotional single via digital download on November 21, 2013.

== Background ==
On November 15, 2013, Timbaland tweeted a link to "Know Bout Me" online, and it premiered on Power 106, the Los Angeles hip-hop radio station the same day. The song was later released as promotional single to the iTunes Store on November 21, 2013. A lyric video for the song was released on December 12, 2013.

== Charts ==
=== Weekly charts ===
Weekly chart performance for "Know Bout Me"
Chart (2013)	Peak position
Australia (ARIA)	24
Germany (Deutsche Black Charts)	20
US Bubbling Under R&B/Hip-Hop Singles (Billboard)	7
US Rhythmic Songs (Billboard)	40

=== Year-end charts ===
Year-end chart performance for "Know Bout Me"
Chart (2014)	Position
Germany (Deutsche Black Charts)	199

== Release history ==
Region	Date	Format	Label
United States	November 21, 2013	Digital download	Interscope Records
