= Gimme What I Don't Know (I Want) =

Song by Justin Timberlake

from the album The 20/20 Experience – 2 of 2
- Released: September 27, 2013
- Studio: Larrabee (North Hollywood)
- Genre: Electro-funk
- Length: 5:15
- Label: RCA
- Songwriters: Justin Timberlake; Timothy Mosley; Jerome "J-Roc" Harmon; James Fauntleroy
- Producers: Timbaland; Justin Timberlake; Jerome "J-Roc" Harmon

"Gimme What I Don't Know (I Want)" is a song by American singer Justin Timberlake from his fourth studio album, The 20/20 Experience – 2 of 2, released on September 27, 2013, by RCA Records. It is the opening track on the album and was written and produced by Timberlake, Timothy "Timbaland" Mosley and Jerome "J-Roc" Harmon, with additional writing from James Fauntleroy. Musically, it is an electro-funk song in which Timberlake urges his lover to "get closer to your animal inside".

After The 20/20 Experience – 2 of 2 was released, the track charted on the South Korean Gaon Chart at number sixty-nine. In reviews of The 20/20 Experience – 2 of 2, some music critics praised the song's sensually driven funkiness, while others criticized its extended outro and lyrical metaphors. Timberlake included "Gimme What I Don't Know (I Want)" on the set list of his 2013–2015 worldwide tour entitled The 20/20 Experience World Tour.

== Background and production ==
On March 16, 2013, record producer and drummer for the Roots, Questlove announced that Timberlake was planning to release a follow-up record to The 20/20 Experience in November. He referenced the album's 10-song track listing and title by saying, "10 songs now...10 songs later = 20 vision". Affirming Questlove's comments, the album's co-producer J-Roc revealed that it would consist of outtakes from the original album, as well as new material from upcoming studio sessions. Timberlake announced on May 5 that his fourth studio album, The 20/20 Experience – 2 of 2, would be released in September.

Timberlake wrote "Gimme What I Don't Know (I Want)" with Timothy "Timbaland" Mosley, J-Roc, and James Fauntleroy, and produced the track with Timbaland and J-Roc. Timberlake arranged and produced his vocals, which were recorded at Larrabee Studios in North Hollywood, California. Harmon provided keyboards, while Elliott Ives played guitar on the track. It was engineered by Chris Godbey, assisted by Alejandro Baima, and mixed by Jimmy Douglass with Godbey and Timberlake at Larrabee Studios.

== Composition ==
"Gimme What I Don't Know (I Want)"
A 30-second sample of the chorus to "Gimme What I Don't Know (I Want)".

"Gimme What I Don't Know (I Want)" is an electro-funk song with an approximate length of five minutes and fifteen seconds. Time magazine writer Chris Bosman cited the song as being an "extra-smooth" combination of the funk, pop and R&B genres that shifts "unexpectedly from memorable moment to memorable moment", while Mikael Wood of the Los Angeles Times described it as "cyborg-funk". 411Mania's Jeremy Thomas described the song as a "clear club hit" that oozes sensuality, while Paste magazine's Holly Gleason cited it as an "epic dance track". Jason King of Spin said that "Gimme What I Don't Know (I Want)", along with "TKO", "could be lost cuts from Timbaland's 2007 smash Shock Value" with its "sputtering buzz-saw synths" and "pneumatic drum programming". Bosman declared it to be a "classic Timberlake" song, although he felt that it is a "watered down" version of "Don't Hold the Wall", the third track on Timberlake's third studio album, The 20/20 Experience (2013).

"Gimme What I Don't Know (I Want)" opens with Timberlake singing about animalistic carnal desire, which Drowned in Sound writer Dave Hanratty noted to be a "note-perfect transition" from "Blue Ocean Floor", the closing track on The 20/20 Experience. The song then progresses into a more "nightclub-friendly environs" that fuses typical hip-hop beats with a "syncopated backbone" of acidic funk and a guitar groove that Bosman found to be reminiscent of a stripped-down version of Daft Punk's 2013 single "Get Lucky". Greg Kot of the Chicago Tribune said that Timberlake "turns into a one-man choir as he plays call-and-response lead vocals against a wordless background swirl".

Lyrically, Timberlake urges his lover "to get closer to your animal inside". Thomas wrote that the song's lyrics are not subtle, noting that Timberlake has "never been about subtlety".

== Reception ==
"Gimme What I Don't Know (I Want)" received mixed reviews from music critics. Andrew Barker of Variety magazine wrote that the track opens the album effectively while being its "most winningly silly sexual imagery". On the other side, In a review of The 20/20 Experience – 2 of 2, Mesfin Fekadu of The Huffington Post stated that the album starts on the wrong note by using "Gimme What I Don't Know (I Want)" as its opener. However, Melinda Newman of HitFix gave the song a grade A while describing it as a "sultry, sexy funky number" that introduces what is yet to come on the album.

Chris Bosman of Time magazine cited it as one of the album's best tracks. He, however, was critical of the song's extended outro, calling it an "awkward spoken word moment" that "slams the song's already obvious metaphor of the bedroom as jungle into the beaten ground." David Meller of MusicOMH wrote that "there's nothing particularly striking" about the song, but that it's "competent enough". Commercially, "Gimme What I Don't Know (I Want)" charted on the South Korea Gaon Chart at number sixty-nine.

== Live performances ==
Timberlake included "Gimme What I Don't Know (I Want)" on the set list of his 2013–15 worldwide tour entitled The 20/20 Experience World Tour.

== Credits and personnel ==
Credits are adapted from the liner notes of The 20/20 Experience – 2 of 2.

=== Locations ===
- Vocals recorded and mixed at Larrabee Studios, North Hollywood, California

=== Personnel ===
- Timothy "Timbaland" Mosley – producer, songwriter
- Justin Timberlake – mixer, producer, songwriter, vocal producer, vocal arranger
- Jerome "J-Roc" Harmon – keyboards, producer, songwriter
- James Fauntleroy – songwriter
- Chris Godbey – engineer, mixer
- Jimmy Douglass – mixer
- Alejandro Baima – assistant engineer
- Elliot Ives – guitar

== Charts ==
Chart performance for "Gimme What I Don't Know (I Want)"
| Chart (2013) | Peak position |
|---|---|
| South Korea (Gaon Chart) | 69 |
