= Not a Bad Thing =

Single by Justin Timberlake

from the album The 20/20 Experience – 2 of 2
- B-side: "TKO" (Black Friday remix)
- Released: February 24, 2014
- Studio: Larrabee (North Hollywood, California)
- Genre: Pop; blue-eyed soul
- Length: 11:28 (album version with "Pair of Wings"): 4:26 (radio edit/single version)
- Label: RCA
- Songwriters: Justin Timberlake; Timothy "Timbaland" Mosley; Jerome "J-Roc" Harmon; James Fauntleroy
- Producers: Timbaland; Justin Timberlake; Jerome "J-Roc" Harmon

Justin Timberlake singles chronology
"TKO" (2013)	"Not a Bad Thing" (2014)	"Love Never Felt So Good" (2014)

Music video
- "Not a Bad Thing" on YouTube

Audio sample
- file; help

"Not a Bad Thing" is a song by American singer Justin Timberlake from his fourth studio album, The 20/20 Experience – 2 of 2 (2013). It was released as the third single from the album on February 24, 2014, by RCA Records. It was written and produced by Timberlake, Timothy "Timbaland" Mosley, and Jerome "J-Roc" Harmon, with additional writing from James Fauntleroy. It is a mid-tempo pop ballad about love that uses an acoustic guitar throughout.

"Not a Bad Thing" received positive reviews from several contemporary music critics. Its music video premiered on The Ellen DeGeneres Show on March 20, 2014. It is a mini-documentary that follows two documentary filmmakers searching for a couple who got engaged on January 12, 2014, while heading to New York City on the Long Island Rail Road train, with the man proposing to his girlfriend to "Not a Bad Thing". The video concludes with the filmmakers being led to several false leads, with a second part of the video to follow. Timberlake performed it on The Tonight Show Starring Jimmy Fallon and during The 20/20 Experience World Tour. It reached number 8 on the US Billboard Hot 100 and topped the Mainstream Top 40.

== Production and composition ==
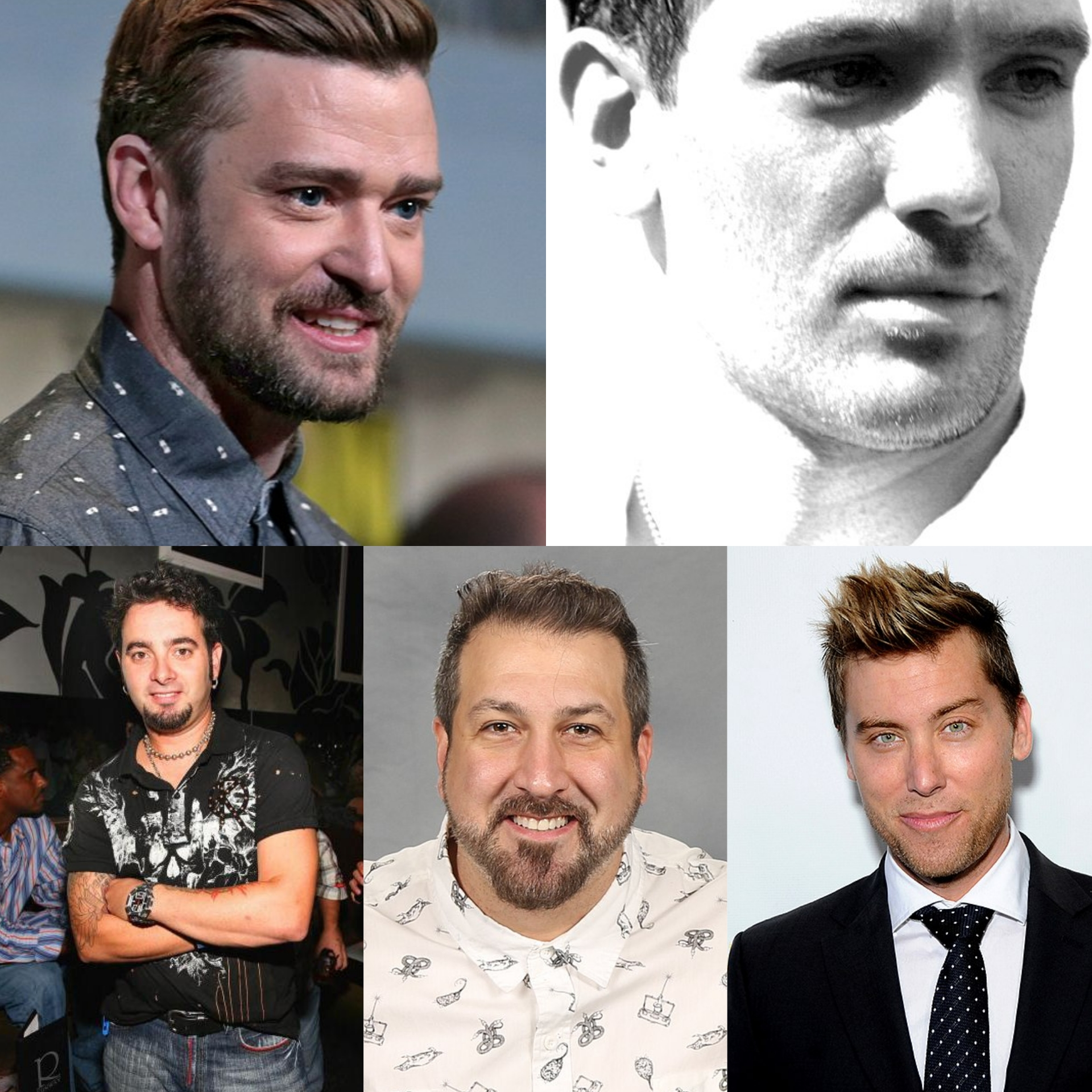
Brice Ezell of PopMatters compared "Not a Bad Thing" to NSYNC's 1999 song "(God Must Have Spent) A Little More Time on You" for sharing the same "emotional earnestness" and "heart-melter" characteristics.

On March 16, 2013, a day after The 20/20 Experience released, record producer and drummer for The Roots, Questlove announced that Timberlake was planning to release a follow-up record to The 20/20 Experience in November. He referenced the album's 10-song track listing and title by saying, "10 songs now...10 songs later = 20 vision." Affirming Questlove's comments, album co-producer J-Roc revealed that the follow-up will consist of outtakes from the original album, as well as new material from upcoming studio sessions. Timberlake announced on May 5 that his fourth album, The 20/20 Experience – 2 of 2, would be released in September.

"Not a Bad Thing" was written by Timberlake, Timothy "Timbaland" Mosley, Jerome "J-Roc" Harmon, and James Fauntleroy, and produced by Timbaland, Timberlake, and Harmon. It is a mid-tempo pop ballad, with a running duration of 11 minutes and 28 seconds; the album version includes a hidden track entitled "Pair of Wings". Critics noted its focus on the theme of love. PopMatters' Brice Ezell saw "Not a Bad Thing" to share the same characteristics as NSYNC's 1999 "(God Must Have Spent) A Little More Time on You", using the same "emotional earnestness" which made the latter song the "heart-melter" it was during its release. Mikael Wood of Los Angeles Times described it as a "dewy, blue-eyed soul number" that was realized when Timberlake was discovering the "emotional possibilities of his singing" during his time with the boy band. Holly Gleason of Paste interpreted the lyrics as endorsing love, with it contrasting the previous tracks on The 20/20 Experience – 2 of 2, celebrating the "happily ever after trope for all its worth".

== Release and promotion ==
RCA executives reportedly believed that "Not a Bad Thing" could be The 20/20 Experience – 2 of 2's largest commercial success. However, they instead opted to release "Take Back the Night" and "TKO" first, to represent the album's R&B sound and distinguish "Not a Bad Thing" from the sonically similar "Mirrors". A radio edit of it was digitally released on February 24, 2014, in Austria, France, Germany, Italy, Spain, Switzerland, the United Kingdom and the United States. The next day, it impacted the contemporary hit radio in the United States. On March 31, it was sent to US adult contemporary radio. The song was released as a CD single in Austria, Germany and Switzerland; apart from the radio edit of it, it also featured the Black Friday remix version of "TKO". The song impacted the mainstream radio in Italy on June 4.

Timberlake performed "Not a Bad Thing" on The Tonight Show Starring Jimmy Fallon on February 21, 2014. He also performed it during The 20/20 Experience and 2 of 2's supporting tour, The 20/20 Experience World Tour.

== Reception and commercial performance ==
"Not a Bad Thing" received general acclaim from critics. Jeremy Thomas of 411Mania selected it as one of the stand-out tracks from The 20/20 Experience – 2 of 2, using it as an example of a song from the album that "has a gentle side that can be appreciated," noting it as a "lovely close" to the album. Similarly, selecting it as a stand-out, Chris Bosman of Consequence saw it serving as the "pitch perfect" nostalgic track, pointing out its 'NSYNC influence. As well as depicting the latter influence, Melinda Newman of HitFix awarded it an A grade, labeling it as a "lovely, lilting straight-up pop tune." David Meller of MusicOMH described it as "arduous" due to its length and it having "any sort of edginess or intrigue." Along with several other songs within The 20/20 Experience – 2 of 2, Dave Hanratty of Drowned in Sound dismissed "Not a Bad Thing", writing that it contains "sun-kissed and forced smiles."

"Not a Bad Thing" reached the top 30 on the US Billboard Hot 100 in its fourth week on the chart, at number 27. In its fifth week, it rose to number 20, and in its sixth week, it again rose to number 14. It reached number 12 in its seventh week, before entering the top 10 at number 8 the following week. It sold 88,000 digital copies that week, with an audience impression of 79 million. It marked his 15th top ten hit on the Hot 100, while being the first and only top 10 single from The 20/20 Experience – 2 of 2. "Not a Bad Thing" has also achieved similar success on the US format charts, peaking at number 1 on the Mainstream Top 40, number 1 on the Adult Top 40 and at number 4 on the Rhythmic chart. On the Mainstream Top 40, Timberlake became the male artist with the most number-one songs and top 10 singles. Bruno Mars later tied with Timberlake for the most number-one singles among men when his Mark Ronson's collaboration "Uptown Funk" reached the top spot in early 2015. The tie was broken by Timberlake's "Can't Stop the Feeling!" in June 2016. As of 2018, it has sold 1.5 million downloads in the United States.

== Music video ==
A preview of its music video made its debut on The Ellen DeGeneres Show on March 20, 2014, before the full video premiered online later that day. Timberlake does not make an appearance in the video; the video involves two documentary filmmakers searching for a couple that got engaged on January 12, 2014, while heading to New York City on the Long Island Rail Road, with the man proposing to his girlfriend to "Not a Bad Thing". Throughout the music video, couples are interviewed, sharing their reflections on love, marriage, and their relationships, as well as their thoughts on the unknown couple. In conjunction, the documentarians are shown in the streets of New York City with flyers with the hashtag "#haveyouseenthiscouple," as well as stopping by for a radio interview and texting each other from borough to borough. The search produces several false leads, as they ask strangers and friends for help, with the video ending with a "To Be Continued" title. Following the video's premiere, Ellen DeGeneres explained that "Obviously, if you know this couple, contact us, because Justin is trying to find you and we'll put you all together."

A second video documenting several love stories that fans submitted on Twitter under the hashtag #NotABadLoveStory, collecting photos and videos, was shared on Timberlake's Vevo channel on YouTube.

== Personnel ==
Credits were adapted from the liner notes of The 20/20 Experience – 2 of 2.

Locations

- Vocals recorded and mixed at Larrabee Studios, North Hollywood, California

Personnel

- Timothy "Timbaland" Mosley – producer, songwriter
- Justin Timberlake – Mixer, producer, songwriter, vocal producer, vocal arranger, guitar
- Jerome "J-Roc" Harmon – keyboards, producer, songwriter
- James Fauntleroy – songwriter
- Chris Godbey – engineer, mixer
- Jimmy Douglass – mixer
- Alejandro Baima – assistant mixer
- Elliot Ives – guitar

== Charts ==
=== Weekly charts ===
Chart (2014)	Peak position
Australia (ARIA)	10
Australia Urban (ARIA)	1
Austria (Ö3 Austria Top 40)	69
Belgium (Ultratip Bubbling Under Flanders)	4
Belgium Urban (Ultratop Flanders)	20
Belgium (Ultratip Bubbling Under Wallonia)	32
Canada Hot 100 (Billboard)	9
Canada AC (Billboard)	15
Canada CHR/Top 40 (Billboard)	2
Canada Hot AC (Billboard)	2
Czech Republic Airplay (ČNS IFPI)	15
Czech Republic Singles Digital (ČNS IFPI)	27
Denmark (Tracklisten)	16
Germany (GfK)	62
Iceland (RÚV)	14
Ireland (IRMA)	38
Lebanon (The Official Lebanese Top 20)	19
Netherlands (Dutch Top 40)	28
Netherlands (Single Top 100)	46
New Zealand (Recorded Music NZ)	5
Scottish Singles Sales (Official Charts)	31
Slovakia Airplay (ČNS IFPI)	34
Slovakia Singles Digital (ČNS IFPI)	62
South Korea (Gaon Digital Chart)	25
South Korea (Gaon Download Chart)	22
Switzerland (Schweizer Hitparade)	29
UK Singles (Official Charts)	21
UK Airplay (Music Week)	26
UK Hip Hop/R&B (Official Charts)	5
US Billboard Hot 100	8
US Adult Contemporary (Billboard)	8
US Adult Pop Airplay (Billboard)	1
US Dance Airplay (Billboard)	23
US Pop Airplay (Billboard)	1
US Rhythmic Airplay (Billboard)	4

=== Monthly charts ===
Chart (2014)	Peak position
South Korea (Gaon Download Chart)	63

=== Year-end charts ===
Chart (2014)	Position
Australia (ARIA)	98
Canada (Canadian Hot 100)	45
New Zealand (Recorded Music NZ)	44
US Billboard Hot 100	45
US Adult Contemporary (Billboard)	16
US Adult Top 40 (Billboard)	20
US Mainstream Top 40 (Billboard)	20
US Rhythmic Songs (Billboard)	33

== Certifications ==
Region	Certification	Certified units/sales
Australia (ARIA)	Platinum	70,000^{^}
Brazil (Pro-Música Brasil)	Gold	30,000^{‡}
Denmark (IFPI Danmark)	Gold	1,300,000^{†}
New Zealand (RMNZ)	Platinum	15,000^{*}
United Kingdom (BPI)	Silver	200,000^{‡}
United States (RIAA)	Platinum	1,500,000
^{*} Sales figures based on certification alone.^{^} Shipments figures based on certification alone.^{‡} Sales+streaming figures based on certification alone.^{†} Streaming-only figures based on certification alone.

== Release history ==
Country	Date	Format	Label	Ref.
Austria	February 24, 2014	Digital download	Sony	
France	February 24, 2014	Digital download	Sony	
Germany	February 24, 2014	Digital download	Sony	
Italy	February 24, 2014	Digital download	Sony	
Spain	February 24, 2014	Digital download	Sony	
Switzerland	February 24, 2014	Digital download	Sony	
United Kingdom	February 24, 2014	Digital download	RCA	
United States	February 24, 2014	Digital download	RCA	
United States	February 25, 2014	Contemporary hit radio	RCA	
United States	March 31, 2014	Hot/Modern/AC radio	RCA	
Austria	April 18, 2014	CD single	Sony	
Germany	April 18, 2014	CD single	Sony	
Switzerland	April 18, 2014	CD single	Sony	
United States	May 27, 2014	AC radio	RCA	
Italy	June 4, 2014	Mainstream radio	Sony	

== See also ==
- List of Billboard Hot 100 top 10 singles in 2014
- List of Mainstream Top 40 number-one hits of 2014 (U.S.)
