= The 20/20 Experience – 2 of 2 =

2013 album by Justin Timberlake

- Standard edition cover

Studio album by Justin Timberlake
- Released: September 27, 2013
- Recorded: May–July 2012
- Studios: Jungle City (New York City); Larrabee (North Hollywood)
- Genres: R&B; pop; funk
- Length: 74:25
- Label: RCA
- Producers: Jerome "J-Roc" Harmon; Daniel Jones; Rob Knox; Timbaland; Justin Timberlake

Justin Timberlake chronology
The 20/20 Experience (2013)	The 20/20 Experience – 2 of 2 (2013)	The 20/20 Experience – The Complete Experience (2013)

Alternative cover
- Deluxe edition cover

Singles from The 20/20 Experience – 2 of 2
- 1. "Take Back the Night" Released: July 12, 2013; 2. "TKO" Released: September 20, 2013; 3. "Not a Bad Thing" Released: February 24, 2014; 4. "Drink You Away" Released: November 23, 2015

The 20/20 Experience – 2 of 2 is the fourth studio album by American singer Justin Timberlake, released on September 27, 2013, by RCA Records. It is considered the second half of a two-part project, following The 20/20 Experience (2013), his third album. Production was handled by Timbaland, Timberlake, and Jerome "J-Roc" Harmon, with Rob Knox contributing to the album's deluxe edition and Daniel Jones providing additional production on "Cabaret". It was supported by four singles: "Take Back the Night", "TKO", "Not a Bad Thing", and "Drink You Away".

Upon release, The 20/20 Experience – 2 of 2 received mixed reviews from music critics. "Not a Bad Thing" charted in the top ten of the US Billboard Hot 100 and topped the Mainstream Top 40 airplay chart. "Drink You Away" reached country radio in November 2015 after being performed at the Country Music Association Awards. Coinciding with the release of The 20/20 Experience – 2 of 2, the record was packaged with The 20/20 Experience and released as a compilation album titled The 20/20 Experience – The Complete Experience, which was nominated for a Grammy Award in the category Best Pop Vocal Album.

== Background ==
In September 2006, Timberlake released his second album, FutureSex/LoveSounds, which was critically and commercially acclaimed and spawned six singles, including the worldwide hits "SexyBack", "My Love", and "What Goes Around... Comes Around". After wrapping up a worldwide concert tour to support the album in 2007, Timberlake took a break from his music career to focus on acting. In addition, Timberlake worked behind-the-scenes with his record label Tennman Records (founded in 2007) and his production team The Y's (founded in 2008). He also provided guest vocals on several singles by other artists, such as "4 Minutes" by Madonna and "Carry Out" by Timbaland. In 2010, Timberlake's manager, Johnny Wright, began conversations with the singer about working on new music. The two had general decisions about ways to release new music, because according to Wright, "a lot of the physical record sellers were gone, by the time we've got music again we need to think about different ways to deliver it".

Wright proposed a promotion based on an application or releasing a new song every month. Timberlake, however, was not interested in returning to music; instead, he continued to focus on his film career. Around the "late part of May, first week in June" 2012, Timberlake invited Wright to dinner and revealed that he had spent the last couple of nights in the studio with Timbaland working on new material. Wright was shocked at the revelation, telling Billboard magazine that he "wasn't prepared for that." The two immediately began marketing plans for how the album should be promoted and when it should be released. Ultimately, they agreed "to do this in a shorter period of time, so let's put the single out and [release the album] seven or eight weeks after that—make it a short window, and because we have such a short window, we have to make a big impact."

== Release ==
On March 16, 2013, a day after The 20/20 Experience released, record producer and drummer for The Roots, Questlove announced that Timberlake was planning to release a follow-up record to The 20/20 Experience in November. He referenced the album's 10-song track listing and title by saying, "10 songs now...10 songs later = 20 vision." Affirming Questlove's comments, album co-producer J-Roc revealed that the follow-up will consist of outtakes from the original album, as well as new material from upcoming studio sessions. Timberlake announced on May 5 that his fourth album, The 20/20 Experience – 2 of 2, would be released in September.

The 20/20 Experience – 2 of 2 was made available for pre-order on the iTunes Store on July 12, 2013. The record included eleven tracks, in addition to an unannounced "special surprise". Timberlake began announcing the album's track listing through a series of Instagram videos on August 14, 2013. On August 27, 2013, Timberlake revealed that frequent collaborator Jay-Z would be on the song "Murder", and rapper Drake would be on the song "Cabaret". On September 24, 2013, the album was released for free streaming on iTunes in its entirety.

== Promotion ==
=== Singles ===
"Take Back the Night" was released as the album's lead single on July 12, 2013, after being teased in a video two days before. It was made available for digital download on the iTunes Store along with the album's pre-order. The music video for "Take Back the Night" was shot on July 18, 2013, in New York City and released on July 30, 2013. It was directed by Jeff Nicholas, Jonathan Craven and Darren Craig; the first two previously directed the music video for "Tunnel Vision" from The 20/20 Experience (2013). Commercially, it was a moderate success and managed to reach the top 40 positions in eight countries. It reached number 29 on the US Billboard Hot 100, and number 22 on the UK Singles Chart.

"TKO" was released as the second single from the album on September 20, 2013. The music video was released on October 29, 2013. It was directed by Ryan Reichenfeld, and Timberlake's love interest in the video is played by Riley Keough. The single reached number 37 on the US Billboard Hot 100, and number 58 on the UK Singles Chart. "Not a Bad Thing" was released to radio as the third official single from the album on February 25, 2014; the album version has an included hidden track entitled "Pair of Wings". The song peaked at number 8 on the Billboard Hot 100 and topped the Mainstream Top 40. "Drink You Away" was released to country radio on November 23, 2015, following a positive reception of Timberlake's performance of the song at the 2015 Country Music Association Awards with Chris Stapleton.

=== Tour ===
To promote The 20/20 Experience and 2 of 2, Timberlake announced on May 5, 2013, that he would embark on The 20/20 Experience World Tour, his second global concert tour. Promoted primarily by AEG Live, the tour started on October 31, 2013, in Montreal, just two months after the Legends of the Summer tour concluded. Twenty-two additional dates were announced across Canada and the United States, ending on February 16, 2014, in Chicago, Illinois. Timberlake's official website noted that additional dates in Europe, South America, and Australia would follow.

== Critical reception ==
Professional ratings
Aggregate scores
Source	Rating
AnyDecentMusic?	5.8/10
Metacritic	60/100
Review scores
Source	Rating
AllMusic	2/5 stars
The A.V. Club	B+
Chicago Tribune	2.5/4 stars
Entertainment Weekly	B
The Guardian	3/5 stars
Los Angeles Times	3/4 stars
NME	4/10
Pitchfork	4.5/10
Rolling Stone	3.5/5 stars
Spin	6/10

The 20/20 Experience – 2 of 2 received mixed reviews from music critics. At Metacritic, which assigns a normalized rating out of 100 to reviews from mainstream critics, the album received an average score of 60, based on 27 reviews, indicating "mixed or average reviews". The review aggregator AnyDecentMusic? gave the album a weighted average score of 5.8 out of 10 based on 22 critic scores.

In his review for the Chicago Tribune, Greg Kot wrote that it could have been a neat album of clever pop music had it been edited down. Kyle Anderson of Entertainment Weekly felt that the songs are too long and excessively unfocused, particularly "Only When I Walk Away". Stephen Carlick of Exclaim! said that it is less consistent than its predecessor, even though there are some successful pop songs. Pitchfork's Ryan Dombal found Timberlake's pick up lines unpleasant and angst disingenuous, and accompanied by recycled production. Spin magazine's Jason King said that the album is somewhat disappointing because it lacks anything as immediate as "Let the Groove Get In" or as vibrant as "Pusher Love Girl" from Timberlake's previous album. Andy Gill of The Independent deemed 2 of 2 inferior to The 20/20 Experience when using outtakes from the sessions for the latter, calling the reduction in quality "a pretty steep fall". Al Horner of NME said that the overlong songs pass tediously as "pieces from the cutting-room floor cobbled together on the cheap".

In a positive review, Brice Ezell of PopMatters viewed the album as an improvement over its predecessor because the songs have more compelling pop structures. Annie Zaleski of The A.V. Club said that it benefited from Timberlake's additional time in the studio: "Timberlake reined in his musical vision just enough to make this album more focused and engaging—but didn't lose sight of his desire to take chances." Slant Magazine's Eric Henderson found it more believable than the first 20/20 album because of how "its subject matter goes further into the disquieting root of what it means to be obsessed with a celebrity (Jackson) who was himself already intensely obsessed with his own persona." Holly Gleason of Paste described it as "sexually frank and utterly willing", and noted that it "takes grooves deeper, lyrics freakier, the format hotter". Jim Farber of the New York Daily News noted that while the eleven songs "have their merits and charms, in nearly every case they fall in the shadow of the initial twelve". Sarah Rodman of The Boston Globe noted that while Timberlake "still goes on a bit long in places", he "nails a more cohesive vibe".

== Commercial performance ==
The album debuted at number one on the US Billboard 200 chart, with first-week sales of 350,000 copies in the United States, giving Timberlake his second number-one album of the year and third overall in the US. In its second week the album sold 70,000 more copies, bringing its total album sales to 420,000. On the UK Albums Chart, it opened at number two behind Haim's album Days Are Gone, breaking Timberlake's streak of UK number one albums. In November 2013, The 20/20 Experience – 2 of 2 was certified platinum by the Recording Industry Association of America (RIAA) for sales of over 1,000,000 units in the US, giving Timberlake his fourth consecutive platinum album. In 2013, The 20/20 Experience – 2 of 2 was ranked as the 40th most popular album of the year on the Billboard 200. The following year, The 20/20 Experience – 2 of 2 was ranked as the 32nd most popular album of 2014 on the Billboard 200. As of June 18, 2014, The 20/20 Experience – 2 of 2 has sold over 1,137,000 copies in the United States, bringing its total to over 1,637,000 copies sold worldwide.

== Track listing ==
All tracks are written by Justin Timberlake, Timothy "Timbaland" Mosley, Jerome Harmon, and James Fauntleroy and produced by Timbaland, Timberlake, and J-Roc, except where noted. Timberlake also serves as a vocal producer on all tracks and is credited as "JT" for the latter role.

Standard edition
No.	Title	Length
1.	"Gimme What I Don't Know (I Want)"	5:15
2.	"True Blood" (writers: Timberlake, Mosley, and Harmon)	9:31
3.	"Cabaret" (featuring Drake) (additional writers: Aubrey Graham and Daniel Jones; additional producer Jones^{[b]})	4:32
4.	"TKO" (additional writer: Barry White)	7:04
5.	"Take Back the Night"	5:53
6.	"Murder" (featuring Jay-Z) (additional writer: Shawn Carter)	5:07
7.	"Drink You Away"	5:31
8.	"You Got It On"	5:55
9.	"Amnesia" (additional writer and producer: Jones^{[c]})	7:04
10.	"Only When I Walk Away" (additional writer: Amedeo Minghi)	7:05
11.	"Not a Bad Thing" / "Pair of Wings^{[d]}" (hidden track)	11:28
Total length:		1:14:25

Deluxe edition
No.	Title	Length
12.	"Blindness" (writers: Timberlake, Robin Tadross, and Fauntleroy; producers: Rob Knox and Timberlake)	4:48
13.	"Electric Lady"	4:20
Total length:		1:23:33

=== Notes ===
- ^{^[b]} additional producer
- ^{^[c]}vocal producer
- ^{^[d]} "Pair of Wings" is a hidden track on CD and digital versions of the album. It starts approximately five minutes and 28 seconds (5:28) into "Not a Bad Thing".
- "TKO" contains a sample from "Somebody's Gonna Off the Man", written and performed by Barry White.
- "Only When I Walk Away" contains a sample from "Lustful", written and performed by Amedeo Minghi. The track also features additional vocals by Brenda Radney and James Fauntleroy.

== Credits and personnel ==
Credits are adapted from the album's liner notes.

Primary musicians and producers

- Justin Timberlake – vocals (all tracks), guitar ("Drink You Away", "Not a Bad Thing", "Pair of Wings" and "Blindness"), keyboards ("True Blood", "You Got It On" and "Blindness"), production (all tracks), mixing
- J-Roc – keyboards (all tracks except "Pair of Wings"), bass ("Pair of Wings"), production (all tracks except "Pair of Wings" and "Blindness")
- Elliott Ives – guitar (all tracks except "Electric Lady")
- Timbaland – production (all tracks except "Pair of Wings" and "Blindness")
- Rob Knox – production ("Blindness")
- Chris Godbey – engineering (all tracks), mixing
- Reggie Dozier – strings engineering ("Take Back the Night", "You Got It On", "Amnesia" and "Pair of Wings"), horns engineering ("Take Back the Night")
- Jimmy Douglass – mixing

Additional contributors

- The Benjamin Wright Orchestra – strings ("True Blood", "Take Back the Night", "You Got It On", "Amnesia", "Pair of Wings" and "Blindness"), horns ("Take Back the Night")
- Terry Santiel – percussion ("True Blood", "Take Back the Night" and "You Got It On")
- Daniel Jones – keyboards ("Cabaret", "Take Back the Night" and "Amnesia"), additional production ("Cabaret" and "Amnesia")
- Brenda Radney – additional vocals ("Only When I Walk Away")
- James Fauntleroy – additional vocals ("Only When I Walk Away")
- Alejandro Baima – mixing assistance ("Gimme What I Don't Know (I Want)", "True Blood", "TKO", "Murder", "Drink You Away", "Only When I Walk Away" and "Not a Bad Thing")
- Matt Webber – mixing assistance ("Cabaret", "Take Back the Night", "You Got It On" and "Amnesia")

== Charts ==
=== Weekly charts ===
Weekly chart performance
Chart (2013)	Peak position
Australian Albums (ARIA)	4
Austrian Albums (Ö3 Austria)	8
Belgian Albums (Ultratop Flanders)	5
Belgian Albums (Ultratop Wallonia)	15
Canadian Albums (Billboard)	1
Croatian Albums (Toplista)	26
Danish Albums (Hitlisten)	2
Dutch Albums (Album Top 100)	4
Finnish Albums (Suomen virallinen lista)	21
French Albums (SNEP)	12
German Albums (Offizielle Top 100)	4
Hungarian Albums (MAHASZ)	26
Irish Albums (IRMA)	3
Japanese Albums (Oricon)	19
New Zealand Albums (RMNZ)	3
Norwegian Albums (VG-lista)	2
Polish Albums (ZPAV)	14
Portuguese Albums (AFP)	9
Scottish Albums (Official Charts)	5
Spanish Albums (Promusicae)	22
Swedish Albums (Sverigetopplistan)	8
Swiss Albums (Schweizer Hitparade)	2
UK Albums (Official Charts)	2
UK R&B Albums (Official Charts)	1
US Billboard 200	1
US Top R&B/Hip-Hop Albums (Billboard)	1

=== Year-end charts ===
Year-end chart performance
Chart (2013)	Position
Belgian Albums (Ultratop Flanders)	95
Belgian Albums (Ultratop Wallonia)	200
Canadian Albums (Billboard)	44
UK Albums (OCC)	139
US Billboard 200	40
US Top R&B/Hip-Hop Albums (Billboard)	13

=== Decade-end charts ===
Decade-end chart performance
Chart (2010–2019)	Position
US Billboard 200	156

== Certifications ==
Certifications and sales
Region	Certification	Certified units/sales
Brazil (Pro-Música Brasil)	Diamond	160,000^{‡}
Canada (Music Canada)	Platinum	80,000^{^}
Mexico (AMPROFON)	3× Platinum+Gold	210,000^{‡}
New Zealand (RMNZ)	Gold	7,500^{‡}
Portugal (AFP)	Gold	7,500^{^}
United Kingdom (BPI)	Gold	100,000^{‡}
United States (RIAA)	Platinum	1,137,000
^{^} Shipments figures based on certification alone.^{‡} Sales+streaming figures based on certification alone.

== Release history ==
Release dates
Country	Date	Edition	Format	Label	Ref.
Australia	September 27, 2013	Deluxe	CD	Sony	
Germany	September 27, 2013	Standard	CD; LP	Sony	
Germany	September 27, 2013	Deluxe	CD	Sony	
Canada	September 30, 2013	Standard	LP	Sony	
Canada	September 30, 2013	Deluxe	CD	Sony	
France	September 30, 2013	Standard	CD; LP	Sony	
France	September 30, 2013	Deluxe	CD	Sony	
United Kingdom	September 30, 2013	Standard	CD; LP	RCA	
United Kingdom	September 30, 2013	Deluxe	CD	RCA	
United States	September 30, 2013	Standard	CD; LP	RCA	
United States	September 30, 2013	Deluxe	CD; LP	RCA	
Italy	October 1, 2013	Standard	CD	Sony	
Italy	October 1, 2013	Deluxe	CD	Sony	
Poland	October 1, 2013	Standard	CD; LP	Sony	
Asia	October 9, 2013	Limited	CD	Sony	

== The 20/20 Experience – The Complete Experience ==
The 20/20 Experience – The Complete Experience

Compilation album by Justin Timberlake
- Released: September 27, 2013
- Recorded: May–July 2012
- Length: 144:36
- Label: RCA
- Producers: Jerome "J-Roc" Harmon; Daniel Jones; The Tennessee Kids; Timbaland; Justin Timberlake

Justin Timberlake chronology
The 20/20 Experience – 2 of 2 (2013)	The 20/20 Experience – The Complete Experience (2013)	Man of the Woods (2018)

The 20/20 Experience – The Complete Experience is a compilation album comprising The 20/20 Experience and The 20/20 Experience – 2 of 2. RCA Records released it on September 27, 2013. The bonus tracks "Dress On", "Body Count", "Blindness", and "Electric Lady" are excluded from this release. The Complete Experience was nominated for Best Pop Vocal Album at the 56th Annual Grammy Awards.

=== Charts ===
Chart performance
Chart (2013–14)	Peak position
Australian Albums (ARIA)	46
Belgian Albums (Ultratop Flanders)	36
Belgian Albums (Ultratop Wallonia)	77
Chinese Albums (Sino Chart)	7
Danish Albums (Hitlisten)	7
Dutch Albums (Album Top 100)	30
New Zealand Albums (RMNZ)	22
South Korean Albums (Circle)	32
Scottish Albums (Official Charts)	56
Spanish Albums (Promusicae)	44
UK Albums (Official Charts)	27
UK R&B Albums (Official Charts)	4

=== Certifications ===
Certifications
Region	Certification	Certified units/sales
Australia (ARIA)	Gold	35,000^{^}
United Kingdom (BPI)	Silver	60,000^{‡}
United States	—	1,100,000
^{^} Shipments figures based on certification alone.^{‡} Sales+streaming figures based on certification alone.
