= TKO (song) =

Single by Justin Timberlake

from the album The 20/20 Experience – 2 of 2
- A-side: "Not a Bad Thing"
- Released: September 20, 2013
- Recorded: May–July 2012
- Studio: Larrabee (North Hollywood)
- Genre: Pop; R&B
- Length: 7:04 (album version); 4:49 (radio edit 1); 4:32 (radio edit 2)
- Label: RCA
- Songwriters: Justin Timberlake; Timothy Mosley; Jerome "J-Roc" Harmon; James Fauntleroy; Barry White
- Producers: Timbaland; Justin Timberlake; Jerome "J-Roc" Harmon

Justin Timberlake singles chronology
"Take Back the Night" (2013)	"TKO" (2013)	"Not a Bad Thing" (2014)

"TKO" is a song by American singer Justin Timberlake from his fourth studio album, The 20/20 Experience – 2 of 2 (2013). It was written and produced by Timberlake, Timothy "Timbaland" Mosley and Jerome "J-Roc" Harmon, with additional writing from James Fauntleroy and a sample of Barry White's "Somebody's Gonna Off the Man". A remix by rappers J. Cole, ASAP Rocky, and Pusha T, subtitled the "Black Friday Remix", was also released. Lyrically, it uses boxing metaphors to describe the feeling of seeing a former lover with someone else.

RCA Records released "TKO" on September 20, 2013, as the second single from The 20/20 Experience – 2 of 2. It received mixed reviews from music critics and entered the top 40 on the US Billboard Hot 100, where it reached number thirty-six. The song was eventually certified platinum by Pro-Música Brasil (PMB) and gold by Music Canada and Grammofonleverantörernas förening (GLF). The accompanying music video, directed by Ryan Reichenfeld, was released on October 29, 2013, and stars Elvis Presley's granddaughter Riley Keough as Timberlake's love interest.

== Background and composition ==
On March 16, 2013, a day after The 20/20 Experience released, record producer and drummer for The Roots, Questlove announced that Timberlake was planning to release a follow-up record to The 20/20 Experience in November. He referenced the album's 10-song track listing and title by saying, "10 songs now...10 songs later = 20 vision." Affirming Questlove's comments, album co-producer J-Roc revealed that the follow-up will consist of outtakes from the original album, as well as new material from upcoming studio sessions. Timberlake announced on May 5 that his fourth album, The 20/20 Experience – 2 of 2, would be released in September.

"TKO" was written by Timberlake, Timothy "Timbaland" Mosley, Jerome "J-Roc" Harmon, and James Fauntleroy, and was produced by Timbaland, Timberlake, and Harmon. It features heavy drums and "scratchy" studio effects, which, according to a staff writer for Consequence, are reminiscent of a "slightly more refined Justified." Jocelyn Vena of MTV News described the production as having "signature bleepy production" and "dark undertones". Lyrically, "TKO" leans heavily on boxing metaphors, with the title "TKO", short for technical knockout, to describe the feeling of seeing a former lover with someone else. The theme continues with lines like "I'm out for the count, yeah girl you knock me out."

== Release and promotion ==
According to RCA Records, the label perceived much more hit potential in "Not a Bad Thing" (2014); however, they decided to release "Take Back the Night" (2013) and "TKO" as pre-album singles, as they felt it best represented the album's R&B side. Released a year after the just-as-pop-heavy "Mirrors" (2013), "Not A Bad Thing" became a top-ten hit.

After releasing "Take Back the Night" as the first single from The 20/20 Experience – 2 of 2, Timberlake faced controversy for its title, due to the similarities between the song's title and the anti-rape organization of the same name. After that, on September 19, 2013, the singer teased his fans with an Instagram post, saying, "Should I release a new single today???." Later, he posted another photo, saying, "Get Ready...", attached to a photo of him in the studio recording a song. Five hours later, Timberlake posted a tease of the track with a 15-second snippet. To finish the teasing, the singer posted the single's cover art, saying, "You ready to hear it in full???," also revealing its title: "TKO". On September 20, 2013, the single was released.

A remix of "TKO", subtitled the "Black Friday Remix", premiered on November 29, 2013. It features new rap verses from J. Cole, ASAP Rocky and Pusha T. Timberlake included "TKO" on the set list of his fifth worldwide tour entitled The 20/20 Experience World Tour (2013–2015).

== Reception ==
Upon release, "TKO" garnered mixed reviews from critics. Supporters appreciated the presence of the "unique Timberlake charm" and Timbaland style of R&B production. Underwhelmed and disappointed reviewers, such as Annie Zaleski, criticized the monotony and a lack of evolution in Timbaland's production, and the usage of "tired" and "predictable" boxing cliches in the lyrics. Tom Breihan of Stereogum was let down by the absence of Timberlake's "old-school loverman slickness" on The 20/20 Experience, and that "the melody doesn't quite stick the way you'd hope a Timberlake melody would." Pitchfork and Consequence of Sound cringed at Timbaland's "baby talk" in the intro, "She kill me with the coo coochie coochie coo".

In North America, "TKO" peaked at number thirty-six on the US Billboard Hot 100 and number nine on the US Hot R&B/Hip-Hop Songs chart. In terms of airplay, it peaked at number thirty-six on Adult Pop Airplay, number twelve on Pop Airplay, and number ten on Rhythmic Airplay. It peaked at number twenty-eight on the Canadian Hot 100. On its component airplay charts, it peaked at number ten on Canada CHR/Top 40 and number thirty-four on Canada Hot AC. It was certified platinum by Music Canada. In South America, the song was certified platinum by Pro-Música Brasil (PMB).

In Europe, "TKO" peaked at numbers five and thirteen on the bubbling under charts in the Flanders and Wallonia regions of Belgium, but peaked at number twenty-three on the former's urban chart. It also peaked at number four in Bulgaria, number one hundred sixty-three in France, number seventy-one in Germany, number fifty-one on the Irish Singles Chart, number thirteen in the Netherlands, number sixty-eight in Switzerland, number fifty-eight on the UK Singles Chart, and number fifteen on the UK Hip Hop and R&B Singles Chart. It was certified gold by Grammofonleverantörernas förening (GLF).

In Asia, "TKO" peaked at number thirteen in Lebanon and numbers one hundred fifty-five and five on Gaon Chart's digital and international charts in South Korea. In Oceania, the song peaked at number twenty-four on the urban chart in Australia.

== Music video ==
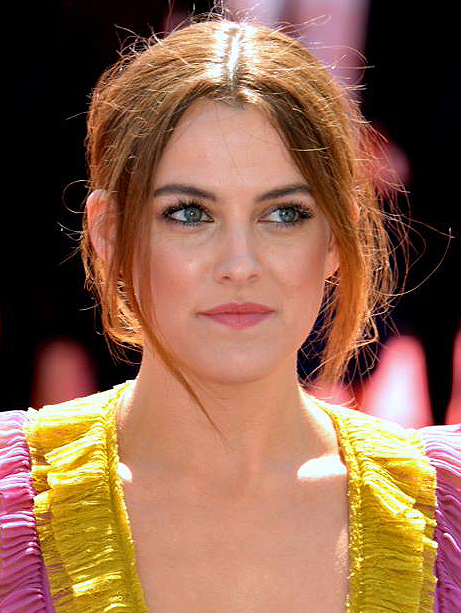
American actress and model Riley Keough (pictured) is Timberlake's love interest in the video.

A music video for the song, directed by Ryan Reichenfeld, was released on October 29, 2013. Timberlake's love interest in the video is played by Elvis Presley's granddaughter Riley Keough, with the video lasting for 7 minutes. In one scene, Keough delivers a cast-iron skillet to Timberlake's cranium. Through it all, Timberlake keeps his chin up and continues to sing even while being dragged to his death. Upon its release, Billboard called the video "a knock-down, drag-out good time", while Melinda Newman of HitFix panned it as a cartoonish, "misguided look at domestic violence", comparing it to the video of Eminem's "Love the Way You Lie".

== Credits and personnel ==
Credits are adapted from the liner notes of The 20/20 Experience – 2 of 2.

=== Locations ===
- Vocals recorded and mixed at Larrabee Studios, North Hollywood, California

=== Personnel ===
- Timothy "Timbaland" Mosley – producer, songwriter
- Justin Timberlake – Mixer, producer, songwriter, vocal producer, vocal arranger
- Jerome "J-Roc" Harmon – keyboards, producer, songwriter
- James Fauntleroy – songwriter
- Barry White – songwriter
- Chris Godbey – engineer, mixer
- Jimmy Douglass – mixer
- Alejandro Baima – assistant engineer
- Elliot Ives – guitar

== Charts ==
=== Weekly charts ===
Weekly chart performance
Chart (2013–2014)	Peak position
Australian Urban (ARIA)	24
Belgium (Ultratip Bubbling Under Flanders)	5
Belgium Urban (Ultratop Flanders)	23
Belgium (Ultratip Bubbling Under Wallonia)	13
Bulgaria Airplay (BAMP)	4
Canada Hot 100 (Billboard)	28
Canada CHR/Top 40 (Billboard)	10
Canada Hot AC (Billboard)	34
France (SNEP)	163
Germany (GfK)	71
Ireland (IRMA)	51
Lebanon (The Official Lebanese Top 20)	13
Netherlands (Dutch Tipparade 40)	13
South Korea (Gaon Chart)	155
South Korea (Gaon International Chart)	5
Switzerland (Schweizer Hitparade)	68
UK Singles (Official Charts)	58
UK Hip Hop/R&B (Official Charts)	15
US Billboard Hot 100	36
US Hot R&B/Hip-Hop Songs (Billboard)	9
US Adult Pop Airplay (Billboard)	36
US Pop Airplay (Billboard)	12
US Rhythmic Airplay (Billboard)	10

=== Monthly charts ===
Monthly chart performance
Chart (2013)	Peak position
South Korea (Gaon International Chart)	52

=== Year-end charts ===
Year-end chart performance
Chart (2013)	Position
Belgium (Ultratop Flanders Urban)	99
US Hot R&B/Hip-Hop Songs (Billboard)	74
US Mainstream Top 40 (Billboard)	88

Chart (2014)	Position
US Hot R&B/Hip-Hop Songs (Billboard)	74

== Certifications ==
Certifications
Region	Certification	Certified units/sales
Brazil (Pro-Música Brasil)	Platinum	60,000^{‡}
Canada (Music Canada)	Gold	40,000^{*}
Sweden (GLF)	Gold	20,000^{‡}
^{*} Sales figures based on certification alone.^{‡} Sales+streaming figures based on certification alone.

== Release history ==
Release dates
Region	Date	Format	Label	Ref.
Various	September 20, 2013	Digital download	RCA	
United States	September 24, 2013	Contemporary hit radio	RCA	
Italy	October 18, 2013	Contemporary hit radio	Sony	
