= J-Roc =

- Born: Jerome Harmon; September 25, 1968 (age 58)
- Origin: Fort Worth, Texas, U.S.
- Genres: Hip-hop; R&B; soul; funk
- Occupations: Record producer; songwriter
- Years active: 1993–present
- Website: jeromeharmon.com

Jerome Harmon (born September 25, 1968), better known as J-Roc, is an American songwriter and music producer from Fort Worth, Texas. He frequently collaborates with Timbaland. Jerome Harmon has produced for Beyoncé, Justin Timberlake, Jay-Z, Chris Brown, Keri Hilson, Ashlee Simpson, Mario, Nelly Furtado, Jamie Foxx, Michael Jackson, Kat Dahlia and Chris Cornell.

== Early career ==
J-Roc spent years on the session circuit, where his first credits include playing organ and keyboard on early Kirk Franklin's albums including Kirk Franklin and the Family, Whatcha Lookin' 4, and Kirk Franklin & the Family Christmas. Also he was influenced by kazakh folkloric music so it is tracked in his songs. In 1998, J-ROC co-produced five songs on Wayman Tisdale's critically acclaimed album Decisions. J-Roc worked with Royal Court productions and then with Timbaland's production company in 2007, and contributed to Timbaland's solo album Shock Value as well as Bobby V's album Special Occasion, co-producing the single "Anonymous".

== Selected production discography ==
=== 2013 ===
==== Beyoncé ====
- "Grown Woman"

=== 2018 ===
==== Justin Timberlake - Man of the Woods ====
- "Young Man"

=== 2017 ===
==== Kat Dahlia ====
- "Sirens"
- "Friday Night Majic"

=== 2016 ===
==== Fantasia – The Definition of... ====
- "Crazy"

==== Britney Spears – Glory (Britney Spears album) ====
- "Don't Tell It" (Unreleased)

=== 2014 ===
==== Jennifer Hudson – JHUD ====
- "Walk It Out" (featuring Timbaland)

==== Michael Jackson – Xscape ====
- "Chicago"
- "Loving You"
- "Slave to the Rhythm"
- "Do You Know Where Your Children Are?"
- "Blue Gangsta'"
- "Love Never Felt So Good" (featuring Justin Timberlake)

==== Missy Elliott ====
- "9th Inning" (featuring Timbaland)
- "Triple Threat" (featuring Timbaland)

=== 2013 ===
==== Beyoncé – Beyoncé ====
- "Drunk in Love" (featuring Jay-Z)
- "Blow"
- "Partition"
- "Rocket"
- “Jealous”

==== Justin Timberlake – The 20/20 Experience – 2 of 2 ====
- Gimme What I Don't Know (I Want) (featuring Timbaland)
- True Blood (featuring Timbaland)
- Cabaret (featuring Drake and Timbaland)
- TKO (featuring Timbaland)
- Take Back the Night (featuring Timbaland)
- Murder (featuring Jay-Z and Timbaland)
- Drink You Away
- You Got it On
- Amnesia
- Only When I Walk Away (featuring Timbaland, James Fauntleroy and Brenda Radney)
- Not a Bad Thing
- Electric Lady (featuring Timbaland)

==== Jay-Z – Magna Carta... Holy Grail ====
- Holy Grail (featuring Justin Timberlake)
- Tom Ford
- Picasso Baby (featuring The-Dream and Zofia Borucka Moreno)
- FuckWithMeYouKnowIGotIt (featuring Rick Ross)
- F.U.T.W.
- Versus
- Heaven (featuring Justin Timberlake)
- Part II (On the Run) (featuring Beyoncé)
- Jay-Z Blue
- La Familia

==== Justin Timberlake – The 20/20 Experience ====
- Pusher Love Girl
- Suit & Tie (featuring Jay-Z and Timbaland)
- Don't Hold the Wall (featuring Timbaland)
- Strawberry Bubblegum (featuring Timbaland)
- Tunnel Vision (featuring Timbaland)
- Spaceship Coupe
- That Girl (featuring Timbaland and The Tennessee Kids)
- Let the Groove Get In
- Mirrors
- Blue Ocean Floor

==== Robin Thicke – Blurred Lines ====
- Take It Easy on Me

==== Cher – Closer to the Truth ====
- "I Don't Have To Sleep To Dream"

=== 2012 ===
==== Chris Brown – Fortune ====
- "Trumpet Lights"
- "Tell Somebody"

=== 2011 ===
==== Chris Brown – F.A.M.E. ====
- "Paper Scissors Rock" (featuring Timbaland and Big Sean)

==== Demi Lovato – Unbroken ====
- "All Night Long" (featuring Missy Elliott and Timbaland)

==== Free Sol – No Rules ====
- "Fascinated" (featuring Justin Timberlake and Timbaland)

==== Chris Cornell – Songbook ====
- "As Hope and Promise Fade"
- "Ground Zero"

=== 2010 ===
==== Keri Hilson – No Boys Allowed ====
- "Breaking Point"
- "Beautiful Mistake"
- "Lie to Me" (featuring Timbaland)

==== Michelle Branch – Getaway ====
- "Getaway" (featuring Timbaland)

==== Keyshia Cole – Calling All Hearts ====
- "Last Hangover"

=== 2009 ===
==== Chris Cornell – Scream ====
- "Part of Me" (featuring Timbaland)
- "Time"
- "Sweet Revenge"
- "Get Up"
- "Ground Zero"
- "Never Far Away"
- "Take Me Alive" (featuring Justin Timberlake)
- "Long Gone" (featuring Timbaland)
- "Scream" (featuring Timbaland)
- "Enemy"
- "Other Side of Town"
- "Climbing Up The Walls"
- "Watch Out"
- "Two Drink Minimum" (included as a hidden track inside of "Watch Out")
- "Ordinary Girl" (Deluxe Edition)
- "Lost Cause" (UK Deluxe Edition)
- "Do Me Wrong" (Japan Bonus Track)
- "Stop Me" (Used for promotional services by Verizon Wireless, not included on album)
- "Love Comes Down' (unreleased)
- "Why Do You Follow Me?" (unreleased)

==== Ginuwine – A Man's Thoughts ====
- "Get Involved" (featuring Missy Elliott and Timbaland)

==== Jay-Z – The Blueprint 3 ====
- "Reminder"
- "Off That" (featuring Drake)
- "Venus VS. Mars" (featuring Beyoncé)

==== Timbaland – Timbaland Presents Shock Value II ====
- "Carry Out" (featuring Justin Timberlake)
- "Lose Control" (featuring JoJo)
- "Say Something" (featuring Drake)
- "Tomorrow in the Bottle" (featuring Chad Kroeger and Sebastian)
- "We Belong to the Music" (featuring Miley Cyrus)
- "Morning After Dark" (featuring SoShy and Nelly Furtado)
- "Can You Feel It?" (featuring Esthero)
- "Ease Off the Liquor"
- "Timothy Where You Been" (featuring Jet)
- "Long Way Down" (featuring Daughtry)
- "The One I Love" (featuring Keri Hilson and D.O.E.)
- "Symphony" (featuring Bran'Nu, D.O.E. and Attitude)

==== Shakira – She Wolf ====
- "Give It Up To Me" (featuring Lil Wayne)

=== 2008 ===
==== The Pussycat Dolls – Doll Domination ====
- "Halo"
- "Whatchamacallit"
- "In Person"
- "Magic"

==== Ashlee Simpson – Bittersweet World ====
- "Outta My Head (Ay Ya Ya)"
- "Rule Breaker"
- "Ragdoll"
- "Bittersweet World"
- "What I've Become"
- "Murder"
- "Never Dream Alone"

==== Jamie Foxx – Intuition ====
- "I Don't Need It" (featuring Timbaland)

=== 2007 ===
==== Bobby V – Special Occasion ====
- "Anonymous" (featuring Timbaland)
- "Rearview (Ridin')"

==== Mario – Go! ====
- "No Definition"

=== 2006 ===
==== Fred Hammond – Free to Worship ====
- "Simply Put"
- "More of You"

== Awards and accolades ==
- 2015 BMI R&B/Hip Hop Award for Most Performed Songs "Drunk in Love", "Partition" (by Beyoncé), "Tom Ford", and "Part II (On the Run)" (by Jay-Z)
- 2015 BMI Pop Music Award for "Holy Grail" by Jay-Z featuring Justin Timberlake
- 2015 BMI Pop Music Award for "Not A Bad Thing" by Justin Timberlake
- 57th Grammy Award Winner for Best R&B Song for "Drunk In Love" by Beyoncé
- 57th Grammy Award Winner for Best RnB Performance for "Drunk In Love" by Beyoncé
- 57th Grammy Award Winner for Best Contemporary RnB Album for "Drunk In Love" by Beyoncé(credited as album personnel) (credited as album personnel)
- 57th Grammy Award Winner for Best Surround Sound Album for "Drunk In Love" by Beyoncé(credited as album personnel) (credited as album personnel)
- 56th Grammy Award Winner for Best R&B Song for "Pusher Love Girl" by Justin Timberlake
- 2014 BMI R&B/Hip-Hop Awards – "Top Producers"
- 54th Grammy Award for Best R&B Album for "FAME" by Chris Brown (credited as album personnel)
- 50th Grammy Award for Best Contemporary Gospel Album for "Free to Worship by Fred Hammond(credited as album personnel) (credited as album personnel)
- 2007 Grammy Award for Best Contemporary R&B Gospel Album "Free to Worship" by Fred Hammond(credited as album personnel) (credited as album personnel)
- 2011 BMI Pop Music Award for "Carry Out" by Timbaland featuring Justin Timberlake
- 2011 BMI Urban Music Awards for "Say Something" by Timbaland featuring Drake
- Award/Event: 38th GMA Dove Awards for Best Contemporary Gospel Album of the Year for Free to Worship by Fred Hammond

== Composing and songs in film ==
- Underscore for "Real Steel"
- Motion picture trailer use of "Reminder" by Jay-Z from The Blueprint 3 in the motion picture The Hangover Part II

== Composing and songs in commercials ==
- "Grown Woman" by Beyoncé for Pepsi (2013)
- "Get Away" by Michelle Branch featuring Timbaland for BMW Mini (2012)

== Philanthropy ==
On receiving a Grammy award for the song, "Pusher Love Girl" by Justin Timberlake, J-Roc highlighted the need for funding the arts in education.

"Let's support our school system and the arts programs because we are losing it… we need a lot more people accepting awards like this."

Jerome "J-Roc Tha Ghost" Harmon was also awarded the State's Flag for his work in music by The Texas House of Representatives and in weeks to follow he established five music scholarships in his name while receiving the Keys to the City of Crane, Texas.
