= The 20/20 Experience World Tour =

2013–15 concert tour by Justin Timberlake

- Tour by Justin Timberlake
- Location: Africa; Asia; Europe; North America; Oceania
- Associated album: The 20/20 Experience; The 20/20 Experience – 2 of 2
- Start date: November 6, 2013
- End date: January 2, 2015
- Legs: 6
- No. of shows: 128
- Supporting acts: DJ Freestyle Steve; The Weeknd
- Attendance: 1.9 million
- Box office: $231.6 million ($314.97 million in 2025 dollars)

Justin Timberlake concert chronology
- Legends of the Summer Stadium Tour (2013); The 20/20 Experience World Tour (2013–15); The Man of the Woods Tour (2018–19)

The 20/20 Experience World Tour was the fifth concert tour by American singer-songwriter Justin Timberlake. It was launched in support of his third and fourth studio albums, The 20/20 Experience (2013) and The 20/20 Experience – 2 of 2 (2013). The tour began on November 6, 2013, in New York City, and concluded on January 2, 2015, in Las Vegas. The 20/20 Experience World Tour grossed $231.6 million from 128 shows becoming the second highest-grossing tour of 2014, behind One Direction's Where We Are Tour. This made Timberlake the highest-grossing solo touring artist of the year. It is also Timberlake's most successful tour to date.

Directed by Jonathan Demme, the concert film—titled Justin Timberlake + The Tennessee Kids—premiered on September 13 at the 2016 Toronto International Film Festival. It showcases the final date of the 20/20 tour at Las Vegas' MGM Grand Garden Arena. The streaming service Netflix announced its acquisition ahead of the film's debut at film festival and released it on October 12, 2016. It was the final film to be directed by Demme before his death in April 2017.

== Background ==
On February 22, 2013, it was announced that Timberlake and Jay-Z would embark on the Legends of the Summer Stadium Tour, a co-headlining series of concerts in support of his third studio album, The 20/20 Experience. He headlined the 2013 Yahoo Wireless Festival at Queen Elizabeth Olympic Park for two of the three nights of the festival. The first was July 12, where he headlined alone. The second was July 14, where he headlined with Jay-Z. It served as a preview for the Legends of the Summer tour, which kicked off July 17, in Toronto, Ontario, Canada.

To promote The 20/20 Experience and its sequel, The 20/20 Experience – 2 of 2, further, Timberlake announced on May 5, 2013, that he would embark on The 20/20 Experience World Tour, his second concert tour on a global scale. Promoted primarily by Live Nation, the tour would debut on October 31, 2013, in Montreal, just two months after the Legends of the Summer tour concluded. Twenty-two additional dates were also announced across Canada and the United States, ending on February 10, 2014, in Omaha, Nebraska. Several dates were made available for pre-sale for members of The Tennessee Kids, Timberlake's official fan club. Timberlake's official website noted that, while unannounced, additional dates in Europe, South America and Australia would follow.

== Critical reception ==
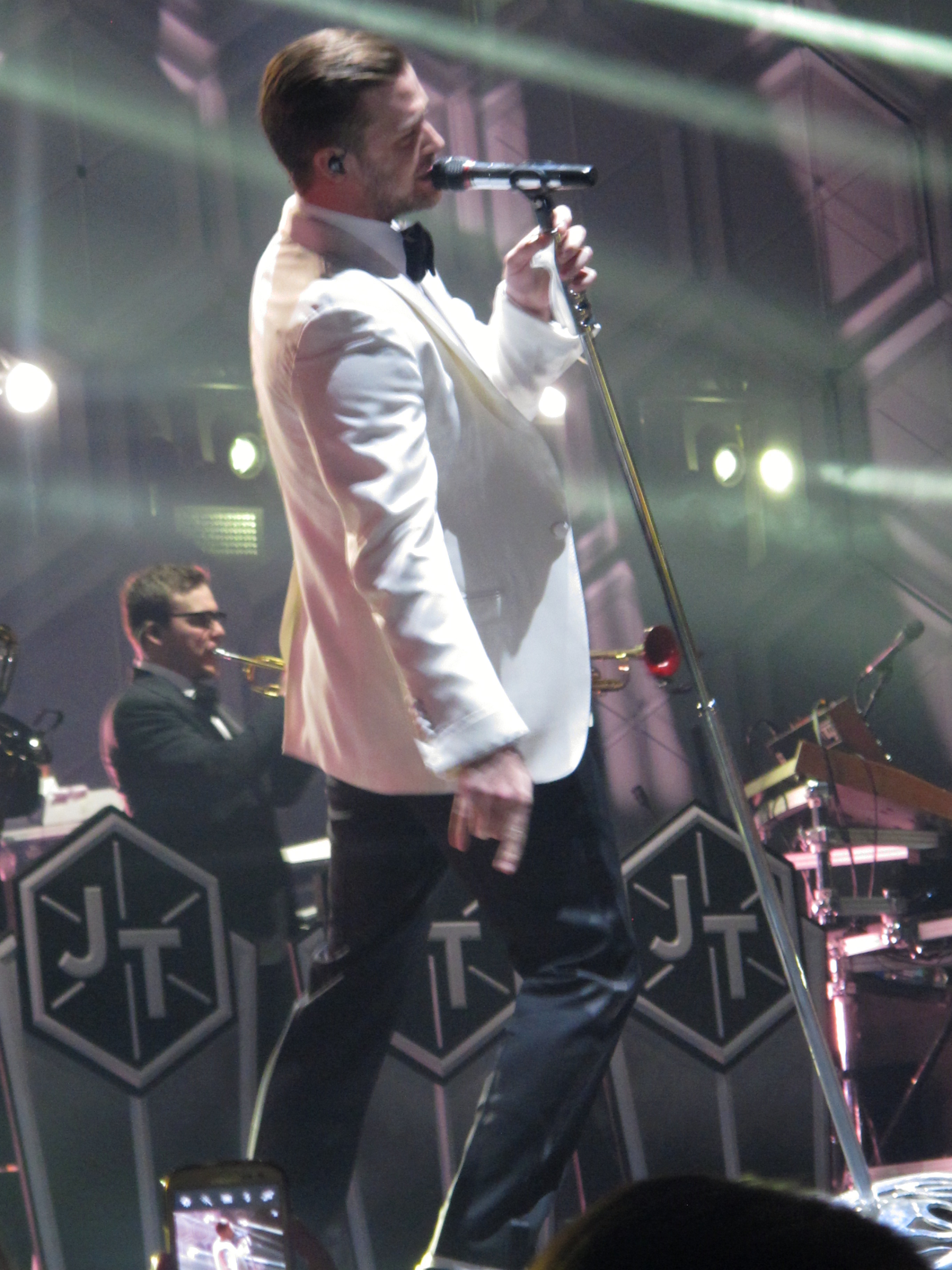
Timberlake performing in February 2014

Writing for the New York Daily News, Jim Farber reviewed the opening show at Barclays Center. Farber described the concert as a "study in suave ease. Starting with 'Pusher Love Girl,' Timberlake exuded a sweatless charm." Hillary Rea for The Philadelphia Inquirer, who attended the tour at the Wells Fargo Center, noted that Timberlake's performance "kept the audience not just alert, but hypnotized and hooked throughout a 30-song spectacle that ended just before midnight." Fionnuala Bourke in a review for Birmingham Mail opined that Justin "managed to completely keep his cool amid all the screams" and he "proved his position as the President of Pop." The Hollywood Reporter's Emily Zemler, described him as a performer who is "genuinely having fun", adding he "knows he's got the looks, but he is also skilled at delivering something that isn't all surface", about the concert at The Forum, Los Angeles.

Francois Marchand of Canada.com said, "As a recording artist, Timberlake's output is debatable. As a showman — and he proved it by stealing the show from Jay Z at last year's Legends of the Summer concert at B.C. Place — he's a tough act to match". Don Chareunsy of the Las Vegas Sun said that Timberlake's Michael Jackson, Elvis Presley, and Bell Biv DeVoe tributes "were some of the standout performances in an overall stellar night. His vocals and dance moves of the greats before him were spot on". Jon Pareles of The New York Times also gave a positive review, noting that he "reveals something darker" and "something more fiery and intense" while performing post-breakup revenge songs such as "Cry Me a River" and "What Goes Around... Comes Around". Jane Stevenson of the Toronto Sun noted that Timberlake's energy "seemed to ramp up in a big way" when performing "Drink You Away", "Señorita", and "Let the Groove Get In".

== Costumes ==
"Justin has great personal style and knows what he wants, which makes designing for him an absolute pleasure. He is a tremendous talent and has a kind of effortless cool that makes classic menswear tailoring modern."

— Tom Ford

Timberlake worked with Tom Ford for the tour's costumes. During their collaboration, they have created more than 600 costumes for Timberlake and his team.

== Broadcast and recordings ==
The concert film Justin Timberlake + The Tennessee Kids premiered on Netflix on October 12, 2016. Before premiering at the Toronto International Film Festival, Timberlake dedicated the film to Prince, who died during post-production. "His influence is all over everyone's music and there's so much that I feel like I've maybe consciously and unconsciously borrowed from him that it felt right", he told E!. "It just feels right to dedicate the film to him".

== Set list ==
The following set list is representative of the show on November 6, 2013. It is not representative of all concerts for the duration of the tour.

1. "Pusher Love Girl"
2. "Gimme What I Don't Know (I Want)" / "Rock Your Body"
3. "Don't Hold the Wall"
4. "FutureSex/LoveSound"
5. "Like I Love You" / "Let Me Talk to You (Prelude)"
6. "My Love"
7. "TKO"
8. "Strawberry Bubblegum"
9. "Summer Love"
10. "LoveStoned / I Think She Knows (Interlude)"
11. "Until the End of Time"
12. "Holy Grail" / "Cry Me a River"
13. "Only When I Walk Away"
14. "True Blood"
15. "Drink You Away"
16. "Tunnel Vision"
17. "Señorita"
18. "Let the Groove Get In"
19. "That Girl"
20. "Heartbreak Hotel"
21. "Not a Bad Thing"
22. "Human Nature"
23. "What Goes Around.../...Comes Around (Interlude)"
24. "Cabaret"
25. "Take Back the Night"
26. "Jungle Boogie" / "Murder" / "Poison"
27. "Suit & Tie"
28. "SexyBack"

Encore

29. "Mirrors"

=== Notes ===
- During the show at Barclays Center on December 14, 2014, Jay Z joined Justin Timberlake on stage to perform "Holy Grail".
- During the show at Bridgestone Arena on December 19, 2014, Garth Brooks joined Timberlake to perform "Friends in Low Places".

== Tour dates ==
List of North American concerts
Date	City	Country	Venue	Opening act	Attendance	Revenue
November 6, 2013	New York City	United States	Barclays Center	The Weeknd	14,513 / 14,513	$1,970,335
November 7, 2013	Hartford	United States	XL Center	The Weeknd	11,967 / 11,967	$1,106,260
November 9, 2013	East Rutherford	United States	Izod Center	The Weeknd	16,110 / 16,110	$1,986,193
November 10, 2013	Philadelphia	United States	Wells Fargo Center	The Weeknd	15,027 / 15,027	$1,676,011
November 13, 2013	Raleigh	United States	PNC Arena	The Weeknd	14,027 / 14,027	$1,567,060
November 15, 2013	Nashville	United States	Bridgestone Arena	The Weeknd	14,415 / 14,415	$1,532,945
November 16, 2013	Columbus	United States	Nationwide Arena	DJ Freestyle Steve	14,764 / 14,764	$1,555,185
November 18, 2013	Memphis	United States	FedExForum	DJ Freestyle Steve	14,005 / 14,005	$1,399,215
November 19, 2013	St. Louis	United States	Scottrade Center	DJ Freestyle Steve	15,519 / 15,519	$1,540,510
November 21, 2013	Tulsa	United States	BOK Center	DJ Freestyle Steve	13,341 / 13,341	$1,519,185
November 26, 2013	Los Angeles	United States	Staples Center	DJ Freestyle Steve	14,414 / 14,414	$1,613,042
November 27, 2013	Anaheim	United States	Honda Center	DJ Freestyle Steve	12,183 / 12,183	$1,411,295
November 29, 2013	Las Vegas	United States	MGM Grand Garden Arena	DJ Freestyle Steve	25,718 / 25,718	$3,683,089
November 30, 2013	Las Vegas	United States	MGM Grand Garden Arena	DJ Freestyle Steve	25,718 / 25,718	$3,683,089
December 2, 2013	Phoenix	United States	US Airways Center	DJ Freestyle Steve	13,782 / 13,782	$1,578,563
December 4, 2013	Dallas	United States	American Airlines Center	DJ Freestyle Steve	14,820 / 14,820	$1,671,448
December 5, 2013	Houston	United States	Toyota Center	DJ Freestyle Steve	12,892 / 12,892	$1,567,629
December 11, 2013	Indianapolis	United States	Bankers Life Fieldhouse	DJ Freestyle Steve	13,797 / 13,797	$1,372,447
December 12, 2013	Cleveland	United States	Quicken Loans Arena	DJ Freestyle Steve	15,452 / 15,452	$1,476,065
December 14, 2013	Pittsburgh	United States	Consol Energy Center	DJ Freestyle Steve	14,371 / 14,371	$1,490,160
December 15, 2013	Louisville	United States	KFC Yum! Center	DJ Freestyle Steve	16,414 / 16,414	$1,692,785
December 17, 2013	Atlanta	United States	Philips Arena	—N/a	13,287 / 13,287	$1,687,436
December 19, 2013	Orlando	United States	Amway Center	—N/a	13,434 / 13,434	$1,521,365
January 13, 2014	Edmonton	Canada	Rexall Place	DJ Freestyle Steve	26,873 / 26,873	$2,896,577
January 14, 2014	Edmonton	Canada	Rexall Place	DJ Freestyle Steve	26,873 / 26,873	$2,896,577
January 16, 2014	Vancouver	Canada	Rogers Arena	DJ Freestyle Steve	13,481 / 13,481	$1,481,451
January 17, 2014	Seattle	United States	KeyArena	DJ Freestyle Steve	12,357 / 12,357	$1,413,755
January 19, 2014	San Jose	United States	SAP Center	DJ Freestyle Steve	13,204 / 13,204	$1,549,737
January 20, 2014	Inglewood	United States	The Forum	DJ Freestyle Steve	13,432 / 13,432	$1,542,566
January 22, 2014	Denver	United States	Pepsi Center	DJ Freestyle Steve	13,839 / 13,839	$1,617,980
February 7, 2014	Fargo	United States	Fargodome	DJ Freestyle Steve	15,639 / 15,639	$1,329,810
February 9, 2014	Saint Paul	United States	Xcel Energy Center	DJ Freestyle Steve	15,102 / 15,102	$1,676,525
February 10, 2014	Omaha	United States	CenturyLink Center Omaha	DJ Freestyle Steve	14,572 / 14,572	$1,620,130
February 13, 2014	Toronto	Canada	Air Canada Centre	DJ Freestyle Steve	30,059 / 30,059	$3,324,289
February 14, 2014	Toronto	Canada	Air Canada Centre	DJ Freestyle Steve	30,059 / 30,059	$3,324,289
February 16, 2014	Chicago	United States	United Center	DJ Freestyle Steve	29,293 / 29,293	$3,702,833
February 17, 2014	Chicago	United States	United Center	DJ Freestyle Steve	29,293 / 29,293	$3,702,833
February 20, 2014	New York City	United States	Madison Square Garden	DJ Freestyle Steve	27,763 / 27,763	$3,663,790
February 21, 2014 (Note: The February 21, 2014, concert at Madison Square Garden in New York City was originally scheduled to take place on February 19, but was rescheduled for health reasons.)	New York City	United States	Madison Square Garden	DJ Freestyle Steve	27,763 / 27,763	$3,663,790
February 24, 2014	Washington, D.C.	United States	Verizon Center	—N/a	14,816 / 14,816	$1,759,759
February 25, 2014	Philadelphia	United States	Wells Fargo Center	DJ Freestyle Steve	15,648 / 15,648	$1,787,142
February 27, 2014	Boston	United States	TD Garden	DJ Freestyle Steve	13,815 / 13,815	$1,622,639
March 4, 2014	Sunrise	United States	BB&T Center	DJ Freestyle Steve	12,629 / 12,629	$1,517,577
March 5, 2014	Miami	United States	American Airlines Arena	DJ Freestyle Steve	13,008 / 13,008	$1,609,449

List of European, Asian, and African concerts
Date	City	Country	Venue	Opening act	Attendance	Revenue
March 30, 2014	Sheffield	England	Motorpoint Arena Sheffield	DJ Freestyle Steve	10,009 / 10,009	$1,305,817
April 1, 2014	London	England	The O_{2} Arena	DJ Freestyle Steve	44,795 / 44,795 (Note: The score data is combined from the shows held at the O_{2} Arena on April 1, 2014, April 2, 2014, and June 10, 2014, respectively.)	$6,520,355
April 2, 2014	London	England	The O_{2} Arena	DJ Freestyle Steve	44,795 / 44,795	$6,520,355
April 4, 2014	Glasgow	Scotland	SSE Hydro	DJ Freestyle Steve	20,863 / 20,863	$2,360,195
April 5, 2014	Glasgow	Scotland	SSE Hydro	DJ Freestyle Steve	20,863 / 20,863	$2,360,195
April 7, 2014	Manchester	England	Phones 4u Arena	DJ Freestyle Steve	25,107 / 25,107	$3,300,208
April 8, 2014	Manchester	England	Phones 4u Arena	DJ Freestyle Steve	25,107 / 25,107	$3,300,208
April 11, 2014	Birmingham	England	LG Arena	DJ Freestyle Steve	24,542 / 24,542	$3,449,688
April 12, 2014	Birmingham	England	LG Arena	DJ Freestyle Steve	24,542 / 24,542	$3,449,688
April 14, 2014	Zürich	Switzerland	Hallenstadion	DJ Freestyle Steve	27,140 / 27,140	$3,220,932
April 16, 2014	Zürich	Switzerland	Hallenstadion	DJ Freestyle Steve	27,140 / 27,140	$3,220,932
April 18, 2014	Arnhem	Netherlands	GelreDome	DJ Freestyle Steve	36,644 / 36,644	$3,322,812
April 20, 2014	Cologne	Germany	Lanxess Arena	DJ Freestyle Steve	30,047 / 30,047	$3,115,442
April 22, 2014	Cologne	Germany	Lanxess Arena	DJ Freestyle Steve	30,047 / 30,047	$3,115,442
April 24, 2014	Berlin	Germany	O_{2} World	DJ Freestyle Steve	27,447 / 27,447 (Note: The score data is combined from the shows held at the O_{2} World on May 24, 2014, and June 6, 2014, respectively.)	$2,794,830
April 26, 2014	Paris	France	Stade de France	DJ Freestyle Steve	57,286 / 57,286	$5,241,720
April 28, 2014	Amsterdam	Netherlands	Ziggo Dome	DJ Freestyle Steve	15,383 / 15,383	$1,624,794
May 1, 2014	Antwerp	Belgium	Sportpaleis	DJ Freestyle Steve	36,141 / 36,141	$4,047,099
May 2, 2014	Antwerp	Belgium	Sportpaleis	DJ Freestyle Steve	36,141 / 36,141	$4,047,099
May 4, 2014	Hamburg	Germany	O_{2} World	DJ Freestyle Steve	12,312 / 12,312	$1,283,422
May 6, 2014	Copenhagen	Denmark	Telia Parken	DJ Freestyle Steve	49,398 / 49,398	$5,147,387
May 8, 2014	Oslo	Norway	Telenor Arena	DJ Freestyle Steve	19,050 / 19,050	$2,087,482
May 10, 2014	Stockholm	Sweden	Tele2 Arena	DJ Freestyle Steve	26,602 / 26,602	$2,648,177
May 12, 2014	Helsinki	Finland	Hartwall Areena	DJ Freestyle Steve	12,216 / 12,216	$1,367,648
May 15, 2014	Saint Petersburg	Russia	SKK Peterburgsky	DJ Freestyle Steve	17,334 / 22,000	$1,953,844
May 17, 2014	Moscow	Russia	Olimpiyskiy	DJ Freestyle Steve	22,705 / 23,000	$3,845,775
May 23, 2014	Abu Dhabi	United Arab Emirates	du Arena	DJ Freestyle Steve	24,873 / 24,873	$3,622,820
May 26, 2014	Istanbul	Turkey	İTÜ Stadyumu	DJ Freestyle Steve	32,459 / 35,656	$3,154,353
May 28, 2014	Tel Aviv	Israel	HaYarkon Park	DJ Freestyle Steve	44,634 / 49,924	$5,169,975
May 30, 2014 (Note: The May 30, 2014, concert was part of the Mawazine festival.)	Rabat	Morocco	OLM Souissi	—N/a	—N/a	—N/a
June 1, 2014 (Note: The June 1, 2014, concert at Bela Vista Park in Lisbon, Portugal was part of Rock in Rio.)	Lisbon	Portugal	Bela Vista Park	—N/a	—N/a	—N/a
June 3, 2014	Prague	Czech Republic	O_{2} Arena	DJ Freestyle Steve	15,727 / 15,727	$1,332,516
June 4, 2014	Vienna	Austria	Wiener Stadthalle	DJ Freestyle Steve	13,748 / 13,748	$1,598,539
June 6, 2014	Berlin	Germany	O_{2} World	DJ Freestyle Steve	—	—
June 8, 2014	Frankfurt	Germany	Commerzbank-Arena	DJ Freestyle Steve	38,646 / 38,646	$3,841,803
June 10, 2014	London	England	The O_{2} Arena	DJ Freestyle Steve	—	—

List of North American concerts
Date	City	Country	Venue	Opening act	Attendance	Revenue
July 9, 2014 (Note: The July 9, 2014, concert at the First Niagara Center in Buffalo was originally scheduled to take place on February 22, 2014, but was postponed as a consequence of the postponement of the Manhattan concert.)	Buffalo	United States	First Niagara Center	DJ Freestyle Steve	15,152 / 15,152	$1,412,080
July 10, 2014	New York City	United States	Hammerstein Ballroom	—N/a	—N/a	—N/a
July 12, 2014	Charlotte	United States	Time Warner Cable Arena	DJ Freestyle Steve	15,029 / 15,029	$1,836,091
July 14, 2014	Baltimore	United States	Baltimore Arena	DJ Freestyle Steve	12,051 / 12,051	$1,288,155
July 16, 2014	Albany	United States	Times Union Center	DJ Freestyle Steve	11,730 / 11,730	$1,127,495
July 18, 2014	Uncasville	United States	Mohegan Sun Arena	DJ Freestyle Steve	7,090 / 7,090	$785,270
July 19, 2014 (Note: The July 19, 2014, concert at the TD Garden in Boston was originally scheduled to take place on November 4, 2013, but was rescheduled to allow more time for rehearsals.)	Boston	United States	TD Garden	DJ Freestyle Steve	14,119 / 14,119	$1,610,576
July 22, 2014	Ottawa	Canada	Canadian Tire Centre	DJ Freestyle Steve	13,032 / 13,032	$1,293,992
July 25, 2014 (Note: The July 25, 2014, concert at the Bell Centre in Montreal was originally scheduled to take place on October 31, 2013, but was rescheduled to allow more time for rehearsals.)	Montreal	Canada	Bell Centre	DJ Freestyle Steve	30,698 / 30,698	$3,357,926
July 26, 2014 (Note: The July 26, 2014, concert at the Bell Centre in Montreal was originally scheduled to take place on November 1, 2013, but was rescheduled to allow more time for rehearsals.)	Montreal	Canada	Bell Centre	DJ Freestyle Steve	30,698 / 30,698	$3,357,926
July 28, 2014	Auburn Hills	United States	The Palace of Auburn Hills	DJ Freestyle Steve	13,527 / 13,527	$1,401,004
July 30, 2014	Kansas City	United States	Sprint Center	DJ Freestyle Steve	27,458 / 27,458	$2,955,180
July 31, 2014	Kansas City	United States	Sprint Center	DJ Freestyle Steve	27,458 / 27,458	$2,955,180
August 3, 2014	New Orleans	United States	Smoothie King Center	DJ Freestyle Steve	13,743 / 13,743	$1,494,735
August 5, 2014	San Antonio	United States	AT&T Center	DJ Freestyle Steve	14,588 / 14,588	$1,603,585
August 8, 2014	Las Vegas	United States	MGM Grand Garden Arena	DJ Freestyle Steve	13,168 / 13,168	$1,908,499
August 9, 2014	Glendale	United States	Jobing.com Arena	DJ Freestyle Steve	12,573 / 12,573	$1,526,769
August 11, 2014	San Jose	United States	SAP Center	DJ Freestyle Steve	13,447 / 13,447	$1,595,496
August 12, 2014	Los Angeles	United States	Staples Center	DJ Freestyle Steve	14,520 / 14,520	$1,801,834

List of European concerts
Date	City	Country	Venue	Opening act	Attendance	Revenue
August 16, 2014 (Note: The August 16, 2014, concert at Hylands Park in Chelmsford was part of the V Festival.)	Chelmsford	England	Hylands Park	—N/a	—N/a	—N/a
August 17, 2014 (Note: The August 17, 2014, concert at Weston Park in Staffordshire was part of the V Festival.)	Weston-under-Lizard	England	Weston Park	—N/a	—N/a	—N/a
August 19, 2014	Gdańsk	Poland	PGE Arena Gdańsk	DJ Freestyle Steve	40,794 / 40,794	$3,878,582
August 21, 2014	Paris	France	L'Olympia	—N/a	—N/a	—N/a
August 24, 2014	Kópavogur	Iceland	Kórinn	DJ Freestyle Steve	17,442 / 17,442	$2,195,447

List of Oceanic concerts
Date	City	Country	Venue	Opening act	Attendance	Revenue
September 18, 2014	Melbourne	Australia	Etihad Stadium	DJ Freestyle Steve	41,777 / 41,777	$5,765,602
September 19, 2014	Melbourne	Australia	Etihad Stadium	DJ Freestyle Steve	41,777 / 41,777	$5,765,602
September 22, 2014	Adelaide	Australia	Adelaide Entertainment Arena	DJ Freestyle Steve	12,658 / 12,658	$1,799,621
September 23, 2014	Adelaide	Australia	Adelaide Entertainment Arena	DJ Freestyle Steve	12,658 / 12,658	$1,799,621
September 26, 2014	Brisbane	Australia	Brisbane Entertainment Centre	DJ Freestyle Steve	19,757 / 19,757	$2,735,476
September 27, 2014	Brisbane	Australia	Brisbane Entertainment Centre	DJ Freestyle Steve	19,757 / 19,757	$2,735,476
October 1, 2014	Sydney	Australia	Allphones Arena	DJ Freestyle Steve	28,500 / 28,500	$5,070,062
October 2, 2014	Sydney	Australia	Allphones Arena	DJ Freestyle Steve	28,500 / 28,500	$5,070,062
October 8, 2014	Perth	Australia	Perth Arena	DJ Freestyle Steve	22,519 / 22,519	$3,011,452
October 9, 2014	Perth	Australia	Perth Arena	DJ Freestyle Steve	22,519 / 22,519	$3,011,452
October 12, 2014	Auckland	New Zealand	Vector Arena	DJ Freestyle Steve	34,587 / 34,587	$4,129,997
October 13, 2014	Auckland	New Zealand	Vector Arena	DJ Freestyle Steve	34,587 / 34,587	$4,129,997
October 15, 2014	Auckland	New Zealand	Vector Arena	DJ Freestyle Steve	34,587 / 34,587	$4,129,997

List of North American concerts
Date	City	Country	Venue	Opening act	Attendance	Revenue
November 20, 2014	Portland	United States	Moda Center	DJ Freestyle Steve	13,929 / 13,929	$1,499,534
November 22, 2014	Oakland	United States	Oracle Arena	DJ Freestyle Steve	13,085 / 13,085	$1,475,559
November 24, 2014	Inglewood	United States	The Forum	DJ Freestyle Steve	12,593 / 12,593	$1,450,586
November 26, 2014	Anaheim	United States	Honda Center	DJ Freestyle Steve	11,704 / 11,704	$1,386,091
November 28, 2014	Las Vegas	United States	MGM Grand Garden Arena	DJ Freestyle Steve	12,949 / 12,949	$1,866,329
December 1, 2014	Houston	United States	Toyota Center	DJ Freestyle Steve	12,654 / 12,654	$1,712,300
December 3, 2014	Dallas	United States	American Airlines Center	DJ Freestyle Steve	14,855 / 14,855	$1,668,554
December 5, 2014	Oklahoma City	United States	Chesapeake Energy Arena	DJ Freestyle Steve	12,662 / 12,662	$1,388,971
December 8, 2014	Chicago	United States	United Center	DJ Freestyle Steve	14,951 / 14,951	$1,905,303
December 10, 2014	Toronto	Canada	Air Canada Centre	DJ Freestyle Steve	15,648 / 15,648	$1,675,965
December 13, 2014	Uncasville	United States	Mohegan Sun Arena	DJ Freestyle Steve	7,068 / 7,068	$780,915
December 14, 2014	New York City	United States	Barclays Center	DJ Freestyle Steve	14,461 / 14,461	$1,960,366
December 17, 2014	Philadelphia	United States	Wells Fargo Center	DJ Freestyle Steve	15,510 / 15,510	$1,791,973
December 19, 2014	Nashville	United States	Bridgestone Arena	DJ Freestyle Steve	14,334 / 14,334	$1,597,540
December 20, 2014	Duluth	United States	The Arena at Gwinnett Center	DJ Freestyle Steve	10,335 / 10,335	$1,343,945
January 1, 2015	Las Vegas	United States	MGM Grand Garden Arena	DJ Freestyle Steve	24,799 / 24,799	$4,436,453
January 2, 2015	Las Vegas	United States	MGM Grand Garden Arena	DJ Freestyle Steve	24,799 / 24,799	$4,436,453

== Personnel ==
Credits and personnel are taken from Justin Timberlake's official website.

Lead Singer

- Justin Timberlake

Dancers

- Dana Wilson
- Ivan Koumaev
- Lyle Beniga
- Lindsay Richardson
- Natalie Gilmore
- Matt Aylward
- Nick Bass

Backup Singers

- Zenya Bashford
- Aaron Camper
- Erin Stevenson
- Jack E. King
- Nicole Hurst

Band

- Adam Blackstone (music director, Bass)
- Elliott Ives (Guitar)
- Mike Scott (Guitar)
- Eric Smith (Bass)
- Charlie Orias (Bass/Backup)
- Dontae Winslow (Trumpet)
- Sean Erick (Trumpet, The Regiment Horns)
- Justin Gilbert (Keyboard Player)
- Brian Frasier-Moore (Drums)
- Daniel Jones (Keyboard)
- Kevin Williams (Trombone, flute, tuba, The Regiment Horns)
- Terry Santiel (Percussionist)
- Leon Silva (Saxophonist, The Regiment Horns)

Production Crew

- Robert "Bongo" Longo (Justin Personal Tech : Guitar/Piano/Rhodes)

Engineers

- Danny Cheung (Pro Tools)
