= Take Back the Night (song) =

Single by Justin Timberlake

from the album The 20/20 Experience – 2 of 2
- Released: July 12, 2013
- Recorded: May–July 2012
- Studio: EastWest (Los Angeles); Jungle City (New York)
- Genre: Disco; R&B
- Length: 5:55 (album version); 4:32 (radio edit)
- Label: RCA
- Songwriters: Justin Timberlake; Timothy Mosley; Jerome "J-Roc" Harmon; James Fauntleroy
- Producers: Timbaland; Justin Timberlake; Jerome "J-Roc" Harmon

Justin Timberlake singles chronology
"Holy Grail" (2013)	"Take Back the Night" (2013)	"TKO" (2013)

"Take Back the Night" is a song by American singer Justin Timberlake from his fourth studio album, The 20/20 Experience – 2 of 2 (2013). It was released by RCA Records as the lead single from the album on July 12, 2013. "Take Back the Night" was written and produced by Timberlake, Timothy "Timbaland" Mosley and Jerome "J-Roc" Harmon, with additional writing from James Fauntleroy. Musically, it is a disco and R&B song that addresses a potential love interest.

"Take Back the Night" received mixed-to-positive reviews from music critics, noticing its similarity to Michael Jackson's works and "poppier" accessibility compared to Timberlake's previous album, but criticized its length. Commercially, it reached the top forty positions in most countries, peaking at number 29 on the Billboard Hot 100, with higher success on the Pop Airplay charts at number 14 and number eight on the Hot R&B/Hip-Hop Songs charts. The song gathered controversy with the Take Back the Night Foundation, an anti-rape organization, which expressed concerns about the similarities between the song's title and the organization's name.

The music video for "Take Back the Night" was directed by Jeff Nicholas, Jonathan Craven, and Darren Craig, and premiered on July 30 on Timberlake's YouTube channel. In the music video, Timberlake walks through Chinatown and performs on the sidewalk, later riding in a "classic car" during the night. The song was part of the set list for Timberlake's Legends of the Summer Stadium Tour (2013) with rapper Jay-Z and his fifth solo tour, The 20/20 Experience World Tour (2013–15).

== Production and release ==
"Take Back the Night" was written by Timberlake, Timothy "Timbaland" Mosley, Jerome "J-Roc" Harmon, and James Fauntleroy, and produced by Timbaland, Timberlake, and Harmon. Timberlake arranged and produced his vocals, which were recorded at Jungle City Studios in New York City, New York. Harmon provided keyboards for it, while Elliott Ives played the guitar. Benjamin Wright and The Benjamin Wright Orchestra played the horns, while Terry Santiel played the percussion. Chris Godbey, with assistance from Alejandro Baima, engineered it, Dave Kutch mastered it, and Jimmy Douglass mixed it with Godbey and Timberlake at Jungle City Studios.

While releasing and promoting The 20/20 Experience, Timberlake revealed that he only released half of the album, and announced and that the second half would be released in November. In May 2013, he announced that it would be released in September. On July 10, 2013, Timberlake posted a 45-second video on his official YouTube channel. In the video, Timberlake is seen hopping out of a convertible holding several white signs in his right hand. The signs list the various release dates of Timberlake's 2013 releases – "Suit & Tie January 14th", "Mirrors February 11th" and "The 20/20 Experience March 19th".

The next card reads "Take Back the Night", while the final card displays a blurred-out sign that was presumed to be its release date. Timberlake then walks into a club, and a 10-second snippet of the song is played. The video closes with a message that reads: "The 20/20 Experience Continues..." Jason Lipshutz of Billboard was confused by the announcement, stating that if "Take Back the Night" is a new single, "it will blow by 'Tunnel Vision' which was bestowed with a controversial music video last week but has not yet been promoted to radio as the third official single from The 20/20 Experience." Two days later, on July 12, the full audio for "Take Back the Night" was posted to Timberlake's YouTube channel at noon Eastern time. The song was offered as a free download with a pre-order of The 20/20 Experience: 2 of 2 on the iTunes Store on the same date.

== Composition ==
"Take Back the Night"
A 30-second sample of "Take Back the Night".

"Take Back the Night" is a disco and R&B song, with a length of five minutes and fifty-five seconds. It carries a "sleek, rhythmic pop production", with instrumentation consisting of stirring strings, percolating percussion horn stabs, thumping bass and waka-waka guitars. Jason Lipshutz of Billboard wrote that the song "nods to Off the Wall-era Michael Jackson", while MTV News' James Montgomery declared "Take Back the Night" a "sumptuous slice" of "Off the Wall-indebted disco" that seems "custom-made for roller rinks everywhere (or at least the five that are still open for business in 2013)". The song contains a "dizzyingly light hook". Similarly, a reviewer of Spin wrote that the song has a distinct Jackson vibe, "throwing back to soul's post-disco evolution, infusing dance floor rhythms with impeccable class." According to Lipshutz, the song is also a "souped-up version" of "Let the Groove Get In".

According to Lipshutz, "Take Back the Night" contains "little lyrical purpose aside from provoking its listener to move". Timberlake sings of trying to woo a would-be lover: "Girl, this was your city/You did it all and more/Broke every law except for one, babe: attraction". During the chorus, "he gets a little more direct", begging the object of his affection to join him on the dance floor: "Your love's a weapon/Give your body some direction/that's my aim/And we can take back the night". During its outro, it contains staccato-ed guitars and blasts of horns, each of which is announced by Timberlake.

=== Controversy ===
Shortly after the song was released, the Take Back the Night Foundation, an anti-rape organization, expressed concerns about the similarities between the song's title and the organization's name. Executive director of the foundation, Katherine Koestner, was critical of the lyrics, telling Radar Online that "The lyrics are definitely very sexual and not at all clearly anti-sexual violence. 'Use me,' for example, is not a great phrase for anyone affiliated with the organization." Take Back the Night sent Timberlake's lawyers a letter detailing their concerns. Shortly after that, the singer apologized, saying that he was unaware of the organization and has come forward to support them. The anti-rape organization, for their part, has decided not to pursue any suit against the singer, with Koestner saying, "At this point, we're going to bow down gracefully, and accept that fighting this in court probably isn't the best use of anyone's time."

== Music video ==
The music video for "Take Back the Night" was shot on July 18, 2013, in New York City. In the video, Timberlake walks the streets of Chinatown and performs in a black-and-white outfit on the sidewalk. In another scene, he is seen riding in a "classic car" during the night. The "Take Back the Night" video was directed by Jeff Nicholas, Jonathan Craven, and Darren Craig. According to a press release, the video "harkens back to the days when nightlife ruled the city and beckons everyone within earshot that the night holds endless possibilities." Beginning on July 30 at 7 am, fans can visit a custom website for a "virtual journey throughout New York City", which will offer fun facts about the music video. Twitter hashtags will be incorporated to enhance the experience. The music video on YouTube has received over 37 million views as of January 2026.

== Critical reception ==
"Take Back the Night" received mixed to positive reviews from music critics. A reviewer of Fact wrote, "Horn-addled and packed with the kind of effortless swagger the singer exudes so well, 'Take Back the Night' will no doubt field comparisons to prime-era Michael Jackson, and that's no bad thing at all." The comparison was echoed by Spin and New York Post, both of whom reacted favorably to the song. Writing for Vulture, Amanda Dobbins praised the "poorly named, pretty fun single" for being "a solid one, with a heavy disco vibe and the all-important handclaps", but also frowned upon its length. Lewis Corner of Digital Spy gave the song 3 stars out of 5 in a review that observed: "While the final result won't have us running off to dust down the disco ball and whip out the flared trousers, its subtle funk is enough to keep our attention firmly focussed on what's to come."

Melinda Newman of HitFix wrote that the song is more accessible and "poppier" than the experimental material on The 20/20 Experience, "but still feels like a cousin to some of the material on that album, in part because of the beats and producer Timbaland's delightful reliance on staccato horns punctuating certain verses." Mikael Wood of the Los Angeles Times gave the song a mixed review, describing it as a "weak outtake from The 20/20 Experience; it's plush but not luxurious, funky but not propulsive". Taylor Balkom in his The Daily Reveille review graded the song a C+, writing "the song is only okay ... it isn't anything we haven't heard before." Slant Magazine's Eric Henderson was also rather critical of the song, perceiving it to be an "(intentional?) cognitive dissonance centering a blockbuster club ode to hedonism around a phrase everyone knows means "do not rape.""

== Commercial performance ==
"Take Back the Night" reached the top forty positions in most countries. In the United States, "Take Back the Night" debuted at number 47, before climbing eight spots to number 39. Eventually, the song reached a peak of number 29, becoming Timberlake's lowest charting-single in the United States. The song was a little better on the Pop Songs chart, debuting at number 20, becoming the greatest gainer of the week, before peaking at number 14. On the Hot R&B/Hip-Hop Songs chart, it reached the top ten, peaking at number 8, becoming his sixth top ten on the R&B charts. On the Billboard airplay charts, it reached number 23 on the Adult R&B Songs chart, number 21 on the Adult Pop Airplay chart, and at number 10 on the Rhythmic Airplay chart. In the United Kingdom, the song also failed to reach the top twenty, peaking at number 22, remaining one of his lowest charting solo singles, only losing to "Tunnel Vision". Also in the United Kingdom, the song reached number 4 on the UK Airplay chart.

In Australia, the song missed the top forty, only reaching number 57. However, it reached number 11 on the urban chart. In Belgium, it reached number 26 in Flanders, and number 6 on its urban chart, but missed the top forty in Wallonia, only reaching number 45. In Canada, it reached number 23. In Denmark, it reached number 37. In Ireland, the song missed the top forty, only reaching number 49, while in Italy, the song only reached number 54. In Germany, the song only peaked at number 52. In Japan, the song reached number 15. In the Netherlands, the song reached number 23 on the Dutch Top 40, and at number 38 on Single Top 100. In France, the song was his only single to miss the top forty, only peaking at number 85. In Switzerland, "Take Back the Night" became Timberlake's lowest charting solo single, only reaching number 48 - his lowest was 2003's "I'm Lovin' It", with a peak of number 47.

== Live performances ==
Timberlake performed the song live for the first time at the Wireless Festival on July 12, 2013. On August 25, 2013, Timberlake also performed the song at the 2013 MTV Video Music Awards at Barclays Center as part of a medley. The song was featured on Timberlake's 2013–15 The 20/20 Experience World Tour, as well as his 2013 Legends of the Summer Stadium Tour with rapper Jay-Z.

== Track listings ==
- CD single
1. "Take Back the Night" (album version) – 5:53
2. "Take Back the Night" (radio edit) – 4:33
- Digital download
1. "Take Back the Night" – 5:55

== Credits and personnel ==
Credits are adapted from the liner notes of "Take Back the Night" CD single.

Locations

- Vocals recorded and mixed at Jungle City Studios in New York City, New York

Personnel

- Timothy "Timbaland" Mosley – producer, songwriter
- Justin Timberlake – mixer, producer, songwriter, vocal producer, vocal arranger
- Jerome "J-Roc" Harmon – keyboards, producer, songwriter
- James Fauntleroy – songwriter
- Elliot Ives – guitar
- Benjamin Wright & The Benjamin Wright Orchestra – horns
- Terry Santiel – percussion

Technical

- Chris Godbey – engineer, mixer
- Jimmy Douglass – mixer
- Alejandro Baima – assistant engineer
- Dave Kutch – mastering engineer

== Charts ==
=== Weekly charts ===
Weekly chart performance
Chart (2013)	Peak position
Australia (ARIA)	57
Australian Urban (ARIA)	11
Belgium (Ultratop 50 Flanders)	26
Belgium Urban (Ultratop Flanders)	6
Belgium (Ultratop 50 Wallonia)	45
Canada Hot 100 (Billboard)	23
Denmark (Tracklisten)	37
France (SNEP)	85
Germany (GfK)	52
Ireland (IRMA)	49
Italy (FIMI)	54
Japan Hot 100 (Billboard)	15
Netherlands (Dutch Top 40)	23
Netherlands (Single Top 100)	38
Romania (Romanian Top 100)	97
Scottish Singles Sales (Official Charts)	31
Slovenia (SloTop50)	36
Switzerland (Schweizer Hitparade)	48
UK Singles (Official Charts)	22
UK Airplay (Music Week)	4
US Billboard Hot 100	29
US Hot R&B/Hip-Hop Songs (Billboard)	8
US Adult R&B Songs (Billboard)	23
US Adult Pop Airplay (Billboard)	21
US Pop Airplay (Billboard)	14
US Rhythmic Airplay (Billboard)	10

=== Year-end charts ===
Year-end chart performance
Chart (2013)	Position
Belgium Urban (Ultratop Flanders)	33
Japan (Japan Hot 100)	100
Netherlands (Dutch Top 40)	125
US Hot R&B/Hip-Hop Songs (Billboard)	44

== Certifications ==
Certifications
Region	Certification	Certified units/sales
Brazil (Pro-Música Brasil)	Gold	30,000^{‡}
Canada (Music Canada)	Gold	40,000^{*}
Sweden (GLF)	Gold	20,000^{‡}
^{*} Sales figures based on certification alone.^{‡} Sales+streaming figures based on certification alone.

== Release history ==
Release dates
Region	Date	Format	Label	Ref.
Various	July 12, 2013	Digital download	RCA	
United States	July 16, 2013	Contemporary hit radio	RCA	
Italy	July 26, 2013	Contemporary hit radio	Sony	
United States	August 6, 2013	Hot AC radio	RCA	
United States	August 19, 2013	Urban radio	RCA	
Germany	August 30, 2013	CD single	Sony	
