= Justin Timberlake discography =

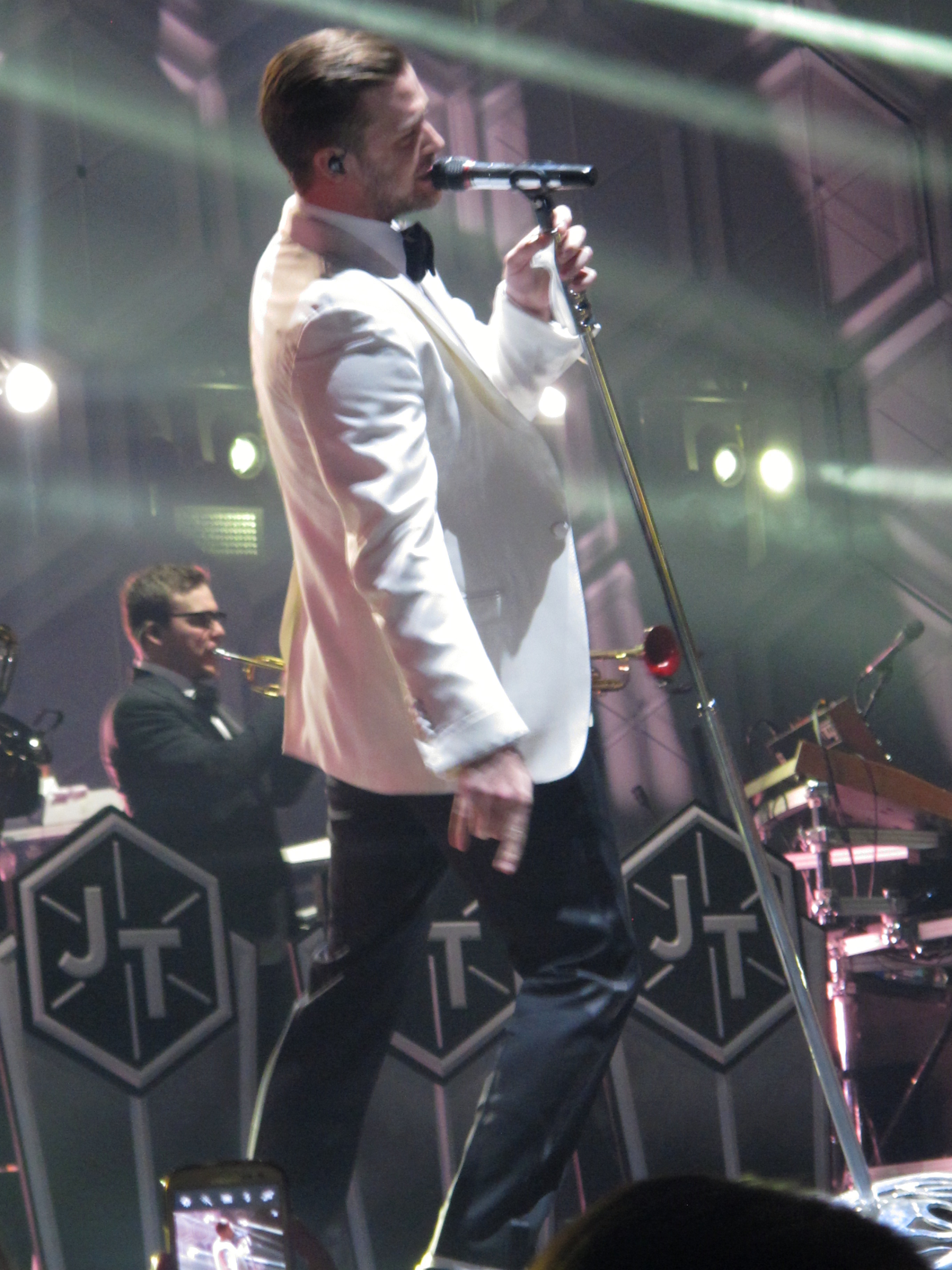
- Timberlake performing during The 20/20 Experience World Tour, February 2014. It is Timberlake's highest-grossing tour
- Studio albums: 6
- Extended plays: 3
- Soundtrack albums: 2
- Compilation albums: 2
- Singles: 52

American singer Justin Timberlake has released six studio albums, two compilation albums, three extended plays, and 52 singles (including 20 as a featured artist). Timberlake started his music career in 1995, as a member of boy band NSYNC. Following the group's hiatus in 2002, he released his solo debut studio album, Justified, in November that same year. The album was a commercial success and peaked at number two on the US Billboard 200 chart and additionally topped the charts in Ireland and the United Kingdom. Justified earned multiple multi-platinum certifications, including a triple platinum certification from the Recording Industry Association of America (RIAA) and a sextuple platinum certification from the British Phonographic Industry (BPI). It produced four singles: "Like I Love You", "Cry Me a River", "Rock Your Body" and "Señorita"; all performed well commercially, with two of them becoming top 5 hits on the US Billboard Hot 100 chart and top two hits on the UK Singles Chart. "Rock Your Body" also reached number one in Australia.

FutureSex/LoveSounds, Timberlake's second studio album, was released in September 2006. Like its predecessor, the album achieved commercial success internationally and topped the Billboard 200 chart; it also reached number one in countries such as Australia, Canada and the United Kingdom. It was later certified seven times platinum by the RIAA and six times platinum by the Australian Recording Industry Association (ARIA); it sold over 10 million copies worldwide. Six singles were released from FutureSex/LoveSounds, including the Billboard Hot 100 chart number-one hits "SexyBack", "My Love" and "What Goes Around... Comes Around". Throughout the late 2000s, Timberlake collaborated with several artists on multiple Hot 100 top ten singles, including "Give It to Me" by Timbaland, "Ayo Technology" by 50 Cent, "4 Minutes" by Madonna, "Dead and Gone" by T.I. and "Love Sex Magic" by Ciara.

In March 2013, after a six-year hiatus from his solo music career, Timberlake released his third studio album, The 20/20 Experience – it topped the charts in various countries and set a digital sales record for being the fastest-selling album on the iTunes Store. The 20/20 Experience was the top-selling album in the United States of 2013, selling 2,427,000 copies by the end of the year. The album spawned three singles including the international hits "Suit & Tie" and "Mirrors"; the latter reached number two on the Hot 100 chart and topped the UK Singles Chart. In September 2013, Timberlake released the second half of the project, The 20/20 Experience – 2 of 2. It produced three singles including "Not a Bad Thing", which reached number eight on the Hot 100 chart. In 2016, Timberlake serves as the executive music producer for the soundtrack to DreamWorks Animation's Trolls, accompanied by the release of "Can't Stop the Feeling!", his fifth chart-topping single on the Hot 100. It was certified Diamond in France and Poland.

On February 2, 2018, Timberlake released his fifth studio album, Man of the Woods. It topped the Billboard 200 with the biggest first week sales of the year at the time, selling 293,000 total units. The album was supported by the two top-ten singles, "Filthy" and "Say Something". Man of the Woods also marks Timberlake's fourth consecutive No. 1 album and has since been certified Platinum by the Recording Industry Association of America (RIAA). Man of the Woods concluded 2018 as the sixth best-selling album of the year.

Timberlake's sixth studio album, Everything I Thought It Was was released on March 15, 2024. The album debuted at number four on the US Billboard 200, giving Timberlake his sixth consecutive top five album in the country. Everything I Thought It Was was supported by two singles, the top-twenty single, "Selfish" which peaked at number 19 on the Billboard Hot 100 and "No Angels", as well as the promotional single, "Drown".

== Albums ==
=== Studio albums ===
List of studio albums, with selected chart positions, sales figures and certifications
| Title | Album details | Peak chart positions | | | | | | | | | | Sales | Certifications |
| Title | Album details | US | AUS | CAN | DEN | GER | IRE | NL | NZ | SWI | UK | Sales | Certifications |
|---|---|---|---|---|---|---|---|---|---|---|---|---|---|
| Justified | Released: November 5, 2002; Label: Jive; Formats: CD, LP, cassette, digital download, streaming | 2 | 9 | 3 | 4 | 11 | 1 | 4 | 5 | 22 | 1 | US: 3,969,000 (Note: United States sales figures for Justified, FutureSex/LoveSounds, The 20/20 Experience and 2 of 2 as of February 4, 2018.); UK: 2,012,000 (Note: United Kingdom sales figures for Justified as of February 9, 2018.) | RIAA: 3× Platinum; ARIA: 3× Platinum; BPI: 7× Platinum; BVMI: Platinum; IFPI DEN: 4× Platinum; IFPI SWI: Platinum; MC: 2× Platinum; RMNZ: Platinum |
| FutureSex/LoveSounds | Released: September 12, 2006; Label: Jive, Zomba; Formats: CD, CD/DVD, LP, digital download, streaming | 1 | 1 | 1 | 3 | 3 | 1 | 4 | 4 | 2 | 1 | US: 4,720,000; UK: 1,200,000 (Note: United Kingdom sales figures for FutureSex/LoveSounds as of June 7, 2013.) | RIAA: 7× Platinum; ARIA: 6× Platinum; BPI: 4× Platinum; BVMI: 2× Platinum; IRMA: 6× Platinum; IFPI DEN: 7× Platinum; IFPI SWI: 2× Platinum; MC: 7× Platinum; RMNZ: 6× Platinum |
| The 20/20 Experience | Released: March 19, 2013; Label: RCA; Formats: CD, LP, digital download, streaming | 1 | 1 | 1 | 2 | 1 | 1 | 2 | 1 | 1 | 1 | US: 3,743,000; UK: 315,000 (Note: United Kingdom sales figures for The 20/20 Experience as of September 20, 2013.) | RIAA: 2× Platinum; ARIA: Platinum; BPI: Platinum; BVMI: Gold; IRMA: Gold; IFPI DEN: Platinum; IFPI SWI: Gold; MC: 2× Platinum; RMNZ: 2× Platinum |
| The 20/20 Experience – 2 of 2 | Released: September 30, 2013; Label: RCA; Formats: CD, LP, digital download, streaming | 1 | 4 | 1 | 2 | 4 | 3 | 4 | 3 | 2 | 2 | US: 1,137,000 | RIAA: Platinum; ARIA: Gold; BPI: Gold; MC: Platinum |
| Man of the Woods | Released: February 2, 2018; Label: RCA; Formats: CD, LP, digital download, streaming | 1 | 2 | 1 | 1 | 1 | 3 | 1 | 3 | 2 | 2 | US: 422,000 | RIAA: Platinum; BPI: Silver; IFPI DEN: Gold; MC: Gold; RMNZ: Gold |
| Everything I Thought It Was | Released: March 15, 2024; Label: RCA; Formats: CD, LP, digital download, streaming | 4 | 23 | 17 | 13 | 5 | 48 | 3 | 25 | 5 | 5 | US: 41,000 | |

=== Compilation albums ===
List of compilation albums, with selected chart positions, sales figures and certifications
| Title | Album details | Peak chart positions | | | | | Sales | Certifications |
| Title | Album details | AUS | DEN | NL | NZ | UK | Sales | Certifications |
|---|---|---|---|---|---|---|---|---|
| 12" Masters – The Essential Mixes | Released: September 17, 2010; Label: Jive; Formats: CD, digital download, streaming | — | — | — | — | — | | |
| The 20/20 Experience – The Complete Experience | Released: September 27, 2013; Label: RCA; Formats: CD, LP, digital download, streaming | 46 | 7 | 30 | 22 | 27 | US: 1,100,000 (Note: United States sales figures for The 20/20 Experience – 2 of 2 and The 20/20 Experience – The Complete Experience as of April 28, 2016. The sales for both releases are combined.) | ARIA: Gold; BPI: Silver |
"—" denotes a recording that did not chart in that territory.

=== Soundtrack albums ===
List of soundtrack albums, with selected chart positions and certifications
| Title | Album details | Peak chart positions | | | | | | Sales | Certifications |
| Title | Album details | US | AUS | CAN | NZ | SWI | UK | Sales | Certifications |
|---|---|---|---|---|---|---|---|---|---|
| Trolls: Original Motion Picture Soundtrack | Released: September 23, 2016; Label: RCA; Formats: CD, LP, digital download, streaming | 3 | 1 | 7 | 4 | 40 | 4 | US: 865,000 | RIAA: 2× Platinum; ARIA: Platinum; BPI: Platinum; IFPI DEN: Gold; MC: 2× Platinum; RMNZ: Gold |
| The Book of Love: Original Motion Picture Soundtrack | Released: January 13, 2017; Label: Tennman Films II; Formats: Digital download, streaming | — | — | — | — | — | — | | |
| Trolls World Tour: Original Motion Picture Soundtrack | Released: March 13, 2020; Label: RCA; Formats: CD, digital download, streaming | 15 | 66 | 33 | — | — | — | | |
| Trolls Band Together: Original Motion Picture Soundtrack | Released: October 20, 2023; Label: RCA; Formats: CD, digital download, streaming | 43 | 48 | 73 | 17 | — | 3 | | |
"—" denotes a recording that did not chart in that territory.

== Extended plays ==
List of extended plays
| Title | Details |
|---|---|
| Justin & Christina (with Christina Aguilera) | Released: July 1, 2003; Label: RCA, BMG, Jive; Format: CD |
| I'm Lovin' It | Released: December 16, 2003; Label: Jive; Format: Digital download, streaming |
| iTunes Festival: London 2013 | Released: December 15, 2013; Label: RCA; Format: Digital download, streaming |

== Singles ==
=== As lead artist ===
List of singles as lead artist, with selected chart positions and certifications, showing year released and album name
| Title | Year | Peak chart positions | | | | | | | | | | Certifications | Album |
| Title | Year | US | AUS | CAN | DEN | GER | IRE | NL | NZ | SWI | UK | Certifications | Album |
|---|---|---|---|---|---|---|---|---|---|---|---|---|---|
| "Like I Love You" | 2002 | 11 | 8 | 11 | 4 | 16 | 5 | 5 | 6 | 14 | 2 | ARIA: Platinum; BPI: Platinum; RMNZ: Gold | Justified |
| "Cry Me a River" | 2002 | 3 | 2 | 2 | 11 | 13 | 6 | 6 | 11 | 20 | 2 | ARIA: 2× Platinum; BPI: 2× Platinum; BVMI: Gold; IFPI DEN: Gold; RMNZ: 3× Platinum | Justified |
| "Rock Your Body" | 2003 | 5 | 1 | 5 | 3 | 25 | 4 | 6 | 4 | 34 | 2 | RIAA: Gold; ARIA: 2× Platinum; BPI: 2× Platinum; IFPI DEN: Gold; RMNZ: 4× Platinum | Justified |
| "Señorita" | 2003 | 27 | 6 | 19 | 13 | 51 | 15 | 26 | 4 | 42 | 13 | ARIA: Platinum; BPI: Silver; IFPI DEN: Gold; RMNZ: Platinum | Justified |
| "Still on My Brain" | 2003 | — | — | — | — | — | — | — | — | — | — | | Justified |
| "I'm Lovin' It" | 2003 | — | — | — | — | 50 | 15 | 27 | — | 47 | 79 | | Live from London |
| "SexyBack" | 2006 | 1 | 1 | 1 | 2 | 1 | 1 | 7 | 1 | 2 | 1 | RIAA: Diamond; ARIA: 5× Platinum; BPI: 3× Platinum; BVMI: Platinum; IFPI DEN: Gold; IFPI SWI: Platinum; MC: 3× Platinum; RMNZ: 4× Platinum | FutureSex/LoveSounds |
| "My Love" (featuring T.I.) | 2006 | 1 | 3 | 1 | 3 | 4 | 4 | 19 | 1 | 2 | 2 | RIAA: Platinum; ARIA: 2× Platinum; BPI: Platinum; BVMI: Gold; RMNZ: 4× Platinum | FutureSex/LoveSounds |
| "What Goes Around... Comes Around" | 2006 | 1 | 3 | 3 | 3 | 5 | 6 | 13 | 3 | 5 | 4 | RIAA: Platinum; ARIA: 2× Platinum; BPI: Platinum; BVMI: Platinum; IFPI DEN: Gold; IFPI SWI: Platinum; MC: Platinum; RMNZ: 2× Platinum | FutureSex/LoveSounds |
| "Summer Love" | 2007 | 6 | — (Note: "Summer Love" did not enter the ARIA Singles Chart, but peaked at number 14 on the ARIA Digital Track Chart.) | 8 | — | 39 | — | — | 15 | — | — | RIAA: Platinum; BPI: Silver; MC: Gold; RMNZ: Platinum | FutureSex/LoveSounds |
| "LoveStoned" | 2007 | 17 | 11 | 5 | 12 | 15 | 12 | 8 | 17 | 19 | 11 | RIAA: Gold; ARIA: Platinum; BPI: Silver; IFPI DEN: Gold; RMNZ: Gold | FutureSex/LoveSounds |
| "Until the End of Time" (with Beyoncé) | 2007 | 17 | — | — | 30 | 39 | — | — | 31 | — | — | RIAA: Gold; RMNZ: Platinum | FutureSex/LoveSounds |
| "The Only Promise That Remains" (with Reba McEntire) | 2007 | — (Note: "The Only Promise That Remains" did not enter the Billboard Hot 100, but peaked at number five on the Bubbling Under Hot 100 Singles chart.) | — | — | — | — | — | — | — | — | — | | Reba: Duets |
| "Follow My Lead" (with Esmée Denters) | 2008 | — | — | — | — | — | — | — | — | — | — | | Non-album single |
| "Hallelujah" (with Matt Morris featuring Charlie Sexton) | 2010 | 13 | — | 5 | 37 | — | 46 | — | 8 | — | 91 | | Hope for Haiti Now |
| "Suit & Tie" (featuring Jay-Z) | 2013 | 3 | 9 | 3 | 1 | 25 | 16 | 10 | 14 | 31 | 3 | RIAA: 2× Platinum; ARIA: Platinum; BPI: Platinum; IFPI DEN: Platinum; MC: 2× Platinum; RMNZ: Platinum | The 20/20 Experience |
| "Mirrors" | 2013 | 2 | 10 | 4 | 4 | 2 | 5 | 10 | 7 | 5 | 1 | RIAA: 2× Platinum; ARIA: 3× Platinum; BPI: 3× Platinum; BVMI: Platinum; IFPI DEN: 2× Platinum; IFPI SWI: Platinum; MC: 3× Platinum; RMNZ: 5× Platinum | The 20/20 Experience |
| "Tunnel Vision" | 2013 | — (Note: "Tunnel Vision" did not enter the Billboard Hot 100, but peaked at number 11 on the Bubbling Under Hot 100 Singles chart.) | 63 | — | — | — | 75 | — | — | — | 61 | | The 20/20 Experience |
| "Take Back the Night" | 2013 | 29 | 57 | 23 | 37 | 52 | 49 | 38 | — | 48 | 22 | MC: Gold | The 20/20 Experience – 2 of 2 |
| "TKO" | 2013 | 36 | — (Note: "TKO" did not enter the ARIA Charts, but peaked at number 24 on the ARIA Urban Singles chart.) | 28 | — | 71 | 51 | — | — | 68 | 58 | MC: Gold | The 20/20 Experience – 2 of 2 |
| "Not a Bad Thing" | 2014 | 8 | 10 | 9 | 16 | 62 | 38 | 46 | 5 | 29 | 21 | RIAA: Platinum; ARIA: Platinum; BPI: Silver; IFPI DEN: Gold; RMNZ: Platinum | The 20/20 Experience – 2 of 2 |
| "Love Never Felt So Good" (with Michael Jackson) | 2014 | 9 | 28 | 20 | 1 | 18 | 17 | 2 | 12 | 15 | 8 | RIAA: Platinum; BPI: Platinum; IFPI DEN: Gold; RMNZ: 2× Platinum | Xscape |
| "Drink You Away" | 2015 | — (Note: "Drink You Away" did not enter the Billboard Hot 100, but peaked at number nine on the Bubbling Under Hot 100 Singles chart.) | — | 85 | — | — | — | — | — | — | — | | The 20/20 Experience – 2 of 2 |
| "Can't Stop the Feeling!" | 2016 | 1 | 3 | 1 | 2 | 1 | 3 | 2 | 2 | 1 | 2 | RIAA: 4× Platinum; ARIA: 11× Platinum; BPI: 5× Platinum; BVMI: Diamond; IFPI DEN: 3× Platinum; IFPI SWI: 2× Platinum; MC: 6× Platinum; RMNZ: 8× Platinum | Trolls Official Movie Soundtrack |
| "Filthy" | 2018 | 9 | 27 | 5 | 24 | 42 | 22 | 53 | — (Note: "Filthy" did not enter the NZ Top 40 Singles Chart, but peaked at number two on the NZ Heatseeker Singles Chart.) | 34 | 15 | RIAA: Platinum; ARIA: Gold; BPI: Silver; MC: Platinum | Man of the Woods |
| "Supplies" | 2018 | 71 | — | 49 | — | 83 | — | — | — (Note: "Supplies" did not enter the NZ Top 40 Singles Chart, but peaked at number six on the NZ Heatseeker Singles Chart.) | 84 | 84 | | Man of the Woods |
| "Say Something" (featuring Chris Stapleton) | 2018 | 9 | 18 | 6 | 11 | 9 | 16 | 24 | 20 | 6 | 9 | RIAA: 3× Platinum; ARIA: 2× Platinum; BPI: Platinum; BVMI: Gold; IFPI DEN: Platinum; IFPI SWI: Platinum; MC: 2× Platinum; RMNZ: 2× Platinum | Man of the Woods |
| "Man of the Woods" | 2018 | 73 | — | 63 | — | 80 | — | 100 | — (Note: "Supplies" did not enter the NZ Top 40 Singles Chart, but peaked at number six on the NZ Heatseeker Singles Chart.) | 28 | 91 | | Man of the Woods |
| "SoulMate" | 2018 | — | — | 83 | — | — | — | — | — | — | — | | Non-album single |
| "The Other Side" (with SZA) | 2020 | 61 | 43 | 55 | — | 88 | 56 | 60 | — (Note: "The Other Side" did not enter the NZ Top 40 Singles Chart, but peaked at number two on the NZ Hot Singles Chart.) | 47 | 44 | RIAA: Platinum; BPI: Silver; RMNZ: Gold | Trolls World Tour Official Movie Soundtrack |
| "Stay with Me" (with Calvin Harris, Halsey, and Pharrell Williams) | 2022 | — (Note: "Stay with Me" did not enter the Billboard Hot 100, but peaked at number two on the Bubbling Under Hot 100 Singles chart.) | 78 | 51 | — | — | 15 | 35 | — (Note: "Stay with Me" did not enter the NZ Top 40 Singles Chart, but peaked at number two on the NZ Hot Singles Chart.) | — | 10 | ARIA: Gold; BPI: Silver | Funk Wav Bounces Vol. 2 |
| "Sin Fin" (with Romeo Santos) | 2022 | 100 | — | — | — | — | — | — | — | — | — | RIAA: 3× Platinum (Latin) | Formula, Vol. 3 |
| "Keep Going Up" (with Timbaland and Nelly Furtado) | 2023 | 84 | — | 63 | — | — (Note: "Keep Going Up" did not enter the German Top Singles Chart but debuted and peaked at number 2 on the German Trending Chart.) | — | — | — (Note: "Keep Going Up" did not enter the NZ Top 40 Singles Chart, but peaked at number nine on the NZ Hot Singles Chart.) | — | — (Note: "Keep Going Up" did not enter the UK Singles Chart, but peaked at number 26 on the UK Singles Downloads Chart.) | | Non-album single |
| "Selfish" | 2024 | 19 | 82 | 22 | — | 56 | 52 | 100 | — (Note: "Selfish" did not enter the NZ Top 40 Singles Chart, but peaked at number five on the NZ Hot Singles Chart.) | 45 | 29 | BPI: Silver; MC: Gold | Everything I Thought It Was |
| "No Angels" | 2024 | — (Note: "No Angels" did not enter the Billboard Hot 100, but peaked at number 19 on the Bubbling Under Hot 100 Singles chart.) | — | — | — | — | — | — (Note: "No Angels" did not enter the main Dutch chart but peaked at number 25 on the Dutch Tipparade.) | — (Note: "No Angels" did not enter the NZ Top 40 Singles Chart, but peaked at number 18 on the NZ Hot Singles Chart.) | — | — (Note: "No Angels" did not enter the UK Singles Chart, but debuted and peaked at number 54 on the UK Singles Downloads Chart Top 100 on March 22, 2024.) | | Everything I Thought It Was |
| "Drown" | 2024 | — (Note: "Drown" did not enter the Billboard Hot 100, but peaked at number 1 on the Bubbling Under Hot 100 Singles chart.) | — | — | — | — | — | — | — (Note: "Drown" did not enter the NZ Top 40 Singles Chart, but peaked at number 22 on the NZ Hot Singles Chart.) | — | — (Note: "Drown" did not enter the UK Singles Chart, but debuted and peaked at number 27 on the UK Singles Downloads Chart Top 100 on March 1, 2024.) | | Everything I Thought It Was |
"—" denotes items which were not released in that country or failed to chart.

=== As featured artist ===
List of singles as featured artist, with selected chart positions and certifications, showing year released and album name
| Title | Year | Peak chart positions | | | | | | | | | | Certifications | Album |
| Title | Year | US | AUS | CAN | DEN | GER | IRE | NL | NZ | SWI | UK | Certifications | Album |
|---|---|---|---|---|---|---|---|---|---|---|---|---|---|
| "Work It" (Nelly featuring Justin Timberlake) | 2003 | 68 | 14 | 13 | — | 16 | 11 | 16 | 17 | 59 | 7 | ARIA: Gold; RMNZ: Gold | Nellyville |
| "Signs" (Snoop Dogg featuring Charlie Wilson and Justin Timberlake) | 2005 | 46 | 1 | — | 3 | 3 | 2 | 6 | 4 | 5 | 2 | RIAA: Gold; ARIA: Gold; BPI: Platinum; BVMI: Gold; RMNZ: Platinum | R&G (Rhythm & Gangsta): The Masterpiece |
| "Dick in a Box" (The Lonely Island featuring Justin Timberlake) | 2006 | — | 61 | 82 | — | — | — | — | — | — | — | | Incredibad |
| "Give It to Me" (Timbaland featuring Nelly Furtado and Justin Timberlake) | 2007 | 1 | 16 | 1 | 3 | 3 | 2 | 8 | 2 | 6 | 1 | RIAA: 3× Platinum; BVMI: 5× Gold; BPI: Platinum; IFPI SWI: Platinum; MC: Platinum; RMNZ: 2× Platinum | Shock Value |
| "Ayo Technology" (50 Cent featuring Justin Timberlake) | 2007 | 5 | 10 | 12 | 3 | 7 | 3 | 19 | 1 | 2 | 2 | RIAA: 2× Platinum; ARIA: 3× Platinum; BPI: Platinum; BVMI: Gold; RMNZ: Gold | Curtis |
| "4 Minutes" (Madonna featuring Justin Timberlake and Timbaland) | 2008 | 3 | 1 | 1 | 1 | 1 | 1 | 1 | 3 | 1 | 1 | RIAA: 2× Platinum; ARIA: Platinum; BPI: Platinum; BVMI: Platinum; IFPI DEN: 2× Platinum; RMNZ: 2× Platinum | Hard Candy |
| "Dead and Gone" (T.I. featuring Justin Timberlake) | 2009 | 2 | 4 | 3 | 7 | 11 | 3 | 20 | 2 | 18 | 4 | RIAA: 5× Platinum; ARIA: Platinum; BPI: Gold; RMNZ: 2× Platinum | Paper Trail |
| "Love Sex Magic" (Ciara featuring Justin Timberlake) | 2009 | 10 | 5 | 6 | 7 | 12 | 4 | 41 | 6 | 11 | 5 | RIAA: Platinum; ARIA: Platinum; BPI: Gold; RMNZ: Gold | Fantasy Ride |
| "Carry Out" (Timbaland featuring Justin Timberlake) | 2009 | 11 | 58 | 7 | — | — | 3 | 37 | 15 | 80 | 6 | BPI: Gold; MC: Platinum; RMNZ: Platinum | Shock Value II |
| "Winner" (Jamie Foxx featuring Justin Timberlake and T.I.) | 2010 | 28 | — | 23 | — | — | — | — | 37 | — | — | | Best Night of My Life |
| "Love Dealer" (Esmée Denters featuring Justin Timberlake) | 2010 | — | — | — | — | — | — | 32 | — | — | 68 | | Outta Here |
| "Motherlover" (The Lonely Island featuring Justin Timberlake) | 2011 | — (Note: "Motherlover" did not enter the Billboard Hot 100, but peaked at number 23 on the Bubbling Under Hot 100 Singles chart.) | — | — | — | — | — | — | — | — | — | IFPI DEN: Gold | Turtleneck & Chain |
| "3-Way (The Golden Rule)" (The Lonely Island featuring Justin Timberlake and Lady Gaga) | 2011 | — (Note: "3-Way (The Golden Rule)" did not enter the Billboard Hot 100, but peaked at number 3 on the Bubbling Under Hot 100 Singles chart.) | — | — | — | — | — | — | — | — | — | | The Wack Album |
| "Role Model" (FreeSol featuring Justin Timberlake) | 2011 | — | — | — | — | — | — | — | — | — | — | | No Rules |
| "Fascinated" (FreeSol featuring Justin Timberlake and Timbaland) | 2011 | — | — | — | — | — | — | — | — | — | — | | No Rules |
| "Holy Grail" (Jay-Z featuring Justin Timberlake) | 2013 | 4 | 42 | 13 | 14 | 24 | 53 | 83 | 18 | 24 | 7 | RIAA: 6× Platinum; BPI: Platinum; BVMI: Gold; IFPI DEN: Platinum; RMNZ: Platinum | Magna Carta Holy Grail |
| "#WheresTheLove" (The Black Eyed Peas featuring Justin Timberlake as part of the World) | 2016 | — | 15 | — | — | 39 | — | — | — | 41 | 47 | | Non-album singles |
| "Believe" (Meek Mill featuring Justin Timberlake) | 2020 | 90 | — | — | — | — | — | — | — (Note: "Believe" did not enter the NZ Top 40 Singles Chart, but peaked at number 29 on the NZ Hot Singles Chart.) | — | — | | Non-album singles |
| "Better Days" (Ant Clemons featuring Justin Timberlake) | 2020 | 94 | — | — | — | — | — | — | — (Note: "Better Days" did not enter the NZ Top 40 Singles Chart, but peaked at number 34 on the NZ Hot Singles Chart.) | — | — | | Non-album singles |
| "3D (Remix)" (Jungkook featuring Justin Timberlake) | 2023 | — | — | — | — | — | — | — | — (Note: "3D (Remix)" did not enter the NZ Top 40 Singles Chart, but peaked at number 15 on the NZ Hot Singles Chart.) | — | — | | Non-album singles |
| "House Music" (Quavo featuring Justin Timberlake) | 2026 | — | — | — | — | — | — | — | — | — | — | | Qrömelife |
"—" denotes items which were not released in that country or failed to chart.

=== Promotional singles ===
List of promotional singles, showing year released and album name
| Title | Year | Peak chart positions | | | Album |
| Title | Year | US Bub. | NZ Hot | UK Dig. | Album |
|---|---|---|---|---|---|
| "Don't Slack" (with Anderson .Paak) | 2020 | — | — | — | Trolls World Tour |
"—" denotes items which were not released in that country or failed to chart.

== Other charted and certified songs ==
List of songs, with selected chart positions, showing year released, certifications and album name
| Title | Year | Peak chart positions | | | | | Certifications | Album |
| Title | Year | US | CAN | NZ Hot | UK | WW | Certifications | Album |
|---|---|---|---|---|---|---|---|---|
| "FutureSex/LoveSound" | 2006 | — (Note: "FutureSex/LoveSound" did not enter the Billboard Hot 100, but peaked at number 13 on the Bubbling Under Hot 100 Singles chart.) | — | — | — | — | | FutureSex/LoveSounds |
| "Release" (Timbaland featuring Justin Timberlake) | 2007 | 91 | 86 | — | 105 | — | | Shock Value |
| "Bounce" (Timbaland featuring Dr. Dre, Justin Timberlake, and Missy Elliott) | 2007 | 93 | — | — | 176 | — | | Shock Value |
| "Pusher Love Girl" | 2013 | 64 | — | — | 122 | — | | The 20/20 Experience |
| "Don't Hold the Wall" | 2013 | — (Note: "Don't Hold the Wall" did not enter the Billboard Hot 100, but peaked at number four on the Bubbling Under Hot 100 Singles chart.) | — | — | — | — | | The 20/20 Experience |
| "Strawberry Bubblegum" | 2013 | — (Note: "Strawberry Bubblegum" did not enter the Billboard Hot 100, but peaked at number six on the Bubbling Under Hot 100 Singles chart.) | — | — | 193 | — | | The 20/20 Experience |
| "Spaceship Coupe" | 2013 | — (Note: "Spaceship Coupe" did not enter the Billboard Hot 100, but peaked at number 25 on the Bubbling Under Hot 100 Singles chart.) | — | — | — | — | | The 20/20 Experience |
| "That Girl" | 2013 | — (Note: "That Girl" did not enter the Billboard Hot 100, but peaked at number three on the Bubbling Under Hot 100 Singles chart.) | — | — | — | — | | The 20/20 Experience |
| "Let the Groove Get In" | 2013 | — (Note: "Let the Groove Get In" did not enter the Billboard Hot 100, but peaked at number nine on the Bubbling Under Hot 100 Singles chart.) | — | — | — | — | | The 20/20 Experience |
| "Blue Ocean Floor" | 2013 | — (Note: "Blue Ocean Floor" did not enter the Billboard Hot 100, but peaked at number 17 on the Bubbling Under Hot 100 Singles chart.) | — | — | — | — | | The 20/20 Experience |
| "Dress On" | 2013 | — | — | — | 197 | — | | The 20/20 Experience |
| "Body Count" | 2013 | — | — | — | 147 | — | | The 20/20 Experience |
| "Brand New" (with Pharrell Williams) | 2014 | — (Note: "Brand New" did not enter the Billboard Hot 100, but peaked at number 24 on the Bubbling Under Hot 100 Singles chart.) | — | — | 104 | — | | G I R L |
| "True Colors" (with Anna Kendrick) | 2016 | — (Note: "True Colors" did not enter the Billboard Hot 100, but peaked at number 11 on the Bubbling Under Hot 100 Singles chart.) | — | — | — | — | BPI: Gold; RMNZ: Platinum | Trolls: Original Motion Picture Soundtrack |
| "Morning Light" (featuring Alicia Keys) | 2018 | — (Note: "Morning Light" did not enter the Billboard Hot 100, but peaked at number 14 on the Bubbling Under Hot 100 Singles chart.) | — | — (Note: "Morning Light" did not enter the NZ Top 40 Singles Chart or the NZ Hot Singles Chart, but peaked at number five on the NZ Heatseeker Singles Chart.) | — | — | | Man of the Woods |
| "Just Be" (DJ Khaled featuring Justin Timberlake) | 2021 | — (Note: "Just Be" did not chart on the US Billboard Hot 100, but peaked at number 21 on the Bubbling Under Hot 100 chart.) | — | — | — | — | | Khaled Khaled |
| "Parent Trap" (Jack Harlow featuring Justin Timberlake) | 2022 | — (Note: "Parent Trap" did not chart on the US Billboard Hot 100, but peaked at number nine on the Bubbling Under Hot 100 chart.) | 73 | — | — | 198 | | Come Home the Kids Miss You |
| "Memphis" | 2024 | — | — | 40 | — | — | | Everything I Thought It Was |
| "Paradise" (featuring NSYNC) | 2024 | — (Note: "Paradise" did not enter the Billboard Hot 100, but peaked at number 20 on the Bubbling Under Hot 100 Singles chart.) | — | — | — (Note: "Paradise" debuted at number 62 on the UK Singles Downloads Chart Top 100 on March 22, 2024.) | — | | Everything I Thought It Was |
"—" denotes a recording that did not chart in that territory.

== Other appearances ==
| Title | Year | Album |
|---|---|---|
| "My Kind of Girl" (Brian McKnight featuring Justin Timberlake) | 2001 | Superhero |
| "What It's Like to Be Me" (Britney Spears featuring Justin Timberlake) | 2001 | Britney |
| "Hootnanny" (Bubba Sparxxx featuring Justin Timberlake) | 2003 | Deliverance |
| "Love Don't Love Me" (Justin Timberlake) | 2003 | Bad Boys II Official Movie Soundtrack |
| "Good Foot" (Justin Timberlake featuring Timbaland) | 2004 | Shark Tale Official Movie Soundtrack |
| "Floatin'" (Charlie Wilson featuring Justin Timberlake & will.i.am) | 2005 | Charlie, Last Name Wilson |
| "My Style" (The Black Eyed Peas featuring Justin Timberlake and Timbaland) | 2005 | Monkey Business |
| "Loose Ends" (Sérgio Mendes featuring Justin Timberlake, Pharoahe Monch, and will.i.am) | 2006 | Timeless |
| "Get Out" (Macy Gray featuring Justin Timberlake) | 2007 | Big |
| "The Nature" (Talib Kweli featuring Justin Timberlake) | 2007 | Eardrum |
| "Nite Runner" (Duran Duran featuring Justin Timberlake & Timbaland) | 2007 | Red Carpet Massacre |
| "Falling Down" (Duran Duran featuring Justin Timberlake) | 2007 | Red Carpet Massacre |
| "Can't Believe It (Remix)" (T-Pain featuring Justin Timberlake) | 2008 | Can't Believe It |
| "Dance 2night" (Madonna featuring Justin Timberlake) | 2008 | Hard Candy |
| "Take Me Alive" (Chris Cornell featuring Justin Timberlake) | 2009 | Scream |
| "G is for Girl (A-Z)" (Ciara featuring Justin Timberlake) | 2009 | Fantasy Ride |
| "Casanova" (Esmée Denters featuring Justin Timberlake) | 2009 | Outta Here |
| "Hole in My Head" (Rihanna featuring Justin Timberlake) | 2009 | Rated R |
| "Money" (Matt Morris featuring Justin Timberlake) | 2010 | When Everything Breaks Open |
| "Sign Your Name" (Sheryl Crow featuring Justin Timberlake) | 2010 | 100 Miles from Memphis |
| "Shades" (Diddy - Dirty Money featuring Lil Wayne, Justin Timberlake, Bilal and James Fauntleroy) | 2010 | Last Train to Paris |
| "Ain't No Doubt About It" (Game featuring Justin Timberlake and Pharrell Williams) | 2011 | |
| "The Woods" (Juicy J featuring Justin Timberlake and Timbaland) | 2013 | Stay Trippy |
| "Heaven" (JAY-Z featuring Justin Timberlake) | 2013 | Magna Carta...Holy Grail |
| "BBC" (JAY-Z featuring Nas, Timbaland, Pharrell Williams, Swizz Beatz, Justin Timberlake, Nigo, Beyoncé Knowles) | 2013 | Magna Carta...Holy Grail |
| "Five Hundred Miles" (Justin Timberlake, Carey Mulligan & Stark Sands) | 2013 | Inside Llewyn Davis |
| "Please Mr. Kennedy" (Oscar Isaac, Justin Timberlake & Adam Driver) | 2013 | Inside Llewyn Davis |
| "The Auld Triangle" (Chris Thile, Chris Eldridge, Justin Timberlake, Marcus Mumford & Gabe Witcher) | 2013 | Inside Llewyn Davis |
| "Brand New" (Pharrell Williams featuring Justin Timberlake) | 2014 | G I R L |
| "Incredible Thoughts" (The Lonely Island featuring Michael Bolton and Justin Timberlake) | 2016 | Popstar: Never Stop Never Stopping Official Movie Soundtrack |
| "Make it Right" (Foo Fighters featuring Justin Timberlake) | 2017 | Concrete and Gold |
| "Just Be" (DJ Khaled featuring Justin Timberlake) | 2021 | Khaled Khaled |
| "Innocent" (Justine Skye and Justin Timberlake) | 2021 | Space and Time |
| "Parent Trap" (Jack Harlow featuring Justin Timberlake) | 2022 | Come Home the Kids Miss You |
| "ICU (Remix)" (Coco Jones featuring Justin Timberlake) | 2023 | ICU |
| "You'll Be There" (Jimmy Fallon featuring Justin Timberlake) | 2024 | Holiday Seasoning |
| "House Music" (Quavo featuring Justin Timberlake) | 2026 | Qrömelife |

== Production discography ==
List of Timberlake's credits on albums by other artists
| Title | Performer(s) | Credits | Originating album | Year | Ref. |
|---|---|---|---|---|---|
| "What It's Like to Be Me" | Britney Spears | Writer, producer, background vocals | Britney | 2001 | |
| "Bring My Angel Down to Earth" | Prymary Colorz | Writer | If You Only Knew | 2002 | |
| "Where Is The Love?" | The Black Eyed Peas | Writer, additional vocals | Elephunk | 2003 | |
| "Good Foot" | Timbaland | Writer, main vocals, co-producer | Shark Tale Official Soundtrack | 2004 | |
| "Floatin'" | Charlie Wilson & will.i.am | Writer, additional vocals, co-producer | Charlie, Last Name Wilson | 2005 | |
| "My Style" | The Black Eyed Peas | Writer, additional vocals | Monkey Business | 2005 | |
| "Loose Ends" | Sérgio Mendes, Pharoahe Monch & will.i.am | Writer, additional vocals | Timeless | 2006 | |
| "The Only Promise That Remains" | Reba McEntire | Writer, guest vocals, co-producer | Reba: Duets | 2007 | |
| "Rehab" | Rihanna | Writer, producer, background vocals | Good Girl Gone Bad | 2007 | |
| "Nite-Runner" | Duran Duran | Writer, additional vocals | Red Carpet Massacre | 2007 | |
| "Falling Down" | Duran Duran | Writer, producer, additional vocals | Red Carpet Massacre | 2007 | |
| "The Nature" | Talib Kweli | Writer, background vocals, featured vocals | Eardrum | 2007 | |
| "Okay" | Macy Gray | Writer, producer | Big | 2007 | |
| "Get Out" | Macy Gray | Writer, producer, featured vocals | Big | 2007 | |
| "Miles Away" | Madonna | Writer, background vocals | Hard Candy | 2008 | |
| "Devil Wouldn't Recognize You" | Madonna | Writer, background vocals | Hard Candy | 2008 | |
| "Voices" | Madonna | Writer, background vocals | Hard Candy | 2008 | |
| "Take Me Alive" | Chris Cornell | Writer, additional vocals | Scream | 2009 | |
| "Don't Let Me Down" | Leona Lewis | Writer, producer, additional vocals | Echo | 2009 | |
| "Love Sex Magic" | Ciara | Producer, co-performer | Fantasy Ride | 2009 | |
| "G Is for Girl (A–Z)" | Ciara | Producer | Fantasy Ride | 2009 | |
| "Cold Case Love" | Rihanna | Writer | Rated R | 2009 | |
| "Heaven" | Jay-Z | Writer, additional vocals | Magna Carta Holy Grail | 2013 | |
| "BBC" | Jay-Z | Writer, additional vocals | Magna Carta Holy Grail | 2013 | |
| "JAY Z Blue" | Jay-Z | Writer, additional producer | Magna Carta Holy Grail | 2013 | |
| "The Woods" | Juicy J | Writer, additional vocals | Stay Trippy | 2013 | |
| "Blow" | Beyoncé | Writer | Beyoncé | 2013 | |
| "Partition" | Beyoncé | Writer, producer, background vocals | Beyoncé | 2013 | |
| "Rocket" | Beyoncé | Writer, background vocals | Beyoncé | 2013 | |
| "Hot Damn!" | The Shadowboxers | Writer, background vocals, co-producer | N/A | 2017 | |
| "Runaway" | The Shadowboxers | Writer, background vocals, co-producer | N/A | 2018 | |
| "Telephone" | The Shadowboxers | Writer, background vocals, co-producer | N/A | 2018 | |
| "Without Me" | Halsey | Writer (through interpolation) | Manic | 2018 | |
| "No Love Lost" | Keyshia Cole | Writer | The Color Purple (Music From and Inspired By) | 2023 | |

== See also ==
- Justin Timberlake videography
- List of songs recorded by Justin Timberlake
- NSYNC discography
