= Justin Timberlake videography =

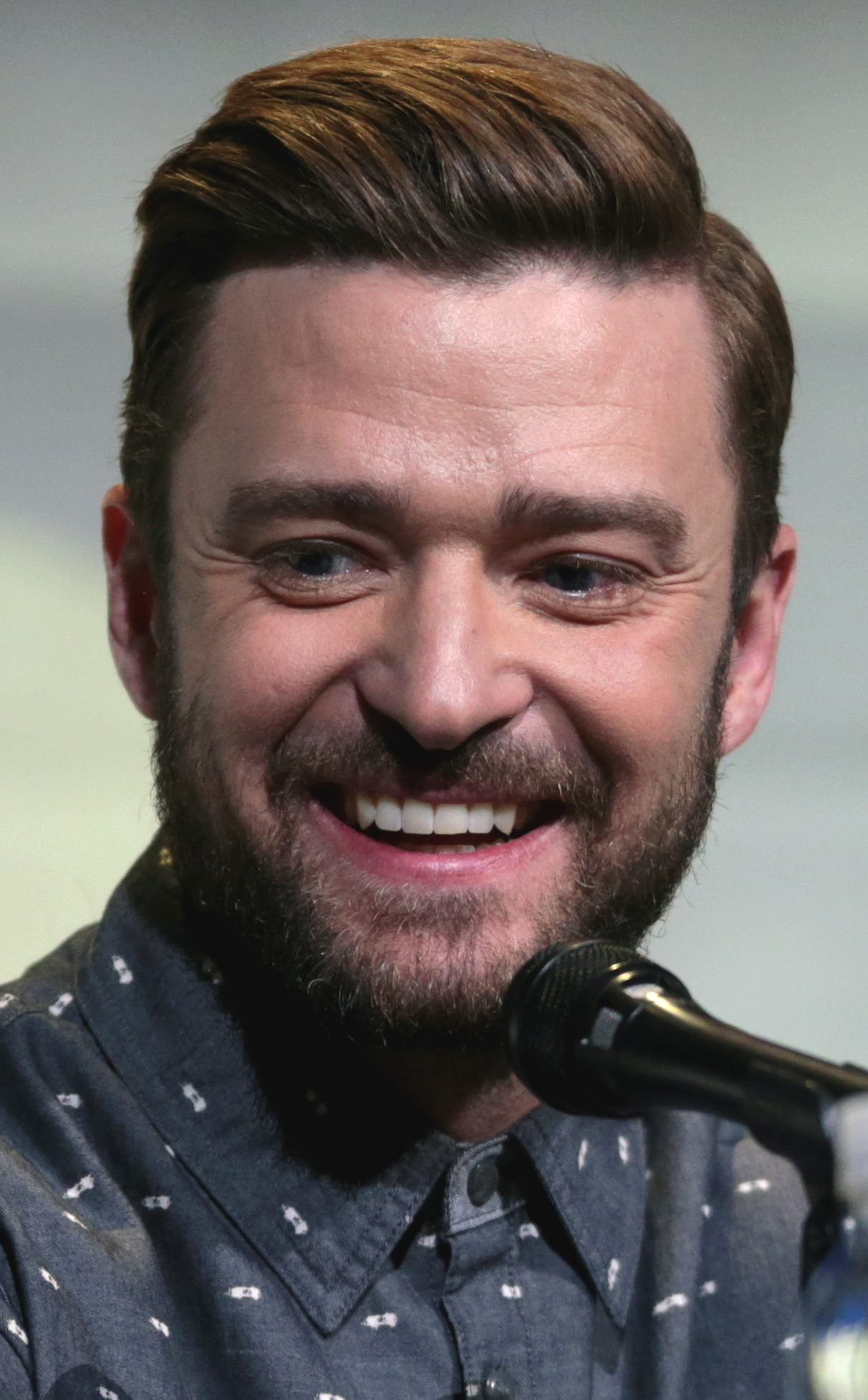
Timberlake at the 2016 San Diego Comic Con

American entertainer Justin Timberlake has released four video albums and has been featured in thirty-seven music videos, seventeen films, fifteen television shows, and six commercials. He achieved early fame when he appeared in the Disney Channel television series The All-New Mickey Mouse Club, alongside singers Britney Spears and Christina Aguilera and actor Ryan Gosling. Timberlake rose to fame in the late 1990s as the lead singer of the boy band NSYNC. In 2002, he launched his solo career and released his solo debut single "Like I Love You", the music video for which was directed by Bucky Chrome. Francis Lawrence directed the video for "Cry Me a River". The video features Timberlake's character as he spies on a former lover, who, according to the director, portrays his former romantic interest Spears. At the 2003 MTV Video Music Awards, the video won the accolades for Best Male Video and Best Pop Video.

In 2005, Timberlake starred in the thriller Edison alongside Morgan Freeman and Kevin Spacey. The film received negative reviews from film critics and was a box office bomb. He then portrayed Frankie Ballenbacher in the crime drama Alpha Dog (2006); it received mixed responses from critics and attained box office success. The same year, Timberlake released his second studio album FutureSex/LoveSounds—four music videos for singles from the album were shot. Samuel Bayer directed the music video for "What Goes Around... Comes Around" (2007) in which American actress Scarlett Johansson plays Timberlake's love interest. From 2007 until 2009, he appeared in the music videos for his collaborations with other artists including 50 Cent ("Ayo Technology"), Madonna ("4 Minutes") and T.I. ("Dead and Gone").

Timberlake starred in the 2010 drama The Social Network, in which he portrayed Sean Parker, the first president of Facebook. The film received acclaim from critics and was a box office success. In 2011, he starred in the comedies Bad Teacher and Friends with Benefits alongside Cameron Diaz and Mila Kunis respectively. Both films were financial successes. The music videos for his songs "Mirrors" and "Suit & Tie" were released in 2013. They earned him a MTV Video Music Award for Video of the Year and a Grammy Award for Best Music Video, respectively. Timberlake has also hosted Saturday Night Live five times, being both host and musical guest three times. In film, he released Justin Timberlake + The Tennessee Kids and voiced Branch in Trolls (2016) as well as its two sequels Trolls World Tour (2020) and Trolls Band Together (2023).

== Music videos ==
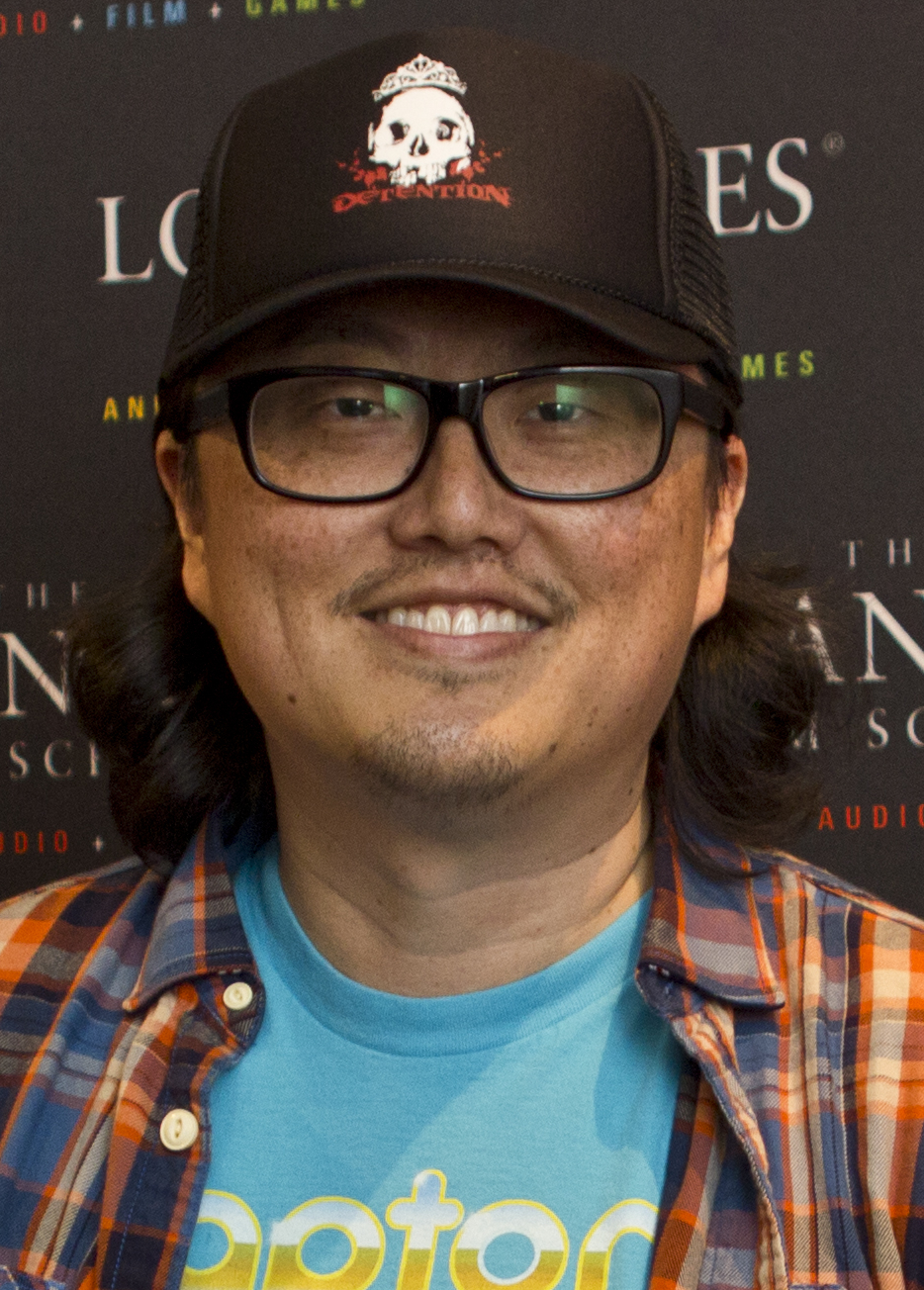
The music videos for "Work It" and "Ayo Technology" were directed by Joseph Kahn.

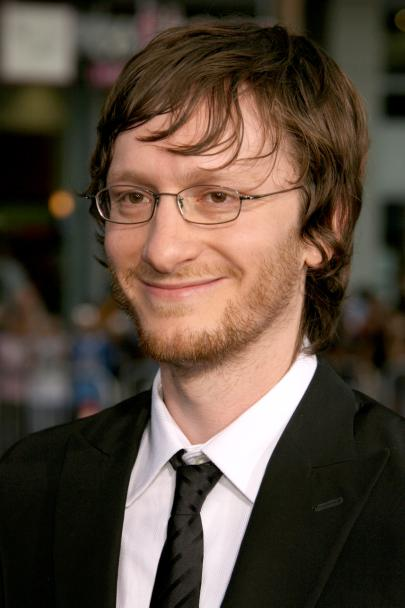
Akiva Schaffer directed the music videos for "Dick in a Box", "Jizz in My Pants", "Motherlover", and "3-Way (The Golden Rule)".

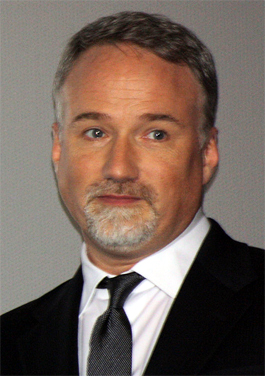
David Fincher directed the music video for Timberlake's 2013 single "Suit & Tie".

=== As a performer ===
| Title | Other performer(s) | Director(s) | Album | Year | Ref. |
|---|---|---|---|---|---|
| "Like I Love You" | Clipse | Bucky Chrome | Justified | 2002 | |
| "Cry Me a River" | —N/a | Francis Lawrence | Justified | 2002 | |
| "Work It" | Nelly | Joseph Kahn | Nellyville | 2003 | |
| "Rock Your Body" | —N/a | Francis Lawrence | Justified | 2003 | |
| "Señorita" | —N/a | Paul Hunter | Justified | 2003 | |
| "I'm Lovin' It" | —N/a | Paul Hunter | Live from London | 2003 | |
| "Signs" | Snoop Dogg & Charlie Wilson | Paul Hunter | R&G (Rhythm & Gangsta): The Masterpiece | 2005 | |
| "SexyBack" | —N/a | Michael Haussman | FutureSex/LoveSounds | 2006 | |
| "My Love" | T.I. | Paul Hunter | FutureSex/LoveSounds | 2006 | |
| "Dick in a Box" | The Lonely Island | Akiva Schaffer | Incredibad | 2006 | |
| "What Goes Around... Comes Around" (Paul van Dyk remix) | —N/a | Samuel Bayer | FutureSex/LoveSounds | 2006 | |
| "What Goes Around... Comes Around" | —N/a | Samuel Bayer | FutureSex/LoveSounds | 2007 | |
| "What Goes Around... Comes Around" (Short Version) | —N/a | Samuel Bayer | FutureSex/LoveSounds | 2007 | |
| "Give It to Me" | Timbaland & Nelly Furtado | Paul Allen & Timbaland | Shock Value | 2007 | |
| "LoveStoned/I Think She Knows (Interlude)" | —N/a | Robert Hales | FutureSex/LoveSounds | 2007 | |
| "LoveStoned (Justice Re-Mix)" | —N/a | Marty Callner | FutureSex/LoveShow: Live from Madison Square Garden | 2007 | |
| "Ayo Technology" | 50 Cent & Timbaland | Joseph Kahn | Curtis | 2007 | |
| "Falling Down" | Duran Duran | Anthony Mandler | Red Carpet Massacre | 2007 | |
| "4 Minutes" | Madonna & Timbaland | Jonas & François | Hard Candy | 2008 | |
| "Dead and Gone" | T.I. | Chris Robinson | Paper Trail | 2009 | |
| "Love Sex Magic" | Ciara | Diane Martel | Fantasy Ride | 2009 | |
| "Motherlover" | The Lonely Island | Akiva Schaffer & Jorma Taccone | Turtleneck & Chain | 2009 | |
| "Carry Out" | Timbaland | Bryan Barber | Shock Value II | 2010 | |
| "Love Dealer" | Esmée Denters | The Malloys | Outta Here | 2010 | |
| "Ain't No Doubt About It" | The Game; Pharrell | Diane Martel | —N/a | 2010 | |
| "3-Way (The Golden Rule)" | The Lonely Island & Lady Gaga | Akiva Schaffer & Jorma Taccone | The Wack Album | 2011 | |
| "Role Model" | FreeSol | Justin Timberlake, Joseph Toman, & Aaron Platt | No Rules | 2011 | |
| "Fascinated" | FreeSol & Timbaland | Colin Tilley | No Rules | 2011 | |
| "Suit & Tie" (Lyric Version) | Jay-Z | Laban Pheidias | The 20/20 Experience | 2013 | |
| "Suit & Tie" | Jay-Z | David Fincher | The 20/20 Experience | 2013 | |
| "Mirrors" | —N/a | Floria Sigismondi | The 20/20 Experience | 2013 | |
| "Tunnel Vision" | —N/a | Jonathan Craven, Simon McLoughlin, & Jeff Nicholas | The 20/20 Experience | 2013 | |
| "Take Back the Night" | —N/a | Jeff Nicholas, Jonathan Craven, & Darren Craig | The 20/20 Experience – 2 of 2 | 2013 | |
| "Holy Grail" | Jay-Z | Anthony Mandler | Magna Carta Holy Grail | 2013 | |
| "Take Back the Night" (Live from Hoboken Version) | —N/a | Marc Klasfeld | The 20/20 Experience – 2 of 2 | 2013 | |
| "TKO" | —N/a | Ryan Reichenfeld | The 20/20 Experience – 2 of 2 | 2013 | |
| "Not a Bad Thing" | —N/a | Dennis Liu | The 20/20 Experience – 2 of 2 | 2014 | |
| "Not a Bad Thing" (#NotABadLoveStory Version) | —N/a | —N/a | The 20/20 Experience – 2 of 2 | 2014 | |
| "Love Never Felt So Good" | Michael Jackson | Rich Lee & Justin Timberlake | Xscape | 2014 | |
| "Can't Stop the Feeling!" (First Listen Version) | Cast of DreamWorks Animation's Trolls | —N/a | Trolls | 2016 | |
| "Can't Stop the Feeling!" | —N/a | Mark Romanek | Trolls | 2016 | |
| "Filthy" | —N/a | Mark Romanek | Man of the Woods | 2018 | |
| "Supplies" | —N/a | Dave Meyers | Man of the Woods | 2018 | |
| "Say Something" | Chris Stapleton | Arturo Perez Jr. | Man of the Woods | 2018 | |
| "Man of the Woods" | —N/a | Paul Hunter | Man of the Woods | 2018 | |
| "The Other Side" | SZA | Daniel Russell | Trolls World Tour | 2020 | |
| "Don't Slack" | Anderson .Paak | Calmatic | Trolls World Tour | 2020 | |
| "Stay with Me" | Calvin Harris, Halsey, & Pharrell Williams | Emil Nava | Funk Wav Bounces Vol. 2 | 2022 | |
| "Sin Fin" | Romeo Santos | Emil Nava | Formula, Vol. 3 | 2022 | |
| "Selfish" | —N/a | Bradley Calder | Everything I Thought It Was | 2024 | |
| "No Angels" | —N/a | Ti West | Everything I Thought It Was | 2024 | |

=== Guest appearances ===
| Title | Performer(s) | Director | Album | Year | Ref. |
|---|---|---|---|---|---|
| "This Train Don't Stop There Anymore" | Elton John | David LaChapelle | Songs from the West Coast | 2001 | |
| "Promiscuous" | Nelly Furtado & Timbaland | Little X | Loose | 2006 | |
| "Rehab" | Rihanna | Anthony Mandler | Good Girl Gone Bad | 2008 | |
| "Jizz in My Pants" | The Lonely Island | Akiva Schaffer | Incredibad | 2008 | |
| "#WHERESTHELOVE" | The Black Eyed Peas | Michael Jurkovac | | 2016 | |

== Video albums ==
| Title | Album details | Ref |
|---|---|---|
| Justified: The Videos | Released: September 23, 2003; Label: Jive; Format: DVD | |
| Justin Timberlake: Live from London | Released: December 9, 2003; Label: Jive; Format: DVD | |
| Video Triple Play | Released: September 4, 2007; Label: Zomba; Format: Digital download | |
| FutureSex/LoveShow: Live from Madison Square Garden | Released: December 18, 2007; Label: Zomba; Formats: Digital download, DVD, Blu-ray | |

== Filmography ==
=== Film ===
| Year | Title | Role | Director(s) | Notes | Ref. |
|---|---|---|---|---|---|
| 2000 | Longshot | Himself | Lionel C. Martin | | |
| 2000 | Model Behavior | Jason Sharp | Mark Rosman | | |
| 2001 | On the Line | Makeup Artist | Eric Bross | Uncredited | |
| 2005 | Edison (Note: Also known as Edison Force in certain territories.) | Joshua Pollack | David J. Burke | | |
| 2006 | Alpha Dog | Frankie Ballenbacher | Nick Cassavetes | | |
| 2006 | Black Snake Moan | Ronnie Morgan | Craig Brewer | | |
| 2007 | Southland Tales | Private Pilot Abilene | Richard Kelly | | |
| 2007 | Shrek the Third | Arthur "Artie" Pendragon (voice) | Chris Miller & Raman Hui | | |
| 2008 | The Love Guru | Jacques "Le Coq" Grande | Marco Schnabel | | |
| 2009 | The Open Road | Carlton Garrett | Michael Meredith | | |
| 2010 | The Social Network | Sean Parker | David Fincher | | |
| 2010 | Yogi Bear | Boo-Boo Bear (voice) | Eric Brevig | | |
| 2011 | Bad Teacher | Scott Delacorte | Jake Kasdan | | |
| 2011 | Friends with Benefits | Dylan Harper | Will Gluck | | |
| 2011 | In Time (Note: Previously titled Now and I'm.mortal.) | Will Salas | Andrew Niccol | | |
| 2012 | Trouble with the Curve | Johnny Flanagan | Robert Lorenz | | |
| 2013 | Inside Llewyn Davis | Jim Berkey | Joel & Ethan Coen | | |
| 2013 | Runner Runner | Richie Furst | Brad Furman | | |
| 2013 | The Short Game | —N/a | Josh Greenbaum | Executive producer | |
| 2016 | Popstar: Never Stop Never Stopping | Tyrus Quash | Akiva Schaffer & Jorma Taccone | Uncredited | |
| 2016 | Justin Timberlake + The Tennessee Kids | Himself | Jonathan Demme | | |
| 2016 | Trolls | Branch (voice) | Mike Mitchell & Walt Dohrn | | |
| 2017 | Wonder Wheel | Mickey Rubin | Woody Allen | | |
| 2020 | Trolls World Tour | Branch (voice) | Walt Dohrn | | |
| 2021 | Palmer | Eddie Palmer | Fisher Stevens | | |
| 2023 | Reptile | Will Grady | Grant Singer | | |
| 2023 | Trolls Band Together | Branch (voice) | Walt Dohrn | | |
| 2024 | Piece by Piece | Himself (voice) | Morgan Neville | | |

=== Television ===
| Year | Title | Role | Creator(s) | Note(s) | Ref. |
|---|---|---|---|---|---|
| 1993–1994 | The All-New Mickey Mouse Club | Himself | Bill Walsh | Seasons 6–7 | |
| 1999 | Touched by an Angel | Street Performer | John Masius | Episode: "Voice of an Angel" | |
| 2000–2024 | Saturday Night Live | Himself (host/musical guest) | Lorne Michaels | 16 episodes | |
| 2001 | The Simpsons | Himself (voice) | Matt Groening | Episode: "New Kids on the Blecch" | |
| 2003 | Punk'd | Himself | Ashton Kutcher | 2 episodes | |
| 2003 | 2003 MTV Movie Awards | Himself (co-host) | —N/a | TV special | |
| 2007 | 2007 Kids' Choice Awards | Himself (host) | —N/a | TV special | |
| 2008 | 2008 ESPY Awards | Himself (host) | —N/a | TV special | |
| 2009 | The Phone | —N/a | Justin Timberlake | 6 episodes; executive producer | |
| 2011 | The Cleveland Show | Paul / Rallo's Booger (voice) | Seth MacFarlane, Mike Henry & Richard Appel | Episode: "Terry Unmarried" | |
| 2017 | Trolls Holiday | Branch (voice) | Joel Crawford | TV special | |
| 2021 | Trolls: Holiday in Harmony | Branch (voice) | Sean Charmatz & Tim Heitz | TV special | |
| 2022 | Candy | Deputy Steve Deffibaugh | Nick Antosca & Robin Veith | 2 episodes; uncredited | |

== Commercials ==
| Product/Brand | Year | Director | Ref |
|---|---|---|---|
| I'm Lovin' It (McDonald's) | 2003 | Unknown | |
| Pepsi | 2008 | Unknown | |
| 901 Tequila | 2010 | Justin Timberlake | |
| Givenchy Play | 2011 | Unknown | |
| Callaway Golf Company | 2012 | Justin Timberlake (creative director) | |
| Sauza 901 | 2015 | Unknown | |
| Bai Brands | 2017 | Unknown | |

== Web ==
| Series | Year | Role | Note | Ref |
|---|---|---|---|---|
| MrBeast | 2023 | Himself | Episode: $1 Vs $100,000,000 House! | |
