= Essential Mixes =

Essential Mixes may refer to:

- Essential Mixes, a 2010 remix album by Kylie Minogue
- Essential Mixes, a 2010 remix album by Justin Timberlake
- Essential Mixes, a 2010 remix album by Avril Lavigne
- Essential Mixes, a 2010 remix album by Luther Vandross
- Essential Mixes, a 2010 remix album by TLC
- Essential Mixes, a 2010 remix album by Toni Braxton
- Essential Mixes, a 2010 remix album by Usher
- Essential Mixes, a 2010 remix album by R. Kelly
- BBC Radio 1's Essential Mix, a weekly electronic music radio show hosted by Pete Tong
