= The Forget Tomorrow World Tour =

2024–2025 concert tour by Justin Timberlake

The Forget Tomorrow World Tour + JT Live 2025
- Tour by Justin Timberlake
- Location: North America; Europe; South America
- Associated album: Everything I Thought It Was
- Start date: April 29, 2024
- End date: July 30, 2025
- Legs: 5
- No. of shows: 121
- Supporting act: Andrew Hypes
- Attendance: 1.25 million (94 shows)
- Box office: $205.2 million (94 shows)

Justin Timberlake concert chronology
- The Man of the Woods Tour (2018–2019); The Forget Tomorrow World Tour (2024–2025)

The Forget Tomorrow World Tour was the seventh headlining concert tour by American singer-songwriter Justin Timberlake. His first tour in five years, launched in support of his sixth studio album, Everything I Thought It Was (2024), the tour began on April 29, 2024, in Vancouver, Canada, and concluded on February 24, 2025, in Saint Paul, Minnesota. It was immediately followed by an extension composed of festivals and one-off concerts termed "JT Live 2025" that began on March 21, 2025, at Lollapalooza Argentina and concluded on July 30, 2025, in Istanbul, Turkey.

== Background ==
While appearing on The Tonight Show Starring Jimmy Fallon on January 25, 2024, to promote his new single "Selfish" and to reveal the title of his sixth studio album Everything I Thought It Was, Timberlake also announced the tour. Tour dates were announced the next day. Five days later, due to demand, six additional dates were announced. Dates for the fall were added later. On February 23, 2024, European dates for the tour were announced. On May 20, 2024, nine additional dates were announced due to demand. On September 17, 2024, additional dates for 2025 were announced.

== Show ==
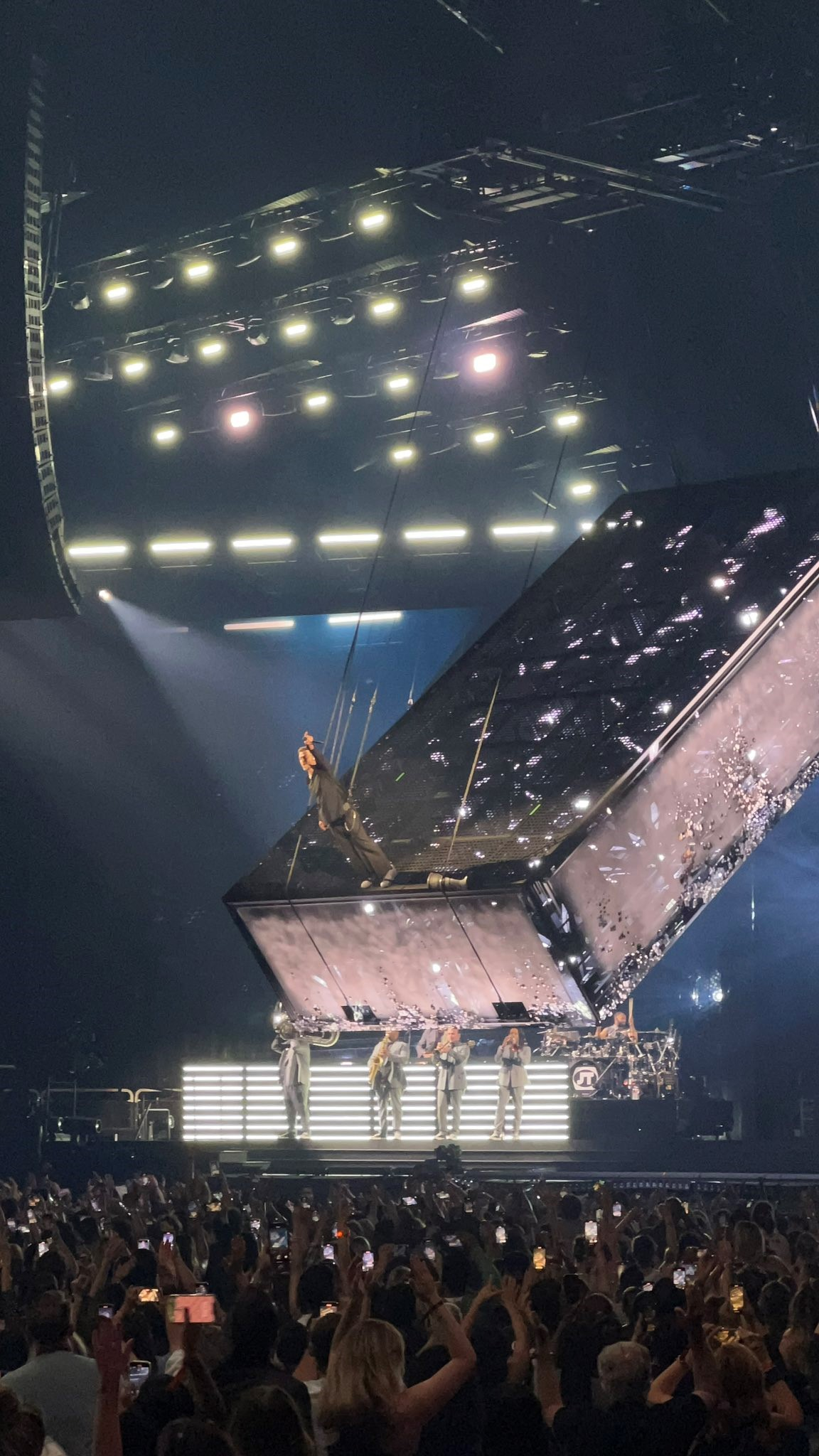
Timberlake on the floating stage

During a portion of the concert, Timberlake and his band, the "Tennessee Kids", make their way through the audience to a smaller stage at the back of the arena floor, performing eight songs at the "B Stage", including the single "Selfish". The concert concludes with Timberlake performing "Mirrors" on top of a floating, rotating stage. Held safe by wires attached to a harness at his waist and feet secured by straps to the deck, Timberlake rides the stage as it progresses above the crowd, turning from side to side in the arena. Toward the end of the song, as if bowing to the audience below, the stage angles forward in a way that tips Timberlake, his head extended well in front of his feet, almost onto the audience below. John Taylor of the Las Vegas Sun described the stage as "Maybe four stories tall and 20 feet wide. It began the night as part of the main backdrop on stage. It later moved out from its original position just behind the singer at the center stage, displaying various graphic designs and images of the singer. Later, it was lowered to where it hovered over Timberlake and his coterie of dancers as they moved through a song. [...] The floating stage literally was a show-stopper."

== Commercial performance ==
In March 2024, prior to the tour launching, Trace William Cowen of Complex reported that the Forget Tomorrow World Tour had become Timberlake's fastest-selling tour to date. They stated that the tour had amassed over $140 million in initial ticket sales globally from more than 70 dates, and that more than one million attendees are expected. Cowen concluded that "Justin Timberlake's Forget Tomorrow World Tour Is Set to Become His Biggest Yet." On May 20, 2024, Pollstar announced that nine additional shows were added due to "overwhelming demand" and reported that over 1 million tickets were already sold.

== Critical reception ==
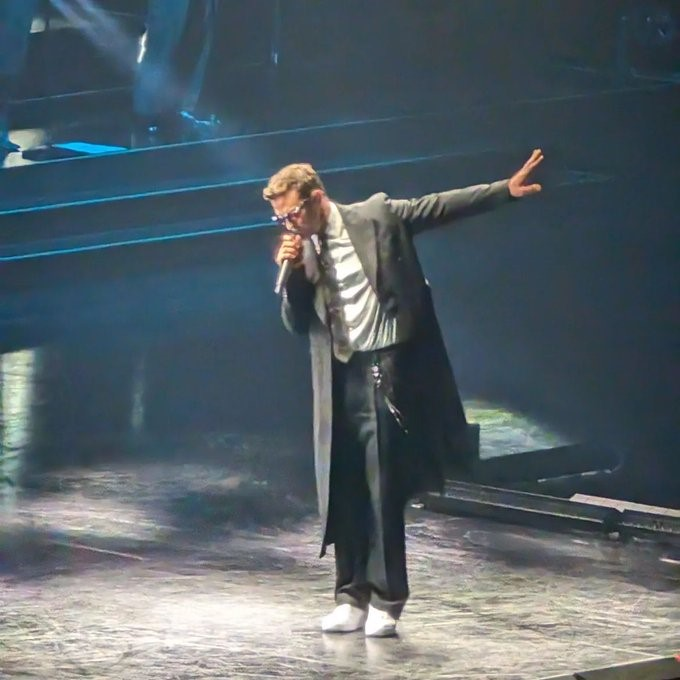
Timberlake performing in Seattle on May 2, 2024

The tour has received positive reviews from critics. Reporter Stuart Derdeyn of the Vancouver Sun, who attended the opening date, praised: "If you were at the launch of Justin Timberlake's Forget Tomorrow World Tour at Rogers Arena last night, you know you caught the best show the singer has ever played in Vancouver". Derdeyn concluded the tour put Timberlake "back in the star chamber for sure".

The Seattle Times music writer Michael Rietmulder also gave the tour a positive review, remarking that Timberlake was in his "element" and credited him as being "one of this century's most well-rounded entertainers". Jim Harrington of The Mercury News praised the performance aspect of the show, stating that "Timberlake is nothing short of a marvelous performer, boosting great dance moves, plenty of charisma and star power, an ability to connect deeply with a crowd, solid comedic timing and a knack for showing his fans a good time". Despite being critical of Timberlake's music catalog, he concluded that "the fact that these mostly mundane numbers worked in the moment, and evoked so much excitement from the crowd, is certainly further testament to Timberlake's prowess as a stage performer".

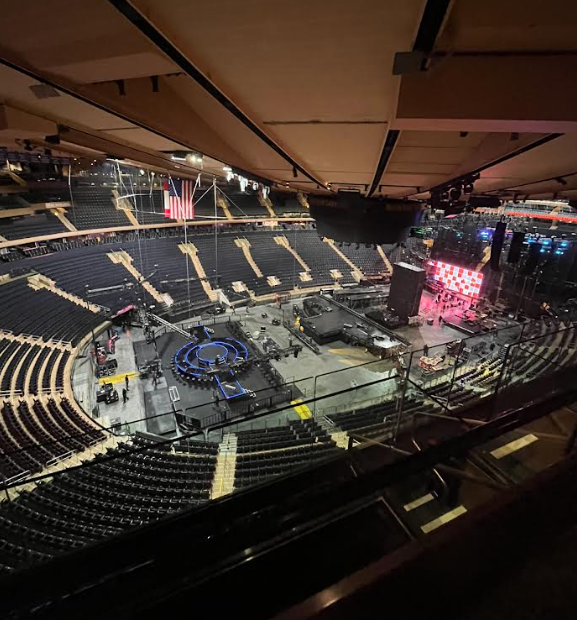
Madison Square Garden's stage being set up for the Forget Tomorrow World Tour on June 25, 2024

Las Vegas Sun editor John Taylor, besides praising Timberlake's performance, remarked that the "floating stage literally was a show-stopper. As splendiferous as the final act was, the rest of the show was equal to the task", concluding that it "caps an unforgettable Justin Timberlake concert".

Tim Chan of The Hollywood Reporter gave the tour a positive review, saying that "the singer thrilled fans with a setlist of greatest hits and new material that proves the Grammy-winning entertainer is here to stay". Variety music writer Steven J. Horowitz also gave a positive review and praised Timberlake, referring to him as "a consummate showman, educated in the school of boyband philosophy where precision is key. At 43 years old, Timberlake is just as sharp and exact as he's been throughout his decades-long career, hitting every cue and note with intent and purpose".

The Arizona Republic pop music critic Ed Masley described the tour as "an elaborate pop spectacle". He also remarked that "Timberlake's ageless falsetto hits all the right notes in hit-filled Phoenix concert". While describing Timberlake's dancing as "being just as impressive in a two-hour concert where Timberlake rarely stopped moving, occasionally standing still as he played an acoustic guitar or keyboard". In another positive review, Chris Stokes of the San Antonio Express-News said the performance "showcased his enduring talent and iconic status as a pop legend, captivating the audience and leaving them eagerly anticipating his next tour. The unforgettable moments and electrifying energy of the Forget Tomorrow World Tour solidified Timberlake's reputation as the 'Prince of Pop', ensuring an unforgettable experience for all in attendance".

Eric Webb of the Austin American-Statesman described the concert as "one of the most well-paced shows we can remember, the tempo perfectly ebbing and flowing with the mood". Dallas Observer writer Preston Jones who attended the show at Dickies Arena, praised: "the Grammy-winning singer-songwriter put on a master class in A-list pop craftsmanship, deploying seamless, occasionally eye-popping showmanship in service of R&B, gospel, funk and disco-kissed songs as sleek and supple as his falsetto". While Stefan Stevenson of the Fort Worth Star-Telegram also gave a positive review saying "Timberlake's night in Fort Worth proves again he's more than a popstar". Journalist Hunter Gilmore of the Atlanta Daily World praised Timberlake saying "'The Forget Tomorrow World Tour' is a testament to his staying power in the music industry and his ability to connect with fans on a deep, personal level. It is not just a celebration of Timberlake's past successes, but a reminder of his continued relevance and artistry in the present".

B96 Chicago left a positive review through Audacy for the Chicago tour date, describing it as "a testament to his [Timberlake's] enduring talent and ability to captivate audiences. It was a night filled with unforgettable moments for fans old and new, the tour was a memorable experience that celebrated both his enduring legacy and his continued evolution as an artist". Marc Hirsh of The Boston Globe gave praise, calling Timberlake "an effortless showman". Concluding that "Timberlake is showbiz and showbiz is Timberlake".

== Set lists ==
This set list is from the April 29, 2024, concert in Vancouver and used until the February 24, 2025, concert in St. Paul.

1. "Memphis" (Intro)
2. "No Angels"
3. "LoveStoned"
4. "Like I Love You"
5. "My Love"
6. "Technicolor"
7. "Sanctified"
8. "Infinity Sex"
9. "FutureSex/LoveSound"
10. "Imagination"
11. "Drown"
12. "Cry Me a River"
13. "Let the Groove Get In"
14. "My Favorite Drug"
15. "Señorita"
16. "Summer Love"
17. "Fuckin' Up the Disco"
18. "Play"
19. "Suit & Tie"
20. "Flame"
21. "Say Something"
22. "Pusher Love Girl"
23. "Until the End of Time"
24. "Selfish"
25. "What Goes Around... Comes Around"
26. "Can't Stop the Feeling!"
27. "Good Times"
28. "Rock Your Body"
29. "SexyBack"
30. "Mirrors"

=== Notes ===
- "Love & War" was performed at the July 4, 2024, show at Hersheypark Stadium.
- "New York, New York" was performed at Madison Square Garden.
- "Hotline Bling" was performed at Scotiabank Arena on October 18, 2024.
- "Gone" was performed at Kia Center on November 9, 2024.

The setlist below is from the "JT Live 25" shows starting on March 21, 2025, at Lollapalooza Argentina and used until July 30, 2025, concert in Istanbul.

1. "Mirrors"
2. "Cry Me a River"
3. "No Angels"
4. "LoveStoned"
5. "Like I Love You"/ "She Wants To Move" (N*E*R*D Cover)
6. "My Love"
7. "Sexy Ladies"
8. "Play"
9. "Señorita"
10. "Summer Love"
11. "Suit & Tie"
12. "Rock Your Body"
13. "Can't Stop The Feeling!"
14. "Selfish"
15. "What Goes Around....Comes Around"
16. "Holy Grail"
17. "TKO"
18. DJ Hypes Set: "Ayo Technology"/ "Chop Me Up"/ "Give It To Me"/ "4 Minutes"
19. "Let the Groove Get In"
20. "SexyBack"
21. "Until The End of Time"

== Tour dates ==
List of 2024 concerts
Date (2024)	City	Country	Venue	Attendance	Revenue
April 29	Vancouver	Canada	Rogers Arena	12,705 / 12,705	$1,781,057
May 2	Seattle	United States	Climate Pledge Arena	27,164 / 27,164	$5,374,367
May 3	Seattle	United States	Climate Pledge Arena	27,164 / 27,164	$5,374,367
May 6	San Jose	United States	SAP Center	21,508 / 21,508	$4,703,673
May 7	San Jose	United States	SAP Center	21,508 / 21,508	$4,703,673
May 10	Las Vegas	United States	T-Mobile Arena	27,360 / 27,360	$6,126,491
May 11	Las Vegas	United States	T-Mobile Arena	27,360 / 27,360	$6,126,491
May 14	San Diego	United States	Pechanga Arena	10,558 / 10,558	$2,319,370
May 17	Inglewood	United States	Kia Forum	28,801 / 28,801	$7,386,777
May 18	Inglewood	United States	Kia Forum	28,801 / 28,801	$7,386,777
May 21	Phoenix	United States	Footprint Center	12,600 / 12,600	$3,273,762
May 29	San Antonio	United States	Frost Bank Center	14,030 / 14,030	$2,564,512
May 31	Austin	United States	Moody Center	22,462 / 22,462	$5,616,927
June 1	Austin	United States	Moody Center	22,462 / 22,462	$5,616,927
June 4	Fort Worth	United States	Dickies Arena	11,579 / 11,579	$3,112,609
June 6	Tulsa	United States	BOK Center	12,494 / 12,494	$2,286,122
June 10	Atlanta	United States	State Farm Arena	12,982 / 12,982	$2,711,435
June 12	Raleigh	United States	PNC Arena	14,102 / 14,102	$2,744,869
June 14	Tampa	United States	Amalie Arena	14,483 / 14,483	$3,324,420
June 15	Miami	United States	Kaseya Center	12,815 / 12,815	$3,225,154
June 21	Chicago	United States	United Center	28,436 / 28,436	$7,153,033
June 22	Chicago	United States	United Center	28,436 / 28,436	$7,153,033
June 25	New York City	United States	Madison Square Garden	27,457 / 27,457	$7,691,734
June 26	New York City	United States	Madison Square Garden	27,457 / 27,457	$7,691,734
June 29	Boston	United States	TD Garden	26,708 / 26,708	$6,248,840
June 30	Boston	United States	TD Garden	26,708 / 26,708	$6,248,840
July 3	Baltimore	United States	CFG Bank Arena	11,694 / 11,694	$2,212,780
July 4	Hershey	United States	Hersheypark Stadium	27,278 / 27,278	$3,283,220
July 7	Cleveland	United States	Rocket Mortgage FieldHouse	16,285 / 16,285	$3,241,404
July 9	Lexington	United States	Rupp Arena	14,259 / 14,259	$2,711,174
July 26	Kraków	Poland	Tauron Arena	36,501 / 36,501	$4,004,056
July 27	Kraków	Poland	Tauron Arena	36,501 / 36,501	$4,004,056
July 30	Berlin	Germany	Uber Arena	25,964 / 25,964	$3,292,661
July 31	Berlin	Germany	Uber Arena	25,964 / 25,964	$3,292,661
August 3	Antwerp	Belgium	Sportpaleis	34,729 / 34,729	$3,640,421
August 4	Antwerp	Belgium	Sportpaleis	34,729 / 34,729	$3,640,421
August 7	Birmingham	England	Utilita Arena Birmingham	12,184 / 12,931	$1,587,924
August 8	Manchester	England	Co-op Live	15,090 / 15,090	$2,040,496
August 11	London	England	The O_{2} Arena	32,395 / 32,395	$4,445,313
August 12	London	England	The O_{2} Arena	32,395 / 32,395	$4,445,313
August 15	Amsterdam	Netherlands	Ziggo Dome	45,890 / 45,890	$5,334,012
August 16	Amsterdam	Netherlands	Ziggo Dome	45,890 / 45,890	$5,334,012
August 19	Amsterdam	Netherlands	Ziggo Dome	45,890 / 45,890	$5,334,012
August 21	Munich	Germany	Olympiahalle	25,097 / 25,097	$3,187,877
August 22	Munich	Germany	Olympiahalle	25,097 / 25,097	$3,187,877
August 25	Cologne	Germany	Lanxess Arena	33,086 / 33,086	$4,062,204
August 26	Cologne	Germany	Lanxess Arena	33,086 / 33,086	$4,062,204
August 29	Copenhagen	Denmark	Royal Arena	30,119 / 30,119	$4,473,987
August 30	Copenhagen	Denmark	Royal Arena	30,119 / 30,119	$4,473,987
September 2	Stockholm	Sweden	Tele2 Arena	21,334 / 21,334	$1,681,456
September 4	Hamburg	Germany	Barclays Arena	12,724 / 12,724	$1,683,431
September 6	Lyon	France	LDLC Arena	26,397 / 26,397	$3,196,570
September 7	Lyon	France	LDLC Arena	26,397 / 26,397	$3,196,570
October 4	Montreal	Canada	Bell Centre	14,231 / 14,231	$1,880,687
October 7	Brooklyn	United States	Barclays Center	12,616 / 12,616	$2,056,024
October 11	Philadelphia	United States	Wells Fargo Center	13,463 / 13,463	$2,298,547
October 13	Washington, D.C.	United States	Capital One Arena	13,467 / 14,085	$2,412,862
October 15 (Note: This concert was originally scheduled for October 8, 2024, but was postponed due to Timberlake suffering an injury.)	Newark	United States	Prudential Center	10,982 / 10,982	$1,850,769
October 17	Toronto	Canada	Scotiabank Arena	27,085 / 27,085	$3,301,325
October 18	Toronto	Canada	Scotiabank Arena	27,085 / 27,085	$3,301,325
October 21	Buffalo	United States	KeyBank Center	12,382 / 12,382	$1,797,810
November 8	Sunrise	United States	Amerant Bank Arena	11,746 / 11,746	$1,598,519
November 9	Orlando	United States	Kia Center	12,483 / 12,483	$2,406,752
November 12	Jacksonville	United States	VyStar Veterans Memorial Arena	9,865 / 9,865	$1,622,211
November 14	Charlotte	United States	Spectrum Center	13,389 / 13,389	$2,402,166
November 16	Atlanta	United States	State Farm Arena	10,897 / 10,897	$2,110,749
November 19	Knoxville	United States	Thompson-Boling Arena	13,007 / 13,007	$1,888,271
November 20	Louisville	United States	KFC Yum! Center	10,208 / 12,602	$1,509,612
November 23	Memphis	United States	FedEx Forum	11,924 / 11,924	$2,054,133
November 25	New Orleans	United States	Smoothie King Center	11,094 / 11,094	$1,311,060
December 4	Houston	United States	Toyota Center	11,561 / 11,561	$1,940,839
December 6	Dallas	United States	American Airlines Center	11,935 / 11,935	$2,272,738
December 8	Wichita	United States	Intrust Bank Arena	9,159 / 9,159	$1,461,896
December 10	North Little Rock	United States	Simmons Bank Arena	13,225 / 13,225	$2,203,561
December 12	Nashville	United States	Bridgestone Arena	13,613 / 14,164	$2,355,069
December 14	Pittsburgh	United States	PPG Paints Arena	12,303 / 12,303	$1,845,232
December 16	Indianapolis	United States	Gainbridge Fieldhouse	11,247 / 11,247	$1,642,855
December 19	St. Louis	United States	Enterprise Center	9,986 / 10,227	$1,369,513
December 20	Kansas City	United States	T-Mobile Center	12,786 / 12,786	$1,856,743

List of 2025 concerts
Date (2025)	City	Country	Venue	Attendance	Revenue
January 13	Portland	United States	Moda Center	9,644 / 10,363	$1,465,124
January 15	Sacramento	United States	Golden 1 Center	12,446 / 12,446	$1,569,592
January 18	Anaheim	United States	Honda Center	12,558 / 12,558	$2,029,654
January 20	Palm Desert	United States	Acrisure Arena	9,321 / 9,321	$1,260,777
January 23	Phoenix	United States	Footprint Center	10,155 / 11,464	$1,388,644
January 25	Salt Lake City	United States	Delta Center	10,315 / 10,315	$1,322,742
January 28	Denver	United States	Ball Arena	11,940 / 11,940	$1,495,491
February 3	Austin	United States	Moody Center	10,321 / 11,256	$1,151,601
February 7	Mexico City	Mexico	Palacio de los Deportes	33,372 / 39,046	$3,543,011
February 8	Mexico City	Mexico	Palacio de los Deportes	33,372 / 39,046	$3,543,011
February 14 (Note: This concert was originally scheduled for October 27, 2024, but was postponed due to Timberlake having bronchitis and laryngitis.)	Chicago	United States	United Center	14,590 / 14,590	$2,552,969
February 18 (Note: This concert was originally scheduled for November 2, 2024, but was postponed due to Timberlake having bronchitis and laryngitis.)	Grand Rapids	United States	Van Andel Arena	9,961 / 10,730	$1,542,514
February 20 (Note: This concert was originally scheduled for October 25, 2024, but was postponed due to Timberlake having bronchitis and laryngitis.)	Detroit	United States	Little Caesars Arena	12,438 / 12,438	$2,143,896
February 22 (Note: This concert was originally scheduled for October 28, 2024, but was postponed due to Timberlake having bronchitis and laryngitis.)	Milwaukee	United States	Fiserv Forum	11,682 / 11,682	$1,449,762
February 24 (Note: This concert was originally scheduled for October 31, 2024, but was postponed due to Timberlake having bronchitis and laryngitis.)	Saint Paul	United States	Xcel Energy Center	11,502 / 12,896	$1,077,035
Total				1,254,199	$205,166,893
JT Live 2025
March 21 (Note: This concert was part of Lollapalooza Argentina.)	Buenos Aires	Argentina	Hipódromo de San Isidro	—N/a	—N/a
March 22 (Note: This concert was part of Lollapalooza Chile.)	Santiago	Chile	Parque Cerrillos	—N/a	—N/a
March 28 (Note: This concert was part of Festival Estéreo Picnic.)	Bogotá	Colombia	Parque Simón Bolivar	—N/a	—N/a
March 30 (Note: This concert was part of Lollapalooza Brazil.)	São Paulo	Brazil	Autódromo de Interlagos	—N/a	—N/a
April 5 (Note: This concert was part of Pa'l Norte.)	Monterrey	Mexico	Fundidora Park	—N/a	—N/a
May 24 (Note: This concert was part of BottleRock Napa Valley festival.)	Napa	United States	Napa Valley Expo	—N/a	—N/a
May 30 (Note: This concert was part of the Icónica Santalucia series of concerts.)	Seville	Spain	Plaza de España	—N/a	—N/a
June 2 (Note: This concert was part of the I-Days Milano.)	Milan	Italy	Hippodrome of San Siro	—N/a	—N/a
June 6	Kaunas	Lithuania	Darius and Girėnas Stadium	—	—
June 9	Tallinn	Estonia	Tallinn Song Festival Grounds	—	—
June 12	Trondheim	Norway	Dahls Arena	—	—
June 14 (Note: This concert was part of the Heartland Festival.)	Kværndrup	Denmark	Egeskov Castle	—N/a	—N/a
June 17	Warsaw	Poland	PGE Narodowy	—	—
June 20 (Note: This concert was part of the Pinkpop Festival.)	Landgraaf	Netherlands	Megaland Park	—N/a	—N/a
June 22 (Note: This concert was part of the Isle of Wight Festival.)	Newport	England	Seaclose Park	—N/a	—N/a
June 26 (Note: This concert was part of the Belsonic.)	Belfast	Northern Ireland	Ormeau Park	—	—
June 28	Dublin	Ireland	Malahide Castle	27,500 / 27,500	$3,017,290
July 4 (Note: This concert was part of the Chelmsford City Live.)	Chelmsford	England	Chelmsford City Racecourse	—N/a	—N/a
July 5 (Note: This concert was part of the Lytham Festival.)	Lytham St Annes	England	Lytham Green	—N/a	—N/a
July 8 (Note: This concert was part of the Luxexpo Open Air series of concerts.)	Luxembourg	Luxembourg	Luxexpo The Box	—	—
July 12 (Note: This concert was part of the Lollapalooza Berlin.)	Berlin	Germany	Olympiapark Berlin	—N/a	—N/a
July 14	Vienna	Austria	Ernst-Happel-Stadion	—	—
July 17 (Note: This concert was part of the Electric Castle music festival.)	Bonțida	Romania	Bonțida Bánffy Castle	—N/a	—N/a
July 20 (Note: This concert was part of the Lollapalooza Paris.)	Paris	France	Hippodrome de Longchamp	—N/a	—N/a
July 23	Tbilisi	Georgia	Dinamo Arena	55,000 / 55,000	—
July 27	Baku	Azerbaijan	Baku Olympic Stadium	52,000 / 52,000	—
July 30	Istanbul	Turkey	ÏTÜ Stadium	—	—
Total				1,333,699	$208,184,183

=== Cancelled shows ===
List of cancelled concerts
Date (2024)	City	Country	Venue	Reason
June 8	Columbia	United States	Colonial Life Arena	—N/a
December 2	Oklahoma City	United States	Paycom Center	Back injury
February 27 (Note: This concert was originally scheduled for October 23, 2024, but was postponed due to Timberlake having bronchitis and laryngitis.)	Columbus	United States	Nationwide Arena	Flu
