= Let the Groove Get In =

Song by Justin Timberlake

from the album The 20/20 Experience
- Released: March 15, 2013
- Recorded: 2012
- Studio: Larrabee (North Hollywood)
- Genre: Latin
- Length: 7:11
- Label: RCA
- Songwriters: Justin Timberlake; Timothy Mosley; Jerome "J-Roc" Harmon; James Fauntleroy
- Producers: Timbaland; Justin Timberlake; Jerome "J-Roc" Harmon

"Let the Groove Get In" is a song by American singer Justin Timberlake from his third studio album, The 20/20 Experience (2013). Timberlake wrote and produced the song alongside Timbaland and J-Roc, with James Fauntleroy providing additional songwriting. The song became available as the album's eighth track on March 15, 2013, when it was released by RCA Records. A Latin song, "Let the Groove Get In" contains a sample from the recording "Alhamdulillaahi", a part of the field recording Explore Series: Africa-Burkina Faso: Rhythms of the Grasslands (2002).

"Let the Groove Get In" received positive reviews from music critics, who noticed its similarity to the works of Michael Jackson, in particular his 1983 single "Wanna Be Startin' Somethin'" and tracks from his fifth studio album Off the Wall (1979). In North America, the track peaked at number 9 on the US Bubbling Under Hot 100 and number 39 on the US Hot R&B/Hip-Hop Songs chart. In Asia, it peaked at number 31 on the Gaon Chart in South Korea.

== Background and chart performance ==
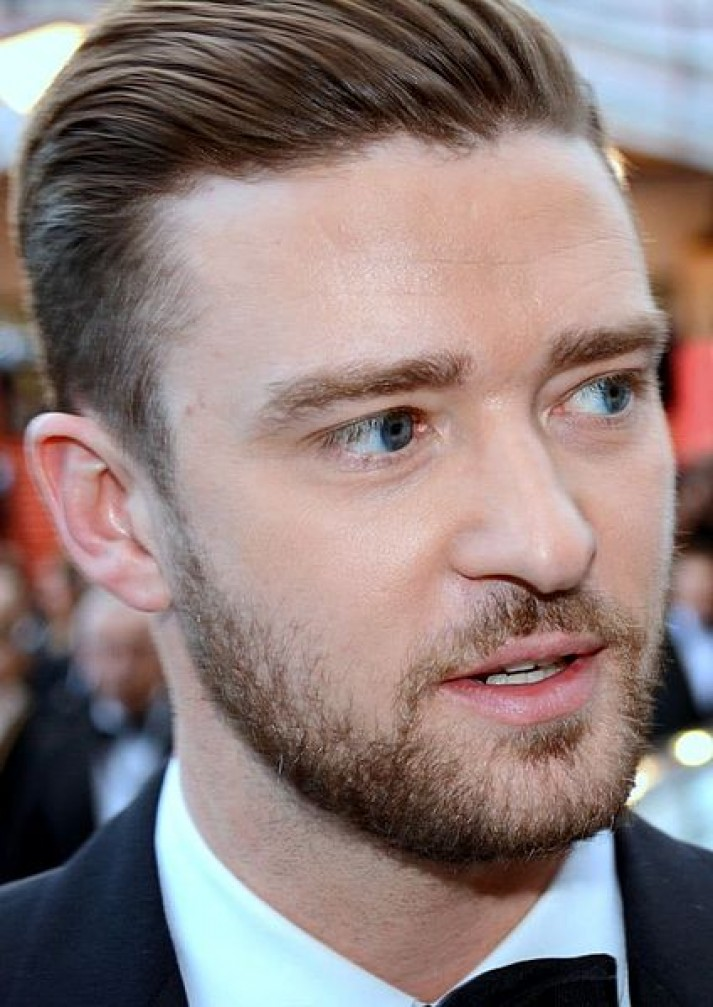
Timberlake in 2013

Timberlake started writing and recording for his third studio album in late May and early June and concluded in July 2012. The project was produced in a span of 20 days. In August 2012, producer Jim Beanz reported Timberlake had started work on his new music project. Shortly after the announcement, Timberlake's publicist denied plans for a new album, stating Timberlake was working on Timbaland's upcoming project, Shock Value III. Timberlake's project was originally planned for release in October 2012, but it was postponed because of his wedding to actress Jessica Biel. Timberlake's manager, Johnny Wright, stated that although Timbaland's project involved artists who were Timberlake's friends, keeping it a secret was difficult, so they used codenames.

Timberlake co-wrote and co-produced the song "Let the Groove Get In" with Timbaland and J-Roc, with James Fauntleroy providing additional songwriting. He released "Suit & Tie" as the lead single from the album, entitled The 20/20 Experience, on January 14, 2013. Timberlake announced the album's tracklist, which included "Let the Groove Get In" as the eighth track, on February 6, 2013. It became available for digital download on The 20/20 Experience, which was released on March 15. In North America, "Let the Groove Get In" peaked at number 9 on the US Bubbling Under Hot 100 and number 39 on the US Hot R&B/Hip-Hop Songs chart. In Asia, it peaked at number 31 on the Gaon Chart in South Korea.

== Composition ==
"Let the Groove Get In" is a Latin song accompanied by canned horns, propulsive percussion and Timberlake's harmonized voice over a pop arrangement made by Timbaland. It contains a sample from the recording "Alhamdulillaahi", a part of the release Explore Series: Africa-Burkina Faso: Rhythms of the Grasslands (2002), an album that features field recordings collected in Africa during the 1970s.

Melissa Maerz of Entertainment Weekly wrote that although the song is built on African hand-drum rhythms, it later transforms into a classical Michael Jackson song, similar to the tracks from his fifth studio album Off the Wall (1979). People's Chuck Arnold and Jody Rosen of Rolling Stone compared "Let the Groove Get In" to Jackson's 1983 single "Wanna Be Startin' Somethin'" from his sixth studio album Thriller (1982). Kitty Empire of The Guardian called the song a sassy and salsa-driven "earworm with a chanted chorus whose arrangements are sublime".

== Reception ==
Writing for ABC News, Allan Raible noted that "Justin feels like a singer standing still ... or coasting at best". Robert Christgau cited it as a highlight of the album. Billboard's editor Jason Lipshutz listed the song among a list of 15 pop songs "that weren't released as singles but should have been." VH1's Emily Exton wrote, "In addition to using a few of his more successful techniques (echoed call-and-response, general clapping) Timberlake dives into the sounds of the Miami Sound Machine, bringing back an electric dance number unlike anything else in his catalog."

== Live performances ==
Timberlake included "Let the Groove Get In" on the set list of his worldwide tour entitled The 20/20 Experience World Tour (2013–2015), and The Forget Tomorrow World Tour (2024–2025).

== Credits and personnel ==
Credits are adapted from the liner notes of The 20/20 Experience.

=== Locations ===
- Vocals recorded and mixed at Larrabee Studios, North Hollywood, California

=== Personnel ===
- Timothy "Timbaland" Mosley – producer, songwriter
- Justin Timberlake – Mixer, producer, songwriter, vocal producer, vocal arranger
- Jerome "J-Roc" Harmon – keyboards, producer, songwriter
- James Fauntleroy – songwriter
- Chris Godbey – engineer, mixer
- Jimmy Douglass – mixer
- Alejandro Baima – assistant engineer
- Elliot Ives – guitar
- The Benjamin Wright Orchestra – horns
- The Regiment – horns
- Terry Santiel — percussions

== Charts ==
Chart performance for "Let the Groove Get In"
Chart (2013)	Peak position
South Korea (Gaon)	31
US Bubbling Under Hot 100 (Billboard)	9
US Hot R&B/Hip-Hop Songs (Billboard)	39
