= Drown (Justin Timberlake song) =

- Promotional graphic

Single by Justin Timberlake

from the album Everything I Thought It Was
- Released: November 1, 2024
- Length: 4:20
- Label: RCA
- Songwriters: Justin Timberlake; Amy Allen; Henry Walter; Louis Bell; Kenyon Dixon
- Producers: Timberlake; Bell; Cirkut

Justin Timberlake singles chronology
"No Angels" (2024)	"Drown" (2024)

Lyric video
- "Drown" on YouTube

"Drown" is a song by American singer-songwriter Justin Timberlake. The track was released on February 23, 2024, as a promotional single from his sixth studio album, Everything I Thought It Was. "Drown" was made to be an instant gratification track for those who pre-ordered the album, but was also released for streaming. It impacted on Italian radio on November 1, 2024, as the album's third single.

== Promotion and release ==
Timberlake first teased "Drown" on February 19, 2024, with an Instagram video of him playing a snippet at the piano along with the caption, "So excited for new music and everything coming this week... Drown 2/23." He followed this on February 21, 2024, with a reel of himself working at a studio, with the song playing in the background. The song was released digitally worldwide on February 23, 2024, and released an official lyric video on the same day along with the announcement of the European leg of his The Forget Tomorrow World Tour. A lyric video was also released on February 22, 2024 and has received over 3 million views on YouTube as of April 2024. Timberlake performed the song on The Forget Tomorrow World Tour 2024-2025.

== Personnel ==
Credits adapted from the liner notes of Everything I Thought It Was.

- Justin Timberlake – vocals, songwriter, producer
- Amy Allen – songwriter
- Henry Walter – songwriter, producer
- Louis Bell – songwriter, producer
- Theron Thomas – songwriter
- Kenyon Dixon – songwriter

== Charts ==
Chart performance
Chart (2024)	Peak position
New Zealand Hot Singles (RMNZ)	22
UK Singles Downloads (Official Charts)	27
UK Singles Sales (OCC)	30
US Bubbling Under Hot 100 (Billboard)	1

== Release history ==
Release dates and formats
Region	Date	Format(s)	Label(s)	Ref.
Various	February 23, 2024	Digital download; streaming	RCA	
Italy	November 1, 2024	Radio airplay	Sony	
