= Keep Going Up =

Single by Timbaland, Nelly Furtado and Justin Timberlake

from the album Textbook Timbo
- Released: September 1, 2023
- Recorded: July 2023
- Genre: R&B; dance-pop
- Length: 2:54
- Label: Mosley; Def Jam
- Songwriters: Timothy Mosley; Nelly Furtado; Justin Timberlake; Kenyon Dixon; Edgar Ferrera; Jordan Hollywood; Brandon Stewart; Brandon Cordoba; Jennah Bayyan; Chris Gaspin; Khyelle Anthony; Chris Godbey
- Producers: Timbaland; SkipOnDaBeat; Last Trip to the Moon; CVRS

Timbaland singles chronology
"Home to Another One (Timbaland Remix)" (2023)	"Keep Going Up" (2023)	"Cowboy Capone" (2023)

Nelly Furtado singles chronology
"Eat Your Man" (2023)	"Keep Going Up" (2023)	"Gala y Dalí" (2024)

Justin Timberlake singles chronology
"Sin Fin" (2022)	"Keep Going Up" (2023)	"Selfish" (2024)

Visualizer video
- "Keep Going Up" on YouTube

"Keep Going Up" is a song by American record producer Timbaland, Canadian singer Nelly Furtado, and American singer Justin Timberlake. It was released on September 1, 2023, through Mosley Music Group and Def Jam Records. It marked their second collaboration following "Give It to Me" (2007).

== Background ==
Following multiple collaborations in the 2000s, such as for the 2006 album Loose, Nelly Furtado and Timbaland announced they were working on new music together for the first time in several years during an Instagram Live from the recording studio on July 18, 2023. Furtado said: "We're about to make music but we wanted to like chill and let you guys in on the action." They shared more media from the studio on social media creating hype among fans. The following week, Timbaland and his frequent collaborator Justin Timberlake shared photos of themselves in the studio while Furtado FaceTimed into the session which generated more buzz. Timbaland then confirmed the collaborative track by uploading a snippet on Instagram. It would follow the trio's first collaboration, "Give It to Me" (2007), which topped the charts in various countries.

== Production ==
Furtado talked about the reunion in interviews prior to its release, saying Timbaland and Timberlake had been working on music together for a year before they came up with the idea and wanted her "to woman the ship a little in my direction so they could feed off that." She stated "doing this song together feels very authentic and is a mini-miracle." She continued, "What's great about them is they're like, 'We want you to do your thing.' If the three of us are on a song, then we're all equals, and that's a really good feeling." "Keep Going Up" originated from Beatclub, a Timbaland-founded music creator platform, and its members, Last Trip to the Moon. Timbaland joined the group's production team members Brandon Stewart and Brandon Cordoba, who created the beat, for a session, and added his own elements. Musically, it is characterized as a R&B-leaning dance-pop track. Lyrically, the artists each take turns sharing updates on how they've been doing, with Timberlake and Furtado asserting in the chorus, "I keep goin', I keep goin', I keep goin' up."

Timbaland said the song was special to him, explaining, "I think we gave it a song with meaning. Meaning, it can relate to you or your friends. 'I keep going up, if you keep going up.' Like no matter what you go through, Imma be here for you." He revealed how the track happened "last minute", "This is all like happening in real time, like [Justin's] like on a plane listening to it. He’s like 'Whoa, this is it.' I'm the disruption that comes in when we come together. The pot gonna stir a little bit and I'm gonna know what direction to go when it comes to music." He disclosed his desire to create something nostalgic, "I want to create just a little window of nostalgia for this generation just to understand what greatness is. I feel like "Keep Going Up" is the song that loosens up the party, and make you have a drink," and teased more future collaborations between them, "We just tapped into something that we should've tapped into a long time ago. This song sparked off so much of an energy that life ain't promised to us, so let's not sit on an idea – let's just to do it." Furtado later called "Keep Going Up" a "continuation of the conversation" of "Give It to Me", reframing success as relative to one's own personal journey, rather than a competition. She added that the song “feels like a musical hug": "We've moved beyond the diss track. It's lighter on the diss, and heavier on the love."

== Release ==
On August 23, 2023, Timbaland announced the song would be released on September 1 with a teaser video, which he captioned "WE BACK". Timbaland confirmed its title, "Keep Going Up", with another social media clip from the moment he and Timberlake called Furtado to show her the final mix of the track. It was also announced Timbaland and Timberlake would work with ESPN to curate music for select Monday Night Football games starting with "Keep Going Up" for the first week. Timbaland then shared a behind the scenes video that depicted the making of the song which was intended to preview his upcoming EP release Textbook Timbo.

== Critical reception ==
Jason Lipshutz of Billboard described the track as "a rhythmic vocal showcase from consummate professionals out to prove that they're aging like fine wine," claiming that, "fortunately, the process of hearing these three voices reflect off one another again is both a nostalgia rush and an absorbing new pop experience." Vulture's Jennifer Zhan wrote that "the sound stirs up some nostalgia for the 2000s" and "if you believe in manifestation affirmations, the lyrics are perfect source material — you're cutting people off, finding a better love, and not buckling under pressure." Writing for NME, Charlotte Krol called it "a sprightly new single that's typical of Timbaland's signature rhythm-focused and rich R&B production," while Megan LaPierre from Exclaim! compared it to their previous collaboration stating that it "is more of a confident, self-love 'look-how-far-we've-come' anthem than the shit-talking braggadocio of "Give It to Me," and it's got some signature Timbaland flair in the buzzy production," concluding, "Furtado and Timberlake sound pretty good on it!"

== Personnel ==
Credits adapted from YouTube.

- Timbaland – vocals, songwriter, producer
- Nelly Furtado – vocals, songwriter
- Justin Timberlake – vocals, songwriter, co-producer
- Brandon Cordoba (Last Trip to the Moon) – songwriter, producer
- Brandon Stewart (Last Trip to the Moon) – songwriter, producer
- Edgar Ferrera (SkipOnDaBeat) – songwriter, producer
- CVRS – co-producer, engineer
- Chris Godbey – songwriter, engineer, mixing engineer
- Chris Gaspin – songwriter
- Jennah Bayyan – songwriter
- Jordan Hollywood – songwriter
- Kenyon Dixon – songwriter
- Khyelle Anthony – songwriter
- Bernie Grundman – mastering engineer

== Charts ==
Chart performance for "Keep Going Up"
Chart (2023–2024)	Peak position
Australia Airplay (AirCheck)	17
Bolivia Anglo (Monitor Latino)	8
Canada Hot 100 (Billboard)	63
Canada CHR/Top 40 (Billboard)	29
Canada Hot AC (Billboard)	23
Croatia (HRT)	41
France (Club 40)	20
Germany Download (Official German Charts)	5
Germany Trending (Official German Charts)	2
Israel (Media Forest)	10
Japan Hot Overseas (Billboard Japan)	11
Latvia (EHR)	23
Lebanon (Lebanese Top 20)	6
Netherlands (Tipparade)	22
New Zealand Hot Singles (RMNZ)	9
Slovakia Airplay (ČNS IFPI)	56
Sweden Heatseeker (Sverigetopplistan)	2
UK Airplay (Radiomonitor)	24
UK Singles Downloads (Official Charts)	26
US Billboard Hot 100	84
US Adult Contemporary (Billboard)	25
US Adult Pop Airplay (Billboard)	14
US Pop Airplay (Billboard)	20
US Rhythmic Airplay (Billboard)	30

== Release history ==
Release dates and formats for "Keep Going Up"
Region	Date	Format(s)	Label	Ref.
Various	September 1, 2023	Digital download; streaming	Mosley; Def Jam	
United States	September 5, 2023	Contemporary hit radio; rhythmic contemporary radio	Mosley; Def Jam	
