= Selfish (Justin Timberlake song) =

2024 single by Justin Timberlake

- Promotional graphic

Single by Justin Timberlake

from the album Everything I Thought It Was
- Released: January 25, 2024
- Genre: Pop; R&B
- Length: 3:49
- Label: RCA
- Songwriters: Justin Timberlake; Amy Allen; Henry Walter; Louis Bell; Theron Thomas
- Producers: Timberlake; Bell; Cirkut

Justin Timberlake singles chronology
"3D" (Remix) (2023)	"Selfish" (2024)	"Drown" (2024)

Music video
- "Selfish" on YouTube

"Selfish" is a song by American singer-songwriter Justin Timberlake. Released on January 25, 2024, it is his first solo single release in almost six years, following his standalone July 2018 single "SoulMate". It is the lead single from his sixth studio album, Everything I Thought It Was. It was followed shortly after by a promotional single, "Drown", in late February.

== Background and release ==
In 2023, Timberlake reunited with former members of his band, NSYNC, and released the single "Better Place" in support of the Trolls Band Together soundtrack, and a collaboration with Timbaland and Nelly Furtado titled "Keep Going Up". Timberlake had also collaborated with Romeo Santos on the song "Sin Fin", with Jack Harlow on the song "Parent Trap" for Harlow's album Come Home the Kids Miss You, a remix of Coco Jones' song "ICU", and a further remix of the song "3D" by Jungkook. Timberlake had also worked with Calvin Harris, alongside Pharrell Williams and Halsey, on Harris's song "Stay with Me".

On January 25, 2024, Timberlake appeared on The Tonight Show Starring Jimmy Fallon. He announced the release of "Selfish" and revealed that the parent album Everything I Thought It Was had taken four years to produce.

== Composition ==
The song was written by Timberlake, Amy Allen, Henry Walter, Theron Thomas, and Louis Bell. The song was produced by Timberlake, Cirkut, and Bell.

In an Apple Music 1 interview, the singer explained that the songwriting process of the single started with his music director Adam Blackstone singing "Jealous Guy" by Donny Hathaway. During the process, Timberlake reflected that men usually do not sing about "an emotion that makes them vulnerable".

== Critical reception ==
Billboard compared the track to Timberlake's previous lead singles saying it "is actually much more unassuming" describing it as "a honeyed, ornately produced mid-tempo ballad built on warmly groaning organs and a bossa nova drum machine," and while lyrically "not exactly a brand-new sentiment" for Timberlake, it is "one sweet enough that it's hard to really get up much hate for." It was voted as favorite new music release in their weekly poll. Consequence gave the song a widely negative review, calling it "a turd" and stating that "'Selfish' isn't even bad enough to be interesting, and it's certainly not ambitious; it's like he was aiming squarely for mediocre and still came up short." The New York Times found it thematically similar to Nick Jonas's 2014 single "Jealous". The Daily Beast also compared "Selfish" to Jonas's song, and said it "seems to be mature, radio-friendly, well-produced, and, yes, ambitionless pop."

== Promotion ==
=== Music video ===
An official music video, directed by Bradley Calder, was released on January 25, 2024.

The music video on YouTube has received over 50 million views as of April 2025.

=== Live performances ===
On January 19, 2024, Timberlake performed a free one-night-only concert at the Orpheum in Memphis where he live-debuted the new single after teasing a new project on social media in previous days. On January 27, 2024, Timberlake performed the single on Saturday Night Live. The performance was introduced by Jimmy Fallon. Timberlake performed the song on the February 23, 2024 episode of the UK's The Graham Norton Show. In April 2024, Timberlake opened the iHeartRadio Music Awards, performing the single, as well as "No Angels", the second single off of Everything I Thought It Was. Timberlake also performed the song on his seventh concert tour, The Forget Tomorrow World Tour (2024).

== Chart performance ==
In the United States, "Selfish" debuted and peaked at number 19 on the Billboard Hot 100. It became his 39th career solo entry on the Hot 100 and his 29th to reach the top 40. In Canada, the track debuted and peaked at number 22 on the Canadian Hot 100.

In the United Kingdom, "Selfish" debuted at number 47 on the UK Singles Downloads Chart and number 51 on the Singles Sales Chart on January 26, 2024. On January 29, 2024, the song appeared at number 35 on the country's Singles Midweek Chart and ended up debuting at number 37 on the main chart on February 2, 2024; it appeared on that chart for nine weeks. "Selfish" climbed to its eventual peak at number 29 in the following week. Six weeks after its release, the song peaked at number 5 on the UK Singles Downloads Chart.

== Personnel ==
- Justin Timberlake – vocals, songwriter, producer
- Amy Allen – songwriter
- Henry Walter – songwriter, producer
- Louis Bell – songwriter, producer
- Theron Thomas – songwriter

== Charts ==
=== Weekly charts ===
Weekly chart performance
Chart (2024)	Peak position
Australia (ARIA)	82
Belarus Airplay (TopHit)	14
Belgium (Ultratop 50 Flanders)	36
Bulgaria Airplay (PROPHON)	10
Canada Hot 100 (Billboard)	22
Canada AC (Billboard)	7
Canada CHR/Top 40 (Billboard)	8
Canada Hot AC (Billboard)	4
CIS Airplay (TopHit)	3
Croatia International Airplay (Top lista)	13
Czech Republic Airplay (ČNS IFPI)	51
Estonia Airplay (TopHit)	2
Germany (GfK)	56
Global 200 (Billboard)	33
Iceland (Tónlistinn)	37
Ireland (IRMA)	52
Israel International Airplay (Media Forest)	4
Japan Hot Overseas (Billboard Japan)	3
Kazakhstan Airplay (TopHit)	9
Latvia Airplay (LAIPA)	13
Lithuania Airplay (TopHit)	13
Moldova Airplay (TopHit)	107
Netherlands (Dutch Top 40)	39
Netherlands (Single Top 100)	100
New Zealand Hot Singles (RMNZ)	5
Nigeria Airplay (TurnTable Top 100)	96
Panama (Monitor Latino)	6
Poland (Polish Airplay Top 100)	17
Portugal (AFP)	169
Romania Airplay (Media Forest)	6
Romania TV Airplay (Media Forest)	8
Russia Airplay (TopHit)	10
San Marino (SMRRTV Top 50)	20
Slovakia Airplay (ČNS IFPI)	15
South Africa Airplay (TOSAC)	1
South Korea BGM (Circle)	92
Sweden (Sverigetopplistan)	60
Switzerland (Schweizer Hitparade)	45
Ukraine Airplay (TopHit)	168
UK Singles (Official Charts)	29
US Billboard Hot 100	19
US Adult Contemporary (Billboard)	11
US Adult Pop Airplay (Billboard)	2
US Dance Airplay (Billboard)	35
US Pop Airplay (Billboard)	9
US Rhythmic Airplay (Billboard)	16
Venezuela Airplay (Record Report)	43

=== Monthly charts ===
Monthly chart performance
Chart (2024)	Peak position
Belarus Airplay (TopHit)	16
CIS Airplay (TopHit)	5
Czech Republic (Rádio – Top 100)	67
Estonia Airplay (TopHit)	3
Kazakhstan Airplay (TopHit)	12
Lithuania Airplay (TopHit)	14
Romania Airplay (TopHit)	14
Russia Airplay (TopHit)	12
Slovakia (Rádio – Top 100)	23

=== Year-end charts ===
Annual chart rankings
Chart (2024)	Position
Belarus Airplay (TopHit)	100
Canada (Canadian Hot 100)	85
CIS Airplay (TopHit)	40
Estonia Airplay (TopHit)	39
Iceland (Tónlistinn)	55
Kazakhstan Airplay (TopHit)	40
Russia Airplay (TopHit)	57
US Adult Contemporary (Billboard)	16
US Adult Top 40 (Billboard)	18
US Mainstream Top 40 (Billboard)	39
US Radio Songs (Billboard)	53
Venezuela Baladas (Record Report)	20

== Certifications ==
Certifications for "Selfish"
Region	Certification	Certified units/sales
Brazil (Pro-Música Brasil)	Gold	20,000^{‡}
Canada (Music Canada)	Platinum	80,000^{‡}
Poland (ZPAV)	Gold	25,000^{‡}
United Kingdom (BPI)	Silver	200,000
^{‡} Sales+streaming figures based on certification alone.

== Release history ==
Release dates and formats for "Selfish"
Region	Date	Format	Label	Ref.
Various	January 25, 2024	Digital download; streaming	RCA	
Italy	January 26, 2024	Radio airplay	Sony Italy	
