= Everything I Thought It Was =

Studio album by Justin Timberlake
- Released: March 15, 2024
- Genres: R&B; hip-hop; pop; nu-disco
- Length: 76:54
- Label: RCA
- Producers: Louis Bell; Cirkut; Danja; Andrew DeRoberts; Rob Knox; Angel López; Ryan Tedder; Timbaland; Justin Timberlake; Federico Vindver; Rio Root

Justin Timberlake chronology
Man of the Woods (2018)	Everything I Thought It Was (2024)

Singles from Everything I Thought It Was
- 1. "Selfish" Released: January 25, 2024; 2. "No Angels" Released: March 15, 2024; 3. "Drown" Released: November 1, 2024

Everything I Thought It Was is the sixth studio album by American singer Justin Timberlake. It was released on March 15, 2024, through RCA Records, as the follow-up to his fifth studio album, Man of the Woods (2018). An R&B, hip-hop, pop, and nu-disco album, it features guest appearances from Fireboy DML, Tobe Nwigwe, and fellow NSYNC members. Timberlake, together with Danja, Federico Vindver, Calvin Harris, Timbaland, Louis Bell, Cirkut, Ryan Tedder, Rob Knox, and others, produced the record. The album spawned three singles: "Selfish", "No Angels", and "Drown".

Everything I Thought It Was received mixed reviews from music critics and reached the top ten in Austria, Belgium, Germany, the Netherlands, Poland, Switzerland, the United Kingdom, and the United States. Its lead single, "Selfish", reached the top 20 of the Billboard Hot 100. To promote the album, Timberlake embarked on his seventh concert tour, The Forget Tomorrow World Tour, which began on April 29, 2024, and concluded on July 30, 2025.

== Background and composition ==
In 2023, Justin Timberlake reunited with former members of his band, NSYNC, and released the single "Better Place" in support of the Trolls Band Together soundtrack, and a collaboration with Timbaland and Nelly Furtado titled "Keep Going Up". Timberlake had also collaborated with Romeo Santos on the song "Sin Fin", with Jack Harlow on the song "Parent Trap" for Harlow's album Come Home the Kids Miss You, a remix of Coco Jones' song "ICU", and a further remix of the song "3D" by Jungkook. Timberlake had also worked with Calvin Harris, producer of "Fuckin' Up the Disco" and "No Angels", alongside Pharrell Williams and Halsey, on Harris's song "Stay with Me".

On January 19, 2024, after the release of the singles, Timberlake unveiled a trailer for an upcoming project titled Everything I Thought It Was, which was narrated by Benicio del Toro. Timberlake announced the album on January 25, alongside the release of the lead single, "Selfish". Timberlake said Everything I Thought It Was has "incredibly honest" moments but is also "a lot of fucking fun". He called it his "most straightforward" record to date, referring to it as "complex within its simplicity". In an interview with Zane Lowe for Apple Music's New Music Daily promotion, Timberlake said the album title was inspired when a friend, after listening to it, told him: "This sounds like everything I thought I wanted from you". It is an R&B, hip-hop, pop, and nu-disco record.

== Release and promotion ==
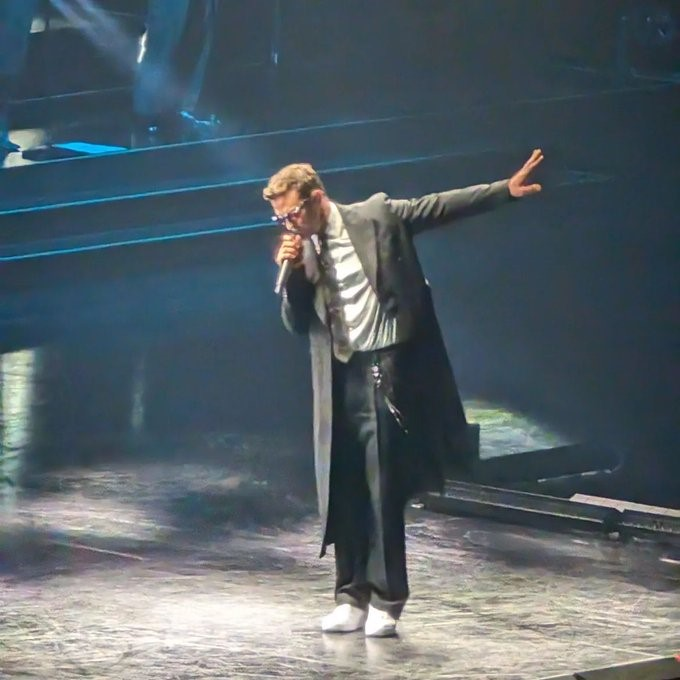
Timberlake performing on The Forget Tomorrow World Tour in Seattle on May 2, 2024.

After teasing a new project on social media in previous days, on January 19, 2024, Timberlake performed a free, one-night-only concert in Memphis, Tennessee, where he live-debuted his new single, "Selfish". On January 25, Timberlake appeared on The Tonight Show Starring Jimmy Fallon; he announced the release of "Selfish" and said the album had taken four years to produce. Timberlake appeared and performed on the January 27 episode of Saturday Night Live, singing "Selfish" and "Sanctified". On January 30, he appeared on The Kelly Clarkson Show, and the following day, his 43rd birthday, held a concert at Irving Plaza, New York City.

On February 22, 2024, Timberlake performed "Selfish" on The Graham Norton Show. The following day, due to an illness, he canceled his A One Night Only concert that was to be held that night at Roundhouse in London, UK. Timberlake then appeared on Complex's show Sneaker Shopping on March 11, and mentioned the release of his new album at the end of the video. On March 13, Timberlake performed a concert at the Wiltern in Los Angeles; the show included a surprise reunion with his NSYNC bandmates, who performed a medley of hits and the new album track "Paradise". On March 15, Timberlake performed a half-hour session on NPR Music's series Tiny Desk. He also announced the release of a documentary showing the album's creation process. In April 2024, Timberlake opened the iHeartRadio Music Awards, performing "Selfish" and "No Angels".

=== Singles ===
"Selfish" was released as the first single from Everything I Thought It Was on January 25, 2024, and its official music video premiered the same day. The song debuted at number 19 on the US Billboard Hot 100, becoming his 39th solo-career entry on the Hot 100, and his 29th to reach the top 40. In Canada, the track debuted and peaked at number 22 on the Canadian Hot 100.

"No Angels" was released as the album's second single; an official music video was directed by Ti West and released on March 15, 2024. He performed the single live on Jimmy Kimmel Live!. Timberlake teased "Drown" in an Instagram post on February 19, 2024, and released it as a promotional single on February 23. "Drown" later impacted Italian radio as the album's third single.

=== Tour ===
Timberlake promoted Everything I Thought It Was with The Forget Tomorrow World Tour, which began on April 29, 2024, in Vancouver, Canada. The tour became Timberlake's fastest-selling to date, amassing over $140 million globally in initial ticket sales, with over one million expected attendees. On February 23, 2024, Timberlake announced mid-2024 Europe tour dates. On May 20, 2024, Pollstar announced nine additional shows were added due to "overwhelming demand". The Forget Tomorrow World Tour received generally positive reviews.

== Critical reception ==
Professional ratings
Aggregate scores
Source	Rating
AnyDecentMusic?	4.6/10
Metacritic	51/100
Review scores
Source	Rating
AllMusic	3/5 stars
Clash	6/10
The Daily Telegraph	3/5 stars
The Guardian	3/5 stars
Hot Press	8/10
The Independent	2/5 stars
La Presse	4.5/10
MusicOMH	2/5 stars
NME	3/5 stars
Pitchfork	4.9/10

At Metacritic, which assigns a normalized rating out of 100 to reviews from mainstream critics, Everything I Thought It Was received an average score of 51 based on 17 reviews, indicating "mixed or average reviews". The review aggregator site AnyDecentMusic? compiled 13 reviews and gave Everything I Thought It Was an average of 4.6 out of 10, based on an assessment of the critical consensus.

Frazier Tharpe of GQ gave Everything I Thought It Was a positive review; he wrote: "Timberlake brings grown-and-sexy back on Everything I Thought It Was. The NSYNC reunion will make headlines, but as usual, it's Timberlake and Timbaland for the win." Steven J. Horowitz of Variety said that for Timberlake, the album "feels like a stopgap on the road to Adult Contemporary — he's not at greatest-hits-tour status just yet, but it may not be far off". Associated Press critic Maria Sherman stated: "In its better tracks ... Everything I Thought It Was is a return to form for the musician. In the moments when his immediately recognizable falsetto eases into a familiar kind of future funk, it works. In others, it feels like poorly timed nostalgia." Paul Attard of Slant Magazine said that "one could never fault Everything I Thought I Was for being too conservative, but it's an all too clear case of quantity over quality, resulting in quickly diminishing returns".

Neil Z. Yeung of AllMusic gave Everything I Thought It Was three stars out of five, and called it "at least better executed" than the "uneven" Man of the Woods and "on par" with The 20/20 Experience. He commented, "Some focus and editing would have really helped because there's a great album buried somewhere in here." Robin Murray of Clash thought that it "can sometimes be forgettable across its 18-track largesse, while thematically it feels bunched around a cluster of feelings". Writing for The Guardian, Laura Snapes said Everything I Thought It Was "seems less like a straightforward comeback than a survival mission". Pitchfork editor Owen Myers wrote the album "is less of a faceplant than a comfortable rehash of past glories. [Timberlake] scales his stuttering electro and squelchy '80s funk into hollow, expensive-sounding maximalism." Zach Schonfeld of Spin said it "presents a harder-edged JT, who tries a little of everything over 77 minutes but adds remarkably little to the pop landscape".

== Commercial performance ==
Everything I Thought It Was debuted at number four on the US Billboard 200, earning 67,000 album-equivalent units, calculated from 31.13 million on-demand streams and 41,000 pure album copies. This marked Timberlake's sixth-consecutive top-five album in the country.

The album debuted at number five in Germany and at number three in the Netherlands. In the UK, Everything I Thought It Was debuted at number five on the UK Albums Chart. It debuted at number one on the Album Downloads Chart and at number 15 on the UK Vinyl Albums Chart. In Australia, the album charted at number 23, becoming Timberlake's first album to peak outside the top ten in the country.

== Track listing ==
Everything I Thought It Was track listing
No.	Title	Writer(s)	Producer(s)	Length
1.	"Memphis"	Justin Timberlake; Kenyon Dixon; Floyd Nathaniel Hills	Timberlake; Danja	4:29
2.	"Fuckin' Up the Disco"	Timberlake; Angel López; Federico Vindver; Adam Richard Wiles	Timberlake; López; Vindver; Calvin Harris^{[a]}	4:22
3.	"No Angels"	Timberlake; López; Vindver; Wiles	Timberlake; López; Vindver; Harris^{[a]}	3:28
4.	"Play"	Timberlake; Ryan Tedder; Michael Pollack; Hills; Vindver; Zach Skelton; Andrew DeRoberts	Timberlake; Tedder; Vindver; Danja; DeRoberts	2:51
5.	"Technicolor"	Timberlake; Timothy Mosley; Kenyon Dixon; López; Vindver; Larrance Dopson; Rio Root	Timberlake; Timbaland; López; Root; Vindver	7:17
6.	"Drown"	Timberlake; Amy Allen; Henry Walter; Louis Bell; Kenyon Dixon	Timberlake; Bell; Cirkut	4:20
7.	"Liar" (featuring Fireboy DML)	Timberlake; Adedamola Adefolahan; Kenyon Dixon; Hills; Atia Boggs; Allen	Timberlake; Danja	3:26
8.	"Infinity Sex"	Timberlake; López; Mosley; Vindver; James Fauntleroy; Wiles	Timberlake; Timbaland; Vindver; Harris^{[a]}	3:49
9.	"Love & War"	Timberlake; Kenyon Dixon; López; Mosley; Vindver; Dopson	Timberlake; Timbaland; López; Vindver	3:34
10.	"Sanctified" (featuring Tobe Nwigwe)	Timberlake; Tobechukwu Nwigwe; Kenyon Dixon; Elliott Ives; Robin Tadross; Hills	Timberlake; Danja; Rob Knox	5:11
11.	"My Favorite Drug"	Timberlake; Bell; Walter; Theron Thomas; Allen; Douglas Ford	Timberlake; Bell; Cirkut	5:01
12.	"Flame"	Timberlake; Kenyon Dixon; Hills; Tadross; Elliott Ives	Timberlake; Danja; Knox	5:41
13.	"Imagination"	Timberlake; Bell; Walter; Thomas; Allen; Dopson	Timberlake; Bell; Cirkut	3:16
14.	"What Lovers Do"	Timberlake; Kenyon Dixon; Mosley; López; Vindver; Dopson	Timberlake; Timbaland; López; Vindver	3:42
15.	"Selfish"	Timberlake; Allen; Walter; Bell; Thomas	Timberlake; Bell; Cirkut	3:49
16.	"Alone"	Timberlake; Kenyon Dixon; Hills	Timberlake; Danja	3:36
17.	"Paradise" (featuring *NSYNC)	Timberlake; Kenyon Dixon; López; Mosley; Vindver	Timberlake; Timbaland; López; Vindver	4:26
18.	"Conditions"	Timberlake; Kenyon Dixon; Bell; Walter; Thomas; Allen	Timberlake; Bell; Cirkut	4:36
Total length:				76:54

=== Notes ===
- ^{^[a]} signifies a co-producer.

== Credits and personnel ==
Credits are adapted from the album's liner notes.

=== Musicians ===
- Justin Timberlake – vocals
- Elliot Ives – guitar (tracks 1, 3, 4, 8–10, 12, 14), bass (3)
- James Ford III – flugelhorn, trumpet (1, 9, 17)
- Raymond Monteiro – flugelhorn, trumpet (1, 9, 17)
- Robert Avallone – flugelhorn, trumpet (1, 9, 17)
- Fred Jackson – flute, saxophone (1, 9, 17)
- Keith Fiddmont – flute, saxophone (1, 9, 17)
- Leon Silva – flute, saxophone (1, 9, 17); tenor saxophone (13)
- Phillip Whack – flute, saxophone (1, 9, 17)
- Louis Van Taylor – saxophone (1, 9, 17)
- Kevin Williams – trombone (1, 9, 13, 17)
- Stephen Baxter – trombone (1, 9, 17)
- Wendell Kelly – trombone (1, 9, 17)
- Adam Blackstone – bass (tracks 4, 11, 13)
- Damien "Dammo" Farmer – bass (track 8)
- Chris Payton – guitar (tracks 13, 18)
- Larrance Dopson – keyboards (tracks 13, 18)
- Sean Erick – trumpet (track 13)
- Danja – piano (track 16)
- Kenyon Dixon – piano (track 16)
- Peter Lee Johnson – strings (track 16)
- *NSYNC – vocals (track 17)

=== Technical ===
- Randy Merrill – mastering
- Chris Godbey – mixing (all tracks), engineering (tracks 1–5, 7–10, 12, 14, 16, 17)
- Justin Timberlake – mixing
- Damien Lewis – engineering (tracks 1, 2, 4, 9, 10, 12, 14, 18)
- Louis Bell – engineering (tracks 6, 11, 13, 15)

== Charts ==
Chart performance for Everything I Thought It Was
Chart (2024–2025)	Peak position
Australian Albums (ARIA)	23
Austrian Albums (Ö3 Austria)	7
Belgian Albums (Ultratop Flanders)	3
Belgian Albums (Ultratop Wallonia)	6
Canadian Albums (Billboard)	17
Danish Albums (Hitlisten)	13
Dutch Albums (Album Top 100)	3
French Albums (SNEP)	19
German Albums (Offizielle Top 100)	5
Hungarian Physical Albums (MAHASZ)	20
Irish Albums (Official Charts)	48
Italian Albums (FIMI)	41
Japanese Digital Albums (Oricon)	16
Japanese Hot Albums (Billboard Japan)	47
Lithuanian Albums (AGATA)	44
New Zealand Albums (RMNZ)	25
Polish Albums (ZPAV)	2
Portuguese Albums (AFP)	23
Scottish Albums (Official Charts)	12
Spanish Albums (Promusicae)	24
Swedish Albums (Sverigetopplistan)	37
Swiss Albums (Schweizer Hitparade)	5
UK Albums (Official Charts)	5
US Billboard 200	4
