= No Angels (song) =

2024 single by Justin Timberlake

Single by Justin Timberlake

from the album Everything I Thought It Was
- Released: March 15, 2024
- Genre: Disco
- Length: 3:28
- Label: RCA
- Songwriters: Justin Timberlake; Adam Wiles; Angel Lopez; Federico Vindver
- Producers: Timberlake; Calvin Harris; Lopez; Vindver

Justin Timberlake singles chronology
| "Drown" (2024) | "No Angels" (2024) |

Music video
- "No Angels" on YouTube

"No Angels" is a song by American singer-songwriter Justin Timberlake. It was released on March 15, 2024, as the second single from his sixth studio album, Everything I Thought It Was, which was released on the same day. The song was officially added to US radio on April 15, 2024.

== Live performances ==
Timberlake performed the single for the first time live on Jimmy Kimmel Live!. In April 2024, Timberlake opened the iHeartRadio Music Awards, performing the single, as well as "Selfish", the lead single off of Everything I Thought It Was. Timberlake also opened The Forget Tomorrow World Tour with the single.

== Music video ==
The director's cut music video to "No Angels" was directed by Ti West. It was released on March 15, 2024. A shorter version, titled the Official Video, was released March 18, 2024. Both versions of the music video on YouTube have over 5 million combined views.

== Chart performance ==
"No Angels" debuted at number 18 on the New Zealand Hot Singles Chart.

In the United Kingdom, "No Angels" debuted and peaked on the Official Singles Sales and Official Singles Downloads Charts at numbers 58 and 54, respectively, on March 22, 2024.

== Charts ==
=== Weekly charts ===
Weekly Chart performance for "No Angels"
| Chart (2024) | Peak position |
|---|---|
| Canada CHR/Top 40 (Billboard) | 40 |
| Czech Republic Airplay (ČNS IFPI) | 52 |
| Estonia Airplay (TopHit) | 98 |
| Japan Hot Overseas (Billboard Japan) | 2 |
| Latvia Airplay (TopHit) | 112 |
| Lithuania Airplay (TopHit) | 42 |
| Netherlands (Tipparade) | 25 |
| New Zealand Hot Singles (RMNZ) | 18 |
| San Marino (SMRRTV Top 50) | 13 |
| Slovakia Airplay (ČNS IFPI) | 99 |
| UK Singles Downloads (Official Charts) | 54 |
| UK Singles Sales (OCC) | 58 |
| US Bubbling Under Hot 100 (Billboard) | 19 |
| US Adult Pop Airplay (Billboard) | 13 |
| US Pop Airplay (Billboard) | 23 |

=== Monthly charts ===
Monthly chart performance for "No Angels"
| Chart (2024) | Peak position |
|---|---|
| Czech Republic (Rádio – Top 100) | 91 |
| Lithuania Airplay (TopHit) | 52 |

== Release history ==
Release dates and formats for "Selfish"
| Region | Date | Format | Label | Ref. |
|---|---|---|---|---|
| Various | March 15, 2024 | Digital download; streaming | RCA | |
| Italy | March 15, 2024 | Radio airplay | Sony | |
