= Kenyon Dixon =

American singer & musician (born 1989)

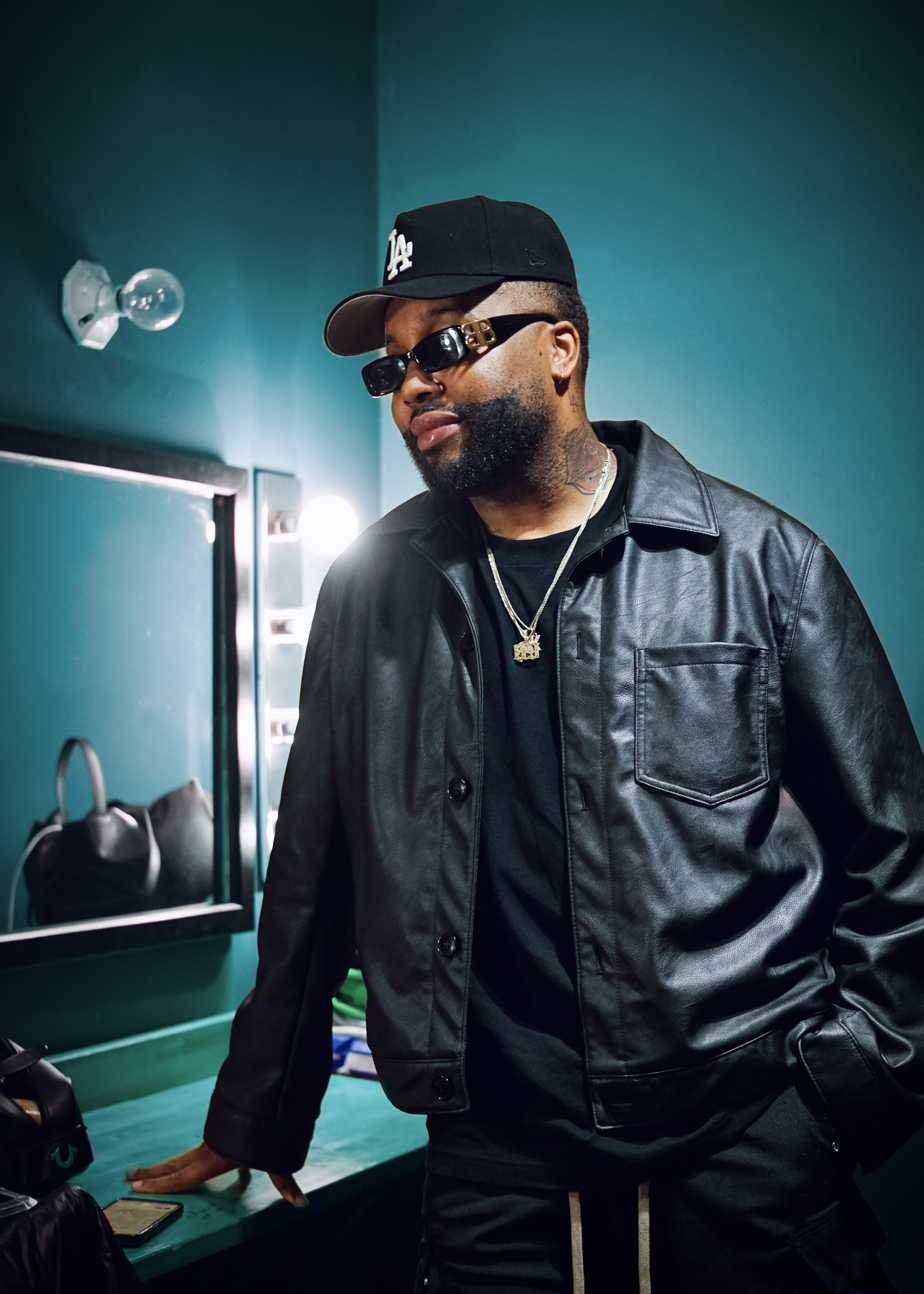
- Dixon in 2024

Background information
- Born: July 7, 1989 (age 37); Watts, Los Angeles, California, U.S.
- Genres: R&B; soul
- Occupations: Singer; songwriter; musician; producer
- Website: www.instagram.com/kennygotsoul x.com/kennygotsoul

Kenyon Dixon (born July 7, 1989) is an American Grammy-nominated R&B singer-songwriter, musician, and producer.

== Early life ==
Dixon, the youngest of seven children, was born in Watts, Los Angeles, California, and was raised in the Jordan Downs public housing projects. His upbringing in public housing was contrasted by his parents' roles as pastors and his roots in the Church of God in Christ. During his early years, he was only permitted to listen to gospel music, which his parents both performed—his mother as a gospel singer and his father as a quartet singer. Despite the heavy musical influence of his family, Dixon initially rejected the musical path and instead pursued dance. Not until high school did Dixon really explore his musical gifts, getting ushered into various talent shows by friends and teachers.

== Career ==
Dixon got his start in the early 2010's with his first big writing placement on Tyrese's "Open Invitation," co-writing "What Took You So Long." He has also worked with artists such as Beyonce, Mary J. Blige, PJ Morton, Twenty One Pilots, Tank, Ginuwine, Kirk Franklin, Coco Jones (ICU Remix), and Justin Timberlake (Perfect For Me from Trolls World Tour) and co-wrote on Timberlake's "Everything I Thought It Was"

As a vocalist, he has worked with, 2 Chainz, Kelly Rowland, Nick Jonas, Jill Scott, Kanye West, the BBC’s That’s My Jam House Band, and performed at the Oscars in 2017. Dixon was also featured at the 55th NAACP Image Awards Gala's Frankie Beverly tribute alongside Kenny Lattimore, Lalah Hathaway, and Luke James.

Though he continued to work on other artists’ projects, Dixon began independently releasing his own solo projects such as Higher Ground, We Should Talk, Niggas Get Emotional Too, and R&B Kenny. Dixon was thrust into the R&B spotlight with his release of Expectations in 2021, followed by Closer in 2022, and most recently, The R&B You Love. He received Grammy nominations for Best Traditional R&B Performance at the 67th Annual Grammy Awards for “Can I Have This Groove,” Best Traditional R&B Performance at the 66th Annual Grammy Awards for the song "Lucky," and has previously been nominated for Bring it Home to Me at the 64th Annual Grammy Awards, alongside PJ Morton, BJ the Chicago Kid, and Charlie Bereal.

He has gained recognition for his contributions to R&B in major music outlets including having his album "Closer" named one of the top R&B albums of 2022 in Revolt and one of the best R&B albums of 2023 in Vibe.

== Discography ==
Albums

- Higher Ground (2015)
- We Should Talk (2017)
- Niggas Get Emotional Too (2018)
- R&B Kenny (2019)
- Expectations (2021)
- Closer (2022)
- The R&B You Love (2023)
- Come As You Are (with Terrace Martin) (2025)

EPs

- Twenty Four (2014)
- Switch (2018)
- The R&B You Love: Soul of the '70s (2024)
- The R&B You Love: For the '99 & the 00s (2024)

Singles

- "Freak" (2019)
- "Switch" (2020)
- "Escape" (2021)
- "Morning After" (2021)
- "Love on Replay" (2022)
- "Get High, Get By" (2022)
- "Getting Late" (2022)
- "Slow Dancing" (2023)
- "'98 Vibes (Do You Right)" (2023)
- "Lucky" (2023)
- "Still" (2024)
- "Far Away" (2024)

Deluxe albums

- Closer (Deluxe) (2022)
