= List of songs recorded by Justin Timberlake =

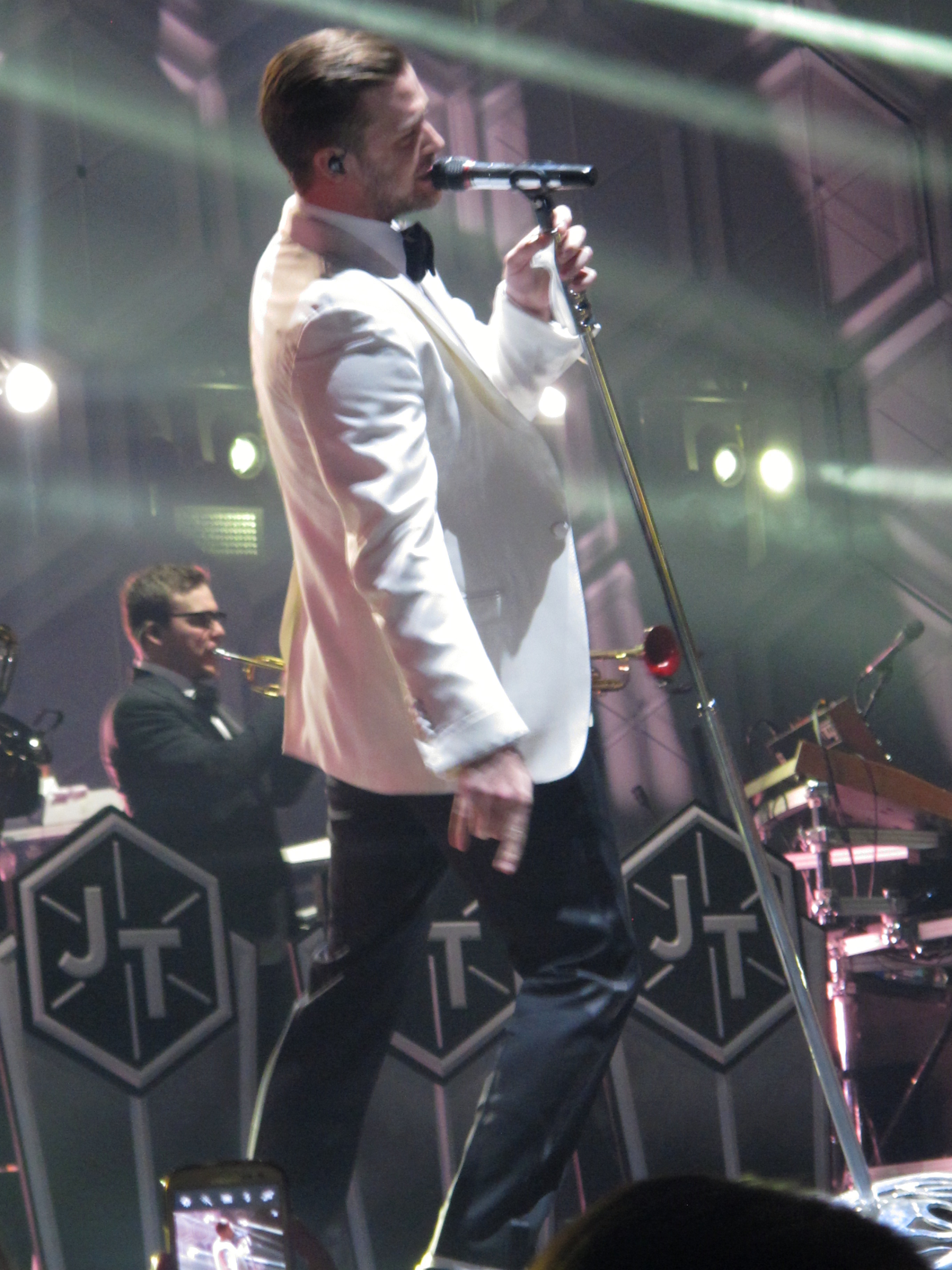
- Timberlake in 2014
- Category: Songs
Released Songs	167
Unreleased Songs	27
Total	194

American singer Justin Timberlake has written and recorded material for his five studio albums. Timberlake released his solo debut studio album, Justified, in November 2002. Most of the album was produced by The Neptunes, with additional collaborators including Brian McKnight, Scott Storch, Timbaland, and The Underdogs. "Like I Love You", written by Timberlake, Chad Hugo, and Pharrell Williams. "Cry Me a River", produced by Timbaland, an R&B song about a brokenhearted man who moves on from his past, went on to win the Best Male Video and Best Pop Video at the 2003 VMAs. A Rolling Stone reviewer called the song a "breakup aria." Timberlake, Hugo and Williams also wrote "Rock Your Body", and "Señorita".

His second studio album FutureSex/LoveSounds, was released in September 2006. It infuses R&B and pop with techno, funk, and elements of rock, the last being the genre that was the main inspiration of Timberlake during the album's recording. The electro R&B song "SexyBack", is built around a pounding bass beat, electronic chords, and beat box sounds. Andrew Murfett of The Age wrote that the song was a "raunchy club banger that slyly suppresses" Timberlake's customary falsetto. "My Love" is a synthpop-influenced, R&B and hip hop song. "What Goes Around... Comes Around", is a pop-R&B song performed in a slow manner and was described by some music critics as a "sequel" to his 2002 song "Cry Me a River". "LoveStoned/I Think She Knows" is an R&B and art rock song that contains sexually suggestive lyrics and includes "human beatbox sounds" in its composition. Rolling Stone described the song as "flowing from hip-hop bump-and-grind to an ambient wash of Interpol-inspired guitar drone." Timberlake co-wrote and appeared as a featured vocalist on several songs, including "Give It to Me" with Timbaland, "Ayo Technology" with 50 Cent, "4 Minutes" with Madonna and "Dead and Gone" with T.I.

In March 2013, after a seven-year hiatus from his solo music career, Timberlake released his third studio album, The 20/20 Experience. The record incorporates neo soul styles with elements of older rock and soul music; its lyrics discuss themes of romance and sex. As a songwriter, Timberlake mainly collaborated with Timbaland, Jerome "J-Roc" Harmon, and James Fauntleroy, and co-produced the tracks along with Timbaland and Harmon. "Suit & Tie", is a mid-tempo R&B song, that incorporates a "slow-drawl" consisting of slowed down synths and "slightly out of time" drum claps, similar to the Chopped and Screwed. "Mirrors", is a progressive pop and R&B track, lyrically a love song about person's other half. "Let the Groove Get In" is a dance and pop song accompanied by canned horns, propulsive percussion and Timberlake's harmonized voice over a pop arrangement. In September 2013, Timberlake released the second half of the project, The 20/20 Experience – 2 of 2. It included the pop ballad "Not a Bad Thing" and the gospel-blues "Drink You Away". Timberlake also appeared on the songs "Love Never Felt So Good" from Xscape and "Holy Grail" from Magna Carta Holy Grail. For the disco-pop song "Can't Stop the Feeling!", Timberlake collaborated in the songwriting and production with Max Martin and Shellback. The production of his fifth studio album Man of the Woods (2018) was handled by Timberlake, The Neptunes, Timbaland, Danja, and Rob Knox.

This list shows the title, year, other performers, and writers for each song which Timberlake has recorded during his solo career, outside the band NSYNC.

== Released songs ==
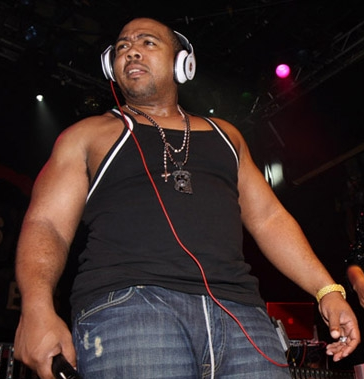
American record producer Timbaland has collaborated with Timberlake since the beginning of his solo career

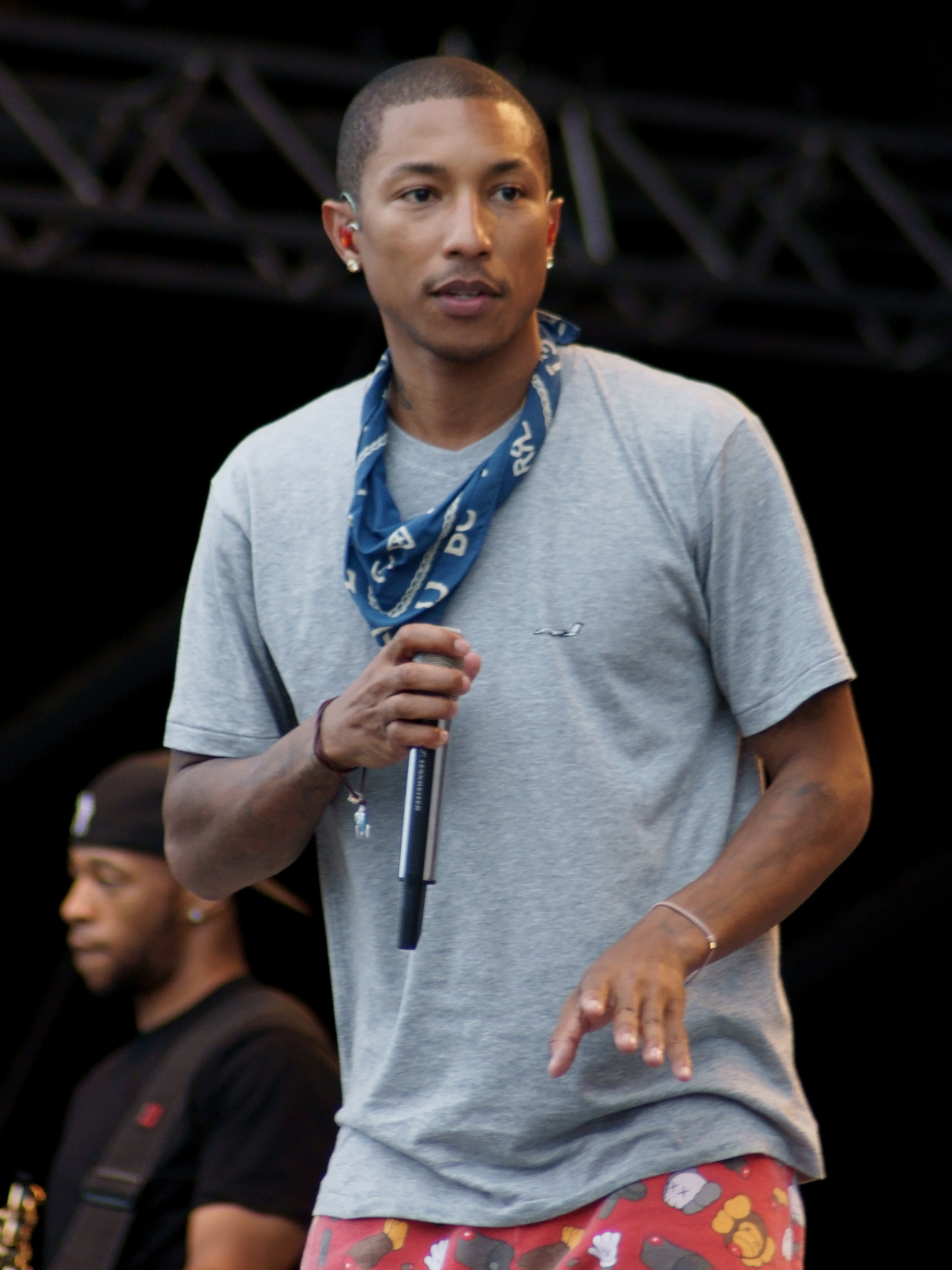
Pharrell Williams (pictured) worked producing and co-writing songs for Timberlake's first studio album Justified alongside Chad Hugo

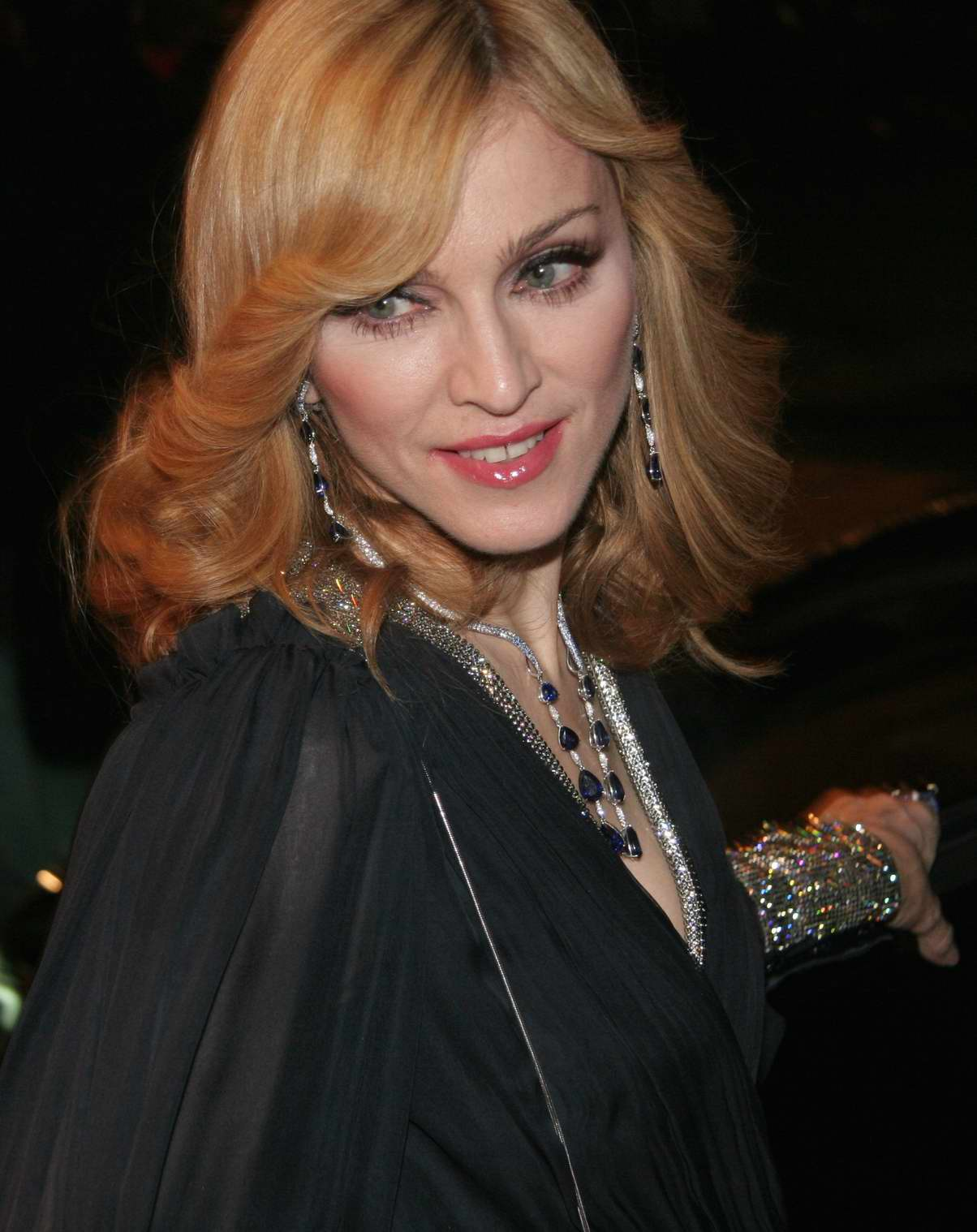
Timberlake provided vocals on Madonna's song "4 Minutes"

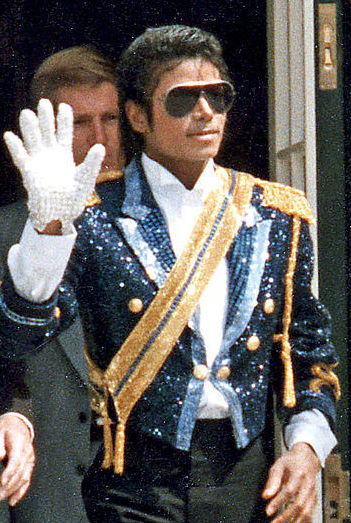
"Love Never Felt So Good" is a duet between Timberlake and Michael Jackson for Xscape

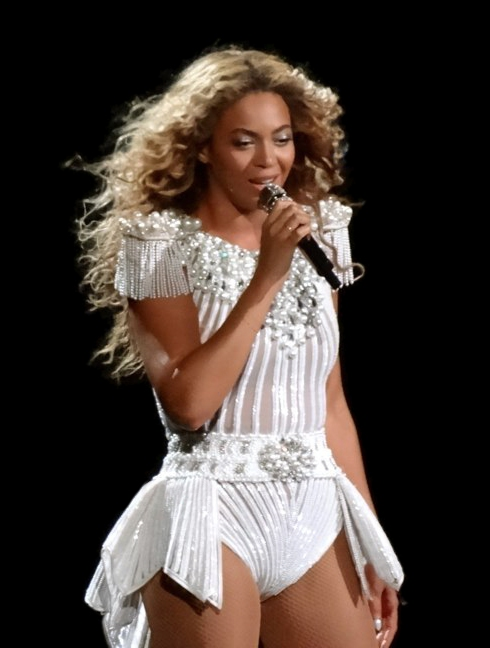
Timberlake collaborated with Beyoncé for the second version of "Until the End of Time"

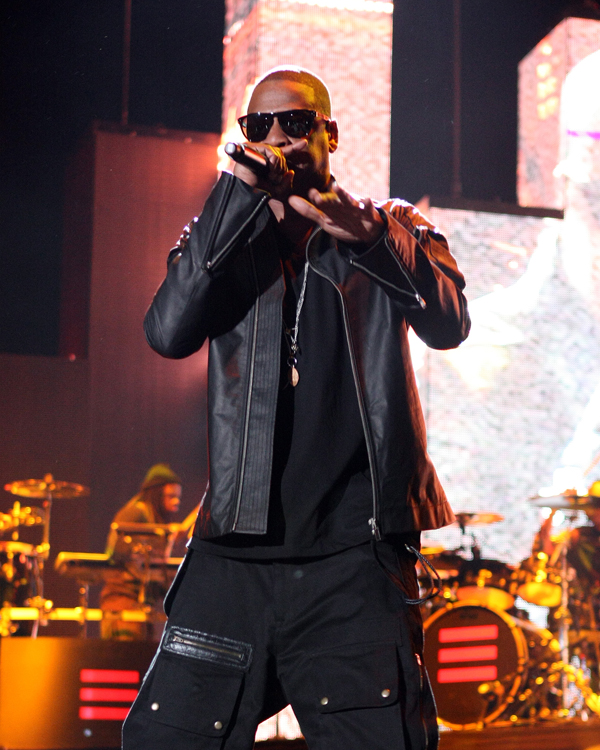
In 2013, American rapper Jay Z appeared on Timberlake's single "Suit & Tie", and they later collaborated on "Holy Grail"

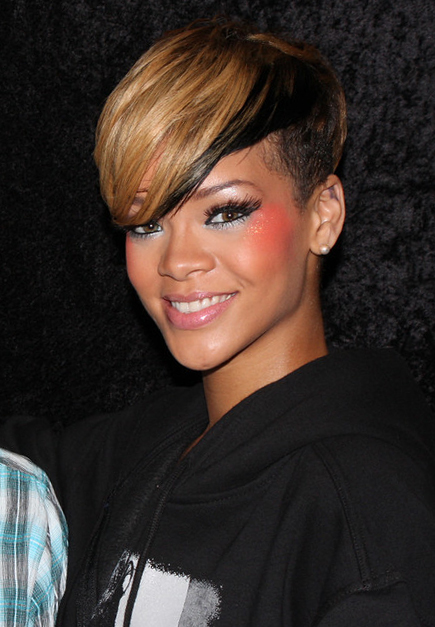
Timberlake did vocals on Rihanna's song "Hole in My Head"

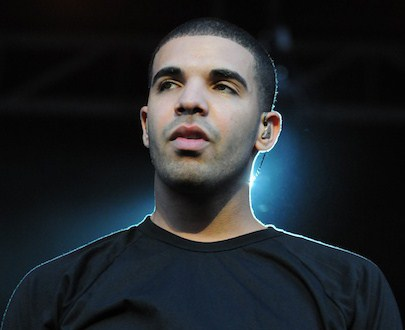
Drake wrote a verse for "Cabaret", on which he appears as a featured vocalist.

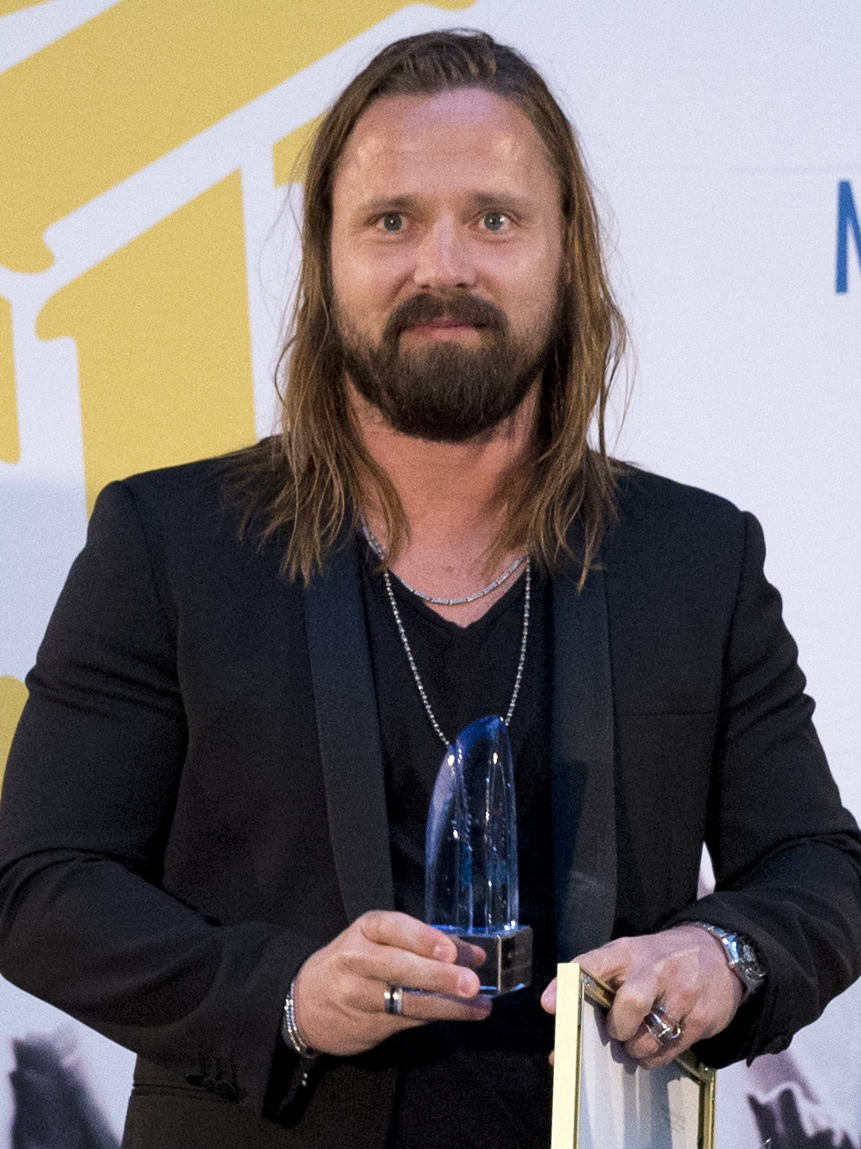
Timberlake wrote "Can't Stop the Feeling!" in collaboration with producer Max Martin

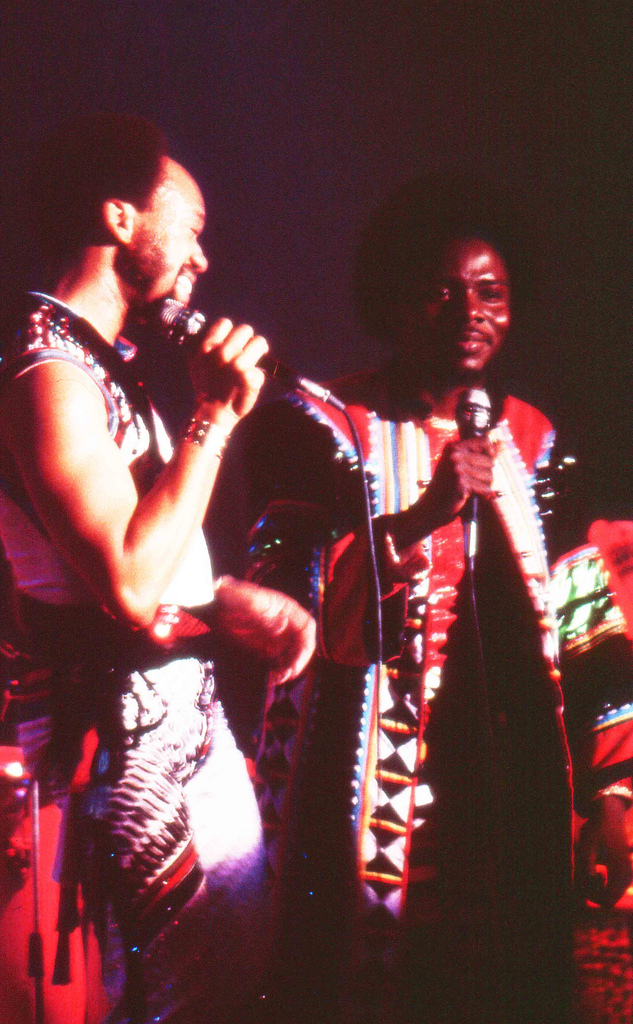
Earth, Wind & Fire re-recorded "September" with Timberlake for the Trolls soundtrack.

Name of songs, writers, originating album, and year released.
Song	Writer(s)	Originating album	Year	Ref.
"3-Way (The Golden Rule)" (The Lonely Island featuring Justin Timberlake and Lady Gaga)	The Lonely Island; Justin Timberlake; The Futuristics	The Wack Album	2012	
"4 Minutes" (Madonna featuring Justin Timberlake and Timbaland)	Madonna; Justin Timberlake; Timbaland; Danja	Hard Candy	2008	
"Ain't No Doubt About It" (Game featuring Justin Timberlake and Pharrell Williams)	Game; Justin Timberlake; Pharrell Williams	Non-album single	2010	
"Alone"	Justin Timberlake; Kenyon Dixon; Danja	Everything I Thought It Was	2024	
"Amnesia"	Justin Timberlake; Timbaland; J-Roc; James Fauntleroy; Daniel Jones	The 20/20 Experience – 2 of 2	2013	
"(And She Said) Take Me Now" (featuring Janet Jackson)	Justin Timberlake; Timbaland; Scott Storch	Justified	2002	
"(Another Song) All Over Again"	Justin Timberlake; Matt Morris	FutureSex/LoveSounds	2006	
"Ayo Technology" (50 Cent featuring Justin Timberlake)	50 Cent; Timbaland; Justin Timberlake; Danja	Curtis	2007	
"Believe" (Meek Mill featuring Justin Timberlake)	Robert Williams; Justin Timberlake; Rob Knox; Benjamin Johnson	Non-album single	2020	
"Better Days" (Ant Clemons & Justin Timberlake)	Ant Clemons; Justin Timberlake; Jacob Kasher Hindlin; Kenny Dixon	TBA	2020	
"Blindness"	Justin Timberlake; Rob Knox; James Fauntleroy	The 20/20 Experience – 2 of 2	2013	
"Blue Ocean Floor"	Justin Timberlake; Timbaland; J-Roc; James Fauntleroy	The 20/20 Experience	2013	
"Body Count"	Justin Timberlake; Rob Knox; James Fauntleroy	The 20/20 Experience	2013	
"Bounce" (Timbaland featuring Justin Timberlake, Dr. Dre and Missy Elliott)	Timbaland; Justin Timberlake; Dr. Dre; Missy Elliott	Shock Value	2007	
"Boutique in Heaven"	Justin Timberlake will.i.am Mike Shapiro	FutureSex/LoveSounds	2006	
"Brand New" (Pharrell Williams featuring Justin Timberlake)	Pharrell Williams	G I R L	2014	
"Breeze Off the Pond"	Justin Timberlake; Chad Hugo; Pharrell Williams	Man of the Woods	2018	
"Cabaret" (featuring Drake)	Justin Timberlake; Timbaland; Drake; J-Roc; James Fauntleroy; Daniel Jones	The 20/20 Experience – 2 of 2	2013	
"Can't Believe It (Remix)" (T-Pain featuring Justin Timberlake)	T-Pain; David Balfour; Justin Timberlake	Non-album single	2008	
"Can't Stop the Feeling!"	Justin Timberlake; Max Martin; Shellback	Trolls: Original Motion Picture Soundtrack	2016	
"Carry Out" (Timbaland featuring Justin Timberlake)	Timbaland; J-Roc; Justin Timberlake; Timothy Clayton; Jim Beanz	Shock Value II	2009	
"Casanova" (Esmée Denters featuring Justin Timberlake)	Esmée Denters; Justin Timberlake; Danja; Marcella Araica	Outta Here	2010	
"Chop Me Up" (featuring Timbaland and Three 6 Mafia)	Justin Timberlake; Timbaland; Danja; Juicy J DJ Paul	FutureSex/LoveSounds	2006	
"Conditions"	Justin Timberlake; Kenyon Dixon; Louis Bell; Cirkut; R. City; Amy Allen	Everything I Thought It Was	2024	
"Cry Me a River"	Justin Timberlake; Timbaland; Scott Storch	Justified	2002	
"Damn Girl" (Note: "Damn Girl" contains a sample of "A New Day (Is Here at Last)", written and performed by J. C. Davis.) (featuring will.i.am)	Justin Timberlake will.i.am J. C. Davis	FutureSex/LoveSounds	2006	
"Dance 2night" (Madonna featuring Justin Timberlake)	Madonna; Timbaland; Justin Timberlake; Hannon Lane	Hard Candy	2008	
"Dead and Gone" (T.I. featuring Justin Timberlake)	T.I. Justin Timberlake; Rob Knox	Paper Trail	2008	
"Dick in a Box" (The Lonely Island featuring Justin Timberlake)	The Lonely Island; Asa Taccone; Justin Timberlake; Katreese Barnes	Incredibad	2006	
"Don't Hold the Wall"	Justin Timberlake; Timbaland; J-Roc; James Fauntleroy	The 20/20 Experience	2013	
"Don't Slack" (Justin Timberlake & Anderson .Paak)	Justin Timberlake; Anderson .Paak; Ludwig Göransson	Trolls 2 World Tour: Official Soundtrack	2020	
"Double-Down Speed Round" (With Trolls Holiday cast)	Eric Goldman; David P. Smith; Killian Gray; Michael Corcoran	Trolls Holiday	2017	
"Dress On"	Justin Timberlake; Rob Knox; James Fauntleroy	The 20/20 Experience	2013	
"Drink You Away"	Justin Timberlake; Timbaland; J-Roc; James Fauntleroy	The 20/20 Experience – 2 of 2	2013	
"Drown"	Justin Timberlake; Amy Allen; Cirkut; Louis Bell; Kenyon Dixon	Everything I Thought It Was	2024	
"Electric Lady"	Justin Timberlake; Timbaland; J-Roc; James Fauntleroy	The 20/20 Experience – 2 of 2	2013	
"Fascinated" (FreeSol featuring Justin Timberlake and Timbaland)	Justin Timberlake; Timbaland; Chris Godbey; Free; J-Roc	Non-album single	2011	
"Filthy"	Justin Timberlake; Larrance Dopson; James Fauntleroy; Danja; Timbaland	Man of the Woods	2018	
"Five Hundred Miles" (With Carey Mulligan and Stark Sands)	Hedy West	Inside Llewyn Davis	2013	
"Flannel"	Justin Timberlake; Chad Hugo; Pharrell Williams	Man of the Woods	2018	
"Flame"	Justin Timberlake; Kenyon Dixon; Danja; Rob Knox; Elliott Ives	Everything I Thought It Was	2024	
"Floatin'" (Charlie Wilson featuring Justin Timberlake and will.i.am)	A. Moshe Davenport; J. Calloway; Justin Timberlake; Leroy Burgess; Patrick Adams	Charlie, Last Name Wilson	2005	
"Follow My Lead" (featuring Esmée Denters)	Justin Timberlake; Esmée Denters; Rob Knox; James Fauntleroy	Non-album single	2008	
"Friend Medley" (With Trolls Holiday cast)	John Deacon; Jalil Hutchins; Lawrence Smith; Bill Withers; Andrew Gold	Trolls Holiday	2017	
"Fuckin' Up the Disco"	Justin Timberlake; Angel López; Federico Vindver; Calvin Harris	Everything I Thought It Was	2024	
"FutureSex/LoveSound"	Justin Timberlake; Timbaland; Danja	FutureSex/LoveSounds	2006	
"Get Out" (Macy Gray featuring Justin Timberlake)	Macy Gray; Justin Timberlake; Caleb Speir; Mike Shapiro; Allen Toussaint	Big	2007	
"Gimme What I Don't Know (I Want)"	Justin Timberlake; Timbaland; J-Roc; James Fauntleroy	The 20/20 Experience – 2 of 2	2013	
"Give It to Me" (Timbaland featuring Nelly Furtado and Justin Timberlake)	Timbaland; Danja; Timothy Clayton; Justin Timberlake; Nelly Furtado	Shock Value	2007	
"Good Foot" (featuring Timbaland)	Justin Timberlake; Timbaland	Shark Tale	2004	
"Hallelujah" (featuring Matt Morris and Charlie Sexton)	Leonard Cohen	Hope for Haiti Now	2010	
"The Hard Stuff"	Justin Timberlake; Eric Hudson; Rob Knox	Man of the Woods	2018	
"Hair Up" (With Gwen Stefani and Ron Funches)	Justin Timberlake; Max Martin; Shellback; Savan Kotecha; Oscar Holter	Trolls: Original Motion Picture Soundtrack	2016	
"Heaven" (Note: "Heaven" contains a sample of "Reverie", performed by Adrian Younge and lyrically samples "Losing My Religion", performed by R.E.M.) (Jay-Z featuring Justin Timberlake)	Justin Timberlake; Jay-Z; The-Dream; Adrian Younge; J-Roc; R.E.M. Timbaland	Magna Carta Holy Grail	2013	
"Higher, Higher"	Justin Timberlake; Chad Hugo; Pharrell Williams	Man of the Woods	2018	
"History of Rap" (Jimmy Fallon featuring Justin Timberlake)	Various: Chris Stein Makeba Riddick Gregory Jacobs Missy Elliott Bootsy Collins Norman Durham Walter Morrison Soulja Boy Snoop Dogg Tarik Collins Bernard Edwards Labi Siffre Ad-Rock Larry Troutman Rick Rubin T.I. D.M.C. George Clinton, Jr. Justin G. Smith Leon Haywood Frederick Knight Roger Troutman Debbie Harry Ronnie Hudson Nile Rodgers Woody Cunningham Dan Balan Mikel Hooks Paul Simon Cody ChesnuTT Joseph Simmons	Blow Your Pants Off	2012	
"Hole in My Head" (Rihanna featuring Justin Timberlake)	Justin Timberlake; Rob Knox; James Fauntleroy	Rated R	2009	
"Holiday" (With Trolls Holiday cast)	Curtis Hudson; Lisa Stevens	Trolls Holiday	2017	
"Holy Grail" (Note: "Holy Grail" contains elements of "Smells Like Teen Spirit", performed by Nirvana) (Jay-Z featuring Justin Timberlake)	Justin Timberlake; Jay-Z; The-Dream; Timbaland; J-Roc; No ID; Nirvana	Magna Carta Holy Grail	2013	
"Hootnanny" (Bubba Sparxxx featuring Justin Timberlake)	Bubba Sparxxx; Timbaland; Justin Timberlake	Deliverance	2003	
"House Music" (Quavo featuring Justin Timberlake)	Quavo; Justin Timberlake	Qrömelife	2026	
"ICU (Remix)" (Coco Jones featuring Justin Timberlake)	Courtney Jones; Justin Timberlake; Darhyl Camper; Raymond Komba; Roy Rockette	ICU	2023	
"Imagination"	Justin Timberlake; Louis Bell; Cirkut; R. City; Amy Allen; Larrance Dopson	Everything I Thought It Was	2024	
"Infinity Sex"	Justin Timberlake; Angel López; Timbaland; Federico Vindver; James Fauntleroy; Calvin Harris	Everything I Thought It Was	2024	
"Innocent" (Justine Skye featuring Justin Timberlake)	Justin Timberlake; Justine Skye; Melissa Elliott; Terence DeCarlo Coles; Timothy Mosely	Space and Time	2021	
"I'm Lovin' It"	Pharrell Williams; Tom Batoy; Andreas Forberger; Franco Tortora	Live From London	2003	
"It's All Love" (with Anderson .Paak, George Clinton & Mary J. Blige	Anderson .Paak; James Fauntleroy; Joseph Shirley; Ludwig Göransson	Trolls World Tour Official Soundtrack	2020	
"Just Be" (DJ Khaled featuring Justin Timberlake)	Khaled Khaled; Justin Timberlake; Brittany Coney; Denisa Andrews; Nicholas Warwar; Tarrik Azzouz	Khaled Khaled	2021	
"Just Sing" (with Trolls World Tour Cast)	Justin Timberlake; Ludwig Göransson; Max Martin; Sarah Aarons; Solána Rowe	Trolls World Tour Official Soundtrack	2020	
"Last Night"	Justin Timberlake; Williams and Hugo	Justified	2002	
"Let the Groove Get In" (Note: "Let the Groove Get In" contains a sample from the recording "Alhamdulillahi" from the album Explorer Series: Africa-Burkina Faso – Rhythms of the Grasslands.)	Justin Timberlake; Timbaland; J-Roc; James Fauntleroy	The 20/20 Experience	2013	
"Let's Take a Ride"	Justin Timberlake; Williams and Hugo	Justified	2002	
"Liar" (featuring Fireboy DML)	Justin Timberlake; Fireboy DML; Kenyon Dixon; Danja; Atia Boggs; Amy Allen	Everything I Thought It Was	2024	
"Like I Love You" (featuring Clipse)	Justin Timberlake; Williams and Hugo	Justified	2002	
"Livin' Off the Land"	Justin Timberlake; Chad Hugo; Pharrell Williams	Man of the Woods	2018	
"Loose Ends" (Sérgio Mendes featuring Justin Timberlake, Pharoahe Monch and will.i.am)	will.i.am Alan Bergman; Marilyn Bergman; Sérgio Mendes; Justin Timberlake	Timeless	2006	
"Losing My Way"	Justin Timberlake; Timbaland; Danja	FutureSex/LoveSounds	2006	
"Love & War"	Justin Timberlake; Kenyon Dixon; Angel López; Timbaland; Federico Vindver; Larrance Dopson	Everything I Thought It Was	2024	
"Love Dealer" (Esmée Denters featuring Justin Timberlake)	Esmée Denters; Justin Timberlake; StarGate	Outta Here	2010	
"Love Don't Love Me"	Justin Timberlake; Mario Winans; P. Diddy; Anthony Nance; Antonio Dixon; Bryan James	Bad Boys II	2003	
"Love Never Felt So Good" (Note: "Love Never Felt So Good" samples Jackson's own song "Workin' Day and Night" (1979).) (Duet with Michael Jackson)	Michael Jackson; Paul Anka	Xscape	2014	
"Love Sex Magic" (Ciara featuring Justin Timberlake)	Justin Timberlake; James Fauntleroy; Rob Knox; Mike Elizondo	Fantasy Ride	2009	
"Love Train" (With Trolls Holiday cast)	Leon Huff; Kenneth Gamble	Trolls Holiday	2017	
"LoveStoned/I Think She Knows (Interlude)"	Justin Timberlake; Timbaland; Danja	FutureSex/LoveSounds	2006	
"Make it Right"	Foo Fighters	Concrete and Gold	2017	
"Man of the Woods"	Justin Timberlake; Chad Hugo; Pharrell Williams	Man of the Woods	2018	
"Memphis"	Justin Timberlake; Kenyon Dixon; Danja	Everything I Thought It Was	2024	
"Midnight Summer Jam"	Justin Timberlake; Chad Hugo; Pharrell Williams	Man of the Woods	2018	
"Mirrors"	Justin Timberlake; Timbaland; J-Roc; James Fauntleroy	The 20/20 Experience	2013	
"Money" (Matt Morris featuring Justin Timberlake)	Matt Morris	When Everything Breaks Open	2009	
"Montana"	Justin Timberlake; Chad Hugo; Pharrell Williams	Man of the Woods	2018	
"Morning Light" (featuring Alicia Keys)	Justin Timberlake; Alicia Keys; Eric Hudson; Rob Knox	Man of the Woods	2018	
"Motherlover" (The Lonely Island featuring Justin Timberlake)	The Lonely Island; Drew Campbell; Asa Taccone; Justin Timberlake	Turtleneck & Chain	2011	
"Murder" (featuring Jay-Z)	Justin Timberlake; Timbaland; Jay-Z; J-Roc; James Fauntleroy	The 20/20 Experience – 2 of 2	2013	
"My Favorite Drug"	Justin Timberlake; Louis Bell; Cirkut; R. City; Amy Allen; Douglas Ford	Everything I Thought It Was	2024	
"My Kind of Girl" (Brian McKnight featuring Justin Timberlake)	Brian McKnight	Superhero	2001	
"My Love" (featuring T.I.)	Justin Timberlake; Timbaland; Danja; T.I.	FutureSex/LoveSounds	2006	
"My Style" (The Black Eyed Peas featuring Justin Timberlake and Timbaland)	will.i.am apl.de.ap Fergie; Thomas Van Musser; Justin Timberlake; Timbaland; Danja	Monkey Business	2005	
"Never Again"	Justin Timberlake; Brian McKnight	Justified	2002	
"No Angels"	Justin Timberlake; Angel López; Federico Vindver; Calvin Harris	Everything I Thought It Was	2024	
"Not a Bad Thing"	Justin Timberlake; Timbaland; J-Roc; James Fauntleroy	The 20/20 Experience – 2 of 2	2013	
"Nothin' Else"	Justin Timberlake; Williams and Hugo	Justified	2002	
"(Oh No) What You Got"	Justin Timberlake; Timbaland	Justified	2002	
"Only When I Walk Away" (Note: "Only When I Walk Away" contains a sample from "Lustful", written and performed by Amedeo Minghi. The song also features additional vocals by Brenda Radney and James Fauntleroy.)	Justin Timberlake; Timbaland; J-Roc; James Fauntleroy; Amedeo Minghi	The 20/20 Experience – 2 of 2	2013	
"Pair of Wings"	Justin Timberlake	The 20/20 Experience – 2 of 2	2013	
"Paradise" (featuring NSYNC)	Justin Timberlake; Kenyon Dixon; Angel López; Timbaland; Federico Vindver	Everything I Thought It Was	2024	
"Parent Trap" (Jack Harlow featuring Justin Timberlake)	Jack Harlow; Justin Timberlake; Rogét Chahayed; Timothy Mosley; José Velazquez; Nima Jahanbin; Paimon Jahanbin; Dawoyne Lawson; Dorian Washington	Come Home the Kids Miss You	2022	
"Perfect for Me" (with Anna Kendrick in duet version)	Justin Timberlake; Kenyon Dixon; Ludwig Göransson	Trolls World Tour Official Soundtrack	2020	
"Play"	Justin Timberlake; Ryan Tedder; Michael Pollack; Danja; Federico Vindver; Zach Skelton; Andrew DeRoberts	Everything I Thought It Was	2024	
"Please Mr. Kennedy" (With Oscar Isaac and Adam Driver)	Ed Rush; George Cromarty; T Bone Burnett; Justin Timberlake; Joel and Ethan Coen	Inside Llewyn Davis	2013	
"Pose" (featuring Snoop Dogg)	Justin Timberlake will.i.am Snoop Dogg; Caleb Speir	FutureSex/LoveSounds	2006	
"Pusher Love Girl"	Justin Timberlake; Timbaland; J-Roc; James Fauntleroy	The 20/20 Experience	2013	
"Release" (Timbaland featuring Justin Timberlake)	Timbaland; Justin Timberlake; Craig Longmiles	Shock Value	2007	
"Right for Me"	Justin Timberlake; Timbaland	Justified	2002	
"Rock Your Body"	Justin Timberlake; Williams and Hugo	Justified	2002	
"Role Model" (FreeSol featuring Justin Timberlake)	Justin Timberlake; Elliott Ives; Frank Romano; Free; Jim Jonsin; Premo D'Anger; Rico Love; Rob Knox	Non-album single	2011	
"Sanctified" (featuring Tobe Nwigwe)	Justin Timberlake; Tobe Nwigwe; Kenyon Dixon; Rob Knox; Danja	Everything I Thought It Was	2024	
"Sauce"	Justin Timberlake; Danja; Elliott Ives; Timbaland	Man of the Woods	2018	
"Say Something" (featuring Chris Stapleton)	Justin Timberlake; Larrance Dopson; Danja; James Fauntleroy; Chris Stapleton	Man of the Woods	2018	
"Selfish"	Justin Timberlake; Amy Allen; Cirkut; Louis Bell; R. City	Everything I Thought It Was	2024	
"Señorita"	Justin Timberlake; Williams and Hugo	Justified	2002	
"September" (With Anna Kendrick and Earth, Wind & Fire)	Maurice White; Al McKay; Allee Willis	Trolls: Original Motion Picture Soundtrack	2016	
"Sexy Ladies/Let Me Talk to You (Prelude)"	Justin Timberlake; Timbaland; Danja	FutureSex/LoveSounds	2006	
"SexyBack"	Justin Timberlake; Timbaland; Danja	FutureSex/LoveSounds	2006	
"Shades" (Diddy – Dirty Money featuring Lil Wayne, Justin Timberlake, Bilal and James Fauntleroy)	Lil Wayne; Diddy; D'Mile; James Fauntleroy; Justin Timberlake	Last Train to Paris	2010	
"Signs" (Snoop Dogg featuring Justin Timberlake and Charlie Wilson)	Snoop Dogg; The Neptunes; L. Simmons; Rudy Taylor; Charlie Wilson	R&G: The Masterpiece	2005	
"Sin Fin" (Romeo Santos with Justin Timberlake)	Anthony Santos; Justin Timberlake; Floyd Nathaniel Hills; Richard Preston Butler; Alexander Caba	Formula, Vol. 3	2022	
"SoulMate"	James Fauntleroy; Paul Jeffries; Justin Timberlake; Brian Casey; Gary Smith; Lechas Young; Brandon Casey	Non-album single	2018	
"Spaceship Coupe"	Justin Timberlake; Timbaland; J-Roc; James Fauntleroy	The 20/20 Experience	2013	
"Stay With Me" (Calvin Harris featuring Justin Timberlake, Halsey & Pharrell Williams)	Calvin Harris; Justin Timberlake; James Fauntleroy; Pharrell Williams; Ashley Frangipane	Funk Wav Bounces Vol. 2	2022	
"Still on My Brain"	Justin Timberlake; The Underdogs	Justified	2002	
"Strawberry Bubblegum"	Justin Timberlake; Timbaland; J-Roc; James Fauntleroy	The 20/20 Experience	2013	
"Suit & Tie" (Note: "Suit & Tie" contains a portion of the composition "Sho' Nuff", written by Terrence Stubbs, Johnny Wilson and Charles Still.) (featuring Jay Z)	Justin Timberlake; Timbaland; J-Roc; Jay Z James Fauntleroy; Sly, Slick and Wicked	The 20/20 Experience	2013	
"Summer Love/Set the Mood (Prelude)"	Justin Timberlake; Timbaland; Danja	FutureSex/LoveSounds	2006	
"Supplies"	Justin Timberlake; Chad Hugo; Pharrell Williams	Man of the Woods	2018	
"Take Back the Night"	Justin Timberlake; Timbaland; J-Roc; James Fauntleroy	The 20/20 Experience – 2 of 2	2013	
"Take It from Here"	Justin Timberlake; Williams and Hugo	Justified	2002	
"Technicolor"	Justin Timberlake; Timbaland; Kenyon Dixon; Angel López; Federico Vindver; Larrance Dopson; Rio Root	Everything I Thought It Was	2024	
"That Girl" (Note: "That Girl" contains a sample from "Self Destruct" written by Noel Williams, as performed by King Sporty.)	Justin Timberlake; Timbaland; J-Roc; James Fauntleroy; King Sporty	The 20/20 Experience	2013	
"The Auld Triangle" (With Chris Thile, Chris Eldridge, Marcus Mumford and Gabe Witcher)	Dominic Behan	Inside Llewyn Davis	2013	
"The Holla-Day For You" (With Trolls Holiday cast)	Eric Goldman; Michael Corcoran; Killian Gray; David P. Smith	Trolls Holiday	2017	
"The Nature" (Talib Kweli featuring Justin Timberlake)	Talib Kweli; Justin Timberlake	Eardrum	2007	
"The Only Promise That Remains" (Reba McEntire and Justin Timberlake)	Matt Morris; Justin Timberlake	Reba: Duets	2007	
"The Other Side" (Justin Timberlake & SZA)	Justin Timberlake; Solána Rowe; Max Martin; Ludwig Göransson; Sarah Aarons	Trolls 2 World Tour: Official Soundtrack	2020	
"The Woods" (Juicy J featuring Justin Timberlake and Timbaland)	Justin Timberlake; Juicy J Timbaland	Stay Trippy	2013	
"TKO" (Note: "TKO" contains a sample from "Somebody's Gonna Off the Man", written and performed by Barry White.)	Justin Timberlake; Timbaland; J-Roc; James Fauntleroy; Barry White	The 20/20 Experience – 2 of 2	2013	
"Trolls Wanna Have Good Times" (with Trolls World Tour Cast)	Bernard Edwards; Christopher Hartz; Dmitry Brill; Herbie Hancock; Kenan Thompson; Lady Miss Kier; Ludwig Göransson	Trolls World Tour Official Soundtrack	2020	
"Trolls 2 Many Hits Mashup" (with Anna Kendrick, Icona Pop, James Corden & The Pop Trolls)	Anslem Douglas; Armando C. Perez; Donnie Wahlberg; Dan Hartman; Emma Bunton; Hyung; Jai-Sang; Jamahl Listenbee; Mark Wahlberg; Matt Rowe; Mel Brown; Melanie Chisholm	Trolls World Tour Official Soundtrack	2020	
"True Blood"	Justin Timberlake; Timbaland; J-Roc	The 20/20 Experience – 2 of 2	2013	
"True Colors"	Tom Kelly; Billy Steinberg	Trolls: Original Motion Picture Soundtrack	2016	
"Tunnel Vision"	Justin Timberlake; Timbaland; J-Roc; James Fauntleroy	The 20/20 Experience	2013	
"Until the End of Time" (Solo version and duet with Beyoncé)	Justin Timberlake; Timbaland; Danja	FutureSex/LoveSounds	2006	
"Wave"	Justin Timberlake; Chad Hugo; Pharrell Williams	Man of the Woods	2018	
"What Goes Around... Comes Around"	Justin Timberlake; Timbaland; Danja	FutureSex/LoveSounds	2006	
"What Lovers Do"	Justin Timberlake; Kenyon Dixon; Timbaland; Angel López; Federico Vindver; Larrance Dopson	Everything I Thought It Was	2024	
"What U Workin' With?" (With Gwen Stefani)	Justin Timberlake; Max Martin; Savan Kotecha; Oscar Holter; Peter Svensson; Ilya	Trolls: Original Motion Picture Soundtrack	2016	
"Where is the Love?" (Black Eyed Peas featuring Justin Timberlake)	will.i.am apl.de.ap Taboo; Justin Timberlake; Printz Board; Michael Fratantuno; George Pajon	Elephunk	2003	
"Why, When, How"	Justin Timberlake; Antonio Dixon; Anthony Nance	Justin & Christina	2003	
"Winner" (Jamie Foxx featuring Justin Timberlake and T.I.)	Justin Timberlake; James Fauntleroy; Rob Knox; T.I.	Best Night of My Life	2010	
"Work It" (Nelly featuring Justin Timberlake)	Nelly; Justin Timberlake; Jason "Jay E" Epperson	Nellyville	2002	
"Worthy Of" (Note: "Worthy Of" contains a sample from the composition "Float On", written by James Mitchell Jr., Marvin Willis and Arnold Ingram.)	Justin Timberlake; Carvin & Ivan; Frank Romano; Valvin Roane; James Mitchell Jr. Marvin Willis; Arnold Ingram	Justified	2002	
"Young Man"		Man of the Woods	2018	
"You Got It On"	Justin Timberlake; Timbaland; J-Roc; James Fauntleroy	The 20/20 Experience – 2 of 2	2013	

== Unreleased songs ==
Unreleased songs recorded by Justin Timberlake
Song	Other performer(s)	Writer(s)	Intended album	Leak	Ref.
"Across the Sky"	Madonna	Madonna; Timothy Mosley; Justin Timberlake; Nathaniel Hills	Hard Candy	Yes	
"Animal"	Madonna	Madonna; Timothy Mosley; Justin Timberlake; Nathaniel Hills	Hard Candy	Yes	
"Bank Robber"	James Fauntleroy	Justin Timberlake; James Fauntleroy; Timothy Mosley	—N/a	Yes	
"Battle of the Sexxxes"	Timbaland	Justin Timberlake; Timothy Mosley	—N/a	Yes	
"Been It"	Timbaland; Pharrell Williams	Timothy Mosley; Justin Timberlake; Pharrell Williams	Opera Noire	Yes	
"Crazy Girl"	Timbaland	Timothy Mosley; Justin Timberlake; Jerome Harmon	Shock Value II	Yes	
"Crowd Control"	Nelly Furtado	Nelly Furtado; Nathaniel Hills; Timothy Mosely; Justin Timberlake	Loose	No	
"Four Flat Tires / Lojack Love"	Kevin Abstract; Ryan Beatty	Clifford Ian Simpson; Justin Timberlake; Ryan Beatty; Jack Antonoff	Arizona Baby	Yes	
"Goodbye Homie"	Timbaland	Justin Timberlake; Chris Godbey; Jerome Harmon; Garland Mosley; Timothy Mosley	The 20/20 Experience	Yes	
"Hey Lil' Lady"	Sebastian; Timbaland	Garland Mosley; Timothy Mosley; Justin Timberlake; Brandon Deener	Cruel Intentions	Yes	
"I Heard Something"	Lil Wayne	Dwayne Carter Jr; Justin Timberlake	—N/a	Yes	
"If I"	T.I.	Justin Timberlake; Clifford Joseph Harris Jr. James Fauntleroy; Rob Knox	—N/a	Yes	
"Laugh At 'Em"	Timbaland; JAY-Z	Timothy Mosley; Justin Timberlake; Shawn Carter; Floyd Nathaniel Hills	Shock Value	Yes	
"Light Up"	Lil Wayne	Dwayne Carter Jr; Justin Timberlake	Tha Carter V	Yes	
"Nature of the World"	will.i.am	Justin Timberlake; William Adams	—N/a	Yes	
"No Sex for Ben"	The Rapture	Gabriel Andruzzi; Luke Jenner; Vito Roccoforte; Matt Safer; Timothy Mosley; Justin Timberlake	The Music of Grand Theft Auto IV	No	
"Sequel"	—N/a	Justin Timberlake; Timothy Mosley; James Fauntleroy; Jerome Harmon	The 20/20 Experience	Yes	
"Shadows"	—N/a	Justin Timberlake; Timothy Mosley	Everything I Thought It Was	Yes	
"Sinatra in the Sands"	JAY-Z; Nas; Timbaland	Shawn Carter; Nasir Jones; Justin Timberlake; Timothy Mosley; Jerome Harmon	NASIR	No	
"That's My Shit"	Tink; Timbaland	Trinity Laure'Ale Home; Timothy Mosley; Justin Timberlake	Think Tink	Yes	
"Trap Me Up"	T.I.	Clifford Joseph Harris Jr. Justin Timberlake; Aldrin Davis	Paperwork	Yes	
"Want You To Know"	Vanessa Marquez	Pharrell Williams; Chad Hugo	—N/a	Yes	
"The World Is Ours: AIDS Anthem"	Timbaland; Missy Elliott	Timothy Mosley; Missy Elliott; Justin Timberlake	—N/a	No	
"What's a Guy Gotta Do?"	—N/a	Chad Hugo; Justin Timberlake; Pharrell Williams	Justified	No	
"Yours"	Mariah Carey	Mariah Carey; James Harris III; Terry Lewis; Justin Timberlake; James Wright	Charmbracelet	No	

== See also ==
- Justin Timberlake discography
- NSYNC discography
