= Magna Carter World Tour =

2013–14 world concert tour by Jay-Z

- Tour by Jay-Z
- Location: North America • Europe
- Associated album: Magna Carta Holy Grail
- Start date: October 3, 2013
- End date: January 31, 2014
- Legs: 2
- No. of shows: 52
- Box office: US$48.9 million ($66.5 million in 2025 dollars)

Jay-Z concert chronology
- Legends of the Summer (2013); Magna Carter World Tour (2013–14); On the Run Tour (2014)

The Magna Carter World Tour was a concert tour by American rapper Jay-Z. It was promoted by his twelfth studio album Magna Carta Holy Grail (2013). Following his headlining performance at the 2013 Wireless Festival, Jay Z and promoters Live Nation announced a European and North American headlining tour. The venture was Jay Z's first solo headlining tour in almost four years, following 2009's Fall Tour. According to Pollstar, The tour earned total $48.9m from 52 shows.

== Background ==
On February 22, 2013, Jay Z and Justin Timberlake announced their co-headlining Legends of the Summer Tour Initially this tour was speculated to be in promotion of Timberlake's new album The 20/20 Experience and comeback to music, and was to only feature Jay Z's previous hits. However, on July 24, 2013, Jay Z released his twelfth studio album Magna Carta Holy Grail. Rumors begun of a solo headlining tour from Jay Z to support the new album and on July 26, 2013, the Magna Carter World Tour was officially announced.

Jay Z, along with Chris Martin and Timbaland, took the London Underground from Waterloo tube station to the O2 Arena, where he performed his third consecutive show in London on October 12, 2013.

On November 1, Jay-Z and Timbaland performed in Abu Dhabi, United Arab Emirates at du Arena, as part of the F1 Grand Prix After-Race concert. The set list was the same as his European shows, though this wasn't part of the tour. There was a power-cut in the middle of the show, where Timbaland beat-boxed to improvise for the 37,000 fans.

== Critical reception ==
The opening night of the tour received positive reviews from critics. Katie Fitzpatrick, from Manchester Evening News gave the performance 4 out of 5 stars, stating "If we aren't arm waving along to modern anthems such as 99 Problems and Empire State of Mind, we're standing with respectful attention as though we're beholding a life-altering church sermon." Nick Hasted from The Independent also gave the opening concert 4 out of 5 stars. He explained "Regularly tonight, he goes further, breaking down his wall of hip-hop sound for bursts of a cappella rapping. It's the bare, breathing sound of one man's talent, preciously rare at an arena show. His new, twelfth album, Magna Carta Holy Grail, wrestles with the challenges of fame and celebrity family, trying to make them as compelling as the drug-dealing street life he left behind in Brooklyn long ago. But while he's on stage, those contradictions melt away."

Rave reviews continued throughout the European leg of the tour. Ed Power from The Telegraph, who attended the first show in Dublin concluded his review with "A tough guy with a gooey centre, little about Jay-Z's swagger is especially original but he carries it off better than anyone else in the game." He went on to give the performance 4 out of 5 stars. At the first of his 4 back to back London O_{2} Arena shows, Hannah Britt from the Daily Express opened her praising review with "With a sea of screaming fans holding their palms up towards him, you'd never know that Jay Z once dealt crack cocaine on the streets of Brooklyn." and continued to positively speak on the rappers personality, stating "With a confidence that comes with being a highly respected artist, married to Beyoncé and mind-blowingly minted, he seemed as comfortable talking to the crowd as I would be sat on my living room sofa. Picking people from the audience at random, he thanked them for being there. It was a nice touch, adding a sense of humility to his on-stage persona." However, Alicia Adejobi from Entertainment Wise who attended the same show questioned whether the hip hop mogul could still hold a crowd on his own (after touring respectively for the past two years with collaborators Kanye West and Justin Timberlake). She concluded with a mixed review of the show stating "Perhaps we're so used to seeing him on stage with the likes of Kanye, Justin Timberlake and even his wife Beyonce, but it felt as though something was slightly missing from the night. It's clear from the frequent breaks and interludes that Jay Z just simply isn't as energetic as he once was in his 20s"

== Commercial performance ==
Due to the "phenomenal" demand as well as all dates in the United Kingdom selling out, promoters added second shows in Manchester and London. Ticket prices for the UK leg ranged between £42-£78. Other sources reported that some of the UK dates had sold out within "seconds" with website Mirror.co.uk joking "[Jay Z] tickets are fast turning into the Holy Grail" (a pun based on the rappers hit song with Justin Timberlake). On September 6, 2013, a second leg of the tour was announced, to take place in North America during December 2013/early 2014. The tour was #57 most successful tour in Pollstar's 2013 year end top 100 worldwide tour, with $31.2m gross from 33 shows. also on their 2014 mid year top 100 North American tours, tour was #14 with $17.7m gross from 19 shows. Based on those Pollstar Reports, the Tour earned $48.9m from 52 Shows from 2013 to 2014.

== Broadcasts and recordings ==
A promotional video for the tour was released by Live Nation's official YouTube account to promote the original ticket sales of the tour. The video showed footage from Jay Z's headlining performance at the 2013 Wireless Festival, including footage of the large crowd and him on stage (although no performances of songs were included)

== Support acts ==
- Timbaland

== Set list ==
This set list is representative of the first show in London. It does not represent all concerts for the duration of the tour.

1. "U Don't Know"
2. "Crown"
3. "On to the Next One"
4. "Holy Grail"
5. "FuckWithMeYouKnowIGotIt"
6. "Beach Is Better"
7. "99 Problems"
8. "Big Pimpin'"
9. "Picasso Baby"
10. "Tom Ford"
11. "Dirt off Your Shoulder"
12. "Somewhereinamerica"
13. "Nigga What, Nigga Who (Originator 99)"
14. "Pound Cake"
15. "I Just Wanna Love U (Give It 2 Me)"
16. "Niggas in Paris"
17. "Public Service Announcement"
18. "Clique"
19. "Run This Town"

Encore

20. "Encore"
21. "Empire State of Mind"
22. "Izzo (H.O.V.A.)" / "Hard Knock Life (Ghetto Anthem)"
23. "Young Forever"

Notes

- On October 11 and 12, 2013, Chris Martin joined Jay Z on stage to perform "Ain't No Love (In The Heart Of The City)" together.
- On January 2, 2014, Jay Z brought out Rick Ross in concert.

== Shows ==
List of concerts, showing date, city, country, venue, opening act, tickets sold, number of available tickets and amount of gross revenue
| Date | City | Country | Venue | Opening act | Attendance | Revenue |
Europe
| October 3, 2013 | Manchester | England | Phones 4u Arena | Timbaland | 18,722 / 21,931 | $1,774,570 |
| October 4, 2013 | Manchester | England | Phones 4u Arena | Timbaland | 18,722 / 21,931 | $1,774,570 |
| October 6, 2013 | Dublin | Ireland | 3Arena | Timbaland | —N/a | —N/a |
| October 8, 2013 | Birmingham | England | Barclaycard Arena | Timbaland | —N/a | —N/a |
| October 10, 2013 | London | England | The O_{2} Arena | Timbaland | 56,652 / 66,952 | $5,600,680 |
| October 11, 2013 | London | England | The O_{2} Arena | Timbaland | 56,652 / 66,952 | $5,600,680 |
| October 12, 2013 | London | England | The O_{2} Arena | Timbaland | 56,652 / 66,952 | $5,600,680 |
| October 14, 2013 | London | England | The O_{2} Arena | Timbaland | 56,652 / 66,952 | $5,600,680 |
| October 17, 2013 | Paris | France | AccorHotels Arena | Timbaland | —N/a | —N/a |
| October 18, 2013 | Paris | France | AccorHotels Arena | Timbaland | —N/a | —N/a |
| October 20, 2013 | Zürich | Switzerland | Hallenstadion | Timbaland | 10,583 / 13,000 | $1,229,150 |
| October 21, 2013 | Antwerp | Belgium | Sportpaleis | Timbaland | —N/a | —N/a |
| October 23, 2013 | Oslo | Norway | Oslo Spektrum | Timbaland | —N/a | —N/a |
| October 25, 2013 | Stockholm | Sweden | Ericsson Globe | Timbaland | —N/a | —N/a |
| October 27, 2013 | Hamburg | Germany | Barclaycard Arena Hamburg | Timbaland | 8,960 / 12,286 | $737,820 |
| October 28, 2013 | Cologne | Germany | Lanxess Arena | Timbaland | —N/a | —N/a |
| October 29, 2013 | Amsterdam | Netherlands | Ziggo Dome | Timbaland | —N/a | —N/a |
North America
| November 30, 2013 | Saint Paul | United States | Xcel Energy Center | Timbaland | —N/a | —N/a |
| December 1, 2013 | Lincoln | United States | Pinnacle Bank Arena | Timbaland | —N/a | —N/a |
| December 2, 2013 | Denver | United States | Pepsi Center | Timbaland | —N/a | —N/a |
| December 6, 2013 | Anaheim | United States | Honda Center | Timbaland | —N/a | —N/a |
| December 7, 2013 | San Diego | United States | Valley View Casino Center | Timbaland | —N/a | —N/a |
| December 9, 2013 | Los Angeles | United States | Staples Center | —N/a | 13,380 / 13,380 | $1,351,069 |
| December 10, 2013 | Fresno | United States | Save Mart Center | —N/a | 6,735 / 9,627 | $470,710 |
| December 11, 2013 | San Jose | United States | SAP Center at San Jose | Timbaland | —N/a | —N/a |
| December 13, 2013 | Las Vegas | United States | Mandalay Bay Events Center | Timbaland | —N/a | —N/a |
| December 14, 2013 | Las Vegas | United States | Mandalay Bay Events Center | Timbaland | —N/a | —N/a |
| December 18, 2013 | Oklahoma City | United States | Chesapeake Energy Arena | Timbaland | —N/a | —N/a |
| December 19, 2013 | Houston | United States | Toyota Center | Timbaland | —N/a | —N/a |
| December 20, 2013 | San Antonio | United States | AT&T Center | Timbaland | —N/a | —N/a |
| December 21, 2013 | Dallas | United States | American Airlines Center | Timbaland | 11,713 / 12,808 | $966,269 |
| December 27, 2013 | Atlanta | United States | Philips Arena | —N/a | 14,533 / 14,533 | $1,207,942 |
| December 28, 2013 | Birmingham | United States | BJCC Arena | Timbaland | —N/a | —N/a |
| January 2, 2014 | Sunrise | United States | BB&T Center | Timbaland | —N/a | —N/a |
| January 4, 2014 | Charlotte | United States | Time Warner Cable Arena | Timbaland | —N/a | —N/a |
| January 5, 2014 | Greensboro | United States | Greensboro Coliseum | Timbaland | —N/a | —N/a |
| January 8, 2014 | Cleveland | United States | Quicken Loans Arena | Timbaland | —N/a | —N/a |
| January 9, 2014 | Chicago | United States | United Center | Timbaland | —N/a | —N/a |
| January 10, 2014 | Auburn Hills | United States | The Palace of Auburn Hills | —N/a | —N/a | —N/a |
| January 12, 2014 | Brooklyn | United States | Barclays Center | —N/a | 26,079 / 26,079 | $3,158,563 |
| January 13, 2014 | Brooklyn | United States | Barclays Center | —N/a | 26,079 / 26,079 | $3,158,563 |
| January 16, 2014 | Washington, D.C. | United States | Verizon Center | —N/a | 12,207 / 12,774 | $1,259,563 |
| January 17, 2014 | Uncasville | United States | Mohegan Sun Arena | —N/a | 6,133 / 6,441 | $880,727 |
| January 18, 2014 | Boston | United States | TD Garden | Timbaland | —N/a | —N/a |
| January 19, 2014 | Uniondale | United States | Nassau Coliseum | —N/a | —N/a | —N/a |
| January 21, 2014 | Pittsburgh | United States | CONSOL Energy Center | Timbaland | —N/a | —N/a |
| January 22, 2014 | Newark | United States | Prudential Center | —N/a | 9,914 / 9,914 | $773,131 |
| January 24, 2014 | Montreal | Canada | Bell Centre | —N/a | 11,282 / 11,282 | $1,007,060 |
| January 27, 2014 | Toronto | Canada | Air Canada Centre | —N/a | 14,149 / 14,149 | $1,309,200 |
| January 29, 2014 | Philadelphia | United States | Wells Fargo Center | —N/a | 13,266 / 13,266 | $1,104,466 |
| January 30, 2014 | Buffalo | United States | First Niagara Center | Timbaland | —N/a | —N/a |
| January 31, 2014 | State College | United States | Bryce Jordan Center | Timbaland | —N/a | —N/a |
| Total | | | | | 234,308 / 258,422 (90%) | $22,830,920 |
