= Heaven (Jay-Z song) =

Song by Jay-Z featuring Justin Timberlake

from the album Magna Carta Holy Grail
- Released: July 4, 2013
- Recorded: 2013
- Genre: Hip hop
- Length: 4:03
- Label: Roc-A-Fella; Roc Nation; Universal
- Songwriter(s): Justin Timberlake; Shawn Carter; Terius Nash; Timothy Mosley; Jerome Harmon; William Berry; Peter Buck; Mike Mills; Michael Stipe; Adrian Younge
- Producer(s): Timbaland; J-Roc

"Heaven" is a song recorded by American rapper Jay-Z for his twelfth studio album Magna Carta Holy Grail (2013), featuring American recording artist Justin Timberlake. The song was written by Jay-Z, Timberlake, The-Dream, R.E.M., Adrian Younge, Timbaland, and J-Roc, while the production was handled by the latter two. It touches on subjects of religious allegory and an interrogation of organized religion. The song has since peaked at number 10 on the Billboard Bubbling Under Hot 100 Singles.

== Background ==
On "Heaven", Jay-Z questions the meaning of religion and once again shoots down rumors that he is part of the secret organization Illuminati. He explained the song in a promotional video for Samsung, saying,

"No matter what religion you are, accept the other people's idea. Because, have you ever been to heaven? This song is toying with the idea of it being on Heaven or Hell on earth. My idea of being on Heaven is in your daughter's laughter. Hell could be if your child missing's for three minutes; you in three minutes of Hell."

The song indulges in religious allegory, and is one of the few songs on Magna Carta Holy Grail that touches upon existential and spiritual themes. Throughout the song he ponders faith, superstition and free thinking.

The songs features Jay-Z rapping a lyric of rock band R.E.M.'s 1991 single "Losing My Religion". Following the album's release, former frontman of R.E.M. Michael Stipe told NME that he was "thrilled" and that it was a "great honor" that Jay-Z included the lyrics in one of his songs.

== Release and promotion ==
On June 25, 2013, "Heaven" became the second song from Magna Carta Holy Grail (after the lead single "Holy Grail") to have its partial lyrics revealed by the JAY Z MAGNA CARTA App via Samsung. On June 27, 2013, Jay-Z released a video via the same app of him discussing the song in depth with superproducer Rick Rubin.

== Critical reception ==
"Heaven" was met with generally positive reviews, with most critics praising it over the hit lead single, another Jay-Z/Justin Timberlake collaboration, "Holy Grail". Ian Cohen of Pitchfork praised the song as one of the album's strong points, stating, "Heaven" is the most thought-provoking spiritual meditation [Jay-Z's] written, and the willful misreading of "Losing My Religion" is used to powerful effect. David Weiss of Paste credited "Heaven" for setting off the most interesting section of the album, ending at the Beyoncé-featuring "Part II (On the Run)". Del F. Cowie of Exclaim! said the song's production "sounded like a long-lost Wu-Tang instrumental somehow bereft of an Inspectah Deck verse." Randall Roberts of the Los Angeles Times praised the song's production by Timbaland, saying: "The producer and rapper move with the coordination of expert magicians juggling Champagne bottles and knives."

Louis Pattison of NME gave a more mixed review, related to Jay-Z not taking full advantage of the subject matter. Grant Jones of RapReviews said of the song: "The piercing "Heaven" starts off well, with an intriguing defense of Illuminati rumours from Jay, but shortly falls back on his lavish lifestyle, using Maybachs and Lamborghinis as metaphors for angels." In a negative review, Colin McGuire of PopMatters called the R.E.M. sample awkward and cheesy. Mike Diver of Clash also discredited Jay-Z for not taking advantage of the "rich imagery" of the R.E.M. sample.

== Charts ==
Chart (2013)	Peak position
US Bubbling Under Hot 100 (Billboard)	10
US Hot R&B/Hip-Hop Songs (Billboard)	46
