= Tom Ford (song) =

Song by Jay-Z

Single by Jay-Z

from the album Magna Carta Holy Grail
- Released: September 26, 2013
- Recorded: 2013
- Genre: Hip hop; East Coast hip hop
- Length: 3:09
- Label: Roc-A-Fella; Roc Nation; Universal
- Songwriters: Shawn Carter; Timothy Mosley; Jerome Harmon
- Producers: J-Roc; Timbaland

Jay-Z singles chronology
"Pound Cake" (2013)	"Tom Ford" (2013)	"Know Bout Me" (2013)

"Tom Ford" is a song by American hip hop artist Jay-Z from his twelfth studio album Magna Carta Holy Grail (2013). It features additional vocals from his wife Beyoncé as Third Ward Trill and was produced by Timbaland and Jerome "J-Roc" Harmon. On September 26, 2013, "Tom Ford" was serviced to urban contemporary radio in the United Kingdom as the album's second single and then on October 15, 2013, to rhythmic contemporary in the United States. Following the release of the album, the song peaked at number 39 on the US Billboard Hot 100.

== Background ==
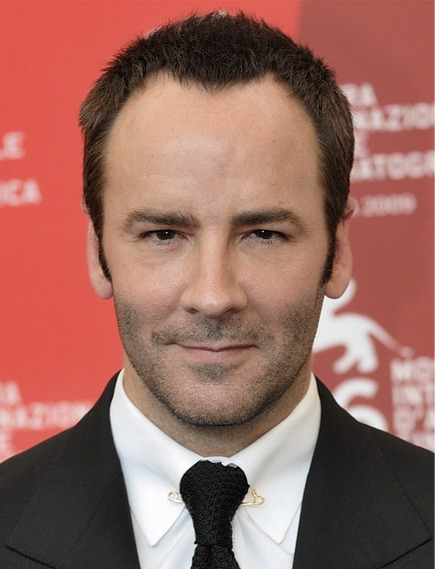
Fashion designer Tom Ford, who is mentioned throughout the song.

On July 3, 2013, "Tom Ford" was previewed in one of Samsung's commercials for Magna Carta Holy Grail. "Tom Ford" premiered online the following day, along with the rest of Magna Carta Holy Grail upon its release to Samsung smartphone owners.

The title of the song and chorus are a reference to fashion designer Tom Ford, who was also mentioned by Justin Timberlake in his Jay-Z collaboration "Suit & Tie". Tom Ford responded favorably to the song saying, "Who would not be flattered to have an entire Jay-Z track named after them? I mean, come on, it's pretty rare that something like that happens. It's a kind of validation of one's work, as it means that one has really penetrated and made an impact on popular culture." Following its release, Tom Ford received a huge spike in online search engine queries.

== Production ==
The song was produced by Timbaland and Jerome "J-Roc" Harmon. The song's production begins with influences of Radiohead's "Kid A" and transitions into blasts of "synthesizers and bubbling rhythm". The rest of the beat is constructed out of "machine gun sprays, Nintendo themes and bottle blows." It also features vocals by Beyoncé, credited as Third Ward Trill, on the outro to the song.

== Critical reception ==
"Tom Ford" was met with mixed to positive reviews from music critics. Colin McGuire of PopMatters called the song one of the album's highlights saying, "Timbaland's production is the key here, his trademark bounce fueling the engine of this swift, far-out ride. Adding to the trip is Hov's ability to change his flow on a dime, reminding everyone of how easy he can make the hardest things appear." Kitty Empire of The Guardian praised the song calling it, "a juicy cut from Jay-Z's entertaining 13th-odd album. In it, Jay-Z is in a youthful, playground taunt mode, flaunting his wealth as per his own brand requirements. The production – sonar bloops, arpeggiating shivers and tickly beats – grabs the ear even harder."

Mike Madden of Consequence of Sound called the song "a relatively bare track dominated by Jay's emphatic flow", also naming it one of the album's "essential tracks." DJBooth.net praised the song's booming bass and stuttering high-hats. Ian Cohen of Pitchfork also praised the song's production.

Simon Vozick-Levinson of Rolling Stone gave the song a negative review saying, "Tom Ford" might mark the lyrical nadir of Jay-Z's catalog. He sounds bored half to death by the basic rhyme, listlessly repeating the designer's name like it's going to magically transform into a clever or catchy hook. It hurts to see him waste a primo Timbaland beat like this." Kyle Anderson of Entertainment Weekly called the song "embarrassing, and not just because everybody — even Clipse — abandoned trap music years ago." Jesse Cataldo of Slant Magazine said the song was full of, "pure, empty name-checking". Dan Weiss of Paste put down the song for being hard for the average listener to connect to.

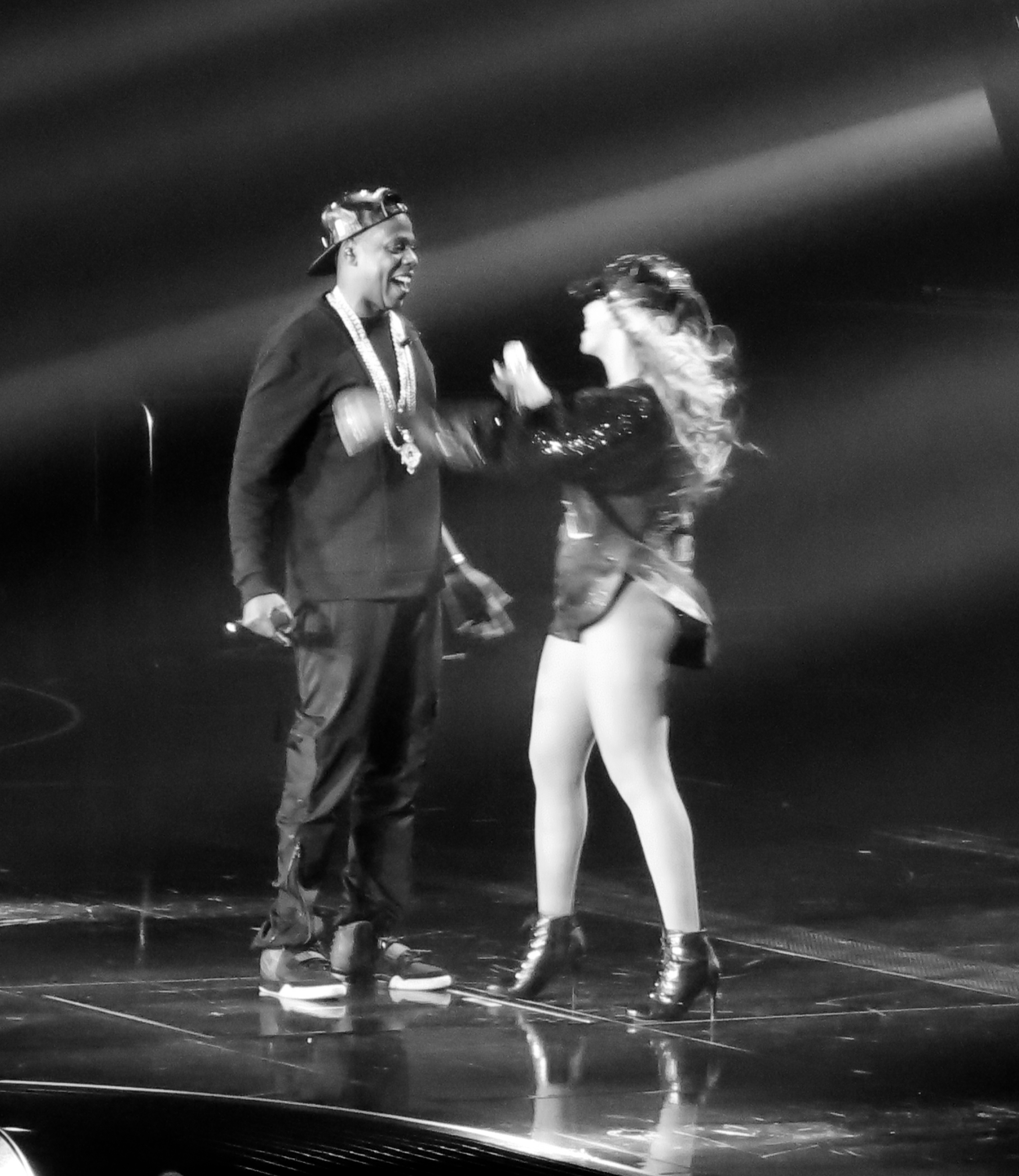
Jay-Z embraces wife Beyoncé after his performance of "Tom Ford" during The Mrs. Carter Show World Tour, 2013

Rolling Stone ranked "Tom Ford" at number 77 on their list of the 100 Best Songs of 2013. They commented saying, "It might be his most lavish playa anthem ever, the work of man who has traded street corners for runways but can still pull off a line like "flush out a Riesling/When Hov's out them hoes out/Y'all put y'all weaves in."

== Live performances ==
On August 5, 2013, Beyoncé played her final North American Mrs. Carter Show World Tour show at Brooklyn's Barclays Center, at which she brought out Jay-Z to perform "Tom Ford" for the first time. Jay-Z also performed "Tom Ford" throughout his Legends of the Summer Stadium Tour in 2013. He also performed the single throughout his Magna Carter World Tour, that took place from October 2013 to January 31, 2014.

== Remixes ==
On December 4, 2013, Jay-Z released the official remix to "Tom Ford" on his 44th birthday featuring deceased rapper Pimp C. Coincidentally, or perhaps intentionally, this was also the sixth anniversary of Pimp C's passing. The two had previously collaborated during his life, on the hit song "Big Pimpin'".

On September 4, 2013, Ghanaian rapper Sarkodie freestyled to "Tom Ford" on BBC Radio's Tim Westwood TV. On October 15, 2013, rapper Angel Haze released a freestyle to "Tom Ford" as part of her "30 Gold Freestyle" series.

== Accolades ==
Year	Ceremony	Award	Result
2014	Grammy Awards (56th)	Best Rap Performance	Nominated

== Chart performance ==
=== Weekly charts ===
Chart (2013)	Peak position
UK Singles (Official Charts)	164
UK Hip Hop/R&B (Official Charts)	22
US Billboard Hot 100	39
US Hot R&B/Hip-Hop Songs (Billboard)	11
US Rhythmic Airplay (Billboard)	6
US Hot Rap Songs (Billboard)	8

=== Year-end charts ===
Chart (2013)	Position
US Hot R&B/Hip-Hop Songs (Billboard)	49
US Rap Songs (Billboard)	36
Chart (2014)	Position
US Hot R&B/Hip-Hop Songs (Billboard)	93
US Rhythmic (Billboard)	50

== Certifications ==
Region	Certification	Certified units/sales
United States (RIAA)	Platinum	1,000,000^{‡}
^{‡} Sales+streaming figures based on certification alone.

== Release history ==
Region	Date	Format	Label(s)
United Kingdom	September 26, 2013	Urban contemporary radio	Roc Nation; Roc-A-Fella; Universal
United States	October 15, 2013	Rhythmic contemporary radio	Roc Nation; Roc-A-Fella; Universal
United Kingdom	October 21, 2013	Contemporary hit radio	Roc Nation; Roc-A-Fella; Universal
