= FuckWithMeYouKnowIGotIt =

Song by Jay-Z featuring Rick Ross

from the album Magna Carta Holy Grail
- Released: July 4, 2013
- Genre: Dirty rap; trap
- Length: 4:03
- Label: Roc-A-Fella; Roc Nation; Universal
- Songwriters: Shawn Corey Carter; William Leonard Roberts; Matthew Jehu Samuels; Anderson Hernandez; Timothy Zachery Mosley; Jerome Harmon
- Producers: Boi-1da; Vinylz; Timbaland; J-Roc

"FuckWithMeYouKnowIGotIt" (alternatively written and stylized as "Fuckwithmeyouknowigotit") is a song by rapper Jay-Z recorded for his 12th studio album Magna Carta Holy Grail. The song features Def Jam labelmate rapper Rick Ross. The song was produced by the Toronto, Canada producer Boi-1da, Vinylz, Timbaland and J-Roc. The song peaked at number 64 on the U.S. Billboard Hot 100. Complex ranked "FuckWithMeYouKnowIGotIt" number 20 on their list of the 50 best songs of 2013. David Ortiz of the Boston Red Sox used the song as his batter intro while stepping onto the field.

== Production ==
The instrumental for "FuckWithMeYouKnowIGotIt" was started by Vinylz who was inspired by a Pimp C speech he found on YouTube. He sampled his voice for the intro and then created the rest of the song in "like five minutes." After fellow producer Boi-1da did some more work on it, it was sent to Rick Ross who intended to use it for his album, Mastermind. Jay-Z was supposed to add a guest verse to it, but when he heard the instrumental, he wanted the track for his album. Timbaland added additional changes to it before the final version was created for the album. Most of Jay-Z's verse was reused from "Living So Italian", an unreleased song from his and Kanye West's collaborative album Watch the Throne. Rick Ross, however, recorded a solo version, dubbed "You Know I Got It (Reprise)," for his album Mastermind as a deluxe edition bonus track in 2014.

== Chart performance ==
=== Weekly charts ===
Chart (2013)	Peak position
US Billboard Hot 100	64
US Hot R&B/Hip-Hop Songs (Billboard)	24

=== Year-end charts ===
Chart (2013)	Position
US Hot R&B/Hip-Hop Songs (Billboard)	73

== Certifications ==
Region	Certification	Certified units/sales
United States (RIAA)	Platinum	1,000,000^{‡}
^{‡} Sales+streaming figures based on certification alone.
