= Picasso Baby =

Song by Jay-Z

from the album Magna Carta... Holy Grail
- Released: July 4, 2013
- Recorded: 2012–2013
- Genre: Hip hop; East Coast hip hop
- Length: 4:05
- Label: Roc-A-Fella; Roc Nation; Universal
- Songwriters: Shawn Carter; Timothy Mosley; Jerome Harmon; Adrian Younge
- Producers: Timbaland; Jerome "J-Roc" Harmon

Music video
- "Picasso Baby: A Performance Art Film" on YouTube

"Picasso Baby" is a song by American hip hop artist Jay-Z from his twelfth studio album Magna Carta... Holy Grail. It is the second track on the album and features additional vocals by The-Dream and Zofia Borucka Moreno. The song was produced by Timbaland and Jerome "J-Roc" Harmon and contains a sample of "Sirens" by Adrian Younge. Following the release of the album, the song peaked at number 91 on the Billboard Hot 100 based on downloads only.

== Background and recording ==
After collaborating on The Blueprint 3 in 2009, Timbaland and Jay-Z parted ways due to creative differences, but reunited again while working with Justin Timberlake on The 20/20 Experience. When Beyoncé Knowles started working on her next studio album in late 2012, Jay-Z invited Timbaland to handle some of the production on it. While both in the studio, Timbaland played Jay the instrumental for "Picasso Baby". At the time, Jay-Z didn't have plans to record a whole album, but after they made the song, the two decided to "go for it". In an interview with BBC Radio 1, Jay-Z stated that "Picasso Baby" "built the sound of" Magna Carta... Holy Grail and Timbaland ended up handling most of the production on the album. According to Jay-Z, while the two have recorded many songs in the past, it was not until MCHG that they got "the chemistry" to collaborate for a whole project.

Producer J-Roc described "Picasso Baby" as "just New York". He told XXL that he and Timbaland "were really just feeling the city, the energy that it gives out" and were inspired by the "numerous different cultures and different dialects or sounds."

Adrian Younge, whose song "Sirens" was sampled to create the instrumental, commented that he was "very happy [with how it came out]." Despite usually being critical of how people sample his music, Young thought that "especially for 'Picasso Baby', they literally just looped the top, and it worked. Sometimes you just do a loop and it just works."

== Composition ==
"Picasso Baby" makes many references to popular artists such as Pablo Picasso, Mark Rothko, Jeff Koons, Francis Bacon, Jean-Michel Basquiat, and Andy Warhol, as well as world-famous painting Mona Lisa.

== Music video ==
The music video for the song, titled "Picasso Baby: A Performance Art Film" was shot on July 10, 2013, at the Pace Gallery in New York City. The video, directed by Mark Romanek, was inspired by the work of performance artist Marina Abramović and in particular by her 2010 installation "The Artist Is Present". In the video, Jay-Z is on a central stage and people queue to get the chance of having him perform the song with them. The shoot was attended by director Judd Apatow, rapper Wale, Performa Director and Chief Curator RoseLee Goldberg, as well as artists Laurie Simmons, Rashid Johnson, Jerry Saltz, Marilyn Minter, Fred Wilson, Jacolby Satterwhite, Glenn O'Brien, Andres Serrano, Lawrence Weiner, and Marina Abramović herself, among many other "important figures from the gallery and sales side of fine art." On August 2, 2013, the music video premiered on HBO at 11 p.m. EST.

Picasso Baby: A Performance Art Film was nominated for Best Music Video at the 56th Annual Grammy Awards, where it lost to the music video for Jay-Z's collaboration with Justin Timberlake, "Suit & Tie."

=== Controversy with Abramović ===
After her involvement in "Picasso Baby: A Performance Art Film", Abramović told in an interview that the rapper had used her. She claimed Jay Z never fulfilled his promise to make a donation to the Marina Abramović Institute in return of her grant to use "The Artist is Present" concept and her own appearance in the video. Jay Z then replied he had made the donation. In the end, the Institute issued a statement apologizing to both the rapper and Abramović because they never informed the performance artist of the donation.

== Critical reception ==
Rolling Stone ranked "Picasso Baby" at number 19, on their list of the 100 Best Songs of 2013, calling it "the standout track from Jay Z's lackluster Magna Carta... Holy Grail". NPR also listed "Picasso Baby" as one of their 100 favorite songs of 2013, praising in particular the production work of Timbaland.

== Charts ==
Chart (2013)	Peak position
US Billboard Hot 100	91
US Hot R&B/Hip-Hop Songs (Billboard)	34
