= Part II (On the Run) =

Single by Jay-Z featuring Beyoncé

from the album Magna Carta Holy Grail
- Released: February 18, 2014
- Studio: Oven Studios (New York, NY)
- Genre: Hip hop; electro-R&B
- Length: 5:33
- Label: Roc-A-Fella; Roc Nation; Universal
- Songwriters: Shawn Carter; James Fauntleroy; Timothy Mosley; Jerome Harmon; Beyoncé Knowles
- Producers: Timbaland; J-Roc

Jay-Z singles chronology
"The Devil Is a Lie" (2013)	"Part II (On the Run)" (2014)	"They Don't Love You No More" (2014)

Beyoncé singles chronology
"XO" / "Drunk in Love" (2013)	"Part II (On the Run)" (2014)	"Partition" (2014)

"Part II (On the Run)" is a song recorded by American rapper Jay-Z from his twelfth studio album Magna Carta Holy Grail (2013) featuring American singer-songwriter Beyoncé. The song was written by Jay-Z, James Fauntleroy, Timbaland, and J-Roc while the production was handled by the latter two. It is viewed as a sequel to Beyoncé and Jay-Z's 2002 collaboration "'03 Bonnie & Clyde", a song which was rumored to be about their relationship. "Part II (On the Run)" is a slow-tempo Electro-R&B ballad instrumentally complete with synths and drums, and its lyrics refer to a rebellious couple in love and describe their dangerous relationship.

The song charted at numbers 93 and 81 on the UK Singles Chart and US Billboard Hot 100, respectively, based on downloads alone, following the release of Magna Carta Holy Grail. It was sent to U.S. contemporary hit radio stations as the third single to be released from the album on February 18, 2014.

== Background ==
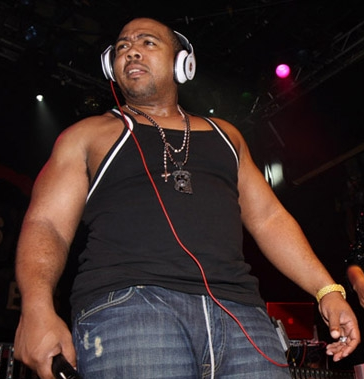
Timbaland (pictured) served as one of the producers of the song.

"Part II (On the Run)" was written by Jay-Z, James Fauntleroy, Timbaland and J-Roc, while the production was handled by the latter two. It contains a sample of "Believe in Me" by American band One Way and Jay-Z uses Juvenile's "Back That Azz Up" flow when he rhymes "Push your ma'fucka wig back, I did that/I been wilding since a Juve." "Part II (On the Run)" is viewed as a sequel to Beyoncé and Jay-Z's collaboration "'03 Bonnie & Clyde" (2002), when rumors about the pair dating started, as before that neither artist had never talked about it. The lyrics of the song were revealed by Jay-Z prior to its official release on June 27, 2013 thru a Samsung smartphone application. However, on July 4, 2013, the song leaked on the Internet prior to its official premiere.

"Part II (On the Run)" was sent to U.S. contemporary hit radio stations on February 18, 2014 as the third single to be released from Magna Carta Holy Grail.

== Composition ==
"Part II (On the Run)" is a smooth slow-tempo electro-R&B love ballad which is equipped with a steamy, retro and retro-futuristic groove that creates an acute level of moody texture. It is instrumentally complete with keyboards and drums. Jon Pareles, a writer of The New York Times noted that it was the closest song to pop music on Magna Carta Holy Grail. Pareles further noted that Timbaland's production sets aside his usual brittle tones to hint at the keyboard confections of 1980's Lionel Richie and Don Henley. Lyrically, the song speaks about a rebellious couple that is desperately in love. The song opens with an airy prelude during which Beyoncé sings the lines, "Who wants that perfect love story anyway anyway / Cliché cliché cliché. Who wants that hero love that saves the day anyway, cliché cliché cliché" in dreamy lead vocals along with breathy harmonies. Jay-Z and Beyoncé further trade verses about fugitives finding romance, with Beyoncé singing, "I hear sirens while we make love" and slowly exhaling in the song, singing in her lower register, swearing that she can still hold her lover's heart and gun. She further denounces the couple's own love story as "a toast to clichés in a dark past" over dizzy, diving synths and drums which sound like "they came out of Eric B's basement," as stated by Grant Jones of the website Rap Reviews. With the lines: "If it's you and me against the world/ Then so be it," Jay-Z notes the criticism towards the couple when they first went public with "'03 Bonnie & Clyde" and the lines referencing Tupac Shakur in the song. He further acknowledges that if anyone attacks his girlfriend he would kill them: "Cross the line, speak about mine/ I'mma wave this TEC, I'm a geek about mine/ Touch a ni--a where his rib at/ I click clat/ Push your muh'fuckin' wig back."

== Critical reception ==
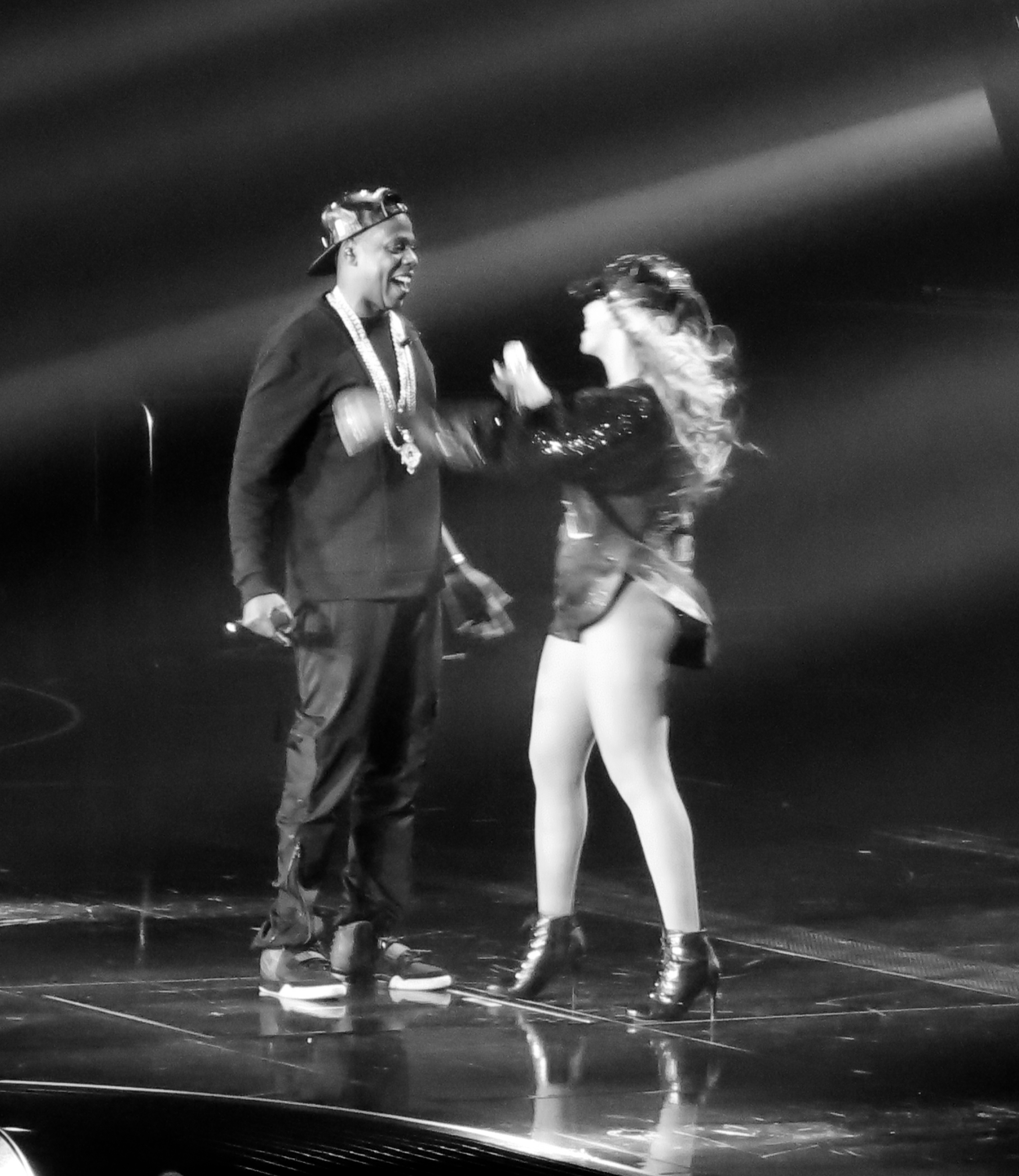
Jay-Z and Beyoncé performing.

Josh Grossberg of E! Online labelled the song as a "worthy and sultry sequel." Glenn Gamboa from Newsday wrote that "Part II (On the Run)" was one of the songs that created a new standard for R&B, showing how "strong grooves can coexist with strong lyrical concepts", noting that it contained a twist to the expected R&B love song. Critics praised the collaboration of Jay-Z and Beyoncé, with PopMatters Colin McGuire stating that "[it] prove[s] the value of teamwork in the hip-hop world," and DJ Booth's Nathan S. referencing the song as "as good as R&B-rap collaborations get." Nathan S. further concluded: "Whether it's making babies or making music, it seems like Jay and Beyoncé just can't miss when they're together." Many reviewers referenced the song as a continuation of the pair's "love story," praising the lyrical content for being "both endearing and dangerous," and "about their love and devotion to each other."

Jake Jenkins of AbsolutePunk wrote that "Beyoncé steals the show" and Insanul Ahmed and David Drake of Complex called it a "really great Beyoncé song." Further critique referenced the lyrical content, with Helen Brown of The Daily Telegraph writing that it was a "shame about the clichéd lyrics about, er, cliché," and Alex Macpherson from The Guardian stating "acknowledging your song is a cliché in the opening lines doesn't make it less of one." It was also questioned for its "lack of pop appeal," with Tom Quickfall from The Fly describing it as a "throwaway" song, Alex Macpherson's review for The Guardian disregarding it as an "aimless mid-tempo" and Kyle Ellison of The Quietus calling it "passionless." Mike Diver from Clash magazine described the song as "an incongruously positioned, piano-dominated R&B cut sandwiched between a pair of what are, essentially, interludes," going on to say: "It's like the track had no natural home, so the rapper constructed a standalone spot for it, isolated by design, so as not to disappoint the wife."

== Chart performance ==
For the week ending July 14, 2013, "Part II (On the Run)" charted at number 81 on the US Billboard Hot 100 chart. With the song appearing on the chart together with six other songs from Magna Carta... Holy Grail, Jay-Z was ranked at the fifth place for the most appearances in the Hot 100's archives. "Part II (On the Run)" also became the pair's fifth collaboration to reach the chart. As Beyoncé and Jay-Z married in 2008, the song marked their first Hot 100 hit as husband-and-wife. The same week it also appeared at number 29 on the US Hot R&B/Hip-Hop Songs chart.

It also debuted at number 93 on the UK Singles Chart and at number 187 on the French Singles Chart, following its release with Magna Carta Holy Grail.

== Music video ==
On April 17, 2014, Jay-Z and Beyoncé were seen filming the music video for "Part II (On the Run)" atop a motorcycle with Jay-Z in black leather biker gear and Beyoncé sporting a short white dress and veil.

The music video was later revealed to be a "faux-trailer" entitled "RUN", featuring "Part II (On the Run)" in the background. The video was released on May 17, 2014 to promote Beyoncé and Jay-Z's On the Run Tour. The video, which features multiple celebrity cameos including Don Cheadle, Guillermo Díaz, Jake Gyllenhaal, Blake Lively, Sean Penn, Emmy Rossum, Rashida Jones and Kidada Jones shows Beyoncé and Jay-Z out on a Bonnie and Clyde expedition, filled with action, crime, love and guns. Multiple other snippets of tracks from Magna Carta Holy Grail carry the video, alongside "Part II (On the Run)" The video was directed by Melina Matsoukas.

== Alternate version ==
On July 7, 2013 a solo version of "Part II (On the Run)" sang only by Beyoncé appeared on the Internet. Christina Lee of the website Idolator wrote in her review of the solo version: "'Without you, I got nothing to lose' Beyoncé sings in 'Part II (On the Run)'... In a strange way, she turned out to be right."

== Accolades ==
Year	Ceremony	Award	Result
2014	Grammy Awards (56th)	Best Rap/Sung Collaboration	Nominated

== Charts ==
=== Weekly charts ===
Chart (2013–2014)	Peak position
Belgium Urban (Ultratop Flanders)	49
France (SNEP)	187
UK Singles (Official Charts Company)	93
US Billboard Hot 100	77
US Rap Songs (Billboard)	9
US Hot R&B/Hip-Hop Songs (Billboard)	19
US Rhythmic Airplay (Billboard)	15

2026 chart performance for "Part II (On the Run)"
Chart (2026)	Peak position
Jamaica Airplay (JAMMS)	3

=== Year-end charts ===
Chart (2014)	Position
US Hot R&B/Hip-Hop Songs (Billboard)	63

== Certifications ==
Region	Certification	Certified units/sales
United States (RIAA)	Platinum	1,000,000^{‡}
^{‡} Sales+streaming figures based on certification alone.

== Release history ==
Country	Date	Format	Label	Label
United States	February 18, 2014	Contemporary hit radio	Roc-A-Fella; Roc Nation; Universal	
