= Magna Carta Holy Grail =

Studio album by Jay-Z
- Released: July 4, 2013
- Recorded: 2011 – June 2013
- Studios: Jungle City Studios (Chalybeate, New York); Oven Studios (New York City, New York)
- Genres: Hip-hop; East Coast hip-hop
- Length: 58:55
- Labels: Roc Nation; Roc-A-Fella; Island Def Jam; Universal; Third Man (vinyl)
- Producers: Boi-1da; Darhyl "Hey DJ" Camper; Hit-Boy; Jerome "Jroc" Harmon; Justin Timberlake; Kyambo "Hip Hop" Joshua; Marz; Mike Dean; Mike Will Made It; No I.D.; Pharrell Williams; Swizz Beatz; The-Dream; Timbaland; Travis Scott; Vinylz; WondaGurl

Jay-Z chronology
Live in Brooklyn (2012)	Magna Carta Holy Grail (2013)	4:44 (2017)

Singles from Magna Carta... Holy Grail
- 1. "Holy Grail" Released: July 10, 2013; 2. "Tom Ford" Released: September 26, 2013; 3. "Part II (On the Run)" Released: February 18, 2014

Magna Carta Holy Grail (alternatively written and stylized as Magna Carta... Holy Grail) is the twelfth studio album by American rapper Jay-Z. It was made available at first for free digital download for Samsung customers via the Jay-Z Magna Carta app on July 4, 2013. It was released for retail sale on July 8, 2013 by Roc Nation, Roc-A-Fella, Island Def Jam, and Universal Music Distribution, as well as the final release by Roc-A-Fella before the label was shuttered. The album features guest appearances by Justin Timberlake, Nas, Rick Ross, Frank Ocean and Beyoncé. Most of the album was produced by Timbaland and Jerome "J-Roc" Harmon, while other producers included Boi-1da, Mike Will Made It, Hit-Boy, Mike Dean, No I.D., The-Dream, Swizz Beatz, and Pharrell Williams among others. The album was promoted through various commercials presented by Samsung and was not preceded by any retail singles.

The album spawned three successful singles, "Holy Grail", "Tom Ford" and "Part II (On the Run)" featuring Beyoncé. Multiple other songs on the album achieved chart success including, "FuckWithMeYouKnowIGotIt", "Oceans", "Heaven" and "Picasso Baby". Additionally, the album was supported by three concert tours: Legends of the Summer (co-headlined with Justin Timberlake), Magna Carter World Tour and On the Run Tour (co-headlined with his wife Beyoncé).

Upon its release, Magna Carta... Holy Grail was met with mixed reviews from music critics. Some complimented the album's production and composition, while others were disappointed with its overall theme and found many songs repetitive. It debuted at number one on the US Billboard 200, selling 528,000 copies in its first week, making it Jay-Z's 13th consecutive studio album to top the chart. On September 2, 2013, it was announced that the album was certified double platinum by the RIAA, for shipments of two million copies. At the 56th Annual Grammy Awards, the album was nominated in six categories, winning the award for Best Rap/Sung Collaboration for "Holy Grail" featuring Justin Timberlake.

== Background ==
On September 23, 2010, rapper Q-Tip confirmed working on Jay-Z's twelfth studio album, with a tentative release in 2011. By May 2012, reports arose that he was working on new music with Roc Nation producer Jahlil Beats. In an interview with XXL, Beats stated: "Me and Jay-Z been going back and forth. He picked a couple of my joints that he's working on. I don't even wanna say too much about Jay, but we definitely working on some stuff. I haven't even sent him a bunch of beats. I sent him my favorite stuff. He hit me right back like, 'Yo, I'ma go in on this,' or, 'I like this.'" The album development was kept a secret, but The-Dream hinted about a new Jay-Z album in an April 2013 interview with Hot 97.

Leading up to the album's announcement, Jay-Z served as an executive producer for both the film The Great Gatsby and its soundtrack, The Great Gatsby: Music from Baz Luhrmann's Film, which he and film director Baz Luhrmann worked together for two years . The opening song, "100$ Bill" by Jay-Z contains a chopped and screwed beat, electro-rap elements and is written in the perspective of a modern-day Gatsby, it was both co-written and produced by E*vax one half of electronic rock duo Ratatat.

== Recording and production ==
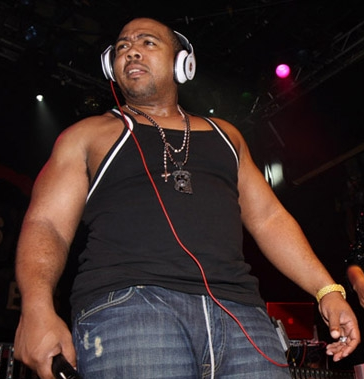
Timbaland provided the bulk of the production on the album.

In late 2011, it was confirmed three songs had been recorded and one of which featured Frank Ocean which would end up being "Oceans", the oldest song that appeared on the album. The recording for "Oceans" and production for "Holy Grail" were completed in 2011, during the recording sessions for Jay's collaborative album with Kanye West, Watch the Throne. West wanted the two songs to appear on Watch the Throne, however Jay-Z chose to keep them for Magna Carta Holy Grail. After Watch the Throne was released, Jay-Z chose to go on a worldwide concert tour instead of devoting more time for the album. Following the end of the tour, the main bulk of recording sessions for Magna Carta Holy Grail took place at Alicia Keys and Swizz Beatz' Jungle City Studios in New York, where Justin Timberlake and Beyoncé Knowles were also working on their albums at the time. Jay-Z described the recording process as having a "minimalist approach" to give Magna Carta Holy Grail a "1990s feel".

While working on Beyoncé's fifth studio album, frequent collaborator Timbaland played Jay-Z the instrumental for what would become "Picasso Baby". According to Jay-Z, that song built the sound of the album. Jay-Z and Timbaland had grown apart after they worked on The Blueprint 3, but reunited for this album. Timbaland ended up handling the majority of the production on Magna Carta Holy Grail. In an interview with BBC Radio 1, Jay-Z stated that while the two have recorded many songs in the past, it was not until Magna Carta Holy Grail that they got the chemistry to collaborate for a whole project. Producer J-Roc described "Picasso Baby" as "just New York". He told XXL that he and Timbaland "were really just feeling the city, the energy that it gives out" and were inspired by the "numerous different cultures and different dialects or sounds."

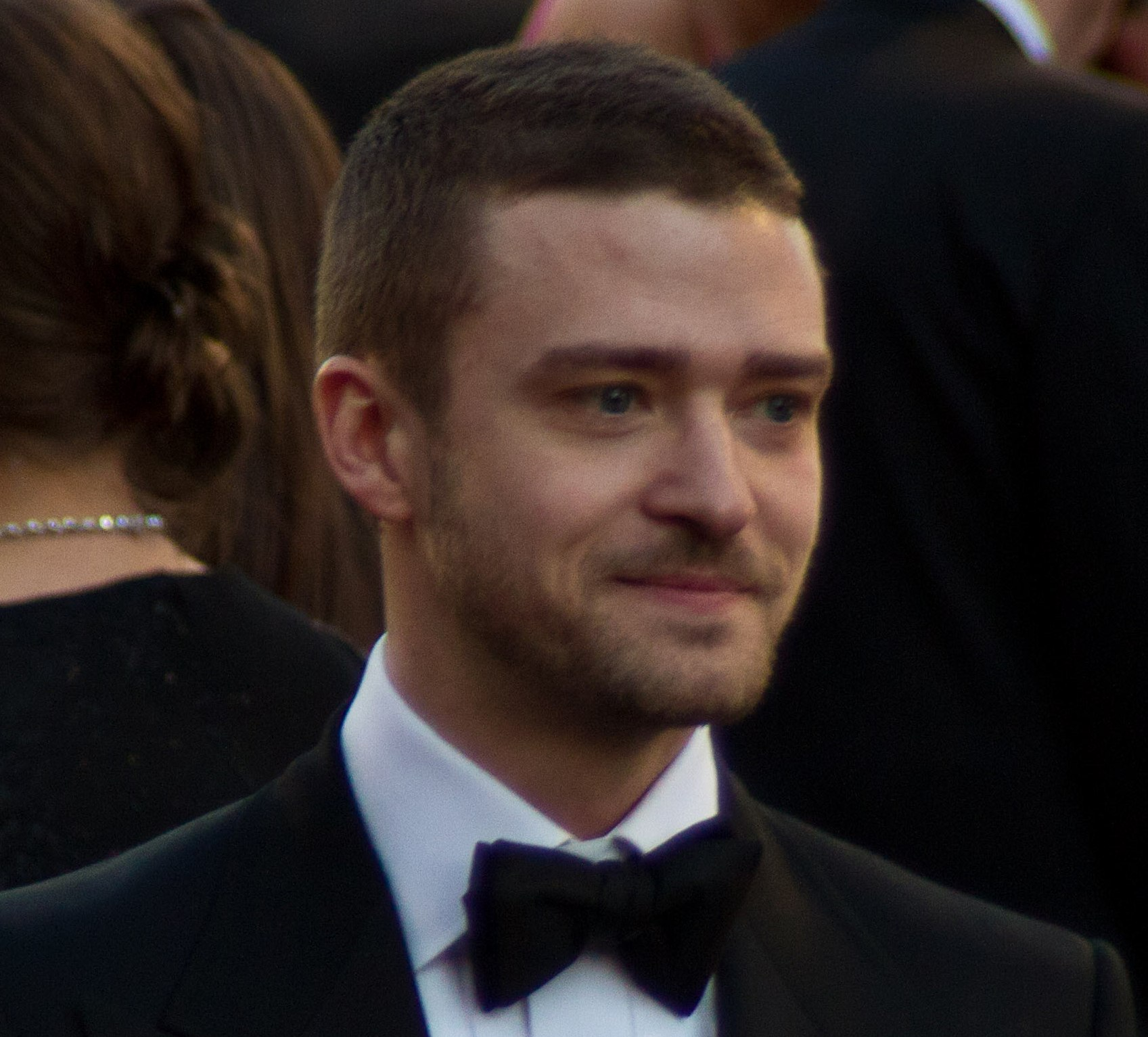
Justin Timberlake makes three appearances on the album.

The instrumental for "FuckWithMeYouKnowIGotIt" was started by producer Vinylz, who was inspired by a Pimp C speech he found on YouTube. He sampled Pimp C's voice for the intro and then created the instrumental in a short amount of time. After fellow producer Boi-1da added to the production, the song was sent to Rick Ross who intended to use it for his upcoming album. Jay-Z was meant to add a guest verse to it, but when he heard the instrumental, he wanted the track for his album. Timbaland added additional changes to it before they mastered the final version.

In 2012, Jay-Z contacted GOOD Music producer Hit-Boy about working together on Magna Carta Holy Grail. Hit-Boy created the instrumental for "Somewhereinamerica", a song that was initially supposed to appear on the debut album of Grand Hustle artist Travis Scott. While in the studio with Jay-Z, Scott played the instrumental for him and Jay-Z instantly liked it. The instrumental for the song "Crown" was made by 16-year-old Canadian producer WondaGurl. She had collaborated with Travis Scott on his Owl Pharaoh mixtape and went on to produce another track for his upcoming album. Scott liked the instrumental and started to build upon it with Mike Dean. The two then gave it to Jay-Z who recorded "Crown" over it.

Overall, Jay-Z worked extensively on the album's production with producers such as Swizz Beatz, Timbaland and Pharrell Williams who were also featured in the Samsung commercials promoting Magna Carta Holy Grail. He had also worked on the album's production with Jahlil Beats, Boi-1da, Mike Dean, Kanye West and Mike Will Made It, among others. He had also been seen in the studio with various recording artists such as Drake, The-Dream, Raekwon, Nas, and Timberlake working on the album. Mike Dean told Sowmya Krishnamurthy at MTV Hive that a preliminary leaked tracklist was only partially correct. The final track listing revealed guest appearances by Timberlake, Frank Ocean, Nas, Pharrell, Swizz Beatz, Rick Ross and Beyoncé among others.

== Release and promotion ==
On June 16, 2013, during the fifth game of the 2013 NBA Finals, Jay-Z was featured in a new commercial by Samsung where he announced that his twelfth studio album would be titled, Magna Carta Holy Grail and would be released on July 4, 2013. He was seen speaking to producer Rick Rubin in the studio about the album saying, "[It] is about, like this duality of how do you navigate through this whole thing, through success, through failures, through all this and remain yourself." The commercial featured producers that are confirmed to be on the album including Timbaland, Swizz Beatz and Pharrell Williams. The album was made available for free download on July 4, 12:01 a.m. EST, to the first one million Samsung Galaxy S III, Samsung Galaxy S4 and Samsung Galaxy Note II users of a new app. Shortly after, Billboard said that the Samsung deal would not count towards the sales figures used by Nielsen SoundScan to compile their charts. The album was then released for retail sale three days later, on July 7, 2013.

Leading up to the release of the album, Jay-Z released selected lyrics of each song daily, via the Samsung app. This included "Holy Grail", "Heaven", "Oceans", "Part II (On the Run)", "BBC", "Jay Z Blue", "Versus", "La Familia", "Tom Ford", "Beach Is Better", "Crown", "Picasso Baby", "F.U.T.W.", "Nickels & Dimes" and "SomewhereInAmerica" in order. On July 3, 2013, the cover art of the album was revealed in a photo where it was placed next to one of the four surviving copies of the album's namesake (the 13th-century English charter) in Salisbury Cathedral, England, and it remained on display there until the end of July. The logo for the album was inspired by an art piece by Be Andr from 2009 named 'Untitled (art)'.

During the 2013 Grammy Awards, Timberlake and Jay-Z performed their hit single "Suit & Tie". Following their appearance on Grammys, rumors of a stadium tour between the artists were raised as a result of Jay-Z's posts on his Life + Times website; he posted series of venues with the note "#LegendsOfSummer this week". The Legends of the Summer Stadium Tour was officially announced on February 22, 2013. The tour begun on July 14, 2013 in London, England. Starting in October 2013, Jay-Z toured Europe on the Magna Carter World Tour. It began on October 3 at the Manchester Arena in Manchester, England and concluded on October 29 at the Ziggo Dome in Amsterdam, Netherlands. The North American leg followed that, and it ended on January 31, 2014.

== Singles ==
On April 11, 2013, Jay-Z released the first song from the album titled "Open Letter". The song was a response to the critics of his fifth wedding anniversary that took place in Cuba. This was due to the current United States embargo against Cuba, which required them needing a permit to visit the country. The song was produced by Swizz Beatz, and was included on the album as a bonus track. On July 10, 2013, Jack White's label, Third Man Records, announced on their website that they had entered a deal to release Magna Carta Holy Grail on vinyl, also confirming that "Open Letter" would be included as a vinyl-only bonus track and that there would be "something [else] very special planned for the vinyl edition." The 'vinyl-only' appearance of "Open Letter" was thought to have been shown to not apply to all market areas, but it was later discovered upon the vinyl's re-release in early 2015 that "Open Letter" was hidden as an easter egg within the back flap of the packaging, which would require the buyer to cut open the back end of it to retrieve the single in the form of a flexi disc, constructed like a "playable card". Third Man was originally set to issue "Open Letter" in the form of a vinyl single designed as a playable letter. In an interview with Hot 97, Jay-Z went into detail about the single's release, saying: "It's in a letter. You can play the letter. It's amazing... You open the letter, and you can actually play the card."

The song "Holy Grail" features vocals from singer Justin Timberlake and served as the album's first single. It was produced by The-Dream, Timbaland and Jerome "J-Roc" Harmon, with additional production from No I.D. and containing elements of Nirvana's 1991 hit single "Smells Like Teen Spirit". Following the release of the album, the song debuted at number eight on the US Billboard Hot 100 and number 24 on the UK Singles Chart. The song has since peaked at number four on the Billboard Hot 100. The music video, directed by Anthony Mandler, was released on August 29, 2013, making social media history as the first time a clip from major artists debuted strictly on Facebook.

On September 26, 2013, the album's second single "Tom Ford" was serviced to urban contemporary radio in the United Kingdom and then on October 15, 2013, to rhythmic contemporary in the United States. Prior to its single release, the song peaked at number 39 on the US Billboard Hot 100. "Part II (On the Run)" featuring Beyoncé was serviced to contemporary hit radio stations on February 18, 2014 as the album's third single. The song has since peaked at number 80 on the Billboard Hot 100.

== Critical reception ==
Professional ratings
Aggregate scores
Source	Rating
AnyDecentMusic?	5.4/10
Metacritic	60/100
Review scores
Source	Rating
AllMusic	3/5 stars
The A.V. Club	C−
The Daily Telegraph	3/5 stars
Los Angeles Times	3/4 stars
MSN Music (Expert Witness)	B+
NME	6/10
Pitchfork	5.8/10
Rolling Stone	3/5 stars
Spin	5/10
The Times	3/5 stars

According to the review aggregator Metacritic, Magna Carta Holy Grail received "mixed or average reviews" based on a weighted average score of 60 out of 100 from 42 critic scores. In The New York Times, Jon Pareles wrote that Jay-Z was trying to transition from his pop sensibilities but had not yet found a "reliable alternative" on Magna Carta Holy Grail, where his raps were often mismatched with rigidly produced tracks. AllMusic's Andy Kellman believed the record was hastily produced and despite occasionally impressive lyrics, Jay-Z's pop culture references sounded reflexive. Spin magazine's Jordan Sargent said the songs sounded at once overly elaborate and unfinished, along with similar but less momentous themes in comparison to Watch the Throne. Jesse Cataldo from Slant Magazine deemed it a self-important album marred by shallow name-dropping, while accusing Jay-Z of becoming disinterested creatively because of his increased success. Evan Rytlewski of The A.V. Club felt the rapper had exhausted the end of his rags to riches narrative and was unable to reinvent himself beyond gloating superficially about his riches. The Daily Telegraph's Helen Brown found his boastful references heavy-handed and the album unchallenging, albeit enjoyable for "the lazy listener". Greg Kot wrote in the Chicago Tribune viewed that, apart from well-written moments on "Oceans", Jay-Z Blue", and "Nickel & Dimes", most of the album was inconsequential.

In a generally positive review, Randall Roberts from the Los Angeles Times was impressed by the production's energy and samples, even though he thought the album was not as intellectual or adventurous as its title suggests. Uncut wrote that it mostly succeeded as an attempt by Jay-Z to "balance his great wealth, tough history and news responsibility while retaining his grit." NME critic Louis Pattison said it lacked a radical presence such as Kanye West to complement Jay-Z's mature ruminations, but nonetheless showed him as a sagacious lyricist comparable with Bruce Springsteen or Bob Dylan. In The Observer, Kitty Empire believed that while the diverse production would appeal to listeners at first rather than Jay-Z's predictably "umpteenth retelling" of his rags-to-riches story, the topics become more interesting on subsequent listens because of his surprisingly concerned takes on fatherhood and charity. Robert Christgau from MSN Music said he was won over after several listens by the familial songs, which he found amusing on a record that pits "black man as artistic rebel versus black man as family stalwart".

=== Accolades ===
Magna Carta Holy Grail was met with many accolades and was named in multiple "Albums of the Year" lists by major publications. Complex ranked the album at number 23, on their list of the 50 best albums of 2013. They praised the "high-gloss production," and strong rhymes by Jay-Z, deeming it "very listenable". Rolling Stone named it the tenth best hip-hop album of the 2013 saying, "The legendary MC explored of-the-moment sounds, textures and tempos in ways only he could [...] Even on a bit of an off day, Jay is still plenty impressive." It was named the eighth best album of 2013 by XXL. The album was also nominated for a few awards. It was nominated for Album of the Year at the 2013 BET Hip Hop Awards. At the 56th Annual Grammy Awards in 2014, the album received a nomination for Best Rap Album.

Year	Ceremony	Category	Result
2013	BET Hip Hop Awards	Album of the Year	Nominated
2014	Billboard Music Awards	Top Rap Album	Nominated
2014	56th Annual Grammy Awards	Best Rap Album	Nominated

== Commercial performance ==
Magna Carta Holy Grail was certified platinum by the Recording Industry Association of America (RIAA) on the day of its release due to a deal with Jay-Z and Samsung, where they agreed to purchase one million copies of the album to offer to their users for free. The album ultimately debuted at number one on the US Billboard 200 chart, selling 528,000 copies in its first week. This became Jay-Z's 13th consecutive number one album in the US. It also bypassed its predicted debut in the range of 350,000 to 400,000. In its second week, the album remained at number one on the chart, selling an additional 129,000 copies. It also became the first rap album to spend two consecutive weeks on top since Lil Wayne's Tha Carter IV (2011), despite the 76% drop in sales. In its third week, the album dropped to number two on the chart, selling 77,000 more copies. In its fourth week, the album dropped to number three on the chart, selling 62,000 copies. On September 5, 2013, the album was certified double platinum by the RIAA for shipments of over two million copies. By the end of 2013, the album sold 1,099,000 copies in the United States, making it the tenth best-selling album of the year. In 2013, Magna Carta Holy Grail was ranked as the 12th most popular album of the year on the Billboard 200. As of February 2014, the album had sold 1,130,000 copies in the United States.

== Track listing ==
On June 22, Jay-Z held a viral scavenger hunt around Brooklyn, New York as part of his "#NEWRULES" venture with Samsung. The 100 winners of the hunt were given a binder that revealed the track list.

Magna Carta Holy Grail track listing
No.	Title	Writer(s)	Producer(s)	Length
1.	"Holy Grail" (featuring Justin Timberlake)	Shawn Carter; Terius Nash; Justin Timberlake; Timothy Mosley; Jerome Harmon; Ernest Wilson; Kurt Cobain; David Grohl; Krist Novoselic	The-Dream; Timbaland; J-Roc; No I.D.^{[b]}	5:38
2.	"Picasso Baby"	Carter; Mosley; Harmon; Adrian Younge	Timbaland; J-Roc	4:05
3.	"Tom Ford"	Carter; Mosley; Harmon	Timbaland; J-Roc	3:09
4.	"Fuckwithmeyouknowigotit" (featuring Rick Ross)	Carter; Matthew Samuels; Anderson Hernandez; William Roberts II	Boi-1da; Vinylz; Timbaland^{[b]}; J-Roc^{[b]}	4:03
5.	"Oceans" (featuring Frank Ocean)	Carter; Christopher Breaux; Pharrell Williams	Pharrell; Timbaland^{[b]}	3:58
6.	"F.U.T.W."	Carter; Mosley; Harmon	Timbaland; J-Roc	4:02
7.	"Somewhereinamerica"	Carter; Chauncey Hollis, Jr.; Darhyl "Hey DJ" Camper, Jr.; Michael Dean	Hit-Boy; Hey DJ Camper; Mike Dean	2:28
8.	"Crown"	Carter; Ebony Oshunrinde; Jacques Webster; M. Dean; Kirk Bennett; Miguel Collins; Bobby Dixon	WondaGurl; Travis Scott; M. Dean	4:33
9.	"Heaven"	Carter; Nash; Timberlake; Mosley; Harmon; William Berry; Peter Buck; Michael Mills; John Stipe; Younge	Timbaland; J-Roc	4:03
10.	"Versus"	Carter; Mosley; Kasseem Dean; Harmon; Jonathan Davis; Frederick Hubbard; Muhammad Jones; Malik Taylor	Timbaland; Swizz Beatz	0:51
11.	"Part II (On the Run)" (featuring Beyoncé)	Carter; James Fauntleroy II; Mosley; Harmon	Timbaland; J-Roc	5:33
12.	"Beach Is Better"	Carter; Michael Williams II; Marquel Middlebrooks	Mike Will Made It; Marz^{[a]}	0:55
13.	"BBC"	Carter; P. Williams; Nasir Jones; Mosley; Timberlake; K. Dean	Pharrell	3:12
14.	"JAY Z Blue"	Carter; Mosley; Harmon; Timberlake; Carlos Broady; Sean Combs; Darryl McDaniels; Nashiem Myrick; Christopher Wallace	Timbaland; J-Roc; Timberlake^{[b]}	3:50
15.	"La Familia"	Carter; Mosley; Harmon	Timbaland; J-Roc	3:33
16.	"Nickels and Dimes"	Carter; Kyambo "Hip Hop" Joshua; M. Dean; Sumach Valentine	Hip Hop; M. Dean^{[b]}	5:03
Total length:				58:55

Vinyl and flexi-disc card bonus track
No.	Title	Writer(s)	Producer(s)	Length
17.	"Open Letter"	Carter; K. Dean; Mosley; Harmon	Swizz Beatz; Timbaland^{[b]}; J-Roc^{[b]}	2:40
Total length:				61:35

=== Notes ===
- ^{^[a]} signifies a co-producer.
- ^{^[b]} signifies an additional producer.
- "Holy Grail" has additional vocals by Terius "The-Dream" Nash.
- "Picasso Baby" has additional vocals by The-Dream and Zofia Borucka Moreno.
- "Tom Ford" has additional vocals by Third Ward Trill.
- "Crown" has additional vocals by Travis Scott.
- "Heaven" has additional vocals by Justin Timberlake.
- "BBC" has additional vocals by Nas, Beyoncé, Timbaland, Pharrell, Justin Timberlake and Swizz Beatz.
- "JAY Z Blue" has additional vocals by Taffy.
- "Open Letter" has additional vocals by Swizz Beatz and Trey Songz.

=== Samples credits ===
- "Holy Grail" contains elements of "Smells Like Teen Spirit" performed by Nirvana.
- "Picasso Baby" contains a sample of "Sirens" performed by Adrian Younge.
- "Tom Ford" contains elements of "Bad Girls" performed by M.I.A.
- "Somewhereinamerica" embodies portions of "Gangster of Love (Part 1)" written by Johnny Guitar Watson.
- "Crown" contains a sample of "Solid as a Rock" performed by Sizzla.
- "Heaven" contains a sample of "Reverie" performed by Adrian Younge, and lyrically samples "Losing My Religion" performed by R.E.M.
- "Versus" embodies portions of A Tribe Called Quest's "Sucka Nigga", and contains a sample of "Lilith – On The Way" performed by Bruno Spoerri.
- "Part II (On the Run)" contains a sample of "Believe in Me" performed by One Way.
- "Jay Z Blue" contains samples from "My Downfall" performed by The Notorious B.I.G. and a monologue by Faye Dunaway in the 1981 film Mommie Dearest.
- "Nickels and Dimes" contains a sample of "Nikels and Dimes" performed by Gonjasufi.

== Personnel ==
Credits are adapted from AllMusic.

- Beyoncé – featured artist, vocals
- Boi-1da – producer
- Darhyl "DJ" Camper Jr. – producer
- Shawn "Jay-Z" Carter – executive producer, primary artist
- Mike Dean – additional production, mixing, producer
- Demacio "Demo" Castellon – engineer, mixing
- The-Dream – producer, vocals
- Chris Gehringer – mastering
- Chris Godbey – engineer
- Jerome "J-Roc" Harmon – additional production, producer
- Hit-Boy – producer
- Ken "Duro" Ifill – mixing
- Jaycen Joshua – mixing
- Kyambo "Hip Hop" Joshua – producer
- Ryan Kaul – mixing assistant
- Jonathan Lee – assistant engineer
- Ari Marcopoulos – photography
- Marz – producer
- Zeke Mishanec – assistant engineer
- Zofia Borucka Moreno – vocals
- Nas – vocals
- No ID – additional production
- Frank Ocean – featured artist
- Ebony "WondaGurl" Oshunrinde – additional production
- Willo Perron – creative director
- Ramon Rivas – assistant engineer, engineer
- Brian Roettinger – art direction
- Rick Ross – featured artist
- Travis Scott – producer, vocals
- Swizz Beatz – producer, vocals
- Taffy – vocals
- Timbaland – additional production, producer, vocals
- Justin Timberlake – additional production, featured artist, vocals
- Vinylz – producer
- Matt Weber – assistant engineer
- Eric Weissman – sample clearance
- Mike Will – producer
- Pharrell Williams – producer, vocals
- Jordan "DJ Swivel" Young – editing, engineer

== Charts ==
=== Weekly charts ===
Chart (2013)	Peak position
Australian Albums (ARIA)	2
Austrian Albums (Ö3 Austria)	14
Belgian Albums (Ultratop Flanders)	7
Belgian Albums (Ultratop Wallonia)	31
Canadian Albums (Billboard)	1
Danish Albums (Hitlisten)	2
Dutch Albums (Album Top 100)	7
Finnish Albums (Suomen virallinen lista)	17
French Albums (SNEP)	12
German Albums (Offizielle Top 100)	9
Irish Albums (IRMA)	2
Italian Albums (FIMI)	23
Japanese Albums (Oricon)	46
South Korean Albums (Circle)	19
New Zealand Albums (RMNZ)	2
Norwegian Albums (VG-lista)	2
Polish Albums (ZPAV)	28
Scottish Albums (Official Charts)	1
South African Albums (RISA)	18
Swiss Albums (Schweizer Hitparade)	1
Swedish Albums (Sverigetopplistan)	8
Spanish Albums (Promusicae)	59
UK Albums (OCC)	1
UK R&B Albums (Official Charts)	1
US Billboard 200	1
US Top R&B/Hip-Hop Albums (Billboard)	1
US Indie Store Album Sales (Billboard)	1

=== Year-end charts ===
Chart (2013)	Position
Australian Urban Albums Chart	13
Belgian Albums Chart (Wallonia)	85
Belgian Albums Chart (Flanders)	175
Canadian Albums Chart	24
Swedish Albums Chart	90
Swiss Albums Chart	67
UK Albums Chart	70
US Billboard 200	12
US Top R&B/Hip-Hop Albums (Billboard)	4

=== Decade-end charts ===
Chart (2010–2019)	Position
US Billboard 200	121

== Certifications ==
Region	Certification	Certified units/sales
Canada (Music Canada)	Platinum	80,000^{^}
Denmark (IFPI Danmark)	Gold	10,000^{‡}
United Kingdom (BPI)	Gold	100,000^{*}
United States (RIAA)	3× Platinum	3,000,000^{‡}
^{*} Sales figures based on certification alone.^{^} Shipments figures based on certification alone.^{‡} Sales+streaming figures based on certification alone.

== Release history ==
Region	Date	Format	Label	Edition
Worldwide	July 4, 2013	Digital download (via JAY Z Magna Carta Samsung app)	Roc Nation; Roc-A-Fella; Universal	Standard
Australia	July 8, 2013	Digital download	Roc Nation; Roc-A-Fella; Universal	Standard
Australia	July 8, 2013	CD	Roc Nation; Roc-A-Fella; Universal	Bonus track
Germany	July 8, 2013	Digital download; CD	Roc Nation; Roc-A-Fella; Universal	Standard
United Kingdom	July 8, 2013	Digital download	Virgin EMI	Standard
Canada	July 9, 2013	Digital download; CD	Roc Nation; Roc-A-Fella; Universal	Standard
United States	July 9, 2013	Digital download; CD	Roc Nation; Roc-A-Fella; Universal	Standard
United Kingdom	July 22, 2013	CD	Roc Nation; Roc-A-Fella; Virgin EMI	Standard
Canada	July 23, 2013	CD	Roc Nation; Roc-A-Fella; Universal	Standard
United States	March 20, 2015	Vinyl	Third Man	Bonus track
