= Oceans (Jay-Z song) =

Song by Jay-Z featuring Frank Ocean

from the album Magna Carta Holy Grail
- Released: July 4, 2013
- Recorded: 2011
- Genre: Hip hop
- Length: 3:58
- Label: Roc-A-Fella; Roc Nation; Universal
- Songwriter(s): Shawn Corey Carter; Christopher Breaux; Timothy Zachery Mosley; Pharrell Williams
- Producer(s): Pharrell Williams; Timbaland (add.)

"Oceans" is a song by American rapper Jay-Z recorded for his twelfth studio album Magna Carta Holy Grail. The song features American singer Frank Ocean and was produced by Pharrell Williams, with additional production from Timbaland. The song has peaked at number 83 on the U.S. Billboard Hot 100.

== Recording and composition ==
"Oceans", along with another song from Magna Carta Holy Grail titled "Holy Grail" were recorded in 2011 during the recording sessions for Jay-Z's collaborative album with Kanye West, Watch the Throne. West wanted the two songs to appear on Watch the Throne, but Jay-Z chose to keep them for his upcoming twelfth studio album and they were replaced with "No Church in the Wild" and "Made in America".

== Chart performance ==
Chart (2013)	Peak position
US Billboard Hot 100	83
US Hot R&B/Hip-Hop Songs (Billboard)	30

== Certifications ==
Region	Certification	Certified units/sales
United States (RIAA)	Gold	500,000^{‡}
^{‡} Sales+streaming figures based on certification alone.
