= Holy Grail (Jay-Z song) =

2013 single by Jay-Z featuring Justin Timberlake

Single by Jay-Z featuring Justin Timberlake

from the album Magna Carta Holy Grail
- Released: July 4, 2013
- Recorded: 2011
- Studio: Jungle City Studios (Chalybeate, New York); Oven Studios (New York City, New York)
- Genre: Hip-hop; R&B; pop
- Length: 5:38 (album version); 4:00 (radio edit)
- Label: Roc-A-Fella; Roc Nation; Universal
- Songwriters: Shawn Carter; Justin Timberlake; Terius Nash; Timothy Mosley; Jerome Harmon; Ernest Wilson; Kurt Cobain; Dave Grohl; Krist Novoselic
- Producers: The-Dream; Timbaland; J-Roc; No I.D.

Jay-Z singles chronology
"Bitch, Don't Kill My Vibe" (2013)	"Holy Grail" (2013)	"Higher" (2013)

Justin Timberlake singles chronology
"Tunnel Vision" (2013)	"Holy Grail" (2013)	"Take Back the Night" (2013)

Music video
- "Holy Grail" on YouTube

"Holy Grail" is a song by American rapper Jay-Z from his twelfth studio album Magna Carta Holy Grail. It features vocals from American singer Justin Timberlake and serves as the album's lead single. It was produced by The-Dream, Timbaland, and J-Roc, with additional production from No I.D. and contains elements of Nirvana's 1991 single "Smells Like Teen Spirit". Lyrically, "Holy Grail" finds both performers discussing the hardships of fame.

Following the release of the album, the song debuted at number eight on the Billboard Hot 100, where it peaked at number four the following week. In other regions, it peaked at number seven on the UK Singles Chart. "Holy Grail" had sold over 3.4 million copies in the United States as of 2018. It won Best Rap/Sung Collaboration at the 56th Annual Grammy Awards. In 2014, Billboard placed it at number 25 on their list of Top 100 Hot Rap Songs of all time.

== Recording and composition ==
"Holy Grail", along with another track from Magna Carta Holy Grail called "Oceans", was recorded in 2011 during the recording sessions for Jay-Z's collaborative album with Kanye West, Watch the Throne. West wanted the two songs to appear on Watch the Throne, but Jay-Z chose to keep them for his upcoming studio album and they were replaced with "No Church in the Wild" and "Made in America". The early version of the instrumental was created in 2011 by The-Dream. When the recording sessions for MCHG started, Timbaland, together with fellow producer J-Roc, rearranged the instrumental to create the final track.

"Holy Grail" is composed in a D minor key, and is in common time at a tempo of 72 beats per minute. The vocals range from the note of G_{3} to C_{6}. Jay-Z lyrically sampled rock group Nirvana's single "Smells Like Teen Spirit" after receiving permission from Courtney Love, who owns the rights to the original song. In an interview with BBC Radio 1, Jay-Z stated that "Holy Grail" was "the map for the album" and that it set the tone for the rest of MCHG. When the song was first recorded for Watch the Throne, Jay-Z thought it would get lost on the album and decided to keep it as the "center piece" for his next album. The song's lyrics can be interpreted as Jay-Z's and Timberlake's love-hate relationship with fame.

== Music video ==
On August 2, 2013, Jay-Z revealed to Power 106 that he and fellow tour mate Justin Timberlake had begun shooting the music video for "Holy Grail". The music video was directed by Anthony Mandler and was released on August 29, 2013, on Facebook, making social media history as the first time a clip from major artists debuted exclusively on the site. Dubbed a "visual" rather than a "music video", the piece is a remixed version of the original album version, featuring pitch shifted vocals and a change in the song structure.

The visual was critically acclaimed for both its imagery and remixed vocals. It was photographed by cinematographer David Devlin. Kyle Anderson from Entertainment Weekly praised the piece's imagery, describing its nightmarish sequences as "arresting", and complimented the remixed video version of the song as "miles beyond the album version".

== Reception ==
Andy Gill of The Independent described the song as "smooth and mellifluous," while Rolling Stone's Simon Vozick called it a "surprisingly moody opener." DJ Booth praised the track as an "appropriately bombastic intro to an epic LP." In Billboard, Adelle Platon noted the song "features Timberlake's vocals in raw, heart-wrenching form as he sings of the pitfalls of fame." Criticizing the song as "laughably overblown", Ian Cohen of Pitchfork Media writes that Timberlake "cycles through every tortured artist cliché short of a crucifixion metaphor." Cohen further stated that the "Smells Like Teen Spirit" interpolation "becomes just another forgettable status symbol" and commented: "Where Kurt Cobain felt compromised by his fame, Jay and Timberlake are doing everything in their power not to offend the money people—whether it's Samsung, Target, or someone dropping $250 to see them at the Rose Bowl."

"Holy Grail" had a hot-shot debut on many charts upon the release of the album, despite not being released as an official single. It debuted at number eight on the US Billboard Hot 100, being at the time the second-highest debut of the year 2013 on that chart. It peaked at number four and remained in the top 10 for 16 weeks. It has sold over 3.4 million copies in the US as of 2018. After entering at number 24, "Holy Grail" peaked at number seven on the UK Singles Chart. In 2013, "Holy Grail" was ranked as the 22nd most popular song of the year on the Billboard Hot 100.

== Live performances ==
Justin Timberlake and Jay-Z performed "Holy Grail" together during their co-headlining tour Legends of the Summer. They also performed the song live at the Wireless Festival in London on July 14, 2013. During the concert at Barclays Center as part of Timberlake's The 20/20 Experience World Tour on December 14, 2014, Jay-Z joined him on stage to perform the song.

"Holy Grail" was also performed during the On the Run Tour (2014) and as the opening number on On the Run II Tour (2018), a co-headlining tour by Beyoncé and Jay-Z. During the performance of the song, Beyoncé sang Justin Timberlake's parts. Consequence's Alex Young chose the song as one of the particular highlights of the show.

== Awards ==
Year	Ceremony	Award	Result	Ref.
2013	Soul Train Music Awards	Best Hip Hop Song of the Year	Nominated	
2014	Billboard Music Awards	Top Rap Song	Nominated	
2014	Grammy Awards (56th)	Best Rap/Sung Collaboration	Won	
2014	Grammy Awards (56th)	Best Rap Song	Nominated	
2014	iHeartRadio Music Awards	Best Collaboration	Nominated	
2014	iHeartRadio Music Awards	Hip Hop/R&B Song of the Year	Nominated	
2014	BET Awards	Best Collaboration	Nominated	
2014	BET Hip Hop Awards	Best Collabo, Duo or Group	Nominated	
2014	ASCAP Pop Music Awards	Most Performed Songs	Won	
2014	ASCAP Rhythm & Soul Awards	Award Winning R&B/Hip-Hop Songs	Won	
2014	ASCAP Rhythm & Soul Awards	Top Rap Song	Won	
2014	BMI R&B/Hip-Hop Awards	Most Performed Songs	Won	

== Personnel ==
Credits are adapted from Tidal.

- Shawn Carter – vocals, writing
- Justin Timberlake – vocals, writing
- Terius Nash – writing, production
- Timothy Mosley – writing, production
- Jerome Harmon – writing, production
- Ernest Wilson – writing, additional production
- Kurt Cobain – writing
- Dave Grohl – writing
- Krist Novoselic – writing

== Charts ==
=== Weekly charts ===
Chart (2013)	Peak position
Australia (ARIA)	42
Belgium (Ultratop 50 Flanders)	26
Belgium (Ultratop 50 Wallonia)	28
Canada Hot 100 (Billboard)	13
Denmark (Tracklisten)	11
Euro Digital Song Sales (Billboard)	10
France (SNEP)	40
Germany (GfK)	24
Ireland (IRMA)	53
Italian Airplay (EarOne)	123
Lebanon (The Official Lebanese Top 20)	6
Netherlands (Single Top 100)	83
New Zealand (Recorded Music NZ)	18
Norway (VG-lista)	11
Scottish Singles Sales (Official Charts)	10
Slovakia Airplay (ČNS IFPI)	68
South Korean International Singles (GAON)	1
Sweden (Sverigetopplistan)	15
Switzerland (Schweizer Hitparade)	24
UK Singles (Official Charts)	7
UK Airplay (Music Week)	15
UK Hip Hop/R&B (Official Charts)	1
US Billboard Hot 100	4
US Hot R&B/Hip-Hop Songs (Billboard)	2
US Pop Airplay (Billboard)	5
US Rhythmic Airplay (Billboard)	1

=== Year-end charts ===
Chart (2013)	Position
Australia Urban (ARIA)	48
Belgium (Ultratop 50 Flanders)	98
Belgium Urban (Ultratop Flanders)	24
Canada (Canadian Hot 100)	51
Denmark Streaming (Tracklisten)	43
Sweden (Sverigetopplistan)	70
UK Singles (Official Charts Company)	60
US Billboard Hot 100	22
US Mainstream Top 40 (Billboard)	34
US Hot R&B/Hip-Hop Songs (Billboard)	5
US Rhythmic (Billboard)	5
Chart (2014)	Position
US Hot R&B/Hip-Hop Songs (Billboard)	58

== Certifications ==
Region	Certification	Certified units/sales
Canada (Music Canada)	Platinum	80,000^{*}
Denmark (IFPI Danmark)	Gold	15,000^{^}
Denmark (IFPI Danmark) Streaming	Platinum	1,800,000^{†}
Germany (BVMI)	Gold	150,000^{‡}
New Zealand (RMNZ)	Platinum	15,000^{*}
South Korea	—	90,005
Sweden (GLF)	2× Platinum	80,000^{‡}
United Kingdom (BPI)	Platinum	600,000^{‡}
United States (RIAA)	6× Platinum	6,000,000^{‡}
^{*} Sales figures based on certification alone.^{^} Shipments figures based on certification alone.^{‡} Sales+streaming figures based on certification alone.^{†} Streaming-only figures based on certification alone.

== Release history ==
Region	Date	Format	Label	Ref.
United Kingdom	July 15, 2013	Urban contemporary radio	Roc Nation	
