= Universal Music Distribution =

Record label distributor

- Formerly: Decca Distributing Corporation (1934–1970); MCA Distributing Corp. (1970–1990); Uni Distribution Corporation (1990–1996); Universal Music & Video Distribution (1996–2006)
- Company type: Distributor
- Founded: 1934
- Defunct: 2015
- Fate: Dismantled
- Headquarters: Los Angeles, California, U.S.
- Parent: Universal Music Group

Universal Music Distribution was the primary music distribution unit of parent company Universal Music Group until 2015 when the company was dismantled.

It oversaw the sales, marketing and distribution activities for UMG labels Republic Records, Island Records, Def Jam Recordings, Capitol Music Group, Interscope Geffen A&M Records, UMG Nashville, Verve Music Group, Decca Label Group, Universal Music Latin Entertainment, Universal Music Enterprises, and Varèse Sarabande.

It also provided North American distribution to non-Universal-owned labels such as Roc Nation, Big Machine Records, ABKCO Records, Concord Records, Darksyde Productions Inc and Rounder Records and handled worldwide distribution for Disney Music Group's two labels: Walt Disney Records and Hollywood Records.

It also managed distribution and sales for Vivendi Entertainment, the company's home entertainment division, until it was sold to Gaiam in 2012. Before that, from 1987 to 1992, it managed distribution for LIVE Entertainment.

== History ==
=== Dismantling ===
In April 2015, Universal Music Distribution was dismantled to "create even stronger ties between our centralized teams and labels" according to parent company Universal Music Group.
