= List of Netflix original films (2018) =

Netflix is an American global on-demand Internet streaming media provider, that has distributed a number of original programs, including original series, specials, miniseries, documentaries and films. Netflix's original films also include content that was first screened on cinematic release in other countries or given exclusive broadcast in other territories, and is then described as Netflix original content.

== Feature films ==
| Title | Release date | Genre | Runtime | Language |
|---|---|---|---|---|
| The Polka King | January 12, 2018 | Biographical comedy | 1 h 34 min | English |
| Step Sisters | January 19, 2018 | Comedy | 1 h 48 min | English |
| The Open House | January 19, 2018 | Horror thriller | 1 h 34 min | English |
| A Futile and Stupid Gesture | January 26, 2018 | Biographical comedy | 1 h 41 min | English |
| The Cloverfield Paradox | February 4, 2018 | Science fiction horror | 1 h 42 min | English |
| When We First Met | February 9, 2018 | Romantic comedy | 1 h 37 min | English |
| Love per Square Foot | February 14, 2018 | Romantic comedy | 2 h 13 min | Hindi |
| Irreplaceable You | February 16, 2018 | Romantic drama | 1 h 36 min | English |
| Mute | February 23, 2018 | Science fiction | 2 h 6 min | English |
| The Outsider | March 9, 2018 | Crime drama | 2 h | English |
| Benji | March 16, 2018 | Family | 1 h 27 min | English |
| Game Over, Man! | March 23, 2018 | Action comedy | 1 h 41 min | English |
| Paradox | March 23, 2018 | Musical / Western / Fantasy | 1 h 13 min | English |
| Roxanne Roxanne | March 23, 2018 | Musical drama | 1 h 40 min | English |
| Happy Anniversary | March 30, 2018 | Romantic comedy | 1 h 18 min | English |
| First Match | March 30, 2018 | Sports-drama | 1 h 42 min | English |
| 6 Balloons | April 6, 2018 | Drama | 1 h 15 min | English |
| Amateur | April 6, 2018 | Sports-drama | 1 h 36 min | English |
| Come Sunday | April 13, 2018 | Biopic | 1 h 45 min | English |
| I Am Not an Easy Man | April 13, 2018 | Romantic comedy | 1 h 38 min | French |
| Dude | April 20, 2018 | Teen comedy drama | 1 h 37 min | English |
| Candy Jar | April 27, 2018 | Romantic comedy | 1 h 32 min | English |
| The Week Of | April 27, 2018 | Comedy | 1 h 56 min | English |
| Sometimes | May 1, 2018 | Drama | 1 h 41 min | Tamil |
| Forgive Us Our Debts | May 4, 2018 | Drama | 1 h 44 min | Italian |
| The Kissing Booth | May 11, 2018 | Teen romantic comedy | 1 h 46 min | English |
| Cargo | May 18, 2018 | Drama / Horror | 1 h 44 min | English |
| Ibiza | May 25, 2018 | Comedy | 1 h 34 min | English |
| Sara's Notebook | May 25, 2018 | Drama | 1 h 56 min | Spanish |
| Alex Strangelove | June 8, 2018 | Romantic comedy | 1 h 39 min | English |
| Set It Up | June 15, 2018 | Romantic comedy | 1 h 45 min | English |
| Lust Stories | June 15, 2018 | Drama anthology | 2 h | Hindi |
| To Each, Her Own | June 24, 2018 | Romantic comedy | 1 h 35 min | French |
| Calibre | June 29, 2018 | Thriller | 1 h 41 min | English |
| TAU | June 29, 2018 | Science fiction thriller | 1 h 37 min | English |
| The Legacy of a Whitetail Deer Hunter | July 6, 2018 | Adventure comedy | 1 h 23 min | English |
| How It Ends | July 13, 2018 | Action-thriller | 1 h 53 min | English |
| Father of the Year | July 20, 2018 | Comedy | 1 h 34 min | English |
| Duck Duck Goose | July 20, 2018 | CGI animation comedy | 1 h 32 min | English |
| Extinction | July 27, 2018 | Science fiction thriller | 1 h 35 min | English |
| Brij Mohan Amar Rahe | August 3, 2018 | Action comedy | 1 h 40 min | Hindi |
| Like Father | August 3, 2018 | Comedy drama | 1 h 43 min | English |
| The Package | August 10, 2018 | Black comedy | 1 h 34 min | English |
| To All the Boys I've Loved Before | August 17, 2018 | Teen romantic comedy | 1 h 40 min | English |
| The After Party | August 24, 2018 | Comedy | 1 h 29 min | English |
| Sierra Burgess Is a Loser | September 7, 2018 | Teen romantic comedy drama | 1 h 46 min | English |
| The Most Assassinated Woman in the World | September 7, 2018 | Mystery | 1 h 42 min | French |
| On My Skin | September 12, 2018 | Crime drama | 1 h 40 min | Italian |
| The Land of Steady Habits | September 14, 2018 | Comedy drama | 1 h 38 min | English |
| The Angel | September 14, 2018 | Spy thriller | 1 h 54 min | English |
| Nappily Ever After | September 21, 2018 | Comedy drama | 1 h 38 min | English |
| Hold the Dark | September 28, 2018 | Action thriller | 2 h 5 min | English |
| Private Life | October 5, 2018 | Drama | 2 h 4 min | English |
| 22 July | October 10, 2018 | Crime drama | 2 h 24 min | English |
| Apostle | October 12, 2018 | Horror | 2 h 10 min | English |
| The Night Comes for Us | October 19, 2018 | Action-thriller | 2 h | Indonesian |
| Been So Long | October 26, 2018 | Musical | 1 h 40 min | English |
| The Holiday Calendar | November 2, 2018 | Christmas romantic comedy | 1 h 35 min | English |
| The Other Side of the Wind | November 2, 2018 | Drama | 2 h 2 min | English |
| Outlaw King | November 9, 2018 | Historical-epic | 2 h 1 min | English |
| The Princess Switch | November 16, 2018 | Christmas romantic comedy | 1 h 42 min | English |
| Cam | November 16, 2018 | Psychological horror | 1 h 34 min | English |
| The Ballad of Buster Scruggs | November 16, 2018 | Western anthology | 2 h 13 min | English |
| The Christmas Chronicles | November 22, 2018 | Christmas / Fantasy / Adventure / Comedy | 1 h 45 min | English |
| A Christmas Prince: The Royal Wedding | November 30, 2018 | Christmas romantic comedy | 1 h 33 min | English |
| Rajma Chawal | November 30, 2018 | Comedy drama | 1 h 58 min | Hindi |
| 5 Star Christmas | December 7, 2018 | Christmas comedy | 1 h 35 min | Italian |
| Mowgli: Legend of the Jungle | December 7, 2018 | Adventure | 1 h 44 min | English |
| Roma | December 14, 2018 | Drama | 2 h 14 min | Spanish |
| Bird Box | December 21, 2018 | Psychological thriller | 2 h 4 min | English |

== Documentaries ==
| Title | Release date | Runtime | Language |
|---|---|---|---|
| Seeing Allred | February 9, 2018 | 1 h 35 min | English |
| The Trader | February 9, 2018 | 23 min | Georgian |
| Ladies First | March 8, 2018 | 39 min | Hindi |
| Take Your Pills | March 16, 2018 | 1 h 27 min | English |
| Ram Dass, Going Home | April 6, 2018 | 31 min | English |
| Mercury 13 | April 20, 2018 | 1 h 19 min | English |
| The Rachel Divide | April 27, 2018 | 1 h 44 min | English |
| End Game | May 4, 2018 | 40 min | English |
| Recovery Boys | June 29, 2018 | 1 h 29 min | English |
| The Bleeding Edge | July 27, 2018 | 1 h 40 min | English |
| City of Joy | September 7, 2018 | 1 h 16 min | English |
| Reversing Roe | September 13, 2018 | 1 h 39 min | English |
| Quincy | September 21, 2018 | 2 h 4 min | English |
| Two Catalonias | September 28, 2018 | 1 h 56 min | Spanish |
| Lessons from a School Shooting: Notes from Dunblane | September 28, 2018 | 23 min | English |
| Feminists: What Were They Thinking? | October 12, 2018 | 1 h 26 min | English |
| ReMastered: Who Shot the Sheriff? | October 12, 2018 | 57 min | English |
| Shirkers | October 26, 2018 | 1 h 37 min | English |
| They'll Love Me When I'm Dead | November 2, 2018 | 1 h 38 min | English |
| ReMastered: Tricky Dick & the Man in Black | November 2, 2018 | 58 min | English |
| The American Meme | December 7, 2018 | 1 h 38 min | English |
| ReMastered: Who Killed Jam Master Jay? | December 7, 2018 | 58 min | English |
| Out of Many, One | December 12, 2018 | 34 min | English |
| Struggle: The Life and Lost Art of Szukalski | December 21, 2018 | 1 h 45 min | English |

== Specials ==
These programs are one-time original events or supplementary content related to original films.

| Title | Release date | Genre | Runtime | Language |
|---|---|---|---|---|
| Loudon Wainwright III: Surviving Twin | November 13, 2018 | One-man show | 1 h 31 min | English |
| Angela's Christmas | November 30, 2018 | Animation | 30 min | English |
| Springsteen on Broadway | December 16, 2018 | One-man show | 2 h 33 min | English |
| Porta dos Fundos: The Last Hangover | December 21, 2018 | Comedy | 44 min | Portuguese |
| Taylor Swift: Reputation Stadium Tour | December 31, 2018 | Concert film | 2 h 5 min | English |

== Shorts ==
These are programs that have a runtime of less than 20 minutes.

| Title | Release date | Genre | Runtime | Language |
|---|---|---|---|---|
| Zion | August 10, 2018 | Documentary | 11 min | English |
