= List of 30 for 30 films =

30 for 30 is an ESPN documentary film series on interesting people and events from the history of sports. It consists of 4 "volumes", each 30 episodes long, the ESPN Films Presents series that consisted of 13 episodes from 2011 to 2012, 30 for 30 Shorts, available on the ESPN.com website, Soccer Stories, which aired before the 2014 FIFA World Cup, and 30 for 30 Podcasts, launched June 2017.

== Series overview ==
Series	Episodes	Originally released	
Series	Episodes	First released	Last released
Volume I	30	October 6, 2009	December 11, 2010
ESPN Films Presents	14	March 13, 2011	February 12, 2015
Shorts	TBA	May 15, 2012	TBA
Volume II	30	October 2, 2012	July 30, 2015
Soccer Stories	8	April 15, 2014	July 1, 2014
Volume III	30	October 13, 2015	July 2, 2019
Volume IV	33	September 10, 2019	TBA

== Volume I ==
Unless otherwise noted, the following films are all 60 minutes in length (including commercials).

No. overall	No. in series	Title	Directed by	Original release date	US viewers (millions)
1	1	Kings Ransom	Peter Berg	October 6, 2009	0.645
The August 9, 1988 trade of Wayne Gretzky from the Edmonton Oilers to the Los Angeles Kings and the effect it had on Gretzky, the fans in Edmonton, and the popularity of hockey in Southern California.
2	2	The Band That Wouldn't Die	Barry Levinson	October 13, 2009	N/A
A profile of Baltimore's love affair with football and the Colts, focusing on the Colts Marching Band. After the Colts decamped for Indianapolis in 1984, the band stayed behind to help promote the eventual return of the NFL to the city in the form of the Ravens.
3	3	Small Potatoes: Who Killed the USFL?	Mike Tollin	October 20, 2009	N/A
Fresh interviews and archival footage track the life and demise of the United States Football League in the mid-1980s. A highlight is Tollin's interview with Donald Trump, the former New Jersey Generals owner whose post-interview comments on the league give this documentary its title.
4	4	Muhammad and Larry	Albert Maysles	October 27, 2009	N/A
A look at the October 1980 Muhammad Ali–Larry Holmes fight and its impact on both fighters, featuring fresh interviews with participants and previously unseen lead-up footage from both fighters' camps.
5	5	Without Bias	Kirk Fraser	November 3, 2009	N/A
The death of Len Bias from a cocaine-induced heart attack, two days after Boston selected him as the second overall pick in the 1986 NBA draft, and its impact on casual drug use, especially by the sports community.
6	6	The Legend of Jimmy the Greek	Fritz Mitchell	November 10, 2009	N/A
The life of Jimmy "the Greek" Snyder, from his career as a Las Vegas bookmaker to his tenure on The NFL Today, from which he was fired in 1988.
7	7	The U	Billy Corben	December 12, 2009	2.368
The racial and cultural evolution of Miami during the 1980s as represented within the University of Miami football team. (2 hours in length)
8	8	Winning Time: Reggie Miller vs. the New York Knicks	Dan Klores	March 14, 2010	N/A
The impact of Reggie Miller of the Indiana Pacers on the New York Knicks in the 1990s, specifically focusing on the Pacers/Knicks battles in the 1994 and 1995 NBA playoffs and on Miller's interaction with Knicks fan Spike Lee.
9	9	Guru of Go	Bill Couturié	April 3, 2010	N/A
A profile of Paul Westhead's coaching tenure at Loyola Marymount University (1985–1990), where his Lions team was known for its high-scoring run-and-gun offense, use of talented players such as Bo Kimble and Hank Gathers, and a pall cast by Gathers's on-court death in 1990.
10	10	No Crossover: The Trial of Allen Iverson	Steve James	April 13, 2010	N/A
The 1993 trial of Hampton, Virginia high school athlete Allen Iverson, convicted for his role in a racially tinged melee, and its impact on both the community and on Iverson's life. (90 minutes in length)
11	11	Silly Little Game	Adam Kurland and Lucas Jansen	April 20, 2010	N/A
Meeting at New York City's La Rotisserie Francaise restaurant in 1980, a group of writers and academics develop Rotisserie Fantasy baseball, only to see it take off in popularity and leave them behind.
12	12	Run Ricky Run	Sean Pamphilon and Royce Toni	April 27, 2010	0.972
A profile of Ricky Williams focuses on his brief 2004 departure from the NFL, when he sought self-redemption amidst media criticism and fresh rumors of marijuana use.
13	13	The 16th Man	Clifford Bestall, Lori McCreary, and Morgan Freeman	May 4, 2010	0.463
How hosting (and winning) the 1995 Rugby World Cup, combined with Nelson Mandela's support of the Springboks national team, affected post-apartheid South Africa.
14	14	Straight Outta L.A.	Ice Cube	May 11, 2010	N/A
The relationship between the Raiders and the minority fan base in Los Angeles during the team's 13 seasons in L.A. (1982–1994)
15	15	June 17th, 1994	Brett Morgen	June 16, 2010	N/A
Quick-cut archival footage captures the various US sporting events on the day in question and the emotions they generated, including the opening of the World Cup soccer tournament, the Knicks/Rockets NBA Finals, Arnold Palmer's last round in the U.S. Open, and the New York Rangers' Stanley Cup victory celebration. One event, however, overshadows them all: O. J. Simpson's run from the police.
16	16	The Two Escobars	Jeff Zimbalist and Michael Zimbalist	June 22, 2010	N/A
The lives of soccer player Andrés Escobar and drug lord Pablo Escobar; the intertwining of crime and soccer in their native Colombia; and the connections between the deaths of both men. (2 hours in length)
17	17	The Birth of Big Air	Jeff Tremaine	July 29, 2010	N/A
The life of Mat Hoffman and his 25-year career of advancing, in creative and promotional avenues, BMX riding.
18	18	Jordan Rides the Bus	Ron Shelton	August 24, 2010	N/A
Motivated by the dream his late father had for him, Michael Jordan retires from basketball and has a brief career in minor league baseball.
19	19	Little Big Men	Al Szymanski	August 31, 2010	N/A
A look at the Kirkland National Little League team's success at the 1982 Little League World Series, examining why their title win is considered one of the biggest upsets in the event's history.
20	20	One Night in Vegas	Reggie Rock Bythewood	September 7, 2010	N/A
The friendship of boxer Mike Tyson and rapper Tupac Shakur and the night of September 7, 1996, when Shakur was murdered after attending the Tyson-Bruce Seldon fight in Las Vegas.
21	21	Unmatched	Lisa Lax and Nancy Stern, with Hannah Storm	September 14, 2010	N/A
A look at the rivalry and friendship between tennis legends Chris Evert and Martina Navratilova.
22	22	The House of Steinbrenner	Barbara Kopple	September 21, 2010	N/A
The legacy of George Steinbrenner's ownership of the New York Yankees.
23	23	Into the Wind	Steve Nash and Ezra Holland	September 28, 2010 (Note: Into the Wind had its premiere on Canada's TSN2 on September 19, 2010.)	0.894
Terry Fox's attempt to run 5,373 kilometres (3,339 mi) across Canada in support of fundraising for cancer research captures the attention of his fellow Canadians and the world.
24	24	Four Days in October	Gary Waksman	October 5, 2010	1.45
The remarkable comeback of the Boston Red Sox against the New York Yankees in the 2004 ALCS.
25	25	Once Brothers	Michael Tolajian	October 12, 2010	N/A
The story of Croatian Dražen Petrović and Serbian Vlade Divac, NBA players and Yugoslavian national teammates, and how upheaval in their homeland adversely and irretrievably affected their friendship. (90 minutes in length)
26	26	Tim Richmond: To the Limit	NASCAR Media Group and Rory Karpf	October 19, 2010	N/A
The career of NASCAR driver Tim Richmond, his flamboyant lifestyle, and his 1989 death from AIDS.
27	27	Fernando Nation	Cruz Angeles	October 26, 2010	N/A
The euphoria created by Fernando Valenzuela's 1981 arrival with the Los Angeles Dodgers.
28	28	Marion Jones: Press Pause	John Singleton	November 2, 2010	N/A
The successful track and field career of Marion Jones, her 2007 admission of performance-enhancing drug use, and subsequent prison sentence.
29	29	The Best That Never Was	Jonathan Hock	November 9, 2010	2.229
The 1981 recruiting of high school football player Marcus Dupree by multiple big-time college programs, his resulting injury-prone college and professional career, and how his pursuit by college and USFL teams changed the recruiting process. (2 hours in length)
30	30	Pony Excess	Thaddeus D. Matula	December 11, 2010	2.517
The rise, fall, and rebirth of the SMU Mustangs football program, which received a 1-year "death penalty" for major infractions after former SMU player David Stanley blew the whistle on the long-suspected program. Patrick Duffy, known for starring in television's Dallas at the time of the scandal, narrates. (2 hours in length)

=== ESPN Films Presents ===
Other films were previously announced for Volume I of the series but were not included. These films, which began airing in 2011, are a continuation of 30 for 30, dealing with more sports stories that 30 for 30 did not cover. According to 30 for 30 producer Bill Simmons, "We're spinning off the 30 for 30 series next year into something that will probably be called 30 for 30 Presents or something like that... So even though the SMU doc will be the 30th one (right after the Heisman ceremony) don't think the spirit of the series is going away." These additional films include:

No. overall	No. in series	Title	Directed by	Original release date	US viewers (millions)
31	1	The Fab Five	Jason Hehir	March 13, 2011	2.1
The story of the 1991 Michigan men's basketball recruiting class, called the Fab Five, one of whom (Chris Webber) was later involved in a notorious pay-for-play scandal.
32	2	Catching Hell	Alex Gibney	September 27, 2011	1.379
The relationship between Chicago Cubs fans and Steve Bartman following Game 6 of the 2003 National League Championship Series
33	3	Renée	Eric Drath	October 4, 2011	0.508
The life of transgender athlete Renée Richards, who shocked the world with her entry into the 1977 US Open.
34	4	The Dotted Line	Morgan Spurlock	October 11, 2011	0.939
Sports agents Peter Greenberg and Eugene Lee are profiled with their clients Johan Santana, Jacquian Williams and Robert Hughes.
35	5	Charismatic	Steven Michaels, Joel Surnow, and Jonathan Koch	October 18, 2011	0.672
The run of Charismatic and his jockey, Chris Antley, at the 1999 Triple Crown.
36	6	The Real Rocky	Jeff Feuerzeig	October 25, 2011	1.386
A profile of Chuck Wepner, the original inspiration for Sylvester Stallone's Rocky Balboa character, and how Rocky-like glory eluded Wepner as he took several strange turns in an effort to stay in the spotlight.
37	7	Unguarded	Johnathan Hock	November 1, 2011	1.377
The story of Chris Herren, a high school basketball star and NBA player; his career-long struggles with drug abuse; and his ultimate discovery of redemption and personal fulfillment through the game.
38	8	Roll Tide/War Eagle	Martin Khodabakhshian	November 8, 2011	1.698
The continuing rivalry between Auburn University and the University of Alabama, focusing on the history between the two programs, the bad blood between their fans, and how this intense rivalry came to a pinnacle, just when they ended up needing each other most.
39	9	The Marinovich Project	Andrew Stephan and John Dorsey	December 10, 2011	2.131
A look at the rise and fall of former USC and NFL quarterback Todd Marinovich, focusing primarily on the complex relationship between Marinovich and his father.
40	10	Goose	Kevin Shaw	February 26, 2012	0.349
The life of Reece "Goose" Tatum who played in Negro league baseball and was an original member of the legendary Harlem Globetrotters.
41	11	The Announcement	Nelson George	March 11, 2012	2.047
The events and aftermath of former Los Angeles Lakers player Magic Johnson announcing to the world that he tested positive for HIV.
42	12	26 Years: The Dewey Bozella Story	Jose Morales	March 15, 2012	N/A
Life of Dewey Bozella and his 26 years behind bars, where he found strength and purpose through boxing (becoming the light heavyweight champion of Sing Sing prison), and his goal to be proven innocent and fight professionally once he was released.
43	13	Right to Play	Frank Marshall	June 2, 2012	N/A
The story of Norwegian speed-skating gold medalist Johann Olav Koss, who founded the non-profit organization Right to Play, which brings sports to children in third-world and war-torn countries.
71	14	The Little Master	Gotham Chopra	February 12, 2015 (Note: The Little Master premiered on ESPN Caribbean on February 12, 2015, followed by ESPN in the US on February 15 and in Australia and New Zealand on February 22.)	N/A
The life and impact of Indian cricket legend Sachin Tendulkar, set against the backdrop of the 2011 Cricket World Cup, Tendulkar's final attempt to lead his country to one-day cricket's ultimate prize. Narrated by Deepak Chopra, the director's father.

== Volume II ==
On May 15, 2012, it was announced that the 30 for 30 series would return in October 2012, with 30 all new documentaries. The documentaries were integrated with Grantland.com by podcasts, feature stories and oral histories.

Unless otherwise noted, the following films are all 90 minutes in length (including commercials).

No. overall	No. in series	Title	Directed by	Original release date	US viewers (millions)
44	1	Broke	Billy Corben	October 2, 2012 (Note: This film had its premiere at the Tribeca Film Festival.)	2.528
An exploration of the road to fortune in sports and the eventual detours (for various reasons) to financial difficulties and bankruptcy, as experienced by top athletes including Leon Searcy, Andre Rison, Keith McCants, Bernie Kosar, and Cliff Floyd.
45	2	9.79*	Daniel Gordon	October 9, 2012	1.313
A profile of the Men's 100-meter final at the 1988 Summer Olympics and the lives of the eight men who participated, including Ben Johnson (whose world record of 9.79 seconds was annulled after he tested positive for anabolic steroids) and Carl Lewis (who was awarded the gold medal after Johnson's disqualification).
46	3	There's No Place Like Home	Maura Mandt and Josh Swade	October 16, 2012	1.007
The story of one fan's obsessive quest to purchase, at a 2010 auction, James Naismith's original rules of basketball, perhaps the most important historical document in American sports history, and to bring it "home" to Lawrence, Kansas, where Naismith taught and coached at the University of Kansas for 39 years. (70 minutes in length)
47	4	Benji	Coodie and Chike	October 23, 2012	1.488
The life of Ben Wilson, a well-regarded Chicago high school basketball star, and how his November 1984 murder (one day before the start of his senior season) had a wide-ranging impact.
48	5	Ghosts of Ole Miss	Fritz Mitchell	October 30, 2012	1.023
Mississippi native Wright Thompson explores the tumultuous events of 1962, when the University of Mississippi campus both erupted in violence over integration and swelled with pride over its unbeaten football team, and how those incidents continue to shape the state 50 years later. (60 minutes in length)
49	6	You Don't Know Bo	Michael Bonfiglio	December 8, 2012	3.600
A profile of Bo Jackson and how his college and professional feats in two sports (baseball and football) captured the public's imagination and made Jackson a cultural — and marketing — icon.
50	7	Survive and Advance	Jonathan Hock	March 17, 2013	1.603
A look at the NC State Wolfpack men's basketball team's successful and improbable championship runs through the 1983 ACC and NCAA tournaments. (2 hrs in length)
51	8	Elway to Marino	Ken Rodgers	April 23, 2013	1.060
Tom Selleck narrates this look at the 1983 NFL draft and the six quarterbacks taken in its first round, specifically John Elway (the first overall pick) and Dan Marino (the last QB picked in Round 1). The film features the recollections of Martin Demoff, the agent for both Elway and Marino, who shares a personal diary he kept to chronicle teams' interest in his two future Hall of Fame clients, notes that include the Baltimore Colts' indecision over drafting Elway first or trading the pick away, and the plummeting of Marino's stature following weak senior-year stats and rumors of recreational drug use.
52	9	Hawaiian: The Legend of Eddie Aikau	Sam George	October 1, 2013	0.791
A chronicling of the life of Eddie Aikau, a big wave surfer and lifeguard whose death served as inspiration to an entire spiritual movement.
53	10	Free Spirits	Daniel H. Forer	October 8, 2013	0.699
The story of the colorful figures who made up the American Basketball Association's Spirits of St. Louis, and how Spirits owners Ozzie and Daniel Silna, with their team about to be left out in the ABA's merger with the NBA, managed to negotiate a deal that allowed the brothers' involvement in pro basketball to continue in a most unusual fashion. (60 minutes in length)
54	11	No Más	Eric Drath	October 15, 2013	1.343
An inside look at a pair of boxing matches between Sugar Ray Leonard and Roberto Durán in the 1980s, with insight from boxing experts, family members and the two fighters themselves.
55	12	Big Shot	Kevin Connolly	October 22, 2013	1.07
The story of how young businessman John Spano struck a deal to purchase the New York Islanders in 1996, only to be later revealed as a fraud and being near financial insolvency.
56	13	This Is What They Want	Brian Koppelman and David Levien	October 29, 2013	0.866
The story of a 39-year-old Jimmy Connors and his unexpected and extraordinary underdog run at the 1991 US Open, where he played as a wildcard entrant and reached the semi-finals of the men's singles draw.
57	14	Bernie and Ernie	Jason Hehir	November 5, 2013	1.125
A profile of Bernard King and Ernie Grunfeld, their decades-long friendship, and their on-court partnership on the University of Tennessee basketball team, better known as the "Ernie and Bernie Show".
58	15	Youngstown Boys	Jeff Zimbalist and Michael Zimbalist	December 14, 2013	1.967
The stories of two Ohio State football figures connected with Youngstown, Ohio, running back Maurice Clarett (a native of the city) and coach Jim Tressel (former head coach at Youngstown State University), their football exploits at OSU (including a national championship in 2002), and their scandalous exits from the school. (2 hours in length)
59	16	The Price of Gold	Nanette Burstein	January 16, 2014	1.515
A profile of a January 6, 1994 incident at the U.S. Figure Skating Championships, where an unknown attacker strikes entrant Nancy Kerrigan — an assailant that is later revealed to be a hit man hired by the ex-husband of Kerrigan's rival, Tonya Harding, as part of a plan to prevent Kerrigan from competing in the 1994 Winter Olympics. Note: The Price of Gold originally went by the title Tonya and Nancy during production.
60	17	Requiem for the Big East	Ezra Edelman	March 16, 2014	1.456
A recollection of the original Big East Conference, from its simple beginnings and regional rivalries to its national prominence as one of the most successful college basketball leagues, and how it ended up fighting for its survival in the 2010s during conference realignment. (2 hours in length)
61	18	Bad Boys	Zak Levitt	April 17, 2014	1.830
A look back at the Detroit Pistons of the late 1980s and early 1990s. Narrated by rapper Kid Rock, a native of nearby Romeo, Michigan. (2 hours in length)
62	19	Slaying the Badger	John Dower	July 22, 2014	N/A
An examination of the competitive nature that teammates Greg LeMond and Bernard Hinault exhibited in the 1986 Tour de France; a film based on Richard Moore's book of the same name.
63	20	Playing for the Mob	Joe Lavine and Cayman Grant	October 7, 2014	N/A
How Mafia associate Henry Hill orchestrated a point-shaving scheme involving Boston College basketball. Narrated by Ray Liotta, who portrayed Hill in Goodfellas.
64	21	The Day the Series Stopped	Ryan Fleck	October 14, 2014	N/A
A 25-year retrospective of the Loma Prieta earthquake, which struck just before the scheduled start of Game 3 of the 1989 World Series.
65	22	When the Garden Was Eden	Michael Rapaport	October 21, 2014	N/A
A look back at the New York Knicks' championship teams of the 1970s.
66	23	Brian and The Boz	Thaddeus D. Matula	October 28, 2014	N/A
Former linebacker Brian Bosworth unveils a storage locker to his son Max that contains memorabilia from his college and brief professional career. The elder Bosworth reflects on his life and career, making note of an emerging second persona — The Boz — that had begun to subsume his life.
67	24	Brothers in Exile	Mario Diaz and MLB Productions	November 4, 2014 (Note: Brothers in Exile premiered on ESPN Deportes on November 1, 2014, in Spanish, followed by its English premiere on ESPN on November 4, 2014.)	N/A
The story of Liván and Orlando Hernández, half-brothers who fled Cuba separately and became successful major-league pitchers.
68	25	Rand University	Marquis Daisy	November 11, 2014	N/A
An exploration of former NFL receiver Randy Moss and his humble (and humbling) origins in Rand, West Virginia. (60 minutes in length)
69	26	The U Part 2	Billy Corben	December 13, 2014	N/A
A sequel to The U profiles the Miami Hurricanes football program and its rise from scandal (and calls for the school to drop the sport) to a national championship, only to see new controversy after booster Nevin Shapiro is revealed to have given improper benefits to the program. (2 hours in length)
70	27	Of Miracles and Men	Jonathan Hock	February 8, 2015	N/A
An exploration of the Miracle on Ice from the point of view of the defeated Soviet Union team. The film features defenseman Viacheslav Fetisov returning to Lake Placid to recollect his team's defeat. (2 hours in length)
72	28	I Hate Christian Laettner	Rory Karpf	March 15, 2015	2.319
A look at the life and basketball career of Christian Laettner and the intense dislike some fans still harbor for the former Duke University and NBA star.
73	29	Sole Man	Jon Weinbach and Dan Marks	April 16, 2015	N/A
A profile of Sonny Vaccaro, who rose from steel town roots in Pennsylvania to become an influential force in both basketball and the athletic shoe industry.
74	30	Angry Sky	Jeff Tremaine	July 30, 2015	N/A
The story of Nick Piantanida, a New Jersey pet store owner and truck driver whose love of parachuting and skydiving puts him on a quest to break the record for the highest recorded parachute jump.

== Volume III ==
In September 2015, it was announced that 30 for 30 would return for a third volume of 30 films, beginning in October 2015.

No. overall	No. in series	Title	Directed by	Original release date	US viewers (millions)
75	1	Trojan War	Aaron Rahsaan Thomas	October 13, 2015	0.941
A profile of the rise and fall of USC Trojans football during Pete Carroll's coaching tenure in the 2000s.
76	2	The Prince of Pennsylvania	Jesse Vile	October 20, 2015	0.733
An exploration of the turbulent relationship between Olympic wrestling brothers Mark and Dave Schultz and their eccentric benefactor, John du Pont, culminating in the murder of Dave by du Pont.
77	3	The Gospel According to Mac	Jim Podhoretz	November 3, 2015	1.012
A look at how Bill McCartney mixed two religions—college football and evangelical Christianity—while serving as head coach of the Colorado Buffaloes in the 1990s, a tenure that included a national championship.
78	4	Chasing Tyson	Steven Cantor	November 10, 2015	1.203
A look at how Evander Holyfield spent years (1989–91 & 1995–96) trying to arrange his first fight with Mike Tyson in an effort to gain the respect he knew he could only gain by defeating Tyson in the ring.
79	5	Four Falls of Buffalo	Ken Rodgers	December 12, 2015 (Note: Four Falls of Buffalo debuted at the North Park Theater in Buffalo, New York, on December 9, 2015, three days before its premiere on ESPN.)	1.490
A profile of the Buffalo Bills teams of the early 1990s, when the franchise became the first team to play in—and lose—four consecutive Super Bowls.
80	6	The '85 Bears	Jason Hehir	February 4, 2016	1.425
A 30-year retrospective on the 1985 Chicago Bears, from how they were assembled to their swaggering, dominant run to Super Bowl victory.
81	7	Fantastic Lies	Marina Zenovich	March 13, 2016	1.474
A 10-year retrospective of the Duke lacrosse case, in which a party thrown by members of the school's men's lacrosse team led to an accusation of rape—a claim that, though later proven to be false, ignited both a firestorm that damaged the school's prestige and an investigation that ruined careers.
82	8	This Magic Moment	Erin Leyden and Gentry Kirby	April 14, 2016	1.509
A profile of the Orlando Magic teams of the mid-1990s, led by Shaquille O'Neal and Penny Hardaway, who gained prominence both on the NBA hardwoods and in popular culture, before Shaq's departure to the Los Angeles Lakers in free agency and injury issues for Penny ended the Magic's budding dynasty before it could ever take flight.
83	9	Believeland	Andy Billman	May 14, 2016	0.844
A look at the sports curse that befell Cleveland since the NFL's Browns last brought a major pro sports championship to the Ohio city in 1964. Debuting one month before LeBron James and the Cavaliers' won the 2016 NBA Finals, the film would be re-released on June 30, 2016 with an updated ending reflecting the Cavs' win.
84	10	Doc & Darryl	Judd Apatow and Michael Bonfiglio	July 14, 2016 (Note: This film premiered at the 2016 AFI Docs festival on June 26.)	1.196
The connection between the lives and careers of former New York Mets Dwight "Doc" Gooden and Darryl Strawberry.
85	11	Phi Slama Jama	Chip Rives	October 18, 2016	N/A
A profile of the iconic Houston Cougars men's basketball teams of the 1980s, fronted by Hakeem Olajuwon and Clyde Drexler, whose explosive play and highlight-making slam dunks earned the team the nickname Phi Slama Jama.
86	12	Hit It Hard	David Terry Fine and Gabe Spitzer	November 1, 2016	N/A
A look at John Daly's rise from obscurity to two major golf championship wins and fall back to mediocrity.
87	13	Catholics vs. Convicts	Patrick Creadon	December 10, 2016	2.109
A look at the notorious 1988 Notre Dame–Miami football game and its personal and cultural impact. Creadon was a senior at Notre Dame when the game took place; his roommate that year was one of the people behind the controversial t-shirt that gave the game, and this film, its name. (2 hours in length)
88	14	This Was the XFL	Charlie Ebersol	February 2, 2017	N/A
Two longtime friends, pro wrestling impresario Vince McMahon and NBC Sports president Dick Ebersol (the director's father), team to form the XFL; the film follows the league's rushed development, its innovative approaches to televised football, and its rapid implosion. The ending foreshadows McMahon's plans to launch a new XFL in 2020 and the Ebersols' upcoming involvement in the competing Alliance of American Football in 2019.
89	15	One and Not Done	Jonathan Hock	April 13, 2017	N/A
The life and career of John Calipari, one of the most polarizing figures in modern college basketball, weaving his story around that of his 2015–16 Kentucky team.
90	16	Celtics/Lakers: Best of Enemies	Jim Podhoretz	June 13, 2017 (Parts 1 & 2); June 14, 2017 (Part 3)	N/A
A three-part series, initially airing on consecutive nights, exploring the Celtics–Lakers rivalry, focusing mainly on the 1980s era of Larry Bird and Magic Johnson but also examining the entire history of the NBA through the rivalry. (Parts 1 & 3: 2 hours in length; Part 2: 1 hour in length)
91	17	Mike and the Mad Dog	Daniel H. Forer	July 13, 2017	0.657
The careers of Mike Francesa and Chris Russo, their stormy 19-year partnership on New York City radio; and the duo's influence on their Big Apple audience and sports talk radio in general.
92	18	George Best: All by Himself	Daniel Gordon	July 20, 2017	0.360
George Best, Northern Ireland's legendary star, remains one of the most naturally gifted soccer players ever. Best's skill and exuberance lifted Manchester United, but his career was essentially over before he turned 29, the result of his battle with alcoholism.
93	19	What Carter Lost	Adam Hootnick	August 24, 2017	N/A
In any other year, the 1988 team from Dallas's Carter High School would have gone down as one of the greatest in Texas football history, featuring 28 players who received college scholarship offers, eight of whom would eventually play in the pros. Fighting off racial prejudice and being overshadowed by an opponent (Odessa Permian) that would be poularized in book and film, Carter would claim the state title, only to be rocked to their core by incidents that would affect the community's reputation to this day — an armed robbery involving six of their players, and a grades scandal that would lead the UIL to strip the team of their title.
94	20	Year of the Scab	John Dorsey	September 12, 2017	N/A
During the 1987 players' strike, the Washington Redskins field a roster of replacement players that goes 3–0 and helps pave the way for the Redskins' Super Bowl victory. Thirty years on, those players bear the stigma of being dismissed as "scabs" by fans in general and Washington management in particular.
95	21	Tommy	Gentry Kirby and Erin Leyden	September 13, 2017 (Note: Tommy was available exclusively on the ESPN app and on-demand beginning September 13, 2017, before making its broadcast premiere on September 27, 2017, on ESPN2.)	N/A
The unlikely rise and sudden fall of boxer Tommy Morrison.
96	22	Nature Boy	Rory Karpf	November 7, 2017	1.831
The life and times of professional wrestling legend Ric Flair.
97	23	The Two Bills	Ken Rodgers	February 1, 2018	N/A
A look at the relationship between NFL coaches Bill Parcells and Bill Belichick. Co-produced with NFL Films.
98	24	The Last Days of Knight	Robert Abbott	April 12, 2018 (Note: This film premiered on ESPN+.) (Note: Television premiere on November 29, 2018.)	N/A
The saga surrounding Indiana University's firing of men's basketball coach Bob Knight in 2000.
99	25	Seau	Kirby Bradley	September 20, 2018 (Note: Television premiere on April 16, 2019.)	N/A
The life of NFL legend Junior Seau, from his upbringing in a Samoan immigrant family, through his path to NFL superstardom and status as a league icon, ending in his untimely death from a seemingly inexplicable suicide in 2012.
100	26	42 to 1	Ben Houser and Jeremy Schaap	December 11, 2018	N/A
A chronicle of Buster Douglas's shocking knockout of the then-undefeated Mike Tyson at the Tokyo Dome on February 11, 1990.
101	27	Deion's Double Play	Ken Rodgers and Erik Powers	January 31, 2019	1.15
A look at Pro Football Hall of Famer Deion Sanders, focusing specifically on a 24-hour span in 1992 when he sandwiched an NFL game between a pair of Major League Baseball postseason games in cities separated by 1,000 miles.
102	28	The Dominican Dream	Jonathan Hock	April 30, 2019	0.347
The highs and lows of Felipe López, born into a family of Dominican immigrants to become a star high school and (at St. John's) collegiate basketball player, and the contentment he finds after a less-than-successful pro career.
103	29	Qualified	Jenna Ricker	May 28, 2019	0.360
How Janet Guthrie faced scorn, skepticism, and subpar equipment to shock the racing world by becoming the first female driver to qualify for the Indianapolis 500.
104	30	The Good, The Bad, The Hungry	Nicole Lucas Haimes	July 2, 2019	0.450
A look at one of the biggest rivalries in sports, that of competitive eaters Takeru Kobayashi and Joey Chestnut.

=== O.J.: Made in America ===
O.J.: Made in America, which was directed by Ezra Edelman, was billed as a "mini-series event" in the 30 for 30 series. The five-part documentary series examines the life of O. J. Simpson, as well as the broader issues of race and celebrity in the United States as it pertained to Simpson's 1995 criminal trial for the murders of his ex-wife, Nicole Brown Simpson, and her acquaintance, Ronald Lyle Goldman. Made in America also focuses on other aspects in Simpson's life, including his success on the football field, his celebrity away from the gridiron, and his later conviction and imprisonment in a robbery case. Part 1 aired on June 11, 2016, with Parts 2–5 airing on June 14, 15, 17 and 18, respectively. (Note: This film had its theatrical premiere at the Sundance Film Festival.)

The series received week-long theatrical releases in Los Angeles County and New York City before being broadcast, qualifying it for Oscar consideration. It ultimately received the Academy Award for Best Documentary Feature at the 89th Academy Awards.

== Volume IV ==
On January 7, 2019, ESPN announced the next set of 30 For 30 documentaries. In March 2020, ESPN announced that The Last Dance would air earlier on April 19, 2020, due to the high demand during the COVID-19 pandemic.

No. overall	No. in series	Title	Directed by	Original release date	US viewers (millions)
105	1	Rodman: For Better or Worse	Todd Kapostasy	September 10, 2019	1.07
The unfettered and definitive look at the life and career of Dennis Rodman.
106	2	Chuck & Tito	Micah Brown	October 15, 2019	0.609
The hot-and-cold relationship between MMA fighters Chuck Liddell and Tito Ortiz, from the start of UFC through its rise in popularity and to the present day.
107	3	Vick	Stanley Nelson	January 30, 2020 (Part 1); February 6, 2020 (Part 2)	0.941; 0.681
A comprehensive look at Michael Vick’s saga, including his days as a prep, college, and NFL star; his ostracism (and prison sentence) for his involvement in a dog-fighting ring; and his polarizing return to public life.
108	4	LANCE	Marina Zenovich	May 24, 2020 (Part 1); May 31, 2020 (Part 2)	0.857; 0.756
Two-part examination of the life, career, and controversies of Lance Armstrong, featuring multiple interviews of the cyclist.
109	5	Be Water	Bao Nguyen	June 7, 2020	1.17
An exploration of the life and legacy of Bruce Lee as an acting and martial arts icon.
110	6	Long Gone Summer	AJ Schnack	June 14, 2020	1.06
A look back at the 1998 home run chase between Mark McGwire and Sammy Sosa.
111	7	The Life and Trials of Oscar Pistorius	Daniel Gordon	September 27, 2020 (Part 1); September 28, 2020 (Part 2); September 29, 2020 (Part 3); September 30, 2020 (Part 4) (Note: The documentary premiered exclusively on the ESPN+ streaming service. Subscribers had the option to view each part as it aired, or view the entire film on demand starting at the original air date.)	N/A
The life of South African Paralympic sprinter Oscar Pistorius, from his childhood during the last days of apartheid, to worldwide celebrity as the first double-leg amputee to compete in the able-bodied Olympics, to his conviction for killing his girlfriend.
112	8	The Infinite Race	Bernardo Ruiz	December 15, 2020	N/A
The story of the Tarahumara, a Mexican indigenous community famed for their legendary running ability (and preference to do so barefoot), how they inspired an ultra-running craze across the world, and what's happened as their homes and communities were ravaged by drug cartels and violence.
113	9	Al Davis vs. the NFL	Ken Rodgers	February 4, 2021	N/A
Using deepfake technology and content from the NFL Films archives, reconstructions of Raiders owner Al Davis and NFL commissioner Pete Rozelle tell the story of their contentious rivalry, in particular Davis's desire to move his team from Oakland to Los Angeles despite the league's objections.
114	10	Breakaway	Rudy Valdez	July 13, 2021	N/A
A look at the decision by Maya Moore, one of women's basketball's most decorated players, to step away from her sport to advocate for a man she believed to be wrongly imprisoned — a cause that changed her life in unexpected ways.
115	11	Once Upon a Time in Queens	Nick Davis	September 14, 2021 (Parts 1 & 2); September 15, 2021 (Parts 3 & 4)	.604, .643.464, .514
An in-depth examination of the 1986 New York Mets.
116	12	The Tuck Rule	Ken Rodgers & Nick Mascolo	February 6, 2022	N/A
A look at a January 2002 NFL playoff game where, thanks to a controversial rule, what appeared to be a fumble by Patriots quarterback Tom Brady (after being hit by Raiders cornerback Charles Woodson) was instead ruled an incomplete pass — and became a destiny-changing moment. The film features Brady and Woodson, former Michigan Wolverine teammates, re-watching the game together at Brady's home.
117	13	Shark	Jason Hehir & Thomas Odelfelt	April 19, 2022	N/A
A profile of professional golfer Greg Norman, and how his legendary career was shaped by a stunning collapse (from a 6-shot lead) in the final round of the 1996 Masters.
118	14	The Greatest Mixtape Ever	Chris Robinson and Set Free Richardson	May 31, 2022	N/A
A look at the AND1 Mixtapes and how their commingling of streetball footage with hip-hop beats impacted the sport of basketball.
119	15	Dream On	Kristen Lappas	June 15, 2022	N/A
A profile of the United States women's national basketball team of the mid-1990s, who won gold at the 1996 Olympics and helped change the landscape for women's basketball including the start of WNBA.
120	16	Jeanette Lee Vs.	Ursula Liang	December 13, 2022	N/A
A profile of Jeanette Lee and her rise to becoming one of professional billiards' most recognizable players.
121	17	Bullies of Baltimore	Ken Rodgers and Jason Weber	February 5, 2023	N/A
How a dominating defense and irrepressible personalities propelled the 2000 Baltimore Ravens to a Super Bowl victory. The film, produced in cooperation with NFL Films, is framed by a May 2022 reunion of the team's key figures. (2 hours in length)
122	18	The American Gladiators Documentary	Ben Berman	May 30, 2023 (Part 1); May 31, 2023 (Part 2)	N/A
A look back at American Gladiators, whose amateur vs. professional competitions (and David vs. Goliath storylines) captivated audiences for 7 years (1989-1996) and leaves it regarded as a forerunner of the competitive reality TV genre.
123	19	The Luckiest Guy in the World	Steve James	June 6, 2023 (Parts 1 & 2); June 13, 2023 (Parts 3 & 4)	N/A
A profile of Bill Walton and his colorful and divisive life in basketball, broadcasting, and activism.
124	20	The Great Heisman Race of 1997	Gentry Kirby	December 9, 2023	N/A
How the 1997 race for the Heisman Trophy began with one preseason favorite, Tennessee's Peyton Manning, and ended with several players having a legitimate shot at winning the prestigious award (including the eventual recipient, Michigan's Charles Woodson).
125	21	The Minister of Defense	Ken Rodgers and Courtland Bragg	December 13, 2023	N/A
A look at Reggie White's complex and sometimes controversial life as both a Hall of Fame defensive end and an ordained evangelical minister. The film features unseen footage from an interview White recorded before his death in 2004.
126	22	I'm Just Here for the Riot	Asia Youngman and Kathleen Jayme	June 4, 2024	N/A
The story of the Vancouver riot that followed the Canucks' loss in Game 7 of the 2011 Stanley Cup Final.
127	23	False Positive	Ismail Al-Amin	June 11, 2024	N/A
The story of Butch Reynolds, then-world record holder in the 400 metre sprint, and his 1990 suspension for alleged illegal drug use.
128	24	No Scope: The Story of FaZe Clan	Justin Staple	July 1, 2024	N/A
A history of Call of Duty clan turned esports organization FaZe Clan and their numerous tumultuous events throughout their decade-plus existence.
129	25	American Son	Jay Caspian Kang	July 29, 2024	N/A
A profile of Taiwanese-American tennis professional Michael Chang and his 1989 French Open men's singles championship, including his 4th-round upset over Ivan Lendl.
130	26	Dude Perfect: A Very Long Shot	Oliver Anderson and Louis Burgdorf	August 3, 2024	N/A
A look at content creators Dude Perfect examines their dramatic rise and the sacrifices they went through in the realm of sports-themed entertainment.
131	27	Stolen Gold	Suemay Oram	September 17, 2024	N/A
Ramón Torres confronts a deception within the Spanish basketball ID team he captained at the 2000 Summer Paralympics: Many of his teammates were revealed to not actually have intellectual disabilities (and were stripped of their gold-medal win as a result). (90 minutes in length)
132	28	The New York Sack Exchange	Ken Rodgers and James Weiner	December 13, 2024	N/A
A nostalgic look back at the defensive line of the 1980s New York Jets.
133	29	Empire Skate	Josh Swade	June 30, 2025	N/A
The story of New York City's distinctive skateboarding culture of the 1990s, which spawned the global brand Supreme and continues to impact the skate scene to this day.
134	30	Berlusconi: Condemned to Win	Sam Blair	September 16, 2025	N/A
Three-part examination of how Silvio Berlusconi used his ownership of AC Milan as a launching pad for his controversial political career.
135	31	Boo-Yah: A Portrait of Stuart Scott	Andre Gaines	December 10, 2025	N/A
A look at the life, career, and legacy of late SportsCenter anchor Stuart Scott.
136	32	The Philly Special	Angela Zender & Shannon Furman	February 6, 2026	N/A
Philadelphia Eagles players, coaches, and fans recall the trick play that turned Super Bowl LII toward the Eagles' favor.
137	33	14 Days in Gainesville	Daniel B. Levin	September 15, 2026	N/A
September 1990, and the University of Florida is swept up in both eager anticipation (over former player Steve Spurrier's return to the school as head football coach) and utter fear (over a serial killer's on-campus murder spree).

== Unreleased ==
Down in the Valley, directed by Jason Hehir, explores how Sacramento mayor and former NBA all-star Kevin Johnson played "point guard" in an effort to keep the Kings from relocating to Seattle. The film was originally scheduled to air on October 20, 2015, as part of Volume III, but was delayed to an unspecified date in early October 2015, in light of then-recent articles revisiting allegations of sexual misconduct involving Johnson. It did have a local premiere in Sacramento before its planned broadcast. The film has since been leaked online via YouTube with the director encouraging people to watch it online.

== 30 for 30 Shorts ==
30 for 30 Shorts are short films that have been featured on the 30 for 30 website as well as the now-defunct Grantland.com website; they have also been featured on ESPN or its related networks, either on 30 for 30 compilation shows or on SportsCenter.

No.	Title	Directed by	Original release date	Length (mins)
1	Here Now	Eric Drath	May 15, 2012	8:00
An interview with Pete Rose, Major League Baseball's all-time hits leader, at The Forum Shops at Las Vegas's Caesars Palace, where he signs autographs and memorabilia while store employees act as barkers to lure shoppers into the store.
2	Arnold's Blueprint	Jeff Zimbalist and Michael Zimbalist	September 26, 2012	12:30
A look at how a young Arnold Schwarzenegger's compulsory service in the Austrian Army played a critical role in his path to international bodybuilding fame.
3	Jake	Jonathan Hock	October 25, 2012	11:00
The career of Alfred Slote, an author of sports-oriented children's books (Jake being his personal favorite) whose interest was not so much the games played but the drama that the characters encountered.
4	The Arnold Palmer	Bryan Gordon	November 28, 2012	9:15
An exploration into the history, mystery, and industry surrounding "The Arnold Palmer", the lemonade-and-iced tea beverage created by the same-named golfing legend that has become a fixture of nineteenth hole lore and American leisure.
5	Ali: The Mission	Amani Martin	January 16, 2013	13:45
The efforts of Muhammad Ali to negotiate with Iraqi dictator Saddam Hussein for the release of U.S. civilians taken hostage after Iraq's 1990 invasion of Kuwait.
6	Disdain the Mundane	Nelson George	February 13, 2013	6:00
The style evolution of New York Knicks player and broadcaster Walt Frazier, from his cool-as-ice look in the 1970s to his use of vibrant colors and patterns today.
7	Holy Grail: The T206 Honus Wagner	Nick and Colin Barnicle	February 27, 2013	14:00
The story of the rare and valuable T206 Honus Wagner baseball card—over a century old and valued in the millions of dollars—and the myths and realities that surround it.
8	Silver Reunion	Rory Karpf	March 27, 2013	12:45
The members of the 1972 USA men's Olympic basketball team gather to deliberate 12 Angry Men-style on whether to finally accept or continue to refuse silver medals from the 1972 Summer Olympics, where they controversially lost the gold medal game to the Soviet Union.
9	The Irrelevant Giant	Shaun Silva and Don Lepore	April 17, 2013	11:30
Bill Parcells recalls his rookie year as a head coach with the New York Giants in 1983 and the impact of John Tuggle, a running back the Giants selected with the final pick in that year's NFL draft.
10	Cutthroat	Steven Cantor	May 29, 2013	11:15
The struggles of Clint Malarchuk, the "Cowboy Goalie", from a childhood spent riding horses and suffering from OCD to the grueling recovery period after his carotid artery was severed by an opponent's skate blade, one of the most gruesome injuries in sports history.
11	Tommy and Frank	Richie Keen	July 24, 2013	11:30
An intimate, funny, and compelling take on the unique relationship and shared legacy of Tommy John, the chatty Indiana lefty who won nearly 300 Major League games, and Dr. Frank Jobe, the unassuming L.A. orthopedist who conceived and performed a revolutionary elbow operation on John in 1974.
12	Wilt Chamberlain: Borscht Belt Bellhop	Caroline Laskow and Ian Rosenberg	August 14, 2013	8:45
Rarely seen archival footage and interviews with people who lived and worked with Wilt Chamberlain give a fascinating glimpse into the basketball star's experiences in the Borscht Belt during its heyday.
13	Arthur & Johnnie	Tate Donovan	August 28, 2013	11:30
Johnnie Ashe tells of a personal sacrifice: After finishing a tour of service in the Vietnam War, Johnnie, a U.S. Marine, volunteers to serve another tour in place of his older brother, Army 2nd Lieutenant Arthur Ashe. Johnnie's selfless move allows Arthur to continue his budding tennis career.
14	Collision Course: The Murder of Don Aronow	Billy Corben	September 25, 2013	14:15
The intriguing life and tragic death of businessman Donald Aronow, a prominent name in the world of powerboat racing.
15	The Schedule Makers	Joseph Garner	November 6, 2013	12:25
Using only a computer, a pencil and paper, and cooperation, the husband-and-wife duo of Henry and Holly Stephenson spent almost a quarter-century creating Major League Baseball's season schedule.
16	The Great Imposter	Matt Dilmore	November 20, 2013	9:45
Beginning with stealing a player's warm-up outfit and posing as a player at the 1979 NBA All-Star Game, Barry Bremen begins a playful run fulfilling the average sports fan's ultimate fantasy, sneaking into the fields of play to pose as players, golfers, game officials, and even a cheerleader.
17	Judging Jewell	Adam Hootnick	January 31, 2014	21:45
Security guard Richard Jewell received praise in the aftermath of a bombing during the 1996 Summer Olympics in Atlanta when he helped clear the area and found the bag that contained the pipe bomb. But praise turns into loss of honor when Jewell was wrongfully accused of planting the bomb in the ensuing investigation.
18	The Deal	Nick and Colin Barnicle	February 12, 2014	22:30
The battle between the Boston Red Sox and the New York Yankees to trade for Alex Rodriguez during the 2003–2004 baseball offseason.
19	Untucked	Danny Pudi	March 12, 2014	14:45
Player Bo Ellis designs a rebellious, nonconformist jersey that would exemplify the Al McGuire-era Marquette men's basketball team.
20	From Harlem With Love	Matt Ogens	April 23, 2014	11:45
How the Harlem Globetrotters became unlikely ambassadors during the Cold War when they played a series of games in Moscow in 1959.
21	Posterized	Andrew Jenks	May 21, 2014	13:00
A profile of Shawn Bradley, a 7-foot-6 center who spent the majority of his NBA career on the wrong end of epic dunks (the kind usually found on posters), and how he went from a bust on the basketball court to a superstar off of it.
22	MECCA: The Floor That Made Milwaukee Famous	Chris James Thompson	June 11, 2014	14:00
The story behind the iconic, multicolored basketball court Robert Indiana designed for the MECCA Arena, home to the Milwaukee Bucks and Marquette Warriors until 1988, and how one Bucks fan used his family's credit card to rescue the floor from the scrap heap.
23	The High Five	Michael Jacobs	July 23, 2014	10:15
When L.A. Dodger Dusty Baker hit his 30th home run of the 1977 season, the first man to greet him at home plate was his friend and teammate, rookie Glenn Burke. Overcome with happiness, Burke did the first thing that came to mind—he put his hand straight in the air and had Baker slap it, thus in fact creating the high five gesture.
24	Kid Danny	Andrew Cohn	August 13, 2014	17:45
A team from The Bronx makes it to the 2001 Little League World Series, only to be disqualified when pitcher Danny Almonte is revealed to be two years too old to play in Little League.
25	Fields of Fear	Alex Gibney	September 16, 2014	15:30
A profile of the mental side of sports focuses on Mackey Sasser, a talented catcher who suddenly couldn't perform the routine task of throwing the ball back to the pitcher, and how confronting boyhood traumas helped in his mental recovery.
26	The Great Trade Robbery	Stu Zicherman	October 7, 2014 (Note: The Great Trade Robbery premiered on ESPN on October 7, 2014 (the same night as Playing for the Mob) before its release online the next day.)	12:00
Former Dallas Cowboys head coach Jimmy Johnson recalls the team's October 1989 trade of Herschel Walker to the Minnesota Vikings, as well as the roster maneuvers involving the players the Cowboys received in return that laid the foundations for the team's success in the 1990s.
27	Our Tough Guy	Molly Schiot	November 12, 2014	10:30
A look inside the mindset of legendary Boston Bruins enforcer John Wensink, who endeared himself to fans when he infamously challenged the entire Minnesota North Stars bench to a fight, and the journey his life took following his playing career.
28	Robbed	Eric Drath	December 3, 2014	16:30
A look at the 1976 Muhammad Ali/Ken Norton fight at Yankee Stadium. The bout's controversial decision is only part of the story, as gang activity and theft in the wake of an NYPD strike was happening right outside the stadium's gates.
29	Student/Athlete	Ken Jeong	January 7, 2015	13:15
Growing up in Hawaii, Reggie Ho always thought he would follow his father's footsteps into medicine, yet he becomes a crucial contributor to Notre Dame's undefeated 1988 season as a walk-on player.
30	The Sweat Solution	David Beilinson and Neil Amdur	January 21, 2015	16:45
Dr. Robert Cade, a renowned kidney specialist at the University of Florida, leads a research team that develops a drink designed to help replenish body fluids lost by the school's football team – a "magic elixir" that would later be called Gatorade.
31	An Immortal Man	Josh Koury and Myles Kane	February 25, 2015	15:00
A look at the issue of cryogenically preserving Ted Williams's body.
32	Wrestling the Curse	Amanda Spain	February 27, 2015	17:00
Kevin Von Erich was part of a legendary wrestling family (he and fellow brothers David, Mike, Chris, and Kerry). The only surviving brother (the other four were lost to drug addiction or suicide), Kevin now finds peace living off the grid in a remote part of Hawaii.
33	The Billion Dollar Game	Nick Guthe	March 18, 2015	13:45
A recollection of how the Princeton Tigers, a heavy underdog, nearly defeated top-seeded Georgetown in the first round of the 1989 NCAA tournament, a game that would forever change March Madness.
34	Unhittable: Sidd Finch and the Tibetan Fastball	Peter Sillen	April 1, 2015	22:31
For Sports Illustrated's April 1, 1985, issue, George Plimpton profiled Sidd Finch, a highly eccentric New York Mets prospect who could throw a fastball at an unheard-of 168 mph... and who was a product of Plimpton's imagination. On the 30th anniversary of the April Fools hoax, the surviving people responsible are profiled, including the Illinois middle-school teacher who posed as Finch for SI.
35	The Anti-Mascot	Colin Hanks	May 20, 2015	12:00
Aiming to satirize the loveable team mascot craze of the late 1970s and early 1980s, the 1984 San Francisco Giants introduce an "anti-mascot" named "Crazy Crab". With fans encouraged to take the "anti-" literally, Crazy Crab and the actor playing him, Wayne Doba, endure verbal and physical abuse over the course of the Giants' last-place season.
36	Ted Turner's Greatest Race	Gary Jobson	June 3, 2015	14:15
Already a proven broadcasting and sports executive, as well as an America's Cup-winning yachtsman, Ted Turner enters and skippers Tenacious in the 1979 Fastnet yachting race. Here, Turner and Tenacious's crew recall the harrowing race, an event marred by a deadly storm in the Celtic Sea.
37	Spyball	Christina Burchard and Daniel Newman	July 8, 2015	18:00
The story of Moe Berg, a 15-year veteran of Major League Baseball who went on to become a World War II spy for the United States.
38	Brave In the Attempt	Fritz Mitchell	July 28, 2015	23:45
How seeing the treatment of her intellectually disabled sister propelled Eunice Kennedy Shriver to create the Special Olympics.
39	Delaney	Grant Curtis	August 19, 2015	19:45
A profile of Kansas City Chiefs star Joe Delaney, whose reputation for helping others lasted until his drowning death in 1983, when he attempted to save the lives of three boys in a Louisiana pond (though he himself could not swim).
40	First Pitch	Angus Wall	September 11, 2015	23:30
A look at President George W. Bush's ceremonial first pitch at New York's Yankee Stadium prior to Game 3 of the 2001 World Series, just seven weeks after the September 11 attacks in the city.
41	The Pittsburgh Drug Trials	Michael Jacobs	September 28, 2015	22:36
Though the 1979 Pirates thrilled Pittsburgh with a World Series win, many of their stars succumbed to the lure of cocaine, leading to baseball's first major drug scandal.
42	#BringBackSungWoo	Josh Swade and Josh Shelov	October 7, 2015	22:30
A mid-season visit to Kansas City by South Korean native and avid Royals fan Lee Sung-woo is followed by a Royals' surge to the 2014 playoffs. With the team in the World Series, an attempt is made by two Royals fans to bring their "good-luck charm" from Seoul back to KC.
43	Every Day	Gabe Spitzer	October 28, 2015	11:30
The story of Joy Johnson, who took up running at age 59 after raising four children and went on to participate in 25 New York City Marathons.
44	Chattanooga Strong	Rebecca Gitlitz	November 9, 2015	9:44
The story behind the Chattanooga Heroes Fund, started by University of Tennessee alum Peyton Manning to benefit the families of the service members and police officers who were killed or wounded in a July 2015 shooting incident in Chattanooga.
45	Tose: The Movie	Mike Tollin	November 11, 2015	15:30
A look at the life and legacy of late Philadelphia Eagles owner Leonard Tose.
46	Thicker Than Water	Jennifer Arnold	December 1, 2015	14:15
How diver Greg Louganis dealt with two different pressures surrounding him at the 1988 Olympics—his attempt to defend his double gold medal performance from 1984 and the discovery of his HIV-positive status prior to the Games.
47	Friedman's Shoes	Danny Lee	February 9, 2016	12:00
The story of Friedman's, an Atlanta shoe store that specialized in really big (think size 22), really expensive shoes for the six-foot-something athlete.
48	Slick, Nancy, and the Telethon	Michael Husain	February 16, 2016	14:30
The story of how the Indiana Pacers avoided financial ruin by holding a telethon in the summer of 1977.
49	The Bad Boy of Bowling	Bryan Storkel	February 23, 2016	19:00
A look at the life of Pete Weber, the self-declared "bad boy of bowling" and the sport's first rock star.
50	I Am Yup'ik	Daniele Anastasion and Nathan Golon	March 1, 2016	17:15
A 16-year-old Yup'ik Eskimo leaves his tiny village and travels across the frozen tundra to compete in an all-Yup'ik basketball tournament and bring pride to his village.
51	No Kin to Me	Marc Kinderman	March 8, 2016	13:45
The last consolation game in the NCAA tournament, held in 1981 between LSU and Virginia, was overshadowed by the assassination attempt on President Ronald Reagan earlier that day, and also by a postgame comment about Reagan by LSU star Rudy Macklin that haunted him for years.
52	Tiger Hood	Christopher André Marks	April 12, 2016	7:15
When Patrick Q. F. Barr found a discarded golf club in the trash, he decided to save it and play street golf in New York City using paper milk cartons stuffed with newspaper, earning him the nickname, "Tiger Hood".
53	When The King Held Court	Palmer Holton	April 19, 2016	8:30
How Elvis Presley became a racquetball enthusiast in the final years of his life, going so far as to build a court at his mansion and proposing a chain of racquetball centers.
54	Gonzo @ The Derby	Michael D. Ratner	May 3, 2016	13:00
The lasting legacy of the 1970 Kentucky Derby has nothing to do with the winner, Dust Commander. Its true impact came from the assignment that Scanlan's Monthly gave to a 32-year-old writer from Louisville named Hunter S. Thompson.
55	A. C. Green: Iron Virgin	Isaac Feder	May 10, 2016	8:30
While A.C. Green is well-known for his basketball talents (winning 3 NBA titles with the "Showtime"-era Lakers and playing in a league-record 1,192 consecutive games), he is also known for abiding by his Christian beliefs and remaining celibate throughout his entire NBA career.
56	The Shining Star of Losers Everywhere	Mickey Duzyj	May 17, 2016	18:30
How Japanese thoroughbred Haru Urara, who never won a race in her career, became a symbol of hope to her country and saved her home racetrack from financial ruin.
57	We Are	Jay Bulger and Joshua Shelov	May 24, 2016	11:00
A look back at the aftermath of the Penn State child sex abuse scandal, focusing specifically on the removal of Joe Paterno's statue from the campus and the design of its replacement.
58	Eternal Princess	Katie Holmes	May 24, 2016	17:45
The successes and struggles of Nadia Comăneci, from being an accomplished (and perfect-score) Romanian gymnast to life as a United States citizen.
59	The Guerrilla Fighter	Gaspar González	July 27, 2016	17:30
The story of Alexis Argüello, legendary in Nicaragua as both a political figure and one of the greatest boxers of the 20th century.
60	What the Hell Happened to Jai Alai	Ryan Suffern	August 2, 2016	15:00
How jai alai went from drawing crowds of thousands in Miami in the 1970s and 1980s to being fortunate to draw 100 to a match today.
61	The Throwback	Erin Leyden	December 3, 2016	11:00
A look back at the college career of Gordie Lockbaum, who became a two-time Heisman Trophy finalist in the 1980s at Division I-AA Holy Cross as a figurative throwback to an earlier era of football, sometimes participating in more than 80% of his team's plays (offense and defense) in a given game.
62	The Counterfeiter	Brian Biegel	May 17, 2017	22:30
The story of Greg Marino, master forger and target of a 1990s FBI investigation known as Operation Bullpen.
63	Strike Team	Willie Ebersol	September 12, 2017	24:30
How a team of U.S. Marshals lured more than 100 fugitives to arrest through an offer of free Washington Redskins game tickets.
64	24 Strong	Unknown	September 28, 2017	24:00
The legacy of Tennessee high school football player Zaevion Dobson, who sacrificed his life while shielding three girls from a drive-by shooting.
65	The Amazing Adventures of Wally and The Worm	Colin Hanks	December 15, 2017	15:30
Wally Blasé is assigned to oversee Chicago Bull Dennis Rodman's knee rehab. What followed was 10 days of jet-setting, brushes with celebrity, a lifelong friendship between Blasé and Rodman – and the Bulls' 5th NBA title.
66	Locked In	Alison Ellwood	August 3, 2018	38:00
The story of Victoria Arlen, who was endowed with both athletic talent and a loving family until being "locked" into a vegetative state and unable to communicate. With the help of family and therapy, Victoria would come out of her "prison" to become a medal-winning swimmer at the 2012 Paralympics and, after recovering the use of her legs, a contestant on Dancing with the Stars.
67	Sonic Break	Stevan Riley	September 23, 2018	21:45
The anxiety experienced by Felix Baumgartner during the lead-up to his ultimately successful attempt to become the first human to break the sound barrier without the benefit of engine power.
68	Mack Wrestles	Taylor Hess and Erin Sanger	September 22, 2019	25:45
The story of Mack Beggs and his desire to compete in boys' wrestling in Texas, even though state interscholastic officials, who recognized him as female (Beggs is a trans male), forced him to compete in girls' competitions.
69	Subject to Review	Theo Anthony	December 22, 2019	36:45
A look at the history, development, and implementation of the photographic computer-modeled review system of tennis line calls, and the intersection of technology and our perceptions of the physical world.
70	Deerfoot of the Diamond	Lance Edmands	September 27, 2022	30:30
A look at the issues surrounding the Cleveland baseball team's name change from Indians to "Guardians" as well as the rise and fall of the Penobscot player who inspired the earlier derogatory nickname, Louis Sockalexis.
TBA	The Other Side	Vanessa Roth	TBA	N/A
Common goals of teamwork and dedication to a shared purpose unite a youth soccer team, composed of 9 children each from Palestine and Israel, many of whom come face-to-face with the other nationality for the first time in their lives.

== Films and television ==
On a number of occasions, the 30 for 30 format has been used to promote sports films and television:

=== Daniel LaRusso vs. Johnny Lawrence ===
On April 17, 2019, YouTube Premium released a 30 for 30 featurette for the second season of its web-based series, Cobra Kai, a comedic reboot of The Karate Kid featuring the main cast members and select ESPN personalities analyzing the 1984 match between Daniel LaRusso and Johnny Lawrence. It was nominated for a Clio Award.

=== The Legend of the Flying V ===
On March 21, 2021, ahead of the premiere of The Mighty Ducks: Game Changers, Disney+ and ESPN collaborated on a promotional featurette in partnership with Cheerios on the Minnesota Pee-Wee hockey state championship game between the original Ducks and the Hawks, shown in the original Mighty Ducks film from 1992. Among those who provide commentary are Fulton Reed (Elden Henson), Lester Averman (Matt Doherty) and Connie Moreau (Marguerite Moreau) from the original Ducks – who all also went on to appear in Game Changers – Sofi Hanson-Bhatt (Swayam Bhatia) and Evan Morrow (Brady Noon) from Game Changers protagonist team the Don't Bothers, United States women's hockey forward and Olympic gold medalist Meghan Duggan and ESPN hockey analysts and SportsCenter anchors Linda Cohn, John Buccigross and Steve Levy.

== 30 for 30: Soccer Stories ==
On January 11, 2014, it was announced that a soccer-only 30 for 30 series, featuring two-feature-length films and six 30-minute films, would be aired in April 2014, featuring "compelling narratives from around the international soccer landscape". Additionally, a 10-part vignette series, titled Coraçao, aired during ESPN's 2014 FIFA World Cup coverage and examined the history and culture of host country Brazil.

No.	Title	Directed by	Original release date	US viewers (millions)
1	Hillsborough	Daniel Gordon	April 15, 2014 (Note: Hillsborough was an ESPN–BBC co-production. It could not be aired in the UK until 2016 because an official inquiry into the disaster was ongoing at the time of its first airing in the U.S. After the inquest verdict was announced, footage from the inquest and final verdict would be added to the film.)	0.527
A look at the April 15, 1989 tragedy at Hillsborough Stadium in Sheffield, England, where overcrowding in the stadium's standing-room-only areas led to a crushing stampede that killed 96 people and injured 766. (Note: One of the injured, who had suffered a traumatic brain injury that left him permanently incapacitated, died in 2021 and was officially listed as the 97th fatality from the disaster.) The film examines the ongoing efforts of victims' families to seek exoneration of their loved ones, who were blamed in part by local authorities in an attempt to conceal police and security inadequacies. (2 hours in length)
2	Maradona '86	Sam Blair	April 22, 2014	< 0.033
A look at Diego Maradona's spectacular individual performance during the 1986 FIFA World Cup. (30 minutes in length)
3	The Opposition	Ezra Edelman and Jeffrey Plunkett	April 22, 2014	< 0.033
Chile hosts a decisive World Cup qualifier at Santiago's National Stadium just weeks after it had been transformed into a concentration camp and killing field for opponents of Augusto Pinochet (who had just gained power in a military coup). Though FIFA investigates the matter, the game goes on, with the Chilean team winning in a walkover after their opponents from the Soviet Union boycott in protest over the stadium's use. (30 minutes in length)
4	Ceasefire Massacre	Alex Gibney and Trevor Birney	April 29, 2014	< 0.038
June 18, 1994, and fans of Ireland's national team are euphoric over their team's World Cup opener against Italy at Giants Stadium. Joy turns to horror, however, at a bar in Loughinisland, Northern Ireland, where a Protestant terror group kills six men who were watching the game. The tragedy is a low point in the Northern Ireland conflict, as well as a turning point, as it would ultimately contribute to paramilitaries on both sides calling ceasefires just weeks later. (30 minutes in length)
5	The Myth of Garrincha	Marcos Horacio Azevedo	April 29, 2014	< 0.038
Examining the legend of Mané Garrincha, who overcame bent legs to lead Brazil to two World Cup wins through his amusing style of play, and the efforts of his family and fans to give him a proper burial in Rio de Janeiro after his death in 1983. The Myth of Garrincha originally went by the title Garrincha: Crippled Angel during production. (30 minutes in length)
6	Mysteries of the Rimet Trophy	Brett Ratner	May 6, 2014	< 0.031
The Jules Rimet Trophy, awarded to the World Cup winners from 1930 to 1970, is a prize shrouded in mystery, as the whereabouts of the original trophy is unknown. This film focuses on the trophy's first brush with crime—a Nazi plan to steal the Rimet Trophy from Italy during World War II—and Ottorino Barassi, an Italian soccer official who attempted to protect the valued prize. (30 minutes in length)
7	Barbosa: The Man Who Made All of Brazil Cry	Loch Phillipps	May 6, 2014	< 0.031
How Brazilian goalkeeper Moacir Barbosa went from national hero to pariah after allowing Uruguay's cup-winning goal in the 1950 World Cup. (30 minutes in length)
8	White, Blue and White	Camilo Antolini	July 1, 2014	N/A
After leading their national team to victory in the 1978 FIFA World Cup, Argentines Ossie Ardiles and Ricky Villa join Tottenham Hotspur, becoming cult heroes in England after leading Spurs to the 1981 FA Cup Final. Things radically change, however, when a conflicted Ardiles leaves Spurs and returns to Buenos Aires after Argentine troops descend on the British-ruled Falkland Islands, asserting sovereignty over the territory and resulting in the Falklands War.

== Vignettes ==
No.	Title	Directed by	Original release date
1	Coraçao	Jonathan Hock	TBA
A 10-part vignette series exploring the music, dance and history of Brazil, revealing what lies behind Brazil's legend (something most Americans know little about) and exploring how soccer is truly the expression of the soul of its people.

== 30 for 30 Podcasts ==
On September 7, 2016, it was announced that ESPN Films and ESPN Audio would produce 30 for 30 Podcasts, reporting on new sports stories using a narrative podcasting approach. The podcast was launched in June 2017, with the first season produced and hosted by Jody Avirgan and a team of in-house producers. Future season have featured both single-episode and serialized, season-long subject matter, produced "in collaboration with outside reporters, documentarians, and ESPN talent." The 30 for 30 theme music was re-worked for the podcast series by Hrishikesh Hirway, who is a musician, composer and the host of the Song Exploder podcast.

=== Season 1 ===
The first season was released in mid-2017 and was produced and hosted by Jody Avirgan and a team of in-house producers. It featured the following episodes:

No. overall	No. in series	Title	Length (mins.)	Original release date
1	1	The Trials of Dan and Dave	52:00	June 27, 2017
The stories of Dan O'Brien and Dave Johnson, American decathletes who competed for a spot in the 1992 Summer Olympics and who were subjects of a $25 million Reebok ad campaign.
2	2	Yankees Suck	49:00	July 4, 2017
How a vulgar chant and a bootleg t-shirt became a significant part of the Red Sox–Yankees rivalry.
3	3	On the Ice	42:00	July 11, 2017
A look at the first all-women expedition to the North Pole in 1997.
4	4	A Queen of Sorts	46:00	July 18, 2017
How Phil Ivey pulled off an elaborate baccarat scheme in 2012 that won him over $20 million (and landed him in court) — with help from a secretive mastermind who crafted the scheme to get revenge.
5	5	The Fighter Inside	46:00	July 25, 2017
With a warden's assistance, professional boxer James Scott rises through the sport's ranks while serving a prison term for a 1975 armed robbery.

=== Season 2 ===
Season two launched in November 2017 and features the following episodes:

No. overall	No. in series	Title	Length (mins.)	Original release date
6	1	Hoodies Up	31:00	November 14, 2017
Five weeks after the shooting death of Trayvon Martin, the Miami Heat pose in hoodies for a photo that spurs conversations about gun violence and race, as well as a new era of athlete activism.
7	2	No Rules: The Birth of UFC	53:00	November 21, 2017
A look at Art Davie and Rorion Gracie's founding of the Ultimate Fighting Championship, as well as the mixed martial arts organization's first championship event.
8	3	The Lights of Wrigleyville	49:00	November 28, 2017
How the fight to install lights at Wrigley Field pitted residents in the ballpark's neighborhood against the Chicago Cubs' corporate owners.
9	4	Madden's Game	38:00	December 5, 2017
Seeing video games as a football teaching tool, John Madden teams with Electronic Arts on what would become an enduring name in the gaming and sports industries, Madden NFL.
10	5	Project Space Jump	TBD	TBD
A look at Felix Baumgartner's record-breaking 2012 free fall from the edge of space and the technical and psychological problems that surrounded it.

=== Season 3: Bikram ===
Season three, subtitled Bikram, consists of five episodes that released in May 2018. Reported and produced by Julia Lowrie Henderson, it explores the life of Bikram Choudhury, who has been lauded as an innovator and guru of yoga but has also had a history of dark behavior, including bankruptcy, and sexual assault and harassment allegations.

No. overall	No. in series	Title	Length (mins.)	Original release date
11	1	Bikram Part 1: Arrival	41:00	May 22, 2018
After arriving in Los Angeles in the 1970s, Bikram Choudhury establishes the foundation for his yoga empire through his rags-to-riches origin story and connections with the rich and famous.
12	2	Bikram Part 2: Process	37:00	May 22, 2018
Bikram's hot yoga training puts pupils through intense suffering and begins to reveal his complex character.
13	3	Bikram Part 3: Power	37:00	May 22, 2018
A review of Bikram's hardball approach to claiming ownership over his brand of yoga, as well as a separation of truths from falsehoods in his life story.
14	4	Bikram Part 4: Truth	45:00	May 22, 2018
As Bikram's darkest behaviors begin to emerge, the community devoted to his yoga is forced to face the truth about its leader.
15	5	Bikram Part 5: Reckoning	33:00	May 22, 2018
Members of the Bikram yoga community wrestle with the guru's reputation and their own complicity in his behavior.

=== Season 4 ===
Season Four launched in October 2018 and features the following episodes:

No. overall	No. in series	Title	Length (mins.)	Original release date
16	1	Juiced	41:45	October 16, 2018
After his exit from baseball, a vengeful Jose Canseco writes a tell-all memoir about fellow players' use of steroids – an exposé that leads to a congressional hearing.
17	2	All In: Sparking the Poker Boom	49:41	October 23, 2018
How the 2003 World Series of Poker overcame organizational and competition odds and helped generate an increased interest in the game.
18	3	Six Who Sat	42:29	October 30, 2018
Two iconic protests (at the 1968 Boston Marathon and the 1972 New York City Marathon) generate a movement that would see women competing with men in long-distance running events.
19	4	The Loophole	43:15	November 6, 2018
How Hideo Nomo successfully overcame legal and cultural barriers to play in Major League Baseball.
20	5	Rickey Won't Quit	41:27	November 13, 2018
Still yearning to continue his baseball playing career at 46 and not seeing offers from MLB, former Oakland Athletics legend Rickey Henderson instead joins an independent league.
21	6	Back Pass	49:42	May 12, 2019
Members of the 1999 United States women's national soccer team use their newfound fame to help launch the first women's pro soccer league, the WUSA, but management tensions jeopardize the venture.

=== Season 5: The Sterling Affairs ===
The fifth season, subtitled The Sterling Affairs and released in August 2019, explored former Los Angeles Clippers owner Donald Sterling and his subsequent ban for life by commissioner Adam Silver from the National Basketball Association after the exposure of his racist comments. Ramona Shelburne served as reporter and host for the season, which was produced in part with ESPN's The Undefeated website.

No. overall	No. in series	Title	Length (mins.)	Original release date
22	1	The Sterling Affairs Part 1: That Tape	36:00	August 20, 2019
The season begins with what would spark Donald Sterling's downfall: Audio, secretly recorded by his mistress and leaked to the media, in which he expresses racist comments.
23	2	The Sterling Affairs Part 2: The Opposite of Showtime	49:00	August 20, 2019
Jerry Buss relies on Sterling's real estate savvy to purchase the Lakers. It helps propel that team to "Showtime" success but leaves Sterling, owner of the floundering Clippers, envious.
24	3	The Sterling Affairs Part 3: Property	49:50	August 20, 2019
Donald and Shelly Sterling escape poverty to build an LA real estate and basketball empire, but it allows Donald to engage, without consequence, in womanizing and housing discrimination.
25	4	The Sterling Affairs Part 4: Fallout	42:52	August 20, 2019
The release of the audio tape results in an exercising of power by NBA players – and leads Adam Silver, in his first major test as NBA commissioner, to banish Sterling from the league.
26	5	The Sterling Affairs Part 5: Not Fit	48:49	August 20, 2019
After the NBA banishes Donald Sterling, wife Shelly makes legal maneuvers to declare him mentally unfit, seize control of the Clippers, and sell the franchise.

=== Season 6 ===
Season six released in November and December 2019, include the following episodes:

No. overall	No. in series	Title	Length (mins.)	Original release date
27	1	The Spy Who Signed Me	45:12	November 12, 2019
American-born WNBA stars Diana Taurasi and Sue Bird enjoy the riches of playing women's pro basketball in Russia, but are forced to reckon with the dark past of the team owner who ensured their lavish life, Shabtai Kalmanovich.
28	2	Out of the Woods	45:14	November 19, 2019
Biathlete Kari Swenson recalls her July 1984 kidnapping and her mental and physical recovery process to return to competition.
29	3	The Fall of the Condor	47:59	November 26, 2019
How captain and star goalie Roberto Rojas drove his Chilean national soccer team to be "more bandits than the bandits," especially when up against rival Brazil, in the qualifying process for the 1990 FIFA World Cup. The events of El Maracanazo are covered.
30	4	Cursed and Blessed	45:32	December 3, 2019
The history of the Superdome, from the stadium's cursed reputation before and during Hurricane Katrina to its status as the symbol of a rebuilding New Orleans.

=== Season 7: Heavy Medals ===
Season seven features the seven-part miniseries Heavy Medals, focusing on women's gymnastics coaches Béla & Márta Karolyi and their controversial training methods. All seven episodes of the season were released on July 14, 2020, and are reported by Bonnie D. Ford and Alyssa Roenigk.

No. overall	No. in series	Title	Length (mins.)	Original release date
31	1	Heavy Medals Part 1: Made in Romania	41:35	July 14, 2020
After turning fellow Romanian Nadia Comaneci into a global symbol of gymnastic excellence, Béla & Márta Karolyi defect to the U.S. in a desire to seek greater ambitions.
32	2	Heavy Medals Part 2: American Hustle	44:28	July 14, 2020
After Mary Lou Retton gains Nadia-like Olympic perfection, she and the Karolyis become household names, prompting Béla to harness that success for his own cause.
33	3	Heavy Medals Part 3: The Béla Show	34:58	July 14, 2020
After his champion fails at the 1992 Olympics, Béla steps away from the spotlight – but becomes the focus of abuse allegations.
34	4	Heavy Medals Part 4: Home Games	33:55	July 14, 2020
The talent of Dominique Moceanu pulls the Karolyis back into coaching, but it's long-overshadowed veteran Kerri Strug who brings them new Olympic success.
35	5	Heavy Medals Part 5: The Karolyi Way	38:49	July 14, 2020
With the 2000 Olympics in sight and its team languishing in mediocrity, USA Gymnastics turns to Béla to oversee the training and team selection process.
36	6	Heavy Medals Part 6: The Rise of Martha	41:58	July 14, 2020
Márta emerges from under her husband's shadow to become a gymnastics force in her own right, but her approach leads to a discarding of injured athletes – and a culture of silence.
37	7	Heavy Medals Part 7: The Unraveling	50:56	July 14, 2020
As Márta's own coaching success is established, scandal rocks the gymnastics world and calls the Karolyis' demanding legacy into question.
