= ReMastered: The Miami Showband Massacre =

2019 documentary film

- Film poster
- Directed by: Stuart Sender
- Written by: Jeff Zimbalist; Michael Zimbalist
- Starring: Stephen Travers; Bertie Ahern; Alan Brecknell
- Distributed by: Netflix
- Release date: March 22, 2019
- Running time: 71 minutes
- Country: United States
- Language: English

ReMastered: The Miami Showband Massacre is a 2019 documentary film about the Miami Showband killings, an attack on the cabaret band The Miami Showband on 31 July 1975.

== Premise ==
The documentary explores the Miami Showband killings, an attack on The Miami Showband on 31 July 1975 by the loyalist paramilitary group Ulster Volunteer Force (UVF). The Miami Showband were at the time one of Ireland's most popular cabaret bands, and in the attack five people were killed, including three members of the band.

== Cast ==
- Stephen Travers
- Bertie Ahern
- Alan Brecknell
- Anne Cadwallader
- Fred Holroyd
- Chris Hudson
- Winston Irvine
- Des Lee
- Ken Livingstone
- Michael Mates
- Ray Millar
- Raymond White
- The Beatles
- Tony Blair
- Tony Geraghty
