= The Two Escobars (film) =

American TV documentary

- Written by: Nick Sprague, Jeff Zimbalist, Michael Zimbalist
- Directed by: Jeff Zimbalist, Michael Zimbalist
- Theme music composer: Ion Furjanic
- Country of origin: United States
- Original languages: English; Interviews and archival footage in Spanish

Production
- Executive producers: Keith Clinkscales; John Dahl; Joan Lynch; Connor Schell; John Skipper; Bill Simmons; John Walsh
- Producers: Jeff Zimbalist, Michael Zimbalist
- Cinematography: Jeff Zimbalist
- Editors: Jeff Zimbalist, Greg O'Toole
- Running time: 1 hour 43 minutes

Original release
- Network: ESPN
- Release: June 22, 2010

The Two Escobars is a 2010 sports documentary film written and directed by Jeff and Michael Zimbalist. It was co-produced by ESPN and All Rise Films for ESPN's 30 for 30 series. It premiered at the Tribeca Film Festival in April, 2010 and was released on June 22, 2010 on ESPN.

The documentary chronicles the intertwining of Colombian football, the drug trade, and the lives of two Colombians from the late 1980s and early 1990s: the infamous drug lord Pablo Escobar, and the unrelated captain of the national football team, Andrés Escobar, who was murdered after scoring an accidental own goal in a match at the 1994 World Cup.

The release date of June 22, 2010 was the 16th anniversary date of Andrés Escobar's own goal, and coincided with the beginning of the 2010 World Cup.

== Background ==
Directors and brothers Michael and Jeff Zimbalist were in Colombia in 2009, working on an unrelated documentary, when they were approached by ESPN films, who had just launched the 30 for 30 Series. The concept of the series was to produce 30 documentary films by 30 filmmakers, each focusing on an event demonstrating the interaction between sports and society over the last 30 years. The directors had already gained some fame from their 2005 documentary Favela Rising. Jeff Zimbalist noted that their father, an economist, had previously lived and worked in Latin America for many years, and both of them knew the region from doing social service programs in summer sessions there, then both having worked in various countries in Latin America after finishing college. They connected with a friend, Nick Sprague, who had been a former soccer player and longtime fan of the Colombian National Team, and the concept of The Two Escobars was formed. He said they had "fallen in love" with the Colombian people even before The Two Escobars.

The directors said that they soon discovered that in order to tell the story, they had to learn the complexities of “narco-soccer”: the relationship between wealthy drug lords and the soccer teams they supported. They also had to portray the conflicted feelings Colombians had about it, in that half the country saw Pablo Escobar as a hero who helped the poor, while others saw him as a sociopathic murderer, who destabilized every aspect of Colombian society.

Jeff Zimbalist said they conducted 43 interviews, most of which were one to two hours in length. Many of the people interviewed had never before spoken about the difficult and often painful issues involved, and some had never filmed an interview before. Interview subjects included football players and coaches, friends and family members of the two Escobars, judges and government officials, including the former President of Colombia, U.S. DEA officials, and violent cartel members serving sentences for murder.

Zimbalist said that when they finished their first cut of the film, it was roughly 100 minutes, much longer than the typical 30 for 30 film. "We feared ESPN wouldn't get behind a 100 minute, subtitled, Spanish language documentary that was arguably more about politics and national identity than it was about sports, not to mention that the sport was soccer. To our surprise, ESPN loved it and approved a primetime airing of the full 100 minute cut."

== Primary interview subjects ==
In order of appearance

- María Ester Escobar, Andrés Escobar's sister
- Francisco Maturana, Head Coach, Nacional & Colombia
- Alexis García, Midfielder
- Jaime Gaviria Gómez, Pablo Escobar's cousin
- Jhon Jairo Velásquez ("Popeye"), Medellín Cartel member
- Fernando Rodríguez Mondragón, Cali Cartel member
- Eduardo Rojo, Andrés Escobar's friend
- Leonel Álvarez, Defensive Midfielder
- Luz María Escobar, Pablo Escobar's sister
- Luis Fernando Herrera ("Chonto"), Defender
- Tom Cash, U.S. DEA
- Rubén Darío Pinilla, Superior Court Judge
- César Gaviria, President of Colombia, 1990-1994
- Pamela Cascardo, Andrés Escobar's fiancée
- Gabriel Jaime Gómez ("Barrabas"), Midfielder
- Juan José Bellini, President, Colombian Soccer Federation, 1992-1995
- Carlos Valderrama ("Pibe"), Midfielder
- Faustino Asprilla, Striker
- Adolfo Valencia, Striker
- César Mauricio Velásquez, Journalist
- Fernando Brito, Head of Intelligence for President Gaviria
- Óscar Córdoba, Goalkeeper
- Mauricio Serna, Midfielder

== Synopsis ==
Portrayed through interviews and archival footage, the film relates the rise of Pablo Escobar in the 1980s as one of the most powerful drug kingpins of all-time, running a cartel that monopolized cocaine trade into the US and Europe. Escobar amassed enormous wealth, and came to be seen by many in Colombia as a kind of "Robin Hood", who actively engaged in philanthropy, building local football fields, schools, health clinics, and homes, particularly in the poor areas of his home city of Medellín. Through Escobar and others, drug money filtered into nearly every aspect of Colombian society. "The drug trade was an octopus, it touched everything," said one interviewee. Himself an avid football fan, Escobar figured heavily in Colombian football, in part as a vehicle for money laundering, but in part because he genuinely loved the game. Over time Colombia improved their national football team by being able to hire and keep better coaches and players.

In the same period, the late 1980s, the unrelated Andrés Escobar rose to prominence as one of the country's best defensive players. He was known for his clean style of play and calmness, his coach Francisco Maturana stating, "He personified form and integrity." He was given the nickname "El Caballero del Fútbol" ("The Gentleman of Football"), and played on the national team in the 1990 and 1994 World Cups.

Pablo Escobar engaged widely in bribery and murder, and after he had several prominent politicians killed, the Colombian government eventually cracked down on the drug trade and his operations. Escobar eventually agreed to surrender himself in 1991 under the condition that he reside in a personal prison known as La Catedral overlooking Medellín. The prison had been built to Escobar's specifications and amounted to a luxury chalet, designed more to keep him safe from enemies than as a prison, and was complete with a football pitch, a bar, and other amenities. As Escobar continued to run his drug trade from the facility, in 1992 the government decided to move him into a traditional prison, at which point Escobar escaped and went on the run.

The hunt for Pablo Escobar, aided by the U.S. DEA and rival cartels, unleashed further violence. Eventually Escobar's own people turned against him, and in December, 1993 he was killed in a shootout with Colombian special forces in Medellín. His death was mourned by many of the city's poor people.

While this was happening in 1993, the Colombian national team qualified for the 1994 World Cup, and in their final qualifying match beat Argentina 5-0, the worst defeat in the Argentinian team's history. The Colombian team arrived in Los Angeles for the 1994 World Cup as favorites to win the championship. According to the film, the team and country were eager to show through football that Colombia represented more than drug violence.

However, in their first game they unexpectedly lost to Romania. Their second game was against the host United States team, a match they were also expected to win, as they had previously played a number of friendlies against the US and won them all. Just hours before the game started however, the coach and players all received death threats from unknown persons, telling them that if midfielder Barrabas Gómez played, the entire team would be killed. Coach Maturana made the decision to pull Gómez, and the team was shaken and on edge for the game.

Despite an aggressive strategy, the Colombians struggled to score. In the 35th minute, Andrés Escobar, stretching to block a shot by American John Harkes, accidentally deflected the ball into the Colombian net, scoring an own goal, the only one of his career. The Americans won the game 2-1, which led to Colombia eventually being eliminated from the tournament.

The country was deeply disappointed with the outcome. On returning to Colombia, Andrés Escobar wrote a piece for the newspaper El Tiempo, sharing his disappointment and calling for healing. Just days after this however, he was shot to death in a parking lot outside a bar in Medellín, in apparent retaliation for the own goal.

His final words in the newspaper piece were, "Let us please maintain respect...We'll see each other again soon, because life does not end here." ("Por favor, que el respeto se mantenga...Hasta pronto, porque la vida no termina aquí.")

Those that were suspected of having ordered the murder were never brought to justice. Andrés Escobar was mourned as a hero. The documentary notes that in 2009 the murder rate in Colombia was half of what it was during the Pablo Escobar era.

== Critical reception ==
The film was listed by The Times as one of the 10 best sports biopics of all time and was nominated for a Sports Emmy in 2011 by the National Academy of Television Arts and Sciences. In 2011 it was nominated for Best Documentary Screenplay by the Writers Guild of America. It was named the best film in the 30 for 30 series by the New York Post (2020), by Vulture Magazine (2013), 4th best of 104 films in the series by Athlon Sports (2022), and 6th best by Rolling Stone (2014).

It was a selection at a number of major film festivals: at the Cannes Film Festival,, the Tribeca Film Festival, the LA Film Festival, and the IDFA International Film Festival.

On the review aggregator website Rotten Tomatoes, 85% of 13 critics' reviews are positive. Metacritic, which uses a weighted average, assigned the film a score of 73 out of 100, based on 6 critics.

Writing for the Los Angeles Times in 2010, Robert Abele described it as "one of the best sports docs in recent memory." Sports Illustrated picked it as one of the best documentaries of the year and referred to it as "spectacular filmmaking...the most ambitious of ESPN's terrific 30 for 30 series." The Fort Worth Weekly listed it as one of the 10 best documentaries of 2010. Athlon Sports said "This film perfectly intertwines the stories of Colombian drug lord Pablo Escobar and soccer star Andrés Escobar all against the backdrop of a country in turmoil." The Hollywood Reporter described it as "heart-stopping."

In a more critical review, Eric Kohn, writing for IndieWire said "it jumps around...it often feels as if two stories are competing with each other; the parallels between Pablo and Andrés only intermittently come to light, resulting in parallel narratives", but that "nevertheless, the documentary provides an insightful means of eulogizing its chief subjects."

The film was praised for its extensive interviews. Pete Beatty, writing for Vulture Magazine wrote, "The rise and fall of Pablo Escobar and Colombian soccer are explored with unmatched depth — directors Jeff and Michael Zimbalist manage to get inside a Colombian prison to interview cartel hitmen — making this one of the best sports documentaries of the last decade." Kyle Scoble, writing for Urban Pitch, said, "this film is a blueprint on how to investigate a story."

== Further films in the series ==
The Zimbalist brothers subsequently directed two other documentaries in the 30 for 30 series: Arnold's Blueprint (2012), a short film about Arnold Schwarzenegger's early life, and Youngstown Boys (2013), a feature-length film about two Ohio State alumni, running back Maurice Clarett and former head coach Jim Tressel.

== See also ==
- 30 for 30
- List of 30 for 30 films
