= Marvin Thompson (disambiguation) =

Marvin Thompson (born 1977 or 1978) is a British poet.

Marvin Thompson may also refer to:

- Marvin Thompson (baseball), minor league player traded in 1980 for Gaylord Perry
- Marvin Thompson (U.S. Navy), commander in 2017-2018 of US Navy Task Force 76
- Marvin Thompson, appeared in 2018 documentary ReMastered: Who Killed Jam Master Jay?
- Marvin Thompson, fictional character in 1990s US TV series The Antagonists
