= ReMastered: Devil at the Crossroads =

2019 documentary film

- Film poster
- Directed by: Brian Oakes
- Written by: Jeff Zimbalist; Michael Zimbalist
- Starring: Robert Johnson; Terry Bean; Rory Block
- Distributed by: Netflix
- Release date: April 26, 2019
- Running time: 48 minutes
- Country: United States
- Language: English

ReMastered: Devil at the Crossroads is a 2019 documentary film about Robert Johnson, the blues singer, songwriter and musician. It was released on April 26, 2019 on Netflix streaming.

== Premise ==
The documentary takes a look at the short, mysterious life of Robert Johnson, the blues singer, songwriter and musician who has influenced later generations of musicians. The documentary title comes from the myth about how he made a deal with the Devil at a crossroads in rural Mississippi to achieve musical success.

== Cast ==
- Robert Johnson
- Terry Bean
- Rory Block
- Yvonne Chireau
- Eric Clapton
- Bruce Conforth
- Adam Gussow
- John Hammond
- Karlos Hill
- Jimmy Holmes
- Michael Johnson
- Steven Johnson
- Taj Mahal
- Keb' Mo'
- Bill "Howl-N-Madd" Perry
