= NAACP Image Award for Outstanding Documentary =

Winners and Nominees for the NAACP Image Award for Outstanding Documentary

This article lists the winners and nominees for the NAACP Image Award for Outstanding Documentary.

== History ==
This award was first given in 2008, before being discontinued after the 2009 ceremony. The award returned during the 2017 ceremony, this time honoring film and television documentaries separately.

== Winners and nominees ==
Winners are listed first and highlighted in bold.

=== 2000s ===
Year	Documentary	Ref
2008
2008	**Darfur Now**	
2008	Bastards of the Party	
2008	Desert Bayou	
2008	Price of Sugar	
2008	Sicko≠	
2009
2009	**Good Hair**	
2009	Capitalism: A Love Story	
2009	Crips and Bloods: Made in America	
2009	Crude	
2009	More Than a Game	

=== 2010s ===
==== Film ====
Year	Documentary	Ref
2017
2017	**13th**≠	
2017	I Am Not Your Negro≠	
2017	Maya Angelou: And Still I Rise	
2017	Miss Sharon Jones!	
2017	Olympic Pride, American Prejudice	
2018
2018	**Step**	
2018	I Called Him Morgan	
2018	Tell Them We Are Rising: The Story of Black Colleges and Universities	
2018	The Rape of Recy Taylor	
2018	Whose Streets?	
2019
2019	**Amazing Grace**	
2019	Making The Five Heartbeats	
2019	Quincy	
2019	RBG≠	
2019	Whitney	

==== Television ====
Year	Documentary	Ref
2017
2017	**Roots: A New Vision**	
2017	Major League Legends: Hank Aaron	
2017	Policing the Police	
2017	Roots: A History Revealed	
2017	Streets of Compton	
2018
2018	**The 44th President: In His Own Words**	
2018	Birth of a Movement	
2018	Black Love	
2018	The Defiant Ones	
2018	What the Health	
2019
2019	**Say Her Name: The Life and Death of Sandra Bland**	
2019	Hope & Fury: MLK, The Movement and the Media	
2019	King in the Wilderness	
2019	Shut Up & Dribble	
2019	Time for Ilhan	

=== 2020s ===
==== Film ====
Year	Documentary	Ref
2020
2020	**Toni Morrison: The Pieces I Am**	
2020	Miles Davis: Birth of the Cool	
2020	The Black Godfather	
2020	The Apollo	
2020	True Justice: Bryan Stevenson's Fight for Equality	
2021
2021	**John Lewis: Good Trouble**	
2021	All In: The Fight for Democracy	
2021	Coded Bias	
2021	Mr. Soul!	
2021	On the Record	
2022
2022	**Barbara Lee: Speaking Truth to Power**	
2022	Attica≠	
2022	My Name Is Pauli Murray	
2022	Summer of Soul±	
2022	Tina	

==== Television ====
Year	Documentary	Ref
2020
2020	**Hitsville: The Making of Motown**	
2020	Free Meek	
2020	Homecoming: A Film by Beyoncé	
2020	Martin: The Legacy of a King	
2020	ReMastered: The Two Killings of Sam Cooke	
2021
2021	**The Last Dance**	
2021	And She Could Be Next	
2021	Black Love	
2021	Enslaved: The Lost History of the Transatlantic Slave Trade	
2021	Unsung	
2022
2022	**High on the Hog: How African American Cuisine Transformed America**	
2022	1971: The Year Music Changed Everything	
2022	American Masters: How It Feels to Be True	
2022	Blood Brothers: Malcolm X and Muhammad Ali	
2022	Insecure Documentary	

== Footnotes ==
- ≠ indicates an Academy Award for Best Documentary Feature nomination
- ± indicates an Academy Award for Best Documentary Feature win
