= Matthew Mochary =

American businessman, investor, and filmmaker (b. 1968)

- Born: November 28, 1968 (age 57); New Jersey, United States
- Education: Yale University (B.A.); Kellogg School of Management (M.B.A.)
- Occupations: Investor; CEO Coach at Opendoor; CEO Coach at Coinbase
- Known for: Co-founder and Chairman of Totality Corporation, CEO Coach

Matt Mochary (born November 28, 1968) is an American businessman, investor, and filmmaker. Mochary is CEO Coach to companies including Coinbase, Opendoor, Bolt, and Clearbit. Mochary was a co-founder and chairman of Totality Corporation, founded in 1999 and acquired by MCI Inc. in 2005.

== Education and early career ==
The son of Mary V. Mochary, Mochary graduated from Phillips Academy Andover. He earned a B.A. in the Humanities from Yale University in 1990 and an M.B.A. from the Kellogg School of Management in 1996.

Between his time at Yale and Kellogg, Mochary spent time teaching at the Outward Bound school.

After Kellogg, he joined Spectrum Equity in 1996, where he was promoted to partner.

== Totality Corporation ==
In July 1999, Mochary co-founded Totality Corporation with Michael Carrier. The firm provided professional services for e-commerce websites. In 2000, MimEcom, as it then operated, was the recipient of what was at the time the second largest second round funding, $100 million. The largest second round funding at the time had been received by Loudcloud, Totality Corporation's main competitor. In 2005, MCI Inc. acquired Totality Corporation, and was subsequently acquired by Verizon.

== Other endeavors ==
Through Mochary Films, Matt produced and directed two feature-length documentaries, Favela Rising and The Gloves. Favela Rising debuted at the Tribeca Film Festival on April 24, 2005. Favela Rising won the award for Best New Documentary Filmmaker at the Tribeca Film Festival for directors Jeff Zimbalist and Mochary, and was shortlisted for the Academy Award for Best Feature Length Documentary.

Mochary acted as the CEO Coach of Tachyus Corporation, a technology firm that produces software for oil and gas companies, from February 2014 through June 2015. Mochary continues to maintain his role as major investor and Board Observer of Tachyus. Mochary also acts as the CEO Coach of Coinbase and Opendoor.

Mochary coaches technical founders of both for-profit and non-profit enterprises, such as the StreetCode Academy (formerly CodeCamp), which teaches high-schoolers in East Palo Alto to code.

Through the Mochary Foundation, Matt has worked with ex-convicts to train the individuals how to get and keep legitimate jobs.

In 2018 Mochary was the author of the online book for entrepreneurs Founder to CEO, a book on startup advice based on his startup experience.

== Personal life ==
Mochary was married to Tatiana Dorow. They used to live in Silicon Valley with their children.
