= Sara Dosa =

American documentary director and producer

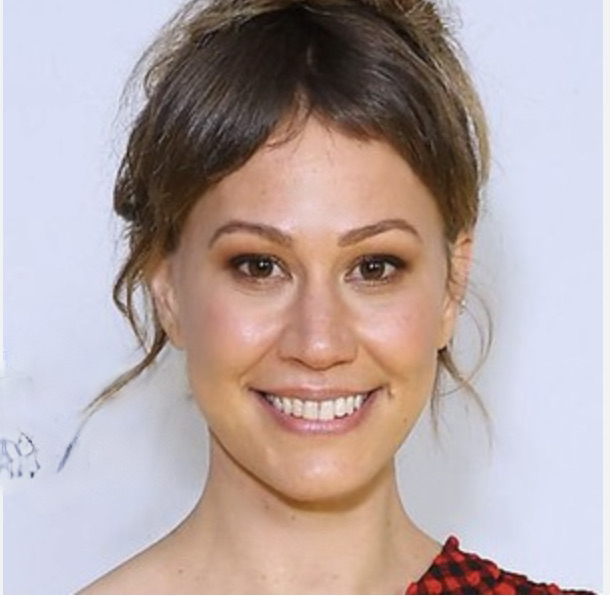
Sara Dosa accepting her Peabody Award for Fire of Love in 2023

Sara Dosa is an American documentary film director and producer. Dosa wrote, produced and directed the 2022 documentary film Fire of Love, which was nominated for a BAFTA and an Academy Award. Dosa won the 2023 DGA Award for Outstanding Directing for the film. Her other works have received Emmy and Independent Spirit Award, as well a Peabody win.

== Early life ==
Dosa is a graduate of Wesleyan University and has a master's degree in cultural anthropology and international development studies from the London School of Economics & Political Science where her work focused on critical theory, the anthropology of economy and geographies of power.

== Career ==
Dosa's first film as a director was 2014's The Last Season, which followed two war veterans turned wild mushroom hunters who form an unexpected friendship in the Oregon woods. It was nominated for the Independent Spirit "Truer Than Fiction" Award in 2015. In 2018 Dosa and Academy Award-winner Barbara Kopple co-directed an Emmy-nominated episode of Netflix's ReMastered Series, Tricky Dick & The Man in Black. That same year, Dosa was inducted into the Academy of Motion Picture Arts & Sciences, Documentary Branch in 2018.

In 2019 she directed and produced The Seer & The Unseen, about Icelandic seer Ragnhildur Jónsdóttir, who communicates with spirits of nature. The feature won awards at film festivals worldwide and was acquired by Utopia Distribution.

In 2022, Dosa directed Fire of Love which premiered at the Sundance Film Festival as the Day One film in US Documentary Competition. Fire of Love won the Jonathan Oppenheimer Editing Award for editors Erin Casper and Jocelyne Chaput and received critical acclaim, named by Indiewire as the top documentary out of Sundance in a survey of 135 critics. Fire of Love was acquired by National Geographic Films and was released in 2022. Fire of Love was nominated for an Academy Award for Best Documentary Feature Film at the 95th Academy Awards.

== Filmography ==
Director

- The Last Season (2014)
- ReMastered: Tricky Dick & the Man in Black (2018)
- The Seer & The Unseen (2019)
- Fire of Love (2022)
- Time and Water (2026)

Producer

- The Last Season (2014)
- Audrie & Daisy (2016)
- An Inconvenient Sequel: Truth to Power (2017)
- Melting Ice (2017)
- Survivors (2018)
- The Edge of Democracy (2019)
- The Seer & The Unseen (2019)
- Extase (2020)
- Fire of Love (2022)

Writer

- Fire of Love (2022)

== Awards and nominations ==
Year	Category	Film	Result
Peabody Awards 2017	Award of merit (producer)	Audrie & Daisy	Won
Peabody Awards 2022	Award of merit (producer)	Fire of Love	Won
Emmy Awards 2019	Outstanding Research	ReMastered: Tricky Dick and the Man in Black	Nominated
British Academy Film Awards 2023	Best Documentary	Fire of Love	Nominated
Academy Awards 2023	Best Documentary Feature	Fire of Love	Nominated
Directors Guild of America Award 2023	Best Directing for a Documentary Feature	Fire of Love	Won
