= ReMastered: Who Shot the Sheriff? =

2019 documentary film

- Directed by: Kief Davidson
- Written by: Jeff Zimbalist; Michael Zimbalist
- Starring: Bob Marley; Arnold Bertram; Cindy Breakspeare
- Music by: Asaf Sagiv
- Distributed by: Netflix
- Release date: October 12, 2018
- Running time: 57 minutes
- Country: United States
- Language: English

ReMastered: Who Shot the Sheriff? is a 2018 documentary film is centered around the 1976 assassination attempt on Bob Marley. The documentary was released by Netflix on October 12, 2018. It was nominated for an Emmy for Outstanding Arts & Culture Documentary at the 40th News and Documentary Emmy Award.

== Premise ==
As the story is told, we get an insight into the violent political suppression of the roots reggae movement in Jamaica, with the CIA's involvement in the mysterious shooting of Bob Marley.

== Cast ==
- Bob Marley
- Arnold Bertram
- Cindy Breakspeare
- Nancy Burke
- Jimmy Cliff
- Carl Colby
- Tommy Cowan
- Ras Gilly
- Vivien Goldman
- Laurie Gunst
- Diane Jobson
- Wayne Jobson
- Edward Seaga
- Roger Steffens
- Jeff Walker

== Release ==
It was released on October 12, 2018 on Netflix streaming.
