= Totality Corporation =

- Company type: Now owned by Verizon
- Founded: 1999 (as MimEcom, Inc.)
- Headquarters: San Francisco, California
- Key people: Matthew Mochary: Chairman and founder, Darl Davidson: CEO and President, Michael Carrier: CTO and founder
- Products: IT Management Software
- Website: MimeCom, Totality.com (no longer operational)

Totality Corporation was a venture-backed professional services and managed services provider based out of San Francisco, California, United States, from the years 1999 to 2005.

The senior management team and founders were primarily executives from EDS, Fort Point Partners, AOL/Netscape, IBM, Oracle and Sun Microsystems.

In late 2005 Totality was acquired by MCI which in turn was acquired by Verizon. Verizon now operates Totality under its brandname.

== History ==
Totality was a provider of application & infrastructure management services for large-scale e-commerce sites.

Totality was previously named "MimEcom", prior to the company going public in December 2000.

The company operated the domain name, www.totality.com.

In 2000 MimEcom was the recipient of what was at the time the second largest second round funding, $100 million, the first being its main competitor, Loudcloud.

In late 2005 Totality was acquired by MCI which in turn was acquired by Verizon.

== Customers ==
Totality customers included Smith & Hawken, Kaplan, Bluelight.com, Boats.com, Yachtworld.com, Garden.com and other businesses with online ecommerce offerings.
