= Francisco Maturana =

Colombian footballer (born 1949)

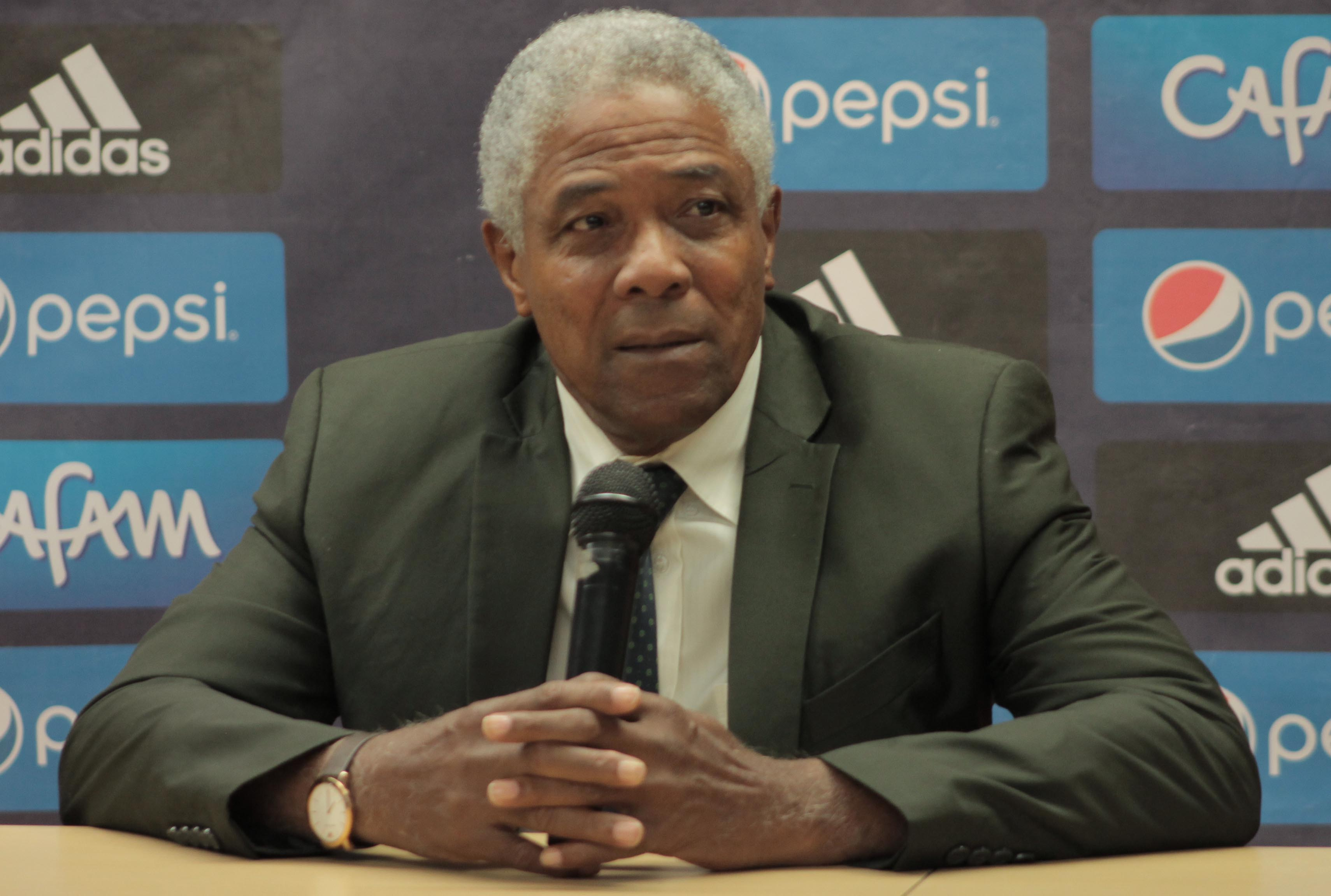
- Maturana in October 2017.

Personal information
- Date of birth: February 15, 1949 (age 77)
- Place of birth: Quibdó, Colombia
- Height: 1.81 m (5 ft 11 in)
- Position: Defender

Team information
- Current team: Atletico Nacional (sporting director)

Senior career*
Years	Team	Apps	(Gls)
1970–1980	Atlético Nacional	359	(15)
1981	Atlético Bucaramanga	22	(0)
1982	Deportes Tolima	32	(0)
Total		413	(15)

International career
1981	Colombia	6	(0)

Managerial career
- 1986: Once Caldas
- 1987–1990: Atlético Nacional
- 1987–1990: Colombia
- 1990–1991: Real Valladolid
- 1992–1993: América de Cali
- 1993–1994: Colombia
- 1994: Atlético Madrid
- 1995–1997: Ecuador
- 1998: Millonarios
- 1999: Costa Rica
- 1999–2000: Peru
- 2001: Colombia
- 2002: Al-Hilal
- 2002–2003: Colombia
- 2004: Colón de Santa Fe
- 2007: Gimnasia La Plata
- 2008–2009: Trinidad and Tobago
- 2011–2012: Al Nassr
- 2017: Once Caldas
- 2019: Venezuela (assistant)
- 2019: Royal Pari
- 2021: Independiente Medellín
- 2021: Atlético Nacional
- 2021–: Atletico Nacional (sporting director)
Medal record
Men's football
Representing Colombia (as manager)
Copa América
Winner	2001
- * Club domestic league appearances and goals

Francisco Antonio Maturana García, also known as Pacho Maturana (born February 15, 1949) is a Colombian ex-football player and football manager. Under his management, Atletico Nacional was the first team of the nation to win the Copa Libertadores in 1989, and the Colombia national football team to win Colombia's first ever International title: the Copa America in 2001.

He is currently a member of the FIFA Football Committee.

== Career ==
=== Player ===
Born in Quibdó, Chocó, Francisco Maturana moved with his family at an early age to the city of Medellín. Here he played professional football while attending the University of Antioquia, where he later obtained a degree in dentistry. He began his professional career in 1970 at Atlético Nacional, where he became a starting defender until 1980. During his time at Atlético Nacional he won two Colombian League Championships in 1973 and 1976. In 1981, he transferred to Atlético Bucaramanga and also played 6 matches with the Colombia National Team during the qualifying matches for the 1982 World Cup. In 1982, he played his last year with Deportes Tolima until he retired at the end of the season.

=== Manager ===
Motivated by Uruguayans Aníbal Ruíz and Luis Cubilla, he started managing the Colombian team Once Caldas in 1986. The following year, the Colombian Football Federation hired him to manage the national team's youth squad and was quickly promoted to manage the Senior Squad to compete in the 1987 Copa América, where they reached third place by beating the host Argentina. During this time, he was also hired to manage his former team, Atlético Nacional. Then, in 1989, he had his most successful year in his career. He led Atlético Nacional, composed of many Colombian legends, to win the Copa Libertadores for the first time for any Colombian club. Using Atlético Nacional players as a base for the National Team, he qualified the team for the 1990 World Cup after 28 years of absence. In December, he lost the Intercontinental Cup to AC Milan at the last minute of overtime. An upset to what would have been the perfect season. The following year he led Colombia to its best performance in World Cup competition until 2014 by reaching the second round and losing to Cameroon.

After the World Cup, he was hired as coach of Spain's Real Valladolid. He was rumored to be the next Real Madrid coach for the 1991–92 season. In 1993, he was voted as the South American coach of the year by El Pais and he was ranked third in Spanish Newspaper Marca's list of the world's greatest managers.

He returned to Colombia in 1992. and got his team América de Cali champion of Colombia. In 1993, he got Colombia qualified for a second time in a row to a World Cup, with a historic triumph over Argentina in Buenos Aires by 5–0. That score made Colombia a surprising favorite for the 1994 World Cup, but the performance there was disappointing, as the team was eliminated in the first round, being defeated by United States and Romania, although it was understood that the team's make-up had been heavily influenced by rampant threats from the cartel groups at the time.

He later had a brief stint as coach of Atlético Madrid and in 1995 he was hired as the trainer of Ecuador National Football Team. After failing to get Ecuador qualified for the 1998 FIFA World Cup, he returned to Colombia to coach Millonarios.

In 1999, he briefly coached Costa Rica, and in 2000 he also coached Peru for a few months. He would later return to coach Colombia for the 2001 Copa América, winning it for the first time. His latest jobs as a coach would include Saudi Arabian side Al-Hilal, where he won the domestic league and the Asian Champions League and a new stint for Colombia and Argentina's Colón de Santa Fe.

He worked for FIFA as a technical adviser where he has held various coaching seminars around the world with the likes of Fabio Capello and Cesar Menotti.

In April 2007 Maturana accepted an offer from Argentine Club de Gimnasia y Esgrima La Plata. He directed his first game on April 22, 2007, the derby against Estudiantes de La Plata. In August 2007 Maturana ended his relationship with Club de Gimnasia y Esgrima La Plata.

On February 1, 2009 he took up the position of head coach of Trinidad and Tobago's National Team. His first game in charge was against Guadeloupe on February 6 at the Queens Park Oval in Trinidad. However, on April 8, 2009, Maturana was sacked as manager of Trinidad and Tobago.

Maturana appears as a prominent interviewee in the 2010 documentary The Two Escobars, which detailed the rise of the drug kingpin Pablo Escobar and the murder of the unrelated football star Andrés Escobar following the 1994 World Cup.

In June 2019, he was appointed as a technical advisor for the national team of Venezuela in the 2019 Copa América.

== Honours ==
=== Player ===
Atlético Nacional

- Categoría Primera A (2): 1973, 1976

=== Manager ===
==== Club ====
Atlético Nacional

- Copa Libertadores (1): 1989

América de Cali

- Categoría Primera A (1): 1992

Al-Hilal

- Saudi Premier League (1): 2001-02

==== International ====
Colombia

- Copa América (1): 2001
