= How to Come Alive With Norman Mailer =

2024 documentary film about Norman Mailer

- Directed by: Jeff Zimbalist
- Written by: Victoria Marquette; Jeff Zimbalist
- Produced by: Victoria Marquette; Jeff Zimbalist
- Edited by: Alannah Byrnes
- Music by: Jacques Brautbar
- Production company: All Rise Films
- Distributed by: Kino Lorber
- Release date: 2024
- Running time: 102 minutes
- Country: United States
- Language: English
- Box office: $66,974

How to Come Alive With Norman Mailer is a 2024 American documentary film co-written, produced, and directed by Jeff Zimbalist. The film is about Norman Mailer. It was released theatrically in 50 U.S. cities by Kino Lorber and Zeitgeist Films.

== Reception ==
=== Critical response ===
On the review aggregator website Rotten Tomatoes, 100% of 10 critics' reviews are positive, with an average rating of 7.6/10.

Owen Gleiberman of Variety wrote, "How to Come Alive with Norman Mailer holds surprises even for Mailer fans. Yet as much as Mailer, with his braggadocio and heady male swagger, may not seem like he fits snugly into this day and age, I strongly suspect that if you're a young person who's a reader and you've never read a word that Norman Mailer wrote and you saw this movie, you'd be looking up one of his volumes within a day."

=== Accolades ===
It was nominated for an IDA Award for Best Documentary and the Grand Jury and Audience Awards at Doc NYC, and was the recipient of the Best Documentary Feature Award at the 2024 Atlanta Jewish Film Festival.
