= ReMastered: Tricky Dick & the Man in Black =

2019 documentary film

- Directed by: Sara Dosa; Barbara Kopple
- Written by: Jeff Zimbalist; Michael Zimbalist
- Starring: Johnny Cash; Richard Nixon; Aram Bakshian
- Distributed by: Netflix
- Release date: November 2, 2018
- Running time: 59 minutes
- Country: United States
- Language: English

ReMastered: Tricky Dick & the Man in Black is a 2018 documentary film about how President Richard Nixon, out of concern for the influence of rock-n-roll to the voters, invited Johnny Cash to the White House seeking the country music star's approval.

== Premise ==
ReMastered: Tricky Dick & the Man in Black is about the relationship between Johnny Cash and Richard Nixon and Cash's historic performance at the White House on April 17, 1970. During the visit, it becomes apparent that Cash's emerging ideals clashed with Richard Nixon's policies.

== Cast ==
- Johnny Cash
- Richard Nixon
- Aram Bakshian
- Pat Buchanan
- Alexander Butterfield
- John Carter Cash
- W.S. Holland
- Bill Miller
- Don Reid
- Lou Robin
- Jimmie Snow
- Mark Stielper
- Joanne Cash Yates
- Bill Zimmerman
- Bill Anderson

== Songs ==
The documentary includes the song "What Is Truth?"
