= ReMastered: Who Killed Jam Master Jay? =

2018 documentary film

- Directed by: Brian Oakes
- Written by: Jeff Zimbalist; Michael Zimbalist
- Starring: Jason Mizell; DJ Hurricane; Rahman Dukes
- Distributed by: Netflix
- Release date: December 7, 2018
- Running time: 58 minutes
- Country: United States
- Language: English

ReMastered: Who Killed Jam Master Jay? is a 2018 documentary film about the killing of Run DMC's Jam Master Jay, who was shot in a Jamaica, Queens recording studio in 2002.

== Premise ==
The documentary looks into the case of when DJ Jam Master Jay was killed at the age of 37. Despite six witnesses present at the scene of the crime, no one has ever been convicted. Jam Master Jay's friends and family speculate about the circumstances of the late DJ's unsolved murder.

== Cast ==
- Jason Mizell
- DJ Hurricane
- Rahman Dukes
- Darryl McDaniels
- David Seabrook
- Russell Simmons
- Marvin Thompson
- Trini Washington
- 50 Cent
- Beastie Boys
- Gerald Ford
- The Notorious B.I.G.
- NWA
- Public Enemy
- Paul Shaffer
