= Favela Rising =

2005 film directed by Matt Mochary, Jeff Zimbalist

- Theatrical release poster
- Directed by: Matt Mochary; Jeff Zimbalist
- Produced by: Ravi Anne
- Cinematography: Kelly Mark Green; Matt Mochary; Jeff Zimbalist
- Edited by: Jeff Zimbalist
- Music by: Force Theory; Michael Furjanic; Neill Sanford Livingston
- Distributed by: HBO/Cinemax Documentary; THINKFilm; VOY Pictures
- Release dates: April 24, 2005 (Tribeca Film Festival); June 2, 2006 (United States)
- Running time: 80 minutes
- Countries: Brazil; United States
- Language: Portuguese

Favela Rising is a 2005 documentary film by American directors Jeff Zimbalist and Matthew Mochary. It was produced by Sidetrack Films and VOY Pictures. It debuted at the Tribeca Film Festival on April 24, 2005, where it won the award for Best New Documentary Filmmaker for Zimbalist and Mochary. The film's look at life in Brazil's slums won it further awards such as Best Documentary Film from the New York Latino Film Festival and Best Feature Documentary from Big Sky Documentary Film Festival. The film has won over twenty-five international festival awards and was short-listed for an Oscar.

The film focuses on the work of Anderson Sá, a former drug trafficker who establishes the grassroots movement AfroReggae. The group, Grupo Cultural AfroReggae (AfroReggae Cultural Group), was initially intended to draw in adolescents interested in a number of musical genres. These genres include, but are not limited to soul, reggae, rap, and hip-hop. Early on, Grupo Cultural AfroReggae offered a different type of education to the youth it attracted. This education included workshops focusing on dance, recycling, football, percussion, and more. The group aims at using music and education to better the lives of youth and prevent further growth of gangs. Grupo Cultural AfroReggae believes that through education, there is a greater likelihood that adolescents will not get caught up in drugs and gang violence.

== Reception ==
On review aggregator website Rotten Tomatoes, the film holds an approval rating of 68% based on 19 reviews, with an average rating of 7.1/10. The website's consensus reads: "Frustratingly flawed yet ultimately uplifting, Favela Rising offers an engrossing -- and sobering -- glimpse of a culture that's far more complex than many viewers might realize."
