= ReMastered: The Two Killings of Sam Cooke =

2019 documentary film

- Film poster
- Directed by: Kelly Duane de la Vega
- Written by: Jeff Zimbalist; Michael Zimbalist; Kelly Duane de la Vega
- Starring: Sam Cooke; Quincy Jones; Smokey Robinson
- Distributed by: Netflix
- Release date: February 8, 2019
- Running time: 74 minutes
- Country: United States
- Language: English

ReMastered: The Two Killings of Sam Cooke is a 2019 documentary film about Sam Cooke, the artist and activist, and the circumstances and controversy surrounding his murder.

== Premise ==
On December 11, 1964, at the age of 33, Cooke was shot and killed by Bertha Franklin, the manager of the Hacienda Motel in Los Angeles, California. ReMastered: The Two Killings of Sam Cooke explores the mystery behind the murder through interviews with family, friends, journalists and academics as well as archival footage.

== Cast ==
- Sam Cooke
- Quincy Jones
- Smokey Robinson
- Dionne Warwick
- Lou Adler
- Al Schmitt
- Jerry Brandt
- Jim Brown
- Marjorie Cook
- Billy Davis
- Joan Dew
- Norman Edelen
- Renee Graham
- Erik Greene
- Spencer Leak
