= Michael Zimbalist =

American filmmaker

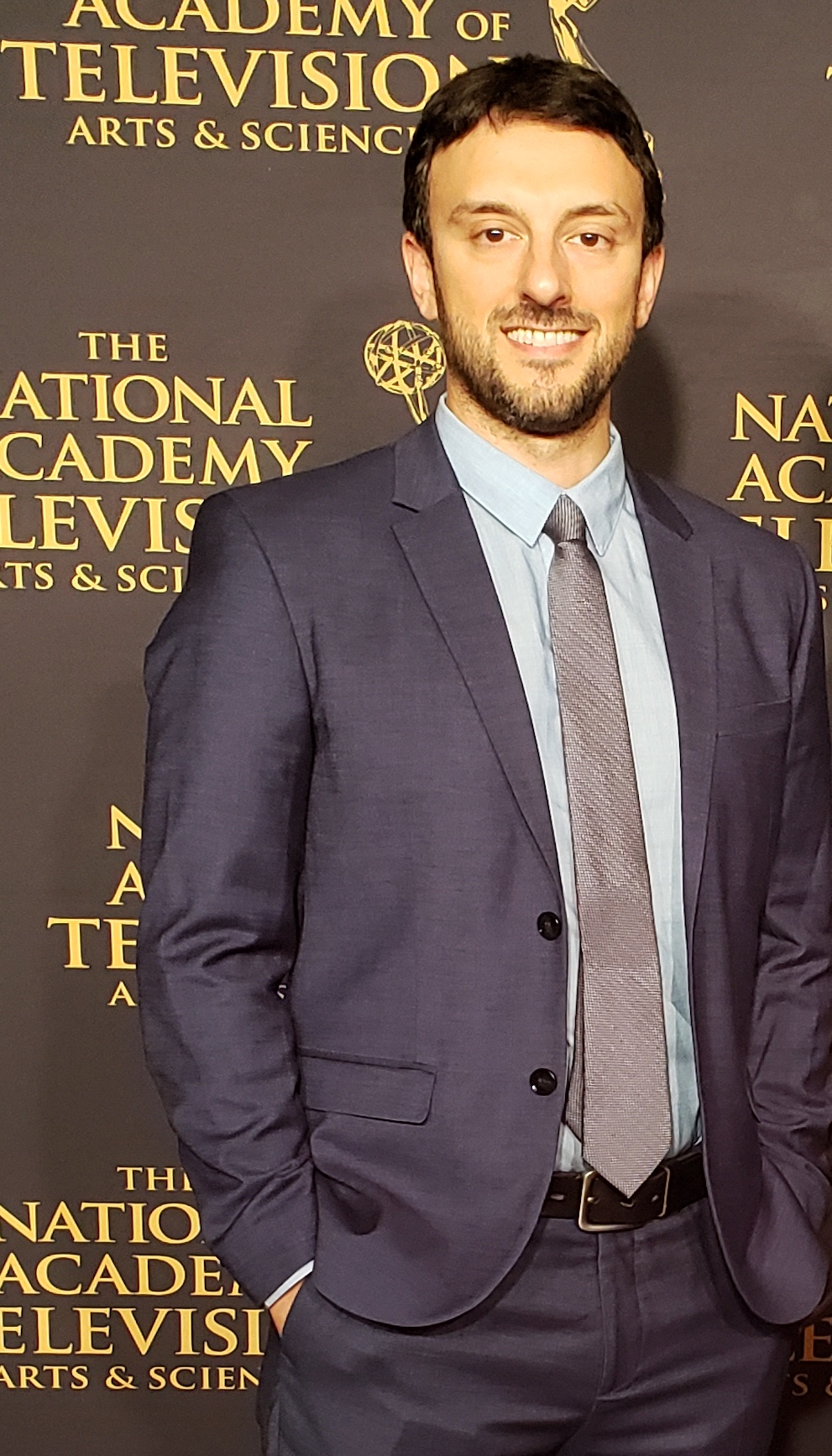
- Born: January 20, 1980 (age 46); Northampton, Massachusetts, U.S.
- Occupation: filmmaker
- Years active: 2006–present
- Spouse: Esperanza Montoya Jurado
- Parent: Andrew Zimbalist (father)
- Relatives: Jeff Zimbalist (brother)

Michael Zimbalist is an American filmmaker. He is a three-time Emmy Award and a Peabody Awards winner.

== Life and career ==
Michael Zimbalist was born in Northampton, Massachusetts. He graduated from Wesleyan University and trained as an actor at the New York University Tisch School of the Arts. He is a director, producer, and writer whose films have been broadcast on HBO, Netflix, Apple, Fox, Showtime, PBS, ESPN and the BBC, as well as theatrically distributed worldwide. He has also produced and directed commercial work for RealTruck, Gatorade, Pepsi, Verizon, and the NFL.

=== The Two Escobars ===
In 2010, Michael wrote, directed and produced The Two Escobars with his brother Jeff Zimbalist. The film was an official selection at the Cannes Film Festival, the Tribeca Film Festival, the Los Angeles Film Festival, the IDFA International Film Festival, and was released by Disney / ESPN Films. Sports Illustrated named the film the Documentary of the Year alongside The Tillman Story. The New York Post and Vulture ranked it as the best of the 150 films in the Academy Award-winning and Emmy Award-winning 30 for 30 series.

=== Youngstown Boys and 30 for 30 ===
Between 2010 and 2014, Michael produced four entries in the 30 for 30 series, including Arnold's Blueprint with Arnold Schwarzenegger, The Myth of Garrincha, and Youngstown Boys, about Maurice Clarett and Jim Tressel. Youngstown Boys, which Michael also co-wrote and directed, won the Sports Emmy Award in 2014.

=== Pelé and Loving Pablo ===
In 2016, Michael co-wrote and directed Pelé: Birth of a Legend, a scripted feature film about the soccer legend for Imagine Entertainment with Academy Award winner Brian Grazer producing and an original score from Academy Award winner A. R. Rahman. The film premiered at the Tribeca Film Festival and was released theatrically worldwide. In 2017, Michael wrote the story for and associate produced Loving Pablo, starring Javier Bardem and Penelope Cruz, which premiered at the Venice International Film Festival and the Toronto International Film Festival and was released by Universal Studios.

=== Nossa Chape, Momentum Generation, Give Us This Day, and Phenoms ===
In 2018, Michael co-wrote, produced and directed Nossa Chape, the critically acclaimed story of the Chapecoense soccer club airplane crash, which premiered at SXSW and was released in theaters and later broadcast by Fox. The same year, Michael co-wrote, produced and directed Momentum Generation, about the world’s most legendary surf crew, starring Kelly Slater and Rob Machado and executive produced by Robert Redford. It also won the Sports Emmy Award for Best Feature Documentary, and a Tribeca Film Festival Audience Award. Also in 2018, Michael co-wrote, produced and directed the feature documentary Give Us This Day, about three police officers and three residents in East St. Louis, the city with the highest homicide rate in the country, executive produced by Vince Vaughn. Additionally, in 2018, Michael produced and directed 6 episodes of Fox's series Phenoms, about young footballers in the lead up to the World Cup.

== Filmography ==
Year	Film	Director	Writer	Producer	Note
2023	Mayan Softball Revolution	Yes	Yes	Yes	Documentary
2022	The Trucket List	Yes	No	No	3 episodes
2021	The Line	No	No	Yes	Limited Series
2020	Cantera 5v5	Yes	Yes	Yes	TV special
2019	ReMastered: Devil at the Crossroads	No	Yes	Yes	Documentary
2019	ReMastered: The Miami Showband Massacre	No	Yes	Yes	Documentary
2019	ReMastered: The Two Killings of Sam Cooke	No	Yes	Yes	Documentary
2019	ReMastered: Massacre at the Stadium	No	Yes	Yes	Documentary
2019	Ordinary Gods	Yes	No	Yes	Documentary
2018	ReMastered: Tricky Dick & the Man in Black	No	Yes	Yes	Documentary
2018	ReMastered: The Lion's Share	No	Yes	Yes	Documentary
2018	ReMastered: Who Killed Jam Master Jay?	No	Yes	Yes	Documentary
2018	ReMastered: Who Shot the Sheriff?	No	Yes	Yes	Documentary
2018	Give Us This Day	Yes	Yes	Yes	Documentary
2018	Momentum Generation	Yes	Yes	Yes	Documentary
2018	Nossa Chape	Yes	Yes	Yes	Documentary
2018	Phenoms	Yes	Yes	Yes	11 episodes
2017	Loving Pablo	No	Yes	Yes	Feature film
2016	Pelé: Birth of a Legend	Yes	Yes	No	Feature film
2016	Battling Back	Yes	Yes	Yes	Documentary
2016	The 18th Annual 'A Home for the Holidays'	Yes	No	Yes	TV special
2015	The 17th Annual 'A Home for the Holidays'	Yes	No	Yes	TV special
2015	Shadowboxing	No	No	Yes	Short film
2014	30 for 30: The Myth of Garrincha	No	No	Yes	Documentary short
2013	Youngstown Boys	Yes	Yes	Yes	Documentary
2012	30 for 30: Arnold's Blueprint	Yes	Yes	Yes	Documentary short
2010	The Two Escobars	Yes	Yes	Yes	Documentary
2007	The Addiction Project	No	No	Yes	9 episodes
2007	Hijos de la guerra	No	Yes	No	Documentary

== Awards and nominations ==
Year	Result	Award	Category	Work	Ref.
2022	Nominated	News & Documentary Emmy Awards	Best Documentary	The Line	
2022	Nominated	News & Documentary Emmy Awards	Outstanding Investigative Documentary	The Line	
2020	Won	News & Documentary Emmy Awards	Outstanding Arts & Culture Documentary	ReMastered: The Lion's Share	
2020	Nominated	News & Documentary Emmy Awards	Outstanding Historical Documentary	ReMastered: Massacre at the Stadium	
2020	Nominated	NAACP Image Awards	Outstanding Documentary	ReMastered: The Two Killings of Sam Cooke	
2019	Nominated	News & Documentary Emmy Awards	Outstanding Arts & Culture Documentary	ReMastered: Who Shot the Sheriff?	
2019	Nominated	News & Documentary Emmy Awards	Outstanding Research	ReMastered: Tricky Dick & the Man in Black	
2019	Won	Sports Emmy Awards	Outstanding Long Sports Documentary	Momentum Generation	
2019	Nominated	Sports Emmy Awards	Outstanding Music Composition/Direction/Lyrics	Momentum Generation	
2018	Won	Whistler Film Festival	World Documentary Award	Momentum Generation	
2018	Won	Tribeca Film Festival	Audience Award	Momentum Generation	
2018	Nominated	American Film Festival	Best Documentary Feature	Momentum Generation	
2018	Nominated	Hamptons International Film Festival	Best Documentary Award	Momentum Generation	
2017	Nominated	Santa Barbara International Film Festival	Best Documentary Short	Battling Back	
2014	Won	Sports Emmy Awards	Outstanding Edited Sports Series/Anthology	30 for 30 Youngstown Boys	
2011	Nominated	Writers Guild of America	Best Documentary Screenplay	The Two Escobars	
2010	Nominated	Tribeca Film Festival	Best Documentary Feature	The Two Escobars	
2010	Nominated	Doha Tribeca Film Festival	Best Documentary Feature	The Two Escobars	
2010	Nominated	São Paulo International Film Festival	Best Documentary	The Two Escobars	
2010	Won	American Film Festival	Best Film	The Two Escobars	
2010	Nominated	Zurich Film Festival	Best International Documentary Film	The Two Escobars	
