= Jeff Zimbalist =

American filmmaker

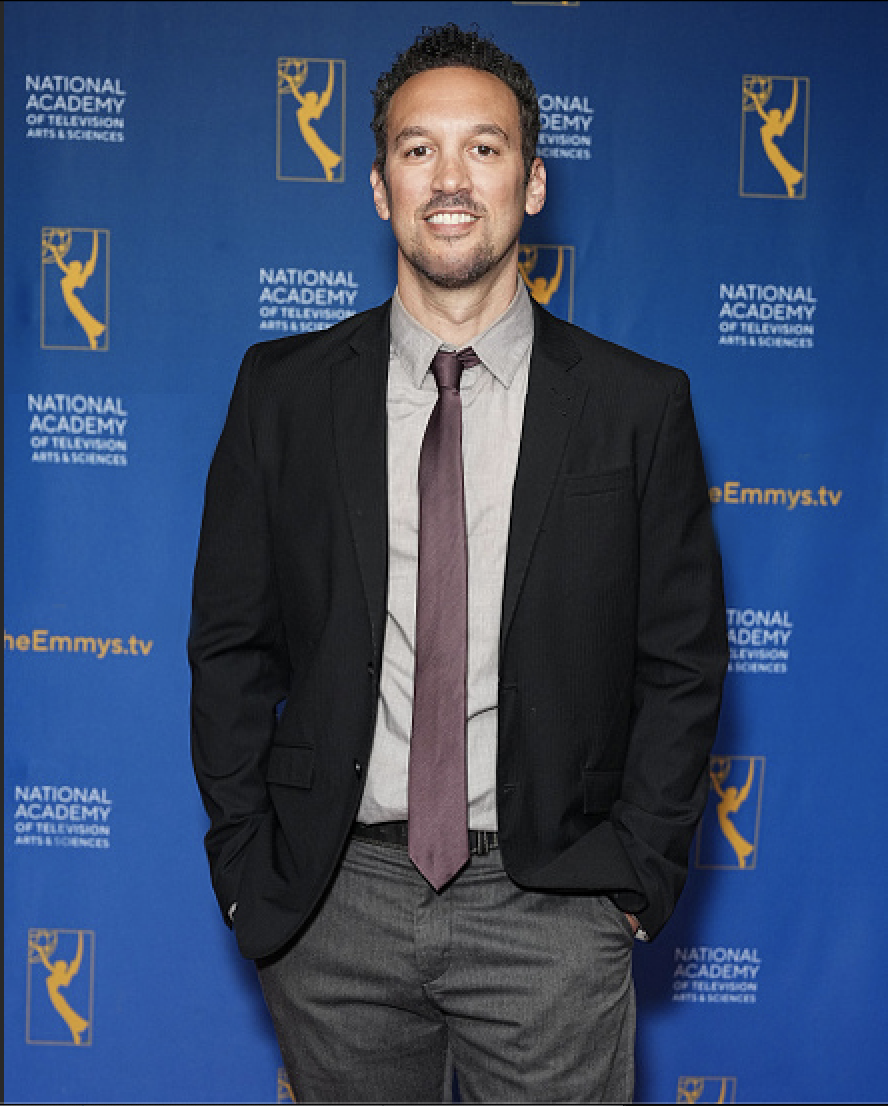
- Zimbalist at the Emmy 2024 red carpet
- Born: Massachusetts, U.S.
- Education: Brown University
- Occupation: filmmaker
- Years active: 2005–present
- Parent: Andrew Zimbalist
- Relatives: Michael Zimbalist

Jeffrey Leib Nettler Zimbalist is an American filmmaker. He has been Academy Award shortlisted, has won a Peabody, a DuPont, 5 Emmy Awards with 21 Emmy nominations. He is the owner of film and television production company All Rise Films.

== Early life ==
Zimbalist was born in a Jewish family. He received his bachelor's degree from Brown University in Providence, Rhode Island.

== Career ==
Zimbalist's films have been shown on Netflix, HBO, Apple, ESPN, Showtime, CBS, Paramount+ and theatrically exhibited. He has done commercial work for Gatorade, Pepsi, Verizon, the National Football League, and other organizations.

Zimbalist's work has also been featured in a retrospective at the Big Sky Documentary Film Festival, at the Museum of the Moving Image, the Museum of Contemporary Art, Chicago, the Brooklyn Museum of Art, the Massachusetts Museum of Contemporary Art, the Museum of Fine Arts, Boston and the Institute of Contemporary Arts in London.

=== Filmography ===
==== Favela Rising (2005) ====
In 2005, Zimbalist teamed up with Matt Mochary to direct and produce the documentary Favela Rising. The film follows the life of Anderson Sa through the favelas of Rio de Janeiro in his attempt to use AfroReggae music to provide a positive outlet for the residents of a dangerous environment.

The film was distributed by Thinkfilm and HBO Documentary Films in North America and was theatrically released in 16 countries. Together with Mochary, Zimbalist won the Best Emerging Filmmaker Award at the 2005 TriBeCa Film Festival. The film also garnered a 2006 Emmy Nomination, was named as the 2005 International Documentary Association's Film of the Year, was shortlisted for the Academy Award for Best Documentary Feature in 2005, and won 36 International Film Festival Awards.

==== The Two Escobars (2010) ====
In 2010, Disney / ESPN Films released The Two Escobars which Zimbalist directed and produced with his brother Michael. Zimbalist also was credited as the director of photography and editor. The film was nominated for another Emmy and was an official selection at the Cannes Film Festival, the Tribeca Film Festival, the Los Angeles Film Festival, and the IDFA International Film Festival.

In 2011, Jeff and Michael Zimbalist's script for The Two Escobars was nominated for a best nonfiction script by the Writers Guild of America, named a top 10 sports film of all time by The Times, and was named 2010 Documentary of the Year alongside The Tillman Story by Sports Illustrated. Of the over 150 films in the Academy Award-winning and Emmy Award-winning 30 for 30 series, the New York Post and Vulture ranked The Two Escobars as the best one.

In 2019, The Hollywood Reporter ranked 30 for 30 the 5th best TV series of the decade behind Breaking Bad, Mad Men, Rectify, and Parks and Recreation. The Zimbalists shared the 2011 Peabody Award with this first season of ESPN Films 30 for 30 filmmakers.

Since, the Zimbalist brothers also directed two other entries into the 30 for 30 series, including Arnold's Blueprint with Arnold Schwarzenegger and Youngstown Boys, featuring hall-of-famer Jim Brown, which won an Emmy in 2014.

==== Pelé, Loving Pablo (2011—2017) ====
Zimbalist directed The Greatest Love Story Ever Told about the Bollywood film industry in India, produced by Shekhar Kapur, which premiered at the Cannes Film Festival in 2011.

In 2014, the Zimbalist brothers wrote and directed Pelé: Birth of a Legend with Pelé for Imagine Entertainment with Brian Grazer producing and an original score from AR Rahman.

Zimbalist also wrote and produced Loving Pablo starring Javier Bardem and Penelope Cruz, which premiered at the Venice International Film Festival and the Toronto International Film Festival and was released by Universal Studios.

==== Momentum Generation, Nossa Chape, Give Us This Day (2018) ====
In 2018, Zimbalist won an Emmy and an Audience Award at the Tribeca Film Festival alongside 25 other international film festival awards, 5 New York Film & TV Gold Awards and the Grand Prize, and two Emmy nominations for his documentary Momentum Generation, starring Kelly Slater and Rob Machado and executive produced by Robert Redford.

The same year, Zimbalist premiered Nossa Chape at the SxSw Film Festival. Nossa Chape was released theatrically in the US on June 1, 2018 by Fox with an introduction by Dwayne "The Rock" Johnson and broadcast premiered during the World Cup on Fox June 23, 2018. Nossa Chape won Best Picture at the 2018 Los Angeles Film Awards, where Momentum Generation won Best Inspirational Film, and the Zimbalist Brother's feature documentary Give Us This Day, produced by Vince Vaughn, tracking 3 police officers and 3 residents in the highest homicide rate city in the U.S., won the Best Director honor. Give Us This Day also won 4 Medals at the New York Film & TV Awards.

Also in 2018, Zimbalist released the 20-episode Phenoms series on Fox Sports about rising global soccer stars.

==== ReMastered, Heist, The Line Series (2019—2021) ====
In 2019, Zimbalist created and was showrunner on the Netflix investigative music documentary series ReMastered, executive produced by Irving Azoff. The series featured episodes on Bob Marley, Johnny Cash, Robert Johnson, Run DMC, and others, with appearances by Quincy Jones and Russell Simmons, and an episode directed by Barbara Kopple. ReMastered was nominated for 6 Emmys, won an Emmy for Best Arts and Culture Documentary for The Lion's Share, was nominated for an NAACP award for The Two Killings of Sam Cooke and topped Netflix highest rated documentaries of 2019 with the episode Who Shot The Sheriff. David Browne wrote in Rolling Stone, "Eye opening, all-in reporting brings fresh insight to tales and myths we thought we knew". The episode Who Killed Jam Master Jay? pointed to two suspects as the likely culprits of the rapper's unsolved murder from 15 years earlier. A year after ReMastered's release, the NYPD arrested the same two men indicated in the episode.

In 2021, Zimbalist was executive producer on Dirty Robber's Heist series, which was released on Netflix and ranked in Netflix top 5 worldwide and top 10 in the United States in July, 2021.

Zimbalist also directed and executive produced Jigsaw's The Line series for Apple TV+ with Executive Producer Alex Gibney, which won a Columbia DuPont Journalism Award in 2021 and was nominated for two Emmy Awards in the Best Documentary and Outstanding Investigative Documentary categories.

==== Skywalkers, 11 Minutes, With This Breath I Fly, Invisible Beauty, The War For Football (2022—2024) ====
In 2022, Zimbalist executive produced and directed the series 11 Minutes, which became the highest rated documentary program on Paramount+ since the streamer launched and received an Emmy nomination for Outstanding Current Affairs Documentary, won two gold medals at the New York TV & Film Awards for best nonfiction series and best direction, and won the Christopher Award in 2023.

Alongside Angelina Jolie, he also executive produced With This Breath I Fly about two women incarcerated in Afghanistan for so-called "moral crimes." With This Breath I Fly won 13 film festival awards.

In 2023, Zimbalist executive produced Invisible Beauty about black fashion pioneer Bethann Hardison, which premiered at the Sundance Film Festival, was theatrically distributed by Magnolia Pictures, and won an NAACP Award for Best Documentary.

Alongside Connor Schell, Zimbalist also executive produced and directed the Apple+ series Super League: The War for Football which won two Emmys in 2024 for Outstanding Documentary Series and Outstanding Design.

Zimbalist's film How to Come Alive With Norman Mailer was nominated for an IDA Award for Best Documentary and the Grand Jury and Audience Awards at Doc NYC Film Festival. The film was released theatrically in 50 U.S. cities by Kino Lorber and Zeitgeist Films, receiving positive reviews from the New York Times, The Atlantic, and Variety, among others.

In 2024, Zimbalist also received an Emmy Nomination for his Paramount+ series CRUSH about the South Korea crowd disaster."

Zimbalist premiered Skywalkers: A Love Story in the U.S. Documentary Competition at the 2024 Sundance Film Festival, where it received positive reviews. The Daily Beast wrote, "It's a thriller, a heist caper, and a surprisingly moving romance all in one, and it seems destined to be one of the breakout hits of this year's Sundance Film Festival." Indiewire called it "Man on Wire" for the Instagram age." The Toronto Star called it a "real-life "Mission: Impossible"... so engrossing, it makes "edge of your seat" seem like an understatement," and Variety wrote, "The film's exhilaration is that it shows you, through its dangling-from-a-steel-beam footage, what love really is: scaling the heights of devotion, no matter how perilous, without a net," with many reviews comparing it to Free Solo and Man on Wire. In a competitive bidding situation, Skywalkers landed at Netflix with an IMAX theatrical release. Skywalkers: A Love Story won the Audience Award at the Miami International Film Festival, played at the Tribeca Film Festival 2024, and was nominated for the Cinema Eye Honors Audience Award

==== The Stringer, Final Twist (2025—2026) ====
Jeff created, executive produces, and showruns Harlan Coben's Final Twist for CBS primetime and Paramount+. The show announced its second season in April, 2026.

Jeff also executive produced the Sundance documentary The Stringer directed by Bao Nguyen, which sold to Netflix and was nominated for four Emmy Awards.

== Charitable work ==
Zimbalist has produced development documentaries and consulted for clients in the United States, South Asia, Africa, and Latin America, including the Ford Foundation, the World Bank, the Templeton Foundation, the Inter-American Development Bank, the UNDP, and various international nonprofit service organizations. He is a Massachusetts State Cultural Council Fellow, a Cinereach grantee, a San Francisco Film Society Rainin Grant recipient, LEF grant recipient, and a Ford Foundation Grantee.

Zimbalist has taught at the New York Film Academy and the Maine Photographic Workshops.

Zimbalist's done philanthropy work for Amigos de las Américas, an organization that he volunteered with as a teenager.
