= List of Tom Hanks performances and credits =

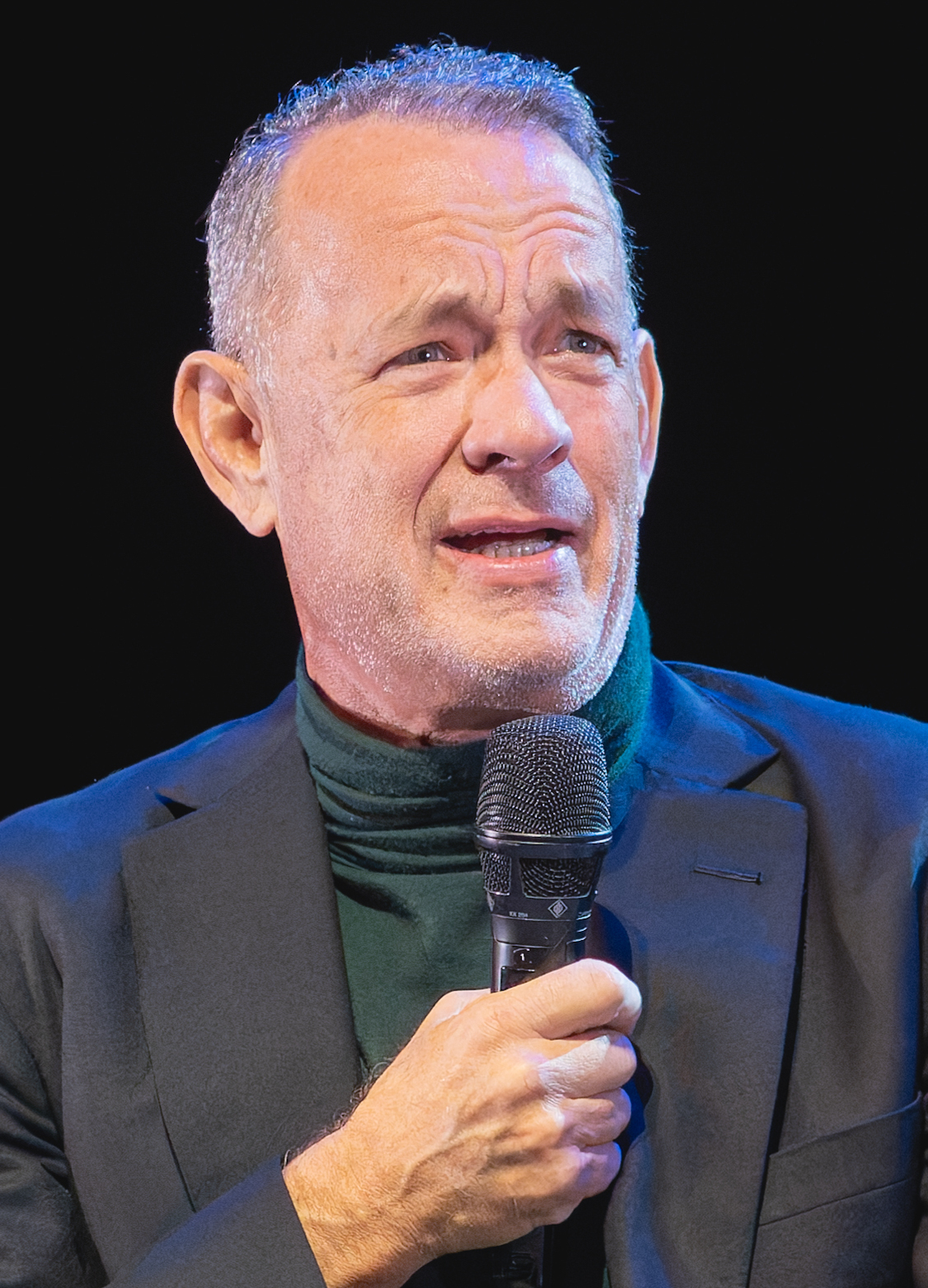
Tom Hanks in 2023

Tom Hanks is an American actor and filmmaker who has had an extensive career in film, television and stage. Hanks made his professional acting debut on stage, playing Grumio in a 1977 Great Lakes Theater production of The Taming of the Shrew. He made his film debut with a minor role in the 1980 horror film, He Knows You're Alone. In the same year, Hanks appeared in the television series Bosom Buddies, a role that led to guest appearances on several shows, including Happy Days with Ron Howard. Howard cast him in his first leading role in the Ron Howard-directed fantasy romantic comedy, Splash. His breakthrough role was in Penny Marshall's age-changing comedy, Big, for which he garnered his first nomination for the Academy Award for Best Actor.

In 1993, Hanks starred with Meg Ryan in the Nora Ephron-directed romantic comedy, Sleepless in Seattle. Later that year, he starred in the drama Philadelphia as a gay lawyer with AIDS fighting discrimination in his law firm. For his performance, Hanks earned his first Academy Award for Best Actor. He followed with the 1994 romantic comedy-drama, Forrest Gump, winning a consecutive second Academy Award for Best Actor (the first actor since Spencer Tracy in 1938 to achieve this feat). In 1995, he played astronaut Jim Lovell in the Howard-directed historical drama Apollo 13, and voiced Sheriff Woody in the animated film Toy Story (a role that he would reprise in four sequels).

Hanks made his debut as a director and screenwriter with the 1996 musical comedy, That Thing You Do!. Later that year, he and Gary Goetzman founded the production company Playtone. In 1998, Hanks executive produced the Emmy Award-winning docudrama miniseries From the Earth to the Moon, and starred in the Steven Spielberg-directed epic war film, Saving Private Ryan, which earned him his fourth nomination for Best Actor at the Academy Awards. Later that year, he reunited with Ryan and Ephron for the romantic comedy, You've Got Mail. In 2000, Hanks starred in Cast Away, earning the Golden Globe Award for Best Actor – Motion Picture Drama, and a fifth nomination for Academy Award for Best Actor. In 2001, he executive produced the Emmy Award-winning World War II mini-series Band of Brothers and the romantic comedy My Big Fat Greek Wedding. The following year, at 45 years, Hanks became the youngest person to receive the lifetime achievement award from the American Film Institute.

In 2006, he played Professor Robert Langdon in Howard's The Da Vinci Code, an adaptation of the best-selling book of the same name. In 2008, he served as executive producer for the musical comedy, Mamma Mia!, and the Emmy Award-winning mini-series, John Adams. Hanks made his Broadway debut in 2013 in Ephron's play Lucky Guy, which earned him a nomination for the Tony Award for Best Actor in a Play. He portrayed television personality Fred Rogers in the 2019 drama A Beautiful Day in the Neighborhood, for which he garnered nominations for Best Supporting Actor at the Academy Awards, British Academy Film Awards, and Golden Globe Awards.

== Film ==
Year	Title	Credited as			Notes	Ref(s)
Year	Title	Actor	Producer	Role(s)	Notes	Ref(s)
1980	He Knows You're Alone	Yes	No	Elliot		
1984	Splash	Yes	No	Allen Bauer		
1984	Bachelor Party	Yes	No	Rick Gassko		
1985	The Man with One Red Shoe	Yes	No	Richard Harlan Drew		
1985	Volunteers	Yes	No	Lawrence Whatley Bourne III		
1986	The Money Pit	Yes	No	Walter Fielding Jr.		
1986	Nothing in Common	Yes	No	David Basner		
1986	Every Time We Say Goodbye	Yes	No	David Bradley		
1987	Dragnet	Yes	No	Detective Pep Streebek		
1988	Big	Yes	No	Josh Baskin		
1988	Punchline	Yes	No	Steven Gold		
1989	The 'Burbs	Yes	No	Ray Peterson		
1989	Turner & Hooch	Yes	No	Detective Scott Turner		
1990	Joe Versus the Volcano	Yes	No	Joe Banks		
1990	The Bonfire of the Vanities	Yes	No	Sherman McCoy		
1992	Radio Flyer	Yes	No	Older Mike / Narrator		
1992	A League of Their Own	Yes	No	Jimmy Dugan		
1993	Sleepless in Seattle	Yes	No	Sam Baldwin		
1993	Philadelphia	Yes	No	Andrew Beckett		
1994	Forrest Gump	Yes	No	Forrest Gump		
1995	Apollo 13	Yes	No	Jim Lovell		
1995	Toy Story	Yes	No	Sheriff Woody	Voice only	
1996	That Thing You Do!	Yes	No	Mr. White	Also director and screenwriter	
1997	I Am Your Child	Yes	No	Host		
1998	Saving Private Ryan	Yes	No	Captain John H. Miller		
1998	You've Got Mail	Yes	No	Joe Fox		
1999	Toy Story 2	Yes	No	Sheriff Woody	Voice only	
1999	The Green Mile	Yes	No	Paul Edgecomb		
2000	Cast Away	Yes	Yes	Chuck Noland		
2002	My Big Fat Greek Wedding	No	Yes	—N/a		
2002	Road to Perdition	Yes	No	Michael Sullivan Sr.		
2002	Catch Me If You Can	Yes	No	FBI Agent Carl Hanratty		
2004	The Ladykillers	Yes	No	Professor G.H. Dorr		
2004	Connie and Carla	No	Yes	—N/a		
2004	Elvis Has Left the Building	Yes	No	Mailbox Elvis		
2004	The Terminal	Yes	No	Viktor Navorski		
2004	The Polar Express	Yes	Executive	Various roles	Voice only	
2005	Magnificent Desolation: Walking on the Moon 3D	Yes	Yes	Narrator	Documentary	
2006	Cars	Yes	No	Woody Car	Voice only	
2006	The Ant Bully	No	Yes	—N/a		
2006	The Da Vinci Code	Yes	No	Professor Robert Langdon		
2006	Starter for 10	No	Yes	—N/a		
2006	The Queen	Yes	No	Himself	Archive footage	
2007	Evan Almighty	No	Executive	—N/a		
2007	Charlie Wilson's War	Yes	Yes	Charlie Wilson		
2007	The Simpsons Movie	Yes	No	Himself	Voice only	
2008	Mamma Mia!	No	Executive	—N/a		
2008	City of Ember	No	Yes	—N/a		
2009	The Great Buck Howard	Yes	Yes	Mr. Gable		
2009	Where the Wild Things Are	No	Yes	—N/a		
2009	Beyond All Boundaries	Yes	Executive	Narrator	Documentary	
2009	My Life in Ruins	No	Executive	—N/a		
2009	Angels & Demons	Yes	No	Professor Robert Langdon		
2010	Toy Story 3	Yes	No	Sheriff Woody	Voice only	
2011	Hawaiian Vacation	Yes	No	Sheriff Woody	Short film, voice only	
2011	Larry Crowne	Yes	Yes	Larry Crowne	Also director and screenwriter	
2011	Extremely Loud & Incredibly Close	Yes	No	Thomas Schell Jr.		
2011	Small Fry	Yes	No	Sheriff Woody	Short film, voice only	
2012	Partysaurus Rex	Yes	No	Sheriff Woody	Short film, voice only	
2012	Cloud Atlas	Yes	No	Various roles		
2013	Parkland	No	Yes	—N/a		
2013	Captain Phillips	Yes	No	Captain Richard Phillips		
2013	Saving Mr. Banks	Yes	No	Walt Disney		
2015	Misery Loves Comedy	Yes	No	Himself	Documentary	
2015	Bridge of Spies	Yes	No	James B. Donovan		
2015	Ithaca	Yes	Executive	Mr. Macauley		
2016	My Big Fat Greek Wedding 2	No	Yes	—N/a		
2016	A Hologram for the King	Yes	Yes	Alan Clay		
2016	Sully	Yes	No	Captain Chesley "Sully" Sullenberger		
2016	California Typewriter	Yes	No	Himself	Documentary	
2016	Inferno	Yes	No	Professor Robert Langdon		
2017	The Circle	Yes	Yes	Eamon Bailey		
2017	The Post	Yes	No	Ben Bradlee		
2018	Mamma Mia! Here We Go Again	No	Executive	—N/a		
2019	Toy Story 4	Yes	No	Sheriff Woody	Voice only	
2019	A Beautiful Day in the Neighborhood	Yes	No	Fred Rogers		
2020	Greyhound	Yes	No	Commander Ernest Krause	Also screenplay	
2020	Borat Subsequent Moviefilm	Yes	No	Himself		
2020	News of the World	Yes	No	Captain Jefferson Kyle Kidd		
2021	Finch	Yes	No	Finch Weinberg		
2022	Elvis	Yes	No	Colonel Tom Parker		
2022	Pinocchio	Yes	No	Geppetto		
2022	A Man Called Otto	Yes	Yes	Otto Anderson		
2023	Asteroid City	Yes	No	Stanley Zak		
2023	My Big Fat Greek Wedding 3	No	Yes	—N/a		
2024	Freaky Tales	Yes	No	Hank		
2024	Here	Yes	No	Richard Young		
2025	The Phoenician Scheme	Yes	No	Leland		
2025	John Candy: I Like Me	Yes	No	Himself	Documentary	
2026	Toy Story 5	Yes	No	Sheriff Woody	Voice only	
2027	The Comebacker †	Yes	Yes		Filming	
TBA	Greyhound 2 †	Yes	No	Commander Ernest Krause	Post-production, also screenwriter	
TBA	Lincoln in the Bardo †	Yes	Yes	Abraham Lincoln	Post-production	

Key
†	Denotes films that have not yet been released

== Television ==
Year(s)	Title	Credited as				Notes	Ref(s)
Year(s)	Title	Actor	Producer	Other	Role(s)	Notes	Ref(s)
1980	The Love Boat	Yes	No	No	Rick Martin	Episode: "Sergeant Bull/Friends and Lovers/Miss Mother"	
1980–1982	Bosom Buddies	Yes	No	No	Kip/Buffy Wilson	37 episodes	
1982	Mazes and Monsters	Yes	No	No	Robbie Wheeling	Television film	
1982	Taxi	Yes	No	No	Gordon	Episode: "The Road Not Taken: Part 1"	
1982	Happy Days	Yes	No	No	Dr. Dwayne Twitchell	Episode: "A Little Case of Revenge"	
1983–1984	Family Ties	Yes	No	No	Ned Donnelly	2 episodes (Note: Hanks acted in the Episodes: "The Fugitive" Parts 1 & 2 and Episode: "Say Uncle")	(Note: Numerous sources cited here:)
1985–2024	Saturday Night Live	Yes	No	Host	Various characters	10 times as host (1985–2020); 10 times as guest/cameo (2001–2024)	(Note: Numerous sources cited:)
1992	Tales from the Crypt	Yes	No	Director	Baxter	Episode: "None but the Lonely Heart"	
1993	Fallen Angels	Yes	No	Director	Trouble Boy #1	Episode: "I'll Be Waiting"	
1993	A League of Their Own	No	No	Director	—N/a	Episode: "The Monkey's Curse"	
1996	68th Academy Awards	Yes	No	No	Sheriff Woody	Television special; voice role	
1998	From the Earth to the Moon	Yes	Executive	Director and screenwriter	Jean-Luc Despont (Note: Appeared in the episode: "Le voyage dans la lune")	Director (1 ep) / Writer (4 eps) (Note: Hanks directed the episode: "Can We Do This?")	(Note: Numerous sources cited here:)
2000	Shooting War	No	No	Narrator	—N/a	Documentary	
2000	72nd Academy Awards	Yes	No	No	Sheriff Woody	Television special; voice role	
2001	Band of Brothers	Yes	Executive	Director and screenwriter	British Officer (cameo)	Miniseries; Actor (1 episode); Director (1 ep) / Screenwriter (1 ep) (Note: Hanks directed the episode "Crossroads" and wrote the episode: "Currahee")	(Note: Numerous sources cited here:)
2001	We Stand Alone Together: The Men of Easy Company	No	Executive	No	—N/a	Documentary	
2002	Life with Bonnie	Yes	No	No	Himself	Episode: "What If"	
2003	Freedom: A History of US	Yes	No	No	Lincoln / Wood / Boone	7 episodes; voice role	
2003	The Rutles 2: Can't Buy Me Lunch	Yes	No	No	Himself	Television film	
2006–2011	Big Love	No	Executive	No	—N/a		
2008	John Adams	No	Executive	No	—N/a		
2010	The Pacific	No	Executive	Narrator	—N/a	Miniseries; 6 episodes	
2011	30 Rock	Yes	No	No	Himself	Episode: "100"	
2012	Electric City	Yes	Yes	Screenwriter	Cleveland Carr	Web series; voice role	
2013	Killing Lincoln	No	No	Narrator	—N/a	Television film	
2013	Toy Story of Terror!	Yes	No	No	Sheriff Woody	Halloween special; voice role	
2013	The Assassination of President Kennedy	No	Executive	No	—N/a	Documentary	
2014–2017	Last Week Tonight with John Oliver	Yes	No	No	Himself	2 episodes (Note: Appeared in two episodes: "The Lottery" (2014) and "Presidency of Donald Trump" (2017))	
2014	The Sixties	No	Executive	No	—N/a	Documentary series	
2014	Olive Kitteridge	No	Executive	No	—N/a	Miniseries	
2014	The Greatest Event in Television History	Yes	No	No	Himself	Episode: "Bosom Buddies"	
2014	Toy Story That Time Forgot	Yes	No	No	Sheriff Woody	Christmas special; voice role	
2015	The Seventies	No	Executive	No	—N/a	Documentary series	
2016	88th Academy Awards	Yes	No	No	Sheriff Woody	Television special; voice role	
2016	The Eighties	No	Executive	No	—N/a	Documentary series	
2016	Maya & Marty	Yes	No	No	Gene the Astronaut	Episode: "Jimmy Fallon & Miley Cyrus"	
2017	The Nineties	No	Executive	No	—N/a	Documentary series	
2017	The David S. Pumpkins Animated Halloween Special	Yes	No	No	David S. Pumpkins	Television special; voice role	
2018	1968: The Year That Changed America	No	Executive	No	—N/a	Documentary series	
2018	The 2000s	No	Executive	No	—N/a	Documentary series	
2019	The Movies	No	Executive	No	—N/a	Documentary series	
2020	Big City Greens	Yes	No	No	Himself	Episode: "Cheap Show"; voice role	
2020	A Christmas Special From Carrie Underwood	No	Executive	No	—N/a	Television special	
2021	1883	Yes	No	No	George Meade	Episode: "Behind Us, A Cliff"	
2022	Norman Lear: 100 Years of Music & Laughter	Yes	No	No	Himself	Television special	
2023	The 2010s	No	Executive	No	—N/a	Documentary series	
2024	Masters of the Air	No	Executive	No	—N/a	Miniseries	
2024	The Bloody Hundredth	No	Executive	Narrator	—N/a	Documentary film	
2024	The Simpsons	Yes	No	No	Himself	Episode: "Bart's Birthday"; voice role	
2025–present	The Americas	No	Executive	Narrator	—N/a	Documentary series	
2025	The American Revolution	Yes	No	No	Various roles	Documentary series; voice role	
2025	Carrie Underwood: Reflection	No	Executive	No	—N/a	Television special	
2025	Billy Joel: And So It Goes	No	Executive	No	—N/a	Documentary series	
2026	World War II with Tom Hanks	No	Executive	Narrator	—N/a	Documentary series	
2026	The American Experiment	No	Executive	No	—N/a	Documentary series	

== Theatre ==
Hanks as Callimaco in The Mandrake (1979), Riverside Shakespeare Theater

Year	Title	Role	Theatre	Notes
1977	The Taming of the Shrew	Grumio	Lakewood Civic Auditorium	
1977	Hamlet	Soldier, Reynaldo	Lakewood Civic Auditorium	
1978	Polly	Hacker	Lakewood Civic Auditorium	
1978	The Two Gentlemen of Verona	Proteus	Lakewood Civic Auditorium	
1978	The Wild Oats	Muz	Lakewood Civic Auditorium	
1978	King John	Robert Faulconbridge	Lakewood Civic Auditorium	
1979	Twelfth Night	Fabian	Lakewood Civic Auditorium	
1979	Juno and the Paycock	Jerry Devine	Lakewood Civic Auditorium	
1979	Do Me a Favorite	Harold	Lakewood Civic Auditorium	
1979	The Mandrake	Callimaco	Riverside Shakespeare Theater	
2013	Lucky Guy	Mike McAlary	Broadhurst Theatre, Broadway	
2018	Henry IV	Sir John Falstaff	Shakespeare Center of Los Angeles	
2025	This World of Tomorrow	Bert Allenberry (Note: Also playwright)	The Shed, Off-Broadway	
2027	This World of Tomorrow	Bert Allenberry	Shubert Theater, Broadway	

== Music videos ==
Year	Title	Artist	Ref.
1987	"City of Crime"	Hanks and Dan Aykroyd	
2015	"I Really Like You"	Carly Rae Jepsen	
2015	"Girls Night In"	Rita Wilson	

== See also ==
- List of awards and nominations received by Tom Hanks

== Sources ==
- Bona, Damien (2002), Inside Oscar 2, New York, United States: Ballantine Books, ISBN 0-345-44970-3
