= List of awards and nominations received by Tom Hanks =

Tom Hanks awards and nominations
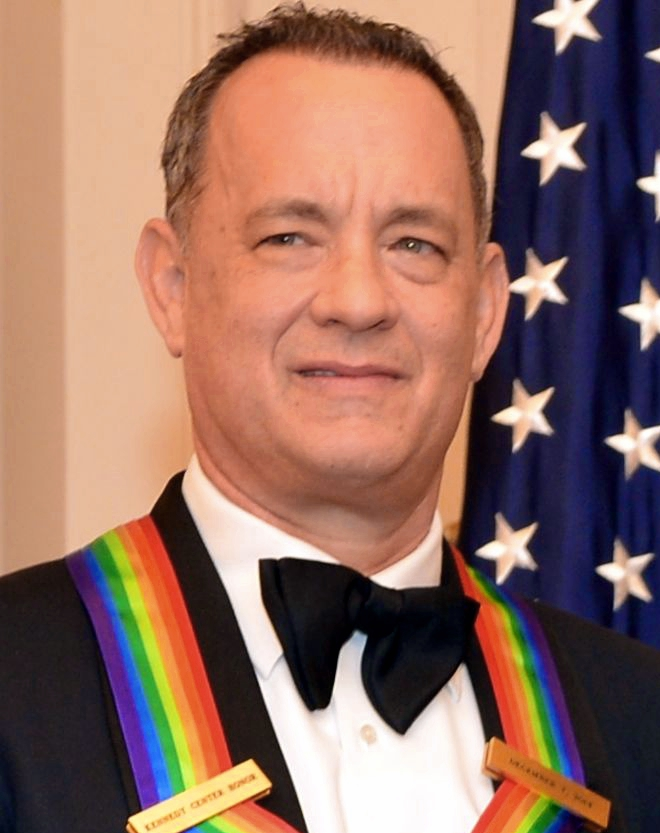
- Hanks at the Kennedy Center Honors in 2014
Awards and nominations
Award	Wins	Nominations
Academy Awards	2	6
BAFTA Awards	0	5
Emmy Awards	7	13
Golden Globes	4	10
SAG Awards	2	8
Tony Awards	0	1

Totals (Note: Certain award groups do not simply award one winner. They acknowledge several different recipients, have runners-up, and have third place. Since this is a specific recognition and is different from losing an award, runner-up mentions are considered wins in this award tally. For simplification and to avoid errors, each award in this list has been presumed to have had a prior nomination.)
- Wins: 53
- Nominations: 138

Actor, director, producer, and screenwriter Tom Hanks has been honored with numerous awards and nominations, including two consecutive Academy Awards for Best Actor for playing a lawyer suffering with AIDS in Philadelphia (1993) and the title role in Forrest Gump (1994). He is one of two actors to receive them consecutively, the other being Spencer Tracy. Tom Hanks has won a total of 50 awards on this list. He has received the AFI Life Achievement Award in 2002. He received the Stanley Kubrick Britannia Award for Excellence in Film from the British Academy of Film and Television Arts in 2004. In 2014, he received a Kennedy Center Honor, and in 2016, he received a Presidential Medal of Freedom from President Barack Obama, as well as the French Legion of Honor. In 2020, he received the Golden Globe Cecil B. DeMille Award.

Hanks made his starring film debut in Ron Howard's romantic comedy Splash (1984). During the eighties he starred in various comedies including Bachelor Party (1984), The Money Pit (1986), Nothing in Common (1986), Dragnet (1987), The 'Burbs (1989), and Turner & Hooch (1989). He made his breakthrough with in Penny Marshall's Big (1988) for which he earned an Academy Award for Best Actor nomination. Hanks' soon became known as a romantic leading man with his films with Meg Ryan, Joe Versus the Volcano (1990), Sleepless in Seattle (1993), and You've Got Mail (1999). In 1996, he directed the comedy That Thing You Do! (1996). He also is known for voicing Sheriff Woody in the Toy Story franchise.

During the 1990s he excelled in critically acclaimed dramas such as Penny Marshall's A League of Their Own (1992), Jonathan Demme's Philadelphia (1993), Robert Zemeckis' Forrest Gump (1994), Ron Howard's Apollo 13 (1995), Steven Spielberg's Saving Private Ryan (1998), and Frank Darabont's The Green Mile (1999). Since the turn of the 21st century, Hanks' continued working in dramatic films, including Cast Away (2000), Road to Perdition (2002), Catch Me If You Can (2002), The Terminal (2004), Charlie Wilson's War (2007), Cloud Atlas (2012), Captain Philips (2013), Saving Mr. Banks (2013), Bridge of Spies (2015), Sully (2016), The Post (2017), A Beautiful Day in the Neighborhood (2019), Greyhound (2020), and News of the World (2020). He also starred in The Da Vinci Code (2005), Angels & Demons (2009), and Inferno (2015).

He is also known for his work as a producer and director on various television series including From the Earth to the Moon (1998), Band of Brothers (2005), John Adams (2008), and The Pacific (2009). For his work in television he has earned seven Primetime Emmy Award wins. He is also known for his work on stage having trained as a Shakespearean Actor acting in productions at the Lakewood Civic Auditorium from 1977 to 1979. In 2013, he made his Broadway debut in Nora Ephron's Lucky Guy earning a Tony Award for Best Actor in a Play nomination.

== Major associations ==
=== Academy Awards ===
Year	Category	Nominated work	Result	Ref.
1989	Best Actor	Big	Nominated	
1994	Best Actor	Philadelphia	Won	
1995	Best Actor	Forrest Gump	Won	
1999	Best Actor	Saving Private Ryan	Nominated	
2001	Best Actor	Cast Away	Nominated	
2020	Best Supporting Actor	A Beautiful Day in the Neighborhood	Nominated	

=== BAFTA Awards ===
Year	Category	Nominated work	Result	Ref.
British Academy Film Awards
1995	Best Actor in a Leading Role	Forrest Gump	Nominated	
1999	Best Actor in a Leading Role	Saving Private Ryan	Nominated	
2001	Best Actor in a Leading Role	Cast Away	Nominated	
2014	Best Actor in a Leading Role	Captain Phillips	Nominated	
2020	Best Actor in a Supporting Role	A Beautiful Day in the Neighborhood	Nominated	
BAFTA Los Angeles Britannia Awards
2002	Stanley Kubrick Britannia Award		Won	

=== Critics' Choice Awards ===
Critics' Choice Movie Awards
Year	Category	Nominated work	Result	Ref.
2014	Best Actor	Captain Phillips	Nominated	
2016	Best Actor	Sully	Nominated	
2018	Best Actor	The Post	Nominated	
2020	Best Supporting Actor	A Beautiful Day in the Neighborhood	Nominated	
2021	Best Actor	News of the World	Nominated	
Critics' Choice Super Awards
2021	Best Actor in an Action Movie	Greyhound	Nominated	
2022	Best Actor in a Science Fiction/Fantasy Movie	Finch	Nominated	

=== Emmy Awards ===
Primetime Emmy Awards
Year	Category	Nominated work	Result	Ref.
1998	Outstanding Directing for a Miniseries or a Movie	From the Earth to the Moon	Nominated	
1998	Outstanding Miniseries	From the Earth to the Moon	Won	
2002	Outstanding Miniseries	Band of Brothers	Won	
2002	Outstanding Directing for a Miniseries, Movie or a Dramatic Special	Band of Brothers	Won	
2002	Outstanding Writing for a Miniseries, Movie or a Dramatic Special	Band of Brothers	Nominated	
2002	Outstanding Non-Fiction Special (Informational)	We Stand Alone Together	Nominated	
2008	Outstanding Miniseries	John Adams	Won	
2009	Outstanding Drama Series	Big Love ( "Season 3")	Nominated	
2010	Outstanding Variety, Music or Comedy Special	The 25th Anniversary Rock and Roll Hall of Fame Concert	Nominated	
2010	Outstanding Miniseries	The Pacific	Won	
2012	Outstanding Miniseries or Movie	Game Change	Won	
2014	Outstanding Documentary or Nonfiction Special	The Sixties (episode: "The Assassination of President Kennedy")	Nominated	
2015	Outstanding Limited Series	Olive Kitteridge	Won	
2015	Outstanding Documentary or Nonfiction Series	The Sixties	Nominated	
2016	Outstanding Documentary or Nonfiction Series	The Seventies	Nominated	
2017	Outstanding Guest Actor in a Comedy Series	Saturday Night Live (episode: "Tom Hanks/Lady Gaga")	Nominated	
2021	Outstanding Variety Special (Live)	Celebrating America	Nominated	
2025	Outstanding Narrator	The Americas (episode: "The Andes")	Nominated	

=== Golden Globe Awards ===
Year	Category	Nominated work	Result	Ref.
1989	Best Actor in a Motion Picture – Musical or Comedy	Big	Won	
1994	Best Actor in a Motion Picture – Musical or Comedy	Sleepless in Seattle	Nominated	
1994	Best Actor in a Motion Picture – Drama	Philadelphia	Won	
1995	Best Actor in a Motion Picture – Drama	Forrest Gump	Won	
1999	Best Actor in a Motion Picture – Drama	Saving Private Ryan	Nominated	
2001	Best Actor in a Motion Picture – Drama	Cast Away	Won	
2008	Best Actor in a Motion Picture – Musical or Comedy	Charlie Wilson's War	Nominated	
2014	Best Actor in a Motion Picture – Drama	Captain Phillips	Nominated	
2018	Best Actor in a Motion Picture – Drama	The Post	Nominated	
2020	Best Supporting Actor – Motion Picture	A Beautiful Day in the Neighborhood	Nominated	
2020	Cecil B. DeMille Award		Recipient	

=== Screen Actors Guild Awards ===
Year	Category	Nominated work	Result	Ref.
1995	Outstanding Male Actor in a Leading Role	Forrest Gump	Won	
1996	Outstanding Cast in a Motion Picture	Apollo 13	Won	
1999	Outstanding Male Actor in a Leading Role	Saving Private Ryan	Nominated	
1999	Outstanding Cast in a Motion Picture	Saving Private Ryan	Nominated	
2000	Outstanding Cast in a Motion Picture	The Green Mile	Nominated	
2001	Outstanding Male Actor in a Leading Role	Cast Away	Nominated	
2014	Outstanding Male Actor in a Leading Role	Captain Phillips	Nominated	
2020	Outstanding Male Actor in a Supporting Role	A Beautiful Day in the Neighborhood	Nominated	

=== Tony Awards ===
Year	Category	Nominated work	Result	Ref.
2013	Best Leading Actor in a Play	Lucky Guy	Nominated	

== Critics awards ==
Organizations	Year	Category	Work	Result	Ref.
Chicago Film Critics Association	1993	Best Actor	Philadelphia	Nominated	
Chicago Film Critics Association	1994	Best Actor	Forrest Gump	Won	
Chicago Film Critics Association	1998	Best Actor	Saving Private Ryan	Nominated	
Chicago Film Critics Association	2000	Best Actor	Cast Away	Won	
Cleveland Critics Circle	1978	Best Actor	The Two Gentlemen of Verona	Won	
Detroit Film Critics Society	2013	Best Actor	Captain Phillips	Nominated	
London Film Critics' Circle	1998	Best Actor	Saving Private Ryan	Nominated	
London Film Critics' Circle	2013	Best Actor	Captain Phillips	Nominated	
London Film Critics' Circle	2013	Best Supporting Actor	Saving Mr. Banks	Nominated	
Online Film Critics Society	1998	Best Actor	Saving Private Ryan	Nominated	
Online Film Critics Society	2000	Best Actor	Cast Away	Won	
Online Film Critics Society	2013	Best Actor	Captain Phillips	Nominated	
San Diego Film Critics Society	2013	Best Actor	Captain Phillips	Nominated	
St. Louis Gateway Film Critics Association	2013	Best Scene	Captain Phillips	Nominated	
St. Louis Gateway Film Critics Association	2016	Best Actor	Sully	Nominated	

== Miscellaneous awards ==
Organizations	Year	Category	Work	Result	Ref.
American Film Institute	1998	TV Program of the Year	Saving Private Ryan	Nominated	
American Film Institute	2001	TV Program of the Year	Band of Brothers	Won	
American Film Institute	2002	Life Achievement Award		Won	
American Comedy Awards	1987	Funniest Actor in a Motion Picture (Leading Role)	Nothing in Common	Nominated	
American Comedy Awards	1989	Funniest Actor in a Motion Picture (Leading Role)	Big	Won	
American Comedy Awards	1993	Funniest Supporting Actor in a Motion Picture	A League of Their Own	Won	
American Comedy Awards	1995	Funniest Actor in a Motion Picture (Leading Role)	Forrest Gump	Won	
American Comedy Awards	1999	Funniest Actor in a Motion Picture (Leading Role)	You've Got Mail	Nominated	
AACTA Awards	2014	Best International Lead Actor – Cinema	Captain Phillips	Nominated	
Annie Award	1995	Voice Acting in a Feature	Toy Story	Nominated	
Bambi Award	2004	Best Film – International	The Polar Express	Won	
Berlin International Film Festival	1994	Silver Bear for Best Actor	Philadelphia	Won	
Blockbuster Entertainment Awards	1996	Favorite Actor — Drama	Apollo 13	Won	
David di Donatello Award	1994	Best Foreign Actor	Forrest Gump	Nominated	
Empire Awards	1999	Best Actor	Saving Private Ryan	Won	
Empire Awards	2003	Best Actor	Road to Perdition	Nominated	
Empire Awards	2014	Best Actor	Captain Phillips	Nominated	
Golden Raspberry Award	2022	Worst Actor	Pinocchio	Nominated	
Golden Raspberry Award	2022	Worst Supporting Actor	Elvis	Won	
Golden Raspberry Award	2022	Worst Screen Combo	Elvis	Won	
Hollywood Film Awards	2002	Hollywood Actor Award	Road to Perdition	Won	
Hollywood Film Awards	2016	Hollywood Actor Award	Sully	Won	
Jupiter Award	1994	Best International Actor	Forrest Gump	Won	
Jupiter Award	2002	Best International Actor	Cast Away	Won	
Jupiter Award	2016	Best International Actor	A Hologram for the King	Nominated	
Satellite Awards	2002	Best Actor in Motion Picture	Road to Perdition	Nominated	
Satellite Awards	2013	Best Actor in Motion Picture	Captain Phillips	Nominated	
Satellite Awards	2013	Best Supporting Actor in a Motion Picture	Saving Mr. Banks	Nominated	
Satellite Awards	2016	Best Actor in Motion Picture	Sully	Nominated	
Saturn Awards	1988	Best Actor	Big	Won	
Saturn Awards	1994	Best Actor	Forrest Gump	Nominated	
MTV Movie Awards	1993	Best Kiss (with Pauline Brailsford)	A League of Their Own	Nominated	
MTV Movie Awards	1994	Best On-Screen Duo (with Meg Ryan)	Sleepless in Seattle	Nominated	
MTV Movie Awards	1994	Best Male Performance	Philadelphia	Won	
MTV Movie Awards	1994	Best On-Screen Duo (with Denzel Washington)	Philadelphia	Nominated	
MTV Movie Awards	1995	Best Male Performance	Forrest Gump	Nominated	
MTV Movie Awards	1996	Best Male Performance	Apollo 13	Nominated	
MTV Movie Awards	1996	Best On-Screen Duo (with Tim Allen)	Toy Story	Nominated	
MTV Movie Awards	1998	Best Action Sequence	Saving Private Ryan	Nominated	
MTV Movie Awards	1998	Best Male Performance	Saving Private Ryan	Nominated	
MTV Movie Awards	2001	Best On-Screen Duo (with Tim Allen)	Toy Story 2	Nominated	
MTV Movie Awards	2001	Best Kiss (with Helen Hunt)	Cast Away	Nominated	
MTV Movie Awards	2001	Best Male Performance	Cast Away	Nominated	
MTV Movie Awards	2001	Best On-Screen Duo (with Wilson the Volleyball)	Cast Away	Nominated	
Kids' Choice Awards	1996	Favorite Movie Actor	Apollo 13	Nominated	
Kids' Choice Awards	2000	Favorite Voice from an Animated Movie	Toy Story 2	Nominated	
Kids' Choice Awards	2011	Favorite Voice from an Animated Movie	Toy Story 3	Nominated	
Kids' Choice Awards	2020	Favorite Voice from an Animated Movie	Toy Story 4	Nominated	
Kids' Choice Awards	2026	Favorite Voice from an Animated Movie	Toy Story 5	Nominated	
Kids' Choice Awards	2026	Favorite On-Screen Duo/Trio (with Tim Allen and Joan Cusack)	Toy Story 5	Nominated	
National Board of Review	1994	Best Actor	Forrest Gump	Won	
National Board of Review	2017	Best Actor	The Post	Won	
People's Choice Awards	1995	Favorite Actor in a Dramatic Motion Picture	Forrest Gump	Won	
People's Choice Awards	1996	Favorite Actor in a Dramatic Motion Picture	Apollo 13	Won	
People's Choice Awards	1996	Favorite Motion Picture Actor	—N/a	Won	
People's Choice Awards	1998	Favorite Motion Picture Actor	—N/a	Nominated	
People's Choice Awards	1999	Favorite Motion Picture Actor	—N/a	Won	
People's Choice Awards	2001	Favorite Motion Picture Actor	—N/a	Won	
People's Choice Awards	2001	Favorite Motion Picture Star in a Drama	Cast Away	Won	
People's Choice Awards	2004	Favorite All-Time Entertainer	—N/a	Won	
People's Choice Awards	2005	Favorite Male Motion Picture Star	—N/a	Nominated	
People's Choice Awards	2007	Favorite Male Movie Star	—N/a	Nominated	
People's Choice Awards	2012	Favorite Movie Icon	—N/a	Nominated	
People's Choice Awards	2017	Favorite Dramatic Movie Actor	Sully	Won	
People's Choice Awards	2017	Favorite Movie Actor	Sully	Nominated	
People's Choice Awards	2017	Favorite Movie Icon	—N/a	Nominated	
Producers Guild of America Awards	2011	Outstanding Producer of Long-Form Television (as executive producer)	The Pacific	Won	
Producers Guild of America Awards	2011	Lifetime Achievement Award in Television		Won	
Producers Guild of America Awards	2013	Outstanding Producer of Long-Form Television (as executive producer)	Game Change	Won	
Teen Choice Award	2000	Choice Movie Chemistry (with Wilson the Volleyball)	Cast Away	Won	
Palm Springs International Film Festival	2014	Chairman's Vanguard Award	Captain Phillips	Won	
Palm Springs International Film Festival	2016	Icon Award		Won	

== Honorary awards ==
Organizations	Year	Award	Result	Ref.
Hollywood Walk of Fame	1992	Inductee	Honored	
Navy Distinguished Public Service Award	1999	Medal	Honored	
AFI Life Achievement Award	2002	Statue	Honored	
Douglas S. Morrow Public Outreach Award	2006	Statue	Honored	
Kennedy Center Honors	2014	Medallion	Honored	
Presidential Medal of Freedom	2016	Medal	Honored	
French Legion of Honor	2016	Medal	Honored	
Golden Globe Cecil B. DeMille Award	2020	Award	Honored	
Harvard University	2023	Degree	Honored	
Sylvanus Thayer Award from the West Point alumni association	2025	Award	Honored	

== See also ==
- List of Tom Hanks performances
