= 2000s (disambiguation) =

The 2000s are the decade from January 1, 2000 to December 31, 2009.

2000s may also refer to:

- The century from 1 January 2000 to 31 December 2099, almost synonymous with the 21st century (2001–2100)
- The millennium from 1 January 2000 to 31 December 2999, almost synonymous with the 3rd millennium (2001–3000)
- The 2000s (miniseries), a CNN documentary regarding events that occurred in the 2000s

== See also ==
- 2000 (number)
