= The 2010s (miniseries) =

- Genre: Television documentary
- Theme music composer: Blake Neely
- Composer: Nathaniel Blume
- Country of origin: United States
- No. of seasons: 1
- No. of episodes: 7

Production
- Executive producers: Tom Hanks; Gary Goetzman; Mark Herzog
- Producers: Michael Goetzman; Jane E. Russell
- Editor: Brett Jacobsen
- Running time: 60 minutes
- Production companies: CNN; Playtone; Herzog & Company

Original release
- Network: CNN
- Release: May 7 – July 2, 2023

Related
- The Sixties; The Seventies; The Eighties; The Nineties; The 2000s The Movies

The 2010s is a documentary miniseries which premiered on May 7, 2023, on CNN. Produced by Tom Hanks and Gary Goetzman's studio Playtone, the 7-part series chronicles events and popular culture of the United States during the 2010s. It serves as the final installment of the "Decades Series", following The Sixties, The Seventies, The Eighties, The Nineties, and The 2000s. The first episode, "Peak TV", was screened at SeriesFest. The last episode was not about the 2010s at all and instead featured events during the year 2020 and was titled "2020: The Year That Changed Everything".

== Episodes ==
No.	Title	Original release date	U.S. viewers (millions)
1	"Peak TV"	May 7, 2023	0.304
This 2-hour opening episode covers television in the United States during the 2010s, including The Walking Dead, Breaking Bad and its spinoff Better Call Saul, HBO's Game of Thrones, comedies such as Master of None and Fleabag, and the rise of streaming platforms such as Netflix and its original series including Orange Is the New Black and Stranger Things.
2	"Music on Demand"	May 14, 2023	0.351
An overview into the major trends in popular music during the 2010s coinciding with the rise of streaming platforms such as Spotify and Apple Music, the popularity of viral music videos (i.e. "Harlem Shake" and "Gangnam Style"), and the shift from electronic dance music to more intimate stylings by decade's end.
3	"Obama: Legacy on the Line"	May 21, 2023	0.280
An overview of the presidency of Barack Obama, the rise of the Tea Party movement, frequent mass gun violence including Sandy Hook Elementary and the Charleston church shooting, the Syrian civil war and rise of ISIS, the Russian annexation of Crimea, and the political seismic shifts of the Republican Party and the Democratic Party.
4	"Trump: The Disrupter"	May 28, 2023	0.356
An overview of Donald Trump's political rise during the 2016 presidential primaries, his upset victory over Hillary Clinton, and his presidency marking such events as the Mueller special counsel investigation, the judicial appointments of Neil Gorsuch and Brett Kavanaugh, the first impeachment, and the 2018–2019 federal government shutdown. Note: this episode is dedicated to the memory of Michael Gerson
5	"Taking It to the Streets"	June 11, 2023	0.377
An overview into the new era of political activism, marking a decade of increased polarization and societal change through movements like Occupy Wall Street, Black Lives Matter, #MeToo, and the rise of the Alt-right.
6	"The Social Media Boom"	June 18, 2023	0.274
An exploration of social media's growing influence with platforms like Facebook, Instagram, Twitter and TikTok as well as their influence on major societal events and movements, such as the Arab Spring, Gamergate, the Rohingya genocide, and Qanon.
7	"2020: The Year That Changed Everything"	July 2, 2023	N/A
An overview into the year 2020, marking such events as the second impeachment of Donald Trump, the COVID-19 pandemic, the George Floyd protests, and the 2020 United States presidential election.

Preceded by The Movies	The 2010s	Succeeded by Decades in Sports
