= The Nineties (miniseries) =

CNN miniseries

- Genre: Television documentary
- Theme music composer: Blake Neely
- Composer: Nathaniel Blume
- Country of origin: United States
- Original language: English
- No. of seasons: 1
- No. of episodes: 7

Production
- Executive producers: Tom Hanks; Gary Goetzman; Mark Herzog
- Producers: Alex Fleming; Laurens Grant; Talleah Bridges McMahon
- Cinematography: Jack Kney; Niles Harrison
- Editor: Stacy Goldate
- Running time: 60 minutes
- Production companies: CNN; Playtone; Herzog & Company

Original release
- Network: CNN
- Release: July 9 – August 20, 2017

Related
- The Sixties; The Seventies; The Eighties; The 2000s The Movies; The 2010s

The Nineties is a documentary miniseries which premiered on July 9, 2017, on CNN. Produced by Tom Hanks and Gary Goetzman's studio Playtone, the 7-part series chronicles events and popular culture of the United States during the 1990s. It serves as a follow-up to the predecessors The Sixties, The Seventies, and The Eighties. CNN greenlit the series in May 2016. One of the episodes, "Isn't It Ironic?", was screened at SeriesFest.

CNN subsequently greenlit two more Playtone/Herzog miniseries for 2018: The 2000s, as well a four-part series premiering over Memorial Day weekend, 1968: The Year That Changed America.

== Episodes ==
No.	Title	Original release date	U.S. viewers (millions)
1	"The One About TV"	July 9, 2017	1.14
Television of the 1990s, including evolutions in dramas and sitcoms, growing competition in late night comedy, the increasing representation of African Americans on TV, and the increasing prominence of cable and premium television.
2	"Clinton: The Comeback Kid"	July 16, 2017	0.968
The presidency of Bill Clinton, including his accomplishments and the Clinton–Lewinsky scandal.
3	"Can We All Get Along?"	July 23, 2017	0.861
Social issues in the 1990s, including the Los Angeles riots, the O. J. Simpson murder case, the Crown Heights riot, and the Clarence Thomas nomination hearing.
4	"New World Order"	July 30, 2017	0.950
International politics in the 1990s, including the Gulf War, the dismantling of the Soviet Union, and the 1992 U.S. presidential election.
5	"Terrorism Hits Home"	August 6, 2017	1.003
Terrorism in the United States during the 1990s, including the World Trade Center bombing, the Unabomber, the Centennial Olympic Park bombing, the Oklahoma City bombing, the Columbine High School shooting, and the rise of Osama bin Laden.
6	"The Information Age"	August 13, 2017	1.041
The mainstream adoption of the internet; the browser wars and Microsoft's antitrust case; the fall and resurgence of Apple; dot-com companies, including Amazon and eBay; Y2K.
7	"Isn't it Ironic?"	August 20, 2017	0.952
Music of the 1990s, including Nirvana and the rise of grunge, Lollapalooza, alternative rock and post-grunge, modern country pop including Garth Brooks, female rock performers such as Alanis Morissette and Sheryl Crow, Lilith Fair, gangsta rap, electronica, the emergence of girl groups and boy bands.

== Production ==
CNN announced the production of The Nineties on May 18, 2016, serving as a follow-up to The Eighties.

Preceded by The Eighties	The Nineties	Next: The 2000s
