= The Eighties (miniseries) =

2016 American documentary TV series

- Genre: Television documentary
- Theme music composer: Blake Neely
- Composer: Nathaniel Blume
- Country of origin: United States
- Original language: English
- No. of seasons: 1
- No. of episodes: 7

Production
- Executive producers: Tom Hanks; Gary Goetzman; Mark Herzog
- Producers: Simon Brown; Katie A. King; P.G. Morgan
- Cinematography: Jack Kney
- Editor: Inbal B. Lessner
- Running time: 60 minutes
- Production companies: CNN; Playtone; Herzog & Company

Original release
- Network: CNN
- Release: March 31 – June 30, 2016

Related
- The Sixties; The Seventies; The Nineties; The 2000s The Movies; The 2010s

The Eighties is a documentary miniseries which premiered on CNN on March 31, 2016. Produced by Tom Hanks and Gary Goetzman's studio Playtone, it serves as a follow-up to the predecessors The Sixties and The Seventies with a 7-part series chronicling events and popular culture of the United States during the 1980s. In May 2016, CNN greenlit an 8-part follow-up titled The Nineties, which premiered in 2017.

== Episodes ==
The series encountered numerous interruptions during subsequent broadcasts due to CNN's coverage of news events including the death of Prince and the political campaign of Donald Trump, which caused some episodes to be shown out of order from the original plan.

No.	Title	Original release date	Other release date (due to interruptions)	Viewers (millions)
1	"Raised on Television"	March 31, 2016	March 31, 2016	1.415
Television advancements in the 1980s, including the increasing diversity, the rise of celebrity- and tabloid-oriented series, and the launches of CNN, Fox, and MTV.
2	"The Reagan Revolution"	April 7, 2016	April 7, 2016	N/A
The presidency of Ronald Reagan.
3	"The Fight Against AIDS"	April 14, 2016	June 9, 2016	N/A
A mysterious virus that led to a pandemic with enormous political and cultural consequences in the 1980s.
4	"Tear Down This Wall"	April 21, 2016	April 28, 2016	N/A
The events that led to the end of the Cold War.
5	"Technology Gets Personal"	April 28, 2016	June 30, 2016	N/A
Technological developments and advancements during the 1980s, including PCs, VCRs, and video games, as well as technology that didn't take off.
6	"Greed Is Good"	May 5, 2016	May 12, 2016	N/A
Wall Street corruption, Reaganomics, junk bonds, and bailouts that led to greed and wild excess in the 1980s.
7	"Video Killed the Radio Star"	May 12, 2016	May 26, 2016	N/A
The evolution of music and notable musicians in the 1980s, including the advent of music videos, CDs, and the Second British Invasion.

== Production ==
CNN announced the production of The Eighties on May 13, 2015, before the premiere of their preceding miniseries The Seventies on June 11.

Preceded by The Seventies	The Eighties	Next: The Nineties
