= The Seventies (miniseries) =

- Genre: Television documentary
- Country of origin: United States
- Original language: English
- No. of seasons: 1
- No. of episodes: 8

Production
- Executive producers: Tom Hanks; Gary Goetzman; Mark Herzog
- Running time: 60 minutes
- Production companies: CNN; Playtone; Herzog & Company

Original release
- Network: CNN
- Release: June 11 – August 13, 2015

Related
- The Sixties; The Eighties; The Nineties; The 2000s The Movies; The 2010s

The Seventies is a documentary miniseries which premiered on CNN on June 11, 2015. Produced by Tom Hanks and Gary Goetzman' studio Playtone, and serving as a follow-up to The Sixties, the 8-part series chronicled events and popular culture of the United States during the 1970s.

In February 2016, CNN announced that it would premiere a third installment in the franchise, The Eighties, on March 31, 2016.

== Episodes ==
No.	Title	Original release date	US viewers (millions)
1	"Television Gets Real"	June 11, 2015	0.887
Television of the 1970s, including new series reflecting and satirizing current issues (such as All in the Family and Saturday Night Live), new formats, Monday Night Football, etc.
2	"United States vs. Nixon"	June 18, 2015	0.901
The presidency of Richard Nixon, including the Watergate Scandal and his resignation.
3	"Peace with Honor"	June 25, 2015	0.770
The United States' exit from the Vietnam War.
4	"Crimes and Cults"	July 9, 2015	0.681
Notable crimes of the 1970s, including Charles Manson, John Wayne Gacy, the Son of Sam murders, and the Zodiac Killer.
5	"The State of the Union Is Not Good"	July 16, 2015	0.882
America went from bad to worse as the country dealt from one crisis to the next throughout the 1970s.
6	"Battle of the Sexes"	July 23, 2015	0.742
The feminist and LGBT rights movements in the United States during the 1970s.
7	"Terrorism at Home and Abroad"	July 30, 2015	0.709
Terrorism in the 1970s, from TWA Flight 841 to the Munich Olympic Massacre.
8	"What's Goin' On"	August 13, 2015	0.837
American popular music exploded into new formats and artists found new ways to express themselves, from Blondie to Billy Joel to KISS.

== Production ==
CNN announced the production of the miniseries The Seventies on November 20, 2014, serving as a continuation of their previous documentary miniseries The Sixties.

Preceded by The Sixties	The Seventies	Next: The Eighties
