= Gary Goetzman =

American film and television producer (born 1952)

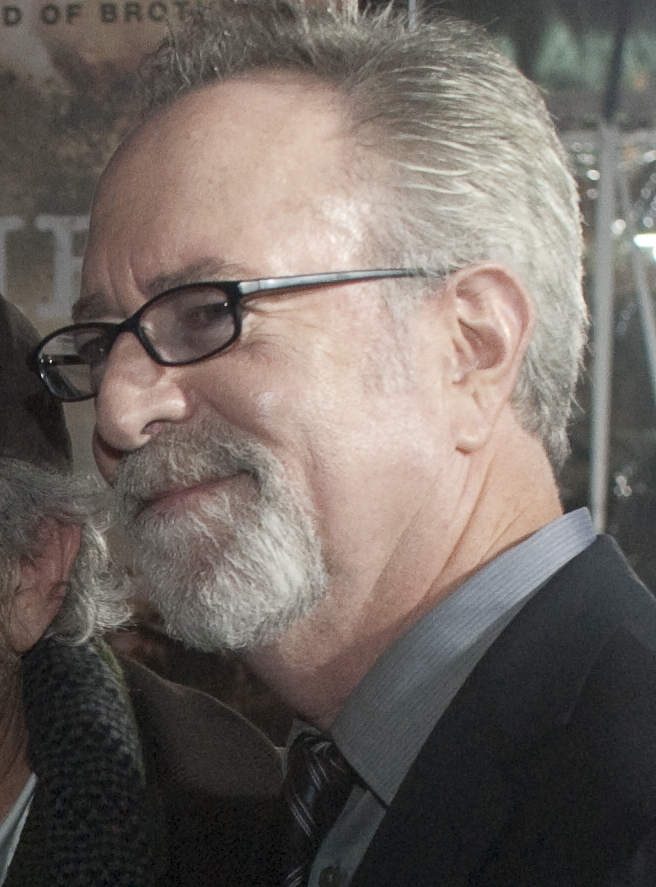
- Goetzman in 2010
- Born: Gary Michael Goetzman; November 6, 1952 (age 73); Los Angeles, California, U.S.
- Occupations: Producer; actor
- Years active: 1967–present
- Spouse: Leslie Anne Carroll (m. 1986)
- Children: 2

Gary Michael Goetzman (/ˈɡɛtsmən/ GETS-mən; born November 6, 1952) is an American film and television producer and actor, and co-founder of the production company Playtone with actor Tom Hanks.

== Life and career ==
Born in Los Angeles, Goetzman began his career as a child actor. He had starred in the film Yours, Mine and Ours with Lucille Ball, appeared on The Ed Sullivan Show, and eventually started a waterbed company and a pinball arcade. Goetzman at one time delivered a waterbed to Jon Peters's home. His exploits as a performer and a salesman inspired his friend Paul Thomas Anderson's 2021 film Licorice Pizza.

In 1984, he produced the Talking Heads concert film Stop Making Sense with director Jonathan Demme. That initiated a successful run as a music supervisor, on such films as Something Wild, Colors, Modern Girls, and Married to the Mob; among many others. In 1991, producer Goetzman and director Demme again collaborated to make The Silence of the Lambs, that won the top five Academy Awards including Best Picture.

In 1993, Goetzman was executive producer of Demme's Philadelphia, starring Tom Hanks, beginning a working relationship with Hanks. Goetzman co-produced Hanks's 1996 directorial debut, That Thing You Do! The two then co-founded Playtone in 1997, which supplanted Hanks' earlier Clavius Base production label. Since then, Goetzman has produced hit films including My Big Fat Greek Wedding, The Polar Express, Charlie Wilson's War, and Mamma Mia! Goetzman has also received several Emmy Awards for HBO mini-series Band of Brothers, The Pacific, John Adams, Game Change, and Olive Kitteridge.

Aside from producing films, Goetzman has been known to play small parts in movies he is connected to.

He has also enjoyed a successful parallel career as a music composer and producer, working with such artists as Smokey Robinson, Natalie Cole, Jane Child, Thelma Houston, and The Staples Singers.

He currently sits on the National board of directors for the Producers Guild of America.

Goetzman is executive producer (with Tom Hanks and Mark Herzog) of the CNN exclusive documentary miniseries The Sixties (2014), The Seventies (2015), The Eighties (2016), and The Nineties (2017).

== Filmography ==
He was a producer in all films unless otherwise noted.

=== Film ===
Producer

- Modern Girls (1986)
- Miami Blues (1990)
- Amos & Andrew (1993)
- Devil in a Blue Dress (1995)
- That Thing You Do! (1996)
- Beloved (1998)
- My Big Fat Greek Wedding (2002)
- The Polar Express (2004)
- The Ant Bully (2006)
- Starter for 10 (2006)
- Charlie Wilson's War (2007)
- The Great Buck Howard (2008)
- Mamma Mia! (2008)
- City of Ember (2008)
- Where the Wild Things Are (2009)
- Larry Crowne (2011)
- Parkland (2013)
- Ricki and the Flash (2015)
- My Big Fat Greek Wedding 2 (2016)
- A Hologram for the King (2016)
- The Circle (2017)
- Mamma Mia! Here We Go Again (2018)
- Greyhound (2020)
- News of the World (2020)
- A Man Called Otto (2022)
- My Big Fat Greek Wedding 3 (2023)

Executive producer

- The Silence of the Lambs (1991)
- Philadelphia (1993)
- Evan Almighty (2007)
- My Life in Ruins (2009)
- Ithaca (2015)

As an actor

Year	Film	Role	Notes
1967	Divorce American Style	Jonathan Harmon	
1968	Yours, Mine and Ours	Greg Beardsley	
1974	Caged Heat	Sparky	Uncredited
1977	Handle with Care	RV Salesman	
1979	Last Embrace	Tour Guide	
1980	Melvin and Howard	Melvin's Cousin Fred	
1981	The Incredible Shrinking Woman	Newscaster	
1981	Bustin' Loose	Store Manager	
1984	Swing Shift	'Swing Shift' Bandleader	
1986	Modern Girls	Undercover Cop	
1986	Something Wild	Guido Paonessa	
1988	And God Created Woman	Al Lawrence	
1988	Married to the Mob	The Guy at the Piano	
1990	Miami Blues	Hotel Desk Clerk	
1991	The Silence of the Lambs	Guido Paonessa	Uncredited
1993	Family Prayers	Irate Driver	
1993	Philadelphia	Guido Paonessa	

Music department

Year	Film	Role
1982	Jinxed!	Radio source music
1984	Swing Shift	Lyricist: Additional original songs
1986	Something Wild	Musical consultant
1988	And God Created Woman	Music supervisor
1988	Colors	Music consultant
1988	Married to the Mob	Music supervisor
1988	The Prince of Pennsylvania	Music supervisor
1989	Lost Angels	Music supervisor
1989	Scenes from the Class Struggle in Beverly Hills	Music supervisor
1989	Little Monsters	Music supervisor
1990	A Shock to the System	Music supervisor
1990	Catchfire	Music supervisor
1990	The Hot Spot	Music supervisor
1990	Reversal of Fortune	Music supervisor
1991	Queens Logic	Music supervisor
1991	Point Break	Music supervisor
1991	Until the End of the World	Music supervisor
1992	Freejack	Music supervisor

Soundtrack

Year	Film	Role
1984	Heavenly Bodies	Producer: "At Last You're Mine"
1985	Police Academy 2: Their First Assignment	Producer: "Temporary Insanity" Writer: "Dirty Work"
1985	Just One of the Guys	Writer: "Gone Too Far"
1985	Fright Night	Producer: "Boppin' Tonight" Writer: "Boppin' Tonight"
1986	Thrashin'	Producer: "Don't Think Twice" "Dancin' in Jamaica" Writer: "Arrow Through My Heart" "Dancin' in Jamaica"
1986	Something Wild	Lead vocal: "Before the Next Teardrop Falls"
1988	Dominick and Eugene	Writer: "Game of Love" "Lucky at Love"
1990	Miami Blues	Writer: "Island Blues" "Floatin'"
1993	Philadelphia	Performer: "All the Way"
1996	That Thing You Do!	Writer: "Mr. Downtown" "Voyage Around the Moon" "Hold My Hand, Hold My Heart" "Will You Marry Me?"
2000	Big Momma's House	Writer: "Radio"

Production manager

Year	Film	Role
1974	Caged Heat	Unit manager

Thanks

Year	Film	Role
1991	Straight Out of Brooklyn	Thanks
1991	Fires Within	Special thanks
2002	The Truth About Charlie	Very special thanks
2005	The Wedding Date	Thanks
2008	Surfer, Dude	Very special thanks
2009	I Hate Valentine's Day	Special thanks
2014	Inherent Vice	Thank you
2018	Hotel Artemis	Special thanks
2019	A Beautiful Day in the Neighborhood	The producers wish to thank
2021	Licorice Pizza	Special thanks

=== Television ===
Year	Title	Credit	Notes
2000	West Point	Executive producer	
2001	Band of Brothers	Co-executive producer	
2001	We Stand Alone Together	Co-executive producer	Television special
2006	We're with the Band	Executive producer	Television special
2007	Big Love: In the Beginning	Executive producer	
2008	John Adams	Executive producer	
2008	David McCullough: Painting with Words		Television special
2009	25th Anniversary Rock and Roll Hall of Fame Concerts	Executive producer	Television special
2010	The Pacific	Executive producer	
2006−11	Big Love	Executive producer	
2011	The 3 Minute Talk Show	Executive producer	
2012	Game Change	Executive producer	Television film
2012	The 2012 Rock and Roll Hall of Fame Induction Ceremony	Executive producer	Television special
2012	Electric City	Executive producer	
2013	The 2013 Rock and Roll Hall of Fame Induction Ceremony	Executive producer	Television special
2013	The Assassination of President Kennedy	Executive producer	Documentary
2014	The Sixties	Executive producer	Documentary
2014	Olive Kitteridge	Executive producer	
2014	The Concert for Valor	Executive producer	Television special
2015	The Seventies	Executive producer	Documentary
2016	The 2016 Rock and Roll Hall of Fame Induction Ceremony	Co-executive producer	Television special
2016	The Eighties	Executive producer	Documentary
2017	The 2017 Rock and Roll Hall of Fame Induction Ceremony	Executive producer	Television special
2017	The Nineties	Executive producer	Documentary
2018	Notes from the Field	Executive producer	Television film
2018	The 2018 Rock and Roll Hall of Fame Induction Ceremony	Executive producer	Television special
2018	1968: The Year That Changed America	Executive producer	Documentary
2018	The 2000s	Executive producer	Documentary
2019	The 2019 Rock and Roll Hall of Fame Induction Ceremony	Executive producer	Television special
2019	The Movies	Executive producer	Documentary
2020	My Gift: A Christmas Special from Carrie Underwood	Executive producer	Television special
2022	'Tis the Season: The Holidays on Screen	Executive producer	Documentary
2023	The 2010s	Executive producer	Documentary
2024	Masters of the Air	Executive producer	

As an actor

Year	Title	Role	Notes
1965	McHale's Navy	Tonio	
1979	Hot Rod	Security Guard	Television film
1978−80	Family	Steven / Sam	
2012	Electric City	—N/a	

Soundtrack

Year	Title	Role
1984	Kidd Video	Writer: "Video Romeo"

Miscellaneous crew

Year	Title	Role	Notes
2014	The Concert for Valor	Tribute film executive producer	Television special
2023	A Grammy Salute to the Beach Boys	For: Tom Hanks	Television special

Thanks

Year	Title	Role	Notes
2012	POV	Special thanks	
2021	A Night in the Academy Museum	Filmmaker acknowledgement	Television special
