= The Sixties (miniseries) =

- Genre: Television documentary
- Country of origin: United States
- Original language: English
- No. of seasons: 1
- No. of episodes: 10

Production
- Executive producers: Tom Hanks; Gary Goetzman; Mark Herzog
- Running time: 60 minutes
- Production companies: CNN; Playtone; Herzog & Company

Original release
- Network: CNN
- Release: May 29 – August 14, 2014

Related
- The Seventies; The Eighties; The Nineties; The 2000s The Movies; The 2010s

The Sixties is a documentary miniseries which premiered on CNN on May 29, 2014.

== Overview ==
Produced by Tom Hanks and Gary Goetzman's studio Playtone, the 10-part series chronicled events and popular culture of the United States during the 1960s.

== Episodes ==
No.	Title	Original release date	U.S. viewers (millions)
1	"Television Comes of Age"	May 29, 2014	0.946
Major events and milestones that lead to the changing landscape of television in the 1960s, including The Twilight Zone, The Fugitive, The Dick Van Dyke Show, and I Dream of Jeannie.
2	"The World on the Brink"	June 5, 2014	0.866
Events of the Cold War in the 1960s, including the Bay of Pigs Invasion and the Cuban Missile Crisis.
3	"The Assassination of President Kennedy"	June 13, 2014	0.765
The events surrounding the assassination of John F. Kennedy, including an examination of the 1964 Warren report and interviews with eyewitnesses.
4	"The War in Vietnam"	June 19, 2014	0.872
The start of the Vietnam War and the role Lyndon B. Johnson played in it.
5	"A Long March to Freedom"	June 26, 2014	0.751
Key moments in the Civil Rights Movement, including the March on Washington, lunch counter sit-ins, Freedom Rides, Freedom Summer, Integration of schools, and the Children's Crusade.
6	"The British Invasion"	July 10, 2014	0.914
British musical groups and recording artists, such as the Beatles, that had an influence in the 1960s on American music.
7	"The Space Race"	July 24, 2014	0.583
The beginning of Space exploration and competition between the United States and the Soviet Union to be the first to land on the Moon.
8	"1968"	July 31, 2014	0.797
Dramatic events of 1968, including the Soviet incursion into Czechoslovakia, assassinations, developments in the Southeast Asia wars, the end of the Johnson administration, violence at the 1968 Democratic National Convention and Richard Nixon's election.
9	"The Times They Are A-Changin'"	August 7, 2014	0.903
The counterculture and social movements of the 1960s, including civil rights, feminism, gay liberation, and environmentalism.
10	"Sex, Drugs, and Rock 'N' Roll"	August 14, 2014	0.921
The evolution of rock music in the 1960s.

== Production ==
=== Development ===
In 2013, CNN president Jeff Zucker came up with the concept of The Sixties from conversations about "the forthcoming anniversary of JFK’s assassination, The Beatles, and the civil rights movement". Inspiration for the series also came to Zucker after being impressed with the National Geographic historical television film Killing Lincoln, which included Mark Herzog as one of the executive producers. Upon the announcement of the series by Variety on September 17, 2013, Vinnie Malhotra, senior vice president of development and acquisition in CNN, stated that they were "looking at [The Sixties] as a major television event." With the inception of the project coming within a year of Zucker's appointment as president of CNN, Zucker also stated to Variety that "Projects like this are emblematic of exactly the type of programming that we need more of, signifying a new direction and expanded sensibility at CNN."

=== Release ===
Although The Sixties premiered in May 2014, the third episode, "The Assassination of President Kennedy", was previously released as its own television special on November 14, 2013, to coincide with the 50th anniversary of John F. Kennedy's assassination.

== Reception ==
=== Viewership ===
The premiere of The Sixties was a ratings success for CNN; it was seen by 1.39 million total viewers, finishing in between Fox News Channel and MSNBC in total viewership, and beating its rivals in key demographic audience share.

== Spin-offs ==
CNN has since commissioned follow-ups covering later decades, including The Seventies (2015), The Eighties (2016), The Nineties (2017), The 2000s (2018), and The 2010s (2023). In 2018, Playtone, which recounted the events of 1968 as episode 8 in this series, revisited the year in more detail in the four-part series 1968: The Year That Changed America.

The Sixties	Next: The Seventies
