= The 2000s (miniseries) =

- Genre: Television documentary
- Theme music composer: Blake Neely
- Composer: Nathaniel Blume
- Country of origin: United States
- No. of seasons: 1
- No. of episodes: 7

Production
- Executive producers: Tom Hanks; Gary Goetzman; Mark Herzog
- Producers: Alex Fleming; Michael Goetzman; Patrick Roscoe; Gina Scarlata
- Cinematography: Jack Kney
- Editor: Jason Hardwick
- Running time: 60 minutes
- Production companies: CNN; Playtone; Herzog & Company

Original release
- Network: CNN
- Release: July 8 – August 19, 2018

Related
- The Sixties; The Seventies; The Eighties; The Nineties; The Movies; The 2010s

The 2000s is a documentary miniseries which premiered on July 8, 2018, on CNN. Produced by Tom Hanks and Gary Goetzman's studio Playtone, the 7-part series chronicles events and popular culture of the United States during the 2000s. It serves as a follow-up to the predecessors The Sixties, The Seventies, The Eighties, and The Nineties. CNN greenlit the series in May 2016.

== Episodes ==
| No. | Title | Original release date | U.S. viewers (millions) |
|---|---|---|---|
| 1 | "The Platinum Age of Television" | July 8, 2018 | 0.835 |
Television in the United States during the 2000s, including HBO's The Sopranos, Six Feet Under and Entourage, reality television, mockumentary-style sitcoms such as The Office, the creative renaissance, Dexter, and AMC's notable entries into original programming with Mad Men and Breaking Bad.
| 2 | "Mission Accomplished" | July 15, 2018 | 0.675 |
The election of George W. Bush, Terrorism in the United States during the 2000s, including the September 11 attacks and the launch of the war on terror.
| 3 | "Quagmire: Bush's Second Term" | July 22, 2018 | 0.736 |
George W. Bush's second term as president, including the Iraqi insurgency, Hurricane Katrina, and the incoming Great Recession.
| 4 | "The I Decade" | July 29, 2018 | 0.684 |
Technology in the 2000s, including the Dot-com bubble, the rise of Google, Apple's further growth, smartphones, "Web 2.0" services, and social networks such as Friendster, Myspace, YouTube, and Facebook.
| 5 | "The Financial Crisis" | August 5, 2018 | 0.638 |
The Great Recession in the United States.
| 6 | "Yes We Can" | August 12, 2018 | 0.789 |
The presidential campaign and election of Barack Obama.
| 7 | "I Want My MP3" | August 19, 2018 | 0.692 |
Music of the 2000s, the shift to digital distribution.

| Preceded by The Nineties | The 2000s | Next: The Movies |
