= List of Netflix original films (2019) =

Netflix is an American global on-demand Internet streaming media provider, that has distributed a number of original programs, including original series, specials, miniseries, documentaries and films. Netflix's original films also include content that was first screened on cinematic release in other countries or given exclusive broadcast in other territories, and is then described as Netflix original content.

== Feature films ==
Title	Release date	Genre	Runtime	Language
Lionheart	January 4, 2019	Drama	1 h 34 min	English
The Last Laugh	January 11, 2019	Comedy	1 h 38 min	English
IO	January 18, 2019	Science fiction	1 h 36 min	English
Soni	January 18, 2019	Crime drama	1 h 37 min	Hindi
Polar	January 25, 2019	Action	1 h 58 min	English
Velvet Buzzsaw	February 1, 2019	Dark comedy horror	1 h 52 min	English
High Flying Bird	February 8, 2019	Sports-drama	1 h 30 min	English
Firebrand	February 22, 2019	Drama	1 h 56 min	Marathi
Paris Is Us	February 22, 2019	Romance drama	1 h 24 min	French
Paddleton	February 22, 2019	Comedy drama	1 h 29 min	English
Walk. Ride. Rodeo.	March 8, 2019	Biopic	1 h 39 min	English
Juanita	March 8, 2019	Drama	1 h 30 min	English
Triple Frontier	March 13, 2019	Action-adventure	2 h 5 min	English
Altered Carbon: Resleeved	March 19, 2020	Anime/Science fiction	1 h 14 min	Japanese
The Dirt	March 22, 2019	Biographical comedy	1 h 48 min	English
The Highwaymen	March 29, 2019	Crime drama	2 h 12 min	English
15 August	March 29, 2019	Comedy drama	2 h 4 min	Marathi
Unicorn Store	April 5, 2019	Comedy drama	1 h 31 min	English
Who Would You Take to a Deserted Island?	April 12, 2019	Drama	1 h 33 min	Spanish
The Perfect Date	April 12, 2019	Teen romantic comedy	1 h 30 min	English
Someone Great	April 19, 2019	Romantic comedy	1 h 32 min	English
Music Teacher	April 19, 2019	Drama	1 h 41 min	Hindi
Despite Everything	May 3, 2019	Comedy	1 h 18 min	Spanish
The Last Summer	May 3, 2019	Teen romantic comedy	1 h 49 min	English
Wine Country	May 10, 2019	Comedy	1 h 43 min	English
Good Sam	May 16, 2019	Drama	1 h 30 min	English
See You Yesterday	May 17, 2019	Science fiction	1 h 27 min	English
Rim of the World	May 24, 2019	Science fiction adventure	1 h 39 min	English
The Perfection	May 24, 2019	Horror thriller	1 h 30 min	English
Always Be My Maybe	May 31, 2019	Romantic comedy	1 h 42 min	English
Chopsticks	May 31, 2019	Comedy	1 h 40 min	Hindi
Elisa & Marcela	June 7, 2019	Biographical romance	1 h 58 min	Spanish
Murder Mystery	June 14, 2019	Comedy mystery	1 h 37 min	English
Beats	June 19, 2019	Coming-of-age drama	1 h 50 min	English
Point Blank	July 12, 2019	Action	1 h 26 min	English
Secret Obsession	July 18, 2019	Thriller	1 h 37 min	English
The Red Sea Diving Resort	July 31, 2019	Spy thriller	2 h 10 min	English
Otherhood	August 2, 2019	Comedy	1 h 40 min	English
Jaoon Kahan Bata Ae Dil	August 9, 2019	Romantic drama	1 h 46 min	Hindi
Invader Zim: Enter the Florpus	August 16, 2019	Animation / Science fiction	1 h 11 min	English
Sextuplets	August 16, 2019	Comedy	1 h 39 min	English
Falling Inn Love	August 29, 2019	Romantic comedy	1 h 38 min	English
Back to School	August 30, 2019	Comedy	1 h 23 min	French
Tall Girl	September 13, 2019	Teen comedy drama	1 h 42 min	English
Between Two Ferns: The Movie	September 20, 2019	Comedy	1 h 22 min	English
In the Shadow of the Moon	September 27, 2019	Science fiction thriller	1 h 55 min	English
In the Tall Grass	October 4, 2019	Horror	1 h 41 min	English
El Camino: A Breaking Bad Movie	October 11, 2019	Crime drama	2 h 2 min	English
Fractured	October 11, 2019	Thriller	1 h 40 min	English
The Forest of Love	October 11, 2019	Crime thriller	2 h 31 min	Japanese
Street Flow	October 12, 2019	Drama	1 h 36 min	French
Eli	October 18, 2019	Horror	1 h 38 min	English
Seventeen	October 18, 2019	Coming-of-age comedy drama	1 h 39 min	Spanish
The Laundromat	October 18, 2019	Biographical comedy drama	1 h 36 min	English
Upstarts	October 18, 2019	Comedy drama	1 h 52 min	Hindi
Dolemite Is My Name	October 25, 2019	Biopic	1 h 58 min	English
Rattlesnake	October 25, 2019	Horror	1 h 25 min	English
The King	November 1, 2019	Historical drama	2 h 20 min	English
American Son	November 1, 2019	Drama	1 h 30 min	English
Drive	November 1, 2019	Action	1 h 59 min	Hindi
Holiday in the Wild	November 1, 2019	Christmas adventure-romance	1 h 26 min	English
Let It Snow	November 8, 2019	Christmas romantic comedy	1 h 33 min	English
Earthquake Bird	November 15, 2019	Thriller	1 h 46 min	English
House Arrest	November 15, 2019	Comedy	1 h 44 min	Hindi
Klaus	November 15, 2019	Animation / Christmas / Comedy / Adventure	1 h 38 min	English
The Knight Before Christmas	November 21, 2019	Christmas romantic comedy	1 h 32 min	English
The Irishman	November 27, 2019	Crime drama	3 h 29 min	English
Holiday Rush	November 28, 2019	Christmas-family	1 h 34 min	English
Dead Kids	December 1, 2019	Thriller	1 h 34 min	Filipino
A Christmas Prince: The Royal Baby	December 5, 2019	Christmas romantic comedy	1 h 25 min	English
Marriage Story	December 6, 2019	Drama	2 h 16 min	English
6 Underground	December 13, 2019	Action	2 h 8 min	English
The Two Popes	December 20, 2019	Biographical drama	2 h 5 min	English
Como caído del cielo	December 24, 2019	Comedy	1 h 57 min	Spanish
The App	December 26, 2019	Science fiction drama	1 h 19 min	Italian

== Documentaries ==
Title	Release date	Runtime	Language
ReMastered: Massacre at the Stadium	January 11, 2019	1 h 4 min	English
Fyre: The Greatest Party That Never Happened	January 18, 2019	1 h 37 min	English
ReMastered: The Two Killings of Sam Cooke	February 8, 2019	1 h 4 min	English
Period. End of Sentence.	February 12, 2019	26 min	Hindi
Antoine Griezmann: The Making of a Legend	March 21, 2019	1 h	French
ReMastered: The Miami Showband Massacre	March 22, 2019	1 h 10 min	English
The Legend of Cocaine Island	March 29, 2019	1 h 27 min	English
Homecoming: A Film by Beyoncé	April 17, 2019	2 h 17 min	English
Brené Brown: The Call to Courage	April 19, 2019	1 h 16 min	English
Grass Is Greener	April 20, 2019	1 h 37 min	English
ReMastered: Devil at the Crossroads	April 26, 2019	48 min	English
Knock Down the House	May 1, 2019	1 h 27 min	English
All in My Family	May 3, 2019	39 min	English
ReMastered: The Lion's Share	May 17, 2019	1 h 24 min	English
A Tale of Two Kitchens	May 22, 2019	30 min	Spanish
After Maria	May 24, 2019	37 min	Spanish
The Black Godfather	June 7, 2019	1 h 58 min	English
Rolling Thunder Revue: A Bob Dylan Story by Martin Scorsese	June 12, 2019	2 h 22 min	English
Life Overtakes Me	June 14, 2019	40 min	English
The Edge of Democracy	June 19, 2019	2 h 1 min	Portuguese
Parchis: The Documentary	July 10, 2019	1 h 46 min	Spanish
The Great Hack	July 24, 2019	1 h 54 min	English
Enter the Anime	August 5, 2019	58 min	English
American Factory	August 21, 2019	1 h 50 min	English
Travis Scott: Look Mom I Can Fly	August 28, 2019	1 h 25 min	English
Evelyn	September 10, 2019	1 h 36 min	English
Hello, Privilege. It's Me, Chelsea	September 13, 2019	1 h 4 min	English
Los Tigres del Norte at Folsom Prison	September 15, 2019	1 h 4 min	Spanish
Birders	September 25, 2019	37 min	Spanish
Ghosts of Sugar Land	October 16, 2019	21 min	English
Tell Me Who I Am	October 18, 2019	1 h 25 min	English
Dancing with the Birds	October 23, 2019	51 min	English
It Takes a Lunatic	October 25, 2019	2 h 6 min	English
A 3 Minute Hug	October 28, 2019	28 min	Spanish
Fire in Paradise	November 1, 2019	39 min	English
Bikram: Yogi, Guru, Predator	November 20, 2019	1 h 26 min	English
Lorena, Light-Footed Woman	November 20, 2019	28 min	Spanish
After the Raid	December 19, 2019	25 min	Spanish
El Pepe: A Supreme Life	December 27, 2019	1 h 13 min	Spanish

== Specials ==
These programs are one-time original events or supplementary content related to original films.

Title	Release date	Genre	Runtime	Language
Kevin Hart's Guide to Black History	February 8, 2019	Variety show	1 h 3 min	English
Still Laugh-In: The Stars Celebrate	May 14, 2019	Variety show	1 h	English
The Lonely Island Presents: The Unauthorized Bash Brothers Experience	May 23, 2019	Comedy / Musical	30 min	English
Frankenstein's Monster's Monster, Frankenstein	July 16, 2019	Mockumentary	32 min	English
Rocko's Modern Life: Static Cling	August 9, 2019	Animation / Comedy	45 min	English
Sturgill Simpson Presents: Sound & Fury	September 27, 2019	Animation / Musical	41 min	English
The Irishman: In Conversation	November 27, 2019	Aftershow / Interview	23 min	English
Porta dos Fundos: The First Temptation of Christ	December 3, 2019	Comedy	46 min	Portuguese
John Mulaney & the Sack Lunch Bunch	December 24, 2019	Variety show	1 h 10 min	English

== Shorts ==
These are programs that have a runtime of less than 20 minutes.

Title	Release date	Genre	Runtime	Language
Anima	June 27, 2019	Musical	15 min	English
American Factory: A Conversation with the Obamas	August 21, 2019	Aftershow / Interview	10 min	English
Little Miss Sumo	October 28, 2019	Documentary	19 min	Japanese
The Road to El Camino: A Breaking Bad Movie	October 29, 2019	Making-of	13 min	English
