= 41st News and Documentary Emmy Awards =

41st News & Documentary Emmy Awards
- Date: September 21, 2020 (News Categories); September 22, 2020 (Documentary Categories)
- Location: Virtual

Television/radio coverage
- Network: Watch.TheEmmys.TV

The 41st News & Documentary Emmy Awards were presented by the National Academy of Television Arts and Sciences (NATAS), honoring the best in American news and documentary programming in 2019. The winners were announced on two ceremonies via live-stream at Watch.TheEmmys.TV and other apps associated, the winners for the News categories were announced on September 21, 2020, while the ones for the Documentary categories were revealed on September 22, 2020.

The nominees were announced on August 6, 2020 for both the News and the Documentary categories.

== Winners and nominees ==
The nominees were announced on August 6, 2020. Winners in each category are listed first, in boldface.

=== News programming ===
Outstanding Coverage of a Breaking News Story in a Newscast	Outstanding Coverage of a Breaking News Story in a Newsmagazine
**New Day ("Roger Stone raid") (CNN)**; ABC World News Tonight with David Muir ("California Burning") (ABC); ABC World News Tonight with David Muir ("Shooting in El Paso") (ABC); ABC World News Tonight with David Muir and Nightline ("The Sri Lanka Massacre") (ABC); PBS NewsHour ("Why the Caliphate’s fall is a ‘milestone’ but not the end for ISIS") (PBS); Today ("Mass shootings in America") (NBC)	**The Weekly ("El Chapo's Son: The Siege of Culiacán") (FX Networks)**; 60 Minutes ("Hong Kong") (CBS); 60 Minutes ("The Impeachment Debate and The Impeachment Inquiry") (CBS); Dateline NBC ("The Disappearance of Jennifer Dulos") (NBC); Vice News ("Bringing Down Baghdadi") (Vice TV)
Outstanding Continuing Coverage of a News Story in a Newscast	Outstanding Continuing Coverage of a News Story in a Newsmagazine
**VICE News Tonight ("Collapse of the Caliphate") (HBO)**; PBS NewsHour ("Inside the Honduran Migrant Crisis") (PBS); VICE News Tonight ("Cross-Border Crackdown") (HBO); VICE News Tonight ("Enduring Maduro: Life in Venezuela") (HBO); VICE News Tonight ("Hong Kong Revolts") (HBO)	**FRONTLINE in association with The Associated Press ("Kids Caught in the Crackdown") (PBS)**; Dateline NBC ("Life Inside") (NBC); FRONTLINE ("Targeting Yemen") (PBS); The Weekly ("Baby Constantin") (FX Networks); The Weekly ("Connecting the World") (FX Networks)
Outstanding Feature Story in a Newscast	Outstanding Feature Story in a Newsmagazine
**CBS Sunday Morning ("What Price?") (CBS)**; CBS Sunday Morning ("Alec's Mission") (CBS); CBS Sunday Morning ("The Real Green Book") (CBS); Nightline ("Mexico: The Disappeared") (ABC); VICE News Tonight ("What It’s Like to Have a Second-Trimester Abortion") (HBO)	**The Weekly ("The Gallagher Attack") (FX Networks)**; 60 Minutes ("Nadia") (CBS); ABC News ("The Dropout") (ABC); Freedom Fighters (Reveal from The Center for Investigative Reporting); Real Sports with Bryant Gumbel ("Love & Basketball: The Elena Delle Donne Story") (HBO)
Outstanding Investigative Report in a Newscast	Outstanding Investigative Report in a Newsmagazine
**The Situation Room with Wolf Blitzer ("Putin's Private Army") (CNN)**; **VICE News Tonight ("They Come For Us At Night: China's Vanishing Muslims") (HBO)**; ABC World News Tonight with David Muir and Nightline ("Vanished: China's Missing Muslims") (ABC); CNN International Desk and Amanpour ("Fear and Oppression in Xinjiang") (CNN); The Situation Room with Wolf Blitzer ("Made in America, Lost in Yemen") (CNN)	**FRONTLINE in collaboration with BBC Arabic ("Iraq's Secret Sex Trade") (PBS)**; 60 Minutes ("The Label") (CBS); Fault Lines ("In Bad Faith") (Al Jazeera International USA); FRONTLINE in collaboration with NPR ("Coal's Deadly Dust") (PBS); Unsafe Factories in Bangladesh Are Supplying Amazon Sellers (The Wall Street Journal)
Outstanding Hard News Feature Story in a Newscast	Outstanding Breaking News Coverage
**Today ("‘Zone Rouge’: An Army of Children Toils in African Mines") (NBC)**; CBS This Morning ("R. Kelly Breaks His Silence") (CBS); 'It's Mutilation': The Police in Chile AreBlinding Protesters (The New York Times); Made in China, Exported to the World: TheSurveillance State (The New York Times); PBS NewsHour ("The Opaque Operations Involved in Fighting the Taliban") (PBS)	**Turkey's Incursion into Syria (CNN)**; A Deadly Weekend in America (CNN); Hong Kong Protesters Storm LegCo (CNN); Hurricane Dorian Hitsthe Bahamas (CNN); Sri Lanka Easter Bombings (CNN)
Outstanding Live Interview	Outstanding Edited Interview
**Amanpour ("U.S. Secretary of Defense Mark Esper Interviewed by Christiane Amanpour") (CNN)**; AC360 ("Anderson Cooper Interviews Facebook's Monika Bickert") (CNN); Amanpour ("Christiane Amanpour Interviews Adel al-Jubeir, Saudi Arabian Minister of State for Foreign Affairs") (CNN); The Beat with Ari Melber ("Mueller Witnesses Interview") (MSNBC); Today ("Nikki Haley Live in Studio 1A") (NBC)	**Oprah Winfrey Presents: When They See Us Now (Netflix)**; 60 Minutes ("Crown Prince Muhammad bin Salman") (CBS); 60 Minutes ("Investigating the President") (CBS); 60 Minutes ("Know My Name") (CBS); Dateline NBC ("Reckoning") (NBC); Real America with Jorge Ramos ("Interview with a Dictator") (Univision)
Outstanding News Special	Outstanding News Discussion and Analysis
**CBS Sunday Morning ("A Sunday Morning in Florence") (CBS)**; 20/20 ("Screen Time") (ABC); CNN Special Report ("Abuse and Scandal in the Catholic Church: The Case of the Predator Priest") (CNN); CNN Special Report ("The Fall: The Final Days of the Caliphate") (CNN); Justice For All Town Hall (MSNBC)	**Black Women OWN the Conversation ("Motherhood") (OWN)**; All In with Chris Hayes ("All In America: Live at the Border") (MSNBC); All In with Chris Hayes ("Climate in Crisis") (MSNBC); Meet the Press ("Special Edition: Alternative Facts"); PBS NewsHour ("The Mueller Report, Explained") (PBS)
Outstanding News Analysis: Editorial and Opinion	Outstanding Science, Medical and Environmental Report
**New Day Weekend ("'Infested, 'He Says") (CNN)**; A Message from the Future With Alexandria Ocasio-Cortez (The Intercept); Equal Play (The New York Times); Real America with Jorge Ramos ("Detained by a Dictator") (Univision); The Rachel Maddow Show ("Tiller and Beyond: Abortion Wars in Kansas") (MSNBC)	**PBS NewsHour ("Stopping A Killer Pandemic") (PBS)**; CNN Special Report ("A Toxic Tale - Trump’s Environmental Impact") (CNN); Fault Lines ("Sick Inside: Death and Neglect in U.S. Jails") (Al Jazeera International USA); Nightline ("Journey to the Edge") (ABC); PBS NewsHour ("Warnings from Antarctica") (PBS)
Outstanding Arts, Culture or Entertainment Report	Outstanding Business, Consumer or Economic Report
**60 Minutes ("Mark Bradford") (CBS)**; 60 Minutes ("The Lost Music") (CBS); PBS NewsHour ("Making Her Own Sound: Redefining Who Can Be a Musician") (PBS); Real Sports with Bryant Gumbel ("On the Basis of Sex: Girls' Baseball in America") (HBO); VICE News Tonight ("A Dose of Humanity in Virtual Reality") (HBO); VICE News Tonight ("Nobody Wants to Die: Surviving D-Day") (HBO)	**The Lead with Jake Tapper ("Maduro's Blood Gold") (CNN)**; Fault Lines ("Recovering from Rehab") (Al Jazeera International USA); Fault Lines ("System Failure: The Boeing Crashes") (Al Jazeera International USA); Fault Lines ("Targeted by a Text") (Al Jazeera International USA); The Hidden Safety Risks of YourAmazon Order (The Wall Street Journal)

=== Programming in Spanish ===
Outstanding Newscast or Newsmagazine in Spanish	Outstanding Coverage of a Breaking News Story in Spanish
**Aquí y Ahora (Univision)**; Al Punto (Univision); Noticias Telemundo (Telemundo); Noticiero Univision (Univision); Primer Impacto (Univision)	**Barcelona Riots (CNN en Español)**; Al Punto ("Coverage of shooting in El Paso, Texas") (Univision); Aquí y Ahora ("Enigmas de las Caravanas (Enigmas of the Caravans)") (Univision); El Chapo culpable ("El Chapo" Guilty) (Telemundo); Noticiero Univision ("El Paso shooting") (Univision); Univision News Digital ("Un día con una milicia pro-Trump en la frontera") (A Day at the Border with a Pro-Trump Militia) (Univision)
Outstanding Investigative Journalism in Spanish	Outstanding Feature Story in Spanish
**Los niños perdidos de Guatemala (Lost Children of Guatemala) (Telemundo)**; Aquí y Ahora ("Buscando en el Desierto (Searching in the Desert)") (Univision); Aquí y Ahora ("Supremacistas: Las Redes del Odio (Supremacists: The Networks of Hate)") (Univision); Aquí y Ahora ("The Secrets of Trump's Housekeepers") (Univision); Caravanas (Caravans) (Discovery Networks Latin America/US Hispanic)	**CNN Digital ("No Olvidado: Death and dignity on the US border") (CNN)**; "Míster Trump, disculpe las molestias" ("Mr. Trump, Pardon the interruption") (Telemundo); Univision News Digital ("Las niñas suicidas de El Salvador") (Univision); Univision News Digital ("Las redadas nublan el futuro de los hispanos en EEUU") (Univision); Vice News Tonight – Tracking Colombia's Disappeared (HBO)
Outstanding Interview in Spanish
**Aquí y Ahora ("La Entrevista Censurada (The Censored Interview)") (Univision)**; "Trump rompe el silencio" (Trump Breaksthe Silence) (Telemundo); Al Punto ("Interview with author Mario Vargas Llosa") (Univision); Camilo ("Ophelia Pastrana") (CNN en Español); En diálogo con Longobardi ("Jesse y Joy") (CNN en Español)

=== Documentary Programming ===
Outstanding Current Affairs Documentary	Outstanding Politics and Government Documentary
**POV ("Midnight Traveler") (PBS)**; FRONTLINE ("Fire in Paradise") (PBS); FRONTLINE ("On the President's Orders") (PBS); POV ("The Distant Barking of Dogs") (PBS); Under the Wire (Starz); Unmasking Jihadi John: Anatomy of a Terrorist (HBO)	**POV ("The Silence of Others") (PBS)**; Independent Lens ("Charm City") (PBS); Independent Lens ("The Interpreters") (PBS); Knock Down the House (Netflix); XY Chelsea (Showtime
Outstanding Social Issue Documentary	Outstanding Investigative Documentary
**True Justice: Bryan Stevenson's Fightfor Equality (HBO)**; College Behind Bars (PBS); Ernie & Joe: Crisis Cops (HBO); Independent Lens ("Wrestle") (PBS); Untouchable (Hulu)	**16 Shots (Showtime)**; At the Heart of Gold: Inside the USA Gymnastics Scandal (HBO); FRONTLINE ("Flint's Deadly Water") (PBS); FRONTLINE in collaboration with The Wall Street Journal ("Predator on the Reservation") (PBS); Who Killed Malcolm X? (Fusion)
Outstanding Historical Documentary	Outstanding Arts and Culture Documentary
**Breslin and Hamill: Deadline Artists (HBO)**; 8 Days: To the Moon and Back (PBS); FRONTLINE ("Supreme Revenge") (PBS); Independent Lens ("The King") (PBS); ReMastered: Massacre at the Stadium (Netflix); Scotty and the Secret History of Hollywood (Starz)	**ReMastered: The Lion's Share (Netflix)**; An American Masters Special Presentation Toni Morrison: The Pieces I Am (VOD); Independent Lens ("Rumble: The Indians Who Rocked the World") (PBS); It's a Hard Truth Ain't It? (HBO); United Skates (HBO)
Outstanding Science and Technology Documentary	Outstanding Nature Documentary
**Going Viral: Beyond the Hot Zone (National Geographic)**; CNN Original Series ("Chasing Life with Dr. Sanjay Gupta") (CNN); Einstein and Hawking: Unlocking the Universe (Science Channel); NOVA ("The Planets") (PBS); NOVA ("The Violence Paradox") (PBS)	**Nature ("The Serengeti Rules") (PBS)**; Dancing with the Birds (Netflix); Dynasties (BBC America); Into the Canyon (National Geographic); The River and the Wall (Starz)
Outstanding Business and Economic Documentary	Outstanding Short Documentary
**The Weekly –The Myth of the Medallion (FX Networks)**; FRONTLINE ("In the Age of AI") (PBS); Independent Lens ("Made in Boise") (PBS); POV ("Farmsteaders") (PBS); Rotten (Netflix)	**The Nightcrawlers (National Geographic)**; ABC News ("1969: The FBI and the Panther") (ABC); Fire in Paradise (Netflix); Learning to Skateboard in a Warzone (if you're a girl) (A&E); Lost & Found (National Geographic); Scenes from a Dry City (Field of Vision)
Best Documentary
**POV ("The Silence of Others") (PBS)**; 16 Shots (Showtime); At the Heart of Gold: Inside the USA Gymnastics Scandal (HBO); Independent Lens ("The King") (PBS); Under the Wire (Starz)

=== Craft ===
Best Story in a Newscast	Best Story in a Newsmagazine
**VICE News Tonight ("Taken by ISIS")' (HBO)**; The Lead with Jake Tapper ("Maduro's Blood Gold") (CNN); The Russia Tapes: Health Care and Civilians Under Attack in Syria (The New York Times); The Situation Room with Wolf Blitzer ("Made in America, Lost in Yemen") (CNN); The Situation Room with Wolf Blitzer ("Putin's Private Army") (CNN); Today ("‘Zone Rouge’: An Army of Children Toils in African Mines") (NBC)	**FRONTLINE in collaboration with BBC Arabic ("Iraq's Secret Sex Trade") (PBS)**; 48 Hours ("Man on the Moon") (CBS); 60 Minutes ("Know My Name") (CBS); Fault Lines ("In Bad Faith") (Al Jazeera International USA); FRONTLINE in collaboration with NPR ("Coal's Deadly Dust") (PBS)
Outstanding New Approaches: Current News	Outstanding New Approaches: Documentary
**In El Salvador, Violence is Driving Girls to Kill Themselves (Univision News Digital/TIME)**; It's a Vast, Invisible Climate Menace. We Made It Visible (The New York Times); Newsy + Bellingcat (Newsy); See How the World’s Most Polluted Air Compares With Your City’s (The New York Times); The Russia Tapes: Health Care and Civilians Under Attack in Syria (The New York Times)	**Awavena (VR on Demand—Viveport)**; Apollo's Moonshot AR (Smithsonian Channel); Gone in a Generation (The Washington Post); Tracing Addai (The New York Times); Vox Missing Chapter ("How Florida Legally Terrorized Gay Students") (Vox); We Are Witnesses: Chicago (The Marshall Project)
Outstanding New Approaches: Arts, Lifestyle and Culture	Outstanding Cinematography: Documentary
**Where Are All the Bob Ross Paintings? We Found Them (The New York Times)**; 65 Block Parties, 5 Boroughs, 20 Photographers: See What They Found (The New York Times); Almost Famous (The New York Times); From Here to Home (The New York Times); Revenge of the Bacteria: Why We’re Losingthe War (The New York Times); Vox Earworm ("We Measured Pop Music's Falsetto Obsession") (Vox)	**Epic Yellowstone – Dawson Dunning, Jeff Reed, Rick Smith, Thomas Winston (Smithsonian Channel)**; Ghost Fleet – Basil Childers, Lucas Gath, Jeffrey Waldron, Alejandro Wilkins (VOD); Nature ("Okavango: River of Dreams - Paradise") – Dereck Joubert, Taylor Turner, Casey Anderson, Luke Barnett, James Boon, Nel Boshoff, Grant Brokensha, Luke Cormack (PBS); Nature ("The Serengeti Rules") – Tim Cragg (PBS); POV ("306 Hollywood") – Elan Bogarín, Jonathan Bogarín, Alejandro Mejía (PBS)
Outstanding Direction: News	Outstanding Video Journalism: News
**Brett Kelly/CNN Heroes: An All-Star Tribute – Directed by Brett Kelly (CNN)**; Matt Lee - Hong Kong Protests (live): Police Move in After Protesters Storm LegCo – Directed by Matt Lee (CNN); Meet the Press ("President Trump Interview") – Directed by Sarah Carlson Brooke (NBC); NBC Nightly News ("Debate Night in Miami") – Directed by Christian Alicea and Mark Greenstein (NBC); Sunday TODAY with Willie Geist ("Kara Kennedy/Deadly Mass Shootings Coverage") – Directed by Kara Kennedy (NBC)	**FRONTLINE ("Ebola in Congo") – Ben C. Solomon (PBS)**; The Weekly ("Collision") – Victor Tadashi Suarez (FX Networks); VICE News Tonight ("Inside ISIS's Final Fight") – Mikhail Galustov (HBO); VICE News Tonight ("Taken by ISIS") – Ben Foley, Zach Caldwell, Adam Desiderio, Mikhail Galustov, Javier Monzano (HBO); VICE News Tonight ("The Final Victory in the Battle Against ISIS") – Adam Desiderio, Javier Monzano (HBO)
Outstanding Editing: News	Outstanding Editing: Documentary
**The Weekly ("Collision") – David Herr, Geoff O'Brien (FX Networks)**; Revenge of the Bacteria: Why We’re Losingthe War – Kassie Bracken, Ora DeKornfeld, Elori Kramer, Emily Rhyne (The New York Times); VICE News Tonight ("Escaping the Kingdom") – Jared Perez (HBO); VICE News Tonight ("Taken by ISIS") – Robert Cosentino, Ryo Ikegami, Joe Matoske (HBO); VICE News Tonight ("They Come For Us At Night: China's Vanishing Muslims") – Paula Salhany (HBO)	**Ernie & Joe: Crisis Cops – Toby Shimin (HBO)**; Independent Lens ("Wrestle") – Pablo Proenza (PBS); Learning to Skateboard in a Warzone (if you're a girl) – Mary Manhardt (A&E); Living Undocumented – Bradley Dean, Ed Greene, Kevin Hibbard, Vincent Oresman (Netflix); ReMastered: The Miami Showband Massacre – Michelle Witten (Netflix)
Outstanding Graphic Design and Art Direction	Outstanding Music Composition
**CNN Digital ("Style Origins") (CNN)**; NOVA ("The Planets") (PBS); ReMastered: Devil at the Crossroads (Netflix); The Mind, Explained (Netflix); When Whales Walked: Journeys in Deep Time (PBS/Smithsonian Channel)	**POV ("306 Hollywood") – Troy Herion (PBS)**; An American Masters Special Presentation Toni Morrison: The Pieces I Am – Kathryn Bostic (VOD); Dancing with the Birds – David Mitcham (Netflix); Dynasties – Benji Merrison, Will Slater (BBC America); Untouchable – Anne Nikitin (Hulu)
Outstanding Lighting Direction and Scenic Design	Outstanding Sound
**America's Hidden Stories ("Mystery at Jamestown") (Smithsonian Channel)**; America's Hidden Stories ("Salem's Secrets") (Smithsonian Channel); CNN Democratic Presidential Debate: Detroit (CNN); Democratic Debate Special ("NBC News Democratic Debate") (NBC); New Day & Cuomo Prime Time (Studio 19Y) (CNN); Serial Killer: Devil Unchained (Investigation Discovery)	**Fire in Paradise – Lawrence Everson, Cindy Takehara Ferruccio, Bob Edwards, Matt Rigby (Netflix)**; College Behind Bars – Josh Berger, Marlena Grzaslewicz, Mariusz Glabinski (PBS); Dynasties – Angela Groves, Kate Hopkins, Tim Owens, Chris Domaille, Graham Wild, Dan Brown (BBC America); POV ("Grit") – Sasha Friedlander, Cynthia Wade, Mike Frank, Gede Sinu Pradnyana (PBS); The Legend of Cocaine Island – Bryan Storkel, Lawrence Everson (Netflix); XY Chelsea – Joe Fletcher, Tim Travers Hawkins, Karl Mainzer (Showtime)
Outstanding Writing	Outstanding Research
**60 Minutes ("Nadia") – Written by Rachael Morehouse, Scott Pelley (CBS)**; The Weekly ("Collision") – Written by Singeli Agnew, Dan Barry, Liz O. Baylen, Rukmini Callimachi, Liz Day, Jason Stallman (FX Networks); AC360 – Anderson Cooper Pays Tribute to his Mom, Gloria Vanderbilt – Written by Anderson Cooper, Charlie Moore (CNN); Dancing with the Birds – Written by Huw Cordey (Netflix); FRONTLINE ("Zero Tolerance") – Written by Michael Kirk (PBS)	**VICE News Tonight ("They Come For Us At Night: China's Vanishing Muslims") – Nicole Bozorgmir, Carina Wong, Isobel Yeung, Titi Yu (HBO)**; The Weekly ("The Myth of the Medallion") – Doris Burke, Emma Graves Fitzsimmons, Suzanne Hillinger, Madeline Rosenberg, Brian Rosenthal (FX Networks); 16 Shots – Alison Flowers, Jamie Kalvern (Showtime); An American Masters Special Presentation Toni Morrison: The Pieces I Am – Johanna Giebelhaus (VOD); The Green Book: Guide to Freedom – Yoruba Richen (Smithsonian Channel)
Outstanding Promotional Announcement
**Shark Week 2019 (Discovery Channel)**; FRONTLINE ("Rule The World") (PBS); Lost & Found Trailer (National Geographic); The Movies ("Anchors Campaign") (CNN); The Movies – Iconic Graphics Spot (CNN)

=== Regional News ===
Outstanding Regional News Story: Spot or Breaking News	Outstanding Regional News Story: Investigative Report
**Noticias Univision San Antonio (San Antonio, TX) – Notre Dame on Fire, Paris, France (KWEX-DT)**; News4JAX (Jacksonville, FL) – Mass Shooting at The Jacksonville Landing (WJXT-TV); WLWT Cincinnati News (Cincinnati, OH) – Fountain Square Shooting Spree (WLWT-TV); WRAL News (Raleigh, NC) – Hurricane Florence (WRAL-TV); WVLT News (Knoxville, TN) – Fire On May First (WVLT-TV)	**ABC15 News (Phoenix, AZ) – Abuse of Force (KNXV-TV)**; 11Alive News (Atlanta, GA) – The Reveal: Secrets Inside a Corrupt Police Department (WXIA-TV); 5 Eyewitness News At 10PM (Minneapolis and SaintPaul, MN) – Born Under Suspicion (KSTP-TV); CBS 2 News (Chicago, IL) – Sterigenics (WBBM-TV); Fox45 News at 10 (Baltimore, MD) – Two-Hour Diploma (WBFF-TV)

== Multiple nominations ==
Shows that received multiple nominations
Nominations	Program	Network
16	VICE News Tonight	HBO
15	FRONTLINE	PBS
11	60 Minutes	CBS
9	The Weekly	FX Networks
8	Independent Lens	PBS
8	POV	PBS
7	PBS NewsHour	PBS
6	Aquí y Ahora	Univision
6	Fault Lines	Al Jazeera International USA
5	Today	NBC
5	All In with Chris Hayes	MSNBC
4	The Situation Room with Wolf Blitzer	CNN
4	CBS Sunday Morning	CBS
4	ABC World News Tonight with David Muir	ABC
4	Nightline	ABC
3	Nature	PBS
3	NOVA	PBS
3	CNN Special Report	CNN
3	Al Punto	Univision
3	Univision News Digital	Univision
3	Dancing with the Birds	Netflix
3	Dateline NBC	NBC
3	16 Shots	Showtime
3	Toni Morrison: The Pieces I Am	VOD
3	Dynasties	BBC America
2	College Behind Bars	PBS
2	AC360	CNN
2	Amanpour	CNN
2	CNN Digital	CNN
2	The Lead with Jake Tapper	CNN
2	The Movies	CNN
2	At the Heart of Gold: Inside the USA Gymnastics Scandal	HBO
2	Ernie & Joe: Crisis Cops	HBO
2	Real Sports with Bryant Gumbel	HBO
2	Noticiero Univision	Univision
2	Real America with Jorge Ramos	Univision
2	Fire in Paradise	Netflix
2	Revenge of the Bacteria: Why We’re Losing the War	The New York Times
2	The Russia Tapes: Health Care and Civilians	The New York Times
2	Meet the Press	NBC
2	ABC News	ABC
2	XY Chelsea	Showtime
2	America's Hidden Stories	Smithsonian Channel
2	Under the Wire	Starz
2	Learning to Skateboard in a Warzone (if you're a girl)	A&E
2	Untouchable	Hulu
2	Vice News	Vice TV

Nominations by Network
Nominations	Network
48	PBS
30	CNN
27	HBO
18	Univision
17	CBS
15	Netflix
14	The New York Times
12	NBC
9	ABC
9	FX Networks
6	Al Jazeera International USA
5	MSNBC
5	National Geographic
5	Showtime
5	Smithsonian Channel
5	Telemundo
5	VOD
4	Starz
3	BBC America
3	CNN en Español
2	A&E
2	Hulu
2	Vice TV
2	Vox
2	The Wall Street Journal
