= Back to school =

Back to school may refer to:

- Back to School, a 1986 American comedy film starring Rodney Dangerfield
- Back to School (2014 film), a Peruvian comedy film
- Back to School (2019 film), a French comedy film
- "Back to School" (I Am Weasel), an episode of the animated television series I Am Weasel
- "Back to School", a song by Jon and Vangelis from their album The Friends of Mr Cairo
- "Back to School (Mini Maggit)", a song composed by the American alternative metal band Deftones
- Back to school (marketing), the period in which students purchase supplies to prepare for the school year
- "Back to School", an episode of the TV series Pocoyo

== See also ==
- Back to Skool, a 1985 video game for the ZX Spectrum computer
- First day of school, the first day that school opens after a break
