= Parchís (group) =

Spanish children's music group

Parchís was a children's musical group from Spain which enjoyed great success in the Spanish-speaking world in the 1980s. Their significance in Hispanic popular culture comes from being perceived as an archetype of this type of band at the time. Parchís' original five members were Constantino Fernández Fernández (the red pawn), Yolanda Ventura Román (the yellow pawn), Oscar Ferrer Cañadas (the blue pawn), Gemma Prat Termens (the green pawn), and David Muñoz Forcada (the rolling die, which is singular for dice). After several line-up changes, the group disbanded in 1985 with various members continuing successful careers in the world of entertainment.

The group's name is a reference to the board game parchís (an adaptation of pachisi), where each player represents a different colored pawn (red, yellow, blue, and green). In the same way, each member of the group dressed in one of these four colors with the fifth member representing the dice.

== History ==
Parchís was created in 1979, after executives from the Belter Records company placed a newspaper ad in Barcelona, asking children to attend auditions to form a musical group. At first, Belter Records intended to employ the group members during summers only; the company's executives figured out that would be the best season of the year for Parchís albums and concerts to sell.

Parchís was neither a boy or girl band. Eventually, the band expanded to have six members at the same time. Gemma Prat Termens, David Muñoz Forcada, Oscar Ferrer Cañadas, Constantino Fernández Fernández (better known as Tino), and Yolanda Ventura (daughter of the well-known trumpet player, Rudy Ventura) were the first five kids to be chosen as members of Parchís.

Tino was the heartthrob of the group; Gemma was the shy one; Yolanda was every boy's crush; Frank, who joined in 1981 after Oscar left, was the extroverted redhead; and David, a blonde-haired boy, was the best dancer and the life of the party.

Parchís' first single, "En La Armada", was a Spanish version of the Village People's disco hit, "In the Navy". "En La Armada" became a major hit in Spain, giving way for a number of important music composers to start working with Parchís. "En La Armada" was followed by what was arguably the group's biggest hit, "Durante la Espera de Parchís" ("During Parchís' Wait"). This song became a number one hit in Mexico. Later on, the group also became successful in Argentina, Colombia, Ecuador and other American countries.

Personal problems forced Oscar Ferrer Caňadas out of the band in 1981. He was substituted by Francisco Díaz Terez, known by fans simply as "Frank". Brothers Miguel Ángel Gómez Cambronero (born in Germany) and Jesús Gómez Cambronero joined the band after Tino and David left the group in 1983.

Losing Tino proved lethal to the group, however. With Menudo reaching unprecedented (for a Hispanic children's music group) success levels in Latin America as well as in Spain, and other Latin American groups like Los Chamos and Los Chicos also providing Parchís with the competition, and with Ferrer Cañadas' considerable number of fans going, Parchís began to wane.

In Spain, however, the group remained popular enough to release a 1983 movie, Parchís Entra en Acción (translated as Parchís Gets Into Action in English), alongside Alberto Fernández de Rosa.

In 1985, Parchís broke up. The group had recorded a number of albums that were successful in Spain and Latin America. More than a decade later, the group would reunite for one television show engagement.

On February 10, 2008, Parchís made an appearance on the Mexican television show "Muévete". It was the first time in 25 years that they were all together on the same stage. They were introduced and sang the song "Parchís" with everyone in attendance. Tino spoke of a comeback and wanting to sing again. They were interviewed for about one hour and spoke about their romances and adventures during their tour. They announced plans to tour again and come out with a new album. In the opening sequence, they all stood on a colored circle and the curtains came up, but there was a problem with Gemma's circled curtain that didn't come up in time, but she continued to sing. This was the highest viewed program in Mexico for the year so far.

=== Members ===
- Constantino "Tino" Fernández Fernández (born March 25, 1967, in Barcelona, Spain; Member from 1979 to 1983), the red pawn, lead vocalist, and leader of the group. He began a solo career after his time in the group, releasing three albums with little success. He later worked for Artel. During this time, he lost his left arm in a car accident in Murcia. He is currently working as a radio sports commentator in Barcelona and is married with no children.
- Yolanda Ventura (born October 21, 1968, in Barcelona, Spain; Member from 1979 to 1985), the yellow pawn, and daughter of Spanish musician Rudy Ventura. After Parchís, Yolanda began acting in television shows in Spain, before relocating to Mexico where she works exclusively for Televisa. She had a son with her first husband, actor Alejandro Aragon, and is now in a relationship with Odiseo Bichir, another actor.
- Gemma Prat Termens (born October 22, 1968, in Barcelona, Spain; member from 1979 to 1985), the green pawn. She went on to run a kindergarten in Barcelona. She is now working as a clerk and is married with a daughter.
- David Muñoz Forcada (born March 23, 1970, in Barcelona, Spain; member from 1979 to 1984), the white die, and the group's dancer. After Parchís, he went to Scotland to study economics and currently works for an advertisement company. He is married and lives in the United States.
- Óscar Ferrer Cañadas (born November 20, 1971, in Barcelona, Spain; member from 1979 to 1981), the blue pawn, and the first band member to leave. He subsequently graduated with a degree in journalism and political science, and now works as a marketing manager in a communication group. He is married.
- Francisco "Frank" Díaz Terez (born August 6, 1971, in Barcelona, Spain; member from 1981 to 1985), Oscar's replacement as the blue pawn. Frank already had experience as an advertising model before joining the group. He formed a rock band after leaving Parchís, and is now an entrepreneur, with a wife and daughter.
- Jesús "Chus" Gómez Cambronero (born May 14, 1969, in Madrid, Spain; member from 1983 to 1985), the red pawn, and Tino's replacement as the group's leader. After Parchís, he formed a band called Platón (duet) with his brother Michel.
- Miguel "Michel" Ángel Gómez Cambronero (born September 8, 1966, in Hamburg, Germany; member from 1984 to 1985), the white die, David's replacement, and the last new member to join. After Parchís, he and his brother Chus formed the group Platón in 1992.

== Discography ==
Album 1 : "Las Super 25 Canciones de Los Peques" (España - 1979)

1. Superman
2. Barbapapa Rock
3. Fantasmas a Go-Go
4. Gloria
5. La Plaga
6. Demasiado Cielo
7. Si Vas a París Papa
8. Cantando Aventuras
9. Los Cinco
10. En La Armada
11. Mi Barba
12. Hallelujah
13. El Plátano
14. Ganador
15. Me Gustas Mucho
16. Si Tuviera Un Martillo
17. Mamá Yo Quiero
18. Mortadelo y Filemón
19. La Canción de... Parchís
20. Tarzan
21. De Oca, En Oca
22. Es Tan Divertido Ayudar a Papá
23. Hooray! Hooray!
24. La de la Mochila Azul
25. Ven a Mi Casa Esta Navidad

Album 2 : "Comando G" (España - 1980)

1. Comando G (3)
2. Me Vuelvo Loco (3)
3. El Video Mató a La Estrella de la Radio (3)
4. Vamos a Bailar (3)
5. Animales, Animales, Animales
6. Ali Baba (3)
7. Un Mundo Para Ellos
8. Zark -7 (3)
9. Una Casita en Canada (3) (8)
10. Animales (8)
- Songs from the anime series "Battle of the Planets" (Science Ninja Team Gatchaman) by Tatsunoko Production

Album 3 : "La Batalla de Los Planetas" (España - 1980) (Cassette only)

1. La Batalla de Los Planetas (4) (8)
2. Me Vuelvo Loco
3. Zark-7
4. Una Casita en Canadá
5. Defensores Del Bien
6. Comando G
7. El Vídeo Mató a la Estrella de la Radio
8. Por El Deporte a la Paz
9. Alí Babá

Album 4 : "Twist Del Colegio" (España - 1980)

1. Twist Del Colegio (5)
2. Viejo Tren
3. Ratatata (8)
4. Funkytown
5. Toc-Toc-Toc
6. Tu Nombre (8)
7. Don Diablo (8)
8. La Caza Del Ratón
9. Dime Que Me Quieres
10. Érase Una Vez El Hombre (Single - Argentina 1980)
11. Cantando y a La Cama (LP “Parchís” -Argentina 1980)

Album 5 : "La Guerra de Los Niños" (España - 1980)

1. Querido Professor
2. Tema del Flaco (Instrumental)
3. Fin de Curso
4. Tema del Profesor (Instrumental)
5. Comando G (Instrumental)
6. Twist del Colegio
7. Tema de Supermán (Instrumental)
8. Ayúdale
9. Tema de Don Atilio (Instrumental)
10. Canción de Don Mati (Instrumental)

Album 6 : "Nadales" (España - 1980)

1. Fum, Fum, Fum
2. El Rabada
3. Les Dotze Van Tocant
4. El Desembre Congelat
5. El Tunc Que Tan Tunc
6. La Mare De Deu
7. Noi de la Mare El
8. Sant Josep I La Mare de Deu
9. Cascavells
10. Santa Nit
11. L'avet
12. El Demoni Escort

Album 7 : "Villancicos" (España - 1980)

1. Campana Sobre Campana
2. Los Peces en el Río
3. Navidades Blancas
4. Rin, Rin (16)
5. Dime, Niño ¿De Quién Eres?
6. Arre, Borriquito
7. Noche de Paz
8. ¡Ay! Del Chiquirritín
9. Ande, Ande, Ande
10. Jingle Bells
11. El Pequeño Tamborilero
12. Canta, Ríe y Bebe

Album 8 : "Parchís Contra el Inventor Invisible" (Argentina - 1981)

1. La Magia Del Circo (9) (11)
2. Hola Amigos (9) (13)
3. Cinco Amigos de Verdad (11)
4. Canta y Baila (9) (13) (B-SIDE “Hola Amigos” (España - 1981)

Album 9 : "Corazon de Plomo" (España - 1981)

1. Corazón de Plomo (11)
2. Un Rayo de Sol
3. Dime Por Qué
4. Vamos a Bailar un Twist
5. Me Vas a Volver Loco (12)
6. El País de la Música (12)
7. Rockabilly Rebel
8. Pequeño Amor en Buenos Aires (LP “La Super Discoteca” Argentina 1981)
9. Veo Veo (Unreleased Song “Generación 2000/Grandes Éxitos Vol. 2/ Mexico 2001)

Album 10 : "Parchís y Sus Amigos" (España - 1981)

1. El Espacio
2. Cumpleaños Feliz (12) (13)
3. Los Picapiedra
4. El Baile Del Stop
5. Que Barbaridad
6. Tintarella Di Luna
7. Vamos a Cantar (12)
8. El Baile de Los Pajaritos (12)
9. Ven a Mi Fiesta (12) (13)
10. Verdad o Mentira
11. Cuando Me Miras

ALBUM 11 : "La Segunda Guerra de Los Niños" (España - 1981)

1. Otro Curso
2. Mi Bici
3. La Chica Ideal
4. ¡Oh, Jesús!
5. Querido Walt Disney (13)
6. Nana Blanca, Nana Negra

Album 12 : "La Magia de Los Parchís" (Argentina - 1981)

1. Parchís y El Mago
2. Vamos Por Un Mundo De Colores
3. Bocadillo Stop
4. Patinbaile
5. La Superfiesta
6. El Árbol de la Sabiduría (LP “Los Parchís a Disneylandia”/ Argentina 1982)
7. Himno de Las Aguilas Del America (SINGLE /México 1982)
8. El Mundial (El Mundial 82 /España)

Album 13 : "Cumpleaños Feliz" (España - 1982)

1. Márchate Ya (14)
2. Buenos Días Arco Iris (14)
3. Hasta La Vista (14)
4. Vamos a Río
5. Meteorite Rock and Roll(14)

Album 14 : "Las Aventuras de los Parchís" (Argentina 1982)

1. Tarzán, Tarzán
2. Hasta Luego Cocodrilo (15)
3. Pregúntale a Juan
4. Pancho López
5. Hay Que Vencer Al Miedo
6. La Batalla De Los Planetas (Popurri) Unreleased Medley “Todas sus canciones… todos sus éxitos (España 2005)
7. Ya Estás Aquí (Maxi – single España 1982)
8. Los Muchachos (Niños)

Album 15 : "Las Locuras de Parchís" (España - 1982)

1. Arriba, Abajo
2. El Ritmo Loco
3. No Sé Porque
4. Bien, Bien Bravo
5. Las Rockeras de Santa Teresita
6. Vuelvo de Disney World
7. Safari en la Ciudad
8. Las Locuras de Parchís
9. Señor Búho
10. Mi Super Superman
11. Mi Guitarra
12. Auxilio, Socorro
13. Mi Amigo Pancho
14. Felicidades (from the film “Las Locuras de Parchís”)

Album 16 : "Feliz Navidad" (España - 1982)

1. Feliz Navidad (17)
2. La Virgen y San José
3. Pastores Venid
4. Una Pandereta Suena
5. La Noragüena
6. Catatumba, Tumba, Tumba
7. Ya Viene La Vieja
8. Madre en la Puerta Hay un Niño
9. Carrasclas
10. Tan, Tan de los Reyes
11. A Belen Pastorcitos
12. Zúmbale al Pandero
13. El Portal de Belen
14. Paquetitos Navideños (LP “15 Nuevos Villancicos “ / México - 1982)
15. Esto es America (LP “Las Locuras de Parchís “ /México - 1983)
16. Lucky, El Jinte Solitario (Unreleased Song “Sus Grandes Exitos” /España – 1985)
17. Scooby Doo (Unreleased Song “Un Globo, Dos Globos, Tres Globos” /España – 2002)

Album 17 : "Super Discolandia" (España- 1983)

1. Entra en Acción
2. En el Super Mercado
3. Vamos a Ganar
4. A Entrenar
5. A Vencer

Album 18 : "Siempre Parchís" (España - 1983)

1. No Pongas el Cassette
2. La Puerta Verde
3. La Banda Está Loca
4. Que Maravilla de Canción
5. Tranqui Tranqui
6. ¡Oh! Mamá, Papá
7. Marionetas en la Cuerda
8. Cosas de Críos
9. 24,000 Besos
10. La Dolce Vita
11. Yo También Quiero Fama
12. Quiero Que LLegue El Domingo
13. 24,000 Besos (24 Mila Baci) (Version 2) LP “Tranqui, Tranqui” / México 1983)
14. Fama (17)
15. No Pongas el Cassette (VERSION 2)

Album 19 : "Que Tal Te Va" (España - 1984)

1. Que Tal Te Va
2. Una Moto Quiero Yo
3. Ahora Sí
4. La Timidez
5. Tartamudeo
6. Viva el Cinco
7. Tal Para Cual
8. No Me Mientas
9. La Del Suéter Gris
10. Suspenso Total
11. Sábado, Sábado (LP “Que Tal Te Va “/ México -1984)
12. Me Estoy Volviendo Loco

Album 20 : "Decídete, Atrévete" (México - 1985)

1. No Sé, No Sé
2. La Colegiala
3. Yo Soy Como Soy
4. Lobo Hombre en París
5. Dime Cual Fue la razon
6. LLamas a Mi Puerta
7. Decídete, Atrévete
8. Nubes De Colores
9. Joven Primer Amor
10. Dissidia

== See also ==
- Parchis: The Documentary
- List of best-selling Latin music artists
