= Io (film) =

2019 film by Jonathan Helpert

- Official poster
- Directed by: Jonathan Helpert
- Written by: Clay Jeter; Charles Spano; Will Basanta
- Produced by: Jason Michael Berman; Laura Rister
- Starring: Margaret Qualley; Anthony Mackie; Danny Huston
- Cinematography: André Chemetoff
- Edited by: Mike Fromentin
- Music by: Henry Jackman; Alex Belcher
- Production companies: Mandalay Pictures; Sunset Junction Entertainment; Untitled Entertainment; Great Point Media
- Distributed by: Netflix
- Release date: January 18, 2019
- Running time: 96 minutes
- Country: United States
- Language: English

Io (stylized as IO) is a 2019 American post-apocalyptic science fiction film directed by Jonathan Helpert. It stars Margaret Qualley, Anthony Mackie, and Danny Huston.

It was released on January 18, 2019, by Netflix. Critical reception was poor.

== Plot ==
The film is set in a post-apocalyptic present, where Earth's atmosphere has become toxic. Most humans have fled the planet, to live on a space station near Io, a moon of Jupiter.

Sam Walden is one of the few humans remaining on Earth. She lives alone at high altitudes, where the air is still breathable, trying to raise bees that can survive in the atmosphere. She intends to use the bees to eventually clean the air via the pollination of oxygen-producing plants. Her very long-distance boyfriend, who lives on the Io station, urges her to leave Earth on the last shuttle from the planet.

A storm creates a toxic cloud that passes through Sam's shelter, killing all her bees. Micah, a man traveling by helium balloon, arrives shortly thereafter. He intends to reach the launch site and leave Earth but first wants to speak with Dr. Harry Walden, Sam's father, who had urged mankind to stay because he still saw hope.

Initially, Sam states that her father is conducting field work elsewhere. However, after a day, she reveals that her father died the previous year. Hearing this, Micah is determined to take Sam with him to the space shuttle, to which she apathetically agrees. After receiving a message from her boyfriend saying goodbye, because he is part of an expedition embarking on a 10-year voyage to an exoplanet orbiting Alpha Centauri, Sam records a message informing everyone still on Earth that Dr. Walden's attempt to clean the planet was ultimately unsuccessful and that everybody should leave and go to Io.

While preparing and waiting for the right wind conditions, Sam and Micah discover a new queen bee, hatched in Sam's hive, which is immune to the toxic air. They also grow closer, but he is reluctant to become romantically involved, angry that Dr. Walden's belief that humans can stay on Earth led to his wife's death. Sam insists that they must have sex.

A transmission reveals that the shuttle launch is rescheduled to another site, farther away than the original. As a result, they drive down from the foothills to a city blanketed by the toxic atmosphere to obtain the helium required for the journey. After finding the helium, Sam visits an art museum alone. Micah rushes after her, knowing her oxygen tank is running low. Instead of switching to a new tank, Sam pulls off her mask and breathes the toxic air hoping to survive. She takes several breaths, as the scene fades to black. Micah travels alone to the spaceship because Sam has decided to stay behind.

Sam has adapted to the changed environment like the new queen bee in her colony. The film ends with her standing on a beach alone before being joined by a young child (presumably Micah's son). A voice-over of a letter from Sam to Micah tells how beautiful the Earth is, how those who have left the planet will have learned to fear it, and that she and the child are waiting for them to return.

== Cast ==
- Margaret Qualley as Sam Walden
- Anthony Mackie as Micah
- Danny Huston as Dr. Harry Walden
- Tom Payne as the voice of Elon

== Production ==
In January 2015, it was reported that Elle Fanning and Diego Luna would star in the film with Clay Jeter directing from a screenplay he co-wrote with Will Basanta and Charles Spano. However, in October 2016, Margaret Qualley replaced Fanning, Anthony Mackie replaced Luna, with Danny Huston also cast in the film. Jonathan Helpert was also set to replace Jeter as director while retaining the Jeter/Basanta/Spano screenplay.

Principal photography began in October 2016.

== Release ==
The film was released on January 18, 2019.

== Reception ==
The review aggregator website Rotten Tomatoes reported an approval rating of 33% based on 27 reviews, with an average of 5/10. The website's critical consensus reads, "IO has some big ideas but little idea of how to effectively convey them, leaving viewers with a sci-fi drama whose attractive packaging can't cover its enervating core." Metacritic, which uses a weighted average, assigned a score of 40 out of 100 based on 6 critics, indicating "mixed or average" reviews.

Nick Allen of RogerEbert.com gave the film 2 stars out of 4 stars, writing, "However pure its intentions, IO is genre minimalism to a fault." He added, "IO isn’t science-fiction storytelling distilled so much as it is vaporized."

== See also ==
- List of films featuring space stations
- List of Netflix original films (2019)
