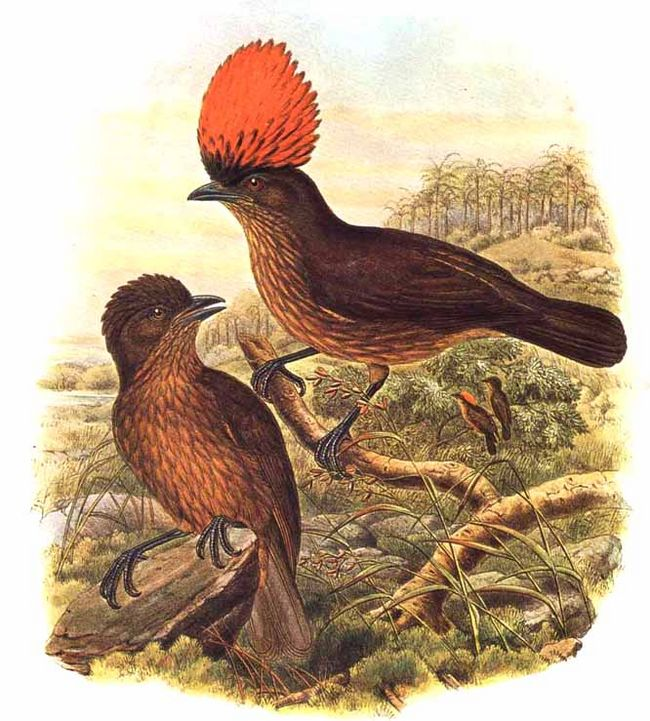

Conservation status
- Least Concern (IUCN 3.1)

Scientific classification
- Kingdom: Animalia
- Phylum: Chordata
- Class: Aves
- Order: Passeriformes
- Family: Ptilonorhynchidae
- Genus: Amblyornis
- Species: A. subalaris

Binomial name
- Amblyornis subalaris Sharpe, 1884

= Streaked bowerbird =

Species of bird

The streaked bowerbird (Amblyornis subalaris) is a species of bowerbird, native to the Bird's Tail Peninsula (southeastern New Guinea). They are approximately 22 cm long and have an olive-brown colouring. The male has a short orange crest which is not visible unless displayed.

The streaked bowerbird is a polygamous species. The nest is built by the male out of sticks. It has a characteristic hut shape with two entrances.
