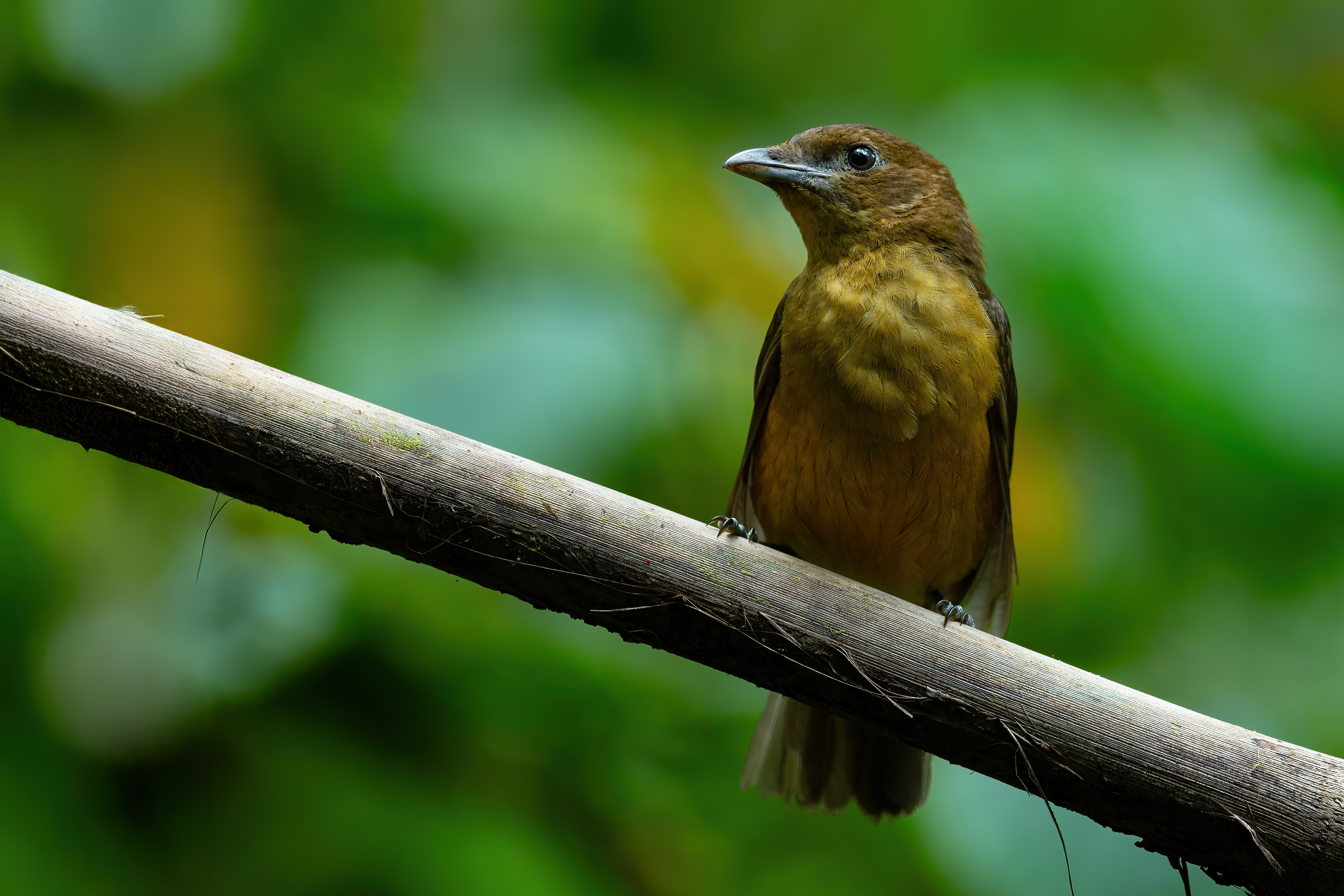

Conservation status
- Least Concern (IUCN 3.1)

Scientific classification
- Kingdom: Animalia
- Phylum: Chordata
- Class: Aves
- Order: Passeriformes
- Family: Ptilonorhynchidae
- Genus: Amblyornis
- Species: A. inornata

Binomial name
- Amblyornis inornata (Schlegel, 1871)

= Vogelkop bowerbird =

Species of bird

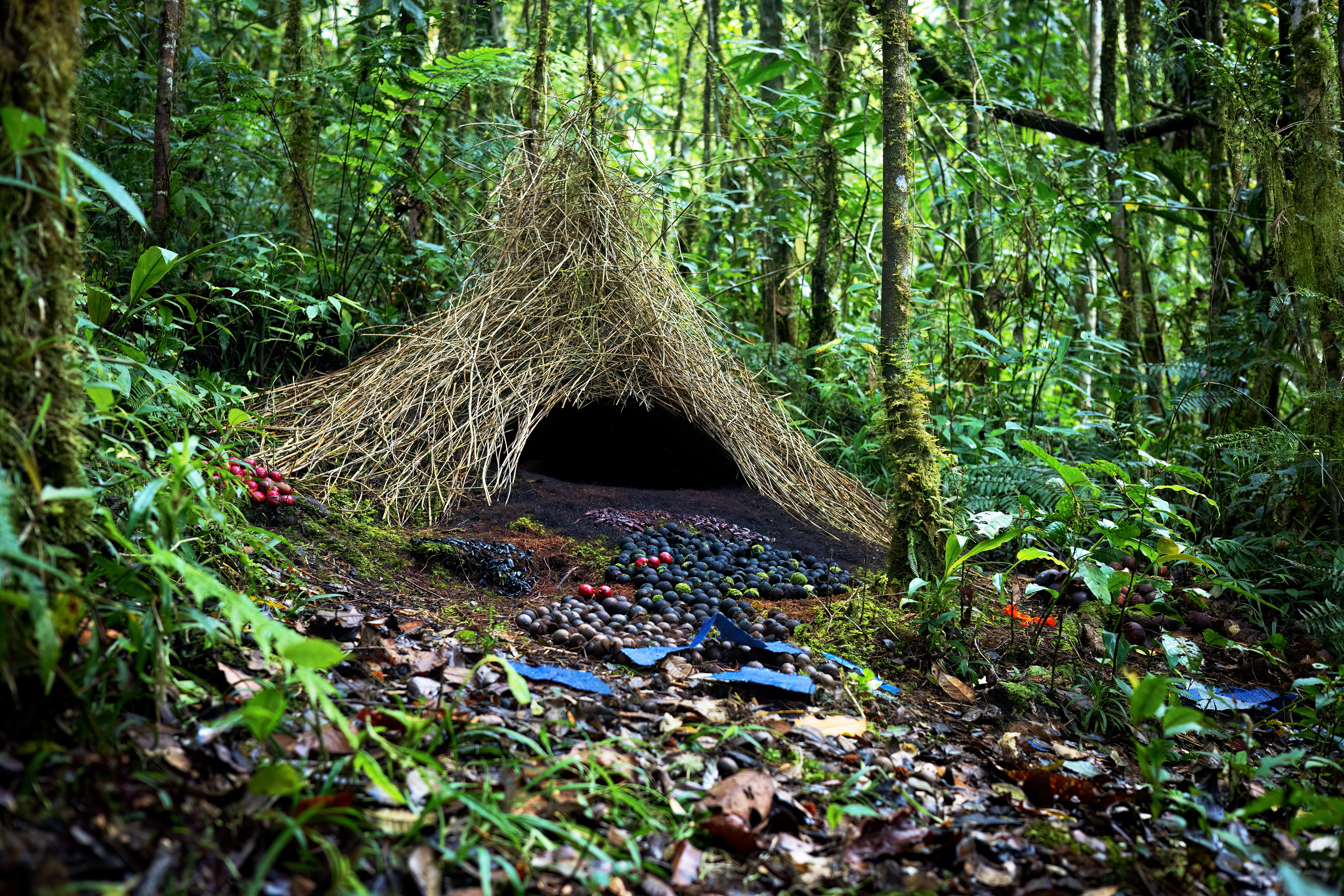
Vogelkop bowerbird bower

The Vogelkop bowerbird (Amblyornis inornata), also known as the Vogelkop gardener bowerbird, is a medium-sized bowerbird of the mountains of West Papua (New Guinea).

== Taxonomy ==
The Vogelkop bowerbird was formally described in 1871 by the German naturalist Hermann Schlegel based on specimens collected by Hermann von Rosenberg in the mountains of the Vogelkop Peninsula (Bird's Head Peninsula) of western New Guinea. Schlegel coined the binomial name Ptilorhynchus inornatus. The Vogelkop bowerbird is now one of five species placed in the genus Amblyornis that was introduced in 1872 by the American zoologist Daniel Giraud Elliot. The specific epithet inornata is Latin meaning "plain" or "unadorned". The species is monotypic: no subspecies are recognised.

== Description ==
The birds are about 25 cm (9.8 in) in overall in length. The sexes have similar plumage but the female is fractionally smaller. They are mainly olive brown in colour, though somewhat paler below, without ornamental plumage. This makes the species one of the dullest-coloured members of the bowerbird family with, however, one of the largest and most elaborate bowers.

== Bower ==
The bower is a cone-shaped hut-like structure some 100 cm high and 160 cm in diameter, with an entrance usually propped up by two column-like sticks. A front "lawn" of some square metres area is cleaned of debris and laid out with moss. On this, and in the entrance of the bower, decorations such as colourful flowers or fruit, shining beetle elytra, dead leaves and other conspicuous objects are collected and artistically arranged.

Males go to great lengths to ensure that their displays are in prime condition, replacing old items as needed, as well as trying to outdo their neighbours by finding more spectacular decorations, and arranging them appropriately. As opposed to other species of bowerbirds, such as the satin bowerbird, there is no fixed preference for items of a certain colour, more important being the "novelty value" of the items instead, which can lead to fashion-like trends if males find rare or unusual items; such rare finds are prime targets for theft by neighboring males. Females visit bowers and, depending on whether they like the "treasure trove" on display, will mate with the attendant males. The bower, indeed the male, play no part in nesting and raising the young.

The songs and mimicry skill of this bird are well known among the indigenous peoples. In September 1872, Odoardo Beccari became the first naturalist to see the home grounds of this bowerbird in the Arfak Mountains of Irian Jaya.

Because of its unadorned and plain plumage, this bowerbird is relatively safe from persecution. A common species within its limited habitat range, the Vogelkop bowerbird is evaluated as Least Concern on the IUCN Red List of Threatened Species.
