= Back to school (marketing) =

Period in which students and their parents purchase school supplies

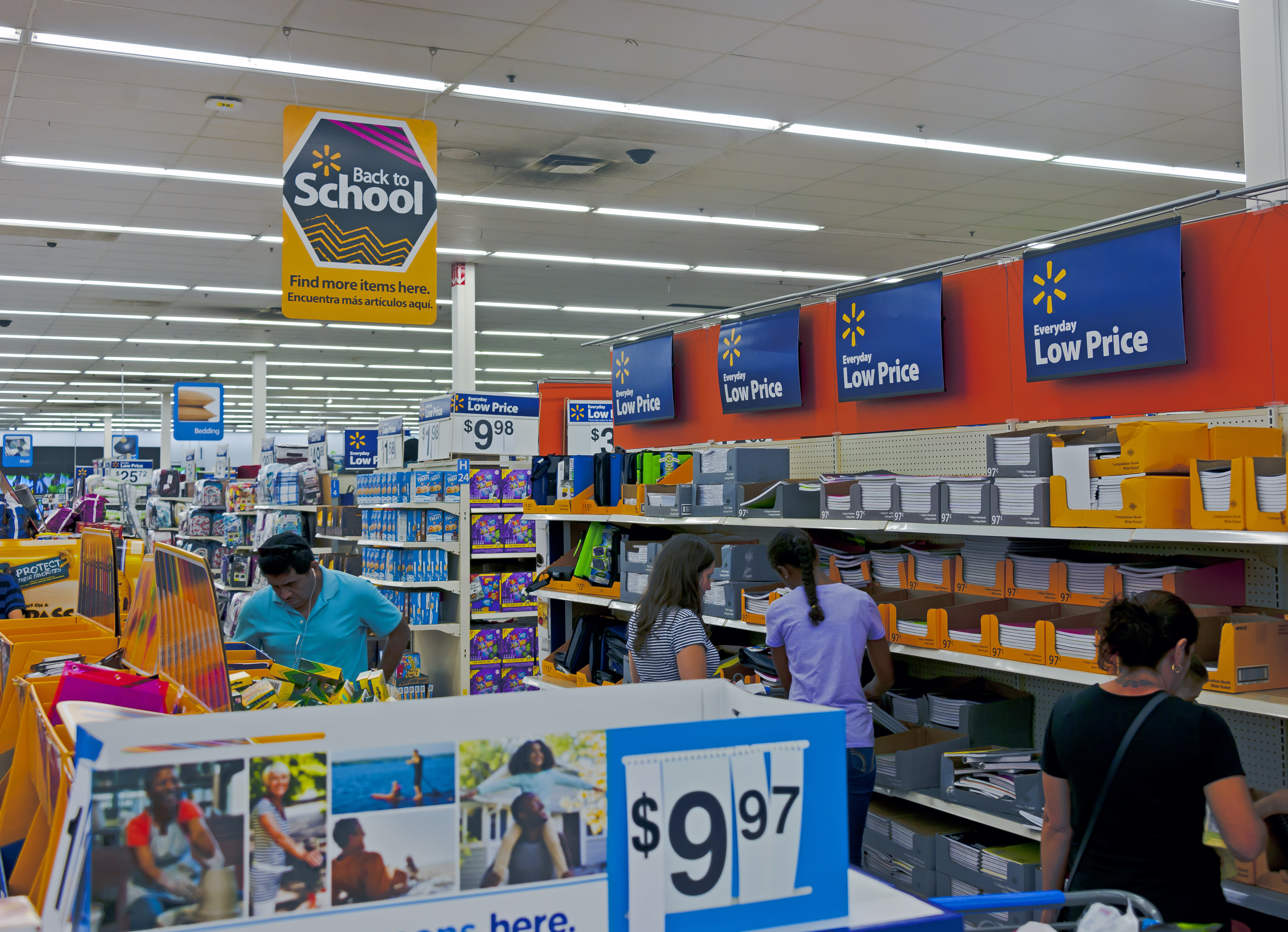
Back-to-school sale at a Walmart

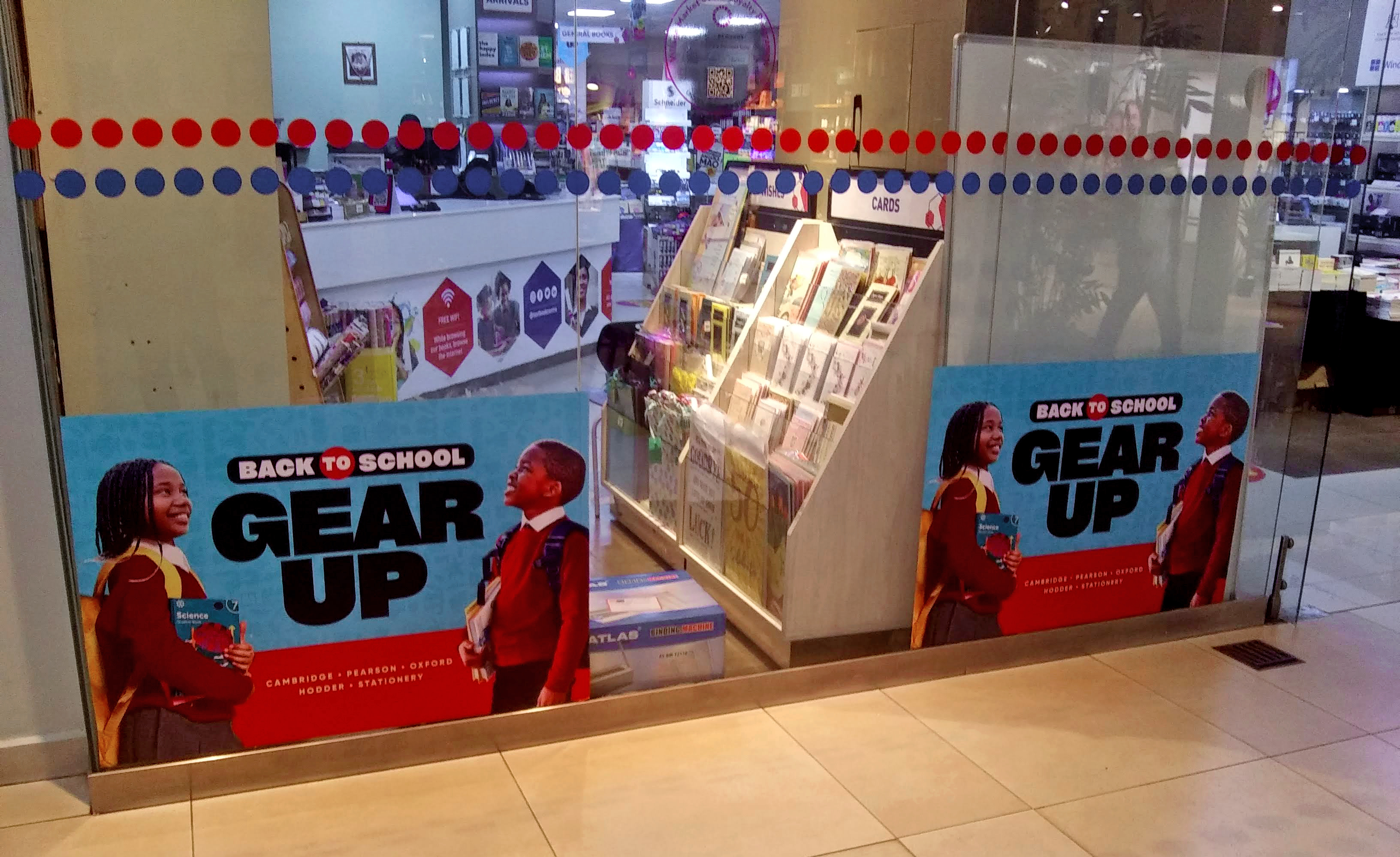
Back to school signs at store in Kenya

In merchandising, back to school is the period in which students and their parents purchase school supplies and apparel for the upcoming school year. At many department stores, back-to-school sales are advertised as a time when school supplies, children's, and young adults' clothing go on sale. Office supplies have also become an important part of back-to-school sales, with the rise in prominence of personal computers and related equipment in education. Traditional supplies such as paper, pens, pencils and binders will often be marked at steep discounts, often as loss leaders to entice shoppers to buy other items in the store. Many states offer tax-free periods (usually about a week long) at which time any school supplies and children's clothing purchased does not have sales tax added.

== Timing ==
The back-to-school period of time usually starts and ends in August before the school year starts in the United States, Europe, and Canada. In Australia and New Zealand, this usually occurs in February, while in Malaysia, this period lasts from November to December. In India, the back-to-school sales traditionally start in June when schools are about to open. In Japan, which is unusual in that it starts its school year in spring, back-to-school sales are traditionally held in March.

In Canada and the United States, back-to-school shopping is associated with Labor Day, which falls on the first Monday of September. While Labor Day is a widely observed holiday, it has no official celebration. Labor Day has since become symbolic of the unofficial "end of summer". Most schools and colleges begin their school year around this time, so the holiday has become a back-to-school shopping tradition – much as Memorial Day and Victoria Day, and Canada Day and Independence Day are associated with summer and patriotic products, respectively, and American Thanksgiving has been associated with the impending start of the Christmas shopping season.
