= Toni Morrison: The Pieces I Am =

2019 documentary film

- theatrical release poster
- Directed by: Timothy Greenfield-Sanders
- Produced by: Johanna Giebelhaus; Timothy Greenfield-Sanders; Chad Thompson; Tommy Walker
- Starring: Toni Morrison
- Music by: Kathryn Bostic
- Release date: 27 January 2019 (Sundance Film Festival)
- Country: United States
- Language: English
- Box office: $903,018

Toni Morrison: The Pieces I Am is a 2019 documentary film, directed by Timothy Greenfield-Sanders, and produced by Johanna Giebelhaus, Greenfield-Sanders, Chad Thompson, and Tommy Walker. It follows American novelist Toni Morrison who examines her life and work. The film also features Oprah Winfrey, Fran Lebowitz, Russell Banks, Angela Davis and Barack Obama.

== Synopsis ==
Morrison was an American novelist from Lorain, Ohio. In 1988, she earned the Pulitzer Prize for Fiction for her novel Beloved and in 1993, she became the first Black woman to win the Nobel Prize in Literature. She died on 5 August 2019. In the film, she and various friends, colleagues and literary critics discuss her life, work, and the themes she has explored throughout her career.

== Reception ==
=== Critical response ===
On the review aggregator Rotten Tomatoes, the film holds an approval rating of 97% based on 101 reviews, with an average rating of 8.1/10. The website's critical consensus reads, "Toni Morrison: The Pieces I Am honors its acclaimed subject with a comprehensive, illuminating, and fittingly profound overview of her life and work." Metacritic, which uses a weighted average, assigned the film a score of 80 out of 100, based on 14 critics, indicating "generally favorable reviews".

Alan Zilberman of The Washington Post wrote: "The film suffers from some of the familiar bad habits of the biographical documentary. At times, Greenfield-Sanders provides too many images and too much context, almost as if he doesn't trust his own subject. The use of music — more filler than necessary at times — is also cloying". Gary Goldstein of The Los Angeles Times wrote: "The remarkable documentary 'Toni Morrison: The Pieces I Am' does so many things so well that it's often like watching several fine films at once. Look for this one to be front and center in its category come Oscar time." Nick Schager of Variety wrote: "Yet, inasmuch as it locates the heart of the author's inspirations and attitudes, as well as her guiding ethos to capture grand national truths while focusing on the complex interior particulars of individual experience, 'Toni Morrison: The Pieces I Am,' at its best, serves the soul of its subject." Caryn James of The Hollywood Reporter wrote: "In The Pieces I Am, the outer self is enough to let viewers know that Morrison and her novels are treasures."

Joshua Brunsting of CriterionCast wrote: "It's a captivating, if flat, meditation on one of the great artists of our time, and while it may lean into hagiography, there are moments of genuine introspection that make this more than worthy of one's time". David Bax of the Battleship Pretension wrote: "The film resists analysis in its essayistic plainness. Though Morrison's writing is alive–jumping, soaring and diving deep–Greenfield-Sanders' film lays flat on the surface."

=== Accolades ===
Year	Award	Category	Nominees	Result	Ref.
2020	AARP Movies for Grownups Awards	Best Documentary	Timothy Greenfield-Sanders	Nominated	
2020	Black Reel Awards	Outstanding Documentary	Timothy Greenfield-Sanders	Nominated	
2020	News & Documentary Emmy Awards	Outstanding Arts and Culture Documentary		Nominated	
2020	News & Documentary Emmy Awards	Outstanding Music Composition	Kathryn Bostic	Nominated	
2020	News & Documentary Emmy Awards	Outstanding Research	Johanna Giebelhaus	Nominated	
2020	NAACP Image Awards	Outstanding Documentary		Won	
2019	Critics' Choice Documentary Awards	Best Biographical Documentary		Won	
2019	Hollywood Music in Media Awards	Best Original Score in a Documentary	Kathryn Bostic	Nominated	
2019	Society of Composers & Lyricists Awards	Outstanding Original Score for an Independent Film	Kathryn Bostic	Won	
2019	Society of Composers & Lyricists Awards	Outstanding Original Song for Visual Media	"High Above The Water" by Kathryn Bostic	Nominated	
