= Back to School =

1986 American comedy film by Alan Metter

- Theatrical release poster
- Directed by: Alan Metter
- Screenplay by: Steven Kampmann; Will Porter; Peter Torokvei; Harold Ramis
- Story by: Rodney Dangerfield; Greg Fields; Dennis Snee
- Produced by: Chuck Russell
- Starring: Rodney Dangerfield; Sally Kellerman; Burt Young; Keith Gordon; Adrienne Barbeau; Robert Downey Jr.; Sam Kinison; Ned Beatty
- Cinematography: Thomas E. Ackerman
- Edited by: David Rawlins
- Music by: Danny Elfman
- Production company: Paper Clip Productions
- Distributed by: Orion Pictures
- Release date: June 13, 1986
- Running time: 96 minutes
- Country: United States
- Language: English
- Budget: $11 million
- Box office: $91.3 million

Back to School is a 1986 American comedy film starring Rodney Dangerfield, Keith Gordon, Sally Kellerman, Burt Young, Terry Farrell, William Zabka, Ned Beatty, Sam Kinison, Paxton Whitehead, Robert Downey Jr., M. Emmet Walsh, and Adrienne Barbeau. It was directed by Alan Metter. The plot centers on a wealthy but uneducated father (Dangerfield) who goes to college to show solidarity with his discouraged son Jason (Gordon) and learns that he cannot buy an education or happiness.

Kurt Vonnegut has a cameo as himself, as does the band Oingo Boingo, whose frontman Danny Elfman composed the score for the film. The University of Wisconsin–Madison was used as a backdrop for the movie, although it was called "Grand Lakes University". The diving scenes were filmed at the since-demolished Industry Hills Aquatic Club in the City of Industry, California.

Back to School was a critical and financial success.

== Plot ==
Thornton Meloni, a child of Italian immigrants, returns from school one day to his father's tailor shop, bearing a report card with poor grades. His ambition is to go into his father's line of work, but the latter warns Thornton that "If a man has no education, he's got nothing."

As decades pass, Thornton anglicizes his surname from Meloni to "Melon" and becomes a self-made corporate giant, with a successful chain of plus-size clothing stores and other business ventures. He also has a son named Jason. Jason becomes a college student who avoids Thornton despite their previous closeness. Jason's mother has died, Thornton has remarried to a gold digger named Vanessa. When Vanessa splurges on an expensive party, Thornton reaches his breaking point and wishes to see Jason. He divorces Vanessa for adultery and instructs Lou, his bodyguard and chauffeur, to take him to Grand Lakes University.

On the campus, Thornton learns that the reason for Jason's distant attitude with his father was that he is a C-student, unhappy with college life, and intends to drop out. He is a towel boy for the diving team instead of a member, was rejected by the fraternities, is antagonized by diver and jock Chas Osborne, and has no friends except for his roommate Derek Lutz. Thornton motivates him to stay in college by deciding to enroll alongside him. Despite Thornton's lack of academic qualifications, the dean David Martin admits him when he bribes Martin with a donation for a new campus building.

Thornton's bribery earns him the wrath of Dr. Philip Barbay, dean of the business school. His displeasure is further exacerbated by Thornton's canny practical experience clashing with Barbay's hypothetical theorizing in class and ivory tower ways. Thornton also develops a romantic interest in Barbay's girlfriend, the literature professor Dr. Diane Turner. Meanwhile, Jason begins to attract the interest of Valerie Desmond, a girl whom Chas has been trying to impress. Thornton becomes a popular man on campus, throwing huge parties and exhibiting generosity to his fellow students. Jason earns a spot on the diving team, after Thornton, a former diver himself, convinces the diving coach to reconsider his abilities. Despite all this, Jason still feels he is living in Thornton’s shadow.

As a student, even though Diane is inspiring a deeper appreciation of literature, Thornton prefers partying to studying. He hires a team of professionals to complete his assignments, including Kurt Vonnegut to write a paper on Vonnegut for literature class. To Thornton's surprise, Diane gives the paper a failing grade for obviously not being his own work and becomes disillusioned by his frivolous behavior. Jason is also upset with Thornton for trivializing education, while mistakenly believing Chas who lied that Thornton bribed the coach into accepting him on the team.

Dr. Barbay accuses Thornton, in the presence of Dean Martin, of academic fraud. He challenges Thornton to an oral examination conducted by all of his professors, facing expulsion if he fails any part of it. Believing he has no chance of passing, Thornton packs up and prepares to leave. After a talk with Lou, a remorseful Jason stops Thornton and encourages him to stay and prepare for the challenge.

With limited time to prepare, Thornton crams for the examination with help from Jason, Derek, Lou, and Diane. When the big day comes, Barbay begins by intimidating Thornton with a single, 27-part question. Nevertheless, Thornton answers every part, though the effort is so much that he wants to forfeit. Diane inspires him to finish by asking him to recite a Dylan Thomas poem, "Do not go gentle into that good night," which he does and is reinvigorated to proceed with the examination.

At the championship dive meet later that day, Thornton and Jason reconcile, while Grand Lakes University takes the lead. To spite Jason for his performance and for winning over Valerie, Chas fakes a cramp in an attempt to make his team lose. The coach decides to recruit Thornton as a last-minute replacement. Thornton helps the team win by performing the legendary but dangerous "Triple Lindy" dive. Afterwards, Thornton learns from Diane that he has passed the examination with all D's, except for a single A from her. At the end of the school year, Thornton gives the commencement speech.

== Cast ==
- Rodney Dangerfield as Thornton Melon
- Sally Kellerman as Dr. Diane Turner
- Burt Young as Lou
- Keith Gordon as Jason Melon
- Robert Downey Jr. as Derek Lutz
- William Zabka as Chas Osborne
- Paxton Whitehead as Dr. Phillip Barbay
- Adrienne Barbeau as Vanessa Melon
- M. Emmet Walsh as Coach Turnbull
- Terry Farrell as Valerie Desmond
- Ned Beatty as Dean Martin
- Sam Kinison as Professor Terguson
- Severn Darden as Dr. Borozini
- Robert Picardo as Giorgio
- Jason Hervey as Young Thornton
- Edie McClurg as Marge Sweetwater
- Kurt Vonnegut as himself (cameo)
- Danny Elfman as himself (cameo)

== Production ==
Harold Ramis suggested a rewrite to the script. The producers originally wanted Jim Carrey to play the role of Professor Terguson, but he was later rejected as he was deemed too young for the part.

Before the end credits, the message "For ESTELLE Thanks For So Much" is shown in dedication to Estelle Endler, one of the executive producers of the film, who died during production. She was Dangerfield's long-time manager, who helped him get into films such as Caddyshack.

== Reception ==
Back to School yielded $91.3 million domestically, and was the sixth highest-grossing film of 1986, as well as the second highest grossing comedy film of the year, behind Crocodile Dundee (records state that in addition to the rental and theatrical gross it received, it went on to gross $108,634,920 globally).

On Rotten Tomatoes, the film holds an 81% rating based on 73 reviews, with an average rating of 6.50/10. The site's consensus reads, "Back to School gives Rodney Dangerfield plenty of room to riff—and supports the freewheeling funnyman with enough of a story to keep things interesting between punchlines." On Metacritic it has a score of 68 out of 100 based on reviews from 9 critics, indicating "generally favorable" reviews. Audiences polled by CinemaScore gave the film an average grade of "A−" on an A+ to F scale.

Kevin Thomas of the Los Angeles Times noted that "Dangerfield seems to be setting the film's brisk pace and flawless timing himself." Nina Darnton wrote in The New York Times that "the film is a good-natured potpourri of gags, funny bits, populist sentiment and anti-intellectualism." Roger Ebert's Chicago Sun-Times three-star review described the film as "routine but pleasant", yet elevated by Dangerfield's persona: "This is exactly the sort of plot Marx or Fields could have appeared in. Dangerfield brings it something they might also have brought along: a certain pathos."

== Soundtrack ==
Back to School

Soundtrack album by Various Artists
- Released: 1986
- Genres: Pop; rock; soul
- Length: 35:34
- Label: MCA

The soundtrack was released on MCA, available in LP or Cassette (no CD), but cues from the score were released that year with selections from the score of Pee-wee's Big Adventure (both re-recordings made in London) on CD.

No.	Title	Writer(s)	Performer(s)	Length
1.	"Back to School"	Richard Wolf & Mark Leonard	Jude Cole	4:16
2.	"Educated Girl"	Bobby Caldwell & Randy Goodrum	Bobby Caldwell	4:07
3.	"Learnin' and Livin'"	David Tyson & Eddie Schwartz	Tyson & Schwartz	3:25
4.	"Everybody's Crazy" (from Everybody's Crazy, 1985)	Bolton	Michael Bolton	4:37
5.	"I'll Never Forget Your Face"	Richard Wolf & Wayne Perkins	Phillip Ingram	4:07
6.	"Twist and Shout" (Isley Brothers cover, original 1962)	Phil Medley, Bert Russell	Rodney Dangerfield	2:51
7.	"Dead Man's Party" (from Dead Man's Party, 1985)	Danny Elfman	Oingo Boingo	6:17
8.	"On My Way"	David Tyson & Eddie Schwartz	Tyson & Schwartz	3:30
9.	"Respect" (from I Never Loved a Man the Way I Love You, 1967)	Otis Redding	Aretha Franklin	2:24

== In popular culture ==
The competition scene was parodied in the music video for Canadian rock band Sum 41's 2001 single "In Too Deep".

== See also ==
- High Time
- List of American films of 1986
