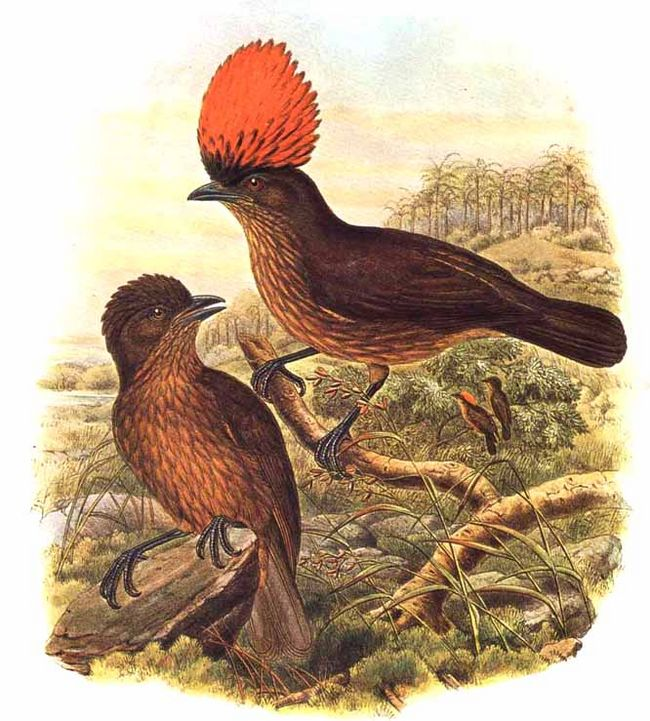
- Streaked bowerbird, Amblyornis subalaris

Scientific classification
- Kingdom: Animalia
- Phylum: Chordata
- Class: Aves
- Order: Passeriformes
- Family: Ptilonorhynchidae
- Genus: Amblyornis; Elliot, 1872

Type species
- Ptilorhynchus inornatus Schlegel, 1871

= Amblyornis =

Genus of birds

Amblyornis is a genus of passerine birds belonging to the bowerbird family Ptilonorhynchidae. The species are endemic to the mountains of New Guinea.

Birds in this genus build "maypole-type" bowers in which vegetation is arranged around a central vertical sapling or tree-fern.

== Taxonomy ==
The genus Amblyornis was introduced in 1872 by the American zoologist Daniel Giraud Elliot to accommodate a single species, Ptilorhynchus inornatus Schlegel, 1871, the Vogelkop bowerbird, which is the type species by monotypy. The genus name combines the Ancient Greek αμβλυοεις/ambluoeis meaning "dull" with ορνις/ornis meaning "bird".

=== Species ===
The genus contains four species:

Image	Name	Common name	Distribution
	Amblyornis flavifrons	Golden-fronted bowerbird	Foja Mountains in the Papua province of Indonesia
	Amblyornis macgregoriae	MacGregor's bowerbird	New Guinea
	Amblyornis subalaris	Streaked bowerbird	southeastern New Guinea
	Amblyornis inornata	Vogelkop bowerbird	Bird's Head Peninsula (Vogelkop Peninsula) of western New Guinea
