= Santa Rita =

Santa Rita may refer to:

- Rita of Cascia (1381–1457), Catholic saint
- Associação Atlética Santa Rita, a Brazilian football (soccer) club
- Santa Rita de Cássia FC, an Angolan football (soccer) club

== Places ==
=== Belize ===
- Santa Rita, Corozal, a Maya ruin and archaeological reserve

=== Bolivia ===
- Santa Rita (El Torno)

=== Brazil ===
- Santa Rita, Maranhão, a town in Maranhão state
- Santa Rita, Paraíba, a town in Paraíba state
- Santa Rita de Cássia, a town in Bahia
- Santa Rita de Cássia dos Coqueiros or Cássia dos Coqueiros, a village in São Paulo state
- Santa Rita do Araguaia, Goiás
- Santa Rita do Novo Destino, Goiás
- Santa Rita do Trivelato, Mato Grosso
- Santa Rita do Pardo, Mato Grosso do Sul
- Santa Rita de Caldas, Minas Gerais
- Santa Rita de Ibitipoca, Minas Gerais
- Santa Rita de Jacutinga, Minas Gerais
- Santa Rita de Minas, Minas Gerais
- Santa Rita do Itueto, Minas Gerais
- Santa Rita do Sapucaí, Minas Gerais
- Santa Rita d'Oeste, São Paulo
- Santa Rita do Passa Quatro, São Paulo
- Santa Rita do Tocantins, Tocantins

=== Colombia ===
- Santa Rita, Vichada, a town and municipality in the Vichada Department

=== Costa Rica ===
- Santa Rita District, Río Cuarto, a district of the Río Cuarto canton, in the Alajuela province

=== El Salvador ===
- Santa Rita, Chalatenango

=== Guam ===
- Santa Rita, Guam

=== Honduras ===
- Santa Rita, Copán
- Santa Rita, Santa Bárbara
- Santa Rita, Yoro

=== Mexico ===
- Santa Rita Tlahuapan, a municipality of Puebla

=== Panama ===
- Santa Rita, Coclé
- Santa Rita, Panamá Oeste

=== Paraguay ===
- Santa Rita, Paraguay
- Santa Rita District, Paraguay

=== Peru ===
- Santa Rita de Siguas District, Arequipa

=== Philippines ===
- Santa Rita, Pampanga
- Santa Rita, Samar

=== Puerto Rico ===
- Santa Rita (Hato Rey), a sector of Hato Rey

=== United States ===
- Santa Rita, California (disambiguation), multiple locations
- Santa Rita, Montana
- Santa Rita, New Mexico, a ghost town
- Santa Rita, Texas, a ghost town
- Santa Rita Jail, Dublin, Alameda County, California
- Santa Rita Mountains, Arizona

=== Venezuela ===
- Santa Rita, Aragua
- Santa Rita, Zulia, Zulia

== Other uses ==
- Santa Rita, Cremona, an ancient Roman Catholic church in Cremona, Italy
- SS Santa Rita (1941), a cargo ship
