= The Irishman: In Conversation =

2019 documentary short film

- Film poster
- Starring: Martin Scorsese; Robert De Niro; Al Pacino; Joe Pesci
- Production company: Netflix Studios
- Distributed by: Netflix
- Release date: November 27, 2019
- Running time: 23 minutes
- Country: United States
- Language: English

The Irishman: In Conversation is a 2019 documentary short film starring Martin Scorsese, Robert De Niro, Al Pacino and Joe Pesci. The premise revolves around Scorsese speaking with De Niro, Pacino, and Pesci about their film The Irishman.

== Cast ==
- Robert De Niro
- Al Pacino
- Joe Pesci
- Martin Scorsese

== Release ==
The Irishman: In Conversation was released on November 27, 2019.
