= The Movies (miniseries) =

Documentary miniseries

- Genre: Television documentary
- Country of origin: United States
- No. of seasons: 1
- No. of episodes: 6

Production
- Executive producers: Tom Hanks; Gary Goetzman; Mark Herzog
- Running time: 120 minutes
- Production companies: Playtone; Herzog & Company; HBO

Original release
- Network: CNN
- Release: July 7 – August 18, 2019

Related
- The Sixties; The Seventies; The Eighties; The Nineties; The 2000s The 2010s

The Movies is a documentary miniseries premiered on CNN on July 7, 2019. Produced by Tom Hanks and Gary Goetzman's studio Playtone, the six-part series chronicles the cinema of the United States, ranging from the "Golden Age of Hollywood" to the present day. It is a spin-off of Hanks and Goetzman's retrospective miniseries for CNN (including The Sixties and its sequels).

== Production ==
Owing to the costs incurred with licensing the required film footage, episodes on cinema were not included in past Hanks/Goetzman miniseries projects such as The Sixties. In an interview with Deadline Hollywood, Goetzman remarked that "it cost a fortune, and some is fair use, depending on how you guys talk about it, and some isn't, but within it, it's an insane undertaking because the licensing is a very tricky business in this type of thing, and you know, you set out thinking, hey, this is going to be great, right? And then you realize you have approvals, you know, beyond belief with estates in a lot of the situations, too."

He went on to explain that the episodes, in their opinion, would present a "pretty good outline of what those decades are", and that they had managed to obtain every interview they had aimed to include—including John Singleton prior to his death in April 2019, as well as Martin Scorsese and Robert Redford almost immediately before a production deadline. Mark Herzog explained that "most directors like Singleton are really historians of film, and they know film, they know the impact of films, they study it, and so it was like talking to historians, all of them."

Owing to their complementary nature, Variety stated that CNN planned to incorporate The Movies' respective episodes into its marathons of past Hanks/Goetzman miniseries in the future.

The episode "The Sixties" was intended to air on August 4, but was delayed for coverage of mass shootings which had occurred that day in El Paso and Dayton.

== Episodes ==
No.	Title	Original release date	U.S. viewers (millions)
1	"The Eighties"	July 7, 2019	0.994
2	"The Nineties"	July 14, 2019	0.528
3	"The 2000s"	July 21, 2019	0.556
4	"The Seventies"	July 28, 2019	0.399
5	"The Sixties"	August 11, 2019	0.754
6	"The Golden Age"	August 18, 2019	0.723
The Golden Age of Hollywood from the 1930s through the 1950s.

== List of films represented ==
Each episode section below lists the film clips from the decade that are featured in that episode.

=== Episode 1: The Eighties ===
- Raging Bull (1980)
- The Elephant Man (1980)
- Coal Miner's Daughter (1980)
- Cruising (1980)
- Ordinary People (1980)
- Blue Velvet (1986)
- The King of Comedy (1982)
- The Shining (1980)
- Heaven's Gate (1980)
- The Empire Strikes Back (1980)
- Raiders of the Lost Ark (1981)
- E.T. the Extra-Terrestrial (1982)
- Poltergeist (1982)
- The Goonies (1985)
- Gremlins (1984)
- Back to the Future (1985)
- Who Framed Roger Rabbit (1988)
- The Verdict (1982)
- The Big Chill (1983)
- Terms of Endearment (1983)
- Hannah and Her Sisters (1986)
- Zelig (1983)
- Broadway Danny Rose (1984)
- The Purple Rose of Cairo (1985)
- Crimes and Misdemeanors (1989)
- When Harry Met Sally... (1989)
- This Is Spinal Tap (1984)
- The Princess Bride (1987)
- Stand by Me (1986)
- Splash (1984)
- Airplane! (1980)
- The Naked Gun: From the Files of Police Squad! (1988)
- Police Academy (1984)
- Crocodile Dundee (1986)
- Three Men and a Baby (1987)
- The Blues Brothers (1980)
- Caddyshack (1980)
- Spies Like Us (1985)
- ¡Three Amigos! (1986)
- Vacation (1983)
- The Woman in Red (1984)
- Ghostbusters (1984)
- 48 Hrs. (1982)
- Trading Places (1983)
- Beverly Hills Cop (1984)
- Coming to America (1988)
- RoboCop (1987)
- Escape from New York (1981)
- Mad Max 2: The Road Warrior (1981)
- Brazil (1985)
- Blade Runner (1982)
- Aliens (1986)
- Fatal Attraction (1987)
- 9 to 5 (1980)
- Working Girl (1988)
- Broadcast News (1987)
- Tootsie (1982)
- Flashdance (1983)
- Footloose (1984)
- Dirty Dancing (1987)
- Purple Rain (1984)
- Fast Times at Ridgemont High (1982)
- Say Anything... (1989)
- Sixteen Candles (1984)
- Pretty in Pink (1986)
- Ferris Bueller's Day Off (1986)
- The Breakfast Club (1985)
- Risky Business (1983)
- First Blood (1982)
- Top Gun (1986)
- The Color of Money (1986)
- Rain Man (1988)
- Rambo: First Blood Part II (1985)
- Rocky IV (1985)
- The Terminator (1984)
- Commando (1985)
- Missing in Action (1984)
- Bloodsport (1988)
- Conan the Barbarian (1982)
- Rocky III (1982)
- Predator (1987)
- Die Hard (1988)
- Scarface (1983)
- Wall Street (1987)
- Platoon (1986)
- Born on the Fourth of July (1989)
- Good Morning, Vietnam! (1987)
- Full Metal Jacket (1987)
- Hamburger Hill (1987)
- Sophie's Choice (1982)
- Silkwood (1983)
- Out of Africa (1985)
- A Cry in the Dark (1988)
- Ironweed (1987)
- Glory (1989)
- Reds (1981)
- The Right Stuff (1983)
- The Last Emperor (1987)
- Ragtime (1981)
- Gandhi (1982)
- Amadeus (1984)
- Stranger Than Paradise (1984)
- Drugstore Cowboy (1989)
- Sex, Lies, and Videotape (1989)
- Blood Simple (1984)
- Raising Arizona (1987)
- Pee-wee's Big Adventure (1985)
- Beetlejuice (1988)
- Batman (1989)
- Do the Right Thing (1989)
- Field of Dreams (1989)
- Dead Poets Society (1989)
- The Natural (1984)
- Witness (1985)
- Empire of the Sun (1987)
- Desperately Seeking Susan (1985)
- Hoosiers (1986)
- Down and Out in Beverly Hills (1986)
- My Left Foot (1989)
- On Golden Pond (1981)
- The French Lieutenant's Woman (1981)
- Moonstruck (1987)
- Diner (1982)
- Parenthood (1989)
- Mississippi Burning (1988)
- Bull Durham (1988)
- The Killing Fields (1984)
- Body Heat (1981)
- A Nightmare on Elm Street (1984)
- Lethal Weapon (1987)
- The Untouchables (1987)
- Big (1988)
- Chariots of Fire (1981)
- Planes, Trains, & Automobiles (1987)
- The Abyss (1989)
- Once Upon a Time in America (1984)
- Return of the Jedi (1983)

=== Episode 2: The Nineties ===
- Goodfellas (1990)
- The Usual Suspects (1995)
- L.A. Confidential (1997)
- Heavenly Creatures (1994)
- Out of Sight (1998)
- Basic Instinct (1992)
- The Silence of the Lambs (1991)
- Thelma & Louise (1991)
- The Shawshank Redemption (1994)
- Casino (1995)
- Apollo 13 (1995)
- JFK (1991)
- Quiz Show (1994)
- Malcolm X (1992)
- Philadelphia (1993)
- Forrest Gump (1994)
- The Thin Red Line (1998)
- The End of the Affair (1999)
- The English Patient (1996)
- Saving Private Ryan (1998)
- Schindler's List (1993)
- Groundhog Day (1993)
- Rushmore (1998)
- Austin Powers: International Man of Mystery (1997)
- Happy Gilmore (1996)
- The Wedding Singer (1998)
- Wayne's World (1992)
- The Mask (1994)
- Dumb and Dumber (1994)
- Ace Ventura: Pet Detective (1994)
- There's Something About Mary (1998)
- L.A. Story (1991)
- Dr. Dolittle (1998)
- Mrs. Doubtfire (1993)
- Office Space (1999)
- Waiting for Guffman (1996)
- Boyz n the Hood (1991)
- Juice (1992)
- Poetic Justice (1993)
- New Jack City (1991)
- Higher Learning (1995)
- Friday (1995)
- House Party (1990)
- Crooklyn (1994)
- The Best Man (1999)
- Daughters of the Dust (1991)
- Just Another Girl on the I.R.T. (1992)
- Dead Presidents (1995)
- Set It Off (1996)
- Boomerang (1992)
- Soul Food (1997)
- Waiting to Exhale (1995)
- How Stella Got Her Groove Back (1998)
- Six Degrees of Separation (1993)
- Bad Boys (1995)
- Independence Day (1996)
- Men in Black (1997)
- Pretty Woman (1990)
- My Best Friend's Wedding (1997)
- Runaway Bride (1999)
- Notting Hill (1999)
- As Good as It Gets (1997)
- While You Were Sleeping (1995)
- Four Weddings and a Funeral (1994)
- Sleepless in Seattle (1993)
- You've Got Mail (1998)
- Jerry Maguire (1996)
- Clerks (1994)
- Hangin' with the Homeboys (1991)
- Welcome to the Dollhouse (1995)
- The Brothers McMullen (1995)
- Poison (1991)
- To Sleep with Anger (1990)
- Gas Food Lodging (1992)
- Trust (1990)
- Fresh (1994)
- The Basketball Diaries (1995)
- Slacker (1990)
- Dazed and Confused (1993)
- Reservoir Dogs (1992)
- Pulp Fiction (1994)
- Swingers (1996)
- The Little Mermaid (1989)
- Beauty and the Beast (1991)
- Aladdin (1992)
- The Lion King (1994)
- Toy Story (1995)
- Toy Story 2 (1999)
- The Nightmare Before Christmas (1993)
- Edward Scissorhands (1990)
- Ed Wood (1994)
- Dances with Wolves (1990)
- Little Man Tate (1991)
- Braveheart (1995)
- Unforgiven (1992)
- The Last of the Mohicans (1992)
- Heat (1995)
- Fargo (1996)
- The Big Lebowski (1998)
- Miller's Crossing (1990)
- Barton Fink (1991)
- The Hudsucker Proxy (1994)
- Boogie Nights (1997)
- Hard Eight (1996)
- Magnolia (1999)
- The Piano (1993)
- Little Women (1994)
- Grace of My Heart (1996)
- How to Make an American Quilt (1995)
- Point Break (1991)
- Awakenings (1990)
- Rambling Rose (1991)
- Walking and Talking (1996)
- Clueless (1995)
- A League of Their Own (1992)
- Terminator 2: Judgment Day (1991)
- Jurassic Park (1993)
- Romeo + Juliet (1996)
- Titanic (1997)
- The Matrix (1999)
- The Sixth Sense (1999)
- The Talented Mr. Ripley (1999)
- The Blair Witch Project (1999)
- Man on the Moon (1999)
- The Cider House Rules (1999)
- The Hurricane (1999)
- American Beauty (1999)
- Girl, Interrupted (1999)
- The Insider (1999)
- Election (1999)
- Boys Don't Cry (1999)
- The Virgin Suicides (1999)
- Three Kings (1999)
- Being John Malkovich (1999)
- Fight Club (1999)
- Ghost (1990)
- Trainspotting (1996)
- Contact (1997)
- Rosewood (1997)
- Blue Steel (1990)
- The Prince of Tides (1991)
- Se7en (1995)
- Home Alone (1990)
- Star Wars: Episode I – The Phantom Menace (1999)
- A Few Good Men (1992)

=== Episode 3: The 2000s ===
- Gladiator (2000)
- A Beautiful Mind (2001)
- Erin Brockovich (2000)
- Ocean's Eleven (2001)
- Legally Blonde (2001)
- Miss Congeniality (2000)
- The Devil Wears Prada (2006)
- The Departed (2006)
- Cast Away (2000)
- Minority Report (2002)
- Ali (2001)
- Training Day (2001)
- Almost Famous (2000)
- Moulin Rouge! (2001)
- Chicago (2002)
- Dreamgirls (2006)
- Mamma Mia! (2008)
- La La Land (2016)
- Shrek (2001)
- Monsters, Inc. (2001)
- WALL-E (2008)
- The Incredibles (2004)
- Up (2009)
- Something's Gotta Give (2003)
- The Holiday (2006)
- It's Complicated (2009)
- My Big Fat Greek Wedding (2002)
- Lost in Translation (2003)
- Eternal Sunshine of the Spotless Mind (2004)
- Brokeback Mountain (2005)
- There Will Be Blood (2007)
- Gangs of New York (2002)
- Lincoln (2012)
- No Country for Old Men (2007)
- True Grit (2010)
- Slumdog Millionaire (2008)
- The Social Network (2010)
- Black Swan (2010)
- Boyhood (2014)
- The Master (2012)
- The Royal Tenenbaums (2001)
- Moonrise Kingdom (2012)
- The Grand Budapest Hotel (2014)
- Inglourious Basterds (2009)
- Django Unchained (2012)
- Harry Potter and the Sorcerer's Stone (2001)
- Harry Potter and the Chamber of Secrets (2002)
- Harry Potter and the Prisoner of Azkaban (2004)
- Harry Potter and the Deathly Hallows – Part 1 (2010)
- Harry Potter and the Deathly Hallows – Part 2 (2011)
- The Lord of the Rings: The Fellowship of the Ring (2001)
- The Lord of the Rings: The Two Towers (2002)
- The Lord of the Rings: The Return of the King (2003)
- The Hobbit: An Unexpected Journey (2012)
- American Sniper (2014)
- Pirates of the Caribbean: The Curse of the Black Pearl (2003)
- Twilight (2008)
- Casino Royale (2006)
- Transformers (2007)
- The Bourne Supremacy (2004)
- Mission: Impossible – Rogue Nation (2015)
- The Hangover (2009)
- Men in Black II (2002)
- Fast & Furious 6 (2013)
- Little Miss Sunshine (2006)
- Borat: Cultural Learnings of America for Make Benefit Glorious Nation of Kazakhstan (2006)
- Old School (2003)
- Elf (2003)
- Anchorman: The Legend of Ron Burgundy (2004)
- The 40-Year-Old Virgin (2005)
- Knocked Up (2007)
- Superbad (2007)
- Step Brothers (2008)
- Bridesmaids (2011)
- The Heat (2013)
- Spy (2015)
- Avatar (2009)
- The Hurt Locker (2009)
- Zero Dark Thirty (2012)
- Winter's Bone (2010)
- The Hunger Games (2012)
- Silver Linings Playbook (2012)
- American Hustle (2013)
- Joy (2015)
- Memento (2000)
- Batman Begins (2005)
- The Dark Knight (2008)
- Iron Man (2008)
- The Avengers (2012)
- Thor (2011)
- Captain America: The First Avenger (2011)
- Ant-Man (2015)
- Guardians of the Galaxy (2014)
- Doctor Strange (2016)
- Spider-Man Homecoming (2017)
- Avengers: Infinity War (2018)
- Birdman: or (The Unexpected Virtue of Ignorance) (2014)
- Pan's Labyrinth (2006)
- The Shape of Water (2017)
- Gravity (2013)
- Children of Men (2006)
- The Revenant (2015)
- 12 Years a Slave (2013)
- Selma (2014)
- Good Deeds (2012)
- Mudbound (2017)
- Straight Outta Compton (2015)
- Precious (2009)
- Moonlight (2016)
- Fruitvale Station (2013)
- Creed (2015)
- Black Panther (2018)
- The Kids Are All Right (2010)
- Lady Bird (2017)
- Tangerine (2015)
- The Florida Project (2017)
- Get Out (2017)
- Crazy Rich Asians (2018)
- Roma (2018)
- Wonder Woman (2017)
- Fences (2016)

=== Episode 4: The Seventies ===
- The Last Picture Show (1971)
- Citizen Kane (1941)
- Paint Your Wagon (1969)
- Doctor Dolittle (1967)
- Play Misty for Me (1971)
- The Sugarland Express (1974)
- The French Connection (1971)
- Straw Dogs (1971)
- Badlands (1973)
- Scarecrow (1973)
- The Long Goodbye (1973)
- Dirty Harry (1971)
- The Getaway (1972)
- Deliverance (1972)
- Klute (1971)
- The Last Detail (1973)
- Patton (1970)
- Finian's Rainbow (1968)
- THX 1138 (1971)
- The Godfather (1972)
- The Godfather: Part II (1974)
- Boxcar Bertha (1972)
- Mean Streets (1973)
- Taxi Driver (1976)
- Play It Again, Sam (1972)
- Bananas (1971)
- Sleeper (1973)
- Annie Hall (1977)
- Manhattan (1979)
- Blazing Saddles (1974)
- Young Frankenstein (1974)
- National Lampoon's Animal House (1978)
- Serpico (1973)
- Dog Day Afternoon (1975)
- Sweet Sweetback's Baadasssss Song (1971)
- Shaft (1971)
- Foxy Brown (1974)
- Coffy (1973)
- ‘Sheba, Baby’ (1975)
- Enter the Dragon (1973)
- American Graffiti (1973)
- Little Big Man (1970)
- Marathon Man (1976)
- Lenny (1974)
- The Shooting (1966)
- Carnal Knowledge (1971)
- Five Easy Pieces (1970)
- Chinatown (1974)
- One Flew Over the Cuckoo's Nest (1975)
- Jaws (1975)
- Close Encounters of the Third Kind (1977)
- MASH (1970)
- McCabe & Mrs. Miller (1971)
- Nashville (1975)
- Harold and Maude (1971)
- Shampoo (1975)
- Being There (1979)
- Minnie and Moskowitz (1971)
- Husbands (1970)
- Opening Night (1977)
- A Woman Under the Influence (1974)
- Alice Doesn't Live Here Anymore (1974)
- An Unmarried Woman (1978)
- Love and Death (1975)
- A New Leaf (1971)
- The Heartbreak Kid (1972)
- All That Jazz (1979)
- Cabaret (1972)
- The Rocky Horror Picture Show (1975)
- Saturday Night Fever (1977)
- Grease (1978)
- Barefoot in the Park (1967)
- Jeremiah Johnson (1972)
- The Sting (1973)
- The Great Gatsby (1974)
- The Way We Were (1973)
- The Candidate (1972)
- The Conversation (1974)
- The Parallax View (1974)
- Three Days of the Condor (1975)
- All the President's Men (1976)
- Network (1976)
- Rocky (1976)
- The Deer Hunter (1978)
- Coming Home (1978)
- Apocalypse Now (1979)
- The Exorcist (1973)
- Alien (1979)
- Star Wars (1977)
- Superman (1978)
- Heaven Can Wait (1978)
- The China Syndrome (1979)
- Norma Rae (1979)
- Breaking Away (1979)
- What's Up, Doc? (1972)
- A Clockwork Orange (1971)
- The Turning Point (1977)
- Monty Python and the Holy Grail (1975)
- Papillon (1973)
- Days of Heaven (1978)
- Sounder (1972)
- The Goodbye Girl (1977)
- Midnight Express (1978)
- Slap Shot (1977)
- The Outlaw Josey Wales (1976)
- The Paper Chase (1973)
- Save the Tiger (1973)
- California Split (1974)
- Carrie (1976)
- Willy Wonka & the Chocolate Factory (1971)
- New York, New York (1977)
- Kramer vs. Kramer (1979)
- Don't Look Now (1973)
- Julia (1977)
- Silver Streak (1976)
- The Bad News Bears (1976)
- Smokey and the Bandit (1977)
- Love Story (1970)
- Halloween (1978)
- Everything You Always Wanted to Know About Sex * But Were Afraid to Ask (1972)
- Bound for Glory (1976)
- Paper Moon (1973)

=== Episode 5: The Sixties ===
- West Side Story (1961)
- Exodus (1960)
- The Longest Day (1962)
- How the West Was Won (1962)
- Spartacus (1960)
- Lawrence of Arabia (1962)
- The Apartment (1960)
- Breakfast at Tiffany's (1961)
- Splendor in the Grass (1961)
- Lolita (1962)
- Cape Fear (1962)
- The Manchurian Candidate (1962)
- Vertigo (1958)
- North by Northwest (1959)
- Psycho (1960)
- Lover Come Back (1961)
- The Thrill of It All (1963)
- Pillow Talk (1959)
- Send Me No Flowers (1964)
- That Touch of Mink (1962)
- The Great Race (1965)
- The Pink Panther (1963)
- The Patsy (1964)
- The Ladies Man (1961)
- The Bellboy (1960)
- The Gold Rush (1925)
- The Cameraman (1928)
- The Errand Boy (1961)
- The Nutty Professor (1963)
- The Odd Couple (1968)
- What's Up, Tiger Lily? (1966)
- The Russians Are Coming! The Russians Are Coming! (1966)
- The Producers (1967)
- Dr. Strangelove or: How I Learned to Stop Worrying and Love the Bomb (1964)
- The Fall of the Roman Empire (1964)
- El Cid (1961)
- The Agony and the Ecstasy (1965)
- Tom Jones (1963)
- The Sand Pebbles (1966)
- The Lion in Winter (1968)
- Mutiny on the Bounty (1962)
- Becket (1964)
- A Man for All Seasons (1966)
- Jason and the Argonauts (1963)
- The Greatest Story Ever Told (1965)
- Doctor Zhivago (1965)
- Cleopatra (1963)
- My Fair Lady (1964)
- Mary Poppins (1964)
- The Sound of Music (1965)
- Funny Girl (1968)
- The Hustler (1961)
- Cat on a Hot Tin Roof (1958)
- Hud (1963)
- Cool Hand Luke (1967)
- Hombre (1967)
- Harper (1966)
- Charade (1963)
- Rio Bravo (1959)
- The Ugly American (1963)
- The Great Escape (1963)
- The Thomas Crown Affair (1968)
- The Cincinnati Kid (1965)
- Bullitt (1968)
- Dr. No (1962)
- From Russia with Love (1963)
- Goldfinger (1964)
- Thunderball (1965)
- You Only Live Twice (1967)
- The Misfits (1961)
- The Magnificent Seven (1960)
- Ride the High Country (1962)
- One-Eyed Jacks (1961)
- Sergeant Rutledge (1960)
- The Man Who Shot Liberty Valance (1962)
- A Fistful of Dollars (1964)
- The Good, the Bad and the Ugly (1966)
- Butch Cassidy and the Sundance Kid (1969)
- The Wild Bunch (1969)
- Cheyenne Autumn (1964)
- The Professionals (1966)
- Once Upon a Time in the West (1968)
- To Kill a Mockingbird (1962)
- The Defiant Ones (1958)
- A Patch of Blue (1965)
- A Raisin in the Sun (1961)
- Lilies of the Field (1963)
- Guess Who's Coming to Dinner (1967)
- To Sir, with Love (1967)
- In the Heat of the Night (1967)
- Night of the Living Dead (1968)
- Creature from the Black Lagoon (1954)
- Rosemary's Baby (1968)
- Planet of the Apes (1968)
- 2001: A Space Odyssey (1968)
- Who's Afraid of Virginia Woolf? (1966)
- Bonnie and Clyde (1967)
- Breathless (1960)
- The Graduate (1967)
- Easy Rider (1969)
- The Wild Angels (1966)
- Putney Swope (1969)
- Alice's Restaurant (1969)
- Downhill Racer (1969)
- Medium Cool (1969)
- They Shoot Horses, Don't They? (1969)
- Midnight Cowboy (1969)
- True Grit (1969)

=== Episode 6: The Golden Age ===
- The Great Train Robbery (1903)
- Intolerance: Love's Struggle Throughout the Ages (1916)
- Safety Last! (1923)
- Sherlock Jr. (1924)
- The Gold Rush (1925)
- The Son of the Sheik (1926)
- Sparrows (1926)
- It (1927)
- The Jazz Singer (1927)
- Lights of New York (1928)
- West of Broadway (1931)
- A Lady to Love (1930)
- The Kiss (1929)
- Anna Christie (1930)
- Grand Hotel (1932)
- Queen Christina (1933)
- Mutiny on the Bounty (1935)
- San Francisco (1936)
- Dracula (1931)
- Frankenstein (1931)
- Bride of Frankenstein (1935)
- The Mummy (1932)
- The Invisible Man (1933)
- The Wolf Man (1941)
- King Kong (1933)
- Monkey Business (1931)
- Animal Crackers (1930)
- Horse Feathers (1932)
- A Night at the Opera (1935)
- Duck Soup (1933)
- Gold Diggers of 1933 (1933)
- Footlight Parade (1933)
- 42nd Street (1933)
- Gold Diggers of 1935 (1935)
- Swing Time (1936)
- Steamboat Willie (1928)
- Snow White and the Seven Dwarfs (1937)
- Red-Headed Woman (1932)
- Blonde Crazy (1931)
- Laughing Sinners (1931)
- Baby Face (1933)
- She Done Him Wrong (1933)
- I'm No Angel (1933)
- Little Caesar (1931)
- The Public Enemy (1931)
- Scarface (1932)
- It Happened One Night (1934)
- My Man Godfrey (1936)
- Twentieth Century (1934)
- The Awful Truth (1937)
- Bringing Up Baby (1938)
- The Philadelphia Story (1940)
- His Girl Friday (1940)
- Symphony in Black: A Rhapsody of Negro Life (1935)
- Kid Millions (1934)
- The Little Colonel (1935)
- Blonde Venus (1932)
- Show Boat (1936)
- Body and Soul (1925)
- The Big House (1930)
- The Champ (1931)
- The Blue Angel (1930)
- Morocco (1930)
- The Devil Is a Woman (1935)
- The Petrified Forest (1936)
- Of Human Bondage (1934)
- Dangerous (1935)
- The Women (1939)
- Bubbles (1930)
- Love Finds Andy Hardy (1938)
- The Wizard of Oz (1939)
- Stagecoach (1939)
- Mr. Smith Goes to Washington (1939)
- Love Affair (1939)
- Ninotchka (1939)
- Of Mice and Men (1939)
- Only Angels Have Wings (1939)
- Goodbye, Mr. Chips (1939)
- Gunga Din (1939)
- Wuthering Heights (1939)
- Young Mr. Lincoln (1939)
- Gone with the Wind (1939)
- Possessed (1931)
- Manhattan Melodrama (1934)
- Red Dust (1932)
- Sullivan's Travels (1941)
- The Great McGinty (1940)
- The Lady Eve (1941)
- The Miracle of Morgan's Creek (1943)
- The Palm Beach Story (1942)
- Hail the Conquering Hero (1944)
- Unfaithfully Yours (1948)
- The Lodger: A Story of the London Fog (1927)
- The 39 Steps (1935)
- Rebecca (1940)
- Suspicion (1941)
- Notorious (1946)
- Rope (1948)
- Citizen Kane (1941)
- Triumph of the Will (1935)
- The Great Dictator (1940)
- Casablanca (1942)
- Wake Island (1942)
- Bataan (1943)
- Air Force (1943)
- The Battle of San Pietro (1945)
- The Battle of Midway (1942)
- They Were Expendable (1945)
- The Best Years of Our Lives (1946)
- It's a Wonderful Life (1946)
- The Maltese Falcon (1941)
- Double Indemnity (1944)
- Out of the Past (1947)
- Laura (1944)
- The Killers (1946)
- The Big Sleep (1946)
- The Third Man (1949)
- The Asphalt Jungle (1950)
- Gun Crazy (1950)
- The Hitch-Hiker (1953)
- Sunset BLVD. (1950)
- All About Eve (1950)
- Born Yesterday (1950)
- Samson and Delilah (1949)
- Quo Vadis (1951)
- The Robe (1953)
- The Ten Commandments (1956)
- Ben-Hur (1959)
- Singin' in the Rain (1952)
- The Hollywood Revue of 1929 (1929)
- Meet Me in St. Louis (1944)
- An American in Paris (1951)
- The Band Wagon (1953)
- A Star Is Born (1954)
- High Noon (1952)
- Conspirator (1949)
- The Thing from Another World (1951)
- Them! (1954)
- The Deadly Mantis (1957)
- Tarantula! (1955)
- I Married a Monster from Outer Space (1958)
- The Day the Earth Stood Still (1951)
- Godzilla: King of the Monsters! (1956)
- Gojira (1954)
- Invasion of the Body Snatchers (1956)
- On the Waterfront (1954)
- From Here to Eternity (1953)
- Roman Holiday (1953)
- Blackboard Jungle (1955)
- East of Eden (1955)
- Rebel Without a Cause (1955)
- Giant (1956)
- Gentlemen Prefer Blondes (1953)
- How to Marry a Millionaire (1953)
- The Seven Year Itch (1955)
- Some Like It Hot (1959)
- My Darling Clementine (1946)
- Fort Apache (1948)
- Rio Grande (1950)
- She Wore a Yellow Ribbon (1949)
- The Searchers (1956)
- Rear Window (1954)
- To Catch a Thief (1955)
- Vertigo (1958)
- North by Northwest (1959)
- City Lights (1931)
- All Quiet on the Western Front (1930)
- The Grapes of Wrath (1940)
- A Streetcar Named Desire (1951)
- The African Queen (1951)
- A Face in the Crowd (1957)
- Sweet Smell of Success (1957)
- The Bridge on the River Kwai (1957)
- Rio Bravo (1959)

Preceded by The 2000s	The Movies	Next: The 2010s
