= Enter the Anime =

2019 documentary film

- Film poster
- Directed by: Alex Burunova
- Written by: Julia Yorks; Meggy Garol
- Produced by: Alex Burunova; Estefanía Lee
- Starring: Shinji Aramaki; Kôzô Morishita; Yoko Takahashi
- Narrated by: Tania Nolan
- Cinematography: Yohei Tateishi
- Production company: Burunova Productions
- Distributed by: Netflix
- Release date: August 5, 2019
- Running time: 58 minutes
- Countries: United States; Japan
- Languages: English; Japanese

Enter the Anime is a 2019 Behind-the-Scenes Netflix special aimed at newcomers to anime to introduce them to anime titles on Netflix. The promotional special features interviews with some of the biggest anime stars like Kenji Kamiyama, Shinji Aramaki, Kozo Morishita, production houses like TOEI Animation and Polygon Pictures and IP like Aggretsuko, Evangelion and Ultraman, Kôzô Morishita and Yoko Takahashi, the creators behind well-known productions like Castlevania, Aggretsuko and Kengan Ashura. The special was released by Netflix on August 5, 2019.

== Plot ==
The film features interviews with individuals who worked on anime series licensed by Netflix. The first interviewee is Adi Shankar, who served as the executive producer for the anime-inspired Castlevania series. All participants have contributed to Netflix-licensed projects, with almost no mention of non-Netflix anime in the film.

== Release ==
Enter the Anime was released on August 5, 2019, on Netflix streaming.

== Reception ==
Enter the Anime was panned by anime fans who were expecting a documentary on the history of anime in this Behind the Scenes special, which was a promotional special aimed at familiarizing audiences with Netflix titles. John Serba, writing for Decider, stated, "Enter the Anime is such thinly disguised promotional content, it's like throwing a twin-sized bedsheet over a nuclear missile and insisting it's just a firecracker".
