= Dancing with the Birds =

2019 documentary film

- Directed by: Huw Cordey
- Narrated by: Stephen Fry
- Production company: Silverback Films
- Distributed by: Netflix
- Release date: October 23, 2019
- Running time: 51 minutes
- Country: United Kingdom
- Language: English

Dancing with the Birds is a 2019 documentary film directed by Huw Cordey and narrated by Stephen Fry. The premise revolves around the mating rituals of exotic birds, such as dancing or creating bowers with the right decorations. Dancing with the Birds was released on October 23, 2019, on Netflix.

== Featured birds ==
- Greater lophorina
- King of Saxony bird-of-paradise
- Black sicklebill
- Twelve-wired bird-of-paradise
- Flame bowerbird
- MacGregor's bowerbird
- Guianan cock-of-the-rock
- Lance-tailed manakin
- Carola's parotia
