= XY Chelsea =

2019 British documentary film

- Film poster
- Directed by: Tim Travers Hawkins
- Written by: Mark Monroe; Tim Travers Hawkins; Enat Sidi; Andrea B. Scott
- Produced by: Thomas Benski; Isabel Davis; Julia Nottingham; Lucas Ochoa
- Starring: Chelsea Manning
- Edited by: Enat Sidi; Andrea B. Scott
- Music by: Johnny Hostile; Jehnny Beth
- Production companies: Showtime Documentary Films; British Film Institute; Pulse Films; Topic Studios; Field of Vision; Faliro House Productions; 19340 Productions; Diamond Docs
- Distributed by: Showtime; Dogwoof
- Release dates: May 1, 2019 (Tribeca); May 24, 2019 (United Kingdom); June 7, 2019 (United States)
- Running time: 92 minutes
- Countries: United Kingdom; United States
- Language: English

XY Chelsea is a 2019 American-British documentary film directed by Tim Travers Hawkins, written by Travers Hawkins, Mark Monroe, Enat Sidi, and Andrea B. Scott. Laura Poitras serves as an executive producer. The film follows Chelsea Manning, after she is released from prison.

The film had its world premiere at the Tribeca Film Festival on May 1, 2019. It was released in the United Kingdom on May 24, 2019, by Dogwoof, and in the United States on June 7, 2019, by Showtime.

== Synopsis ==
The film follows Chelsea Manning, after she's released from prison, as she returns to activism, speaks to the press and runs for senate. Manning, Nancy Hollander, Vince Ward, Chase Strangio, Lisa Rein, Christina DiPasquale, Susan Manning, Janus Rose, and Kelly Wright appear in the film.

== Production ==
In January 2018, it was announced Showtime would produce and distribute the film, with Tim Travers Hawkins directing, with Laura Poitras set to executive produce.

== Release ==
The film had its world premiere at the Tribeca Film Festival on May 1, 2019. Prior to, Dogwoof acquired U.K. distribution rights to the film, and set it for a May 24, 2019, release. It was released in the United States on June 7, 2019.

== Reception ==
=== Critical reception ===
XY Chelsea holds a 65% approval rating on review aggregator website Rotten Tomatoes, based on 23 reviews, with an average of 5.9/10. On Metacritic, the film holds a rating of 60 out of 100, based on 9 critics, indicating "mixed or average reviews".
