= A 3 Minute Hug =

2019 documentary film

- Film poster
- Directed by: Everardo González
- Written by: Everardo González
- Production company: No Ficción
- Distributed by: Netflix
- Release date: October 28, 2019
- Running time: 28 minutes
- Countries: Mexico; United States
- Language: Spanish

A 3 Minute Hug is a 2019 documentary film directed and written by Everardo González. The premise revolves around the event that took place in May 2018 when the event "Hugs Not Walls" took place, organized by the Border Network For Human Rights. On this event, people from both sides of a dry embankment along the Rio Grande who are usually separated get a few minutes to reunite.

== Release ==
A 3 Minute Hug was released on October 28, 2019, on Netflix.
