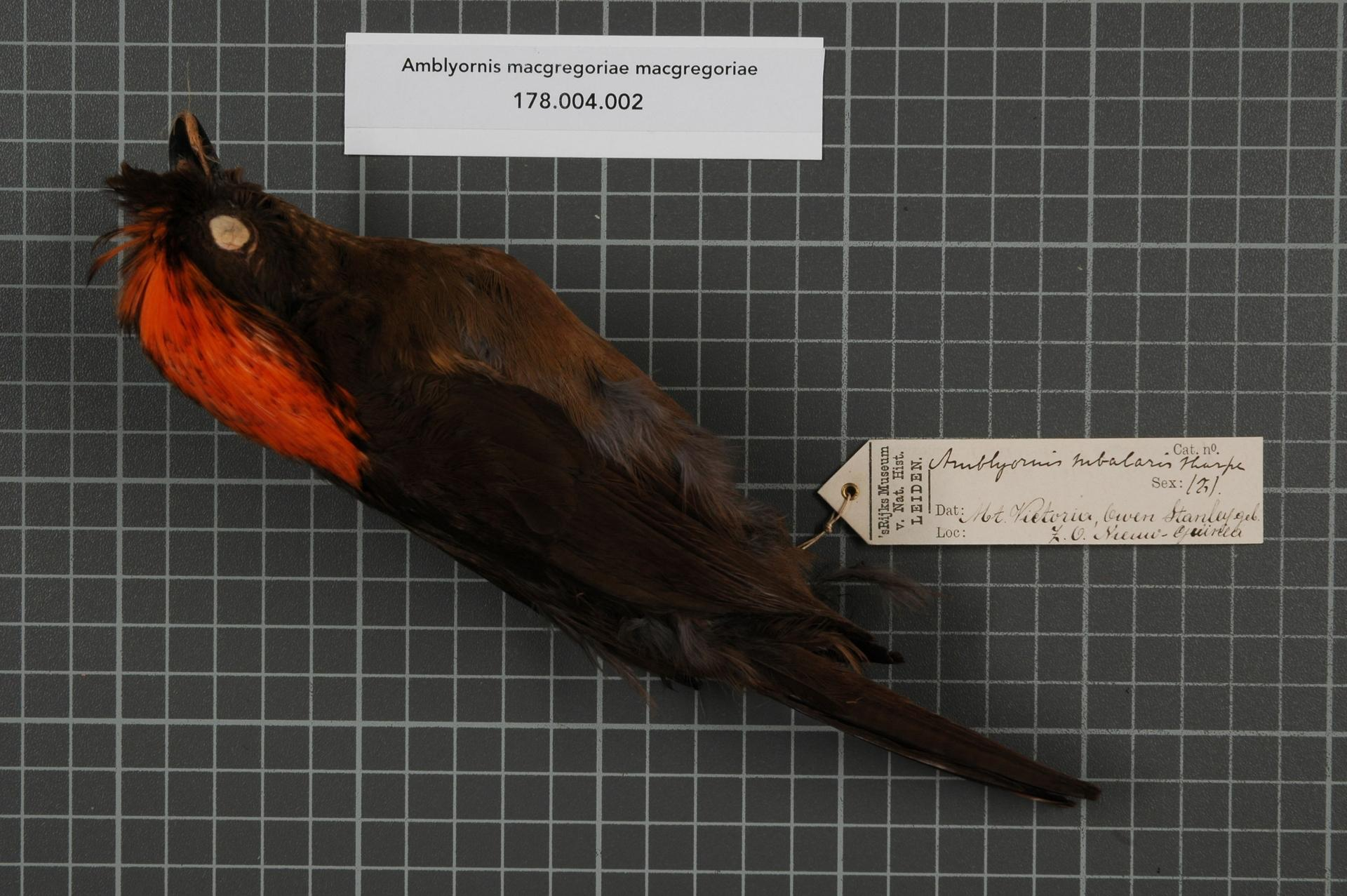
- Male specimen at the Naturalis Biodiversity Center.

Conservation status
- Least Concern (IUCN 3.1)

Scientific classification
- Kingdom: Animalia
- Phylum: Chordata
- Class: Aves
- Order: Passeriformes
- Family: Ptilonorhynchidae
- Genus: Amblyornis
- Species: A. macgregoriae

Binomial name
- Amblyornis macgregoriae De Vis, 1890

Synonyms
- Loria mariae

= MacGregor's bowerbird =

Species of bird

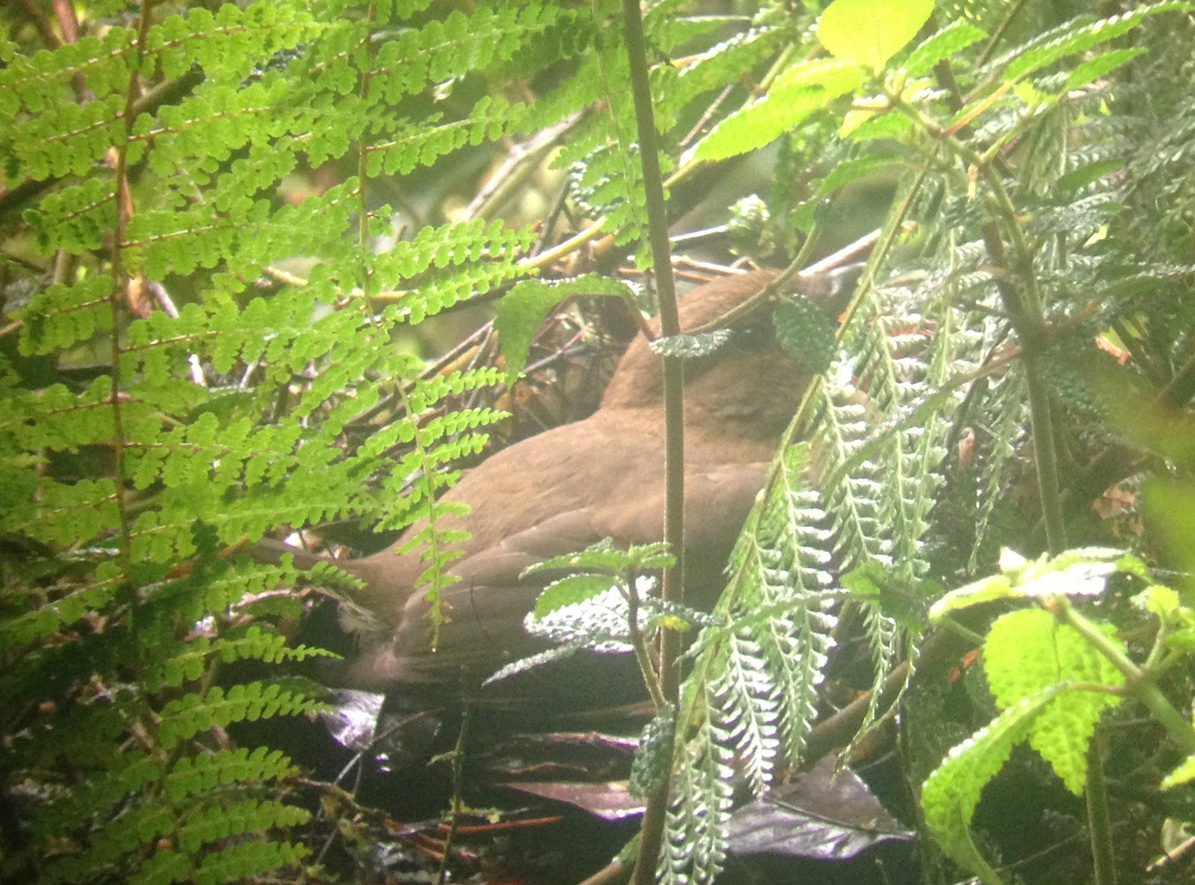
Subspecies of MacGregor's bowerbird, the Huon Bowerbird (Amblyornis macgregoriae germana)

MacGregor's bowerbird (Amblyornis macgregoriae) is a medium-sized, up to 26 cm long, olive brown bowerbird of New Guinea's mountain forests, roughly the size and shape of an American robin or a Eurasian blackbird. The male is adorned with an erectile orange yellow crest, that is partly hidden until shown in courtship display. The unadorned female is similar to the male, but without the crest. Superb mimics, they are known for imitating other birds, pigs, rushing water, and even human speech.

== Taxonomy ==
MacGregor's bowerbird was formally described in 1890 as Amblyornis macgregoriae by the English zoologist Charles Walter De Vis based on specimens collected in the Musgrave Range of southeast Papua New Guinea. The specific epithet was chosen to honour 'Lady Macgregor', wife of Sir William McGregor, Administrator of British New Guinea during 1888–98. Sir William's surname was originally, and thus formally, McGregor but he adopted the spelling MacGregor while in New Guinea as his personal preference.

Three subspecies are recognised:

- A. m. mayri Hartert, EJO, 1930 – montane west-central and central New Guinea (Weyland, Nassau, and Jayawijaya mountains)
- A. m. macgregoriae De Vis, CW, 1890 – montane east-central to northeastern (Adelbert Mountains) and southeastern New Guinea
- A. m. germanus Rothschild, LW, 1910 – mountains of Huon Peninsula (northeastern New Guinea)

The subspecies A. m. germanus has sometimes been considered as a separate species, the Huon bowerbird.

== Behaviour ==
The polygamous male builds a tower-like "maypole-type" bower, an elaborate courtship structure, with a central pole of twigs surrounded by a dish of moss with raised walls approximately 1 meter in diameter. He decorates the twigs of the maypole with flowers, fruits, insects and other objects. The diet consists mainly of fruits and insects.

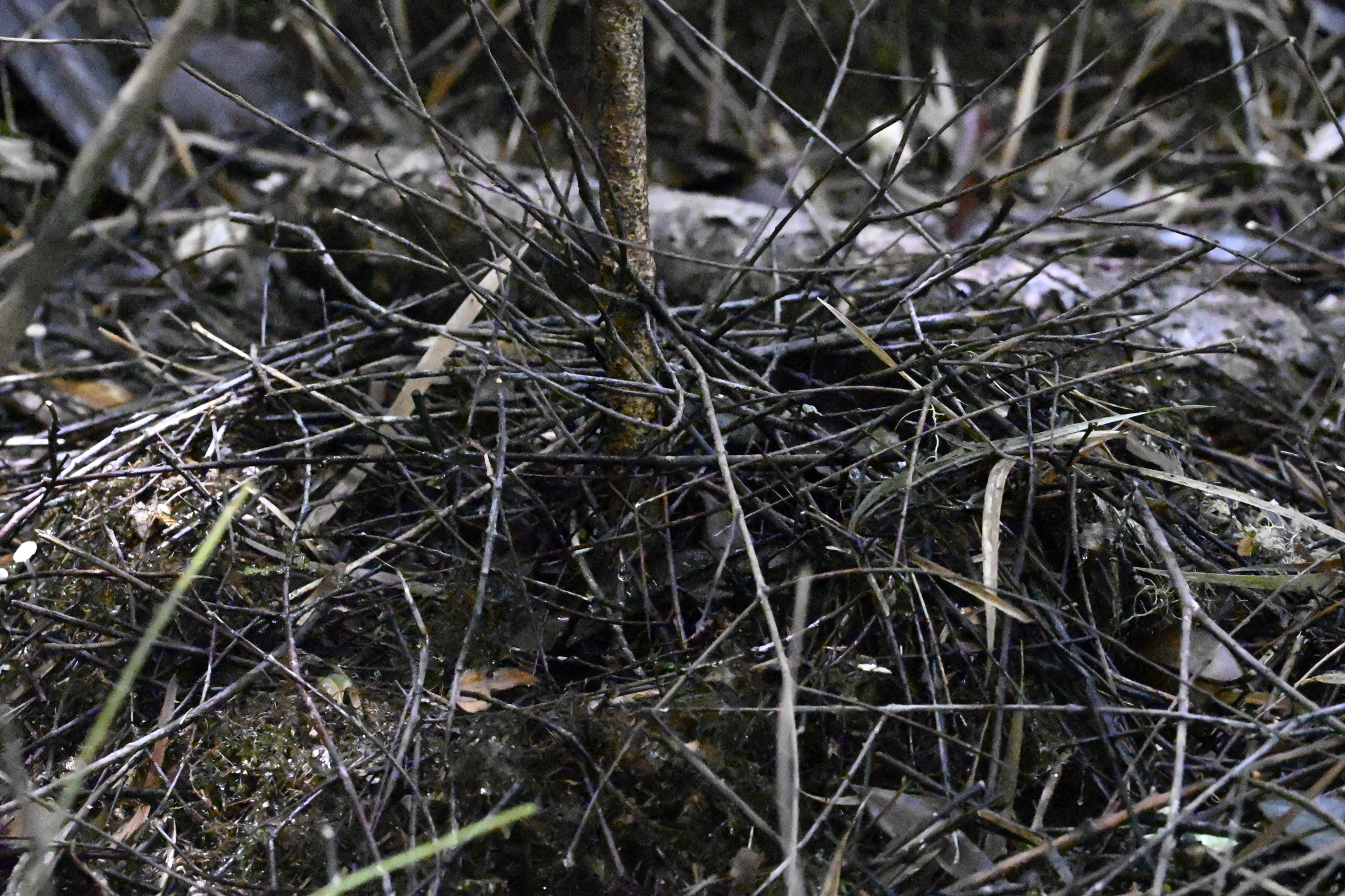
Remains of a MacGregor's Bowerbird bower

When a female comes in proximity to the bower, the male struts and calls, and opens his crest to display its full color. Hiding the crest except during sexual display is thought to minimize his vulnerability to predators.

== Conservation status ==
Widespread and common throughout its range, MacGregor's bowerbird is evaluated as Least Concern on the IUCN Red List of Threatened Species.
