= Parchis: The Documentary =

2019 documentary film

- Film poster
- Spanish: Parchís: El documental
- Directed by: Daniel Arasanz
- Written by: Daniel Arasanz; Jordi Meya
- Starring: Francisco Díaz; Tino Fernández; David Muñoz
- Distributed by: Netflix
- Release date: July 10, 2019
- Running time: 106 minutes
- Country: Spain
- Language: Spanish

Parchis: The Documentary (Spanish: Parchís: El documental) is a documentary about Parchis, a Spanish band with boys and girls who made a string of successful songs and films in the '80s, both in Spain and globally.

The documentary was released by Netflix on July 10, 2019.

== Premise ==
Parchis: The Documentary includes interviews with Yolanda, David, Tino, Oscar, Rodrigo, Gemma and Frank, as well as the group's managers. The film is focused on the success and downfall of the group.

== Cast ==
- Francisco Díaz
- Tino Fernández
- David Muñoz
- Gemma Termes Prat
- Yolanda Ventura
- Óscar Ferrer
