= The Legend of Cocaine Island =

2018 documentary film by Theo Love

- Directed by: Theo Love
- Produced by: Theo Love
- Starring: Bo Butterworth
- Distributed by: Netflix
- Release dates: April 20, 2018 (Tribeca Film Festival); March 29, 2019 (Netflix)
- Country: United States
- Language: English

The Legend of Cocaine Island is a 2018 documentary film, directed and produced by Theo Love. The film is produced under the banner of Sidestilt and is distributed by Netflix.

== Synopsis ==
A family man with no drug running experience searches the Caribbean island of Culebra for a lost stash of cocaine said to be worth at least $2 million.

== Cast ==
- Rodney Hyden as Rodney Hyden
- Andy Culpepper as Andy

== Reception ==
On review aggregator website Rotten Tomatoes, the film holds an approval rating of 78% based on 18 reviews, with an average rating of 5.9/10. The site's critical consensus reads, "Rodney Hyden's quixotic quest for riches makes The Legend of Cocaine Island a mirthful adventure, although director Theo Love's stylistic flourishes are often counterproductive in conveying the inherent interest of this true story." Adrian Horton of The Guardian wrote, "For one, hammy, winking re-enactments comprise a solid half, if not more, of the film, frequently pushing it toward the realm of dramedy, not always pleasantly". Michael Mckinney of FanBolt wrote, "Director Theo Love treats Rodney with respect and doesn’t make him the bad guy".
