= Back-to-school (period) =

Beginning of an academic year

- a Front of School Bus in Santa Rita
- Nickname: Return to the School
- Date: 1, January
- Frequency: annually

The Back-to-school is a period of the beginning of a new academic year, typically occurring in January or February, depending on the specific school's calendar. This period is characterized by students returning to school activities following their break.

== Origin ==
The return to classes is associated with the end of the school vacation period and the beginning of the academic year.

Its organization involves the planning of educational institutions, the preparation of school materials, and the arrangement of student transportation.

== Reception ==
The back-to-school period is typically marked by preparations among students and teachers at educational institutions for the start of school activities, and it is considered a hectic time.
