= Back to School (2019 film) =

French comedy film

- Directed by: Remy Four; Julien War
- Written by: Remy Four; Julien War
- Starring: Jérôme Niel; Ludovik Day; Nicolas Berno
- Production company: 2425 Films
- Distributed by: Netflix
- Release date: August 30, 2019
- Country: France
- Language: French

Back to School (French: La Grande Classe) is a French comedy film written and directed by Remy Four and Julien War. The plot revolves around two friends at their middle school reunion, eager to make an impression on old bullies and crushes.

The film was released on August 30, 2019 on Netflix.

== Cast ==
- Jérôme Niel
- Ludovik Day
- Nicolas Berno

== Release ==
Back to School was released on August 30, 2019 on Netflix.
