= Fire in Paradise =

2019 documentary film

- Film poster
- Directed by: Zackary Canepari; Drea Cooper
- Starring: Joy Beeson; Beth Bowersox; Abbie DavisHiyori Kon
- Distributed by: Netflix
- Release dates: September 1, 2019 (Telluride); November 1, 2019 (Netflix)
- Running time: 40 minutes
- Country: United States
- Language: English

Fire in Paradise is a 2019 documentary film directed by Zackary Canepari and Drea Cooper and starring Joy Beeson, Beth Bowersox and Abbie DavisHiyori Kon.

== Summary ==
The film focuses on the 2018 wildfire in Paradise, California, the deadliest and most destructive wildfire in California history.

== Release ==
Fire in Paradise premiered at the 2019 Telluride Film Festival. It also showed at the 2019 Hamptons International Film Festival, where it won the Audience Award for Best Short Film. and was released on November 1, 2019, on Netflix.
