= Leopoldo =

Leopoldo is a given name, the Italian, Spanish, and Portuguese form of the English, German, Dutch, Polish, and Slovene name, Leopold.

Notable people with the name include:

- Leopoldo de' Medici (1617–1675), Italian cardinal and Governor of Siena
- Leopoldo Andara (born 1986), Venezuelan swimmer
- Leopoldo Baracco (1886–1966), Italian politician
- Leopoldo Batres (1852–1926), Mexican archaeologist
- Leopoldo Bersani (1848–1903), Italian painter
- Leopoldo Bertrand (born 1943), Spanish military engineer and politician
- Leopoldo Borda Roldan (1898–1977), Colombian engineer
- Leopoldo Bravo (1919–2006), Argentine politician
- Leopoldo Brizuela (1963–2019), Argentine journalist
- Leopoldo Alfredo Bravo (1960–2010), Argentine diplomat
- Leopoldo Brenes, Nicaraguan Roman Catholic cardinal
- Leopoldo Burlando (1841–1915), Italian painter
- Leopoldo Calvo-Sotelo (1926–2008), Spanish politician
- Leopoldo Contarbio (1927–1993), Argentine basketball player
- Leopoldo Conti (1901–1970), Italian footballer
- Leopoldo da Gama (1843–1929), Goan journalist and writer
- Leopoldo Diokno, Filipino militant
- Leopoldo O'Donnell (1809–1867), Spanish general
- Leopoldo Elia (1925–2008), Italian politician
- Leopoldo Federico (1927–2014), Argentine bandoneon player
- Leopoldo Felíz Severa, Puerto Rican politician
- Leopoldo Fernández (Tres Patines) (1904–1985), Cuban comedian
- Leopoldo Figueroa (1887–1969), Puerto Rican politician
- Leopoldo Franchetti (1847–1917), Italian publicist
- Leopoldo da Gaiche, Italian Catholic priest
- Leopoldo Galtieri (1926–2003) Argentine general and dictator from 1981 to 1982
- Leopoldo González González, Mexican archbishop
- Leopoldo Jaucian, Filipino Catholic bishop
- Leopoldo López Escobar (1940–2013), Chilean geochemist
- Leopoldo López Mendoza (born 1971), Venezuelan politician and economist
- Leopoldo Lugones (1874–1938), Argentine statesman
- Leopoldo Luque (1949–2021), Argentine footballer
- Leopoldo Maggi, Italian physician
- Leopoldo Marechal (1900–1970), Argentine writer
- Leopoldo Mastelloni (born 1945), Italian actor
- Leopoldo Melo (1869–1951), Argentine lawyer, diplomat and politician
- Leopoldo Méndez, Mexican graphic artist
- Leopoldo Menéndez, Spanish military officer
- Leopoldo Moreau (born 1946), Argentine politician
- Leopoldo Mugnone, Italian conductor
- Leopoldo Ortín (1893–1953), Peruvian actor
- Leopoldo Ortiz Climent, Spanish engineer
- Leopoldo María Panero, Spanish poet
- Leopoldo Presas (1915-2009), Argentine artist
- Leopoldo Ramos Giménez(1891–1988), Paraguayan intellectual
- Leopoldo Rubinacci (1903–1969) Italian politician and lawyer
- Leopoldo Ruiz, Argentina golfer
- Leopoldo Prato (1845–1896), Italian major
- Leopoldo Sánchez Celis (1916–1989), Mexican politician
- Leopoldo Sucre Figarella (1926–1996), Venezuelan politician and engineer
- Leopoldo Toniolo (1833–1908), Italian painter
- Leopoldo Torre Nilsson (1924–1978), Argentine film director
- Leopoldo Torres Ríos (1899–1960), Argentine film director
- Leopoldo Verona (1931–2014), Argentine actor
- Leopoldo Zunini, Italian diplomat
