= Jonathan Demme filmography =

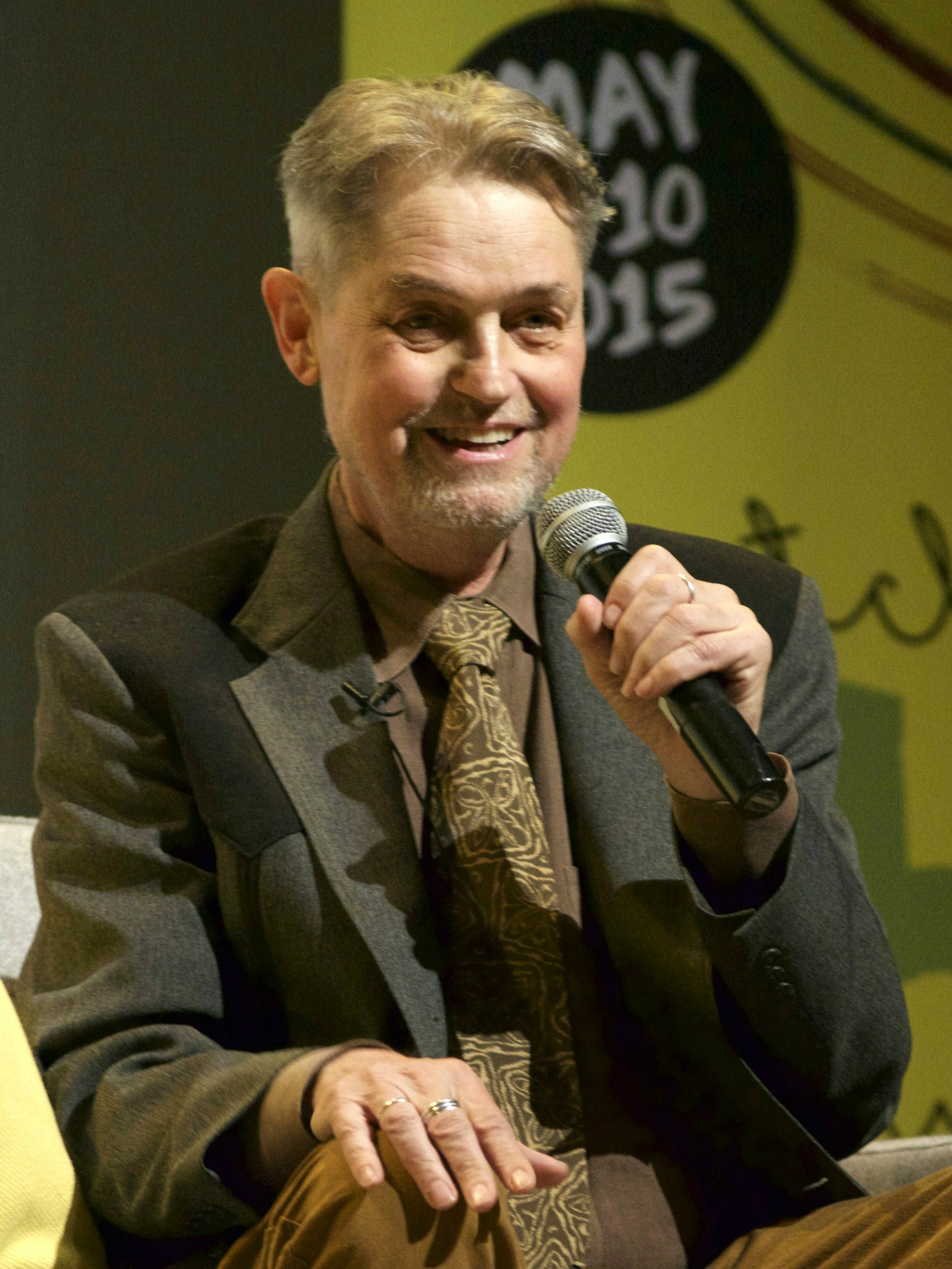
Jonathan Demme in 2015

Jonathan Demme was an American film director, producer and screenwriter of film and television.

== Film ==
Year	Title	Credited as			Notes
Year	Title	Director	Producer	Writer	Notes
1971	Angels Hard as They Come	No	Yes	Yes	
1972	The Hot Box	Second Unit	Yes	Yes	
1973	Fly Me	Second Unit	No	No	
1973	Black Mama White Mama	No	No	Story	
1973	Naughty Wives (aka Secrets of a Door-to-Door Salesman)	Yes	No	No	directed opening sequence
1974	Caged Heat	Yes	No	Yes	
1975	Crazy Mama	Yes	No	No	
1976	Fighting Mad	Yes	No	Yes	
1977	Handle with Care	Yes	No	No	originally titled Citizens Band
1979	Last Embrace	Yes	No	No	
1980	Melvin and Howard	Yes	No	No	
1984	Swing Shift	Yes	No	No	
1986	Something Wild	Yes	Yes	No	
1988	Married to the Mob	Yes	No	No	
1990	Miami Blues	No	Yes	No	
1991	The Silence of the Lambs	Yes	No	No	
1991	Women & Men 2	No	Yes	No	
1993	Philadelphia	Yes	Yes	No	
1993	Amos & Andrew	No	Executive	No	
1993	Household Saints	No	Executive	No	
1994	Roy Cohn/Jack Smith	No	Executive	No	
1995	Devil in a Blue Dress	No	Executive	No	
1996	That Thing You Do!	No	Yes	No	
1997	Ulee's Gold	No	Yes	No	
1998	Beloved	Yes	Yes	No	
1998	Shadrach	No	Executive	No	
1999	The Opportunists	No	Executive	No	
2001	Maangamizi: The Ancient One	No	Executive	No	
2002	The Truth About Charlie	Yes	Yes	Yes	
2002	The Manchurian Candidate	Yes	Yes	No	
2002	Adaptation.	No	Yes	No	
2006	The Goodbye Kiss	No	Yes	No	
2008	Rachel Getting Married	Yes	Yes	No	
2009	Crude Independence	No	Executive	No	
2013	A Master Builder	Yes	No	No	
2012	Gimme the Loot	No	Yes	No	
2014	Song One	No	Yes	No	
2015	Ricki and the Flash	Yes	No	No	
2015	The Center	No	Executive	No	

== Documentary ==
Year	Title	Credited as			Notes
Year	Title	Director	Producer	Writer	Notes
1984	Stop Making Sense	Yes	No	Yes	Concert film; also re-recording supervisor
1987	Haiti: Dreams of Democracy	Yes	Yes	Yes	
1987	Swimming to Cambodia	Yes	No	No	Concert film
1992	Cousin Bobby	Yes	No	No	
1994	The Complex Sessions	Yes	No	No	Concert film
1994	One Foot on a Banana Peel, the Other Foot in the Grave: Secrets from the Dolly Madison Room 1994	No	Yes	No	
1996	Mandela	No	Yes	No	
1998	Storefront Hitchcock	Yes	No	No	Concert film
1998	The Uttmost	No	Yes	No	
2003	The Agronomist	Yes	Yes	Yes	Also cinematographer
2003	Beah: A Black Woman Speaks	No	Yes	No	
2006	Neil Young: Heart of Gold	Yes	No	No	Concert-documentary film; also camera operator
2007	Man from Plains	Yes	Yes	No	Also camera operator
2007	Right to Return: New Home Movies From the Lower 9th Ward	Yes	Yes	No	
2009	Neil Young Trunk Show	Yes	No	No	Concert-documentary film
2009	Joe and Linda Flooded Out of Holy Cross	Yes	No	No	released in Issue #10 of Wholphin
2010	Foul Deeds	Yes	No	No	Pegi Young concert film
2011	I'm Carolyn Parker	Yes	Yes	No	Also cinematographer
2011	Neil Young Journeys	Yes	Yes	No	Concert-documentary film
2012	Kenny Chesney: Unstaged	Yes	No	No	Concert film
2012	Enzo Avitabile Music Life	Yes	Yes	No	
2013	Everett Ruess Wilderness Song	No	Yes	No	
2014	Brothers of the Black List	No	Yes	No	Presenter
2015	Deep Time	No	Yes	No	
2015	What's Motivating Hayes	Yes	No	No	Short film; segment in The New Yorker Presents
2015	Another Telepathic Thing	Yes	No	No	Concert film
2016	Justin Timberlake + The Tennessee Kids	Yes	No	No	Concert film
2016	Protection Not Protest: The People of Standing Rock	Yes	No	No	Short film
2017	The Power of Rock	Yes	Yes	No	Compilation film made of Rock and Roll Hall of Fame performances
2019	Last Disintegrated School	No	Yes	No	
2022	Her Magnum Opus	No	Yes	No	Presenter

== Television ==
Year	Title	Credited as			Notes
Year	Title	Director	Writer	Producer	Notes
1978	Columbo	Yes	No	No	Episode "Murder Under Glass"
1980–86	Saturday Night Live	Yes	Yes	No	3 episodes
1982	American Playhouse	Yes	No	No	Episode "Who Am I This Time?"
1986	Alive from Off Center	Yes	No	No	Episode "Trisha Brown's Accumulation with Talking Plus Watermotor"
1987	Trying Times	Yes	No	No	Episode "A Family Tree"
1997	Subway Stories	Yes	No	Yes	Segment "Subway Car from Hell"
1998	The Oprah Winfrey Show	Yes	No	No	Episode "The Cast of Beloved"
2010	Tavis Smiley Reports	Yes	No	No	News program; segment "Been In The Storm Too Long"
2011	Enlightened	Yes	No	No	2 episodes
2011	A Gifted Man	Yes	No	Yes	Episode "Pilot"
2013–14	The Killing	Yes	No	No	2 episodes
2014	Line of Sight	Yes	No	Yes	Unaired pilot
2017	Shots Fired	Yes	No	No	Episode "Hour Six: The Fire This Time"
2018	Seven Seconds	Yes	No	No	Episode "Brenton's Breath" (Posthumous release)

== Music video ==
Year	Title	Artist
1979	"Gidget Goes to Hell"	Suburban Lawns
1985	"Sun City" (with Godley & Creme)	Artists United Against Apartheid
1985	"Everybody's Young"	Sandra Bernhard
1985	"The Perfect Kiss"	New Order
1985	"I Got You Babe"	UB40 and Chrissie Hynde
1987	"Solitude Standing"	Suzanne Vega
1988	"Away"	The Feelies
1989	"Sister Rosa"	The Neville Brothers
1990	"In the Still of the Night" (segment in Red Hot + Blue)	The Neville Brothers
1991	"Heal Yourself" (executive director; directed with Ted Demme, Fab 5 Freddy, and Pamm Jenkins)	H.E.A.L.
1993	"Streets of Philadelphia" (with Ted Demme)	Bruce Springsteen
1995	"Murder Incorporated"	Bruce Springsteen
2000	"If I Should Fall Behind"	Bruce Springsteen
2004	"Rich Man's War"	Steve Earle

== Acting roles ==
Year	Title	Role	Notes
1977	The Incredible Melting Man	Matt Winters	
1979	Last Embrace	Man on Train	
1985	Into the Night	Federal Agent	
1996	That Thing You Do!	Producer of That Thing You Do! Director of Weekend At Party Pier	
2000	Oz	Commercial Director	
2015	I Thought I Told You to Shut Up	Narrator	Short documentary
