= Bersani (surname) =

Bersani is an Italian surname. Notable people with the surname include:

- Gianfranco Bersani (1919–1965), Italian basketball player
- Giovanni Bersani (1914–2014), Italian politician
- Giuseppina Bersani (1949–2023), Italian fencer
- Leo Bersani (1931–2022), American literary theorist and Professor Emeritus
- Leonard F. Bersani (1932–2000), American politician
- Leopoldo Bersani (1848–1903), Italian painter and sculptor
- Pier Luigi Bersani (born 1951), Italian politician
- Samuele Bersani (born 1970), Italian singer-songwriter

== See also ==
- Bersano
