= That Thing You Do! (soundtrack) =

That Thing You Do! (Original Motion Picture Soundtrack)

Soundtrack album by the Wonders
- Released: September 24, 1996
- Genre: Pop • Rock • Power pop • Jangle pop • Jazz
- Length: 42:09
- Labels: Playtone; Epic

That Thing You Do! (Original Motion Picture Soundtrack) is the soundtrack to the 1996 film That Thing You Do!, directed by Tom Hanks. Released under the Playtone and Epic Records label on September 24, 1996, the album featured songs performed by the fictional band The Wonders and other artists. The soundtrack and the song named after the film's title written by Adam Schlesinger and co-performed by Mike Viola was a commercial success, with the former peaking at number 21 on the Billboard 200. The song itself was nominated for Academy and Golden Globe Awards.

== Reception ==
Cub Koda of AllMusic wrote: "If you're a fan of mid-'60s British pop, here's a new recording that adds some more great songs and performances to that genre."

== Vinyl edition ==
On September 6, 2023, Mondo and Playtone Records announced the vinyl edition of the film's soundtrack with pre-orders on the same date. The LP record is made available in numerous colors, which includes the standard black, retail exclusive opaque red, and the "Gold Nugget" variant, and a Mondo exclusive clear variant with multi-color splatter that was made available on the company's official website. The vinyl editions limited to 500 copies were published from Enjoy The Ride Records, and was released during the fall of 2023, priced at $40.

== Track listing ==
That Thing You Do! (Original Motion Picture Soundtrack) track listing
No.	Title	Music	Artist	Length
1.	"Lovin' You Lots and Lots"	Tom Hanks	The Norm Wooster Singers	1:54
2.	"That Thing You Do!"	Adam Schlesinger	The Wonders	2:47
3.	"Little Wild One"	David Gibbs, Steve Hurley, Phil Hurley, Fred Elringham	The Wonders	2:30
4.	"Dance with Me Tonight"	Scott Rogness, Rick Elias	The Wonders	2:05
5.	"All My Only Dreams"	Rogness, Elias	The Wonders	2:54
6.	"I Need You (That Thing You Do)" (The movie credits list this song as being from the Heardsmen.)	Rogness, Elias, Linda Elias	The Wonders	2:53
7.	"She Knows It"	Rogness, Elias	The Heardsmen	3:01
8.	"Mr. Downtown"	Hanks, Gary Goetzman, Mike Piccirillo	Freddy Fredrickson	2:32
9.	"Hold My Hand, Hold My Heart"	Hanks, Goetzman, Piccirillo	The Chantrellines	3:11
10.	"Voyage Around the Moon"	Hanks, Goetzman, Piccirillo	The Saturn 5	3:04
11.	"My World Is Over"	Piccirillo	Diane Dane	3:01
12.	"Drive Faster"	Rogness, Elias	The Vicksburgs	2:48
13.	"Shrimp Shack"	Piccirillo	Cap'n Geech & the Shrimp Shack Shooters	2:22
14.	"Time To Blow"	Steve Tyrell, Robert Mann	Del Paxton	4:20
15.	"That Thing You Do!" (live at the Hollywood Television Showcase)	Schlesinger	The Wonders	2:54
Total length:				42:09

== Chart performance ==
Chart performance for That Thing You Do! (Original Motion Picture Soundtrack)
Chart (1996–1997)	Peak position
UK Compilation Albums (OCC)	38
US Billboard 200	21

== Certifications ==
Certifications for That Thing You Do! (Original Motion Picture Soundtrack)
Region	Certification	Certified units/sales
Canada (Music Canada)	Gold	50,000^{^}
United States (RIAA)	Platinum	1,000,000^{‡}
^{^} Shipments figures based on certification alone.^{‡} Sales+streaming figures based on certification alone.

== Accolades ==
Accolades for That Thing You Do! (Original Motion Picture Soundtrack)
Award	Category	Nominee(s)	Result
Academy Awards	Best Original Song	"That Thing You Do!"; Music and Lyrics by Adam Schlesinger	Nominated
Florida Film Critics Circle Awards	Best Song	"That Thing You Do!"; Music and Lyrics by Adam Schlesinger	Won
Golden Globe Awards	Best Original Song	"That Thing You Do!"; Music and Lyrics by Adam Schlesinger	Nominated
Online Film & Television Association Awards	Best Original Song	"That Thing You Do!"; Music and Lyrics by Adam Schlesinger	Nominated
Satellite Awards	Best Original Song	"That Thing You Do!"; Music and Lyrics by Adam Schlesinger	Nominated
