= Burlando =

Burlando is a surname of Italian origin. Notable people with the surname include:

- Claudio Burlando (born 1954), Italian politician
- Giovanna Burlando (born 1969), Italian synchronized swimmer
- Leopoldo Burlando (1841–1915), Italian painter
- Luigi Burlando (1899–1967), Italian footballer and manager
