= Colegio de la Inmaculada (Gijón) =

Location
- Hermanos Felgueroso 25. 33205; Gijón, Asturias; Spain

Information
- Type: Private
- Motto: Ad maiorem Dei gloriam
- Established: 1890
- Rector: Antonio España Sánchez, S.J.
- Principal: Alfredo Flórez Cienfuegos-Jovellanos, S.J.
- Faculty: 71
- Grades: 1–12
- Colors: White and light blue
- Mascot: Macu
- Nickname: Macus
- Yearbook: Catálogo
- Affiliation: Catholic (Jesuit)
- Website: www.colegioinmaculada.es
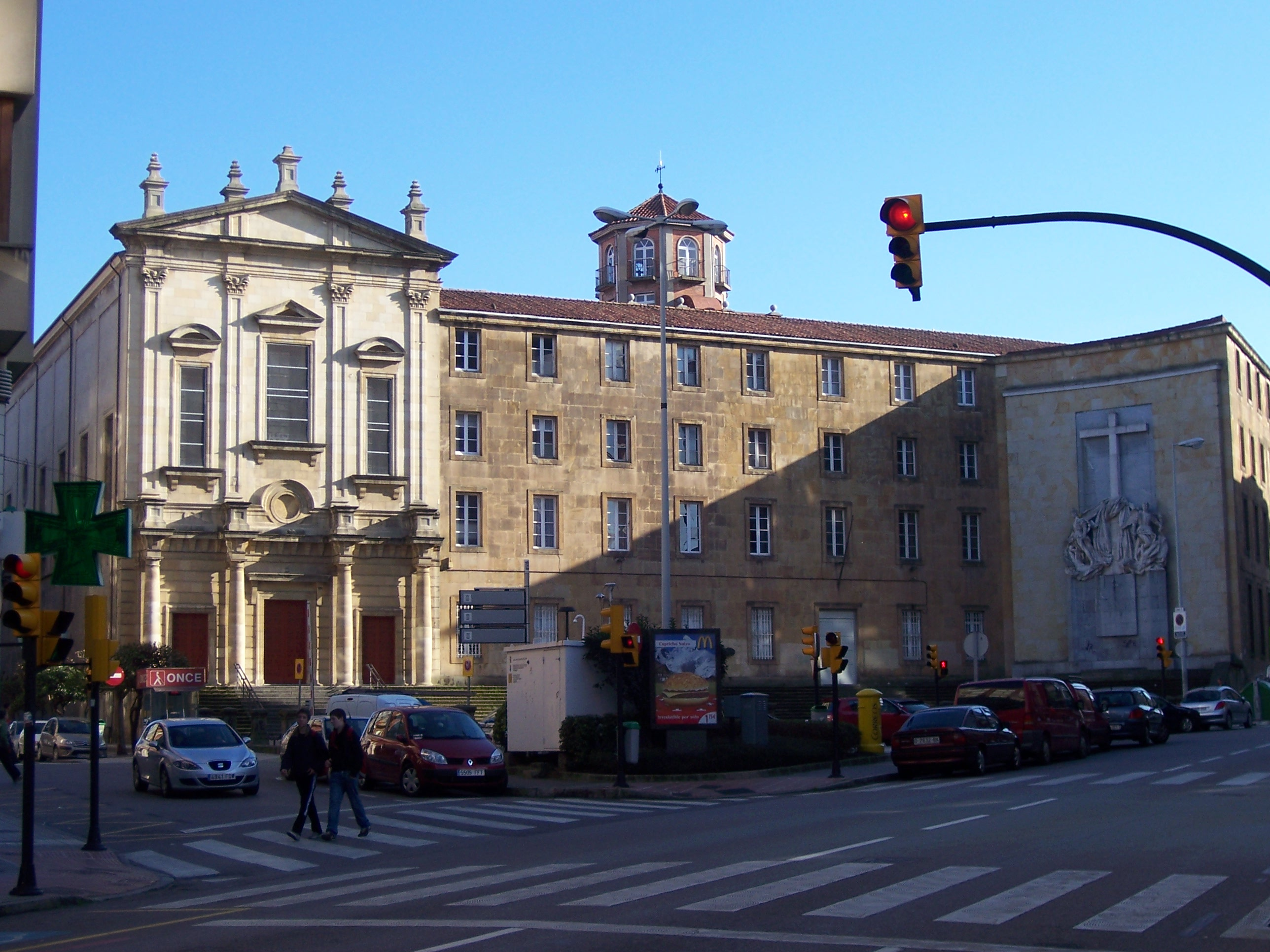
- Main building

Colegio de la Inmaculada (Immaculate Conception's College in English) is a Catholic school for primary and secondary education (grades 1 to 12) run by the Jesuits in Gijón, Spain since 1890.

== History ==
Established on the outskirts of the city of Gijón by the Society of Jesus at the end of the 19th century, it used to be a boys' school. Since 1972, it's a coeducational institution with about the same ratio of boys and girls. During the Spanish Civil War it was totally destroyed. The current facilities were reconstructed in 1941.

The school was visited by the following Superiors General of the Society of Jesus:

- 1924: Wlodimir Ledóchowski, S.J.
- 1970: Pedro Arrupe, S.J.
- 2013: Adolfo Nicolás, S.J.

== Extracurricular activities ==
=== Athletics ===
The soccer program has an outstanding history of success, with several national championship titles and many players turning professional, including some international caps with the national team like Eloy, Manjarín or Bango. Basketball, handball and roller hockey teams also keep excellent winning records.

The school has two olympic gold medalists, Javier Manjarín in soccer (1992) and Ángela Pumariega in sailing (2012).

=== Magazine ===
The school's magazine, "Páginas escolares", was first published on June 29, 1904, and it was the first ever journal published at a Jesuit school in the world. It is now the oldest running school journal in Spain.

== Exchange programs ==
The school keeps exchange programs for teachers and students with St Aloysius' College, Glasgow and Kolleg St. Blasien.

== Colors ==
School colors are light blue and white, traditional colors of the cape and tunic of the Immaculate Conception. Athletic uniforms are white and light blue, while warm-up clothing is black, like the Jesuit cassock.

== Songs ==
The singing of the school's anthem is a tradition on every important celebration carried out at the school.

== Headmasters ==
Headmaster	Years
Domingo María Landa, S.J.	1890-1898
Ramón María Vinuesa, S.J.	1898-1903
Buenaventura Recalde, S.J.	1903-1909
Cesareo Ibero, S.J.	1909-1915
Baltasar Irigoyen, S.J.	1915-1919
Claudio García Herrero, S.J.	1919-1922
Manuel Gómez Aparicio, S.J.	1922-1925
Leandro Brunet, S.J.	1925-1930
Valerio Agüero, S.J.	1930-1932
José María Riaza, S.J.	*1942-1947
Jesús Villameriel, S.J.	1947-1953
Enrique von Riedt, S.J.	1953-1959
José María Colodrón, S.J.	1959-1963
Juan Lamamie de Clairac, S.J.	1963-1966
Nicolás Rodríguez Verastegui, S.J.	1966-1972
Laureano Cuesta, S.J.	1972-1975
Pedro Menéndez Cifuentes, S.J.	1975-1981
Carlos Lozano, S.J.	1981-1987
Isidro González Modroño, S.J.	1987-1990
Joaquin Barrero Díaz, S.J.	1990-1996
Jesús Manuel Díaz Baizán, S.J.	1996-1998
Emilio Vega Pérez, S.J.	1998-2000
Carlos Lozano Gutiérrez, S.J.	2000-2004
Jesús Manuel Díaz Baizán, S.J.	2004-2009
Antonio España Sánchez, S.J.	2009-

- 1932–1942 the school was closed due to Spanish Civil War.

== Notable alumni ==
- Ramón Pérez de Ayala, writer.
- Torcuato Fernández-Miranda, former prime minister of Spain.
- Leopoldo Bertrand, naval engineer and politician
- Emilio Botín, banker, executive chairman of Grupo Santander.
- Pedro de Silva, politician, former president of the Principality of Asturias.
- Juan Suárez Botas, illustrator.
- Enrique Figaredo, S.J., Jesuit, apostolic prefect of Battambang.
- Eloy, former international soccer player.
- Manjarín, former international soccer player and olympic gold medalist.
- Ángela Pumariega, sailor and Olympic gold medalist.

== See also ==
- List of Jesuit sites
