= Playtone =

American film and television production company

The Playtone Company
- Formerly: Clavius Base Productions (1987-1998)
- Type: Private
- Industry: Film production Television production
- Founded: July 10, 1987; 39 years ago (as Clavius Base Productions); January 23, 1998; 28 years ago (registered as Playtone) in Santa Monica, California, United States
- Founders: Tom Hanks
- Headquarters: Santa Monica, California, United States
- Key people: Tom Hanks (CEO); Rita Wilson Hanks (CFO)
- Products: Motion pictures Television programs
- Owner: Tom Hanks
- Subsidiaries: Playtone Records
- Website: Official website

The Playtone Company (stylized on-screen as PLAY•TONE; a.k.a. Playtone Productions, formerly Clavius Base Productions) is an American film and television production company established in 1987 and registered on January 23, 1998 by actor Tom Hanks and producer Gary Goetzman, and based in Santa Monica, California.

The company was named after the fictional record company of the same name in the 1996 film That Thing You Do!, written and directed by Hanks; it also uses the same company logo, typically revealed on-screen with a brief instrumental snippet of the titular song itself, with some variations in each film depending on subject matter. The success of the film served as a spring-board to launch an actual Playtone Records label that year, with its first release being the film's soundtrack.

== History ==
In 1987, Tom Hanks formed his own production company, Clavius Base Productions, with a non-exclusive, first-look deal at the Walt Disney Studios. The company is named after the base from 2001: A Space Odyssey. After five years at Disney, the company signed a first-look deal with 20th Century Fox in 1992.

Although it was an in-name only operation, the company only produced one film under the original company name, the hit film That Thing You Do!, which inspired the later Playtone name. In 1995, the company produced the expensive HBO miniseries and its first foray into television, From the Earth to the Moon, in collaboration with Imagine Television, which was aired in 1998 and beginning of a long-running relationship between the company and HBO.

The success of the movie led Hanks to partner with Gary Goetzman, then of Jonathan Demme's production firm, to sign a deal with Universal Pictures in 1997, and eventually registered under the Playtone name, supplanting the earlier Clavius Base firm and adopted the firm, previously used for the Playtone Records label. The company then scored its hit with another HBO miniseries, Band of Brothers, which was released in 2001.

== Filmography ==
=== Feature films ===
Year	Film	Directed by	Co-production(s)	Distributor(s)
Released films
as Clavius Base
1996	That Thing You Do!	Tom Hanks	Clinica Estetico	20th Century Fox
as Playtone
2000	Cast Away	Robert Zemeckis	ImageMovers	20th Century Fox (North America); DreamWorks Pictures (International)
2002	My Big Fat Greek Wedding	Joel Zwick	Gold Circle Films, HBO Films and MPH Entertainment	IFC Films
2004	The Polar Express	Robert Zemeckis	Castle Rock Entertainment, ImageMovers and Shangri-La Entertainment	Warner Bros. Pictures
2005	Magnificent Desolation: Walking on the Moon	Mark Cowen	—	IMAX
2006	Neil Young: Heart of Gold	Jonathan Demme	Reprise Records and Shangri-La Entertainment	Paramount Classics
2006	The Ant Bully	John A. Davis	DNA Productions and Legendary Pictures	Warner Bros. Pictures
2006	Starter for 10	Tom Vaughan	BBC Films, HBO Films and Neal Street Productions	Picturehouse (United States); Icon Film Distribution (United Kingdom)
2007	Charlie Wilson's War	Mike Nichols	Participant Productions and Relativity Media	Universal Pictures
2008	The Great Buck Howard	Sean McGinly	Bristol Bay Productions and Walden Media	Magnolia Pictures
2008	Mamma Mia!	Phyllida Lloyd	Relativity Media and Littlestar	Universal Pictures
2008	City of Ember	Gil Kenan	Walden Media	20th Century Fox
2009	My Life in Ruins	Donald Petrie	—	Fox Searchlight Pictures
2009	Where the Wild Things Are	Spike Jonze	Legendary Pictures and Village Roadshow Pictures	Warner Bros. Pictures
2011	Larry Crowne	Tom Hanks	Vendôme Pictures	Universal Pictures
2013	Parkland	Peter Landesman	American Film Company	Exclusive Media Group
2016	My Big Fat Greek Wedding 2	Kirk Jones	Gold Circle Films and HBO Films	Universal Pictures
2016	A Hologram for the King	Tom Tykwer	X-Filme Creative Pool and Primeridian Entertainment	Lionsgate Films; Roadside Attractions; Saban Films
2017	The Circle	James Ponsoldt	Image Nation Abu Dhabi and Likely Story	EuropaCorp; STX Entertainment
2018	Mamma Mia! Here We Go Again	Ol Parker	Legendary Pictures and Littlestar	Universal Pictures
2020	Greyhound	Aaron Schneider	Sony Pictures, Stage 6 Films, Bron Studios, FilmNation Entertainment, Sycamore Pictures and Zhengfu Pictures	Apple TV+
2020	News of the World	Paul Greengrass	Pretty Pictures	Universal Pictures (United States); Netflix (International)
2023	A Man Called Otto	Marc Forster	Columbia Pictures, Stage 6 Films, SF Studios, Artistic Films, 2DUX², Big Indie and STXfilms	Sony Pictures Releasing
2023	My Big Fat Greek Wedding 3	Nia Vardalos	Gold Circle Films and HBO Films	Focus Features
2024	The Bloody Hundredth	Mark Herzog; Laurent Bouzereau	Amblin Television and Herzog & Co.	Apple TV+

=== Series ===
==== Television series ====
Year(s)	Title	Created by	Co-production(s)	Distributor	Original network
Released series
1998	From the Earth to the Moon	Andrew Chaikin	Imagine Television	Warner Bros. Television	HBO
2001	Band of Brothers	Tom Hanks and Steven Spielberg	DreamWorks Television	Warner Bros. Television	HBO
2003	My Big Fat Greek Life	Nia Vardalos and Marsh McCall	Brad Grey Productions / Marsh McCall Productions	Sony Pictures Television	CBS
2006–2011	Big Love	Mark V. Olsen and Will Scheffer	Anima Sola Productions	Warner Bros. Television	HBO
2008	John Adams	David Coatsworth and Steve Shareshian	High Noon Productions / Mid Atlantic Films	Warner Bros. Television	HBO
2010	The Pacific	Steven Spielberg, Tom Hanks and Gary Goetzman	DreamWorks Television	Warner Bros. Television	HBO
2012	Game Change	Mark Halperin and John Heilemann	HBO Films	Warner Bros. Television	HBO
2014	Olive Kitteridge	Elizabeth Strout	As Is Productions	Warner Bros. Television	HBO
2014	The Sixties	Tom Hanks, Gary Goetzman and Mark Herzog	Herzog & Company	Warner Bros. Television	CNN
2015	The Seventies	Tom Hanks, Gary Goetzman and Mark Herzog	Herzog & Company	Warner Bros. Television	CNN
2016	The Eighties	Tom Hanks, Gary Goetzman and Mark Herzog	Herzog & Company	Warner Bros. Television	CNN
2017	The Nineties	Tom Hanks, Gary Goetzman and Mark Herzog	Herzog & Company	Warner Bros. Television	CNN
2018	The 2000s	Tom Hanks, Gary Goetzman and Mark Herzog	Herzog & Company	Warner Bros. Television	CNN
2019	The Movies	Tom Hanks, Gary Goetzman and Mark Herzog	Herzog & Company	Warner Bros. Television	CNN
2023	The 2010s	Tom Hanks, Gary Goetzman and Mark Herzog	Herzog & Company	Warner Bros. Television	CNN
2024	Masters of the Air	John Shiban and John Orloff	Amblin Television / Apple Studios	Apple Inc.	Apple TV+

==== Web series ====
Year(s)	Title	Created by	Co-production(s)	Distributor	Original Network
2012	Electric City	Tom Hanks	6 Point Harness / Reliance Entertainment	Yahoo!	Yahoo! Screen

== Playtone Records releases ==
- That Thing You Do! soundtrack (1996)
- The Sopranos soundtrack (1999)
- Bring It On soundtrack (2000)
- The Sopranos: Peppers & Eggs soundtrack (2001)
- Josie and the Pussycats soundtrack (2001)
- Band of Brothers soundtrack (2001)
- My Big Fat Greek Wedding soundtrack (2002)
- The Truth About Charlie soundtrack (2002)
- Starter for 10 soundtrack (2006)

== See also ==
- List of record labels
