= Edward Saxon =

American film producer (born 1956)

- Born: Edward Bradley Saxon; November 17, 1956 (age 69); St. Louis, Missouri, U.S.
- Occupation: Film producer

Edward Bradley Saxon (born November 17, 1956) is an American film producer and endowed Chair of the Peter Stark Producing Program at the USC School of Cinematic Arts. The best known film Saxon produced was The Silence of the Lambs.

== Early life ==
Saxon was born and raised in St. Louis, Missouri, and educated at Kirkwood High School from 1972 to 1976.

He studied at McGill University from 1976 to 1980. While at McGill, he founded the Tuesday Night Cafe Theatre with Veronica Brady and Peter Grossman, and the company is still running today. Saxon acted in many plays at the Players' Theatre, McGill's famous Red and White Review. He also founded a radio comedy troupe called The Circle Jerks.

He then studied at the Peter Stark Producing Program at the USC School of Cinematic Arts.

== Career ==
Originally an actor, Saxon was one of VH1's first VJ's in New York City.

As Jonathan Demme's producing partner, his films included Beloved, Ulee's Gold, That Thing You Do!, The Truth About Charlie, Married to the Mob, Miami Blues and Philadelphia.

The best known film that Saxon produced was The Silence of the Lambs, which won the Academy Award for Best Picture, and is, to date, the third and last film to sweep the five main categories of Academy Award for Best Actor, Best Actress, Best Adapted Screenplay, Best Director, and Best Picture. (The others are It Happened One Night and One Flew Over the Cuckoo's Nest.) He has made several cameos in the films he has produced, most notably as a head in a jar in Silence of the Lambs.

After parting ways with Demme, Saxon produced Charlie Kaufman and Spike Jonze's Adaptation.. He produced Richard Linklater's Fast Food Nation in 2006. More recent projects include Away We Go, directed by Sam Mendes, and Our Family Wedding, starring Forest Whitaker and America Ferrera.

In 2021, Saxon was named Chair of Peter Stark Producing Program at the USC School of Cinematic Arts. In his appointment, Saxon noted that the Stark program “changed my life.” He added: “Making great stories requires a complex skillset in this transformative time. Building on the legacy of Ray Stark, Art Murphy, and Larry Turman, I'm looking forward to working with our world-class teaching professionals to give students the knowledge and attitudes they need to succeed in marrying commerce and art.”

== Filmography ==
He was a producer in all films unless otherwise noted.

=== Film ===
| Year | Film | Credit |
|---|---|---|
| 1986 | Something Wild | Executive producer |
| 1988 | Married to the Mob | |
| 1990 | Miami Blues | Executive producer |
| 1991 | The Silence of the Lambs | |
| 1993 | Philadelphia | |
| 1995 | Devil in a Blue Dress | Executive producer |
| 1996 | That Thing You Do! | |
| 1997 | Ulee's Gold | Executive producer |
| 1998 | Beloved | |
| 1999 | The Opportunists | Executive producer |
| 2002 | The Truth About Charlie | |
| 2002 | Adaptation | |
| 2006 | Fast Food Nation | Executive producer |
| 2009 | Away We Go | |
| 2010 | Our Family Wedding | |
| 2014 | Elsa & Fred | |

As an actor

| Year | Film | Role | Notes |
|---|---|---|---|
| 1986 | Something Wild | Kevin Stroup | |
| 1990 | Miami Blues | Krishna Ravindra at Miami Airport | |
| 1991 | The Silence of the Lambs | Benjamin Raspail (Head in a Jar) | Uncredited |
| 1994 | The Ref | Reporter | |
| 1998 | Beloved | Man with Rubbery Face | Uncredited |

Thanks

| Year | Film | Role |
|---|---|---|
| 1993 | Household Saints | Thanks |
| 1996 | Some Mother's Son | Special thanks |
| 2005 | Me and You and Everyone We Know | Special thanks |
| 2009 | Where the Wild Things Are | Special thanks |
| 2021 | Music | The producers wish to thank |

=== Television ===
| Year | Title | Credit | Notes |
|---|---|---|---|
| 1988 | Haiti Dreams of Democracy | Executive producer | Documentary |
| 1991 | Women & Men 2 | Co-producer | Television film |
| 1997 | Subway Stories | Executive producer | Television film |
| 2011 | Enlightened | Co-executive producer | |
| 2016−19 | Ray Donovan | Co-executive producer | |

As an actor

| Year | Title | Role | Notes |
|---|---|---|---|
| 1991 | Women & Men 2 | Ad Man | Television film |
