= Justin Timberlake + The Tennessee Kids =

2016 concert film by Jonathan Demme

- Film poster
- Directed by: Jonathan Demme
- Produced by: Gary Goetzman
- Starring: Justin Timberlake
- Cinematography: Declan Quinn
- Edited by: Paul Snyder
- Production company: Playtone
- Distributed by: Netflix
- Release date: October 12, 2016
- Running time: 90 minutes
- Country: United States
- Language: English

Justin Timberlake + The Tennessee Kids is a 2016 concert film starring American singer Justin Timberlake and directed by Jonathan Demme, his final directorial work before his death in April 2017. It first premiered at the 2016 Toronto International Film Festival on September 13, 2016, and was released globally on Netflix on October 12. The film depicts Timberlake as he performs songs from his first four studio albums during his fifth concert tour, The 20/20 Experience World Tour, at the MGM Grand Garden Arena in Las Vegas. Filmed over two nights, January 1–2, 2015, Justin Timberlake + The Tennessee Kids received widespread critical acclaim, with praise for Demme's filmmaking and Timberlake's performance.

== Synopsis ==
The film opens with Justin Timberlake's arrival at the MGM Grand Garden Arena. Before taking the stage, the focus is directed at the Tennessee Kids, Timberlake's 25-piece ensemble consisting of backup singers, dancers, drummers, guitarists, and a full brass section, as each member is introduced individually.

The film consists of an uninterrupted, 90-minute showcase of Timberlake's final performance in The 20/20 Experience World Tour. Timberlake, dressed in a custom tuxedo by Tom Ford, leads the arena through a setlist featuring various tracks. The performance leans heavily on his solo discography, highlighted by tracks from his second studio album, FutureSex/LoveSounds, as well as a cover of Michael Jackson's "Human Nature".

Throughout the show, the camera captures the collaboration among the performers on stage rather than solely on Timberlake. The film's highlights include Timberlake interacting with the crowd, shifting to acoustic instrumentation, and accepting a mid-set shot of tequila from his longtime producer, Timbaland. The film concludes with a backstage look at the post-show celebration.

== Cast ==
- Justin Timberlake
- Adam Blackstone
- Justin Gilbert
- Aaron Anderson
- Lance Jefferson
- Terry Santiel
- Elliott Ives
- Mike Scott
- Dontae Winslow
- Sean Erick
- Kevin Williams
- Leon Silva
- Zenya Bashford
- Aaron Camper
- Nicole Hurst
- Jack E. King
- Dana Wilson
- Ivan Koumaev
- Lyle Beniga
- Natalie Gilmore
- Matthew Aylward
- Lindsay Richardson

== Background and production ==
On May 5, 2013, Timberlake announced that he would embark on The 20/20 Experience World Tour, his fifth concert tour and second on a global scale. Promoted primarily by Live Nation, the tour would debut on October 31 in Montreal. Twenty-two additional dates were also announced across Canada and the United States, ending on February 10, 2014, in Omaha, Nebraska. Several dates were made available for pre-sale for members of The Tennessee Kids, Timberlake's official fan club. Timberlake's official website noted that, while unannounced, additional dates in Europe, South America, and Australia would follow. In his autobiography Hindsight, Timberlake wrote that he ended the tour early after learning that his wife, Jessica Biel, was pregnant. The tour concluded with a performance at the MGM Grand Garden Arena in Las Vegas on January 2, 2015.

Jonathan Demme contacted Timberlake after seeing his performance in the film The Social Network; they discussed Talking Heads' concert film Stop Making Sense, which was directed by Demme and influenced Timberlake's live performances. The performance captured in Justin Timberlake + The Tennessee Kids was filmed over two nights, January 1–2, 2015. Demme used 14 operated cameras that cinematographer Declan Quinn deployed over many pre-filming engagements, including two other free-floating cameras in the audience and one cameraman onstage. Timberlake dedicated the film to Prince, who died during post-production.

== Release and reception ==
Netflix announced its acquisition of Justin Timberlake + The Tennessee Kids shortly before it premiered at the 2016 Toronto International Film Festival on September 13, 2016. The film premiered worldwide on Netflix on October 12, 2016. On the review aggregator website Rotten Tomatoes, 100% of 14 critics' reviews are positive, with an average rating of 8.2/10. Metacritic, which uses a weighted average, assigned the film a score of 81 out of 100, based on 6 critics, indicating "universal acclaim".

Noel Murray of The A.V. Club gave the film an "A−" grade, calling Timberlake "a stunner" and highlighting his dancing during "Suit & Tie" and his emotional performance of "Mirrors". Nigel M. Smith of The Guardian, who gave the film four out of five stars, similarly wrote that Timberlake is "only truly in his element when on stage being a showman". David Ehrlich of IndieWire gave the film a "B" grade and praised its presentation of the "musicianship, artistry, and sheer athleticism of pop music". Brian Tallerico of RogerEbert.com, who gave the film 3.5 out of four stars, described Jonathan Demme's concert films as "cinematic embodiments" of musicianship, while Andrew Barker of Variety wrote that Demme's direction makes the film "more than just a fans-only proposition". Manuela Lazic of Little White Lies called it a "joyous experience" and said it demonstrated that Demme and Timberlake remained "at the top of their game".

Adam Chitwood of Collider, who gave it an "A−" grade, contrasted Demme's direction with the possibility of the film becoming "one long promo for Justin Timberlake: The Brand", instead describing the finished film as "pure art". Ethan Vestby of The Film Stage, however, gave the film a "B−" grade and viewed it as potentially a "for-hire work from Demme", while also questioning whether the film's subject being so "in-control" limited Demme's role as an author. Calum Marsh of the National Post likewise praised the special's ability to offer more than the entertainment of a live concert, asking whether it could "achieve anything more" before answering in the affirmative. Renee Longstreet of Common Sense Media, who gave it four out of five stars, characterized it as "a nonstop musical extravaganza" without the banter or guest performers that often feature in concert films. David Rooney of Billboard said that although concert films cannot match the experience of attending live concerts, Justin Timberlake + The Tennessee Kids "will more than satisfy the Timberlake faithful".

== Set list ==
Set list adapted from What's on Netflix.

1. "Pusher Love Girl"
2. "Gimme What I Don't Know (I Want)" / "Rock Your Body"
3. "Don't Hold the Wall" / "FutureSex/LoveSound"
4. "Like I Love You"
5. "My Love"
6. "LoveStoned"
7. "Until the End of Time"
8. "Holy Grail" / "Cry Me a River"
9. "Only When I Walk Away"
10. "Drink You Away"
11. "Let the Groove Get In"
12. "Human Nature"
13. "What Goes Around... Comes Around"
14. "Take Back the Night"
15. "Poison"
16. "Suit & Tie"
17. "SexyBack"
18. "Mirrors"
