= That Thing You Do! (song) =

1996 single

"That Thing You Do"

Single by the Wonders

from the album That Thing You Do!: Original Motion Picture Soundtrack
- B-side: "Voyage Around the Moon (The Saturn 5)" (cassette); "Dance with Me Tonight" (45); "All My Only Dreams" (fictitious 45 from the film)
- Released: September 24, 1996
- Genre: Power pop
- Length: 2:46
- Label: Playtone/Epic
- Songwriter: Adam Schlesinger

"That Thing You Do" is the main song from the 1996 film That Thing You Do! Written by Adam Schlesinger, the song is performed by the fictional 1960s band the Wonders, who are the focus of the film. The song peaked at No. 41 on the Billboard Hot 100 and was nominated for an Academy Award and a Golden Globe Award for Best Original Song in 1997.

== Film appearance ==
In the film's storyline, "That Thing You Do" is written and first performed in 1964 by Erie, Pennsylvania-based band the Oneders (meant to be a homophone of "Wonders", but pronounced "Oh-nee-ders" by nearly everyone). Written by guitarist/vocalist Jimmy Mattingly II (though lead guitarist Lenny Haise claims co-authorship), it is originally crafted as a ballad, but during its first live performance at a local talent show, newly-recruited drummer Guy Patterson produces a much more up-tempo beat, turning the song from a ballad into an upbeat, Beatles-esque pop-rock number. They win the talent show, and from there, the band is picked up by a local manager who helps them get more shows in the area and gets the song onto the radio. The band is signed to Play-Tone Records (changing their name to the more accessible The Wonders), and under new manager Amos White's guidance, the song becomes the quickest-charting song ever on Play-Tone Records, racing up to No. 7. Despite their success, Jimmy walks out on the band before they can produce another record, leaving them one-hit wonders.

In the film, the song is performed by James "Jimmy" Mattingly II on lead vocals and guitar, Leonard "Lenny" Haise on lead guitar and backing vocals, "T.B. Player" on bass and backing vocals, (Note: As a running gag, the bass player in the film is unnamed. However the soundtrack's liner notes—written as if it were a real-life compilation of the Playtone label's greatest hits—gives the bass player's name as "T.B. Player") and Guy "Shades" Patterson on drums. For their live performance of the song on The Hollywood Television Showcase, studio bassist Scott "Wolfman" Pell replaced T.B. Player on bass and backing vocals.

In the fictitious "mockumentary" liner notes from the film soundtrack CD, it is stated that "That Thing You Do" peaked at number 2 on the Billboard Hot 100 during the summer of 1964.

== In reality ==
The song was written by Adam Schlesinger, the bassist of the alternative rock group Fountains of Wayne. Schlesinger did not expect his song to be chosen, but tried as "a personal exercise." Performers include Mike Viola on vocals with Schlesinger on backup vocals.

The song was released as a single, and although not as successful as was depicted in the film, the track still did moderately well in the US, peaking for three weeks at number 41 on the Billboard Hot 100 in November 1996. (It also reached number 22 on the Adult Contemporary chart, number 18 on the Adult Top 40, and number 24 on the Top 40 Mainstream chart.) The song also reached number 50 in Australia.

The song was a bigger hit outside of the US, reaching number 31 in Canada in December 1996, and number 22 on the UK Singles Chart in February 1997. The song was nominated for Best Original Song at the 69th Academy Awards as well as Best Original Song at the 54th Golden Globe Awards, losing out on both occasions to Madonna's "You Must Love Me" (written by Tim Rice and Andrew Lloyd Webber) from the musical Evita.

On April 25, 2017, three quarters of the actors who played the Wonders—Tom Everett Scott (Guy "Shades" Patterson), Johnathon Schaech (Jimmy Mattingly II) and Ethan Embry ("T.B. Player")—performed the song live during a surprise appearance at the Roxy in Los Angeles. The occasion was the Goddamn Comedy Jam, a live show series in which comedians tell funny stories about a meaningful song and then perform it with a live band. Comedian and show creator Josh Adam Meyers persuaded the actors to perform the song with him. After initial hesitation on Scott's part, Meyers managed to persuade him with help from The After Jam producer Jason Gallagher, who happened to be Scott's brother-in-law. The other actors soon followed suit, with Gallagher helping them learn how to play the instruments. Steve Zahn (Lenny Haise) was unable to participate due to living in Kentucky; comedian Jeremiah Watkins took his place on lead guitar while wearing a cut-out mask of Zahn's face. On April 10, 2017, Embry posted a video of himself playing the song's bass line; it is now apparent that the video was a teaser for the event two weeks later.

== Charts ==
Chart performance for "That Thing You Do"
Chart (1996–1997)	Peak position
Australia (ARIA)	50
Canada RPM Adult Contemporary	33
Canada RPM Top Singles	31
Estonia Airplay (Eesti Top 15)	5
Germany (GfK)	90
Iceland (Íslenski Listinn Topp 40)	19
UK Singles (OCC)	22
US Billboard Hot 100	41
US Billboard Adult Contemporary	22
US Billboard Adult Top 40	18
US Billboard Top 40 Mainstream	24

== Personnel ==
- Mike Viola – vocals, guitar, hand claps
- Adam Schlesinger – backing vocals, guitar, bass guitar, drums, hand claps

== Cover versions ==
- The Knack included a version on their 1998 compilation album Proof - The Very Best of The Knack.
- New Found Glory covered the song in their 2000 EP From the Screen to Your Stereo.
- In 2010, the song was parodied by The Fringemunks to recap Fringe episode 3.03, "The Plateau."
- Pentatonix performed the song at the 2014 Kennedy Center Honors, paying tribute to Tom Hanks, the writer and director of That Thing You Do!.
- Cheekface contributed a cover of the song for the compilation album Saving for a Custom Van, a tribute to Adam Schlesinger.
- Billie Joe Armstrong recorded a version for his 2020 album No Fun Mondays.
