= Women & Men 2 =

- Genre: Drama
- Written by: Walter Bernstein; Mike Figgis; Kristi Zea; Carson McCullers ("A Domestic Dilemma"); Henry Miller ("Mara"); Irwin Shaw ("Return to Kansas City")
- Directed by: Walter Bernstein; Mike Figgis; Kristi Zea
- Starring: Matt Dillon; Kyra Sedgwick; Ray Liotta; Andie MacDowell; Scott Glenn; Juliette Binoche
- Music by: Anton Sanko; Suzanne Vega
- Country of origin: United States
- Original language: English

Production
- Producers: David Brown; Jonathan Demme; William S. Gilmore
- Cinematography: Jean-François Robin; Richard Quinlan; Tony C. Jannelli
- Editor: Andrew Mondshein
- Running time: 90 minutes
- Production company: HBO Showcase

Original release
- Network: HBO
- Release: August 18, 1991

Women and Men 2 is the second installment of HBO's made-for-television short films based on works by American authors, following Women & Men: Stories of Seduction. The three short films include "A Domestic Dilemma", written by Carson McCullers, starring Ray Liotta and Andie MacDowell; "Return to Kansas City" by Irwin Shaw with Matt Dillon and Kyra Sedgwick; and "Mara" by Henry Miller with Juliette Binoche and Scott Glenn.

== Directors ==
The short film "A Domestic Dilemma" marked the directorial debut of Hollywood designer Kristi Zea. Director Mike Figgis later complained that his short film featuring Juliette Binoche had been "butchered".

== Cast ==
- Matt Dillon as Eddie Megeffin
- Kyra Sedgwick as Arlene Megeffin
- Ray Liotta as Martin Meadows
- Andie MacDowell as Emily Meadows
- Scott Glenn as Henry
- Juliette Binoche as Mara
- Jerry Stiller as Irving
- Jared Harris as Joey Patrick
- Jane Krakowski as Melba
- Michael Galeota as Andy Meadows
- Sloane Shelton as Secretary
- Paul Lazar as Ad Man
- Jerry Mayer as Ad Man
- Edward Saxon as Ad Man
- Ron Vawter as Ad Man
- Stephen Mendillo as The Bartender
- Marine Delterme as Prostitute
- Ariane as Alice
- Bill Corsair as Radio Announcer
