= Florida Film Critics Circle Awards 1996 =

Annual US film awards ceremony

1st FFCC Awards

Best Film:
Fargo

The 1st Florida Film Critics Circle Awards honoured the best in film for 1996.

== Winners ==
- Best Film:
  - Fargo
  - Runner-up: Breaking the Waves
- Best Actor:
  - Geoffrey Rush - Shine
  - Runner-up: Tom Cruise - Jerry Maguire
- Best Actress:
  - Frances McDormand - Fargo
  - Runner-up: Brenda Blethyn - Secrets & Lies
- Best Supporting Actor:
  - Edward Norton - The People vs. Larry Flynt, Everyone Says I Love You and Primal Fear
  - Runner-up: William H. Macy - Fargo
- Best Supporting Actress:
  - Courtney Love - The People vs. Larry Flynt
  - Runner-up: Joan Allen - The Crucible
- Best Director:
  - Joel Coen - Fargo
- Best Screenplay:
  - Joel and Ethan Coen - Fargo
- Best Cinematography:
  - John Seale - The English Patient
- Best Foreign Language Film:
  - Ridicule • France
- Best Newcomers:
  - Doug Liman (director) and Jon Favreau (actor/writer) - Swingers
- Best Song:
  - "That Thing You Do" - That Thing You Do!
- Golden Orange for Outstanding Contribution to Film:
  - The 15 African-American men who pooled their resources to finance Get on the Bus.
  - The Walt Disney Co., for standing up to protests concerning the content of its films by Chinese authorities and the Southern Baptist Convention.
