= Juan Suárez Botas =

- Born: April 3, 1958; Gijón, Spain
- Died: 24 August 1992 (aged 34); Manhattan, New York, US
- Occupations: Illustrator, film director
- Years active: 1981–1992

Juan Suárez Botas (3 April 1958 – 24 August 1992) was a Spanish illustrator and film maker. His illustrations appeared on the covers of Time, Fortune, U.S. News & World Report and other magazines. His drawings appeared in The New York Times, Vogue and other publications.

Botas moved to the United States from Spain in 1977. He studied at Syracuse University and studied and worked with the graphic designer Milton Glaser. He died of AIDS in August 1992. He was directing a documentary about his AIDS treatment group at the time of his death, which was released as One Foot on a Banana Peel, the Other Foot in the Grave: Secrets from the Dolly Madison Room. He was a friend of The Silence of the Lambs director Jonathan Demme and his illness and treatment for AIDS were a major influence on Demme's decision to make the film Philadelphia.
