= Leopoldo Ortiz Climent =

Spanish engineer and politician

Leopoldo Ortiz Climent (Catadau, Spain, 1941) is a Spanish engineer and politician who belongs to the People's Party (PP).

Married with three children, he qualified as an engineer and worked in the agriculture section of the Spanish Embassy in London from 1972 to 1976. He later entered politics as a member of the regional party Valencian Union (Unió Valenciana / UV) and headed the party list at the 1987 European elections in Spain but failed to be elected. He subsequently joined the PP and in 1989 was elected to the European Parliament as a PP MEP, part of the European People's Party. He resigned his seat in 1993 after being elected to the Spanish Congress of Deputies representing Valencia Province. After serving one term in the lower house he was elected to the Spanish Senate for one term from 1996 to 2000 again representing Valencia Province.
