= Bersano =

Bersano is a surname. Notable persons with that surname include:

- Fernando Bersano (born 1998), Argentine professional footballer
- Matt Bersano (born 1992), American professional soccer player

== See also ==
- Bersani
