= Leopoldo Alfredo Bravo =

Argentine diplomat (1960–2010)

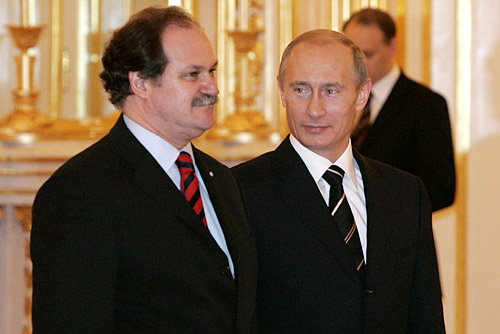
Ambassador Bravo with the Prime Minister of Russia, Vladimir Putin.

Leopoldo Alfredo Bravo (30 July 1960 – 30 October 2010) was an Argentine politician and diplomat.

The son of Leopoldo Bravo, a former Ambassador of Argentina to the Soviet Union and powerful San Juan Province political figure, Bravo served in the Provincial Legislature on his father's Partido Bloquista ticket from 1987 to 1993, and in the Argentine Chamber of Deputies from 1995 to 1999. He returned to the San Juan Legislature, and in 2002, was named Financial Attaché to the Argentine Embassy in Moscow.

Bravo was designated Ambassador to the Russian Federation on September 12, 2006 (a post his father had held during Juan Perón's last presidency, in 1973–74). He served concomitantly as Ambassador to Ukraine from 2007, and from 2008, in Armenia, Kazakhstan, Kyrgyzstan, and Turkmenistan.

He died of cancer on 30 October 2010 at the age of 50; he was survived by his wife, Laura Adámoli, and their four children.

== See also ==
- Embassy of Argentina in Moscow
