= Leopoldo da Gaiche =

Italian Roman Catholic priest (1732–1815)

Blessed Leopoldo da Gaiche O.F.M. Cap.
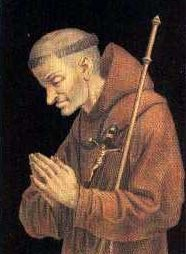

Priest
- Born: 30 October 1732; Gaiche di Piegaro, Perugia, Papal States
- Died: 2 April 1815 (aged 82); Monteluco, Papal States
- Venerated in: Roman Catholic Church
- Beatified: 12 March 1893, Saint Peter's Basilica, Kingdom of Italy by Pope Leo XIII
- Feast: 2 April
- Attributes: Crown of thorns; Franciscan habit; Crucifix
- Patronage: Preachers

Leopoldo da Gaiche (30 October 1732 – 2 April 1815), born Giovanni Croci, was an Italian Roman Catholic priest and a professed member of the Order of Friars Minor who became well known for wearing a crown of thorns. He was a preacher who went from diocese to diocese and served in a position of power in the Franciscan order in the Umbrian region in which he pushed for strong adherence to the Rule of Saint Francis of Assisi. He has been called the "Apostle of Umbria".

His beatification cause started earlier than was the norm due to miracles being done at his tomb and Pope Leo XIII beatified him on 12 March 1893 after the verification of two miracles.

== Life ==
Giovanni Croci was born on 30 October 1732 to poor farmers and he lived a pious life which he picked up from his devout parents; he also worked as a shepherd as a child. From his parish priest he did most of his studies and also learned catechism.

It was a shining moment for Croci's parents when he announced his intention to become a Capuchin friar. He entered a Franciscan convent in his hometown to become a friar in 1752 and assumed the religious name of "Leopoldo da Gaiche" upon admittance, taking the habit for the first time in the convent of Saint Bartholomew in Cibottola. Croci was ordained to the priesthood in 1757 after his novitiate where he was regarded as an excellent student; he received his ordination from the Bishop of Terni Cosimo Pierbenedetto Maculari. He was appointed as an "apostolic missionary" in 1768 and for the duration of a decade travelled across multiple dioceses for the purpose of preaching. As his guide, the friar took the method of Leonard of Port Maurice for his own preaching. He was appointed as a "chief missionary" four years after being named as the "apostolic missionary" in 1772.

Croci kept with him a journal in which it was later learned that he did 330 missions that each lasted an average of two weeks and he also led a total of 40 Lenten retreats. He also restored the devotion of the Via Crucis in many areas where it fell into obscurity or was suppressed.

He was appointed as the Minister Provincial for the Franciscan friars in the Umbrian region in 1781. His tenure was noted for his strong insistence on the careful study and application of the Rule of Saint Francis of Assisi.

In 1788 he chose Monteluco near Spoleto as the site of a monastery, or cloister, he would build, the Monastery of Saint Francis, and he would remain there as part of an ongoing spiritual retreat of strict observance. In 1809 he climbed a mountain in a protest against the invasion of the Italian nation, led by Napoleon Bonaparte, and planted a tree representing justice and liberty, but the invasion forced him to leave the convent, which was subsequently closed down, and abandon his ministry; he was also briefly imprisoned for his refusal in joining the Napoleonic Republic. He began to preach once more following the European Restoration not long after.

He travelled to Rome in 1814 where he met with Pope Pius VII and in the private audience requested that the pope restore the Monteluco convent. Once that was done he returned and spent the remainder of his life there.

During a sermon for Christmas in 1814 he was taken ill and would later die on 2 April 1815 of that illness and was buried in the Church of Saint Francis in Spoleto; his tomb became the site of reported miracles.

== Beatification ==
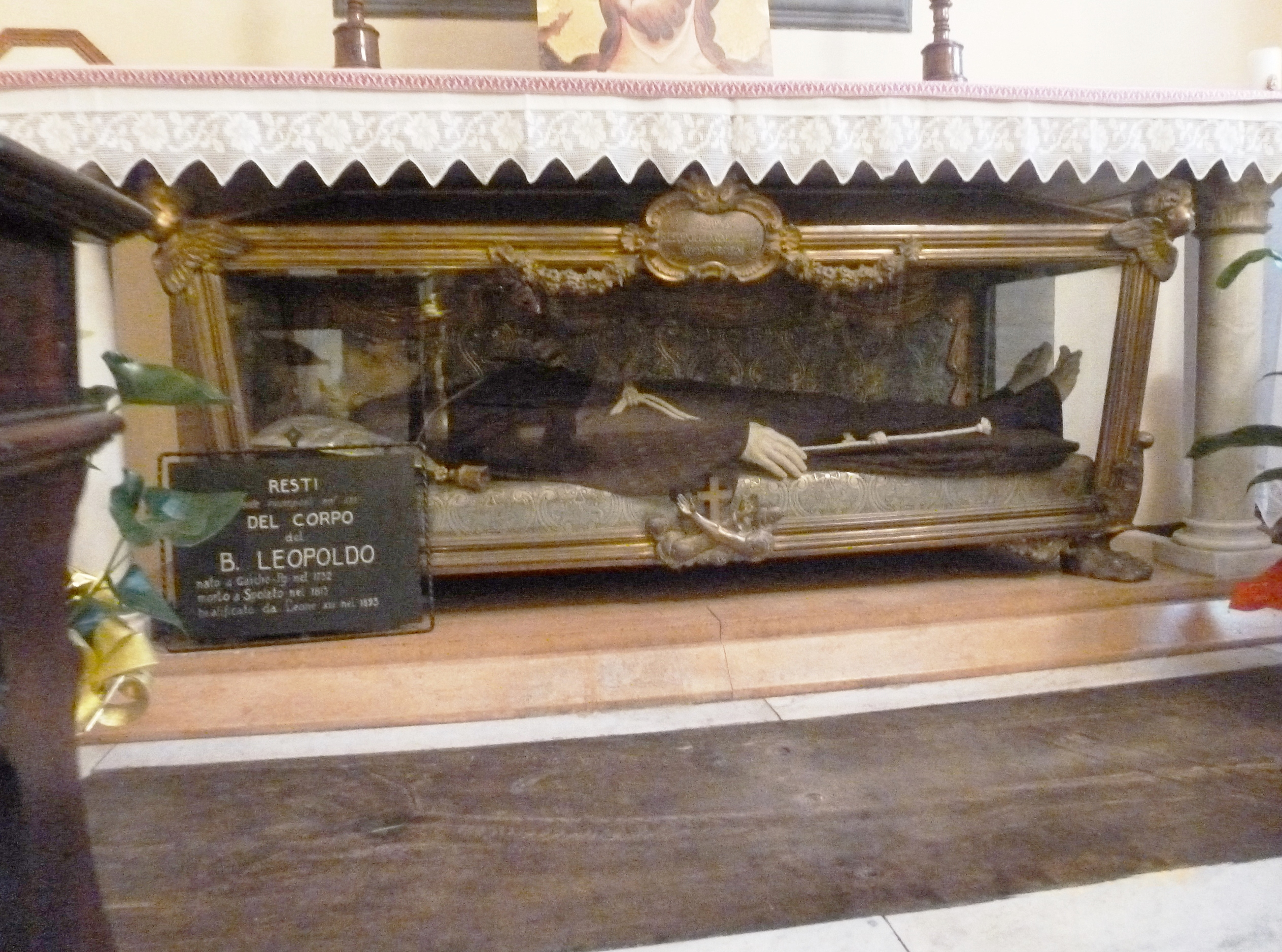
Tomb.

The process of beatification opened in Spoleto in 1844 under Pope Gregory XVI and was the site of two diocesan processes that would collect evidence for the potential sanctification of Leopoldo da Gaiche. Upon the recognition of his model life of heroic virtue he was proclaimed to be Venerable on 13 February 1855 after Pope Pius IX granted his approval to the Congregation of Rites' findings.

The acceptance of two miracles attributed to his intercession allowed for Pope Leo XIII to celebrate his beatification on 12 March 1893.

The current postulator of the cause is Father Giovangiuseppe Califano, O.F.M.
