= Leopoldo Bravo =

Argentine politician and diplomat (1919–2006)

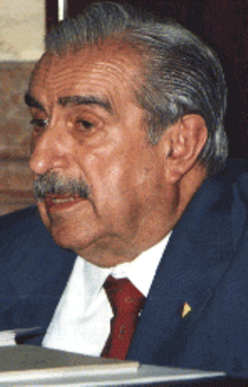

National Senator
- In office December 10, 1989 – December 10, 2001
- Constituency: San Juan
- In office November 28, 1986 – December 10, 1995
- Constituency: San Juan
- In office May 3, 1973 – March 24, 1976
- Constituency: San Juan

Governor of San Juan
- In office December 10, 1983 – November 7, 1985
- Vice Governor: Jorge Ruiz Aguilar
- Preceded by: Eduardo Pósleman
- Succeeded by: Jorge Ruiz Aguilar
- In office January 15, 1982 – December 7, 1982
- Preceded by: Domingo Rodríguez Castro
- Succeeded by: Eduardo Pósleman
- In office October 12, 1963 – June 28, 1966
- Vice Governor: Luis Cattani
- Preceded by: Pedro Avalía
- Succeeded by: Arturo Cordón Aguirre

Personal details
- Born: March 15, 1919 San Juan, Argentina
- Died: August 4, 2006 (aged 87)
- Party: Justicialist Party
- Spouse: Ivelise Falcioni de Bravo
- Profession: Lawyer

Leopoldo Bravo (March 15, 1919 – August 4, 2006) was an Argentine politician and diplomat. A Senator and Ambassador to the Soviet Union, he was a three-time governor of San Juan Province, where he came to be regarded as a caudillo (kingmaker).

== Career ==
Bravo was born in San Juan, the illegitimate son of Governor Federico Cantoni, and Enoe Bravo. In an era in which men of higher social status could often opt not to do so, Cantoni acknowledged the child as his own, though young Leopoldo opted to keep his mother's last name when he came of age. Bravo graduated from the University of La Plata with a law degree in 1942. At a young age Bravo joined the leadership of the Partido Bloquista, a provincial party which split from the ruling Radical Civic Union during the 1916-22 tenure of President Hipólito Yrigoyen.

He was appointed chargé d'affaires at the Argentine Embassy in Moscow, in 1946, and in 1953 he was appointed as Ambassador to the Soviet Union by President Juan Perón, succeeding Cantoni, his father. He was one of the few ambassadors to have had an interview with Joseph Stalin, as well as the last.

He was elected Governor of San Juan with Peronist support in 1962, but President Arturo Frondizi was forced to annul the elections due to military and conservative objections to Peronism; he ran again in 1963, and took office, serving until 1966. A pragmatic and experienced politician, Bravo advised civilian and military governments, and he maintained ties with the exiled Perón, though was opposed to most of the CGT labor union and Peronist movement leadership. Bravo was a vice-presidential candidate on the ticket led by Brig. Gen. Ezequiel Martínez, backed by then-President Alejandro Lanusse, in the March 1973 elections. Although they lost that election, Bravo was elected to the Senate for the first time that year. The Senate was dissolved in 1976 by a military coup.

During the military government following the 1976 coup, Bravo was reappointed Ambassador to the Soviet Union and Mongolia, serving until 1981, and, briefly, Ambassador to Italy. He was appointed governor of San Juan in 1982. In 1983 his brother, Federico Bravo, succeeded him as ambassador in Moscow. When democracy returned in 1983, Leopoldo was again elected governor; but a poor showing in the 1985 legislative elections led him to resign halfway through the term.

Bravo was elected senator for his province in 1989. He allied himself with President Carlos Menem, and his vote was decisive in the Senate approval of the 1993 Olivos Pact that allowed the President to stand for a second term. After his retirement as leader, Bravo became honorary president of the Partido Bloquista, which went on to participate in the ruling Alliance of Fernando de la Rúa and take over the government of San Juan once again after the impeachment of the incumbent.

Bravo stepped down from the Senate in 2001. In his final years, he suffered from Alzheimer's, and had withdrawn from public life. He died of an intestinal haemorrhage and cardiac arrest. Five hundred people attended his funeral, although his wife could not be present. He and his wife Ivelise Falcioni had six children. One of Bravo's sons, Leopoldo Alfredo Bravo, a former deputy, was appointed Ambassador to Russia a week before his father's death, following in the footsteps of his father, uncle and grandfather.
