= Leopoldo Baracco =

Italian politician

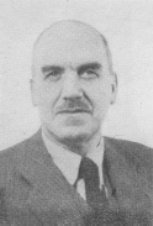
Leopoldo Baracco

Leopoldo Baracco (9 October 1886 - 13 January 1966) was an Italian politician.

Baracco was born in Asti, and represented the Christian Democracy party in the Constituent Assembly of Italy from 1946 to 1948 and in the Senate of the Republic from 1948 to 1968.
