= Leopoldo Toniolo =

Italian painter (1833–1908)

Leopoldo Toniolo (1833–1908) was an Italian painter, mainly of genre themes.

Toniolo was born in Schio, Province of Vicenza, but had moved to Padua by 1861. El me ama, was exhibited in 1880 in Turin, along with a canvas depicting: An Antiquarian. In Milan in 1881, he exhibited: Repose of the Odalisque, In 1887 in Venice, he exhibited In aspettazione della solita partita. He also painted portraits both contemporary, such as a young Malmignati Leoni, and historical, such as Portrait of Petrarch.
