= That Thing You Do! =

1996 film by Tom Hanks

- Theatrical release poster
- Directed by: Tom Hanks
- Written by: Tom Hanks
- Produced by: Gary Goetzman; Jonathan Demme; Edward Saxon
- Starring: Tom Everett Scott; Liv Tyler; Johnathon Schaech; Steve Zahn; Ethan Embry; Tom Hanks
- Cinematography: Tak Fujimoto
- Edited by: Richard Chew
- Music by: Howard Shore
- Production companies: Clinica Estetico; Clavius Base
- Distributed by: 20th Century Fox
- Release date: October 4, 1996
- Running time: 108 minutes (theatrical cut); 148 minutes (extended cut)
- Country: United States
- Language: English
- Budget: $26 million
- Box office: $34.6 million

That Thing You Do! is a 1996 American comedy-drama film written and directed by Tom Hanks, in his feature writing and directorial debut. Set in the 1960s, the film chronicles the rise and fall of a fictional one-hit wonder rock and roll band, "The Wonders", portrayed by Tom Everett Scott, Johnathon Schaech, Steve Zahn, and Ethan Embry. Liv Tyler and Hanks appear in supporting roles. The film's original score features a collaboration of artists including Hanks, Adam Schlesinger, and Howard Shore. The soundtrack peaked at #21 on the Billboard 200 albums chart, featuring a mix of diegetic and non-diegetic tracks.

The film was a financial disappointment, grossing $34.6 million against a $26 million budget. However, That Thing You Do earned warm critical reviews, was nominated for several industry awards, and produced a musical hit with the title song, which was nominated for an Academy Award and a Golden Globe Award for Best Original Song. It has since garnered a cult following.

== Plot ==
In 1964, aspiring jazz drummer Guy Patterson is working in his family's appliance store in Erie, Pennsylvania. Local musicians Jimmy Mattingly II and Lenny Haise ask him to perform in their band at the local talent show, because their regular drummer broke his arm. They rehearse a song in Jimmy's garage, a slow-tempo ballad he wrote titled "That Thing You Do!". Jimmy's girlfriend Faye Dolan, inspired by the Beatles and the band's one song, suggests the band should be named "The Oneders" (pronounced "wonders", but often mispronounced by others as "Oh-Needers"). At the talent show, Guy propels the song into a faster tempo, which wins the band the competition and earns them a paying gig at a local pizza parlor. After the Oneders decide to record the song and sell 45's of it, local talent promoter Phil Horace notices the band, promising them radio airplay within 10 days. Lenny convinces the band to sign with Phil.

Phil keeps his promise and the song gets regular play on Pennsylvania radio, becoming an instant local hit. He eventually books the Oneders for a showcase concert in Pittsburgh, but technical difficulties and the band's lack of stagecraft result in a disastrous performance. Afterward, Phil introduces a dispirited Guy to Mr. White, an A&R representative for Play-Tone Records, who offers the band a contract and becomes their manager. White renames the band "The Wonders" and unifies their style and presentation. He places them on the Play-Tone tour of Midwestern state fairs, with Faye handling their wardrobes so she can stay on the tour with Jimmy.

During the tour, the Wonders meet other acts, learn about the business, and improve their performing skills. "That Thing You Do!" garners national radio airplay, raising the band's popularity and eventually reaching number 7 on the Billboard Hot 100. Mr. White then sends them to Los Angeles for publicity, including radio and film appearances. While the rest of the band revels in their newfound fame and success, Jimmy is fixated on recording a new single, becoming increasingly irritable.

On the day of their appearance on The Hollywood Television Showcase, a nationally televised live variety show, the band is in disarray. Guy is hungover after meeting his idol, jazz pianist Del Paxton, at a club the previous night; Jimmy is nervous and overcome with nausea; Lenny is preoccupied with his new girlfriend; and the band's bass guitarist has absconded to Disneyland with members of the Marine Corps, necessitating Mr. White to procure a replacement. The Wonders successfully perform "That Thing You Do!" on the show, but when television captions introduce the individual members, Jimmy is visibly angered by an additional caption announcing his apparent engagement. In the dressing room after the performance, Jimmy furiously accuses Faye of orchestrating the engagement announcement. Faye, already disillusioned with Jimmy's behavior, breaks up with him. Lenny, meanwhile, elopes to Las Vegas with his girlfriend.

The next day, at a scheduled Play-Tone recording session, Mr. White has brought new material approved by Play-Tone for Jimmy and Guy to record, as dictated by the band's contract. Jimmy, insistent on recording his own songs, immediately quits and leaves. Guy is downcast, but Mr. White reassures him that short-lived one-hit wonders are common in the music industry. Now left alone in the studio, Guy improvises on his drumkit, attracting the attention of Del Paxton who is there for his own recording session. Impressed by Guy's drumming, Del joins Guy and they record an improvised jazz duet. Returning to the hotel to check out, Guy tells a dejected Faye that he plans to stay in Los Angeles, while she says she will return to Erie. He pursues her and they share a kiss.

A picture-and-text epilogue reveals the fates of the band members. Jimmy returned to Play-Tone, formed a successful new band named the Heardsmen, and became a record producer in Los Angeles. Lenny broke up with his new girlfriend, and manages a casino in Laughlin, Nevada. The bass guitarist, T.B. Player, served two tours of duty in Vietnam with the Marines, earning a Purple Heart, and works in construction in Orlando, Florida. Finally, Guy and Faye married and raised four children in Venice, California, before moving to Bainbridge Island, Washington and founding the Puget Sound Conservatory of Music, where Guy teaches jazz composition.

== Cast ==
- Tom Everett Scott as Guy "Skitch" (later "Shades") Patterson, the Wonders' drummer
- Liv Tyler as Faye Dolan, Jimmy's girlfriend (later Guy's) and the band's costume mistress
- Johnathon Schaech as James "Jimmy" Mattingly II, the Wonders' lead singer and rhythm guitarist
- Steve Zahn as Leonard "Lenny" Haise, the Wonders' lead guitarist
- Ethan Embry as T.B. Player, the Wonders' bass guitarist
- Tom Hanks as Mr. Amos White, a Play-Tone employee who becomes the Wonders' manager
- Charlize Theron as Tina Powers, Guy's former girlfriend who later ends up with her dentist
- Keith Neubert as Tina's dentist
- Obba Babatundé as Lamarr, concierge of the Ambassador Hotel who befriends the Wonders
- Giovanni Ribisi as Chad, the band's original drummer who injured his arm and takes over Guy's position in Patterson's Appliance store
- Chris Ellis as Phil Horace, the band's first manager
- Alex Rocco as Sol Siler, founder of Play-Tone Records
- Bill Cobbs as Del Paxton, a jazz pianist and Guy's favorite musician
- Peter Scolari as Troy Chesterfield, film actor and host of The Hollywood Television Showcase
- Rita Wilson as Marguerite, the waitress at The Blue Spot jazz club
- Chris Isaak as Guy's Uncle Bob, a church minister who records the Wonders' songs "That Thing You Do!" and "All My Only Dreams" for release on 45s
- Kevin Pollak as Victor "Boss Vic Koss" Kosslovich, Pittsburgh concert promoter
- Robert Torti as Freddy Fredrickson, a Play-Tone singer
- Chaille Percival as Diane Dane, a Play-Tone singer
- Holmes Osborne as Mr. Patterson, Guy's father and owner of Patterson's Appliance store
- Sean Whalen as a heckler at the talent show, later the first "fan" of The Oneders
- Clint Howard as a KJZZ disc jockey
- Kathleen Kinmont as Koss' secretary
- Jonathan Demme as the director of Weekend at Party Pier
- Tracy Reiner as Anita, the co-star of Weekend at Party Pier
- Barry Sobel as "Goofball" in Weekend at Party Pier
- Paul Feig as a KMPC disc jockey
- Gedde Watanabe as a Play-Tone photographer
- Robert Ridgely as the Hollywood Showcase announcer
- Marc McClure as the Hollywood Showcase director
- Bryan Cranston as Virgil "Gus" Grissom, an astronaut who appears as a guest on The Hollywood Television Showcase
- Colin Hanks as a page at the City of Broadcasting
- Larry Antonino as Scott "Wolfman" Pell, a Play-Tone session musician who becomes the Wonders' bass guitarist after T.B. Player leaves for the Marines
- Kennya J. Ramsey, Julie L. Harkness, and Darlene Dillinger as the Chantrellines, a Play-Tone girl group
- Howie Long as Mr. White's driver/partner Lloyd in the extended cut; his part was entirely cut from the theatrical release.

== Production and music ==
The film features original music by Tom Hanks, Adam Schlesinger, Rick Elias, Scott Rogness, Mike Piccirillo, Gary Goetzman and Howard Shore. In the film, the Wonders rise to brief stardom on the strength of "That Thing You Do", a song written as a wistful ballad but which becomes an uptempo rocker during the band's first performance at a talent show. Written and composed for the film by Adam Schlesinger, bassist for Fountains of Wayne and Ivy and released on the film's soundtrack, the song became a genuine hit for the Wonders in 1996 (the song peaked at number 41 on the Billboard Hot 100, number 22 on the Adult Contemporary charts, number 18 on the Adult Top 40, and number 24 on the Top 40 Mainstream charts). The track was nominated for a 1996 Golden Globe Award as well as a 1996 Academy Award for Best Original Song. Mike Viola of the Candy Butchers provided the lead vocals for the Wonders.

In the film, the title song is referenced with "All My Only Dreams" as the B-side. The actual 45 rpm single, released to record stores in North America, features "Dance with Me Tonight" as its B-side. The song has since been recorded by the Knack, Billie Joe Armstrong, and Bubblegum Lemonade. The Wonders are also seen playing the song "Little Wild One". This was written by the band Gigolo Aunts as a "faux-Beatles"-style tune at the request of their record label to be submitted for consideration for inclusion in the film.

To perform the Wonders' songs convincingly on-camera, Scott, Schaech, Zahn and Embry took several weeks of individual lessons, followed by daily practice as a group. Of the four, only Zahn and Embry had any prior experience of playing their assigned instruments. They eventually honed their performance to the point where extras on the set thought they were actually playing the songs, when in reality they were miming along to recordings by professional musicians.

The song that plays during the film's opening credits, "Lovin' You Lots and Lots", is credited to the fictitious Norm Wooster Singers and was actually written by Hanks. This song is a send-up of Ray Conniff, Mitch Miller, and other practitioners of the "beautiful music" or proto-Muzak formats that were a staple of adult radio during the early 1960s such as on KPOL (AM) 1540 in Los Angeles. Hanks also composed Guy's jazzy signature drum solo, "I Am Spartacus".

The Wonders' bass guitarist (played by Ethan Embry) is unnamed in the film; in the end credits, he is credited as "T.B. Player". This is short for "The Bass Player", a joke based on the perception that bass players are often unknown and unappreciated. Embry later provided his own take on the character's real name: "I just said my name was Tobias, because he's such a Tobias. You just take the vowels out [and it's T.B.]. His nickname was Toby, but his mom calls him Tobias. And his last name actually was Player, because he was a player, dude! That carousel ride with the Chantrellines? Total player."

The band at the Blue Spot were portrayed by jazz musicians Alphonse Mouzon, James Leary and Barth Beasley.

=== The real Wonders ===
There were at least two real groups named the Wonders who made the record charts at various radio stations in the early 1960s. One was a soul group who had a record called "Please Don't Cry" (b/w "With These Hands"; Bamboo 523) that was cited in the September 1, 1962, issue of Billboard as having "moderate sales potential", but it was not successful. (The flip, however, was played by KCRG in Cedar Rapids, Iowa, in the fall of 1962.)

The other Wonders had a regional hit record called "Say There" (b/w "Marilyn"; Colpix 699), released in August 1963. A mixed race doo wop group from New York City, they also recorded as the Satans Four [sic]. "Say There" hit the Top 20 at WCOL in Columbus, Ohio, and made the top 30 at KQV in Pittsburgh. In addition, the tune made the radio publication The Gavin Report as a regional hit in their August 16, 1963, issue.

== Soundtrack ==
The soundtrack album (released under the Playtone name in conjunction with Epic Records) was also a hit, peaking at #21 on the Billboard 200 albums chart. The CD artwork is a replica of the fictional Playtone label used in the movie, and the liner notes are done in a mockumentary style, as if the Wonders had been a real group and the events of the film had actually happened. Hanks later used the success of That Thing You Do! as a springboard to launch the actual Playtone Records label, through which the soundtracks of all his subsequent films, as well as other films such as Bring It On and television programs such as The Sopranos, were released as albums.

== Release ==
=== Box office ===
The film grossed $25.9 million domestically and $8.7 million internationally for a total worldwide gross of $34.6 million. The film debuted at No. 3.

=== Home media ===
That Thing You Do! was first released on February 13, 1997, and March 4, 1997, on VHS by 20th Century Fox Home Entertainment. The film was released on Laserdisc on April 2, 1997. In 1998, That Thing You Do! became available in the DIVX format (as with all 20th Century Fox films), rather than DVD. After DIVX failed, the film was released on DVD on June 5, 2001. It included the featurette "The Making of That Thing You Do!", and two music videos.

On May 8, 2007, a 2-disc Tom Hanks' Extended Edition was released, containing 39 minutes of deleted scenes, and new bonus content. This was followed by a Blu-ray release on April 2, 2013.

Despite its title, the "extended" cut was actually an assembly cut, which was a first rough edit of the footage. Tom Hanks did not participate in its promotion and the disc contained no new footage of him.

==== Deleted scenes ====
Many of the restored scenes are devoted to character development. A tastefully steamy look at Guy's "make-out" session with Tina at his apartment is included. The extended version also goes more in-depth with Guy's developing relationship with Faye (via mild flirting) and his deteriorating relationship with Tina, as well as Tina's budding relationship with her dentist, Dr. Collins. It also suggests that the character portrayed by Tom Hanks (Mr. White) is not only gay but in a relationship with a man played by former NFL defensive lineman Howie Long.

More camera time is also devoted to the tryst between the bass player and one of the singers of the Chantrellines. In the theatrical cut, this romance was depicted mainly as an unrequited crush on the part of the bass player; in the extended cut it is clearly shown that his efforts were successful.

At the end of the Extended Edition, rather than becoming a studio drummer on the recommendation of Del Paxton, Guy becomes a disc jockey for the jazz station KJZZ and records a documentary series of interviews with legendary jazz musicians.

== Reception ==
=== Critical response ===
On Rotten Tomatoes, the film has an approval rating of 94% based on reviews from 62 critics, with an average rating of 7.30/10. The site's consensus reads, "A light, sweet, and thoroughly entertaining debut for director Tom Hanks, That Thing You Do! makes up in charm what it lacks in complexity". On Metacritic, the film has a score of 71 out of 100 based on reviews from 22 critics, indicating "generally favorable reviews".

Emanuel Levy of Variety called it "A top-notch production, exuberant period music and Hanks the actor in an important role cunningly disguised a rather slight and inconsequential narrative." Roger Ebert of the Chicago Sun-Times gave it 3 out of 4 and wrote: "The movie may be inconsequential, but in some ways that's a strength. Without hauling in a lot of deep meanings, it remembers with great warmth a time and a place." On At the Movies, Ebert's colleague Gene Siskel praised Tom Everett Scott's debut performance and agreed with Ebert's assessment of the film as lacking a strong message, calling it "an absolutely likeable movie—breezy, sweet, funny, and of no great importance." He gave it a "marginal thumbs up."

=== Accolades ===
Award	Category	Nominee(s)	Result
20/20 Awards	Best Song	"That Thing You Do!"; Music and Lyrics by Adam Schlesinger	Nominated
Academy Awards	Best Original Song	"That Thing You Do!"; Music and Lyrics by Adam Schlesinger	Nominated
American Comedy Awards	Funniest Supporting Actor in a Motion Picture	Tom Hanks	Nominated
Artios Awards	Best Casting for Feature Film – Comedy	John Lyons	Won
California on Location Awards	Production Company of the Year – Features		Won
Chicago Film Critics Association Awards	Best Original Score	Howard Shore	Nominated
Florida Film Critics Circle Awards	Best Song	"That Thing You Do!"; Music and Lyrics by Adam Schlesinger	Won
Golden Globe Awards	Best Original Song	"That Thing You Do!"; Music and Lyrics by Adam Schlesinger	Nominated
Online Film & Television Association Awards	Best Original Song	"That Thing You Do!"; Music and Lyrics by Adam Schlesinger	Nominated
Satellite Awards	Best Original Song	"That Thing You Do!"; Music and Lyrics by Adam Schlesinger	Nominated
Young Artist Awards	Best Family Feature – Musical or Comedy		Nominated

== Reunion ==
The Erie SeaWolves hosted Wonders Night on September 4, 2021, at UPMC Park. Cast members Johnathon Schaech, Tom Everett Scott, and Steve Zahn traveled to Erie for the occasion and participated in a panel discussion, autograph session, and elements of the ballgame presentation. Cast member Ethan Embry joined the panel discussion virtually. As a result of funds collected from VIP experiences as well as memorabilia and jersey auctions, the 25th anniversary event raised $25,500 for Notice Ability, a nonprofit organization dedicated to helping students with dyslexia. Additional donations were made to Notice Ability, bringing the total sum raised to nearly a quarter of a million dollars. Wonders Night also earned the SeaWolves Promotion of the Year recognition by Ballpark Digest.

== See also ==
- Playtone
