= Leopoldo Bertrand =

Spanish engineer and politician (born 1943)

Member of the Congress of Deputies
- In office 2004–2008
- Constituency: Asturias

Personal details
- Born: 1943 (age 82–83) Gijón, Spain
- Party: People's Party
- Spouse: María Antonia del Río
- Children: 4
- Education: Naval Military Academy
- Profession: Military engineer

Leopoldo Bertrand (born 1943) is a Spanish military engineer and politician. He served at the Parliament for the People's Party representing Asturias between 2004 and 2008.

== Early life and education ==
Bertrand was born in Gijón in 1943. His mother was Concepción de la Riera who died at the age of 99 in May 2019. He has three siblings.

Bertrand graduated from the Colegio de la Inmaculada in his hometown in 1962. He attended the Naval Military Academy in Marín, Pontevedra and graduated as a second lieutenant.

== Career ==
Bertrand worked in the shipyards of the Marítima del Musel company before he attended the Naval Military Academy. Following his graduation from the academy he worked in the Spanish Navy based in Gijón. He retired from the Navy and worked at the Maritime Safety and Rescue Society in Madrid.

Bertrand became the councilor of the Gijón City Council and then was elected as a deputy for the People's Party in 2004. While he was serving at the Parliament he was appointed dean of the Official College of Naval and Oceanic Engineersin 2007 which he held for eight years. Then he served as a board member of the college.

== Personal life ==
Bertrand is married to María Antonia del Río and has four children.
