= Leopoldo Borda Roldan =

Colombian diplomat

Leopoldo Borda Roldán
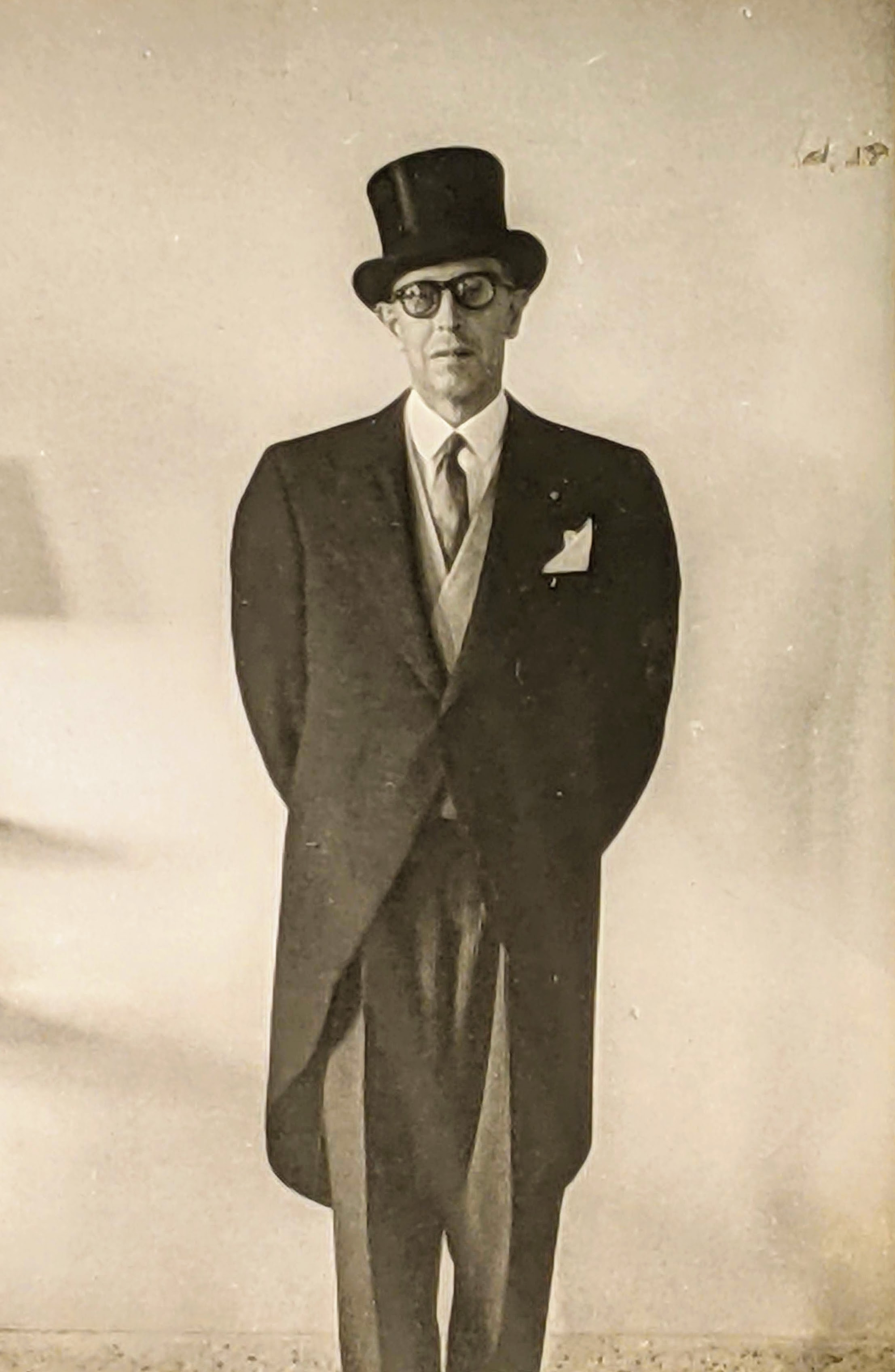
- Dressed for unknown diplomatic event

1st Colombia Ambassador to India
- In office 7 July 1959 – 1961
- President: Alberto Lleras Camargo
- Preceded by: Office created
- Succeeded by: Miguel López Pumarejo

Colombia Ambassador to Bolivia
- In office 6 December 1957 – 20 May 1959
- President: Gabriel París Gordillo
- Preceded by: Rodolfo García y García
- Succeeded by: Miguel Antonio Santamaría Dávila

Personal details
- Born: 9 August 1898 Bogota, Colombia
- Died: 1 January 1977 (aged 78) Bogota Colombia
- Spouse: Suzanne Weiprecht Berthelot
- Children: Helena, Daniel, Jacqueline, Miguel Leopoldo
- Profession: Engineer and Career Diplomat

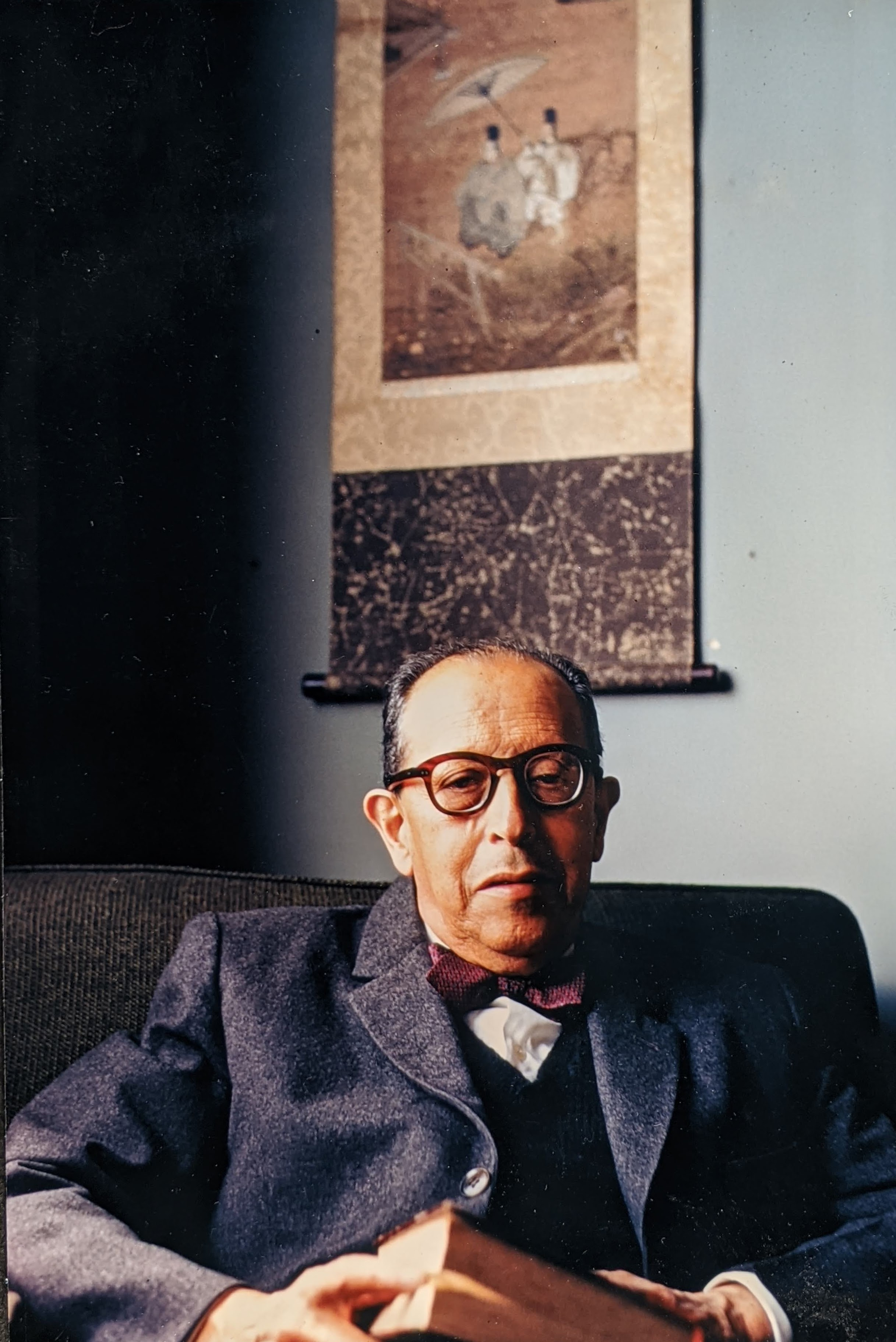
Leopoldo In his Bogotá apartment. On the wall is a Japanese hanging scroll (kakemono) he acquired while in Japan as the Chargé d'Affaires for the Colombian missions.

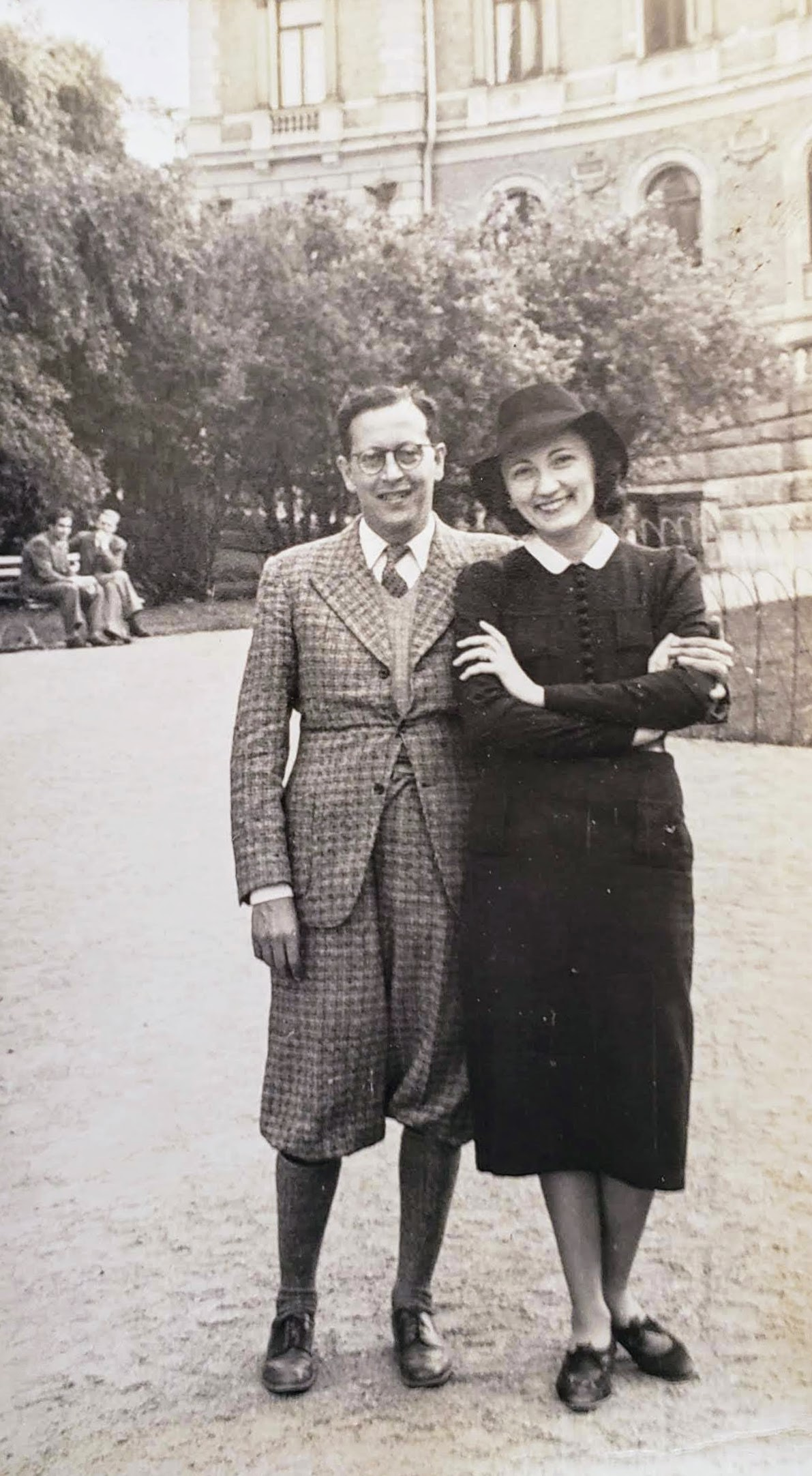
Leopoldo and Suzanne (Susie) met in Paris when he was 21 years of age while working with the Colombian Legation. They married in 1930 and had four children.

Leopoldo Borda Roldán (1898–1977) was a Colombian engineer and career diplomat who served as the 1st Ambassador of Colombia to India. Prior to this inaugural post, he also served as Ambassador of Colombia to Bolivia and held other administrative posts in the foreign service including serving as the 7th Consul General of Colombia in Paris, and served as Chargé d'Affaires for the Colombian missions in Japan, Sweden, and Norway.

== Ambassadorship in Bolivia ==
Borda was named Ambassador of Colombia to Bolivia on 14 September 1957, replacing the exiting Ambassador Rodolfo García y García. He arrived in La Paz later that same year on 26 November taking official charge of the Embassy, and presented his letters of credence to President Hernán Siles Zuazo at the Palacio Quemado.

== Ambassadorship in India ==
In pursuit of grounding the recent established diplomatic relations between Colombia and India on 19 January 1959, President Alberto Lleras Camargo, by means of Decree 1446 of 1959 on 20 May 1959, pronounced the establishment of a diplomatic mission in India at the Embassy level and named Borda as the 1st Ambassador of Colombia to India. Borda arrived in New Delhi on 22 June of the same year; on 27 June he met with Prime Minister Jawaharlal Nehru in an official ceremony, and the next month on 7 July Borda presented his letter of credence to President Rajendra Prasad at the Rashtrapati Bhavan.

== Curriculum Vitae (CV) ==
(from his personal files)

Name: Leopoldo Borda Roldan

Born: Bogota, Colombia; August 9, 1898

Married: Suzanne C. Weiprecht, born in Paris, France

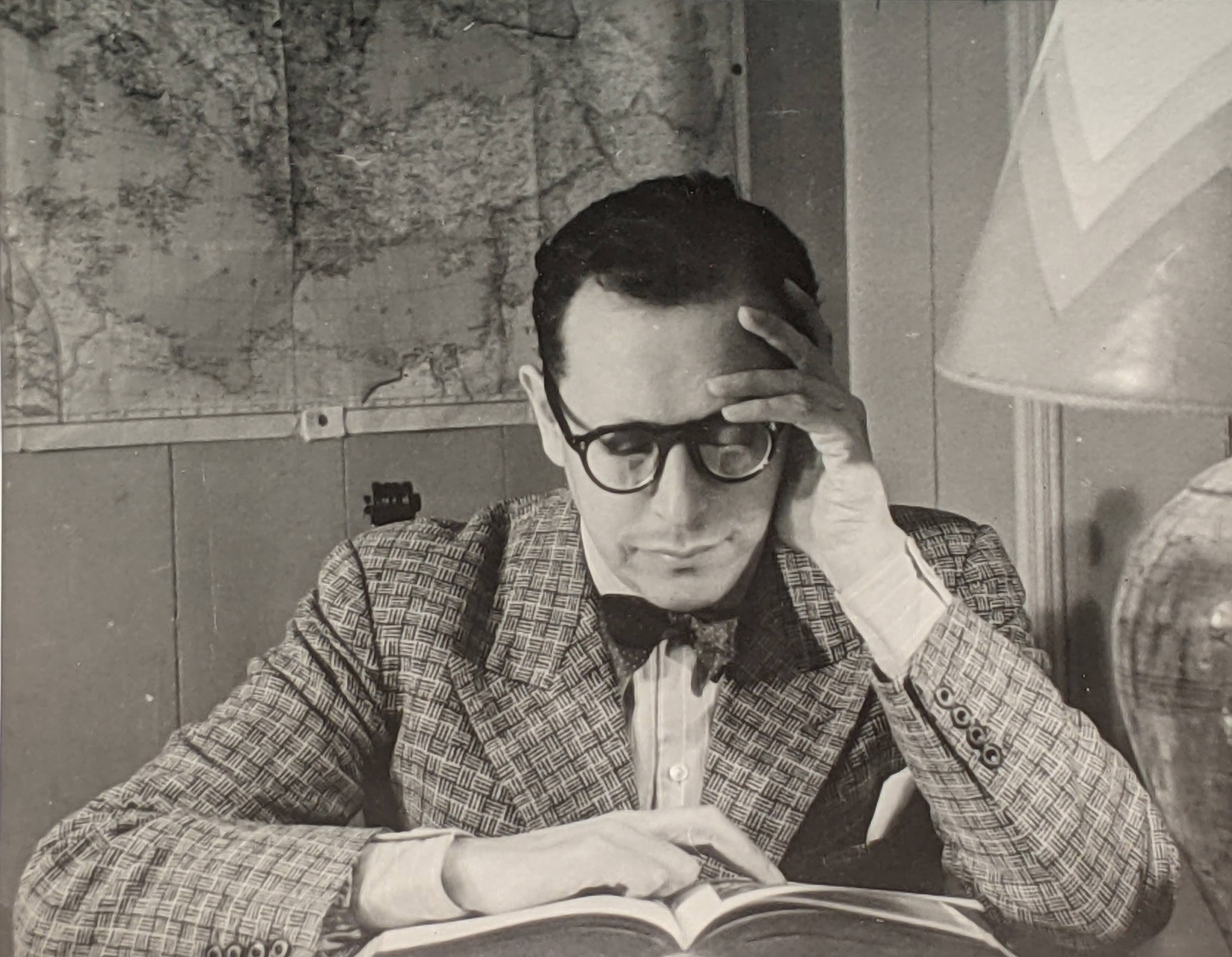
Leopoldo reading in his library in Bogotá in the 1960s

Education: B.A. from the College of San Bartolome, Bogota, Colombia. November 22, 1914.

Studies:

- Engineering at the National University of Colombia. 1915–1919.
- Studied general culture in France, Denmark, Japan, and Sweden.
- Received an honorary degree from the Colombian Academy of Educational Sciences, November 24, 1933.

Languages:

- Speaks and writes fluently: Spanish, French, English, and speaks and reads: Italian, Norwegian, Danish, Swedish, and Japanese.
- Advanced studies in Chinese, including character writing and literature.

Decorations:

- Officer of the French Legion of Honor.
- The Order of Merit of Ecuador.
- The Order of the Polar Star of Sweden.
- Senior Officer of the Order of Vasa of Sweden.

== Assignments ==
- Surveyor of the Tolima Railroad in Colombia, December through April 1917.
- Assistant City Engineer in Bogotá, May through July 1917.
- Trainee at the Office of Information and Commercial Propaganda of the Colombian Government in Paris, 1919.
- Honorary Secretary of the same office from December 1919 to February 1923.
- Official Secretary of the same office, and also temporary director, March 1923 to June 1929.
- Editor of the magazine "Colombia," published by the Colombian Government in Paris, 1920 to 1929.
- Director of Public Education of the Ministry of Education for the state of Cundinamarca, 1930 to 1933
- First Secretary of the Colombian Legation in Quito, Ecuador, from 1933 to 1937. During this period, he was Charge d'Affaire for six months.
- Charge d'Affaire in the Colombian Legation to Japan, from 1937 to 1939.
- Consul General from Colombia in Yokohama, from 1937 to 1939.
- Charge d'Affaire in the Colombian Legation to Sweden and Norway, from 1939 to 1945.
- Colombian Delegate to the League of Nations in Geneva; Charge d'Affaire in the Colombian Legation to Switzerland, from May to August 1940.
- Charge d'Affaire in the Colombian Embassy in France, from 1946.
- Consul General in Paris, from 1946
- Refused appointment as Chargé d'Affaire in Moscow 1945, and was transferred from the Diplomatic Service.
- Director of Immigration and Naturalization for Colombia 1946–1947.
- Resumed Diplomatic Service as Minister Counselor of the Colombian Embassy in France 1947–1949.
- Secretary General of the Colombian Delegation to the General Assembly of the United Nations 1948.
- Chargé d'Affaire in the Colombian Embassy in Panama 1949–1952.
- Minister Counselor to the Colombian Embassy in Panama 1952–1955.
- Minister Counselor to the Colombian Embassy in Japan 1955–present

== Special Assignments ==
- President of the Colombian Delegation to the World Educational Congress in Tokyo – 1937
- President of the Colombian Delegation to the Linguistic Conference in Sweden – 1939
- President of the Colombian Delegation to the International Congress of Labor in Paris – 1945
- Chief of the Colombian Delegation to the 12th Universal Postal Congress in Paris – 1947
- Delegate from Colombia to the Third Extraordinary Conference of UNESCO in Paris – 1948
- Delegate from the City of Bogota, Colombia to the Congress of World Capitals in Paris – 1948
- Minister Counselor of a special mission to El Salvador for the presidential inauguration – 1950
- Commercial Mission to Japan – 1955
