= Leopoldo Bersani =

Italian-born painter and sculptor who settled in Uruguay (1848–1903)

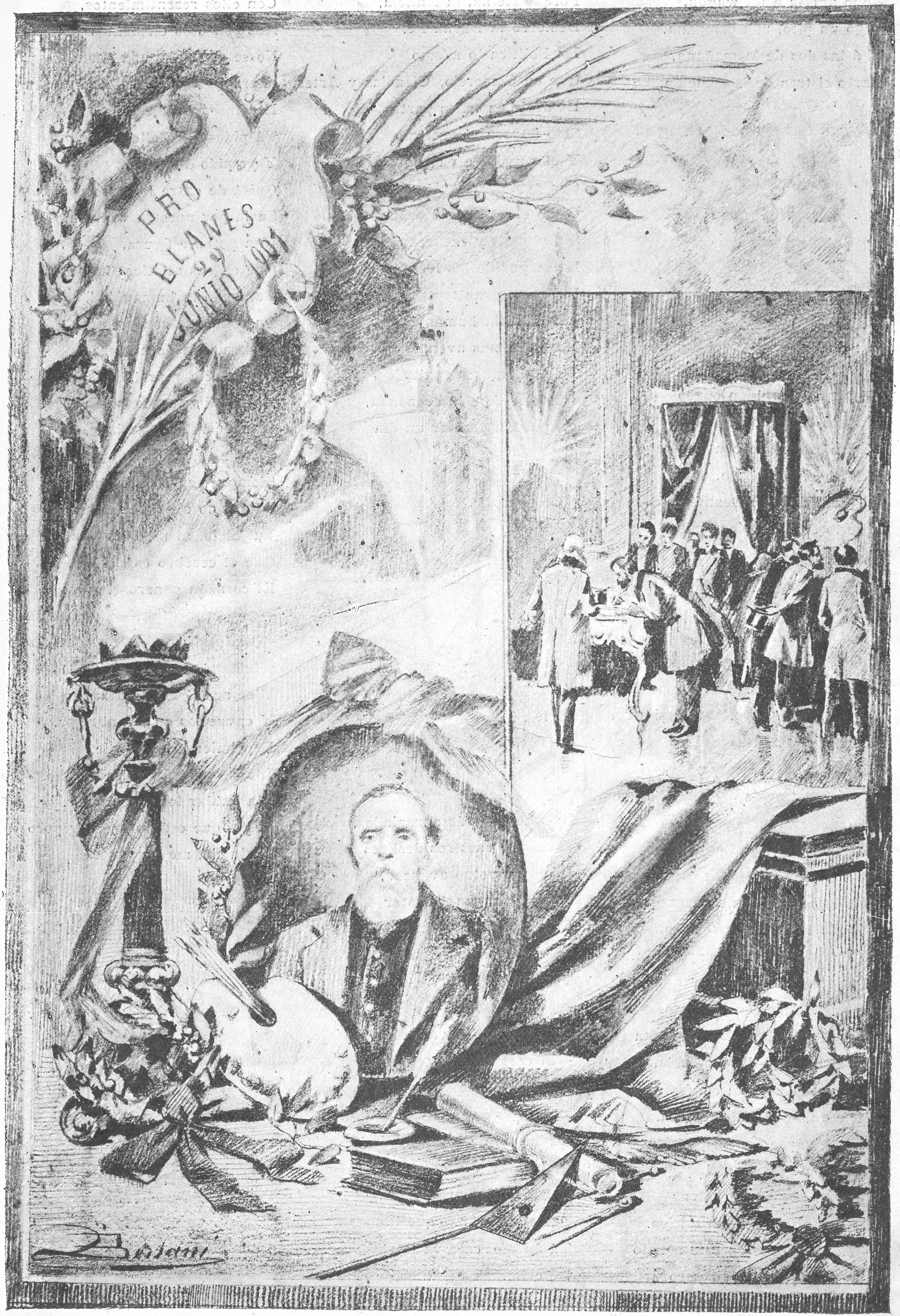
Allegory in memory of Juan Manuel Blanes (1901) by Bersani.

Leopoldo Bersani (Bologna, 6 April 1848 - Montevideo, 1903) was an Italian painter and sculptor who moved to Uruguay as a young adult.

== Bibliography ==
He studied literature, painting, and design in Bologna. In 1866, he joined the Cacciatore Volante forces of Giuseppe Garibaldi, fighting in the Tyrol against the Austrians.

By the next year he had relocated to Montevideo. There he became known as painter and teacher. He was known for his portraits.
