= Leopoldo Burlando =

Italian painter (1841–1915)

Leopoldo Burlando (1841–1915) was an Italian painter, mainly painting cityscapes and vedute.

He was born in Milan, then in the Austrian Empire. He also trained in Milan at the Brera Academy under professor Luigi Bisi. He is known for painting vedute of Venice and Milan, and also interior perspectives of buildings such as the Certosa of Pavia and the Cathedral of Milan. He painted in oil and watercolor. Burlando was named honorary associate of the Brera Academy. He was also teacher of industrial design at the male orphanage in Milan.
