= The Truth About Charlie =

- Theatrical release poster
- Directed by: Jonathan Demme
- Screenplay by: Jonathan Demme; Steve Schmidt; Peter Joshua; Jessica Bendinger
- Based on: Charade by Peter Stone
- Produced by: Jonathan Demme; Peter Saraf; Edward Saxon; Ilona Herzberg; Neda Armian; Mishka Cheyko
- Starring: Mark Wahlberg; Thandiwe Newton; Tim Robbins; Joong-Hoon Park; Ted Levine; Lisa Gay Hamilton
- Cinematography: Tak Fujimoto
- Edited by: Carol Littleton
- Music by: Rachel Portman; Deva Anderson
- Production companies: Mediastrem Film; Clinica Estetico Productions
- Distributed by: Universal Pictures
- Release date: 25 October 2002
- Running time: 104 minutes
- Countries: United States; France
- Languages: English; French
- Budget: $60 million
- Box office: $7.1 million

The Truth About Charlie is a 2002 mystery film directed, produced, and co-written by Jonathan Demme. A remake of Charade (1963), it stars Mark Wahlberg and Thandiwe Newton in the roles played by Cary Grant and Audrey Hepburn in Charade. The film is also an homage to François Truffaut's Shoot the Piano Player (1960) complete with the French singer Charles Aznavour, making two appearances singing his song "Quand tu m'aimes" (first in French, later in English).

The Truth About Charlie closely mirrors the plotline of Charade. The story is once again set in Paris and features several famous French actors. Director Agnès Varda makes a cameo appearance. Actress/chanteuse Anna Karina sings a Serge Gainsbourg song in one scene. Peter Stone, screenwriter of Charade, receives a story credit as Peter Joshua, one of the aliases Grant's character uses in the first film. The name of Wahlberg's character in the remake is Joshua Peters.

== Plot ==
British newlywed Regina Lambert lives in Paris with her husband Charles. She returns home following a short vacation, determined to divorce Charles only to discover their apartment has been stripped bare and that her husband has been murdered. The French police are in her apartment. Charles had liquidated their possessions for $1.8M and the money is missing.

Regina is soon reunited with a mysterious stranger Joshua (Mark Wahlberg) she met on her holiday. He helps her piece together the truth about the deceased Charlie and deal with three menacing people who are now following her.

== Cast ==
- Mark Wahlberg as Lewis Bartholomew (alias Joshua Peters)
- Stephen Dillane as Charlie
- Thandie Newton as Regina Lambert
- Sakina Jaffrey as Sylvia
- Christine Boisson as Commandant Dominique
- Simon Abkarian as Lieutenant Dessalines
- Park Joong-hoon as Lee Il-sang
- Lisa Gay Hamilton as Lola Jansco
- Ted Levine as Emil Zadapec
- Magali Noël as Mysterious woman in black
- Tim Robbins as Carson J. Dyle
- Agnès Varda as The widow Hyppolite
- Charles Aznavour as Himself
- Olivier Broche as Aznavour fan
- Manno Charlemagne as 'Chez Josephine' Maitre D'
- Anna Karina as Karina
- Philippe Katerine as Karina fan
- Philippe Duquesne as Café cook
- Kenneth Utt as The Late Monsieur Hyppolite
- Sotigui Kouyaté as Dealer Prophète
- Paula Moore as Ms. Hoskins
- Françoise Bertin as Woman on Train
- Jason Ainley as Smash Loser
- David Barco as Smash Champion
- Alban Lenoir as Skinhead

== Production ==
In December 2000, it was announced Jonathan Demme was finalizing plans to direct, write and produce a remake of the 1963 film Charade with Thandiwe Newton and Mark Wahlberg in talks to star. Due to how heavily Demme and his co-writers based the film upon Charade, it was determined that original writer Peter Stone had to be credited, but Stone felt uncomfortable placing his name on the film as he hadn't been involved and opted for the pseudonym Peter Joshua as a reference to an alias used by Cary Grant's character in Charade. Demme's unorthodox approach to the material was inspired by French New Wave and had wanted Universal to include the tagline "When in doubt, laugh" on the film's promotional materials but was rejected.

== Reception ==
The Truth About Charlie has 34% positive reviews on Rotten Tomatoes from 135 reviews. The website's consensus reads, "Newton has star quality, but this exercise in style can't hold a candle to the original." Metacritic, which uses a weighted average, assigned the film a score of 55 out of 100, based on 35 critics, indicating "mixed or average" reviews. Audiences polled by CinemaScore gave the film an average grade of "D" on an A+ to F scale.

Roger Ebert gave the film 3 out of 4 stars, highly praising Newton's performance and positively comparing it to Hepburn's in the original film. Ebert described the plot as working due to it entirely revolving around Newton's character, writing that "[Newton] carries 'The Truth About Charlie,' as she must, because all of the other characters revolve around her, sometimes literally... She has that presence and glow... 'The history of the cinema,' said Jean-Luc Godard, 'is of boys photographing girls.' There is more to it than that, but both 'The Truth About Charlie' and 'Charade' prove that is enough."
