= Jonathan Demme =

American filmmaker (1944–2017)

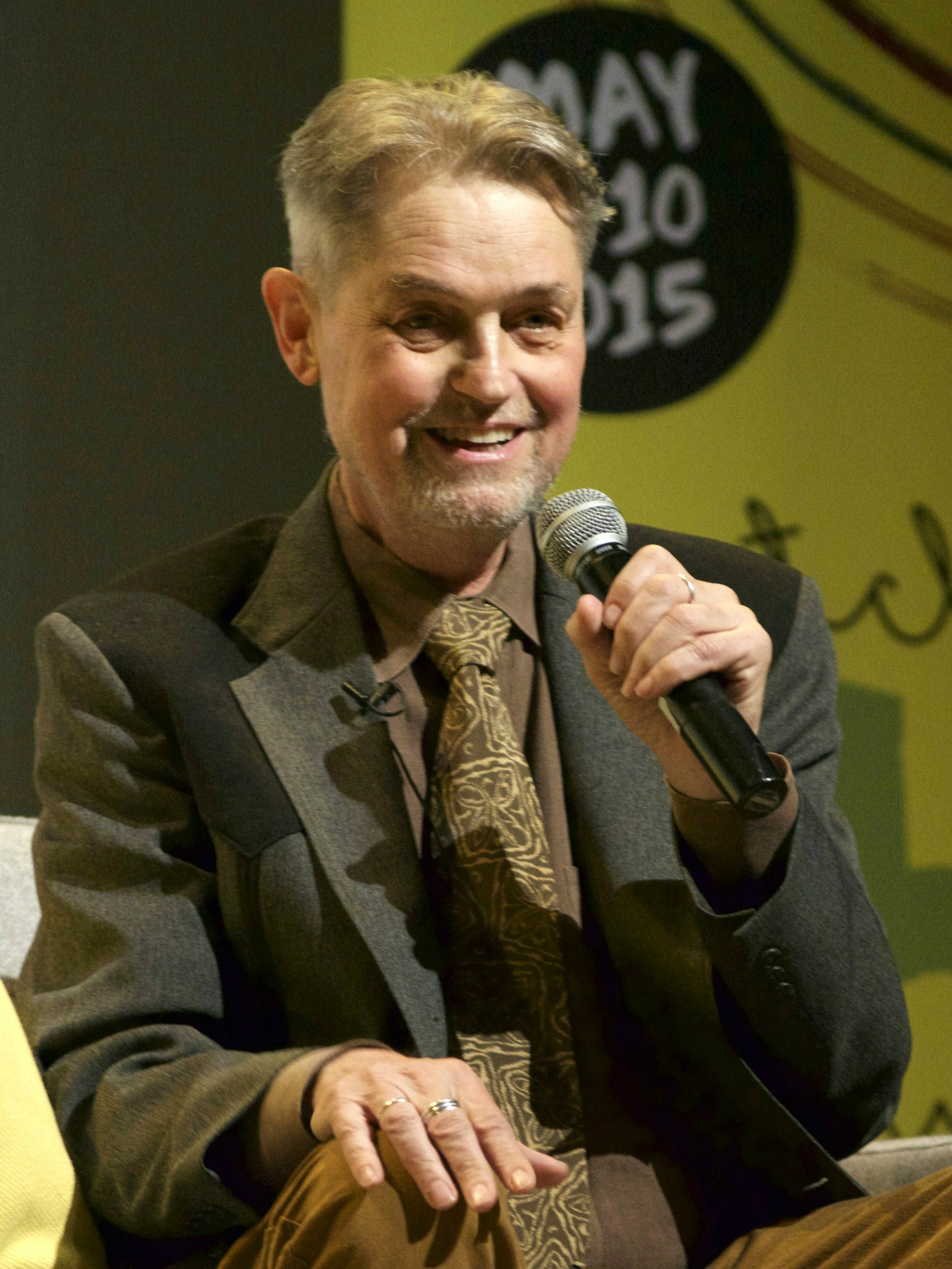
- Demme in 2015
- Born: Robert Jonathan Demme; February 22, 1944; Baldwin, New York, U.S.
- Died: April 26, 2017 (aged 73); New York City, U.S.
- Education: University of Florida
- Occupations: Director; producer; screenwriter
- Works: Full list
- Spouses: Evelyn Purcell (m. 1970; div. 1980) Joanne Howard (m. 1987)
- Children: 3
- Relatives: Robert W. Castle (cousin); Ted Demme (nephew)

Robert Jonathan Demme (/ˈdɛmi/ DEM-ee; February 22, 1944 – April 26, 2017) was an American filmmaker. His career of directing, producing, and screenwriting spanned more than 30 years and 70 feature films, documentaries, and television productions. In addition to being an Academy Award and a Directors Guild of America Award winner, he received nominations for a BAFTA Award, a Golden Globe Award, and three Independent Spirit Awards.

Beginning his career under B-movie producer Roger Corman, Demme made his directorial debut with the 1974 women-in-prison film Caged Heat, before becoming known for his casually humanist films such as Melvin and Howard (1980), Swing Shift (1984), Something Wild (1986), and Married to the Mob (1988). His 1991 psychological horror film The Silence of the Lambs, based on the novel of the same title, won five Academy Awards, including Best Director and Best Picture.

His subsequent films earned similar acclaim, notably the HIV/AIDS-themed drama Philadelphia (1993), the supernatural Gothic horror Beloved (1998), the conspiracy thriller The Manchurian Candidate (2004), and the independent drama Rachel Getting Married (2008). Demme also directed numerous concert films such as Stop Making Sense (1984), Neil Young: Heart of Gold (2006), and Justin Timberlake + The Tennessee Kids (2016), and worked on several television series as both a producer and director. Stop Making Sense, The Silence of the Lambs, and Philadelphia have been inducted into the National Film Registry.

== Early life ==
Demme was born on February 22, 1944, in Baldwin, New York, the son of Dorothy Louise (née Rogers) and Robert Eugene Demme, a public relations executive. He was raised in Rockville Centre, New York and Miami, where he graduated from Southwest Miami High School before attending the University of Florida.

== Career ==
=== Early films ===
Demme broke into feature film working for exploitation film producer Roger Corman early in his career, co-writing and producing Angels Hard as They Come (1971), a motorcycle movie very loosely based on Rashomon, and The Hot Box (1972). He then moved on to directing three films for Corman's studio New World Pictures: Caged Heat (1974), Crazy Mama (1975), and Fighting Mad (1976). After Fighting Mad, Demme directed the comedy film Handle with Care (originally titled Citizens Band, 1977) for Paramount Pictures. The film was well received by critics, but received little promotion, and performed poorly at the box office. He also directed a 1978 episode of Columbo.

Demme's next film, Melvin and Howard (1980), did not get a wide release, but received a groundswell of critical acclaim and film award recognition, including Academy Award nominations, winning two of its three nominations (Academy Award for Best Supporting Actress – Mary Steenburgen, and Academy Award for Best Original Screenplay – Bo Goldman). This acclaim led to the signing of Demme to direct the Goldie Hawn and Kurt Russell star vehicle Swing Shift (1984). Intended as a prestige picture for Warner Bros. as well as a major commercial vehicle for Demme, it instead became a troubled production due to the conflicting visions of Demme and star Hawn. Demme ended up renouncing the finished product, and when the film was released in May 1984, it was generally panned by critics and neglected by moviegoers. After Swing Shift, Demme stepped back from Hollywood to make the Talking Heads concert film Stop Making Sense (also 1984) which won the National Society of Film Critics Award for best documentary; the action-romantic comedy Something Wild (1986); a film-version of the stage production Swimming to Cambodia (1987), by monologist Spalding Gray; and the comedy Married to the Mob (1988).

Demme formed his production company, Clinica Estetico, with producers Edward Saxon and Peter Saraf in 1987. They were based out of New York City for fifteen years.

=== Later films ===
Demme won the Academy Award for The Silence of the Lambs (1991)—one of only three films to win all the major categories (Best Picture, Best Director, Best Screenplay, Best Actor, and Best Actress). Inspired by his friend Juan Suárez Botas's illness with AIDS and fueled by his own moral convictions, Demme then used his influence to make Philadelphia (1993), one of the first major films to address the AIDS crisis and which garnered star Tom Hanks his first Best Actor Oscar. He also co-directed (with his nephew Ted) the music video for Bruce Springsteen's Best Song Oscar-winning "Streets of Philadelphia" from the film's soundtrack. Jonathan used several of the same actors for both movies.

Subsequently, his films included an adaptation of Toni Morrison's Beloved (1998), and remakes of two films from the 1960s: The Truth About Charlie (2002), based on Charade, that starred Mark Wahlberg in the Cary Grant role; and The Manchurian Candidate (2004), with Denzel Washington and Meryl Streep. Demme's documentary film Man from Plains (2007), a documentary about former U.S. President Jimmy Carter's promotional tour publicizing his book Palestine: Peace Not Apartheid, had its premiere at the Venice Film Festival and Toronto International Film Festival.

His art-house hit Rachel Getting Married (2008) was compared by many critics to Demme's films of the late 1970s and 1980s. It was included in many 2008 "best of" lists, and received numerous awards and nominations, including an Academy Award nomination for Best Actress by lead Anne Hathaway. In 2010, Demme made his first foray into theater, directing Family Week, a play by Beth Henley. The play was produced by MCC Theater and co-starred Rosemarie DeWitt and Kathleen Chalfant.

At one time, Demme was signed on to direct, produce, and write an adaptation of Stephen King's sci-fi novel 11/22/63, but later left the project due to disagreements with King on what should be included in the script.

He returned to the concert documentary format with Justin Timberlake + the Tennessee Kids (2016), which he described as a "performance film, but also a portrait of an artist at a certain moment in the arc of his career", and his last project was a history of rock & roll for the Rock and Roll Hall of Fame compiled from footage from Hall of Fame induction ceremonies set to debut in summer 2017.

Demme directed music videos for artists such as Suburban Lawns, New Order, KRS-One's H.E.A.L. project and Bruce Springsteen. He also produced a compilation of Haitian music called Konbit: Burning Rhythms of Haiti that was released in 1989. (Lou Reed selected Konbit... as one of his 'picks of 1989').

Demme was on the board of directors at Jacob Burns Film Center in Pleasantville, New York. In addition to his role on the board, he curated and hosted a monthly series called Rarely Seen Cinema.

== Style ==
Throughout 1986–2004, Demme was known for his dramatic close-ups in films. This style of close-ups involves the character looking directly into the camera during crucial moments. According to Demme, this was done to put the viewer into the character's shoes. Beginning with Rachel Getting Married (2008), Demme adopted a documentary style of filmmaking.

He was known for his use of recurring supporting players, including Charles Napier, Harry Northup, Tracey Walter, Ann Dowd, LisaGay Hamilton, Kimberly Elise, Paul Lazar, Ron Vawter, Dean Stockwell, Obba Babatundé, Ted Levine, Paul Le Mat, Mary Steenburgen, Jason Robards, Scott Glenn, and his former producer Roger Corman, as well as casting musicians and bands in roles. These included Sister Carol, Chris Isaak, Tunde Adebimpe, the Feelies, Charles Aznavour, Steve Scales, the Flirtations, Manno Charlemagne, Bernie Worrell, David Johansen, Beau Sia, Q Lazzarus, Robyn Hitchcock, and Rick Springfield. In addition to Corman, Demme cast a number of other fellow directors in cameos, including John Sayles, Agnès Varda, George A. Romero, Sidney Lumet, and John Waters. Many of these performers received opening credits billing in films they appeared in, despite sometimes having only one or two lines.

Writer/director Paul Thomas Anderson has paid homage to Demme in his films and has cited him as a major influence in his work. In an interview, Anderson jokingly stated that the three filmmakers who inspired him the most are "Jonathan Demme, Jonathan Demme and Jonathan Demme." Other directors such as Alexander Payne and Wes Anderson have been known to be inspired by his close-ups in their own work.

== Political activism ==
Demme was involved in various political projects. In 1981, he directed a series of commercials for the liberal advocacy group People for the American Way. The spots, titled "Eggs", "Music", and "Sports", were produced by Norman Lear and featured Muhammad Ali, Carol Burnett, and Goldie Hawn celebrating Freedom of Expression. In 1985, he directed a video for Artists United Against Apartheid. The short, featured various international musicians including Afrika Bambaataa, Rubén Blades, Jimmy Cliff, Herbie Hancock, Little Steven, Run–D.M.C., and Bruce Springsteen, calling for a boycott of the South African luxury resort Sun City during Apartheid. His documentary Haiti Dreams of Democracy (1988) captured Haiti's era of democratic rebuilding after dictatorship, while his documentary The Agronomist (2008) profiled Haitian journalist and human rights activist Jean Dominique. Demme spent six years on the documentary I'm Carolyn Parker (2011), which highlighted rebuilding efforts in New Orleans Lower Ninth Ward after Hurricane Katrina.

== Personal life ==
Demme was married twice. His first marriage to Evelyn Purcell ended in divorce. In 1987, he married artist Joanne Howard, with whom he had three children. He was the uncle of film director Ted Demme, who died in 2002. Demme's cousin was the Rev. Robert Wilkinson Castle Jr., an Episcopal priest who appeared in some of Demme's films.

Demme was a member of the steering committee of the Friends of the Apollo Theater, Oberlin, Ohio, along with Danny DeVito and Rhea Perlman. In 2013, he returned to Oberlin as part of an alumni reunion during the class of 2013 graduation ceremony and received the award for Honorary Doctor of Fine Arts.

In 2009, Demme signed a petition in support of director Roman Polanski, who had been detained while traveling to a film festival in relation to his 1977 sexual abuse charges, which the petition argued would undermine the tradition of film festivals as a place for works to be shown "freely and safely", and that arresting filmmakers traveling to neutral countries could open the door "for actions of which no-one can know the effects."

Demme was an avid collector and devotee of Haitian art, in particular of Hector Hyppolite - so much so that he called it "an addiction". In 2014, he held an auction in Philadelphia selling thousands from his collection, much of which was donated to a cultural center in Port-au-Prince.

== Death ==
Demme died at his home in Manhattan on April 26, 2017, from complications from esophageal cancer and heart disease; he was 73.

"I am heart-broken to lose a friend, a mentor, a guy so singular and dynamic you'd have to design a hurricane to contain him. Jonathan was as quirky as his comedies and as deep as his dramas. He was pure energy, the unstoppable cheerleader for anyone creative. Just as passionate about music as he was about art, he was and will always be a champion of the soul. JD, most beloved, something wild, brother of love, director of the lambs. Love that guy. Love him so much."

— Jodie Foster's statement following Demme's death.

Director Brady Corbet dedicated his 2018 film Vox Lux to Demme's memory, as did Luca Guadagnino with his 2018 film Suspiria and Paul Thomas Anderson with his 2017 film Phantom Thread starring Daniel Day-Lewis. Demme is thanked in the credits of Spike Lee's 2020 concert film American Utopia starring David Byrne. The album A Beginner's Mind by musicians Sufjan Stevens and Angelo De Augustine is dedicated to Demme, with one of its songs, "Cimmerian Shade", mentioning him and referencing The Silence of the Lambs within its lyrics.

== Filmography ==
Narrative features
Year	Title	Distribution
1974	Caged Heat	New World Pictures
1975	Crazy Mama	New World Pictures
1976	Fighting Mad	20th Century Fox
1977	Handle with Care	Paramount Pictures
1979	Last Embrace	United Artists
1980	Melvin and Howard	Universal Pictures
1984	Swing Shift	Warner Bros.
1986	Something Wild	Orion Pictures
1988	Married to the Mob	Orion Pictures
1991	The Silence of the Lambs	Orion Pictures
1993	Philadelphia	TriStar Pictures
1998	Beloved	Buena Vista Pictures
2002	The Truth About Charlie	Universal Pictures
2004	The Manchurian Candidate	Paramount Pictures
2008	Rachel Getting Married	Sony Pictures Classics
2013	A Master Builder	Abramorama
2015	Ricki and the Flash	Sony Pictures Releasing

== Awards and nominations ==
Year	Award	Category	Work	Result
1992	Academy Award	Best Director	The Silence of the Lambs	Won
1992	BAFTA Award	Best Film	The Silence of the Lambs	Nominated
1992	BAFTA Award	Best Film Direction	The Silence of the Lambs	Nominated
1992	Golden Globe Award	Best Director – Motion Picture	The Silence of the Lambs	Nominated
1987	Grammy Award	Best Long Form Music Video	Sun City: Artists United Against Apartheid	Nominated
1988	Independent Spirit Award	Best Directing of a Feature Film	Swimming to Cambodia	Nominated
2009	Independent Spirit Award	Best Feature Film	Rachel Getting Married	Nominated
2009	Independent Spirit Award	Best Directing of a Feature Film	Rachel Getting Married	Nominated
1992	Directors Guild Award	Outstanding Directorial Achievement – Feature Film	The Silence of the Lambs	Won
1991	National Board of Review of Motion Pictures Award	Best Director	The Silence of the Lambs	Won
1980	New York Film Critics Circle Award	Best Directing	Melvin and Howard	Won
1991	New York Film Critics Circle Award	Best Directing	The Silence of the Lambs	Won
1991	Berlin Film Festival	Silver Bear Award for Best Director	The Silence of the Lambs	Won
1991	Berlin Film Festival	Golden Bear Award for Best Film	The Silence of the Lambs	Nominated
1994	Berlin Film Festival	Golden Bear Award for Best Film	Philadelphia	Nominated

Awards and nominations received by Demme's films
Year	Title	Academy Awards		BAFTA Awards		Golden Globe Awards	
Year	Title	Nominations	Wins	Nominations	Wins	Nominations	Wins
1980	Melvin and Howard	3	2			4	1
1984	Swing Shift	1				1	
1986	Something Wild					3	
1988	Married to the Mob	1				1	
1991	The Silence of the Lambs	7	5	9	2	5	1
1993	Philadelphia	5	2	1		3	2
1998	Beloved	1					
2004	The Manchurian Candidate			1		1	
2008	Rachel Getting Married	1				1	
Total		19	9	11	2	19	4

Directed Academy Award Performances

Year	Performer	Film	Result
Academy Award for Best Actor
1991	Anthony Hopkins	The Silence of the Lambs	Won
1993	Tom Hanks	Philadelphia	Won
Academy Award for Best Supporting Actor
1980	Jason Robards	Melvin and Howard	Nominated
1988	Dean Stockwell	Married to the Mob	Nominated
Academy Award for Best Actress
1991	Jodie Foster	The Silence of the Lambs	Won
2008	Anne Hathaway	Rachel Getting Married	Nominated
Academy Award for Best Supporting Actress
1980	Mary Steenburgen	Melvin and Howard	Won
1984	Christine Lahti	Swing Shift	Nominated
