= Justified: The Videos =

Video by Justin Timberlake
- Released: September 23, 2003
- Recorded: 2002–2003
- Length: 65 minutes
- Label: Jive

Justin Timberlake chronology
| Justified: The Videos (2003) | Live from London (2003) |

Justified: The Videos is the first live video album by American singer-songwriter Justin Timberlake released on September 23, 2003, through Jive Records. The collection compiles all four music videos from Justin Timberlake's debut album, along with live performances. It also includes exclusive behind-the-scenes footage and offers a comprehensive visual overview of Timberlake's transition from NSYNC member to solo artist.

From a critical standpoint, the project garnered favorable reviews that acknowledged its technical merits and contribution to the artist's evolving musical identity, though some commentators noted selective editing choices in the final presentation. Commercially, the release reached the Top 10 on Billboard's Top Music Videos in the United States and was certified gold by the Recording Industry Association of America (RIAA).

== DVD details ==
The collection includes all four music videos from his debut studio album, Justified (2002), complemented by archival performances from the 2002 MTV Video Music Awards and MTV Live in Times Square. The DVD also incorporates exclusive behind-the-scenes material from MTV's Making the Video series.

Notable content features Timberlake's televised appearance at the Brit Awards 2003 alongside live renditions of his signature tracks, including "Rock Your Body", "Like I Love You", "Señorita" and "Cry Me a River". The release serves as a comprehensive visual companion to Timberlake's transition from NSYNC member to solo artist, capturing his early career milestones in a single package.

== Critical reception ==
Professional ratings
Review scores
| Source | Rating |
|---|---|
| Herald Sun | 4/5 stars |
| DVDMagazine | 3/5 stars |

Cameron Adams from the newspaper Herald Sun wrote that Justin Timberlake has become the benchmark for "cool pop", highlighting the DVD as a prime example. He praised the diversity of its content, from iconic performances like "Like I Love You"—which he considered one of the best pop songs of the decade—to the intense and "slightly psycho" "Cry Me a River". However, he pointed out with curiosity the absence of Kylie Minogue and her famous performance at the Brit Awards, which was cut from the material.

Robson Candêo from the Brazilian website DVDMagazine offered a positive perspective, highlighting both technical and content aspects. He mentioned that the material includes the singer's live performances for MTV, along with well-produced behind-the-scenes footage from the music video shoots. Candêo also praised the high-quality WideScreen productions of the "Cry Me a River" and "Rock Your Body" videos, emphasizing their strong visual production. While noting that the artist wasn't well-regarded by rock critics at the time, Candêo reinforced Timberlake's appeal among teenage audiences, recalling his roots on the Disney Channel and Mickey Mouse Club in the 1990s.

== Commercial performance ==
The DVD debuted at No. 10 on Billboard's Top Music Videos chart, which remained its peak position. In the Uk, it entered the music video charts at No. 4 on October 11, 2003, maintaining this peak for two consecutive weeks. It spent 13 weeks total on the UK chart, eventually exiting at No. 36 on January 3, 2004.

== Track listing ==
| No. | Title | Length |
|---|---|---|
| 1. | "Like I Love You (Music Video)" | 4:45 |
| 2. | "Like I Love You (MTV's Making The Video - Excerpts)" | 9:55 |
| 3. | "Cry Me A River (Music Video)" | 4:48 |
| 4. | "Like I Love You (2002 MTV Video Music Awards Performance)" | 4:39 |
| 5. | "Like I Love You (MTV TRL Live In Times Square Performance)" | 3:57 |
| 6. | "Cry Me A River (MTV TRL Live In Times Square Performance)" | 4:06 |
| 7. | "Rock Your Body (Music Video)" | 5:04 |
| 8. | "Rock Your Body (MTV's Making The Video - Excerpts)" | 10:09 |
| 9. | "Señorita (Music Video)" | 4:36 |
| 10. | "MTV's Launch - Excerpts" | 10:00 |
| 11. | "2003 Brit Awards Performance" | 2:39 |

== Personnel ==
- Credits adapted from the DVD Justified: The Videos.
- DVD Supervision: Jeff Dodes
- DVD Authoring: Chris Haggerty
- Audio Mastering: Chaz Harper
- Audio Supervision: Bob Schwall

== Charts ==
Weekly chart performance for Justified: The Videos
| Chart (2003) | Peak position |
|---|---|
| UK Video Charts | 4 |
| US Billboard Top Music Videos | 10 |

== Certifications ==
| Region | Certification | Certified units/sales |
|---|---|---|
| United States (RIAA) | Gold | 50,000^{^} |
^{^} Shipments figures based on certification alone.

== Release history ==
| Country | Date | Label | Ref. |
|---|---|---|---|
| United States | September 23, 2003 | Jive | |
