= I'm Lovin' It (song) =

2003 single by Justin Timberlake

Single by Justin Timberlake

from the album Live from London
- B-side: "Last Night"
- Released: November 20, 2003
- Recorded: 2003
- Studio: Hovercraft Recording (Virginia); Hit Factory Criteria (Miami); Record Plant (Los Angeles)
- Length: 3:42
- Label: Jive
- Songwriters: Pharrell Williams; Tom Batoy; Franco Tortora; Andreas Forberger
- Producer: The Neptunes

Justin Timberlake singles chronology
"Señorita" (2003)	"I'm Lovin' It" (2003)	"Signs" (2005)

"I'm Lovin' It" is a song by American singer-songwriter Justin Timberlake. The song, originally written as a jingle for American fast food chain McDonald's, was produced by the Neptunes and is credited as being written by Pharrell Williams, Tom Batoy, Franco Tortora, and Andreas Forberger. It was released as a single on November 20, 2003, and became a chart hit in a few European countries, reaching the top 20 in Greece, Ireland, and the Netherlands.

== Background ==
The song was written as a jingle for McDonald's commercials based on a pre-existing German campaign originally developed as "Ich Liebe Es." Timberlake was paid $6 million to sing the jingle; despite this, Timberlake has since regretted the deal. Soon thereafter, the Neptunes produced a song based on the jingle and released it (along with an instrumental version) as part of a three-track EP in November 2003. A digital download EP with the same name was also released through the iTunes Store on December 16, 2003. The extended play included the title-track and a remix for all of the singles from Timberlake's first solo studio album, Justified. The song was also included on the bonus audio CD of Timberlake's first live DVD, Live From London.

Rapper Pusha T revealed his involvement with the song in June 2016 and claimed that he had created the "I'm Lovin' It" jingle. However, co-writers Batoy and Tortora, as well as several others involved with the jingle's creation, have disputed his claim. Larry Light, former McDonald's chief marketing executive, has denied Pusha T's claim. Nevertheless, Pusha T's rap vocals do appear on the track for the first ad to air with the new hook and slogan; however, he was only paid on a one-time basis without royalties.

== Music video ==
A music video to promote the single was released in late 2003 and was directed by Paul Hunter. In the video, Timberlake is seen chasing Lindsay Frimodt around New York City. The music video on YouTube has received over 15 million views as of April 2024.

== Track listings ==
- European CD single
1. "I'm Lovin' It" – 3:42
2. "I'm Lovin' It" (instrumental) – 3:42
3. "Last Night" – 4:47
- Digital download EP
1. "I'm Lovin' It" – 3:48
2. "Rock Your Body" (Sander Kleinenberg Just in the Club mix) – 9:42
3. "Cry Me a River" (Dirty Vegas vocal mix) – 8:21
4. "Like I Love You" (Basement Jaxx vocal mix) – 6:12
5. "Señorita" (Num Club mix) – 7:53

== Credits and personnel ==
Credits are lifted from the European CD single liner notes.

Studios

- Recorded at Hovercraft Recording Studios (Virginia, US), The Hit Factory Criteria (Miami, Florida, US), and the Record Plant (Los Angeles, California, US)
- Mixed at MixStar Studios (Virginia Beach, Virginia, US)
- Mastered at The Hit Factory (New York City, US)

Personnel

- Pharrell Williams – writing, all instruments
- Tom Batoy – writing
- Franco Tortora – writing
- Andreas Forberger – writing
- Chad Hugo – all instruments
- The Neptunes – production
- Andrew Coleman – recording
- Brian Garten – recording (Record Plant)
- Serban Ghenea – mixing
- John Hanes – additional Pro Tools engineering
- Daniel Betancourt – engineering assistance
- Steve Robillard – engineering assistance
- Jun Ishizeki – engineering assistance
- Tim Roberts – engineering assistance
- Herb Powers, Jr. – mastering
- Fredrik Peterhoff – art direction

== Charts ==
Chart (2003–2004)	Peak position
Austria (Ö3 Austria Top 40)	55
Belgium (Ultratop 50 Flanders)	25
Belgium (Ultratip Bubbling Under Wallonia)	1
CIS Airplay (TopHit)	64
Greece (IFPI)	17
Hungary (Single Top 40)	6
Ireland (IRMA)	15
Netherlands (Dutch Top 40)	13
Netherlands (Single Top 100)	27
Romania (Romanian Top 100)	90
Sweden (Sverigetopplistan)	43
Switzerland (Schweizer Hitparade)	47
UK Singles (Official Charts)	79
UK Airplay (Music Week)	16
UK Hip Hop/R&B (Official Charts)	28

== Release history ==
Region	Date	Format	Label	Ref.
Spain	November 20, 2003	Digital download	Sony Music Entertainment	
Singapore	November 20, 2003	Digital download	Sony Music Entertainment	
Germany	December 1, 2003	Digital download	Sony Music Entertainment	
Germany	December 1, 2003	Maxi single	Sony Music Entertainment	
Luxembourg	December 1, 2003	Digital download	Sony Music Entertainment	
France	December 9, 2003	Digital download	Sony Music Entertainment	
United States	December 16, 2003	Digital download	Sony Music Entertainment	
