= Justin Timberlake: Live from London =

Video by Justin Timberlake
- Released: December 15, 2003
- Recorded: 2002–2003
- Label: Jive
- Producer: The Neptunes

Justin Timberlake chronology
Justified: The Videos (2003)	Justin Timberlake: Live from London (2003)	FutureSex/LoveShow: Live from Madison Square Garden (2007)

Singles from Justin Timberlake: Live from London
- 1. "I'm Lovin' It" Released: November 20, 2003

Justin Timberlake: Live from London is the first live video album by American singer-songwriter Justin Timberlake. It was released on December 15, 2003, by Jive Records. It documents Timberlake's performance at the London Arena on May 18, 2003.

== Track listing ==
DVD
No.	Title	Length
1.	"Intro"
2.	"Rock Your Body"
3.	"Right for Me"
4.	"Gone/Girlfriend/Señorita"
5.	"Nothin' Else"
6.	"Tap Dance"
7.	"Cry Me a River"
8.	"Like I Love You"

DVD (bonus features)
No.	Title	Length
9.	"Tour Photo Diary"
10.	"I'm Lovin' It" (music video)

Bonus Audio CD
No.	Title	Writer(s)	Producer(s)	Length
1.	"I'm Lovin' It" (featuring Vanessa Marquez)	Pharrell Williams; Tom Batoy; Andreas Forberger; Franco Tortora	The Neps
2.	"Worthy Of"	Justin Timberlake; Carvin Haggins; Ivan Barias; Frank Romano; Valvin Roane; James Mitchell Jr.; Marvin Willis; Arnold Ingram	Carvin "Ransum" Haggins & Ivan "Orthodox" Barias
3.	"Rock Your Body" (Paul Oakenfold Mix)	Justin Timberlake; Chad Hugo; Pharrell Williams	The Neps; Paul Oakenfold
4.	"Señorita" (Eddie Arroyo Radio Mix)	Justin Timberlake; Chad Hugo; Pharrell Williams	The Neps; Eddie Arroyo

== Chart positions ==
Chart (2004)	Peak position
US Billboard Music DVD Chart	11

== Certifications ==
Region	Certification	Certified units/sales
Australia (ARIA)	Platinum	15,000^{^}
United Kingdom (BPI)	Gold	25,000^{*}
United States (RIAA)	Gold	50,000^{^}
^{*} Sales figures based on certification alone.^{^} Shipments figures based on certification alone.

== Release history ==
Country	Date	Label	Ref.
Germany	December 15, 2003	Sony	
United Kingdom	December 15, 2003	RCA	
United States	December 16, 2003	Jive	
