= Justified =

Justified may refer to:

- Justified (album), an album by Justin Timberlake
- "Justified" (song), a single by Kacey Musgraves
- Justified (TV series), an American television drama series
- "Justified" (A Day to Remember song), a 2016 song from the album Bad Vibrations
- "Justified?", a 1994 song by Sphere Lazza
- Maa Kheru (English translation: "Justified" or "True of Voice"), an ancient Egyptian epithet for venerable deceased
- Justified alignment, a typographic alignment in typesetting and page layout.

== See also ==
- Justification (disambiguation)
- Justifide, a Christian rock band, 1999–2003
- Justify (disambiguation)
