= Justify =

Justify may refer to:

- Justify (horse), winner of the 2018 U.S. Thoroughbred Triple Crown (Kentucky Derby, Preakness Stakes, and Belmont Stakes)
- Justify (ANSI), an ANSI escape sequence
- "Justify" (ATB song)
- "Justify" (The Rasmus song)
- "Justify", a song by The Red Jumpsuit Apparatus

== See also ==
- Justified (disambiguation)
- Justifier (disambiguation)
- Justification (disambiguation)
