= The Justified World Tour =

2003–04 concert tour by Justin Timberlake

- World tour by Justin Timberlake
- Promotional banner for the 2004 leg
- Associated album: Justified
- Start date: May 7, 2003
- End date: June 19, 2004
- Legs: 4
- No. of shows: 61

Justin Timberlake concert chronology
- The Justified World Tour (2003–04); The Justified & Stripped Tour (2003)

The Justified World Tour (also known as the Justified and Lovin' It Live) was the debut solo concert tour by American singer-songwriter Justin Timberlake. The tour showcased material from his debut studio album, Justified (2002).

== Background ==
In September 2003, McDonald's announced Timberlake as a new spokesperson for their "I'm Lovin' It" campaign. Timberlake recorded "I'm Lovin' It" to be featured in ads for the franchise, later expanded and released as a single in December 2003. McDonald's later announced they will sponsor a tour for Timberlake, following his successful North American tour with Christina Aguilera. Timberlake stated, "I love what McDonald's is doing with the new 'i'm lovin' it' campaign and it's cool to be part of it [...] We share the same crowd -- people who like to have fun -- and that's what this new partnership and my European concert tour is all about." The tour began with Timberlake playing intimate gigs at clubs and theaters in the United States and Australia before expanding to arenas in Europe. After select shows in the UK, Timberlake performed at local clubs and theaters following his performance in that city.

== Opening acts ==
- Lemar (Europe, select venues)
- Solange (United Kingdom)
- Fefe Dobson (Europe, select venues)

== Set list ==
1. "Rock Your Body"
2. "Right for Me"
3. "Gone"
4. "Girlfriend"
5. "Señorita"
6. "Still on My Brain"
7. "Nothin' Else"
8. "Cry Me a River"
9. "Let's Take a Ride"
10. "Beatbox" (Interlude)
11. "Last Night"
12. "Take It from Here"
13. "Like I Love You"

== Tour dates ==
List of concerts, showing date, city, country and venue
Date	City	Country	Venue
Europe
May 7, 2003	Sheffield	England	Hallam FM Arena
May 9, 2003	Manchester	England	Manchester Evening News Arena
May 10, 2003	Manchester	England	Manchester Evening News Arena
May 11, 2003	Newcastle	England	Telewest Arena
May 12, 2003	Birmingham	England	NEC Arena
May 14, 2003	London	England	Wembley Arena
May 15, 2003	London	England	Wembley Arena
May 17, 2003	London	England	London Arena
May 18, 2003	London	England	London Arena
May 19, 2003	London	England	London Arena
May 20, 2003	London	England	London Arena
May 22, 2003	Dublin	Ireland	Point Theatre
May 23, 2003	Dublin	Ireland	Point Theatre
North America
October 13, 2003	Washington, D.C.	United States	9:30 Club
October 14, 2003	Norfolk	United States	The NorVa
October 16, 2003	Cleveland	United States	Agora Theatre
October 17, 2003	Detroit	United States	State Theatre
October 19, 2003	Memphis	United States	The New Daisy Theatre
Europe
November 16, 2003	Ghent	Belgium	Flanders Sports Arena
November 17, 2003	Cologne	Germany	Kölnarena
November 19, 2003	Munich	Germany	Olympiahalle
November 22, 2003	Zürich	Switzerland	Hallenstadion
November 24, 2003	Frankfurt	Germany	Festhalle Frankfurt
November 25, 2003	Berlin	Germany	Velodrom
November 26, 2003	Arnhem	Netherlands	GelreDome XS
November 29, 2003	Paris	France	Palais Omnisports de Paris-Bercy
November 30, 2003	Paris	France	Palais Omnisports de Paris-Bercy
December 1, 2003	Birmingham	England	National Indoor Arena
December 2, 2003	Birmingham	England	National Indoor Arena
December 3, 2003	Birmingham	England	National Indoor Arena
December 5, 2003	London	England	Earls Court Exhibition Centre
December 6, 2003	London	England	Earls Court Exhibition Centre
December 7, 2003	London	England	Earls Court Exhibition Centre
December 8, 2003	London	England	Earls Court Exhibition Centre
December 10, 2003	Manchester	England	Manchester Evening News Arena
December 11, 2003	Manchester	England	Manchester Evening News Arena
December 12, 2003	Manchester	England	Manchester Evening News Arena
December 14, 2003	Sheffield	England	Hallam FM Arena
December 15, 2003	Sheffield	England	Hallam FM Arena
December 17, 2003	Belfast	Northern Ireland	Odyssey Arena
December 18, 2003	Belfast	Northern Ireland	Odyssey Arena
December 20, 2003	Dublin	Ireland	Point Theatre
December 21, 2003	Dublin	Ireland	Point Theatre
January 9, 2004	London	England	Earls Court Exhibition Centre
January 10, 2004	London	England	Earls Court Exhibition Centre
January 11, 2004	London	England	Earls Court Exhibition Centre
January 14, 2004	Glasgow	Scotland	Scottish Exhibition and Conference Centre
January 15, 2004	Glasgow	Scotland	Scottish Exhibition and Conference Centre
January 16, 2004	Glasgow	Scotland	Scottish Exhibition and Conference Centre
January 18, 2004	Birmingham	England	National Indoor Arena
January 19, 2004	Birmingham	England	National Indoor Arena
January 21, 2004	Newcastle	England	Telewest Arena
January 22, 2004	Newcastle	England	Telewest Arena
January 23, 2004	Manchester	England	Manchester Evening News Arena
January 24, 2004	Manchester	England	Manchester Evening News Arena
January 25, 2004	Manchester	England	Manchester Evening News Arena
Australia
June 11, 2004	Melbourne	Australia	Festival Hall
June 12, 2004	Melbourne	Australia	Festival Hall
June 13, 2004	Melbourne	Australia	Festival Hall
June 16, 2004	Sydney	Australia	Hordern Pavilion
June 17, 2004	Sydney	Australia	Hordern Pavilion
June 18, 2004	Sydney	Australia	Hordern Pavilion
June 19, 2004	Brisbane	Australia	Brisbane Convention Centre

== Broadcasts and recordings ==
A live video album titled Justin Timberlake: Live from London was released on December 16, 2003.

== See also ==
- I'm Lovin' It Campaign
