= Justification =

Justification may refer to:

- Reason (argument)
- Justification (epistemology), a property of beliefs that a person has good reasons for holding
- Justification (jurisprudence), defence in a prosecution for a criminal offenses
- Justification (theology), God's act of declaring or making a sinner righteous before God
- Justification (typesetting), a kind of typographic alignment
- Rationalization (making excuses), a phenomenon in psychology

== See also ==
- Justified (disambiguation)
- Justify (disambiguation)
