= Lindsay Frimodt =

American model and fashion designer

- Born: March 28, 1981 (age 45); Sacramento, California, U.S.
- Occupations: Fashion model, fashion designer
- Years active: 2002–present
- Height: 5 ft 9 in (1.76 m)
- Partner: Seann William Scott (2012–2013)

Lindsay Frimodt (born March 28, 1981) is an American fashion model and fashion designer. She appeared in the annual Victoria's Secret Fashion Show in 2002 and 2003.

== Life and career ==
Lindsay Frimodt was born on March 28, 1981, in Sacramento, California.

Her advertisement campaigns include Donna Karan, Michael Kors, Giorgio Armani, Narciso Rodriguez, Zac Posen, Jill Stuart and Calvin Klein. She has appeared in the pages of Harper's Bazaar, Elle, Marie Claire, and Vogue. Frimodt has appeared on the cover of Russia's Harper's Bazaar, France's Bira, Italy's Vogue's Beauty Supplement and US' Planet and City. She walked the runway for Victoria's Secret's annual fashion show in 2002 and 2003. She was featured in Justin Timberlake's music video for "I'm Lovin' It" and Amr Diab's video for "Lealy Nahary".

She also works as a fashion designer and teamed up with Superbright to create an augmented reality for her "Lindsay’s Designs" during the fashion week in 2016.The audience at the fashion show used mobile devices to run the application in order to get a whole new perspective on the models and clothes.

== Personal life ==
In 2011, she began dating actor Seann William Scott and the couple became engaged in March 2012. In January 2013, media outlets reported that the engagement had ended and the two had split as friends.

== Filmography ==
Television roles
Year	Title	Role	Notes
2002	The Victoria's Secret Fashion Show	Herself / model	TV special
2003	The Victoria's Secret Fashion Show	Herself / model	TV special

Music videos
Year	Title	Artist
2003	"I'm Lovin' It"	Justin Timberlake
2004	"Lealy Nahary"	Amr Diab
