= Poseidon (Justifiers) =

Poseidon is a 1989 role-playing game adventure published by StarChilde for Justifiers.

== Plot summary ==
Poseidon is an adventure in which the player characters explore a water-world on behalf of their corporation. During their mission, they encounter rivals and indigenous mer-people. The scenario introduces new types of beta-humanoid, including alligator, frog, hellbender, sea snake, and snapping turtle.

== Publication history ==
Poseidon was written by Jim Adams with illustrations by Tim Dzon and published by StarChilde in 1989 as a 64-page digest-sized book.
