= The Corporate Sourcebook =

The Corporate Sourcebook is a 1989 role-playing game supplement published by StarChilde for Justifiers.

== Contents ==
The Corporate Sourcebook is a supplement in which six major corporations and the worlds they govern are detailed. It includes short sections on seven minor corporations and covers aspects such as corporate history, organization, weapons, equipment, and vehicles.

== Publication history ==
The Corporate Sourcebook was written by Gideon with Andrew Barlow and published by StarChilde in 1989 as a 96-page digest-sized book.
