= Justified (album) =

2002 studio album by Justin Timberlake

Studio album by Justin Timberlake
- Released: November 5, 2002
- Recorded: 2002
- Genre: R&B
- Length: 63:15
- Label: Jive
- Producers: The Neptunes; Timbaland; Scott Storch; The Underdogs; Brian McKnight

Justin Timberlake chronology
| Justified (2002) | Justin & Christina (2003) |

Singles from Justified
- 1. "Like I Love You" Released: September 17, 2002; 2. "Cry Me a River" Released: November 25, 2002; 3. "Rock Your Body" Released: March 17, 2003; 4. "Señorita" Released: July 7, 2003

Justified is the debut solo studio album by American singer Justin Timberlake. It was released on November 5, 2002, by Jive Records. The album was written and recorded in a six-week period as Timberlake's boy band NSYNC was on hiatus. For his solo album, he began to adopt a more mature image as an R&B artist, as opposed to the previous pop music recorded by the group. The majority of the album was produced by the Neptunes (credited as "Williams and Hugo") and Timbaland, and features guest appearances by Janet Jackson, Clipse, and Bubba Sparxxx. It primarily is an R&B album that also contains influences of dance-pop, funk, and soul music.

Justified received generally positive reviews from critics, who complimented the mature progression of Timberlake's material, although some criticized its lyrical content. The album earned Timberlake four Grammy Award nominations, including Album of the Year, and won the award for Best Pop Vocal Album. Justified topped the album charts in Ireland, Scotland, and the United Kingdom while reaching the top ten in Australia, Belgium, Canada, Denmark, Finland, the Netherlands, New Zealand, Norway, and the United States. By 2012, it had sold over 10 million copies worldwide, making it one of the best-selling albums of the 21st century.

Four singles were released from Justified. The lead single "Like I Love You" peaked at number 11 on the US Billboard Hot 100, while the follow-up singles "Cry Me a River" and "Rock Your Body" peaked within the top five on the chart. "Like I Love You", "Cry Me a River", and "Rock Your Body" peaked at number two in the United Kingdom and in the top ten in Australia (with "Rock Your Body" topping the Australian chart), Ireland, Netherlands, and Belgium. To promote the album, Timberlake performed on several television shows and award ceremonies, including the 2002 MTV Video Music Awards, where he made his solo debut appearance. Furthermore, Timberlake embarked on two concert tours—The Justified World Tour and the Justified & Stripped Tour—with Christina Aguilera accompanying him on the latter.

== Background ==
Following the conclusion of their Celebrity Tour in April 2002, boy band NSYNC went on a hiatus, during which co-lead singer Justin Timberlake began work on what would be his debut solo album. With the album, he wanted to portray a more mature image as an R&B performer, rather than a boy band pop artist. He revealed minimal information regarding the producers and artists involved with Justified during its early recording stage, with his management and record label also reluctant to share any information. However, MTV News reported that production duo The Neptunes were working on multiple tracks, while rapper P. Diddy and singer Mario Winans contributed to one track. Other known producers involved included Mike City, Raphael Saadiq and Rodney Jerkins, though between June and July, none of the aforementioned producers had attended any studio sessions. Explaining his involvement with the project, Jerkins said at the 2002 BET Awards that he "just got a call about working on the project" and that whenever Timberlake wanted his assistance, it would "be done". The majority of the tracks the Neptunes produced for Justified were originally intended for Michael Jackson. Since Jackson turned down the tracks, the songs were modified for Timberlake's album.

Brian McKnight's manager stated that his client had already recorded tracks with the singer, while rapper Nelly explained to the reporters that both him and Timberlake had discussed a collaboration effort. Early in 2002, Angie Stone revealed that Timberlake "loves the Mahogany Soul album" with him further saying to her "your CD's in my car right now, you have to work on my solo project". These assertions were later partially denied by a Jive Records spokesperson who announced that the material produced from the collaboration would not appear on the finalized record.

== Recording ==
We picked him up right after he checked into his hotel. We drove around in the car listening to old Earth, Wind & Fire albums, and he was totally with it. The background of those songs is the feeling we wanted to incorporate into the music. He was like, 'Nobody's ever heard anything like that before ... a white boy singing this kind of music.' He didn't care what people would say.

— Chad Hugo, MTV News

Justified was written and recorded in a six-week period. According to Timberlake, the "creative spurt" was reminiscent of "that period of time back in the 1960s and '70s when musicians got together and just jammed and worked out of inspiration. There was no heavy calculation or belaboring songs and mixes. Everything flowed pretty easily and naturally." Recording sessions took place at various studios in the United States, including the Westlake Recording Studios in Los Angeles, Manhattan Center Studios in New York City and Master Sound Recording Studios and Windmark Recording in Virginia Beach.

The Neptunes told MTV News that the duo and Timberlake drove in a car listening to Earth, Wind & Fire albums for inspiration, with the background of the band's music being what the production duo wanted to implement into Justified's musical content. The production duo commented that despite not being content with sampling music, for inspiration, they also listened to both Off the Wall (1979) and Thriller (1982), albums by Jackson. Their intentions were to create music that was similar to Jackson's work without "recycling them". One of the two members of The Neptunes, Chad Hugo, commented that they just wanted to re-create "that sense of those timeless, classic songs, without any of the 'bling, bling, hit me on my two-way' style of the new R&B. It has elements of the old and the new." The producer further went on to say that people wanted Timberlake to be conformed to being part of boy band NSYNC, with the former insisting that the singer is an immaculate vocalist. Hugo acknowledged Timberlake's breakup with singer Britney Spears, saying that some of the album's music could be directed towards it.

== Music and lyrics ==
"Cry Me a River"
A 27-second sample of "Cry Me a River", which uses beatboxing, synthesizers, Arabian-inspired riffs and Gregorian chants.

The opening track on Justified, "Señorita" is a Spanish oriented song that features R&B influences; in it Timberlake sings about a girl with brown eyes. "Like I Love You" is a funk influenced song consisted of live drums, tiny guitar strum accompanied with the singer's breathy tenor. According to Ben Ratliff of Rolling Stone, "it's minimalism influenced by Michael Jackson". The third track on the album, "(Oh No) What You Got" was described by Sal Cinquemani of Slant Magazine as a bit racy for the audience who expected a more boy-band-oriented record. Regarding the fourth song, Russell Bailie of The New Zealand Herald wrote that although the album "manages to skirt teen-pop sugariness for the most part, though it does offer quality mush on numbers such as 'Take It From Here'." "Cry Me a River" is a funk and R&B song with an instrumentation that features beatboxing, synthesizers, Arabian-inspired riffs and Gregorian chants. Lyrically, the song is about a brokenhearted man who moves on from his past.

"Rock Your Body"
"Rock Your Body", incorporates tinny, "keyboard-set-to-emulate-clavichord" synthesizers of The Neptunes' late 90s productions, overlaid with "keys and a propulsive drum vamp".

The sixth track, "Rock Your Body", incorporates tinny, "keyboard-set-to-emulate-clavichord" synthesizers of The Neptunes' late 90s productions, overlaid with "keys and a propulsive drum vamp". The seventh track of the album is "Nothin' Else"; which according to David Merryweather of Drowned in Sound is a "slinky" and "smooth" song that is similar to the works of American musician Stevie Wonder. Influenced by Jackson's musical style and Van McCoy's 1975 single "The Hustle", "Last Night" is played with a xylophone. "Still On My Brain", the ninth track on the album, is a slow jam, similar to the songs performed by Timberlake's former band 'NSYNC. "(And She Said) Take Me Now" which features singer Janet Jackson, is a disco, '80s funk and dub song that contains racy lyrics. Similar to the previous song, "Right For Me", the eleventh track of the album has racy lyrics and features rapper Bubba Sparxxx; on it Timberlake "cockily" sings the line, "I could think of a couple positions for you". "Let's Take a Ride" is the twelfth song on the album, on which, according to Uncut magazine, Timberlake "offers to deliver you from your humdrum existence". The record concludes with "Never Again", a Brian McKnight produced ballad, on which Timberlake becomes "downright maudlin and snippy".

== Singles ==
"Like I Love You" featuring Clipse was released as the album's lead single. It was released as a CD single in August 2002 in Germany and the US. The song was written by Justin Timberlake and The Neptunes, who also produced the track. It received positive reviews from critics, who praised its production and use of instrumentals. "Like I Love You" charted at number eleven on the US Billboard Hot 100, and in the top five in the UK, Denmark, Netherlands and Ireland. The song was nominated for Best Rap/Sung Collaboration at the 45th Grammy Awards.

Justified's second single is "Cry Me a River", and was released through contemporary and rhythmic radio on November 24, 2002, and as a 12" vinyl on December 23 in the US. The song was written by Timberlake, Scott Storch and Timbaland and produced by the latter. "Cry Me a River" debuted at number 44 on the Billboard Hot 100 on the issue dated December 21, 2002, and eventually peaked at number three. In other countries, the song achieved similar success, reaching number two in Australia and the UK, and the top five in several other territories. "Cry Me a River" has been certified gold in Australia by the Australian Recording Industry Association (ARIA), denoting shipments of 70,000 units, and certified silver in France. It won a Grammy Award for Best Male Pop Vocal Performance at the 2004 ceremony, while the accompanying music video won two MTV Video Music Awards: Best Male Video and Best Pop Video. The song is listed on Rolling Stone's The 500 Greatest Songs of All Time.

"Rock Your Body" was released as the album's third single, and was released on May 6, 2003, as a CD single in the US. It was written by Timberlake and The Neptunes, and produced by the latter. The song topped the charts in Australia for one week, became Timberlake's third single to reach number two in the UK, and reached the top five in Denmark, Ireland, New Zealand and the US. "Rock Your Body" was certified platinum in Australia by the ARIA. It received a gold certification in the US by the Recording Industry Association of America (RIAA), denoting shipments of 500,000 units.

"Señorita" is Justified's fourth single, released through rhythmic radio on July 8, 2003. It was written by Timberlake and The Neptunes, while being produced by the latter. It reached number 27 on the Hot 100, and achieved its highest peak in Australia and New Zealand, where it reached number six and four, respectively.

== Promotion ==
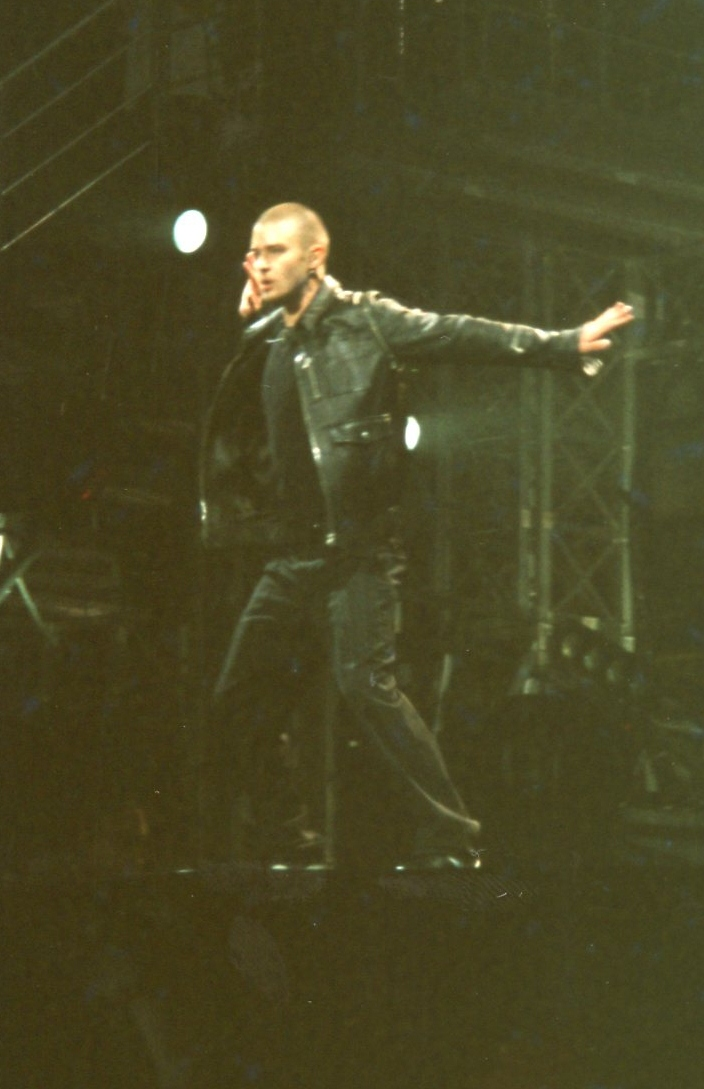
Timberlake performing during the Justified World Tour at the Earls Court Exhibition Centre, August 2003

Timberlake performed "Like I Love You" at the 2002 MTV Video Music Awards prior to the album's release. The day of Justified's release, Timberlake appeared on TRL and performed "Like I Love You" and "Cry Me a River" live in Times Square. TV specials included a sit-down interview with Barbara Walters on 20/20, an episode of MTV Launch that followed the making of Justified, and the TV concert special, Justin Timberlake: Down Home in Memphis. Timberlake performed "Cry Me a River" at the 13th annual Billboard Music Awards, held on December 9, 2002, at the MGM Grand Garden Arena in Las Vegas. He was accompanied by a string section and a 20-member choir. He performed "Cry Me a River" on a promotional concert held at House of Blues in West Hollywood, California on June 17, 2003. On February 1, 2004, the singer performed "Rock Your Body" at the Super Bowl XXXVIII halftime show with singer Janet Jackson. At the moment Timberlake sang the lyric "Bet I'll have you naked by the end of this song," he ripped off part of Jackson's costume, momentarily exposing her right breast on live television. Timberlake distanced himself from the controversy while Jackson faced much criticism. He later commented that "America's harsher on women". He performed "Señorita" live on the sketch comedy show Saturday Night Live in October 2003, where he served as host and musical guest, and at the 2004 Grammy Awards. Magazine covers included Rolling Stone, which dubbed him the "New King of Pop", Entertainment Weekly, Vibe magazine, The Advocate, and Details.

Timberlake did a joint tour in North America with Christina Aguilera entitled the Justified & Stripped Tour, to support both Justified and Aguilera's 2002 album, Stripped. Timberlake's and Aguilera's managers suggested to both singers to go on a conjoint tour. Timberlake agreed with the suggestion, saying that "It would be fun to be on tour with somebody who's that talented". Timberlake's further reasoning for touring with Aguilera was due to both singers wanting to "break the mold of what people look at as teen pop and move into a different direction". For the tour, Timberlake wanted to transform arenas into clubs, stating that he wants people "to feel like they're a part of the show and it's a party", remarking that anybody caught sitting down would get booted. For the tour, Timberlake performed with eight dancers, a 14-piece band which included four backup singers, three horn players and a DJ. The tour commenced on June 4, 2003, in Phoenix, Arizona and concluded on September 2, 2003, in Saint Paul, Minnesota. The tour grossed approximately $45 million.

In September 2003, McDonald's announced Timberlake as a new spokesmen for their "I'm Lovin' It" campaign. Timberlake recorded "I'm Lovin' It", to be featured in adverts for the franchise, later expanded and released as a single in December 2003. McDonald's later announced they will sponsor a tour for Timberlake, following his successful North American tour with Christina Aguilera, entitled the Justified World Tour. Timberlake stated "I love what McDonald's is doing with the new 'i'm lovin' it' campaign and it's cool to be part of it [...] We share the same crowd – people who like to have fun – and that's what this new partnership and my European concert tour is all about." The tour began with Timberlake playing intimate gigs at clubs and theaters in the United States and Australia before expanding to arenas in Europe. The tour commenced on May 7, 2003, in Sheffield, England and concluded on June 19, 2004, in Brisbane, Australia. Jive Records released two DVD specials for Justified, Justified: The Videos and Justin Timberlake: Live from London.

== Critical reception ==
Professional ratings
Aggregate scores
| Source | Rating |
|---|---|
| Metacritic | 68/100 |
Review scores
| Source | Rating |
| AllMusic | 3.5/5 stars |
| Blender | 3/5 stars |
| Entertainment Weekly | B |
| The Guardian | 2/5 stars |
| The New Zealand Herald | 4/5 stars |
| NME | 3/5 stars |
| Pitchfork | 8.0/10 |
| Rolling Stone | 4/5 stars |
| The Rolling Stone Album Guide | 4/5 stars |
| Uncut | 4/5 stars |
| The Village Voice | A− |

Justified received generally positive reviews from critics. At Metacritic, which assigns a normalized rating out of 100 to reviews from mainstream publications, the album has received an average score of 68, based on 14 reviews. Ben Ratliff of Rolling Stone was receptive to The Neptunes's production, and highlighted both "Like I Love You" and "Cry Me a River" as standout tracks. Ratliff also commented that Justin Timberlake had successfully "vaulted over the canyon" to adulthood. Slant Magazine critic Sal Cinquemani believed that Timberlake meshed with The Neptunes "so well he virtually relinquishes his personality to the super-duo—he could very well be the third member of N.E.R.D." Cinquemani noted the similarities between Justified's tracks to the work of musician Michael Jackson, saying that the album should have been Jackson's tenth and final studio album, Invincible (2001). BBC Music's Denise Boyd praised "Like I Love You", while also commending "Cry Me a River" for its lyrical content and "Rock Your Body", which he notes contains Michael Jackson and Stevie Wonder influences. In Entertainment Weekly, David Browne wrote how the album should have been the outcome of Jackson's tenth studio album, as "the ultramodern R&B-pop hybrid". Browne described Justified as "cohesive", favoring the album over NSYNC's previous two efforts: Celebrity (2001) and No Strings Attached (2000).

New York Post critic Dan Aquilante praised Timberlake's departure from NSYNC's pop sound, describing his embrace of "classic, hurts-so-good American R&B and modern hip-hop" as a "smart departure." He also credited Timberlake with showing "real promise as a composer" through his songwriting, although he criticized the album’s ballads as weaker than its more rhythm-driven material. Robert Christgau wrote of Timberlake in The Village Voice, "though his talent and character were there for all to see, who knew he'd turn out this heady or beatwise?" The newspaper's Christopher O'Connor commended The Neptunes' production, while praising "Like I Love You" and the Janet Jackson collaboration "(And She Said) Take Me Now", saying how the songs show that Timberlake "has the balls to pursue the A-plus list." O'Connor showed ambivalence towards "Right for Me" and "Cry Me a River", noting the former as "awkward" and the latter as "a lousy Aaliyah impression". Tyler Martin from Stylus Magazine deemed "Señorita" and "Like I Love You" as the record's highlights, while writing that the album does not maintain Timberlake's masculine persona, but still "paints a picture of a complicated young man, growing into adulthood".

NME's Alex Needham was less enthusiastic, writing that Timberlake's lyrics are "soppy platitudes that may or may not be about Britney". Caroline Sullivan of The Guardian believed the only noticeable tracks are "Cry Me a River" and "Rock Your Body", noting the latter as "predictable", while criticizing the album's lyrics as being "suggestive mumbling". Some critics accused Timberlake of borrowing inspiration too heavily from Michael Jackson's work. AllMusic's Stephen Thomas Erlewine commented that Timberlake "shamelessly borrows from Jacko, from the Thriller-era", going on to criticize his vocals as to lack substance, with his falsetto lacking character, though calling him a "technically skilled vocalist".

=== Accolades ===
Justified was ranked second on The Face's "Recordings of the Year", and 46 on Village Voice's "Pazz + Jop 2003". Justified was listed at number 37 on The A.V. Club's Best music of the decade list. The album was also included in the book 1001 Albums You Must Hear Before You Die. It was also included on The Guardian's list of "1000 albums to hear before you die", calling the artist "the quintessential modern crossover act". In 2009 MTV Base included the album among the 100 "Greatest Albums Ever", which ranked 15 after the public poll. In 2014, writers from Paste considered it the 7th best solo debut, and in 2017 from Cleveland.com, the best boy band solo debut. Justified ranked 5 on NME's greatest debut albums turning 15 in 2017, with the author saying "perhaps a few more listens would have changed NME's mind at the time." In 2019, The Guardian ranked it number 87 in their list of "The 100 best albums of the 21st century", saying: "Timberlake's Neptunes/Timbaland-helmed debut was slick, sexy and most importantly, convincing."

== Awards ==
Justified earned Timberlake three American Music Award nominations, including Favorite Pop/Rock Album, Favorite Pop/Rock Male Artist and Fan Choice Award. Timberlake won the award for Favorite Pop/Rock Album. At the 45th Grammy Awards, Timberlake had one nomination for Best Rap/Sung Collaboration for "Like I Love You". The following year, Justified earned Timberlake nominations for Album of the Year and Best Pop Vocal Album, while "Cry Me a River" was nominated for Best Male Pop Vocal Performance. Timberlake won the latter two awards. For Justified, Timberlake won Best Male, Best Pop and Best Album at the 2003 MTV Europe Music Awards. Justified won the International Album award at the 2004 Brit Awards.

At the 2003 BET Awards, he received two nominations for Best R&B Male Artist and Best New Artist. Among others, it was nominated Best Album at the MOBO Award, International Album of the Year at the NRJ Music Awards, and Foreign Album of the Year at the Danish Music Awards.

== Legacy ==
For a 2018 Billboard article, writers Taylor Weatherby and Nina Braca said the album "may possibly be the most iconic debut album from a former band member in pop music history", describing it as "[a] bona-fide success that foreshadowed Timberlake's superstardom to come" and "at the same time, a declaration of independence from his poppier beginnings." From the same magazine, Dan Weiss deemed Justified as Timberlake's "classic album". Writers from Consequence of Sound deemed it "the standard for former teen pop stars' bids to be taken seriously" when comparing it to other debut solo albums released later, and Herald Sun considered it a "boy band to men blueprint". British singer-songwriter Ed Sheeran cited the album as an inspiration for his 2014 single "Sing", and Shawn Mendes for his 2018 song "Lost in Japan". One Direction's Liam Payne, talking about his debut solo album LP1, stated he was focusing on making a record like Justified.

== Commercial performance ==
Justified debuted at number two on the Billboard 200, selling 439,000 copies in its opening week. The album was expected to top the chart, replacing the 8 Mile soundtrack (2002). Instead the soundtrack sold 507,000 copies, due to being propelled by Eminem's "Lose Yourself". The following week, Justified sold 188,770 copies and fell two positions to number four. In its third week, the album sold 110,000 copies and remained within the top ten on the chart. The album appeared on the Billboard 200 chart for seventy-two weeks, and eventually went on to sell 3.5 million copies in the US. It has been certified three times platinum by the Recording Industry Association of America (RIAA), for shipments of three million copies. As of 2018, the album has accumuladed 4.6 million album-equivalent units in the US, combining sales and equivalent streams. Justified debuted and peaked at number two on the US Top R&B/Hip-Hop Albums chart. The album charted on the Billboard 200 and Top R&B/Hip-Hop Albums 2003 year-end charts, reaching number eleven and twenty-six, respectively.

Internationally, Justified received a similar response. In the United Kingdom, Justified debuted at number six on the week of November 16, 2002, and eventually peaked at number one, remaining atop for seven non-consecutive weeks. The album has appeared on the chart for 84 weeks; it has been certified seven times platinum by the British Phonographic Industry (BPI) for shipments of 2.1 million copies. As of March 2015, Justified is the 41st best-selling album of the millennium in the United Kingdom. In Canada, the album peaked at number three and has been certified two times platinum by Music Canada. Justified debuted and peaked at number four in Denmark and the Netherlands, remaining on the charts for forty and seventy-two weeks, respectively. The album peaked at number five in New Zealand for one week, appearing on the chart for thirty-six weeks, and receiving a two times platinum certification by the Recording Industry Association of New Zealand (RIANZ) for shipping 15,000 units. Justified peaked in the top ten in Belgium, Australia and Norway. The album charted within the top thirty and forty in several other countries. As of June 2012, the album has sold over 10 million copies worldwide.

In 2003, Justified was ranked as the 11th most popular album of the year on the Billboard 200. According to Billboard, as of 2022, Justified is one of the 15 best-performing 21st-century albums without any of its singles being number-one hits on the Billboard Hot 100.

== Track listing ==
Justified track listing
| No. | Title | Writer(s) | Producer(s) | Length |
|---|---|---|---|---|
| 1. | "Señorita" | Justin Timberlake; Chad Hugo; Pharrell Williams | The Neptunes | 4:54 |
| 2. | "Like I Love You" (featuring Clipse) | Timberlake; Hugo; Williams; Gene Thornton; Terrence Thornton | The Neptunes | 4:43 |
| 3. | "(Oh No) What You Got" | Timberlake; Timothy Mosley; Scott Storch | Timbaland | 4:31 |
| 4. | "Take It from Here" | Timberlake; Hugo; Williams | The Neptunes | 6:14 |
| 5. | "Cry Me a River" | Timberlake; Mosley; Storch | Timbaland | 4:48 |
| 6. | "Rock Your Body" | Timberlake; Hugo; Williams | The Neptunes | 4:27 |
| 7. | "Nothin' Else" | Timberlake; Hugo; Williams | The Neptunes | 4:58 |
| 8. | "Last Night" | Timberlake; Hugo; Williams | The Neptunes | 4:47 |
| 9. | "Still on My Brain" | Timberlake; Harvey Mason, Jr.; Damon Thomas | The Underdogs | 4:35 |
| 10. | "(And She Said) Take Me Now" (featuring Janet Jackson) | Timberlake; Mosley; Storch | Timbaland | 5:31 |
| 11. | "Right for Me" (featuring Bubba Sparxxx) | Timberlake; Mathis; Mosley; Storch | Timbaland | 4:29 |
| 12. | "Let's Take a Ride" | Timberlake; Hugo; Williams | The Neptunes | 4:44 |
| 13. | "Never Again" | Timberlake; Brian McKnight | McKnight | 4:34 |
| Total length: | | | | 63:15 |

UK, Australian and Japanese bonus track
| No. | Title | Writer(s) | Producer(s) | Length |
|---|---|---|---|---|
| 14. | "Worthy Of" | Timberlake; Carvin Haggins; Ivan Barias; Frank Romano; Valvin Roane | Ivan "Orthodox" Barias; Carvin "Ransum" Haggins | 4:09 |
| Total length: | | | | 67:24 |

Asian reissue hidden track
| No. | Title | Writer(s) | Producer(s) | Length |
|---|---|---|---|---|
| 14. | "Why, When, How" | Anthony Nance; Antonio Dixon; Timberlake | Dre & Vidal | 4:01 |
| Total length: | | | | 67:16 |

The Videos (VCD/DVD)
| No. | Title | Director(s) | Length |
|---|---|---|---|
| 1. | "Like I Love You" (featuring Clipse) | Diane Martel | 4:45 |
| 2. | "Like I Love You (MTV's Making the Video – Excerpts)" | Martel | 9:55 |
| 3. | "Cry Me a River" | Francis Lawrence | 4:48 |
| 4. | "Like I Love You (2002 MTV Video Music Awards Performance)" | Beth McCarthy-Miller | 4:39 |
| 5. | "Like I Love You (MTV's TRL Live in Times Square Performance)" | Joe DeMaio | 3:57 |
| 6. | "Cry Me a River (MTV's TRL Live in Times Square Performance)" | DeMaio | 4:06 |
| 7. | "Rock Your Body" | Lawrence | 5:04 |
| 8. | "Rock Your Body (MTV's Making the Video – Excerpts)" | Lawrence | 10:09 |
| 9. | "Señorita" | Paul Hunter | 4:36 |
| 10. | "MTV's Launch – Excerpts" | Paul Carruthers | 10:00 |
| 11. | "2003 Brit Awards Performance" | Guy Freeman | 4:59 |
| 12. | "I'm Lovin' It" (bonus track) | Hunter | 3:48 |
| Total length: | | | 70:46 |

Notes

- ^{^[a]} signifies a co-producer
- "Señorita" features additional vocals by Pharrell Williams.
- "Like I Love You" features a rap performed by Clipse.
- "Right for Me" features a rap performed by Bubba Sparxxx and additional vocals by Timbaland.

== Personnel ==
Credits for Justified adapted from AllMusic and album's liner notes.

=== Musicians ===
- Lainie Aguilar – background vocals (track 1)
- Marsha Ambrosius – background vocals (track 5)
- Damon Bennett – flute (track 11)
- Clipse (Pusha T and Malice) – rap (track 2)
- Vidal Davis – percussion (track 11)
- Nathan East – bass (track 9)
- Omar Edwards – keyboards (track 11)
- Prescott Ellison – drums (track 13)
- Larry Gold – conductor and string arrangements (tracks 5, 10, 11)
- Chad Hugo – instruments (tracks 1, 2, 4, 6–8, 12)
- Janet Jackson – additional vocals (track 10)
- Ben Kenney – guitar (track 11)
- Vanessa Marquez – additional vocals (track 6)
- Harvey Mason, Jr. – music (track 9)
- George "Spanky" McCurdy – drums (track 11)
- Brian McKnight – instruments and vocal arrangements (track 13)
- Bill Meyers – conductor and string arrangements (track 13)
- Bill Pettaway – guitar (track 5)
- Bubba Sparxxx – rap (track 11)
- Scott Storch – clavinet (tracks 5, 10)
- Damon Thomas – music (track 9)
- Timbaland – background vocals (tracks 3, 5, 10, 11)
- Justin Timberlake – lead vocals, background vocals, vocal arrangements
- Thaddeus Tribbett – bass (track 11)
- Tye Tribbett & G.A. – background vocals (track 5)
- Charles Veal & The Southwest Chamber Orchestra – strings (tracks 4, 8)
- Frank "Knuckles" Walker – percussion (track 11)
- Pharrell Williams – instruments and vocal arrangements (tracks 1, 2, 4, 6–8, 12), additional vocals (1, 2, 8)
- Benjamin Wright – conductor and string arrangements (tracks 4, 8)

=== Production ===
- Produced by The Neptunes (tracks 1, 2, 4, 6–8, 12), Timbaland (3, 5, 10, 11), The Underdogs (Damon Thomas & Harvey Mason, Jr.) (9), Brian McKnight (13)
- Co-produced by Scott Storch (track 10)
- Recorded by Andrew Coleman (tracks 1, 2, 4, 6–8, 12), Steve Penny (3), Jimmy Douglass (5, 10, 11), Dave "Natural Love" Russell and Dabling Harward (9), Chris Wood (13)
- Mixed by Serban Ghenea (tracks 1, 2, 4, 6–8, 12), Jimmy Douglass and Timbaland (3, 5, 10, 11), Dave "Natural Love" Russell (9), Dave "Hard Drive" Pensado (13)
- Assistant engineers: Daniel Betancourt and Tim Roberts (tracks 1, 2, 4, 6–8, 12); "Steamy" (3, 5, 10, 11); Carlos "Storm" Martinez (5, 10, 11); Mary Ann Souza, Joe Brown, and Ethan Willoughby (13)
- Strings recorded by Tommy Vicari (track 13)
- Pro Tools engineer: Jimmy Randolph (track 13)
- Additional Pro Tools engineering by John Hanes (tracks 1, 2, 4, 6–8, 12)
- Additional vocals recorded by Eddie Delena (track 6)
- Mastered by Herb Powers Jr. at The Hit Factory for PM Entertainment
- A&R Direction: Silas White
- Photographer: Steven Klein
- Creative director: David Lipman
- Producer: Gabriel Ray Sanchez
- Stylist: Arianne Phillips
- Hair: Jimmy Paul
- Makeup: Carla White
- Set design: Marla Weinhoff

== Charts ==
=== Weekly charts ===
Weekly chart performance for Justified
| Chart (2002–03) | Peak position |
|---|---|
| Australian Albums (ARIA) | 9 |
| Australian Urban Albums (ARIA) | 1 |
| Austrian Albums (Ö3 Austria) | 33 |
| Belgian Albums (Ultratop Flanders) | 10 |
| Belgian Albums (Ultratop Wallonia) | 8 |
| Canadian Albums (Billboard) | 3 |
| Canadian R&B Albums (Nielsen SoundScan) | 5 |
| Danish Albums (Hitlisten) | 4 |
| Dutch Albums (Album Top 100) | 4 |
| European Albums (Top 100) | 3 |
| Finnish Albums (Suomen virallinen lista) | 7 |
| French Albums (SNEP) | 30 |
| German Albums (Offizielle Top 100) | 11 |
| Hungarian Albums (MAHASZ) | 36 |
| Icelandic Albums (Tónlist) | 25 |
| Irish Albums (IRMA) | 1 |
| Italian Albums (FIMI) | 22 |
| New Zealand Albums (RMNZ) | 5 |
| Norwegian Albums (VG-lista) | 9 |
| Scottish Albums (Official Charts) | 1 |
| Swedish Albums (Sverigetopplistan) | 21 |
| Swiss Albums (Schweizer Hitparade) | 22 |
| UK Albums (Official Charts) | 1 |
| UK Independent Albums (Official Charts) | 1 |
| UK R&B Albums (Official Charts) | 1 |
| US Billboard 200 | 2 |
| US Top R&B/Hip-Hop Albums (Billboard) | 2 |

=== Year-end charts ===
2002 year-end chart performance for Justified
| Chart (2002) | Position |
|---|---|
| Canadian Albums (Nielsen SoundScan) | 58 |
| Canadian R&B Albums (Nielsen SoundScan) | 10 |
| UK Albums (OCC) | 93 |
| US Billboard 200 | 119 |

2003 year-end chart performance for Justified
| Chart (2003) | Position |
|---|---|
| Australian Albums (ARIA) | 20 |
| Belgian Albums (Ultratop Flanders) | 21 |
| Belgian Albums (Ultratop Wallonia) | 30 |
| Dutch Albums (Album Top 100) | 10 |
| French Albums (SNEP) | 97 |
| German Albums (Offizielle Top 100) | 29 |
| Irish Albums (IRMA) | 3 |
| New Zealand Albums (RMNZ) | 12 |
| Swedish Albums (Sverigetopplistan) | 54 |
| Swiss Albums (Schweizer Hitparade) | 31 |
| UK Albums (OCC) | 2 |
| US Billboard 200 | 11 |
| US Top R&B/Hip-Hop Albums (Billboard) | 26 |
| Worldwide Albums (IFPI) | 19 |

=== Decade-end charts ===
2000s-end chart performance for Justified
| Chart (2000–09) | Position |
|---|---|
| UK Albums (OCC) | 31 |

== Certifications and sales ==
Certifications and sales for Justified
| Region | Certification | Certified units/sales |
|---|---|---|
| Australia (ARIA) | 3× Platinum | 210,000^{^} |
| Austria (IFPI Austria) | Gold | 15,000^{*} |
| Belgium (BRMA) | Gold | 25,000^{*} |
| Brazil | — | 25,000 |
| Canada (Music Canada) | 2× Platinum | 200,000^{^} |
| Denmark (IFPI Danmark) | 5× Platinum | 100,000^{‡} |
| France (SNEP) | Gold | 100,000^{*} |
| Germany (BVMI) | Platinum | 300,000^{^} |
| Netherlands (NVPI) | 2× Platinum | 160,000^{^} |
| New Zealand (RMNZ) | 2× Platinum | 30,000^{‡} |
| South Korea | — | 41,195 |
| Sweden (GLF) | Gold | 30,000^{^} |
| Switzerland (IFPI Switzerland) | Platinum | 40,000^{^} |
| United Kingdom (BPI) | 7× Platinum | 2,100,000 |
| United States (RIAA) | 3× Platinum | 3,969,000 |
Summaries
| Europe (IFPI) | Platinum | 1,000,000^{*} |
| Worldwide | — | 10,000,000 |
^{*} Sales figures based on certification alone.^{^} Shipments figures based on certification alone.^{‡} Sales+streaming figures based on certification alone.

== Release history ==
Release dates for Justified
| Country | Date | Format | Label | Ref. |
|---|---|---|---|---|
| United Kingdom | November 4, 2002 | CD | RCA | |
| Canada | November 5, 2002 | CD | Sony | |
| United States | November 5, 2002 | CD | Jive | |
| Japan | November 7, 2002 | CD | Sony | |
| Australia | November 11, 2002 | CD | Sony | |
| United States | November 19, 2002 | LP | Jive | |
| United Kingdom | December 2, 2002 | LP | RCA | |
| Canada | April 16, 2013 | LP | Sony | |

== See also ==
- List of UK Albums Chart number ones of the 2000s
- List of number-one albums of 2003 (Ireland)
