= Justifier =

Justifier may refer to:

- Something which justifies
  - In the theory of justification, something which justifies a belief
- The Justifier, a light gun peripheral manufactured by Konami for various game consoles
- "Justifier", a song by Australian pop/rock band Big Pig
- Justifier, fictional flying ship in the Marvel Comics universe, used by vigilante team The Jury
- Justifier, an alternate Dungeons & Dragons character class
- Justifiers RPG, a tabletop role-playing game
