= Rock Your Body =

2003 single by Justin Timberlake

Single by Justin Timberlake

from the album Justified
- B-side: "Worthy Of"
- Released: March 17, 2003
- Recorded: 2002
- Studio: Master Sound: Windmark (Virginia Beach, Virginia)
- Genre: Disco; R&B; soul
- Length: 4:27
- Label: Jive
- Songwriters: Justin Timberlake; Pharrell Williams; Chad Hugo
- Producer: The Neptunes

Justin Timberlake singles chronology
"Work It" (2003)	"Rock Your Body" (2003)	"Señorita" (2003)

Music video
- "Rock Your Body" on YouTube

"Rock Your Body" is a song by American singer Justin Timberlake from his debut studio album, Justified (2002). The Neptunes (consisting of Chad Hugo and Pharrell Williams) wrote and produced the song. The song features background vocals by American singer Vanessa Marquez, who was signed to the Neptunes' Star Trak record label at the time. Jive Records released the track on March 17, 2003, as the third single from Justified. Originally intended to be featured on Michael Jackson's tenth studio album Invincible (2001), Jackson rejected the song along with several other tracks, which were instead given to Timberlake for his debut album. It is an uptempo, disco groove, soul infused song containing influences from Jackson and Stevie Wonder.

"Rock Your Body" received generally positive reviews from music critics, who noted it as a stand-out track, while complimenting its musical elements. The song topped the Australian Singles Chart. It peaked at number two on the UK Singles Chart and became the third single from Justified to do so, following "Like I Love You" and "Cry Me a River". It also charted at number five on the US Billboard Hot 100. It was certified gold by the Recording Industry Association of America (RIAA) and double platinum by the British Phonographic Industry (BPI) for sales of 500,000 and 1,200,000 copies, respectively.

The accompanying music video, directed by Francis Lawrence, features Timberlake with several back-up dancers performing choreography within a multi-colored lighted cube. Timberlake performed "Rock Your Body" live several times, including the highly controversial performance at the 2004 Super Bowl XXXVIII halftime show with R&B singer Janet Jackson, referred to as a "wardrobe malfunction".

== Writing and recording ==
"Rock Your Body" was written by Justin Timberlake and its producers, Chad Hugo and Pharrell Williams. It was recorded at Master Sound Recording Studios and Windmark Recording, both located in Virginia Beach with Andrew Coleman serving as a recording engineer. It was mixed by Serban Ghenea at Windmark Recording, with Daniel Botancourt and Tim Roberts aiding as additional engineers. John Hanes provided additional Pro Tools engineering. All the instrumentation was delivered by Hugo and Williams, with vocal arrangements handled by the latter and Timberlake. Vanessa Marquez provided additional vocals, which were recorded by Eddie Delena at the Record Plant located in Los Angeles. "Rock Your Body" was initially given to Michael Jackson for his tenth and final studio album Invincible (2001), along with several other songs by the Neptunes. Jackson did not want any of the tracks, and so all the material was passed onto Timberlake for his debut album, Justified.

== Composition and reception ==
"Rock Your Body"
"Rock Your Body" is an uptempo, disco groove, soul infused track. It has been compared to the discographies of Michael Jackson and Stevie Wonder.

"Rock Your Body" runs for four minutes and twenty-seven seconds. The uptempo R&B, disco groove, soul infused song contains influences from both Michael Jackson and Stevie Wonder. The song incorporates tinny, "keyboard-set-to-emulate-clavichord" synthesizers of the Neptunes' late 90s productions, overlaid with "keys and a propulsive drum vamp". Timberlake makes use of his falsetto range, and Vanessa Marquez sings the female section. Alex Needham of NME noted the track to contain characteristics from material within Jackson's album Off the Wall (1979).

According to the sheet music published at Musicnotes.com by Sony/ATV Music Publishing, "Rock Your Body" is written in the key of E minor and has a tempo of 101 beats per minute. It follows the chord progression of F/G-G/A-Em, with Justin Timberlake's vocal range spanning from the low note of B_{3} to the high note of D_{6}. Andy Kellman of AllMusic noted "Rock Your Body" as a stand-out from Justified, as did Jane Stevenson of Jam!, who interpreted its Jackson influence. Giving Justified a negative review, Caroline Sullivan of The Guardian noted "Rock Your Body" as "predictable". Complex's Tannis Spenser listed the song as the fifth best Justin Timberlake song, praising its "near perfect sing along chorus" and Timberlake's vocals.

Pitchfork Media listed the song at 23 on their list of the best singles of 2003, with editor Dominique Leone writing "Rock Your Body" is "as fine an approximation of Off the Wall-era MJ as I've ever heard. The pleading falsetto is right on time, immediately preceded by tough talk about grabbing your girl (and a "couple more")-- the drama!"

== Commercial performance ==
On the week of March 22, 2003, "Rock Your Body" debuted on the US Billboard Hot 100 at number 61, earning the Hot Shot Debut honor. The following week, the song entered the top 40 at number 37, and in its third week, reached number 28. In its fourth week, the song charted at number 20 on the Hot 100, and in its fifth week, rose further to number 13. Within its sixth week, it moved up two positions to number 11, and reached number 10 the following week. "Rock Your Body" eventually reached its peak at number five, where it remained for one week. The song remained on the Hot 100 for 22 weeks before dropping out. The song topped the US Mainstream Top 40 chart, where it remained for one week. It was less successful on the US Hot R&B/Hip-Hop Songs chart, where it peaked at number 45. On February 5, 2005, the song was certified gold by the Recording Industry Association of America (RIAA), for shipments of 500,000 copies. As of 2018, the song has sold 2 million copies in the country.

Internationally, the song was met with a similar response. "Rock Your Body" debuted on the Australian Singles Chart at number one. It dropped to number three the following week, where it remained in the top ten for six weeks; it stayed on the chart for eleven weeks before dropping out. The song was certified platinum by the Australian Recording Industry Association (ARIA), denoting shipments of 70,000 copies. On the UK Singles Chart, "Rock Your Body" became Timberlake's third consecutive number two hit, following "Like I Love You" and "Cry Me a River". On the New Zealand Singles Chart, "Rock Your Body" achieved its peak on the week of June 22, 2003, its second week on the chart, at number four. The song remained on the chart for 20 weeks, and was later certified triple platinum by Recorded Music NZ (RMNZ), for 90,000 equivalent units.

It charted within the top five on the Danish Singles Chart and Irish Singles Chart, peaking at number three and four, respectively. It peaked at number six on Belgian Singles Chart (Flanders), Finnish Singles Chart and Dutch Singles Chart. "Rock Your Body" was less successful in other territories. It charted within the top 20 on the Belgian Singles Chart (Wallonia), French Singles Chart, Swedish Singles Charts and Norwegian Singles Chart. It charted outside the top 20 on the German Singles Chart, Swiss Singles Chart and Austrian Singles Chart; the latter chart is the song's lowest charting territory, where it peaked at number 56.

== Music video ==
Timberlake dancing inside a cube surrounded by an array of colored light

The music video was directed by Francis Lawrence and filmed on February 4–5, 2003, on Stage 5 at Ren-Mar Studios. It opens within a black cube with an array of different colored lights with several people dancing. The video intercuts to Justin Timberlake singing the song. Timberlake then floats to the floor from an opening in the cube's ceiling, performing choreography with his supporting dancers and singing to the track's first verse. Throughout the video, it intercuts to Timberlake dancing by himself, with the sections sometimes featuring the camera panning around Timberlake's face. Entering the second verse, Timberlake is in the cube on his own, manipulating the motion of the cube with his hands, with his legs following the moving platform. Timberlake then returns, performing choreography again with his dancers.

Following the second chorus, Timberlake dances with Staci Flood, who lip syncs Vanessa Marquez's section. Timberlake is seen beatboxing. The video ends with Timberlake's duplicates dancing.

== Live performances ==
Timberlake performed "Rock Your Body" during his Justified World Tour and the Christina Aguilera conjoint tour Justified & Stripped Tour, both in support of his debut album Justified. He performed the song live on the sketch comedy show Saturday Night Live in October 2003, where he served as host and musical guest. On February 1, 2004, Timberlake performed the song with pop singer Janet Jackson during her performance at the Super Bowl XXXVIII halftime show. At the moment he sang the lyric "Bet I'll have you naked by the end of this song", he ripped off part of Jackson's outfit, momentarily exposing her right breast on live television. Timberlake distanced himself from the controversy while Jackson faced much criticism and backlash. He later commented that "America's harsher on women ... [and] unfairly harsh on ethnic people." Timberlake performed the song at the Hollywood Palladium, following his performance at the 55th Annual Grammy Awards on February 10, 2013. He performed "Rock Your Body" in a medley with other of his songs at the 2013 MTV Video Music Awards. In 2016, he performed the song along with "Can't Stop the Feeling!" during the interval act of the Eurovision Song Contest 2016 grand finale.

"Rock Your Body" was also featured in the set lists of FutureSex/LoveShow (2007), Legends of the Summer Stadium Tour with rapper Jay-Z (2013), The 20/20 Experience World Tour (2013–2015), The Man of the Woods Tour (2018–2019), and The Forget Tomorrow World Tour (2024–2025). He again performed the song during the Super Bowl LII halftime show in 2018, this time abruptly stopping the "have you naked..." line and, after a brief pause, segueing into another song.

== Personnel ==
Credits are adapted from AllMusic and the Justified inlay.

- David Betancourt – assistant engineer
- Andrew Coleman – engineer
- Eddie DeLena – vocal engineer
- Serban Ghenea – mixing
- Ian Green – engineer, programming
- Chaz Harpe – mastering
- Chad Hugo – instrumentation, producer
- Eelke Kalberg – producer
- Sander Kleinenberg – producer, remixing
- Sebastiaan Molijn – producer
- Paul Oakenfold – remixing
- Herb Powers – mastering
- Tim Roberts – assistant engineer
- Justin Timberlake – primary artist, vocal arrangement, vocals
- Pharrell Williams – instrumentation, producer, vocal arrangement, vocals
- Vanessa Marquez – additional vocals

== Charts ==
=== Weekly charts ===
2003 weekly chart performance for "Rock Your Body"
Chart (2003)	Peak position
Australia (ARIA)	1
Australian Club Chart (ARIA)	3
Australian Dance (ARIA)	1
Australian Urban (ARIA)	2
Austria (Ö3 Austria Top 40)	56
Belgium (Ultratop 50 Flanders)	6
Belgium Dance (Ultratop Flanders)	6
Belgium (Ultratop 50 Wallonia)	14
Belgium Dance (Ultratop Wallonia)	6
Canada (Nielsen SoundScan)	31
Canada CHR (Nielsen BDS)	1
Croatia International Airplay (HRT)	3
Denmark (Tracklisten)	3
Europe (Eurochart Hot 100)	2
Finland (Suomen virallinen lista)	6
France (SNEP)	15
Germany (GfK)	25
Hungary (Rádiós Top 40)	31
Hungary (Dance Top 40)	37
Ireland (IRMA)	4
Italy (FIMI)	21
Netherlands (Dutch Top 40)	2
Netherlands (Single Top 100)	6
New Zealand (Recorded Music NZ)	4
Norway (VG-lista)	17
Romania (Romanian Top 100)	6
Scottish Singles Sales (Official Charts)	2
Sweden (Sverigetopplistan)	15
Switzerland (Schweizer Hitparade)	34
UK Singles (Official Charts)	2
UK Airplay (Music Week)	1
UK Dance (Official Charts)	1
UK Independent (Official Charts)	2
US Billboard Hot 100	5
US Adult Pop Airplay (Billboard)	24
US Dance Club Songs (Billboard) Remixes	1
US Dance Airplay (Billboard)	3
US Hot R&B/Hip-Hop Songs (Billboard)	45
US Pop Airplay (Billboard)	1
US Rhythmic Airplay (Billboard)	7

2013 weekly chart performance for "Rock Your Body"
Chart (2013)	Peak position
Canada (Nielsen SoundScan)	26

=== Year-end charts ===
Year-end chart performance for "Rock Your Body"
Chart (2003)	Position
Australia (ARIA)	46
Australian Club Chart (ARIA)	35
Australian Dance (ARIA)	19
Belgium (Ultratop 50 Flanders)	54
Belgium Dance (Ultratop Flanders)	44
Belgium (Ultratop 50 Wallonia)	82
Belgium Dance (Ultratop Wallonia)	44
Ireland (IRMA)	50
Netherlands (Dutch Top 40)	25
Netherlands (Single Top 100)	62
New Zealand (RIANZ)	19
UK Singles (OCC)	55
UK Airplay (Music Week)	2
US Billboard Hot 100	32
US Adult Top 40 (Billboard)	57
US Dance Club Play (Billboard)	8
US Mainstream Top 40 (Billboard)	5
US Rhythmic Top 40 (Billboard)	29

Chart (2004)	Position
UK Airplay (Music Week)	62

== Certifications ==
Certifications and sales for "Rock Your Body"
Region	Certification	Certified units/sales
Australia (ARIA)	2× Platinum	140,000^{‡}
Brazil (Pro-Música Brasil)	Gold	30,000^{‡}
Denmark (IFPI Danmark)	Platinum	90,000^{‡}
Germany (BVMI)	Gold	300,000^{‡}
Italy (FIMI)	Gold	50,000^{‡}
New Zealand (RMNZ)	4× Platinum	120,000^{‡}
United Kingdom (BPI)	2× Platinum	1,200,000^{‡}
United States (RIAA)	Gold	2,000,000
^{‡} Sales+streaming figures based on certification alone.

== Release history ==
Release dates and formats for "Rock Your Body"
Region	Date	Format(s)	Label(s)	Ref.
United States	March 17, 2003	Contemporary hit radio; rhythmic contemporary radio	Jive	
United States	April 7, 2003	Urban contemporary radio	Jive	
Australia	May 5, 2003	CD	Jive	
Japan	May 6, 2003	Maxi-CD	Jive	
Germany	May 19, 2003	Maxi-CD	Jive	
United Kingdom	May 19, 2003	12-inch vinyl; CD; cassette	Jive	

== Cover versions and appearances in other media ==
- The song was briefly featured in the 2005 ninth season South Park episode "Marjorine".
- This song is part of the soundtrack of Just Dance 2022, introducing the recurring character of the Traveler, a powerful dimension-hopping sorcerer said to be inspired by the Marvel Cinematic Universe's take on Doctor Stephen Strange (Benedict Cumberbatch). Together with Dua Lipa's "Levitating" and The Weeknd and Ariana Grande's "Save Your Tears (Remix)", it forms a trilogy of maps establishing the character's journey and eventual reunion with his previously-estranged love interest, goddess Si'ha Nova.

== See also ==
- Super Bowl XXXVIII halftime show controversy
- List of number-one singles of 2003 (Australia)
