= Justifiers RPG =

Tabletop science fiction role-playing game

Justifiers
- Cover art by Gideon
- Designers: Gideon; Blaine Pardoe
- Illustrators: Gideon
- Publishers: StarChilde
- Publication: 1988
- Genres: Science fiction

Justifiers RPG is a science fiction space adventure role-playing game published by StarChilde in 1988.

== Description ==
In Justifiers RPG, players take the role of "Beta Class" Humanoid Constructs, player characters who are part human, part animal. The characters are owned by a corporation, and must earn enough money to buy their freedom by going on space exploration missions.

When constructing the character, players can choose from 28 humanoid animal types, including bats, albatrosses, gila monsters, and rhinos. The game features a skill-based system in which character class dictates what skills a character has. Skill resolution is by the simple percentage-roll method; combat is likewise fairly streamlined. There are rules for psionic powers, cybernetic implants, weapons, and spaceships.

The game includes an introductory scenario.

== Publication history ==
Justifiers RPG was designed by Gideon, with Blaine Pardoe, and published by StarChilde in 1988 as a 128-page book with art by Gideon. Several sourcebooks and a second edition of the core rulebook followed.

After Justifiers RPG went out of print, German author Markus Heitz secured the rights to the Justifiers IP, and wrote a series of novels and short stories with other authors and created a new edition of the game.

== Reception ==
In Issue 88 of Space Gamer/Fantasy Gamer, Frank Roberts was not impressed by the skills resolution system, pointing out that the skills were only "loosely defined ... What the result actually means is left up totally to the poor gamemaster." Roberts concluded, "I think this is an excellent primer for beginning gamers. Its main focus is on small unit combat and inter-player conflict. This appears to be what most beginning gamers enjoy the most."

In Issue 45 of Abyss, Charles Hardin pointed out that "Like too many of these well-intentioned efforts, it does not offer sufficient advantages over its larger competitors to be worth while." Hardin also thought the background material was inadequate, noting "No map of the universe, no real flavor to the material, not even an introductory adventure for a beginning Gamemaster." Hardin also found problems with character generation ("seriously flawed") and the combat system ("simplistic"). Hardin concluded, "All in all, Justifiers does not fill any established niches in the RPG market and is too underdeveloped to break new ground effectively ... There is simply no reason to buy this game."

In his 1990 book The Complete Guide to Role-Playing Games, game critic Rick Swan was not impressed with the game, noting that character generation "produces acceptable results, but it's frustrating to use, because many of the rules are underdeveloped ... In fact, ambiguous rules and spotty writing plague Justifiers throughout." Swan also questioned the inclusion of weapons such as maces, tridents and short swords in a game set in the 23rd century. He concluded by giving the game a rating of only 2 out of 4, saying, "There are some good ideas here, but the game needs a rewrite."

Lawrence Schick commented that Justifiers "takes 'Pets in Space' to its farthest extreme", and that "If you can get by that, you'll find a solid skill-based system".

== Other reviews and commentary ==
- Reviews from R'lyeh 23 December 2018

== Justifiers publications ==
=== RPG books ===
- Justifiers RPG 1st Edition - 1988
- Justifiers RPG 2nd Edition - ISBN 9781878711007
- Aborigine Sourcebook
- The Corporate Sourcebook
- CyberMedTech Sourcebook
- The Hybrid Sourcebook - ISBN 9781878711151
- The Silent Corp Sourcebook
- Cold as Ice
- Out of the Mists - ISBN 9781878711038
- Poseidon - ISBN 9781878711045
- The Insidious Campaign - ISBN 9781878711069
- The Tower

=== Markus Heitz' Justifier series ===
==== Novels (in German) ====
- Justifiers - Collector - July 6, 2010 - ISBN 978-3453527386
- Justifiers - Collector: Operation Vade Retro - February 9, 2015 - ISBN 978-3453527393
- Christoph Hardebusch: Justifiers 1: Missing in Action
- Lena Falkenhagen: Justifiers 2: Undercover
- Thomas Finn: Justifiers 3: Mind Control
- Nicole Schuhmacher: Justifiers 4: Zero Gravity
- Boris Koch: Justifiers 5: Sabotage
- Daniela Knor: Justifiers 6: Outcast
- Thomas Plischke: Justifiers 7: Autopilot
- Maike Hallmann: Justifiers 8: Hard to kill - August 13, 2012 - ISBN 978-3453529380
- Christian von Aster: Justifiers 9: Robolution - December 10, 2012 - ISBN 978-3453529809
- Susan Schwartz: Justifiers 10: Unusual Suspects - March 11, 2013 - ISBN 978-3453314085

==== Graphic Novels (in German) ====
- Justifiers - Collector Band 2 - Automaton Prime - Markus Heitz, Hannes Radke, Jorg Krismann - January 14, 2014 - ISBN 978-3426653418
- Justifiers - Collector Band 3 - Die keeper - Markus Heitz, Hannes Radke, Jorg Krismann - January 1, 2018 - ISBN 978-3426653425

==== Roleplaying Books (in German) ====
- Markus Heitz' Justifiers - Das Abenteuerspiel (The Adventure Game) - December - ISBN 978-3868890716
- Markus Heitz' Justifiers - Mystery ISBN 978-3868891218
