= Señorita (Justin Timberlake song) =

2003 single by Justin Timberlake

Single by Justin Timberlake

from the album Justified
- Released: July 7, 2003
- Studio: Master Sound (Virginia Beach)
- Genre: R&B; pop; jazz
- Length: 4:54
- Label: Jive
- Songwriters: Justin Timberlake; Pharrell Williams; Chad Hugo
- Producer: The Neptunes

Justin Timberlake singles chronology
"Rock Your Body" (2003)	"Señorita" (2003)	"I'm Lovin' It" (2003)

Music video
- "Señorita" on YouTube

"Señorita" is a song by American singer Justin Timberlake from his debut solo album, Justified (2002). He wrote the song with its producers, Pharrell Williams and Chad Hugo of the Neptunes. Jive Records released it to US rhythmic contemporary and contemporary hit radio stations as the album's fourth and final single on July 7, 2003. "Señorita" is an up-tempo R&B, pop, and jazz ballad influenced by Stevie Wonder that features an electric piano strut, a cowbell chiming in the background, and a rhythm section. The song was described by music critics as a "Spanish number" with a "Latin-flavored" cut beat. In the track, Timberlake sings about a woman whose attention he is trying to capture.

"Señorita" received mostly positive reviews from music critics, who commented on its overall sound and lyrics. Commercially, the song reached the top ten in Australia and New Zealand, the top twenty in Belgium, Denmark, Ireland, and the United Kingdom, and the top thirty in the Netherlands, Sweden, and the United States. It was certified platinum by the Australian Recording Industry Association (ARIA) and Recorded Music NZ (RMNZ), gold by IFPI Danmark, and silver by the British Phonographic Industry (BPI).

An accompanying music video for "Señorita" was directed by Paul Hunter and was filmed at a club in Los Angeles in July 2003. It was nominated at the 2004 MTV Video Music Awards for Best Male Video. Timberlake performed the song on Saturday Night Live, the 46th Annual Grammy Awards, Wireless Festival, the 2013 MTV Video Music Awards, the Super Bowl LII halftime show, the Children's Hospital Los Angeles Gala, and the Recording Academy Honours Presented by the Black Music Collective. It was also included on the set lists for all seven of his concert tours.

== Background and composition ==
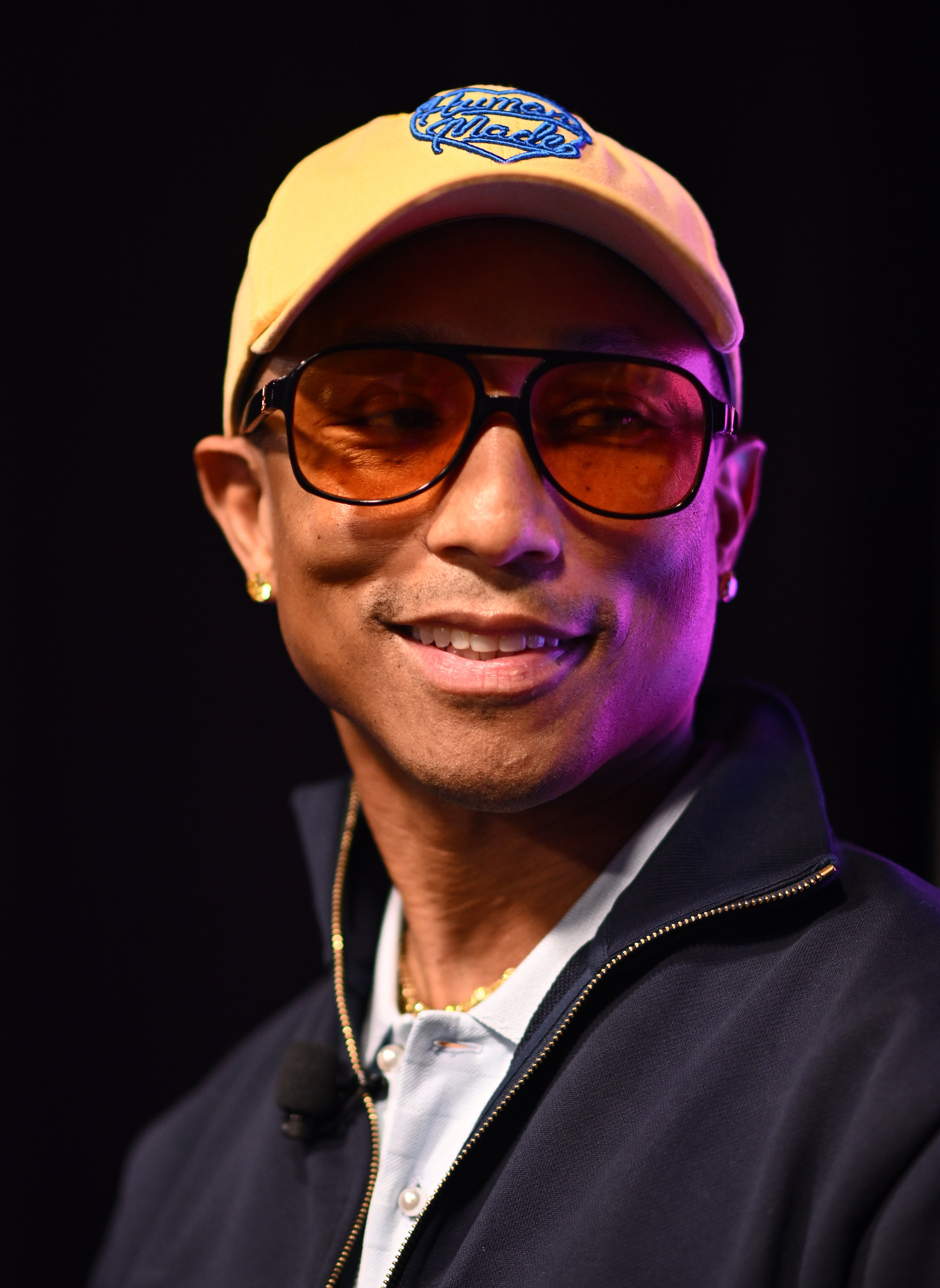
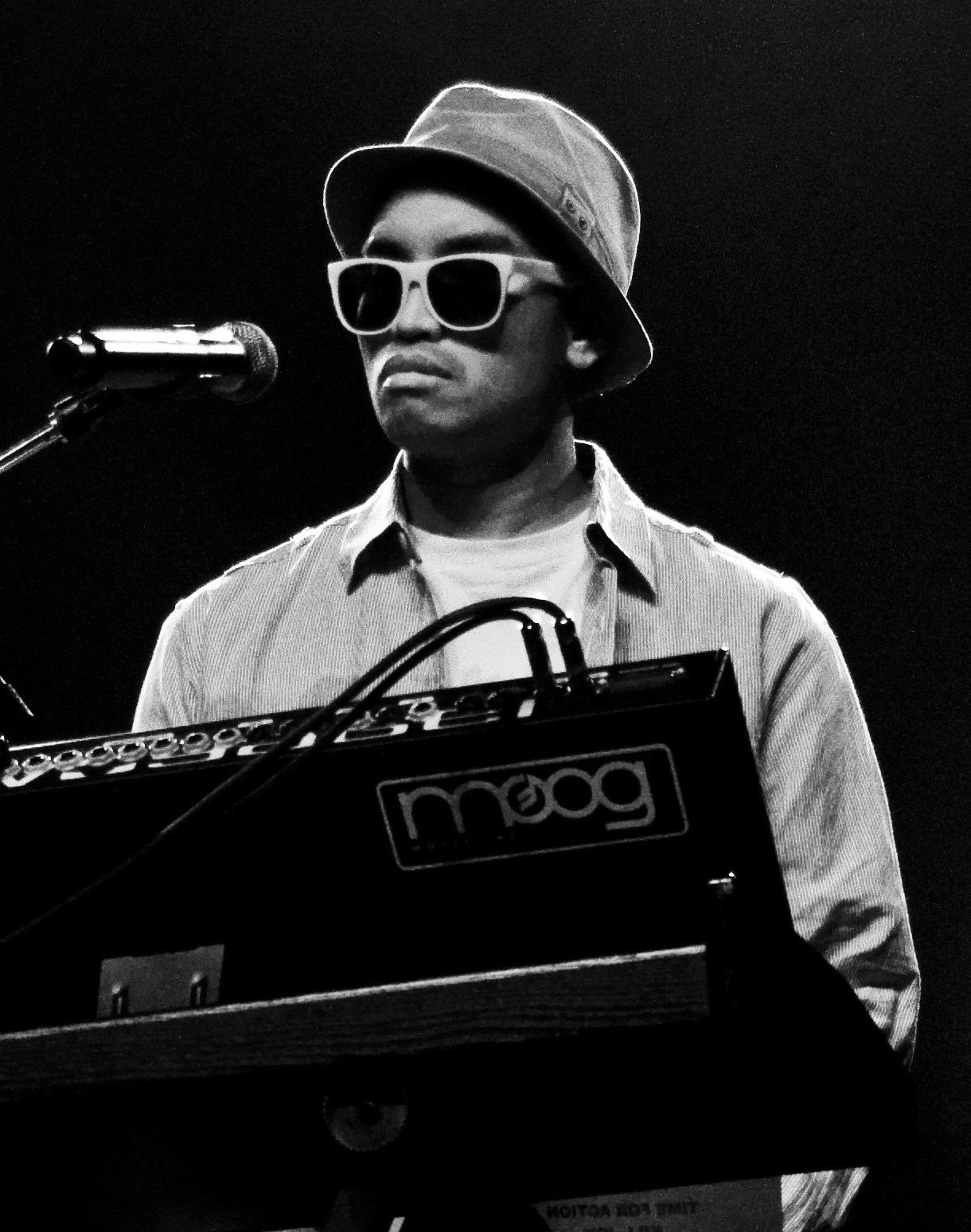
Pharrell Williams (left) and Chad Hugo (right) of the Neptunes produced and co-wrote "Señorita".

"Señorita" was written by Justin Timberlake with its producers, Pharrell Williams and Chad Hugo of the Neptunes. Before the release of Timberlake's debut solo studio album, Justified, Timberlake and the album's producers, Williams and Hugo, gave MTV News a preview of the record in August 2002. While discussing "Señorita", Hugo said that he expected the song to make the track listing of Justified. In another interview, Timberlake revealed that the song was influenced by singer-songwriter Stevie Wonder. Timberlake said that the song had "that groove that really fits into the summer". While the song was in development, Timberlake said he was "beatboxing the notes". He wrote the song imagining a "dark-skinned, voluptuous lady whose attention he is trying to capture".

"Señorita"
A 24-second sample of "Señorita", an up-tempo R&B, pop, and jazz ballad influenced by Stevie Wonder that features an electric piano strut, a cowbell chiming in the background, and a rhythm section.

"Señorita" is a "Spanish number" infused with an up-tempo R&B ballad. The dance song has been described as fast, "thumping", and "hot mid-tempo". The song is composed in the key of G♭ major and is in common time with a tempo of 96 beats per minute. The music begins with an electric piano strut that provides the main chordal accompaniment, while a cowbell chimes in the background. Timberlake sings in a "reasonable falsetto vamping". The song's "robust instrumentation" also features hand claps, a rhythm section, and "cruises on an unconventional reedy rhythm and crackling beat", according to Chuck Cavalaris of The Knoxville News-Sentinel. The track is also considered a "blues inflected track" and a dance jam. Kevin O'Hare of The Republican said the song is "a Latin-flavored cut with a pronounced beat". Lisa Rose of The Star-Ledger commented that the song has a "jazz-funk ... embellished with a ground-rumbling beat and horn section solos". Dave Ferman of the Fort Worth Star-Telegram said that the song has a "minimalist funk strut", while a contributor to the New Straits Times said that the single is "a funk song with an organic feel – and quite close to Stevie Wonder's soulful style".

According to The Dallas Morning News journalist Teresa Gubbins, the theme of the song is Timberlake singing about a girl with brown eyes. O'Hare noted that there are "some very amusing" improvisations as Timberlake guides the "guys and the ladies though their background vocal segment". AllMusic's Stephen Thomas Erlewine also reported that Timberlake exhorts "the fellas and ladies" in "Señorita" to sing separately "in a cringe-worthy affectation". Timberlake directs the men to sing, "It feels like somethin's heatin' up, can I leave with you?" and the women to sing, "I don't know what I'm thinking 'bout, really leavin' with you". Ally Cyr of the Portland Press Herald described it as resembling "a live club performance, having a little 'crowd participation' thrown in".

== Critical reception ==
Critics praised "Señorita"'s instrumentation and production. Frank Cicero of the Staten Island Advance cited it as a standout on Justified. Tyler Martin of Stylus Magazine praised its rhythm section, the "simple, yet distinctive beat that could only come from the Neptunes", and the extended sing-along outro. Jonathan Takiff of the Philadelphia Daily News wrote that the song and "Nothing Else", another song from the album, reshape "Stevie Wonder-style Latin pop grooves". Florida Today's Brittany McHenry described it as an "inventive, head-bobbing, gritty jam".

Reviewers also praised Timberlake's vocals and performance. David Browne of Entertainment Weekly found Timberlake more engaging when adopting a flirtatious persona, citing "Señorita" and "Rock Your Body" as examples. Howard Cohen of Knight Ridder compared Timberlake's falsetto and staccato vocal delivery on the track to Michael Jackson's style during the Thriller era. The Sun Sentinel's Sean Piccoli observed that Timberlake "plays off the beats" on "Señorita" with "an easy gamesmanship" that runs through some of Justified's thirteen tracks.

Other critics praised "Señorita"'s overall appeal and musical style. Denise Boyd of BBC Music wrote that its introduction "immediately grabs your attention". Writing for The Times, Lisa Verrico said that it could be NSYNC "with a salsa flavour". Along with "Rock Your Body" and "(And She Said) Take Me Now", the Lincoln Journal Star's L. Kent Wolgamott said that the song "pretty well takes the former Mouseketeer into full adulthood". Suzanne Rutter of The Monday Gazette said it was "made for dancing to, whether you're one of Justin's die-hard teenage fans or not".

Other writers expressed mixed or unfavorable opinions. The Journal News criticized Timberlake's posturing but praised the Neptunes for giving "Señorita" and "(And She Said) Take Me Now" "a teaspoon of flava". Jane Stevenson of Jam! wrote that it "suffers from being too cute and has an awful call-and-answer ending featuring 'the guys and the ladies'". Along with "Like I Love You" and "Cry Me a River", The Morning Call's Len Righi described the song as part of the "hokey, counterfeit dramas that give Justified a cheesiness comparable to the new Scooby-Doo and Shaggy chia pets". Lacey Hawkins of The Missoulian criticized Timberlake's high-pitched vocals during the song's closing call-and-response section.

== Release and commercial performance ==
Originally released as the opening track from Justified on November 5, 2002, "Señorita" was serviced to rhythmic contemporary and contemporary hit radio stations in the United States on July 7, 2003, as the album's fourth and final single. It was released as a maxi single in Australia and Germany on September 1, before being released as a 12-inch vinyl, CD single, and cassette single in the United Kingdom on September 15. In North America, "Señorita" peaked at number 27 on the US Billboard Hot 100 and number 19 on the Canadian Digital Song Sales chart. On airplay charts, it peaked at number 17 on Dance Airplay, number 5 on Pop Airplay, and number 29 on Rhythmic Airplay.

In Europe, "Señorita" peaked at number 61 in Austria, number 15 in Flanders, number 3 on the bubbling under chart in Wallonia, number 5 in Croatia, number 13 in Denmark, number 41 in France, number 51 in Germany, number 17 in Greece, number 15 in Ireland, number 37 in Italy, number 8 on the Dutch Top 40, number 26 on the Single Top 100, number 17 in Romania, number 13 on the Scottish Singles Chart, number 29 in Sweden, number 42 in Switzerland, number 13 on the UK Singles Chart, number 5 on the UK Airplay chart, and number 5 on the UK Hip Hop and R&B Singles Chart. It was certified gold by IFPI Danmark and silver by the British Phonographic Industry (BPI).

In Oceania, "Señorita" peaked at number 6 in Australia, number 1 on its urban chart, and number 4 in New Zealand. It was certified platinum by the Australian Recording Industry Association (ARIA) and Recorded Music NZ (RMNZ).

== Music video ==
A screenshot of the music video for "Señorita" where Timberlake is shown singing at a bar

The music video for "Señorita" was directed by Paul Hunter. The video was filmed in July 2003 and shot in a club in Los Angeles. The video features cameo appearances by both Pharrell Williams and Chad Hugo. In mid-2003, when asked about the concept of the video, Timberlake said that the video was still in development. He was asked whether he would be aiming his affection at a "lovely lady", to which Timberlake responded, "No. Why would you limit yourself to just one?"

The video begins with the song playing outside a bar. Inside, Timberlake is seen, and he goes to the bar. He looks at the stage area and immediately goes there. He takes the microphone and begins singing the song. Pharrell is shown playing the drums while Chad is at the keyboards throughout the video. Timberlake continues singing, but grabs the attention of a woman in a red dress (Natalie Martinez). Elsewhere, Timberlake, not on stage, is shown dancing with a woman wearing a white blouse, while he sings the song. In another part of the video, Timberlake dances with a different woman. In the bridge, he sings to the two women and dances with them, in separate shots. Following the bridge, he is then seen performing on stage. During part of the song, Timberlake directs the crowd of men and women, telling the men to sing, "It feels like somethin's heatin' up, can I leave with you?" and Timberlake himself sings, "I don't know what I'm thinking 'bout, really leavin' with you". Timberlake ends the song with "Gentlemen, good night / Ladies, good morning".

Actor Owen Wilson and his then-girlfriend, Carolina Cerisola, appear in the video. Johnni Macke of E! ranked it among Timberlake's best music videos, while Digital Spy ranked it among Timberlake's best music videos pre-The 20/20 Experience. At the 2004 MTV Video Music Awards, it was nominated in the category of Best Male Video.

== Live performances ==
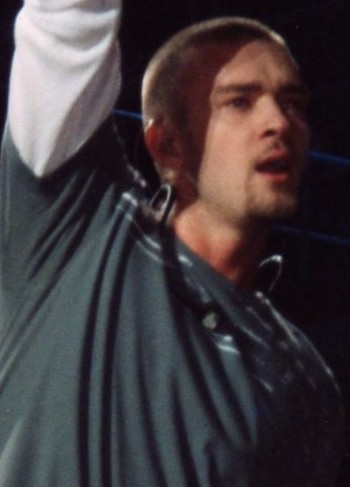
Timberlake performing on his 2003–2004 Justified World Tour

Timberlake performed "Señorita" on the twenty-ninth season of the sketch comedy show Saturday Night Live on October 11, 2003, when he hosted and was the musical guest. At the 46th Annual Grammy Awards in 2004, he also performed the song live and was accompanied by Latin jazz trumpeter Arturo Sandoval. On August 25, 2013, Timberlake accepted the Michael Jackson Video Vanguard Award at the 2013 MTV Video Music Awards, preceded by a medley of his songs, including "Señorita".

Timberlake also performed "Señorita" on Late Night with Jimmy Fallon in March 2013, the first day of the Wireless Festival in London in July 2013, the Super Bowl LII halftime show in February 2018, the iHeartRadio Music Festival in September 2018, at the Children's Hospital Los Angeles Gala in October 2022, at an "intimate" concert at Irving Plaza in New York City on January 31, his 43rd birthday, and in January 2026 at the Recording Academy Honours Presented by the Black Music Collective in tribute to Pharrell Williams, who received the Dr. Dre Global Impact Award.

"Señorita" was featured on the set lists for all seven of Timberlake's concert tours: The Justified World Tour (2003–2004), The Justified & Stripped Tour (2003), FutureSex/LoveShow (2007), Legends of the Summer Stadium Tour with rapper Jay-Z (2013), The 20/20 Experience World Tour (2013–2015), The Man of the Woods Tour (2018–2019), and The Forget Tomorrow World Tour (2024–2025). He also included it on the set list of his NPR Tiny Desk Concert on March 15, 2024.

== Track listings ==
Canadian CD single

1. "Señorita" (album version) – 4:54
2. "Señorita" (radio edit) – 4:29

Australian CD single

1. "Señorita" (album version) – 4:54
2. "Señorita" (instrumental) – 4:54
3. "Señorita" (Eddie's extended club mix) – 6:27
4. "Rock Your Body" (Vasquez club anthem) – 9:15
5. "Señorita" (video)

UK CD and cassette single

1. "Señorita" (radio edit short intro) – 4:16
2. "Señorita" (Eddie's crossover rhythm mix) – 4:18
3. "Señorita" (Eddie's extended dance mix) – 6:27
4. "Señorita" (Dr. Octavo 2-step mix) – 3:50

UK 12-inch single

A1. "Señorita" (Num club mix) – 7:43
B1. "Señorita" (Thick vocal mix) – 7:27
B2. "Señorita" (Eddie's crossover rhythm mix) – 4:18

European CD single

1. "Señorita" (radio edit short intro) – 4:16
2. "Señorita" (instrumental) – 4:54

European maxi-CD single

1. "Señorita" (album version) – 4:54
2. "Señorita" (instrumental) – 4:54
3. "Señorita" (Eddie's extended club mix) – 6:27
4. "Señorita" (video)

== Credits and personnel ==
Credits are adapted from the liner notes of Justified.

=== Locations ===
- Recorded at Master Sound Recording Studios, Virginia Beach
- Mixed at Windmark Recording, Virginia Beach

=== Personnel ===
- Songwriting – Justin Timberlake, Pharrell Williams, Chad Hugo
- Production – The Neptunes
- Recording – Andrew Coleman
- Mixing – Serban Ghenea
- Assistant engineering – Daniel Betancourt, Tim Roberts
- Additional Pro Tools engineering – John Hanes
- Instruments – Pharrell Williams, Chad Hugo
- Additional vocals – Pharrell Williams
- Background vocals – Lainie Aguilar
- Vocal arrangement – Justin Timberlake, Pharrell Williams

== Charts ==
=== Weekly charts ===
Weekly chart performance for "Señorita"
Chart (2003)	Peak position
Australia (ARIA)	6
Australian Urban (ARIA)	1
Austria (Ö3 Austria Top 40)	61
Belgium (Ultratop 50 Flanders)	15
Belgium (Ultratip Bubbling Under Wallonia)	3
Canadian Digital Song Sales (Billboard)	19
Croatia International Airplay (HRT)	5
Denmark (Tracklisten)	13
France (SNEP)	41
Germany (GfK)	51
Greece (IFPI)	17
Ireland (IRMA)	15
Italy (FIMI)	37
Netherlands (Dutch Top 40)	8
Netherlands (Single Top 100)	26
New Zealand (Recorded Music NZ)	4
Romania (Romanian Top 100)	17
Scottish Singles Sales (Official Charts)	13
Sweden (Sverigetopplistan)	29
Switzerland (Schweizer Hitparade)	42
UK Singles (Official Charts)	13
UK Airplay (Music Week)	5
UK Hip Hop/R&B (Official Charts)	5
US Billboard Hot 100	27
US Dance Airplay (Billboard)	17
US Pop Airplay (Billboard)	5
US Rhythmic Airplay (Billboard)	29

=== Year-end charts ===
Year-end chart performance for "Señorita"
Chart (2003)	Position
Australia (ARIA)	80
Belgium (Ultratop 50 Flanders)	96
Netherlands (Dutch Top 40)	100
New Zealand (RIANZ)	39
UK Airplay (Music Week)	39
US Mainstream Top 40 (Billboard)	46

== Certifications ==
Certifications and sales for "Señorita"
Region	Certification	Certified units/sales
Australia (ARIA)	Platinum	70,000^{‡}
Denmark (IFPI Danmark)	Gold	45,000^{‡}
New Zealand (RMNZ)	Platinum	30,000^{‡}
United Kingdom (BPI)	Silver	200,000^{‡}
^{‡} Sales+streaming figures based on certification alone.

== Release history ==
Release dates and formats for "Señorita"
Region	Date	Format(s)	Label	Ref.
United States	July 7, 2003	Rhythmic contemporary; contemporary hit radio	Jive	
Australia	September 1, 2003	Maxi single	Jive	
Germany	September 1, 2003	Maxi single	Jive	
United Kingdom	September 15, 2003	12-inch vinyl; CD single; cassette single	Jive	
