= Like I Love You =

2002 single by Justin Timberlake

Single by Justin Timberlake

from the album Justified
- Released: September 17, 2002
- Recorded: 2002
- Studio: Master Sound Recording (Virginia Beach, Virginia); Windmark (Virginia Beach, Virginia)
- Genre: R&B
- Length: 4:43
- Label: Jive
- Songwriters: Justin Timberlake; Chad Hugo; Pharrell Williams; Terrence Thornton; Gene Thornton
- Producer: The Neptunes

Justin Timberlake singles chronology
"Like I Love You" (2002)	"Cry Me a River" (2002)

Clipse singles chronology
"When the Last Time" (2002)	"Like I Love You" (2002)	"Star" (2002)

Music video
- "Like I Love You" on YouTube

"Like I Love You" is a song by American singer Justin Timberlake with a guest rap from hip-hop duo Clipse. It was included on Timberlake's debut studio album, Justified (2002), and was released by Jive Records as his debut solo single on September 17, 2002, following the announced hiatus of NSYNC earlier that year. Timberlake and Clipse co-wrote the song with its producers the Neptunes (Chad Hugo and Pharrell Williams). According to Williams, the song's drums were an ode to the funk era.

"Like I Love You" received positive reviews from music critics. Commercially, it peaked within the top 10 in Australia, Belgium, Croatia, Denmark, Ireland, the Netherlands, New Zealand, Norway, Portugal, and the United Kingdom. Timberlake first performed the song at the 2002 MTV Video Music Awards in New York City, on August 29, 2002. It also received a nomination at the Grammy Awards of 2003 for Best Rap/Sung Collaboration.

== Writing and recording ==
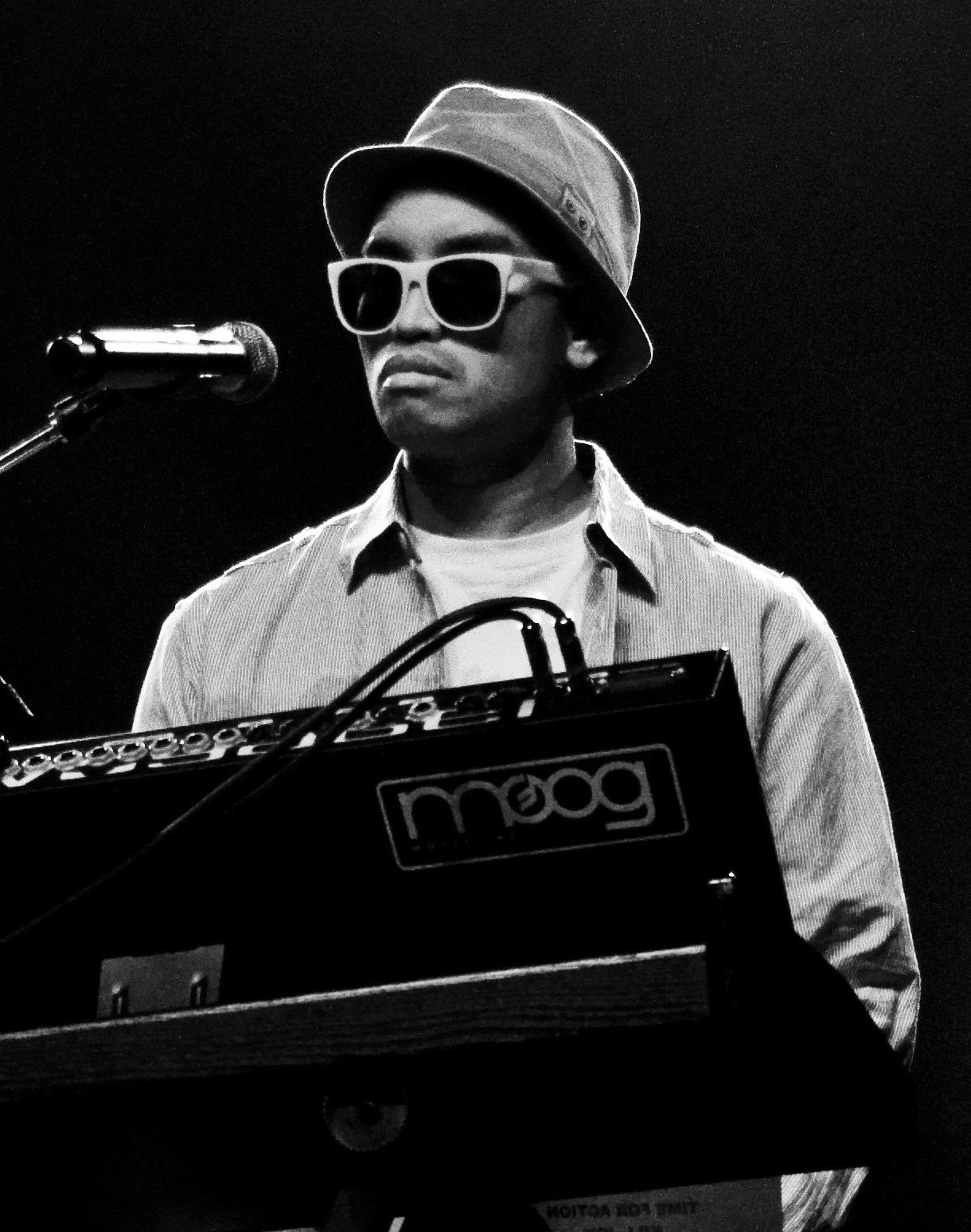
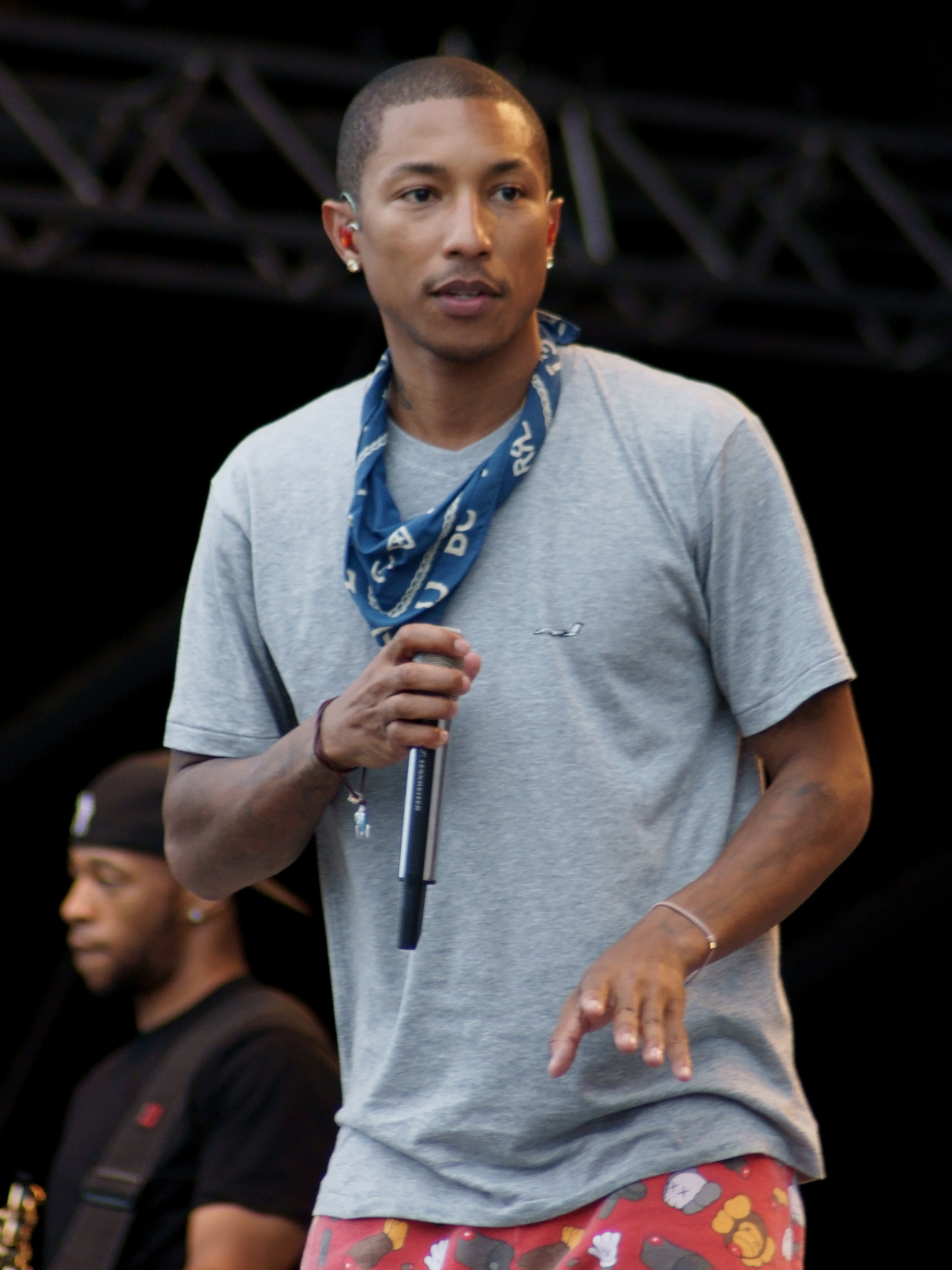
Chad Hugo (left) and Pharrell Williams (right) co-wrote the song with Timberlake.

MTV News reported in July 2002 that Chad Hugo and Pharrell Williams (known collectively as the Neptunes) were working on multiple tracks for Justin Timberlake's debut solo album Justified. When the duo picked Timberlake up from his hotel in Virginia Beach, they listened to Earth, Wind & Fire albums during the car ride. The songs' background was the feeling the duo wanted to convey in the album's musical content. In response to this, Timberlake said: "Nobody's ever heard anything like that before ... a white boy singing this kind of music." Hugo revealed that Timberlake did not care what people would say. The production duo commented that, despite not being content with sampling music, for inspiration, they listened to both Off the Wall and Thriller, albums by Michael Jackson. Hugo commented that they "wanted to re-create that sense of those timeless, classic songs" without "any of the 'bling, bling, hit me on my two-way' style of the new R&B", noting that it would contain "elements of the old and the new."

"Like I Love You" was the first song they recorded together and the first song Timberlake recorded for Justified. Timberlake, Hugo and Williams wrote the song, while the production was done by the latter two. The song features a rap verse written and performed by hip hop duo Clipse. "Like I Love You" was recorded at Master Sound Recording Studios and Windmark Recording, both located in Virginia Beach, with Andrew Coleman serving as a recording engineer. Serban Ghenea mixed the song at Windmark Recording, while Daniel Botancourt and Tim Roberts were additional engineers. John Hanes provided the additional Pro Tools engineering. All the instrumentation was delivered by Hugo and Williams, while the song's vocal arrangement was provided by Williams together with Timberlake.

== Release and promotion ==
"Like I Love You" was chosen as Timberlake's debut single and the lead single of Justified. According to Timberlake, there was "never any question" in his mind whether or not the song would be released as his debut single. Of the song, Timberlake called it "a new beginning for me" differing from what he previously made with his band NSYNC, asking, "why call on some big-name hip-hop artist when I could get somebody that feels new so it could feel like we were chomping at the bit at the same time?"

On October 14, 2002, a CD single was released in Germany containing the album version of the song, its instrumental, and two club extended mixes. The same version of the single was released in Canada on October 17, 2002. In the UK, the album version of "Like I Love You", its instrumental, and one extended remix were physically released on October 21, 2002. The song was released as a 12-inch single on November 19, 2002, in Italy and Spain. On November 24, 2002, it was also released in France as a CD single.

Timberlake made his debut solo performance at the 2002 MTV Video Music Awards, performing "Like I Love You" on August 29, 2002. The song was also included on the set lists for the Justified World Tour (2003–2004), the Justified and Stripped Tour (2003), FutureSex/LoveShow (2007), the Legends of the Summer Stadium Tour (2013), the 20/20 Experience World Tour (2013–2015), the Man of the Woods Tour (2018–2019), and the Forget Tomorrow World Tour (2024–2025).

== Critical reception ==
"This is quite possibly the best post-boy-band debut single of all time. He booked the hottest producers (The Neptunes) and a bubbling-under hip-hop duo (Clipse) to show that the bubblegum had officially popped. There couldn't have been a better introduction to Justin Timberlake, solo star."

— Billboard's Katie Atkinson in 2016.

"Like I Love You" received positive reviews from music critics. Entertainment Weekly's Craig Seymour wrote "[Timberlake proves that] while no innovator, he is a fine student". In his review of the album Justified for Rolling Stone, Ben Ratliff noted its "minimalism influenced by Michael Jackson", but a "softer, harmony-and-hook-filled chorus sets it off, thus pleasing preteen girls and beat junkies alike."

Denise Boyd, writing for BBC Music, said that the song was a "sure bet for success" with the Neptunes producing the song, but "Justin's vocal arrangement has given this offering a distinctive edge and it stands out as one of the best Neptunes productions this year." Slant Magazine called it a "well-oiled Neptunes production" and "the acoustic guitar loops and snap-crackle-pop percussion of "Like I Love You" pick up where NSYNC's hit "Girlfriend" left off."

In 2013, Lauren Nostro from Complex placed "Like I Love You" at number three in a ranking of the 25 best Timberlake songs. Katie Atkinson of Billboard placed it fourteenth in a ranking of Timberlake's singles; Rania Aniftos ranked it among Timberlake's sixteen-best collaborations; and Adelle Platon ranked it among Timberlake's fourteen-best hip-hop/R&B collaborations. In 2017, Spin staff ranked it as the best boy-band solo debut single.

=== Accolades ===
Organization	Year	Category	Result	Ref.
Grammy Awards	2003	Best Rap/Sung Collaboration	Nominated	

== Commercial performance ==
"Like I Love You" debuted on the US Billboard Hot 100 at number 67 for the issue dated September 7, 2002. The next week, it climbed to number 46. It eventually reached a peak of number 11 and stayed on the chart for 36 weeks. The song was more successful on the US Pop Songs and Dance Club Songs charts, where it peaked at number four and one, respectively. Additionally, it charted on the US Hot R&B/Hip-Hop Songs chart, peaking at 53. The song was more successful in Oceania. On the Australian Singles Chart, the song debuted at number nine for the week dated October 27, 2002. The next week, it fell to number 11, before eventually reaching its peak of number eight in its third week and remaining there for three consecutive weeks. "Like I Love You" stayed on the chart for a total of twelve weeks and was certified platinum by the Australian Recording Industry Association (ARIA) for shipments of 70,000 units. It debuted at number six on the New Zealand Singles Chart for the week dated November 10, 2002, staying on the chart for twelve weeks.

In the United Kingdom, "Like I Love You" peaked at number two for the week dated November 2, 2002. It stayed on the chart for 16 weeks, making its last appearance on February 15, 2003, at number 57. The song debuted at number five on the Irish Singles Chart. "Like I Love You" debuted at number four on the Danish Singles Chart, managing to stay at the position for two consecutive weeks before starting to fall on the chart. It stayed on the chart for a total of 14 weeks. The single debuted at number 14 on the Norwegian Singles Chart for the week dated October 25, 2002. After three weeks, it peaked at number 10 on the chart. Additionally, the song charted and peaked at number 14 on the Swiss Singles Chart.

== Music video ==
=== Background ===
The official music video for "Like I Love You" was released on September 9, 2002, as featured in an episode of MTV's Making the Video. The opening scenes at the convenience store were filmed at a 7-Eleven storefront at the corner of Oxford Street and Hazeltine Avenue in Van Nuys, California. The arcade and rap scenes featuring hip hop duo Clipse were filmed at College Arcade in Downtown Los Angeles. The nightclub dance scenes were also filmed in Los Angeles at Grand Avenue Nightclub. The video was directed by Diane Martel from August 22–24, 2002. Marty Kudelka, who created the choreography, can be seen dancing in the video. As of March 2026, the music video has over 112 million views on YouTube.

=== Synopsis ===
The video is spliced into three parts: Justin Timberlake dancing outside a 7-Eleven store at night wearing a 7-Eleven shirt and red beanie, Timberlake inside an arcade wearing a leather jacket and snapback, and close-up shots of Timberlake singing to the camera. Clipse and Pharrell Williams both appear during Clipse's rap verse in the arcade alongside Timberlake.

== Credits and personnel ==
Credits are adapted from the liner notes of Justified.

Recording and mixing

- Recorded at Master Sound Recording Studios and Windmark Recording, Virginia Beach; mixed at Windmark Recording, Virginia Beach.

Personnel

- Songwriting – Justin Timberlake, Chad Hugo, Pharrell Williams
- Production – The Neptunes
- Rap Verse – Clipse
- Recording – Andrew Coleman
- Mixing – Serban Ghenea
- Assistant engineers – Daniel Botancourt, Tim Roberts
- Additional Pro Tools Engineering – John Hanes
- All instruments – Pharrell Williams, Chad Hugo
- Vocal arrangement – Justin Timberlake, Pharrell Williams

== Charts ==
=== Weekly charts ===
Weekly chart performance
Chart (2002–2003)	Peak position
Australia (ARIA)	8
Australian Urban (ARIA)	3
Austria (Ö3 Austria Top 40)	29
Belgium (Ultratop 50 Flanders)	6
Belgium (Ultratop 50 Wallonia)	27
Canada (Nielsen SoundScan)	11
Croatia (HRT)	8
Denmark (Tracklisten)	4
Europe (Eurochart Hot 100)	5
Europe (European Hit Radio)	13
Germany (GfK)	16
Greece (IFPI)	27
Hungary (Rádiós Top 40)	36
Hungary (Single Top 40)	20
Ireland (IRMA)	5
Italy (FIMI)	17
Netherlands (Dutch Top 40)	5
Netherlands (Single Top 100)	5
New Zealand (Recorded Music NZ)	6
Norway (VG-lista)	10
Portugal (AFP)	9
Romania (Romanian Top 100)	71
Scottish Singles Sales (Official Charts)	5
Spain (Promusicae)	20
Sweden (Sverigetopplistan)	14
Switzerland (Schweizer Hitparade)	14
UK Singles (Official Charts)	2
UK Airplay (Music Week)	4
UK Indie (Official Charts)	1
UK Hip Hop/R&B (Official Charts)	2
US Billboard Hot 100	11
US Dance Club Songs (Billboard) Deep Dish & Basement Jaxx mixes	1
US Dance Singles Sales (Billboard) Deep Dish & Basement Jaxx mixes	3
US Hot R&B/Hip-Hop Songs (Billboard)	53
US Pop Airplay (Billboard)	4
US Rhythmic Airplay (Billboard)	17

=== Year-end charts ===
2002 year-end chart performance
Chart (2002)	Position
Australia (ARIA)	51
Belgium (Ultratop 50 Flanders)	64
Canada (Nielsen SoundScan)	100
Ireland (IRMA)	58
Netherlands (Dutch Top 40)	51
Netherlands (Single Top 100)	43
UK Singles (OCC)	33
UK Airplay (Music Week)	65
US Billboard Hot 100	99
US Mainstream Top 40 (Billboard)	47
US Rhythmic Top 40 (Billboard)	82

2003 year-end chart performance
Chart (2003)	Position
US Mainstream Top 40 (Billboard)	80

== Certifications ==
Certifications and sales for "Like I Love You"
Region	Certification	Certified units/sales
Australia (ARIA)	Platinum	70,000^{^}
New Zealand (RMNZ)	Gold	7,500^{*}
United Kingdom (BPI)	Platinum	600,000^{‡}
^{*} Sales figures based on certification alone.^{^} Shipments figures based on certification alone.^{‡} Sales+streaming figures based on certification alone.

== Release history ==
Release dates and formats
Region	Date	Format	Label	Ref.
United States	September 17, 2002	Contemporary hit radio; rhythmic contemporary radio	Jive	
Australia	October 14, 2002	Maxi single	Jive	
Germany	October 14, 2002	Maxi single	Jive	
Canada	October 17, 2002	CD single	Jive	
United Kingdom	October 21, 2002	CD single; cassette single	Jive	
Italy	November 19, 2002	12-inch single	Jive	
Spain	November 19, 2002	12-inch single	Jive	
France	November 25, 2002	CD single	Jive	

== See also ==
- List of number-one dance singles of 2003 (U.S.)
