= Cry Me a River (Justin Timberlake song) =

2002 single by Justin Timberlake

Single by Justin Timberlake

from the album Justified
- Released: November 25, 2002
- Recorded: 2002
- Studio: Westlake (Los Angeles)
- Genre: Funk; pop; R&B
- Length: 4:50
- Label: Jive
- Songwriters: Justin Timberlake; Scott Storch; Timothy Mosley
- Producer: Timbaland

Justin Timberlake singles chronology
"Like I Love You" (2002)	"Cry Me a River" (2002)	"Work It" (2003)

Music video
- "Cry Me a River" on YouTube

"Cry Me a River" is a song by American singer Justin Timberlake for his debut solo album, Justified (2002). It was thought to be inspired by Timberlake's former relationship with singer Britney Spears. Jive Records released the song to contemporary hit and rhythmic radio in the United States on November 25, 2002, as the album's second single. Accompanied by an electric piano, beatbox, guitars, synthesizers, Arabian-inspired riffs and Gregorian chants, "Cry Me a River" is a funk, pop and R&B song about a brokenhearted man who moves on from his past.

"Cry Me a River" received acclaim from music critics, who praised Timbaland's production while calling it a standout track on Justified. The song earned several lists of best of the year and the decade (2000s), while Rolling Stone included it on their 500 Greatest Songs of All Time at 484. It won the Grammy Award for Best Male Pop Vocal Performance at the 2004 ceremony. The song peaked at number three on the US Billboard Hot 100 and Pop Songs charts and charted in the top ten in other countries. It was certified double platinum by both the Australian Recording Industry Association (ARIA) and the British Phonographic Industry (BPI).

Filmmaker Francis Lawrence directed the music video for "Cry Me a River" at 24860 Pacific Coast Hwy in Malibu, California. In the controversial video, Timberlake's character invades the home of his ex-lover and films himself having sexual activity with another woman. Spears alleged that the video was a publicity stunt, but Timberlake maintained that she did not inspire the production. In 2011, however, Timberlake admitted his breakup with Spears inspired the video. The clip won the awards for Best Male Video and Best Pop Video at the 2003 MTV Video Music Awards. Timberlake performed "Cry Me a River" on all seven of his major concert tours. The song has been covered by various artists without chart success.

== Writing and production ==
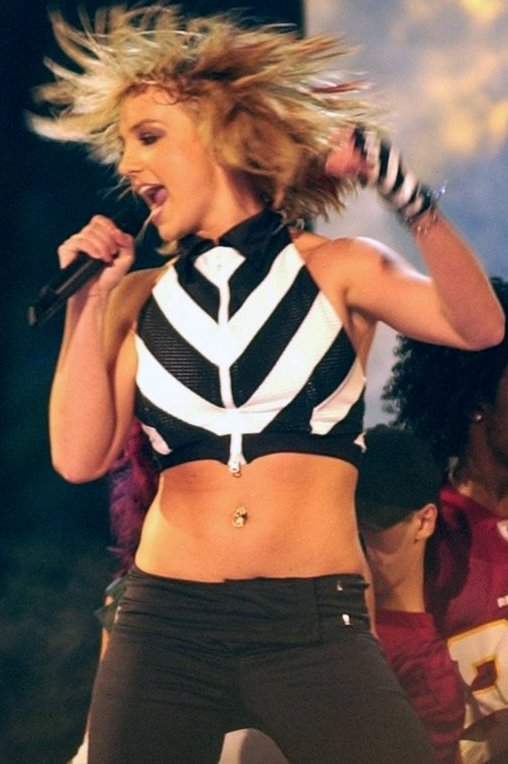
Timberlake acknowledged in December 2011 that the inspiration behind "Cry Me a River" was his ended relationship with Britney Spears.

Timberlake and Scott Storch wrote "Cry Me a River" with Timbaland, who produced the song. Storch found working with Timberlake easy because of the song's meaning. Reporters believed its lyrics were inspired by Timberlake's failing relationship with singer Britney Spears after the two split in late 2002. At the time, Spears was rumored to have had an affair with her and Timberlake's mutual friend, choreographer and songwriter Wade Robson. More than 20 years later, Spears confirmed she "made out with [Robson]" on one occasion after learning that Timberlake had cheated on her. Timberlake told MTV News, "I'm not going to specifically say if any song is about anybody. I will say writing a couple of songs on the record helped me deal with a couple of things. To me songs are songs. They can stem from things that completely happened to you personally or they can stem from ideas that you think could happen to you." In December 2011, Timberlake said that he had written "Cry Me a River" after an argument over the phone: "I was on a phone call that was not the most enjoyable phone call. I walked into the studio and he [Timbaland] could tell I was visibly angry." Timbaland recalled, "I was like, 'Man, don't worry about it' and he was like, 'I can't believe she did that to me' and he was like, 'You were my sun, you were my earth.'"

"Cry Me a River" was recorded at Westlake Recording Studios in Los Angeles by Senator Jimmy D, while Carlos "Storm" Martinez served as the assistant engineer. Jimmy Douglass and Timbaland mixed the song at Manhattan Center Studios in New York City. Timberlake arranged the vocals and was a backup singer alongside Timbaland, Marsha Ambrosius, Tye Tribbett, and Greater Anointing. The ad lib "Cry me, cry meeee" at the end of the song was among Ambrosius's contributions. Storch compared Timberlake's vocals on "Cry Me a River" to R&B and rock singer Daryl Hall. Larry Gold provided the string arrangement and conducting, while Storch and Bill Pettaway played the clavinet and guitar, respectively.

== Release and response ==
"Cry Me a River" was released as the second single from Justified. Jive Records serviced the song to contemporary and rhythmic radio in the United States on November 25, 2002. On December 23, three remixes were released as a 12-inch single in Canada and France. On January 5, 2003, the song was sent to urban contemporary radio stations in the US. It was released as a CD single in Germany on January 23. The single contains the album version of the song and the remixes on its 12-inch single release. A CD single, which included Johnny Fiasco's remix of the song and two additional remixes of "Like I Love You", was released on February 3 and 6 in the United Kingdom and Canada, respectively. "Cry Me a River" was released as a CD single in the US on February 18. The single features the album version of the song, its instrumental and four remixes.

Following its release, there was media speculation that Spears had written a song as a response to "Cry Me a River"; she denied the rumors, explaining, "You know, it's funny. I read that I wrote this song and I wrote these lyrics and that's not my style. I would never do that." Annet Artani, who co-wrote Spears' 2003 song "Everytime", stated that the song was written as a response to "Cry Me a River". When asked during an interview with Diane Sawyer on PrimeTime in 2003, if "Everytime" was about Timberlake, Spears responded, "I'll let the song speak for itself."

== Composition and lyrical interpretation ==
"Cry Me a River"
A 27-second sample of "Cry Me a River", which uses clavinet, beatbox, guitars, synthesizers, Arabian-inspired riffs and Gregorian chants in its composition.

"Cry Me a River" is a funk, pop and R&B song with instrumentation that features clavinet, guitars, beatboxing, synthesizers, Arabian-inspired riffs and Gregorian chants. The instruments are arranged into what critics described as a graceful and mysterious melody. Jane Stevenson of Jam! said the single combines gospel and opera. Tyler Martin of Stylus Magazine enjoyed the way that the song unconventionally mixed a range of experimental sounds. According to Martin, the wave synth affects the real strings to create an unusual dissonance. The song's chorus devolves into a choral reading in which Timberlake pleads over the group. "Cry Me a River" finishes with a Timbaland vocal sample heard during the chorus.

"Cry Me a River" is written in the key of G♯ minor, in alla breve, with a tempo of 74 beats per minute. Timberlake's vocal range spans from the low note of C♯_{3} to the high note of B_{4}. Billboard magazine critics called "Cry Me a River" a bittersweet song, in which the singer's "familiar tenor belting" is tempered with a soulful falsetto and a "convincingly aggressive rock-spiked baritone" rasp. David Browne of Entertainment Weekly labeled the song "a haunted, pained farewell".

Lyrically, the song is about a heartbroken man who moves on from his past. A Rolling Stone reviewer called the song a "breakup aria". According to Caroline Sullivan of The Guardian, "Cry Me a River" stands out for its "slow-building sense of drama", which highlights Timberlake at his "husky best". The song begins with the phrase "You were my sun, you were my earth", which according to Timbaland was Timberlake's inspiration to write the song. Tanya L. Edwards of MTV News observed that Timberlake was lied to and wronged, and said this is demonstrated by the lyrics: "You don't have to say whatcha did / I already know, I found out from him / Now there's just no chance." The chorus contains the lines: "Told me you loved me, why did you leave me all alone / Now you tell me you need me when you call me on the phone." Slant Magazine's Sal Cinquemani called Timberlake's 2007 single "What Goes Around... Comes Around" an ostensible sequel to "Cry Me a River" both lyrically and musically. Jason Lipshutz of Billboard stated that aside from the presence of Timbaland's "fantastically cluttered production", the difference between "Cry Me a River" and Timberlake's 2013 single "Mirrors" is clear: "10 years ago, Timberlake was broken, and now he is whole".

== Reception and accolades ==
"Cry Me a River, in all its over-sharing glory, has become a classic of its genre; a song that's able to say much more via one acoustic version than any number of media-trained interviews. It should act as the benchmark for any future pop star break-up songs."

— The Guardian's Michael Cragg in 2013.

"Cry Me a River" received widespread critical acclaim after release. Jane Stevenson of Jam! and Sal Cinquemani of Slant Magazine called it a standout track on Justified. Stephen Thomas Erlewine of AllMusic selected the song as a highlight in his review of Justified. Peter Robinson of NME described it as a "twisted epic" and "an acidic, filthy little song teeming with spite and retribution, with Timbaland's pounding." Rolling Stone's Ben Ratliff viewed his production of "Cry Me a River" as exceptional. Denise Boyd of BBC Music felt that the song's lyrics play as large a role as Timbaland's production, unlike other songs on Justified. David Browne of Entertainment Weekly concluded that the song is "a genuine stunner" that should leave Timberlake's fellow 'N Syncers concerned that he truly may not need them any more.

John Mitchell of MTV News called "Cry Me a River" and "What Goes Around... Comes Around" "kiss-off songs", with Timberlake's revenge on Spears present throughout the lyrics. VH1's Emily Exton wrote, "By stretching the boundaries of pop—and fusing it with notes of R&B, lots of electric goodness, and haunting choral vocals—Timberlake's kiss-off song instantly becomes more poignant, a pointed reaction to the hurt he's experienced by someone he once loved." According to Complex, the song "made people completely forget about 'N Sync and start asking what Timberlake would do next." The single won a Grammy Award for Best Male Pop Vocal Performance at the 2004 award ceremony. It was nominated for Song of the Year at the 2003 MTV Europe Music Awards. For Pitchfork Media, it was ranked the third-best song of 2003.

=== Retrospective lists ===
Rolling Stone ranked "Cry Me a River" at number 20 on their list of the 100 Best Songs of the 2000s; a columnist for the magazine wrote that the real inspiration behind the song was the formation of the Timberlake–Timbaland team, "a match made in pop heaven". In 2012, the magazine placed it at number 484 on their list of "The 500 Greatest Songs of All Time". VH1 ranked "Cry Me a River" at number 59 on their list of the 100 Greatest Songs of the 2000s. The Daily Telegraph listed the song at number 40 on the "100 songs that defined the Noughties". In 2015, Spotify re-ranked Rolling Stone's 500 Greatest Songs in two different lists. "Cry Me a River" ranked at number 14 on "by all Spotify users" and 10 on "streams from millennial users". In 2018, Rolling Stone ranked the song 46 on their list "The 100 Greatest Songs of the Century – So Far".

== Commercial performance ==
"Cry Me a River" debuted at number 44 on the US Billboard Hot 100 in the issue dated December 21, 2002, earning the Hot Shot Debut honor with 29.6 million audience impressions. On February 1, 2003, the single reached a peak of number three, becoming Timberlake's first solo single to reach that position. The song debuted on the US Pop Songs chart at number 37 in the issue dated December 14, 2002 and reached a peak of three on February 1, 2003. For the issue dated December 28, 2002, "Cry Me a River" debuted at number 75 on the US Hot R&B/Hip-Hop Songs chart. It reached a peak of 11 on March 8, 2003. It also peaked at number two on the US Hot Dance Club Songs, becoming Timberlake's second top-three song, after his debut single "Like I Love You" reached number one. As of August 2003, remixes of the single have sold more than 61,000 units in the United States. As of 2018, the song has sold 1.2 million copies in the country.

The song debuted at number two on the Australian Singles Chart on March 9, 2003. It fell to number six in the following week. "Cry Me a River" became Timberlake's first top-three solo single on the chart. The song remained on the chart for 12 consecutive weeks. It was certified gold by the Australian Recording Industry Association (ARIA) for shipments of 35,000 units. The single debuted at number 44 in New Zealand on March 9, 2003. After two weeks on the chart, it reached a peak of 11. It remained on the chart for 11 weeks.

In the United Kingdom, "Cry Me a River", debuted at number two on February 15, 2003. The next week it fell to number three, before returning to its original peak on March 1, 2003; it stayed on the chart for 13 weeks. The song has sold over 365,000 copies in the country as of 2015. It debuted at number 14 on the French Singles Chart on April 5, 2003. After three weeks, "Cry Me a River" peaked at number six, and it stayed on the chart for 21 weeks. It was less successful on the Italian Singles Chart, where it peaked at number 14 and stayed on the chart for four weeks. "Cry Me a River" also peaked at number five in Belgium (Wallonia), at number six in the Republic of Ireland and the Netherlands, at number seven in Belgium (Flanders), and at number 10 in Germany, Norway, and Sweden.

== Music video ==
=== Development and release ===
The music video for "Cry Me a River" was directed by Francis Lawrence, and filmed in Malibu, California on October 22, 2002. Lawrence created the video's concept and told MTV News, "[Justin and I] had a conversation on the phone and all he said was he wanted to have some dancing in it, but to do my thing. He told me what the song was about, but in a [general way] as well. He just said it was a kiss-off song and so I came up with this idea and he went for it." Though the name "Britney" was not allowed in the video or on set, Lawrence alluded to Spears the best he could. He explained: "There was just this unspoken agreement between [Justin and I]. Because [Justin and Britney] were on the same label; that's part of the reason I thought the label would never, ever go for it. It was all about implying certain things, there's little elements and details that play throughout [the video] and tie it in." Timberlake enjoyed these details, or clues, which included a reference to Spears's tattoo and her newsboy hat.

"I didn't want to see a sentimental take on the song – I was much more interested in seeing the dark, twisted version, and luckily he went for it. And clearly that scared other people away, but not Justin.

Honestly, I think it was good for him in that moment of transition, because people thought he was a little milquetoast coming out of NSYNC, a little squeaky-clean and so to do something like this shifted people's perceptions of him a little bit."

— Francis Lawrence talks about the creative concept for the video in 2017.

Lawrence revealed that executives of Jive Records were also nervous about other aspects of the video, such as Timberlake's representation of a voyeur and the tone of some scenes he was portraying with a girl. "That's the thing I liked most about this project, was that he was coming into it with a super clean-cut image with 'N Sync and he's such a nice guy and so handsome and what I was into doing was making him be a bit scary. Lurking around the house in the rain, throwing a rock through her window, being a peeping Tom, getting revenge and doing stuff that's not really what a nice guy does." The shoot lasted three days, and involved a rain machine that gave the video a "sort of noir" feeling. To create the illusion of Timberlake dancing and floating in the house he breaks into, dancers in green-screen suits lifted, dropped, and carried Timberlake around via handles underneath Timberlake's jacket.

The music video for "Cry Me a River" premiered on MTV's TRL on November 25, 2002, the same day the single was sent to radio stations. Calling in to TRL to premiere the video, Timberlake emphasized to Carson Daly, "The video is not about her. The video is about me." The video was released onto the iTunes Store on April 28, 2003.

=== Synopsis ===
Timberlake stalking the blonde woman who portrays Spears inside her house

The video begins with a blonde woman, played by model and actress Lauren Hastings (portraying Spears), walking out of her house hand-in-hand with an unidentified man. The couple leaves in the woman's car (a silver Porsche 911 Carrera Cabriolet (996)) as Timberlake rolls down the window of a black Mercedes-Benz S-Class (W220), from which he and his friend (Timbaland) have been watching the woman. Timberlake breaks into the house by throwing a rock through a window and proceeds through the woman's house, with anti-gravity jumps and slides, not causing any other visible damage, except for kicking a picture frame of the woman across the living room. Then he searches some drawers and finds a video camera, while the driver of the car, Timbaland, signals for his female accomplice in the back of the car, played by model Kiana Bessa, to go in. She enters the house and goes with Timberlake to a bedroom, where she starts to undress and kiss Timberlake, who has a smug expression while being filmed. They stay in the bedroom for a moment; then the accomplice exits the house but a still-cocky Timberlake stays. As the blonde woman returns, he follows her around the house and hides in a closet as she showers. He gets closer to her and touches the glass surrounding the shower. The blonde woman senses someone in the room and turns around, but Timberlake is gone. She leaves the bathroom and goes into her bedroom, where the video he made with his new lover plays on the television.

=== Reception ===
After the video's TRL premiere, Carson Daly noted that Justin's character in the video has "an American Psycho feel" to it, to which Justin replied, "Hey man, I'm crazy." Peter Robinson of NME wrote that the video shows "what Justin looks like after he's had sex. Clue: he looks pretty good." According to Virginia Heffernan of The New York Times, Timberlake channels the character Neo from The Matrix film series, "pacing anxiously around wet and metallic interiors". At the 2003 MTV Video Music Awards, the video for "Cry Me a River" won in the categories of Best Male Video and Best Pop Video. It had also been nominated for Video of the Year, Best Direction in a Video and Viewer's Choice. In a 2006 issue proclaiming Timberlake the International Man of the Year, British GQ declared, "One minute Timberlake was a forgotten relic of teeny pop, the next he's making the video for 'Cry Me A River' in which he's stalking his ex and creeping up behind her to sniff her hair. And within the space of a year no one could give two hoots about his New Mickey Mouse Club beginnings. Timberlake suddenly became Trousersnake and he'd done the impossible—he'd become cool."

Following the release of the music video, Us Weekly ran a cover story titled Britney Vs. Justin: The War Is On. Timberlake continued to deny that Spears inspired the video. However, Spears told Rolling Stone in October 2003 that she received a call from Timberlake saying there would be a look-alike of her in his music video. She states that he reassured her by saying, "Don't worry about it. It's not a big deal". Spears, who had not seen the video, says she allowed him to do so but became infuriated after watching it. She recalled that when she asked why he had made a video about her, he replied, "Well, I got a controversial video." She stated that it was a great publicity stunt, commenting, "So he got what he wanted. I think it looks like such a desperate attempt, personally." After the release of Spears' video for "Toxic" (2003), Jennifer Vineyard of MTV News said her video "[made] "Cry Me a River" look like child's play".

In Spears' 2023 memoir, she describes the video as featuring "a woman who looks like me cheat[ing on] him and he wanders around sad in the rain." She writes that the negative media attention after the video's release turned her into a "harlot who'd broken the heart of America's golden boy."

In 2013, Billboard editor Jason Lipshutz opined the clip was "one of the more brilliant musical moments in pop music since the dawn of the century. The visual is JT's most controversial music video to date." He added, "The "Cry Me a River" video served a dual purpose for Timberlake: to court controversy, and to make its star seem more grown-up." In 2018, Billboard critics named it the 24th "greatest music video of the 21st century."

== Live performances ==
Timberlake performed "Cry Me a River" for the first time on an episode of TRL, the same day as the release of Justified. He again performed the song at the 13th annual Billboard Music Awards, held on December 9, 2002, at the MGM Grand Garden Arena in Las Vegas. He was accompanied by a string section and a 20-member choir. He also performed the song on the Justified World Tour (2003–2004), his first worldwide tour. The song was eighth on the set list of the Justified & Stripped Tour (2003), his joint North American tour with Christina Aguilera. Timberlake performed "Cry Me a River" on a promotional concert held at House of Blues in West Hollywood, California on June 17, 2003. He performed a rock-inspired version of the song on Saturday Night Live on October 11, 2003; and it was fourteenth on the set list of his second worldwide tour, FutureSex/LoveShow (2007). During his world tour in Zürich, Switzerland, in August 2007, Timberlake performed "Cry Me a River" and segued into the chorus of "Rehab" by Amy Winehouse.

On October 23, 2010, while performing at the annual charity gig "Justin Timberlake and Friends" in Las Vegas, Timberlake began the show with a slow and "sultry" performance of "Cry Me a River" and segued into a cover of Bill Withers' 1971 single "Ain't No Sunshine". He later resumed "Cry Me a River" before segueing into a cover of Drake's 2010 song "Over". Jillian Mapes of Billboard described the performance as "completely lovely in an effortless sort of way." Timberlake performed "Cry Me a River" at concert he held during the 2013 Super Bowl weekend in New Orleans. On August 25, Timberlake accepted the Michael Jackson Video Vanguard Award at the 2013 MTV Video Music Awards, preceded by a medley of his songs, including "Cry Me a River". Timberlake included the single on the set list of his Legends of the Summer Stadium Tour with rapper Jay-Z (2013), his fifth worldwide concert tour, the 20/20 Experience World Tour (2013–2015), his sixth worldwide concert tour, the Man of the Woods Tour (2018–2019), and his seventh worldwide concert tour, the Forget Tomorrow World Tour (2024–2025).

== Covers ==
The song was first covered by Welsh alternative metal band Lostprophets, recorded in a BBC Radio One session. It appears as a B-side of the single "Last Train Home", released in 2004. American singer-songwriter Taylor Swift performed a cover of "Cry Me a River" in Memphis, Tennessee, during the Speak Now World Tour (2011–12). Justin Bieber recorded a cover of the song together with Kanye West's 2007 single "Stronger", which he posted on his YouTube account. Canadian rock band The Cliks also covered the song for their 2007 album Snakehouse. British singer Leona Lewis covered "Cry Me a River" during her debut concert tour The Labyrinth (2010). The Sheffield Star described the version as a "beautifully, sitting quietly, almost a capella". In 2011 New Zealand band Wellington International Ukulele Orchestra released a cover version on their "I Love You..." EP.

American indie pop duo Jack and White covered the song on their 2012 extended play Undercover. Recording artist Kelly Clarkson covered the song on September 1, 2012, as a fan request during her 2012 Summer Tour with The Fray. In January 2013, American singer Selena Gomez performed an acoustic version of "Cry Me a River" at the UNICEF charity concert in New York City. In February 2015, Scottish synthpop band Chvrches performed a cover of "Cry Me a River" on BBC Radio 1's Live Lounge. The New Jersey alternative metal band 40 Below Summer performed a cover of the song in their 2015 album Transmission Infrared. American Post-Hardcore vocalist Johnny Craig is also well known for his 2009 cover of the song, prior to his first solo album release.

=== In other media ===
In May 2020, Democratic presidential nominee Joe Biden released a campaign ad which took aim at Donald Trump for complaining in a 2020 interview about being "treated worse" by the media than any other president instead of focusing on the ongoing COVID-19 pandemic. The ad was soundtracked by "Cry Me a River".

== Influence ==
"[The song] is the universal symbol of the bad celebrity break-up – more powerful than a stack of Angelina vs. Aniston tabloid covers, more effective than an official statement mailed to People magazine."

— Ottawa Citizen's Leah Collins following Selena Gomez's cover in 2013.

"Cry Me a River" marked the first collaboration between Timberlake and Timbaland, and its critical and commercial success started "one of the most forward-thinking star-producer duos in pop music", as described by Variety's author Andrew Barker. Alternative rock band Coldplay revealed that the single was an inspiration for the drumbeat of their song "Lost!". Rock singer Marilyn Manson cited it as one of the main songs that influenced him. In order to use the song in the 2017 film Lady Bird set in 2003, director Greta Gerwig sent a letter to Timberlake, "Your album Justified was that year, and it owned that year."

Rosalía samples the chorus from "Cry Me a River" for her song "Bagdad" on her album El mal querer (2018), featuring a Barcelona children's choir. Billboard deemed the track "a transcultural re-interpretation" of "Cry Me a River". Halsey's song "Without Me" contains an interpolation of the pre-chorus of "Cry Me a River".

"Cry Me a River" was also the title of a 1953 song written by Arthur Hamilton and made famous by Julie London in 1955. According to The Wall Street Journal, Hamilton was the originator of the phrase "cry me a river" borrowed in Timberlake's song.

== Track listings ==
- 12-inch single
1. "Cry Me a River" (Dirty Vegas vocal mix) – 8:11
2. "Cry Me a River" (Bill Hamel Justinough vocal remix) – 7:43
3. "Cry Me a River" (Johny Fiasco mix) – 7:56
- Germany maxi single
1. "Cry Me a River" – 4:48
2. "Cry Me a River" (Dirty Vegas vocal mix) – 8:11
3. "Cry Me a River" (Bill Hamel Justinough vocal remix) – 7:43
4. "Like I Love You" (Basement Jaxx vocal mix) – 6:04
- UK maxi single
1. "Cry Me a River" – 4:48
2. "Cry Me a River" (Dirty Vegas vocal mix) – 8:11
3. "Cry Me a River" (Bill Hamel vocal remix) – 7:43
- Canada maxi single
1. "Cry Me a River" (Johny Fiasco mix) – 7:56
2. "Like I Love You" (Basement Jaxx vocal mix) – 6:04
3. "Like I Love You" (Deep Dish Zigzag remix) – 9:40
- US maxi single
1. "Cry Me a River" – 4:48
2. "Cry Me a River" (instrumental version) – 4:48
3. "Cry Me a River" (Dirty Vegas vocal mix) – 8:11
4. "Cry Me A River" (Junior's Vasquez Earth club mix) – 6:43
5. "Like I Love You" (Basement Jaxx vocal mix) – 6:04
6. "Like I Love You" (Deep Dish Zigzag remix) – 9:40

== Credits and personnel ==
Credits are adapted from the liner notes of Justified.

Recording and mixing

- Recorded at Westlake Recording Studios (Los Angeles, California)
- Strings recorded at The Studio (Philadelphia, Pennsylvania)
- Mixed at Manhattan Center Studios (New York City)

Personnel

- Songwriting – Justin Timberlake, Timothy Mosley, Scott Storch
- Production – Timbaland
- Recording – Senator Jimmy D
- Assistant engineer – Carlos "Storm" Martinez
- Mixing – Jimmy Douglass, Timbaland
- Mixing assistant – "Steamy"
- String arrangement and conducting – Larry Gold
- Background vocals – Justin Timberlake, Timbaland, Marsha Ambrosius, Tyrone Tribbett, Greater Anointing
- Clavinet – Scott Storch
- Guitar – Bill Pettaway
- Vocal arrangement – Justin Timberlake

== Charts ==
=== Weekly charts ===
2003 weekly chart performance for "Cry Me a River"
Chart (2003)	Peak position
Australia (ARIA)	2
Australian Urban (ARIA)	3
Austria (Ö3 Austria Top 40)	29
Belgium (Ultratop 50 Flanders)	7
Belgium (Ultratop 50 Wallonia)	5
Canada (Nielsen SoundScan)	40
Canada CHR (Nielsen BDS)	3
Croatia (HRT)	4
Denmark (Tracklisten)	11
Europe (Eurochart Hot 100)	4
Finland (Suomen virallinen lista)	19
France (SNEP)	6
Germany (GfK)	13
Greece (IFPI)	11
Hungary (Single Top 40)	6
Ireland (IRMA)	6
Italy (FIMI)	14
Netherlands (Dutch Top 40)	7
Netherlands (Single Top 100)	6
New Zealand (Recorded Music NZ)	11
Norway (VG-lista)	10
Poland Airplay (Music & Media)	14
Romania (Romanian Top 100)	16
Scottish Singles Sales (Official Charts)	3
Sweden (Sverigetopplistan)	10
Switzerland (Schweizer Hitparade)	20
UK Singles (Official Charts)	2
UK Airplay (Music Week)	2
UK Indie (Official Charts)	1
UK Hip Hop/R&B (Official Charts)	1
US Billboard Hot 100	3
US Dance Club Songs (Billboard) Remixes	2
US Dance Singles Sales (Billboard) Dirty Vegas, J. Fiasco & B. Hamel Mixes	1
US Hot R&B/Hip-Hop Songs (Billboard)	11
US Pop Airplay (Billboard)	3
US Rhythmic Airplay (Billboard)	9

2013 weekly chart performance for "Cry Me a River"
Chart (2013)	Peak position
Canada (Nielsen SoundScan)	43

=== Year-end charts ===
Year-end chart performance for "Cry Me a River"
Chart (2003)	Position
Australia (ARIA)	54
Belgium (Ultratop 50 Flanders)	60
Belgium (Ultratop 50 Wallonia)	33
France (SNEP)	50
Ireland (IRMA)	36
Netherlands (Dutch Top 40)	56
Netherlands (Single Top 100)	61
Sweden (Hitlistan)	72
UK Singles (OCC)	29
UK Airplay (Music Week)	14
US Billboard Hot 100	30
US Dance Club Play (Billboard)	10
US Dance Singles Sales (Billboard)	4
US Hot R&B/Hip-Hop Singles & Tracks (Billboard)	75
US Mainstream Top 40 (Billboard)	17
US Rhythmic Top 40 (Billboard)	51

== Certifications ==
Certifications and sales for "Cry Me a River"
Region	Certification	Certified units/sales
Australia (ARIA)	2× Platinum	140,000^{‡}
Brazil (Pro-Música Brasil)	Platinum	60,000^{‡}
Denmark (IFPI Danmark)	Platinum	90,000^{‡}
France (SNEP)	Silver	125,000^{*}
Germany (BVMI)	Gold	250,000^{‡}
Italy (FIMI)	Gold	25,000^{‡}
New Zealand (RMNZ)	3× Platinum	90,000^{‡}
Spain (Promusicae)	Gold	30,000^{‡}
United Kingdom (BPI)	2× Platinum	1,200,000^{‡}
United States (RIAA)	—	1,200,000
^{*} Sales figures based on certification alone.^{‡} Sales+streaming figures based on certification alone.

== Radio and release history ==
Release dates and formats for "Cry Me a River"
Region	Release date	Format(s)	Label(s)	Ref(s).
United States	November 25, 2002	Contemporary hit radio; rhythmic contemporary radio	Jive	
Germany	December 23, 2002	12-inch vinyl	Jive	
United States	December 23, 2002	12-inch vinyl	Jive	
United States	January 6, 2003	Urban contemporary radio	Jive	
Germany	January 27, 2003	Maxi single	Jive	
United Kingdom	February 3, 2003	CD single, 12-inch vinyl, cassette single	Jive	
United States	February 18, 2003	Maxi single	Jive	
Australia	February 24, 2003	CD single	Jive	
France	March 31, 2003	CD single, maxi single	Jive	
