= FutureSex/LoveShow: Live from Madison Square Garden =

Video by Justin Timberlake
- Released: November 19, 2007
- Recorded: August 16, 2007
- Venues: Madison Square Garden, New York City, United States
- Genre: Pop
- Length: 144:00
- Labels: Jive, Zomba
- Director: Marty Callner
- Producers: Justin Timberlake, Marty Callner, Randall Gladstein, Louis Muckle, Sonia Muckle, Johnny Wright

Justin Timberlake chronology
| Justin Timberlake: Live from London (2003) | FutureSex/LoveShow: Live from Madison Square Garden (2007) |

FutureSex/LoveShow: Live from Madison Square Garden is the second live video album by American singer-songwriter Justin Timberlake. It was released on November 19, 2007, by Jive Records.

== Background ==
In May 2007, it was announced that Timberlake signed a deal with the premium television network HBO to broadcast the live concert. Timberlake previously appeared on an HBO special, which aired the *NSYNC Live From Madison Square Garden concert in 2000. FutureSex/LoveShow was taped on the second night at the Madison Square Garden on August 16, 2007. The footage was broadcast by HBO on September 3, 2007, and later on September 6 due to demand. On November 20, 2007, a two-disc edition of FutureSex/LoveShow: Live from Madison Square Garden was released on DVD and Blu-ray formats that were sold exclusively by the retailer Best Buy. The release included extra footage, including a song-by-song commentary by Timberlake and pre- and post-show clips.

At the 60th Primetime Creative Arts Emmy Awards in 2008, the broadcast won the award for Outstanding Picture Editing for a Special (Single or Multi-Camera). For Timberlake's performance of "What Goes Around... Comes Around" at the Madison Square Garden, Josh Tyrangiel of Time magazine ranked it second on its list of top ten live performances in 2007. Tyrangiel wrote: "It's a little on the long side, but Timberlake earns this symphonic take on What Goes Around from his HBO special". On October 31, 2007, Billboard magazine announced the finalists for the 2007 Billboard Touring Awards, which was based on actual box-office performance from January 1, 2007, to September 30, 2007. Timberlake was nominated in the categories Top Tour, Top Draw and Breakthrough Artist; he won the latter that was announced during the awards show on November 15, 2007.

== Track listing ==
DVD
| No. | Title | Length |
|---|---|---|
| 1. | "Opening Conversation" |
| 2. | "FutureSex/LoveSound" |
| 3. | "Like I Love You" |
| 4. | "My Love" |
| 5. | "Señorita" |
| 6. | "Sexy Ladies" |
| 7. | "Until the End of Time" |
| 8. | "What Goes Around... Comes Around" |
| 9. | "Chop Me Up" |
| 10. | "Intermission: JT & Timbaland" |
| 11. | "Rock Your Body" |
| 12. | "Medley: "Gone" / "Take It From Here" / "Last Night" |
| 13. | "Damn Girl" |
| 14. | "Summer Love" |
| 15. | "Losing My Way" |
| 16. | "Cry Me a River" |
| 17. | "LoveStoned" |
| 18. | "SexyBack" |
| 19. | "(Another Song) All Over Again" |
| 20. | "Goodnights & Credits" |

Bonus Disc
| No. | Title | Length |
|---|---|---|
| 21. | "The Making of FutureSex/LoveShow" |
| 22. | "Open Mic" |
| 23. | "1 On 1 With JT" |
| 24. | "Under The Stage" |
| 25. | "Bonus video track: "LoveStoned (Justice Re-Mix)" |
| 26. | "DVD Credits" |

== Charts ==
| Charts (2007) | Peak position |
|---|---|
| Japan DVD Chart (Oricon) | 244 |
| Sweden DVDs Top 20 (Sverigetopplistan) | 4 |
| US Music DVD Chart (Billboard) | 4 |

== Certifications ==
| Region | Certification | Certified units/sales |
|---|---|---|
| Australia (ARIA) | 9× Platinum | 135,000^{^} |
| Brazil (Pro-Música Brasil) | Gold | 15,000^{*} |
| France (SNEP) | Platinum | 20,000^{*} |
| New Zealand (RMNZ) | 2× Platinum | 10,000^{^} |
| Poland (ZPAV) | Gold | 5,000^{*} |
| United Kingdom (BPI) | Gold | 25,000^{^} |
| United States (RIAA) | 5× Platinum | 500,000^{^} |
^{*} Sales figures based on certification alone.^{^} Shipments figures based on certification alone.

== Release history ==
| Country | Date | Format | Label | Ref. |
|---|---|---|---|---|
| United Kingdom | November 19, 2007 | DVD | RCA | |
| Germany | November 23, 2007 | DVD | Sony | |
| United States | November 23, 2007 | DVD (Best Buy exclusive) | Jive | |
| Japan | December 19, 2007 | DVD | Sony | |
| Germany | February 7, 2008 | Blu-ray | Sony | |
| United Kingdom | February 11, 2008 | Blu-ray | RCA | |
| Canada | April 1, 2008 | Blu-ray | Sony | |
| Canada | April 1, 2008 | DVD | Sony | |
| United States | April 1, 2008 | Blu-ray | Jive | |
| United States | April 1, 2008 | DVD | Jive | |
