= FutureSex/LoveSounds =

2006 studio album by Justin Timberlake

- Standard edition cover

Studio album by Justin Timberlake
- Released: September 8, 2006
- Recorded: November 2005 – July 2006
- Studios: Akademie Mathematique of Philosophical Sound Research (Los Angeles); Arch Angel (Los Angeles); Capitol (Hollywood); Chung King Studios (New York City); Conway (Hollywood); The Document Room (Malibu); Encore (Burbank); The Studio (Philadelphia); Thomas Crown Studios (Virginia Beach)
- Genres: R&B; electro-funk; art pop; disco; dance-pop
- Length: 66:12
- Labels: Jive; Zomba
- Producers: Justin Timberlake; Timbaland; Danja; Jawbreakers; Rick Rubin

Justin Timberlake chronology
Justin & Christina (2003)	FutureSex/LoveSounds (2006)	The 20/20 Experience (2013)

Alternative cover
- Deluxe edition cover

Singles from FutureSex/LoveSounds
- 1. "SexyBack" Released: August 18, 2006; 2. "My Love" Released: October 24, 2006; 3. "What Goes Around... Comes Around" Released: December 19, 2006; 4. "Summer Love" Released: April 10, 2007; 5. "LoveStoned" Released: June 29, 2007; 6. "Until the End of Time" Released: October 3, 2007

FutureSex/LoveSounds is the second studio album by American singer Justin Timberlake, released on September 8, 2006, by Jive Records and Zomba. Following a three-year writing hiatus, Timberlake conceived the album in collaboration with producer Timbaland and the latter's colleague Danja primarily at Timbaland's Thomas Crown Studios. By comparison with Timberlake's debut album Justified (2002), FutureSex/LoveSounds was influenced by a wider range of genres including techno, electro-funk, trance, and rock. It features reprises and interludes interspersed with the album's full songs.

FutureSex/LoveSounds received mostly positive reviews from critics, who noted its wide range of influences and eclectic sound. The album produced six singles that attained chart success; including US Billboard Hot 100 number-one singles: "SexyBack", "My Love", and "What Goes Around... Comes Around". With "Summer Love", the album achieved four US Mainstream Top 40 number-one songs. Many music publications considered it among the best albums of the 2000s. Aside from earning numerous best-of-the-decade lists, the album received several Grammy Award nominations, including Album of the Year and Best Pop Vocal Album, while its singles won in their respective categories. It has been certified multi-platinum in many countries worldwide, and has sold over 10 million copies, with seven million in the United States.

The album has been added to the Rock and Roll Hall of Fame's musical library and archive. It is also considered by critics and fans to be one of Timberlake's best albums to date. To further promote the album, Timberlake embarked on his second concert tour, entitled FutureSex/LoveShow, which became one of the highest-grossing tours in 2007.

== Background ==
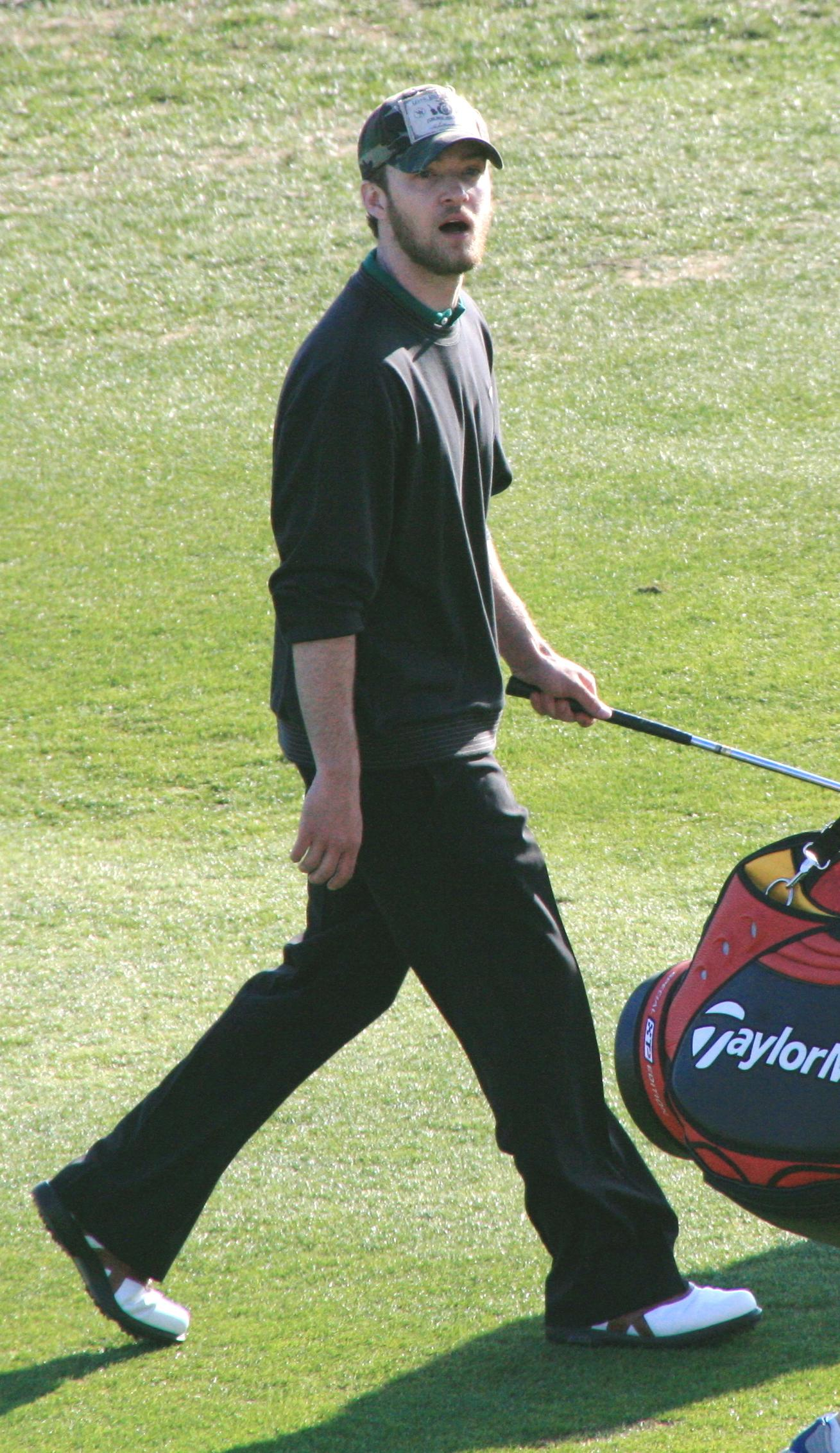
Timberlake in 2006

In November 2002, Timberlake released his debut solo album, Justified, which was a commercial success and received generally positive reviews from music critics. The album spawned four singles, including the US top-five singles "Rock Your Body" and "Cry Me a River". "Cry Me a River" in particular was credited for having helped the album sell and peak on the music charts. Justified ended selling four million copies in the United States alone. Although the album established Timberlake's career outside his then-band NSYNC, Timberlake (who was 22 years old at the time), was "at a crossroads" and felt he was at the stage of being "burnt out", and thought he had lost his voice "in regards to knowing what (and how) he wanted to sing". Timberlake stated that Justified had been years in the making, and a record that would re-create its success would be a challenge he was not ready to take.

In the following years, Timberlake took a partial hiatus from the music industry. His being "burnt out" partly caused him to try acting in films. In October 2003, he hosted and was the guest musician on the late-night variety show Saturday Night Live, where he showcased his acting potential. He also paired with American actor Jimmy Fallon on The Barry Gibb Talk Show. After the show, Timberlake was reportedly "inundated" with acting offers, which he readily accepted, partly because he needed inspiration and did not want to pass up the opportunities. Before returning to music, Timberlake shot four films; including Edison Force (2005) and Alpha Dog (2006). Timberlake opted not to pursue the reunion with *NSYNC, which he considered after Justified. According to him, he was concerned with how they would reinvent their music. In late 2004, Timberlake then contacted record producers Rich Harrison and Rodney Jerkins, who had produced songs for *NSYNC. Both producers were "impressed" by the live band-driven late-night shows Timberlake had participated in and wanted to incorporate this in his music.

== Recording ==
We had no direction at all ... other than "Cry Me a River", and not in the sense of mimicking the track, but in how big the song was. There was no direction for how he wanted the song to sound, because there was no direction for how he wanted [FutureSex/LoveSounds] to sound.

— producer Danja speaking to MTV News

In 2005, Timberlake felt inspired to record songs again. Motivated by the "sad state" of pop radio, he decided he needed to experiment with music. Reportedly, it was not until Timberlake turned to producer Timbaland "that he figured out the direction he wanted the record to take". In November 2005, Timberlake visited Timbaland's brand-new Thomas Crown Studios in Virginia Beach, Virginia, United States. Timbaland had previously collaborated with Timberlake, producing four tracks for Justified including "Cry Me a River".

Once in the studio, however, the team had no clear direction for the album, as no concepts were being discussed. Aside from having "Cry Me a River" to draw from, they had no "game plan" and no working title for the new album. Timberlake thought that if he could make a record that would live up to Justified, he "would have", so he asked Timbaland if he could reproduce the likes of "Cry Me a River" four or six times.

While in the studio, Timbaland played on the stereo plenty of songs by American singer and musician Prince for them to listen to. Early in their sessions, they reportedly were "fooling around" and "freestyling". One night, Danja was playing a guitar riff and caught the attention of Timberlake, who then started humming to the melody and later sang the lyrics. Timbaland, who was at their side, added drums to the progressing sound. After an hour, with no lyrics written on paper, Timberlake recorded in the vocal booth a song that would become "What Goes Around... Comes Around". Timberlake, having been teased by Timbaland, said to the latter: "Let's do something we would never do. Let's go far left and just see what happens."

== Production ==
Official production for FutureSex/LoveSounds started in December 2005. When production began, Jive Records Chairman and CEO, Barry Weiss, asked when the album would be completed, to which Timberlake replied that it could take a year. The title was not finalized until Jive Records gave Timberlake a deadline on finishing what would become FutureSex/LoveSounds. The collective thought the album was comparable to Michael Jackson's landmark record, Thriller, nicknaming it "Thriller 2006".

According to Timberlake, FutureSex/LoveSounds is like a "fashion editorial, YSL and Gucci suits, which goes with the sonics". The album's artworks were shot by American fashion photographer Terry Richardson. The cover features Timberlake stomping a disco ball using his black pointy shoe.

Timbaland guested on several dates on Timberlake's 2007 FutureSex/LoveShow worldwide concert tour. Timbaland, his protégé Danja, and Timberlake wrote and produced a majority of tracks that appeared on the album.

For his new project, Timberlake collaborated with only a few producers. With no concrete plans, however, Timberlake's goal for the album was "'to capture moments' with a vivid, raw, off-the-cuff sound". Timberlake, who included record production in his repertoire, managed the recording sessions with no formula. His sessions with Timbaland and Danja were described as free-flowing, and he referred to themselves in the process as "looking like [mad men], a mad scientist".

In his collaboration with Timbaland, Timberlake asserted that they "have a very interesting connection" in music. In ten days, they composed at least eight to ten songs with the lyrics, melodies, and vocals all in place. In three weeks, after that transitional moment with "What Goes Around... Comes Around", the collective was able to produce songs like "My Love", "SexyBack", and "Sexy Ladies". Unlike Justified which was recorded in six weeks, Timberlake said that FutureSex/LoveSounds took one year to complete.

Sessions for the album also saw Timberlake collaborating with Rick Rubin and will.i.am, the latter himself a member of the hip hop group The Black Eyed Peas, whose 2003 single "Where Is the Love?" Timberlake lent vocals to. For the production, they are credited as Jawbreakers, a production team of their own established during their collaboration for The Black Eyed Peas' album. Four songs were produced with will.i.am, although only "Damn Girl" made it to the standard edition of the album.

Actor Chris Rock recommended producer Rubin to Timberlake, who considered the idea and discussed it with Rubin when he saw him at a music festival in Coachella, California. Timberlake went to singer-songwriter Neil Diamond's studio, where Rubin played him some demos, one of which was a ballad that would become "(Another Song) All Over Again". Timberlake suggested that the collaboration was meant to "do the anti-whatever-you-want-to-call-it that [Timbaland and] I came up with".

== Music ==
During the production of FutureSex/LoveSounds, Timberlake was interested in rock music. This inspiration was used in his approach to recording the songs, rather than in composing them. Timberlake reveals, "I wanted to sing the song like a rock and roll singer, not an R&B singer." On the influences he drew from, he said that if Justified was "characterized" by Michael Jackson and Stevie Wonder, FutureSex/LoveSounds is more like David Bowie and Prince. AllMusic stated that Timbaland spends much of the album "refurbishing the electro-funk of Prince's early-'80s recordings," adding that "Justin marries his innuendos to grinding, squealing synths that conjure the funky spirit of the Minneapolis Sound. Other influences include late INXS-frontman Michael Hutchence, Arcade Fire, David Byrne, The Killers, The Strokes, and Radiohead.

Although Timberlake expressed interest in recording songs with rock influences, Timbaland was initially reluctant to pursue the idea because he was not accustomed to producing such music. Nonetheless, he suggested that they could produce a handful, since they were afraid of alienating Timberlake's urban fan base. Because of this concern, they produced several reprises, encores, and preludes with a rock influence, instead of full-length songs. As to the sound of FutureSex/LoveSounds, "My Love", the second song composed, steered the album's direction. Danja revealed that it "changed the whole album", and the energy derived from the song was sustained throughout the process. On his inspiration for the infusion of R&B with trance on the album, Danja remembers:

I heard dance and techno and was always interested in it but didn't really know where to go. But I went to a club one night and saw that people were losing their mind to these dance tracks. It wasn't really that I wanted to mimic that sound. I just wanted to have that energy and have people going crazy. So I knew the fusion was putting R&B with trance.

Unlike his previous record, which focused on R&B and pop music, FutureSex/LoveSounds is less concentrated on one particular sound. Timberlake explains, "It's more broad as far as the styles I wanted to mix in to my own type of thing." The musically "complex" album has been described as R&B, electro-funk, art pop,"modern day" disco and dance-pop with elements of hip-hop, rock, funk, soul, gospel, new wave, opera, and world music. Entertainment Weekly noted that the album's sound is a "sonic departure" from both *NSYNC and Justified. Although "What Goes Around" sounds similar to Justified, Timberlake admitted that it is the only song on the album to have such similarity.

Critics noted that the influences and styles are varied across the album's track list. The title track "FutureSex/LoveSound" incorporates early 1980s new wave and industrial rock. The song "Sexy Ladies" takes on Minneapolis funk. Another funk song on the album is the lead single "SexyBack", the style of which is described by Timberlake as "club funk". Meanwhile, the track "Damn Girl", which was produced by the Jawbreakers, incorporates '60s soul music. Gospel music is infused in "Losing My Way", which is the only song on the album that features choir arrangement.

== Lyrics ==
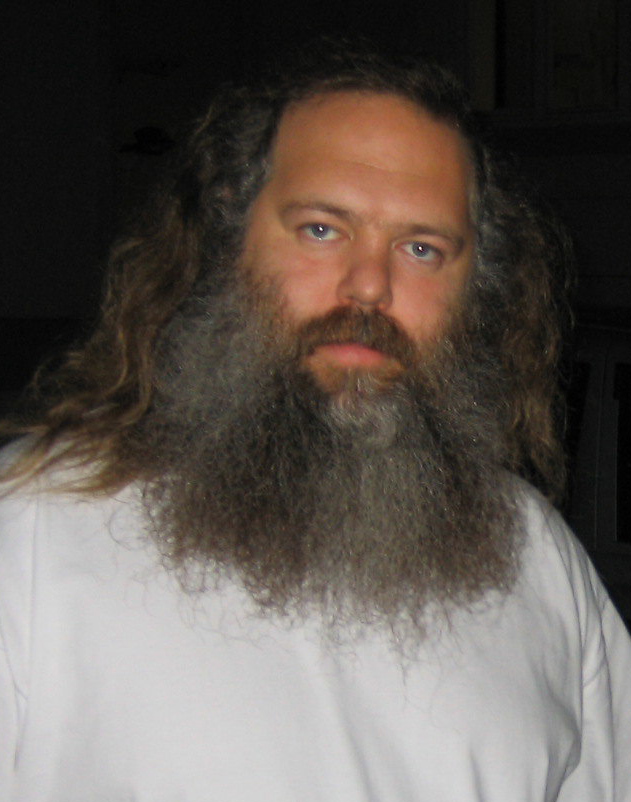
Rick Rubin produced "(Another Song) All Over Again", the only song on the album that was written on paper.

Most of the songs' lyrics were not written down on paper, as Timberlake believed it would only slow him down. For most of the album's production, Timberlake composed the lyrics in his head and would record the song shortly after. Some songs were conceptualized within a relatively shorter time, while others took longer because Timberlake had wanted to incorporate variation. For instance, the lyrics to "Losing My Way" were in a narrative style, which took Timberlake longer to write. The only song that Timberlake wrote down on paper was the Rick Rubin-produced "(Another Song) All Over Again". Rubin felt it was unusual for Timberlake because he requested the latter to write the lyrics first instead of recording them directly in the vocal booth.

Sharing common themes with Justified, FutureSex/LoveSounds contains songs that are thematically based on and, according to Timberlake, were motivated by sex and love. MTV editor Jennifer Vineyard summarizes that the album illustrates "the very nature of how sex and love are interchangeable and immutable and contradictory and complementary all at once". The first half of the album, FutureSex, generally focuses on themes about sex that are evident on songs like the title track "FutureSex/LoveSound", "LoveStoned", "Damn Girl" and "Sexy Ladies". The second half, LoveSounds, is the album's "sweet side", encompassing songs such as "My Love", the slow jam "Until the End of Time" and "What Goes Around... Comes Around". Meanwhile, "LoveStoned" transitions to the two-minute prelude "I Think She Knows".

Although themes of sex and love are dominant on the album, the song "Losing My Way" diverges to a more serious topic, which was inspired by a documentary of crystal meth addiction that Timberlake watched. Meanwhile, "(Another Song) All Over Again" is a homage to soul musician Donny Hathaway, according to Timberlake. The lyrics to "What Goes Around... Comes Around" are thought to have a similar meaning to "Cry Me a River". In an interview, he revealed that the song was based on one of his friends' experiences. "My Love" was also noted as "arguably" similar to "Cry Me a River". Timberlake, however, confirmed in many interviews that the record is not autobiographical, although he himself had an experience from which to draw.

== Release and promotion ==
FutureSex/LoveSounds was released worldwide on September 13, 2006. More than a year after its initial release, a deluxe edition of the album was issued on November 27, 2007. This edition contains three additional tracks on the album, each featuring guest artist. One of the tracks is a re-recording of "Until the End of Time", now a duet between Timberlake and American R&B singer Beyoncé. Also included with the Deluxe Edition is a bonus DVD, which contains footage from Timberlake's live performances and behind-the-scenes on the music videos of four singles, including "SexyBack" and "What Goes Around... Comes Around". The main album included with the Deluxe Edition is the edited version, and an explicit version was not issued.

According to Billboard magazine, Jive's mother company Sony BMG offered 71 distinct products to tie in with FutureSex/LoveSounds. This was an attempt at finding solutions to declining sales in physical albums, and Timberlake's album was among those offered in various configurations and versions. Aside from the album itself, the project included digital versions, ringtones, wallpapers, and individual tracks.

Before, an artist's release was made available in fewer than ten formats. In recent years, however, versioning strategies have been increasingly applied to the recording industry. In the 2010 book The Music Industry: Music in the Cloud which examines such context, author Patrik Wikström noted FutureSex/LoveSounds as one "high-profile" example. From the project, a total of 115 versions or products have been sold. According to the International Federation of the Phonographic Industry (IFPI), the project has sold as of 2008 more than 19 million units worldwide, 20 percent of which were sales on CD format.

=== Singles ===
Six major singles were issued from the album, led by "SexyBack" which was released on July 7, 2006, two months before the publication of the album. Regarding the song, Timberlake surmised he did not sound like he did before. "SexyBack", which lacks his distinctive falsetto, is seen as a complete departure from Timberlake's recognized sound, and his management thought it might risk being unrecognizable as a "Justin Timberlake song". But that risk nonetheless appealed to Timberlake, who reportedly insisted to have "SexyBack" released as the album's lead single. Jive Records executive Barry Weiss, who initially doubted the suggestion, later told in an interview in February 2007 that albeit an "unusual record", it was a "risk that clearly paid off".

"SexyBack" was followed by the release of "My Love" in the third quarter of 2006, and "What Goes Around... Comes Around" in early January 2007. The single releases for the standard edition of the album spanned a year, during which time the fourth single, "LoveStoned/I Think She Knows", was released. When the deluxe edition was issued, the duet version of "Until the End of Time" was also released in the same month. The single version includes as its B-side the "Set the Mood (Prelude)", which is juxtaposed with "Summer Love" in the album's track listing. The European release of "Until the End of Time" omits "Set the Mood (Prelude)" and instead includes "Summer Love" as a double A-side.

Commercially, the album's first three singles have been the most successful in the domestic music market. They each peaked at number one on the US Billboard Hot 100, giving Timberlake credit as the only artist to achieve such feat since R&B singer Usher accomplished four chart-topping singles between February and December 2004. "SexyBack" and "My Love" have since been certified multi-platinum by the Recording Industry Association of America (RIAA), an achievement that was seen as "rare" amidst free file-sharing in the Internet, which had made reaching the million mark in sales a struggle in the music industry.

=== Tour ===
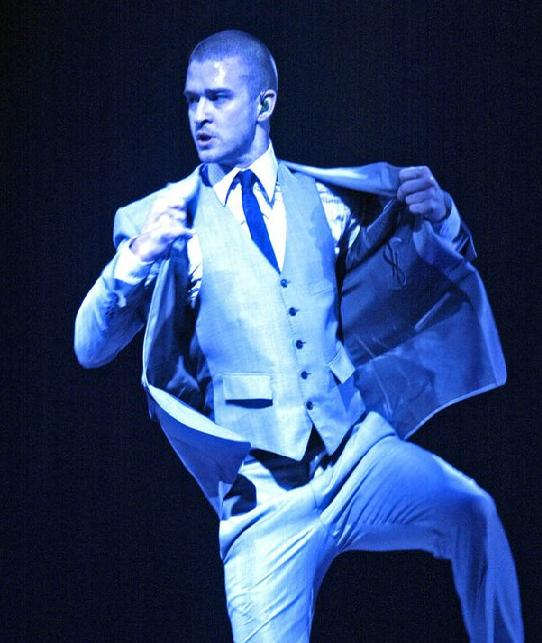
Timberlake performing at St. Paul, Minnesota, one of the venues of his first worldwide tour, the FutureSex/LoveShow

In support of the album, Timberlake embarked on the FutureSex/LoveShow, his first concert tour on a global scale. Promoted primarily by AEG Live, the concert tour reached North America, Europe, Asia, and Oceania, with 119 venues in total. It began on January 8, 2007, in San Diego, California, and culminated in Abu Dhabi, United Arab Emirates, on December 6, 2007. FutureSex/LoveShow, which drew 1.6 million people worldwide, grossed a total of US$126.8 million, the third top-grossing concert tour in 2007.

In May 2007, it was announced that Timberlake signed a deal with the HBO network to broadcast the live concert. Timberlake previously appeared on an HBO special, which aired the *NSYNC Live From Madison Square Garden concert in 2000. FutureSex/LoveShow was taped on the second night at the Madison Square Garden on August 16, 2007. The footage was broadcast by HBO on September 3, 2007, and later on September 6 due to demand. On November 20, 2007, a two-disc edition of FutureSex/LoveShow: Live from Madison Square Garden was released on DVD and Blu-ray formats that were sold exclusively by the retailer Best Buy. The release included extra footage, including a song-by-song commentary by Timberlake and pre- and post-show clips.

In 2008, the broadcast earned Timberlake an Emmy Award in the category Outstanding Picture Editing For A Special (Single Or Multi-Camera). For Timberlake's performance of "What Goes Around... Comes Around" at the Madison Square Garden, Josh Tyrangiel of Time magazine ranked it second on its list of top ten live performances in 2007. Tyrangiel writes, "It's a little on the long side, but Timberlake earns this symphonic take on What Goes Around from his HBO special." On October 31, 2007, Billboard magazine announced the finalists for the 2007 Billboard Touring Awards, which was based on actual box-office performance from January 1, 2007, to September 30, 2007. Timberlake was nominated in the categories Top Tour, Top Draw and Breakthrough Artist; he won the latter that was announced during the awards show on November 15, 2007.

== Critical reception ==
Professional ratings
Aggregate scores
Source	Rating
Metacritic	70/100
Review scores
Source	Rating
AllMusic	4/5 stars
Blender	4/5 stars
Entertainment Weekly	B−
The Guardian	3/5 stars
Los Angeles Times	3.5/4 stars
NME	8/10
Pitchfork	8.1/10
Q	3/5 stars
Rolling Stone	3.5/5 stars
Uncut	3/5 stars

FutureSex/LoveSounds was met with generally positive reviews from critics. At Metacritic, which assigns a normalized rating out of 100 to reviews from mainstream publications, the album received an average score of 70, based on 25 reviews. Torque commended Timberlake for "manag[ing] to surprise with an eclectic collection of sounds, and in a good way". Katy Kroll of Billboard noted the album's sound as a "bit different, but the music's sex appeal remains a force to be reckoned with". Ann Powers of the Los Angeles Times suggested that the album is not "an easy listen at first", but "repeated listening helps the tunes unravel". AllMusic senior editor Stephen Thomas Erlewine commended Timberlake's "clear musical vision" and stated that the "serious undercurrent" of several songs on the album, "when combined with Timbaland's retro-future production makes FutureSex/LoveSounds fascinating." Kelefa Sanneh of The New York Times stated, "How well do Mr. Timberlake and Timbaland work together? So well that they can make even the world's most irritating percussion instrument, the human beatbox, sound pretty good." He also took notice of the album's preludes and interludes, writing, "Timbaland has long been known for hiding little surprises near the end of songs, and here he takes his obsession with transformation to new heights."

In a mixed review, Uncut magazine found the album "laudable, but overreaching". Vibe felt that Timberlake and Timbaland's songwriting is "frustratingly awkward". Alexis Petridis, writing for The Guardian, said that the album "almost works: close, but no enema". Ben Williams of New York magazine commented that Timberlake is "better at being sappy than sexy" and concluded, "If he hasn't yet invented a persona intriguing enough to live up to his music, give him credit for being one of the few white men still brave enough to make black music." Robert Christgau of Rolling Stone found Timberlake's "best new" songs "thrilling", although "some of the up-tempo stuff flirts with mechanical muscle-flexing" and "Losing My Way" is a "well-meaning" but "clueless embarrassment." In his consumer guide for MSN Music, he cited "My Love" and "SexyBack" as highlights and gave the album a three-star honorable mention, indicating "an enjoyable effort consumers attuned to its overriding aesthetic or individual vision may well treasure".

=== Accolades ===
The album earned numerous best-of lists in 2006 and the following years. Music magazine Rolling Stone listed FutureSex/LoveSounds as their 26th among 2006's top 50 albums of the year. On the British newspaper The Observer, the album made it at number 47 on the publication's list best 50 albums of 2006. On the general publication Time, the album is ranked eighth among its list of ten best albums in 2006. The publication notes that Timberlake "levitates into a falsetto that honors Prince and Michael Jackson without stealing from them".

FutureSex/LoveSounds earned numerous best-of-the-decade lists. Rolling Stone ranked it 46th on their top 100 albums of the 2000s, calling it "an avant-garde sprawl of abstract electronica and hallucinatory space funk". Entertainment Weekly ranked the album at number nine on their list of 10 best albums of the decade. It says that FutureSex/LoveSounds is an album that "redefined pop's cutting edge". Earlier in 2008, the album made it at number 31 on the magazine's 100 new classics in music. The album received additional acclaim from Pitchfork and Slant Magazine, ranking the album at number 79 and 49 on their respective "Best of the 2000s" lists. In 2013, Vibe named it the greatest album of the 2000s and ranked it at number five on their list of "The Greatest 50 Albums Since '93". In 2015, Spin made a list of the 300 best albums of the past 30 years (1985–2014), ranking the album at number 101.

== Awards ==
In 2007, the album received four nominations at the Grammy Awards, including Album of the Year and Pop Vocal Album. Timberlake lost the two; however, he won Best Dance Recording for "SexyBack" and Best Rap/Sung Collaboration for "My Love", featuring rapper T.I. The following year at the Grammys, "What Goes Around... Comes Around" was nominated for Record of the Year; Timberlake won Best Male Pop Vocal Performance for the same song and another Best Dance Recording for "LoveStoned/I Think She Knows (Interlude)". In 2007, Timberlake was nominated for seven categories at the MTV Video Music Awards, winning four, including Artist of the Year. He also earned the Quadruple Threat Award, an accolade that recognizes those artists who have excelled in multiple media, including music, fashion, and acting. For the album, Timberlake won Favorite Pop/Rock Male Artist, Favorite Pop/Rock Album and Favorite Soul/R&B Album at the American Music Awards of 2007. For the album and its singles, Timberlake won World's Best Selling American Artist and World's Best Selling Pop Male Artist at the 2007 World Music Awards. It also won Foreign Album of the Year at the Danish Music Awards and was awarded IFPI Hong Kong Top Sales Music Award for Ten Best Sales Releases, Foreign.

Among others, it was nominated for International Album of the Year at the Juno Awards, Album of the Year at the MTV Australia Awards, International Album of the Year at the NRJ Music Awards, and International Album at the Brit Awards. In the two latter he won their awards for International Male Artist of the Year.

== Commercial performance ==
Fueled by its lead single "SexyBack", FutureSex/LoveSounds sold more than 684,000 copies in its first week, debuting at No. 1 on the Billboard 200, the official US albums chart. It became Timberlake's first number-one album as a solo artist. The album has sold over seven million units in the United States, and has been certified seven-times platinum by the Recording Industry Association of America (RIAA). FutureSex/LoveSounds became the eighteenth best-selling album of 2006 in the United States. As of 2018, the album has accumulated 6.49 million album-equivalent units in the country, combining sales (4.7 million copies sold) and equivalent streams.

Internationally, the album was also well received, selling almost equal units and topping many charts worldwide. Sony BMG distinguished FutureSex/LoveSounds as the biggest-selling album among the record company's releases in 2006. Weiss noted that in the past three to five years before the album's release, American artists found it increasingly hard to achieve commercial success in international music markets. He found that Timberlake was among those few "that successfully sells in every country around the world". According to MTV, the album has since sold more than 10 million units worldwide.

In the United Kingdom, the album debuted at number one. FutureSex/LoveSounds became the biggest pre-order album in iTunes history, breaking the all-time record for one week digital sales previously held by the English alternative rock band Coldplay. Elsewhere in Europe, the album debuted at number one in Ireland, and opened at number two in Sweden and Switzerland. In Australia, the album peaked at number one and has since been certified five-times platinum by the Australian Recording Industry Association, denoting shipments of over 350,000 units. FutureSex/LoveSounds was the thirty-fourth best-selling album of 2006 in Australia, and third in the following year. In 2006, FutureSex/LoveSounds was ranked as the 18th most popular album of the year on the Billboard 200. The following year, FutureSex/LoveSounds was ranked as the 7th most popular album of 2007 on the Billboard 200.

== Legacy ==
The success of FutureSex/LoveSounds affected both Timberlake's and Timbaland's careers. For Timberlake, it further established his career as a solo artist. He comments, "'SexyBack' was the point when people stopped asking me when *NSYNC^{[sic]} were going to reunite and started asking what I was going to do next." Timberlake has also beefed up his fan base, gaining "hipster" fans in the wake of the album's success. Combining the international success of Timberlake's FutureSex/LoveSounds and Nelly Furtado's Loose, demands for Timbaland's work reportedly surged. Writing for Entertainment Weekly, Chris Willman remarked that FutureSex/LoveSounds is "like Timberlake's 'cred' record", although Chris Collis said Timbaland nearly stole the spotlight, sharing with Timberlake the "star" status.

Aside from earning critical acclaim for the album, according to Sia Michel of The New York Times, Timberlake was responsible for popularizing in 2006 the catchphrase "I'm bringing sexy back", which is culled from the lead single "SexyBack". It spawned a "phenomenon" in which video-makers spoofed the song. At least four parodies gained attention, such as "SweatyBack" and "HairyBack". In 2007, Timberlake was ranked among Time magazine's 100 men and women "whose power, talent or moral example is transforming the world". For the publication, Timbaland writes, "It's as if Justin had been born 26 years ago to deliver music to the world. There are those who follow and those who lead. Justin is a leader, setting the bar for what's expected of others." The album has been added to the Rock and Roll Hall of Fame's musical library and archive. Andrew Barker of Variety (2016) stated the album "helped recalibrate the sonic frequency of several years' worth of pop-radio trends."

In 2013, Maura Johnston from Vibe called it an "ambitious classic", writing FutureSex/LoveSounds "musically propelled the pop&B genre with audio novellas, interlude twists, Timbaland's weirdo sound effects and that irresistible falsetto" and "embraced the hard/soft duality implied by the title to thrilling effect—and because of their mastery of that balancing act, FutureSex/LoveSounds would go on to influence, if not define, much of the pop music that came after it." also adding it "pushed boundaries more forcefully than works by fellow crooners R. Kelly and Usher." For its 10th anniversary, Rolling Stone editor Brittany Spanos wrote "Ten years ago, Timberlake destroyed any doubt of his artistry or potential with the mature, innovative FutureSex/LoveSounds. The pop star experimented with R&B, funk, and rock to create a piece of music well ahead of its time. Today, the LP's influence can still be heard in everything from the worldly electro-soul of Zayn Malik to the moody sound of newcomers like Bryson Tiller. The album also signaled Timberlake's transition from pop hitmaker and Hollywood It Boy to a legitimate force as a musician and actor."

It changed the game. A bold departure from the warm, synthesized soul that The Neptunes helmed on Justified, FutureSex was steely and sweaty, a universal dance opus that made room for intimacy. The album had some of Timbaland's smartest work as a producer, with beds of elastic funk and electro-pop for Timberlake to roll around in. The album also had adult themes and f-bombs, speeding up the transition from Curly-Haired Boy to Shaved-Head Man for Timberlake. And it was so blindingly successful, from blockbuster sales to hit singles to a huge tour to real critical acclaim, that the pop world grew deeply anxious while awaiting Timberlake's post-FutureSex return, which finally occurred seven years later with The 20/20 Experience. And still, to me, those are not the greatest achievements of Timberlake's 2006 album. Ten years later, it's more clear than ever: FutureSex/LoveSounds had the best first half of any pop album in 25 years. You have to go back to 1979 for Off The Wall, by JT's idol Michael Jackson, to find a pop album with a first half that matches up.

— Fuse TV's music critic Jason Lipshutz writing for the 10th anniversary of the release.

FutureSex/LoveSounds was ranked as the 97th best album of all time on the Billboard Top 200 Albums of All Time.

== Track listing ==
All tracks are written by and produced by Justin Timberlake, Timothy "Timbaland" Mosley, and Nate "Danja" Hills, except where noted.

Standard edition
No.	Title	Writer(s)	Producer(s)	Length
1.	"FutureSex/LoveSound"			4:01
2.	"SexyBack"			4:02
3.	"Sexy Ladies / Let Me Talk to You (Prelude)"			5:32
4.	"My Love" (featuring T.I.)	Clifford Joseph Harris Jr.		4:36
5.	"LoveStoned / I Think She Knows (Interlude)"			7:24
6.	"What Goes Around... / ...Comes Around (Interlude)"			7:28
7.	"Chop Me Up" (featuring Timbaland and Three-6-Mafia)	Paul Duane Beauregard; Jordan Michael Houston III		5:04
8.	"Damn Girl" (featuring will.i.am)	William Adams	Jawbreakers	5:12
9.	"Summer Love / Set the Mood (Prelude)"			6:24
10.	"Until the End of Time"			5:22
11.	"Losing My Way"			5:22
12.	"(Another Song) All Over Again"	Matt Morris	Rick Rubin	5:45
Total length:				66:12

United Kingdom, Japanese and Best Buy bonus track
No.	Title	Writer(s)	Producer(s)	Length
13.	"Pose" (featuring Snoop Dogg)	Timberlake; Adams; Calvin Cordozar Broadus Jr.; Caleb Speir	Jawbreakers	4:46
Total length:				70:59

iTunes Store pre-order bonus track
No.	Title	Writer(s)	Producer(s)	Length
13.	"Boutique in Heaven"	Timberlake; Adams; Mike Shapiro	Jawbeakers	4:08
Total length:				70:20

Deluxe edition
No.	Title	Length
13.	"Until the End of Time" (duet with Beyoncé)	5:22
14.	"SexyBack (DJ Wayne Williams Ol' Skool Remix)" (featuring Missy Elliott) (additional writer: Melissa Arnette Elliott; additional production: Larry "Rock" Campbell^{[a]} and DJ Wayne Williams^{[a]})	4:16
15.	"Sexy Ladies" (featuring 50 Cent) (additional writer: Curtis Jackson)	3:50
Total length:		79:40

=== Notes ===
- ^{^[a]} signifies a remix producer.
- "Damn Girl" contains a sample of "A New Day (Is Here at Last)", written and performed by J. C. Davis.
- Deluxe edition includes a bonus DVD featuring behind the scenes footage and interviews for "SexyBack", "My Love", and "LoveStoned / I Think She Knows", along with their music videos, "What Goes Around... Comes Around" music video and behind the scenes footage, and live performances from Concert Prive, Parkinson, the MTV Europe Music Awards, and Video Music Awards.

== Personnel ==
Credits are adapted from album's liner notes.

=== Musicians ===
- Justin Timberlake – lead and background vocals, guitar (5), additional beat box (5), keyboards (9), choir arrangement and director (11), piano (12)
- Richard Adkins – violin (10)
- Peggy Baldwin – cello (10)
- Adrienne Banks – choir (11)
- Davis Barnett – viola (5, 6, 11)
- Brian Benning – violin (10)
- Charlie Bisharat – violin (10)
- Benorce Blackmon – guitar (12)
- Paul Blake – guitar (1)
- Roni "SuSu" Bobien – choir (11)
- Ida Bodin – double bass (10)
- Kevin Brandon – double bass (10)
- Tyann Brown – choir (11)
- David Campbell – conductor and string arrangements (12)
- Mark Cargill – contractor, concertmaster, and violin (10)
- Lenny Castro – percussion (12)
- Susan Chatman – violin (10)
- Phillippa "Pip" Clarke – violin (10)
- Jeff Clayton – flute (10)
- Mary Collymore – choir (11)
- Heather Covington – choir (11)
- Salvator Cracchiolo – trumpet (10)
- Mario De León – violin (12)
- Yvette Devereaux – violin (10)
- Jenny D'Lorenzo – cello (5, 6, 11)
- Andrew Duckles – viola (12)
- Melvin Dunlap – bass (12)
- Ernest Ehrhardt – cello (10)
- James Ford – trumpet (10)
- Matt Funes – viola (12)
- James Gadson – drums (12)
- Pam Gates – violin (10)
- Larry Gold – conductor and string arrangements (5, 6, 11)
- Nate "Danja" Hills – drums and keyboards (1–7, 9–11)
- Smokey Hormel – guitar (12)
- Robert James – choir (11)
- Gloria Justin – violin (5, 6, 11)
- Suzie Katayama – cello (12)
- Valarie King – flute (10)
- Emma Kummrow – violin (5, 6, 11)
- Timothy Landauer – cello (12)
- Hope Lawrence – choir (11)
- Songa Lee-Kitto – violin (10)
- Natalie Leggett – violin (12)
- Jennifer Levin – violin (12)
- Darrin McCann – viola (12)
- Marisa McLeod – violin (10)
- Clarence McDonald – organ (12)
- Roudy Michel – choir contractor (11)
- Melinda Michelle – choir (11)
- Patrick Morgan – viola (10)
- Giovana Moraga – cello (10)
- Oresa Napper – choir (11)
- Michele Nardone – viola (10)
- Charles Parker Jr. – violin (5, 6, 11)
- Cameron Patrick – viola (10)
- Darryl Pearson – bass (2, 3)
- Bill Pettaway – guitar (2)
- Ta-Ron Pollard – choir (11)
- Michele Richards – violin (12)
- Kathleen Robertson – violin (10)
- Jimbo Ross – viola (10)
- Renee Smith – choir (11)
- Caleb Speir – bass (8)
- Tereza Stanislav – violin (12)
- Nancy Stein-Ross – cello (10)
- Igor Szwec – violin (5, 6, 11)
- T.I. – rap (4)
- Three 6 Mafia – rap (7)
- Timbaland – drums (1–7, 9–11), keyboards (2–7, 9–11), additional vocals (2, 7), background vocals (3, 4), beat box (5)
- Mari Tsumura – violin (10)
- Josephina Vergara – violin (12)
- Hezekiah Walker – narrator (11)
- Ahmed Wallace – choir (11)
- Thomas Warren – choir (11)
- Imani Welch – choir (11)
- will.i.am – drum programming, keyboards, and rap (8)
- John Wittenberg – violin (12)
- Benjamin Wright – conductor and string arrangements (10)
- Craig Wiggins – choir arrangement and director (11)

=== Production ===
- Executive producer: Justin Timberlake
- Produced by Justin Timberlake (1–11), Timbaland and Nate "Danja" Hills (1–7, 9–11), will.i.am (8), Rick Rubin (12)
  - Production coordinator for Rick Rubin: Lindsay Chase
- Recorded by Jimmy Douglass (1–7, 9–11), Ethan Willoughby (4), Padraic Kerin (8), Jason Lader (12)
- Mixed by Jimmy Douglass & Timbaland (1–7, 9–11), Serban Ghenea (8), Andrew Scheps (12)
- Assistant engineers: Scott Elgin & Rob Montes (8)
- Strings recorded by Jeff Chestek (5, 6, 11), Kaliq Glover (10)
  - Assisted by John Stahl (5, 6, 11)
- Pro Tools engineer: Lisa Hampton (10)
- Additional Pro Tools engineer: John Hanes (8)
- Additional engineering: Ethan Willoughby (10), Dana Nielson (12)
  - Assisted by Phillip Broussard (12)
- Technical director: Dave Hampton (10)
- Three 6 Mafia vocals recorded by Ari Raskin (7)
- Mastered by Herb Powers Jr. for PM Entertainment
- Assisted by Ricardo Gutierrez
- Production coordinator: Stephanie Cooper Willoughby for Buddah Brown Entertainment, Inc.
- Creative director: Doug Lloyd
- Design: LLOYD&CO
- Photography: Terry Richardson
- Stylist: Joe Zee
- Hair: Frankie Payne
- Grooming: Catherine Furniss
- Additional photography: Rankin
- Stylist: Annie Psaltiras
- Grooming: Kim Verbeck

== Charts ==
=== Weekly charts ===
Weekly chart performance for FutureSex/LoveSounds
Chart (2006–2014)	Peak position
Australian Albums (ARIA)	1
Australian Urban Albums (ARIA)	1
Austrian Albums (Ö3 Austria)	5
Belgian Albums (Ultratop Flanders)	5
Belgian Albums (Ultratop Wallonia)	2
Canadian Albums (Billboard)	1
Danish Albums (Hitlisten)	3
Dutch Albums (Album Top 100)	4
European Albums (Billboard)	1
Finnish Albums (Suomen virallinen lista)	5
French Albums (SNEP)	5
German Albums (Offizielle Top 100)	3
Hungarian Albums (MAHASZ)	20
Irish Albums (IRMA)	1
Italian Albums (FIMI)	7
Japanese Albums (Oricon)	18
New Zealand Albums (RMNZ)	4
Norwegian Albums (VG-lista)	5
Polish Albums (ZPAV)	1
Portuguese Albums (AFP)	20
Scottish Albums (Official Charts)	2
South African Albums (RISA)	18
Spanish Albums (Promusicae)	30
Swedish Albums (Sverigetopplistan)	2
Swiss Albums (Schweizer Hitparade)	2
Taiwanese Albums (Five Music)	2
UK Albums (Official Charts)	1
UK R&B Albums (Official Charts)	1
US Billboard 200	1
US Top R&B/Hip Hop Albums (Billboard)	1

=== Year-end charts ===
2006 year-end chart performance for FutureSex/LoveSounds
Chart (2006)	Position
Australian Albums (ARIA)	34
Australian Urban Albums (ARIA)	4
Austrian Albums (Ö3 Austria)	68
Belgian Albums (Ultratop Flanders)	37
Belgian Albums (Ultratop Wallonia)	66
Danish Albums (Hitlisten)	9
Dutch Albums (Album Top 100)	33
European Albums (Billboard)	20
French Albums (SNEP)	73
German Albums (Offizielle Top 100)	42
Irish Albums (IRMA)	15
New Zealand Albums (RMNZ)	19
Swedish Albums (Sverigetopplistan)	23
Swiss Albums (Schweizer Hitparade)	27
UK Albums (OCC)	25
US Billboard 200	18
US Top R&B/Hip-Hop Albums (Billboard)	13
Worldwide Albums (IFPI)	5

2007 year-end chart performance for FutureSex/LoveSounds
Chart (2007)	Position
Australian Albums (ARIA)	3
Australian Urban Albums (ARIA)	1
Austrian Albums (Ö3 Austria)	27
Belgian Albums (Ultratop Flanders)	10
Belgian Albums (Ultratop Wallonia)	31
European Albums (Billboard)	4
French Albums (SNEP)	35
German Albums (Offizielle Top 100)	10
Italian Albums (FIMI)	41
New Zealand Albums (RMNZ)	6
Swedish Albums (Sverigetopplistan)	22
Swiss Albums (Schweizer Hitparade)	14
UK Albums (OCC)	16
US Billboard 200	7
US Top R&B/Hip-Hop Albums (Billboard)	10
Worldwide Albums (IFPI)	14

2008 year-end chart performance for FutureSex/LoveSounds
Chart (2008)	Position
Australian Albums (ARIA)	65
US Billboard 200	126
US Top R&B/Hip-Hop Albums (Billboard)	65

=== Decade-end charts ===
Chart (2000–2009)	Position
Australian Albums (ARIA)	29
US Billboard 200	20

=== All-time chart ===
Chart	Position
US Billboard 200	97

== Certifications ==
Region	Certification	Certified units/sales
Argentina (CAPIF)	Gold	20,000^{^}
Australia (ARIA)	6× Platinum	420,000^{^}
Austria (IFPI Austria)	Gold	15,000^{*}
Belgium (BRMA)	2× Platinum	100,000^{*}
Brazil (Pro-Música Brasil)	Platinum	60,000^{‡}
Canada (Music Canada)	7× Platinum	700,000^{‡}
Denmark (IFPI Danmark)	8× Platinum	160,000^{‡}
Finland (Musiikkituottajat)	Gold	18,005
France (SNEP)	Platinum	200,000^{*}
Germany (BVMI)	2× Platinum	400,000^{^}
Hungary (MAHASZ)	Gold	5,000^{^}
Ireland (IRMA)	6× Platinum	90,000^{^}
Italy (FIMI) (Since 2009)	Gold	25,000^{‡}
Japan (RIAJ)	Gold	100,000^{^}
New Zealand (RMNZ)	6× Platinum	90,000^{‡}
Poland (ZPAV)	2× Platinum	40,000^{‡}
Portugal (AFP)	Gold	10,000^{^}
Russia (NFPF)	Diamond	200,000^{*}
South Korea	—	10,975
Switzerland (IFPI Switzerland)	2× Platinum	60,000^{^}
United Kingdom (BPI)	4× Platinum	1,200,000^{‡}
United States (RIAA)	7× Platinum	7,000,000^{‡}
Summaries
Europe (IFPI)	Platinum	1,000,000^{*}
Worldwide	—	10,000,000
^{*} Sales figures based on certification alone.^{^} Shipments figures based on certification alone.^{‡} Sales+streaming figures based on certification alone.

== Release history ==
Country	Date	Edition	Format	Label	Ref.
Germany	September 8, 2006	Standard	CD	Sony	
Australia	September 9, 2006	Standard	CD	Sony	
United Kingdom	September 11, 2006	Standard	CD	RCA	
Canada	September 12, 2006	Standard	CD	Sony	
United States	September 12, 2006	Standard	CD	Jive; Zomba	
Japan	September 20, 2006	Standard	CD	Sony Japan	
Canada	October 3, 2006	Standard	LP	Sony	
United States	October 3, 2006	Standard	LP	Jive; Zomba	
United Kingdom	October 16, 2006	Standard	LP	RCA	
Germany	November 22, 2007	Deluxe	CD+DVD	Sony	
United Kingdom	November 26, 2007	Deluxe	CD+DVD	RCA	
Canada	November 27, 2007	Deluxe	CD+DVD	Sony	
United States	November 27, 2007	Deluxe	CD+DVD	Jive; Zomba	
Japan	December 19, 2007	Deluxe	CD+DVD	Sony Japan	
Japan	March 25, 2009	Standard	CD	Sony Japan	
Japan	December 23, 2015	Standard	CD	Sony Japan	

== See also ==
- List of UK Albums Chart number ones of the 2000s
- List of number-one albums of 2006 (Australia)
- List of number-one albums of 2006 (Canada)
- List of number-one albums of 2006 (Ireland)
- List of Billboard 200 number-one albums of 2006

== Bibliography ==
- Collis, Clark (February 5, 2007). "Sexy Beast". Entertainment Weekly. Archived from the original on March 24, 2007.
- Scaggs, Austin (September 6, 2006). "Justin Timberlake Revs Up His Sex Machine". Rolling Stone. Archived from the original on January 21, 2010.
