= Jawbreakers (duo) =

American production duo

- Genres: R&B, pop, hip hop
- Occupations: Record producers, songwriters
- Instruments: Drums, keys
- Years active: 2005–2007
- Past members: Justin Timberlake will.i.am

The Jawbreakers (stylized as the JAWBreakers) was an American production duo consisting of Justin Timberlake and will.i.am. According to will.i.am, the duo's name stands for "Justin and Will breaks".

== Background ==
In 2006, during the production of Justin Timberlake's second album FutureSex/LoveSounds, will.i.am stated: "I was surprised that I was even going to like Justin Timberlake. Then he turned me into a fan, and I've become a fan. That means you are so talented that you are changing people's vocabulary."

== Writing and production credits ==
| Title | Artist(s) | Album | Writer(s) | Year | Ref |
|---|---|---|---|---|---|
| "Floatin'" | Charlie Wilson; Justin Timberlake will.i.am | Charlie, Last Name Wilson | Justin Timberlake; Will Adams | 2005 | |
| "In the Sun (JAW Breakers Remix)" | Michael Stipe; Chris Martin | —N/a | Joseph Arthur | 2006 | |
| "Boutique in Heaven" | Justin Timberlake | FutureSex/LoveSounds | Justin Timberlake; Will Adams; Mike Shapiro | 2006 | |
| "Damn Girl" | Justin Timberlake will.i.am | FutureSex/LoveSounds | Justin Timberlake; Will Adams; J. C. Davis | 2006 | |
| "Pose" | Justin Timberlake; Snoop Dogg | FutureSex/LoveSounds | Justin Timberlake; Will Adams; Calvin Broadus; Caleb Speir | 2006 | |
| "Okay" | Macy Gray | Big | Natalie Hinds; Will Adams; Justin Timberlake; Caleb Speir | 2007 | |
| "Get Out" | Macy Gray | Big | Natalie Hinds; Will Adams; Justin Timberlake; Caleb Speir; Mike Shapiro | 2007 | |
