= FutureSex/LoveShow =

2007 concert tour by Justin Timberlake

FutureSex/Loveshow
- World tour by Justin Timberlake
- Associated album: FutureSex/LoveSounds
- Start date: January 8, 2007
- End date: December 6, 2007
- Legs: 4
- No. of shows: 121
- Box office: $126.8 million ($196.88 million in 2025 dollars)

Justin Timberlake concert chronology
- The Justified & Stripped Tour (2003); FutureSex/ LoveShow (2007); Legends of the Summer (2013)

The FutureSex/LoveShow was the third concert tour by American singer Justin Timberlake, launched in support of his second studio album, FutureSex/LoveSounds (2006). The tour began on January 8, 2007, in San Diego, with shows across North America, Europe, and Oceania. It concluded on December 6, 2007, in Abu Dhabi, comprising 121 shows. While Pink and Fergie served as the opening act for the North American leg, with the latter serving as the opening act for the European leg, Paris Wells served as the opening act for the Australian leg and Unklejam, Kenna, Natasha Bedingfield, and Esmée Denters for the European leg. It grossed a total of US$126.8 million, making it the third-highest-grossing concert tour of 2007.

== SexyBack Dance Club ==
A limited number of tickets were released, which gave fans access to a bar/club area around the stage known as the SexyBack Dance Club. There were two types of these tickets available: Seating and Standing. The seating tickets gave fans access to this area as well as a seat integrated into the stage itself. The standing tickets gave access to the same area without a seat.

== Critical reception ==
Rolling Stone editor Laura Checkoway, who attended the tour at the Madison Square Garden in April 2007, called the show "strictly grown and sexy" in her review. After attending the second Madison Square Garden date in August, Sia Michel from The New York Times thought "since his last tour, for 2002's multiplatinum Justified, he has learned how to project sex-symbol edge. During an ambitious, well-oiled spectacle of nearly three hours, this New Justin cursed, gyrated and mimicked bedroom acts with his lingerie-clad dancers." After attending the tour's Air Canada Centre show in August 2007, Jason MacNeil of Jam! gave it three-and-a-half stars out of five, and said that "while the set itself was identical to damn near every other show he's done on his current world tour, the two-hour-plus show has plenty of eye candy to keep even the casual fan interested".

Chris Willman of Entertainment Weekly, who attended the tour's first ever show at the iPayOne Center in San Diego, gave it a B+ and said, "Though the show could have used some tightening (FutureSex needn't be performed in its entirety — here's to losing Losing My Way), when Timberlake locked into some James Brown-esque footwork, you didn't want it to end". After attending The O2, London date, musicOMH's Jonny Carey wrote, "Tonight proved that as well as being responsible for some of this decade's best pop moments, Justin Timberlake is among the best performers and will be continuing to headline venues of this stature for years to come."

== Opening acts ==
- Pink (North America) (select dates)
- Fergie (North America & Europe) (select dates)
- Unklejam (Europe) (select dates)
- Kenna (Europe) (select dates)
- Natasha Bedingfield (Europe) (select dates)
- Esmée Denters (Europe) (select dates)
- Paris Wells (Australia) (selected dates)

== Set list ==
1. "FutureSex/LoveSound"
2. "Like I Love You"
3. "My Love" (contains excerpts from "Let Me Talk to You (Prelude)")
4. "Señorita"
5. "Sexy Ladies"
6. "Until the End of Time"
7. "What Goes Around... Comes Around"
8. "Chop Me Up"
9. "Rock Your Body"
10. Medley:
  1. "Gone"
  2. "Take It from Here"
  3. "Last Night"
11. "Damn Girl"
12. "Summer Love"
13. "Losing My Way"
14. "Cry Me a River"
15. "LoveStoned/I Think She Knows (Interlude)"
16. "SexyBack"

Encore

17. "(Another Song) All Over Again"

== Shows ==
List of North American concerts
Date (2007)	City	Country	Venue	Opening act(s)	Attendance (Tickets sold / total available)	Revenue
January 8	San Diego	United; States	iPayOne Center	Pink	12,526 / 12,526	$970,389
January 9	Anaheim	United; States	Honda Center	Pink	14,863 / 14,863	$1,095,698
January 11	San Jose	United; States	HP Pavilion	Pink	17,116 / 17,116	$1,320,326
January 12	Sacramento	United; States	ARCO Arena	Pink	15,347 / 15,347	$1,045,967
January 14	Glendale	United; States	Jobing.com Arena	Pink	14,645 / 14,645	$1,169,049
January 16	Los Angeles	United; States	Staples Center	N/A	N/A	N/A
January 17	Fresno	United; States	Save Mart Center	N/A	N/A	N/A
January 19	Las Vegas	United; States	MGM Grand Garden Arena	N/A	N/A	N/A
January 27	Saint Paul	United; States	Xcel Energy Center	N/A	N/A	N/A
January 30	Toronto	Canada	Air Canada Centre	Pink	19,041 / 19,041	$1,651,733
January 31	Montreal	Canada	Bell Centre	Pink	17,091 / 17,091	$1,819,425
February 2	Washington, D.C.	United; States	Verizon Center	N/A	N/A	N/A
February 3	Cleveland	United; States	Quicken Loans Arena	N/A	N/A	N/A
February 6	Boston	United; States	TD Banknorth Garden	N/A	N/A	N/A
February 7	New York City	United; States	Madison Square Garden	N/A	N/A	N/A
February 18	Buffalo	United; States	HSBC Arena	N/A	N/A	N/A
February 19	Columbus	United; States	Value City Arena	N/A	N/A	N/A
February 22	Tampa	United; States	St. Pete Times Forum	N/A	N/A	N/A
February 24	Miami	United; States	American Airlines Arena	N/A	N/A	N/A
February 25	Sunrise	United; States	BankAtlantic Center	N/A	N/A	N/A
February 27	Atlanta	United; States	Philips Arena	Pink	16,638 / 16,638	$1,129,984
March 1	New Orleans	United; States	New Orleans Arena	Pink	15,209 / 15,209	$826,084
March 3	Bossier City	United; States	CenturyTel Center	N/A	N/A	N/A
March 4	Houston	United; States	Toyota Center	Pink	16,974 / 16,974	$1,243,420
March 5	Dallas	United; States	American Airlines Center	Pink	17,418 / 17,418	$1,311,577
March 8	Omaha	United; States	Qwest Center Omaha	Pink	12,535 / 12,535	$860,841
March 9	Ames	United; States	Hilton Coliseum	N/A	N/A	N/A
March 10	Detroit	United; States	Joe Louis Arena	N/A	N/A	N/A
March 12	Rosemont	United; States	Allstate Arena	Pink	34,758 / 34,758	$2,532,272
March 13	Rosemont	United; States	Allstate Arena	Pink	34,758 / 34,758	$2,532,272
March 15	Cincinnati	United; States	US Bank Arena	N/A	N/A	N/A
March 16	Nashville	United; States	Nashville Arena	N/A	N/A	N/A
March 18	Charlottesville	United; States	John Paul Jones Arena	Pink	N/A	N/A
March 19	Pittsburgh	United; States	Mellon Arena	N/A	N/A	N/A
March 21	Uniondale	United; States	Nassau Veterans Memorial Coliseum	N/A	N/A	N/A
March 24	Uncasville	United; States	Mohegan Sun Arena	Pink	9,737 / 9,737	$713,850
March 26	Manchester	United; States	Verizon Wireless Arena	Pink	10,127 / 10,127	$753,454
March 27	Philadelphia	United; States	Wachovia Center	Pink	18,611 / 18,611	$1,308,817
March 29	East Rutherford	United; States	Continental Airlines Arena	N/A	N/A	N/A

List of European concerts
Date (2007)	City	Country	Venue	Opening act(s)	Attendance (Tickets sold / total available)	Revenue
April 24	Belfast	Northern Ireland	Odyssey Arena	Timbaland	18,098 / 18,098	$1,593,147
April 25	Belfast	Northern Ireland	Odyssey Arena	Timbaland	18,098 / 18,098	$1,593,147
April 27	Sheffield	England	Hallam FM Arena	Timbaland; Unkle Jam	16,975 / 16,975	$1,550,518
April 28	Sheffield	England	Hallam FM Arena	Timbaland; Unkle Jam	16,975 / 16,975	$1,550,518
April 30	Newcastle	England	Metro Radio Arena	Timbaland; Unkle Jam	15,951 / 15,951	$1,112,380
May 1	Newcastle	England	Metro Radio Arena	Timbaland; Unkle Jam	15,951 / 15,951	$1,112,380
May 3	Glasgow	Scotland	Scottish Exhibition and Conference Centre	Timbaland; Unkle Jam	26,821 / 26,821	$2,545,988
May 4	Glasgow	Scotland	Scottish Exhibition and Conference Centre	Timbaland; Unkle Jam	26,821 / 26,821	$2,545,988
May 5	Glasgow	Scotland	Scottish Exhibition and Conference Centre	Timbaland; Unkle Jam	26,821 / 26,821	$2,545,988
May 8	Birmingham	England	NEC Arena	Timbaland; Unkle Jam; Kenna	34,877 / 34,877	$2,755,695
May 9	Birmingham	England	NEC Arena	Timbaland; Unkle Jam; Kenna	34,877 / 34,877	$2,755,695
May 11	Birmingham	England	NEC Arena	Timbaland; Unkle Jam; Kenna	34,877 / 34,877	$2,755,695
May 14	Manchester	England	Manchester Evening News Arena	Timbaland; Unkle Jam; Kenna	31,858 / 31,858	$2,742,102
May 15	Manchester	England	Manchester Evening News Arena	Timbaland; Unkle Jam; Kenna	31,858 / 31,858	$2,742,102
May 19	Nottingham	England	Nottingham Arena	Timbaland; Unkle Jam; Kenna	9,770 / 9,770	$920,118
May 22	Paris	France	Palais Omnisports de Paris-Bercy	N/A	N/A	N/A
May 23	Paris	France	Palais Omnisports de Paris-Bercy	N/A	N/A	N/A
May 25	Stuttgart	Germany	Hanns-Martin-Schleyer-Halle	N/A	N/A	N/A
May 26	Munich	Germany	Olympiahalle	N/A	N/A	N/A
May 28	Frankfurt	Germany	Festhalle Frankfurt	N/A	N/A	N/A
May 29	Mannheim	Germany	SAP Arena	N/A	N/A	N/A
June 1	Milan	Italy	DatchForum	N/A	N/A	N/A
June 2	Zürich	Switzerland	Hallenstadion	N/A	N/A	N/A
June 4	Vienna	Austria	Wiener Stadthalle	N/A	N/A	N/A
June 6	Berlin	Germany	Max-Schmeling-Halle	N/A	N/A	N/A
June 7	Leipzig	Germany	Arena Leipzig	N/A	N/A	N/A
June 9	Hamburg	Germany	Color Line Arena	N/A	N/A	N/A
June 10	Cologne	Germany	Kölnarena	N/A	N/A	N/A
June 12	Lyon	France	Halle Tony Garnier	N/A	N/A	N/A
June 13	Dortmund	Germany	Westfalenhallen	N/A	N/A	N/A
June 16	Amsterdam	Netherlands	Amsterdam Arena	N/A	N/A	N/A
June 19	Stockholm	Sweden	Stockholm Globe Arena	N/A	N/A	N/A
June 21	Oslo	Norway	Oslo Spektrum	N/A	N/A	N/A
June 23	Copenhagen	Denmark	Parken Stadium	Esmée Denters; Natasha Bedingfield	55,041 / 55,041	$4,094,782
June 25	Gothenburg	Sweden	Scandinavium	N/A	N/A	N/A
June 27	Antwerp	Belgium	Sportpaleis	N/A	N/A	N/A
June 30	Dublin	Ireland	RDS Arena	Fergie; 50 Cent	59,501 / 59,501	$4,875,285
July 1	Dublin	Ireland	RDS Arena	Fergie; 50 Cent	59,501 / 59,501	$4,875,285
July 4	London	England	The O_{2} Arena	Esmée Denters	79,742 / 79,742	$7,346,893
July 5	London	England	The O_{2} Arena	Esmée Denters	79,742 / 79,742	$7,346,893
July 7	London	England	The O_{2} Arena	Esmée Denters	79,742 / 79,742	$7,346,893
July 8	London	England	The O_{2} Arena	Esmée Denters	79,742 / 79,742	$7,346,893
July 10	London	England	The O_{2} Arena	Esmée Denters	79,742 / 79,742	$7,346,893

List of North American concerts
Date (2007)	City	Country	Venue	Opening act(s)	Attendance (Tickets sold / total available)	Revenue
August 6	Memphis	United; States	FedExForum	N/A	N/A	N/A
August 7	Duluth	United; States	The Arena at Gwinnett Center	N/A	N/A	N/A
August 10	Boston	United; States	TD Banknorth Garden	N/A	N/A	N/A
August 11	Uncasville	United; States	Mohegan Sun Arena	N/A	N/A	N/A
August 13	East Rutherford	United; States	Continental Airlines Arena	Fergie	17,587 / 17,587	$1,301,664
August 15	New York City	United; States	Madison Square Garden	Fergie	36,546 / 36,546	$2,784,912
August 16	New York City	United; States	Madison Square Garden	Fergie	36,546 / 36,546	$2,784,912
August 18	Montreal	Canada	Bell Centre	Fergie	19,599 / 19,599	$2,026,805
August 20	Toronto	Canada	Air Canada Centre	Fergie	34,991 / 34,991	$3,375,692
August 21	Toronto	Canada	Air Canada Centre	Fergie	34,991 / 34,991	$3,375,692
August 25	Winnipeg	Canada	MTS Centre	Fergie	28,482 / 28,482	$2,168,471
August 26	Winnipeg	Canada	MTS Centre	Fergie	28,482 / 28,482	$2,168,471
August 28	Edmonton	Canada	Rexall Place	Fergie	17,360 / 17,360	$1,356,265
September 1	Las Vegas	United; States	Mandalay Bay Events Center	Fergie	19,810 / 19,810	$1,843,632
September 2	Las Vegas	United; States	Mandalay Bay Events Center	Fergie	19,810 / 19,810	$1,843,632
September 5	Vancouver	Canada	General Motors Place	Fergie	18,620 / 18,620	$1,765,608
September 7	Portland	United; States	Rose Garden	N/A	N/A	N/A
September 8	Tacoma	United; States	Tacoma Dome	N/A	N/A	N/A
September 16	Los Angeles	United; States	Staples Center	Fergie	48,886 / 48,886	$4,216,926
September 17	Los Angeles	United; States	Staples Center	Fergie	48,886 / 48,886	$4,216,926
September 19	Los Angeles	United; States	Staples Center	Fergie	48,886 / 48,886	$4,216,926
September 23	San Jose	United; States	HP Pavilion	Kenna	13,771 / 13,771	$1,157,917
September 25	Sacramento	United; States	ARCO Arena	N/A	N/A	N/A

List of Oceania and UAE concerts
Date (2007)	City	Country	Venue	Opening act(s)	Attendance (Tickets sold / total available)	Revenue
October 27	Brisbane	Australia	Brisbane Entertainment Centre	N/A	25,752 / 26,330	$2,985,210
October 28	Brisbane	Australia	Brisbane Entertainment Centre	N/A	25,752 / 26,330	$2,985,210
October 31	Sydney	Australia	Acer Arena	Paris Wells	58,788 / 58,788	$6,484,819
November 1	Sydney	Australia	Acer Arena	Paris Wells	58,788 / 58,788	$6,484,819
November 3	Adelaide	Australia	Adelaide Entertainment Centre	N/A	N/A	N/A
November 5	Melbourne	Australia	Rod Laver Arena	N/A	62,306 / 62,306	$6,295,577
November 6	Melbourne	Australia	Rod Laver Arena	N/A	62,306 / 62,306	$6,295,577
November 9	Perth	Australia	Burswood Dome	Paris Wells	38,496 / 38,496	$3,724,237
November 10	Perth	Australia	Burswood Dome	Paris Wells	38,496 / 38,496	$3,724,237
November 13	Sydney	Australia	Acer Arena	Paris Wells	(Note: The score data is combined from the three shows held at the Acer Arena on October 31, November 1 and 13 respectively.)	
November 17	Melbourne	Australia	Rod Laver Arena	N/A	(Note: The score data is combined from the four shows held at the Rod Laver Arena on November 5, November 6, November 17, and 18, respectively.)	
November 18	Melbourne	Australia	Rod Laver Arena	N/A	(Note: The score data is combined from the four shows held at the Rod Laver Arena on November 5, November 6, November 17, and 18, respectively.)	
November 23	Auckland	New Zealand	Vector Arena	Paris Wells	34,382 / 35,514	$3,502,719
November 24	Auckland	New Zealand	Vector Arena	Paris Wells	34,382 / 35,514	$3,502,719
November 26	Auckland	New Zealand	Vector Arena	Paris Wells	34,382 / 35,514	$3,502,719
December 6	Abu Dhabi	United; Arab; Emirates	Emirates Palace, West Park	N/A	N/A	N/A
Totals for entire tour					1,086,646 / 1,088,356	$94,280,248

== Broadcast and recordings ==
In May 2007, it was announced that Timberlake signed a deal with the premium television network HBO to broadcast the live concert. Timberlake previously appeared on an HBO special, which aired the *NSYNC Live From Madison Square Garden concert in 2000. FutureSex/LoveShow was taped on the second night at the Madison Square Garden on August 16, 2007. The footage was broadcast by HBO on September 3, 2007, and later on September 6 due to demand. On November 20, 2007, a two-disc edition of FutureSex/LoveShow: Live from Madison Square Garden was released on DVD and Blu-ray formats that were sold exclusively by the retailer Best Buy. The release included extra footage, including a song-by-song commentary by Timberlake and pre- and post-show clips.

At the 60th Primetime Creative Arts Emmy Awards in 2008, the broadcast won the award for Outstanding Picture Editing for a Special (Single or Multi-Camera). For Timberlake's performance of "What Goes Around... Comes Around" at the Madison Square Garden, Josh Tyrangiel of Time magazine ranked it second on its list of top ten live performances in 2007. Tyrangiel wrote: "It's a little on the long side, but Timberlake earns this symphonic take on What Goes Around from his HBO special". On October 31, 2007, Billboard magazine announced the finalists for the 2007 Billboard Touring Awards, which was based on actual box-office performance from January 1, 2007, to September 30, 2007. Timberlake was nominated in the categories Top Tour, Top Draw and Breakthrough Artist; he won the latter that was announced during the awards show on November 15, 2007.
