= What Goes Around... Comes Around =

2006 single by Justin Timberlake

Single by Justin Timberlake

from the album FutureSex/LoveSounds
- B-side: "Boutique in Heaven"
- Released: December 19, 2006
- Studio: Thomas Crown (Virginia Beach); The Studio (Philadelphia)
- Genre: Psychedelic pop; sophisti-pop
- Length: 7:29 (album version); 5:13 (radio edit)
- Label: Jive; Zomba
- Songwriters: Justin Timberlake; Tim Mosley; Nate "Danja" Hills
- Producers: Timbaland; Justin Timberlake; Nate "Danja" Hills

Justin Timberlake singles chronology
"Dick in a Box" (2006)	"What Goes Around... Comes Around" (2006)	"Give It to Me" (2007)

Music video
- "What Goes Around... Comes Around" on YouTube

"What Goes Around.../...Comes Around (Interlude)" is a song by American singer Justin Timberlake from his second studio album, FutureSex/LoveSounds (2006). It was written and produced by Timberlake, Timbaland, and Danja. The song was said by Timberlake to be about betrayal and forgiveness, and was described by some music critics as a psychedelic pop and sophisti-pop "sequel" to his 2002 single "Cry Me a River". The song was retitled "What Goes Around... Comes Around" for its December 19, 2006, release as the third single from FutureSex/LoveSounds.

"What Goes Around... Comes Around" received generally positive reviews from music critics. Commercially, it became Timberlake's third consecutive number-one hit on the Billboard Hot 100. Internationally, the song was also successful, reaching the top ten in countries such as the United Kingdom, Canada, New Zealand, Germany, and Australia. The song was later certified two-times platinum in Australia, gold in the United States, and gold in New Zealand. The song won Best Male Pop Vocal Performance at the 50th Grammy Awards, where it also received a nomination for Record of the Year.

The accompanying music video, directed by Samuel Bayer, was released on February 7, 2007. Actress Scarlett Johansson plays Timberlake's love interest in the video. The video received the award for Best Direction at the 2007 MTV Video Music Awards and was also nominated for Video of the Year.

== Background ==
In November 2002, Justin Timberlake released his debut solo album, Justified, which was a commercial success and received generally positive reviews from music critics. The album spawned four singles, including "Rock Your Body" and "Cry Me a River", which reached the top-five of the US Billboard Hot 100. After its release, Timberlake thought he "lost his voice" in the sense that he did not like what he was doing. He felt "burnt out" after Justified and he took a break from the music industry to become a film actor. His first role during this time was a journalist in the thriller Edison Force (2006). He also appeared in the 2006 films Alpha Dog, Black Snake Moan, and Southland Tales, and voiced Prince Artie Pendragon in the animated film Shrek the Third (2007).

When Timberlake felt inspired to compose songs again, he chose not to reunite with his former band NSYNC, though he considered it after his first record. Timberlake went to Justified collaborator Timbaland's new Thomas Crown Studios in Virginia Beach, Virginia, to begin sessions for his second album. Neither Timberlake nor Timbaland had any idea of what the album would be; there was no plan or title for it. He told his collaborators to do a remake of his previous single, "Cry Me a River". Danja, a protégé of Timbaland, stated: "We had no direction at all other than 'Cry Me a River,' and not in the sense of mimicking the track, but in how big the song was. There was no direction for how he wanted the song to sound, because there was no direction for how he wanted [his album FutureSex/LoveSounds] to sound."

The song was written and produced by Justin Timberlake, Timbaland, and Nate "Danja" Hills. While in the studio, the three men were just "fooling around" and "freestyling". When Danja began playing a guitar riff, it caught Timberlake's attention. Timberlake started humming to the melody, and then the lyrics came. Timbaland, who was at his keyboards beside Danja, added drums to the melody. Danja commented that "everything was coming together at the same time". After coming up with the music, Timberlake never wrote down the lyrics; in an hour, he was ready to record it. By the time Timberlake was in the vocal booth, the basic track was done, and then Timbaland produced a prelude of the song. Timberlake sang the song in a couple of takes and went back line by line to fill in the gaps. During the recording sessions, Timbaland and Danja added everything else, including the basses and strings. Danja compared the process to scoring a movie, thinking the song was like a horror flick.

"What Goes Around... Comes Around" was pivotal to the creation of FutureSex/LoveSounds. After finishing the production of the song, Timbaland teased Timberlake. Timberlake responded: "Let's do something we would never do. Let's go far left and just see what happens." His answer motivated the collective, and they ended up producing ten songs for the album.

== Composition ==
"What Goes Around.../...Comes Around" is a psychedelic pop and sophisti-pop ballad performed slowly. It is composed in the key of A Dorian (A Minor) in common time. With a gentle and midtempo beat, the tempo is pacing to 76 beats per minute. The song features a two-minute interlude titled "Comes Around", featuring the album's producer Timbaland, spanning a seven-minute and 28-second track. Timberlake's voice ranges from B_{2} to C_{5}. Musically, the song is similar to the type of music produced on Timberlake's Justified album; however, it is the only link from FutureSex/LoveSounds to Justified.

At the beginning of the song, there is a five-second harmony line of two bağlamas (one each panned far left and far right with respect to octaves), a Turkish folk instrument. The beat is then changed to a more upbeat version of the same melody with more percussion. The basic ornamentation is loyal to characteristic Turkish string ornamentations. Timbaland also used the Turkish oud to mellow out the guitar riff. The chord series follows the Am-C-G-D keys. Following the instrumental, Timberlake begins the verse at the thirteenth bar. The original track had a bridge, including the pre-verse, the verses, and the choruses. After hearing the vocals of Timberlake, they decided to remove the bridge and follow a simple flow, because they felt it was "too much" to have it and a break at the end of the song. Timbaland provides backing vocals on the song.

"What Goes Around.../...Comes Around" is about betrayal and forgiveness. Timberlake revealed that the song was written for the experience his friend went through. Many began to suspect that the song was about Elisha Cuthbert, who had been in a relationship with Timberlake's best friend. However, others came up with a different interpretation of the lyrics, that being a sequel to "Cry Me A River". Bill Lamb wrote that the song has a "cautionary tale in the lyrics". According to him, many fans and critics alike, after hearing the song, insisted that it is similar in meaning to "Cry Me a River", which allegedly accounts for Timberlake's relationship with former girlfriend, pop singer Britney Spears. However, Timberlake's account of the song's meaning contradicts this. Spence D. of IGN commented that the song presents "some intriguing ambiance".

== Critical reception ==
"With an instantly recognizable introduction, Timberlake teaches a master class on consequences."

— VH1's Emily Exton in 2013.

The song received generally positive reviews from critics. Rolling Stone called the single "a soaring ballad featuring Timberlake's falsetto, with verses and choruses that pile on top of one another with dizzying effect." About.com reviewer Bill Lamb stated that the song "is one of the most gorgeous pop melodies of the year." He complimented the string-based arrangement of the song. Chris Willman of Entertainment Weekly called it "superior", along with "LoveStoned". Zach Baron of Pitchfork Media referred to it "some real can't-let-go shit that'll save you the repeat stabs on the bad night." Spence D. of IGN called it "annoying" but he complimented the use of echo vocals and swirling synths.

In later reviews, Billboard's Katie Atkinson noted, "with a whopping 7:28 running time, it was a very long single. But there are a lot of great pieces to this too-big puzzle." Complex staff described it as "smooth, velvety and self-assured" track, noting the singer "is not guessing that his cheating ex will be punished for her transgression—he's sure she will be."

"What Goes Around.../...Comes Around" placed at number 24 on Rolling Stone's list of the 100 Best Songs of 2007. The song was nominated twice at the 50th Annual Grammy Awards, winning Best Male Pop Vocal Performance but lost to Amy Winehouse's "Rehab" for Record of the Year.

== Commercial performance ==
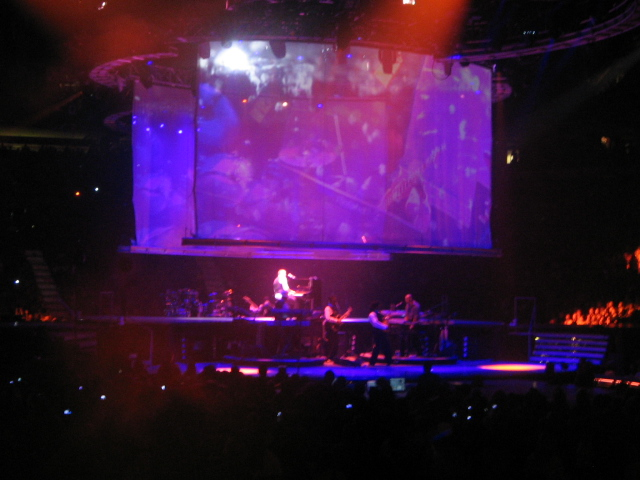
Justin Timberlake singing "What Goes Around..." during a live concert

"What Goes Around.../...Comes Around" was commercially successful in the United States. The single debuted at number 64 on December 23, 2006, on the Billboard Hot 100, before its physical release. From number eight on February 24, 2007, it propelled to number one the following week. "What Goes Around.../...Comes Around" became Timberlake's third consecutive number one hit on the Billboard Hot 100 from his FutureSex/LoveSounds album, becoming the first male artist since Usher in 2004 to have three or more consecutive number-one hits from one album. The single charted on Hot 100 for 25 weeks. "What Goes Around.../...Comes Around" was certified platinum by the Recording Industry Association of America on June 7, 2007. By September 3, 2010, the song had passed the two million sales plateau, and has sold 2,375,000 copies as of April 2013. As of 2018, the song has accumulated 3.5 million units in the US, combining sales (2.8 million copies) and equivalent streams.

In the United Kingdom, "What Goes Around.../...Comes Around" debuted at number 59 on the UK Singles Chart on January 28, 2007. The digital download sales helped propel the single to number 11 on February 25, 2007. "What Goes Around.../...Comes Around" peaked at number four on March 11, to become his sixth top five single in the United Kingdom. It stayed on the chart for 22 weeks. The single entered the top five in Austria, Belgium, Denmark, Finland, France, Germany, Ireland, Norway, Romania (where it reached number one) and Switzerland. In Australia, the single debuted and peaked at number three on the Australian ARIA singles chart on March 26, 2007, gaining the Highest Debut certification. It spent a total of 22 weeks on the chart. "What Goes Around.../...Comes Around" was certified two-times platinum by the Australian Recording Industry Association for selling over 30,000 units. The single peaked at number three in New Zealand on April 9, 2007, and spent 16 weeks on the chart. "What Goes Around.../...Comes Around" was certified gold by the Recording Industry Association of New Zealand.

== Music video ==
=== Development ===
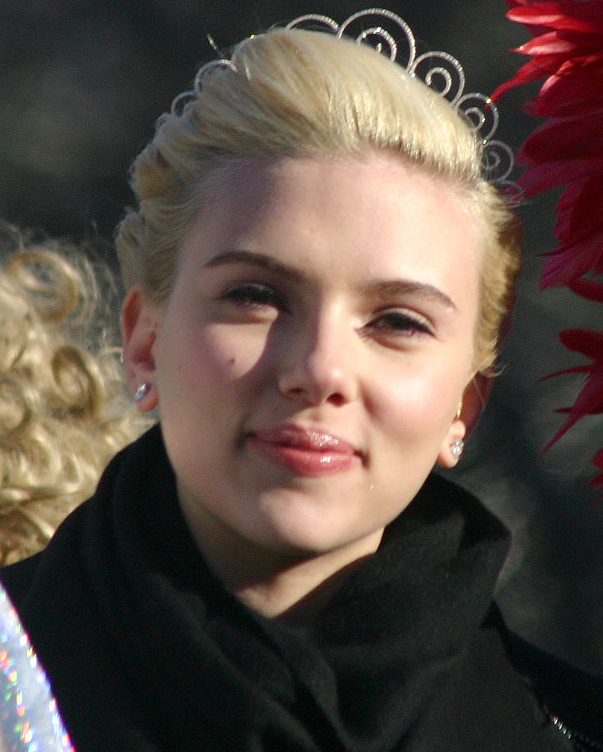
Director Samuel Bayer and Timberlake chose American actress Scarlett Johansson after deciding on using "real" actors for the music video to "What Goes Around... Comes Around".

The music video for the "What Goes Around... Comes Around" was produced as a short movie. The video was directed by Samuel Bayer, who had first directorial works with Nirvana's 1991 single "Smells Like Teen Spirit". The video features dialogues written by Alpha Dog writer and director Nick Cassavetes, who had previously worked with Timberlake in the film. Timberlake and Bayer enlisted American actress Scarlett Johansson after deciding on using "real" actors. The shooting went for three days between Christmas and New Year's Eve 2006 in Los Angeles. The dawn scene was shot on January 8, after the original sessions were done.

=== Synopsis ===
The video starts with Timberlake flirting with Johansson at the burlesque-style club. She rejects with a tease at first, but eventually leaves with him to go back to his place. In between cuts, they are shown in bed, caressing each other. Johansson jumps into a pool outside the house and floats below the surface as if she is drowning. Timberlake runs out and pulls her up; she laughs at Timberlake and kisses him.

In another scene, Timberlake introduces her to a drunk Shawn Hatosy at the club, calling her "The One". Hatosy seems to be interested in Johansson, and Timberlake asks him to "keep an eye on her for me", perhaps suspecting she has another man on the side. Timberlake returns and finds them kissing in the stairway. After punching Hatosy, Johansson and Timberlake start a heated argument before Timberlake chases after Johansson, who speeds off in her 1967 Corvette Sting Ray; Timberlake follows in his Porsche Carrera GT. Johansson runs into a fiery car crash pile-up and is ejected from the car as it tumbles through the air and lands several feet away twice. Timberlake notices Johansson's motionless body lying supine on the ground. He gets out and kneels over her while the camera view moves toward the sky. The end of the video references the ending of the 1960 movie BUtterfield 8 in which Gloria, the main character portrayed by Elizabeth Taylor, dies in the same manner, with the scenes sharing many similar shots.

Some scenes show Timberlake performing on the stairway with a microphone while a group of unknown girls with red paint on their eyes are seen dancing next to him, while one (Johansson) is seen waving her batons with fire on them near the end of the video.

=== Release and reception ===
The music video of "What Goes Around... Comes Around" was exclusively premiered on February 9, 2007, on the iTunes Store. The music video debuted on MTV's Total Request Live at number nine on February 13, 2007. "What Goes Around..." retired on May 7 at number seven. In Canada, the music video debuted on Muchmusic's Top 30 countdown at number 22 on January 26, 2007. It peaked at number one on April 27 and stayed on the chart for seven non-consecutive weeks. The video was commercially successful, becoming the fastest selling pop promo on iTunes. It has sold 50,000 in downloads for four days. Timberlake was the first major artist to release a video on the download platform.

In September 2007, "What Goes Around... Comes Around" won an MTV Video Music Award for Best Direction. It was also nominated for Video of the Year but lost to singer Rihanna's 2007 video "Umbrella".

== Live performances ==
Timberlake performed the song on Saturday Night Live. Timberlake performed twice at the 49th Annual Grammy Awards, once at the piano for "What Goes Around Comes Around" and later "My Love" and Bill Withers' "Ain't No Sunshine." The song is featured on the set list of FutureSex/LoveShow (2007), the Legends of the Summer Stadium Tour (2013), The 20/20 Experience World Tour (2013–2015), The Man of the Woods Tour (2018–2019), and The Forget Tomorrow World Tour (2024–2025). Timberlake performed the song along with Shawn Mendes at the 2018 iHeartRadio Music Festival. He also performed it at a NPR Tiny Desk Concert on March 15, 2024.

== Credits and personnel ==
Credits are adapted from the FutureSex/LoveSounds booklet.

- Davis Barnett – viola
- Jeff Chestek – strings recorder
- Jenny D'Lorenzo – cello
- Jimmy Douglass – mixer, recorder
- Larry Gold – conductor, strings arranger
- Nathaniel Hills – drums, keys, producer, writer
- Gloria Justin – violin
- Emma Kummrow – violin
- Timothy Mosley – drums, Roland TR-808 claps, keys, mixer, producer, recorder, writer
- Charles Parker, Jr – violin
- John Stahl – strings recorder assistant
- Igor Szwec – violin
- Justin Timberlake – producer, writer

== Charts ==
=== Weekly charts ===
Weekly chart performance for "What Goes Around... Comes Around"
Chart (2007)	Peak position
Australia (ARIA)	3
Australian Dance (ARIA)	1
Austria (Ö3 Austria Top 40)	5
Belgium (Ultratop 50 Flanders)	8
Belgium (Ultratop 50 Wallonia)	17
Canada Hot 100 (Billboard)	3
Canada AC (Billboard)	36
Canada CHR/Top 40 (Billboard)	2
Canada Hot AC (Billboard)	4
CIS Airplay (TopHit)	4
Czech Republic Airplay (ČNS IFPI)	10
Denmark (Tracklisten)	3
Europe (Eurochart Hot 100)	1
Finland (Suomen virallinen lista)	3
France (SNEP)	5
Germany (GfK)	5
Germany Airplay (BVMI)	2
Hungary (Rádiós Top 40)	5
Hungary (Dance Top 40)	39
Ireland (IRMA)	6
Italy (FIMI)	11
Netherlands (Dutch Top 40)	6
Netherlands (Single Top 100)	13
New Zealand (Recorded Music NZ)	3
Norway (VG-lista)	7
Romania (Romanian Top 100)	1
Russia Airplay (TopHit)	7
Scottish Singles Sales (Official Charts)	10
Slovakia Airplay (ČNS IFPI)	5
Sweden (Sverigetopplistan)	10
Switzerland (Schweizer Hitparade)	5
UK Singles (Official Charts)	4
UK Airplay (Music Week)	5
UK Hip Hop/R&B (Official Charts)	3
US Billboard Hot 100	1
US Adult Pop Airplay (Billboard)	15
US Dance Airplay (Billboard)	2
US Dance Club Songs (Billboard)	17
US Hot R&B/Hip-Hop Songs (Billboard)	76
US Pop Airplay (Billboard)	1
US Rhythmic Airplay (Billboard)	17
Venezuela Pop Rock (Record Report)	6

=== Year-end charts ===
Year-end chart performance for "What Goes Around... Comes Around"
Chart (2007)	Position
Australia (ARIA)	31
Austria (Ö3 Austria Top 40)	33
Belgium (Ultratop 50 Flanders)	47
Belgium (Ultratop 50 Wallonia)	73
Brazil (Crowley)	42
CIS (TopHit)	18
Europe (Eurochart Hot 100)	23
France (SNEP)	56
Germany (Media Control GfK)	34
Hungary (Rádiós Top 40)	48
Italy (FIMI)	36
Netherlands (Dutch Top 40)	38
Netherlands (Single Top 100)	47
New Zealand (RIANZ)	25
Romania (Romanian Top 100)	2
Russia Airplay (TopHit)	23
Sweden (Sverigetopplistan)	70
Switzerland (Schweizer Hitparade)	17
UK Singles (OCC)	28
UK Urban (Music Week)	24
US Billboard Hot 100	22

=== Decade-end charts ===
Decade-end chart performance for "What Goes Around... Comes Around"
Chart (2000–2009)	Position
Russia Airplay (TopHit)	138

== Certifications ==
Certifications and sales for "What Goes Around... Comes Around"
Region	Certification	Certified units/sales
Australia (ARIA)	2× Platinum	140,000^{‡}
Brazil (Pro-Música Brasil)	Diamond	250,000^{‡}
Canada (Music Canada)	Platinum	40,000^{*}
Denmark (IFPI Danmark)	Gold	4,000^{^}
Germany (BVMI)	Platinum	300,000^{‡}
Italy (FIMI)	Gold	25,000^{‡}
New Zealand (RMNZ)	3× Platinum	90,000^{‡}
United Kingdom (BPI)	Platinum	600,000^{‡}
United States (RIAA)	Platinum	2,800,000
Mastertone/Ringtone
Canada (Music Canada)	Gold	20,000^{*}
United States (RIAA)	Gold	500,000^{*}
Streaming
Denmark (IFPI Danmark)	Gold	900,000^{†}
^{*} Sales figures based on certification alone.^{^} Shipments figures based on certification alone.^{‡} Sales+streaming figures based on certification alone.^{†} Streaming-only figures based on certification alone.

== Release history ==
Release dates and formats for "What Goes Around... Comes Around"
Region	Date	Format	Label	Ref.
United States	December 19, 2006	Digital download (radio edit)	Jive	
France	January 2, 2007	Digital download (radio edit)	Sony	
United States	January 8, 2007	Contemporary hit radio	Jive	
United States	January 8, 2007	Rhythmic radio	Jive	
United States	February 27, 2007	Digital download (The Remixes)	Jive	
United Kingdom	March 5, 2007	CD single	RCA	
Germany	March 7, 2007	CD single	Sony	
France	March 12, 2007	Digital download (EP)	Sony	

== See also ==
- List of Romanian Top 100 number ones of the 2000s
