= Summer Love (Justin Timberlake song) =

2007 single by Justin Timberlake

Single by Justin Timberlake

from the album FutureSex/LoveSounds
- B-side: "Until the End of Time"
- Released: April 10, 2007
- Studio: Thomas Crown (Virginia Beach, Virginia)
- Genre: Dance-pop
- Length: 6:24 (album version); 4:11 (radio edit)
- Label: Jive; Zomba
- Songwriters: Justin Timberlake; Tim Mosley; Nate Hills
- Producers: Timbaland; Danja; Justin Timberlake

Justin Timberlake singles chronology
"Give It to Me" (2007)	"Summer Love" (2007)	"LoveStoned" (2007)

"Summer Love" is a song by American singer Justin Timberlake from his second studio album, FutureSex/LoveSounds (2006). It was written and produced by Timberlake, Timothy "Timbaland" Mosley and Nate "Danja" Hills. It was produced following Timberlake's two-year hiatus from the music industry, when he felt "burnt out" after the release of his debut solo album Justified in 2002. "Summer Love" is a dance-pop song about "wanting to fall in love with the lusty seasonal lover". Its instrumentation consists of keyboards, drums, guitars, pianos, and handclaps.

Jive Records and Zomba released "Summer Love" on April 10, 2007, as the fourth single from FutureSex/LoveSounds. It received generally positive reviews from music critics, with some comparing it to his work with his former group NSYNC. It reached number six on the Billboard Hot 100 and number one on the Billboard Pop Songs chart. It was certified platinum by the Recording Industry Association of America (RIAA) for selling over one million units. It also peaked at the top 10 in Belgium and Canada.

== Background and production ==
In November 2002, Justin Timberlake released his debut solo album, Justified, which was a commercial success and received generally positive reviews from music critics. The album spawned four singles, including "Rock Your Body" and "Cry Me a River", which reached the top-five of the US Billboard Hot 100. After its release, Timberlake thought he "lost his voice" in the sense that he did not like what he was doing. He felt "burnt out" after Justified and he took a break from the music industry to become a film actor. His first role during this time was a journalist in the thriller Edison Force (2006). He also appeared in the 2006 films Alpha Dog, Black Snake Moan, and Southland Tales, and voiced Prince Artie Pendragon in the animated film Shrek the Third (2007).

When Timberlake felt inspired to compose songs again, he chose not to reunite with his former band NSYNC, though he considered it after his first record. Timberlake went to Justified collaborator Timbaland's new Thomas Crown Studios in Virginia Beach, Virginia, to begin sessions for his second album. Neither Timberlake nor Timbaland had any idea of what the album would be; there was no plan or title for it. FutureSex/LoveSounds was released on September 12, 2006, by Jive Records and Zomba; "Summer Love/Set the Mood (Prelude)" places at number nine on the album's track list. It was written and produced by Tim "Timbaland" Mosley, Nate "Danja" Hills, and Timberlake himself. The song was recorded by Jimmy Douglas, while its mixing was done by Douglas together with Timbaland. The keyboards were provided by Timberlake, Timbaland, and Danja; the latter also played the drums in the single.

== Composition ==
"Summer Love" (2006)
A 20-second sample of the chorus of "Summer Love". Its instrumentation consists of keyboards, drums, guitar, piano, and "handclapping".

"Summer Love" is an uptempo pop song, with a length of 4 minutes and 13 seconds. According to digital sheet music published at Musicnotes.com by Universal Music Publishing Group, "Summer Love" was written in the key of D minor, in common time with a moderately slow 96 beat-per-minute tempo. Timberlake's vocal range in the song spans from the low note of D4 to the high note of A5. Its instrumentation consists of keyboards, drums, guitar, piano, and handclaps. Barry Schwartz of Stylus Magazine praised the song and commented that "with its good foot hesitation boom-clap and cascading chorus synthline" 'Summer Love' shows Timberlake's best vocals on FutureSex/LoveSounds." Schwartz further said that "the beat drops out while he sings in perfect harmony, 'Tell me how they got that pretty little face on that pretty little frame girl'". Lyrically, the single is about "wanting to fall in love with the lusty seasonal lover".

== Reception ==
Barry Schwartz of Stylus Magazine gave "Summer Love" a positive review and additionally praised "its good foot hesitation boom-clap and cascading chorus". Shaheem Reid and Jayson Rodriguez off MTV News stated that "Summer Love" alongside Timberlake's 2007 singles "My Love" and "LoveStoned", rocked every iPod, stereo player and stadium during his tour. North by Northwestern's Dagny Salas called "Summer Love/Set the Mood (Interlude)" a stand-out track on FutureSex/LoveSounds. According to him the song "oozes sun, sex, and a sultry affair". A reviewer of IGN commented that "the bulk of the album is focused on funk lite, but with 'Summer Love/Set The Mood (Prelude)' Timberlake and Timbaland slip into darkness." An editor of Billboard criticized Timbaland's production: "[W]hile the track offers cunning instrumentation, Timbaland's heavy production hand is so overwhelming that the singer is pushed to the back of the track".

In North America, "Summer Love" peaked at number 6 on the US Billboard Hot 100. On airplay charts, it peaked at number 24 on Adult Pop Airplay, number 1 on Pop Airplay, and number 10 on Rhythmic Airplay. It was certified platinum by the Recording Industry Association of America (RIAA) for sales of 1,600,000 copies, and gold as a ringtone. The song peaked at number 8 on the Canadian Hot 100. On airplay charts, it peaked at number 1 on Canada CHR/Top 40 and number 9 on Canada Hot AC. It was certified gold by Music Canada for both the single and ringtone formats. In Europe, "Summer Love" peaked at number 47 in Austria, numbers 6 and 8 on the Belgium Ultratip Bubbling Under charts, number 191 on the CIS Airplay chart, number 39 in Germany, number 22 on the Slovakia Airplay chart, and number 38 in Sweden. It was certified silver by the British Phonographic Industry (BPI). In Oceania, the song peaked at number 14 on the Australia Digital Track Chart and number 15 in New Zealand, where it was certified 2× platinum by Recorded Music NZ (RMNZ).

== Live performances ==
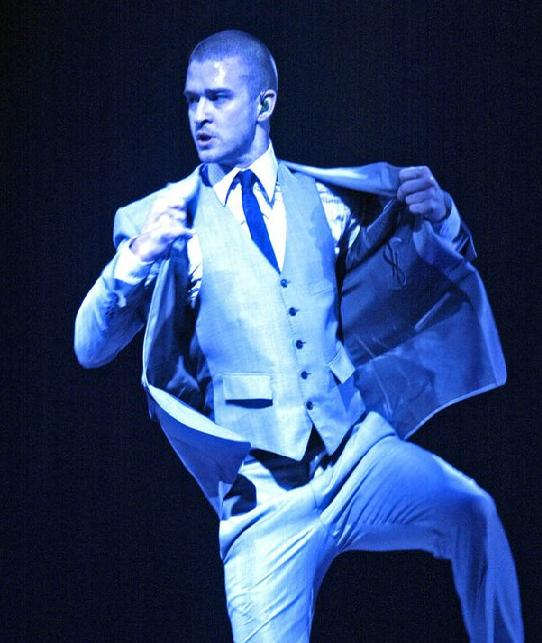
Justin Timberlake performing on his 2007 FutureSex/LoveShow tour

Timberlake included "Summer Love" on the set list of his 2007 worldwide tour, FutureSex/LoveShow. He also included it on the set lists of the Legends of the Summer Stadium Tour with rapper Jay-Z (2013), The 20/20 Experience World Tour (2013–2015), The Man of the Woods Tour (2018–2019), and The Forget Tomorrow World Tour (2024–2025).

== Credits and personnel ==
Credits are adapted from the liner notes of FutureSex/LoveSounds.

=== Locations ===
- Recorded and mixed at Thomas Crown Studios in Virginia Beach, Virginia

=== Personnel ===
- Jimmy Douglas – Recording, mixing
- Nate "Danja" Hills – Drums, keyboards, production, songwriting
- Tim "Timbaland" Mosley – Drums, keyboards, mixing, production, songwriting
- Justin Timberlake – Background vocals, keyboards, production, songwriting

== Charts ==
=== Weekly charts ===
Weekly chart performance
Chart (2007)	Peak position
Australia (ARIA Digital Tracks Chart)	14
Austria (Ö3 Austria Top 40)	47
Belgium (Ultratip Bubbling Under Flanders)	6
Belgium (Ultratip Bubbling Under Wallonia)	8
Canada Hot 100 (Billboard)	8
Canada CHR/Top 40 (Billboard)	1
Canada Hot AC (Billboard)	9
CIS Airplay (TopHit)	191
Germany (GfK)	39
New Zealand (Recorded Music NZ)	15
Slovakia Airplay (ČNS IFPI)	22
Sweden (Sverigetopplistan)	38
US Billboard Hot 100	6
US Adult Pop Airplay (Billboard)	24
US Pop Airplay (Billboard)	1
US Rhythmic Airplay (Billboard)	10

=== Year-end charts ===
Year-end chart performance
Chart (2007)	Position
Brazil (Crowley)	97
US Billboard Hot 100	39

== Certifications ==
Certifications and sales
Region	Certification	Certified units/sales
Canada (Music Canada)	Gold	20,000^{*}
Canada (Music Canada) Ringtone	Gold	20,000^{*}
New Zealand (RMNZ)	2× Platinum	60,000^{‡}
United Kingdom (BPI)	Silver	200,000^{‡}
United States (RIAA)	Platinum	1,600,000
United States (RIAA) Medley: Summer Love/Set the Mood (Prelude)	Gold	500,000^{*}
^{*} Sales figures based on certification alone.^{‡} Sales+streaming figures based on certification alone.

== Release history ==
Release dates and formats
Region	Date	Format	Label	Ref.
United States	April 2007	Contemporary hit radio	RCA	
Germany	December 7, 2007	CD single	Sony BMG	
