= Until the End of Time (Justin Timberlake and Beyoncé song) =

Single by Justin Timberlake and Beyoncé

from the album FutureSex/LoveSounds
- A-side: "Summer Love"
- B-side: "LoveStoned/I Think She Knows"
- Released: November 13, 2007
- Recorded: 2005
- Studio: Thomas Crown (Virginia Beach, Virginia)
- Genre: Quiet storm; soul; R&B
- Length: 5:22; 7:33 (with "Set the Mood" prelude)
- Label: Jive; Zomba
- Songwriters: Justin Timberlake; Timothy Mosley; Nate "Danja" Hills
- Producers: Timbaland; Justin Timberlake; Danja

Justin Timberlake singles chronology
"Ayo Technology" (2007)	"Until the End of Time" (2007)	"The Only Promise That Remains" (2007)

Beyoncé singles chronology
"Green Light" (2007)	"Until the End of Time" (2007)	"Love in This Club Part II" (2008)

Audio video
- "Until the End of Time" on YouTube

"Until the End of Time" is a song by American singer-songwriter Justin Timberlake from his second studio album, FutureSex/LoveSounds (2006). A quiet storm, soul, and R&B song, it was written and produced by Timberlake, Timbaland, and Nate "Danja" Hills. The song was later re-recorded as a duet with American singer Beyoncé, which was released as a single on November 13, 2007, and included on the album's deluxe edition.

"Until the End of Time" received mixed reviews from music critics, who praised its dreamy, romantic tone and vocal performances. Commercially, it reached the top 20 on the US Billboard Hot 100, being the sixth single from the album to do so, with Timberlake becoming the only male artist in the decade to achieve this. During the concert tour FutureSex/LoveShow, Timberlake performed the song as a piano solo.

== Background and composition ==
In November 2002, Justin Timberlake released his debut solo album, Justified, which was a commercial success and received generally positive reviews from music critics. The album spawned four singles, including "Rock Your Body" and "Cry Me a River", which reached the top-five of the US Billboard Hot 100. After its release, Timberlake thought he "lost his voice" in the sense that he did not like what he was doing. He felt "burnt out" after Justified and he took a break from the music industry to become a film actor. His first role during this time was a journalist in the thriller Edison Force (2006). He also appeared in the 2006 films Alpha Dog, Black Snake Moan, and Southland Tales, and voiced Prince Artie Pendragon in the animated film Shrek the Third (2007).

When Timberlake felt inspired to compose songs again, he chose not to reunite with his former band NSYNC, though he considered it after his first record. Timberlake went to Justified collaborator Timbaland's new Thomas Crown Studios in Virginia Beach, Virginia, to begin sessions for his second album. Neither Timberlake nor Timbaland had any idea of what the album would be; there was no plan or title for it. "Until the End of Time" was written by Timberlake, Timbaland, and Nate "Danja" Hills as a quiet storm ballad, R&B slow jam. The song utilizes Linn drums, which Ben Williams of New York compared to Prince's "The Beautiful Ones".

== Reception ==
In his review for Entertainment Weekly, Michael Slezak opined the single "sounds like another smash. The original flavor was already a treat —a stripped-down slow jam with a gorgeously simple melody". For Complex, Tannis Spencer wrote, "Justin and Beyonce got nice and comfy on this ballad and complement each from start to finish. The beat is slow with an accompanying string section that serves as the perfect backdrop for when Justin hits his high notes. The record has a sultry sound which helps offset the super futuristic sound on the rest of the album." Billboard editor Adelle Platon described it as a "dreamy love song". Quentin B. Huff of PopMatters wrote that "Until the End of Time" is heavily reminiscent of Prince's work, adding "both songs (with "Sexy Ladies") are album highlights, but they don't seem to strive for the same level of innovation as other songs in the set." Sputnikmusic's Amanda Murray called the song "excessively bland".

In the United States, the solo version of "Until the End of Time" entered the top 40 on the Billboard Hot 100 for the chart issued October 20, 2007, making him the first solo male artist that decade to spawn six top 40 singles from the same album. The previous male soloist to achieve that feat was Michael Jackson with Dangerous, which generated seven top 40 Hot 100 entries during 1991–1993. The previous album overall to do so was Shania Twain's Come On Over, which had six top 40 singles during 1997–1999. The same week, the song entered the top five on the Hot R&B/Hip-Hop Songs chart. Eventually, the duet version became Timberlake's 17th and Beyoncé's 21st career top 20 song on the Hot 100. The song also became the album's sixth US top 20 entry, making Timberlake the first to achieve that since Michael Jackson in 1991. It also became Beyoncé's highest charting single on US Adult R&B radio peaking at number 2, until "Love On Top" in 2012.

== Live performances ==
Timberlake included "Until the End of Time" on the set list of his 2007 worldwide tour, FutureSex/LoveShow. He also included it on the set lists of the Legends of the Summer Stadium Tour (2013), The 20/20 Experience World Tour (2013–15), The Man of the Woods Tour (2018–19), and The Forget Tomorrow World Tour (2024–25). A shortened selection of the song was included in Timberlake's Super Bowl LII halftime show performance in 2018, and featured him playing a white grand piano.

== Formats and track listings ==
Digital download (3-track)

1. "Until the End of Time" – 5:22
2. "Summer Love" (Main Version – Clean) – 4:12
3. "LoveStoned/I Think She Knows" (Justice Remix) – 4:43

Remixes EP

1. "Until the End of Time" (Jason Nevins Extended Mix) – 7:20
2. "Until the End of Time" (Jason Nevins Mixshow) – 5:42
3. "Until the End of Time" (Ralphi Rosario BIG Radio Mix) – 3:53
4. "Until the End of Time" (Johnny Vicious and DJ Escape Remix) – 8:35
5. "Until the End of Time" (Mike Rizzo Global Club Mix) – 7:30
6. "Until the End of Time" (Jonathan Peters Club Mix) – 8:50

== Credits and personnel ==
Credits adapted from FutureSex/LoveSounds booklet:

=== The Benjamin Wright Orchestra ===
- Richard Adkins – violin
- Peggy Baldwin – viola
- Brian Benning – violin
- Charlie Bisharat – violin
- Ida Bodin – bass
- Kevin Brandon – bass
- Mark Cargill – concertmaster, contractor, violin
- Susan Chatman – violin
- Phillippa "Pip" Clarke – violin
- Jeff Clayton – flute
- Salvator Cracchiolo – trumpet
- Yvette Devereaux – violin
- Ernie Ehrhardt – viola
- James Ford – trumpet
- Pam Gates – violin
- Songa Lee-Kitto – violin
- Valerie King – flute
- Marisa McLeod – violin
- Giovana Moraga – viola
- Patrick Morgan – viola
- Michele Nardonecelli – viola
- Cameron Patrick – viola
- Kathleen Robertson – violin
- Jimbo Ross – viola
- Nancy Stein-Ross – viola
- Mari Tsumura – violin

=== Personnel ===
- Jimmy Douglass – mixer, recorder
- Kaliq Glover – strings recorder
- Dave Hampton – technical director
- Lisa Hampton – Pro Tools engineer
- Danja – drums, keys producer, writer
- Beyoncé – additional vocals
- Timbaland – drums, keys, producer, recorder, writer
- Justin Timberlake - vocals, producer, writer
- Ethan Willoughby – additional Pro Tools engineer
- Benjamin Wright – conductor, strings arrangement

== Charts ==
=== Weekly charts ===
Weekly chart performance
Chart (2007–2008)	Peak position
CIS Airplay (TopHit)	88
Denmark (Tracklisten)	30
Netherlands (Dutch Tipparade 40)	9
New Zealand (Recorded Music NZ)	31
Romania (Romanian Top 100)	80
Sweden (Sverigetopplistan)	60
US Billboard Hot 100	17
US Adult R&B Songs (Billboard)	2
US Dance Airplay (Billboard)	11
US Dance Club Songs (Billboard)	17
US Hot R&B/Hip-Hop Songs (Billboard)	3
US Pop Airplay (Billboard)	26
US Rhythmic Airplay (Billboard)	12

=== Year-end charts ===
Year-end chart performance
Chart (2007)	Position
US Hot R&B/Hip-Hop Songs (Billboard)	11
Chart (2008)	Position
US Hot R&B/Hip-Hop Songs (Billboard)	35

=== Decade-end charts ===
Decade-end chart performance
Charts (2000–09)	Position
US Hot R&B/Hip-Hop Songs (Billboard)	20
US Mainstream R&B/Hip-Hop Airplay (Billboard)	46

== Certifications ==
Certifications
Region	Certification	Certified units/sales
New Zealand (RMNZ)	Platinum	30,000^{‡}
United States (RIAA)	Gold	500,000^{^}
^{^} Shipments figures based on certification alone.^{‡} Sales+streaming figures based on certification alone.

== Release history ==
Release dates and formats
Region	Date	Format	Label	Ref.
United States	November 13, 2007	12"	Jive	
Germany (Note: Released as a double A-side with "Summer Love".)	December 7, 2007	CD single	Sony	
United States	December 24, 2007	Digital download (Remixes)	Jive	
