= Torque (magazine) =

- Editor: Richard Puddle and Oliver Lewis
- Staff writers: Chris Dymond
- Categories: Motorsport
- Frequency: Monthly
- Publisher: The Race Drivers Academy
- First issue: September 2008
- Country: United Kingdom
- Based in: Silverstone
- Language: English
- Website: www.torque-online.co.uk

Torque magazine is a monthly motorsport magazine which is published by The Race Drivers Academy in the United Kingdom. It was first released in September 2008. The magazine's tag line is that it is 'By Drivers, For Drivers'. The magazine is written solely by racing drivers and includes interviews, guest columnists and articles written by other racing drivers. Whilst the main objective initially was to document news and mini biographies of The Race Drivers Academy's drivers, Torque has since attracted some top motorsport celebrities for interviews and its open stance on a number of issues has seen it become popular amongst hardcore racing fans. Torque prides itself in being open and honest in its views on the motorsport world.

== Torque Online ==
In October 2008, in addition to the monthly release of the magazine, Torque Online was launched to keep readers up to date with news, competitions and downloadable versions of the magazine. Torque Online is also the most popular method of subscribing to the publication.

== Editors ==
The two main editors of Torque are (were?) students of The Race Drivers Academy which is a company based at Silverstone. Both editors, Richard Puddle and Oliver Lewis, have raced at club and national level in saloon car and single seater racing, whilst contributary writer Chris Dymond, races a Jaguar XKR in FIA GT3.
