= My Love (Justin Timberlake song) =

2006 single by Justin Timberlake

Single by Justin Timberlake featuring T.I.

from the album FutureSex/LoveSounds
- B-side: "Let Me Talk to You (Prelude)/My Love"
- Released: October 24, 2006
- Studio: Conway (Hollywood); Thomas Crown (Virginia Beach)
- Genre: Electro-R&B; hip-hop; techno
- Length: 4:42 (single version); 4:36 (physical version); 6:10 (digital version w/ medley)
- Label: Jive
- Songwriters: Justin Timberlake; Tim Mosley; Nate "Danja" Hills; Clifford Joseph Harris
- Producers: Timbaland; Justin Timberlake; Nate "Danja" Hills

Justin Timberlake singles chronology
"SexyBack" (2006)	"My Love" (2006)	"Dick in a Box" (2006)

T.I. singles chronology
"Shoulder Lean" (2006)	"My Love" (2006)	"Live in the Sky" (2006)

Music video
- "My Love" on YouTube

"My Love" is a song by American singer Justin Timberlake featuring rapper T.I. from the former's second studio album, FutureSex/LoveSounds (2006). It was released by Jive Records as the second single from the album on October 24, 2006. The song features background vocals from Timbaland and was co-written by Timberlake, Timbaland, Nate "Danja" Hills, and T.I., and produced by Timberlake, Timbaland, and Danja.

Timberlake revealed that the song's creation process took time to imagine and execute. He also stated that "My Love" was less about marriage and a more humble approach to love. The song features synthesizer chords with a slow beat and includes beatboxing, percussion, and staccato sounds. Timberlake described the track as "a rock-techno ballad".

"My Love" reached number one on the US Billboard Hot 100, being Timberlake's second consecutive single to do so. Among other Billboard charts, it also topped the Mainstream Top 40, Hot Dance Airplay, and Hot Digital Songs charts. Internationally, the single peaked in the number two position on the UK Singles Chart, becoming Timberlake's fourth single to do so. In New Zealand, the track peaked at number one for five non-consecutive weeks, to become Timberlake's second number one single. In Brazil, the song has also peaked at number one.

Pitchfork named "My Love" as their number one song of 2006. Many have cited that the song was a sequel to Timberlake's 2002 song "Cry Me a River". The track won Best Rap/Sung Collaboration at the 2007 Grammy Awards. "My Love" also won Timberlake the Male Artist of the Year and Best Choreography in a Video at the 2007 MTV Video Music Awards.

== Background ==
In November 2002, Justin Timberlake released his debut solo album, Justified, which was a commercial success and received generally positive reviews from music critics. The album spawned four singles, including "Rock Your Body" and "Cry Me a River", which reached the top-five of the US Billboard Hot 100. After its release, Timberlake thought he "lost his voice" in the sense that he did not like what he was doing. He felt "burnt out" after Justified and he took a break from the music industry to become a film actor. His first role during this time was a journalist in the thriller Edison Force (2006). He also appeared in the 2006 films Alpha Dog, Black Snake Moan, and Southland Tales, and voiced Prince Artie Pendragon in the animated film Shrek the Third (2007).

When Timberlake felt inspired to compose songs again, he chose not to reunite with his former band NSYNC, though he considered it after his first record. Timberlake went to Justified collaborator Timbaland's new Thomas Crown Studios in Virginia Beach, Virginia, to begin sessions for his second album. Neither Timberlake nor Timbaland had any idea of what the album would be; there was no plan or title for it. In December 2005, Timberlake began working on his second album, FutureSex/LoveSounds, the follow-up to Justified (2002). Within three weeks, "My Love" was one of several songs that were recorded. In September 2006, Timberlake told Rolling Stone that the song was "a hip-hop ballad" and that the process of creating "took two hours to imagine and execute". While promoting the album in an interview with MTV News, Timberlake revealed that the second half of the album (including "My Love") focuses on anthems of love. In another interview, he revealed that "My Love" was a "contradiction of sounds. You've got this operatic thing going on. If you take all the staccato sounds out, the essence of the song is it's a ballad, but the way the beat is inlaid underneath the vocals, it becomes a percussive ballad."

In discussion of T.I.'s participation in the track, Timberlake said: "The second hook finished and I said, 'Oh, a rapper would sound good on this'." Timbaland, who co-wrote and produced the song, agreed to the idea and suggested T.I. Timberlake agreed to the idea, although he doubted that T.I. would say yes, and said that he was thankful that T.I. agreed to take part.

Timberlake revealed in 2013 that he originally asked rapper Jay-Z (whom he would collaborate with extensively in his later career) to appear on the track before T.I. "I wanted to do a record with him on FutureSex/LoveSounds ..." he explained "...and he at that time had done a record with Beyoncé, it was 'Déjà Vu.' And he said—respectfully, I can't knock him for saying like I have this one feature, I think he was working on his own music as well, so he didn't want to be on too many things. And I said, 'I totally respect that. I'm obviously not gonna get into any domestic anything. That's your wife.' But the record was 'My Love.' And it ended up being an interesting blessing in disguise because I thank Tip for that record—I mean, his verse is phenomenal."

== Music and lyrics ==
"My Love"
The music of "My Love" is built around a stuttering sounding trance-style synthesizer.

"My Love" is an electro-R&B, hip hop and techno ballad. The song is composed in the key of E minor, with a chord progression of E-minor-B-minor-A-minor. It is set in time signature of common time with a tempo of 121 beats per minute. The song is composed with a stuttering trance-style synthesizer. It also includes Timbaland beatboxing and adding "toy sounds", as well as Timberlake's falsetto. The track features a rap verse from rapper T.I. It also carries a slower beat, with an electro-Southern hip hop sound. The Guardian described the song as a "languid love ballad, prickling with dark emotion", while MTV News described the beat as "slow and saucy". Ben Williams of New York magazine wrote that it has "stabbing techno riff, crunched-together mouth-popping noises, and wailing opera singer". Alexis Petridis of The Guardian said that the single is "a twitching mass of rave synthesizers and [agonizingly] slow beats".

In July 2006, The Observer Music Monthly interviewed Timberlake and stated that the track "is arguably the album's 'Cry Me a River'." In response, Timberlake said, "It is similar. You go back to Aaliyah's biggest record, 'Are You That Somebody' – it's similar to that too because it's that percussive ballad." When asked about the lyrics, "There's just one thing I need from you: say I do", being autobiographical, he said no, adding that the line before that, "this ring here represents my heart", is about marriage and love. Timberlake stated, "It's not specifically about marriage, but about a humble approach to love. None of it is autobiographical, though obviously I have experience to draw from."

Williams stated that the song is "an obvious sequel" to Timberlake's 2002 song "Cry Me a River". The Georgia Straight's Martin Turenne interprets the song's background as Timberlake lowering himself on bended knee, proposing long walks on the beach and asking, "Would you date me on the regular?". Dagny Salas of North by Northwestern considered it a more romantic song, about Timberlake professing his love to a woman. Others have opined that "My Love" is a marriage proposal.

== Critical reception ==
A sort of hip-hop ballad with the inclusion of T.I.'s verse, this song crosses more than a few genre boundaries and was well-received. In typical Justin fashion, this track is smothered with falsetto notes that all come together to tell us a dreamy love tale.

— Complex staff in 2013.

In The New York Times review of the album, critic Kelefa Sanneh wrote: "...'My Love', a sumptuous collaboration with the rapper T.I. It starts with a 90-second 'prelude', a clattering rhythm track with a bit of rapping and snippets of melody. Then the real thing hits: sleek synthesizer chords punctuated by tiny bursts of silence." Sal Cinquemani of Slant Magazine wrote that the track "mixes Timberlake's proud beatboxing talent with colossal, futuristic synth swirls and a cartoonish, maniacal giggle that's looped ad infinitum a la the crying baby from Aaliyah's 'Are You That Somebody?'". Matthew Gasteier of Prefix magazine noted that the song "is probably the standout triumph here, with stuttering synths and a fade-in-fade-out shimmering beat that may be the best ever from Timbaland". Lauren Murphy of entertainment.ie stated that the single is "undeniably fluid and features some of the niftiest slo-mo effects around". Jonah Weiner of Blender magazine cited the song as the "standout" song from the album and wrote that the single "...straddles the album's up-tempo FutureSex and balladeering LoveSounds halves — one coos about puppy love over the other's stroboscopic, salivating beat, and both trade devotionals on the chorus". VH1's Emily Exton in a 2013 article said that in the song Timberlake "reinvents mainstream pop music and increases his artistic credibility at the same time. The song is more sonically futuristic than others."

"My Love" was criticized for some of the lyrics and sounds that were featured. Sanneh reported that Timberlake "exhales his clumsy pickup lines" with the lyrics "If I told you you were beautiful / Would you date me on the regular?". Murphy contemplated that the song is "ultimately ruined" by a "bizarre Crazy Frog-meets-Laughing-Policeman underlay". Emily Vaughan of North by Northwestern commented that Timberlake claims to have gone around the world twice in "My Love" and "Damn Girl" and that he is also "running out of creative ways to say he would like you to go to bed with him". Vaughan, however, was positive towards "My Love", stating that the song, along with "What Goes Around... Comes Around", sounded considerably different from the rest of the album.

== Accolades ==
The song was picked by Pitchfork as their number one song of 2006, also ranking the song at 26 on "The Top 500 Tracks of the 2000s." "At the 49th Grammy Awards, "My Love" won a Grammy Award in the category of Best Rap/Sung Collaboration. The song was covered by Irish band The Coronas, and by British group Klaxons on BBC Radio 1's Live Lounge and was included in the B-side of their song "It's Not Over Yet", which was released in June 2007. The Village Voice's Pazz & Jop annual critics' poll voted "My Love" as the fourth best single of 2006; Timberlake's "SexyBack" and T.I.'s "What You Know" were voted on the same poll at numbers seven and two, respectively.

Additionally, the song won ASCAP Pop Music Awards in the category Most Performed Songs in 2007 and 2008, an ASCAP Rhythm & Soul Award in 2008, a BMI Urban Award in 2007, and a BMI Pop Award in 2008.

== Commercial performance ==
"My Love" was commercially successful in the United States. The single debuted at number 89 on September 23, 2006, on the Billboard Hot 100, prior to its physical release. From number five on November 11, 2006, it propelled to number one the following week. "My Love" became Timberlake's second consecutive number one hit on the Billboard Hot 100 from his FutureSex/LoveSounds album, becoming the first male artist since Usher in 2004 to have three or more consecutive number one hits from one album. The single peaked at number one on the Hot 100 for three consecutive weeks. In addition to the Hot 100, "My Love" also reached number one on the following Billboard charts: Pop 100, Hot Dance Airplay and Top 40 mainstream charts, and has peaked at number three on the Rhythmic Top 40. Also, on the Hot R&B/Hip-Hop Songs, "My Love" peaked at number two to become Timberlake's most successful single on this chart. The song also charted on the Hot Dance Club Play and Hot Adult Top 40 Tracks charts, peaking at number 15 and number 29, respectively. "My Love" was certified Platinum by the RIAA on February 26, 2007, and has sold 2.5 million copies in the US as of February 2018.

In the United Kingdom, "My Love" debuted at number 14 on the UK Singles Chart on November 12, 2006 (for the week ending date November 18, 2006), one week prior to its physical release, and ascended to its peak the following week at number 2 (having been beaten to the summit by Akon and Eminem's "Smack That"; the reverse happened on the US chart), to become Timberlake's fourth single to reach the runner up position on the British charts. The digital download sales helped propel the single to number two on November 20, 2006. The song spent nineteen weeks within the top 75, retiring on March 24, 2007, spending four of those within the top ten. The single entered the top five in Germany, Switzerland, Sweden, and Finland, and entered the top ten in France and Austria. In Australia, "My Love" debuted and peaked at number four on the Australian ARIA singles chart on November 26, 2006, gaining the Highest Debut certification. It spent a total of twenty-four weeks on the chart. "My Love" was certified Gold by Australian Recording Industry Association (ARIA). In New Zealand, the single debuted at number 25 and eventually peaked at number one for five non-consecutive weeks, to become Timberlake's second number one single.

== Music video ==
The music video for "My Love" was directed by Paul Hunter and premiered on the day before the single's release. The video includes the prelude to the song ("Let Me Talk to You"), which includes the song's producer, Timbaland and features T.I. The video incorporates a black-and-white background and dancing, choreographed as the steps are in sync with the beat of the song.

Timberlake with a female dancer in the music video.

The video starts with "Let Me Talk to You" as the background is surrounded by faulty fluorescent lighting, turning on and off in a programmed pattern. It also begins with Timberlake and Timbaland chanting "hey" to one another. The video proceeds with Timberlake dancing to the beat of the song. Timbaland then begins singing the first verse of the song, which then is proceeded by Timberlake. This is immediately followed with "My Love" playing; the first verse of the song, "Ain't another woman that could take your spot my", plays. Timberlake comes floating toward the camera, down the faulty fluorescent tube. Once Timberlake stops floating, he begins singing the main verse of the song, which violins begin to float swirling gently around him, for "If I wrote you a symphony / Just to say how much you mean to me". The scene then changes with Timberlake and various dancers dancing accordingly in a choreographed style. When Timberlake begins the second verse, "Now if I wrote you a love note / And made you smile at every word I wrote", pens and paper begin to float. This later exceeds with Timberlake singing "This ring here represents my heart" with a ring swirling into the camera. T.I. is then seen in the shot. T.I. begins rapping his lines in the song. After T.I. finishes his verse, Timberlake is then seen dancing with a female back-up dancer. Though, as they continue dancing, the female then leaves the shot, leaving Timberlake to dance to the end of the song. In the closing moments, the camera swirls around him, proving, conclusively, from every angle, that everyone has gone.

At the 2007 MTV Video Music Awards, Timberlake won Male Artist of the Year for "Let Me Talk to You/My Love", "SexyBack", and "What Goes Around ... / ... Comes Around". He, alongside choreographers Blake Anthony and Marty Kudelka, won Best Choreography in a Video for "My Love".

The music video on YouTube has received over 100 million views as of September 2026.

== Live performances ==
Timberlake performed "My Love" and "SexyBack" as a medley for the opening of the 2006 MTV Video Music Awards, and again for the MTV Europe Music Awards 2006, which he also hosted. He also performed the song on Saturday Night Live (SNL). Timberlake, alongside Robyn Troup and T.I., performed the song live at the 49th Grammy Awards. In addition, he performed the song at the Victoria's Secret Fashion Show. The song was part of the set list of his second worldwide tour FutureSex/LoveShow.

"My Love" was performed by Timberlake at the 2013 MTV Video Music Awards on August 25 as part of a medley. The song is featured on Timberlake's Legends of the Summer Stadium Tour with rapper Jay-Z (2013), The 20/20 Experience World Tour (2013/15), The Man of the Woods Tour (2018/19), and The Forget Tomorrow World Tour (2024/25). On January 10, 2019, in Atlanta, T.I. joined him on stage to perform the song. Moreover, he performed a medley of his own songs: "What You Know"/"Bring Em Out"/"Live Your Life."

== Track listings ==
European CD single and digital download

1. "My Love" – 4:41
2. "My Love" (Instrumental) – 4:38

Australian CD maxi single

1. "My Love" – 4:41
2. "Let Me Talk to You (Prelude)/My Love" – 6:11
3. "SexyBack" (Armand's Mix) – 7:12
4. "SexyBack" (Dean Coleman Silent Sound Beatdown) – 6:23

UK CD maxi single

1. "My Love" – 4:41
2. "My Love" (Paul Oakenfold Radio Edit) – 3:46
3. "My Love" (Pokerface House Remix) – 5:52
4. "My Love" (Paul Jackson Remix) – 6:30
5. "My Love" (Linus Loves Remix) – 5:07
6. "My Love" (Video) – 6:11

German CD maxi single

1. "My Love" – 4:41
2. "My Love" (Paul Oakenfold Radio Edit) – 3:46
3. "My Love" (Linus Loves Remix) – 5:07
4. "My Love" (Paul Jackson Version Excursion) – 6:30

Digital download (The Remixes)

1. "My Love" (Paul Oakenfold Radio Edit) – 3:43
2. "My Love" (Ibiza Is Burning Radio Edit) – 4:07
3. "My Love" (Linus Loves Remix) – 5:08
4. "My Love" (Steve Angello & Sebastian Ingrosso Mix) – 10:13
5. "My Love" (Ibiza Is Burning Mix) – 8:23

US 12-inch vinyl (Remixes)

1. "My Love" (Paul Oakenfold Mix) – 6:22
2. "My Love" (Ibiza Is Burning Mix) – 8:22
3. "My Love" (Steve Angello & Sebastian Ingrosso Mix) – 10:14

UK 12-inch vinyl

1. "My Love" – 4:41
2. "My Love" (Instrumental) – 4:38
3. "Let Me Talk to You (Prelude)/My Love" – 6:11
4. "My Love" (Instrumental) – 4:38

UK 12-inch vinyl (Remixes)

1. "My Love" (The DFA Remix) – 8:43
2. "My Love" (Linus Loves Remix) – 5:07
3. "My Love" (Steve Angello & Sebastian Ingrosso Mix) – 10:16
4. "My Love" (Paul Oakenfold Remix) – 6:28

== Charts ==
=== Weekly charts ===
Weekly chart performance for "My Love"
Chart (2006–2007)	Peak position
Australia (ARIA)	3
Australian Urban (ARIA)	1
Austria (Ö3 Austria Top 40)	6
Belgium (Ultratop 50 Flanders)	16
Belgium (Ultratop 50 Wallonia)	17
Canada Hot 100 (Billboard)	43
Canada CHR/Top 40 (Billboard)	1
Canada Hot AC (Billboard)	28
CIS Airplay (TopHit)	15
Czech Republic Airplay (ČNS IFPI)	9
Denmark (Tracklisten)	3
Europe (Eurochart Hot 100)	3
Finland (Suomen virallinen lista)	5
France (SNEP)	10
Germany (GfK)	4
Hungary (Rádiós Top 40)	5
Hungary (Dance Top 40)	24
Ireland (IRMA)	4
Italy (FIMI)	12
Netherlands (Dutch Top 40)	12
Netherlands (Single Top 100)	19
New Zealand (Recorded Music NZ)	1
Romania (Romanian Top 100)	21
Russia Airplay (TopHit)	13
Scottish Singles Sales (Official Charts)	7
Slovakia Airplay (ČNS IFPI)	11
Sweden (Sverigetopplistan)	2
Switzerland (Schweizer Hitparade)	2
UK Singles (Official Charts)	2
UK Airplay (Music Week)	6
UK Hip Hop/R&B (Official Charts)	2
US Billboard Hot 100	1
US Adult Pop Airplay (Billboard)	27
US Dance Airplay (Billboard)	1
US Dance Club Songs (Billboard)	15
US Hot R&B/Hip-Hop Songs (Billboard)	2
US Pop Airplay (Billboard)	1
US Rhythmic Airplay (Billboard)	3

=== Year-end charts ===
2006 year-end chart performance for "My Love"
Chart (2006)	Position
Australia (ARIA)	35
Australian Urban (ARIA)	17
CIS (TopHit)	180
Europe (Eurochart Hot 100)	87
Germany (Media Control GfK)	84
Sweden (Hitlistan)	13
Switzerland (Schweizer Hitparade)	44
UK Singles (OCC)	55
UK Airplay (Music Week)	72
UK Urban (Music Week)	22
US Billboard Hot 100	61

2007 year-end chart performance for "My Love"
Chart (2007)	Position
Australia (ARIA)	61
Austria (Ö3 Austria Top 40)	55
Belgium (Ultratop 50 Flanders)	93
Belgium (Ultratop 50 Wallonia)	77
Brazil (Crowley Charts)	18
CIS (TopHit)	83
Europe (Eurochart Hot 100)	32
Germany (Media Control GfK)	53
Hungary (Rádiós Top 40)	30
Russia Airplay (TopHit)	100
Sweden (Sverigetopplistan)	62
Switzerland (Schweizer Hitparade)	42
UK Urban (Music Week)	17
US Billboard Hot 100	26
US Hot Dance Airplay (Billboard)	7
US Hot R&B/Hip-Hop Songs (Billboard)	34
US Rhythmic Airplay (Billboard)	35

=== All-time charts ===
Decade-end chart performance for "My Love"
Chart (1958–2018)	Position
US Mainstream Top 40 (Billboard)	91

== Certifications ==
Certifications and sales for "My Love"
Region	Certification	Certified units/sales
Australia (ARIA)	2× Platinum	140,000^{^}
Brazil (Pro-Música Brasil)	Platinum	60,000^{‡}
Canada (Music Canada)	2× Platinum	80,000^{*}
Germany (BVMI)	Gold	150,000^{‡}
New Zealand (RMNZ)	4× Platinum	120,000^{‡}
United Kingdom (BPI)	Platinum	600,000^{‡}
United States (RIAA)	Platinum	2,500,000
United States (RIAA) Mastertone	Platinum	1,000,000^{*}
^{*} Sales figures based on certification alone.^{^} Shipments figures based on certification alone.^{‡} Sales+streaming figures based on certification alone.

== Release history ==
Release dates and formats for "My Love"
Region	Date	Format	Label	Ref.
United States	October 24, 2006	Digital download	Jive	
Germany	November 3, 2006	CD single	Jive	
Australia	November 13, 2006	CD single	Jive	
United Kingdom	November 13, 2006	CD single	Jive	
United States	November 14, 2006	12-inch single	Jive	
