= LoveStoned =

2007 single by Justin Timberlake

Single by Justin Timberlake

from the album FutureSex/LoveSounds
- Released: June 29, 2007
- Studio: Thomas Crown (Virginia Beach); The Studio (Philadelphia)
- Genre: R&B; art rock
- Length: 7:24 (album version); 5:27 (radio edit)
- Label: Jive; Zomba
- Songwriters: Justin Timberlake; Tim Mosley; Nate "Danja" Hills
- Producers: Timbaland; Justin Timberlake; Nate "Danja" Hills

Justin Timberlake singles chronology
"Summer Love" (2007)	"LoveStoned" (2007)	"Ayo Technology" (2007)

Music video
- "LoveStoned" on YouTube

"LoveStoned" (also known as "LoveStoned/I Think She Knows") is a song by American singer-songwriter Justin Timberlake from his second studio album, FutureSex/LoveSounds (2006). It was released on June 29, 2007. It was written and produced by Timberlake, Timothy "Timbaland" Mosley and Nate "Danja" Hills. Unlike the rest of the album, which focuses on themes of sexual innuendos, "LoveStoned" contains sexually suggestive lyrics. Musically, "LoveStoned" is an upbeat dance song, contrasting with the interlude of "I Think She Knows," which has a slower, quieter, guitar-driven sound. The song won the Grammy Award for Best Dance Recording at the 2008 ceremony. The official remixes by Justice, Tiësto and Kaskade was released later.

== Background and release ==
In November 2002, Justin Timberlake released his debut solo album, Justified, which was a commercial success and received generally positive reviews from music critics. The album spawned four singles, including the US top-five singles "Rock Your Body" and "Cry Me a River". After its release, Timberlake thought he "lost his voice" in the sense that he did not like what he was doing. He felt "burnt-out" after Justified and he took a break from the music industry to become a film actor. His first role during this time was a journalist in the thriller Edison Force (2006). He also appeared in the 2006 films Alpha Dog, Black Snake Moan, and Southland Tales, and voiced Prince Artie Pendragon in the animated film Shrek the Third (2007).

When Timberlake felt inspired to compose songs again, he chose not to reunite with his former band NSYNC, though considered it after his first record. Timberlake went to Justified collaborator Timbaland's new Thomas Crown Studios in Virginia Beach, Virginia, to begin sessions for his second album. Neither Timberlake nor Timbaland had any idea of what the album would be; there was no plan or title for it. "LoveStoned / I Think She Knows" was written by Justin Timberlake, Timbaland, and Nate "Danja" Hills as a sexual love song. In an interview with MTV News, while promoting his second album, FutureSex/LoveSounds, Timberlake revealed that the first half of the album generally focuses on sex. "LoveStoned" contains sexually suggestive lyrics, with the line, "She's going home with me tonight". "LoveStoned" was originally scheduled to be released to mainstream radio in the United States in April 2007.

== Composition ==
"LoveStoned"
A 31-second sample of "LoveStoned".

"LoveStoned/I Think She Knows" begins as an R&B song before segueing into art rock around the five-minute mark." The song is composed in the key of F minor and is set in a time signature of common time with a tempo of 120 beats per minute. The first part of the song, "LoveStoned", starts with "a boast" and the interlude "I Think She Knows" transitions into "an adoring two-minute love song about someone special". The song also includes "human beatbox sounds". The musicscape features string arrangements on both songs and includes Timberlake's "famous falsetto". In an interview with Rolling Stone, Timberlake admitted that the "drony guitar interlude" featured in "I Think She Knows" was inspired by the alternative rock band Interpol. The Guardian's Alexis Petridis said of the unexpected shift in tone, "the sweaty, slap-bass funk vanishes, in favour of vigorously strummed, vaguely Sonic Youth-ish guitars, luscious strings and a gorgeous Kraftwerk-inspired counter-melody." Martin Turenne of The Georgia Straight described "LoveStoned" as "a space-age disco track in which he [Timberlake] rhapsodizes about a statuesque goddess who casts a lustfully narcotic spell, leaving him defenceless against her predatory wiles". Russell Baillie of The New Zealand Herald reported that the song has a "prowling funk" sound. Jon Pareles of The New York Times noted that the sound was similar to recording artist Michael Jackson's 1983 song "Billie Jean". Pareles concluded that the track's "pulsating guitar arrangement" was similar to rock band U2.

Christy Lemire of the Associated Press described the theme of the song as, "Justin sees a gorgeous girl on the floor and longs to bring her back to the VIP Room and/or just cut to the chase and take her directly home". Barry Schwartz of Stylus Magazine interpreted Timberlake's point of view, citing that "LoveStoned" is "high from sex". Cameron Adams of the Herald Sun said that FutureSex/LoveSounds is a "bedroom" album and includes "LoveStoned" as part of it. Turenne concluded that the single is not just a song, "it's the start of an S&M porno script".

== Critical reception ==
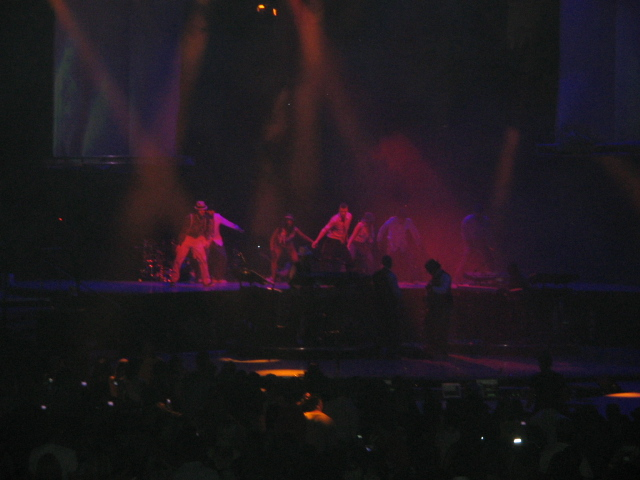
Timberlake performing "LoveStoned" during his 2007 FutureSex/LoveShow concert tour.

In the Entertainment Weekly review of the album, critic Chris Willman wrote: "Superior tracks, like 'LoveStoned' and 'What Comes Around', suggest a happy middle path, where Timberlake can equally embrace Timbaland's canny beats and his own vocal helium." Tim Finney of Pitchfork described the song as "brilliantly ... tight, clipped disco funk" and went on to say that it "descends precipitously into the gorgeous melancholy of 'I Think That She Knows', all MOR-rock guitar churn and weightless strings, the same chorus ... transformed from infatuation to the paranoid and elegiac admission of an addict". Lauren Murphy of Entertainment.ie noted "LoveStoned" as excellent and "a sexy, layered affair with inspired violin intervals, and the consecutive interlude is a classy sliver of deftly-produced pop". Lucy Davies of BBC Music wrote: "'LoveStoned' is a great track, with chopping violins, beatboxing, and bongos. 'I Think She Knows', the interlude which follows, is quite beautiful, shimmering, and brilliantly constructed." Jonah Weiner of Blender wrote, "From the grinding 'SexyBack' to the percolating 'LoveStoned' ... the vibe is all infectious, feverish build-up." Rolling Stone believed that "LoveStoned/I Think She Knows" was the "madcap peak" of the "historic creative roll" of Timberlake and Timbaland, describing the song as "flowing from hip-hop bump-and-grind to an ambient wash of Interpol-inspired guitar drone."

At the 50th Grammy Awards, "LoveStoned" won a Grammy Award in the category of Best Dance Recording. It was ranked at the number four spot on Entertainment Weekly's "Best Songs of 2007".

French electronic duo Justice released a remixed version of "LoveStoned" in July 2007. Dutch musician Tiësto was asked to remix "LoveStoned" and released his version of the song on his weekly radio show titled Tiësto's Club Life, which he then later released on iTunes. Guitarist Kaki King recorded a cover portion of "I Think She Knows" for Engine Room Recordings' compilation album Guilt by Association Vol. 2, which was released in November 2008. "Penn Masala", the popular South Asian fusion a cappella group, recorded an a cappella cover of "LoveStoned" fused with the song "Ya Ali" from the Bollywood film Gangster. The song was chosen for Best of A Cappella (BOCA) 2010.

== Commercial performance ==
In North America, the single was officially solicited to radio in June 2007. "LoveStoned" appeared on the Billboard Hot 100 and debuted at number 85, at number 17 on the Hot Digital Songs chart. It appeared on Billboard's Pop 100 in the number seven position. "LoveStoned/I Think She Knows" reached the number one spot on Billboard's Hot Dance Club Play and Hot Dance Airplay. Upon release, "LoveStoned/I Think She Knows" was downloaded 39,000 times on iTunes as of February 2007. As of 2018, the song has sold 1.12 million copies in the country.

The track peaked within the top ten in nine countries. "LoveStoned" appeared in the UK Singles Chart on June 23, 2007, in the number 63 position. It peaked at number 11, spent nineteen weeks on the chart, before retiring at number 95. The song attained top five positions in the Netherlands, South Africa, and Turkey, and entered the top ten in Denmark, Finland, Italy, and Sweden.

== Music video ==
Directed by Robert Hales, filming for the music video took place at Web Studios in Salford, England. In order for the lighting effects, Timberlake and Hales were required to use 600 kilowatts of lighting power, the most the studios ever used. Visual effects for the video were produced by the multi-disciplinary design studio, Blind.

In the video, Timberlake is depicted as a blue frequency. Throughout this portion of the video, a woman and a heart are also seen in this form. Midway through the song, Timberlake is seen playing an electric guitar. Also, the first half of the "I Think She Knows Interlude" is cut out in the video. At the end, Timberlake is shown singing against a white background, with electronic pulses travelling along the hills behind him, symbolising his trance-like state of mind.

The video for "LoveStoned/I Think She Knows" premiered on Yahoo! Music on June 13, 2007, and on MuchMusic's MuchOnDemand on June 14, 2007. Total Request Live (TRL) premiered the video on June 18, and it debuted at number nine on June 19.

== Live performances ==
Timberlake performed "LoveStoned" live at the MTV Europe Music Awards 2006 at the 2007 MTV Video Music Awards. and again at the Victoria's Secret Fashion Show. It was also part of the set list for FutureSex/LoveShow (2007), Legends of the Summer Stadium Tour with rapper Jay-Z (2013), The 20/20 Experience World Tour (2013–15), The Man of the Woods Tour (2018–19), and The Forget Tomorrow World Tour (2024–2025).

== Charts ==
=== Weekly charts ===
Weekly chart performance for "LoveStoned"
Chart (2007)	Peak position
Australia (ARIA)	11
Australian Dance (ARIA)	2
Austria (Ö3 Austria Top 40)	21
Belgium (Ultratop 50 Flanders)	14
Belgium (Ultratop 50 Wallonia)	29
Canada Hot 100 (Billboard)	5
Canada CHR/Top 40 (Billboard)	2
Canada Hot AC (Billboard)	3
CIS Airplay (TopHit)	25
Czech Republic Airplay (ČNS IFPI)	17
Denmark (Tracklisten)	12
Europe (Eurochart Hot 100)	14
Finland (Suomen virallinen lista)	7
France (SNEP)	28
Germany (GfK)	15
Hungary (Rádiós Top 40)	4
Hungary (Dance Top 40)	13
Ireland (IRMA)	12
Italy (FIMI)	10
Netherlands (Dutch Top 40)	5
Netherlands (Single Top 100)	8
New Zealand (Recorded Music NZ)	17
Russia Airplay (TopHit)	30
Slovakia Airplay (ČNS IFPI)	22
Sweden (Sverigetopplistan)	9
Switzerland (Schweizer Hitparade)	19
UK Singles (Official Charts)	11
UK Airplay (Music Week)	4
US Billboard Hot 100	17
US Adult Pop Airplay (Billboard)	28
US Dance Club Songs (Billboard)	1
US Dance Airplay (Billboard)	1
US Pop Airplay (Billboard)	4
US Rhythmic Airplay (Billboard)	26

=== Year-end charts ===
Year-end chart performance for "LovedStoned"
Chart (2007)	Position
Australia (ARIA)	75
Belgium (Ultratop 50 Flanders)	60
CIS (TopHit)	97
Europe (Eurochart Hot 100)	89
Hungary (Rádiós Top 40)	36
Netherlands (Dutch Top 40)	21
Netherlands (Single Top 100)	63
Russia Airplay (TopHit)	129
Switzerland (Schweizer Hitparade)	96
US Billboard Hot 100	96
US Dance Club Play (Billboard)	49
US Hot Dance Airplay (Billboard)	18

Chart (2008)	Position
Hungary (Rádiós Top 40)	60

== Certifications and sales ==
Region	Certification	Certified units/sales
Australia (ARIA)	Platinum	70,000^{‡}
Denmark (IFPI Danmark)	Gold	7,500^{^}
France	—	15,848
New Zealand (RMNZ)	Gold	15,000^{‡}
United Kingdom (BPI)	Silver	200,000^{‡}
United States (RIAA)	Gold	1,120,000
^{^} Shipments figures based on certification alone.^{‡} Sales+streaming figures based on certification alone.

== Release history ==
Release dates and formats for "LoveStoned"
Region	Date	Format	Label	Ref.
France	June 29, 2007	Digital download	Sony	
United Kingdom	June 29, 2007	Digital download	RCA	
United States	July 10, 2007	Rhythmic radio	Jive	
United States	July 17, 2007	Mainstream radio	Jive	
Germany	July 20, 2007	CD single	Sony	
Germany	July 20, 2007	Maxi single	Sony	
United States	August 7, 2007	12-inch single	Jive	
Canada	August 14, 2007	12-inch single	Sony	
France	September 11, 2007	Digital download — Remixes	Sony	
United Kingdom	September 11, 2007	Digital download — Remixes	RCA	
United States	September 11, 2007	Digital download — Remixes	Jive	
Germany	January 22, 2008	12-inch single	Sony	

== See also ==
- List of number-one dance singles of 2007 (U.S.)
