= Tennessee House of Representatives 83rd district =

State legislative district in Tennessee

Tennessee's 83rd State House of Representatives district
- Map of Tennessee House districts with the 83rd District shaded in red
Representative
Mark White; R–Memphis
- Demographics: 63.6% White; 22.6% Black; 4.6% Hispanic; 5.5% Asian; 0.5% Other; 3% Multiracial
- Population (2024): 70,002

The Tennessee House of Representatives 83rd district is one of 99 legislative districts in the Tennessee House of Representatives. The district represents part of southeast Shelby County. It includes the city of Germantown, and portions of Memphis as well as part of Cordova. It has been represented by Mark White since 2010. The district is considered slightly competitive. In 2024, Donald Trump won the district by 8%

== Demographics ==
The Tennessee Comptroller estimates the population as of 2024 at 70,002.

- 63.6% of the district is White
- 22.6% of the district is African American
- 4.6% of the district is Hispanic
- 5.5% of the district is Asian
- 0.5% of the district is some other race
- 3% of the district is Two or more races

Detailed demographic information is available through Census Reporter as well.

== List of representatives ==
Representative	Party	Years of service	General Assembly	Residence
Mark White	Republican	2010–present	106th-114th	Memphis
Brian Kelsey	Republican	2005–2009	104th-105th	Germantown
Joe Kent	Republican	1983–2004	93rd-103rd	Memphis
Barry Sterling	Republican	1979–1982	91st-92nd	Memphis

== Electoral history ==
=== 2024 ===
2024 Tennessee House of Representatives election, District 83
Party	Candidate	Votes	%
Republican	Mark White (incumbent)	19,910	57.88
Democratic	Noah Nordstrom	14,488	42.12
Total votes		34,398	100.00

=== 2022 ===
2022 Tennessee House of Representatives election, District 83
Party	Candidate	Votes	%
Republican	Mark White (incumbent)	17,231	100.00
Total votes		17,231	100.00

=== 2020 ===
2020 Tennessee House of Representatives election, District 83
Party	Candidate	Votes	%
Republican	Mark White (Incumbent)	17,738	53.96
Democratic	Jerri Green	15,136	46.04
Total votes		32,874	100.00

=== 2018 ===
2018 Tennessee House of Representatives election, District 83
Party	Candidate	Votes	%
Republican	Mark White	15,163	56.81
Democratic	Danielle Schonbaum	11,526	43.19
Total votes		26,689	100.00

=== 2016 ===
2016 Tennessee House of Representatives election, District 83
Party	Candidate	Votes	%
Republican	Mark White (incumbent)	16,900	64.00
Democratic	Lawrence A. Pivnick	9,506	36.00
Total votes		26,406	100.00

=== 2014 ===
2014 Tennessee House of Representatives election, District 83
Party	Candidate	Votes	%
Republican	Mark White (incumbent)	14,699	100.00
Total votes		14,699	100.00

=== 2012 ===
2012 Tennessee House of Representatives election, District 83
Party	Candidate	Votes	%
Republican	Mark White (Incumbent)	21,358	100.00
Total votes		21,358	100.00

=== 2010 ===
2010 Tennessee House of Representatives election, District 83
Party	Candidate	Votes	%
Republican	Mark White	15,925	100.00
Total votes		15,925	100.00

=== 2008 ===
2008 Tennessee House of Representatives election, District 83
Party	Candidate	Votes	%
Republican	Brian Kelsey (incumbent)	20,592	100.00
Total votes		20,592	100.00

=== 2006 ===
2006 Tennessee House of Representatives election, District 83
Party	Candidate	Votes	%
Republican	Brian Kelsey (incumbent)	17,292	100.00
Total votes		17,292	100.00

=== 2004 ===
2004 Tennessee House of Representatives election, District 83
Party	Candidate	Votes	%
Republican	Brian Kelsey	19,409	74.86
Democratic	Julian J. Prewitt	6,518	25.14
Total votes		25,927	100.00

=== 2002 ===
2002 Tennessee House of Representatives election, District 83
Party	Candidate	Votes	%
Republican	Joe Kent	15,156	79.95
Independent	Matt Holladay	3,783	19.95
Write-in		17	0.09
Total votes		18,956	100.00

=== 2000 ===
2000 Tennessee House of Representatives election, District 83
Party	Candidate	Votes	%
Republican	Joe Kent	15,498	99.9
Write-in		11	0.1
Total votes		15,509	100.00
