= Justin Timberlake =

American singer, songwriter, and actor (born 1981)

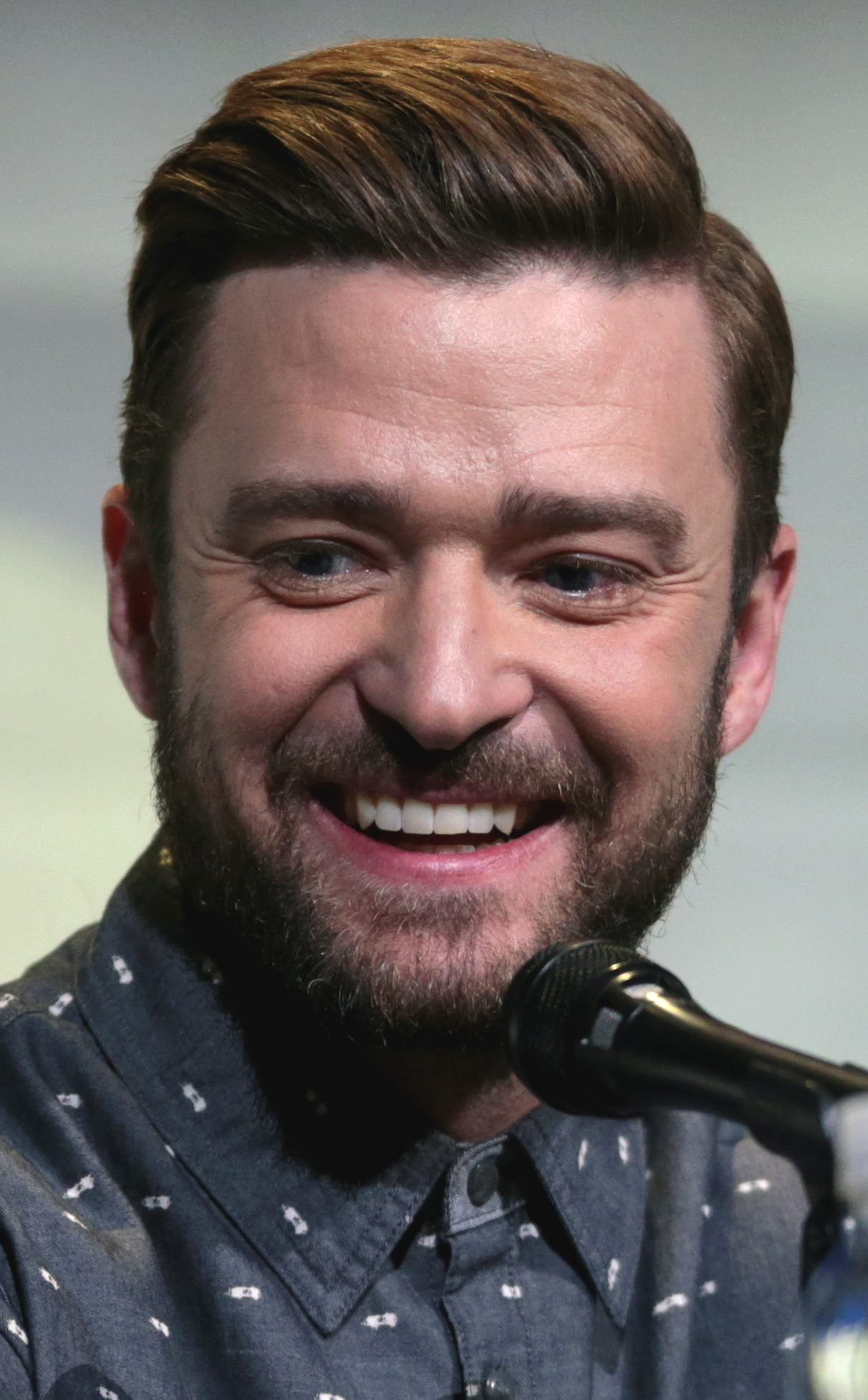
- Timberlake in 2016
- Born: Justin Randall Timberlake; January 31, 1981 (age 45); Memphis, Tennessee, U.S.
- Other name: JT
- Occupations: Singer; songwriter; dancer; actor; record producer
- Years active: 1992–present
- Agent: Johnny Wright
- Works: Discography; live performances; production; videography
- Spouse: Jessica Biel (m. 2012)
- Children: 2
- Awards: Full list
- Musical career
- Genres: Pop; R&B
- Instruments: Vocals; guitar; keyboards
- Labels: Jive; Zomba; RCA; Tennman
- Formerly of: NSYNC
- Website: justintimberlake.com

Justin Randall Timberlake (born January 31, 1981) is an American singer, songwriter, actor, and record producer. Dubbed the "Prince of Pop", he is known for his showmanship, tenor vocal range, versatility across the entertainment industry, and frequent collaborations with hip-hop producers such as The Neptunes and Timbaland.

As a child, Timberlake appeared on the competition show Star Search and was a cast member on Disney Channel's The All New Mickey Mouse Club (1993–1995). He rose to fame in the late 1990s as a member of NSYNC, one of the best-selling boy bands of all time. His first two solo albums, Justified (2002) and FutureSex/LoveSounds (2006), both sold over 10 million copies worldwide. The latter became his first to debut atop the US Billboard 200 and produced the US Billboard Hot 100 chart-topping singles "SexyBack", "My Love", and "What Goes Around... Comes Around". Timberlake scored his fourth US number-one single with a feature on Timbaland's "Give It to Me", before landing roles in the films Shrek the Third (2007), The Love Guru (2008), The Social Network (2010), Bad Teacher, Friends with Benefits and In Time (all 2011).

Timberlake's next three albums―The 20/20 Experience, The 20/20 Experience – 2 of 2 (both 2013), and Man of the Woods (2018)―all peaked atop the Billboard 200; the first of these became the best-selling album of 2013 in the United States. In 2016, he began voicing Branch with the first film of the Trolls franchise. "Can't Stop the Feeling!", a song from its soundtrack, became his fifth US number-one single and earned him an Academy Award nomination. His sixth album, Everything I Thought It Was (2024), peaked in the top five. Timberlake also continued his film career, with roles in Wonder Wheel (2017), Palmer (2021) and Reptile (2023).

Timberlake has received numerous accolades, including ten Grammy Awards, four Primetime Emmy Awards, three Brit Awards, nine Billboard Music Awards, seven American Music Awards and eleven MTV Video Music Awards (including the Michael Jackson Video Vanguard Award). He is one of the best-selling music artists of all time. Time named him one of the 100 most influential people in the world in 2007 and 2013. In 2019, Timberlake received the Contemporary Icon Award by the Songwriters Hall of Fame and an honorary Doctor of Music degree from Berklee College of Music. He also has a star on the Hollywood Walk of Fame as a member of NSYNC. Billboard ranked him among the Greatest Pop Stars of the 21st Century in 2024.

== Life and career ==
=== Early life ===
Justin Randall Timberlake was born on January 31, 1981, in Memphis, Tennessee, the son of Janet Lynn (née Bomar) Harless and Charles Randall Timberlake, a Baptist church choir director. Timberlake has two half-brothers, Jonathan and Stephen, from Charles' second marriage to Lisa Perry. His half-sister Laura Katherine died shortly after birth in 1997 and is mentioned in his acknowledgments in the album NSYNC as "My Angel in Heaven".

His family circle includes several musicians; his grandfather introduced him to music from country music artists like Johnny Cash and Willie Nelson. Performing as a child, Timberlake sang in a church choir; at the age of 11, he appeared on the television show Star Search, performing country songs as "Justin Randall". By that time, he began listening to rhythm and blues musicians from the 1960s and 1970s, such as Al Green, Stevie Wonder, and Marvin Gaye. He had listening sessions with his father of albums by the Eagles and Bob Seger.

From 1993 to 1995, he was a Mouseketeer on The All New Mickey Mouse Club, where his castmates included future girlfriend and singer Britney Spears, future tourmate Christina Aguilera, future bandmate JC Chasez, and future actors Ryan Gosling and Keri Russell. In 1995, Timberlake recruited Chasez to be in an all-male singing group, put together and financed by boy band manager Lou Pearlman, that eventually became NSYNC.

=== 1995–2002: NSYNC ===
The boy band NSYNC formed in 1995, and they began recording and performing in 1996 in Europe; Timberlake and Chasez served as its two lead singers. In 1998, the group rose to prominence in the United States with the release of their self-titled debut album, which sold 11 million copies and includes the single "Tearin' Up My Heart". The group had a series of legal battles with former manager Lou Pearlman, and they subsequently signed with Jive Records. They released their third album, No Strings Attached (2000), which sold 2.4 million copies in the first week, becoming the fastest-selling album of all time. They held this record until 2015, when Adele surpassed the record with her third album, 25. No Strings Attached also includes the number one singles "It's Gonna Be Me", "Bye Bye Bye", and "This I Promise You". The same year, Timberlake made his film debut in The Wonderful World of Disney film Model Behavior. He played Jason Sharpe, a model who falls in love with a waitress after mistaking her for another model. He also appeared as a young Elton John in the video for John's song "This Train Don't Stop There Anymore" the following year. NSYNC's fourth album, Celebrity (2001), was also financially successful, selling 1.8 million copies in the first week and spawning the top-five single "Girlfriend". Upon the completion of the Celebrity Tour, the group went on an indefinite hiatus in 2002. NSYNC performed at the Academy Awards in 2000, the 2002 Winter Olympics, and the Super Bowl XXXV halftime show. The band sold more than 70 million records worldwide, becoming the fifth-best-selling boy band in history.

The rise of Timberlake's own stardom and the general decline in the popularity of boy bands led to the dissolution of NSYNC. Band member Lance Bass was openly critical of Timberlake's actions in his memoir Out of Sync. By 2002, when the group went on an indefinite hiatus and members were pursuing individual projects, Timberlake partnered with Pharrell Williams of the producing team The Neptunes, and with Timbaland, to start working on new music. The idea of going solo was strengthened a year earlier. Timberlake originally wrote the single "Gone" around 2001 for Michael Jackson, but Jackson turned the song down, and it was instead recorded by NSYNC. Before its release, however, Jackson contacted him. Timberlake declared in a later interview that the first time he felt confident to go solo happened after that conversation. In a retrospective article in 2020, Billboard considered Celebrity "the group's swan song, setting the stage for Timberlake's equally massive solo career".

[Michael] called me on the phone and said that he wanted to cut the record ("Gone"), but he wanted it to be a duet between himself and I. And I said, 'Well ... we've already cut the song as an 'N Sync record. Could we do, like, 'N Sync featuring Michael Jackson', or 'Michael Jackson featuring 'N Sync'? And he was very absolute about the fact that he wanted it to be a duet between himself and I.. [That was] the first time I ever really felt the confidence to do it

— Timberlake on Master Class, 2014

=== 2002–2004: Justified and Super Bowl XXXVIII controversy ===
In August 2002, Timberlake performed at the 2002 MTV Video Music Awards, where he premiered his debut solo single, "Like I Love You", which peaked at number 11 on the Billboard Hot 100 and number two on the UK Singles Chart. His debut solo album, Justified, was released in November and debuted at number two on the Billboard 200 with first-week sales of 439,000 copies, fewer than previous 'N Sync releases. It sold over three million copies in the U.S. and more than ten million copies worldwide. Its R&B influence, provided by hip-hop producers The Neptunes and Timbaland, was complimented by music critics. About the musical direction of the record, he commented, "I just want to do R&B. It's what I grew up listening to". The album spawned the top-five singles "Cry Me a River" and "Rock Your Body".

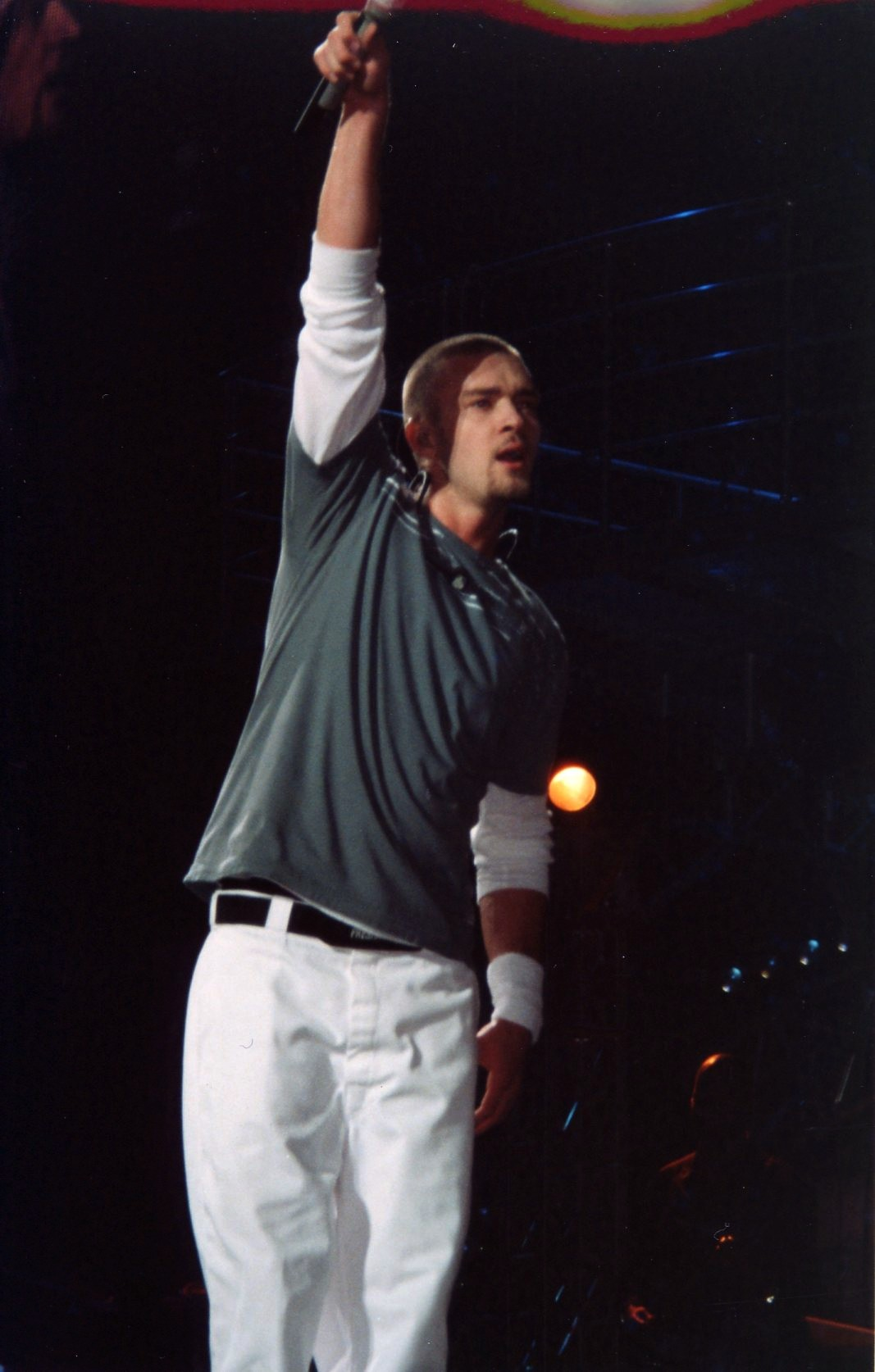
Timberlake in London on his Justified World Tour, December 2003

Near the end of 2002, Timberlake was the first celebrity to appear on Punk'd, a "candid camera" type show created by Ashton Kutcher to trick celebrities. Timberlake, who cried during the episode, later admitted to being under the influence of cannabis when he was pranked. Three episodes later, he set up Kelly Osbourne to be "punk'd", thus making him the first celebrity to appear on the show more than once. Timberlake later spoofed Ashton Kutcher and Punk'd in a 2003 episode of NBC's Saturday Night Live. Timberlake co-starred in a skit titled The Barry Gibb Talk Show alongside comedian Jimmy Fallon, where the duo portrayed Bee Gees brothers Barry and Robin Gibb. It marked the beginning of a long-running friendship and collaboration with Fallon.

In summer 2003, Timberlake and Christina Aguilera co-headlined The Justified & Stripped Tour. Later that year, he released the single "I'm Lovin' It", used by McDonald's as the theme to its "I'm Lovin' It" campaign. The deal with McDonald's earned Timberlake an estimated $6 million. A tour titled Justified and Lovin' It Live was included with the deal, following his initial Justified World Tour. Timberlake was featured on Nelly's song, "Work It", which was remixed and included on Nelly's 2003 remix album.

In February 2004, during the Super Bowl XXXVIII halftime show, broadcast on the CBS television network from Houston, Timberlake performed with Janet Jackson before a television audience of more than 140 million viewers. At the end of the performance, as the song drew to a close, Timberlake tore off a part of Jackson's black leather costume in a "costume reveal" meant to accompany a portion of the song lyrics. Jackson's representative explained Timberlake intended "to pull away the rubber bustier to reveal a red lace bra. Part of the costume detached, and Jackson's breast was briefly exposed. Timberlake apologized for the incident, stating he was "sorry that anyone was offended by the wardrobe malfunction during the halftime performance of the Super Bowl..." The phrase "wardrobe malfunction" has since been used by the media to refer to the incident and has entered pop culture. Timberlake and Jackson were threatened with exclusion from the 2004 Grammy Awards unless they agreed to apologize on screen at the event. Timberlake attended and issued a scripted apology when accepting the first of two Grammy Awards he received that night (Best Pop Vocal Album for Justified and Best Male Pop Vocal Performance for "Cry Me a River"). He had also been nominated for Album of the Year for Justified and Record of the Year along with Best Rap/Sung Collaboration for "Where Is the Love?" with The Black Eyed Peas.

=== 2004–2007: Films and FutureSex/LoveSounds ===
After the Super Bowl incident, Timberlake was "burned out" from his music career, opting out of an NSYNC reunion and elevating his acting career, having starred in a few feature films earlier in his career. The first role he took during this time was as a journalist in Edison Force, filmed in 2004 and released direct-to-video on July 18, 2006. He also appeared in the films Alpha Dog (2006) with Bruce Willis, Black Snake Moan (2006) with Samuel L. Jackson, Richard Kelly's Southland Tales (2006), and voiced Prince Artie Pendragon in the animated film Shrek the Third (2007).

During his hiatus from music, he continued to record with other artists. In 2004, he recorded "Good Foot" with Timbaland for the soundtrack of Shark Tale. After "Where Is the Love?", he again collaborated with the Black Eyed Peas on the 2005 track "My Style" from their album Monkey Business. That year, he collaborated with Charlie Wilson and Black Eyed Peas member Will.i.am on the song "Floatin'" on the former's album Charlie, Last Name Wilson, and collaborated on a track with Brazilian music artist Sérgio Mendes the following year. When recording the 2005 single "Signs" with Snoop Dogg, Timberlake discovered a throat condition. Nodules were subsequently removed from his throat in an operation that took place on May 5, 2005. He was advised not to sing or speak loudly for at least a few months. In 2005, he began his own record company, JayTee Records.

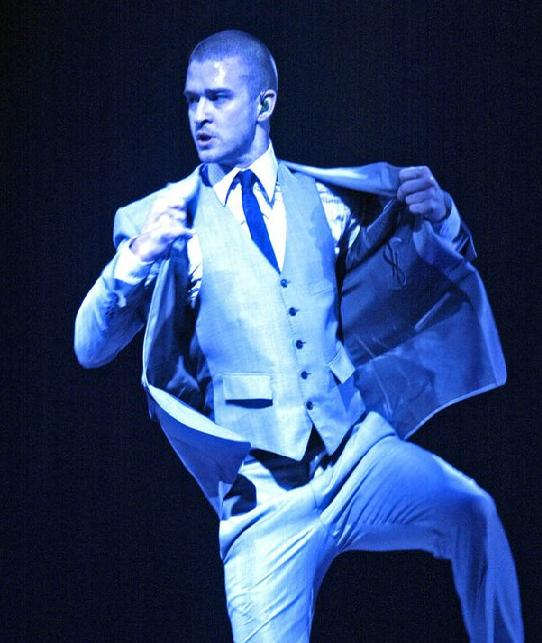
Timberlake performing at a concert in St. Paul, Minnesota, in January 2007 during the FutureSex/LoveShow

FutureSex/LoveSounds, a full-length LP of coherence and uniform song-to-song quality virtually unheard of in pop music since the '80s golden age of Michael, Madonna, Janet and Prince... Like one of his suit-and-vest combos, Timberlake himself continued to wear pop stardom exceptionally well. He glided through his music videos and live performances with the confidence of a man who'd already spent a large percentage of his life in the spotlight, and who never doubted he'd be able to return to music on top.

— Billboard's "The Greatest Pop Star By Year (1981–2019)"

In December 2005, Timberlake began production on his second album, FutureSex/LoveSounds, with returning producer Timbaland. Wanting an experimental direction, his goal for the album was "to capture moments' with a vivid, raw, off-the-cuff sound", while managing the recording sessions. At the time, Timberlake developed an interest in a rock direction, drawing inspiration from David Bowie and Prince, and even took influence from trance music into the album. In July 2006, the album's lead single, "SexyBack", was released, and in a few weeks, it reached number one on the Billboard Hot 100, where it remained for seven consecutive weeks, and was certified Diamond in his home country.

Timberlake released his second album, FutureSex/LoveSounds, on September 12, 2006. The album debuted at number one on the Billboard 200 album chart, selling 684,000 copies its first week. It became the biggest album for pre-orders on iTunes and beat Coldplay's record for the biggest one-week sales of a digital album. The album was produced by Timbaland and Danja (who produced a bulk of the album), will.i.am, Rick Rubin, and Timberlake himself, and features guest vocals by Snoop Dogg, Three 6 Mafia, T.I., and will.i.am. A studio representative described it as being "all about sexiness" and aiming for "an adult feel". "My Love", the album's second single, also produced by Timbaland and featuring rapper T.I., reached number one on the Hot 100, as did its third single, "What Goes Around... Comes Around". The song is reported to have been inspired by the breakup of his childhood friend and business partner, Trace Ayala, with actress Elisha Cuthbert.

Timberlake hosted many music events, including the 2006 European MTV Music Awards and 2007 Kids' Choice Awards. On December 16, 2006, Timberlake hosted Saturday Night Live, doing double duty as both host and musical guest for the second time. During this appearance, he and Andy Samberg performed an R&B song for a skit titled "Dick in a Box", which became a viral hit and one of the most viewed videos on YouTube at the time. Rolling Stone listed the skit at number three on their "50 Greatest 'Saturday Night Live' Sketches of All-Time". The song earned him an Emmy Award and was later featured on The Lonely Island's debut album, Incredibad.

In January 2007, Timberlake embarked on the FutureSex/LoveShow tour. Following singles off the album, "LoveStoned/I Think She Knows (Interlude)" and "Until the End of Time" peaked within the top 20 on the Hot 100, while the fourth single, "Summer Love", reached the top 10. The song "Give It to Me", a Timbaland single on which Timberlake guests with Nelly Furtado, reached the Hot 100 number-one spot. Eventually, FutureSex/LoveSounds was added to the Rock and Roll Hall of Fame's musical library and archive.

=== 2008–2012: Musical hiatus and focus on acting ===
The song "4 Minutes" was first played by Timbaland at Philadelphia's Jingle Ball on December 17, 2007. When released on March 17, 2008, "4 Minutes" was revealed to be a duet between Timberlake and Madonna, with backing vocals by Timbaland. It was the lead single from Madonna's eleventh album, Hard Candy, which featured four other songwriting collaborations with Timberlake, who was also one of the executive producers. The single was an international hit, topping the charts in over 21 countries worldwide.

In June 2007, Timberlake co-wrote, produced, and provided vocals for the songs "Nite Runner" and "Falling Down" for Duran Duran's album Red Carpet Massacre, released on November 13, 2007. "Falling Down" was released as a single in the UK on the previous day. Also in 2007, Timberlake made an appearance on 50 Cent's third album, Curtis. Timberlake, along with Timbaland, is featured on a track called "Ayo Technology", which was the album's fourth single. With the wrapping up of the FutureSex/LoveSounds tour of Australasia and the Middle East in November 2007, Timberlake resumed his film career. Projects underway early in 2008 were starring roles in Mike Myers' comedy The Love Guru (released June 20, 2008) and Mike Meredith's drama The Open Road (released August 28, 2009). On November 20, 2008, TV Guide reported that Timberlake's next single, "Follow My Lead", which also featured vocals by Timberlake's protégée, former YouTube star Esmée Denters, would be available for exclusive download through Myspace. All proceeds went to Shriners Hospitals for Children, a charity dedicated to improving pediatric care. At the 50th Grammy Awards in February 2008, Timberlake won two awards: Best Male Pop Vocal Performance for "What Goes Around...Comes Around" and Best Dance Recording for "LoveStoned/I Think She Knows".

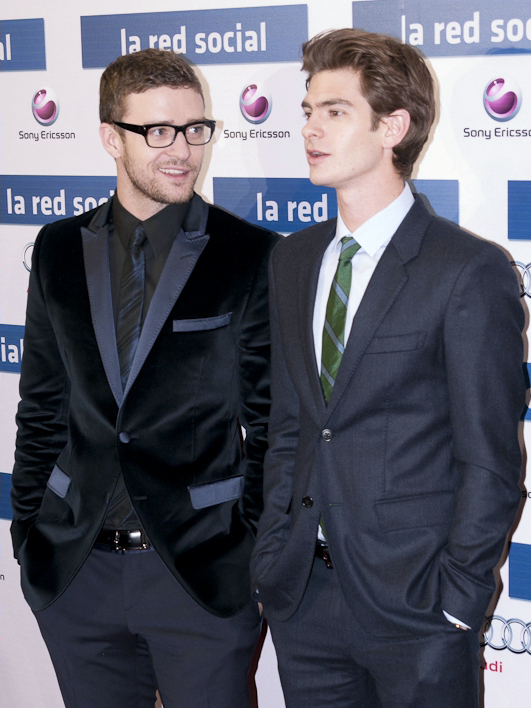
Timberlake (left) with Andrew Garfield (right) at an event for The Social Network in Madrid, October 2010

In 2008, a collaboration between Timberlake and T.I., "Dead and Gone", was featured on T.I.'s sixth album, Paper Trail, and was released as its fourth single late in 2009. In November 2008, it was confirmed that Timberlake would make a guest appearance and produce some tracks on R&B/pop singer Ciara's upcoming album Fantasy Ride, due out May 5, 2009. Timberlake featured on Ciara's second single, "Love Sex Magic", the video being shot on February 20, 2009. The single became a worldwide hit, reaching the top ten in numerous countries and peaking at number one in several countries, including Taiwan, India, and Turkey. The song was nominated for Best Pop Collaboration with Vocals at the 52nd Grammy Awards. Timberlake hosted the 16th ESPY Awards, and the musical number "I Love Sports" was later nominated for an Emmy Award. Timberlake and his production team, The Y's, along with Mike Elizondo, produced and co-wrote the song "Don't Let Me Down" for Leona Lewis's second album, Echo, released on November 17, 2009. Timberlake also co-wrote and performed on "Carry Out", the third single from Timbaland's album Shock Value II, released on December 1, 2009. Timberlake appeared on Jimmy Fallon's debut as host of Late Night with Jimmy Fallon on March 2, 2009. Timberlake was the executive producer on the MTV reality series The Phone, which premiered on April 21, 2009. In late 2009, Barbadian singer Rihanna released the album Rated R, with Timberlake being one of the writers and producers. They both worked together previously for her third album, Good Girl Gone Bad.

From 2010, Timberlake increased his acting work. He played Sean Parker, the founder of Napster, in the acclaimed film The Social Network (2010), and voiced Boo-Boo Bear in the live-action/animated comedy film Yogi Bear, adapted from the Hanna-Barbara series. He also appeared at the 2010 MTV VMAs on September 12, 2010. In 2011, he starred alongside Cameron Diaz in Bad Teacher and alongside Mila Kunis in Friends with Benefits and played Will Salas, the protagonist of In Time, a science fiction film by Andrew Niccol. He provided a feature and appeared in the music video for the song "Motherlover" from The Lonely Island's second album, Turtleneck & Chain, and directed and made a cameo in the FreeSol music video "Hoodies On, Hats Low", which was released in August 2011. The Late Night with Jimmy Fallon sketch "History of Rap" was performed for the first time by both Fallon and Timberlake in 2010. In July 2011, United States Marine Kelsey De Santis uploaded a YouTube video asking Timberlake to be her date to the United States Marine Corps birthday ball; they attended the event on November 13, 2011, in Richmond, Virginia. His fifth Saturday Night Live episode, as host and musical guest, was the most-watched episode in 14 months, with Charles Barkley as host and Kelly Clarkson as musical guest.

=== 2013–2017: The 20/20 Experience, 2 of 2, and Trolls ===
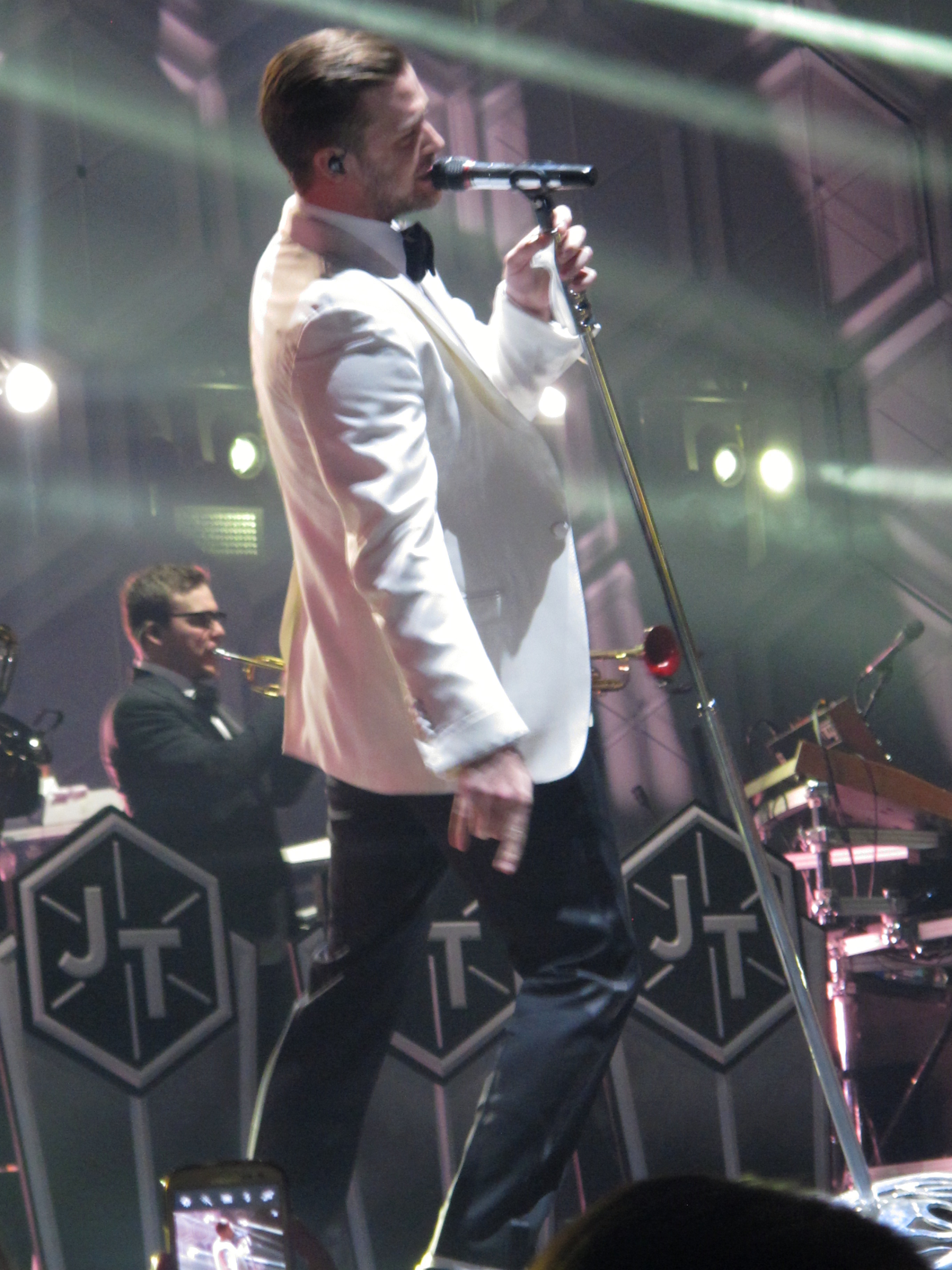
Timberlake performing during The 20/20 Experience World Tour, February 2014. It is Timberlake's highest-grossing tour.

Timberlake began working on his third album, The 20/20 Experience, in June 2012 with "no rules and/or end goal in mind". He publicly announced his return to the music industry in January 2013, releasing the album's lead single, "Suit & Tie" featuring Jay-Z later that month, which would eventually peak at number three on the Billboard Hot 100. After four years of not performing in concert, Timberlake appeared the night before the 2013 Super Bowl and performed during the "DirecTV Super Saturday Night" on February 2, 2013, in New Orleans. On February 10, 2013, he performed "Suit & Tie" with sepia-toned lighting at the 55th Annual Grammy Awards, with Jay-Z joining him from the audience. On February 11, 2013, "Mirrors" was released as the second single from The 20/20 Experience. The song would eventually peak at number two on the Billboard Hot 100 and number one on the UK Singles Chart. The 20/20 Experience was released on March 19, 2013, through RCA Records due to the disbandment of Jive Records. The album set a digital sales record for being the fastest-selling album on the iTunes Store and debuted at number one on the charts by moving just over 968,000 copies in the U.S., the biggest sales week of 2013. It eventually became the best-selling album of the year in the country.

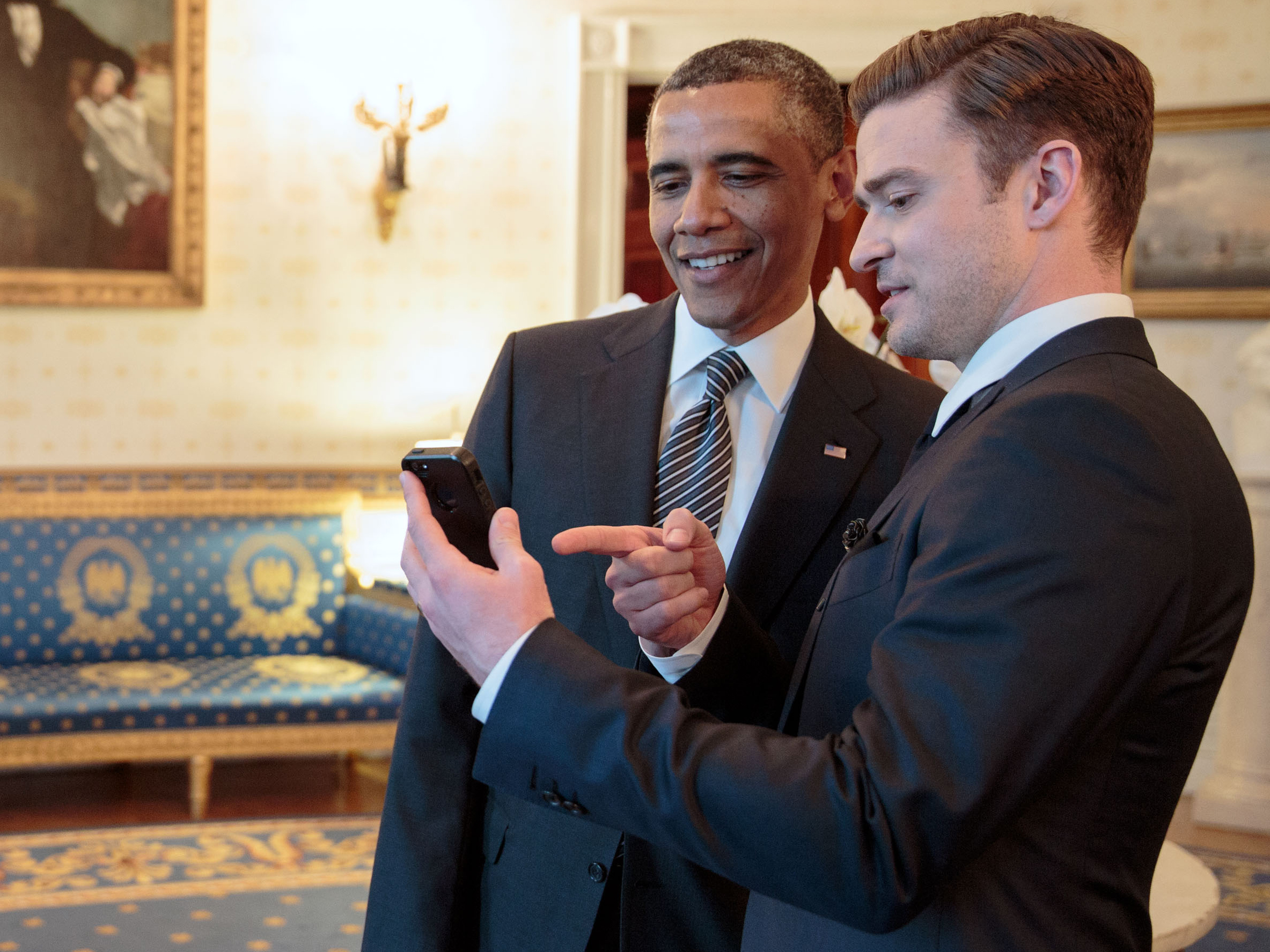
Timberlake and President Obama, 2013

Timberlake performed at the "In Performance at the White House: Memphis Soul" concert, held in the East Room of the White House and hosted by President Barack Obama, celebrating Memphis soul music from the 1960s. Afterward, Timberlake officially announced The 20/20 Experience World Tour, following his and Jay-Z's co-headlining concert tour, Legends of the Summer Stadium Tour. Timberlake also appeared on Jay-Z's twelfth album, Magna Carta... Holy Grail on three songs: "Holy Grail", "BBC" (along with Nas, Swizz Beatz, Timbaland, Pharrell Williams, Niigo & Beyoncé), and "Heaven". On August 25, 2013, Timberlake received the Michael Jackson Video Vanguard Award at the 2013 MTV Video Music Awards. He also took home three competitive awards, including Video of the Year for "Mirrors". During his performance, Timberlake briefly reunited with his fellow former NSYNC bandmates for a medley of their hit songs "Girlfriend" and "Bye Bye Bye".

Timberlake's fourth album, The 20/20 Experience – 2 of 2, was released on September 30, 2013, and debuted at number one on the Billboard 200. Its lead single, "Take Back the Night", was released on July 12, 2013, followed by the second single, "TKO". Timberlake was given a production and writing credit on track six on Beyoncé's self-titled fifth album, which was released in December 2013. At the 57th Annual Grammy Awards, Timberlake was nominated for seven awards, eventually winning three: Best R&B Song for "Pusher Love Girl", Best Rap/Sung Collaboration for "Holy Grail", and Best Music Video for "Suit & Tie", which was directed by The Social Network director David Fincher. On February 25, 2014, "Not a Bad Thing" was released as the third single from The 20/20 Experience – 2 of 2. The song reached the top 10 on the Hot 100 and topped the Mainstream Top 40 chart. In 2014, Timberlake appeared on Michael Jackson's second posthumous record, Xscape, on the song "Love Never Felt So Good", which was produced by Timbaland, Jerome "J-Roc" Harmon, and Timberlake. On May 14, 2014, a music video was also released featuring clips of Jackson, with Timberlake accompanied by several of Jackson's fans performing some of Jackson's signature moves. The video was directed by Timberlake and Rich Lee. During 2015, Timberlake performed along with Jimmy Fallon in the Saturday Night Live 40th Anniversary's cold open and returned to The Tonight Show Starring Jimmy Fallon as a guest to perform a sixth edition of the sketch "History of Rap". He also performed along with Chris Stapleton at the 49th Annual Country Music Association Awards.

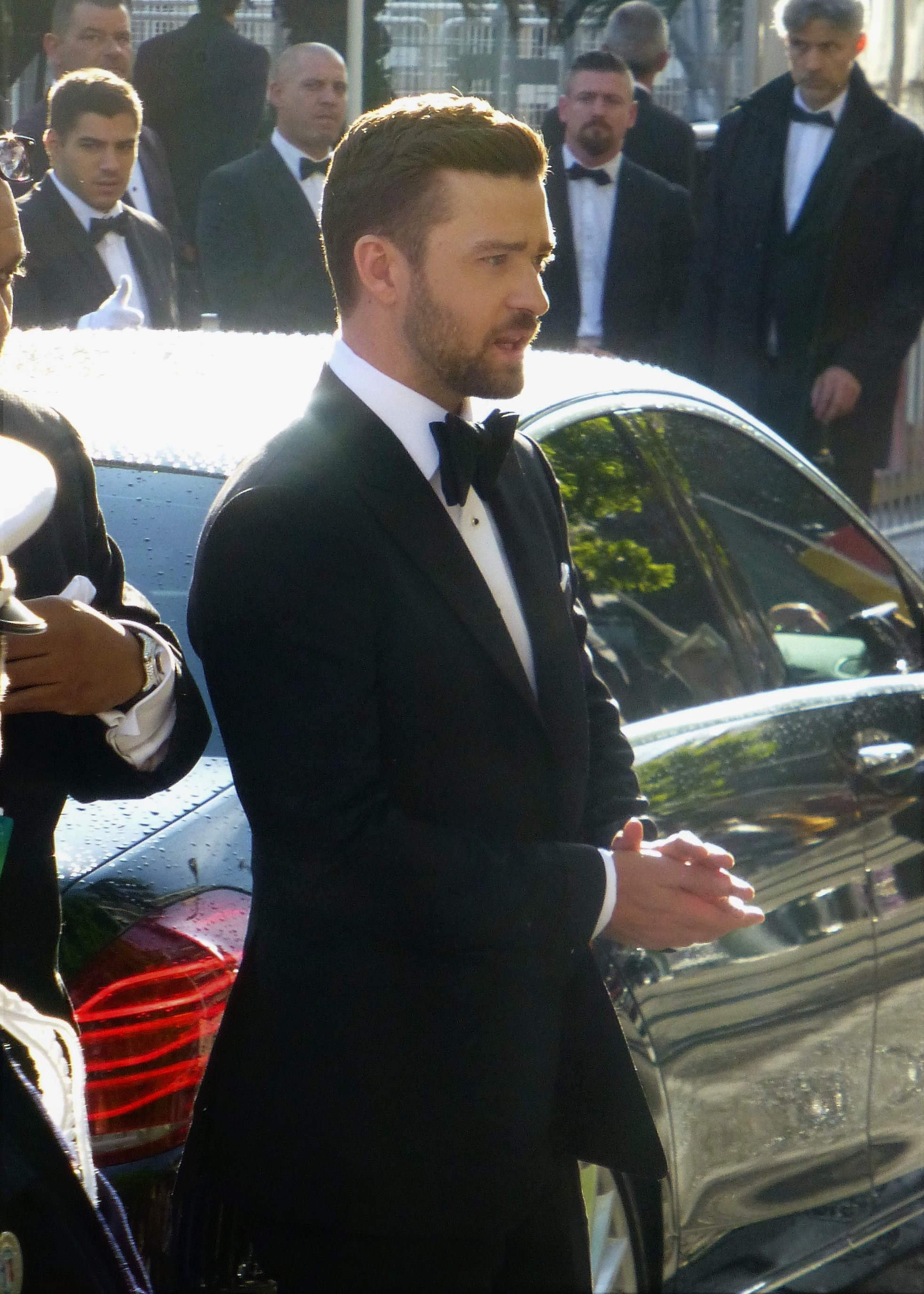
Timberlake at the 2016 Cannes Film Festival

Showcasing the final date of The 20/20 Experience World Tour at Las Vegas' MGM Grand Garden Arena, the space-age-themed concert film titled Justin Timberlake + The Tennessee Kids and directed by Jonathan Demme premiered at the 2016 Toronto International Film Festival on September 13. Timberlake dedicated the film to Prince for influencing his music. Ahead of its debut at the film festival, the streaming service Netflix released it on October 12. Timberlake composed the soundtrack and served as music supervisor for the 2017 film The Book of Love, which his wife, Jessica Biel, produced and starred in.

Timberlake voiced the lead character in DreamWorks Animation's musical comedy Trolls opposite Anna Kendrick. The film was released in November 2016 and returned for its next two entries, Trolls: World Tour and Trolls: Band Together, in 2020 and 2023, respectively. He also served as the executive music producer, performing original music for the film. The lead single, "Can't Stop the Feeling!", was released on May 6, 2016. Timberlake was invited by Swedish broadcaster Sveriges Television (SVT) to perform "Can't Stop the Feeling" live during the interval act at the grand finale of the Eurovision Song Contest 2016 on May 14, 2016. The single debuted at number one on the U.S. Billboard Hot 100 and reached the top spot in 16 other countries, becoming his eighth U.S. Mainstream Top 40 number-one song. It also became the best-selling song of the year in the U.S. with 2.4 million downloads sold. On February 26, 2017, Timberlake opened the 89th Academy Awards with a performance of "Can't Stop the Feeling!" since the song earned him a nomination. Also that year, Timberlake starred with Kate Winslet and Juno Temple in Woody Allen's drama film Wonder Wheel. He headlined several festivals and live sets, including Rock in Rio, the United States Grand Prix, and the Pilgrimage Music & Cultural Festival, which he co-produced.

=== 2018–2022: Man of the Woods and Super Bowl LII halftime show ===
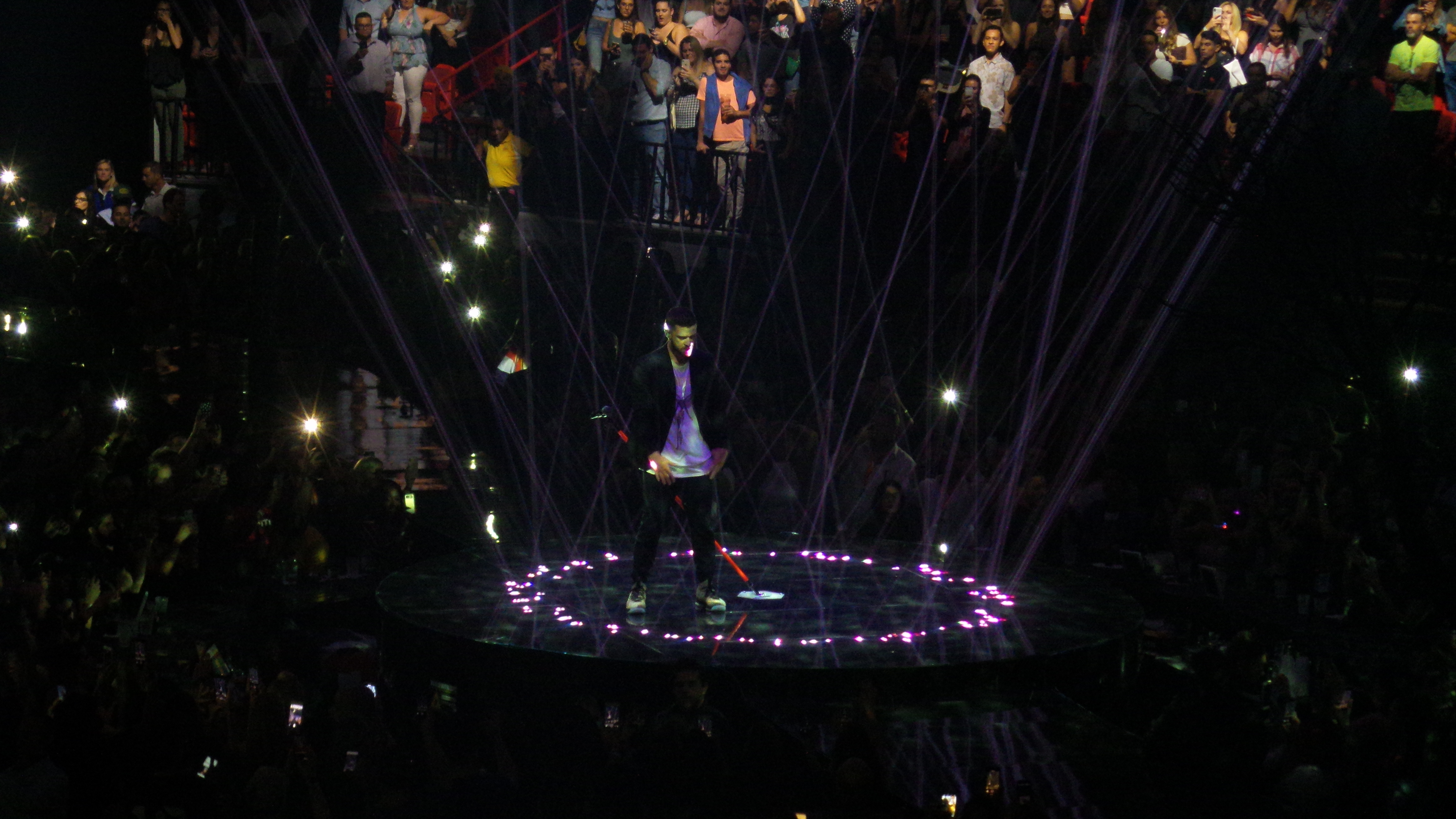
Timberlake performing on The Man of the Woods Tour in Miami on May 18, 2018, which was the sixth highest-grossing tour of 2018

For the biggest pop stars in the world, the place where they have the most trouble is honesty... Because there's a formulaic sort of vulnerability... But if you're able to really screenshot your own vulnerability, frame it properly, and color-correct it, then it becomes something that every human can relate to. And I think Justin is in the place where he's mastering that right now.

— Pharrell Williams on the recording sessions for Man of the Woods, Timberlake's fifth album

Speaking of his fifth album in 2016, Timberlake stated, "I think where I grew up in America has a lot of influence. Growing up in Tennessee—very central in the country—Memphis is known as the birthplace of rock & roll, but also the home of the blues, but Nashville's right down the street so there's a lot of country music." He later mentioned "It sounds more like where I've come from than any other music I've ever made... It's Southern American music. But I want to make it sound modern – at least that's the idea right now."

His fifth album, Man of the Woods, was released on February 2, 2018, two days before he headlined the Super Bowl LII halftime show in Minneapolis, Minnesota, on February 4. Timberlake performed a medley of his songs featuring both the Tennessee Kids and the Minnesota Marching Band alongside him, as well as a duet of "I Would Die 4 U" with a video projection of late singer Prince on screen. The show contained multiple selections from Man of the Woods, which is named after his son Silas, whose name means "from the forest". The album's first single, "Filthy", was released on January 5, along with its accompanying video directed by Mark Romanek. The electro-funk, electropop, and R&B song reached number nine in the U.S and number five in Canada. The songs "Supplies", "Say Something" featuring Chris Stapleton, and "Man of the Woods" were also released along with music videos ahead of the album. His collaboration with Stapleton also reached the top 10 in the U.S. and Canada.

Man of the Woods topped the Billboard 200 with the biggest first-week sales of the year at the time, selling 293,000 total units. Man of the Woods also marks Timberlake's fourth consecutive No. 1 album and has since been certified Platinum by the Recording Industry Association of America (RIAA). Man of the Woods concluded 2018 as the sixth best-selling album of the year. An accompanying tour of the same name began on March 13, 2018, in Toronto, Canada and concluded on April 13, 2019, in Uncasville. The Man of the Woods Tour was the sixth-highest-grossing tour of 2018.

In May 2019, Timberlake received an honorary doctorate from Berklee College of Music. Missy Elliott and Alex Lacamoire also received doctorates at the ceremony.

Following the announcement of Trolls World Tour, Timberlake teased potential collaborations with a number of artists through a series of Instagram posts. This included frequent collaborators Pharrell Williams, Nathaniel Hills, and Rob Knox, as well as new collaborators such as Anderson .Paak, Brandy Norwood, Lizzo, and Meek Mill. On February 26, 2020, SZA and Timberlake released the single "The Other Side", a song part of the Trolls World Tour soundtrack, alongside its music video. On March 9, 2020, Timberlake released a teaser for his upcoming song "Don't Slack", which features Anderson .Paak, and is also part of the Trolls World Tour soundtrack. The song was released on March 10, 2020.

In September 2020, Timberlake and producer Timbaland teased a potential upcoming collaboration with Canadian musician Justin Bieber, as well as collaborations with Justine Skye, Hit-Boy, and Ty Dolla Sign. In December 2020, Timberlake and Ant Clemons released the single "Better Days", which premiered on the Rock the Runoff virtual concert, held by Stacey Abrams' organization Fair Fight.

In January 2021, Timberlake performed as part of the inauguration of Joe Biden. Performing from his hometown of Memphis, Timberlake performed his collaboration with Ant Clemons during the Celebrating America special. Timberlake performed at Pharrell Williams' Something in the Water festival in Washington, D.C., where he was joined on stage by T.I. and Clipse for his five-song set.

=== 2023–present: Everything I Thought It Was ===
In May 2023, Timbaland revealed that Timberlake's sixth album was completed, adding that the pair had revived the sound from the FutureSex/LoveSounds era. On September 1, 2023, Timbaland released the single "Keep Going Up", in collaboration with Furtado and Timberlake. Timberlake also reunited with his fellow former band members of NSYNC later that month and released the single "Better Place" to support the Trolls Band Together soundtrack. In addition to "Keep Going Up" and "Better Place", Timberlake had also collaborated with Meek Mill on the song "Believe", Romeo Santos on the song "Sin Fin", DJ Khaled on his album Khaled Khaled on the song "Just Be", Justine Skye on her album Space & Time on the song "Innocent", Jack Harlow on his album Come Home the Kids Miss You on the song "Parent Trap"; a remix of Coco Jones' "ICU" and a further remix of the song "3D" by Jungkook. Timberlake had also worked with Calvin Harris, producer of "Fuckin' Up the Disco" and "No Angels", on his song "Stay with Me", alongside Pharrell Williams and Halsey.

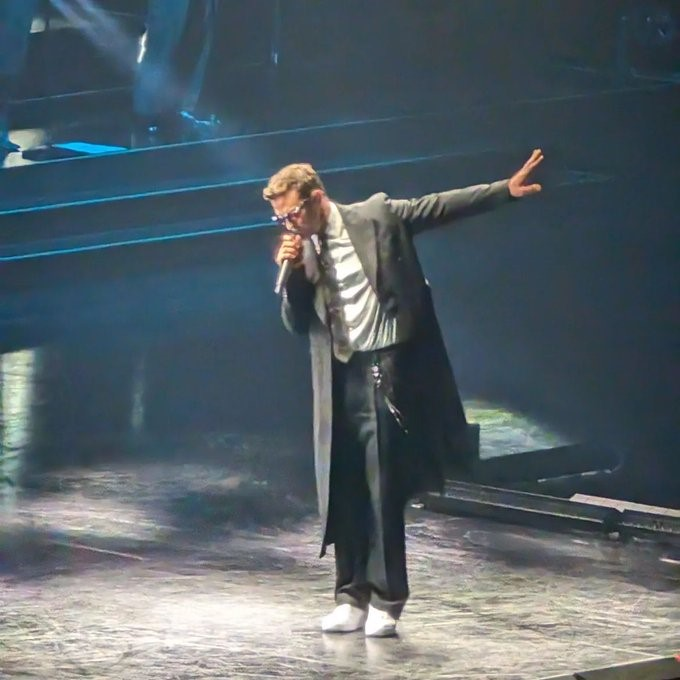
Timberlake performing on The Forget Tomorrow World Tour in Seattle on May 2, 2024

On January 19, 2024, Timberlake performed a free one-night-only concert at the Orpheum in Memphis, where he live-debuted his new single "Selfish" after teasing a new project on social media in previous days. In promotion of the record, on January 25, 2024, Timberlake appeared on The Tonight Show Starring Jimmy Fallon; he announced the release of "Selfish" and revealed that the album had taken four years to produce.

"Selfish" debuted at number 19 on the Billboard Hot 100, marking Timberlake's highest debut in six years on the chart. It became his 39th career solo entry on the Hot 100 and his 29th to reach the top 40. On the release day of "Selfish", he also announced that his sixth album, Everything I Thought It Was, would be released in March 2024. Timberlake appeared as a musical guest on the January 27, 2024, episode of Saturday Night Live, singing "Selfish" and "Sanctified". On January 30, he appeared on The Kelly Clarkson Show and held an "intimate" concert at Irving Plaza in New York City on January 31, his 43rd birthday. He appeared as the musical guest to perform "Selfish" on The Graham Norton Show, recorded in London on February 22, 2024. The following night, he cancelled a one-night-only concert at London's Roundhouse. The promotional single "Drown" was released on February 23, 2024. Timberlake also appeared on Complex Networks Sneaker Shopping on March 11, 2024, and mentioned the release of his new album at the end of the video.

On March 13, 2024, in anticipation of the album release, Timberlake performed a one-off concert at The Wiltern in Los Angeles. The show featured a surprise reunion with his NSYNC bandmates, with the group playing a medley of hits and the new album track "Paradise". Timberlake then performed on NPR's Tiny Desk series on March 15 for a half-hour-long concert. Timberlake also announced the release of a documentary showing the album's creation process. The second single off the record, "No Angels", was released on March 15, 2024, the same day as the album's release. Everything I Thought It Was debuted at number four on the U.S. Billboard 200, giving Timberlake his sixth consecutive top five album in the country.

In April 2024, Timberlake opened the iHeartRadio Music Awards, performing both singles off the album, "Selfish" and "No Angels". Timberlake also promoted the album on the Forget Tomorrow World Tour, which began on April 29, 2024, in Vancouver, Canada. On February 23, 2024, Timberlake announced summer 2024 Europe tour dates. In March 2024, prior to the tour launching, Trace William Cowen of Complex reported that the Forget Tomorrow World Tour had become Timberlake's fastest-selling tour to date, stating that the tour had amassed over $140 million globally in initial ticket sales from over 70 dates and that more than one million attendees are expected. Cowen concluded that "Justin Timberlake's Forget Tomorrow World Tour Is Set to Become His Biggest Yet." On May 20, 2024, Pollstar announced that nine additional shows were added due to "overwhelming demand" and reported that over 1 million tickets were already sold, becoming Timberlake's fastest selling tour to date. The tour received generally positive reviews.

In January 2026, Timberlake performed at the Recording Academy Honours Presented by the Black Music Collective in tribute to Pharrell Williams, who received the Dr. Dre Global Impact Award; Timberlake performed his Williams-produced singles "Señorita", "Rock Your Body" and "Like I Love You".

== Personal life ==
=== Relationships and children ===
In early 1999, Timberlake began dating fellow former The All-New Mickey Mouse Club cast member and singer Britney Spears. Their relationship ended abruptly in March 2002. Spears wrote in her 2023 memoir, The Woman in Me, that she became pregnant during their relationship and had an abortion in late 2000 after Timberlake said they were not prepared for parenthood and he did not want to be a father. In 2003, he briefly dated British singer Emma Bunton. In April 2003, he began a relationship with actress Cameron Diaz soon after they met at the Nickelodeon Kids' Choice Awards. After much speculation about their relationship, the couple split in December 2006 shortly after she introduced him as a musical guest on Saturday Night Live.

In January 2007, Timberlake began dating actress Jessica Biel. They became engaged in December 2011 and married on October 19, 2012, at the Borgo Egnazia resort in Fasano, Italy. Their first child, a son, was born in April 2015. In July 2020, they had a second son.

=== Legal issues ===
Shortly after midnight on June 18, 2024, Timberlake was arrested in Sag Harbor, New York, for driving while intoxicated (DWI). In addition to being charged with one count of DWI, Timberlake was issued two citations, one for running a stop sign and one for failure to keep in lane. He was released nine hours later following his first arraignment at Sag Harbor Village Justice Court. The Sag Harbor Police Department later released his mugshot. Timberlake was scheduled to return to court on July 26, 2024. According to his arrest report, Timberlake alleged to authorities that he only had one martini shortly before he was pulled over. Despite making this claim, Timberlake refused a breathalyzer.

On June 22, 2024, bartender employees at the hotel where Timberlake was staying before his DWI arrest confirmed to People that he only had one martini while at the hotel bar. One employee stated, "If he was drinking more, it wasn't here." However, according to the arrest report, the officer who pulled Timberlake over after he drove through a stop sign and failed to keep on the right side of the road stated that his eyes were "bloodshot and glassy", had strong odor from alcohol, and performed poorly on standardized field sobriety tests. During the stop, Timberlake reportedly said, "This is going to ruin the tour." The officer, who did not know who Timberlake was, asked, "What tour?" to which Timberlake replied, "The world tour". That exchange went viral, spawning several memes; the reported exchange was not part of the body camera footage of the arrest released in March 2026.

At a concert in Chicago on June 21, 2024, Timberlake appeared to address the arrest, saying, "We've been through ups and downs and lefts and rights ... It's been a tough week, but you're here, and I'm here ... I know sometimes I'm hard to love, but you keep on loving me and I love you right back". Timberlake's lawyer Edward Burke attended his July 26 court arraignment while Timberlake was performing overseas in Poland. Despite Burke's arguments that Timberlake was not intoxicated at the time of his arrest, Carl Irace, Sag Harbor Village's Justice, ordered Timberlake to be re-arraigned on August 2. For the August 2 arraignment, Timberlake, who was still on tour, appeared virtually from Antwerp, Belgium, and pled not guilty to a revised misdemeanor charge of driving drunk. Irace also agreed to review Burke's motion to dismiss the DWI charge. However, Timberlake's New York license was suspended by the judge for an indeterminate amount of time.

Timberlake was scheduled to have another hearing on August 9, which he was not required to attend. On September 11, it was revealed that Timberlake would plead guilty to a less serious traffic offense during his September 13 court appearance, with the DWI charge being dropped. Under his plea deal, Timberlake agreed to plead guilty to driving while impaired, a lesser offense that carries a penalty of a $300 to $500 fine and a 90-day driver's license suspension. On September 13, during an in-person appearance at the Sag Harbor Village Justice Courthouse, Timberlake pled guilty to a non-criminal driving-while-impaired traffic violation. Irace then sentenced Timberlake to a $500 fine with a $260 surcharge, 25 hours of community service at the nonprofit of his choosing, and required him to make a public safety announcement. It was also revealed that Timberlake's refusal to take a breathalyzer automatically triggered a suspension of his driver's license under New York State law.

=== Residences ===
In July 2002, Timberlake purchased a 13,250-square-foot (1,231 m^{2}) mansion in Hollywood Hills for $8.3 million from Helen Hunt. In 2010, Timberlake purchased a unit at 311 West Broadway in SoHo, formerly owned by Oscar de la Renta, for $6.56 million. He sold the unit in 2018 for $6.35 million, incurring a loss. In May 2017, Timberlake and his wife, Jessica Biel, paid $20.2 million for a 5,375-square-foot (499.4 m^{2}) penthouse unit at 443 Greenwich Street in Tribeca, Manhattan.

=== Earnings ===
Forbes began reporting on Timberlake's earnings in 2008, calculating that he earned $44 million between June 2007 and June 2008 for his music, tour, commercials, and hospitality, making him the world's fourth-best-paid music personality at the time, above Madonna and Celine Dion. That year, he was ranked twelfth on the Forbes Celebrity 100 list and second on the "Best-Paid Celebrities Under 30" list.

According to Billboard, Timberlake was the third highest-paid musician of 2013, with earnings of $31 million. He was ranked 26th with earnings of $57 million on the Celebrity 100 list for 2014 and 19th on the 2015 list with $63 million. Timberlake was listed at number three on the Billboard Money-Makers List of 2014.

He was ranked 41st on the 2019 Celebrity 100 list by Forbes, with earnings of $57.5 million.

=== Health ===
At the end of his Forget Tomorrow World Tour in July 2025, Timberlake stated he had been diagnosed with Lyme disease. He shared in an Instagram post, "When I first got the diagnosis I was shocked for sure. But, at least I could understand why I would be onstage and in a massive amount of nerve pain or, just feeling crazy fatigue or sickness. I was faced with a personal decision. Stop touring? Or, keep going and figure it out. I decided the joy that performing brings me far outweighs the fleeting stress my body was feeling. I'm so glad I kept going."

== Artistry ==
Timberlake possesses a lyric tenor vocal range. He began including beatboxing in his records near the end of his boyband era and into his emergence as a solo act with Justified and FutureSex/LoveSounds. Many of his songs draw from his personal life and relationships, such as "Cry Me a River" (about his breakup with Britney Spears). Described by critics as a "consummate showman", Timberlake usually plays guitar, piano, and keyboard in his shows. Although his music is rooted in pop and R&B, Katie Rogers of The New York Times highlighted Timberlake's crossover appeal after his performance with Chris Stapleton at the 2015 Country Music Association Awards.

Timberlake's debut studio album, Justified (2002), is primarily an R&B album that includes influences from dance-pop, funk, and soul music. Timberlake has described it as influenced by Michael Jackson and Stevie Wonder. For the album's supporting tour, the Justified and Stripped Tour, he co-headlined with Christina Aguilera, drawing praise from Robert Hilburn of the Los Angeles Times for his comfort in performing as part of a package. His second studio album, FutureSex/LoveSounds (2006), departed from his earlier work to explore a broader sound, with elements of rap, rock, funk, soul, gospel, new wave, opera, and world music. During production, Timberlake was interested in musical techniques associated with rock music, which inspired his approach to recording. He described the album as drawing from David Bowie and Prince. Other influences include late INXS frontman Michael Hutchence, Arcade Fire, David Byrne, The Killers, The Strokes, and Radiohead.

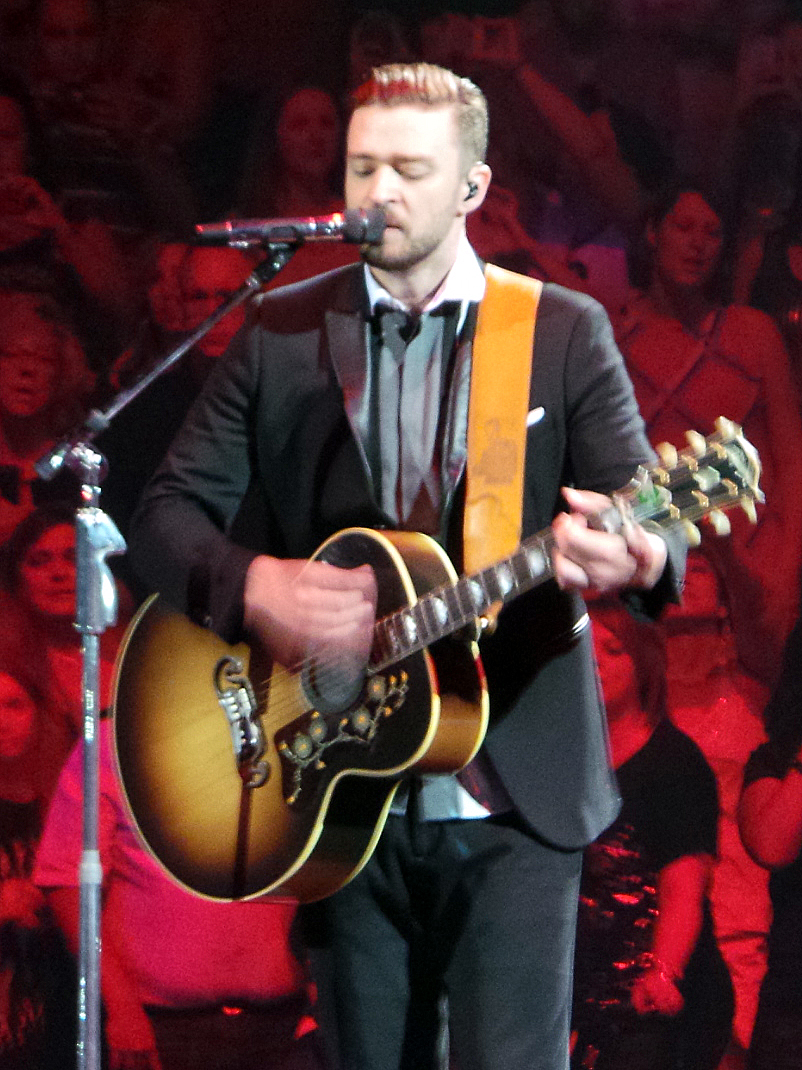
Timberlake performing on his 20/20 Experience Tour in Charlotte, North Carolina

Timberlake's third studio album, The 20/20 Experience (2013), is a neo-soul album partly inspired by the expansive song structures of 1960s and 1970s rock. Mikael Wood of the Los Angeles Times found its elaborate structures ambitious in the vein of Stevie Wonder, Prince, and Michael Jackson. He supported the album with a pair of tours: the Legends of the Summer Stadium Tour, which he co-headlined with Jay-Z, and The 20/20 Experience World Tour. These tours introduced his backing ensemble, the Tennessee Kids, a 15-piece multi-instrumentalist throwback to big band music. Timberlake's fourth studio album, The 20/20 Experience – 2 of 2 (2013), is an R&B, pop, and funk album.

Timberlake's fifth studio album, Man of the Woods (2018), incorporates traditional R&B as well as influences from country and funk described as "...Americana with 808s". In a second teaser trailer for the album, Timberlake said that it has a number of influences. "It's meant to be heard outside even more than inside, I believe. You talk about those, like, Southern guitars and that sound that feels like heritage. That is me exercising my love for where I came from." Rolling Stone described most of the album's first half as "cosmopolitan future-funk", while Variety stated the music is funk-soul. Before the album's release, Timberlake hosted a listening session with music industry insiders and members of the press. The Associated Press commented that the album features pop, R&B, and electronic tracks. His sixth studio album, Everything I Thought It Was (2024), is an R&B, hip-hop, pop, and nu-disco record.

== Public image ==
Timberlake's fashion and style evolution, from "boy-band synchronized wardrobe days" to "a notable source of fashion inspiration to men all over", has been noticed by the media. As noted by a Billboard editor, "Since his solo career began with the 2002 release of debut album Justified, Timberlake has honed his unique sense of style", while citing Elvis Presley, Johnny Cash, Jerry Lee Lewis, and Frank Sinatra as style influences: "guys who were just really never trying to be that [stylish], they just were that". According to American fashion designer Tom Ford, who has dressed Timberlake since 2011 and created more than 600 exclusive pieces for The 20/20 Experience World Tour, Timberlake "has a kind of effortless cool that makes classic menswear tailoring modern".

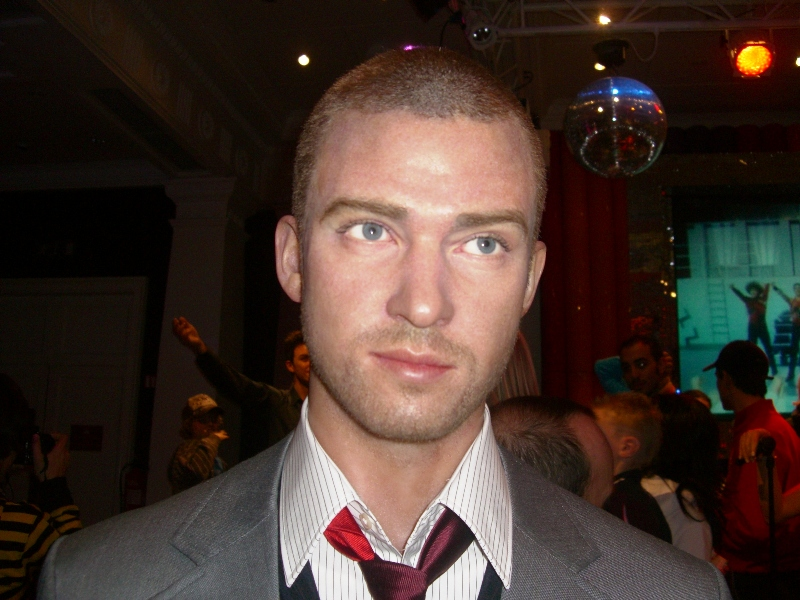
Wax statue of Timberlake at Madame Tussauds in London

Sia Michel of The New York Times wrote in 2007, "Since his last tour, for 2002's multiplatinum Justified, he has learned how to project sex-symbol edge", adding, "he's a rock star who can commit." Napster's founder, Sean Parker, portrayed by Timberlake in The Social Network, stated, "I don't think I look anything like Timberlake, but it's not so bad being played by a sex symbol." In Nielsen Music's U.S. report for 2015, Timberlake led the "Top 10 Musicians Among Millennials" list. Wax statues of him are on display at the Madame Tussauds wax museums in New York, Las Vegas, Hollywood, Nashville, Berlin, Amsterdam, and London. His costume used in the Saturday Night Live skit "Dick in a Box" is displayed at "Saturday Night Live: The Exhibition" in New York.

After New York legalized same-sex marriage in 2011, he voiced his support for LGBT equality in the U.S., stating, "We're people and we're different, all of us. And we should be using our differences to bring ourselves closer together." Timberlake and his wife, Jessica Biel, received the Inspiration Award at the GLSEN Respect Awards in 2015, with the executive director saying, "They are two vocal and committed allies to the LGBT community who are also devoted to charitable works that improve the lives of youth."

Timberlake's pronunciation of the word "me" on "It's Gonna Be Me" was popularized as an internet meme titled "It's Gonna Be May", after a Tumblr image of Timberlake was posted in 2012 with the respective caption. The meme eventually became an annually recurring joke throughout the month of April, which gained the attention of Barack Obama and Timberlake himself. Influenced by the national attention received by Timberlake's selfie inside a voting booth shared on Instagram during the 2016 presidential election, which was illegal at the time, Senator Brian Kelsey of Germantown, Tennessee brought up a bill that would allow taking photos in voting poll stations, with some exceptions against bad procedures. It was later approved by the Tennessee Senate.

In June 2021, Timberlake spoke out to support Britney Spears during her court battle over her conservatorship. Timberlake wrote on his Twitter that "No woman should ever be restricted from making decisions about her own body [...] [Jessica Biel] and I send our love, and our absolute support to Britney during this time. We hope the courts, and her family make this right and let her live however she wants to live".

=== Controversies ===
Following the release of Framing Britney Spears, public attention was brought to old comments Timberlake made in 2002 to describe his relationship with Britney Spears following their breakup, with some considering them to contain misogynistic rhetoric. It also led to renewed interest in his participation in the Super Bowl XXXVIII halftime show controversy, where he exposed Janet Jackson's breast on live television. Following much public pressure, Timberlake issued a public apology on his Instagram page, writing he "benefited from a system that condones misogyny and racism" and "I do not want to ever benefit from others being pulled down again." He finished by saying, "I care deeply about the wellbeing of the people I love and have loved. I can do better and I will do better".

Public scrutiny surrounding the Super Bowl XXXVIII incident was raised when a stylist alleged that the plan was originally for Timberlake to step on the back of Jackson's dress "to reveal her butt in this pearl g-string" but that he changed the plan to exposing her breast because he wanted a "reveal" to "one-up" Britney Spears' and Madonna's kiss at the 2003 MTV Video Music Awards. The claim that Timberlake wanted the breast reveal, however, is contradictory to a statement from Salli Frattini, the producer of the halftime show, who stated in 2018 that the production team experimented with removing elements of clothing in rehearsal to reveal Jackson's skirt without nudity but that the idea was ultimately nixed. According to Frattini, it was Jackson's team who pitched the idea to Timberlake prior to the show that led to Jackson's breast being exposed.

In March 2026, Timberlake filed a lawsuit against the Sag Harbor Village Police Department seeking to block the release of body camera footage from his 2024 DWI arrest, arguing it would cause irreparable harm to his reputation. Suffolk County Judge Joseph Farneti granted a temporary restraining order on March 5, 2026, pending further court proceedings.

== Legacy ==
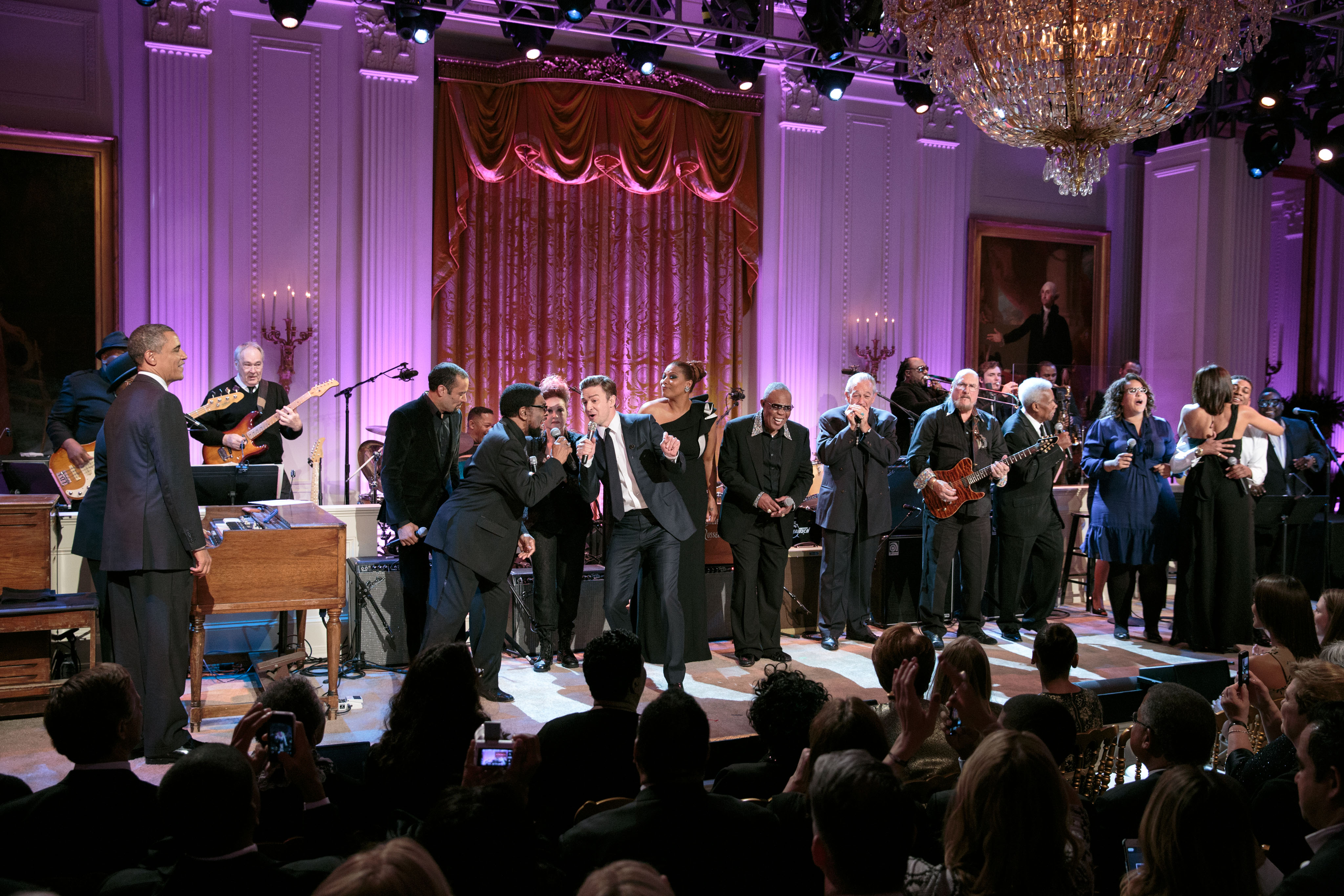
Timberlake (center) and Steve Cropper performing at the White House, 2013, with President Barack Obama on the left.

Timberlake has been referred to as the "President of Pop" and the "Prince of Pop" by contemporary journalists. In a 2016 article in The Hollywood Reporter, editor Scott Feinberg stated Timberlake is "widely regarded as one of the greatest all-around entertainers in the history of show business".

In 2003, Rolling Stone named him the biggest pop star of the year and featured him on the magazine's cover, declaring he was "The New King of Pop". For Entertainment Weekly, his second album, FutureSex/LoveSounds, "redefined pop's cutting edge"; for Vibe, it "pushed boundaries more forcefully" than works by his male contemporaries. Fuse TV's editor Jason Lipshutz stated it "changed the game. [The album] was steely and sweaty, a universal dance opus that made room for intimacy. It had the best first half of any pop album in 25 years. You have to go back to 1979 for Off the Wall to find a pop album with a first half that matches up." He was ranked 66th on the VH1 100 Greatest Artists of All Time. Timberlake appeared for the first time on the Time 100 list of most influential people by Time in 2007. In 2013, he made his second appearance on the 100 list, with Stevie Wonder writing, "Justin has accomplished a lot at a young age, taking advantage of all the possibilities, and yet he's found time to give of himself too—he gets and gives back. He has a spirit. He does God's work through using the most of his talent."

The Justified single "Cry Me a River" was ranked at number 20 on Rolling Stone's 100 Best Songs of the 2000s and one of their 500 greatest songs of all time. Billboard editor Jason Lipshutz named the song's music video "one of the more brilliant musical moments in pop music since the dawn of the century". His second album, FutureSex/LoveSounds, was placed at 46 on the Rolling Stone list of 100 Best Albums of the 2000s, the ninth best album of the decade for Entertainment Weekly, and the greatest of the decade for Vibe. The lead single, "SexyBack", helped introduce EDM sounds to top 40 radio, as it brought together variations of electronic dance music with Timberlake's R&B tone. Aside from earning critical acclaim for its parent album, Sia Michel of The New York Times noted that he was responsible for popularizing in 2006 the catchphrase "I'm bringing sexy back".

Considered a pop icon by media outlets, Timberlake has influenced numerous artists with his work. This includes Justin Bieber, Shawn Mendes, Olly Murs, Maroon 5, Britney Spears, Lorde, Marilyn Manson, Thomas Rhett, Ed Sheeran, Jason Derulo, Tori Kelly, Liam Payne, Bridgit Mendler, Hunter Hayes, BoA, Seungri, Taeyang, Rain, Lloyd Banks, Maluma, Rosalía, and Jungkook. Bieber and Nick Jonas have cited him as one of their role models, with the latter stating it is for "not only transitioning from where he started, but also balancing acting and singing". Christian hip hop artist TobyMac has stated Timberlake's work inspires him, commenting, "he's setting himself up to be a classic, making decisions and moving on them. That's a great place to be." In the context of male artists that achieved commercial success after leaving their boy bands, Brittany Spanos from Rolling Stone wrote, "Timberlake and Michael Jackson set a high bar for what could be attained by solo success in that they not only scored numerous number-one hits but they also crafted the mold for what it meant to be a male pop star", while Jeremy Blacklow of Variety called the singer "the modern case study". Multiple music publications have deemed Justified as the standard for post-boy-band solo albums and teen pop stars seeking credibility. Billboard critics discussed in 2018 whether Timberlake is "the Best Male Pop Star of the 21st century"; those in favor named his crossover appeal, career longevity, showmanship, and credibility within the industry among the reasons.

== Achievements ==
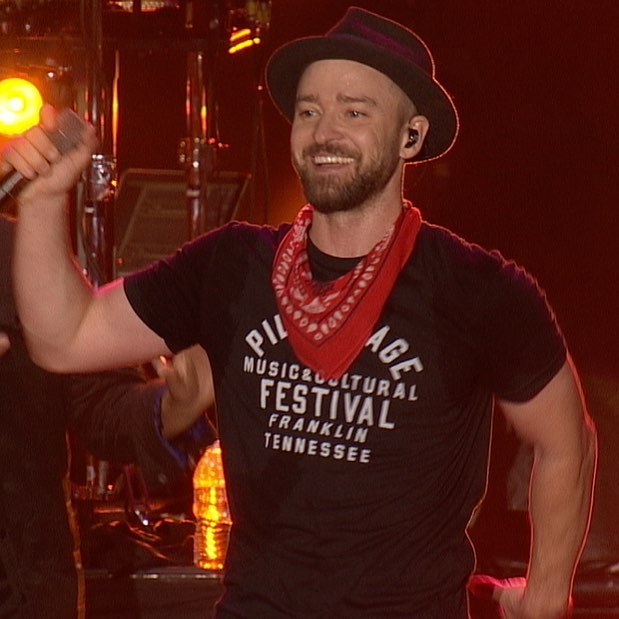
Timberlake at the 2017 Pilgrimage Music & Cultural Festival

Throughout his solo career, Timberlake has sold over 32 million albums and 56 million singles globally and a further 70 million records with NSYNC, making him one of the world's best-selling music artists. Timberlake has won ten Grammy Awards, four Emmy Awards, seven American Music Awards, three Brit Awards, nine Billboard Music Awards, and eleven MTV Video Music Awards. His Grammy wins include categories in the pop, dance, and R&B genres, while his Emmy wins consist of two Outstanding Original Music and Lyrics and two Outstanding Guest Actor in a Comedy Series. Timberlake received the Michael Jackson Video Vanguard Award at the 2013 MTV Video Music Awards and the Innovator Award at the 2015 iHeartRadio Music Awards. Among other awards, he won the MTV Video Music Award for Video of the Year for "Mirrors" in 2013 and the Billboard Music Award for Top Artist with the Top Billboard 200 Album for The 20/20 Experience in 2014. Timberlake received the inaugural Decade Award at the 2016 Teen Choice Awards for his continuous achievements since the release of FutureSex/LoveSounds (2006).

In October 2015, he was inducted into the Memphis Music Hall of Fame, becoming its youngest member. On April 30, 2018, Timberlake reunited with his NSYNC bandmates to receive a star on the Hollywood Walk of Fame. In 2019, Timberlake received a Contemporary Icon Award from the Songwriters Hall of Fame and an honorary Doctor of Music degree from Berklee College of Music.

Five of Timberlake's albums have been certified platinum or better by the RIAA and have received numerous awards. Worldwide sales figures for Justified stand at 10 million copies, FutureSex/LoveSounds at 10 million, and joint sales of The 20/20 Experience and 2 of 2 at 6 million copies. As of 2014, seven of Timberlake's songs had exceeded 3 million digital downloads in the United States, with "SexyBack" (4.5), "4 Minutes", "Dead and Gone", "Suit & Tie", "Mirrors", "Holy Grail", and "Can't Stop the Feeling!".

According to Billboard, FutureSex/LoveShow was the third highest-grossing concert tour of 2007 and the highest solo. The 20/20 Experience World Tour was an international success and became Timberlake's most successful tour to date. The tour was the highest-grossing led by a solo artist in 2014 and one of the highest-grossing tours of the decade. For its associated album, The 20/20 Experience, Timberlake was named 2013 Artist of the Year with the top-selling album by iTunes' annual list of bestsellers.

In the United States, five of Timberlake's singles have topped the Billboard Hot 100: "SexyBack", "My Love", "What Goes Around... Comes Around", "Give It to Me", and "Can't Stop the Feeling!". The latter became the 41st Hot 100 number one song to be nominated for an Academy Award for Best Original Song. He topped nine Billboard Year-End charts for 2013, including Billboard 200 Artists and Billboard 200 Albums. For 2014, Timberlake was named Billboard Top Male Artist. Billboard published a list of "Greatest of All-Time Pop Songs Artists" in 2017, where Timberlake ranked at number 5, being the top male soloist. The magazine also ranked him 25th on their "The Top 60 Male Artists of All-Time" list in 2018 and 64th on "The Hot 100's Top Artists of All Time". In 2019, Billboard ranked him 20th on their decade-end chart for "Top Artists" of the 2010s and 74th on the "Top 125 Greatest of All-Time Artists Chart".

== Other ventures ==
=== Business ventures ===
Timberlake has co-owned or provided celebrity endorsement for three restaurants in the United States: "Chi" opened in West Hollywood, California, in 2003, and "Destino" and "Southern Hospitality" in New York opened in 2006 and 2007, respectively. In 2005, Timberlake launched the William Rast clothing line with childhood friend Juan ("Trace") Ayala. The 2007 line contained cord jackets, cashmere sweaters, jeans, and polo shirts. The pair reported inspiration from fellow Memphis resident Elvis Presley: "Elvis is the perfect mixture of Justin and I", Ayala says. "You can go back and see pictures of him in cowboy boots and a cowboy hat and a nice button-down shirt, but then again you can see him in a tux and a collared shirt with rhinestones on it and slacks. We like to think 'If he was alive today, what would he be wearing?'" Target later announced that a William Rast collection, including denim, outerwear, and sportswear for men and women, would launch for a limited one-month run in December.

In 2015, the clothing line earned him a Lord & Taylor's Fashion Oracle Award at the Fashion Group International's Night of The Stars Gala. An avid golfer who plays to a six handicap, Timberlake purchased the run-down Big Creek Golf Course in his hometown of Millington, Tennessee in 2007, which he redeveloped as the eco-friendly Mirimichi Golf Course at the cost of around $16 million. It was reopened on July 25, 2009, but closed again on January 15, 2010, for further improvements expected to take six months. In October 2011, Timberlake received the Futures Award at the Environmental Media Awards for his green-conscious golf course. It was reported on November 7, 2014, that Timberlake had sold Mirimichi to Three Star Leasing LLC for $500,000. In October 2018, Timberlake and Levi's debuted their collaborative clothing line collection "Fresh Leaves". In 2022, Justin Timberlake invested in Greenville, South Carolina par-3 golf course Greenville 3's.

Timberlake provides celebrity endorsement for many commercial products, this aspect of his business being managed by IMG since April 2008. Major endorsements in 2009 included Sony electronic products, Givenchy's men's fragrance "Play", the Audi A1, and Callaway Golf Company products, and in 2011, Myspace. In 2011, he teamed up with Capital One to announce the winners of the inaugural Capital One Cup in a six-minute advertisement, where he was repeatedly hit in the groin. In 2012, he hosted Walmart's annual shareholders meeting, saying, "I buy a lot at Walmart." In 2014, Timberlake partnered with Sauza Tequila to relaunch his own version of the beverage as part of the Sauza franchise: Sauza 901. In 2016, he became an investor in the beverage company Bai Brands. In 2017, Tiger Woods and Timberlake acquired an ownership stake in the Hurricane Junior Golf Tour. Timberlake and his wife, Jessica Biel, are minority owners of the Memphis Grizzlies.

Timberlake is an Air Jordan brand ambassador. His first collection with the brand, the Legend of the Summer collection, debuted on the co-headlining tour of the same name with Jay-Z. These sneakers have gone on to resell for upwards of $10,000. In the lead-up to his 2018 Super Bowl Halftime Show, Timberlake worked with famed Nike, Inc. designer Tinker Hatfield to design his own version of the Air Jordan 3. Timberlake debuted the shoe at the halftime show. Timberlake's performance was estimated to be worth $2.86 million in marketing for Nike and is credited with reigniting interest in the Nike and Air Jordan brands. Nike went on to release several colorways as part of the collaboration with Timberlake. In May 2022, Timberlake sold the rights to his entire musical catalog, around 200 songs he wrote or co-wrote, to Hipgnosis Song Management for $100 million. The deal covers only pre-existing work and not work he produces after the deal.

In October 2005, the Grammy Association presented Timberlake with an award for his humanitarian efforts in Tennessee, alongside writer/director Craig Brewer, also a Memphis native. In November 2007, he donated $100,000 from the proceeds of his Australian tour to Wildlife Warriors, founded by Steve Irwin. On March 23, 2008, he donated $100,000 to the Memphis Rock N' Soul Museum and another $100,000 to the Memphis Music Foundation.

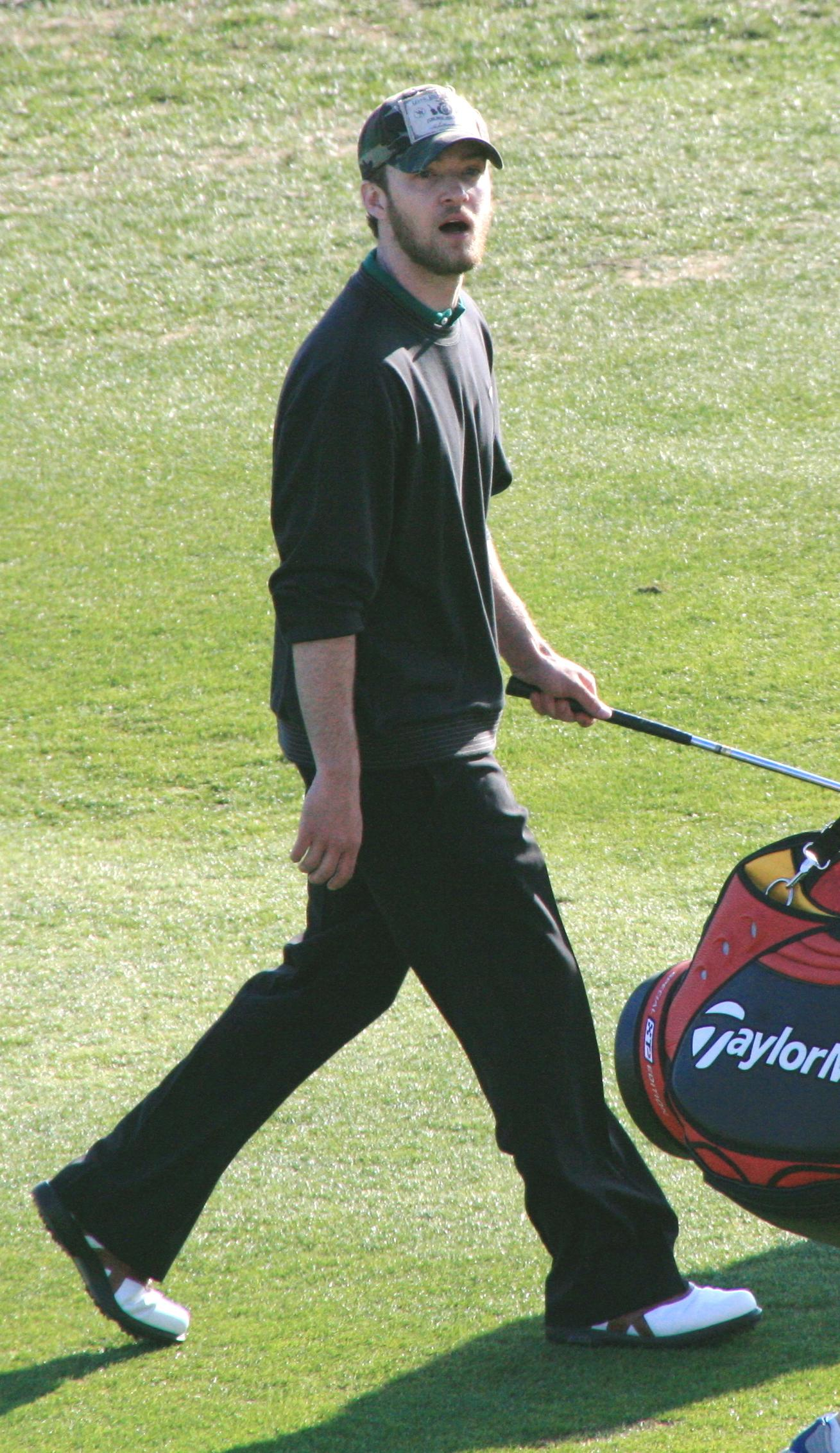
Timberlake in 2006

On November 12, 2007, the PGA Tour announced that Timberlake would become the host of the tour's Las Vegas tournament starting in 2008. With Timberlake's agreement to host the tournament, its name was changed to the Justin Timberlake Shriners Hospitals for Children Open. He played in the celebrity pro-am on the day before the competitive tournament and hosted a charity concert during the week of the tournament. The activity was a success and was repeated in 2009. A review of the value of celebrities to fundraising concluded that Timberlake's contribution to Shriners Hospitals for Children was the single most valuable celebrity endorsement in the U.S. during 2009 and worth over $US9 million. However, in 2012, the event's chair, Raoul Frevel, told reporters Timberlake would no longer be involved in the event: "We tried everything we could to get him more involved with our kids and the hospitals. But it seemed that when the TV cameras weren't on, he disappeared."

Timberlake often participates in the American Century Championship and the AT&T Pebble Beach Pro-Am. Both annual tournaments raise money for a range of national and local nonprofits.

In late 2012, Timberlake and his wife Jessica Biel volunteered in Far Rockaway, Queens over the weekend after Hurricane Sandy. Joined by their friend Timbaland, the couple helped distribute backpacks of supplies to members of the community who were still struggling after the hurricane.

Timberlake has donated items for auction for several charities, including by Ten O'Clock Classics. In 2016, Timberlake was featured in a new version of "Where Is the Love?". The proceeds of the charity single will go to educational programs. In 2017, Timberlake and Eminem helped raise over $2 million for Manchester Arena bombing victims.

=== Book ===
Timberlake's autobiography, Hindsight & All the Things I Can't See in Front of Me, was released on October 30, 2018. The book features candid on- and off-camera images, the singer's early life, and inspiration for songs. According to publisher HarperCollins, Hindsight includes a "collection of anecdotes, reflections, and observations on his life and work".

== Discography ==
Studio albums

- Justified (2002)
- FutureSex/LoveSounds (2006)
- The 20/20 Experience (2013)
- The 20/20 Experience – 2 of 2 (2013)
- Man of the Woods (2018)
- Everything I Thought It Was (2024)

== Filmography ==
Films starred

- Model Behavior (2000)
- Edison (2005)
- Alpha Dog (2006)
- Black Snake Moan (2006)
- Southland Tales (2007)
- Shrek the Third (2007)
- The Love Guru (2008)
- The Open Road (2009)
- The Social Network (2010)
- Yogi Bear (2010)
- Bad Teacher (2011)
- Friends with Benefits (2011)
- In Time (2011)
- Trouble with the Curve (2012)
- Runner Runner (2013)
- Inside Llewyn Davis (2013)
- Justin Timberlake + The Tennessee Kids (2016)
- Trolls (2016)
- Wonder Wheel (2017)
- Trolls World Tour (2020)
- Palmer (2021)
- Trolls Band Together (2023)
- Reptile (2023)
- Piece by Piece (2024)

== Tours ==
Headlining tours

- The Justified World Tour (2003–2004)
- FutureSex/LoveShow (2007)
- The 20/20 Experience World Tour (2013–2015)
- The Man of the Woods Tour (2018–2019)
- The Forget Tomorrow World Tour (2024–2025)

Co-headlining tours

- The Justified & Stripped Tour (with Christina Aguilera) (2003)
- Legends of the Summer Stadium Tour (with Jay-Z) (2013)

== See also ==
- List of best-selling music artists – Artists with sales of over 88 million records worldwide
- Honorific nicknames in popular music
- List of Billboard Social 50 number-one artists

Preceded by Martin Grubinger	Eurovision Song Contest; Final Interval act 2016	Succeeded by ONUKA
