= Mark White (Tennessee politician) =

American politician (born 1950)

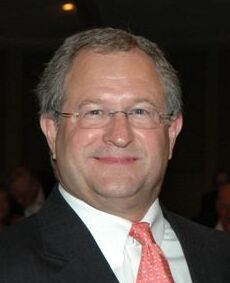

Member of the Tennessee House of Representatives from the 83rd district
- Incumbent
- Assumed office January 12, 2010
- Preceded by: Brian Kelsey

Personal details
- Born: March 11, 1950 (age 76) Union City, Tennessee, U.S.
- Party: Republican
- Spouse: Kathy
- Children: 1
- Education: University of Memphis (BS); Lipscomb University (MA)
- Website: House website

Mark White (born March 11, 1950, Union City, Tennessee) is an American politician who has been a member of the Tennessee House of Representatives since 2010. A Republican, he represents the 83rd district, encompassing Germantown, Bartlett, Cordova and portions of East Memphis.

White was formerly second vice-chairman of the Shelby County Republican Party. He was the Republican nominee for U.S. Congress in Tennessee's 9th congressional district in the 2006 election. White's opponents in the general election were Democrat Steve Cohen and independent Jake Ford. It was White's first bid for elected office. White placed third with 18 percent of the vote, well behind Cohen (60 percent) and Ford (22 percent). This was the worst showing for a Republican in the district since the 1950s.

White supported Rick Perry in his 2012 presidential campaign.

== Tennessee House of Representatives ==
In July 2009, Tennessee State Senator Paul Stanley of the 31st district resigned his seat. This prompted Brian Kelsey, who represented the 83rd district in the Tennessee House of Representatives, to resign and run for the vacant Senate seat. Kelsey's resignation triggered a special election. In a three-way race, White won the Republican primary. He then faced Democrat Guthrie Castle and Independent John Andreucetti in the general election, winning by a comfortable margin. White was elected to a full term in the seat later in 2010.

In 2023, White supported a resolution to expel three Democratic lawmakers from the legislature for violating decorum rules. The expulsion was widely characterized as unprecedented.
