= Mark White =

Mark White may refer to:

- Mark S. White (1851–?), American politician, member of the Florida House of Representatives
- Mark White (Texas politician) (1940–2017), American politician, governor of Texas
- Mark White (Tennessee politician) (born 1950), American politician from Tennessee
- Mark White (footballer, born 1958), English footballer for Reading
- Mark White (British musician) (born 1961), English singer, songwriter, guitarist and keyboardist with ABC
- Mark White (soccer, born 1961), American soccer player
- Mark White (bassist) (born 1962), American bassist for the Spin Doctors
- Mark White (Gaelic footballer) (born 1998), Irish Gaelic footballer

== See also ==
- Marcus White (born 1991), Australian rules footballer
- Markus White (born 1987), American football player
