= Brent Taylor (Tennessee politician) =

American politician (born 1968)

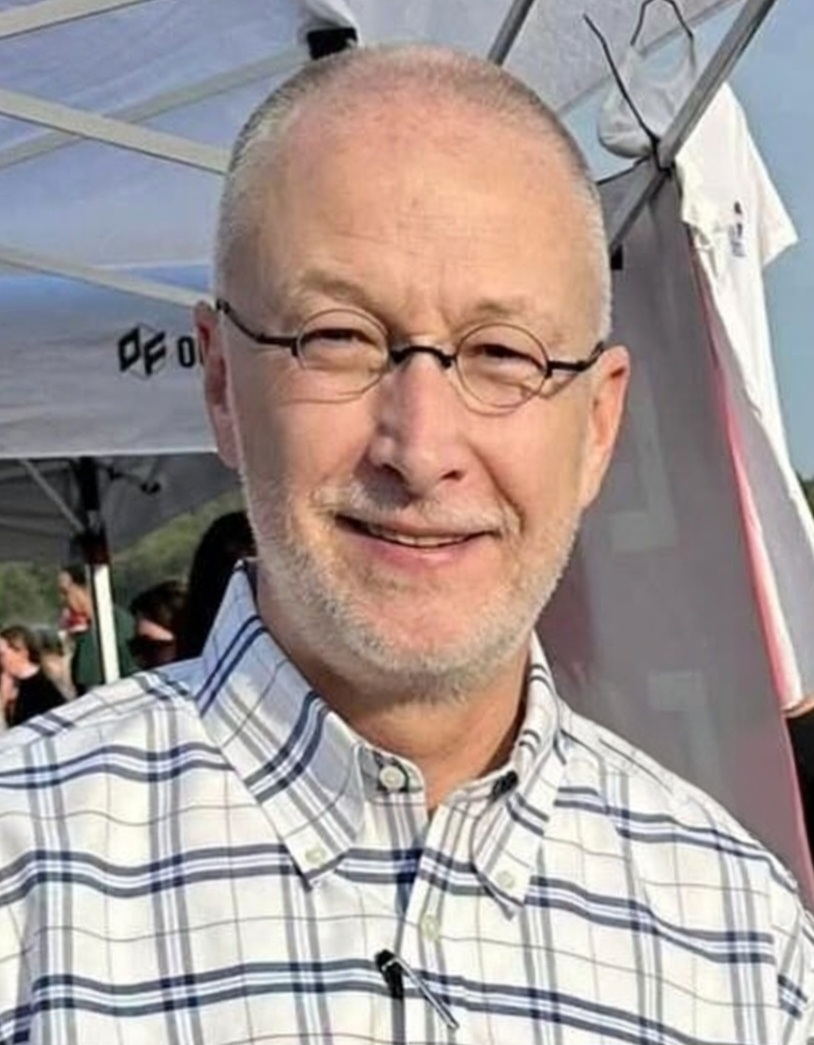
- Taylor in 2023

Member-elect of the U.S. House of Representatives from Tennessee's 9th district
- Assuming office January 3, 2027
- Succeeding: Steve Cohen

Member of the Tennessee Senate from the 31st district
- Incumbent
- Assumed office January 10, 2023
- Preceded by: Brian Kelsey

Member of the Memphis City Council from the 2nd district
- In office 1995–2007
- Preceded by: Position established
- Succeeded by: William Boyd

Personal details
- Born: Brent Louis Taylor; August 9, 1968 (age 58) Batesville, Mississippi, U.S.
- Party: Republican
- Spouse: Kimberly
- Children: 2
- Education: Northwest Mississippi Community College (AS)
- Website: Senate website Campaign website

Brent Louis Taylor (born August 9, 1968) is an American politician who has served since 2023 as a member of the Tennessee Senate representing District 31. A member of the Republican Party, he was previously a member of the Memphis City Council from 1995 to 2007. Taylor succeeded Brian Kelsey who had previously pled guilty to campaign finance charges and did not seek re-election. He narrowly defeated Democrat Justin J. Pearson to win the 2026 election for Tennessee's 9th congressional district.

A graduate of Northwest Mississippi Community College, Taylor began his career in funeral service. In 2011, he was appointed to the Shelby County Commission to fill the unexpired term of Mike Carpenter.

In October 2026, the Nashville Scene broke the news that Brent Taylor had sent unsolicited nude photos. Taylor confirmed sending the unsolicited images.

== Early life, education, and career ==
Brent Louis Taylor was born on August 9, 1968, in Batesville, Mississippi. As a teenager, he worked in his father's hardware store and lumberyard. Taylor earned a degree in mortuary science from Northwest Mississippi Community College. He later established Brent Taylor Funeral Directors.

Taylor successfully campaigned in the 2022 election in Tennessee's 31st Senate district defeating Democratic nominee Ruby-Powell Dennis. He has become known for his tough on crime stance. He voiced his support for SJR0919, an amendment to the Constitution of Tennessee that would remove bail for major capital crimes such as terrorism, second degree murder, aggravated rape of a child, aggravated rape, and grave torture.

== Political career ==
=== Memphis City Council ===
For the 1995 election, the Memphis City Council adopted a new redistricting plan, which called for the creation of seven regular districts and two "super districts" with three members each. Taylor ran in the newly created second district, which consisted of heavily conservative portions of East Memphis and recently annexed parts of Cordova. Taylor won, becoming the youngest member elected to the city council at the age of 27. He was re-elected in 1999 with 82% of the vote and was re-elected in 2003 with no opposition. Taylor served as council chairman in 2003.

Taylor developed a record of being a strong fiscal conservative, never voting for a tax increase, opposing business regulations, cutting the council budget (which resulted in a return of $163,000 to the general fund), and the removal of council perks such as subsidized cell phones. Taylor helped launch the Bounce Back Memphis Small Business Program, which supported small and local businesses in the city, Memphis' first Education Summit, and spearheading efforts to fund the World War II Memorial in Overton Park. During a severe summer storm in 2003, Taylor earned the nickname of "Little Guiliani" due to his leadership.

=== Shelby County Commission ===
Taylor was appointed to the Shelby County Commission in October 2011 to fill the unexpired term of Mike Carpenter. At his appointment, Taylor said he would work with both Democrats and Republicans to move county issues forward. He represented District 1, Position 3, and did not seek re-election in 2012.

== U.S House of Representatives ==
=== 2002 ===
In 2002, after U.S. Representative Ed Bryant declined to seek re-election in order to run for U.S. Senate, Taylor campaigned in the Republican primary for Tennessee's 7th congressional district. The district was drawn after the 2000 Census as a way to pack Republican voters in the Memphis and Nashville suburbs into one district. He lost the Republican primary to state senator Marsha Blackburn, who won with a plurality of 40.32%. Taylor finished third with 15.56% of the vote.

=== 2026 ===
After Tennessee redrew its Congressional Map following the Supreme Court decision in Louisiana v. Callais, Taylor announced his candidacy for the redrawn 9th congressional district. Taylor won the August 2026 Republican Primary, and he won the General Election in November against Democratic challenger Justin Pearson.

== Electoral history ==
=== 2002 ===
Republican primary results
Party	Candidate	Votes	%
Republican	Marsha Blackburn	36,633	40.32%
Republican	David Kustoff	18,392	20.24%
Republican	Brent Taylor	14,139	15.56%
Republican	Mark Norris	13,104	14.42%
Republican	Forrest Shoaf	7,319	8.06%
Republican	Sonny Carlota	642	0.71%
Republican	Randy Starkey	628	0.69%
Write-in		9	0.00%
Total votes		90,866	100.00%

=== 2022 ===
Republican primary
Party	Candidate	Votes	%
Republican	Brent Taylor	24,854	100.00%
Total votes		24,854	100.00%

General election
Party	Candidate	Votes	%
Republican	Brent Taylor	45,289	66.28%
Democratic	Ruby Powell-Dennis	23,041	33.72%
Total votes		68,330	100.00%

== Personal life and controversies ==
Taylor is married to his wife Kimberly and they have two adult children. Taylor resides in Eads, Tennessee. He is a member of Trinity Baptist Church.

On October 27, 2026, the Nashville Scene reported multiple sources had received or seen nude photos from Taylor. One individual, who requested anonymity, citing fear of retaliation, received an unsolicited nude photo as recently as 2021. A second eyewitness source independently confirmed the nude photos sent by Taylor. The story had been pitched to multiple media outlets prior to the Nashville Scene's story, but the other outlets declined to report due to there being only two anonymous sources willing to speak on the matter. It has been alleged that the story was pushed by Republicans. Some allege it was his former primary challenger, Todd Warner. Despite being 53 at the time he sent the photos, he dismissed the acts as "youthful indiscretions". In an interview with Matt Murphy, Taylor stated any photos sent were not unsolicited and he had been unfaithful to his wife years earlier and worked through it with her at the time. Taylor also said his wife is aware of these actions and has forgiven him. He shared saving his marriage was the "hardest thing [he had] ever done." Taylor's campaign manager, Luke Cymbal, chastised opponents of Taylor for mischaracterizing previous unfaithfulness from Taylor years before for political gain and described making a family relive a previously resolved issue as "disgusting."

U.S. House of Representatives
Preceded by Steve Cohen	Member of the U.S. House of Representatives from Tennessee's 9th congressional district Taking office 2027	Elect
