= List of Justin Timberlake live performances =

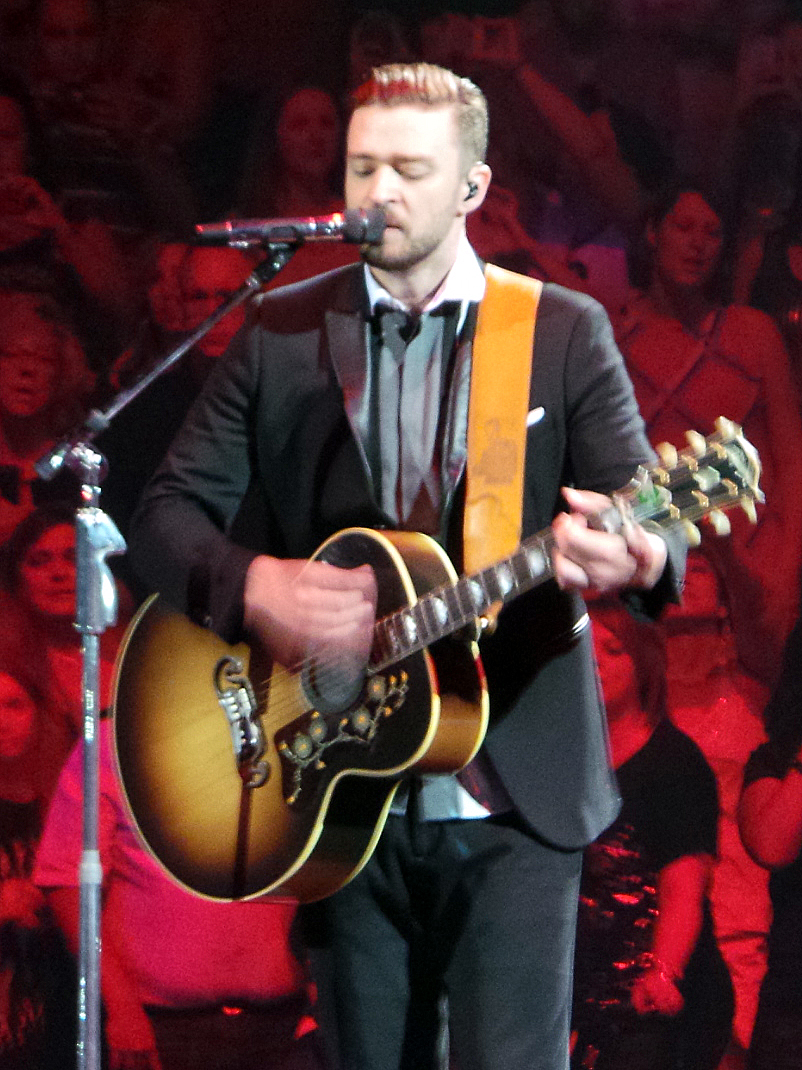
Justin Timberlake performing on his 20/20 Experience World Tour in 2014

American singer Justin Timberlake has embarked on seven concert tours during his solo career, five of which have been worldwide and two of which have been collaborative. (Note: The tours and performances by Justin Timberlake within the group NSYNC are not included.) His 2003 debut The Justified World Tour began with intimate gigs at clubs and theaters in the United States and Australia before expanding to arenas in Europe. In summer 2003, Timberlake and Christina Aguilera headlined The Justified & Stripped Tour. Later that year, he recorded the song "I'm Lovin' It", used by McDonald's as the theme to its "I'm Lovin' It" campaign. The deal with McDonald's earned Timberlake an estimated $6 million. A tour titled Justified and Lovin' It Live was included with the deal, following his initial Justified World Tour. For the release of his second album, FutureSex/LoveSounds, Timberlake embarked on his second worldwide tour FutureSex/LoveShow in 2007, which eventually became the third highest-grossing concert tour of the year. During the tour, he visited Asia, Europe, North America, and Oceania.

In 2013, Timberlake took part in his second collaborative tour, the Legends of the Summer Stadium Tour, co-headlining with frequent collaborator Jay-Z. The all-stadium tour that took place in North America was praised by music critics, who highlighted the great chemistry between both artists. It was followed by The 20/20 Experience World Tour, which became the second highest-grossing tour of 2014. This made Timberlake the highest-grossing solo touring artist of the year. The Man of the Woods Tour was Timberlake's sixth concert tour. It received positive reviews and concluded 2018 as the sixth-highest-grossing tour. The Forget Tomorrow World Tour is Timberlake's seventh and most recent tour. It has also received praise from critics. Timberlake's televised performances include his debut at the 2002 MTV Video Music Awards, the controversial Super Bowl XXXVIII halftime show as a guest act, his comeback performance at the 55th Annual Grammy Awards, his medley number at the 2013 MTV Video Music Awards, several appearances on Saturday Night Live and the Super Bowl LII halftime show.

== Concert tours ==
List of concert tours
Year	Title	Duration	Number of performances	Gross
2003–04	The Justified World Tour	May 7, 2003 – June 19, 2004 (Worldwide)	61	N/A
The Justified World Tour (also known as Lovin' It Live and Justified World Tour and Lovin' It Live) was Justin Timberlake's debut concert tour. The tour showcased material from his debut album, Justified (2002). The video album Justin Timberlake: Live from London was released on December 15, 2003, by Jive Records. It documents Timberlake's performance at the London Arena on May 18, 2003.
2003	The Justified & Stripped Tour	June 4, 2003 – September 2, 2003 (North America)	45	$30.2 million
Justin Timberlake's first co-headlining venture, the Justified and Stripped Tour, featured American singer Christina Aguilera. The setlist was generally composed of material from Timberlake's Justified and Aguilera's Stripped. However, both artists also added material from their early works, including Timberlake's work with NSYNC and Aguilera's self-titled debut album. The Justified and Stripped Tour was divided into five segments, two for Aguilera and three for Timberlake, with each segment being followed by an interlude to the next segment, and it ended with an encore, with the whole show lasting for a total of 160 minutes. An extended play, entitled Justin & Christina, was released exclusively at Target Stores to support the tour. The tour was met with mixed reviews from most contemporary music critics. Some praised the maturity of the two artists, while others criticized their vocal abilities during the tour. They also believed Timberlake's part worked his considerable sex appeal. The tour was a commercial success, becoming the sixteenth highest-grossing tour in 2003.
2007	FutureSex/LoveShow	January 8, 2007 – December 6, 2007 (Worldwide)	97	$126.8 million
Serving as Timberlake's second worldwide solo tour, FutureSex/LoveShow supported his second album, FutureSex/LoveSounds (2006). It was the third-highest-grossing concert tour of 2007 and drew more than 1.6 million people. Critics from Rolling Stone and The New York Times agreed that the show was "strictly grown and sexy" and Timberlake "has learned how to project sex-symbol edge." It featured several opening acts, including P!nk, Good Charlotte and Fergie. On November 19, 2007, a live video album named FutureSex/LoveShow: Live from Madison Square Garden was released.
2013	Legends of the Summer Stadium Tour	July 17, 2013 – August 16, 2013 (North America)	14	$75.3 million
The Legends of the Summer Stadium Tour was a co-headlining concert tour by Timberlake and American rapper Jay-Z. The tour supported Timberlake's third album, The 20/20 Experience (2013) and Jay Z's twelfth album, Magna Carta Holy Grail (2013). For a "special preview" of the tour both artists performed at the Olympic Park in London, England as part of the Wireless Festival. They performed in major stadiums across the U.S. and Canada. It was praised by critics, with Billboard's Karen Bliss writing "there was no one-upmanship, just camaraderie, not competition, two guys that work well together." With the 14 dates sold-out, it was the 15th highest-grossing tour of 2013.
2013–15	The 20/20 Experience World Tour	November 6, 2013 – January 2, 2015 (Worldwide)	134	$231.6 million
The 20/20 Experience World Tour was launched in support of his third and fourth albums, The 20/20 Experience (2013) and The 20/20 Experience – 2 of 2 (2013). The 20/20 Experience allowed Timberlake to throw back to the big-band era, its stage production embraced a vintage sheen and everyone in classic suits. Timberlake had a horn section onstage with him called The Regiment Horns, among the big-band orchestra the Tennessee Kids. During the tour, Timberlake visited Africa, Asia, Europe, North America and Oceania. The tour received acclaim from critics, and became the second highest-grossing tour of 2014. This made Timberlake the highest-grossing solo touring artist of the year. Canadian singer The Weeknd featured as the opening act in selected North America dates. Showcasing the final date of the tour at Las Vegas' MGM Grand Garden Arena, the space-age themed concert film—titled JT + The Tennessee Kids and directed by Jonathan Demme—premiered at the 2016 Toronto International Film Festival. The concert film was released on streaming service Netflix in October 2016.
2018–19	The Man of the Woods Tour	March 13, 2018 – April 13, 2019 (Worldwide)	115	$226.3 million
Timberlake embarked on The Man of the Woods Tour in support of his fifth album, Man of the Woods (2018). The Man of the Woods Tour received positive reviews from critics, and was the sixth highest-grossing tour of 2018. Billboard critics ranked The Man of the Woods Tour as one of the best live shows of 2018. David Menconi of The News & Observer said "Justin Timberlake returns to the stage and proves why he's America's pop star", and noted him as "The Prince of Pop". He also said of the show that Timberlake "Sang quite well... But he danced even better, and that's what turned the crowd on most of all. How he moved was at least as important as how he sang." Chris Conde of San Antonio Current deemed it "an spectacle of undeniable talent... Even if you don't like pop music, Timberlake's show was so rich in musicianship and showmanship that anyone wanting to say something bad would be hard-pressed to, ahem, justify a negative review."
2024–25	The Forget Tomorrow World Tour	April 29, 2024 – February 24, 2025 (Worldwide)	94	$205.2 million
Timberlake embarked on The Forget Tomorrow World Tour in support of his sixth album, Everything I Thought It Was (2024). The Forget Tomorrow World Tour received positive reviews from critics. Reporter Stuart Derdeyn of the Vancouver Sun stated, "If you were at the launch of Justin Timberlake's Forget Tomorrow World tour at Rogers Arena last night, you know you caught the best show the singer has ever played in Vancouver", and concluded that "The Forget Tomorrow Tour puts Justin Timberlake back in the star chamber for sure." The Seattle Times music writer Michael Rietmulder also gave the tour a positive review. He felt that "Justin Timberlake was in his element. Gliding, sliding, and stepping across the stage like an air-walking Morris Day out in front of an 11-piece band and brigade of dancers during an opening "No Angels" on Thursday. [...] his star power, [...] is still bright enough to pack an arena — twice." He also credited Timberlake as being "One of this century's most well-rounded entertainers, the classic song-and-dance man is cut from a cloth that doesn't exist in the contemporary pop landscape quite the same way it once did." Jim Harrington of The Mercury News praised the performance aspect of the show, stating that "Timberlake is nothing short of a marvelous performer, boosting great dance moves, plenty of charisma and star power, an ability to connect deeply with a crowd, solid comedic timing and a knack for showing his fans a good time."

== Concerts ==
List of concerts
Event	Date	Notes
Super Bowl XXXVIII halftime show	February 1, 2004	On February 1, 2004, Timberlake performed with pop singer Janet Jackson during her performance at the Super Bowl XXXVIII halftime show. At the moment he sang the lyric "Bet I'll have you naked by the end of this song" in "Rock Your Body", he ripped off part of Jackson's outfit, momentarily exposing her right breast on live television. Timberlake distanced himself from the controversy while Jackson faced much criticism and backlash. He later commented that "America's harsher on women ... [and] unfairly harsh on ethnic people."
DirecTV Super Saturday Night	February 2, 2013	After four years not performing in concert, Timberlake appeared the night before the 2013 Super Bowl and performed during the "DirecTV Super Saturday Night" in New Orleans. Backed by a full band and four backup singers called the Tennessee Kids, the hour-and-a-half setlist featured two songs from his upcoming album The 20/20 Experience ("Pusher Love Girl" and "That Girl"). Jay Z and Timbaland were featured guests.
Eurovision Song Contest 2016	May 14, 2016	On May 14, 2016, Timberlake performed at the Eurovision Song Contest in Stockholm, Sweden. He served as a non-competitive interval act before the results of the contest were announced. Backed by the Tennessee Kids, he opened with "Rock Your Body", followed by the first live performance of "Can't Stop the Feeling" as part of a promotional tour for the new single.
Super Bowl LII halftime show	February 4, 2018	On February 4, 2018, Timberlake performed at the Super Bowl LII halftime show, marking his second halftime show performance at the Super Bowl. For the first time since the Super Bowl XLVI halftime show in Indianapolis in 2012, no pyrotechnics were used throughout the performance. The show relied mostly on lasers and video screens for visual effects. Timberlake's performance received mixed reviews.

== Guest act ==
List of live performances as a guest act
Title	Date	Notes
Hard Candy Promo Show	March 30, 2008	Timberlake and Madonna performed their collaboration "4 Minutes" at Roseland Ballroom in New York City.
Sticky & Sweet Tour	November 6, 2008	Timberlake performed "4 Minutes" with Madonna on the Los Angeles stop of her concert tour.
The 1989 World Tour	August 26, 2015	Timberlake and Taylor Swift performed "Mirrors" at Staples Center. The performance and rehearsals were featured on concert documentary The 1989 World Tour Live.

== Award show performances ==
List of award show performances
Event	Date	City	Performed song(s)	Refs.
2002 MTV Video Music Awards	August 29, 2002	New York City, New York	"Like I Love You" (with Clipse)	
2002 Billboard Music Awards	December 9, 2002	Las Vegas, Nevada	"Cry Me a River"	
2003 BRIT Awards	February 20, 2003	London, England	"Cry Me a River" / "Like I Love You" / "Rapture" (with Kylie Minogue)	
2003 Soul Train Music Awards	March 1, 2003	Pasadena, California	"Cry Me a River" / "Rock Your Body" / "Like I Love You"	
2003 Nickelodeon Kids' Choice Awards	April 12, 2003	Santa Monica, California	"Rock Your Body"	
2003 MTV Europe Music Awards	November 6, 2003	Edinburgh, Scotland	"Where Is the Love?" (with The Black Eyed Peas)	
46th Annual Grammy Awards	February 8, 2004	Los Angeles, California	"Señorita" (with Arturo Sandoval); "Where Is the Love?" (with The Black Eyed Peas)	
2006 MTV Video Music Awards	August 31, 2006	New York City, New York	"My Love" / "SexyBack" (with Timbaland)	
2006 MTV Europe Music Awards	November 2, 2006	Copenhagen, Denmark	"SexyBack" / "My Love" / "LoveStoned"	
49th Annual Grammy Awards	February 11, 2007	Los Angeles, California	"What Goes Around... Comes Around"; "Ain't No Sunshine" / "My Love" (with Robyn Troup and T.I.)	
2007 MTV Video Music Awards	September 9, 2007	Las Vegas, Nevada	"LoveStoned" / "Give It to Me" (with Timbaland and Nelly Furtado)	
51st Annual Grammy Awards	February 8, 2009	Los Angeles, California	"Let's Stay Together" (with Al Green, Keith Urban and Boyz II Men); "Dead and Gone" (with T.I.)	
55th Annual Grammy Awards	February 10, 2013	Los Angeles, California	"Suit & Tie" (with Jay Z); "Pusher Love Girl"	
2013 BRIT Awards	February 20, 2013	London, England	"Mirrors"	
2013 BET Awards	June 30, 2013	Los Angeles, California	"Charlie, Last Name, Wilson" (tribute to Charlie Wilson); "Signs" / "You Dropped a Bomb on Me" / "Outstanding" (with Charlie Wilson, Snoop Dogg and Pharrell Williams)	
2013 MTV Video Music Awards	August 25, 2013	New York City, New York	"Take Back the Night" / "SexyBack" / "Like I Love You" / "My Love" / "Cry Me a River" / "Señorita" / "Rock Your Body" / "Girlfriend" (with 'N Sync) / "Bye Bye Bye" (with 'N Sync) / "Suit & Tie" / "Mirrors"	
2013 American Music Awards	November 24, 2013	Los Angeles, California	"Drink You Away"	
2015 Country Music Association Awards	November 4, 2015	Nashville, Tennessee	"Tennessee Whiskey" / "Drink You Away" (with Chris Stapleton)	
89th Academy Awards	February 26, 2017	Los Angeles, California	"Can't Stop the Feeling!" / "Lovely Day"	
2018 Brit Awards	February 21, 2018	London, England	"Midnight Summer Jam" / "Say Something" (with Chris Stapleton)	
2024 iHeartRadio Music Awards	April 2, 2024	Los Angeles, California	"Selfish" / "No Angels"	

== See also ==
- Justin Timberlake videography
