= Steve McManus =

American politician (born 1951)

Member of the Tennessee House of Representatives from the 96th district
- In office January 9, 2007 – January 10, 2017
- Preceded by: Paul Stanley
- Succeeded by: Dwayne Thompson

Personal details
- Born: Stephen McManus; October 16, 1951 (age 75)
- Party: Republican
- Children: 2
- Education: College of the Holy Cross (BA)
- Website: House website

Stephen McManus (born October 16, 1951) is an American politician who was a Republican member of the Tennessee House of Representatives. He represented the 96th district, encompassing Cordova and part of Shelby County, from 2007 to 2017.

== Early life and education ==
Stephen McManus was born on October 16, 1951. He received a BA from the College of the Holy Cross in Worcester, Massachusetts.

== Career ==
McManus has worked as an investment adviser and a regional business commentator on Fox News. He is a past president of the Cordova Leadership Council. He is also a member of the Commerce, Insurance and Economic Development Task Force of the American Legislative Exchange Council (ALEC).

== Tennessee House of Representatives (2007–2017) ==
=== Elections ===
McManus was first elected to the Tennessee House of Representatives in 2006, succeeding Paul Stanley who successfully sought election to the Tennessee Senate. McManus won four re-election campaigns before being defeated in his 2016 bid for a sixth term by Democratic nominee Dwayne Thompson in what was considered an upset.

=== Tenure ===
McManus chaired the House Insurance and Banking Committee and was a member of the Calendar and Rules, and Finance, Ways & Means committees. Alongside Senator Becky Duncan Massey and Representative Kevin Brooks, McManus co-sponsored the Tennessee ABLE Act, authorizing the creation of tax-advantaged investment plans for families of people with disabilities. The bill was signed into law by Bill Haslam on May 18, 2015.

== Personal life ==
He is married with two children. He is a Roman Catholic.
