= Paul Stanley (Tennessee politician) =

American politician (born 1962)

Member of the Tennessee Senate from the 31st district
- In office January 9, 2007 – August 10, 2009
- Preceded by: Curtis S. Person Jr.
- Succeeded by: Brian Kelsey

Member of the Tennessee House of Representatives from the 96th district
- In office January 9, 2001 – January 9, 2007
- Preceded by: Joyce Barnett Hassell
- Succeeded by: Steve McManus

Personal details
- Born: June 1, 1962 (age 64) Savannah, Tennessee, U.S.
- Party: Republican
- Spouse: Married
- Children: 2
- Education: Tyler Junior College (AA); Texas Tech University (BS)
- Website: House website Senate website

Paul Stanley (born June 1, 1962 in Savannah, Tennessee) is an American politician and a Republican former member of the Tennessee Senate. He was elected as a state senator to the 105th Tennessee General Assembly, after having previously served in the Tennessee House of Representatives during the 102nd, 103rd, and 104th General Assemblies. Stanley represented the 31st district, which is part of Shelby County.

During his time in office, Stanley served in leadership roles in many Republican organizations. In 1995, he was the Vice-Chair of Finance of the Shelby County Republican Party. From 1995 to 1997, he was the State Chairman of the Tennessee Young Republican Federation. From 1997 to 1999, he was the Vice-Chairman of the Young Republican National Federation. From 1998 until 2001, he was a member of the Republican State Executive Committee. Before becoming a state senator, Stanley was the Minority Floor Leader in the state House of Representatives. In 2006 he was elected to the State Senate where he served as Chairman of the Commerce, Labor and Agriculture committee.

In 2009, Stanley resigned from his seat amidst allegations that he had an affair with a 22-year-old intern, whose boyfriend attempted to extort $10,000 from Stanley in return for possible nude photos. Instead, Stanley reported the incident and resigned.

Stanley earned his Associate of Arts degree from Tyler Junior College. In 1985, he graduated from Texas Tech University with a Bachelor of Science degree. He was at one time the political section editor for The Christian Post.

Preceded by Curtis S. Person, Jr.	Tennessee State Senator For the 31st District; 2007-2009	Succeeded by Brian Kelsey
