= Curtis S. Person Jr. =

American politician (1934–2020)

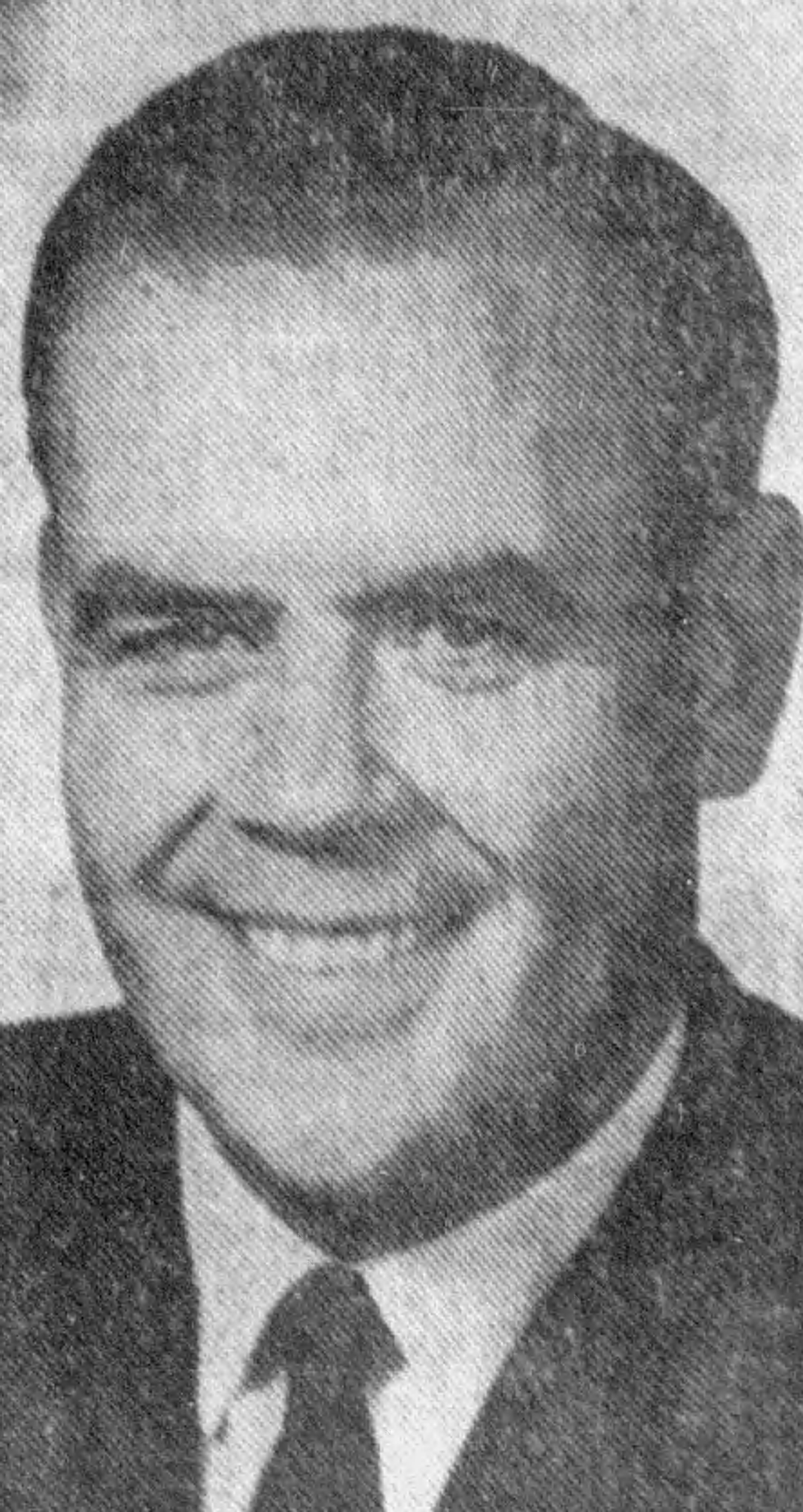
- A photograph of Person c. 1970

Member of the Tennessee Senate from the 31st district
- In office 1968–2006
- Succeeded by: Paul Stanley

Personal details
- Born: November 27, 1934 Memphis, Tennessee
- Died: September 4, 2020 (aged 85) Memphis, Tennessee
- Party: Republican

Curtis S. Person Jr. (November 27, 1934 – September 4, 2020) was an American politician and a member of the Tennessee Senate for the 31st district, which is composed of part of Shelby County. He initially served in the Tennessee House of Representatives from 1966 to 1968 as a Democrat but shortly after switched parties, before serving in the state senate from 1968 until 2006. He served as the chair of the Judiciary Committee and as a member on the Ethics Committee and the General Welfare, Health and Human Resources Committee.

Curtis S. Person served in many local leadership positions in Shelby County and in the Republican Party. He was Vice-Chairman of the Shelby County Legislative Delegation in 1970, 1975, 1976, and from 1985 to 1988. He was Chairman in 1977, 1983, and 1984, and Co-Chairman during 1973 and 1974. From 1973 to 1976, he was the Tennessee Senate Republican Whip, and he was Assistant Senate Republican Leader during the 96th Tennessee General Assembly. He was also Chairman of the Tennessee Republican Caucus from 1976 to 1982.

Curtis S. Person graduated from the University of Memphis in 1956 with a Bachelor of Science degree, and from the University of Mississippi in 1959 with a Bachelor of Laws degree. He has been the Chief Legal Officer of the Juvenile Court of Memphis and Shelby County since 1995. He had previously been the Chief Referee of the Juvenile Court of Memphis and Shelby County from 1977 to 1995.

During 1970 and 1971, Curtis S. Person was the President of the University of Memphis National Alumni Association and the Chairman of the Memphis Commission on Drug Abuse. From 1969 to 1973, he was the President of the Memphis-Shelby County Mental Health Association. From 1965 to 1966, he was the Charter President of the University of Memphis Tiger Rebounders. He is also a former director of the Southern Golf Association.

He died on September 4, 2020, in Memphis, Tennessee at age 85.
