= Dwayne Thompson =

American politician (born 1950)

Member of the Tennessee House of Representatives from the 96th district
- In office January 10, 2017 – January 14, 2025
- Preceded by: Steve McManus
- Succeeded by: Gabby Salinas

Personal details
- Born: October 6, 1950 (age 76) Memphis, Tennessee, U.S.
- Party: Democratic
- Spouse: Jennifer Thompson
- Children: 2
- Education: University of Memphis (BA)
- Website: House website

Dwayne Thompson (born October 6, 1950) is an American politician. He is a Democrat who represented District 96 in the Tennessee House of Representatives for four terms.

== Political career ==
In 2014, Thompson ran for election to represent District 10 in the Tennessee House of Representatives, but lost to Republican incumbent Steve McManus. In 2016, he ran again, and defeated McManus in a race decided by 365 votes. Thompson was re-elected in 2018, and is running again in 2020.

As of June 2020, Thompson sits on the following committees:

- Consumer and Human Resources Committee
- Consumer and Human Resources Subcommittee
- Insurance Committee
- Property & Casualty Subcommittee

=== Electoral record ===
2014 general election: Tennessee House of Representatives, District 96
Party	Candidate	Votes	%
Republican	Steve McManus	9,990	62%
Democratic	Dwayne Thompson	6,123	38%

2016 Democratic primary: Tennessee House of Representatives, District 96
Party	Candidate	Votes	%
Democratic	Dwayne Thompson	1,481	60.08%
Democratic	Earl LeFlore	984	39.92%

2016 general election: Tennessee House of Representatives, District 96
Party	Candidate	Votes	%
Democratic	Dwayne Thompson	14,150	50.65%
Republican	Steve McManus	13,785	49.35%

Thompson was unopposed in the 2018 Democratic primary for the District 96 seat.

2018 general election: Tennessee House of Representatives, District 96
Party	Candidate	Votes	%
Democratic	Dwayne Thompson	14,829	57.4%
Republican	Scott McCormick	11,007	42.6%
