= Mark S. White =

American politician

Mark S. White (December 12, 1851 – ?) was a teacher and politician in Florida. He lived in Pensacola and represented Escambia County, Florida in the Florida House of Representatives in 1883. He belonged to the Knights of Labor. He was described as "mulatto".

He was born in Montgomery, Alabama. He served as an election official.

== See also ==
- African American officeholders from the end of the Civil War until before 1900
