= Tennessee's 31st Senate district =

American legislative district

Tennessee's 31st State Senate district
Senator
Brent Taylor; R–Memphis
- Demographics: 70% White; 18% Black; 4% Hispanic; 6% Asian; 2% Multiracial
- Population (2022): 204,216

Tennessee's 31st Senate district is one of 33 districts in the Tennessee Senate. It has been represented by Republican Brent Taylor since 2022. During redistricting in 2022, it was drawn in a more Republican friendly part of Shelby County.

== Geography ==
District 31 covers parts of Memphis and its immediate suburbs to the east, including Germantown and most of Collierville, and some of unincorporated Shelby County.

The district overlaps with Tennessee's 8th and 9th congressional districts.

== Recent election results ==
Tennessee Senators are elected to staggered four-year terms, with odd-numbered districts holding elections in midterm years and even-numbered districts holding elections in presidential years.

=== 2022 ===
Republican primary
Party	Candidate	Votes	%
Republican	Brent Taylor	24,854	100
Total votes		24,854	100

Democratic primary
Party	Candidate	Votes	%
Democratic	Ruby Powell-Dennis	12,207	100
Total votes		12,207	100

Tennessee's 31st State Senate District General Election, 2022
Party	Candidate	Votes	%
Republican	Brent Taylor	45,289	66.28%
Democratic	Ruby Powell-Dennis	23,041	33.72%
Total votes		68,330	100%

=== 2018 ===
2018 Tennessee Senate election, District 31
Primary election
Party	Candidate	Votes	%
Democratic	Gabby Salinas	7,737	48.0
Democratic	David Weatherspoon	6,890	42.7
Democratic	M. Rodanial Ray Ransom	1,499	9.3
Total votes		16,126	100
General election
Republican	Brian Kelsey (incumbent)	40,504	50.9
Democratic	Gabby Salinas	39,086	49.1
Total votes		79,590	100
Republican hold			

=== 2014 ===
2014 Tennessee Senate election, District 31
Party	Candidate	Votes	%
Republican	Brian Kelsey (incumbent)	39,646	100
Total votes		39,646	100
Republican hold			

=== Federal and statewide results ===
Year	Office	Results
2020	President	Biden 53.2 – 45.1%
2016	President	Trump 50.4 – 45.5%
2012	President	Romney 60.2 – 38.8%
2012	Senate	Corker 67.0 – 30.0%
