= Brian Kelsey =

American politician (born 1977)

Member of the Tennessee Senate from the 31st district
- In office December 1, 2009 – January 10, 2023
- Preceded by: Paul Stanley
- Succeeded by: Brent Taylor

Member of the Tennessee House of Representatives from the 83rd district
- In office January 11, 2005 – December 1, 2009
- Preceded by: Joe Kent
- Succeeded by: Mark White

Personal details
- Born: December 22, 1977 (age 48) Memphis, Tennessee, U.S.
- Party: Republican
- Spouse: Amanda
- Education: University of North Carolina, Chapel Hill (BA); Georgetown University (JD)

Brian Kelsey (born December 22, 1977) is an American politician and former member of the Tennessee State Senate. A member of the Republican party, he was elected to represent District 31, which encompassed the following parts of Shelby County: Cordova, East Memphis, and Germantown.

In November 2022, Kelsey pleaded guilty to violating two federal campaign finance laws in connection with his failed 2016 congressional campaign. Kelsey was pardoned by President Donald Trump on March 12, 2025.

== Early life and education ==
Kelsey was born in 1977. He attended prekindergarten through high school on scholarship at private schools and graduated with a Bachelor of Arts degree with honors from the University of North Carolina at Chapel Hill. He earned his J.D. from Georgetown University.

== Career ==
From 2009 to 2018, he worked at The Kelsey Firm, PLLC.

Brian Kelsey was first elected as a state representative to the 104th Tennessee General Assembly (2004–2006). He served on the House Children and Family Affairs Committee; the House Commerce Committee; the House Domestic Relations Subcommittee; and the House Utilities, Banking and Small Business Subcommittee. Kelsey was the former chairman of the House Civil Practice Subcommittee.

Kelsey ran for the District 31 seat vacated after the resignation of former Senator Paul Stanley. In 2010, Kelsey won re-election for a full term as the Senator from the Thirty-First District.

In the 106th General Assembly, Kelsey served on the Senate Government Operations Committee and the Senate Judiciary Committee.

In the 107th General Assembly, Kelsey was assigned to the Senate Finance, Ways, and Means Committee; the Senate Judiciary Committee; and he was named Secretary of the Senate Education Committee. Kelsey was also admitted to the Joint Committee on Fiscal Review, which consists of members from both chambers who oversee the Fiscal Review Office.

During the 110th General Assembly, Kelsey serves as the Chairman of the Senate Judiciary Committee.

Kelsey is a member in the American Legislative Exchange Council (ALEC), having attended meetings of the organization.

Kelsey ran unopposed in 2014 for the District 31 seat.

Kelsey is the only legislator in Tennessee history to sponsor three successful amendments to the state constitution: the first prohibited a state income tax, the second changed the selection of state appellate judges from popular vote to gubernatorial appointment, and the third added a new section to the Tennessee Constitution to make it illegal for workplaces to require mandatory labor union membership for employees as a condition for employment. He also sponsored the Governor's comprehensive tort reform act in 2011, and passed a law to prohibit Obamacare Medicaid expansion in Tennessee in 2014. In 2019, his conference committee report instituting an Education Savings Account program was signed into law by Governor Bill Lee. In 2021, Kelsey was one of four Republican senators who voted against removing from the Tennessee constitution the article which allows involuntary servitude as punishment for people convicted of a crime.

In March 2022, following his indictment by a federal grand jury in October 2021, Kelsey announced he would not be seeking re-election.

== Campaign finance scheme, guilty plea and pardon ==
On Monday, October 25, 2021, the U.S. Department of Justice announced a five-count indictment by a federal grand jury against Kelsey in connection with his failed 2016 congressional campaign. Kelsey was indicted for violating multiple campaign finance laws, including soft money contributions in violation of the Bipartisan Campaign Reform Act of 2002. The indictment states that over $100,000 was funneled from a state committee to Kelsey's federal campaign, and illegal excess contributions were made to the federal campaign and concealed from the Federal Election Commission.

Kelsey initially pleaded not guilty until his co-defendant, Nashville social club owner Joshua Smith, pleaded guilty in October 2022. On November 22, 2022, Kelsey pled guilty to conspiracy to defraud the Federal Election Commission as well as aiding and abetting the acceptance of excessive contributions on behalf of a federal campaign. Judge Crenshaw sentenced him to 21 months in prison, taking into account character witnesses testimony.

On December 8, 2022, Kelsey's law license was suspended by the Tennessee Supreme Court after a request from the court's Board of Professional Responsibility. After serving 15 days of the 21-month sentence, Kelsey was pardoned by President Donald Trump on March 12, 2025.

== See also ==
- List of people granted executive clemency in the second Trump presidency

Tennessee House of Representatives
Preceded by Joe Kent	Tennessee Representative; 83rd District; 2004–2009	Succeeded by Mark White
Tennessee Senate
Preceded by Paul Stanley	Tennessee Senator; 31st District; 2009–2022	Succeeded by Brent Taylor
