= The Man of the Woods Tour =

2018–19 concert tour by Justin Timberlake

- Tour by Justin Timberlake
- Location: Europe; North America
- Associated album: Man of the Woods
- Start date: March 13, 2018
- End date: April 13, 2019
- Legs: 3
- No. of shows: 115
- Supporting acts: Bazzi; Choppa; Francesco Yates; The Shadowboxers
- Attendance: 1.75 million
- Box office: $226.3 million ($283.37 million in 2024 dollars)

Justin Timberlake concert chronology
- The 20/20 Experience World Tour (2013–15); The Man of the Woods Tour (2018–19); The Forget Tomorrow World Tour (2024–25)

The Man of the Woods Tour was the sixth concert tour by American singer-songwriter Justin Timberlake. Launched in support of his fifth studio album, Man of the Woods (2018), the tour began on March 13, 2018, in Toronto and concluded on April 13, 2019, in Uncasville. The Man of the Woods Tour was the sixth-highest-grossing tour of 2018. During its thirteen-month run from March 2018 to April 2019, the tour sold over 1.75 million tickets and grossed a total of over $226.3 million from 115 shows, making it Timberlake's second most successful tour to date behind only The 20/20 Experience World Tour, which grossed over $231.6 million from 134 shows, though Timberlake's per-night basis for the tour had a higher average at $1.96 million per-show than that of the 20/20 Experience World Tour, which averaged $1.81 million per-show.

== Background ==
The tour was first announced in January 2018, and due to demand additional dates were released soon after. On February 5, 2018, the day following Timberlake's Super Bowl LII halftime show, Timberlake announced European tour dates, as well as second and third North American tour dates. Timberlake toured Europe after the first North American leg, then toured North America again starting in the fall. The third North American leg began in January 2019. From November to December 2018, due to Timberlake suffering from bruised vocal cords, he was forced to postpone all remaining 2018 tour dates, resulting in the tour concluding in April 2019.

== Show ==
During a portion of the concert, Timberlake and his band the "Tennessee Kids" sing around a campfire. The "Stage Bar" VIP Experience on the tour includes a bar near the center stage, and a drink ticket. A disco dance floor is near the stage, where Timberlake performs "Rock Your Body"

The design is based off [sic] the floodplain maps of the Mississippi River as it runs through Memphis, which is his hometown. We wanted it to be a really organic, never-before-seen type stage that ran through the entire arena and engaged all the fans so everyone could have a front row seat.

— Nick Whitehouse, creative producer/lighting designer for the tour.

== Commercial performance ==
In May 2018, Billboard reported grosses totalling $36.6 million from the first five weeks, with 255,780 attendees at 16 shows, thus reaching number one on the magazine's weekly ranking Hot Tours. The magazine expects the tour to reach a total of $275 million and 2 million attendees by the time it concludes. Timberlake's sold-out Orlando concert on May 14 was the highest-grossing, single-day concert in Amway Center history with $2,387,112 and 17,839 attendees.

Timberlake's September 20 night concert at Rupp Arena grossed $2 million, making it the highest-grossing one-night concert in the arena's history, besting the previous record set by the Eagles, which grossed $1.8 million in June 2015.

His January 26, 2019 concert at the Chesapeake Energy Arena set a new record for highest-grossing show in Oklahoma City's history.

StubHub named Timberlake the fifth-best selling live artist in the US in 2018. According to Billboard, the Man of the Woods Tour was the sixth-highest-grossing tour of the year, selling over 1,175,216 tickets and grossing over $149 million in 2018. The tour received a nomination for Best Pop Tour at the 30th Pollstar Awards.

During its thirteen-month run from March 2018 to April 2019, the Man of the Woods Tour sold over 1.75 million tickets and grossed a total of over $226.3 million from 115 shows, making it Timberlake's second most successful tour to date behind only The 20/20 Experience World Tour, which grossed over $231.6 million from 134 shows, though Timberlake's per-night basis for the Man of the Woods Tour had a higher average at $1.96 million per-show than that of the 20/20 Experience World Tour, which averaged $1.81 million per-show.

== Critical reception ==
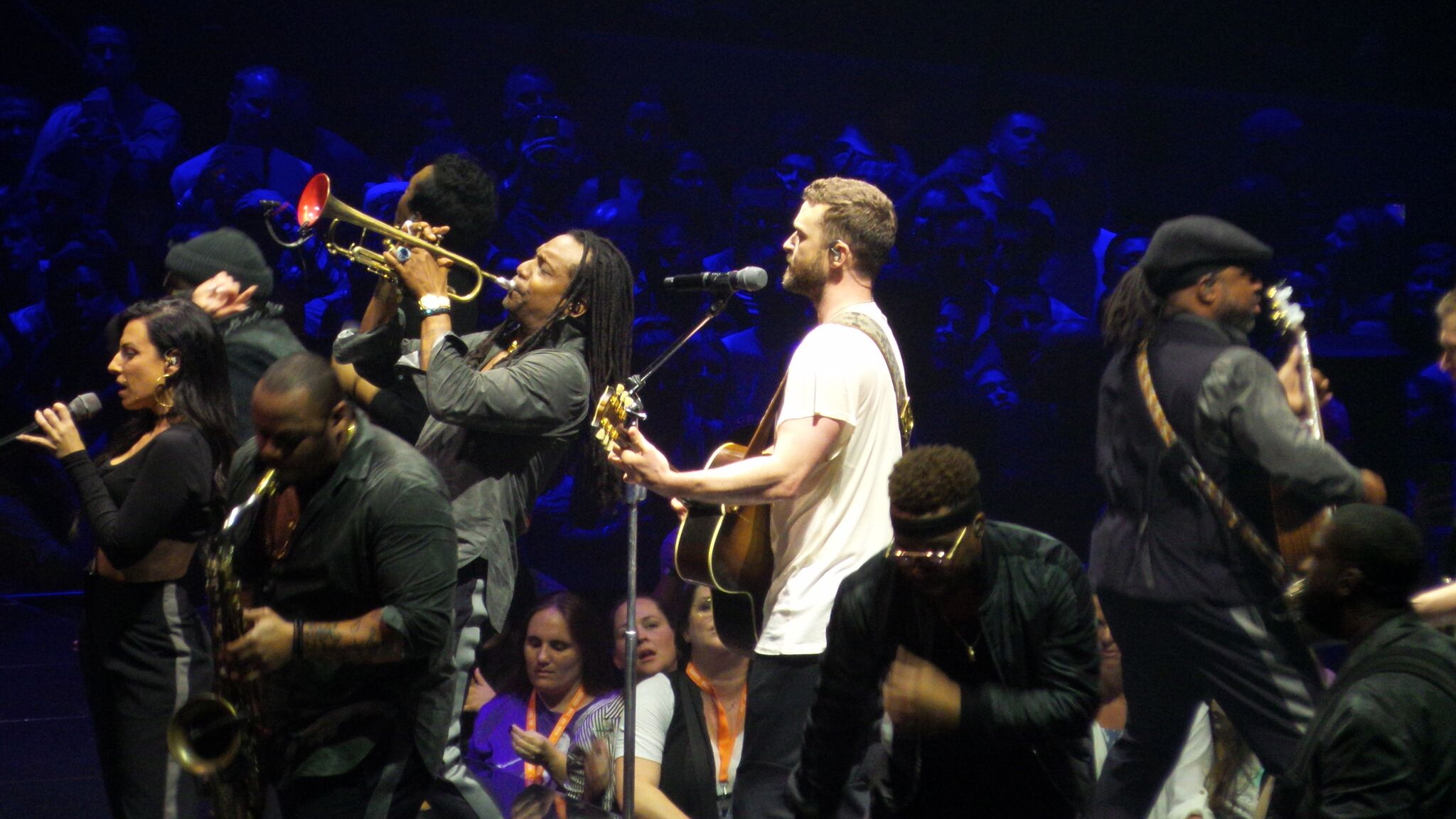
Timberlake and the Tennessee Kids performing in Miami.

The tour received generally positive reviews from critics. Toronto Star journalist Nick Krewen, who attended the opening date, gave it a score of four-out-of-four, writing "[the] stellar tour kickoff delivers the hits and the spectacle... Even with some of the most elaborate, sophisticated visual technology available at his disposal, pop superstar Justin Timberlake managed to have his campfire moment at the Air Canada Centre Tuesday night. With a literal campfire." Chicago Tribune's Bob Gendron, who attended the show at the United Center, praised the spectacle and said "Parade leader. Spurned lover. Assertive dancer. Down-on-his-knees relationship savior. Bartender who handed shots out to his large ensemble. Outdoors lover who gathered around a campfire to play familiar songs. Timberlake embraced an array of roles, blurring the lines between entertainer, singer and actor." Adam Graham of the Detroit News wrote it "was an engrossing spectacle that turned the arena into his personal wooded playland; no concert artist has come close to using Little Caesars Arena's space this creatively, save for perhaps Lady Gaga. [...] Timberlake was cool and commanding, taking the stage in a jean jacket and track pants and still looking like he owned the place." Graham also praised Timberlake's band the Tennessee Kids, "[they] became his own E Street Band — there were times, especially when the band turned around and played to the fans at the back of the arena, that the show recalled a Bruce Springsteen concert."

Alim Kheraj of GQ, after attending the concert at London's O2 Arena, described Timberlake as "one of the greatest live performers of all time." "Timberlake and the Man of the Woods Tour has its secret weapon: captivation. With more than two decades of experience in the entertainment industry, he knows how to maintain an audience's attention, how to mould them so they're pumped at his signals and (mostly) when to take his foot off the accelerator. [...] Similarly, unlike a legacy artist, his show is still exciting, carefully crafted to bring fans the best in audio-visual technology while ensuring that, musically, things line up too."

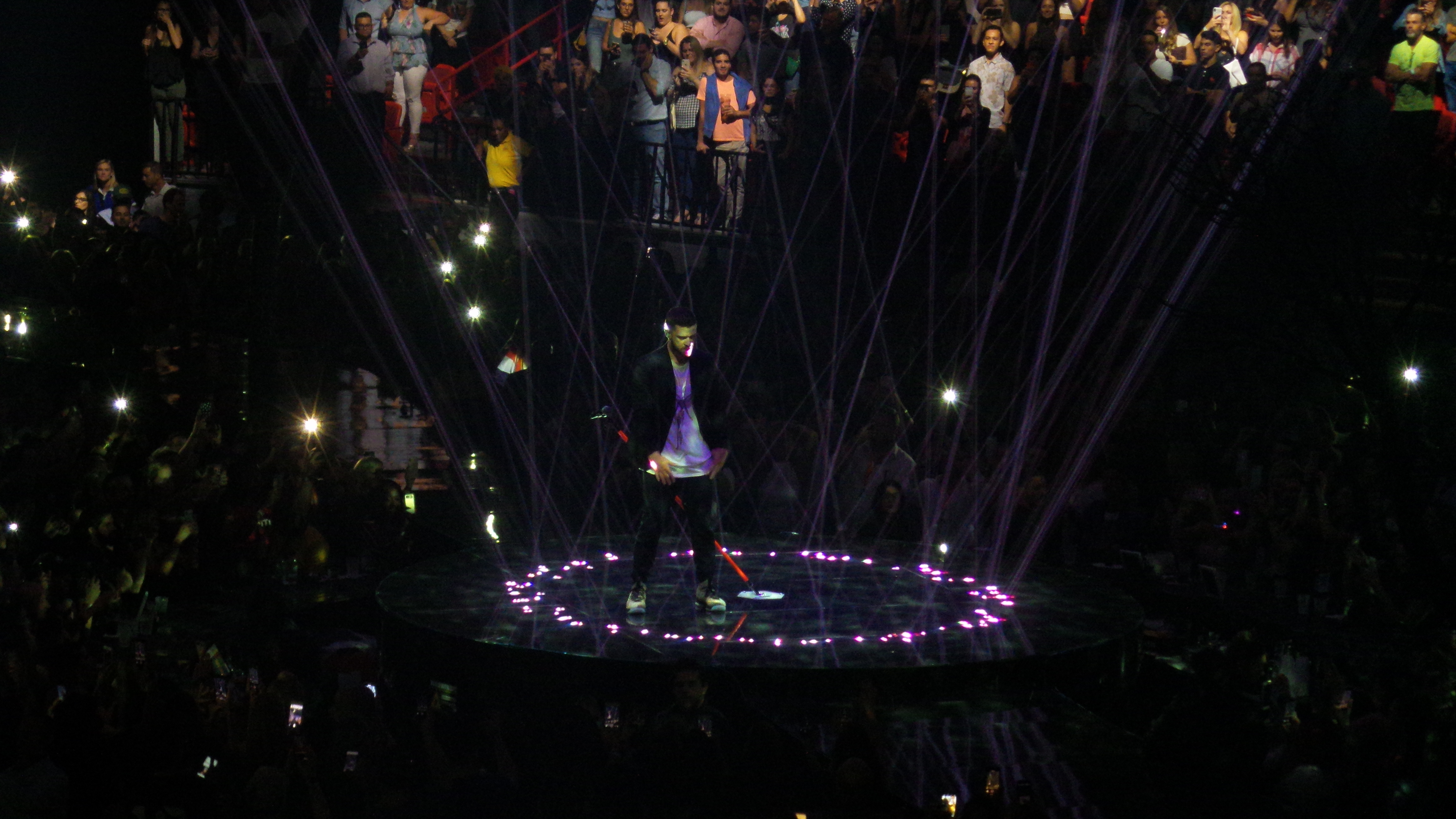
Timberlake on stage in Miami on May 18, 2018.

Franklin Soults of The Boston Globe described the first half of the show as "ritzy glamour," with the "undercut with casual outfits and attitudes that made the extravaganza feel almost relaxed, like a professional athlete's seemingly effortless performance during a career-topping late season." Despite describing the sing-along around the campfire as "clumsy," he did believe that Timberlake won the crowd back towards the end of the show. The Oakland Press' Gary Graff said "You'd be hard-pressed to find a production that makes full use of an arena in as complete a way as Timberlake is doing" and opined "the whole affair was tightly choreographed to appear precision at times, loose and improvisational at others. Timberlake and company were best when they were at their funkiest." Peter Larsen in Daily Breeze said in his review that Timberlake delivered "with swagger and style in a terrific night at the Forum," and noted the opening act The Shadowboxers "surely won over many with their energetic performance."

Jimmie Tramel of Tulsa World said Timberlake brought "cool factor" to BOK Center, and noted his "appeal is such that among those spotted walking into the arena was state senator and former University of Tulsa football coach David Rader." Ed Masley of The Arizona Republic said "there were plenty of breathtaking nature scenes projected on the scrims that dotted the arena," while "it felt more like a night at the club in downtown Phoenix than a trip to Payson," about Timberlake he commented, "he's only gotten better, as he proved repeatedly in the course of a heavily choreographed performance. His sense of showmanship has also gotten stronger through the years."

Billboard critics ranked the Man of the Woods Tour as one of the best live shows of 2018.

David Menconi of The News & Observer said "Justin Timberlake returns to the stage and proves why he's America's pop star", and noted him as "The Prince of Pop". He also said of the show that Timberlake "Sang quite well... But he danced even better, and that's what turned the crowd on most of all. How he moved was at least as important as how he sang." Chris Conde of San Antonio Current deemed it "an spectacle of undeniable talent... Even if you don't like pop music, Timberlake's show was so rich in musicianship and showmanship that anyone wanting to say something bad would be hard-pressed to, ahem, justify a negative review."

== Set list ==
The following set list is from the show on March 13, 2018, in Toronto. It is not representative of all concerts for the duration of the tour.

1. "Filthy"
2. "Midnight Summer Jam"
3. "LoveStoned"
4. "SexyBack"
5. "Man of the Woods"
6. "Higher Higher"
7. "Señorita"
8. "Suit & Tie" (contains elements of "Sho Nuff")
9. "My Love"
10. "Cry Me a River"
11. "Mirrors"
12. "Drink You Away"
13. "Flannel"
14. "Until the End of Time"
15. "Dreams" / " Ex-Factor" / "Come Together" / "Thank God I'm a Country Boy" (each sung by a backup singer)
16. "Morning Light"
17. "What Goes Around... Comes Around"
18. "Say Something"
19. "Montana"
20. "Summer Love"
21. "Rock Your Body"
22. "Supplies"
23. "Can't Stop the Feeling!"

Notes

- On May 9, 2018, during the concert in Nashville, Chris Stapleton joined Timberlake on stage to perform "Tennessee Whiskey"
- "Like I Love You" was added to the set list between "Supplies" and "Can't Stop the Feeling!", while "Flannel" was later removed.
- On January 10, 2019, in Atlanta, T.I. joined Timberlake on stage during "My Love". Moreover, he performed a medley of his songs: "What You Know" / "Bring 'Em Out" / "Live Your Life".
- "SoulMate" was performed on the European leg only.

== Tour dates ==
List of North American concerts
Date	City	Country	Venue	Opening act	Attendance	Revenue
March 13, 2018	Toronto	Canada	Air Canada Centre	Francesco Yates	32,142 / 32,142	$3,463,128
March 15, 2018	Toronto	Canada	Air Canada Centre	Francesco Yates	32,142 / 32,142	$3,463,128
March 18, 2018	Washington, D.C.	United States	Capital One Arena	The Shadowboxers	16,274 / 16,274	$2,809,918
March 22, 2018	New York City	United States	Madison Square Garden	The Shadowboxers	17,288 / 17,288	$2,867,064
March 25, 2018	Newark	United States	Prudential Center	The Shadowboxers	15,645 / 15,645	$2,390,462
March 27, 2018	Chicago	United States	United Center	The Shadowboxers	33,006 / 33,006	$5,304,255
March 28, 2018	Chicago	United States	United Center	The Shadowboxers	33,006 / 33,006	$5,304,255
March 31, 2018	Cleveland	United States	Quicken Loans Arena	The Shadowboxers	18,237 / 18,237	$2,504,220
April 2, 2018	Detroit	United States	Little Caesars Arena	The Shadowboxers	17,131 / 17,131	$2,246,777
April 4, 2018	Boston	United States	TD Garden	The Shadowboxers	30,976 / 30,976	$4,604,928
April 5, 2018	Boston	United States	TD Garden	The Shadowboxers	30,976 / 30,976	$4,604,928
April 8, 2018	Montreal	Canada	Bell Centre	Francesco Yates	29,726 / 29,726	$3,200,799
April 9, 2018	Montreal	Canada	Bell Centre	Francesco Yates	29,726 / 29,726	$3,200,799
April 12, 2018	Salt Lake City	United States	Vivint Smart Home Arena	The Shadowboxers	14,862 / 14,862	$2,098,916
April 14, 2018	Las Vegas	United States	T-Mobile Arena	The Shadowboxers	30,493 / 30,493	$5,113,319
April 15, 2018	Las Vegas	United States	T-Mobile Arena	The Shadowboxers	30,493 / 30,493	$5,113,319
April 24, 2018	San Jose	United States	SAP Center	The Shadowboxers	31,221 / 31,221	$4,385,706
April 25, 2018	San Jose	United States	SAP Center	The Shadowboxers	31,221 / 31,221	$4,385,706
April 28, 2018	Inglewood	United States	The Forum	The Shadowboxers	33,242 / 33,242	$4,901,470
April 29, 2018	Inglewood	United States	The Forum	The Shadowboxers	33,242 / 33,242	$4,901,470
May 2, 2018	Phoenix	United States	Talking Stick Resort Arena	The Shadowboxers	16,288 / 16,288	$2,319,640
May 5, 2018	Tulsa	United States	BOK Center	The Shadowboxers	17,162 / 17,162	$2,464,710
May 7, 2018	Columbus	United States	Nationwide Arena	The Shadowboxers	17,687 / 17,687	$2,579,208
May 9, 2018	Nashville	United States	Bridgestone Arena	The Shadowboxers	16,055 / 16,055	$2,551,016
May 11, 2018	Duluth	United States	Infinite Energy Arena	The Shadowboxers	12,149 / 12,149	$2,194,486
May 14, 2018	Orlando	United States	Amway Center	The Shadowboxers	16,208 / 16,208	$2,387,113
May 15, 2018	Tampa	United States	Amalie Arena	The Shadowboxers	—	
May 18, 2018	Miami	United States	American Airlines Arena	The Shadowboxers	15,126 / 15,126	$2,113,415
May 19, 2018	Sunrise	United States	BB&T Center	The Shadowboxers	16,369 / 16,369	$2,361,871
May 23, 2018	Houston	United States	Toyota Center	The Shadowboxers	29,926 / 29,926	$4,452,950
May 25, 2018	Houston	United States	Toyota Center	The Shadowboxers	29,926 / 29,926	$4,452,950
May 27, 2018	Dallas	United States	American Airlines Center	The Shadowboxers	33,482 / 33,482	$4,898,488
May 28, 2018	Dallas	United States	American Airlines Center	The Shadowboxers	33,482 / 33,482	$4,898,488
May 30, 2018	Memphis	United States	FedExForum	The Shadowboxers	14,594 / 14,594	$2,148,372
June 1, 2018	Pittsburgh	United States	PPG Paints Arena	The Shadowboxers	17,074 / 17,074	$2,340,659
June 2, 2018	Philadelphia	United States	Wells Fargo Center	The Shadowboxers	17,303 / 17,303	$2,668,122

List of European concerts
Date	City	Country	Venue	Opening act	Attendance	Revenue
July 3, 2018 (Note: The show on July 3, 2018 was originally scheduled to take place on June 22, 2018, but was postponed due to delays.)	Paris	France	AccorHotels Arena	The Shadowboxers	26,047 / 26,047	$2,110,303
July 4, 2018 (Note: The show on July 4, 2018 was originally scheduled to take place on June 23, 2018, but was postponed due to delays.)	Paris	France	AccorHotels Arena	The Shadowboxers	26,047 / 26,047	$2,110,303
July 7, 2018 (Note: The show on July 7, 2018 was originally scheduled to take place on July 5, 2018, but was postponed due to delays.)	Glasgow	Scotland	SSE Hydro	The Shadowboxers	7,686 / 10,232	$853,601
July 9, 2018	London	England	The O_{2} Arena	The Shadowboxers	32,312 / 35,322	$3,991,280
July 11, 2018	London	England	The O_{2} Arena	The Shadowboxers	32,312 / 35,322	$3,991,280
July 13, 2018	Mannheim	Germany	SAP Arena	The Shadowboxers	10,476 / 10,476	$1,030,776
July 15, 2018	Amsterdam	Netherlands	Ziggo Dome	The Shadowboxers	15,064 / 15,064	$1,724,273
July 17, 2018	Antwerp	Belgium	Sportpaleis	The Shadowboxers	34,819 / 34,819	$3,191,467
July 18, 2018	Antwerp	Belgium	Sportpaleis	The Shadowboxers	34,819 / 34,819	$3,191,467
July 21, 2018	Cologne	Germany	Lanxess Arena	The Shadowboxers	30,638 / 30,638	$3,333,404
July 22, 2018	Cologne	Germany	Lanxess Arena	The Shadowboxers	30,638 / 30,638	$3,333,404
July 31, 2018	Stockholm	Sweden	Friends Arena	The Shadowboxers	23,303 / 23,303	$1,818,015
August 2, 2018	Oslo	Norway	Telenor Arena	The Shadowboxers	15,409 / 15,409	$1,235,128
August 4, 2018	Copenhagen	Denmark	Royal Arena	The Shadowboxers	26,234 / 26,234	$3,307,944
August 5, 2018	Copenhagen	Denmark	Royal Arena	The Shadowboxers	26,234 / 26,234	$3,307,944
August 8, 2018	Hamburg	Germany	Barclaycard Arena	The Shadowboxers	23,654 / 23,654	$2,424,597
August 9, 2018	Hamburg	Germany	Barclaycard Arena	The Shadowboxers	23,654 / 23,654	$2,424,597
August 12, 2018	Berlin	Germany	Mercedes-Benz Arena	Bazzi	27,022 / 27,022	$2,761,779
August 13, 2018	Berlin	Germany	Mercedes-Benz Arena	Bazzi	27,022 / 27,022	$2,761,779
August 16, 2018	Zürich	Switzerland	Hallenstadion	Bazzi	12,380 / 12,380	$1,622,406
August 18, 2018	Vienna	Austria	Wiener Stadthalle	Bazzi	13,363 / 13,363	$1,486,731
August 20, 2018	Frankfurt	Germany	Festhalle	Bazzi	22,226 / 22,226	$2,407,113
August 21, 2018	Frankfurt	Germany	Festhalle	Bazzi	22,226 / 22,226	$2,407,113
August 24, 2018	Arnhem	Netherlands	GelreDome	Bazzi	34,497 / 34,497	$3,395,152
August 25, 2018	Amsterdam	Netherlands	Ziggo Dome	Bazzi	15,658 / 15,658	$1,711,716
August 27, 2018 (Note: The show on August 27, 2018 was originally scheduled to take place on June 27, 2018, but was postponed due to delays.)	Birmingham	England	Arena Birmingham	Bazzi	11,383 / 11,383	$965,879
August 29, 2018 (Note: The show on August 29, 2018 was originally scheduled to take place on July 1, 2018, but was postponed due to delays.)	Manchester	England	Manchester Arena	Bazzi	13,859 / 13,859	$1,281,565

List of North American concerts
Date	City	Country	Venue	Opening act	Attendance	Revenue
September 19, 2018	Lexington	United States	Rupp Arena	Francesco Yates	17,342 / 17,342	$2,017,287
September 21, 2018	Milwaukee	United States	Fiserv Forum	Francesco Yates	16,060 / 16,060	$2,301,988
September 25, 2018	Pittsburgh	United States	PPG Paints Arena	Unknown		
September 28, 2018	Saint Paul	United States	Xcel Energy Center	Francesco Yates	33,587 / 33,587	$4,342,300
September 29, 2018	Saint Paul	United States	Xcel Energy Center	Francesco Yates	33,587 / 33,587	$4,342,300
October 2, 2018	Cleveland	United States	Quicken Loans Arena	Francesco Yates	16,574 / 16,574	$2,109,296
October 5, 2018	Chicago	United States	United Center	Francesco Yates	17,924 / 17,924	$2,612,545
October 9, 2018	Toronto	Canada	Scotiabank Arena	Francesco Yates	16,511 / 16,511	$1,926,346
October 11, 2018 (Note: The show on October 11, 2018 was originally scheduled to take place on October 22, 2018, but was rescheduled to accommodate the rescheduled March 21, 2018 show at Madison Square Garden.)	Ottawa	Canada	Canadian Tire Centre	Unknown		
October 13, 2018	Quebec City	Canada	Videotron Centre	Unknown		
October 15, 2018	University Park	United States	Bryce Jordan Center	Unknown		
October 18, 2018	Boston	United States	TD Garden	Unknown		
October 20, 2018	Albany	United States	Times Union Center	Unknown		
October 22, 2018 (Note: The show on October 22, 2018 was originally scheduled to take place on March 21, 2018, but was postponed due to severe weather conditions.)	New York City	United States	Madison Square Garden	Francesco Yates	17,690 / 17,690	$2,832,189
January 4, 2019	Washington, D.C.	United States	Capital One Arena	Francesco Yates	16,621 / 16,621	$2,512,845
January 6, 2019	Raleigh	United States	PNC Arena	Francesco Yates	18,445 / 18,445	$2,341,847
January 8, 2019	Charlotte	United States	Spectrum Center	Francesco Yates	17,227 / 17,227	$2,518,530
January 10, 2019	Atlanta	United States	State Farm Arena	Francesco Yates	14,567 / 14,567	$2,211,727
January 12, 2019	Memphis	United States	FedExForum	Francesco Yates	15,027 / 15,027	$1,952,479
January 15, 2019	New Orleans	United States	Smoothie King Center	Francesco Yates; Choppa	16,331 / 16,331	$2,345,203
January 17, 2019	North Little Rock	United States	Verizon Arena	Francesco Yates	16,988 / 16,988	$2,090,304
January 19, 2019	San Antonio	United States	AT&T Center	Francesco Yates	16,151 / 16,151	$2,426,931
January 22, 2019	Houston	United States	Toyota Center	Francesco Yates	10,358 / 10,358	$1,322,979
January 24, 2019	Dallas	United States	American Airlines Center	Francesco Yates	15,967 / 15,967	$2,264,972
January 26, 2019	Oklahoma City	United States	Chesapeake Energy Arena	Francesco Yates	16,810 / 16,810	$2,200,055
January 28, 2019 (Note: The show on January 28, 2019 was originally scheduled to take place on January 29, 2019, but was moved up by one day due to Timberlake suffering from damaged vocal cords.)	Denver	United States	Pepsi Center	Francesco Yates	17,440 / 17,440	$2,842,221
January 31, 2019 (Note: The show on January 31, 2019 was originally scheduled to take place on October 24, 2018, but was postponed due to Timberlake suffering from bruised vocal cords.)	New York City	United States	Madison Square Garden	—	18,522 / 18,522	$2,774,525
February 4, 2019	Winnipeg	Canada	Bell MTS Place	—	11,959 / 11,959	$1,064,971
February 6, 2019 (Note: The show on February 6, 2019 was originally scheduled to take place on November 4, 2018, but was postponed due to Timberlake suffering from bruised vocal cords.)	Edmonton	Canada	Rogers Place	Francesco Yates	24,929 / 24,929	$2,210,685
February 7, 2019 (Note: The show on February 7, 2019 was originally scheduled to take place on November 5, 2018, but was postponed due to Timberlake suffering from bruised vocal cords.)	Edmonton	Canada	Rogers Place	Francesco Yates	24,929 / 24,929	$2,210,685
February 14, 2019 (Note: The show on February 14, 2019 was originally scheduled to take place on November 8, 2018, but was postponed due to Timberlake suffering from bruised vocal cords.)	Vancouver	Canada	Rogers Arena	Francesco Yates	29,787 / 29,787	$2,786,815
February 15, 2019 (Note: The show on February 15, 2019 was originally scheduled to take place on November 9, 2018, but was postponed due to Timberlake suffering from bruised vocal cords.)	Vancouver	Canada	Rogers Arena	Francesco Yates	29,787 / 29,787	$2,786,815
February 18, 2019 (Note: The show on February 18, 2019 was originally scheduled to take place on November 16, 2018, but was postponed due to Timberlake suffering from bruised vocal cords.)	Portland	United States	Moda Center	—	17,256 / 17,256	$2,428,095
February 21, 2019	San Diego	United States	Pechanga Arena	—	12,259 / 12,259	$1,717,132
February 22, 2019 (Note: The show on February 22, 2019 was originally scheduled to take place on November 20, 2018, but was postponed due to Timberlake suffering from bruised vocal cords.)	Anaheim	United States	Honda Center	—	15,164 / 15,164	$2,245,075
February 24, 2019 (Note: The show on February 24, 2019 was originally scheduled to take place on November 18, 2018, but was postponed due to Timberlake suffering from bruised vocal cords.)	Sacramento	United States	Golden 1 Center	—	15,934 / 15,934	$2,244,027
March 5, 2019 (Note: The show on March 5, 2019 was originally scheduled to take place on November 29, 2018, but was postponed due to Timberlake suffering from bruised vocal cords.)	Phoenix	United States	Talking Stick Resort Arena	—	15,917 / 15,917	$2,073,423
March 8, 2019 (Note: The show on March 8, 2019 was originally scheduled to take place on December 1, 2018, but was postponed due to Timberlake suffering from bruised vocal cords.)	Las Vegas	United States	T-Mobile Arena	—	15,466 / 15,466	$1,926,041
March 10, 2019 (Note: The show on March 10, 2019 was originally scheduled to take place on November 27, 2018, but was postponed due to Timberlake suffering from bruised vocal cords.)	Los Angeles	United States	Staples Center	—	16,285 / 16,285	$2,586,872
March 13, 2019 (Note: The show on March 13, 2019 was originally scheduled to take place on December 3, 2018, but was postponed due to Timberlake suffering from bruised vocal cords.)	Fresno	United States	Save Mart Center	—	11,745 / 11,745	$1,587,736
March 15, 2019 (Note: The show on March 15, 2019 was originally scheduled to take place on December 5, 2018, but was postponed due to Timberlake suffering from bruised vocal cords.)	Oakland	United States	Oracle Arena	—	14,436 / 14,436	$1,742,193
March 21, 2019 (Note: The show on March 21, 2019 was originally scheduled to take place on December 10, 2018, but was postponed due to Timberlake suffering from bruised vocal cords.)	Kansas City	United States	Sprint Center	—	17,528 / 17,528	$2,612,406
March 23, 2019 (Note: The show on March 23, 2019 was originally scheduled to take place on December 8, 2018, but was postponed due to Timberlake suffering from bruised vocal cords.)	Omaha	United States	CHI Health Center Omaha	—	16,676 / 16,676	$2,460,764
March 25, 2019	Detroit	United States	Little Caesars Arena	—	13,092 / 13,092	$1,478,347
March 28, 2019 (Note: The show on March 28, 2019 was originally scheduled to take place on December 13, 2018, but was postponed due to Timberlake suffering from bruised vocal cords.)	St. Louis	United States	Enterprise Center	—	17,351 / 17,351	$2,425,805
March 31, 2019	Columbus	United States	Nationwide Arena	—	15,430 / 15,430	$1,743,696
April 2, 2019 (Note: The show on April 2, 2019 was originally scheduled to take place on December 14, 2018, but was postponed due to Timberlake suffering from bruised vocal cords.)	Indianapolis	United States	Bankers Life Fieldhouse	—	14,255 / 14,255	$2,060,658
April 4, 2019	Grand Rapids	United States	Van Andel Arena	—	11,054 / 11,054	$1,689,672
April 6, 2019 (Note: The show on April 6, 2019 was originally scheduled to take place on October 28, 2018, and then December 19, 2018, but was postponed due to Timberlake suffering from bruised vocal cords.)	Buffalo	United States	KeyBank Center	—	17,544 / 17,544	$2,272,579
April 9, 2019 (Note: The show on April 9, 2019, was originally scheduled to take place on December 17, 2018, but was postponed due to Timberlake suffering from bruised vocal cords.)	Philadelphia	United States	Wells Fargo Center	—	16,125 / 16,125	$1,996,116
April 12, 2019 (Note: The show on April 12, 2019, was originally scheduled to take place on December 21, 2018, but was postponed due to Timberlake suffering from bruised vocal cords.)	Uncasville	United States	Mohegan Sun Arena	—	16,403 / 16,403	$2,360,953
April 13, 2019 (Note: The show on April 13, 2019, was originally scheduled to take place on December 22, 2018, but was postponed due to Timberlake suffering from bruised vocal cords.)	Uncasville	United States	Mohegan Sun Arena	—	16,403 / 16,403	$2,360,953

List of cancelled concerts
Date	City	Country	Venue	Reason
June 25, 2018	Paris	France	AccorHotels Arena	Scheduling conflicts
June 28, 2018	Birmingham	England	Arena Birmingham	Delays
July 2, 2018	Manchester	England	Manchester Arena	Delays
July 6, 2018	Glasgow	Scotland	SSE Hydro	Delays
February 10, 2019	Tacoma	United States	Tacoma Dome	Severe weather conditions
February 11, 2019	Tacoma	United States	Tacoma Dome	Severe weather conditions
