= Say Something (Justin Timberlake song) =

2018 single by Justin Timberlake featuring Chris Stapleton

Single by Justin Timberlake featuring Chris Stapleton

from the album Man of the Woods
- Released: January 25, 2018
- Genre: Country pop; country rock
- Length: 4:39
- Label: RCA
- Songwriters: Larrance Dopson; Floyd Hills; Timothy Mosley; Christopher Stapleton; Justin Timberlake
- Producers: Justin Timberlake; Timbaland; Danja

Justin Timberlake singles chronology
| "Supplies" (2018) | "Say Something" (2018) | "SoulMate" (2018) |

Chris Stapleton singles chronology
| "Broken Halos" (2017) | "Say Something" (2018) | "Millionaire" (2018) |

Music video
- "Say Something" on YouTube

"Say Something" is a song recorded by American singer Justin Timberlake featuring fellow American singer Chris Stapleton for the former's fifth studio album, Man of the Woods (2018). RCA Records released the song for digital download and streaming on January 25, 2018, as the album's third single. Timberlake wrote and produced the song alongside Timbaland and Danja, with Stapleton and Larrance Dopson providing additional songwriting. It was also recorded at Conway Recording Studios, based in Hollywood, Los Angeles. The song is a country pop and country rock tune about reflection and regret, meditating on social pressure to have something to say, and being unsure if you really do.

"Say Something" debuted at number 9 on the US Billboard Hot 100, becoming Timberlake's 19th Top 10 single as a solo artist and Stapleton's first. It also reached number 1 in Slovakia and Slovenia and the Top 10 in Austria, Belgium, Canada, Czech Republic, Germany, Hungary, the Netherlands, Poland, Scotland, Switzerland, and the United Kingdom. It was serviced to contemporary hit radio on February 13, 2018. A live version of the song was released on March 31. "Say Something" received a nomination for Best Pop Duo/Group Performance at the 61st Annual Grammy Awards.

== Background and composition ==
Justin Timberlake and Chris Stapleton first collaborated at the 2015 Country Music Association Awards, performing "Tennessee Whiskey" and "Drink You Away". Stapleton was initially only writing songs with Timberlake for the album, before being asked to sing on "Say Something". He told Billboard, "I really just went out to Los Angeles to write songs with him, it's a very fluid process with him, there's a lot going on. That was one of those things where there wasn't necessarily a plan. He was like 'All right, you hop in there and take a verse,' and I'm like, 'You want me to do what?' ... It came out great. I had a blast with him, he's a great creative force and one of those guys that if you get a chance to work with him, you should".

"Say Something" is an upbeat country pop and country rock ballad that blends the electronic structures of Man of the Woods previously released songs "Filthy" and "Supplies" with Stapleton's country blues style. The song comprises elements of gospel, pop, acoustic soul and jazz. Timberlake and Timbaland previously incorporated country sounds such as twangy guitars on tracks like "What Goes Around... Comes Around". The song features lyrics about reflection and regret, meditating on social pressure to have something to say and being unsure if you really do. Nashville Scene writer Stephen Trageser interpreted the lyrics as "...recognizing that someone with the degree of celebrity Timberlake has can do more good by taking up less space. As in, realizing that weighing in on issues of public concern can easily turn into an event focused on him and his image instead of actually serving the cause at hand".

== Critical reception ==
Lauren Tingle of CMT gave the song a positive review, writing, "It definitely sounds like it could have been born in Timberlake's musically rich home state of Tennessee. The pop singer's high tenor and Stapleton's gravelly melisma accent the song's driving acoustic rhythm guitars, horns and syncopated percussion". In Billboard, Natalie Maher stated the climax of the song occurs "as the two are joined by a full choir, and added band, and then slowly comes down off itself with the line, 'maybe it's greatest to say nothing.'" Stephen Trageser of Nashville Scene deemed the track "an anthemic tune about something ostensibly honorable," and went on to interpret the lyrics. Cillea Houghton of Taste of Country called the song a "jam" where the singer "trade lines on an upbeat, genre-less track that could easily nestle into country radio". Emily Yahr of The Washington Post said the song "has a guitar-driven sound that could theoretically fit into the modern country world". Billboard's critics ranked it among the best songs of the first half of 2018.

Uproxx's Aaron Williams opined the blend of styles created "a surprisingly danceable groove that isn't too far off from Timberlake's usual comfort zone," and added, "their voices also blend well". Will Lavin of Joe expressed that "Say Something" is a "more refined Justin Timberlake. It feels like an organic blend of musical elements. From the hip hop-inspired drums, to the country-driven guitar riff, gospel harmonies, and triumphant introspective vocals, you're left feeling satisfied... this is JT at his best and most honest". Forrest Wickman of Slate said the "long-anticipated duet lives up to the hype". HotNewHipHop said it is different from his previous singles as it leans towards folk music, "but it's still another solid offering from Timberlake". MTV News's Madeline Roth said the song is "as close to Timberlake's Memphis roots as he's gotten so far... and it's a promising sign of things to come," while MTV UK's Sam Prance stated Timberlake "deliver some of the best vocals of his career to date. Not to mention, the chorus is massive and Chris complements Justin perfectly on it".

Pitchfork's Marc Hogan, in an unfavorable review, said: "apparently, the two have nothing to say, and they're absurdly proud of it". Spin's Winston Cook-Wilson felt it is not the single for a listener that is "looking for clever, poignant, or just remotely sensical turns of phrase". Entertainment Weekly named "Say Something" the ninth best song of 2018 on their year-end list. Billboard critics ranked it as the 74th best song of the year.

== Release and commercial performance ==
RCA Records released "Say Something" for digital download and streaming on January 25, 2018, as the third single from Man of the Woods. The song was also issued to contemporary hit radio stations in the United States, Italy, and Russia on February 13, February 16, and March 26, respectively. A live version of the song was released for digital download on March 31.

In North America, "Say Something" peaked at number 9 on the US Billboard Hot 100. On airplay charts, it peaked at number 16 on Adult Contemporary, number eight on Adult Pop Airplay, number 30 on Dance Airplay, and number 15 on Pop Airplay. It was certified triple platinum by the Recording Industry Association of America (RIAA) and sold 431,000 downloads in the country by June 2018. The song peaked at number 6 on the Canadian Hot 100. On airplay charts, it peaked at number 6 on Canada AC, number 13 on Canada CHR/Top 40, and number 4 on Canada Hot AC. It was certified double platinum by Music Canada. "Filthy" peaked at number 9 on Mexico Ingles Airplay. In South America, it peaked at number 11 in Argentina and number 56 in Brazil; it was certified diamond by Pro-Música Brasil (PMB).

In Europe, "Say Something" peaked at number 3 on the Billboard Euro Digital Song Sales chart. Elsewhere, it peaked at number 9 in Austria, numbers 5 and 4 in the Flanders and Wallonia regions of Belgium, number 11 in the Commonwealth of Independent States, number 11 in the Czech Republic, number 11 in Denmark, number 69 in France, number 9 in Germany, numbers 27 in Hungary, number 16 in Ireland, number 42 in Italy, numbers 7 and 24 in the Netherlands, number 39 in Norway, number 8 in Poland, number 23 in Portugal, number 13 in Russia, number 2 on the Scottish Singles Chart, number 1 in Slovakia, number 1 in Slovenia, number 28 in Sweden, number 6 in Switzerland, number 9 on the UK Singles Chart, and number 56 in Ukraine. It was certified double platinum by the Polish Society of the Phonographic Industry (ZPAV), platinum by IFPI Danmark, Syndicat National de l'Édition Phonographique (SNEP), the Federazione Industria Musicale Italiana (FIMI), IFPI Switzerland, and the British Phonographic Industry (BPI), and gold by the Belgian Recorded Music Association (BRMA) and the Bundesverband Musikindustrie (BVMI).

In Oceania, "Say Something" peaked at number 18 in Australia and number 20 in New Zealand. It was certified double platinum by the Australian Recording Industry Association (ARIA) and Recorded Music NZ (RMNZ).

== Music video ==
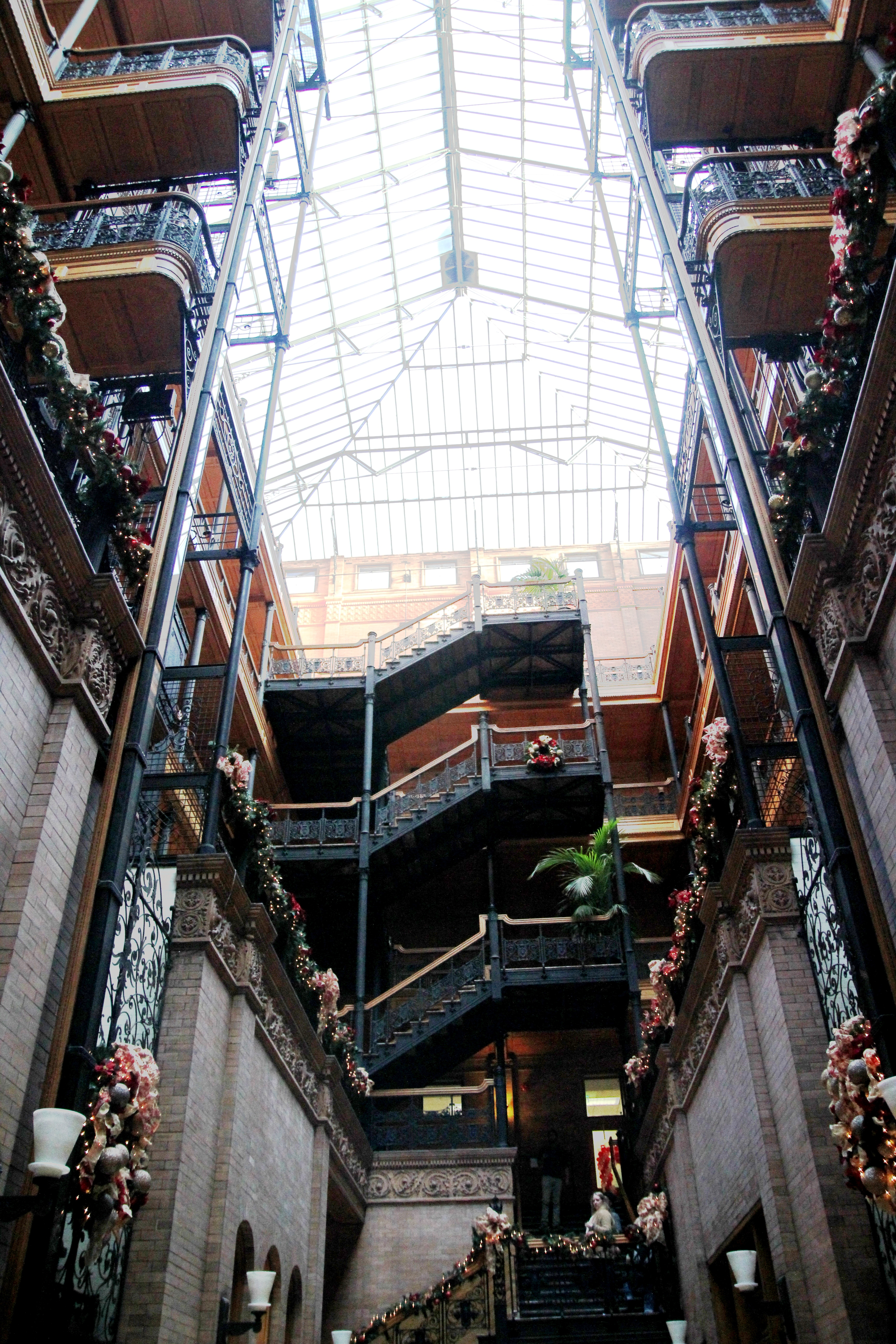
Staircases and atrium interior of the Bradbury Building.

Directed by Arturo Perez Jr. and produced by La Blogothèque, the video was filmed using a technique known as "continuous motion" and shot in one take at the Bradbury Building in Los Angeles – famous for its appearance in the 1982 science fiction film Blade Runner – with elevators, balconies, and stairs that "personified the labyrinth" the concept required. The crew included 17 musicians and a 60-person choir, to record the video and audio live in only one take. The video starts with Timberlake alone in a room creating beats and effects on a Maschine sampler. The camera follows him as he straps on an acoustic guitar and ascends an elevator. Stepping out, he encounters Stapleton on a nearby staircase.

It won Best Live Video at the 2018 UK Music Video Awards. It received nominations for Video of the Year and Collaborative Video of the Year at the 2018 CMT Music Awards, for an MTV Video Music Award for Best Direction, and for an iHeartRadio Much Music Video Award for Best Director. It also received a nomination for Best Music Video at the 2018 Camerimage Festival.

== Live performances ==
On February 5, 2018, Timberlake and Stapleton performed "Say Something" on the post-Super Bowl episode of The Tonight Show Starring Jimmy Fallon. On February 21, 2018, both artists performed the song at the 2018 Brit Awards. "Say Something" has also been performed at every show on Timberlake's sixth concert tour, The Man of the Woods Tour (2018–2019), as well as Timberlake's seventh concert tour, The Forget Tomorrow World Tour (2024–2025).

== Accolades ==
Awards and nominations for "Say Something"
| Organization | Year | Category | Result | Ref. |
|---|---|---|---|---|
| CMT Music Awards | 2018 | Video of the Year | Nominated | |
| CMT Music Awards | 2018 | Collaboration of the Year | Nominated | |
| MTV Video Music Awards | 2018 | Best Direction | Nominated | |
| Teen Choice Awards | 2018 | Choice Song: Male Artist | Nominated | |
| UK Music Video Awards | 2018 | Best Live Video | Won | |
| Grammy Awards | 2019 | Best Pop Duo/Group Performance | Nominated | |
| iHeartRadio Music Awards | 2019 | Song of the Year | Nominated | |

== Track listing ==
Digital download
| No. | Title | Length |
|---|---|---|
| 1. | "Say Something" (featuring Chris Stapleton) | 4:38 |

Digital download
| No. | Title | Length |
|---|---|---|
| 1. | "Say Something" (live version) (featuring Chris Stapleton) | 4:02 |

== Credits and personnel ==
Credits are adapted from the liner notes of Man of the Woods.

- Justin Timberlake – production, vocal production, guitar
- Timbaland – production
- Danja – production
- Larrance Dopson – additional production
- Chris Stapleton – featured vocals, guitar
- Chris Godbey – engineer
- Ben Sedano – assistant engineering
- Elliot Ives – guitar

== Charts ==
=== Weekly charts ===
Weekly chart performance for "Say Something"
| Chart (2018) | Peak position |
|---|---|
| Argentina Anglo (Monitor Latino) | 11 |
| Australia (ARIA) | 18 |
| Austria (Ö3 Austria Top 40) | 9 |
| Belgium (Ultratop 50 Flanders) | 5 |
| Belgium (Ultratop 50 Wallonia) | 4 |
| Brazil (Top 100 Brasil) | 56 |
| Canada Hot 100 (Billboard) | 6 |
| Canada AC (Billboard) | 6 |
| Canada CHR/Top 40 (Billboard) | 13 |
| Canada Hot AC (Billboard) | 4 |
| CIS Airplay (TopHit) | 11 |
| Czech Republic Airplay (ČNS IFPI) | 2 |
| Czech Republic Singles Digital (ČNS IFPI) | 11 |
| Denmark (Tracklisten) | 11 |
| Euro Digital Song Sales (Billboard) | 3 |
| France (SNEP) | 69 |
| Germany (GfK) | 9 |
| Hungary (Rádiós Top 40) | 27 |
| Hungary (Single Top 40) | 7 |
| Hungary (Stream Top 40) | 14 |
| Ireland (IRMA) | 16 |
| Italy (FIMI) | 42 |
| Mexico Ingles Airplay (Billboard) | 9 |
| Netherlands (Dutch Top 40) | 7 |
| Netherlands (Single Top 100) | 24 |
| New Zealand (Recorded Music NZ) | 20 |
| Norway (VG-lista) | 39 |
| Poland Airplay (ZPAV) | 8 |
| Portugal (AFP) | 23 |
| Russia Airplay (TopHit) | 13 |
| Scottish Singles Sales (Official Charts) | 2 |
| Slovakia Airplay (ČNS IFPI) | 1 |
| Slovakia Singles Digital (ČNS IFPI) | 17 |
| Slovenia (SloTop50) | 1 |
| Sweden (Sverigetopplistan) | 28 |
| Switzerland (Schweizer Hitparade) | 6 |
| UK Singles (Official Charts) | 9 |
| Ukraine Airplay (TopHit) | 56 |
| US Billboard Hot 100 | 9 |
| US Adult Contemporary (Billboard) | 16 |
| US Adult Pop Airplay (Billboard) | 8 |
| US Dance Airplay (Billboard) | 30 |
| US Pop Airplay (Billboard) | 15 |

=== Year-end charts ===
Year-end chart performance for "Say Something"
| Chart (2018) | Position |
|---|---|
| Australia (ARIA) | 68 |
| Austria (Ö3 Austria Top 40) | 51 |
| Belgium (Ultratop Flanders) | 22 |
| Belgium (Ultratop Wallonia) | 43 |
| Canada (Canadian Hot 100) | 46 |
| Denmark (Tracklisten) | 39 |
| France (SNEP) | 192 |
| Germany (Official German Charts) | 39 |
| Hungary (Rádiós Top 40) | 62 |
| Hungary (Single Top 40) | 61 |
| Iceland (Plötutíóindi) | 11 |
| Netherlands (Dutch Top 40) | 30 |
| Netherlands (Single Top 100) | 87 |
| Slovenia (SloTop50) | 16 |
| Switzerland (Schweizer Hitparade) | 27 |
| UK Singles (OCC) | 59 |
| US Billboard Hot 100 | 85 |
| US Adult Contemporary (Billboard) | 38 |
| US Adult Top 40 (Billboard) | 33 |

== Certifications ==
Certifications and sales for "Say Something"
| Region | Certification | Certified units/sales |
|---|---|---|
| Australia (ARIA) | 2× Platinum | 140,000^{‡} |
| Belgium (BRMA) | Gold | 10,000^{‡} |
| Brazil (Pro-Música Brasil) | Diamond | 160,000^{‡} |
| Canada (Music Canada) | 2× Platinum | 160,000^{‡} |
| Denmark (IFPI Danmark) | Platinum | 90,000^{‡} |
| France (SNEP) | Platinum | 200,000^{‡} |
| Germany (BVMI) | Gold | 200,000^{‡} |
| Italy (FIMI) | Platinum | 50,000^{‡} |
| New Zealand (RMNZ) | 2× Platinum | 60,000^{‡} |
| Poland (ZPAV) | 2× Platinum | 40,000^{‡} |
| Switzerland (IFPI Switzerland) | Platinum | 20,000^{‡} |
| United Kingdom (BPI) | Platinum | 600,000^{‡} |
| United States (RIAA) | 3× Platinum | 3,000,000^{‡} |
^{‡} Sales+streaming figures based on certification alone.

== Release history ==
Release dates and formats for "Say Something"
| Region | Date | Format | Version | Label | Ref. |
|---|---|---|---|---|---|
| Various | January 25, 2018 | Digital download; streaming | Original | RCA | |
| United States | February 13, 2018 | Contemporary hit radio | Original | RCA | |
| Italy | February 16, 2018 | Contemporary hit radio | Original | Sony | |
| Russia | March 26, 2018 | Contemporary hit radio | Original | Sony | |
| Various | March 31, 2018 | Digital download | Live | RCA | |
