= Man of the Woods =

2018 studio album by Justin Timberlake

Studio album by Justin Timberlake
- Released: February 2, 2018
- Recorded: 2016–2017
- Studios: Conway, Los Angeles; EastWest, Los Angeles; Jungle City, New York City; Red Bull, São Paulo
- Genres: R&B; pop; electronic; funk; soul; Americana
- Length: 65:54
- Label: RCA
- Producers: Justin Timberlake; Danja; Larrance Dopson; Jerome "J-Roc" Harmon; Eric Hudson; Elliott Ives; Rob Knox; The Neptunes; Timbaland

Justin Timberlake chronology
The 20/20 Experience – The Complete Experience (2013)	Man of the Woods (2018)	Everything I Thought It Was (2024)

Singles from Man of the Woods
- 1. "Filthy" Released: January 5, 2018; 2. "Supplies" Released: January 18, 2018; 3. "Say Something" Released: January 25, 2018

Man of the Woods is the fifth studio album by American singer Justin Timberlake. It was released on February 2, 2018, through RCA Records. It features guest appearances from Alicia Keys and Chris Stapleton, while production was handled by Timberlake, The Neptunes, Timbaland, Danja, J-Roc, Eric Hudson, and Rob Knox. The album sees Timberlake combining his R&B and pop sound with elements of funk, soul, and Americana. The album is named after his son Silas, whose name means "man of the forest".

Supported by three singles: "Filthy", "Supplies", and "Say Something", Man of the Woods received mixed reviews from music critics and debuted atop the US Billboard 200, and topped the album charts in numerous international markets, including Canada, the Czech Republic, Denmark, Flanders, Germany, and the Netherlands. To promote the album, Timberlake embarked on his sixth concert tour, The Man of the Woods Tour, in March 2018. The single "Say Something" received a nomination for Best Pop Duo/Group Performance at the 61st Annual Grammy Awards.

== Background ==
After completing the successful world tour for his previous records, The 20/20 Experience and The 20/20 Experience – 2 of 2, Timberlake took a one-year break and later returned to produce the soundtrack for the animated film Trolls in 2016. In a radio interview in May 2016, Timberlake first confirmed working on a new album but without a date set for release yet: "I think where I grew up in America has a lot of influence – Growing up in Tennessee – very central of the country – Memphis is known as the birthplace of rock & roll, but also the home of the blues, but Nashville's right down the street so there's a lot of country music." Timberlake stated, "It sounds more like where I've come from than any other music I've ever made [...] It's Southern American music. But I want to make it sound modern – at least that's the idea right now." In December 2017, Timberlake's website displayed the logo featuring the letters "MOTW". Rolling Stone's physical magazine reported that the album would feature a collaboration with singer-songwriter Chris Stapleton. Stapleton and Timberlake previously collaborated in a live performance at the 2015 CMA Awards, with some music publications speculating that his next record may be influenced by Southern music.

== Release and promotion ==
Timberlake headlined the Super Bowl LII halftime show at U.S. Bank Stadium in Minneapolis, Minnesota, on February 4, 2018. He confirmed via his social media pages that Man of the Woods will be released on February 2, with a video trailer introducing the album and the influence behind it: "This album is really inspired by my son, my wife, my family, but more so than any other album I've ever written, where I'm from." The album's lead single, "Filthy", was released on January 5 along with the album pre-order. The song was released with a music video, and three additional videos by different directors were released weekly beginning January 18, with "Supplies" being the first, followed by the Chris Stapleton-featuring "Say Something" and "Man of the Woods". He also performed at the 2018 Brit Awards.

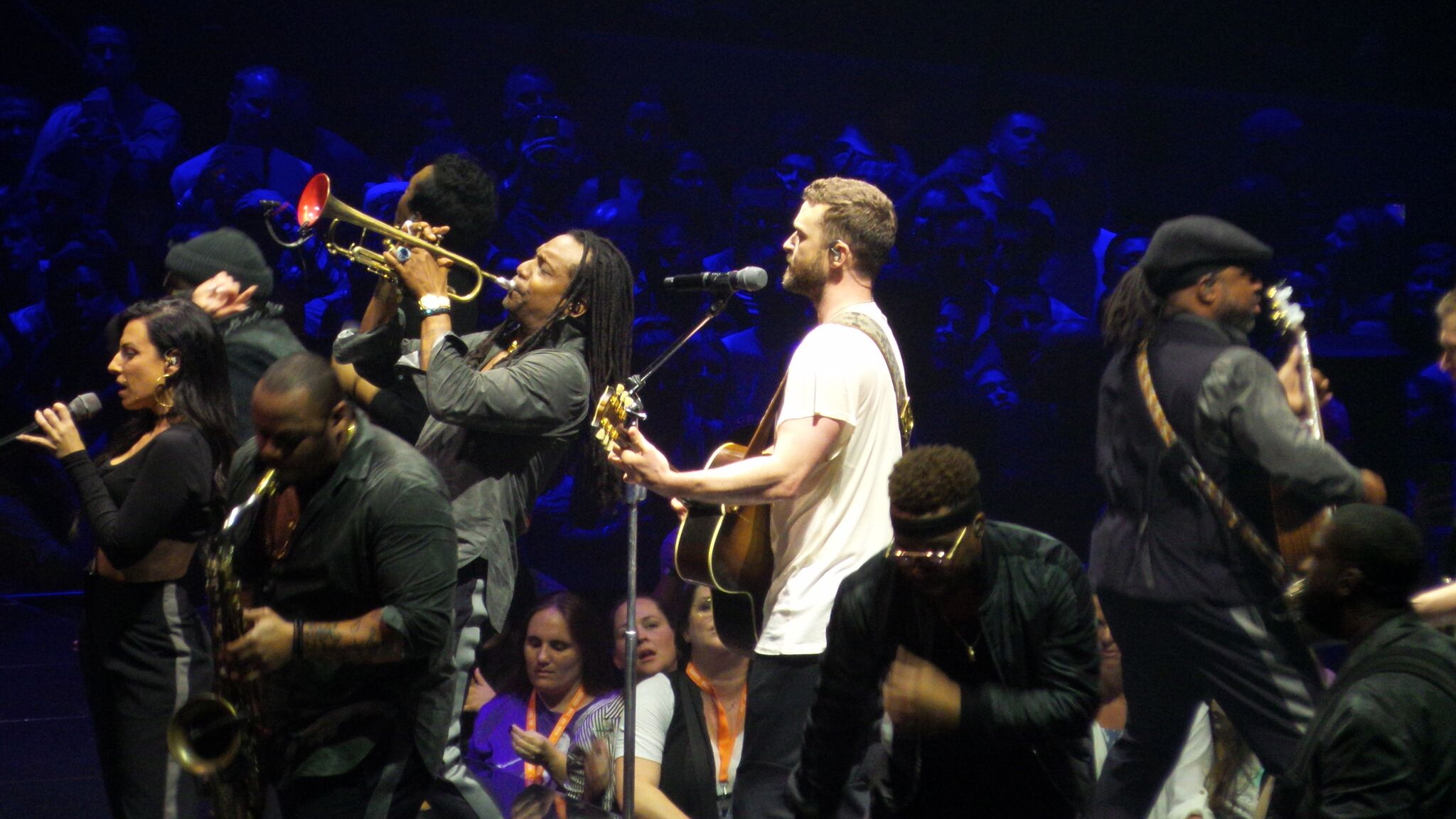
Timberlake and the Tennessee Kids on The Man of the Woods Tour.

With the announcement of "Filthy", Variety confirmed guest appearances by Stapleton, The Neptunes, and Alicia Keys on the album. The cover art was photographed by Ryan McGinley. An exclusive version of the album and its vinyl edition was made available at Target; both were made available for pre-sale the day "Filthy" was released. In February, Timberlake opened a pop-up shop in New York City with limited edition merchandise featuring a total of 16 different brand collaborations, each paired with a song, centered on the concept "country meets streetwear". Since May 2018, the Museum of Pop Culture's Holodome exhibits a 360° immersive reality space presentation by Timberlake performing "Montana", set in Montana by a lake.

Although not included on the album, Timberlake released the single "SoulMate" to coincide with the summer leg of The Man of the Woods Tour.

== Recording ==
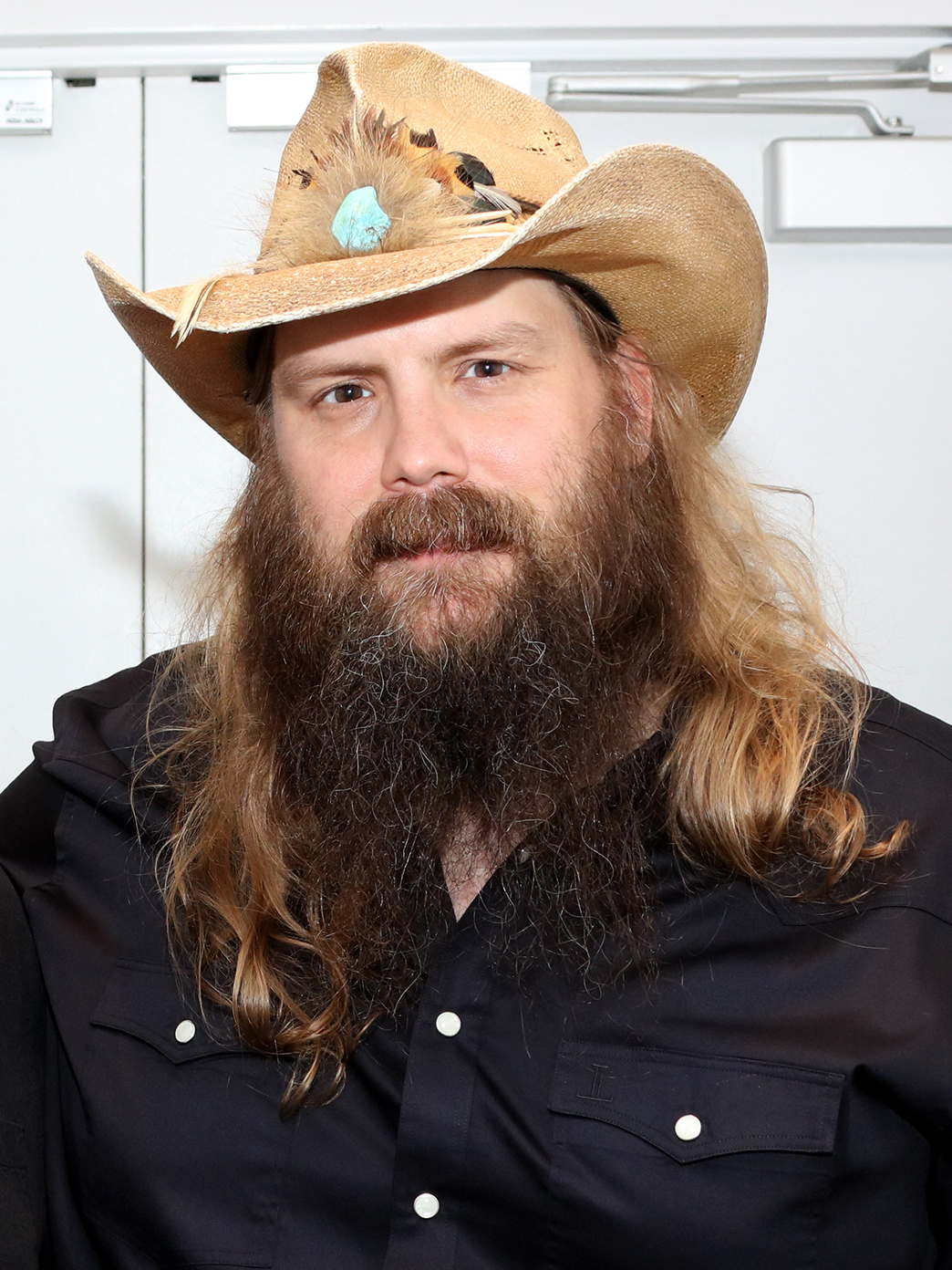
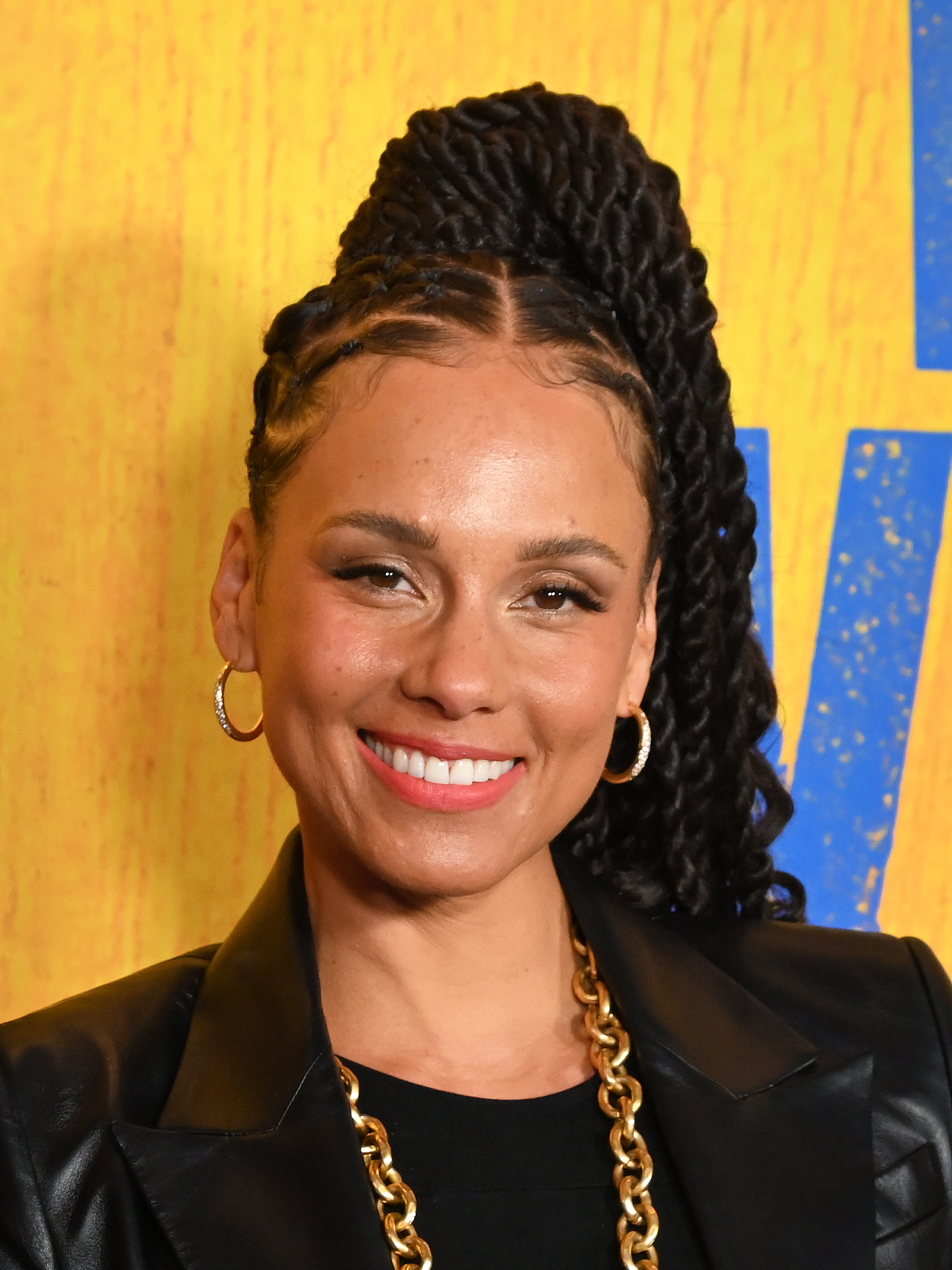
Chris Stapleton (left) is featured on the album's third single, "Say Something", while Alicia Keys (right) is featured on the album's eighth song, "Morning Light".

Initial discussions for the album began several years before the production of the album, between Timberlake and Pharrell Williams. Production was put on hold for two years while Timberlake and his wife, Jessica Biel, had their son, Silas. Production began between Timberlake, Williams, and Chad Hugo, with the first song for the album being the title track, which is the Latin translation of Timberlake's son's name. Timberlake had not worked with Williams and Hugo (also known as production duo The Neptunes) after a label dispute with rap group Clipse during Timberlake's time with Jive Records. During an interview with Beats 1's Zane Lowe, Timberlake said: "It became challenging for him to work with any Jive artist at that point. If I'm being totally honest about it I was extremely hurt being caught up in the middle of it, but at the same time I had a shitload of money stolen, you know, from me by somebody else when I was in the group. I had already gone through legal troubles, and I kind of felt like, you know what, I'm at this point where I feel like I have so much ahead of me, I just don't want to be in the middle of the record label and somebody that, you know, I consider a friend. And so I feel like I kind of just removed myself from the situation."

As with FutureSex/LoveSounds, recording sessions for the album were loose and had multiple studios open for work. In one room, Danja and Timbaland worked, Chad Hugo and Pharrell Williams of The Neptunes worked in another, and producer and member of The Y's, Rob Knox and Eric Hudson worked in another. The album's direction was not discussed too much among the production team, as Timberlake already had an idea of the direction he wanted the album to take.

In an interview with Complex, producer Danja spoke of the recording sessions for Man of the Woods: "We didn't have any conversations about the current state of music and that's what we always do. We go in the studio and just do what we feel. This time around, I just feel like he had more of a direction. Like, when we did FutureSex/LoveSounds, we didn't have any conversations of direction or what's going on in the current state of music. We went in and had fun and made music." He also spoke about the vision that Timberlake had for the album: "I remember walking into the studio, and I'm like, 'So, what's the vibe?' He just raised his hands up like, 'This is the vibe.' And what he had on was a flannel, some Adidas, some jeans. He had his beard and a skully on. That was the vibe."

Timberlake's wife, Jessica Biel, and his son Silas have uncredited vocals on a number of songs on the album. Biel appears on the album's lead single "Filthy" and "Hers (Interlude)". When sequencing the album, Timberlake felt that "Filthy" was "a palette-cleanser, then we wanted to take you into the forest, take you outside, so I felt like I needed a voice of consciousness". Timberlake wrote Biel's parts for her, which were subsequently recorded on the Voicenotes iPhone application. Timberlake wanted her to sound like "the ghost, a presence, but we're following [her]". The "Hers (Interlude)" was recorded after Timberlake mixed the album's eleventh song, "Flannel".

When announcing his Man of the Woods Tour, Timberlake revealed the inspiration for both the album and tour came from the outdoors as well as his family: "The outdoors is the inspiration for a lot of these songs. That's the main idea. The tour will be able to bring the outside in. How can we bring that to life? I want people to see the inspiration for how it ended up sounding. I've never seen that done before: Bring the outside in."

Chris Stapleton (who is featured on the album's third single "Say Something") was initially only writing songs with Timberlake before being asked to sing on the song. Stapleton noted: "I really just went out to Los Angeles to write songs with him, it's a very fluid process with him, there's a lot going on. That was one of those things where there wasn't necessarily a plan. He was like 'All right, you hop in there and take a verse,' and I'm like, 'You want me to do what?' ... It came out great. I had a blast with him, he's a great creative force and one of those guys that if you get a chance to work with him, you should." Stapleton also has writing credits on other songs on the album, including the Alicia Keys-featuring "Morning Light" and "The Hard Stuff", as well as guitar on the lead single "Filthy".

== Music ==
The genre of the album incorporates traditional R&B as well as influences from country and funk described as "...Americana with 808s". In a second teaser trailer for the album, Timberlake said that it has a number of influences. "It's meant to be heard outside even more than inside, I believe. You talk about those, like, Southern guitars and that sound that feels like heritage. That is me exercising my love for where I came from." Rolling Stone described most of the album's first half as "cosmopolitan future-funk", while Variety stated the music is funk-soul.

Ahead of the album release, Timberlake hosted a listening session with music industry insiders and members of the press. The Associated Press commented that the album features pop, R&B, and electronic tracks.

== Critical reception ==
Professional ratings
Aggregate scores
Source	Rating
AnyDecentMusic?	4.7/10
Metacritic	55/100
Review scores
Source	Rating
AllMusic	2.5/5 stars
The A.V. Club	B−
The Daily Telegraph	3/5 stars
Entertainment Weekly	B
The Guardian	3/5 stars
The Independent	3/5 stars
NME	3/5 stars
The Observer	2/5 stars
Pitchfork	3.8/10
Rolling Stone	3.5/5 stars

Man of the Woods received mixed reviews from music critics. At Metacritic, which assigns a normalized rating out of 100 to reviews from mainstream critics, the album received an average score of 55, based on 29 reviews, which indicates "mixed or average reviews".

In Rolling Stone, Christopher R. Weingarten gave the album a positive review, saying that "parts of Man of the Woods are his most exploratory music in years". In Variety, Chris Willman expressed that "there are plenty of reasons to like Man of the Woods, not least that it's got a good beat and you can dance to it", and concluded, "It's the utterly weird boldness of Timberlake figuratively dragging Pharrell and Danja into the middle of a frosty field that makes the album memorable. This is undeniably the real him right now – funkster, family man, firewalker". Jason Lipshutz of Billboard summarized his review, saying, "Man of the Woods is worth exploring, but it's already worth wondering how Timberlake follows it". Q said "throughout, Man of the Woods seesaws brilliantly between pop and country". Billboard included it among the best 50 albums of the first half of 2018.

Man of the Woods received a B from Entertainment Weekly, while The Guardian and NME gave it three out of five stars. In her review for The A.V. Club, Annie Zaleski said, "At its best, this approach leads to sonic whirlwinds". Brock Radke of Las Vegas Weekly deemed it Timberlake's "most experimental album" that is "far from a failure, and that's because its bright spots will accomplish the singular goal of all of Timberlake's music: making non-dancing people get up and dance without remorse or self-consciousness." He considered "Higher, Higher" the album's best track and "Midnight Summer Jam" a "throwback soul party a la Earth, Wind & Fire". In Exclaim!, Ian Gormely gave the album a 5 out of 10 score, saying that the album is "immaculately produced and performed" but also noting that "sound and feel are no substitute for soul". Jamieson Cox of Pitchfork rated the album 3.8/10 and called it "a huge misstep for the pop star" as well as "warm, indulgent, inert, and vacuous".

== Commercial performance ==
Man of the Woods debuted at number one on the US Billboard 200 with 293,000 album-equivalent units, making it the biggest first week of the year at the time, and gave Timberlake his fourth consecutive number-one album in the country. It is also his fourth album to top the Canadian Albums Chart, opening at the country's summit with 18,000 consumption units. During its second chart week, Man of the Woods dropped one spot to number two on the Billboard 200, selling 74,000 total units. In its third chart week, the album remained in the top ten of the Billboard 200, charting at number six and selling 38,000 total units. It fell out of the top ten to number eleven, selling 28,000 total units in its fourth chart week. In March 2018, Man of the Woods was certified Gold by the Recording Industry Association of America (RIAA) for sales of over 500,000 album-equivalent units in the US.

In 2018, Man of the Woods was ranked as the 46th most popular album of the year on the Billboard 200. Timberlake was named Amazon Prime's most streamed artist of the year, as well as the 24th top artist of the year by Billboard. Man of the Woods concluded 2018 as the sixth best-selling album of the year and the 31st most consumed album of the year overall. As of January 2019, Man of the Woods has sold over 774,000 album-equivalent units in the US, with over 422,000 being pure sales. In September 2021, Man of the Woods was certified Platinum by the RIAA for sales of over 1,000,000 album-equivalent units in the US, becoming Timberlake's fifth consecutive platinum album.

== Track listing ==
Man of the Woods track listing
No.	Title	Writer(s)	Producer(s)	Length
1.	"Filthy"	Justin Timberlake; Timothy Mosley; Nate Hills; James Fauntleroy; Larrance Dopson	Timbaland; Timberlake; Danja	4:53
2.	"Midnight Summer Jam"	Timberlake; Pharrell Williams; Chad Hugo	The Neptunes; Timberlake^{[b]}	5:12
3.	"Sauce"	Timberlake; Hills; Elliott Ives; Mosley	Danja; Timberlake; Ives^{[b]}	4:05
4.	"Man of the Woods"	Timberlake; Williams; Hugo	The Neptunes; Timberlake^{[b]}	4:03
5.	"Higher Higher"	Timberlake; Williams; Hugo	The Neptunes; Timberlake^{[b]}	4:18
6.	"Wave"	Timberlake; Williams; Hugo	The Neptunes; Timberlake^{[b]}	4:24
7.	"Supplies"	Timberlake; Williams; Hugo	The Neptunes; Timberlake^{[b]}	3:45
8.	"Morning Light" (featuring Alicia Keys)	Timberlake; Chris Stapleton; Robin Tadross; Eric Hudson; Ives	Rob Knox; Timberlake; Hudson^{[a]}	4:03
9.	"Say Something" (featuring Chris Stapleton)	Timberlake; Stapleton; Mosley; Hills; Dopson	Timbaland; Timberlake; Danja; Dopson^{[b]}	4:38
10.	"Hers (Interlude)"	Timberlake	Timberlake	1:01
11.	"Flannel"	Timberlake; Williams; Hugo	The Neptunes; Timberlake^{[b]}	4:49
12.	"Montana"	Timberlake; Williams; Hugo	The Neptunes; Timberlake^{[b]}	4:39
13.	"Breeze Off the Pond"	Timberlake; Williams; Hugo	The Neptunes; Timberlake^{[b]}	4:11
14.	"Livin' Off the Land"	Timberlake; Williams; Hugo	The Neptunes; Timberlake^{[b]}	4:53
15.	"The Hard Stuff"	Timberlake; Stapleton; Tadross; Hudson; Ives	Knox; Timberlake	3:15
16.	"Young Man"	Timberlake; Mosley; Jerome Harmon; Fauntleroy	Timbaland; Timberlake; Jerome "J-Roc" Harmon	3:45
Total length:				65:54

=== Notes ===
- ^{^[a]} signifies a co-producer.
- ^{^[b]} signifies an additional producer.
- "Sauce" contains a sample from "Juice vs. Sauce" by GinoRuss.
- "Livin' Off the Land" contains an audio sample from the TV show Mountain Men.
- "Young Man" contains a sample from "La La Eh" from Ashley & Bobby's album It's a Beautiful Day to Play.

== Credits and personnel ==
=== Musicians ===
- Justin Timberlake – lead and background vocals, guitars (4, 9, 11, 12, 14), additional keyboards (5), instruments (10), harmonium (11)
- Rhea Dummett – additional vocals (13)
- Jerome "J-Roc" Harmon – keyboards (16)
- Eric Hudson – keyboards (8, 15), bass (8)
- Chad Hugo – clavinet (2), Moog (4, 5, 12), organ (5), accordion (11), synthesizers (13)
- Elliott Ives – guitars (1–9, 11–16), harmonica (2), ukulele (6)
- Larrance Dopson – keyboards (1)
- Peter Lee Johnson – strings (2, 8, 10, 15)
- Alicia Keys – vocals (8)
- Mike Larson – Moog programming (12), synth programming (13)
- Raphael Saadiq – bass and electric guitar (6)
- Chris Stapleton – guitars (8, 9, 15), vocals (9)
- Jessica Biel – additional vocals (1, 2, 11, 16), narration (10)
- Silas Timberlake – additional vocals (16)
- Pharrell Williams – additional vocals (2, 6, 7)

=== Production ===
- Executive music producer: Justin Timberlake
- All vocals produced and arranged by Justin Timberlake
- Engineered by Chris Godbey (1, 3, 9, 10, 16), Andrew Coleman and Mike Larson (2, 4–7, 11–14), Ben Chang (8, 15)
  - Assisted by Ben Sedano (1, 2, 4–9, 11–16), Jon Sher (2, 4, 6, 7, 11–16), Eric Eylands (2, 4, 11, 14), John Armstrong (2, 5, 12), Tyler Shields (2, 6), Jeremy Miller (2, 6), Sean Klein (3, 10), Funai Costa (5), Martin Giraldo (5), Joshua Harris (5, 12)
- Mixed by Chris Godbey at Jungle City Studios, NYC
  - Assisted by Sean Klein
- Mastered by Dave Kutch at the Mastering Palace, NYC
- Digital team: Brad Margolis, Rachael Yarbrough, Faith-Ann Young
- Creative direction: Trace Ayala and David Cho
- Photography: Ryan McGinley
- Art direction and design: GrandArmy
- Groomer: Christine Nelli
- Stylist: Annie Psaltaris
- Stylist assistant: Dolly Pratt

== Charts ==
=== Weekly charts ===
Weekly chart performance for Man of the Woods
Chart (2018)	Peak position
Australian Albums (ARIA)	2
Austrian Albums (Ö3 Austria)	4
Belgian Albums (Ultratop Flanders)	1
Belgian Albums (Ultratop Wallonia)	6
Canadian Albums (Billboard)	1
Croatian International Albums (HDU)	30
Czech Albums (ČNS IFPI)	1
Danish Albums (Hitlisten)	1
Dutch Albums (Album Top 100)	1
Finnish Albums (Suomen virallinen lista)	11
French Albums (SNEP)	7
German Albums (Offizielle Top 100)	1
Hungarian Albums (MAHASZ)	12
Irish Albums (IRMA)	3
Italian Albums (FIMI)	8
Japan Hot Albums (Billboard Japan)	18
Japanese Albums (Oricon)	32
New Zealand Albums (RMNZ)	3
Norwegian Albums (VG-lista)	8
Polish Albums (ZPAV)	2
Portuguese Albums (AFP)	7
Scottish Albums (Official Charts)	3
Slovak Albums (IFPI)	2
Spanish Albums (Promusicae)	7
Swedish Albums (Sverigetopplistan)	6
Swiss Albums (Schweizer Hitparade)	2
UK Albums (Official Charts)	2
US Billboard 200	1

=== Year-end charts ===
Year-end chart performance for Man of the Woods
Chart (2018)	Position
Australian Albums (ARIA)	100
Belgian Albums (Ultratop Flanders)	26
Belgian Albums (Ultratop Wallonia)	115
Canadian Albums (Billboard)	42
Danish Albums (Hitlisten)	35
Dutch Albums (MegaCharts)	52
French Albums (SNEP)	176
German Albums (Offizielle Top 100)	67
South Korean International Albums (Gaon)	28
Swiss Albums (Schweizer Hitparade)	56
US Billboard 200	46

== Certifications ==
Certifications and sales for Man of the Woods
Region	Certification	Certified units/sales
Brazil (Pro-Música Brasil)	Platinum	40,000^{‡}
Canada (Music Canada)	Gold	40,000^{‡}
Denmark (IFPI Danmark)	Platinum	20,000^{‡}
New Zealand (RMNZ)	Gold	7,500^{‡}
Poland (ZPAV)	Platinum	20,000^{‡}
United Kingdom (BPI)	Silver	60,000^{‡}
United States (RIAA)	Platinum	1,000,000^{‡}
^{‡} Sales+streaming figures based on certification alone.

== Release history ==
Release dates for Man of the Woods
Region	Date	Format(s)	Label	Ref.
Various	February 2, 2018	CD; digital download; streaming	RCA	
United States	February 2, 2018	Vinyl	RCA	
