= SoulMate =

Single by Justin Timberlake
- Released: July 3, 2018
- Recorded: 2018
- Genre: Pop-soul
- Length: 3:16
- Label: RCA
- Songwriters: Justin Timberlake; James Fauntleroy; Paul Jefferies; Brian Casey; Gary Smith; Bert Young; Brandon Casey
- Producers: Nineteen85; Justin Timberlake

Justin Timberlake singles chronology
"Say Something" (2018)	"SoulMate" (2018)	"Believe" (2020)

"SoulMate" is a song recorded by American singer-songwriter Justin Timberlake. It was written and produced by Timberlake and Nineteen85, with additional writing from James Fauntleroy, Brian Casey, Gary Smith, Bert Young and Brandon Casey. The song was described as a return to form for Timberlake, following his country-influenced album Man of the Woods (2018). Its release coincided with the summer leg of The Man of the Woods Tour.

== Credits and personnel ==
Credits are adapted from Tidal.

- Justin Timberlake – vocals, composer, lyricist, vocal producer
- James Fauntleroy – vocals, composer, lyricist
- Paul Jefferies – composer, producer, keyboard, drums
- Brian Casey – composer, lyricist
- Brandon Casey – composer, lyricist
- Gary Smith – composer, lyricist
- Bert Young – composer, lyricist
- Chris Godbey – mixing engineer, recording engineer
- Chris Athens – mastering engineer
- Dalton "D-10" Tennant – bass
- Elliot Ives – guitar

== Charts ==
Chart performance for "SoulMate"
Chart (2018)	Peak position
Belgium (Ultratip Bubbling Under Flanders)	4
Belgium (Ultratip Bubbling Under Wallonia)	12
Canada Hot 100 (Billboard)	83
Canada AC (Billboard)	45
Canada CHR/Top 40 (Billboard)	39
Canada Hot AC (Billboard)	39
Japan Hot 100 (Billboard)	51
Netherlands (Dutch Tipparade 40)	17
Netherlands (Single Tip)	4
Sweden (Sverigetopplistan)	42
US Adult Contemporary (Billboard)	29
US Adult Pop Airplay (Billboard)	25
US Pop Airplay (Billboard)	34
