= Man of the Woods (song) =

Single by Justin Timberlake

from the album Man of the Woods
- Released: February 2, 2018
- Length: 4:03
- Label: RCA
- Songwriters: Justin Timberlake; Pharrell Williams; Chad Hugo
- Producer: The Neptunes

Music video
- "Man of the Woods" on YouTube

"Man of the Woods" is a song by American singer-songwriter Justin Timberlake. It was released alongside his fifth studio album of the same name on February 2, 2018. The song was produced by the Neptunes duo members Pharrell Williams and Chad Hugo, and it was additionally produced by Timberlake, while all three wrote it. Its music video was directed by Paul Hunter and released on the same day.

== Music video ==
Directed by Paul Hunter, the video was released the same day as the song and album. The clip sees Timberlake making a journey across a rugged landscape. During most of the video, Timberlake is looking straight into the camera, as it is filmed from his wife Jessica Biel's perspective until the singer encounters her. Eventually, he enters a log cabin, wherein he shares a ballroom dance with Biel. As described by a The Hollywood Reporter editor, the video "leans into the folky, campfire imagery of the album's title."

The music video on YouTube has received over 35 million views as of March 2024.

== Charts ==
Chart (2018)	Peak position
Canada Hot 100 (Billboard)	63
France (SNEP)	101
Germany (GfK)	80
Netherlands (Single Top 100)	100
New Zealand Heatseekers (RMNZ)	2
Switzerland (Schweizer Hitparade)	48
UK Singles (Official Charts)	91
US Billboard Hot 100	73
