= Filthy (song) =

2018 single by Justin Timberlake

Single by Justin Timberlake

from the album Man of the Woods
- Released: January 5, 2018
- Studio: Conway (Los Angeles)
- Genre: Electro-funk; electropop; R&B
- Length: 4:53 (album version); 4:13 (radio edit)
- Label: RCA
- Songwriters: Justin Timberlake; Timothy Mosley; Nate Hills; James Fauntleroy; Larrance Dopson
- Producers: Timbaland; Justin Timberlake; Danja

Justin Timberlake singles chronology
"Can't Stop the Feeling!" (2016)	"Filthy" (2018)	"Supplies" (2018)

Music video
- "Filthy" on YouTube

"Filthy" is a song recorded by American singer Justin Timberlake for his fifth studio album, Man of the Woods (2018). RCA Records released the song for digital download and streaming on January 5, 2018, as the album's lead single. Timberlake co-wrote and co-produced the track with Timbaland and Danja, with James Fauntleroy and Larrance Dopson providing additional songwriting. It was also recorded at Conway Recording Studios, based in Hollywood, Los Angeles. The song is an electro-funk, electropop, and R&B tune in the key of G major that includes funky, electro-R&B elements and humorous lyrics.

Upon being released, "Filthy" received generally positive reviews from music critics and debuted at number 9 on the US Billboard Hot 100; additionally, it reached the top 10 in six international markets: Canada, Israel, Mexico, the Netherlands, New Zealand, and Scotland. It was certified platinum by Music Canada and the Recording Industry Association of America (RIAA); gold by the Australian Recording Industry Association (ARIA), Pro-Música Brasil (PMB), and the Polish Society of the Phonographic Industry (ZPAV); and silver by the British Phonographic Industry (BPI).

An accompanying music video for "Filthy" was directed by Mark Romanek and premiered on the same day as the song's release. Set at a futuristic technology conference, it shows Timberlake staging a proof-of-concept demo for a robot. It received a nomination for Best Choreography at the 2018 MTV Video Music Awards, but lost to "This Is America" by Childish Gambino. Timberlake promoted "Filthy" with a performance at the Super Bowl LII halftime show in 2018 and included it on the set list of his sixth concert tour, The Man of the Woods Tour (2018–2019).

== Background and composition ==
"Filthy" was announced as the first single from Justin Timberlake's fifth studio album, Man of the Woods (2018), on January 3, 2018, one day after Man of the Woods was confirmed. Timberlake, Timbaland, and Danja, all of whom first collaborated on FutureSex/LoveSounds, co-wrote the song with James Fauntleroy and Larrance Dopson from the production team 1500 or Nothin'. In an interview with Complex, Danja described "Filthy" as a transitional piece within the album's narrative, calling it: "the disruption between the world we're living in and his world". He said the track serves as an "in-between" moment that "wipes the palette clean", allowing Timberlake to express the story presented throughout the album, rather than directly reflecting the imagery featured in its promotional trailer.

"Filthy" was recorded by Danja and Timbaland, who worked on the song in one studio while Timberlake worked between two other studios, with Chad Hugo and Pharrell Williams of The Neptunes in one room, and Rob Knox of The Y's and Eric Hudson in the other. Timberlake would compose sections of the song in his head, as he did in the FutureSex/LoveSounds sessions. Danja added screams, moans, breaths, and the sound of a lion roaring to the song. While the breakdown was conceptualized by Timberlake, Timbaland and Danja created the breakdown as Timberlake sang the melody. Danja experimented with adding hi-hats to the song but found them unsuitable, saying: "It dates it, puts it into a place of what's happening right now. That's not where you want to be."

"Filthy" is four minutes and 53 seconds long. It is an electro-funk, electropop, and R&B song that includes funky, electro-R&B elements and, according to Billboard, combines anthemic rock with electro. The track opens with guitar licks and becomes a "sleekly" industrial, neo-funk song that includes synth and a "snaking" bassline. Timberlake speaks and sings humorous lyrics that were described as "cringeworthy" and "verg[ing] on risqué". According to Rolling Stone's Elias Leight, Timberlake keeps his voice in the middle of mix "so the singer and the music are equal partners". The outro features vocals by Jessica Biel. According to the sheet music published at Musicnotes.com by Universal Music Publishing Group, "Filthy" is in the key of G major and has a moderate tempo of 97 beats per minute. The vocal range extends from the low note of D_{4} to the high note of G_{5}.

== Critical reception ==
The Guardian journalist Ben Beaumont-Thomas gave "Filthy" five stars out of five, and said: "On the basis of Filthy, he absolutely can. Beginning with some bombastic guitar rock, it transmogrifies into a beautifully dark, undulating funk track underpinned by a whiplash bass womp". He described the song as a "grownup funk masterpiece" and added: "the chorus, which modulates into a sweeter, smoother key, is signature Timberlake". In XXL, C. Vernon Coleman II stated the production provides a "fitting soundscape for the single, as they deploy out of this world synths with pulsating 808s". In NME, Larry Barleet reacted positively, stating: "Timberlake pulls it off ... what's really brilliant about 'Filthy' is that it's proof that JT isn't done with innovating". From BrooklynVegan, Andrew Sacher described the track as "the kind of futuristic R&B that JT has always done". Rap-Up said the "dance-ready" track finds the team experimenting with "a new futuristic sound". Christopher R. Weingarten of Rolling Stone said it is difficult to call the song pop "since the production is so avant-garde". He added the producers, Timbaland and Danja, "conjure a testosterone electronic chainsaw grind and match it with vintage Larry Graham-style slap bass: The fact that the two musical elements don't exactly match groovewise creates a beautiful and disorienting tension unlike anything on the radio".

Ed Masley of The Arizona Republic described the "electro-funk sex jam" as "suitably robotic". According to Chris Willman of Variety, in the context of the album, the single and visuals may represent Timberlake's former self, "albeit one who's clearly still capable of coming to the phone, still getting his sexy-back kicks in before the muse draws him into a more reflective forest". In Billboard, Katie Atkinson ranked it 11th among all of Timberlake's singles, and said "the funky Timbaland beat and tongue-in-cheek lyrics were a welcome, loose surprise". Jon Caramanica of The New York Times called it an "unimaginative but slyly effective electro-funk vamp with acid house accents ... It's cyclical and deliberate, like late-1970s big-band soul music". In The Ringer, Lindsay Zoladz said it "sounds like a new-millennium update" of David Bowie's "Fame" (1975). Bryan Rolli of The Daily Dot said the song "sounds right at home next to other JT smash hits such as 'Suit & Tie' and 'SexyBack,'" while the singer "delivers a sensual, understated vocal performance". Amanda Petrusich of The New Yorker said Timberlake's comportment "remains un-self-serious" and that he "understands pop music as being chiefly about joy and release".

Other writers expressed unfavorable opinions. In Pitchfork, Katherine St. Asaph criticized "Filthy"'s lyrics and sound. Will Lavin of Joe said it sounds "dated, clunky and out of touch". Eric Renner of Entertainment Weekly called it "empty", and said it is a "stuttering mess of electronic and funk". Sal Cinquemani of Slant Magazine described it as "busy" and "more of a mood than an actual song".

== Release and commercial performance ==
RCA Records released "Filthy" for digital download and streaming on January 5, 2018, as the lead single from Man of the Woods. Sony Music also issued the track for radio airplay in Italy, while BBC Radio 1 began adding it to playlists on the same day. In the United States, "Filthy" was released to hot adult contemporary stations on January 8, 2018, and was sent to rhythmic contemporary and contemporary hit radio stations a day later.

In North America, "Filthy" peaked at number nine on the US Billboard Hot 100. On airplay charts, it peaked at number 28 on Adult Contemporary, number 19 on Adult Pop Airplay, number 23 on Dance Airplay, number 27 on Dance Club Songs, number 16 on Pop Airplay, and number 20 on Rhythmic Airplay. The Recording Industry Association of America (RIAA) certified it platinum for shipments of 1,000,000 units. "Filthy" peaked at number five on the Canadian Hot 100 and number two on the Canadian Digital Song Sales chart. On airplay charts, it peaked at number 26 on Canada AC, number 14 on Canada CHR/Top 40, and number 18 on Canada Hot AC. Music Canada certified "Filthy" platinum for shipments of 80,000 units. The song peaked at number 22 on Mexico Airplay and number 9 on Mexico Ingles Airplay. In South America, it peaked at number 44 in Colombia and was certified gold in Brazil by Pro-Música Brasil (PMB) for shipments of 20,000 units.

In Europe, "Filthy" peaked at number 10 on the Billboard Euro Digital Song Sales chart. It peaked at number 42 in Austria, numbers 17 and 50 in the Flanders and Wallonia regions of Belgium, number 23 in the Czech Republic, number 24 in Denmark, number 117 in France, number 42 in Germany, numbers 11 and 19 in Hungary, number 22 in the Republic of Ireland, number 55 in Italy, number 27 on the Italian Airplay chart, number 53 in the Netherlands, number 39 in Norway, number 48 in Portugal, number 8 in Scotland, number 30 in Slovakia, number 29 in Spain, number 37 in Sweden, number 34 in Switzerland, number 15 on the UK Singles Chart, and number 8 on the UK Hip Hop and R&B Singles Chart. It was certified gold by the Polish Society of the Phonographic Industry (ZPAV) for shipments of 10,000 units and silver by the British Phonographic Industry (BPI) for shipments of 200,000 units.

In Asia, "Filthy" peaked at number 8 in Israel and number 42 on the Billboard Japan Hot 100. In Oceania, it peaked at number 27 in Australia and number 2 on the Heatseeker chart in New Zealand. The Australian Recording Industry Association (ARIA) certified the song gold for shipments of 35,000 units.

== Music video and live performances ==
In its first scenes, AI mimics his creator's moves on stage.

Timberlake shared a teaser of the official music video for "Filthy" on January 4, 2018. The video, which premiered on the same day as the song's release, was directed by Mark Romanek, who had directed the music video for Timberlake's 2016 song "Can't Stop the Feeling!". In the video, Timberlake plays an inventor introducing his new work, a robot, to the public. The character was inspired by Steve Jobs; Timberlake debuts the robot on stage at the Pan-Asian Deep Learning Conference in Kuala Lumpur, Malaysia, in 2028. In the dance-centric visual, the artificial intelligence machine dances while being remotely manipulated by Timberlake. As the video progresses, the robot performs increasingly elaborate and erotic dance moves with the dancers, and is rewarded with an enthusiastic ovation from the previously expressionless audience. According to Ryan Reed of Rolling Stone, the line between creator and his invention blurs by the clip's end. For the CGI character, Timberlake and several dancers performed the motions that became the robot's moves in the final product.

According to Rachel Hahn of Vogue, Timberlake's outfit in the video is a modern take on Jobs' iconic look. Timberlake wears a Todd Snyder turtleneck, wire-frame glasses, gray pants, and classic white sneakers. "Filthy" received a nomination for Best Choreography at the 2018 MTV Video Music Awards, but lost to "This Is America" by Childish Gambino. Timberlake included "Filthy" on the set list of his Super Bowl LII halftime show performance in 2018 and his sixth concert tour, The Man of the Woods Tour (2018–2019).

== Credits and personnel ==
Credits are adapted from Tidal and the liner notes of Man of the Woods.

=== Locations ===
- Engineered at Conway Recording Studios, Los Angeles, California

=== Personnel ===
- Justin Timberlake – vocals, songwriting, production, vocal production
- Timothy Mosley – songwriting, production
- Nate Hills – songwriting, production
- James Fauntleroy – songwriting
- Larrance Dopson – songwriting, keyboards
- Chris Godbey – engineering, mixing engineer
- Dave Kutch – mastering engineer
- Ben Sedano – assisting engineer
- Sean Klein – assisting engineer
- Jessica Biel – additional vocals
- Chris Stapleton – guitar
- Elliot Ives – guitar

== Charts ==
Chart performance for "Filthy"
Chart (2018)	Peak position
Australia (ARIA)	27
Austria (Ö3 Austria Top 40)	42
Belgium (Ultratop 50 Flanders)	17
Belgium (Ultratop 50 Wallonia)	50
Canada Hot 100 (Billboard)	5
Canada AC (Billboard)	26
Canada CHR/Top 40 (Billboard)	14
Canada Hot AC (Billboard)	18
Canadian Digital Song Sales (Billboard)	2
Colombia (National-Report)	44
Czech Republic Singles Digital (ČNS IFPI)	23
Denmark (Tracklisten)	24
Euro Digital Song Sales (Billboard)	10
France (SNEP)	117
Germany (GfK)	42
Hungary (Single Top 40)	11
Hungary (Stream Top 40)	19
Ireland (IRMA)	22
Israel International Airplay (Media Forest)	8
Italy (FIMI)	55
Italian Airplay (EarOne)	27
Japan Hot 100 (Billboard)	42
Mexico Airplay (Billboard)	22
Mexico Ingles Airplay (Billboard)	9
Netherlands (Dutch Tipparade 40)	7
Netherlands (Single Top 100)	53
New Zealand Heatseekers (RMNZ)	2
Norway (VG-lista)	39
Portugal (AFP)	48
Scottish Singles Sales (Official Charts)	8
Slovakia Singles Digital (ČNS IFPI)	30
Spain (Promusicae)	29
Sweden (Sverigetopplistan)	37
Switzerland (Schweizer Hitparade)	34
UK Singles (Official Charts)	15
UK Hip Hop/R&B (Official Charts)	8
US Billboard Hot 100	9
US Adult Contemporary (Billboard)	28
US Adult Pop Airplay (Billboard)	19
US Dance Airplay (Billboard)	23
US Dance Club Songs (Billboard)	27
US Pop Airplay (Billboard)	16
US Rhythmic Airplay (Billboard)	20

== Certifications ==
Certifications and sales for "Filthy"
Region	Certification	Certified units/sales
Australia (ARIA)	Gold	35,000^{‡}
Brazil (Pro-Música Brasil)	Gold	20,000^{‡}
Canada (Music Canada)	Platinum	80,000^{‡}
Poland (ZPAV)	Gold	10,000^{‡}
United Kingdom (BPI)	Silver	200,000^{‡}
United States (RIAA)	Platinum	1,000,000^{‡}
^{‡} Sales+streaming figures based on certification alone.

== Release history ==
Release dates and formats for "Filthy"
Region	Date	Format(s)	Label	Ref.
Various	January 5, 2018	Digital download; streaming	RCA	
Italy	January 5, 2018	Radio airplay	Sony	
United States	January 8, 2018	Hot adult contemporary	RCA	
United States	January 9, 2018	Rhythmic contemporary; contemporary hit radio	RCA	
