= Super Bowl LII halftime show =

Halftime show of the 2018 Super Bowl

- Part of: Super Bowl LII
- Date: February 4, 2018
- Location: Minneapolis, Minnesota, U.S.
- Venue: U.S. Bank Stadium
- Headliner: Justin Timberlake
- Special guests: The Tennessee Kids, University of Minnesota Marching Band
- Sponsor: Pepsi
- Director: Hamish Hamilton
- Producer: Ricky Kirshner

Super Bowl halftime show chronology
| LI (2017) | LII (2018) | LIII (2019) |

The Super Bowl LII Halftime Show (officially known as the Pepsi Super Bowl LII Halftime Show) took place on February 4, 2018, at U.S. Bank Stadium in Minneapolis, Minnesota, as part of Super Bowl LII. Justin Timberlake was the featured performer, as confirmed by the National Football League (NFL) on October 22, 2017. It was televised nationally by NBC with a total of 106.6 million television viewers, down 9% from the previous years' Super Bowl LI halftime show.

== Background ==
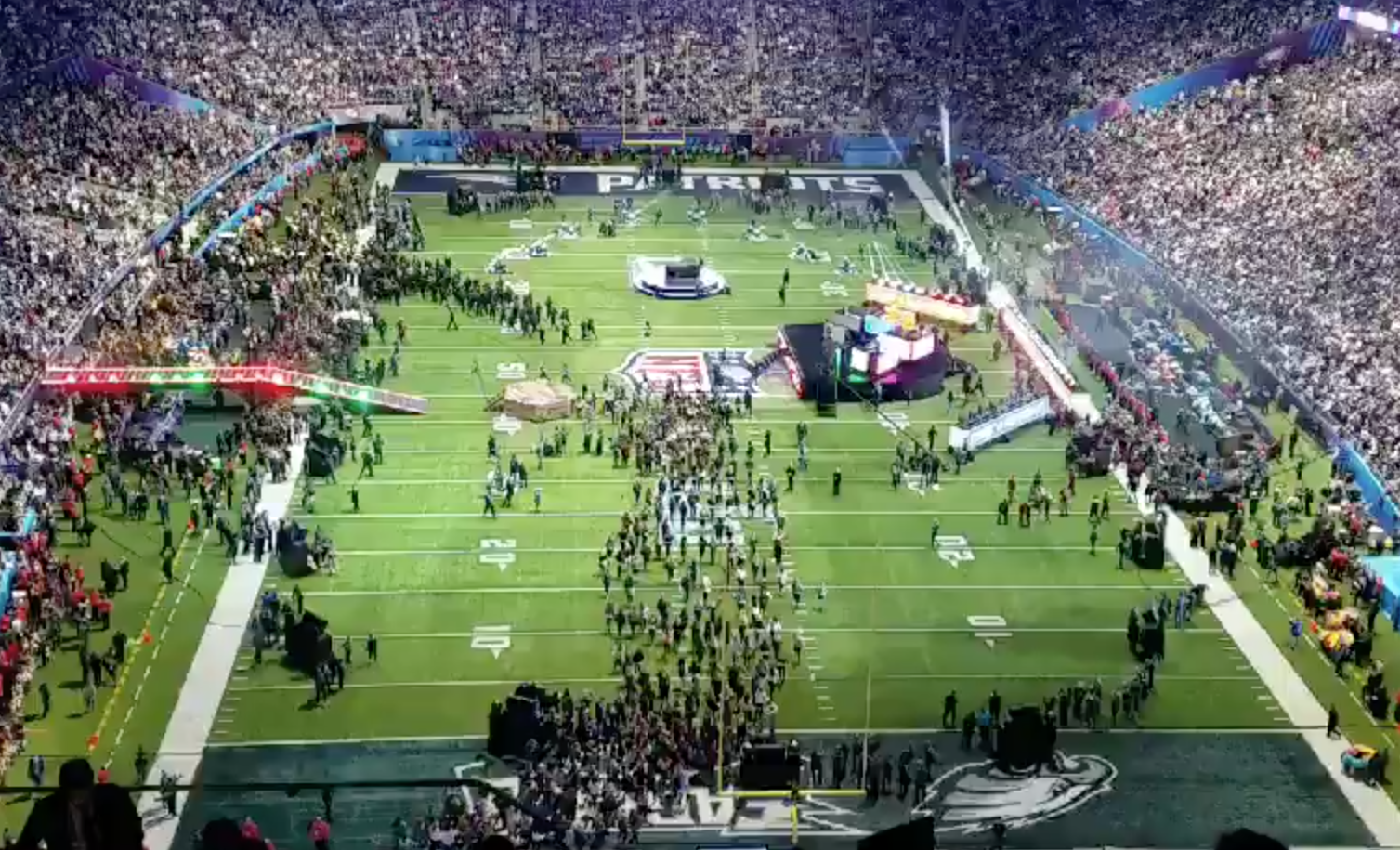
The field being set up for Timberlake's performance

In July 2017, reports emerged that Britney Spears would headline the Super Bowl LII halftime show, but the show's sponsor, Pepsi quickly denied it. During August and September 2017, several publications reported that Justin Timberlake was the frontrunner to perform at the Super Bowl LII halftime, first along with his frequent collaborator Jay-Z as co-headliner, and then as the solo performer. Jay-Z was also rumored as a solo performer, but in September, reports emerged that he turned down the offer due to the NFL's treatment of Colin Kaepernick. Jay-Z said this was the case in his 2018 song "Apeshit", but in 2020, said he declined because he was asked to bring Rihanna and Kanye West as guests, a requirement he found disrespectful: "That is not how you go about it, telling someone that they're going to do the halftime show contingent on who they bring."

On October 22, the NFL confirmed that Timberlake would be headlining with a video starring Timberlake and Jimmy Fallon. This was Timberlake's third appearance in a Super Bowl halftime show. As a member of NSYNC, Timberlake appeared in the Super Bowl XXXV halftime show (2001), and as a guest artist in the Super Bowl XXXVIII halftime show (2004), which performance featured a controversial incident where Timberlake accidentally exposed one of Janet Jackson's breasts on national television, described as a wardrobe malfunction. The Parents Television Council penned an open letter to Timberlake asking to keep the performance "family-friendly." While the organization acknowledged that Timberlake apologized for the 2004 incident, they asked him to stay true to his word, saying "we are heartened by your response that the events of 2004 are not going to happen in 2018," as the singer stated in a prior interview that "we are not going to do that again."

In an interview with Billboard, Pepsi executives expressed:

We are all big fans of Justin Timberlake. We've kind of felt that Justin deserves, and has for a number of years, to be the main artist for the halftime show because previously he wasn't the main artist. It was just about the timing. To be honest, we have discussed Justin for the last number of years for coming and doing halftime, and this year just felt really right to us. He is hands down one of the greatest entertainers currently alive, it was a no-brainer. We know he's gonna bring it.

The Halftime Show included a remembrance for Indianapolis Colts linebacker Edwin Jackson, who died just hours before Super Bowl LII after being struck by a vehicle.

== Development ==
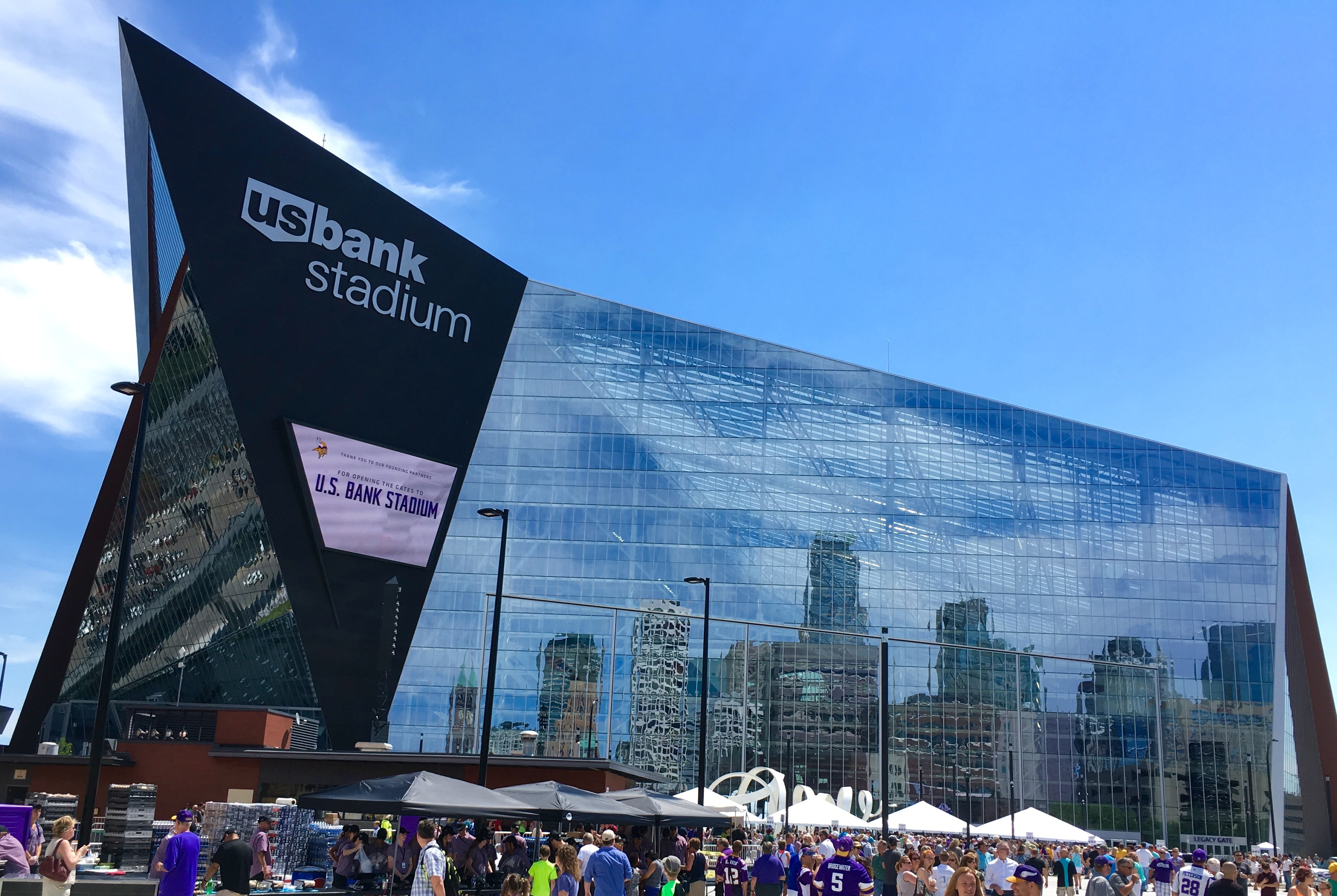
The U.S. Bank Stadium, where Super Bowl and the halftime show was held.

During the performance, Timberlake wore an outfit designed by Stella McCartney, which consists of "alter nappa fringed jacket with a shirt, featuring a landscape artwork by British artist Martin Ridley," according to a press release. Also part of the look is a Prince of Wales-check and camouflage splatter-print suit and matching jacket. As usual for McCartney, these pieces were made from animal-free leather and organic cotton.

Marty Kudelka, a longtime collaborator of Timberlake, choreographed the set. The show featured past tour dancers, Ivan Koumaev, Dana Wilson, Natalie Gilmore, Maja Karesh, Max Pham Nguyen, Codie Wiggins, Diana Matos, Lyle Beniga, Lindsay Richardson, among others.

Timberlake stated in a press conference that there would be no guest musicians in the halftime show and that the event would focus solely on himself and his backing band, the Tennessee Kids. Regarding the Prince tribute, the performance's creative visual lead, Fireplay's Nick Whitehouse, told Rolling Stone:

Paying tribute to Prince was something JT highlighted as an important moment for this show, and we spent quite a bit of time ensuring this moment would be true to his legacy. Ultimately, Justin decided that the only person who could do Prince justice is Prince. The band held 50-hours worth of rehearsals in preparation for the show.

Prince had previously stated he did not want to be included in new music after death in a 1998 interview, citing The Beatles' "Free as a Bird" as an example of a practice he considered to be "demonic." His family granted permission to use Prince's likeness on the condition that it not be used in a hologram, and they approved of the final result. Sheila E, a former bandmate of Prince's who was involved in negotiations over the use of his likeness, stated that "a bigger company" (she declined to specify whether it was Pepsi or the NFL) had insisted on including the Prince apparition and that the notion was not originally Timberlake's idea.

Despite the lack of an individual guest artist, the more than 300-member University of Minnesota Marching Band was featured in the show. The band's drumline, brass, and saxophone sections pre-recorded and performed with Timberlake during his performance of "Suit & Tie." The upper woodwind and auxiliary sections led drill formations and held large mirrors during Timberlake's performance of his song "Mirrors", and acted as fans and dancers throughout other portions of the show, including the club scene at the show's opening. All members of the band were featured on the field in the show's finale, "Can't Stop the Feeling!". The band had previously performed in the halftime show of Super Bowl XXVI.

== Synopsis ==
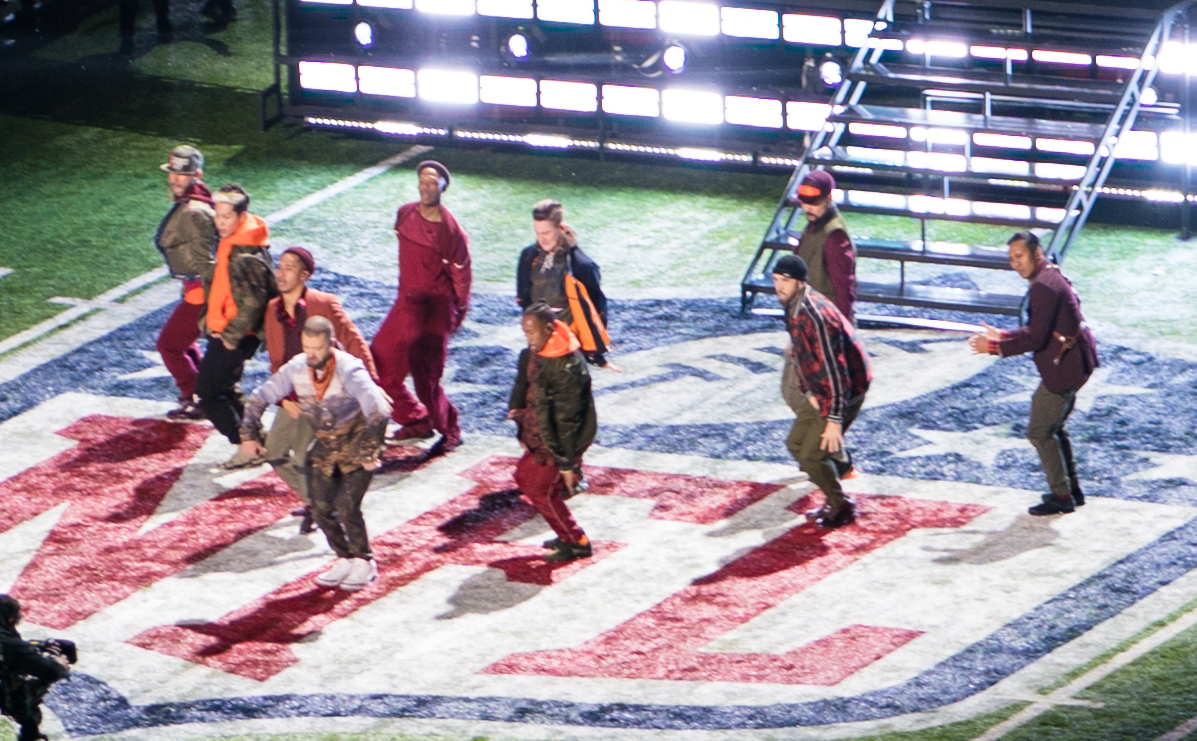
Timberlake with dancers during the halftime performance

The show began with pre-recorded footage of Jimmy Fallon introducing Timberlake. After this, Timberlake performed "Filthy" in a club setting below the field level of the stadium. He then walked up a staircase and appeared on a ramp stage extending outward into the field, descending into a series of stages surrounded by a crowd. Timberlake proceeded to move through the crowd performing "Rock Your Body" with a troupe of female backup dancers, abruptly stopping short of the end of the song and shifting to "Señorita" on a small stage with his backing dancers. Upon reaching the main stage, he performed a number of songs, including "SexyBack", "My Love", and "Cry Me a River", which featured a dance break mid-field. Upon reaching the next stage, Timberlake performed his hit song "Suit & Tie" as the University of Minnesota Marching Band, wearing black tuxedos, played backup instrumentals and marched out to meet him.

Timberlake proceeded to walk up to a white grand piano while performing "Until the End of Time", then segued into "I Would Die 4 U" as a tribute to Minneapolis-native Prince. A video of Prince performing the song played in the background, projected onto a large multi-story sheet. An aerial shot showed downtown Minneapolis covered in purple lighting that morphed into Prince's trademark Love Symbol, with the stadium at the center. He then returned to the main stage to perform "Mirrors", as hundreds of dancers and members of the marching band performed choreography using large mirrors, creating bright reflections in the broadcast and across the stadium roof. Timberlake closed the show with "Can't Stop the Feeling!", entering the stands at the conclusion of the song.

For the first time since the Super Bowl XLVI halftime show in Indianapolis in 2012, no pyrotechnics were used throughout the performance. The show relied mostly on lasers and video screens for visual effects.

== Critical response ==
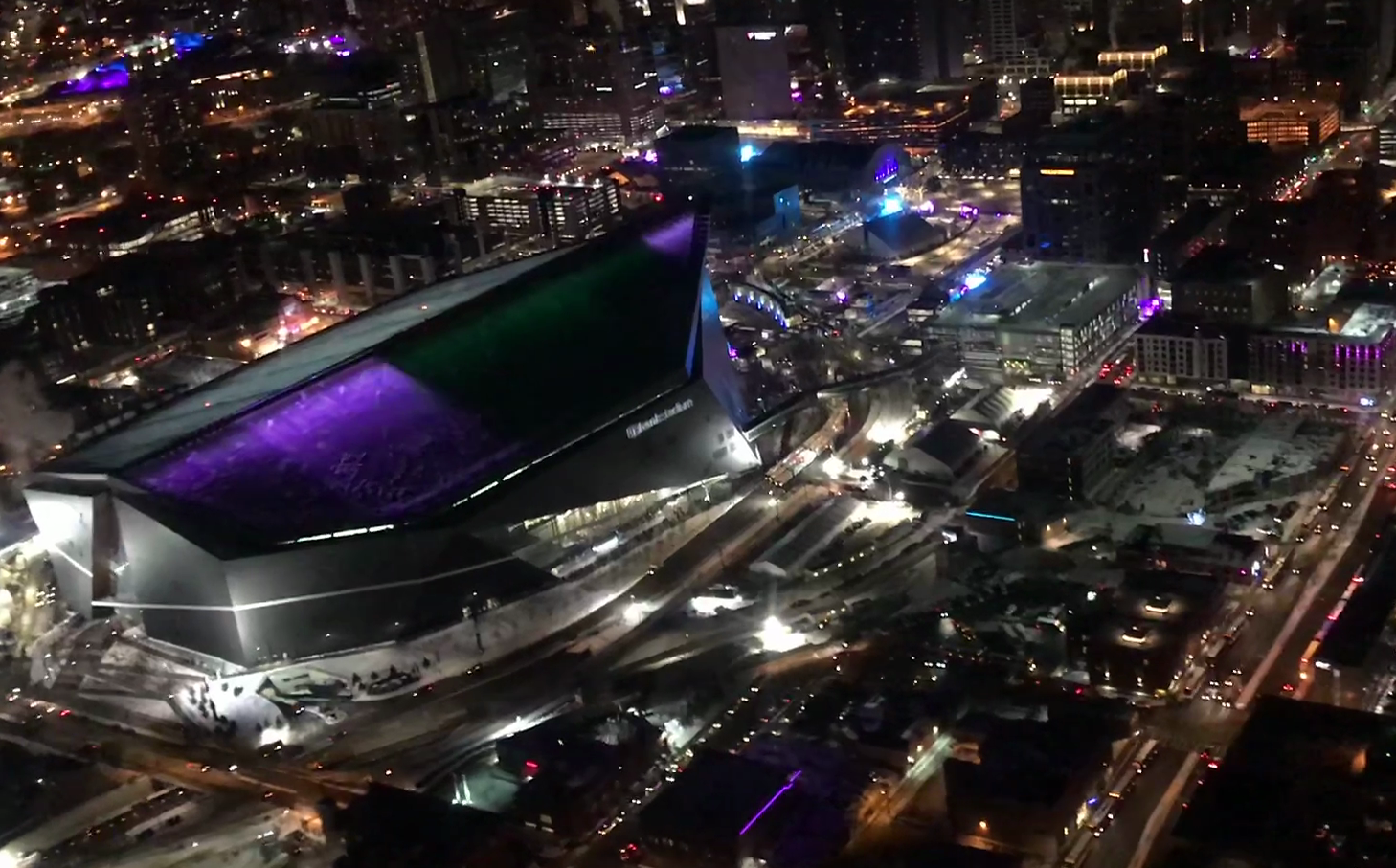
The Stadium and the city of Minneapolis were shown to be lit purple during Timberlake's tribute to Prince

Timberlake's performance received mixed reviews. In a positive review, Bruce R. Miller of Sioux City Journal wrote "Timberlake is a masterful live performer – which made Sunday's Super Bowl performance about the only sure bet," he continued commenting that the performer "did a lot of infectious dancing and managed to play with the crowd like no other." Although it did not have a moment that "stuck," he considered the Prince tribute the best moment of the show. In a similarly positive review, Taylor Weatherby of Billboard said "there is no denying that Timberlake absolutely rocked his first headlining [halftime]", further adding "Timberlake's halftime show was undeniably mesmerizing. From starting in the concourse to making his way into the crowd (and making #SelfieKid an instant superstar) for the ending." She also considered it to be a "made for a TV experience" rather than for the public in the stadium, mainly for the sound quality difficulties, but also criticized him for including Rock Your Body in the set list. From the same magazine, Nina Braca wrote "his moves were on point," and Andrew Unterberger said two things were "relatively certain" about the performance: "most of America would love it, and most of the Internet would hate it," and added Timberlake was "in a situation that was both a can't-lose and a can't-win. It would've been virtually impossible for him to please the critics he'd alienated over the last couple years." Also from Billboard, Andrew Unterberge wrote, "Timberlake's audio was somewhat lacking throughout...but the choreography, live-band energy and song selection were all pretty impeccable."

Chris Willman of Variety stated, "Timberlake turned in a more enjoyably physical performance than just about anybody else who's done the Bowl show… and if it was more a feat of athleticism than aestheticism, you can't say that's entirely inappropriate for the occasion." Willman also wrote that the show, "wasn't one for the ages, but was impressive as a show of athleticism"

Jon Caramanica of The New York Times wrote that Timberlake's performance was "heavy on dance spectacle, light on vocal authority." Daniel Fienberg of The Hollywood Reporter called the show, "energetic, but also entirely lacking in live excitement." Feinberg criticized the show for largely lacking spontaneity and live vocals. Feinberg wrote that Timberlake delivered, "one of the most over-planned, least surprising performances imaginable." Darren Franich of Entertainment Weekly graded Timberlake's performance a "C", calling it, "dutiful, and empty". Franich faulted Timberlake for playing too safe with his performance. Similarly, Fran Guan of Vulture.com wrote, "Technically speaking, Timberlake's set was a testament to precision". Guan, however, criticized Timberlake's performance from lacking in personality, and regarded his performance as unmemorable.

The Guardian gave Timberlake 3 out of 5 stars, calling his performance forgettable but flashy. In an interview with NPR, Ann Powers said that "the entire performance was shrouded in the sense of Timberlake not being right for this moment — and the Janet Jackson controversy haunted it." Daniel D'Addarrio of Time.com gave the performance a negative review, criticizing Timberlake for singing "Cry Me A River" and "Rock Your Body", calling the first song's lyrics about an evil promiscuous woman out of step with the national mood, and said that the only message from Timberlake's performance was that he loves his back catalog Deadline felt "but you could see the motions more than you felt the music." Chris Richards of The Washington Post regarded Timberlake's performance as, "unambiguously underwhelming".

USA Today and Vulture compared Timberlake's performance unfavorably against Prince's own 2007 halftime show. Amanda Petrusich of The New Yorker wrote that Timberlake's decision to omit the end of "Rock Your Body" (which was performed during the controversial 2004 halftime) felt, "less like an apology than yet more spineless deflection". However, Andrew Unterberge of Billboard considered Timberlake's decision to cut the song short to be wise. Timberlake's Stella McCartney-designed outfit received negative reviews, with some critics regarding it as "tacky". The LA Times also gave a very critical review, one which also stated that Timberlake had nothing to say in his performance, and said that it lacked soul and meaning.

At the 70th Primetime Emmy Awards, the Super Bowl halftime show received four nominations: Outstanding Directing for a Variety Special, Outstanding Lighting Design/Lighting Direction for a Variety Special, Outstanding Music Direction, Outstanding Technical Direction, Camerawork, Video Control for a Limited Series, Movie Or Special.

== Commercial reception ==
The Super Bowl LII halftime show was seen by 106.6 million television viewers in the United States, 9% less than Lady Gaga's in 2017. It had higher average viewership than the game itself, and the decline for the halftime show was roughly in line with that of the game as a whole, which had lost 7% compared to the previous year.

According to initial sales reports from Nielsen Music, sales of the songs Timberlake performed during the halftime show gained 534% in the United States on February 4, the day of the Super Bowl, compared to Feb 3, while his streams on Spotify gained 214%.

== Setlist ==
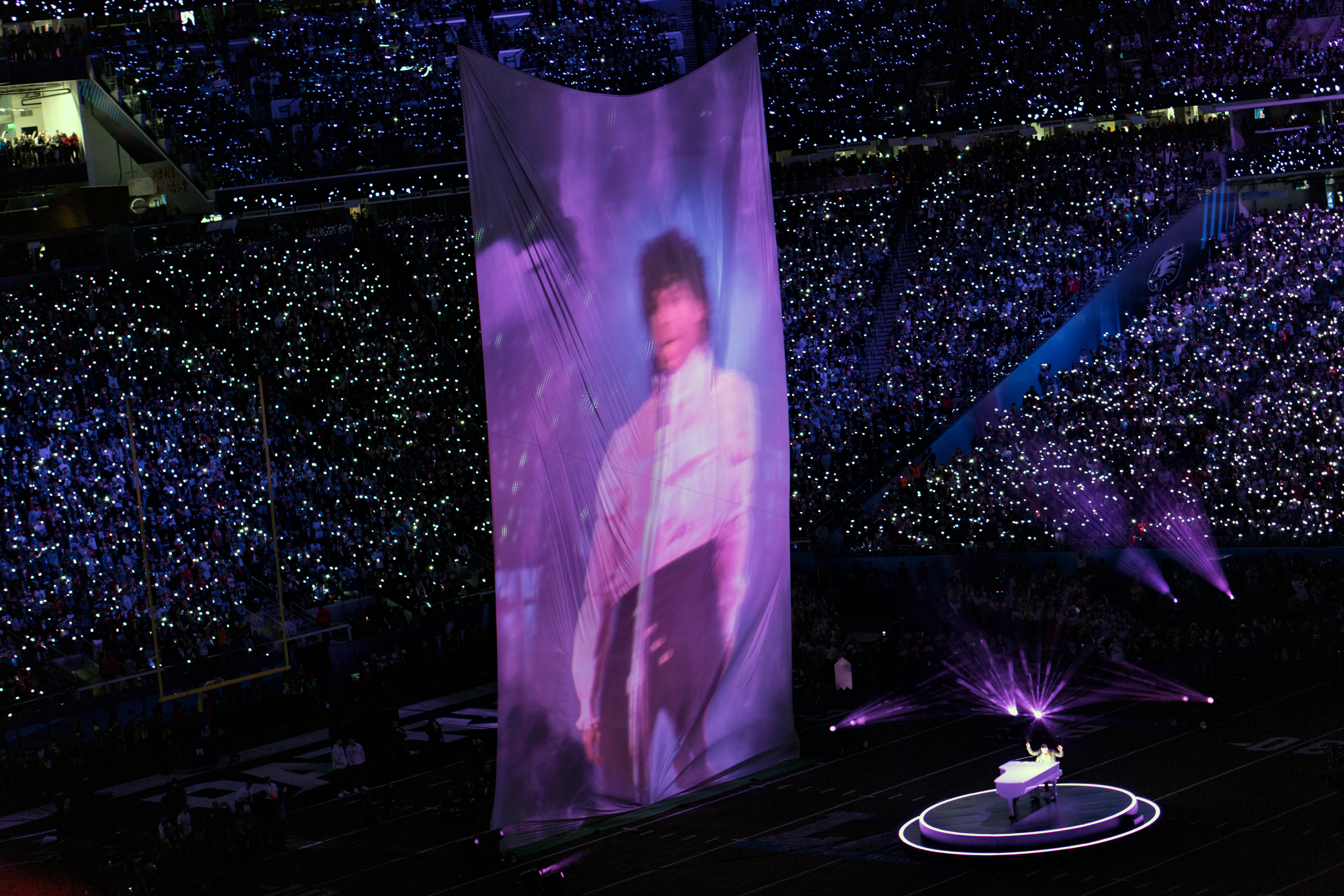
Timberlake performing alongside a video projection of Prince

1. "Filthy"
2. "Rock Your Body"
3. "Señorita"
4. "SexyBack" (with elements of "Supplies")
5. "My Love"
6. "Cry Me a River" (with elements of "Kashmir")
7. "Suit & Tie" (with elements of "Pusher Love Girl") (featuring the University of Minnesota Marching Band)
8. "Until the End of Time"
9. "I Would Die 4 U" (along with a pre-recorded video of Prince, displayed on a projection screen)
10. "Mirrors"
11. "Can't Stop the Feeling!"

== See also ==
- 2018 in American television
