= Supplies (song) =

Single by Justin Timberlake

from the album Man of the Woods
- Released: January 18, 2018
- Genre: R&B; trap
- Length: 3:45
- Label: RCA
- Songwriters: Justin Timberlake; Chad Hugo; Pharrell Williams
- Producers: Justin Timberlake; The Neptunes

Justin Timberlake singles chronology
"Filthy" (2018)	"Supplies" (2018)	"Say Something" (2018)

Music video
- "Supplies" on YouTube

"Supplies" is a song recorded by American singer-songwriter Justin Timberlake for his fifth studio album, Man of the Woods (2018). It was written and produced by Timberlake with Pharrell Williams and Chad Hugo of The Neptunes, and released on 18 January 2018. Its music video was directed by Dave Meyers. The song was serviced to rhythmic radio on January 23, 2018, as the album's second single.

== Production ==
"Supplies" was the second single released from the album Man of the Woods, after the Timbaland- and Danja-produced "Filthy". "Supplies" was produced by Timberlake and The Neptunes. Despite The Neptunes' prolific production on *NSYNC's "Girlfriend", Timberlake's debut album Justified (which spawned a number of successful singles such as "Like I Love You", "Rock Your Body" and "Señorita"), and good relations with Timberlake, "Supplies" is the first solo single by Timberlake to be produced by the duo since 2003's "I'm Lovin' It", following The Neptunes' disputes with Jive Records (whom Timberlake was signed to at the time) over rap-group Clipse.

== Composition ==
"Supplies" is an R&B and trap song, with a steady beat and sitar-like melody with onomatopoeic interjections from Pharrell Williams.

== Music video ==
Directed by Dave Meyers, the song's music video shows a couple living in a dystopia society with hints of the present. The clip starts in a darkened room with an array of television screens showing images of the socio-political climate. Co-star Eiza González interrupts a religious cult ritual, before entering a room full of levitating people with halos on their heads. Timberlake removes a halo from one of the people, causing them to collapse to the floor. Later, Timberlake is seen again in the room with the television screens, with said televisions combusting, before being joined by González in a post-apocalyptic scenario. A group of five children appear, with the duo taking them under their care. One of the children tells the viewer to "die already", and that they are "still asleep". Pharrell Williams, who did the co-production of the song, makes a brief cameo appearance in the video.

The music video on YouTube has received over 35 million views as of April 2023.

== Credits and personnel ==
Credits adapted from Discogs.

- Justin Timberlake – production, vocal production
- Pharrell Williams – production, additional vocals
- Chad Hugo – production
- Andrew Coleman – engineering
- Mike Larson – engineering
- Jon Sher – assistant engineering
- Ben Sedano – assistant engineering
- Elliot Ives – guitar

== Charts ==
Chart (2018)	Peak position
Canada Hot 100 (Billboard)	49
France (SNEP)	128
Germany (GfK)	83
Hungary (Single Top 40)	36
New Zealand Heatseekers (RMNZ)	6
Sweden (Sverigetopplistan)	63
Switzerland (Schweizer Hitparade)	84
UK Singles (Official Charts)	84
US Billboard Hot 100	71
US Rhythmic Airplay (Billboard)	18

== Release history ==
Release dates and formats for "Supplies"
Region	Date	Format(s)	Label	Ref.
Russia	January 31, 2018	Contemporary hit radio	Sony	
