= Trolls (franchise) =

DreamWorks Animation media franchise

- Created by: DreamWorks Animation Studios
- Original work: Trolls
- Owners: DreamWorks Animation (Universal Pictures (Note: 20th Century Fox distributed the first film as part of DreamWorks' distribution deal with the studio. The distribution rights to future Trolls movies would move to Universal Studios following the acquisition; the first to be distributed by the studio was Trolls World Tour (2020).))
- Years: 2016–present

Films and television
- Films: Trolls (2016); Trolls World Tour (2020); Trolls Band Together (2023)
- Animated series: Trolls: The Beat Goes On! (2018–2019); Trolls: TrollsTopia (2020–2022)
- Television specials: Trolls Holiday (2017); Trolls: Holiday in Harmony (2021)

Games
- Video game(s): Trolls: Crazy Party Forest! (2016); Trolls Pop (2019); Trolls Remix Rescue (2023)

Audio
- Soundtracks: Trolls (soundtrack); Trolls World Tour (soundtrack); Trolls Band Together (soundtrack)

Miscellaneous
- Based On: Troll doll (Thomas Dam)

Trolls is an American animated media franchise created by DreamWorks Animation, inspired by the successful line of Troll doll toys created by Thomas Dam. It follows the adventures of a pair of trolls named Poppy and Branch (voiced respectively by Anna Kendrick and Justin Timberlake) as they live among their village of pop-singing trolls. The franchise consists of three feature films, Trolls, released in 2016, Trolls World Tour, released in 2020, and Trolls Band Together, released in 2023. The franchise has been supplemented by two holiday television specials titled Trolls Holiday and Trolls: Holiday in Harmony, and two animated series: Trolls: The Beat Goes On! on Netflix, and Trolls: TrollsTopia on Hulu and Peacock.

== Films ==
Film	U.S. release date	Director(s)	Screenwriter(s)	Story by	Producer(s)
Trolls	November 4, 2016	Mike Mitchell Co-director: Walt Dohrn	Jonathan Aibel and Glenn Berger	Erica Rivinoja	Gina Shay
Trolls World Tour	April 10, 2020	Walt Dohrn Co-director: David P. Smith	Jonathan Aibel, Glenn Berger, Maya Forbes, Wally Wolodarsky and Elizabeth Tippet	Jonathan Aibel and Glenn Berger	Gina Shay
Trolls Band Together	November 17, 2023	Walt Dohrn Co-director: Tim Heitz	Elizabeth Tippet	Elizabeth Tippet	Gina Shay

=== Trolls (2016) ===
Trolls is a 2016 American animated musical comedy film based on the Troll dolls created by Thomas Dam. Mike Mitchell directed the film, with Jonathan Aibel and Glenn Berger serving as the writers. The film is based on a story by Erica Rivinoja. The film features the voices of Anna Kendrick, Justin Timberlake, Christopher Mintz-Plasse, Zooey Deschanel, Christine Baranski, Russell Brand, James Corden, Ron Funches, Jeffrey Tambor, John Cleese and Gwen Stefani. The film follows two trolls who go on a quest to save their village from destruction by the Bergens, creatures who eat Trolls to be happy.

DreamWorks announced plans for a film based on the Troll toyline as early as 2010. This version was to be written by Adam Wilson and Melanie Wilson LaBracio. By 2012, Chloë Grace Moretz had already been cast in the female lead role and Jason Schwartzman was reported to have been offered the male lead. In September 2012, 20th Century Fox and DreamWorks Animation announced that the film with the working title Trolls would be released on June 5, 2015, with Anand Tucker set to direct the film, written by Wallace Wolodarsky and Maya Forbes.

By April 2013, DreamWorks Animation had acquired the intellectual property for the Trolls franchise from the Dam Family and Dam Things. Having "big plans for the franchise," DreamWorks Animation became the exclusive worldwide licensor of the merchandise rights, except for Scandinavia, where Dam Things remains the licensor. In May 2013, the film was pushed back for a year to November 4, 2016. The same month, DreamWorks Animation announced that Mike Mitchell and Erica Rivinoja has been hired as a director and screenplay writer to "reimagine" the film as a musical comedy, which would present the origin of the Trolls' colorful hair. On June 16, 2014, Anna Kendrick joined the cast to voice Poppy, a princess. On September 15, 2015, Deadline Hollywood reported that Justin Timberlake would voice a character named Branch. Timberlake previously worked with DreamWorks Animation as the voice of Arthur "Artie" Pendragon in Shrek the Third in 2007. The full cast announced their respective roles via announcements on Twitter on January 6, 2016.

Trolls premiered on October 8, 2016, at the BFI London Film Festival and was theatrically released in the United States on November 4 by 20th Century Fox and received mostly positive reviews from critics and grossed $346 million worldwide against its $125 million budget. The film received an Academy Award nomination for Best Original Song for "Can't Stop the Feeling!".

=== Trolls World Tour (2020) ===
Trolls World Tour is a 2020 American animated jukebox musical comedy film produced by DreamWorks Animation and distributed by Universal Pictures. The film is directed by Walt Dohrn, produced by Gina Shay, and written by Jonathan Aibel, Glenn Berger, Elizabeth Tippet, Maya Forbes and Wallace Wolodarsky, from a story by Aibel and Berger. The film stars the voices of Anna Kendrick, Justin Timberlake, Rachel Bloom, James Corden, Ron Funches, Kelly Clarkson, Anderson .Paak, Sam Rockwell, George Clinton and Mary J. Blige. It follows Poppy and Branch as they try to stop a rock troll, Queen Barb, who wants to conquer all the troll kingdoms with rock music.

On February 28, 2017, Universal Pictures and DreamWorks Animation announced a sequel to the 2016 film Trolls, with Anna Kendrick and Justin Timberlake reprising their roles as Poppy and Branch, respectively.

In March 2017, podcasters the McElroy brothers began campaigning for roles in the film via a podcast titled "The McElroy Brothers Will Be in Trolls 2". Following the campaign's success, DreamWorks confirmed in September 2018 that the McElroy brothers would make cameo appearances in World Tour.

Sam Rockwell, Chance the Rapper, Anthony Ramos, Jamie Dornan and Flula Borg were added to the cast in May 2018. Corden, Icona Pop, Funches, and Nayyar returned to reprise their roles. On June 12, 2018, the film was retitled as Trolls World Tour. In October 2018, it was confirmed that Kelly Clarkson had joined the cast, and will perform an original song. In June 2019, along with promotional posters, new cast members have been announced, which include: J Balvin, Mary J. Blige, Rachel Bloom, George Clinton, Kenan Thompson, Ester Dean, Anderson .Paak and Gustavo Dudamel.

Universal Pictures originally planned to release Trolls World Tour theatrically in the United States on April 10, 2020. It was later pushed back to April 17, 2020. Following the delay of No Time to Die, it was once again pushed up to the original April 10 release date. On March 17, Universal announced that the film would be released simultaneously in theaters and through Premium Video on Demand on April 10 in the United States and Canada due to the COVID-19 pandemic. As the pandemic receded, the film was released back in regular theaters.

=== Trolls Band Together (2023) ===
Trolls Band Together is a 2023 American animated musical comedy film produced by DreamWorks Animation and distributed by Universal Pictures. Serving as the sequel to Trolls World Tour, most of the original voice cast reprise their voice roles from its predecessors, with newcomers Eric André, Kid Cudi, Daveed Diggs, Troye Sivan, Camila Cabello, Amy Schumer, Andrew Rannells, RuPaul, and Zosia Mamet joining the ensemble voice cast. The film follows Branch embarking on a rescue mission to rescue Floyd with his former boy band of brothers while Poppy reunites with a long-lost sibling of her own.

On November 22, 2021, it was announced that a third Trolls film would be released in theaters on November 17, 2023. Anna Kendrick and Justin Timberlake are confirmed to reprise their respective voice roles as Poppy and Branch. On March 6, 2023, Theodore Shapiro was confirmed to compose the score for Trolls Band Together, returning from its predecessor. On March 28, 2023, with the release of the first official trailer, new cast members of the film were officially announced, including Eric André, Kid Cudi, Daveed Diggs, Troye Sivan, Camila Cabello, Amy Schumer, Andrew Rannells, RuPaul, and Zosia Mamet. Walt Dohrn returned to direct the third film after doing so in its predecessor, while Gina Shay returned to serve as producer. Tim Heitz was later announced as co-director. The same day of these announcements, DreamWorks Animation revealed the official title, Trolls Band Together.

According to Shay, the idea for the film came about right after Trolls (2016). Although Trolls Band Together was predominantly CGI animation, the film includes some 2D animation sequences done by Titmouse, Inc., with animation styles inspired by Yellow Submarine (1968) and Fantasia (1940). On September 14, 2023, following the release of the second trailer, DreamWorks announced that NSYNC would perform an original song for the film, called "Better Place", marking the group's first song in 22 years.

== Other media ==
=== Short films ===
==== Dress Up (2017) ====
A promotional short for Trolls Holiday, Dress Up follows Biggie playing dress-up with Mr. Dinkles only for Poppy to walk in on their playtime.

==== Together (2017) ====
A promotional short for Trolls Holiday, Together features Satin and Chenile managing being stuck together while having different thoughts on what to do next.

==== Trolla-Palooza Tour (2017) ====
A promotional short for Trolls Holiday, Trolla-Palooza Tour focuses on Branch as he copes with the idea that his musical talent isn't being noticed while playing on Tour with his friends.

==== Tiny Diamond Goes Back To School (2020) ====
Tiny Diamond Goes Back To School is a traditionally-animated short film included on the home media releases of Trolls World Tour. Taking place after the events of the film, the short follows Guy Diamond's son, Tiny Diamond as he struggles to find the perfect outfit for his new School year.

==== It Takes Three (2024) ====
It Takes Three is a CG-and-traditionally-animated short film included on the home media releases of Trolls Band Together. Taking place after the events of the film, the short follows Poppy, Viva, and Tiny Diamond as they get sucked into the Hustle-verse, only to discover that it is devoid of hustle. The trio decide to sing their way out, hopefully generating enough harmony to re-ignite the Hustle-verse and escape.

=== Television specials ===
Film	U.S. release date	Director	Screenwriter	Executive Producers
Trolls Holiday	November 24, 2017	Joel Crawford	Josh Bycel and Jonathan Fener	Mike Mitchell, Walt Dohrn, and Gina Shay
Trolls: Holiday in Harmony	November 26, 2021	Sean Charmatz and Tim Heitz	Sean Charmatz and Tim Heitz	Walt Dohrn and Gina Shay

==== Trolls Holiday (2017) ====
Trolls Holiday is a Christmas special that premiered on NBC. The half-hour Christmas special was directed by Joel Crawford and produced by DreamWorks Animation. The main cast all reprised their roles, as their respective characters, most notably Anna Kendrick, Justin Timberlake, Zooey Deschanel, and Icona Pop as Poppy, Branch, Bridget, and Satin (Aino Jawo) & Chenille (Caroline Hjelt), respectively.

The special premiered on November 24, 2017 (Black Friday). The premiere of Trolls Holiday attracted 5.36 million viewers, with a 1.5 in the 18-49 demographic. It is the second most watched program of the night, behind How the Grinch Stole Christmas!, with 5.78 million viewers.

==== Trolls: Holiday in Harmony (2021) ====
Trolls: Holiday in Harmony is the second Christmas special that premiered on NBC. The half-hour Christmas special was written and directed by Sean Charmatz and Tim Heitz and produced by DreamWorks Animation.

The special premiered on November 26, 2021.

=== Television series ===
Series	Seasons	Episodes	First released	Last released	Showrunner(s)	Network(s)
Trolls: The Beat Goes On!	8	52	January 19, 2018	November 22, 2019	Matthew Beans, Hannah Friedman, Sam Friedman	Netflix
Trolls: TrollsTopia	7	52	November 19, 2020	August 11, 2022	Matthew Beans	Hulu/Peacock

==== Trolls: The Beat Goes On! ====
Trolls: The Beat Goes On! is an American animated web television series based on the film Trolls. The series was released on Netflix on January 19, 2018, exclusively in the United States, Canada, Latin America, United Kingdom, Ireland, Australia, New Zealand, the Nordics, Benelux, and France.

Amanda Leighton, Skylar Astin, Kari Wahlgren, Sam Lerner, David Kaye, David Fynn, Sean T. Krishnan, Kevin Michael Richardson, and Fryda Wolff provide the new voices for Princess Poppy, Branch, Bridget, King Gristle, King Peppy, Biggie and Mr. Dinkles, Guy Diamond, Smidge, DJ Suki and Satin & Chenille for this series respectively, with Ron Funches, and Walt Dohrn reprising their roles of Cooper, and Cloud Guy from the films, respectively.

Shortly after the release of the first season, it was confirmed that there would be a second season, which was released on March 9 and consists of seven episodes. The third season was released on August 24, 2018, the fourth season on November 2, 2018, the fifth season on January 18, 2019, the sixth season on April 9, 2019, the seventh season on August 27, 2019, and the eighth and final season was released on November 22, 2019.

==== Trolls: TrollsTopia ====
On January 17, 2020, DreamWorks announced a new Trolls TV series, titled Trolls: TrollsTopia, to be distributed exclusively on both Hulu and Peacock. The series was originally scheduled to be released in late 2020.

Due to the effects of COVID-19 on Peacock's original release schedule, many of the planned originals, including this series, have been delayed. Hulu had not announced any delays and would release the series on schedule. The release date for the series on Hulu was confirmed to be November 19, 2020. The series was released on Hulu and Peacock on November 19, 2020. Following the events of Trolls World Tour, the show focuses on Poppy building TrollsTopia, a community where all the Trolls tribes can live together. It features the cast of the previous series reprising their roles, with Kenan Thompson, Ron Funches, and Walt Dohrn reprising their roles of Tiny Diamond, Cooper, and Cloud Guy from the films, respectively.

A first season was released on November 19, 2020. A second season was released on March 18, 2021. A third season was released on June 10, 2021. A fourth season was released on September 2, 2021. A fifth season was released on December 9, 2021. A sixth season was released on February 17, 2022. A seventh and final season was released on August 11, 2022.

=== Video games ===
Prior to the release of Trolls Band Together, a video game titled Trolls: Remix Rescue was released on October 27, 2023, by DreamWorks Animation and GameMill Entertainment on PlayStation 4, PlayStation 5, Xbox One, Xbox Series X and Series S, Nintendo Switch, and PC. In this game, which takes place after the events of Trolls World Tour, Poppy, Branch, and their friends must embark on a quest to save the Troll Kingdom from Chaz the Smooth Jazz Troll when he tries to take over the place by hypnotizing the residents with his saxophone.

=== Web series ===
Trolls: Fun Fair Surprise is a mini series revolving around Poppy, Branch, Viva and Tiny Diamond as they perform their own versions of different songs in music video format at a boardwalk carnival. Aside from music videos, this series also has episodes that involve the four characters’ experiences at the carnival.

== Cast and characters ==
List indicators

This section includes characters who have appeared in more than one installment.

- An empty grey cell indicates the character was not in the film.
- ^{A} indicates an appearance through archival footage or audio.
- ^{A} indicates an appearance through previously recorded material.
- ^{Y} indicates an appearance as a younger version of the character.

Characters
Characters	Films			Short films					Television specials		Television series		Video game	Web series
Characters	Trolls	Trolls World Tour	Trolls Band Together	Dress Up	Together	Trolla-Palooza Tour	Tiny Diamond Goes Back To School	It Takes Three	Trolls Holiday	Trolls: Holiday in Harmony	Trolls: The Beat Goes On!	Trolls: TrollsTopia	Trolls: Remix Rescue	Trolls: Fun Fair Surprise
Poppy	Anna Kendrick	Anna Kendrick	Anna Kendrick	Anna Kendrick		Anna Kendrick		Anna Kendrick	Anna Kendrick	Anna Kendrick	Amanda Leighton	Amanda Leighton	Amanda Leighton	Amanda Leighton
Poppy	Iris Dohrn^{Y}	Anna Kendrick	Anna Kendrick	Anna Kendrick		Anna Kendrick		Anna Kendrick	Anna Kendrick	Anna Kendrick	Amanda Leighton	Amanda Leighton	Amanda Leighton	Amanda Leighton
Branch	Justin Timberlake	Justin Timberlake	Justin Timberlake			Justin Timberlake			Justin Timberlake	Justin Timberlake	Skylar Astin	Skylar Astin	James Arnold Taylor	James Arnold Taylor
Branch	Liam Henry^{Y}	Justin Timberlake	Iris Dohrn^{Y}			Justin Timberlake			Justin Timberlake	Justin Timberlake	Skylar Astin	Skylar Astin	James Arnold Taylor	James Arnold Taylor
King Gristle Jr.	Christopher Mintz-Plasse	Christopher Mintz-Plasse	Christopher Mintz-Plasse						Christopher Mintz-Plasse		Sam Lerner	Sam Lerner		
Bridget	Zooey Deschanel	Zooey Deschanel	Zooey Deschanel						Zooey Deschanel	Photograph	Kari Wahlgren		Eliza Jane Schneider	
Biggie	James Corden	James Corden	David Fynn	James Corden		Character is mute	James Corden		James Corden		David Fynn	David Fynn	David Fynn	
Cooper	Ron Funches	Ron Funches	Ron Funches		Ron Funches	Ron Funches			Ron Funches	Ron Funches	Ron Funches	Ron Funches	Ron Funches	
Guy Diamond	Kunal Nayyar	Kunal Nayyar	Kunal Nayyar			Kunal Nayyar	Kunal Nayyar		Kunal Nayyar	Kunal Nayyar	Sean T. Krishnan	Sean T. Krishnan	Manish Dayal	
Satin	Aino Jawo	Aino Jawo	Aino Jawo		Aino Jawo	Character is mute			Aino Jawo	Silent cameo	Fryda Wolff	Fryda Wolff	Fryda Wolff	
Chenille	Caroline Hjelt	Caroline Hjelt	Caroline Hjelt		Caroline Hjelt	Character is mute			Caroline Hjelt	Silent cameo	Fryda Wolff	Fryda Wolff	Fryda Wolff	
Smidge	Walt Dohrn	Walt Dohrn		Photograph		Character is mute			Walt Dohrn		Kevin Michael Richardson	Kevin Michael Richardson		
Mr. Dinkles	Walt Dohrn	Kevin Michael Richardson	Kevin Michael Richardson	Kevin Michael Richardson		Kevin Michael Richardson	Walt Dohrn^{A}		Kevin Michael Richardson	Walt Dohrn	David Fynn	Walt Dohrn	Walt Dohrn	
Mr. Dinkles	Walt Dohrn	Walt Dohrn	Kevin Michael Richardson	Kevin Michael Richardson		Kevin Michael Richardson	Walt Dohrn^{A}		Kevin Michael Richardson	Walt Dohrn	David Fynn	Walt Dohrn	Walt Dohrn	
Cloud Guy	Walt Dohrn	Walt Dohrn	Walt Dohrn			Walt Dohrn			Walt Dohrn	Walt Dohrn	Walt Dohrn	Walt Dohrn	Walt Dohrn	
Fuzzbert	Walt Dohrn	Walt Dohrn				Character is mute			Silent role	Silent role	Walt Dorhn	Silent role		
King Peppy	Jeffrey Tambor	Walt Dohrn	Walt Dohrn								David Kaye	David Kaye		
Creek	Russell Brand										Matt Lowe	Matt Lowe		
DJ Suki	Gwen Stefani										Fryda Wolff	Fryda Wolff		
Harper	Quvenzhané Wallis										Kari Wahlgren	Kari Wahlgren		
Chad	Mike Mitchell								Mike Mitchell	Archive footage	Kevin Michael Ricardson			
Todd	Curtis Stone								Curtis Stone	Archive footage	Kevin Michael Ricardson			
Grandma Rosiepuff	GloZell Green		GloZell Green									GloZell Green		
Queen Barbara "Barb"		Rachel Bloom								Rachel Bloom			Becky Robinson	
Prince Darnell		Anderson .Paak	Anderson .Paak							Anderson .Paak				
King Trollex		Anthony Ramos								Anthony Ramos		Anthony Lee Medina		
Delta Dawn		Kelly Clarkson								Jenny Mermelstein				
Tiny Diamond		Kenan Thompson	Kenan Thompson				Kenan Thompson	Kenan Thompson		Kenan Thompson		Kenan Thompson	Tru Valentino	Tru Valentino
Riff		Karan Soni								Karan Soni				
Chazz		Jamie Dornan										Sam Haft	Sam Haft	
Sheila B		Da'Vine Joy Randolph								Da'Vine Joy Randolph				
Legsly		Ester Dean								Ester Dean				
Pennywhistle		Charlyne Yi											Charlyne Yi	
John Dory			Eric Andre										Kyle Chapple	
Floyd			Troye Sivan										Tyler Shamy	
Viva			Camila Cabello					Camila Cabello					Sarah-Nicole Robles	Natalia del Riego
Val Thundershock										Lauren Mayhew		Lauren Mayhew		
Holly Darlin'										Megan Hilty		Megan Hilty		

== Additional crew ==
=== Films ===
Film	Detail					
Film	Executive Producer(s)	Composer	Editor	Production companies	Distributor	Running time
Trolls	Dannie Festa	Christophe Beck	Nick Fletcher	DreamWorks Animation	20th Century Fox	1hr 33mins
Trolls World Tour	Dannie Festa	Theodore Shapiro	Nick Fletcher	DreamWorks Animation	Universal Pictures	1hr 31mins
Trolls Band Together	Jonathan Aibel; Glenn Berger; Dannie Festa	Theodore Shapiro	Nick Fletcher	DreamWorks Animation	Universal Pictures	1hr 32mins

=== Television series ===
TV series	Detail				
TV series	Composer	Production companies	Distributor	Network	Running time
Trolls: The Beat Goes On!	Alexander Geringas, Alana Da Fonseca	DreamWorks Animation Television	NBCUniversal Television and Streaming, Netflix	Netflix	22 minutes per episode
Trolls: TrollsTopia	Alexander Geringas	DreamWorks Animation Television	NBCUniversal Television and Streaming	Hulu/Peacock	22 minutes per episode

=== Television specials ===
TV special	Detail				
TV special	Composer	Production companies	Distributor	Network	Running time
Trolls Holiday	Jeff Morrow	DreamWorks Animation	NBCUniversal Television and Streaming	NBC	30mins
Trolls: Holiday in Harmony	Joseph Shirley	DreamWorks Animation	NBCUniversal Television and Streaming	NBC	30mins

== Reception ==
=== Box office performance ===
Film	Release date	Box office gross			Box office ranking		Budget	Ref.
Film	Release date	North America	Other territories	Worldwide	North America	Worldwide	Budget	Ref.
Trolls	November 4, 2016	$153,707,064	$193,157,398	$346,864,462	#361	#404	$125 million	
Trolls World Tour	April 10, 2020	$450,000	$48,846,485	$49,276,818	N/A	#2,909	$110 million	
Trolls Band Together	November 17, 2023	$103,974,820	$106,677,014	$210,651,834	#763	#868	$95 million	
Totals		$258,131,884	$348,680,897	$606,793,114			$330 million	

=== Critical and public response ===
The Trolls movies have received generally mixed-to-positive reception from critics. Critics have praised the upbeat setting and music, while their plots and some of the characters were criticized.

Critical and public response of Trolls films
Film	Critical		Public	
Film	Rotten Tomatoes	Metacritic	CinemaScore	PostTrak
Trolls	76% (161 reviews)	55 (32 reviews)	A	80%
Trolls World Tour	72% (160 reviews)	51 (36 reviews)	—N/a	—N/a
Trolls Band Together	64% (88 reviews)	53 (13 reviews)	A	85%

== Attractions ==
Universal Studios Florida's DreamWorks Land includes the ride Trolls Trollercoaster, Poppy's Playground, the kiosk Trolls Treats, and the store High Five Hideaway.

Universal Kids Resort includes a themed land based on the Trolls franchise.

== Merchandise ==
The Trolls franchise made $5 billion in retail sales by 2005.
