= Trolls (film) =

2016 animated film by Mike Mitchell

- Theatrical release poster
- Directed by: Mike Mitchell
- Screenplay by: Jonathan Aibel; Glenn Berger
- Story by: Erica Rivinoja
- Based on: Good Luck Trolls by Thomas Dam
- Produced by: Gina Shay
- Starring: Anna Kendrick; Justin Timberlake; Zooey Deschanel; Christopher Mintz-Plasse; Christine Baranski; Russell Brand; James Corden; Jeffrey Tambor; Ron Funches; Icona Pop; Kunal Nayyar; Quvenzhané Wallis; John Cleese; Gwen Stefani
- Edited by: Nick Fletcher
- Music by: Christophe Beck
- Production company: DreamWorks Animation
- Distributed by: 20th Century Fox (Note: In 2018, the film's distribution rights were transferred from 20th Century Fox to Universal Pictures, following NBCUniversal's acquisition of DreamWorks Animation in 2016.)
- Release dates: October 8, 2016 (BFI London Film Festival); November 4, 2016 (United States)
- Running time: 92 minutes
- Country: United States
- Language: English
- Budget: $125 million
- Box office: $347 million

Trolls is a 2016 American animated musical comedy film produced by DreamWorks Animation, based on the Good Luck Trolls doll line. The film was directed by Mike Mitchell, written by Jonathan Aibel and Glenn Berger, and stars the voices of Anna Kendrick, Justin Timberlake, Zooey Deschanel, Christopher Mintz-Plasse, Christine Baranski, Russell Brand, James Corden, Jeffrey Tambor, Ron Funches, Icona Pop, Kunal Nayyar, Quvenzhané Wallis, John Cleese, and Gwen Stefani. The film follows two trolls, Poppy (Kendrick) and Branch (Timberlake), who go on a quest to rescue their village from destruction by the Bergens, giant creatures who eat Trolls.

Trolls premiered at the BFI London Film Festival on October 8, 2016, and was theatrically released in the United States on November 4 by 20th Century Fox. The film received mostly positive reviews from critics and grossed $347 million against a $125 million budget. It received an Academy Award nomination for Best Original Song for "Can't Stop the Feeling!".

The film launched a franchise, which included two television specials, Trolls Holiday (2017) and Trolls: Holiday in Harmony (2021), two television series, Trolls: The Beat Goes On! (2018–2019) and Trolls: TrollsTopia (2020–2022), two sequels, Trolls World Tour (2020) and Trolls Band Together (2023), and six short films.

== Plot ==
Trolls are small, colorful, perpetually happy creatures who like to sing, dance and hug all day. They are preyed upon by the large, hideous and miserable Bergens, who believe they can only feel happy by consuming a Troll. The Bergens imprison the Trolls in a caged tree, eating them annually on a special occasion called "Trollstice". On the year Bergen Prince Gristle Jr., son of King Gristle Sr., is due to eat his first Troll, the chef in charge of the ceremony discovers that the Trolls, led by King Peppy, have managed to escape. Gristle Sr. banishes Chef from Bergen Town, and she vows to find the Trolls, secretly plotting to overthrow the monarchy as revenge.

Twenty years later, Peppy's daughter Princess Poppy organizes a gigantic party to celebrate the anniversary of their escape. A serious, gray Troll named Branch warns that this could expose their home, though everyone ignores him. However, his forebodings are justified when Chef, the remaining Bergen, who spent the last twenty years searching for the Trolls, notices the party fireworks from her hideout, follows them to Troll Village and kidnaps Poppy's friends, including her crush, a "zen" Troll named Creek. While the rest of the Trolls take refuge in Branch's bunker uninvited, Poppy sets off alone to rescue her friends. Getting into several potentially deadly situations, Poppy is finally rescued by Branch, who thinks her quest is hopeless and only followed her to escape his crowded bunker.

Encountering further challenges, Poppy and Branch meet a mischievous Cloud Guy, who leads them into Bergen Town. They sneak into the Bergen castle, currently with Gristle Jr. as King, witnessing Chef apparently feeding Creek to Gristle, but Poppy still holds out hope that Creek survived. They find the other captives being guarded by a young scullery maid named Bridget, who is secretly in love with Gristle. Learning this, the Trolls agree to help her get a date in exchange for her help to ascertain whether Creek is still alive. However, Branch refuses to sing along with the others in the ensuing musical number, revealing that when he was younger, his loud singing inadvertently attracted Chef to his home, who captured his grandmother Rosiepuff. Branch's guilt caused his colors to fade to gray, and he swore never to sing again.

The Trolls use their powers to disguise Bridget as "Lady Glittersparkles", and she and Gristle go on a date at a roller rink/arcade restaurant. During the date, Poppy spots Creek being held captive inside a jewel on Gristle's mantle. Afterwards, the Trolls leave Bridget and go to rescue Creek, but are all captured by Chef when Creek sells them out in exchange for his own life being spared. Creek steals a horrified Poppy's cowbell and uses it to lure the rest of the Trolls out of hiding. They are gathered by the Chef, who prepares to serve them to the hungry Bergens in a large cooking pot. Blaming herself for the situation, Poppy becomes embittered, and her colors turn to gray. Saddened, the other Trolls lose their colors as well.

However, Branch, the only Troll who has not given up, begins singing "True Colors" in an attempt to comfort the despairing Trolls; both his and Poppy's colors return, followed by those of the other Trolls. Bridget, grateful to the Trolls for helping her, secretly releases them from the pot while Chef is not looking. Poppy refuses to let Bridget be punished for their escape, so she and the Trolls return to Bergen Town, reveal Bridget's true identity to the Bergens, and explain that she and Gristle are happily in love with each other, showing the rest of the Bergens that they can find happiness within themselves without having to eat a Troll. The two sides celebrate together in song, ending their feud, while Chef, who refuses to accept the peace, is banished from Bergen Town with Creek on a flaming serving cart, and King Peppy crowns his daughter the queen of the Trolls. Chef and Creek roll to a stop on their cart in the wilderness, only to be devoured by a hill-like predator.

== Voice cast ==
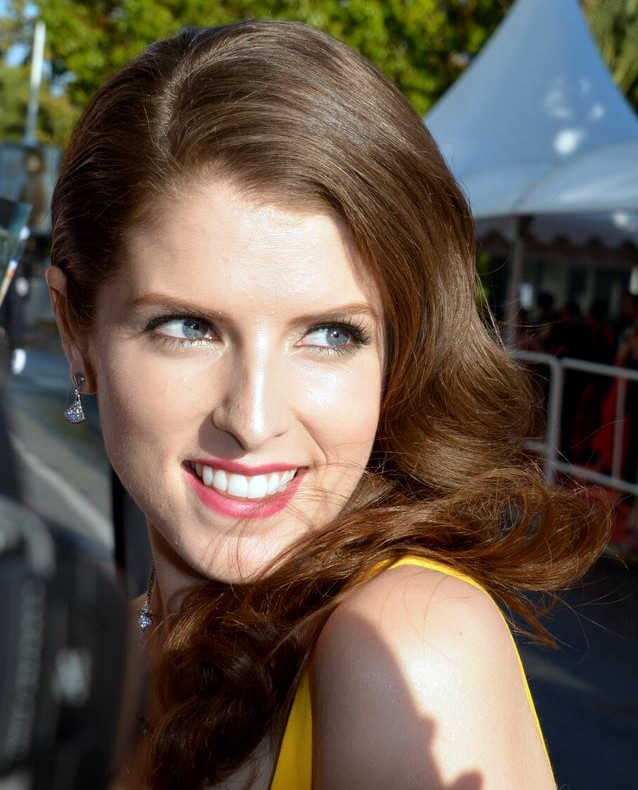
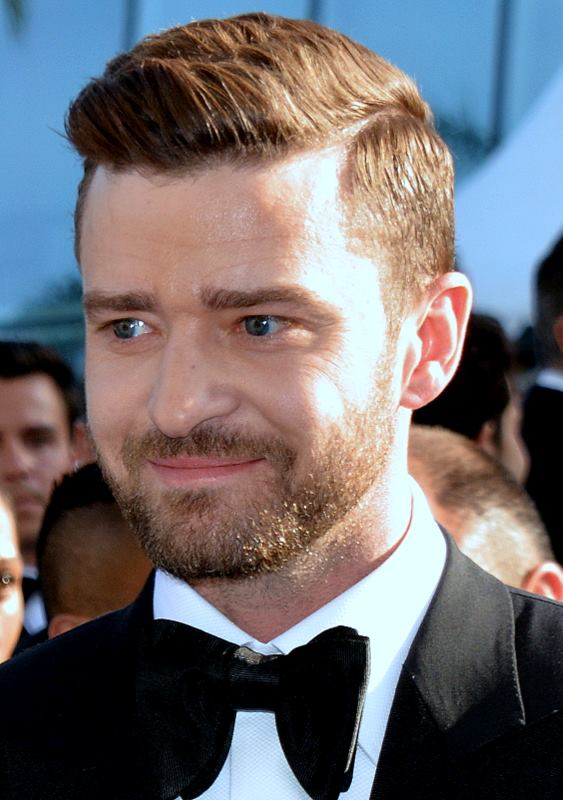
Anna Kendrick (Poppy) and Justin Timberlake (Branch) at the film's preview at the 2016 Cannes Film Festival
- Anna Kendrick as Poppy, the princess the Trolls
- Justin Timberlake as Branch, a survivalist Troll
- Zooey Deschanel as Bridget, a scullery maid to Chef
- Christopher Mintz-Plasse as King Gristle, son of King Gristle Sr., and the second King of the Bergens
- Christine Baranski as Chef, the chef of the Bergens
- Russell Brand as Creek, a "zen" troll
- Gwen Stefani as DJ Suki, a Troll who uses DJ equipment made of insects
- John Cleese as King Gristle Sr., Prince Gristle's father and the first King of the Bergens
- James Corden as Biggie, owner of Mr. Dinkles
- Jeffrey Tambor as King Peppy, the king of the Trolls and Poppy's father
- Ron Funches as Cooper, a Troll who can walk on all fours
- Icona Pop as Satin and Chenille, twin Trolls with a flair for fashion design who are conjoined by their hair
- Kunal Nayyar as Guy Diamond, a glittery Troll
- Quvenzhané Wallis as Harper, a Troll artist
- Walt Dohrn as:
  - Smidge, a small and strong female Troll
  - Fuzzbert, a Troll whose legs are the only thing visible besides his hair
  - Cloud Guy, an anthropomorphic cloud
  - Mr. Dinkles, Biggie's pet stuffed worm
- Rhys Darby as Bibbly, a Bergen shopkeeper of the Bib Store
- Meg DeAngelis as Moxie Dewdrop, a dancing Troll
  - Connie Glynn voices the character in the UK version
- GloZell as Grandma Rosiepuff, Branch's late grandmother
  - Dami Im voices the character in the Australian version
  - Susanna Reid voices the character in the UK version
- Kandee Johnson as Mandy Sparkledust, a Troll who designs and repairs treasures
  - Abbey Clancy voices the character in the UK version
- Grace Helbig as Cookie Sugarloaf, one of the Trolls
  - Carrie Hope Fletcher voices the character in the UK version.
- Mike Mitchell and Curtis Stone as Chad and Todd, two royal guards that work for the Bergen Royal Family

== Production ==
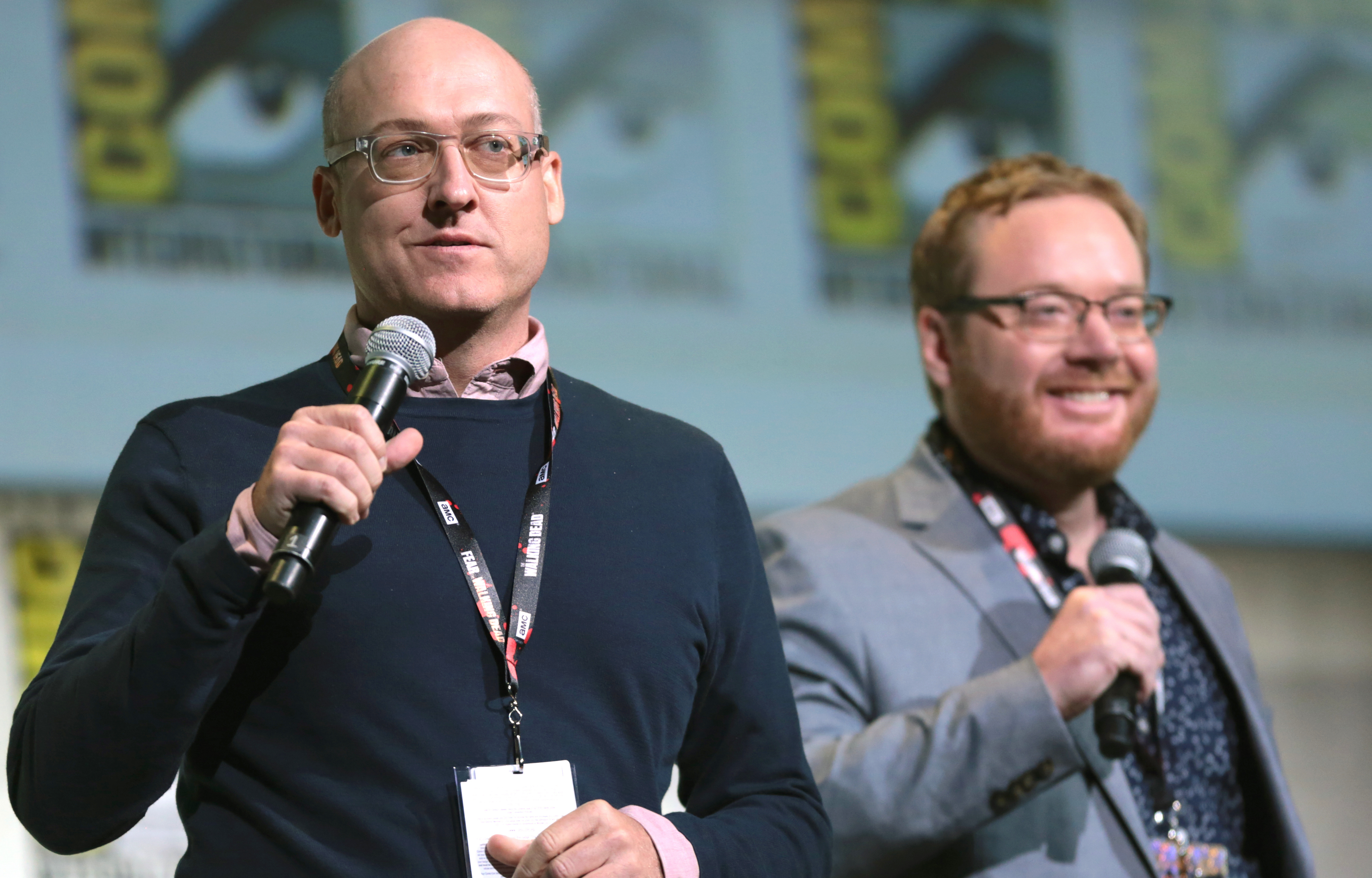
Director Mike Mitchell and co-director Walt Dohrn presented footage from the film at the 2016 San Diego Comic-Con.

DreamWorks announced plans for a film based on the Troll toyline as early as 2010. This version was to be written by Adam Wilson and Melanie Wilson LaBracio. By 2012, Chloë Grace Moretz had already been cast in the female lead role and Jason Schwartzman was reported to have been offered the male lead. In September 2012, 20th Century Fox and DreamWorks Animation announced that the film with the working title Trolls would be released on June 5, 2015, with Anand Tucker set to direct the film, written by Wallace Wolodarsky and Maya Forbes.

By April 2013, DreamWorks Animation had acquired the intellectual property for the Trolls franchise from the Dam Family and Dam Things. Having "big plans for the franchise," DreamWorks Animation became the exclusive worldwide licensor of the merchandise rights, except for Scandinavia, where Dam Things remains the licensor. In May 2013, the film was pushed back for a year to November 4, 2016. The same month, DreamWorks Animation announced that Mike Mitchell and Erica Rivinoja had been hired as a director and screenplay writer to "reimagine" the film as a musical comedy, which would present the origin of the Trolls' colorful hair.

Story artist Joel Crawford, who previously worked with Mitchell on Shrek Forever After (2010), brought on animator Januel Mercado to the production team of Trolls to work on storyboards due to Mercado's enthusiasm for the project, with the two having previously become best friends during production on Kung Fu Panda 2 (2011).

=== Casting ===
On June 16, 2014, Anna Kendrick joined the cast to voice Poppy, a princess. On September 15, 2015, Deadline Hollywood reported that Justin Timberlake would voice a character named Branch. Timberlake previously worked with DreamWorks Animation as the voice of Arthur "Artie" Pendragon in Shrek the Third in 2007. The full cast announced their respective roles via announcements on Twitter on January 6, 2016.

== Music ==
Justin Timberlake served as an executive producer for the film's music and released the original song "Can't Stop the Feeling!" in conjunction with "Hello Darkness" on May 6, 2016. The song reached No. 1 in the official charts of 17 countries, including the United States and Canada. In addition to Timberlake, the rest of the cast contributed to the film's soundtrack, which also features guest appearances from Earth, Wind & Fire and Ariana Grande. The soundtrack album was certified Platinum by the Recording Industry Association of America and the Australian Recording Industry Association.

== Release ==
=== Premiere ===
The film's opening premiere opened at the BFI London Film Festival Opening Celebration on October 8, 2016, as a special BFI presentation, and was theatrically released on November 4, 2016, in the United States by 20th Century Fox, and in the United Kingdom at an earlier date of October 15, 2016.

=== Marketing ===
The first teaser trailer for Trolls was officially unveiled online on January 28, 2016. The following day, it would make its theatrical debut with the opening of Kung Fu Panda 3. On June 29, 2016, a second trailer was then released online.

DreamWorks spent an estimated $105 million promoting the film.

=== Home media ===
Trolls was released on Digital HD on January 24, 2017, and on DVD and Blu-ray by 20th Century Fox Home Entertainment on February 7, 2017. The film topped the home video sales chart for two consecutive weeks. The film was also released in a three-movie pack alongside its sequels Trolls World Tour and Trolls Band Together on DVD and Blu-ray by Universal Pictures Home Entertainment and Studio Distribution Services on January 16, 2024.

== Reception ==
=== Box office ===
Trolls grossed $153.9 million in the US and Canada and $193.2 million in other countries for a worldwide total of $347 million, against a budget of $125 million. Deadline Hollywood calculated the film made a net profit of $19 million, when factoring together all expenses and revenues.

In the United States and Canada, Trolls was released alongside the releases of Doctor Strange and Hacksaw Ridge, and was projected to gross $35–40 million from 4,060 theaters in its opening weekend. On its first day, the film grossed $12.3 million (including $900,000 made from Thursday night previews). It went on to open to $46.5 million, finishing second at the box office behind Doctor Strange.

=== Critical response ===
On review aggregator website Rotten Tomatoes, the film holds an approval rating of 76% based on 165 reviews, with an average rating of 6.30/10. The site's critical consensus reads: "Trolls brings its instantly recognizable characters to the big screen in a colorful adventure that, while geared toward the younger set, isn't without rewards for parents." On Metacritic, which assigns a normalized rating, the film has a score of 55 out of 100, based on 32 critics, indicating "mixed or average reviews". Audiences polled by CinemaScore gave the film an average grade of "A" on an A+ to F scale, while PostTrak reported filmgoers gave it an 80% overall positive score.

Lindsey Bahr of Associated Press gave the film a positive review and said, "Ultimately, the 'get happy' moral of the story, while trite compared to something like Inside Out, is sufficiently sweet enough for its audience. Did you expect more from a piece of candy?" Bill Zwecker of Chicago Sun-Times gave the film three-and-a-half stars out of four and said, "You simply will walk out – or perhaps dance out – of the theater feeling very happy yourself." Andy Webster of The New York Times said, "Exuberant, busy and sometimes funny, DreamWorks Animation's Trolls is determined to amuse."

Michael Rechtshaffen, writing for The Hollywood Reporter, called the film "an admittedly vibrant-looking but awfully recognizable animated musical comedy concoction." Alonso Duralde of TheWrap said the film "combines the barely-there characterization and irritating cutesiness of The Smurfs with the hideous character design and awful pop covers of Strange Magic." Betsy Bozdech of Common Sense Media gave the movie 4 stars. She said, "Make no mistake: Kids are going to love this movie. Trolls is cute, it's colorful, it has tons of catchy songs, and the messages are positive and easy to understand (happiness is inside everyone, if you know where/how to find it, and you shouldn't have to change who you are to get someone to like you)."

=== Accolades ===
Trolls was nominated at the 89th Academy Awards for Best Original Song for "Can't Stop the Feeling!" and at the 74th Golden Globe Awards for Best Original Song for the same song. However, "Can't Stop the Feeling" did win at the 59th Annual Grammy Awards for Best Song Written for Visual Media.

List of awards and nominations
Award	Date of ceremony	Category	Recipient(s)	Result	Ref.
Academy Awards	February 26, 2017	Best Original Song	"Can't Stop the Feeling!" – Max Martin, Shellback and Justin Timberlake	Nominated	
American Music Awards	November 19, 2017	Top Soundtrack	Trolls: Original Motion Picture Soundtrack	Nominated	
Annie Awards	February 4, 2017	Outstanding Achievement, Character Design in an Animated Feature Production	Tim Lamb and Craig Kellman	Nominated	
Annie Awards	February 4, 2017	Outstanding Achievement, Production Design in an Animated Feature Production	Kendal Cronkhite and Tim Lamb	Nominated	
Annie Awards	February 4, 2017	Outstanding Achievement, Storyboarding in an Animated Feature Production	Claire Morrissey	Nominated	
Annie Awards	February 4, 2017	Outstanding Achievement, Voice Acting in an Animated Feature Production	Zooey Deschanel	Nominated	
Billboard Music Awards	May 21, 2017	Top Soundtrack/Cast Album	Trolls: Original Motion Picture Soundtrack	Nominated	
Critics' Choice Awards	December 11, 2016	Best Animated Feature	Trolls	Nominated	
Critics' Choice Awards	December 11, 2016	Best Song	"Can't Stop the Feeling!" – Max Martin, Shellback and Justin Timberlake	Nominated	
Golden Globe Awards	January 8, 2017	Best Original Song	"Can't Stop the Feeling!" – Max Martin, Shellback and Justin Timberlake	Nominated	
Grammy Awards	February 12, 2017	Best Song Written for Visual Media	"Can't Stop the Feeling!" – Max Martin, Shellback and Justin Timberlake	Won	
Guild of Music Supervisors Awards	February 16, 2017	Best Song/Recording Created for a Film	"Can't Stop the Feeling!" – Max Martin, Shellback and Justin Timberlake	Nominated	
Hollywood Film Awards	November 6, 2016	Hollywood Song Award	"Can't Stop the Feeling!" by Justin Timberlake	Won	
Hollywood Music in Media Awards	November 17, 2016	Best Song Written for an Animated Film	"Can't Stop the Feeling!" – Max Martin, Shellback and Justin Timberlake	Won	
Hollywood Music in Media Awards	November 17, 2016	Best Soundtrack From a Movie	Trolls: Original Motion Picture Soundtrack	Nominated	
Hollywood Music in Media Awards	November 17, 2016	Outstanding Music Supervision – Film	Justin Timberlake	Nominated	
iHeartRadio Music Awards	March 5, 2017	Best Song from a Movie	"Can't Stop the Feeling!" by Justin Timberlake	Nominated	
Movieguide Awards	2017	Best Movie for Families	Trolls	Nominated	
Nickelodeon Kids' Choice Awards	March 11, 2017	Favorite Animated Movie	Trolls	Nominated	
Nickelodeon Kids' Choice Awards	March 11, 2017	Favorite Voice From an Animated Movie	Justin Timberlake and Anna Kendrick	Nominated	
Nickelodeon Kids' Choice Awards	March 11, 2017	Favorite Frenemies	Justin Timberlake and Anna Kendrick	Nominated	
Nickelodeon Kids' Choice Awards	March 11, 2017	Favorite Soundtrack	Trolls: Original Motion Picture Soundtrack	Nominated	
Satellite Awards	February 19, 2017	Best Animated or Mixed Media Feature	Trolls	Nominated	
Satellite Awards	February 19, 2017	Best Original Song	"Can't Stop the Feeling!" – Max Martin, Shellback and Justin Timberlake	Nominated	
Saturn Awards	June 28, 2017	Best Animated Film	Trolls	Nominated	
St. Louis Gateway Film Critics Association	December 18, 2016	Best Soundtrack	Trolls	Nominated	
Teen Choice Awards	July 31, 2016	Choice AnTEENcipated Movie	Trolls	Nominated	
Teen Choice Awards	July 31, 2016	Choice Music: Song from a Movie or TV Show	"Can't Stop the Feeling!" by Justin Timberlake	Nominated	
World Soundtrack Awards	October 18, 2017	Best Original Song written directly for a Film	"Can't Stop the Feeling!" – Max Martin, Shellback and Justin Timberlake	Nominated	

- Regarding music award shows, only film-related categories are included on this list.

== Franchise ==
DreamWorks Trolls: The Experience was the first of multiple mobile pop-up attractions Feld Entertainment and Universal Brand Development had agreed to develop in April 2018. The pop-up attraction opened in New York City on October 22, 2018.

=== Sequels ===
On February 28, 2017, Universal Pictures, the studio's new distributor and parent company since its acquisition by Comcast and NBCUniversal in 2016, and DreamWorks Animation announced that a sequel titled Trolls 2 would be released on April 10, 2020, with Kendrick and Timberlake reprising their respective roles of Poppy and Branch as well as Aibel and Berger returning to write the script. On October 4, 2017, the release date for the sequel was moved up to February 14, 2020, as Fast & Furious 9 took its original April 10, 2020 slot. Along with the new release date, it was announced that Dohrn will be returning to direct and Shay will return to produce the sequel. On December 6, 2017, the film was pushed back to an April 17, 2020 release. On March 4, 2020, No Time to Die got delayed as a result of the COVID-19 pandemic, so the film was pushed to an April 10, 2020 release again through premium video on demand.

In May 2018, it was confirmed that Sam Rockwell, Chance the Rapper, Anthony Ramos, Karan Soni, Flula Borg, and Jamie Dornan joined the cast. Corden, Icona Pop, Funches, Stefani and Nayyar will also reprise their roles. In October 2018, it was confirmed that Kelly Clarkson had joined the cast, and will perform an original song.

The title for the sequel, Trolls World Tour, was announced in June 2018. In May 2017, podcasters Justin, Travis and Griffin McElroy began campaigning for roles in the film via a podcast titled "The McElroy Brothers Will Be in Trolls 2" (later renamed "The McElroy Brothers Will Be in Trolls: World Tour" after the sequel's subtitle was revealed). Following the podcast's popularity, DreamWorks confirmed in September 2018 that the McElroy brothers would make cameo appearances in World Tour.

In June 2019, along with promotional posters, new cast members were announced, which included: J Balvin, Mary J. Blige, Rachel Bloom, George Clinton, Ester Dean and Gustavo Dudamel.

On April 9, 2020, Timberlake expressed interest in future Trolls films during his Apple Music takeover, saying, "I hope we make, like, seven Trolls movies, because it literally is the gift that keeps on giving". On November 22, 2021, it was announced that a third film, titled Trolls Band Together, would be released in theaters on November 17, 2023. The film followed Branch and his newly reunited brothers saving another brother.

=== Television specials ===
Trolls Holiday is a half-hour television special that aired on November 24, 2017, on NBC. Poppy realizes that the Bergens have no holidays to celebrate. She enlists Branch and their friends (the Snack Pack) to show their best friend Bridget and other Bergens the importance of holidays. Most of the original cast (including Kendrick, Timberlake, Deschanel, Mintz-Plasse, Corden, Funches, Nayyar and Dohrn) all reprise their roles from the film. The likely-Christmas Special is also directed by Crawford and written by Josh Bycel & Jonathan Fener with music by Jeff Morrow. Its soundtrack album that features seven songs was released on October 27, 2017. It is now available on Netflix and on DVD by Universal Pictures Home Entertainment. The bonus features of the DVD also include one episode of Spirit Riding Free and two of Home: Adventures with Tip & Oh.

A second special, Trolls: Holiday in Harmony, aired on November 26, 2021.

=== Animated series ===
A 52-episode animated series based on the film, entitled Trolls: The Beat Goes On! that airs on Netflix premiered on January 19, 2018, and ran for 8 seasons. The show stars Amanda Leighton as Poppy, Skylar Astin as Branch, and Funches who is reprising his role as Cooper, and Dohrn reprising his role as Cloud Guy.

Following the release of Trolls World Tour, another animated series, titled Trolls: TrollsTopia, was released on Peacock and Hulu in 2020.
