= Trolls: Holiday in Harmony =

2021 animated film

- Genre: Musical; Comedy
- Written by: Sean Charmatz; Tim Heitz
- Directed by: Sean Charmatz; Tim Heitz
- Voices of: (See full list)
- Composer: Joseph Shirley
- Country of origin: United States
- Original language: English

Production
- Executive producers: Walt Dohrn; Gina Shay
- Running time: 26 minutes
- Production company: DreamWorks Animation

Original release
- Network: NBC
- Release: November 26, 2021

Related
- Trolls Holiday

Trolls: Holiday in Harmony is a 2021 American animated musical Christmas special that premiered on NBC on November 26, 2021. Based on DreamWorks Animation's Trolls franchise, this was the second one to be based on the franchise following Trolls Holiday, written and directed by Sean Charmatz and Tim Heitz (in their official directorial debuts) and, as of 2025, the most recent television special from DreamWorks Animation.

A majority of the cast from the two movies reprise their respective roles, including Anna Kendrick, Justin Timberlake, Rachel Bloom, and Kenan Thompson; likewise, Lauren Mayhew and Megan Hilty reprise their respective roles as Val Thundershock and Holly Darlin' from TrollsTopia. The special features famous actress and comedian Carol Burnett as the voice of Wind Breeze.

== Plot ==
While going on their first date, Poppy explains to Branch that she is planning a gift exchange, with baskets filled with invitations that has the name of another Troll in Troll Kingdom. The Troll has to buy a secret gift for that Troll and will meet in Pop Village in three days time to exchange gifts. Poppy and Branch deliver the baskets all around the kingdom before finishing in Pop Village. When they are done, they pick out the last cards and pull out each other's names, with Poppy excited to have pulled Branch's name and Branch horrified to have pulled Poppy's. Nervously, both part ways.

At Pop Village, Tiny Diamond grabs an invitation and pulls out his father's name "Guy Diamond". He does a rap, but finds it hard to rhyme with "Diamond", believing he has lost his flow. After a few failed attempts to find the perfect rhyme, Tiny heads to the top of a mountain to seek out the monks at the Cloud Temple. When he arrived, Tiny starts to meditate with the Clouds, who helped him realize that he just had to rhyme "daddy" and has his rap sorted.

Back in Pop Village, while Trolls are already gathering and busy, Poppy finishes her touches of her gift to Branch, confident that she has it right. Meanwhile, Branch comes up with the idea for a machine that does Poppy's hair, but after getting her head measurements without her knowing, he sees her gift to him and runs back to his bunker. Panicking that his gift will not be enough, Branch goes over the top and builds his machine, adding more and more functions constantly. After he finishes, he tests out the machine and it explodes, sending him into space then back down to the village. When Tiny finds him on the ground, Branch believes he failed and tells him what happened. Tiny passes on the wisdom he just learnt and tells Branch to look through the clutter. While cleaning up the mess in his bunker, Branch finds a photo of him and Poppy and realizes what he must do.

During the gift swap, Poppy and Branch reveal they got each other's names. Branch presents Poppy with a scrapbook detailing all the events up until that day, which she finds wonderful, as it is only something he could give her. When Poppy opens her gift to Branch, it turns out to be empty, because she knew there was nothing good enough for him. Poppy and Branch hug as they realize they just need each other, and they and all the other Trolls start singing "Together Now". As the song ends, Poppy and Branch go off on another balloon ride over Troll Kingdom, with Poppy kissing Branch on the cheek.

== Cast ==
- Anna Kendrick as Queen Poppy
- Justin Timberlake as Branch, a survivor and Poppy's Boyfriend
- Rachel Bloom as Queen Barb
- Jenny Mermelstein as Delta Dawn. She replaces Kelly Clarkson, who previously voiced the character in Trolls World Tour
- Kunal Nayyar as Guy Diamond
- Kenan Thompson as Tiny Diamond
- Ron Funches as Cooper
- Anderson .Paak as Darnell
- Anthony Ramos as King Trollex
- Walt Dohrn as Cloud Guy, Mr. Dinkles and Fuzzbert
- Ester Dean as Legsly
- Da'Vine Joy Randolph as Flowerface Balloon
- Carol Burnett as Wind Breeze
- Kylie Jenner as Penelopuff
- Travis Scott as Rhyme-a-saurus
- Lauren Mayhew as Val Thundershock
- Megan Hilty as Holly Darlin'

== Crew ==
- Martin Handford - Special Thanks

== Soundtrack ==
A soundtrack featuring five songs from the special was released on November 26, 2021.

All tracks are written by Joseph Shirley, except for "Signed, Sealed, Delivered (I'm Yours)" which was written by Stevie Wonder, Lee Garrett, Syreeta Wright and Lula Mae Hardaway.

| No. | Title | Performer(s) | Length |
|---|---|---|---|
| 1. | "Together Now" | Justin Timberlake; Anna Kendrick; Anderson .Paak; Anthony Ramos; Ester Dean | 2:56 |
| 2. | "Signed, Sealed, Delivered (I'm Yours)" | Justin Timberlake; Anna Kendrick; Anderson .Paak; Anthony Ramos; Ester Dean | 2:36 |
| 3. | "Tiny's Journey" | Kenan Thompson | 1:19 |
| 4. | "Together Now (TROLLS Holiday in Harmony)" | Justin Timberlake; Anna Kendrick; Anderson .Paak; Anthony Ramos; Ester Dean; Kenan Thompson; Megan Hilty; Lauren Mayhew; Ron Funches | 2:24 |
| 5. | "Holiday in Harmony Score Suite" | Joseph Shirley | 7:18 |
| Total length: | | | 16:33 |

== Release ==
The special premiered on NBC on November 26, 2021 (Black Friday). It generated a live viewership of 1.845 million and a 0.35 rating. The total viewership after a week was 2.158 million and a rating of 0.44.

== Home media ==
Trolls: Holiday in Harmony was released on Blu-Ray and DVD November 29, 2021 in the UK by Universal Pictures Home Entertainment (through Warner Bros. Home Entertainment).

It was also released on DVD and in a 2-pack Blu-ray bundled with Trolls Holiday on November 30, 2021 in the United States by Studio Distribution Services, LLC. (a joint venture between Universal and Warner Bros.)
