= Kendal Cronkhite =

American production designer

Kendal Cronkhite was most recently the production designer for DreamWorks Animation's Trolls.

She started her career in film as the assistant art director for Disney's The Nightmare Before Christmas. In 1996, she worked as an art director alongside Bill Boes on Disney's James and the Giant Peach.

In 1998, she art directed Antz for the newly founded DreamWorks Animation. Following this film, she went on to work as a production designer on several films for the studio, including Madagascar and its sequels, Madagascar: Escape 2 Africa and Madagascar 3: Europe's Most Wanted.

In 2016, she production designed Trolls. In 2020, she production designed the film's sequel, Trolls World Tour, In 2023, she was originally returned at production designer for Trolls Band Together.
