= Nick Fletcher (film editor) =

Welsh film editor of animation

- Born: Nicholas Fletcher; 29 August 1967 (age 58); Wales
- Occupation: Film editor
- Years active: 1981–present
- Employer: DreamWorks Animation (1995–present)

Nicholas "Nick" Fletcher (born 17 March 1957) is a Welsh film editor of animation. He joined DreamWorks Animation in 1993 as a supervising editor on animated features The Prince of Egypt and Shark Tale. He also worked as an editor on Bee Movie. He also worked on Spirit: Stallion of the Cimarron and Trolls World Tour.

Before joining DreamWorks, Fletcher worked at Amblimation in London, where he served as a supervising editor on An American Tail: Fievel Goes West. He also served as the animation editor on Who Framed Roger Rabbit and as co-supervising editor on both We're Back! A Dinosaur's Story and Balto.

Born in Wales, Fletcher began his career at John Wood Sound Studios in London with work on various commercials. He then moved on to Richard Williams Animation in 1981.

== Filmography ==
| Year | Title | Position |
|---|---|---|
| 1988 | Who Framed Roger Rabbit | animation editor |
| 1991 | An American Tail: Fievel Goes West | supervising editor |
| 1993 | We're Back! A Dinosaur's Story | supervising editor |
| 1995 | Balto | supervising editor |
| 1998 | The Prince of Egypt | supervising editor |
| 2002 | Spirit: Stallion of the Cimarron | supervising editor |
| 2004 | Shark Tale | supervising editor |
| 2005 | Wallace & Gromit: The Curse of the Were-Rabbit | special thanks |
| 2006 | Flushed Away | special thanks |
| 2007 | Bee Movie | editor |
| 2010 | Shrek Forever After | editor |
| 2012 | Madagascar 3: Europe's Most Wanted | editor/Voice of Frankie the Dog |
| 2015 | Home | editor |
| 2016 | Trolls | editor |
| 2020 | Trolls World Tour | editor |
| 2022 | The Bad Guys | special thanks |
| 2023 | Ruby Gillman, Teenage Kraken | additional editor |
| 2023 | Trolls Band Together | editor |
