= Walt Dohrn =

Director, animator, musician (born 1970)

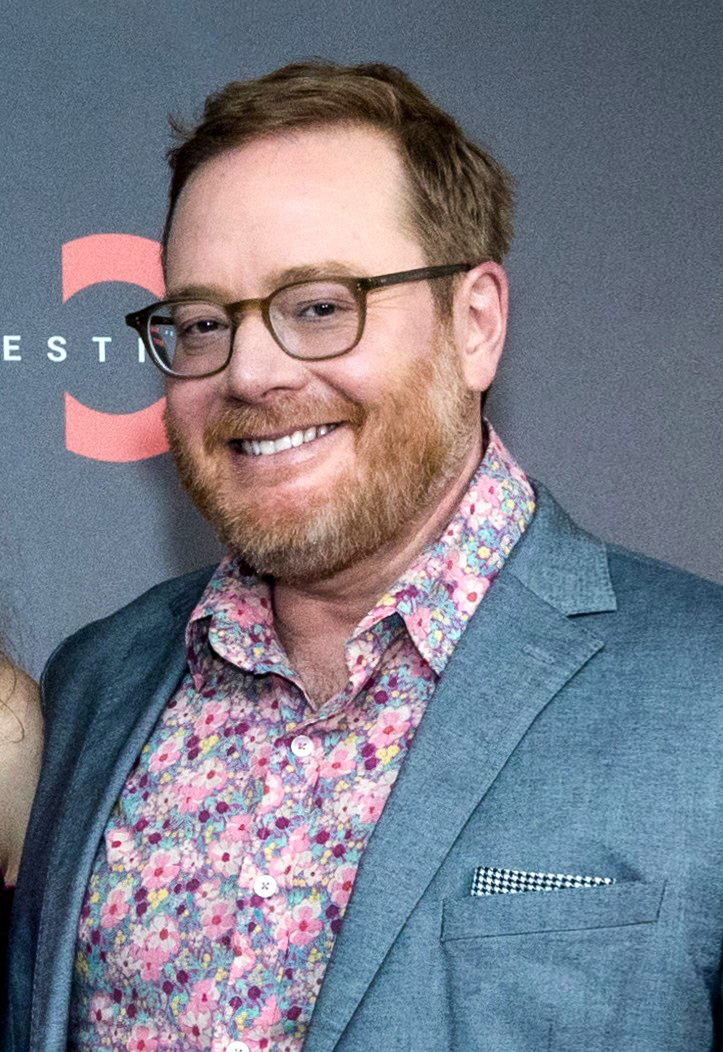
- Dohrn in 2023
- Born: Walter Dohrn; December 5, 1970 (age 55)
- Education: CalArts
- Occupations: Writer; director; animator; musician; actor
- Years active: 1994–present
- Employer: DreamWorks Animation (2002–present)
- Spouse: Suvi Booth
- Children: 3

Walter Dohrn (born December 5, 1970) is an American writer, director, animator, musician, and voice actor. He performed the voice of Rumpelstiltskin in Shrek Forever After (2010), as well as various characters in Shrek the Third (2007). He co-directed the film Trolls (2016) and directed its sequels, and voiced various characters in the franchise. With Conrad Vernon, he is co-directing Shrek 5, set for release in 2027.

Dohrn has worked as writer, director, and storyboard director in season 2 of SpongeBob SquarePants, and he also worked on 2 episodes from season 3. In 2020, Dohrn signed a deal with DreamWorks Animation. In 2025, Dohrn won the Emmy Award at the 3rd Annual Children’s and Family Emmy Awards for executive producing Orion and the Dark, in the outstanding animated special category.

== Filmography ==
=== Film ===
Year	Film	Role	Notes
1997	Mr. Magoo		Layout artist: Creative Capers
2004	Shrek 2	Rumpelstiltskin (deleted scene, delayed)	Story artist/writer: additional dialogue
2004	Shark Tale		Additional story artist
2005	Madagascar		Additional story artist
2007	Shrek the Third	Van Student, Xavier, Principal Pynchley, Nanny Dwarf, Evil Knight, Singing Villain	Story artist/writer: additional screenplay material
2010	Shrek Forever After	Rumpelstiltskin, Priest, Krekraw	Head of story
2010	Donkey's Caroling Christmas-tacular	Rumpelstiltskin	Writer/director; Short film
2011	Thriller Night	Rumpelstiltskin	Short film
2012	Puss in Boots: The Three Diablos	Water Prisoner	Short film
2012	Rise of the Guardians		Additional story artist
2014	Mr. Peabody & Sherman	Spartacus	Head of story
2014	Penguins of Madagascar	Antarctic Penguin	
2016	Trolls	Smidge, Fuzzbert, Cloud Guy, Mr. Dinkles, Tunnel Troll, and Wedgie Bergen #2	Co-director
2017	The Boss Baby	Photographer	
2017	Captain Underpants: The First Epic Movie		Special thanks
2020	Trolls World Tour	Smidge, Cloud Guy, King Peppy, Fuzzbert, Metal Mr. Dinkles, Announcer, Country Troll Baby, Country Troll Farmer (voice)	Director
2020	Tiny Diamond Goes Back to School		Executive producer Short film
2021	The Boss Baby: Family Business	Time Out Kid (voice)	
2022	The Bad Guys	Scientist (voice)	
2023	Trolls Band Together	Cloud Guy, King Peppy, Interdimensional Hustle Traveler, Smidge (voice)	Director
2024	Orion and the Dark	Stray Cat / Insomnia Guy 2 (voice)	Executive Producer
2027	Shrek 5		Co-Director

=== Television ===
Year	Film	Role	Notes
1997	Nightmare Ned		Character designer
2000–02	SpongeBob SquarePants		Writer/director/storyboard director (Season 2)
2001	A Kitty Bobo Show		Animation layout
2001–03	Dexter's Laboratory		Story/writer/storyboard artist
2002	Whatever Happened to... Robot Jones?		Writer/storyboard artist
2009	Monsters vs. Aliens: Mutant Pumpkins from Outer Space	Link Kid	TV special
2010	Scared Shrekless		Special thanks TV special
2014	King Star King		Storyboard supervisor
2017	Trolls Holiday	Cloud Guy/Smidge/Spider	Voice actor Executive producer TV special
2018	Trolls: The Beat Goes On!	Cloud Guy, Fuzzbert	Voice actor
2020	Trolls: TrollsTopia	Cloud Guy	Voice actor
2020	JJ Villard's Fairy Tales		Storyboard supervisor
2021	Trolls Holiday in Harmony	Cloud Guy/Mr. Dinkles	Voice actor Executive producer TV special

=== Video games ===
Year	Title	Notes
1997	Nightmare Ned	Director/art director/animation director
2010	Shrek Forever After	Rumpelstiltskin (voice)
