= Trolls World Tour =

2020 animated film directed by Walt Dohrn

- Theatrical release poster
- Directed by: Walt Dohrn
- Screenplay by: Jonathan Aibel Glenn Berger; Maya Forbes; Wally Wolodarsky; Elizabeth Tippet
- Story by: Jonathan Aibel; Glenn Berger
- Based on: Good Luck Trolls by Thomas Dam
- Produced by: Gina Shay
- Starring: Anna Kendrick; Justin Timberlake; Rachel Bloom; James Corden; Ron Funches; Kelly Clarkson; Anderson .Paak; Sam Rockwell; George Clinton; Mary J. Blige
- Edited by: Nick Fletcher
- Music by: Theodore Shapiro
- Production company: DreamWorks Animation
- Distributed by: Universal Pictures
- Release date: April 10, 2020
- Running time: 91 minutes
- Country: United States
- Language: English
- Budget: $90–110 million
- Box office: $49.3 million

Trolls World Tour is a 2020 American animated musical comedy film produced by DreamWorks Animation, based on the Good Luck Trolls dolls created by Thomas Dam. The sequel to Trolls (2016) and the second installment in the Trolls franchise, the film was directed by Walt Dohrn and co-directed by David P. Smith, from a screenplay by Maya Forbes, Wallace Wolodarsky, Elizabeth Tippet, and the writing team of Jonathan Aibel and Glenn Berger, and a story by Aibel and Berger. The film features Anna Kendrick, Justin Timberlake, Ron Funches, James Corden, Icona Pop, Kunal Nayyar, Zooey Deschanel, Christopher Mintz-Plasse, and Dohrn reprising their roles from the first film, with Rachel Bloom, Kelly Clarkson, Anderson .Paak, Sam Rockwell, George Clinton, and Mary J. Blige joining the cast. The film follows Queen Poppy and Branch as they discover more troll tribes that represent music genres other than their own. Troubles arise when Queen Barb of the Hard Rock Trolls (Bloom) plans to overthrow the foreign music genres to unite the Trolls under rock music, prompting Poppy and Branch to unite the tribes and stop her before all the trolls are converted into Hard Rock Trolls.

After the first film's release, a sequel was announced in February 2017, with Kendrick and Timberlake returning to their roles. Much of the new cast was signed from May 2018 to June 2019. The custom marking animation to promote the film was provided by Minimo VFX and Jellyfish Pictures.

Trolls World Tour was released by Universal Pictures in the United States in a limited number of theaters on April 10, 2020, and was simultaneously released on video on demand, due to the COVID-19 pandemic. AMC Theatres subsequently announced they would no longer distribute the studio's films, though this was later reversed after AMC and Universal agreed on a new contract. The film received mostly positive reviews from critics and grossed $49 million on a $110 million budget, making it DreamWorks Animation's first computer animated film to make less than its budget. A sequel, Trolls Band Together, was released in 2023.

== Plot ==
In the Techno Reef, King Trollex's tribe of Techno Trolls are attending a rave. Queen Barb and her Hard Rock Trolls arrive, and use weaponized guitars to destroy everything, demanding Trollex to surrender and hand over his "string".

In Pop Village, two years after the events of the first film, Queen Poppy receives a letter from Barb, inviting her to bring her "string" to unite the trolls. Poppy's father King Peppy explains there were once six magical lyre strings that represented major tribes of music - Techno, Funk, Classical, Country, Hard Rock, and Pop, but the tribes took their strings and went their separate ways after their differences broke into arguments. King Peppy, Branch, and the others do not trust Barb's invitation, but Poppy decides to sneak out with the Pop string, to prove Barb is the same as any other troll. Branch, who is trying to confess his love, and Biggie, who stowed away, accompany her on her journey. Meanwhile, one of Poppy's friends, Guy Diamond, gives birth to a son who is a miniature version of his father, which Poppy names Tiny Diamond. At the same time, Cooper finds old illustrations of trolls his shape, and sets off to find them alone.

Meanwhile, Barb sends bounty hunters of smaller music genres to find Poppy, promising to spare the tribe of the successful one. Poppy's group soon arrive at the ruins of the Classical tribe's town of Symphonyville, and meet a sentient flute named Pennywhistle, who tells them that Barb wants to forcefully unite all trolls under Rock. The group then head to Lonesome Flats to warn the centaur-like Country Trolls. Poppy feels the Country Trolls' music is too downbeat and decides to try to cheer them up first, despite Branch's reservations. The Pop Trolls wind up imprisoned, but are rescued by a smooth-talking Country Troll named Hickory. After being chased by the Country Trolls into a ravine, Hickory builds the group a raft to take them to Vibe City to warn the Funk Trolls. They encounter Chaz, a Smooth Jazz troll, who tries to paralyze them with his music. Hickory, using gumdrop earplugs to remain immune, drives him off. Angry that Poppy broke an earlier promise to keep him safe, Biggie decides to leave the group and return to Pop Village. Meanwhile, Cooper gets beamed up into a spaceship.

The group is beamed up into Vibe City, which turns out to be the spaceship that took Cooper. They reunite with Cooper, who reveals that he is actually the long-lost son of King Quincy and Queen Essence of the Funk Trolls, and twin brother of their son Prince D. As an egg, he was snatched by a bird-like monster and landed in Pop Village. Poppy maintains all trolls are the same, but Prince D explains that Pop Trolls once tried to unite all Trolls under Pop, causing the initial split. The Hard Rock Trolls attack the ship and Poppy's group is ejected to safety, accidentally separating from Hickory. After arguing with Poppy over her refusal to listen, Branch walks off and is captured by the Reggaeton and K-Pop Trolls, who fight over him until he convinces them to work together with him against Barb.

A repentant Hickory reveals he is actually a Yodeling Troll, who disguised himself and his brother Dickory as a Country Troll to steal Poppy's string. He tells Poppy to run, but Barb arrives and captures her with the Pop string. Meanwhile, Biggie returns home to find Pop Village destroyed and most of its inhabitants kidnapped. Realizing he should have never left Poppy, Biggie rallies the remaining Pop Trolls to rescue her, and they disguise themselves as Hard Rock Trolls.

At Volcano Rock City, Barb forces her captives to attend a concert, where she uses the six strings on her guitar to turn them into Rock Zombies, including Branch when he, the Reggaeton Trolls, and the K-Pop Trolls try to rescue Poppy. Poppy herself seems to have been turned, but then reveals that she used gumdrops to block out the music. She admonishes Barb for being a poor queen and not listening to her people, before smashing Barb's guitar on the ground. This restores the zombies, but the strings are destroyed, apparently ending all music and turning the trolls gray. Foiled, Barb blames the Pop Trolls for repeating history and destroying music.

Cooper hears his heartbeat and starts beatboxing with Prince D, convincing other Trolls to make sounds to create a rhythm. Poppy leads everyone into singing together from their hearts, restoring their music and colors, including Barb, who accepts Poppy's offer of friendship. Branch finally confesses his feelings for Poppy.

Later, Poppy tells the children of different tribes how important different voices are in harmony. Meanwhile, the Trolls celebrate settling their differences, and Bridget and Gristle arrive to Troll Village, unaware of the events that have taken place, and worried they have missed the party.

== Voice cast ==
- Anna Kendrick as Poppy, the queen of the Pop Trolls
- Justin Timberlake as Branch, Poppy's best friend
- Rachel Bloom as Barb, the queen of the Hard Rock Trolls
- James Corden as Biggie, the owner of Mr. Dinkles
- Ron Funches as Cooper, a giraffe-like Pop Troll
- Kelly Clarkson as Delta Dawn, the mayor of the Country Trolls
- Anderson .Paak as Prince D, one of the princes of the Funk Trolls and Cooper's twin brother
- Sam Rockwell as Hickory, one of the Yodelling Trolls
- George Clinton as King Quincy, the king of the Funk Trolls and Cooper and Prince D's father
- Mary J. Blige as Queen Essence, the queen of the Funk Trolls and Cooper and Prince D's mother
- Kenan Thompson as Tiny Diamond, a baby glittery Hip-Hop Troll and Guy Diamond's newborn son
- Kunal Nayyar as Guy Diamond, a glittery Pop Troll and Tiny Diamond's single father
- Icona Pop as Chenille and Satin, twin Pop Trolls with a flair for fashion design are conjoined by their hair
- J Balvin as Tresillo, the leader of the Reggaeton Trolls
- Flula Borg as Dickory, one of the Yodelling Trolls and Hickory's brother
- Ester Dean as Legsly, a Pop Troll with the ability to make her legs grow long at will
- Jamie Dornan as Chaz, the Smooth Jazz Troll
- Gustavo Dudamel as Trollzart, the ruler and conductor of the butterfly-winged Classical Trolls
- Ozzy Osbourne as King Thrash, the retired king of the Hard Rock Trolls and Barb's father
- Anthony Ramos as King Trollex, the king of the half-fish Techno Trolls
- Karan Soni as Riff, a Hard Rock Troll and Barb's drummer
- Lo Mutuc (Note: Credited as Charlyne Yi) as Pennywhistle, a small flute and resides with the Classical Trolls
- Red Velvet as the K-Pop Gang, a group of K-pop Trolls:
  - Joy as Ari, the green member of the gang
  - Yeri as Kim-Petit, the purple member of the gang
  - Irene as Baby Bun, the pink member of the gang
  - Seulgi as Gomdori, the yellow member of the gang
  - Wendy as Wani, the leader and the blue member of the gang
- Zooey Deschanel as Bridget, the Queen of the Bergens and Gristle's girlfriend
- Christopher Mintz-Plasse as King Gristle, the King of the Bergens
- Kevin Michael Richardson as:
  - Mr. Dinkles, Biggie's pet stuffed worm
  - Mr. Dinkles God
  - Growley Pete, a Country Troll, and Delta Dawn's deputy
  - Sid Fret, a Hard Rock Troll
- Walt Dohrn as:
  - Cloud Guy, an eccentric anthropomorphic cloud that narrates the opening prologue
  - Death Metal Dinkles
  - Fuzzbert, a Pop Troll whose legs are the only thing visible besides his hair
  - King Peppy, the former King of the Pop Trolls and Poppy's father
  - Smidge, a small and strong female Pop Troll
  - An announcer
  - Country Music Baby
  - Country Music Farmer
- David P. Smith as:
  - Country Music Rooster
  - Desert Sun
  - Eighth Goats
  - Licky Bug
  - Scrapbook Troll
- Da'Vine Joy Randolph as:
  - Bliss Marina, a magenta-colored Techno Troll
  - Sheila B, a flower-faced hot-air balloon
- Justin McElroy, Griffin McElroy, and Travis McElroy as Skyscraper Troll, a four-headed Pop Troll
  - Justin McElroy also voices a Techno Beat-Drop button that is loyal to King Trollex and a tumbleweed in Country Troll territory
  - Travis McElroy also voices Rocker Tear
  - Griffin McElroy also voices Country Music Tear
- Betsy Sodaro as Clampers, a young Country Troll
- Marcella Lentz-Pope as Carol, a seasoned Hard Rock Troll
- Berenice Amador and Jamila Hache as Marimba and Tambora, two of the Reggaeton Trolls

== Production ==
On February 28, 2017, Universal Pictures and DreamWorks Animation announced a sequel to the 2016 film Trolls, with Anna Kendrick and Justin Timberlake reprising their respective roles as Queen Poppy and Branch.

In March 2017, podcasters the McElroy brothers began campaigning for roles in the film via a podcast titled "The McElroy Brothers Will Be in Trolls 2". Following the campaign's success, DreamWorks confirmed in September 2018 that the McElroy brothers would make cameo appearances in World Tour.

Sam Rockwell, Chance the Rapper, Anthony Ramos, Jamie Dornan and Flula Borg were added to the cast in May 2018. Corden, Icona Pop, Funches, and Nayyar returned to reprise their roles. On June 12, 2018, the film was retitled as Trolls World Tour. In October 2018, it was confirmed that Kelly Clarkson had joined the cast, and will perform an original song. In June 2019, along with promotional posters, new cast members have been announced, which include: J Balvin, Mary J. Blige, Rachel Bloom, George Clinton, Ester Dean and Gustavo Dudamel.

The marking custom animation to promote the film was provided from Minimo VFX & Jellyfish Pictures, who would do the animation for Spirit Untamed and have produced assets for The Boss Baby: Family Business and The Bad Guys. With the then-recent addition of the MoonRay rendering system, DreamWorks decided to use less motion blur for the character animation, unlike the previous film, and more traditional animation smears. More films from DreamWorks continued to utilize this technique following World Tour.

=== Music ===
Along with Timberlake, Clarkson, .Paak, Blige and Clinton, songs are provided by Chris Stapleton and SZA.

The first single from the movie's soundtrack, "The Other Side", by Timberlake and SZA, was released on February 26, 2020. The Trolls World Tour: Original Motion Picture Soundtrack was released on March 13, 2020.

The score is composed by Theodore Shapiro, in his second DreamWorks Animation film, following Captain Underpants: The First Epic Movie.

== Release ==
=== Theatrical ===
Universal Pictures had originally planned to release Trolls World Tour theatrically in the United States on April 10, 2020. It was later pushed up to February 14, 2020, before being pushed back to April 17, 2020. Following the delay of No Time to Die, it was once again pushed up to the original April 10 release date. It was also set to be released on March 20 in the United Kingdom, but due to the COVID-19 pandemic in the United Kingdom, its release date was pushed back to April 6.

On March 17, Universal announced that the film would be released simultaneously in theaters and for digital rental on April 10 in the United States and Canada due to the COVID-19 pandemic. By then, Trolls World Tour had only been released in Russia, Singapore, and Malaysia. Other films distributed by the studio, such as The Invisible Man and The Hunt were also released digitally before the end of the usual 90-day theatrical run. The film was the first from Universal to receive a simultaneous theatrical and pay television release since 1983's The Pirates of Penzance.

As the lockdown measures receded, the film was released in three Santikos Theatres locations in San Antonio, Texas on May 1, 2020. Theatres in Hong Kong also started to show the film a week later on May 8, 2020. In Russia the film was made available in IMAX cinemas. In Austria and the Netherlands, it was released in both 4DX and Dolby Cinema.

=== Home media ===
Trolls World Tour was made available for an early digital purchase on June 23, 2020. The film was released on DVD, Blu-ray, and Ultra HD Blu-ray by Universal Pictures Home Entertainment on July 7, 2020. All releases include an original short film entitled "Tiny Diamond Goes Back to School". By July 19, the film had totaled $23.6 million worth of DVD and Blu-ray sales. The movie was also available to stream on the streaming service Peacock.

=== Controversy ===
In response to Universal releasing the film without consulting theater owners, as well as comments from NBCUniversal CEO Jeff Shell suggesting that future Universal releases would premiere on streaming simultaneously in theaters, AMC Theatres stated that they would not license films that also premiere at the same time on digital release; "Going forward, AMC will not license any Universal movies in any of our 1,000 theatres globally on these terms." Regal Cinemas followed suit in a statement not just directed at Universal, saying "we will not be showing movies that fail to respect the windows". However, in July 2020, AMC and Universal announced they had come to a deal to shorten the minimum theatrical window to 17 days (down from the usual 90), and that AMC would receive an undisclosed share of subsequent PVOD sales, resulting in a termination of AMC's ban on Universal's films.

The Hollywood Reporter wrote that some of the cast, including Anna Kendrick and Justin Timberlake, were not aware of the film's VOD release, and that their representatives were trying to secure the actors' bonuses they would have received had the film performed well theatrically.

=== Video games ===
A video game set after Trolls World Tour, titled Trolls: Remix Rescue, was released on October 27, 2023, by DreamWorks Animation and Game Mill Entertainment for PlayStation 4, PlayStation 5, Xbox One, Xbox Series X and Series S, Nintendo Switch, and PC. In this game, Poppy, Branch, and the player character must embark on a quest to save the Troll Kingdom from Chaz the Smooth Jazz Troll when he tries to take over the place by hypnotizing the residents with his saxophone.

Zen Studios released a Trolls pinball table as part of a DreamWorks pack for Pinball FX on December 15, 2022. Previously a mobile version was released for Zen Pinball Party on Apple Arcade in 2021.

=== Television series ===
A television series set after Trolls World Tour, titled Trolls: TrollsTopia was released on November 19, 2020. The series focuses on Poppy building TrollsTopia, a community where all the Troll tribes can live together and learn about each other's cultures.

== Reception ==
=== Box office ===
In the U.S., the film made about $60,000 in its opening weekend from 25 drive-in theaters, amid extensive movie theater closures due to restrictions targeted at the COVID-19 pandemic. By May 12, despite no official reports, Deadline Hollywood said media outlets including Box Office Mojo had underreported the figures and estimated the film was approaching $1 million from theatrical grosses. By June 7, Deadline said the film had amassed $3.6 million from the domestic box office, and likely had been the first place film every weekend since its release. It continued to play in drive-ins in the following weeks. Box Office Mojo reported the domestic gross at only $450,000 and reported the total worldwide gross at $49.3 million. The-Numbers.com did not count any domestic gross, and put the worldwide total slightly lower at $48.9 million.

=== VOD sales ===
Following its debut digital streaming weekend, it was reported by FandangoNow that the film had set the record for most streams on a release weekend by the company. The film also finished number one for Amazon Prime, Comcast, Apple TV, Vudu, YouTube, and DirecTV, with Universal reporting it was purchased 10-times more than its previous day-one rental Jurassic World: Fallen Kingdom, which had made $2–3 million on its first day. Altogether, the film made at least $40 million over the weekend. Through the first 19 days of release, it was estimated between three and five million people had streamed the film, resulting in about a $95 million gross ($77 million of which went to Universal, more revenue for the studio than the original film made during its entire theatrical run). After three months of release the film remained in the top-five across most services, and occasionally returned to the top spot on Amazon Prime, FandangoNow, and iTunes. By August, IndieWire estimated the film had made about $150 million from rentals.

Deadline Hollywood estimated that due to the film's approximate $95 million production cost, plus another $30 million spent on marketing (although rival studios claim Universal spent more than that, as high as a normal $80–100 million campaign), the film could break-even if 9–12 million people rent the film, resulting in about $200 million in revenue. The Hollywood Reporter wrote that "in the opinion of some industry veterans, [the film] may never make a dime" although "Universal believes it can make $40 million or more in profit from all revenue sources." In October 2020, The Hollywood Reporter said the film was the second-most popular PVOD title amid the COVID-19 pandemic, behind Mulan.

=== Critical response ===
On Rotten Tomatoes, the film holds an approval rating of 72% based on 160 reviews, with an average rating of 6.2/10. The site's critical consensus reads: "A fun follow-up for fans of the original, Trolls World Tour offers a second helping of colorful animation, infectious energy, and sing-along songs." On Metacritic, the film has a weighted average score of 51 out of 100, based on 36 critics, indicating "mixed or average reviews".

Owen Gleiberman of Variety magazine gave it a mixed review, calling it a "music-drenched fairy tale" and "for all its surface pleasures, it's a likable but underimagined one, with more enthusiasm than surprise and, at the same time, an overprogrammed sense of its own thematic destiny."

Entertainment Weekly gave a mixed review, calling it "Infinity War with lower stakes".

=== Accolades ===
Unlike the first film, Trolls World Tour didn't receive a nomination for an Academy, Golden Globe and Grammy Award. However, Anna Kendrick did win Favorite Voice from an Animated Movie for this film at the 2021 Kids' Choice Awards. Also, "Just Sing" did win at the 11th Hollywood Music in Media Awards for best original song in an animated film.

Award	Date of ceremony	Category	Recipient(s)	Result	Ref.
American Music Awards	November 22, 2020	Favorite Soundtrack	Trolls World Tour (soundtrack)	Nominated	
Cinema Audio Society Awards	April 17, 2021	Outstanding Achievement in Sound Mixing for a Motion Picture – Animated	Tighe Sheldon, Scott Millan, Paul Hackner, Christopher Fogel and Randy K. Singer	Nominated	
Hollywood Music in Media Awards	January 27, 2021	Best Original Song in an Animated Film	"Just Sing" – Max Martin, Justin Timberlake, Ludwig Göransson and Sarah Aarons	Won	
Hollywood Music in Media Awards	January 27, 2021	Best Music Supervision – Film	Angela Leus	Nominated	
Nickelodeon Kids' Choice Awards	March 13, 2021	Favorite Animated Movie	Trolls World Tour	Nominated	
Nickelodeon Kids' Choice Awards	March 13, 2021	Favorite Voice from an Animated Movie	Anna Kendrick	Won	
Nickelodeon Kids' Choice Awards	March 13, 2021	Favorite Voice from an Animated Movie	Justin Timberlake	Nominated	
Visual Effects Society Awards	April 6, 2021	Outstanding Visual Effects in an Animated Feature	Walt Dohrn, Gina Shay, Kendal Cronkhite-Shaindlin and Matt Baer	Nominated	
Visual Effects Society Awards	April 6, 2021	Outstanding Created Environment in an Animated Feature	Luke Heathcock, Zachary Glynn, Marina Ilic and Michael Trull (for Techno Reef)	Nominated	
Visual Effects Society Awards	April 6, 2021	Outstanding Created Environment in an Animated Feature	Brian LaFrance, Sara Cembalisty, Christopher Sprunger and Ruben Perez (for Volcano Rock City)	Nominated	
Visual Effects Society Awards	April 6, 2021	Outstanding Effects Simulations in an Animated Feature	Stephen Wood, Carl Hooper, Spencer Knapp and Nick Augello	Nominated	
Saturn Awards	October 26, 2021	Best Animated Film	Trolls World Tour	Nominated	

== Sequel ==
On April 9, 2020, Timberlake expressed interest in future Trolls films, saying, "I hope we make, like, seven Trolls movies, because it literally is the gift that keeps on giving". A sequel, Trolls Band Together, was released on November 17, 2023.
