= Thomas Dam =

Danish designer

- Born: 15 May 1915
- Died: 12 November 1989 (aged 74)
- Occupation: designer

Thomas Dam (15 May 1915 – 12 November 1989) was a Danish designer associated with Gjøl in Denmark. Dam designed and invented the original troll doll also known as the Good Luck Troll. He created the toy during a period of financial distress, and carved it from wood. Soon, the family had started up a new business and Dam earned enough to buy himself a small factory where the dolls were produced in plastic. Dam created many different trolls as well as plastic baby dolls. Dam formed "Dam Things" to market the dolls. Dam trolls are now considered collector's items. The Victoria and Albert Museum of London have one in their collection.

== Legacy ==
DreamWorks Animation released three animated films based on the dolls: Trolls (2016), Trolls World Tour (2020) and Trolls Band Together (2023), with music by Christophe Beck and Theodore Shapiro, and featuring (amongst many others) the voices of Anna Kendrick and Justin Timberlake (who also acted as executive music producer).
