= Trolls Holiday =

Television special

- DVD cover
- Genre: Musical; Comedy; Cartoon
- Written by: Josh Bycel; Jonathan Fener
- Directed by: Joel Crawford
- Starring: Anna Kendrick; Justin Timberlake; Zooey Deschanel; Christopher Mintz-Plasse; James Corden; Ron Funches; Kunal Nayyar; Icona Pop; Kevin Michael Richardson; Walt Dohrn
- Narrated by: John Cleese; Kevin Michael Richardson
- Composer: Jeff Morrow
- Country of origin: United States
- Original language: English

Production
- Executive producers: Mike Mitchell; Walt Dohrn; Gina Shay
- Producer: Holly Edwards
- Running time: 26 minutes
- Production company: DreamWorks Animation

Original release
- Network: NBC
- Release: November 24, 2017

Related
- Trolls: Holiday in Harmony

Trolls Holiday is an American animated musical Christmas special that premiered on NBC on November 24, 2017. Based on the film Trolls, the half-hour Christmas special was directed by Joel Crawford and produced by DreamWorks Animation. The main cast all reprised their roles as their respective characters, most notably Anna Kendrick, Justin Timberlake, and Zooey Deschanel as Poppy, Branch, and Bridget, respectively. Another special with the same theme, but with another plot, Trolls: Holiday in Harmony, aired on November 26, 2021, on NBC.

== Plot ==
After the Bergen Town tradition of eating Trolls on Trollstice is cancelled, (Note: As depicted in Trolls (2016)) the Bergens have no reasons left to celebrate. Poppy, who has received numerous cards from the Bergens celebrating different days of the week or times of day, decides to share Troll holidays with the Bergens. She enlists the Snack Pack and her friend Branch who is unfamiliar with being happy, to head to Bergen Town on a bus driven by Cloud Guy. Upon traveling through a wormhole, the Trolls arrive in Bergen Town.

The Trolls show Bridget and Gristle their holiday traditions, but the spectacle overwhelms the Bergens. Exasperated, Bridget tells Poppy to give them some space. Heartbroken, Poppy departs Bergen Town for the forest with her friends in pursuit. Poppy tells Branch of her fear that she might have lost Bridget's friendship forever, but Branch tries to cheer her up by singing songs pointing out where she went wrong. Meanwhile, back in Bergen Town, Bridget and Gristle start to regret how hard they both were on the Trolls, and Bridget acknowledges that Poppy cares about the Bergens.

Poppy soon realizes that she was so busy trying to celebrate with the Bergens that she was not listening to Bridget's needs. When Poppy and Branch return to Bergen Town, they find that the entire town is decorated with decorations made by the Bergens. Poppy and Bridget apologize to each other, and Branch finally cracks a smile, much to Poppy and Bridget's delight. The Bergens and the Trolls all celebrate their new holiday, Troll-A-Bration, together.

== Cast ==
- Anna Kendrick as Poppy, the queen of the Trolls
- Justin Timberlake as Branch Dory, a survival-like sage of Trolls
- Zooey Deschanel as Bridget, a Bergen and former scullery maid
- Christopher Mintz-Plasse as King Gristle, the king of the Bergens
- James Corden as Biggie, a Troll and the owner of Mr. Dinkles
- Ron Funches as Cooper, a giraffe-like Troll
- Kunal Nayyar as Guy Diamond, a glittery Troll
- Icona Pop as Satin and Chenille, twin conjoined Trolls with a flair for fashion design
- Walt Dohrn as:
  - Smidge, a small strong female Troll
  - Cloud Guy, an anthropomorphic cloud
  - Fuzzbert, a Troll whose legs are the only thing visible beside his hair
- Curtis Stone as Todd, a royal guard that works for the Bergen Royal Family
- Mike Mitchell as Chad, a royal guard that works for the Bergen Royal Family
- Kevin Michael Richardson as Mr. Dinkles, Biggie's pet worm and the narrator of the special

== Soundtrack ==
A soundtrack featuring seven songs from the special was released on October 27, 2017, by RCA Records.

All tracks are written by Eric Goldman, Michael Corcoran.

No.	Title	Writer(s)	Performer(s)	Length
1.	"Lookin' for a Holiday"	Eric Goldman, Michael Corcoran	Anna Kendrick; James Corden; Ron Funches; Icona Pop; Kunal Nayyar	0:50
2.	"Holiday"	Curtis Hudson, Lisa Stevens	Kendrick; Justin Timberlake; Zooey Deschanel; Corden; Funches; Icona Pop; Nayyar; Christopher Mintz-Plasse; The Bergens	2:50
3.	"The Holla-Day for You"	David P. Smith, Eric Goldman, Michael Corcoran, Killian Gray	Kendrick; Timberlake; Deschanel; Corden; Funches; Icona Pop; Nayyar; Mintz-Plasse	2:10
4.	"Double-Down Speed Round"	David P. Smith, Eric Goldman, Michael Corcoran, Killian Gray	Kendrick; Timberlake; Corden; Funches; Icona Pop; Nayyar	2:18
5.	"Love Train"	Kenny Gamble, Leon Huff	Kendrick; Timberlake; Corden; Funches; Icona Pop; Nayyar; Walt Dohrn; Connor Jablonowski	2:21
6.	"Friend Medley"	Andrew Gold, Bill Withers, John Deacon, Jalil Hutchins, Lawrence Smith	Timberlake; The Forest Creatures; The Bergens	2:08
7.	"Trolls Holiday Score Suite"		Jeff Morrow	5:15
Total length:				17:52

=== Charts ===
Chart (2017)	Peak position
Australian Albums (ARIA)	97
US Billboard 200	109
US Soundtrack Albums (Billboard)	7

== Release ==
The special premiered on NBC on November 24, 2017 (Black Friday).

=== Ratings ===
The premiere of Trolls Holiday attracted 5.36 million viewers, with a 1.5 in the 18-49 demographic. It is the second most watched program of the night, behind How the Grinch Stole Christmas!, with 5.78 million viewers.

=== Home media ===
Trolls Holiday was released on DVD on November 28, 2017, by Universal Pictures Home Entertainment, making it the first DreamWorks Animation DVD release to be distributed by said company, and in turn, the first Universal-distributed DreamWorks production, following Comcast and NBCUniversal's acquisition of the studio in 2016. It was streamed to Netflix on December 6. Select episodes of other DreamWorks television series (i.e. Home: Adventures with Tip and Oh and Spirit Riding Free) accompanied the special on the DVD while an episode of Dawn of the Croods accompanied the special's digital release, replacing the Spirit episode. In 2019, it was released on Blu-Ray for the first time in the US, featured on The Ultimate Holiday Collection box set, which also included various DreamWorks holiday specials as well as Rise of the Guardians. It was then re-released on Blu-Ray and DVD in a 2-movie box set alongside Trolls: Holiday in Harmony by Studio Distribution Services LLC (a joint-ventured company between Universal Pictures Home Entertainment and Warner Bros. Home Entertainment).
