= Gina Shay =

American film producer

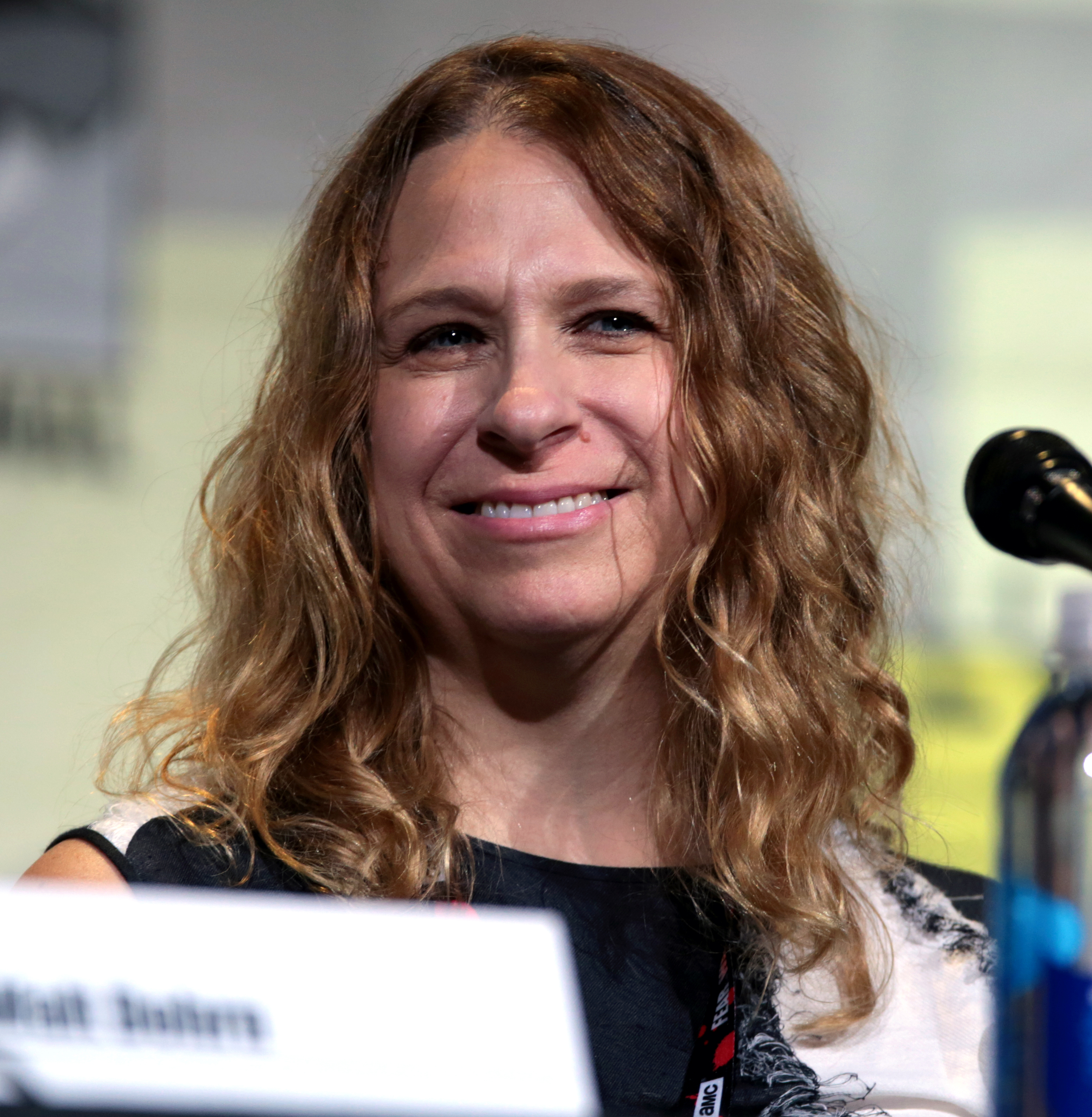
- Shay at the 2016 San Diego Comic-Con
- Born: New York City, U.S.
- Occupation: Film producer
- Years active: 1992–present
- Employer: DreamWorks Animation
- Spouse: Preston Bakshi (m. 2001, divorced)
- Children: 2, including Miles

Gina Shay is an American producer at DreamWorks Animation specializing in animated feature films. She was nominated for the Visual Effects Society Award for Outstanding Visual Effects in an Animated Feature award due to her contributions for the 2010 film Shrek Forever After.

Most recently through Gina Shay's work as producer of DreamWorks' 2016 animated film Trolls, she has expressed owning a position that advocates for generating content that effects positive body images in youth. Gina Shay verbalized this notion at the DreamWorks Animation presentation in Hall H of the 2016 San Diego Comic-Con stating:

As filmmakers we feel like it's our responsibility to give girls memorable characters that don't make them feel inadequate in body image. My daughter's eleven, she has a really powerful mind and I would rather have her using it to be imaginative instead of obsessing in front of a mirror because all girls are beautiful.

Shay is divorced from Ralph Bakshi's son, Preston. She started her career as a production assistant on Bakshi's 1992 film Cool World. Her son, Miles Bakshi, provided the voice for Tim Templeton in the DreamWorks Animation's film, The Boss Baby.

== Filmography ==
Producer

Year	Film	Position
2027	Shrek 5	Producer
2023	Trolls Band Together	Producer
2021	Trolls: Holiday in Harmony (TV special)	Executive producer
2020	Trolls World Tour	Producer
2017	Trolls Holiday (TV special)	Executive producer
2016	Trolls	Producer
2012	Puss in Boots: The Three Diablos (video short)	Producer
2010	Donkey's Christmas Shrektacular (short)	Producer
2010	Shrek Forever After	Producer
2007	Shrek the Halls (TV special)	Producer
2004	The SpongeBob SquarePants Movie	Executive producer
2001	Jimmy Neutron: Boy Genius	Co-producer
1999	South Park: Bigger, Longer & Uncut	Line producer
1998	Pocahontas 2: Journey to a New World (video)	Associate producer
1997	Pooh's Grand Adventure: The Search for Christopher Robin (video)	Associate producer

Animation department

Year	Film	Position
1994	The Swan Princess	Background coordinator
1992	Cool World	Animation production coordinator

Art department

Year	Film	Position
1998	Cartoon Sushi (TV series)	Puppet construction – 1 episode

Music department

Year	Film	Position
2010	Shrek Forever After	Musician: additional flute solos

Production manager

Year	Film	Position
1992	Cool World	Animation production manager

Soundtrack

Year	Film	Position
2010	Shrek Forever After	Writer: "Birthday Bash"

Self

Year	Film	Position
2016	Cake Wars	"Shrek" – herself – guest judge
