= Trolls: TrollsTopia =

2020s animated musical TV series

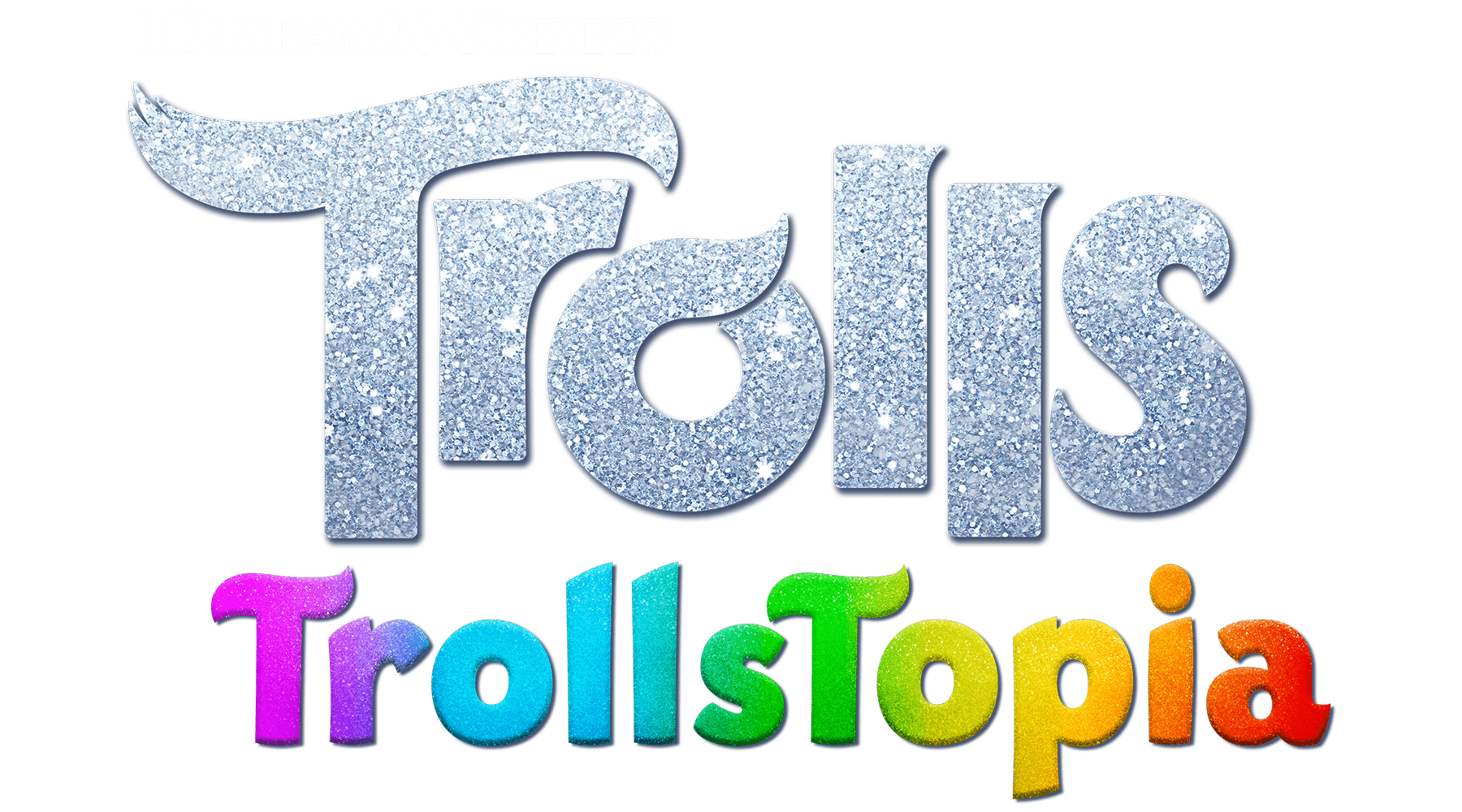
- Also known as: Trolls: TrollTropolis
- Genre: Animated sitcom; Fantasy; Musical; Comedy
- Based on: Trolls by DreamWorks Animation
- Developed by: Matthew Beans; Hannah Friedman; Sam Friedman
- Voices of: Amanda Leighton; Skylar Astin; Sean T. Krishnan; David Fynn; Fryda Wolff; Kevin Michael Richardson; Walt Dohrn; Kenan Thompson; Ron Funches; Michael-Leon Wooley; Kat Graham; John Paul Karliak; Jeanine Mason; Vladimir Caamaño; Anita Kalathara; Megan Hilty; Eric Lopez; Lauren Mayhew; Charles DeWayne
- Theme music composer: Beau Black; Loren Hoskins
- Opening theme: "We're Livin' in Harmony" by TrollsTopia Cast
- Ending theme: various ending themes
- Composers: Alex Geringas; Alana Da Fonseca; Jordan Yaeger (original songs)
- Country of origin: United States
- Original language: English
- No. of seasons: 7
- No. of episodes: 52 (103 segments)

Production
- Executive producer: Matthew Beans
- Running time: 23 minutes
- Production company: DreamWorks Animation Television

Original release
- Network: Hulu; Peacock
- Release: November 19, 2020 – August 11, 2022

Related
- Trolls: The Beat Goes On!

Trolls: TrollsTopia is an American animated series produced by DreamWorks Animation based on the 3D computer-animated comedy musical films Trolls and Trolls World Tour, and the sequel to Trolls: The Beat Goes On!, taking place between World Tour and Trolls Band Together. The series premiered on Hulu and Peacock on November 19, 2020. The series ran for 52 episodes, split into seven seasons, with the seventh and final season released on August 11, 2022.

== Synopsis ==
After the events of the second film, the series focuses on Poppy and Branch building TrollsTopia, a community where all the Troll tribes can live together and learn about each other's cultures.

== Production ==
On January 17, 2020, DreamWorks announced a new Trolls TV series, titled Trolls: TrollsTopia, to be distributed exclusively on Hulu and Peacock. The series was originally scheduled to be released on April 15, 2020. The announcement came alongside those for DreamWorks films The Croods: A New Age and The Boss Baby: Family Business, other DreamWorks and Universal-related properties such as Cleopatra in Space, Where's Waldo?, The Mighty Ones and Madagascar: A Little Wild, and new episodes of Curious George.

Due to the effects of COVID-19 on Peacock's original release schedule, many of the planned originals, including this series, have been delayed. Hulu had not announced any delays and would release the series on schedule. The release date for the series on Hulu was confirmed to be November 19, 2020. The first trailer was released on November 5, 2020.

The first screenshot was seen in the TV Kids magazine's October 2020 issue. Universal had signed a long-term agreement with Sky, with Trolls: TrollsTopia being confirmed to be among the shows included in the contract, which would see customers in Ireland and the United Kingdom getting to see the shows on the aforementioned platform.

In that same month, a storyboard of an episode titled "Dinner with Dante" was leaked onto Tumblr, but was removed shortly afterwards. It revolved around a Classical Troll named Dante Crescendo. At the same time, the series' animatic opening credits sequence was leaked. Jim Mortensen confirmed that the leaks were stolen.

Notable returning staff from Trolls: The Beat Goes On! include Matthew Beans (executive producer), Alex Geringas (composer and songwriter). Animator and director Jim Mortensen had also returned for the series, but as of February 2020, he left production of the show.

== Cast and characters ==
=== Main ===
- Amanda Leighton as Poppy, the queen of the Pop Trolls
- Skylar Astin as Branch, a sage of Pop Troll and Poppy's boyfriend
- Lauren Mayhew as Val, the minister representing the Hard Rock Trolls
- Megan Hilty as Holly Darlin', the minister representing the Country Western Trolls
- J. P. Karliak as Dante Crescendo, the royal composer and the minister representing the Classical Trolls who resides in Classical Crest
- Michael-Leon Wooley as Lownote Jones, the minster representing the Funk Trolls
- Vladimir Caamaño as Synth, the minister representing the Techno Trolls
- Charles DeWayne as Demo, a Hard Rock Troll and Val's band manager
- Eric Lopez as Gust Tumbleweed, a Country Western Troll and the sheriff of Country Corral
- Jeanine Mason as Minuet Sonata, a Classical Troll who plays the violin and a friend of Dante
- Kat Graham as Rhythm & Blues, twin Funk Trolls who are scientists and inventors
  - Nisa Ward as Rhythm ("Big Sis B" onwards)
  - Talia Thiesfield as Blues ("Big Sis B" onwards)
- Anita Kalathara as Laguna Tidepool, a Techno Troll

=== Recurring ===
- James Corden as:
  - Biggie, a Pop Troll and the owner of Mr. Dinkles
  - Mr. Dinkles, Biggie's pet worm
- Fryda Wolff as:
  - DJ Suki, a Pop Troll who uses DJ equipment made of insects
  - Satin and Chenille, conjoined twin Pop Trolls with a flair for fashion design
- Ron Funches as Cooper, one of the twin princes of the Funk Trolls
- Kunal Nayyar as Guy Diamond, a glittery Pop Troll
- Kenan Thompson as Tiny Diamond, a baby glittery Hip-Hop Troll and Guy Diamond's son
- Kevin Michael Richardson as Smidge, a small yet strong female Pop Troll with a masculine voice
- Tru Valentino as Blaze Powerchord, a Rock Troll
- David Kaye as Peppy, the former king of the Pop Trolls and Poppy's father
- Abby Ryder Fortson as Priscilla, a young Pop Troll
- Gary Cole as Sky Toronto, the boss and owner of Sky Toronto's Party Shop
- Brian T. Delaney as Beetrollven, a Classical Troll composer
- Sam Haft as Chaz, the Smooth Jazz troll who hypnotizes the Trolls
- Judy Alice Lee as Bi-Na, a K-pop Troll
- Walt Dohrn as Cloud Guy, an anthropomorphic cloud

== Episodes ==
=== Series overview ===
Season	Segments	Episodes	Originally released
1	25	13	November 19, 2020
2	12	6	March 18, 2021
3	14	7	June 10, 2021
4	12	6	September 2, 2021
5	14	7	December 9, 2021
6	12	6	February 17, 2022
7	14	7	August 11, 2022

=== Season 1 (2020) ===
No. overall	No. in season	Title	Directed by	Written by	Original release date
1	1	"TrollsTopia"	Alex Almaguer	Written by : Matthew Beans; Storyboarded by : Davin Cheng, Lake Fama, Heather Gregersen, Jane Kim, Pat Pakula	November 19, 2020
Eager to befriend the new Troll Tribes, Poppy invites advisor's to visit Troll Village with the hopes that they can live in harmony in a brand new TrollsTopia. But as the Rock Trolls prove to be a bigger challenge, Poppy must find a way to get everyone on the same page. Songs: "Come Together"; "A Good Time"; "Pandemonium"
2	2	"The Buddy System"	Yaron Farkash	Written by : John D’Arco; Storyboarded by : Davin Cheng, Lake Fama	November 19, 2020
2	2	"Kick-Off Party"	Alex Almaguer	Written by : Marie Cheng; Storyboarded by : Lake Fama, Jane Kim	November 19, 2020
"The Buddy System": In order to quickly integrate all the Trolls into TrollsTopia, Poppy decides to have every new Troll live with a Pop Troll. But when personalities and customs clash, Poppy realizes that when it comes to TrollsTopia, it is best to go slow and steady. "Kick-Off Party": When Poppy discovers that Val's idea of a kick-off party is extremely different to her own, she must find a way to plan an awesome party for TrollsTopia without stepping on Val's toes. Song: "Leaves, Leaves, Leaves!"
3	3	"Bring It In"	Amy Mai	Written by : Keith Wagner; Storyboarded by : Michelle Thompkins-Lima, Andrew Bendik	November 19, 2020
3	3	"Branch Out of Water"	Alex Almaguer	Written by : Teresa Kale; Storyboarded by : Michelle Thompkins-Lima, Joshua Angeles, Aaron Fryer	November 19, 2020
"Bring It In": When Poppy discovers that the Classical Trolls do not ever hug, she sets out on a mission to teach them what hugging is all about. But once the Classical Trolls start hugging, Poppy and The Snack Pack have to shield them from the awful truth: that their hugs are absolutely terrible. Song: "Bring It In" "Branch Out of Water": When the Techno Trolls take over Branch's favorite hot springs and disrupt his morning routine, he has to go down to Techno Lagoon to reach an understanding with Synth, a Troll with whom he has nothing in common. Song: "Best Of Friends"
4	4	"The Ballad of Holly Darlin'"	Alex Almaguer	Written by : John D’Arco; Storyboarded by : Pat Pakula	November 19, 2020
4	4	"Across the Fashionverse"	Amy Mai	Written by : Teresa Kale; Storyboarded by : Heather Gregersen, Michelle Thompkins-Lima	November 19, 2020
"The Ballad of Holly Darlin’": When Poppy receives a "thank you" note from Holly that is actually nicer than Poppy's original gift, she heads to Country Corral to investigate. She learns that this is a common habit with Holly. She always shows her appreciation in big, big ways! Considering herself a pretty appreciative Troll in her own right, Poppy and Holly soon find themselves in an escalating war of generosity. Song: "Holly Darlin's Generosity" "Across the Fashionverse": Satin and Chenille awaken from a shared dream about a dress and decide to create this masterpiece. When they have trouble crafting the perfect sash, they turn to Rhythm & Blues for some funky science help and embark on a journey to a new fashion dimension. Song: "Fashion Fighters"
5	5	"Manager Poppy"	Amy Mai	Written by : Keith Wagner; Storyboarded by : Andrew Bendik, Michelle Thompkins-Lima, Joshua Angeles, Lake Fama	November 19, 2020
5	5	"The Snug-a-lug Situation"	Yaron Farkash	Written by : Marie Cheng; Storyboarded by : Andrew Bendik, Aaron Fryer, Joshua Angeles, Lake Fama	November 19, 2020
"Manager Poppy": When Val's manager must step down just before her first all-Tribe concert, Poppy must learn the ways of the Hard Rock Tribe to make sure Val's ready for the show. Song: "Running & Running" "The Snug-a-lug Situation": Lownote Jones recruits Branch, Val, Gust Tumbleweed and Laguna Tidepool to "petsit" his exotic pet snug-a-lug, the most adorable critter in the universe. But there's one rule that they must never break: you can not hug a snug-a-lug! Song: "Right Trolls for the Job"
6	6	"Girls’ Night"	Yaron Farkash	Written by : Teresa Kale; Storyboarded by : David Cheng, Lake Fama	November 19, 2020
6	6	"Cloud Control"	Alex Almaguer	Written by : Marie Cheng; Storyboarded by : Pat Pakula, Lake Fama	November 19, 2020
"Girls’ Night": After repeated invitations, Val reluctantly agrees to attend Poppy's girls' night. But can she get through the evening without letting her softer side show? Song: "Girls, Girls, Girls!" "Cloud Control": Branch discovers that he's not the only one in TrollsTopia who Cloud Guy annoys - there's someone from every Tribe except the Rock Trolls. Upon discovering that Val is the secret to avoiding Cloud Guy, Branch attempts to ward him off and help everyone live an annoyance-free life. Song: "In Your Own Way"
7	7	"Classical Rock"	Alex Almaguer	Written by : Keith Wagner; Storyboarded by : Lake Fama, Jane Kim	November 19, 2020
7	7	"Buckin’ Branch"	Yaron Farkash	Written by : Teresa Kale; Storyboarded by : Lake Fama, David Cheng	November 19, 2020
"Classical Rock": When Poppy discovers that Rock Troll Demo has been sneaking into Classical Crest to play classical guitar, she promises to keep it a secret from Val. Song: "Race Against Time (Coming For You)" "Buckin’ Branch": The Country Trolls see something special in Branch, and invite him to a try-out for their rodeo. But when Branch struggles to keep up, he has to resort to increasingly desperate attempts to keep his "special" status, especially once the Country Trolls discover that Biggie is a rodeo savant. Song: "Bring That Glory Home"
8	8	"Rhythm & the Blues"	Alex Almaguer	Written by : John D’Arco; Storyboarded by : Lake Fama, Pat Pakula	November 19, 2020
8	8	"Mouth Guitar"	Amy Mai	Written by : Keith Wagner; Storyboarded by : Lake Fama, Heather Gregersen	November 19, 2020
"Rhythm & the Blues": When Rhythm & Blues find themselves feeling homesick and missing their friends back in Vibe City, Poppy and The Snack Pack rally around them in support. Song: "Homesick" "Mouth Guitar": A new Rock Troll named Blaze Powerchord arrives in TrollsTopia with a talent for playing "mouth guitar" (pretending to play guitar by making noise with the mouth). When Minuet Sonata challenges Blaze to a mouth guitar contest, Val takes Minuet under her wing and teaches her to rock out with a pretend guitar.
9	9	"Glitter Rush"	Yaron Farkash	Written by : Jordan Morris; Storyboarded by : David Cheng, Ainsley Dye, Joshua Angeles, Aaron Fryer	November 19, 2020
9	9	"Laguna Tidepool & the Lost Game Room"	Yaron Farkash	Written by : Grant Jossi; Storyboarded by : David Cheng, Carrie Hankins, Joshua Angeles, Aaron Fryer	November 19, 2020
"Glitter Rush": When a glitter shortage strikes TrollsTopia, Holly Darlin' teaches everyone about mining for glitter. They strike a rich vein of the sparkly stuff, allowing the Trolls to indulge their wildest glitter fantasies. Song: "Shine" "Laguna Tidepool & the Lost Game Room": Poppy and a team of Trolls follow Laguna Tidepool to an ancient temple filled with traps and obstacles on a search for the fabled greatest board game of all time. Song: "Use Your Intuition"
10	10	"Cheery Glo-mato"	Alex Almaguer	Written by : Marie Cheng; Storyboarded by : Michelle Thompkins-Lima, Chris Heltzel, Jane Kim	November 19, 2020
10	10	"Highly Amused"	Amy Mai	Written by : John D’Arco; Storyboarded by : Michelle Thompkins-Lima, Heather Gregersen, Jane Kim	November 19, 2020
"Cheery Glo-mato": After Val accidentally smashes Holly's prized Cheery Glo-mato, she must work with Poppy to get rid of her guilt by making things right with Holly. Song: "Val's Apology Song" "Highly Amused": When Dante comes down with a case of composer's block, he is unable to write any new music. That is, until he finds inspiration in the most unlikely place... Branch! Dante starts to shadow Branch's every move. As the invasion of privacy starts to wear on Branch, it becomes unclear what will reach its end first: Dante's symphony or Branch's patience. Song: "The World As Your Muse"
11	11	"The Makeunder"	Amy Mai	Written by : Matthew Beans; Storyboarded by : Andrew Bendik, Michelle Thompkins-Lima, Lake Fama	November 19, 2020
11	11	"Smidge in the Saddle"	Alex Almaguer	Written by : John D’Arco; Storyboarded by : Andrew Bendik, Pat Pakula, Lake Fama	November 19, 2020
"The Makeunder": Lownote Jones is so cool that he's always the center of attention at every occasion. But Guy Diamond's birthday party is coming up, and it's important to Lownote that Guy should get all the attention on his special day. So he recruits Branch to give him a "makeunder", and teach him how to blend in at a party. Song: "Guy Diamond's Birthday" "Smidge in the Saddle": Back in Lonesome Flats, Gust Tumbleweed was the Fun Sheriff, serving and protecting fun wherever he went. When he offers his services to TrollsTopia, Smidge decides to tag along, determined to be the perfect partner. Song: "Fun This Town"
12	12	"Extra Tootering"	Yaron Farkash	Written by : John D’Arco; Storyboarded by : Aaron Fryer	November 19, 2020
12	12	"The Last Scrapbook"	Amy Mai	Written by : Keith Wagner; Storyboarded by : Andrew Bendik	November 19, 2020
"Extra Tootering": When Tiny Diamond confesses that he has yet to fart glitter, Guy Diamond and the others rally around him, determined to help him achieve his first shimmering toot! Song: "Shining In The Light" "The Last Scrapbook": When Poppy and Val discover that they're both fans of the same scrapbook series, they join forces to try and track down the author.
13	13	"Darlin’ Dos"	Amy Mai	Written by : Keith Wagner; Storyboarded by : Heather Gregersen, Michelle Thompkins-Lima, Jane Kim	November 19, 2020
13	13	"Bad Hair Day"	Alex Almaguer	Written by : Teresa Kale; Storyboarded by : Heather Gregersen, Jane Kim	November 19, 2020
"Darlin’ Dos": When Holly gives Poppy a large hairstyle, Poppy does not want to hurt Holly's feelings by admitting that her hair is just too big. Song: "Back Home" "Bad Hair Day": Val's best friend arrives in TrollsTopia for the big concert. But when she tries to talk Val into coming back to Volcano Rock City, it's up to Poppy to show Val just how much TrollsTopia needs her. Song: "Nowhere Quite Like This"

=== Season 2 (2021) ===
No. overall	No. in season	Title	Directed by	Written by	Original release date
14	1	"Cakes on a Train"	Yaron Farkash	Written by : Teresa Kale; Storyboarded by : Ainsley Dye, Aaron Fryer, Kathryn Marusik	March 18, 2021
14	1	"It's Dad-urday"	Alex Almaguer	Written by : John D’Arco; Storyboarded by : Lake Fama, Pat Pakula	March 18, 2021
"Cakes on a Train": Poppy opens a Metroll Station train and decides to commemorate its opening with a Perfection cake, but troubles arise as not only does the cake only last for an hour after baking, but the brakes have failed! Song: "All Aboard (Join The Harmony)" "It's Dad-urday": Once a year, Trolls have a special day to spend time with their father's- Dad-urday! Guy Diamond, who is celebrating his first Dad-urday with his son Tiny Diamond, realizes that some traditional Dad-urday activities are outside his comfort zone, but not wanting to disappoint Tiny, he enlists the help of his friends to make sure he completes them all. Song: "We Are You & Me"
15	2	"Smooth Operator"	Yaron Farkash	Written by : Jordan Morris; Storyboarded by : Aaron Fryer, Chris Heltzel	March 18, 2021
15	2	"FUNtography Day"	Amy Mai	Written by : Rebekka Johnson; Storyboarded by : Jane Kim, Michelle Thompkins-Lima	March 18, 2021
"Smooth Operator": When Chaz, the Smooth Jazz Troll, arrives in TrollsTopia, Poppy realizes that she accidentally excluded a Troll and goes above and beyond to make him feel at home, but Val believes Chaz may be taking advantage of Poppy's generosity. "FUNtography Day": Minuet Sonata is the only Troll in TrollsTopia who is not excited for picture day, due to her seeming inability to ever take a good photograph, so Poppy, Holly, and Guy Diamond team up to help.
16	3	"Hopscotch Extreme"	Amy Mai	Written by : Teresa Kale; Storyboarded by : Jane Kim, Michelle Thompkins-Lima	March 18, 2021
16	3	"The Funk Wash"	Alex Almaguer	Written by : Lauren Sadja Otero; Storyboarded by : Lake Fama, Pat Pakula	March 18, 2021
"Hopscotch Extreme": When Demo proposes a Rock Troll version of hopscotch, called Hopscotch Extreme, he touts Val as the greatest player of all time, but when she shares with Poppy that her record-breaking hopscotch run was a fluke, Holly and Poppy set out to train Val. "The Funk Wash": Lownote Jones trusts the "Clean Team" (Branch, Holly, and Smidge) to clean and wash the Funk spaceship, but when Smidge accidentally scratches the paint, they try hard to fix it before Lownote finds out.
17	4	"Hair Fracture"	Yaron Farkash	Written by : Nathan Knetchel; Storyboarded by : David Cheng	March 18, 2021
17	4	"Palentine's Day"	Amy Mai	Written by : Jordan Morris; Storyboarded by : Ainsley Dye, Heather Gregersen, Michelle Thompkins-Lima	March 18, 2021
"Hair Fracture": Dr. Moonbloom prescribes a day of rest for Poppy who has a hair fracture. Unfortunately, today is the day of the TrollsTopia statue commemoration, so Branch and Val team up to make sure Poppy follows the doctor's orders and stays in bed, no matter what. "Palentine's Day": On Palentine's Day, Trolls ask each other to go with them to a party with big, elaborate, Pal-posals. Demo is chosen to pal-pose to DJ Suki, but he becomes worried that nothing he comes up with is going to be epic enough for her.
18	5	"The Party Pooper"	Alex Almaguer	Written by : Teresa Kale; Storyboarded by : Lake Fama, Jane Kim	March 18, 2021
18	5	"My Dinner with Dante"	Amy Mai	Written by : Keith Wagner; Storyboarded by : Andrew Bendik, Michelle Thompkins-Lima	March 18, 2021
"The Party Pooper": Guy and Meadow are TrollsTopia's greatest party-saving duo, known as "The Life of the Party", but then a villain known as the Party Pooper arrives on the scene and starts ending parties early. The two recruit a new team of heroes to help stop her. "My Dinner with Dante": Dante Crescendo opens up a fancy new restaurant, in order to introduce the rest of TrollsTopia to fine Classical dining, but Holly does not respond with her usual "Woo-Hoo" of enthusiasm, so Dante attempts to change his restaurant in the hopes of gaining her approval.
19	6	"Hairicane"	Amy Mai	Written by : Keith Wagner; Storyboarded by : Lake Fama, Heather Gregersen, Michelle Thompkins-Lima	March 18, 2021
19	6	"Piney & Lord Prickles"	Alex Almaguer	Written by : Teresa Kale; Storyboarded by : Lake Fama, Pat Pakula	March 18, 2021
"Hairicane": Poppy and R&B try to discover what really happens to troll hair when inside the eye of a Hairicane, but when they end up trapped, it's up to Holly to overcome her fear of Hairicanes and save them. "Piney & Lord Prickles": Val has lost her lost snuggle toy Piney. Poppy gives Val her Lord Prickles, but feels sad without him. Confiding to one another about their feelings helps Poppy and Val.

=== Season 3 (2021) ===
No. overall	No. in season	Title	Directed by	Written by	Original release date
20	1	"Potluck Poppy"	Jim Mortensen	Written by : Dan Serafin; Storyboarded by : Andrew Bendik	June 10, 2021
20	1	"Blaze and the Blazing Blazes"	Alex Almaguer	Written by : Keith Wagner; Storyboarded by : Lake Fama, Pat Pakula, Michelle Thompkins-Lima	June 10, 2021
"Potluck Poppy": Poppy throws a potluck to encourage Trolls to explore other tribe’s culinary delights, but finds herself having trouble eating a disgusting looking dish the Techno Tribe have made for her. "Blaze and the Blazing Blazes": Blaze Powerchord asks Poppy and Minuet to pretend to be his new bandmates when his old band comes to visit.
21	2	"Clash of the Battle Piñatas"	Yaron Farkash	Written by : John D'Arco; Storyboarded by : Davin Cheng, Ainsley Dye, Kathryn Marusik	June 10, 2021
21	2	"R&B in R&D"	Jim Mortensen	Written by : Keith Wagner; Storyboarded by : Andrew Bendik, Heather Gregersen	June 10, 2021
"Clash of the Battle Piñatas": The Trolls construct giant Piñata-like robots to compete in a demolition competition, but Branch's team of Holly, Synth, and DJ Suki seem to be more preoccupied with partying than actually working on their Piñata. "R&B in R&D": When the Funtime Factory begins hiring new employees, R&B attempt to impress Sky Toronto and get jobs in the Research and Development division.
22	3	"Disgruntle Weeds"	Amy Mai	Written by : John D'Arco; Storyboarded by : Lake Fama, Jane Kim	June 10, 2021
22	3	"Extreme Sleepover Club: Spooky Edition!"	Amy Mai & Seth Kearsley	Written by : Dan Serafin; Storyboarded by : Lake Fama, Heather Gregersen, Michelle Thompkins-Lima	June 10, 2021
"Disgruntle Weeds": Val's constant complaints attract a Disgruntle Weed heard, so it's up to her, Gust, Holly and Poppy to guide them back to their home. "Extreme Sleepover Club: Spooky Edition!": Dante and Demo have their first sleepover and join the Snack Pack's Extreme Sleepover Club.
23	4	"Surprise-O-Tron"	Jim Mortensen	Written by : Teresa Kale; Storyboarded by : Andrew Bendik, Ainsley Dye, Aaron Fryer	June 10, 2021
23	4	"Dante the Entertainer"	Amy Mai	Written by : Keith Wagner; Storyboarded by : Heather Gregersen, Michelle Thompkins-Lima	June 10, 2021
"Surprise-O-Tron": Val attempts to win enough Fun Dungeon tickets to afford a special prize for Poppy. "Dante the Entertainer": After Dante draws a balloon sword from a stone, the Trolls believe he is destined to become the greatest children's entertainer of all time.
24	5	"Surprising Gust"	Jim Mortensen	Written by : John D'Arco; Storyboarded by : Andrew Bendik, Ainsley Dye	June 10, 2021
24	5	"Daylight Ravings Time"	Yaron Farkash	Written by : Benjamin Siamon; Storyboarded by : Aaron Fryer, Kathryn Marusik	June 10, 2021
"Surprising Gust": Poppy learns that due to his keen powers of observation, Gust Tumbleweed has never had a surprise party, so she is determined to throw him one. "Daylight Ravings Time": Laguna is chosen to lead a celebratory rave, and turns to Poppy and DJ Suki to help her create a DJ persona.
25	6	"Nowhere to Fun, Nowhere to Hide"	Seth Kearsley & Yaron Farkash	Written by : Benjamin Siamon; Storyboarded by : Davin Cheng, Aaron Fryer	June 10, 2021
25	6	"The Joy Chord"	Yaron Farkash	Written by : John D'Arco; Storyboarded by : Aaron Fryer, Kathryn Marusik	June 10, 2021
"Nowhere to Fun, Nowhere to Hide": After becoming the last Troll left in an epic game of Hide and Seek, and with all of TrollsTopia after her, Poppy does whatever she can to last long enough to break the all-time hiding record. "The Joy Chord": Dante is excited that his personal hero, legendary composer BeeTrollven, is coming to TrollsTopia, hoping he will teach him a special chord he created that exudes pure joy in anyone who hears it.
26	7	"Wormhole Scavenger Hunt"	Yaron Farkash	Written by : Keith Wagner; Storyboarded by : Davin Cheng, Ainsley Dye	June 10, 2021
26	7	"The Fabyrinth"	Yaron Farkash	Written by : Benjamin Siamon; Storyboarded by : Aaron Fryer, Kathryn Marusik	June 10, 2021
"Wormhole Scavenger Hunt": Lownote Jones has Poppy, Holly, and Guy Diamond participate in a scavenger hunt across other dimensions. "The Fabyrinth": When Branch ends up lost in a labyrinth-like play area he devised, Poppy leads Val and Holly on a rescue mission.

=== Season 4 (2021) ===
No. overall	No. in season	Title	Directed by	Written by	Original release date
27	1	"Dance Plants"	Yaron Farkash	Written by : Benjamin Siemon; Storyboarded by : David Cheng, Aaron Fryer	September 2, 2021
27	1	"Mini Mini Golf"	Kathryn Marusik	Written by : Keith Wagner; Storyboarded by : Lake Fama, Jane Kim, Michelle Thompkins-Lima	September 2, 2021
"Dance Plants": Poppy opens a community garden, but things do not go well when Synth and Laguna's aquatic plants grow to enormous proportions. "Mini Mini Golf": Rhythm & Blues invent a Mini Mini Golf course and shrink ray to go with it. The shrunken Dante and Synth find themselves in trouble as they tumble off the golf course and in the gigantic TrollsTopia.
28	2	"Trollection"	Kathryn Marusik	Written by : Keith Wagner; Storyboarded by : Ainsley Dye, Heather Gregersen	September 2, 2021
28	2	"Bro, Team! Bro!"	Alex Almaguer	Written by : John D'Arco; Storyboarded by : Ainsley Dye, Lake Fama, Michelle Thompkins-Lima	September 2, 2021
"Trollection": Holly and Biggie both signed up for the position of secretary for skates. To settle the dilemma, Poppy holds an election, which gets out of hand when the opponents want their rival to have the position. "Bro, Team! Bro!": Red Team loses in Hugball when Synth's cheerleading goes wrong. As Poppy and Holly tries to retrain him, Synth's inner mind puts pressure on him.
29	3	"The Bunker Sitter"	Alex Almaguer	Written by : Benjamin Siemon; Storyboarded by : Andrew Bendik, Chris Heltzel, Sarah Visel	September 2, 2021
29	3	"Domin-uh-ohs"	Yaron Farkash	Written by : Dan Serafin; Storyboarded by : Lake Fama, Aaron Fryer	September 2, 2021
"The Bunker Sitter": Branch tests Poppy, Biggie, Holly and Synth to take care of his bunker so he can better participate in Troll activities. Branch's standards are too high, but the team prove to be perfectly competent. "Domin-uh-ohs": Poppy tries to bring Laguna into the spirit of her favorite past time dominoes and overcome her fear of prematurely knocking the pieces over, but Laguna tries avoid the dominoes as much as possible.
30	4	"Shiny Diamond"	Seth Kearsley	Written by : Teresa Kale; Storyboarded by : Ainsley Dye, Michelle Thompkins-Lima	September 2, 2021
30	4	"Flyer's Ed"	Yaron Farkash	Written by : Keith Wagner; Storyboarded by : Aaron Fryer, David Cheng, Michelle Thompkins-Lima	September 2, 2021
"Shiny Diamond": When Tiny Diamond introduces Poppy to his new invisible best friend, "Shiny Diamond", Poppy does everything in her power to keep the fantasy alive for Tiny. "Flyer's Ed": Lownote Jones teaches a class on how to fly the Funk spaceship.
31	5	"Puffalo Express"	Yaron Farkash	Written by : Dan Serafin; Storyboarded by : Lake Fama, Aaron Fryer	September 2, 2021
31	5	"Merry Cloudmas"	Seth Kearsley	Written by : Keith Wagner; Storyboarded by : Andrew Bendik, Chris Heltzel, Lidia Liu	September 2, 2021
"Puffalo Express": Poppy entrusts the Country Tribe's Puffalo Express to delivery invitations for a Lownote Jones surprise party. "Merry Cloudmas": Brimming with Cloudmas holiday spirit, Cloud Guy asks Poppy, Val, and Holly to help him do something genuinely nice for Branch.
32	6	"Don't Make Me Laugh!"	Kathryn Marusik	Written by : Benjamin Siemon; Storyboarded by : Heather Gregersen, Michelle Thompkins-Lima	September 2, 2021
32	6	"Hair-aldine: The Musical"	Kathryn Marusik	Written by : John D'Arco; Storyboarded by : Jane Kim, Sarah Visel	September 2, 2021
"Don't Make Me Laugh!": Cooper enters The Great TrollsTopia Laugh Out Bout where Trolls try to make each other laugh without laughing back. "Hair-aldine: The Musical": When Holly Darlin' writes and directs a musical that showcases the life of her role model, Hair-aldine Groundwater, she has an epiphany that Val would be perfect for the role.

=== Season 5 (2021) ===
No. overall	No. in season	Title	Directed by	Written by	Original release date
33	1	"Trollvial Pursuit"	Kathryn Marusik	Written by : John D'Arco; Storyboarded by : Jane Kim, Jackson Read, Michelle Thompkins-Lima	December 9, 2021
33	1	"Life of Pie"	Yaron Farkash	Written by : Teresa Kale; Storyboarded by : Davin Cheng and Aaron Fryer	December 9, 2021
"Trollvial Pursuit": While participating in a trivia game, Poppy learns she does not know as much about the Hard Rock Tribe as she thought. "Life of Pie": Holly learns that Branch is a baking savant and trains him to become TrollsTopia's greatest pie-maker.
34	2	""Big Brother Dante"	Seth Kearsley	Written by : Benjamin Siemon; Storyboarded by : Ainsley Dye, Amy Mai, Michelle Thompkins-Lima	December 9, 2021
34	2	Art Breaker"	Kathryn Marusik	Written by : Keith Wagner; Storyboarded by : Carrie-Anne Hankins, Andrew Marshel, Lidia Liu, Douglas McCarthy	December 9, 2021
"Big Brother Dante": Dante worries that he and his brother Forte Crescendo are growing apart when he visits TrollsTopia for the first time. "Art Breaker": Poppy must recreate one of Synth's paintings after accidentally destroying the original.
35	3	"The Fun Harvest"	Seth Kearsley	Written by : Matthew Ireland Beans; Storyboarded by : Andrew Bendik, Michelle Thompkins-Lima	December 9, 2021
35	3	"The Tunnel of Friendship"	Kathryn Marusik	Written by : John D'Arco; Storyboarded by : Lake Fama, Jane Kim, Lidia Liu	December 9, 2021
"The Fun Harvest": Holly sets out to prove to Sky Toronto that game pieces are better when grown the old fashioned way. "The Tunnel of Friendship": Synth and Minuet decide to commemorate their friendship with a ride down the Tunnel of Friendship, but Synth is afraid of the dark, so Holly and Poppy try to help him cure his fear.
36	4	"BPF"	Yaron Farkash	Written by : Teresa Kale; Storyboarded by : Aaron Fryer, Jackson Read	December 9, 2021
36	4	"Follicle Fitness"	Yaron Farkash	Written by : Benjamin Siemon; Storyboarded by : Davin Cheng, Aaron Fryer	December 9, 2021
"BPF": Poppy finds out about "BPF's" (Best Pet Friends), and decides to meet a cuddly pal of her own. "Follicle Fitness": Holly discovers she has unhealthy hair and enlists Smidge and Synth to whip her hairdo back into shape.
37	5	"The Not So Good Sport"	Yaron Farkash	Written by : Teresa Kale; Storyboarded by : Aaron Fryer, Jackson Read	December 9, 2021
37	5	"Bygone Bergen"	Seth Kearsley & Dan Riba	Written by : Keith Wagner; Storyboarded by : Ainsley Dye, Michelle Thompkins-Lima	December 9, 2021
"The Not So Good Sport": A K-Pop girl group comes into town, searching for a Troll labeled a "Not-So-Good Sport", who turns out to be none other than Gust Tumbleweed! "Bygone Bergen": Poppy must prove Bergen's are friendly when Holly and Val encounter one for the first time.
38	6	"Stop the Presses"	Seth Kearsley & Dan Riba	Written by : Benjamin Siemon; Storyboarded by : Andrew Bendik, Michelle Thompkins-Lima	December 9, 2021
38	6	"R&B Are On It!"	Kathryn Marusik	Written by : John D'Arco; Storyboarded by : Emily Jourdan, Lidia Liu, Douglas McCarthy	December 9, 2021
"Stop the Presses": TrollsTopia starts its own newspaper, the Fabloid, and Branch and Poppy must keep Laguna, TrollsTopia's best reporter, from finding out one of their biggest secrets. "R&B Are On It!": R&B host a "hair-podcast" to offer advice to Trolls in need, but when Biggie comes to them with a problem, the two differ on how to solve it.
39	7	"To Hug a Snug-A-Lug"	Kathryn Marusik	Written by : Keith Wagner; Storyboarded by : Emily Jourdan, Jane Kim	December 9, 2021
39	7	"The Search for Piece"	Yaron Farkash	Written by : John D'Arco; Storyboarded by : Davin Cheng, Aaron Fryer	December 9, 2021
"To Hug a Snug-A-Lug": Lownote Jones faces his old nememsis, Dr. Ravenhug, who has arrived in TrollsTopia convinced he can hug a Snug-A-Lug without consequences. "The Search for Piece": Branch hosts a game night and the Trolls will be building a puzzle, but one piece is missing.

=== Season 6 (2022) ===
No. overall	No. in season	Title	Directed by	Written by	Original release date
40	1	"Bubbled In"	Seth Kearsley & Dan Riba	Written by : John D'Arco; Storyboarded by : Andrew Bendik, Michelle Thompkins-Lima	February 17, 2022
40	1	"Fastest Draw in the West"	Kathryn Marusik	Written by : Elizabeth Chun; Storyboarded by : Lake Fama, Emily Jourdan, Jane Kim	February 17, 2022
"Bubbled In": When a bubble storm forces all of TrollsTopia to stay sheltered inside all day, we follow three sets of Trolls and explore how each decides to pass the time: Holly, Val, and Demo play "the floor is lava" with actual lava, Tiny Diamond keeps beating Minuet and Laguna at chess, and R&B help Poppy de-clutter her home. "Fastest Draw in the West": Poppy teams Holly and Minuet Sonata for a guess and draw tournament, but the two quickly realize they'll have to forge a stronger friendship connection to have any chance at victory.
41	2	"The Cloudback Whale"	Yaron Farkash	Written by : Teresa Kale; Storyboarded by : Davin Cheng, Aaron Fryer	February 17, 2022
41	2	"Truffle Trouble"	Yaron Farkash	Written by : Keith Wagner; Storyboarded by : Aaron Fryer, Jackson Read	February 17, 2022
"The Cloudback Whale": Poppy shoots off a firework and unintentionally offends a Cloudback Whale, an enormous creature that swims through the clouds, and takes to the skies on a cloud ship helmed by the Captain, Cloud Guy, in order to find the gentle beast and apologize to it. "Truffle Trouble": Holly Darlin's beloved pig critter pet, Pigtail, decides to sneak out of the house in search of big adventures with Dante Crescendo finding chocolate truffles.
42	3	"Big Sis B"	Kathryn Marusik	Written by : Keith Wagner; Storyboarded by : Lake Fama, Douglas McCarthy	February 17, 2022
42	3	"Journey to the Center of TrollsTopia"	Dan Riba	Written by : Benjamin Siemon; Storyboarded by : Ainsley Dye, Michelle Thompkins-Lima	February 17, 2022
"Big Sis B": When R&B attempt to de-age a cupcake they had given to Poppy that she had waited for too long to eat, they accidentally de-age R back to her childhood self. "Journey to the Center of TrollsTopia": When an underground river of lava threatens all of Rock Hollow, Poppy leads the Hard Rock Trolls deep under the earth to save the day.
43	4	"Race to the Crest"	Dan Riba	Written by : Teresa Kale; Storyboarded by : Andrew Bendik, Michelle Thompkins-Lima	February 17, 2022
43	4	"What's in a Nickname?"	Yaron Farkash	Written by : John D'Arco; Storyboarded by : Aaron Fryer, Jackson Read	February 17, 2022
"Race to the Crest": When an attempt at the largest bubble gum bubble ever leaves Dante’s wings stuck together, Val tries to get him out of his comfort zone and use other means of transportation to reach Classical Crest for the blooming of a rare flower, the fabled Organ Orchid. "What’s in a Nickname?": Branch finds out that Lownote Jones gives out nicknames that actually stick, and manipulates him into giving him the nickname "Ace", but when everyone's newfound faith in the incredible "Ace" leads Branch to being called on a mission he's not cut out for, he realizes that rigging the system wasn't such a good idea.
44	5	"Ready, Set, Calendar!"	Kathryn Marusik	Written by : Benjamin Siemon; Storyboarded by : Lake Fama, Douglas McCarthy	February 17, 2022
44	5	"The Party Switcheroo"	Seth Kearsley & Dan Riba	Written by : Teresa Kale; Storyboarded by : Ainsley Dye, Chris Heltzel, Michelle Thompkins-Lima	February 17, 2022
"Ready, Set, Calendar!": An influx of holidays from the different tribes leads to confusion, so Poppy decides to make the first ever TrollsTopia calendar, and asks Holly Darlin' and Guy Diamond to take pictures for it. "The Party Switcheroo": When Val and Smidge stumble upon the fun children's table at one of Dante's formal parties, they discover a way to enjoy both parties by trading places using the "Party Switcheroo."
45	6	"Keep It Up"	Kathryn Marusik	Written by : Benjamin Siemon; Storyboarded by : Lake Fama, Jane Kim	February 17, 2022
45	6	"Be My Val in Time"	Yaron Farkash	Written by : Keith Wagner; Storyboarded by : Davin Cheng, Aaron Fryer, Jane Kim	February 17, 2022
"Keep it Up": Everyone in TrollsTopia is having the time of their lives batting a balloon around, but when Poppy and Smidge find out that Holly Darlin' has a special event coming up, they do everything in their power to stop the game by letting the balloon touch the ground. "Be My Val in Time": All the plants Poppy gifted the new Trolls on their first day in TrollsTopia have finally bloomed, except Val's, so Val enlists R&B’s help to time travel back in time and take care of her plant before Poppy finds out.

=== Season 7 (2022) ===
No. overall	No. in season	Title	Directed by	Written by	Original release date
46	1	"A Life Less Score-dinary"	Dan Riba	Written by : Benjamin Siemon; Storyboarded by : Ainsley Dye, Michelle Thompkins-Lima	August 11, 2022
46	1	"The Trolls-a-Thon"	Yaron Farkash	Written by : Teresa Kale; Storyboarded by : Davin Cheng, Aaron Fryer, Jane Kim	August 11, 2022
"A Life Less Score-dinary": After finding out via the monthly "Life in TrollsTopia" survey results that the trolls find everything to be "Super Fun", instead of last month's "Super Duper Fun", Poppy decides to make TrollsTopia more exciting than usual by adding intense soundtrack and narration, courtesy of Dante Crescendo and Lownote Jones. "The Trolls-a-Thon": To honor the escape from Bergen Town, Poppy readies TrollsTopia to run the Trolls-a-thon, where the winner gets to partake in the ultimate prize, a Bergen-sized doughnut. Minuet wants to be involved and gets Smidge and Synth to help train her, but it becomes harder than expected when it turns out she has never run before, or even walked.
47	2	"Air Apparent"	Lake Fama & Kathryn Marusik	Written by : John D'Arco; Storyboarded by : Jane Kim, Douglas McCarthy	August 11, 2022
47	2	"Under New Management"	Yaron Farkash	Written by : Benjamin Siemon; Storyboarded by : Davin Cheng, Jane Kim, Jakson Read	August 11, 2022
"Air Apparent": Cloud Guy gets accepted into Cloud College, and sets out to find a suitable replacement to continue annoying Branch in his absence. "Under New Management": Feeling a little smothered by Demo's managerial style, Val decides to find another manager that better suits her needs, only to discover that finding a manager that works for her isn't as easy as it seems.
48	3	"Give Me a Break"	Kathryn Marusik	Written by : Teresa Kale; Storyboarded by : Lake Fama, Douglas McCarthy	August 11, 2022
48	3	"Once Bitten, Twice Guy"	Dan Riba	Written by : John D'Arco; Storyboarded by : Ainsley Dye, Michelle Thompkins-Lima	August 11, 2022
"Give Me a Break": When Poppy and Synth see that Minuet Sonata is running herself ragged trying to perfect her violin playing for an audition, they try to convince her to take a break, but Minuet is determined to play until she gets it right. "Once Bitten, Twice, Guy": Guy is preparing for his speech at the big Glitter Gala when he is bitten by a bat, turning him into a glampire obsessed with wearing clothes! Laguna Tidepool and Tiny agree to help him reverse the effects of the bite before it's time to give his speech.
49	4	"The Troublesome Trio"	Dan Riba	Written by : Keith Wagner; Storyboarded by : Andrew Bendik, Michelle Thompkins-Lima	August 11, 2022
49	4	"Hide & Go Hug"	Lake Fama & Kathryn Marusik	Written by : Katie Daniel; Storyboarded by : Jane Kim, Douglas McCarthy	August 11, 2022
"The Troublesome Trio": Chaz, the Smooth Jazz Troll, Marshtato Mary, and Pushy Poppy band together to take over TrollsTopia once and for all, but when they can't stop bickering long enough to get anything done, Poppy decides that what they really need is to form a friendship. "Hide & Go Hug": Poppy enacts a game where she hides and everyone who finds her then joins her, resulting in a group hug, which eventually has all the other trolls hidden away, leaving Synth, Demo and DJ as the only ones around to take on a pesky invasion of destructive rock-coons.
50	5	"Funder Construction"	Dan Riba	Written by : John D'Arco; Storyboarded by : Andrew Bendik, Michelle Thompkins-Lima	August 11, 2022
50	5	"The Tech-less Breakfast"	Yaron Farkash	Written by : Benjamin Siemon; Storyboarded by : Aaron Fryer, Jane Kim	August 11, 2022
"Funder Construction": Tiny discovers he comes from a long line of expert blanket fort builders, so he sets out to build a structure worthy of his family's legacy. "The Tech-less Breakfast": After Poppy oversleeps, R&B promise to do all the cooking for the upcoming Pancake Breakfast, confident they can just use their funk technology, but when all of the funk tech goes down, due to their ships groovetonium core breaking, they have to learn how to make pancakes the old fashioned way.
51	6	"The Farmer and the Hound"	Lake Fama & Kathryn Marusik	Written by : Keith Wagner; Storyboarded by : Douglas McCarthy	August 11, 2022
51	6	"Val Serves Murray Duty"	Yaron Farkash	Written by : Teresa Kale; Storyboarded by : Davin Cheng, Carrie-Anne Hankins, Jane Kim, Jackson Read	August 11, 2022
"The Farmer and the Hound": After TrollsTopia adds a library section for each tribe, Biggie starts reading "The Farmer and the Hound", one of the most beloved and saddest Country Western scrapbooks ever, and Poppy and Holly try to stop him from reading the super sad ending. "Val Serves Murray Duty": In order to enter the TrollsTopia theme park and ride a rollercoaster, Val must first fulfill her civic duty by dressing as the park's beloved and goofy mascot, Murray the Puffalo.
52	7	"Gal Pal Getawaycation"	Dan Riba	Written by : Keith Wagner; Storyboarded by : Ainsley Dye, Michelle Thompkins Lima	August 11, 2022
52	7	"Troll Exchange Program"	Lake Fama & Kathryn Marusik	Written by : Matthew Beans; Storyboarded by : Davin Cheng, Jackson Read	August 11, 2022
"Gal Pal Getawaycation": Val has gone out of her way to plan a vacation with Poppy and Holly, but the quaint little cabin in the woods turns out to be a neglected disaster. Not wanting all that planning to be in vain, Poppy and Holly try to convince Val that her vacation isn't anything less than perfect. "Troll Exchange Program": In the name of cultural exchange, King Trollex visits and invites one TrollsTopian to come and live with the Techno Tribe for a year, and it's up to Poppy to select who gets to go.

== Broadcast ==
In the United States, the series premiered on Peacock and Hulu on November 19, 2020. Outside the United States, it aired on YTV in Canada on December 14, 2020. The series airs on DreamWorks Channel Asia, Sky Kids in the UK, Boomerang in France and Cartoon Network in Latin America, and GMA Network in the Philippines on February 3, 2024, under the network's Astig Authority Saturday and Sunday morning block. This marks also the 2nd Season of the Filipino Dub after TV5's The Beat Goes On.
