= List of Trolls: The Beat Goes On! episodes =

Trolls: The Beat Goes On! is an American animated web television series produced by DreamWorks Animation that is based on the 3D computer-animated musical comedy film Trolls. The series was released on Netflix on January 19, 2018, and concluded on November 22, 2019.

A total of 8 seasons and 52 episodes containing 103 episode segments have been released.

== Series overview ==
Season	Segments	Episodes	Originally released
1	12	6	January 19, 2018
2	14	7	March 9, 2018
3	12	6	August 24, 2018
4	13	7	November 2, 2018
5	12	6	January 18, 2019
6	12	6	April 5, 2019
7	14	7	August 23, 2019
8	14	7	November 22, 2019

== Episodes ==
=== Season 1 (2018) ===
No. overall	No. in season	Title	Directed by	Written by	Original release date
1a	1a	"A New Bergen-ing"	Allan Jacobson, Spencer Laudiero, and Jim Mortensen	Story by : Hannah Friedman; Teleplay by : Matthew Beans; Storyboarded by : Marcelo De Souza, Naz Ghodrati-Azadi, Ruolin Li, Howie Perry, Stan Ruiz, and Sang Eun Song	January 19, 2018
Queen Poppy invites the Bergens to a party, leaving the other trolls horrified. Song: "Happily Ever After"
1b	1b	"Laugh-Out Cloud"	Alex Almaguer and Howie Perry	Written by : Matt Ackels; Storyboarded by : Noel Belknap	January 19, 2018
Cloud Guy offers to end a drought, but only if Branch becomes his best friend for a day.
2a	2a	"Two-Party System"	Spencer Laudiero and Jim Mortensen	Written by : Matt Ackels; Storyboarded by : Dennis Messner, Stan Ruiz, and Sang Eun Song	January 19, 2018
Poppy faces a dilemma after she learns that Bridget and Branch both share the same birthday.
2b	2b	"Fun Branch"	Alex Almaguer	Written by : Nate Federman; Storyboarded by : Sang Eun Song	January 19, 2018
Branch invites the Snack Pack into his survival bunker in order to prove he's fun.
3a	3a	"Royal Review"	Naz Ghodrati-Azadi	Written by : Caitlin Meares; Storyboarded by : Kevin Frank	January 19, 2018
A nervous Poppy awaits for her performance as queen. Song: "Best Day Ever"
3b	3b	"Funishment"	Spencer Laudiero and Jim Mortensen	Written by : Elaine Carroll; Storyboarded by : Onno De Jong, Marcelo De Souza, Ian Freedman, and Howie Perry	January 19, 2018
Poppy has to implement discipline in her kingdom when Cooper accidentally steals a Bergen's pie.
4a	4a	"Bad News Bergens"	Naz Ghodrati-Azadi	Written by : Marissa Berlin; Storyboarded by : Ruolin Li	January 19, 2018
Poppy signs the trolls up for Bergenball. Song: "Boom Da Party"
4b	4b	"Unhealthy Competition"	Alex Almaguer	Written by : Marissa Berlin; Storyboarded by : Noel Belknap	January 19, 2018
Smidge's stoutberry juice and Guy Diamond's Glitterade are rivaled. Songs: "Party On"; "Glitterade Jingle"
5a	5a	"Cloudy with a Chance of Hugs"	Jim Mortensen	Written by : John D'Arco; Storyboarded by : Marcelo De Souza	January 19, 2018
When Poppy and Cloud Guy hang out on Hug Day (a day where Trolls can only hug one another), a jealous Branch fears that Poppy's hug will be gone.
5b	5b	"Creek Week"	Brian Hatfield and Spencer Laudiero	Written by : Julia Miranda; Storyboarded by : Stan Ruiz and Portlynn Tagavi	January 19, 2018
After he survived being eaten at the end of the movie Trolls, a reformed Creek returns to Troll Village. But Branch refuses to let go of his anger and forgive the Trolls. Song: "Forgive Me"
6a	6a	"The Giver"	Naz Ghodrati-Azadi and Bryan Newton	Written by : John D'Arco; Storyboarded by : Ruolin Li	January 19, 2018
Poppy must figure out who left some gifts every harvest moon.
6b	6b	"Bellow Bug Day"	Alex Almaguer	Written by : Nate Federman; Storyboarded by : Noel Belknap	January 19, 2018
Things go from bad to worse when Poppy tries to fix a holiday. Song: "The Other Side of The Storm"

=== Season 2 (2018) ===
No. overall	No. in season	Title	Directed by	Written by	Original release date
7a	1a	"Prank Day"	Alex Almaguer	Written by : John D'Arco, Nate Federman and Alex Reid; Storyboarded by : Noel Belknap, Yaron Farkash and Portlynn Tagavi	March 9, 2018
On Prank Day, Branch and Poppy try to out-trick each other to earn the title of Prank Master. Song: "Happy Prank Day"
7b	1b	"Adventures in Dinkles-Sitting"	Naz Ghodrati-Azadi	Written by : Cam Baity; Storyboarded by : Ruolin Li	March 9, 2018
While baby-sitting Mr. Dinkles, Branch runs into trouble. Song: "Branch's Big Boy Dance"
8a	2a	"Eye'll Be Watching You"	Alex Almaguer	Story by : Hannah Friedman and Sam Friedman; Teleplay by : Matthew Beans; Storyboarded by : Noel Belknap, Howie Perry and Sang Eun Song	March 9, 2018
After Poppy crashes her flyer, Branch brings a safety monitor to the village. Song: "Safest Thing of All"
8b	2b	"Sorry Not Sorry"	Naz Ghodrati-Azadi	Written by : Marissa Berlin; Storyboarded by : Kevin Frank	March 9, 2018
When Gristle upsets Bridget, Poppy teaches him how to apologize. Song: "Last Forever"
9a	3a	"Big Poppy"	Alex Almaguer	Written by : Matthew Beans; Storyboarded by : Amy Mai	March 9, 2018
In a compliment rap battle, Poppy tries to dethrone reigning champ Master Controll. Song: "Rap Battle Suite"
9b	3b	"Neighbor War"	Brian Hatfield	Written by : Alex Reid; Storyboarded by : Fabien Tong and Portlynn Tagavi	March 9, 2018
Branch's plan to drive away new neighbor Sky Toronto backfires.
10a	4a	"Remote Out of Control"	Brian Hatfield and Zesung Kang	Written by : Nate Federman and Alex Reid; Storyboarded by : Marcelo De Souza and Portlynn Tagavi	March 9, 2018
Smidge, Guy, Cooper and Biggie take Branch's remote control, Gary, for a joyride.
10b	4b	"Critter Comfort"	Naz Ghodrati-Azadi	Written by : Matthew Beans and Nate Federman; Storyboarded by : Kevin Frank and Pat Pakula	March 9, 2018
Poppy's attempt to help a herd of Swampkins does just the opposite. Song: "Dance It Out"
11a	5a	"The Poppy Horror Picture Show"	Naz Ghodrati-Azadi and Brian Hatfield	Written by : Julia Miranda; Storyboarded by : Kevin Frank	March 9, 2018
When a scary story makes Biggie go into hiding, Poppy devises a plan to help him. Song: "The Winners"
11b	5b	"Dinkles Dinkles Little Star"	Brian Hatfield, Spencer Laudiero and Greg Miller	Written by : Matt Ackels; Storyboarded by : Marcelo De Souza	March 9, 2018
Biggie hires a confidence coach to prep Mr. Dinkles for a pet show.
12a	6a	"The Party Games"	Naz Ghodrati-Azadi	Written by : John D'Arco and Alex Reid; Storyboarded by : Ruolin Li	March 9, 2018
A new Party Games contestant could upstage Guy.
12b	6b	"Trolly Tales"	Alex Almaguer	Written by : Nate Federman and Alex Reid; Storyboarded by : Amy Mai	March 9, 2018
To entertain the kids on their first trip to the library, Poppy and Branch retell some classic tales. Song: "Best Buds"
13a	7a	"Model Behavior"	Alex Almaguer	Written by : John D'Arco; Storyboarded by : Yaron Farkash	March 9, 2018
Satin and Chenille put on a fashion show to impress a trendsetter.
13b	7b	"Pillow War"	Jim Mortensen	Written by : Nate Federman; Storyboarded by : Pat Pakula and Fabien Tong	March 9, 2018
The village holds a pillow fight to see who will win the comfy Pillow of Destiny. Song: "Pillow Fight"

=== Season 3 (2018) ===
No. overall	No. in season	Title	Directed by	Written by	Original release date
14a	1a	"The Imposter"	Zesung Kang and Jim Mortensen	Written by : John D'Arco; Storyboarded by : Marcelo de Souza and Lexy Naut	August 24, 2018
Someone poses as one of the Trolls, and Poppy and Branch must figure out who that imposter is. Song: "Life is Great"
14b	1b	"The Frenemy"	Zesung Kang and Jim Mortensen	Written by : Matthew Beans, Nate Federman, & Julia Yorks; Storyboarded by : Marcelo de Souza and Lexy Naut	August 24, 2018
The Snack Pack investigate their newfound imposter, Archer Pastry and find out his special hidden secret. Song: "Rhythm of Your Heart"
15a	2a	"Hair-Jitsu"	Alex Almaguer	Written by : John D'Arco; Storyboarded by : Amy Mai	August 24, 2018
Branch must learn about the patience of "hair-jitsu".
15b	2b	"Crushin' It"	Naz Ghodrati-Azadi	Written by : Lindsay Kerns; Storyboarded by : Kevin Frank and Portlynn Tagavi	August 24, 2018
Smidge becomes heartstruck with the village critter-narian, Milton Moss.
16a	3a	"Meet the Peppy"	Zesung Kang	Written by : Lindsay Kerns; Storyboarded by : Fabien Tong	August 24, 2018
To impress King Peppy during a Swag Stag hunt, Branch invents a tall tale he has to keep up with. Song: "Tickled It On The Thigh"
16b	3b	"Party Crash Course"	Zesung Kang	Written by : Julia Yorks; Storyboarded by : Marcelo De Souza	August 24, 2018
DJ Suki takes Poppy's crash course in party hosting.
17a	4a	"Trolly Tales 2"	Naz Ghodrati-Azadi	Written by : Lindsay Kerns; Storyboarded by : Ruolin Li	August 24, 2018
The Trolls try to entertain Archer Pastry with a series of Troll stories.
17b	4b	"Rainbowmageddon"	Zesung Kang	Story by : Mitch Watson; Teleplay by : Nate Federman and Lindsay Kerns; Storyboarded by : Yaron Farkash	August 24, 2018
Cloud Guy offers to fix a local rainbow in urgent need of repair. Song: "It's Party Night"
18a	5a	"Coop, Where's My Guy?"	Naz Ghodrati-Azadi	Written by : Nate Federman; Storyboarded by : Ruolin Li	August 24, 2018
Cooper leads Poppy and Branch in an unfortunate way to find Guy Diamond in time for his party.
18b	5b	"Fluffleberry Quest"	Naz Ghodrati-Azadi	Written by : Alex Reid; Storyboarded by : Portlynn Tagavi	August 24, 2018
The Snack Pack learn about Branch's Fluffleberry cake recipe. Song: "A Friend In Me"
19a	6a	"FOMO-OPUP"	Naz Ghodrati-Azadi	Written by : Julia Yorks; Storyboarded by : Portlynn Tagavi	August 24, 2018
Guy Diamond enlists the Snack Pack to hunt down Nova Swift's next pop-up party.
19b	6b	"Lost in the Woods"	Zesung Kang	Written by : Nate Federman; Storyboarded by : Fabien Tong	August 24, 2018
Lost in Troll Forest, Poppy and Archer must learn to trust each other. Song: "Best Friends"

=== Season 4 (2018) ===
No. overall	No. in season	Title	Directed by	Written by	Original release date
20	1	"Party Crashed"	Zesung Kang and Alex Almaguer	Written by : Matthew Beans and Nate Federman; Storyboarded by : Fabien Tong and Marcelo De Souza	November 2, 2018
Archer's associates, the Party Crashers invade Troll Village and hold Mr. Dinkles as hostage. With help from Archer, Poppy and the Snack Pack repel the Party Crashers. Songs: "The Party Crasher Theme", "Snuggle Puppies vs. Crasher Squad (Sing-Off Suite)"
21a	2a	"Weekend at Diamond's"	Alex Almaguer	Written by : Gabe Delahaye; Storyboarded by : Amy Mai	November 2, 2018
Poppy and Branch must help a sleepy Guy Diamond pitch his new invention to Sky Toronto.
21b	2b	"Branchception"	Naz Ghodrati-Azadi	Written by : Grant Jossi; Storyboarded by : Pavin Chaisua and Portlynn Tagavi	November 2, 2018
Branch gets trapped in a dream in which everyone worships him.
22a	3a	"The Bunker List"	Alex Almaguer	Written by : John D'Arco; Storyboarded by : Amy Mai	November 2, 2018
Branch tries to complete all the items on a "bunker list" that Poppy made for him in one day on a wager that if he loses he has to dress like a baby.
22b	3b	"The Interns"	Ben Bury and Naz Ghodrati-Azadi	Written by : Alex Reid; Storyboarded by : Ruolin Li	November 2, 2018
Satin and Chenille must save boss Nova Swift from a fashion disaster. Song: "Get Your Hopes Way Up"
23a	4a	"Three Trolls-Keteers"	Alex Almaguer	Written by : John D'Arco; Storyboarded by : Marcelo De Souza and Yaron Farkash	November 2, 2018
Guy Diamond mistakes a plea for help for an invitation to perform the trolls' new play.
23b	4b	"The Helper"	Alex Almaguer	Written by : Grant Jossi; Storyboarded by : Yaron Farkash and Pat Pakula	November 2, 2018
Smidge is eager to prove how helpful she can be.
24a	5a	"Smidgician"	Naz Ghodrati-Azadi	Written by : Julia Yorks; Storyboarded by : Ruolin Li	November 2, 2018
When the trolls secretly help Smidge with her magic show, she thinks her powers are real.
24b	5b	"DJ's Got Talent"	Zesung Kang	Written by : Lindsay Kerns; Storyboarded by : Yaron Farkash	November 2, 2018
DJ Suki tries to impress her niece during Talent Week. Song: "Because You're You"
25a	6a	"Peril Patch"	Alex Almaguer	Written by : John D'Arco; Storyboarded by : Marcelo De Souza	November 2, 2018
A strange new mini-golf course fuels competition between Poppy and Branch. Song: "Loosen Up"
25b	6b	"Sibling Quibbling"	Zesung Kang	Written by : Aaron Ho; Storyboarded by : Fabien Tong	November 2, 2018
To Chenille's dismay, Satin befriends a troll who loves extreme sports.
26a	7a	"Musical Thrones"	Naz Ghodrati-Azadi	Written by : Gabe Delahaye; Storyboarded by : Pavin Chaisua	November 2, 2018
The Musical Thrones Tournament tests Smidge and Biggie's longtime alliance. Song: "Musical Thrones"
26b	7b	"Branch Bum"	Naz Ghodrati-Azadi	Written by : Lindsay Kerns; Storyboarded by : Ruolin Li	November 2, 2018
An accident that lands the Snack Pack on a desert island transforms Branch. Song: "Feel The Vibe"

=== Season 5 (2019) ===
No. overall	No. in season	Title	Directed by	Written by	Original release date
27a	1a	"Wormhole"	Zesung Kang	Written by : John D'Arco; Storyboarded by : Yaron Farkash	January 18, 2019
The Snack Pack travel through a vortex where different wormholes go to different parallel dimensions.
27b	1b	"Ear Worm"	Alex Almaguer	Written by : Spencer Porter; Storyboarded by : Amy Mai	January 18, 2019
DJ Suki introduces a new catchy song to make chores fun. The song turns out to be so catchy it hinders the Snack Pack's day to day function. Songs: Let The Music Take Control (DJ's Catchiest Song)", "We Can Do Anything"
28a	2a	"Don't Worry Be Peppy"	Alex Almaguer	Written by : Aaron Ho; Storyboarded by : Marcelo De Souza	January 18, 2019
Poppy tries to make her father feel wanted by Troll village. Song: "Back in the Game"
28b	2b	"Two's a Cloud"	Zesung Kang	Written by : Gabe Delahaye; Storyboarded by : Fabien Tong, Pat Pakula	January 18, 2019
Cloud Guy moves into Branch's home and in turn Branch invites Cloud Guy's overprotective parents. Song: "Ain't Getting to Me"
29a	3a	"Glitter Loss"	Zesung Kang	Written by : Aaron Ho; Storyboarded by : Yaron Farkush, Lexy Naut	January 18, 2019
Guy Diamond loses his glitter and wants to get it back, but he lets his pride get the better of him. Songs: "Glitter Troll Of The Year Song", "Open Sesame (Open Says Me)"
29b	3b	"New Anthem"	Alex Almaguer	Written by : John D'Arco; Storyboarded by : Paula Assadourian, Amy Mai, Pat Pakula	January 18, 2019
A contest is held to find a new troll anthem as the one in use is an artifact from before the alliance with the Bergens. Songs: Various Anthems ("Put Your Hair Up", "Closet Rap", "Singing to Mr. Dinkles", "Glitter Farture", "Spreading The Love", "Watch Your Back", "We're The Trolls")
30a	4a	"Dark Side of the Lagoon"	Zesung Kang	Written by : John D'Arco; Storyboarded by : Yaron Farkush, Lexy Naut	January 18, 2019
The Snack Pack go on a submarine ride to retrieve DJ Suki's disco ball. Song: "Shine Bright"
30b	4b	"Mr. Glittercakes"	Naz Ghodrati-Azadi	Written by : Grant Jossi; Storyboarded by : Pavin Chaisua	January 18, 2019
Branch makes a new friend who sympathizes with his desires for alone time. Song: "Me, Myself and I"
31a	5a	"Snow Day"	Naz Ghodrati-Azadi	Written by : Laura House; Storyboarded by : Ruolin Li	January 18, 2019
Poppy, Branch and Smidge make the most of the one day a year that there's snowfall.
31b	5b	"Guy Misses Out"	Alex Almaguer	Written by : Gabe Delahaye; Storyboarded by : Marcelo De Souza	January 18, 2019
Guy tries to understand an inside joke confounding him. Song: "Is It Funny?"
32a	6a	"Scrap to the Future"	Zesung Kang	Written by : Garrett Frawley, Brian Turner; Storyboarded by : Nic Parris	January 18, 2019
Poppy finds a scrapbook that seems to predict the future. Song: "Time is On My Side"
32b	6b	"Bringing Up Birdy"	Zesung Kang	Written by : Aaron Ho; Storyboarded by : Nic Parris	January 18, 2019
Branch must face his fear of birds when a nest of newborns think he's their parent. All of a sudden, when they went back to their home, their friends (Including King Peppy) are all frozen solid. Song: "Fly"

=== Season 6 (2019) ===
No. overall	No. in season	Title	Directed by	Written by	Original release date
33a	1a	"Blank Day"	Naz Ghodrati-Azadi	Written by : John D'Arco; Storyboarded by : Lexy Naut	April 5, 2019
There is nothing to do today called a Blank Day. Poppy has a tough decision on choosing an idea to make it a new holiday.
33b	1b	"Haircuffed"	Naz Ghodrati-Azadi	Written by : John D'Arco; Storyboarded by : Pavin Chaisua	April 5, 2019
Tired of Creek and Branch's quarrels, Poppy ties their hair together forcing them to reconcile. Song: "My Favorite Guy"
34a	2a	"Marshtato Fairy"	Naz Ghodrati-Azadi	Written by : Gabe Delahaye; Storyboarded by : Lexy Naut	April 5, 2019
Branch tries to prove that the Marshtato fairy is non-existent, while Poppy tries to put some Marshtato spirit in Branch.
34b	2b	"Do the Biggie"	Alex Almaguer	Written by : Aaron Ho; Storyboarded by : Amy Mai	April 5, 2019
Guy Diamond shows Biggie the perks about being in the spotlight. Song: "Do The Biggie"
35a	3a	"Hitting the Sky Note"	Naz Ghodrati-Azadi	Written by : John D'Arco; Storyboarded by : Pavin Chaisua	April 5, 2019
Poppy takes drastic measures to bring singing into Sky Toronto's life in time for the Funphibian anniversary, but Sky's singing contains sour notes. Song: "Singing Solo"
35b	3b	"Hug Fest"	Zesung Kang	Written by : Aaron Ho; Storyboarded by : Yaron Farkash	April 5, 2019
Branch dreads going on the Big Squeeze ride at Hug Fest, while Biggie has trouble retrieving Mr. Dinkles from a prize booth.
36a	4a	"Chummy Sparklestone"	Zesung Kang	Written by : Garrett Frawley & Brian Turner; Storyboarded by : Nic Parris	April 5, 2019
Poppy and the Snack Pack perform a mystery scene starring Cooper as Chummy Sparklestone, but Cooper takes his role too seriously around Troll Village.
36b	4b	"Giggleyum"	Alex Almaguer & Howie Perry	Written by : Garrett Frawley & Brian Turner; Storyboarded by : Marcelo De Souza	April 5, 2019
Smidge's favorite Sparkle Melon Frosting is no longer in production. With Branch's help, Smidge and Poppy create a new flavor they name Giggleyum, which becomes extremely addictive in Troll Village. Song: "Keep Trying (Go Crazy!)"
37a	5a	"Glamping"	Alex Almaguer	Written by : Garrett Frawley & Brian Turner; Storyboarded by : Marcelo De Souza	April 5, 2019
Branch tries to toughen up young Trolls on a camping trip, but Guy Diamond gets in the way. Branch's attempt to implement serious camping gets himself, Poppy and the young Trolls lost until Guy comes to their rescue.
37b	5b	"A Flower for Poppy"	Naz Ghodrati-Azadi	Written by : Garrett Frawley & Brian Turner; Storyboarded by : Pavin Chaisua	April 5, 2019
Hoping to show Poppy gratitude for find his lost Croco toy, Branch goes with the Snack Pack to find the perfect flower gifts for Poppy, facing danger along the way.
38a	6a	"The Partier's Apprentice"	Alex Almaguer & Howie Perry	Written by : Aaron Ho; Storyboarded by : Amy Mai	April 5, 2019
Guy Diamond wants to train the shy florist Meadow Spriggs to throw parties for Trolls while he takes a night off. Guy gets jealous when Meadow seems to outdo him in partying.
38b	6b	"Hair Ball"	Zesung Kang	Written by : Gabe Delahaye; Storyboarded by : Yaron Farkash	April 5, 2019
Smidge has difficult choice on whether to go with Guy Diamond or Milton, but ends up hurting their feelings. Song: "Let's Get It Done"

=== Season 7 (2019) ===
No. overall	No. in season	Title	Directed by	Written by	Original release date
39a	1a	"Freeze Tag"	Alex Almaguer	Written by : John D'Arco; Storyboarded by : Amy Mai	August 23, 2019
Poppy goes detective trying to find out who "it" is in a game of Freeze Tag, with every troll gradually getting frozen.
39b	1b	"Whimsy Wasps"	Zesung Kang	Written by : Gabe Delahaye; Storyboarded by : Yaron Farkash	August 23, 2019
Troll Village is targeted by a swarm of Whimsy Wasps, which spoil their parties. Branch's plan to remove them backfires on him. Song: "I'm All Whimsy"
40a	2a	"The Fast and the Friendliest"	Alex Almaguer	Written by : Aaron Ho; Storyboarded by : Amy Mai	August 23, 2019
Branch has a hard time mentoring Keith for the Junior Flyer Grand Prix. Keith has to sacrifice his winning place in the race when Priscilla is in danger.
40b	2b	"Much Achoo About Nothing"	Naz Ghodrati-Azadi	Written by : Aaron Ho; Storyboarded by : Pat Pakula	August 23, 2019
Biggie lives his greatest nightmare when he develops an allergy to the case of Mr. Dinkles' sniffles.
41a	3a	"Extreme Sleepover Club"	Zesung Kang, Howie Perry	Written by : John D'Arco; Storyboarded by : Nic Parris	August 23, 2019
The Snack Pack take their Extreme Sleepover Club to Sky Toronto's factory. It turns out that Sky Toronto is also a member of the club.
41b	3b	"Vega Swift"	Zesung Kang	Written by : Gabe Delahaye; Storyboarded by : Yaron Farkash	August 23, 2019
Satin and Chenille look after Nova's baby cousin Vega Swift, who puts them through a great deal of trouble before they can impress Nova.
42a	4a	"Scrapbookmobile"	Alex Almaguer	Written by : Gabe Delahaye; Storyboarded by : Amy Mai	August 23, 2019
Biggie accidentally ruins one of Poppy's scrapbook stories. Poppy and Biggie try to replace with an adventure of their own. Song: "Won't Stop"
42b	4b	"Troll Rangers"	Naz Ghodrati-Azadi	Written by : Gabe Delahaye; Storyboarded by : Lexy Naut	August 23, 2019
DJ Suki's niece CJ is eager to earn her badges for a treat with Priscilla, but learn that rushing through them isn't the answer.
43a	5a	"Doc Doc, Who's There?"	Naz Ghodrati-Azadi	Written by : Aaron Ho; Storyboarded by : Lexy Naut	August 23, 2019
Poppy tries to make Dr. Moonbloom a better doctor. Finding her silliness distracts her from her medical duties.
43b	5b	"Tour Guide of Duty"	Naz Ghodrati-Azadi	Written by : John D'Arco; Storyboarded by : Lexy Naut	August 23, 2019
Branch volunteers to help Tug to find a new tourist attraction, but is forced to give trolls a tour in his own bunker.
44a	6a	"Troll Playing Game"	Alex Almaguer	Written by : Garrett Frawley, Brian Turner; Storyboarded by : Marcelo De Souza	August 23, 2019
Poppy joins in a game of Cupcakes & Caverns with Branch. When going gets tough, Poppy wins by a favorable probability
44b	6b	"Finn Cascade"	Alex Almaguer	Written by : Gabe Delahaye; Storyboarded by : Marcelo De Souza	August 23, 2019
Branch is introduced to Finn Cascade. He then tries hard to befriend the fish, but ends up making a different sort of friend.
45a	7a	"Gem Day"	Zesung Kang	Written by : Aaron Ho; Storyboarded by : Nic Parris	August 23, 2019
Poppy accidentally loses Branch's troll Gem and it gets destroyed, but King Peppy has idea to put things right.
45b	7b	"Bad Luck Branch"	Naz Ghodrati-Azadi	Written by : Garrett Frawley, Brian Turner; Storyboarded by : Pat Pakula	August 23, 2019
During a bumper bullseye ball game, Branch is apparently jinxed. Poppy brings Branch back to his senses.

=== Season 8 (2019) ===
No. overall	No. in season	Title	Directed by	Written by	Original release date
46a	1a	"Queen of the Castle"	Alex Almaguer	Written by : Garrett Frawley, Brian Turner; Storyboarded by : Marcelo De Souza, Max Lawson	November 22, 2019
Poppy decides to build Peppy's dream sandcastle, but things take a turn for the worse when the Finders-Keepers critters take over.
46b	1b	"Truth or Dare"	Zesung Kang	Written by : Gabe Delahaye; Storyboarded by : Nic Parris	November 22, 2019
Branch and the Snack Pack are invited to Poppy's house for a game of truth or dare, but Biggie isn't prepared to take a dare.
47a	2a	"Friend Matching"	Zesung Kang	Written by : Garrett Frawley, Brian Turner; Storyboarded by : Nic Parris	November 22, 2019
Smidge helps Poppy with her Friend Matching campaign, but their efforts cause friction instead. Song: "Ready, Set, Go! (Sing-Off)"
47b	2b	"Trolly Tales 3"	Alex Almaguer	Written by : John D'Arco; Storyboarded by : Amy Mai	November 22, 2019
DJ Suki, Poppy and Guy Diamond tell their own Trolly Tales at the daycare to baby trolls.
48a	3a	"Apple of My Ire"	Naz Ghodrati-Azadi	Written by : John D'Arco; Storyboarded by : Pat Pakula	November 22, 2019
Cloud Guy is upset by Branch's end to their rivalry. But Branch gets overly suspicious from Cloud Guy's lack of pranks.
48b	3b	"Funsgiving"	Zesung Kang	Written by : Aaron Ho; Storyboarded by : Michael Chang, Yaron Farkash	November 22, 2019
Biggie has been picked this year to host Funsgiving dinner, but is worried that it won't be perfect. Song: "We're Cookin'"
49a	4a	"Bunker Break-In"	Zesung Kang	Written by : John D'Arco; Storyboarded by : Nic Parris	November 22, 2019
Branch challenges Poppy and the Snack Pack to infiltrate his impenetrable bunker and capture his flag.
49b	4b	"To Catch a Critter"	Alex Almaguer	Written by : Aaron Ho; Storyboarded by : Marcelo De Souza	November 22, 2019
Smidge is going a date with Milton. Smidge however has to bring back Milton's escaped critters.
50a	5a	"CJ's Wooferbug"	Zesung Kang	Written by : Gabe Delahaye; Storyboarded by : Michael Chang, Naz Ghodrati-Azadi, Lexy Naut, Nic Parris, Pat Pakula	November 22, 2019
DJ gets a new Wooferbug for CJ's birthday, but this Wooferbug won't budge until music is played. Song: "Let The Rhythm Take Over (Do It)"
50b	5b	"What Did I Miss?"	Jim Mortensen	Written by : Aaron Ho; Storyboarded by : Lexy Naut, Nic Parris	November 22, 2019
Poppy tells King Peppy various events of the day, sometime casual stuff but mostly frustrating incidents.
51a	6a	"Tall Tail"	Alex Almaguer	Written by : Garrett Frawley, Brian Turner; Storyboarded by : Jane Kim, Amy Mai	November 22, 2019
Creek has failed to bring a fondue to today's party and Branch accuses him of Party Foul. Later he finds himself in Creek's shoes. Song: "Swagnificent"
51b	6b	"BFFF"	Naz Ghodrati-Azadi	Written by : Gabe Delahaye; Storyboarded by : Lexy Naut, Pat Pakula	November 22, 2019
The trolls debate on what to put in Branch's time capsule invention, then Cooper buries the empty capsule.
52a	7a	"Switcher-Ruby"	Naz Ghodrati-Azadi	Written by : Garrett Frawley, Brian Turner; Storyboarded by : Max Lawson, Amy Mai, Pat Pakula	November 22, 2019
A ruby switches Poppy's and Branch's minds into one another's body. They struggle to carry out the respective duties as they wait for the ruby to recharge.
52b	7b	"Bye Bye Bunker"	Alex Almaguer	Written by : Matthew Beans; Storyboarded by : Marcelo De Souza, Max Lawson, Amy Mai, Pat Pakula	November 22, 2019
Branch has decided to move out of his bunker to self-destruct it permanently, but he proves to every troll that he is not ready for drastic changes. Song: "Shine Like Gold"
