= Elder (administrative title) =

Person with authority over others

The term elder, or its equivalent in another language, is used in several countries and organizations to indicate a position of authority. This usage is usually derived from the notion that the oldest members of any given group are the wisest, and are thus the most qualified to rule, provide counsel or serve the said group in some other capacity. They often serve as oral repositories of their culture's traditional knowledge, morals, and values.

== Elder systems ==
Elder is a role in a polity or community. Elderhood is the condition or quality of being an elder, the state of being of advanced age and in leadership roles.

Sometimes, the role is recognized by a ceremony or milestone, while other times it is the oldest person in a group. Elders are generally expected to guide younger people, share life experiences, foster unity, and act as leaders of their communities.

=== Mentorship ===
Another example is the vocational mentor, who guides apprentices with tools of sponsorship, advocacy, and skills demonstration. The mentor serves to facilitate creativity in apprentices by passing on traditional methods pertaining to their occupation.

=== Advisory councils ===
In governmental contexts, elders sometimes serve as members of an advisory body for other leaders, such as kings and presidents, as a council of elders. This gives them power and prestige. Due to this, elderhood of this variety is generally considered to be an aspirational role in many communities.

=== Matriarchs ===
An example of elderhood is the role of the matriarch. In societies with matriarchs, women elders tend to be leaders of their families. Matriarchs are involved in creating and regenerating communities and families. They raise issues and opinions that are unseen into policy through changing both systemic political policy and building everyday participation. They use their moral authority to push for policy change by bringing disparate communities together, often using personal storytelling and speaking on behalf of their communities. Matriarchs are considered holders of wisdom and guardians of their community and its culture, customs and religion. They are expected to support and empower their families. Matriarchs are also sometimes political leaders governing households, economies and matriclans.

== Titles in different cultures ==
- Alderman in systems with Anglo-Saxon origins is synonymous with what may be known elsewhere as a “city councilman”. It derives from the term ealdorman, meaning "elder man".
- North American Indigenous elder
- Aqsaqal, meaning "white beard" in Turkic languages.
- Auncient, deriving from the Norman French noun ancien, signifying "an elder". This has restricted use in English ceremonial orders of precedence, especially in legal circles.
- Australian Aboriginal elders are widely respected men and women possessing authority and a deep knowledge of traditional lore. They are consulted on any important aspect of Aboriginal life.
- Gerousia, meaning “Council of Elders”, was the Spartan equivalent of a council.
- Hor Chan, from Mayan language meaning "Chief of Chan", was a term some Maya used to refer to themselves.
- Kaumātua are tribal elders in Māori society.
- Oday is the term for elder in the Somali language. Elders hold an important position in Somali society, particularly within the framework of xeer (Somali customary law) where they act as judges.
- Oloye is the title for elders of aristocratic rank among the Yoruba of West Africa, though they usually translate it as chieftain.
- Onyishi is a gerontocratic form of government in some parts of Igboland in Nigeria.
- Senator, in the Senate of Rome, all senators were men. Senator comes from the Latin root sen- "old" (senex "old man"; compare "senior"), and senators were actually called patres ("fathers").
- Seniūnas, the ruler of Eldership, (seniūnija in Lithuanian), Lithuania's smallest administrative division.
- Sheikh means "old man" in Arabic. The word has specific cultural and religious connotations as well.
- Starosta, derived from Slavic word stary (old), is a title for an official or unofficial position of leadership in various contexts through most of Slavic history (see also: Starets).
- Thamade (Тхьэмадэ) is a respected elder in Circassian society who presides over social gatherings and ceremonies and acts as a moral authority in accordance with Adyghe Xabze, the traditional code of conduct.
- Vanem, ancient ruler of an Estonian parish and county. From 1920–1937, the Estonian head of state and head of government was called Riigivanem, meaning "State Elder". Today, county governors are called maavanem and parish mayors vallavanem.
- Witan in Anglo-Saxon and other Germanic traditions was a wise man, although usually just a noble. The term is most often used to describe those who convened as the Witenagemot.

== See also ==
- Big man (anthropology)
- Religious elder
- Village head
