= Gerontocracy =

Social system with elderly rule

A gerontocracy is a form of rule in which a political entity is ruled by leaders who are substantially older than most of the population. In many political structures, power within the ruling class accumulates with age, making the oldest individuals the most powerful. Those holding the most power may not be in formal leadership positions, but often dominate those who are. In simple terms, a gerontocracy is a society in which power is reserved for elders. The term was coined in 1828, by Jean-Jacques Fazy, to criticise the French government at the time. The idea of the elderly holding power exists in many cultures, with African gerontocracy having its roots in West Africa, and it is still being practiced by Amedokhian people and many other Esan communities. In Ancient Greece, Plato stated that "it is for the elder man to rule and for the younger to submit". An example of the Ancient Greek gerontocracy can be seen in the city-state of Sparta, which was ruled by the Gerousia, a council made up of members who were at least 60 years old and who served for life.

In democracies, gerontocracy is associated with a higher voter turnout with age and can result in disproportionate pension spending.

== In political systems ==
=== Africa ===
Reporting on the then 92-year-old Paul Biya's campaign for an eighth term as president of Cameroon, NPR noted a high rate of elderly heads of state across Africa, including Peter Mutharika of Malawi, Yoweri Museveni of Uganda, Alassane Ouattara of the Ivory Coast, Teodoro Obiang Nguema Mbasogo of Equatorial Guinea and Emmerson Mnangagwa of Zimbabwe. Mutharika was then 85 years old and Museveni was 81, while the latter three were all 83. Biya himself was the oldest incumbent head of state in the world.

In Liberia, Joseph Boakai was inaugurated as president in January 2024 at the age of 79, becoming the country's oldest-ever president after defeating the incumbent George Weah, Liberia's youngest-ever president, in a runoff. During the 2023 campaign, Boakai presented his age as an asset, while his opponents argued that it should disqualify him. Concerns about his health resurfaced at his inauguration, when he was helped from the podium before finishing his speech; his party's spokesperson attributed the episode to heat rather than ill health.

=== Communist states ===
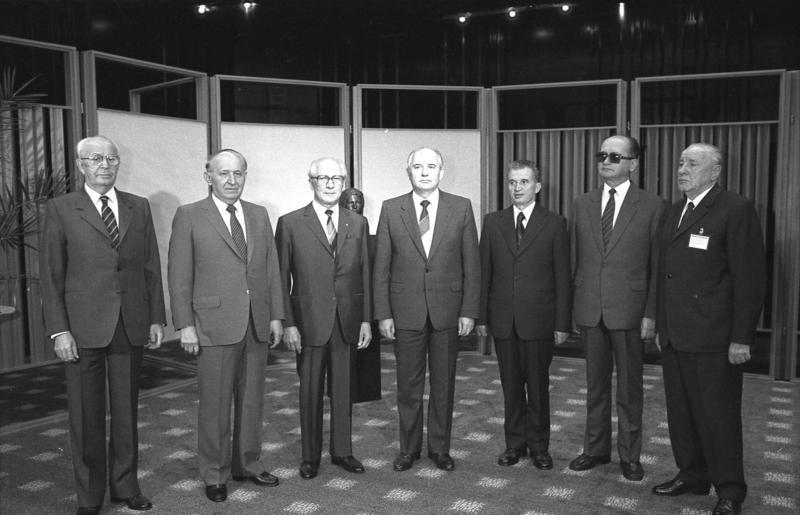
Meeting of the seven representatives of the Warsaw Pact countries in 1987: Gustáv Husák, Todor Zhivkov, Erich Honecker, Mikhail Gorbachev, Nicolae Ceaușescu, Wojciech Jaruzelski, and János Kádár. Their average age then was 69.

Communist countries with leaders in their seventies or higher have included:

- Albania (First Secretary Enver Hoxha was 76 at death)
- Bulgaria (General Secretary Todor Zhivkov was 78 at resignation)
- Czechoslovakia (President Gustáv Husák was 76 at resignation)
- East Germany (almost every head of the Socialist Unity Party of Germany was at or above the age of 70 when their tenure ended (Note: President Wilhelm Pieck was 84 at death, prime minister Otto Grotewohl was 70 at death, First Secretary Walter Ulbricht was 77 when ousted as First Secretary and 80 at his death as President and (figurehead) Chairman of the Central Committee, and General Secretary and head of state Erich Honecker was 77 when forced out, leaving only Egon Krenz stepping down at 52 as the regime collapsed))
- Hungary (General Secretary János Kádár was 75 when forced out)
- Laos (every former president was above the age of 70 when their tenure ended, (Note: Souphanouvong stepped down at 77, acting president Phoumi Vongvichit stepped down at 82, Kaysone Phomvihane died in office at 71, Nouhak Phoumsavanh stepped down at 87, Khamtai Siphandone stepped down at 82, Choummaly Sayasone stepped down at 79, and Bounnhang Vorachit stepped down at 83.) while incumbent president Thongloun Sisoulith was 75 upon taking office)
- North Korea (Supreme Leaders Kim Il Sung and Kim Jong Il were respectively 82 and 70 at death)
- Romania (General Secretary and Conducător Nicolae Ceauşescu was 71 when executed)
- Somalia (President Siad Barre was 71 when overthrown)
- Vietnam (President Ho Chi Minh and General Secretary Lê Duẩn were both 79 at death, while General Secretary Nguyễn Phú Trọng was 80 at death, having also been president until age 76. For General Secretaries that survived their term, the vast majority of them retired in their seventies or higher. (Note: Đỗ Mười left office at 80, Nông Đức Mạnh left office at 70, Nguyễn Văn Linh left office at 75, while Trường Chinh left office at 79, leaving only Lê Khả Phiêu retiring at 69.))
- Yugoslavia (President and Marshal Josip Broz Tito was 87 at death)

On the sub-national level, Georgia's party head, Vasil Mzhavanadze, was 70 when forced out and his Lithuanian counterpart, Antanas Sniečkus, was 71 at death. Nowadays, Cuba has been characterized as a gerontocracy: "Although the population is now mainly black or mulatto and young, its rulers form a mainly white gerontocracy", The Economist wrote in 2008. Cuba's Fidel Castro had de facto ruled the country for nearly 50 years, effectively retiring in 2008 at the age of 82, although he remained the leader of the Communist Party of Cuba until 2011. He was replaced by his brother, Raúl Castro, who was 89 years old at the time of his own retirement.

==== China ====
Between 1982 and 1992, the Central Advisory Commission's power and authority often surpassed the Politburo Standing Committee of the Chinese Communist Party. It was quipped, "the 80-year-olds are calling meetings of 70-year-olds to decide which 60-year-olds should retire", as CMC chairman Deng Xiaoping did not retire until the age of 85 after forcing his predecessor Hua Guofeng to retire at age 60. Also, before that, CCP Chairman Mao Zedong died in office at the age of 82, NPCSC Chairman Zhu De died in office at the age of 89, his successors left office at 86 and 85, and acting state Chairman Dong Biwu was at the age of 88 when his office was abolished.

==== Soviet Union ====
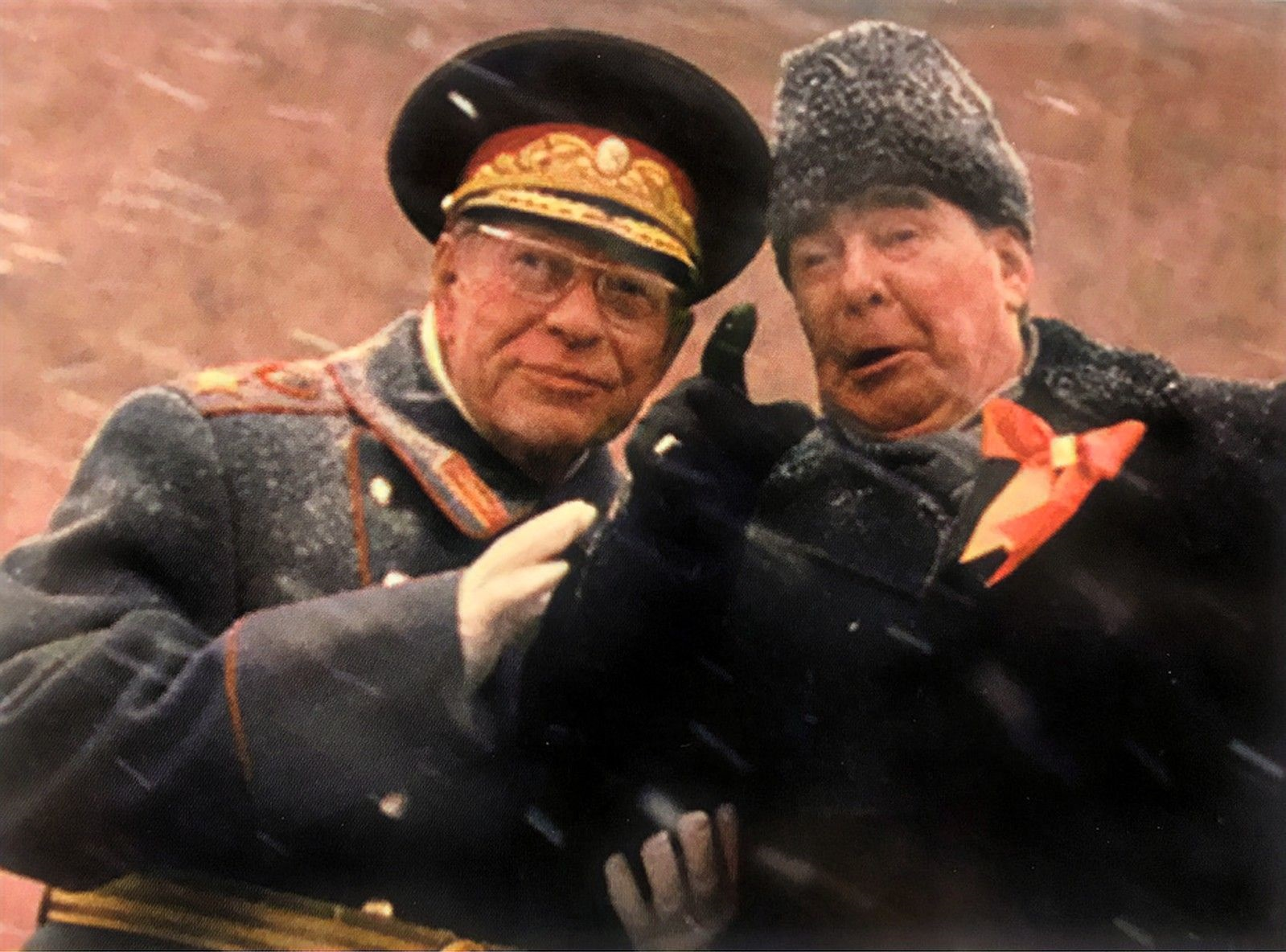
Leonid Brezhnev (then 72; right) and Dmitry Ustinov (then 71; left) at the 1979 Revolution Day Parade

In the Soviet Union, gerontocracy became increasingly entrenched starting in the 1970s; it was prevalent in the country until at least 1985, when a more dynamic and younger, ambitious leadership headed by Mikhail Gorbachev took power. Leonid Brezhnev, its foremost representative, died in 1982 aged 75, but had suffered a heart attack in 1975, after which generalized arteriosclerosis set in, so that he was progressively infirm and had trouble speaking. During his last two years he was essentially a figurehead. His premier, Alexei Kosygin, was 76 when he resigned in October 1980, by which time he was very ill and two months short of his death.

In 1980, the average Politburo member — generally a young survivor of the Great Purge who rose to power in the 1930s and 1940s — was 70 years old (as opposed to 55 in 1952 and 61 in 1964), and by 1982, Brezhnev's minister of foreign affairs, Andrei Gromyko; his minister of defense, Dmitriy Ustinov; and his premier, Nikolai Tikhonov (who succeeded Kosygin), were all in their mid-to-late seventies, and his first vice president, Vasily Kuznetsov, was already in his eighties. Yuri Andropov, Brezhnev's 68-year-old successor, was seriously ill with kidney disease when he took over, and after his death fifteen months later, he was succeeded by Konstantin Chernenko, then 72, who lasted thirteen months before his death and replacement with Gorbachev. Chernenko became the third Soviet leader to die in less than three years, and, upon being informed in the middle of the night of his death, U.S. President Ronald Reagan, who was seven months older than Chernenko and just over three years older than his predecessor Andropov, is reported to have remarked, "How am I supposed to get anyplace with the Russians if they keep dying on me?"

=== Brazil ===
Two days after Lula's victory in the 2026 Brazilian election, Lula celebrated his 81st birthday.

Luiz Inácio Lula da Silva (born 1945) has been the subject of discussion about age in politics, as he is the oldest person to have served as President of Brazil. He was elected to a third non-consecutive term at age 77, and in October 2025, at age 80, he announced that he would seek a fourth term in the 2026 election, dismissing concerns about his age. Before the 2022 election, Lula had said it would be his last campaign, citing both his age and a need for political renewal.

During the campaign, Lula publicised his physical fitness in an effort to ease voter concerns, which some compared to those surrounding Joe Biden's age and withdrawal from the 2024 race. A political consultant told the AP that Brazil's ageing population gives older voters growing weight: the number of eligible voters over 60 rose from 20.8 million in 2010 to 36.2 million in March 2026, roughly a quarter of the electorate. Commentators in the United States also criticised his candidacy on the grounds of age.

Lula defeated Flávio Bolsonaro in the 25 October 2026 runoff with about 52 percent of the valid vote, and is due to begin his fourth term on 5 January 2027, aged 81.

=== India ===
In the Indian state of Tamil Nadu, the government headed by 87-year-old state chief minister M. Karunanidhi was another example of gerontocracy. In another Indian state, West Bengal, CPI(M) founder Jyoti Basu was 86 years old when he stepped down as chief minister of the state in November 2000 after more than 23 years in office, but he remained a member of the Politburo until April 2008 and then served as a special invitee to it until his death in 2010. He remained an influential figure in the party and in national politics after his retirement.

=== Italy ===
Present-day Italy is often considered a gerontocracy, even in the internal Italian debate. Former Italian prime minister Mario Monti was 70 when he left office. The Monti government had the highest average age in the western world at 64 years, with its youngest members being 57. His immediate predecessor, Silvio Berlusconi, was 75 at the time of resignation in 2011. The previous head of the government Romano Prodi was nearly 69 when he stepped down in 2008. Italian president Sergio Mattarella is 85, while his predecessors Giorgio Napolitano and Carlo Azeglio Ciampi were 89 and 85 respectively when they left office. This trend has been disrupted in recent years, with Matteo Renzi becoming prime minister at age 39 in 2014, and Giorgia Meloni assuming the office at age 45 in 2022. As of 2014, the average age of Italian university professors is 63, of bank directors and chief executive officers 67, of members of parliament 56, and of labor union representatives 59.

=== Japan ===
Modern Japan has been described as a gerontocracy (or "silver democracy") and "generationally unjust, partially a product of the country's severely ageing population."

=== Malaysia ===
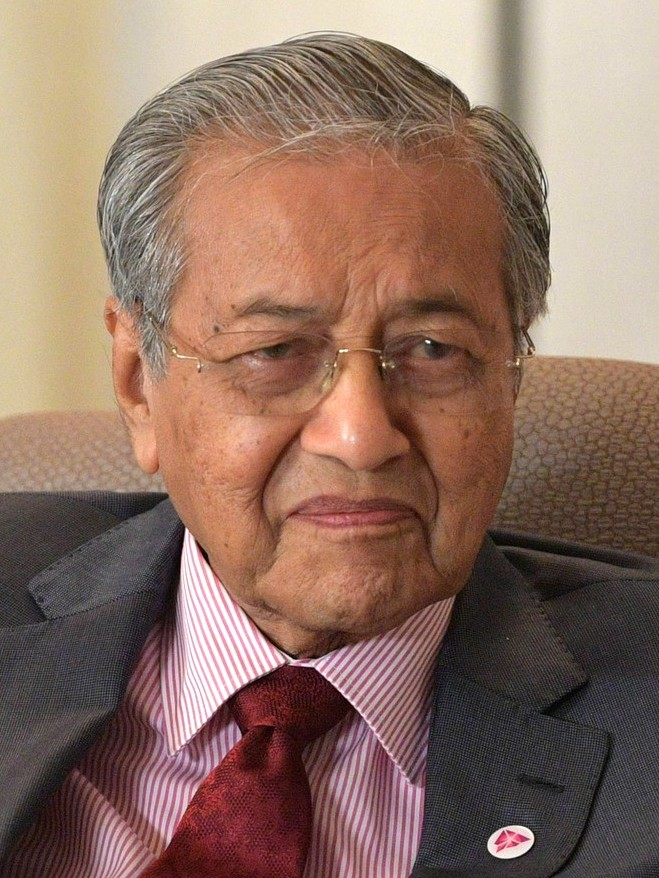
Mahathir Mohamad became the world's oldest serving state leader (aged 92 years, 304 days at the time) and was also officially recognized by Guinness World Records as the world's oldest serving prime minister.

Malaysia’s political landscape is dominated by ageing leaders, with key figures well into their seventies, eighties and even nineties - notably, Mahathir Mohamad, who after serving 22 years as prime minister from 1981 to 2003, returned to the office at the age of 93 following the 2018 Malaysian general election, and then contested in the 2022 Malaysian general election at the age of 97. Mahathir's successor as Prime Minister in 2020, Muhyiddin Yassin (8th prime minister) took office when he was 72 years, 291 days old, and Anwar Ibrahim (10th prime minister) took office at the age of 75 years, 106 days. The median age in Malaysia is 30, while the average politician is around 60, and most top leaders of the main political parties like PKR, Bersatu, PAS, UMNO are older men.

=== Roman Republic ===
The Roman Republic was originally an example; the word senate is related to the Latin word senex, meaning "old man". Cicero wrote: "They wouldn't make use of running or jumping or spears from afar or swords up close, but rather wisdom, reasoning, and thought, which, if they weren't in old men, our ancestors wouldn't have called the highest council the senate."

=== Stateless societies ===
In Kenya, Samburu society is said to be a gerontocracy. The power of elders is linked to the belief in their curse, underpinning their monopoly over arranging marriages and taking on further wives. This is at the expense of unmarried younger men, whose development up to the age of thirty is in a state of social suspension, prolonging their adolescent status. The paradox of Samburu gerontocracy is that popular attention focuses on the glamour and deviant activities of these footloose bachelors, which extend to a form of gang warfare, widespread suspicions of adultery with the wives of older men, and theft of their stock.

American Indian elders and Australian Aboriginal elders are traditional figures of wisdom and authority in many Native American and Aboriginal cultures.

=== Theocracies ===
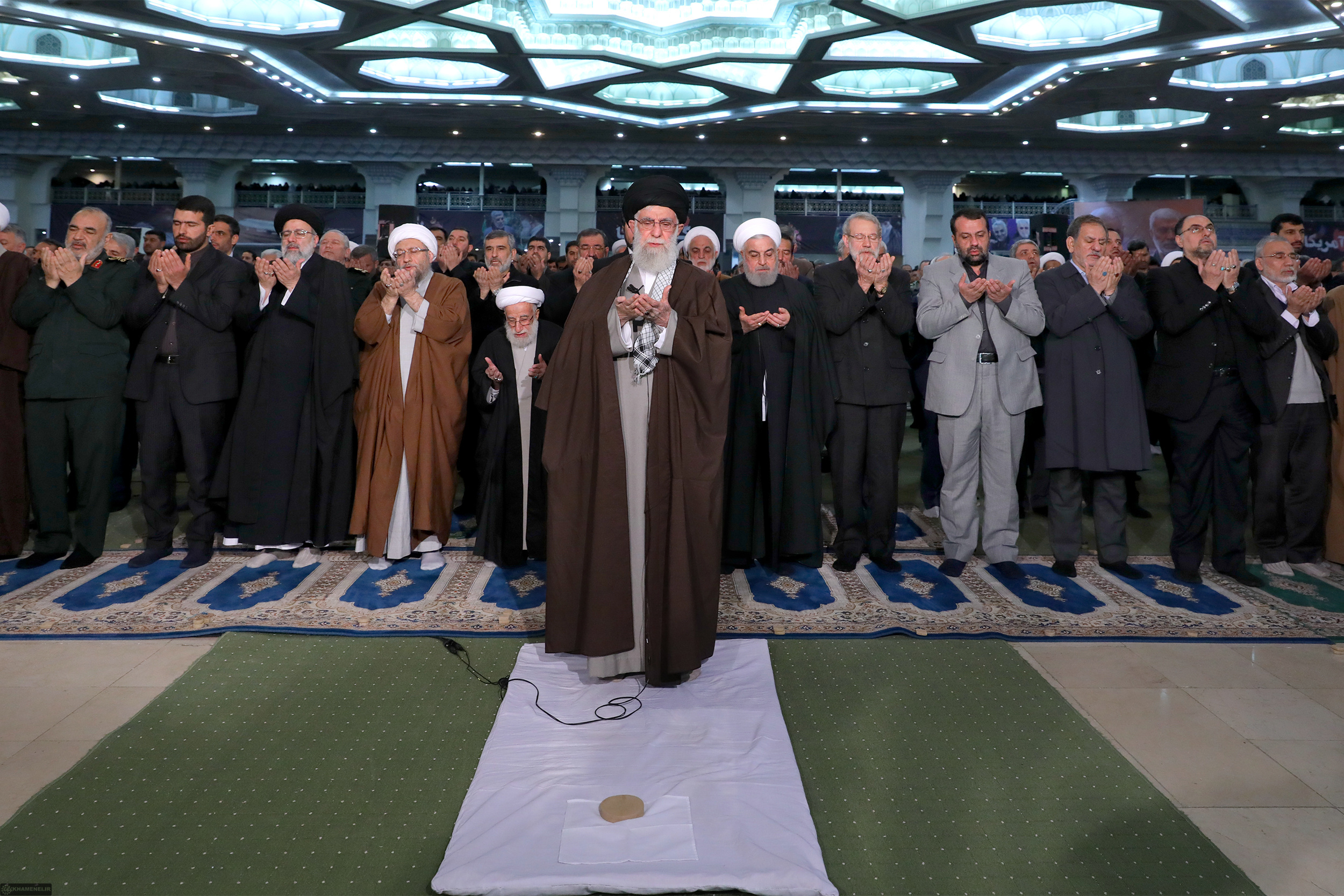
Supreme Leader of Iran Ali Khamenei was 81 years old during this Friday service in 2020.

Theocratic states and religious organizations, in which leadership is concentrated in the hands of religious elders can be considered gerontocracies, as in the cases of Iran, Saudi Arabia, the Vatican and the Church of Jesus Christ of Latter-day Saints. In Iran, parliamentary candidates must be under 75, despite the ages of senior religious leaders. Saudi Arabia, nominally a theocratic monarchy, has been likened to various late communist states, ruled by gerontocrats. The first king, Ibn Saud, and all subsequent kings from among his children held rule along with many elder clerics. Since 2017, however, power has become concentrated by Mohammed bin Salman, aged 31 when he was appointed crown prince of Saudi Arabia by his father, king Salman. MBS, as his name is often abbreviated, has sidelined powerful, older members of the Saudi family.

=== United States ===
In comparison to other countries, politicians in the United States are uniquely old. The observation of gerontocracy in the United States has been a subject of frequent criticism. A 2025 study examining why the US stands out in this regard found limited or inconsistent evidence for potential explanations such as greater public demand for older candidates, demographics-related explanations, or the role of US electoral institutions, while finding evidence indicating that the US system of campaign finance favored older candidates for public office.

==== Presidency ====
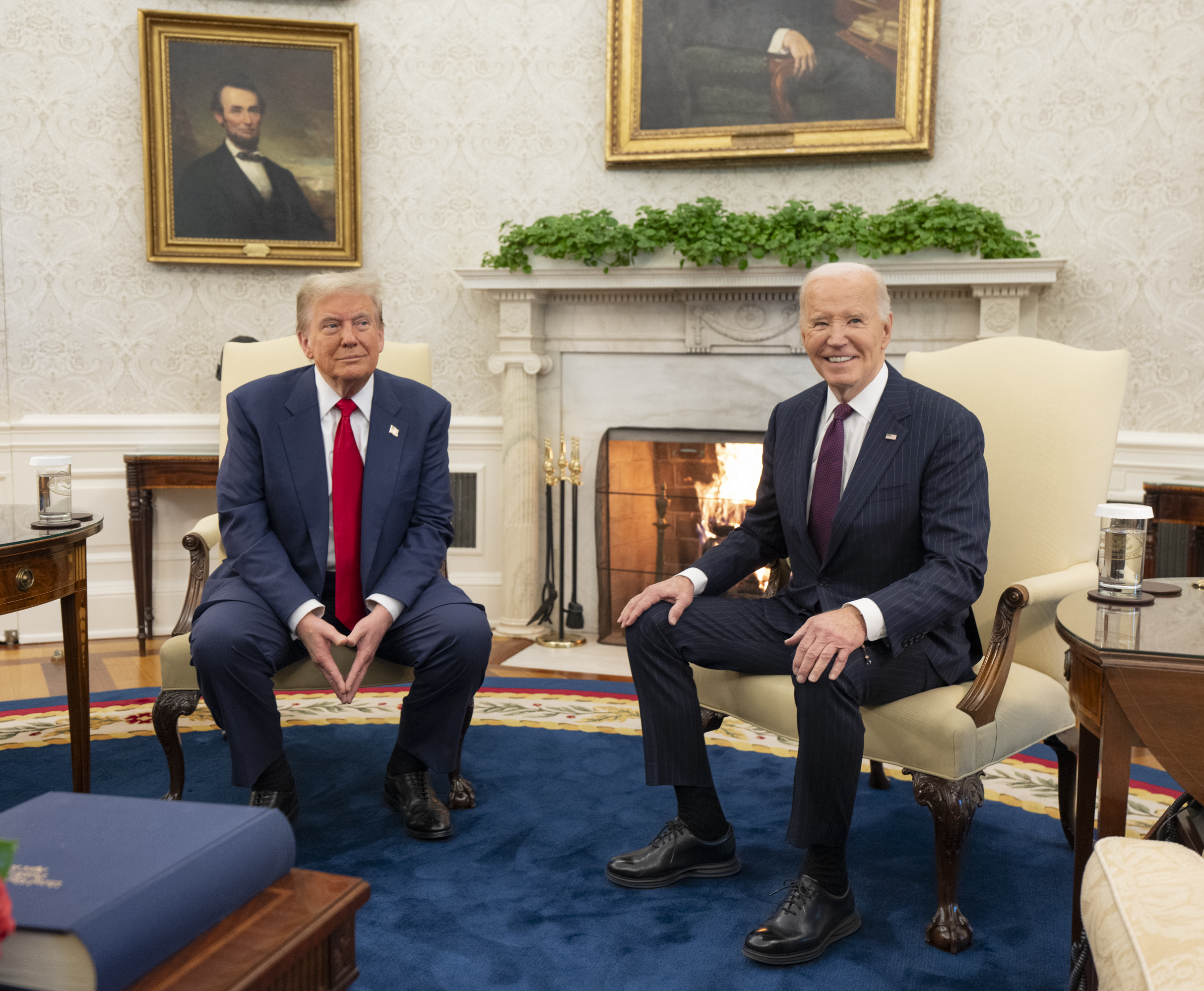
Donald Trump and Joe Biden, the oldest people inaugurated as President of the United States

Under presidents Donald Trump (born 1946) and Joe Biden (born 1942), the U.S. government has been described as a gerontocracy. In 2016, Trump was the oldest person ever to be inaugurated president, at age 70. In 2020, Biden was inaugurated at the age of 78 years and two months. After his second inauguration in 2024, Trump was again the oldest person inaugurated as president, at 78 years, seven months, and six days old.

Biden's age was a subject of concern during his presidency and especially his reelection campaign, culminating in his withdrawal on 21 July 2024. Biden served as the oldest president at the end of his tenure, beating Ronald Reagan's record of 77; he was 82 years and two months old by the end of his term in 2025, making him the first president to turn 80 while in office. Assuming he serves until the end of his term, Trump will be the new record holder at 82 years, seven months, and six days old. In turn, Trump's reelection sparked renewed concerns about his own age. (Note: Attributed to multiple sources:)

==== Congress ====
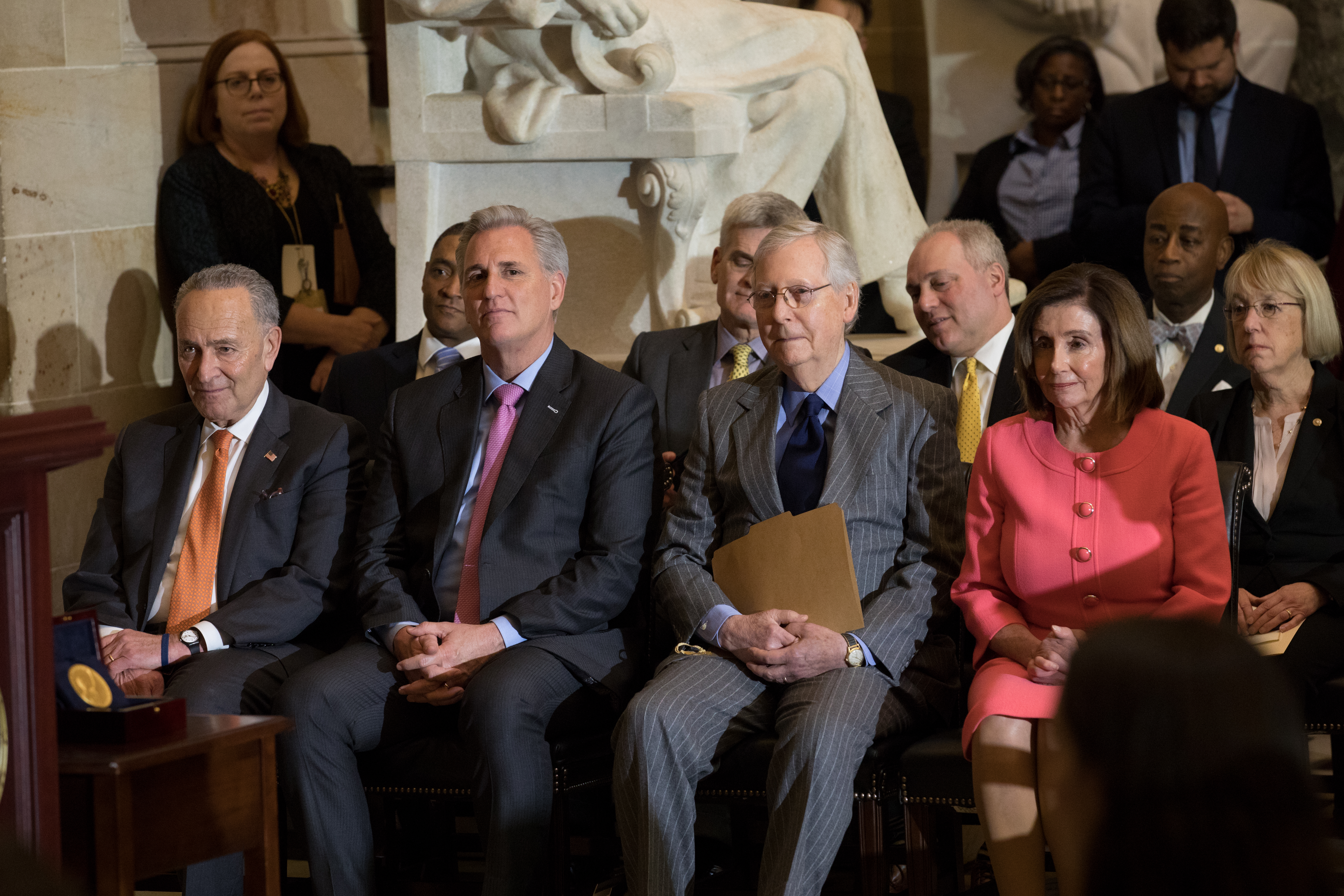
Chuck Schumer, Kevin McCarthy, Mitch McConnell and Nancy Pelosi in 2020

Over decades, the age distribution of members of the US Congress has trended toward older individuals.

Though the age difference between incoming and departing senators in 2027 was nearly 15 years, the overall average age declined less than a year because of the aging of those continuing their terms.

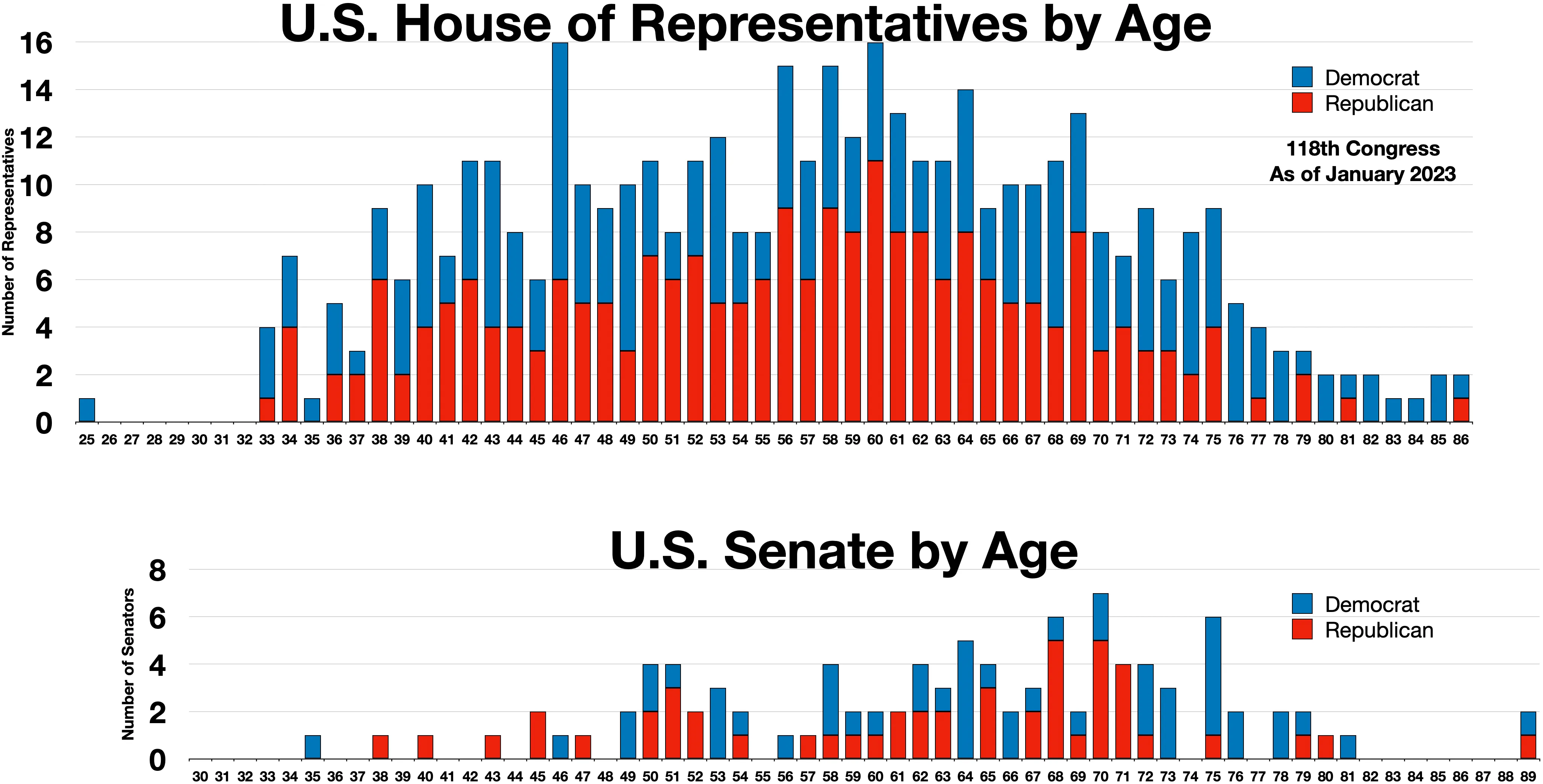
118th Congress Number of representatives by age

Nancy Pelosi (born 1940), the speaker of the House of Representatives from 2019 to 2023, and Mitch McConnell (born 1942), the Senate majority leader from 2015 to 2021, were both the oldest holders of their offices in U.S. history. At 87 years old in 2020, senators Dianne Feinstein and Chuck Grassley were both the oldest members of Congress. Feinstein ultimately died in office three years later at the age of 90.

In 2021, the average age of a senator was 64, and positions of power within the legislatures — such as chairmanships of various committees — are usually bestowed upon the more experienced, that is, older, members of the legislature. Strom Thurmond, a U.S. senator from South Carolina, left office at age 100 after almost half a century in the body, while Robert Byrd of West Virginia was born in 1917 and served in the Senate from 1959 to his death in 2010 at age 92. Both Thurmond and Byrd had served as president pro tempore of the Senate, a position that is third in the presidential line of succession and is now held by Chuck Grassley (born 1933).

On 20 December 2024, conservative news website Dallas Express published an article titled "Where Is Congresswoman Kay Granger?", in reference to the Republican congresswoman from Texas. Granger was 81 years old at the time of publishing and had not voted in the House since 24 July 2024; she was seldom seen in public but did attend a portrait-unveiling ceremony honoring her time on the House Appropriations Committee in November. Granger was reported to have been living in an assisted living facility due to cognitive decline and her son confirmed she had "dementia issues." Granger had previously confirmed in 2023 that she would not run for re-election in 2024 and stepped down from her role as Appropriations Chair on 10 April 2024. Granger died about two years later on 2 August 2026.

Less than six months into the 119th Congress, three Democratic representatives had died, all in their seventies. Both Raúl Grijalva and Gerry Connolly had stated before their deaths that they would not run, while Sylvester Turner had only been in the House since November 2024, replacing another representative who died.

=== Other countries ===
In Medieval England, aldermen (literally "elder men") were local political leaders second to a mayor. The title is still used in some countries colonized by the British Empire, such as the U.S., Canada, Australia and South Africa.

During the 2010–2012 Arab Spring, every state in North Africa which experienced a revolution had a leader in their late sixties or older; president Hosni Mubarak was 82 when he resigned during the Egyptian revolution, president Zine El Abidine Ben Ali of Tunisia was 74 when he fled into exile, (Note: Tunisia's gerontocratic tradition is independent of the Arab Spring; in 1987, Ben Ali deposed 84-year-old president Habib Bourgiba, who in turn had deposed 75-year-old king Lamine Bey of the Husainid dynasty, whose head is always the oldest male member, and subsequent president Beji Caid Essebsi died in office at 92.) and Libyan leader Muammar Gaddafi was 69 when he was assassinated. Additionally, during the second wave of Arab protests in the late 2010s, president Abdelaziz Bouteflika of Algeria was 82 when forced out, prime minister Adil Abdul-Mahdi of Iraq was 77 when he resigned, and president Omar al-Bashir of Sudan was 75 when deposed.

Similarly to the Arab Spring, gerontocratic tendencies are also observable in states affected by the Gen Z protests. In Bangladesh, prime minister Sheikh Hasina was 76 when she was ousted in the non-cooperation movement. In turn, Muhammad Yunus was 84 when he succeeded Hasina. Earlier Bangladeshi leaders who left office in their 70s or higher include prime minister Ataur Rahman Khan (at 75) and president Iajuddin Ahmed (at 78, having also been Chief Adviser until age 76). Meanwhile, Sri Lanka saw the resignation of prime minister Mahinda Rajapaksa at age 76 and president Gotabaya Rajapaksa at 72, South Korea saw the impeachment of president Yoon Suk Yeol at 64, France saw prime minister François Bayrou resign at 74, Nepal saw prime minister K. P. Sharma Oli resign at 73, and Peru saw the impeachment of president Dina Boluarte at 63 and the appointment of president José María Balcázar at 83 (following the censure and removal of 39-year-old president José Jerí). Prior to the Gen Z protests, Peruvian president Alberto Fujimori was also impeached in 2000 at age 62.

== Organizational examples ==
Outside the political sphere, gerontocracy may be observed in other institutional hierarchies of various kinds. Generally the mark of a gerontocracy is the presence of a substantial number of septuagenarian or octogenarian leaders—those younger than this are too young for the label to be appropriate, while those older than this have generally been too few in number to dominate the leadership. The rare centenarian who has retained a position of power is generally by far the oldest in the hierarchy.

Gerontocracy generally occurs as a phase in the development of an entity, rather than being part of it throughout its existence. Opposition to gerontocracy may cause weakening or elimination of this characteristic by instituting things like term limits or mandatory retirement ages.

Judges of the United States courts, for example, serve for life, but a system of incentives to retire at full pay after a given age and disqualification from leadership has been instituted. The International Olympic Committee instituted a mandatory retirement age in 1965, and Pope Paul VI removed the right of cardinals to vote for a new pope once they reached the age of 80, which was to limit the number of cardinals that would vote for the new Pope, due to the proliferation of cardinals that was occurring at the time and is continuing to occur (when Paul died there were 15 cardinals over 80 compared to 114 young enough to be electors while when Pope Francis died there were 117 cardinals over 80 compared to 135 young enough to be electors).

Gerontocracy may emerge in an institution not initially known for it. The Ramakrishna Order and Church of Christ (Latter Day Saints) were both founded by young men (Note: Vivekananda and Swami Brahmananda were both 23 when they led the Disciples of Ramakrishna in taking monastic vows after his death, and Joseph Smith was 24 when he incorporated the Church.) but soon evolved enduring seniority-based succession systems with the result that in 2026 the successor organizations are led by men (Swami Gautamananda, its seventh nonagenarian president and Dallin H. Oaks, the ninth man to serve as president, and third to accede past age 90) who did not even accede to their respective presidencies until their nineties.

== See also ==
- Ageism
- Age of candidacy
- Bump (union)
- Cronyism
- Gerontophobia
- Intergenerational equity
- List of countries by median age
- List of state leaders by age
  - List of longest-living state leaders
  - List of oldest living state leaders
- Lockstep compensation
- Public participation (decision making)
- Youth suffrage
