= Shukko =

Form of job transfer in Japanese companies

Shukko (出向, from 出る meaning 'to leave' and 向う meaning 'to go towards') is a form of job transfer occurring in Japanese companies. A shukko most often stands for a transfer of an employee from a main branch of a company to a branch office of the same company or an associated company. Rarely, it might be towards a non-affiliated company.

The main characteristic of the so-called “Japanese style of business administration” is lifetime employment (or 終身雇用). Shukko has a key role in the support and sustainment of this Japanese style of long-term employment.

In Japan, Shukko has a negative reputation because it is often used as a way to reduce personnel expenses. However, Shukko has positive aspects – cases in which it is used as a way to give employees the chance to gather corporate experience and broaden their careers.

== Types of Shukko ==
Each company makes their own conditions for Shukko.

=== Demotion ===
This type is the main reason for the negative reputation of Shukko, because of its effect on personnel expenses. The Nenko System (seniority-based compensation) is the opposite of the merit-based wage system. Because pay is based solely on seniority, employees' salaries may not correspond with their job performance or ability.
