= Nenko =

Nenko may refer to:

- Nenko system of Japanese employee promotion
- Nenko Balkanski (1907–1977), Bulgarian artist
- Nenko Dobrev (born 1946), Bulgarian rowing coxswain
- Nenko Hranov (1850–1936), Bulgarian freedom fighter and National Assembly member
