= Child care indicator =

Child care indicators are sets of standards that act as indicators of quality child care. These standards are developed by governments, child care experts, pediatricians, and parent advocacy groups. This information is useful for parents who are seeking quality child care and for directors and staff working in child care settings for ensuring quality settings and programs.

== Description ==
Indicators of quality child care include ratios of staff to children, Childhood experiences in quality child care settings have been linked to positive development and experiences later in life. Barriers for access to quality child care have also been identified. Cross-national comparisons regarding costs and participation in child care programs have been reported on. In recent years, Early Childhood Education and Care (ECEC) has been included by the United Nations as a target in their Millennium Development Goals project and has been identified by the Organisation for Economic Co-operation and Development (OECD) as an important area for future policy development.

== Standards of quality ==
Sets of child care indicators have developed globally and in some cases, nationally. While no universally accepted list of indicators or standards exists, some of the indicators that are largely accepted for quality child care are:

- Adequate supervision
- Hand washing and diapering policies
- Director qualifications
- Lead teacher qualifications
- Ratio and group size
- Immunization policies
- Toxic substances policies
- Emergency plans
- Fire drills
- Child abuse reporting policies
- Medications policies
- Staff training/first aid
- Playground safety

== Positive development ==
ECEC provides children with the necessary cognitive, social, and emotional skills for learning in the future. Quality child care that is guided by indicators provides play opportunities and activities that are designed for practicing these skills. Providing families with opportunities to access quality child care provides a basis for sustainable development and improved individual performance over time, for both children and parents.

== Barriers ==
Quality child care is not consistently available currently. Some of the barriers to quality child care include:

- Funding - Public funding for child care is not distributed equally for all child care centers. Centers with less funding have less access to the tools required to meet the standards for quality child care.
- Licensing and regulation - Some areas lack governance that requires child care facilities to operate according to recognized standards
- Child care providers - Educators do not consistently receive adequate compensation for their work. Some do not have access to educational tools to provide them with ongoing training and skills development.
- Lack of guidelines for curriculum development - ECEC is not consistently delivered and does not benefit children and families equally

In North America, no federal regulations for indicators or standards have been developed that would address these barriers consistently.
