= Musical chairs =

Elimination genre party game

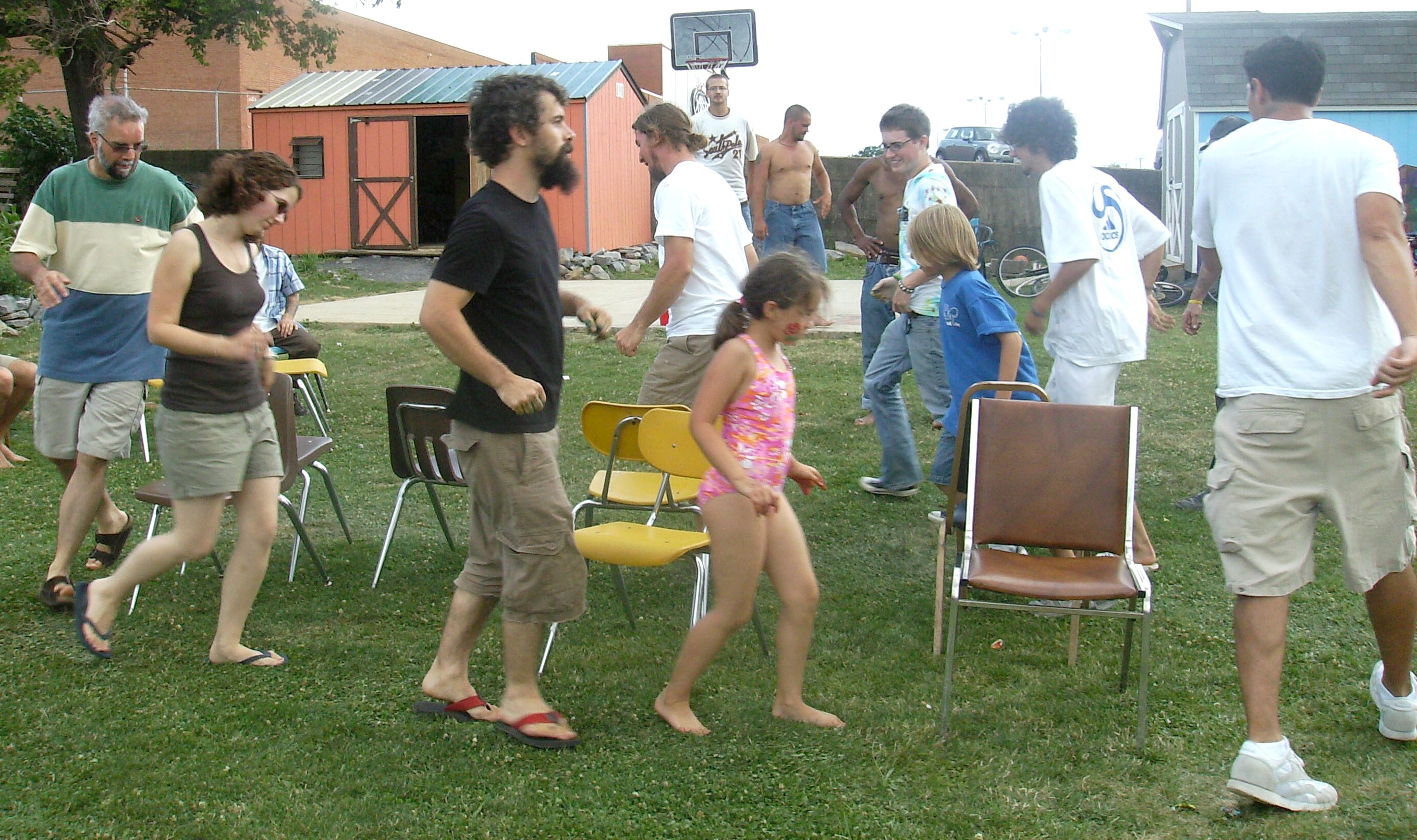
- Musical chairs being played at a party
- Players: Variable
- Setup time: Variable
- Playing time: Variable
- Chance: Music stoppage may seem random to players, but is under the control of the leader
- Age range: Usually children
- Skills: Quick reaction time

Musical chairs is a game of elimination involving players, chairs, and music. It is a staple of many parties worldwide.

== Gameplay ==
A set of chairs is arranged in a circle with one fewer chair than the number of players (i.e. nine players would use eight chairs). While music plays, the contestants walk around the set of chairs. When the music stops abruptly, all players must find their own individual chair to sit on. The player who fails to sit on a chair is eliminated. One chair is then removed for the next round, and the process repeats until only one player remains and is declared the winner.

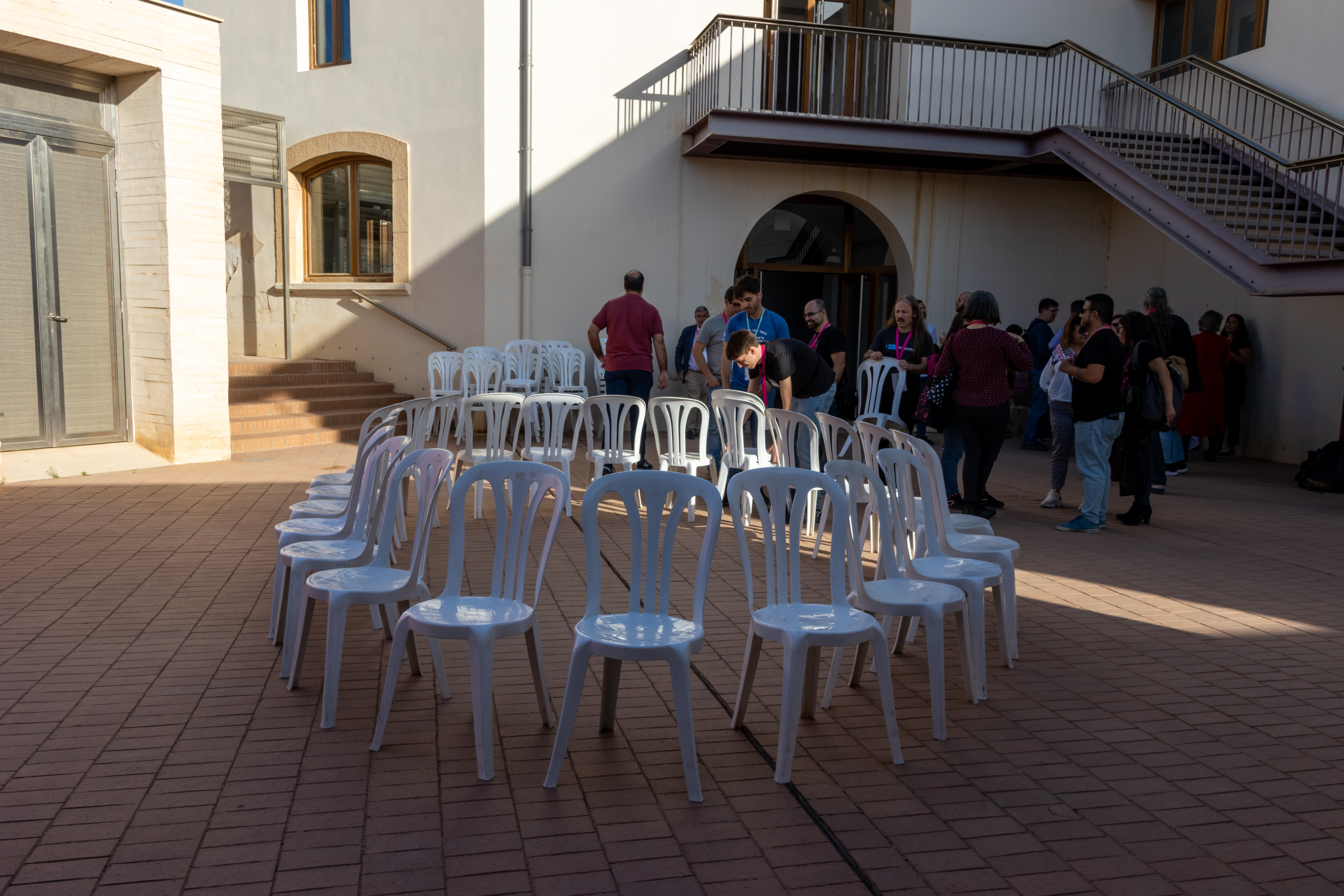
Before the game

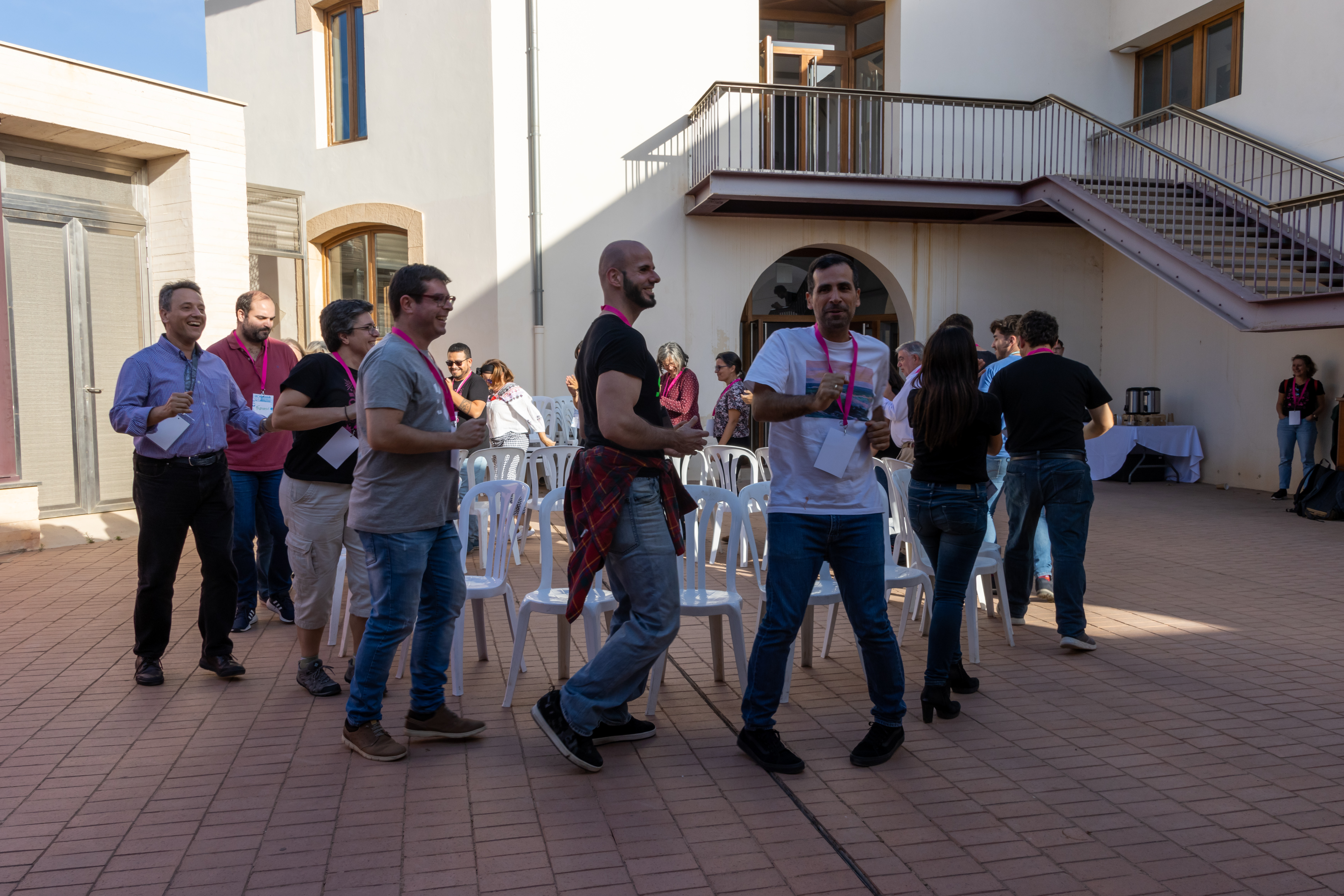
Starting the game

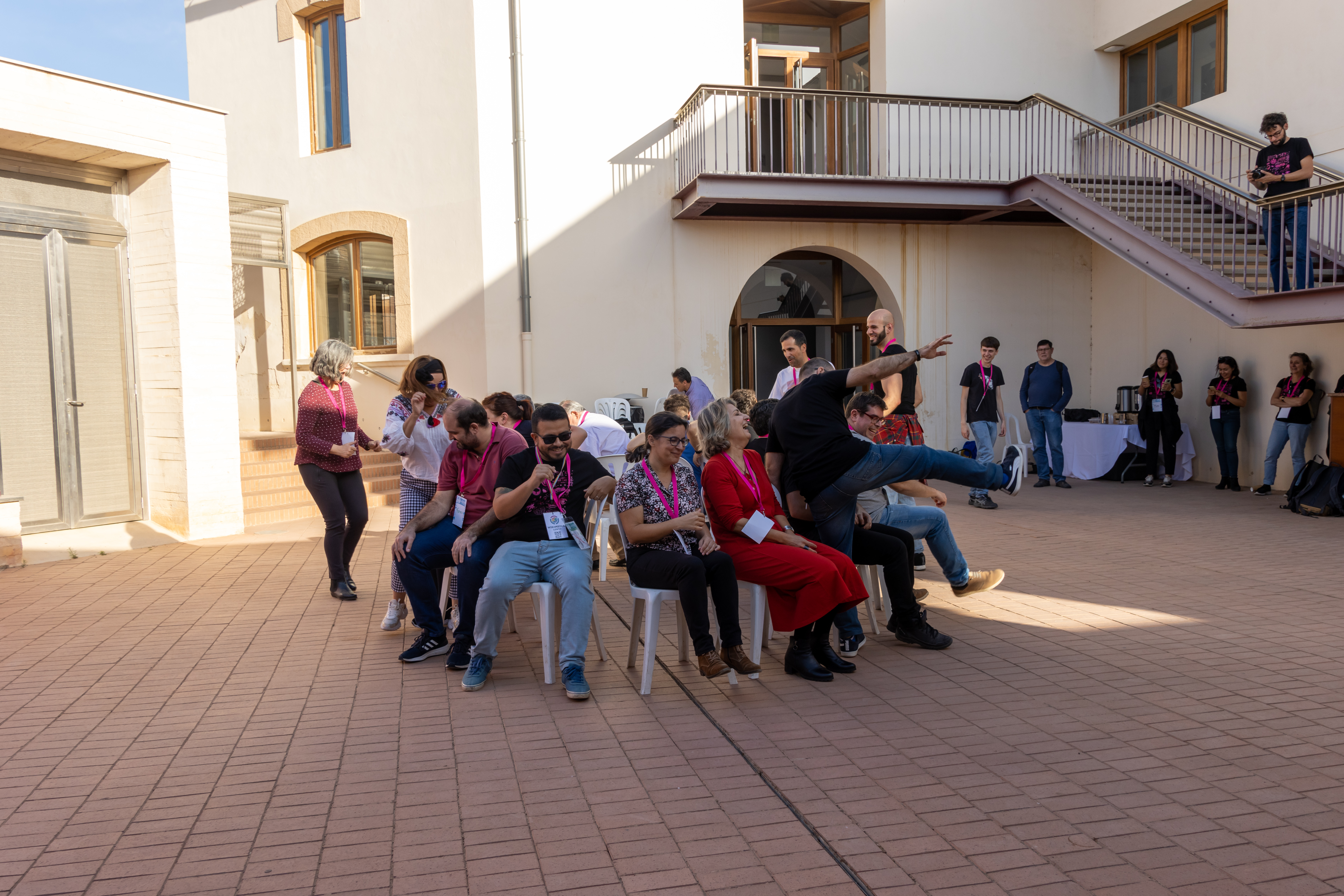
Reducing numbers

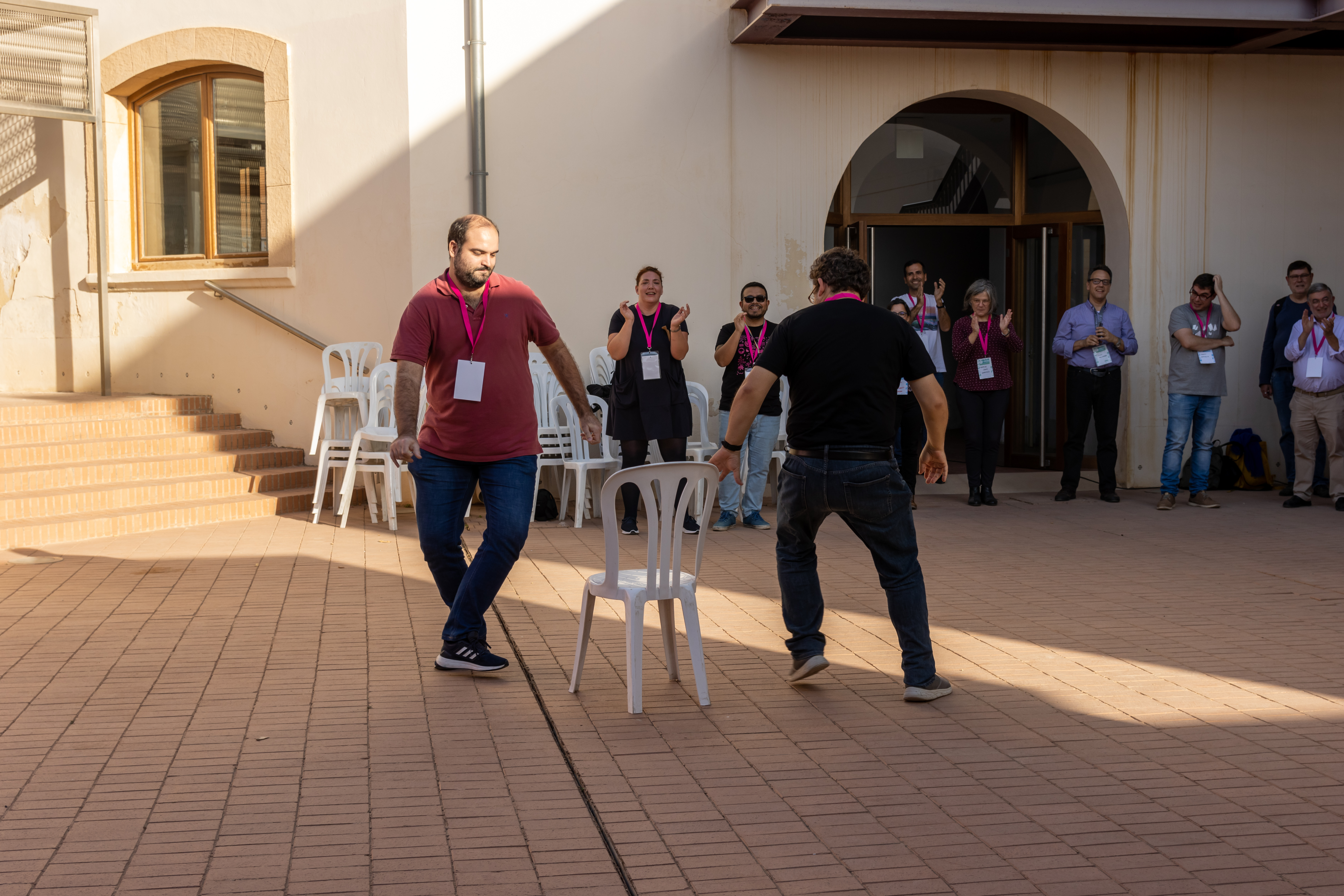
Down to the last two

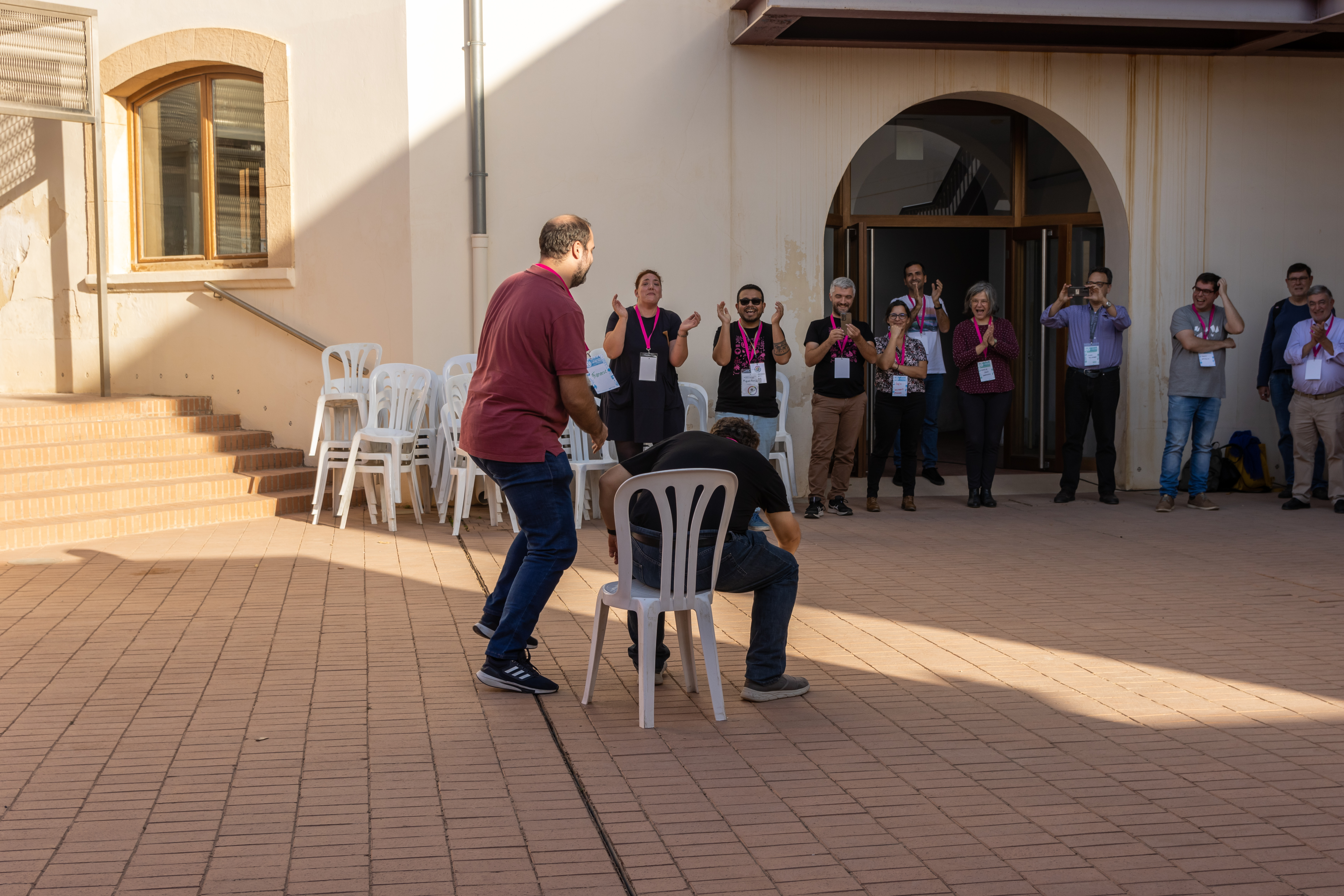
A winner!

== History ==
The origins of musical chairs are uncertain, though the elimination format — players circling seats and scrambling for one when a signal stops — appears in more than one cultural tradition. In southern India, a game called khambada gadane ("grabbing the pillar") has been documented since at least the 14th century; players circle temple pillars or posts and rush to claim one when a drumbeat or other cue stops, with one player eliminated each round.

In Europe, musical chairs developed as a parlor game during the Victorian era, typically played at Christmas gatherings. The Oxford English Dictionary dates the earliest published use of the term to the 1870s, citing Cassell's Family Magazine (1877). The game was also known in English as "Going to Jerusalem," reflecting the German Reise nach Jerusalem.

By the early 20th century, the game had become a fixture of children's parties across Europe and North America.

== History of the name ==
The origins of the game's name as "Trip to Jerusalem" is disputed. However, it is known to come from its German name Reise nach Jerusalem ("Journey to Jerusalem"). One theory suggests that the name was inspired by the Crusades, wherein several heavy losses were incurred. Another theory suggests that it was inspired by the immigration of Jews from the diaspora to Palestine, wherein it is stated that spaces on ships taking the Jews to the said land were limited. None of these theories have been confirmed.

== As metaphor ==
The term "playing musical chairs" is also a metaphor for describing any activity where items or people are repeatedly and usually pointlessly shuffled among various locations or positions. It can also refer to a condition where people have to expend time searching for a resource, such as having to travel from one gasoline station to another when there is a shortage. It may also refer to political situations where one leader replaces another, only to be rapidly replaced due to the instability of the governing system (see cabinet reshuffle).

== In popular culture ==
The game is featured in the original incarnation of the Andrew Lloyd Webber musical, Evita, during the number "The Art of the Possible", wherein it serves as a symbolic metaphor of Juan Perón's rise to power. In this sequence, Peron and a number of military officers play the game, which the former wins.

The game is used on the lenten special of Sunday PinaSaya entitled "Trip to Jerusalem" aired on GMA Network on April 9, 2017. It featured the young girl Jessie (played by Barbie Forteza).

== See also ==
- Buggins' turn
- Chinese fire drill
- Hot desking
- Level-coil
- Aliyah
- Oh Sit!, a game show based on musical chairs
