= Auncienty =

Auncienty is a term used to describe a system of precedence, for instance through years and continuance in the Houses of the Inns of Court, or among the ranks or degrees of the Officers of Arms. In many ways equivalent to Eldership, deriving from the Norman French noun "ancien" (meaning an Elder) preserved in the French concept of Ancienneté, it has a meaning of ceremonial seniority. This is slightly distinct from the obsolete usage of the word simply to mean "Antiquity".

== Inns of Court ==
Sir William Dugdale, in his Origines Juridiciales, mentioned this as follows:

"...in the graund Vacation time, out of the Four Houses of Court, come two and two to every House of Chancery; and there according to their years and continuance of the House that they be of, which they call auncienty, they doe argue and reason to some doubtfull matter, that is proposed, so that the most youngest doth begyn, and the next to him in continuance doth follow; and at last he that readeth to that House of Chancery doth declare his opinion in the matter that is called into question."

Of the governance of the Inner Temple, Dugdale remarks:

"...it was ordered that if any then, or thenceforth of this Society, should be called to the Bench, at that time being, or that thereafter should be a Knight, that notwithstanding such his dignity of Knighthood, he should take place at the Bench Table according to his auncienty in the House, and no otherwise."

Further (concerning the Middle Temple): "The Benchers of this Society are divided into two several ranks or Classes, viz. the upper Classis consisting of the Auncienty, and the lower of the Puisnes."

Similarly, as a mark of elder status, the Black Books of Lincoln's Inn refer to the "Double Readers or Auncient Benchers" (as opposed to the Middle Benchers or the Puisne Benchers); "from hencefourth if any chamber within this House shall fall voide, the auncientest Bencher shall make choice of it"; and the governance of Furnival's Inn and of Thavie's Inn is described (for each) as being under "the Principal and Auncients."

At Gray's Inn, the progress towards admission to the "grand company of Ancients", their prerogatives and responsibilities, are described in the published editions of their archives.

== Officers of Arms ==
In the Orders given by Thomas Duke of Norfolk, Earl Marshal, to the Officers of Arms in 1568, terms of precedency are set out for arrangements for heraldic funerals. In Section 8 (Burials appropriate to Garter Principal King of Arms): "... And it is further ordered that hee the said Garter shall take to serve with him at the funerals of the aforesaid Noble and honourable personages, first Clarenceux and then Norroy Kings of Armes, and soe successively one after another the Heraulds and Pursuivants of Arms in order according to their auncienty and degree in Office and soe to beginne againe"; and in Section 9 (Burials appropriate to Clarenceux King of Arms and Norroy King of Arms): "... And the said Clarenceux and Norroy shall take to serve with them at the said funeralls as occasion shall serve and the place require, other the Heraulds and Pursuivants of Armes successively one after another in order according to their auncienty and degree in Office".

== Worshipful Companies ==
William Camden, Clarenceux, in confirming the 1456 grant of arms to the Worshipful Company of Tallow Chandlers of London in 1602, wrote: "...the comunaltyes, Brotherhoods and Companyes of every faculty and Mistery in famous Townes and Cittyes, haue likewise byn distinguished the one from the other, and accordingly marshalled, and placed with their Banners, Standards and Pennons in all publike feasts, and other solempne assemblyes as their worthynes and auncienty did require." "...and that it shall be lawfull for them to use, beare, and shewe forth the same in their ensignes, Banners, Pennons and streamers, at all tymes, and in all places both by water and land, as hath byn accustomed, and to take their place, after their auncienty at all feasts and other solempne proceedings as the xvijth company of this honorable Cittye which I fynde according to the date of their Pattent to be aunciently recorded."

== Titles and descent ==
The statute of Parliament confirming the restoration of the Earldom of Ormond to James Butler, 9th Earl of Ormond in 35 Henry VIII (A.D. 1543) did so "in as ample manner and forme and with like preemynens and auncientie as any the abovenamed Erles of Ormond at any time had used or enjoyed."

The term occurs several times in the Letters Patent for the Limitation of the Crown issued in 1553, purporting to be the last will and testament of King Edward VI. Referring to the seniority of possible future heirs to the Crown of England and Ireland and of the King's title in France, it repeats the formula: "...to the heires males of the bodye of the said eldest sonne lawfully begotten, and so from sonne to sonne as he shalbe of auncientie in birth..." Here seniority is directly consequent upon age and legitimacy.
