= Bencher =

Senior member of an Inn of Court in England and Wales and Ireland

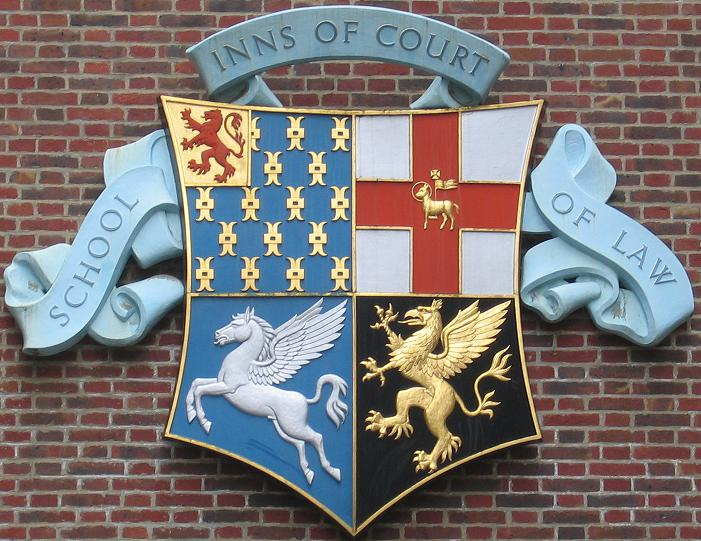
Combined arms of the four Inns of Court. Clockwise from top left: Lincoln's Inn, Middle Temple, Gray's Inn, Inner Temple.

A bencher or Master of the Bench is a senior member of an Inn of Court in England and Wales or the Inns of Court in Northern Ireland, or the Honorable Society of King's Inns in Ireland. Benchers hold office for life once elected. A bencher can be elected while still a barrister (usually, but not always, King's Counsel in the UK or Senior Counsel in Ireland), in recognition of the contribution that the barrister has made to the life of the Inn or to the law. Others become benchers as a matter of course when appointed as a High Court judge. The Inn may elect non-members as honorary benchers – for example, distinguished judges and lawyers from other countries, eminent non-lawyers or (in the English Inns) members of the British royal family, who become known as "Royal Benchers" once elected.

One member of each Inn is the Treasurer, a position which is held for one year only. While succession to the post of Treasurer was once dependent purely on seniority (or auncienty), this is no longer the case. The Treasurer is now elected. Two Readers are also elected each year.

== Etymology ==
Historically, the most junior student barristers were only permitted to watch moot court trials and stood within the bar of the moot courtroom. More qualified barristers (known in England as "outer" or "utter" barristers) were permitted to join the argument and stood outside the bar. The most senior barristers were permitted to sit on the bench at moots. This third class of barristers became known as "Benchers" or "Masters of the Bench".

== England usage ==
The practices and regulations vary from Inn to Inn, but the benchers are the ultimate governing body of the relevant Inn. The benchers govern the finances of the Inn, and they alone have the authority to admit students, to call students to the bar, and to elect other benchers. Today, the benchers of the four English Inns have common standards agreed with the Bar Council. They have the formal power to discipline members of their Inn by suspending or expelling them from membership of the Inn, and by disbarring them. Disciplinary functions are now shared with the Council of the Inns of Court, the Bar Standards Board and its Complaints Committee (formerly known as the Professional Conduct and Complaints Committee).

== Ireland usage ==
The governing structure of King's Inns dates from the sixteenth century and are composed of "Benchers". Originally, the benchers were composed of the Lord Chancellor, judges and senior barristers. Today, benchers include elected Bar Benchers, Judicial Benchers (includes all judges of the Superior Courts) and Honorary Benchers and they have the power to conferring the degree of Barrister-at-Law, suspending or disbarring barristers and dealing with disciplinary matters.

== Canadian usage ==
The terms bencher and treasurer are in use by the legal profession in Canada. A bencher in the Canadian context is a member of the board of directors of a provincial law society. Most benchers are lawyers, but in some provinces there are also lay benchers who represent the public interest. In some provinces the head of the board is known as the treasurer. Paralegals are also elected as benchers, in those provinces where law societies govern their profession.

== See also ==
- Bench (law)
- Crossbencher
