= Trolls: The Beat Goes On! =

2018 Netflix original TV series

- Genre: Adventure; Fantasy; Musical; Comedy
- Based on: Trolls by DreamWorks Animation
- Developed by: Matthew Beans; Hannah Friedman; Sam Friedman
- Voices of: Skylar Astin; Amanda Leighton; Ron Funches; Kari Wahlgren; David Fynn; Sam Lerner; David Koechner; Sean T. Krishnan; Kevin Michael Richardson; Fryda Wolff; Walt Dohrn
- Theme music composer: Jeannie Lurie; Mia Minichiello; Matias Mora
- Opening theme: "Hair in the Air" by Kenz Hall and Skylar Astin
- Composers: Alex Geringas; Alana Da Fonseca (original songs)
- Country of origin: United States
- Original language: English
- No. of seasons: 8
- No. of episodes: 52 (list of episodes)

Production
- Executive producer: Matthew Beans
- Running time: 24 minutes
- Production company: DreamWorks Animation Television

Original release
- Network: Netflix
- Release: January 19, 2018 – November 22, 2019

Related
- Trolls: TrollsTopia

Trolls: The Beat Goes On! is an American animated television series produced by DreamWorks Animation Television. Based on the 3D computer-animated comedy musical film Trolls, the series ran in the United States on Netflix from January 19, 2018, to November 22, 2019, and takes place between the events of the first film and the sequel, Trolls World Tour. Amanda Leighton, Skylar Astin, Kari Wahlgren, Sam Lerner, David Kaye, David Fynn, Sean T. Krishnan, Kevin Michael Richardson, Matt Lowe, and Fryda Wolff provide the new voices for Queen Poppy, Branch, Bridget, King Gristle, King Peppy, Biggie and Mr. Dinkles, Guy Diamond, Smidge, Creek, DJ Suki and Satin & Chenille for this series respectively; only Ron Funches and Walt Dohrn reprise their roles as Cooper and Cloud Guy, also respectively.

Hannah Friedman, Sam Friedman, and Matthew Beans developed the series, with music from Alex Geringas and original songs by Alana Da Fonseca. The series ran for 52 episodes, split into eight seasons.

A new Trolls series called Trolls: TrollsTopia was released on Hulu on November 19, 2020. Following the end of Netflix's deal with DreamWorks, the entire series was removed from the platform on November 17, 2025, moving to Peacock.

== Plot ==
Following the events of the first film, Poppy and Branch go on daring misadventures with their friends while performing for all trollkind.

== Cast and characters ==
=== Main characters ===
- Amanda Leighton as Poppy, the queen of the Trolls
- Skylar Astin as Branch, a survivalist-like sage of Trolls and best friend of Poppy
- David Fynn as:
  - Biggie, a large Troll
  - Mr. Dinkles, Biggie's pet worm
- Fryda Wolff as:
  - DJ Suki, a Troll who uses DJ equipment made of insects
  - Satin and Chenille, conjoined twin Trolls with a flair for fashion design
- Ron Funches as Cooper, a giraffe-like Troll
- Sean T. Krishnan as Guy Diamond, a glittery Troll
- Kevin Michael Richardson as Smidge, a small and strong female Troll

=== Supporting characters ===
- David Kaye as Peppy, the former king of the Trolls and Poppy's father
- Sam Lerner as Gristle Jr., the king of the Bergens
- Kari Wahlgren as:
  - Bridget, a Bergen who is a former scullery maid, Gristle Jr's girlfriend, and Poppy's best friend
  - Harper, a Troll who loves to paint
- Matt Lowe as Creek, a Troll with zen-like wisdom
- Gary Cole as Sky Toronto, the boss and owner of Sky Toronto's Party Shop
- Abby Ryder Fortson as Priscilla, a young Troll
- Walt Dohrn as:
  - Cloud Guy, an anthropomorphic cloud
- Sainty Nelsen as Nova Swift, a trendsetter and fashionista Troll
- Jonah Platt as Milton Moss, a veterinarian Troll
- Utkarsh Ambudkar as Master Controll, a rapper
- Fryda Wolff as:
  - Dr. Moonbloom, a medical Troll
  - Gia Grooves, a Troll who run the daycare center
- Alexa Kahn as Tug Duluth, a tour guide Troll
- Kevin Michael Richardson as:
  - Klaus Von Frousting, a Troll who applies frosting
  - Groth, an upper class Bergen
  - Chad and Todd, the guards of the Royal Bergen family
- Pat Pinney as Nangus, a Bergen who is in charge of the dungeon
- Arnie Pantoja as Archer Pastry, a creature who was once part of a group called "The Party Crashers"
- Rachel Bloom as Cybil, a fortune teller Troll

== Episodes ==
Season	Segments	Episodes	Originally released
1	12	6	January 19, 2018
2	14	7	March 9, 2018
3	12	6	August 24, 2018
4	13	7	November 2, 2018
5	12	6	January 18, 2019
6	12	6	April 9, 2019
7	14	7	August 27, 2019
8	14	7	November 22, 2019

== Soundtrack ==
DreamWorks Trolls - The Beat Goes On! (Music From the TV Series)

Soundtrack album by Cast of Trolls: The Beat Goes On!
- Released: March 16, 2018
- Genre: Pop
- Length: 34:00
- Label: RCA Records

=== Songs ===
All tracks are written by Alana Da Fonseca and Jordan Yaeger, except where noted.

No.	Title	Writer(s)	Performer(s)	Length
1.	"Hair In The Air"	Jeannie Lurie; Mia Minichiello; Matias Mora	Kenz Hall; Skylar Astin; Ensemble	2:16
2.	"Happily Ever After"		Aleque Reid; Astin; Ensemble	2:34
3.	"One and Only Love"		Kari Wahlgren; Sam Lerner	2:22
4.	"Sunshine All the Time"		Fryda Wolff	2:35
5.	"Best Day Ever"		Reid	2:32
6.	"Party On"		Kevin Michael Richardson	2:20
7.	"Forgive Me (Show Version)"		Astin	2:24
8.	"Move Ya Body"		Walt Dohrn	2:42
9.	"The Other Side of the Storm"		Reid; Astin	2:58
10.	"Happy Prank Day"		Reid; Ensemble	2:18
11.	"Rap Battle Suite"		Reid; Richardson; Utkarsh Ambudkar; David Fynn	2:15
12.	"Dance It Out"		Reid	2:49
13.	"The Winners"		Reid	2:22
14.	"Forgive Me (Remix)"		Astin	2:22

== Broadcast ==
The series was released internationally on Netflix. It was also aired on linear television in the United States on Universal Kids, in the United Kingdom on Pop, Tiny Pop and Pop Max, in Australia on ABC Me, in Canada on Family, in South Africa on e.tv, in Southeast Asia on DreamWorks Channel Asia, in the Philippines on TV5 (dubbed in Filipino) and in Pakistan on Pop.

The series was also released for broadcast in South Korea on Tooniverse. The main theme of the program, "Hair in the Air", is sung in its Korean version featuring vocals from Red Velvet's Yeri and NCT's Jeno, Jaemin, and Renjun.

== Home media ==
Trolls: The Beat Goes On! - Seasons 1 - 4, containing all of the episodes from seasons 1–4, was released on DVD on May 7, 2019, by Universal Pictures Home Entertainment.
