= Level-coil =

Party game

Level-coil or pitch-buttock is an old party game played at Christmas in which players have to forfeit their seat to another, often in a boisterous manner. The name is a corruption of its French name lève-cul, meaning to lift the buttocks.

== See also ==
- Musical chairs
- Buggins' turn
