= Lockstep compensation =

System of employee remuneration

Lockstep compensation or seniority-based compensation is a system of remuneration in which employees' salaries are based purely on their seniority within the organization. For example, in the legal profession, where this system is most commonly found, all law school graduates hired by a law firm who graduated in the same year receive the same base pay regardless of background, experience, or ability. These associates will also receive automatic annual pay raises, bonuses, and promotions. Alternatively, some law firms implement a lockstep compensation system starting with partners or partner-track associates. During the Great Recession, some law firms began replacing the lockstep system with "merit-based" systems.

Proponents of the system have argued that lockstep compensation promotes loyalty, discourages intra-office competition, reduces the need for perpetual performance assessment, and provides for more flexible work structures. These benefits, however, are limited to situations where a business can predict with some certainty the future productivity of an employee. At the same time, however, the system has been criticized for being inefficient and reducing incentives for employees to improve performance. Because a lockstep system provides little to no accountability for employee productivity, there can be little assurance that employees will not take advantage by reducing their output or that extremely energetic employees will be under-compensated.

Some law firms have modified their lockstep system to allow for performance-based bonus structures. These bonuses can partially cure the incentive-based issues that stem from lockstep compensation. Other law firms have moved toward adopting a purely merit-based compensation system for associates. Purely merit-based models have been criticized as too volatile, with the prominent failed example of Dewey & LeBoeuf failing under a merit-based partnership system.

Seniority-based compensation has been described as discrimination based on seniority or ageism.

== See also ==
- Cravath System
- Meritocracy
- Nenko system
