= Seniority =

Status of being older or of a higher status/position in an organization than someone else

Seniority is the state of being older or placed in a higher position of status relative to another individual, group, or organization. For example, one employee may be senior to another either by role or rank (such as a CEO vice a manager), or by having more years served within the organization (such as one peer being accorded greater status over another due to amount of time in). The term "seniority" can apply to either concept or both concurrently.

== In armed forces ==
In some military command structures, the length of time someone has held a particular rank is called "seniority in grade" and determines whether that person is senior to another person of the same rank. For instance, a captain who was promoted five years ago can give orders to a captain who was promoted three years ago.

== In politics ==
Seniority in United States politics, when used out of context, is informally defined as the number of years one member of a group has been part of the group.

As of March 2022, Hal Rogers is Dean of the United States House of Representatives, the most senior member of the House of Representatives, having represented Kentucky since 1981 (21 terms). However, "seniority" can also refer to political power attained by position within the United States Government.

- United States Order of Precedence
- United States presidential line of succession
- Seniority in the United States Senate

Seniority is viewed sometimes both positively and negatively. Many elected officials are viewed as retaining their position only because they have been there for many years, which can reflect voter stagnancy and the benefits of incumbency. On the other hand, long years of incumbency can also be seen as a sign of the person's ability to continue pleasing voters or the use of seniority to deliver benefits to constituents.

In some countries the Dean of the Diplomatic Corps receives special treatment.

== In employment ==
In unionised companies, employees with more seniority may enjoy more work privileges. Here are examples:

- Shift work at more favourable times
- Work that is deemed easier or more pleasurable
- Working hours at a more convenient time (convenience being relative to the employee)
- Assignment to work, when a work reduction, or a reduction in available work hours results in layoffs

Seniority also has an influence over bumping rights, which is a reassignment of jobs, possibly for many people at a time.

Some traditionalist employers, common in smaller, single-operated business, take a "last in, first out" (LIFO) - notably in the education sector - perspective, meaning those who have been there longest or who have tenure have the right to stay, whereas other employers take a "first in, first out" (FIFO) or "inverse seniority" viewpoint, which tends to emphasize a new or "fresh start" for the company.

Seniority does have several positive factors to its name. Individuals may be drawn toward a specific field or occupation with the knowledge that seniority is obtainable. If seniority were to be banished as a whole, many higher paid employees would be fired first just because they make more money than their peers. Seniority does an effective job in helping people, interested in staying at one organization, in working towards having a "marathon" career. One of the goals of a seniority system is employee retention, which ensures an organization is retaining institutional knowledge, erudite employees, and an opportunity for mentorship of new hires. It is important to make sure employees are here to stay.

Though the principle of seniority does an effective job of protecting long-term employees, in some scenarios, it can fail to address several critical factors. Firstly, spots secured by seniority casts aside some of the most appealing perspectives. Individuals will become less driven to enter a field that does not reinforce their efforts with employment. Secondly, the security of tenure often encourages mediocrity. Employees with the knowledge that their spot in the workplace is secured will naturally become less likely to improve their working ethics as they may no longer view improvement as a necessity. Lastly, a system rewarding individuals for their hiring date does not encourage professional growth. If individuals are aware they only have to reach a certain time-span of employment to have a guaranteed position in a company, they will not grow professionally once they have reached their mark.

During the late 20th century in the United States, the federal government stopped emphasizing seniority as the primary basis for pay raises for its workforce. The Reagan administration replaced a seniority-based system for pay increases for its white collar government workers. The new system included performance appraisal.

In personnel economics, some researchers take the view that seniority pay is employed by firms as a solution to the problem of shirking. Since firms cannot always monitor the effort of their employees, they need to introduce an incentive for their employees to keep up the work. One way firms can accomplish this is through delayed compensation, in which employees are paid below the value of what they are producing in the first years at a firm, and paid above the value of their production in later years. The continuous rising of the wage based on seniority at the firm ensures that shirking, which can lead to dismissal, becomes much more costly for employees due to the loss of the high wages they can expect when staying at a firm for a long time.

=== Bumping rights ===
Some collective agreements include so called bumping provision (also known as bumping rights). The bumping involves a senior employee whose job position is being eliminated to displace a junior worker from their job. The junior employee thus losing the job might then "bump" another, even more junior, person. Bumping rights usually come with restrictions, like requirement of a minimum period of employment before bumping is possible, allowing only moves to positions previously held, or limiting the departments or jobs where the bumping can occur.

=== In transport ===
Commercial aviation pilots working for a carrier have their privileges determined by their seniority or generally known as the "pilot seniority list." These privileges can be income level, routes flown, types of aircraft, work schedules and positions. Seniority is most important when deciding which pilots to upgrade to a larger, more complex aircraft type; or for upgrading a First Officer to the rank of a Captain.

Engine drivers with many railways also have a seniority list, but it is focused on work scheduling. Younger engine drivers often serve as back-up personnel and must help out on a very short notice – for example when a colleague calls in sick or has a delay.

== See also ==
- Auncienty
- Buggins' turn
- Gerontocracy
- Gerousia, in ancient Sparta
- Lockstep compensation
- Seniority in the United States House of Representatives
- Seniority in the United States Senate
- Superior (hierarchy)
- Tenure

== Sources ==
- Joachim, Kaye M. (Fall 1998). "Seniority Rights and the Duty to Accommodate". Queen's Law Journal. 24 (1): 131–188.
