= Buggins' turn =

Disparaging term for undue promotions

Buggins' turn or Buggins's turn is a humorous, disparaging British term for appointment to a position by rotation or seniority rather than by merit.

This practice in the British Royal Navy was a concern of the reforming Admiral Fisher (1841 –1920) who wrote, "Going by seniority saves so much trouble. 'Buggins's turn' has been our ruin and will be disastrous hereafter!"

Buggins previously appeared in an epigram of Robert Herrick.

Upon Buggins
Buggins is Drunke all night, all day he sleepes;
This is the Levell-coyle that Buggins keeps.

Level-coil was an old party game in which the players changed seats.
