= Bump (union) =

A bump is a reassignment of jobs on the basis of seniority in unionised organisations in the private or public sector typically outlined in the conditions of employment contracts or collective bargaining agreements. This may include employees with greater seniority displacing employees with less seniority during layoffs, or more routine procedures of how work shifts and vacation dates are allocated.

The exact terms are subject to negotiation and may vary across collective bargaining agreements and employment agreements. In one example, if a job becomes vacant, more than one person may be reassigned to different tasks or ranks on the basis of who has worked for the organisation longer. As the next person assumes the duties of the person who has vacated, now the job of the replacement person likewise becomes vacant and must thus be filled by the next person with the appropriate seniority level. An exception to this may be unionised organisations that occasionally employ summer students, whereby the students do not officially accumulate any seniority and cannot thus "bump" another person.

== See also ==
- Closed shop
