= Chinese fire drill =

Slang term

"Chinese fire drill" is a predominantly American slang term for a situation that is chaotic or confusing, possibly due to poor or misunderstood instructions. It may also be known as a Polish fire drill or, increasingly, simply as a fire drill.

The phrase has been criticised owing to its associating "Chinese" as a descriptor with incompetence, chaos or otherwise poor quality.

In English speaking nations, 'Chinese fire drill' is also the name of a prank (example) where the passengers of a stopped car must exit their seats and run around the car, until they end up in a new seat of the car while the vehicle is stopped, typically at a stop light. Sometimes the prank becomes a game, where the passengers must complete the swap in the shortest time, or count how many stop lights they can perform the prank at. This prank is usually done by teenagers and young adults.

== Origins ==
The term is generally regarded as having originated with British troops either during or prior to WWI, with the phrase then spreading to their American counterparts due to their mixing throughout the war. The phrase then remained popular in American English while eventually falling out of use elsewhere.

One specific tale of the phrase's origin is alleged to have occurred in the 1900s when a ship run by British officers and a Chinese crew practiced a fire drill for a fire in the engine room. The bucket brigade were to draw water from the starboard side, pass it to the engine room, and pour it onto the simulated "fire". To prevent flooding, a separate crew was ordered to ferry the accumulated water from the engine room up to the main deck, and to heave the water over the port side. The drill had previously gone according to plan, until the orders were confused in interpretation. The bucket brigade began to draw the water from the starboard side, run directly over to the port side and then throw the water overboard, bypassing the engine room completely.

Alternatively, the phrase's origin may lie in the historical Western use of the word Chinese to denote "confusion" and "incomprehensibility", which historians trace to the earliest contacts between Europeans and Chinese people in the 1600s, attributing it to Europeans' inability to understand China's radically different culture and world view. In his 1989 Dictionary of Invective, British editor Hugh Rawson lists 16 phrases that use the word "Chinese" to denote "incompetence, fraud and disorganization".

Other examples of such use include:

- "Chinese puzzle", a puzzle with a nonexistent or a hard-to-fathom solution.
- "Chinese whispers", a children's game in which a straightforward statement is shared through a sequence of players, one player at a time, until it reaches the end, often getting comically transformed along the way into a completely different statement. This game is also known as "broken telephone" in North America and "wire-less telephone" in Brazil.
- "Chinese ace", an inept pilot, derived from the term "one wing low" (which supposedly sounds like a Chinese name), an aeronautical maneuver.

== Other uses ==
=== Prank ===
Teenagers riding in a car, 1955.

'Chinese Fire Drill' has been the name of numerous different pranks and games throughout the 19th and 20th centuries, but the most famous example and the usage surviving today is the prank involving passengers of a car swapping seats when the car is stopped. The origin of the usage of the term 'Chinese Fire Drill' is unclear, but speculated to have originated in the United States in either the 1950s, or 1960s and rise in popularity through the 1970s. The rise of car culture and a culture of teenage rebellion in the America at the time is credited for the invention and popularity of the prank.

Typically, the occupants of an automobile jump out, run around the vehicle, and jump back in at a different door, usually at a red light or other form of traffic stoppage, however, there are multiple varieties of the prank. Some versions involve re-entering the same seat exited from, jumping over the car, a single person doing it, two vehicles swapping people, and sometimes extra challenges such as shouting something or patting out the "flames" on top of one's head.

The name of the prank is derived from the original slang of Chinese Fire Drill, because of the chaotic nature of the prank. A common myth and folk-etymology of the prank falsely suggests that in China drivers must practice the Chinese Fire Drill as an actual fire drill, in the case their vehicle catches fire. The prank has also gained other names such as 'Red Light Scramble' or 'Stoplight Switcheroo' to avoid the racial connotations of the name. In other nations, the prank takes on a different name, being 'le jeu du feu rouge' in French and 'Carrera loca en rojo' in Spanish.

The prank has come under scrutiny due to the danger of a person being struck, losing control of the vehicle, distracting other drivers, disrupting the flow of traffic, discouraging the use of seatbelts, and its overall association with unruly teenagers. Legally, the prank is commonly classified as Disorderly Conduct, Reckless Driving, Trespassing, Public Nuisance, and Child Endangerment, depending on the situation. The prank can lead to fines, arrests, license revocation, and other consequences that often increase the excitement and "dare" of the prank.

Sometimes this also refers to a driver stopping in the middle of the road and swapping places with a passenger in an emergency, because the driver is having trouble with road conditions or otherwise cannot continue driving.

=== Military Slang ===
Additionally, the term is documented to have been used in the US Marine Corps during World War II, where it was often expressed in the phrase "as screwed up as a Chinese fire drill". It was also commonly used by Americans during the Korean War and the Vietnam War.

== Offensiveness ==
Public use of the phrase has been considered to be offensive and racist. In 2017, a candidate for office in Nova Scotia, Matt Whitman, apologized for using the term in a video and subsequently removed the video. In 2020, Washington state Senator Patty Kuderer made an apology for using the term in a hearing; Linda Yang of Washington Asians for Equality stated that the term was racist and filed a complaint with the state. Kuderer apologized before any formal complaint was filed.

== In popular culture ==
A Chinese Firedrill is the name of a music project by Armored Saint and Fates Warning bassist Joey Vera. It released an album, Circles, in 2007. The album uses different musical foundations in each song, such that it is "chaotic or confusing", like a Chinese fire drill.

In "The City of New York vs. Homer Simpson", the first episode of The Simpsons season 9, a retailer in Manhattan's Chinatown shouts out "Chinese fire drill!" as Bart Simpson sets a firework at his shop.

== See also ==
- List of practical joke topics
- Stereotypes of East Asians in the United States
- Video showing the steps to perform the Chinese Fire Drill prank
