= Fire drill =

Method of practicing orderly evacuation in case of a fire

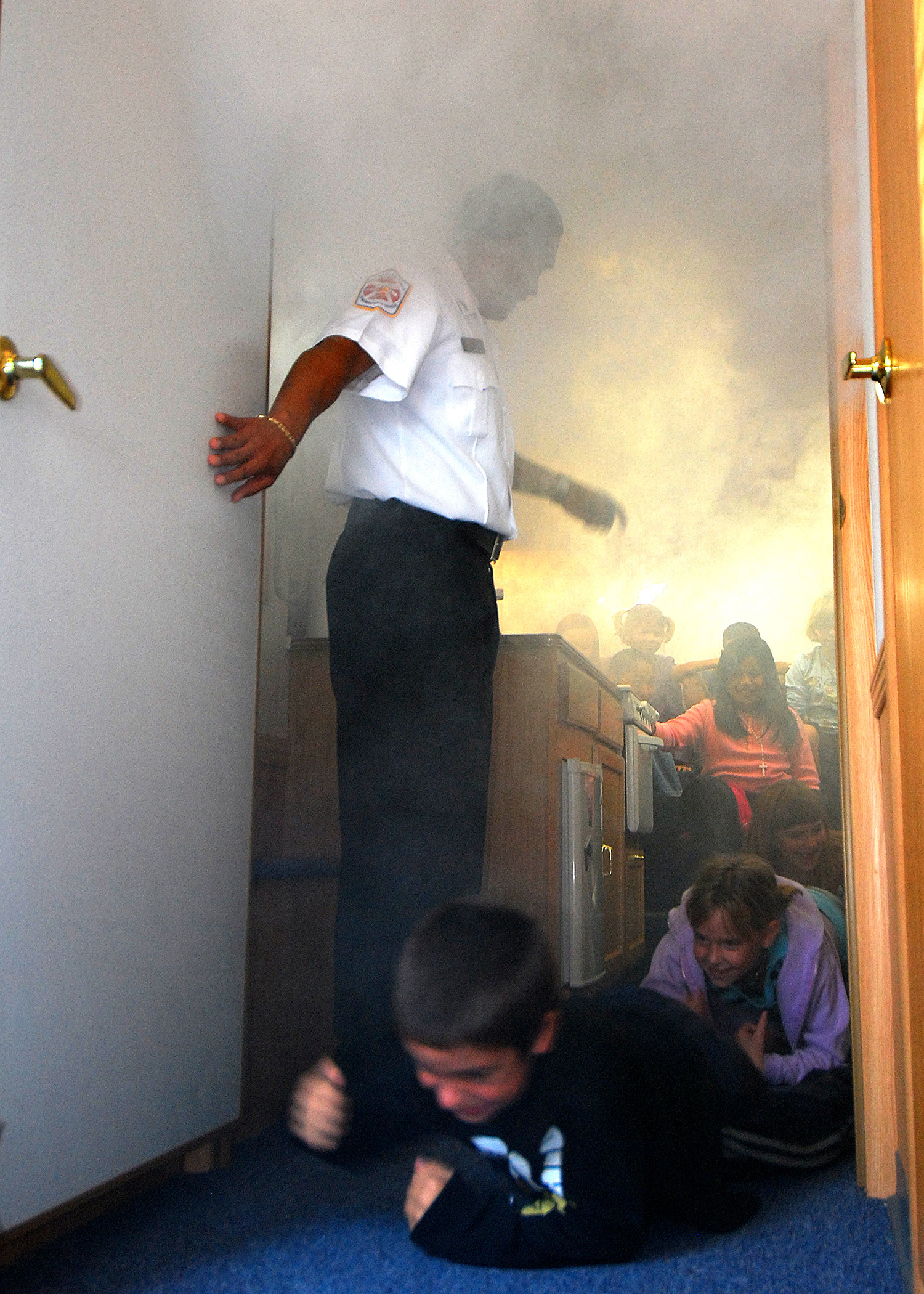
Students practicing a fire drill in a smoke trailer with a firefighter assisting them

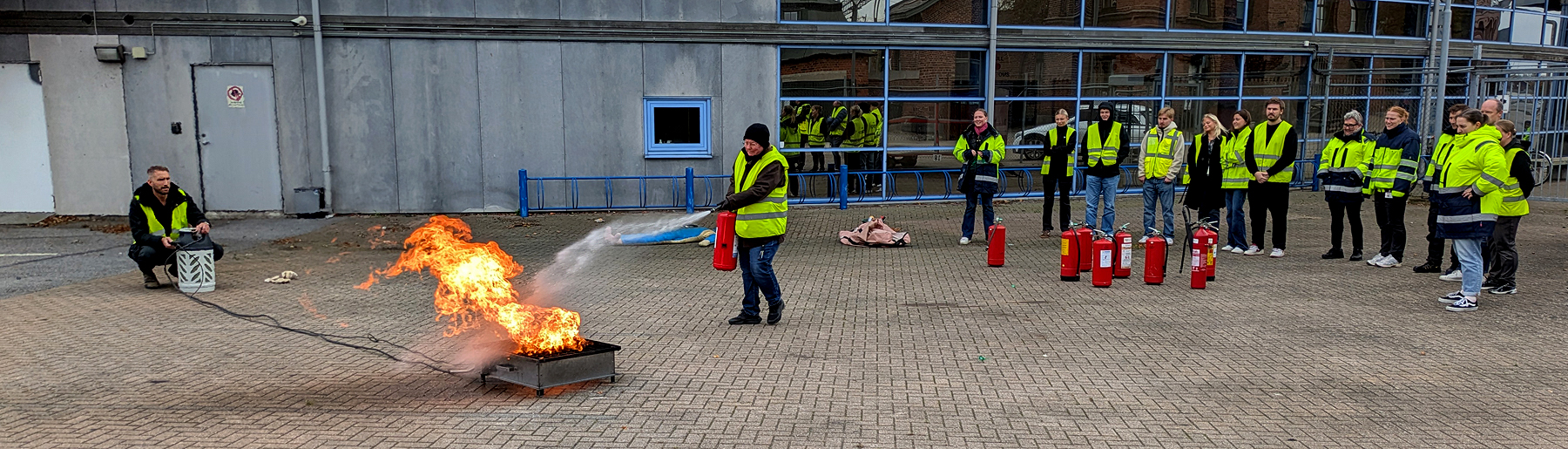
Fire drill with fire extinguishers for personnel at Ystad Port 2025.

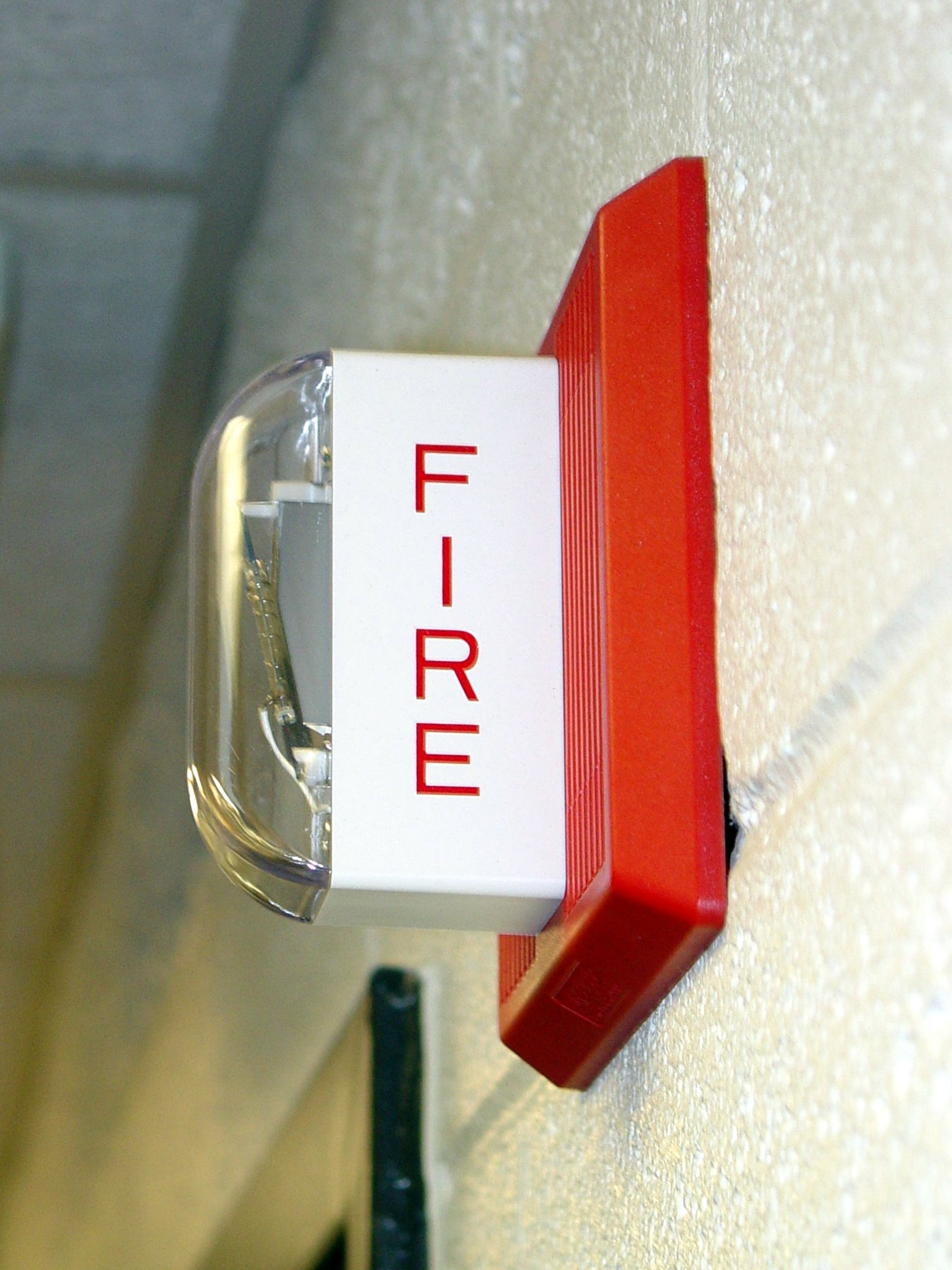
A fire alarm notification appliance widely used in North America

A fire drill is a method of practicing how a building should evacuate in the event of a fire or other emergencies. In most cases, the building's existing fire alarm system is activated and the building is evacuated by means of the nearest available exits, as if an emergency had actually occurred. Fire drill procedures may vary depending on the building type, such as hospitals or high rise buildings, where occupants may be relocated within the building as opposed to evacuating the building. Generally, the evacuation interval is measured to ensure that it is fast enough, and problems with the emergency system or evacuation procedures are identified so that they may be remedied.

In addition to fire drills, most buildings have their fire alarm systems checked on a regular basis to ensure that the system is working. Fire alarm tests are often done outside normal business hours so as to minimize disruption of building functions; in schools, they are often done when students and staff are not around or during the holidays where specialist fire alarm engineers test alarms in the building for repair if needed.

== History of fire drills ==
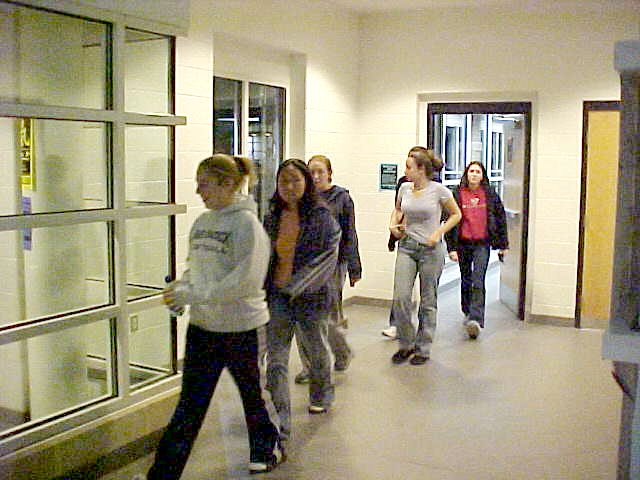
A group of students at James Madison University evacuate their dorm rooms in response to a fire drill

The purpose of fire drills in buildings is to ensure that everyone knows how to exit safely as quickly as possible if a fire, smoke, carbon monoxide, or other emergency occurs, and to familiarize building occupants with the sound of the fire alarm.

Before regular fire drills were instituted, an infamous fire broke out at the private Catholic school Our Lady of the Angels in 1958, in Chicago. Children on the second floor were trapped there, with neither teachers nor pupils knowing how to get out of the building safely. Many children jumped out of windows, and many were killed as they could not make their way to an exit. Although the school had passed a fire inspection only two months before, and had the number of fire exits and fire extinguishers required at the time, it lacked smoke detectors or adequate fire alarms, and was overcrowded.

The need for fire drills was recognized; monthly fire drills were implemented after the Our Lady of the Angels fire. It was found in a later study that education on fire also helped to prevent it: people started to learn more about what started fires, and what to do in the case of one starting. They were also aware of the hazards that allow a fire to start and grow. Within a year of the fire, many of the hazardous conditions such as found in Our Lady of the Angels had been eliminated in thousands of schools around the United States.

== Other improvements in fire safety ==
After the fire at Our Lady of the Angels, state regulations required that there had to be fire alarm street boxes no more than 100 feet (30 m) from the front of the building. The General Assembly of Illinois also passed life safety codes in response to the fire at Our Lady of the Angels. Things such as more control over waste disposal, proper storage of combustible supplies, more frequent fire drills, and inspections were put in place. Other reforms triggered by the fire include the city of Chicago modifying the Municipal Building Code of Chicago, affecting fire safety of schools as well as other buildings with two or more stories.

To prevent fires and deaths caused by fires, schools must have an evacuation plan in place, and make sure that all the proper fire alarms and warnings work. Teachers must take charge of the situation and act as leaders. Teachers should also consider the number of students that they have, and the need for enough space and time to get all of the students out quickly and safely. Teachers should also be alert to the causes of fires, in order to try and stop them from happening.

== Fire drill regulations ==
Many jurisdictions require that fire drills be conducted at certain intervals. This is the case in educational institutions, and also other workplaces and buildings. The frequency of such drills and what must be done during them may be laid down in statutes.

=== United States ===
In the United States, school fire drill regulations are set by individual states. While all mandate fire drills during the course of a school year, the frequency and number vary from state to state.

The following states require that schools conduct a fire drill once per month:

- Alabama
- Alaska
- Arkansas
- California (elementary schools)
- Colorado
- Connecticut
- Delaware
- District of Columbia
- Florida
- Georgia
- Indiana
- Kentucky
- Missouri
- Nebraska
- Nevada
- New Hampshire
- New Jersey
- North Carolina
- Ohio
- Oregon
- Pennsylvania
- Rhode Island
- South Carolina
- Tennessee
- Texas
- Utah (elementary schools)
- West Virginia
- Wisconsin

The following states require that schools conduct a specific number of drills over the course of the entire school year, or that a certain number of drills must be conducted within a certain period of time:

- Alaska
- Arizona
- California (middle and high schools)
- Florida
- Hawaii
- Illinois
- Iowa
- Kansas
- Louisiana
- Maine
- Maryland
- Massachusetts
- Michigan
- Minnesota
- Montana
- New Mexico
- New York
- Oklahoma
- South Dakota
- Utah (middle and high schools)
- Vermont
- Virginia

The following states specify a greater frequency of fire drills at the beginning of the school year:

- District of Columbia
- Georgia
- Louisiana
- Maine
- New York
- Ohio
- Rhode Island
- Tennessee
- Utah
- Virginia
- Washington
- West Virginia

Until regulations changed on November 1, 2010, New Jersey was unique in its requirement that schools conduct 2 fire drills per month. Under later requirements, one of the 2 fire drills was replaced by a monthly security drill.

=== United Kingdom ===
The National Union of Teachers requires that all schools, colleges and universities and any other education establishment perform a fire evacuation drill every term. It is required that most schools perform a fire drill at the start of the academic year. According to UK fire regulations, any new buildings that were built after the fire safety regulations changed in 2005, every room should have at least one fire alarm device such as a bell, a sounder (siren) or smoke/heat alarm installed. Regular safety checks such as testing fire alarms or smoke alarms and fire extinguishers should be performed weekly and does not require building evacuation. According to the Regulatory Reform (Fire Safety) Order 2005, all workplaces must have an emergency plan specifying staff actions, evacuation plans and arrangements for contacting the fire brigade.

=== New Zealand ===
The New Zealand Fire Service requires all schools and educational facilities to carry out a fire drill (termed a trial evacuation) at least once every six months, unless a shorter period is specified in the school's approved evacuation scheme. Schools need to give the Fire Service 7–10 working days' notice before a fire drill is planned, and must submit a report to the Fire Service within 7–10 working days of the drill; an unplanned alarm activation does not count as a fire drill.

== See also ==
- Active shooter training
- Chinese fire drill, a slang term for a chaotic situation
- False alarm
- Fire alarm
- Firefighter
- Tornado drill
- Muster drill
- Earthquake drill
- Exit sign
