= Nenko system =

Japanese promotion system

Male Salary Curve by Age in Japan (by large, medium, and small companies; the salary index for the 20-24 age bracket is 100)

The seniority-wage system (年功序列, Nenkō joretsu) is the Japanese system of promoting an employee in order of their proximity to retirement. The advantage of the system is that it allows older employees to achieve a higher salary level before retirement and that it usually concentrates those with more experience in the executive ranks. The disadvantage of the system is that it does not allow the experience to spread to new talent, and those with specialized skills cannot be promoted to the already crowded executive ranks. It also does not guarantee assigning the "right person for the job" or even attempt to utilise talent. The labor turnover rate in Japan is less than half the United States level. The seniority-wage system can also be seen in Japanese government. Japanese parliament seats are usually filled with the older members from each party.

After the economic bubble burst in Japan in the late 1980s and the venture capital (dot-com) shock of the 1990s, the seniority-wage system has become less popular amongst business, as they could not afford to keep older employees with high salaries on the payroll. Many mid-level executives that climbed the corporate ladder with the Nenko system fell victim to corporate restructuring.

== See also ==
- Seniority
- Simultaneous Recruiting of New Graduates
