= 14th Hollywood Music in Media Awards =

2023 Awards Ceremony

- Date: November 15, 2023
- Location: The Avalon, Hollywood
- Most wins: Trolls Band Together (3)
- Most nominations: Barbie (5)
- Website: www.hmmawards.com

The 14th Hollywood Music in Media Awards recognized the best in music in film, TV, video games, commercials, and trailers of 2023. The ceremony was held on November 15, 2023, at The Avalon in Hollywood.

The nominations were announced on November 2, 2023. Greta Gerwig's fantasy comedy film Barbie led the nominations with five, followed by Disney's live-action adaptation remake of The Little Mermaid and musical fantasy film Wonka with four each. American composer and lyricist Marc Shaiman was honored with the Career Achievement Award.

The category "Original Song – Sci-Fi/Fantasy Film" was revived after being discontinued in 2019, while the categories "Music Design – Trailer" and "Song – Onscreen Performance (TV Show/Limited Series)" were introduced.

== Winners and nominees ==
=== Career Achievement Award ===
- Marc Shaiman

=== Score ===
Original Score – Feature Film	Original Score – Independent Film
Killers of the Flower Moon – Robbie Robertson (posthumous); American Fiction – Laura Karpman; Chevalier – Kris Bowers; Nyad – Alexandre Desplat; Oppenheimer – Ludwig Göransson; Rustin – Branford Marsalis; Saltburn – Anthony Willis; The Killer – Trent Reznor and Atticus Ross	The Zone of Interest – Mica Levi; Dalíland – Edmund Butt; Dream Scenario – Owen Pallett; Jules – Volker Bertelmann; Miranda's Victim – Holly Amber Church; She Came to Me – Bryce Dessner
Original Score – Animated Film	Original Score – Sci-Fi/Fantasy Film
Spider-Man: Across the Spider-Verse – Daniel Pemberton; Chicken Run: Dawn of the Nugget – Harry Gregson-Williams; Elemental – Thomas Newman; Migration – John Powell; Ruby Gillman, Teenage Kraken – Stephanie Economou; The Super Mario Bros. Movie – Brian Tyler	The Marvels – Laura Karpman; Asteroid City – Alexandre Desplat; Barbie – Mark Ronson and Andrew Wyatt; The Creator – Hans Zimmer; The Hunger Games: The Ballad of Songbirds & Snakes – James Newton Howard; Transformers: Rise of the Beasts – Jongnic Bontemps
Original Score – Horror/Thriller Film	Original Score – Documentary
A Haunting in Venice – Hildur Guðnadóttir; Deliver Us – Tóti Guðnason; Knock at the Cabin – Herdís Stefánsdóttir; M3GAN – Anthony Willis; The Boogeyman – Patrick Jonsson; The Exorcist: Believer – David Wingo and Amman Abbasi	Still: A Michael J. Fox Movie – John Powell; Kangaroo Valley – H. Scott Salinas and Logan Stahley; Split at the Root – Lili Haydn; The Deepest Breath – Nainita Desai; The Pigeon Tunnel – Philip Glass and Paul Leonard-Morgan
Original Score – Independent Film (Foreign Language)	Original Score – TV/Streamed Movie
Society of the Snow – Michael Giacchino; Control – Taisuke Kimura; Last Wishes – Carla F. Benedicto; Los Reyes Magos: La Verdad – Arturo Cardelús; Paradice – Sandrine Rudaz; The Promised Land – Dan Romer	Shooting Stars – Mark Isham; A Biltmore Christmas – Tommy Fields; A Tourist's Guide to Love – Jina Hyojin An and Shirley Song; Please Don't Destroy: The Treasure of Foggy Mountain – Amie Doherty; River Wild – Tristan Clopet
Original Score – TV Show/Limited Series	Original Score – TV Show/Limited Series (Foreign Language)
Succession – Nicholas Britell; American Horror Stories: "Tapeworm" – Mac Quayle; Beef – Bobby Krlic; Godfather of Harlem – Mark Isham; Loki – Natalie Holt; Silo – Atli Örvarsson; Swagger – Terence Blanchard; The Gilded Age – Harry Gregson-Williams and Rupert Gregson-Williams	Liaison (French) – Walter Mair; The Net: Prometheus (German) – Matthias Weber; Taj: Divided by Blood (Hindi) – Ian Arber
Original Score – Short Film (Live Action)	Original Score – Short Film (Animated)
Huracán Ramírez vs. La Piñata Enchilada – Juan Carlos Enriquez; Beyond the Sea – Romain Zante; Ivan – Fadi Khoury; Lo Que Siembras – David Heymann; Motherland – Oscar Pan	Overwatch 2 – Adam Burgess; Cosmo – Devesh Sodha; Kadunud sokid: The Mystery of Missing Socks – Rihards Zaļupe; Mooned – Orlando Pérez Rosso; Wing It! – Mariana Calegari; You Ming Zhi – Chad Cannon
Original Score – Short Film (Documentary)	Original Score – Documentary Series – TV/Digital
Bubjan – Katy Jarzebowski; Jack and Sam – David Majzlin; Kalu: Growing Up Wild – Jack McKenzie; The Last Repair Shop – Katya Richardson and Kris Bowers; The Shark with a Thousand Names – Sascha Blank	Ed Sheeran: The Sum of It All – Ian Arber; Beckham – Anze Rozman, Camilo Forero, and Chris Brocato; Life on Our Planet – Lorne Balfe; Our Planet – Jasha Klebe and Thomas Farnon; The Reluctant Traveler with Eugene Levy – David Schweitzer
Original Score – Video Game	Original Song/Score – Mobile Video Game
New World: Rise of the Angry Earth – Edouard Brenneisen; Assassin's Creed Mirage – Brendan Angelides; Atomic Heart – Andrey Boogrov, Geoffrey Day, and various artists; Baldur's Gate 3 – Borislav Slavov; Diablo IV – Ted Reedy, Leo Kaliski, and Derek Duke; Final Fantasy XVI – Masayoshi Soken	Peacekeeper Elite (Game for Peace) – Written by Inon Zur, Jeff Broadbent, C.May Xiao, Kin Lee, MEMME, Alec Justice, Luki Knoebl, Qiu Liang, G.G.Music, YSY AUDIO, and LIGHTSPEED STUDIOS AUDIO; Arena Breakout – Music composed, conducted, and produced by Geng Li; Lyrics by Geng Li and Michael R. Rego; QQ Speed – Music by Nick Pyo, Kim Heeyoung; Lyrics written by FuKu/HeLi Song; Performed by Yunlong Zheng and Jialin Liao; Racing Master – Produced by Z1ON @CEM and 3A @2088; Music Designed by Jingru Gong @Netease Games; Teamfight Tactics: Runeterra Reforged – Composed by Bill Hemstapat and J.D. Spears

=== Song ===
Original Song – Feature Film	Original Song – Independent Film
"What Was I Made For?" from Barbie – Written by Billie Eilish O'Connell and Finneas O'Connell; Performed by Billie Eilish; "I'm Just Ken" from Barbie – Written by Mark Ronson and Andrew Wyatt; Performed by Ryan Gosling (featuring Slash and Wolfgang Van Halen); "The Fire Inside" from Flamin' Hot – Written by Diane Warren; Performed by Becky G; "High Life" from Flora and Son – Written by Gary Clark, John Carney, and Eve Hewson; Performed by Eve Hewson, Orén Kinlan, Jack Reynor, and Joseph Gordon-Levitt; "I Am" from Origin – Written by Stan Walker, Michael Fatkin, Vince Harder, and Te Kanapu Anasta; Performed by Stan Walker; "Road to Freedom" from Rustin – Written and performed by Lenny Kravitz; "This" from The Beanie Bubble – Written by Damian Kulash Jr. and Timothy Nordwind; Performed by OK Go; "Keep It Movin'" from The Color Purple – Written by Halle Bailey, Denisia Andrews, Brittany Coney, and Morten Ristorp; Performed by Halle Bailey and Phylicia Pearl Mpasi	"I Got You" from Holiday Twist – Written by Michael Jay and Alan Demoss; Performed by Jake Miller; "Stardust" from A Good Person – Written by Cary Brothers and Scott Effman; Performed by Cary Brothers; "Space and Time" from Master Gardener – Written by S.G. Goodman; Performed by Mereba; "Quiet Eyes" from Past Lives – Written by Sharon Van Etten and Zach Dawes; Performed by Sharon Van Etten; "El Saber" from Radical – Written and performed by Gaby Moreno; "Don't Forget Me When I'm Gone" from Sons 2 the Grave – Written by Sean Jones, Michael Shand, and Miku Graham; Performed by Sean Jones
Original Song – Animated Film	Original Song – Documentary
"Better Place" from Trolls Band Together – Written by Shellback, Justin Timberlake, and Amy Allen; Performed by NSYNC; "Steal the Show" from Elemental – Written by Ari Leff, Michael Matosic, and Thomas Newman; Performed by LAUV; "Down Like That" from PAW Patrol: The Mighty Movie – Written by Bryson Tiller, Chantry Johnson, Michelle Zarlenga, and Charlie Heath; Performed by Bryson Tiller; "Am I Dreaming" from Spider-Man: Across the Spider-Verse – Written by Mike Dean, Peter Lee Johnson, Rakim Mayers, Roisee, Landon Wayne, and Leland Wayne; Performed by A$AP Rocky, Metro Boomin, and Roisee; "Peaches" from The Super Mario Bros. Movie – Written by Jack Black, John Spiker, Eric Osmond, Michael Jelenic, and Aaron Horvath; Performed by Jack Black; "This Wish" from Wish – Written by Julia Michaels, Benjamin Rice, and JP Saxe; Performed by Ariana DeBose	"Todo Fue Por Amor" from With This Light – Written by Carla Morrison, Juan Alejandro Jimenez Perez, and Mario Demian Jimenez Perez; Performed by Carla Morrison; "Everything Is Gonna Be Alright" from Bobi Wine: The People's President – Written and performed by Bobi Wine; "Forty Foot Man" from Bobo & the Edge: A Sort of Homecoming with Dave Letterman – Written and performed by Bono and the Edge; "Speechless" from Louder Than Rock – Written by Israel Houghton and Adam Ranney; Performed by Caleb Quaye and Judith Hill; "Dream Your Little Dream" from The Jewel Thief – Written by Dan Braun and Josh Braun; Performed by The Braun Brothers
Original Song – Sci-Fi/Fantasy Film	Original Song – TV Show/Limited Series
"Can't Catch Me Now" from The Hunger Games: The Ballad of Songbirds & Snakes – Written by Dan Nigro and Olivia Rodrigo; Performed by Olivia Rodrigo; "A World of Your Own" from Wonka – Music Written by Neil Hannon; Lyrics by Neil Hannon, Simon Farnaby, and Paul King; Performed by Timothée Chalamet; "For the First Time" from The Little Mermaid – Music by Alan Menken; Lyrics by Lin-Manuel Miranda; Performed by Halle Bailey; "Wild Uncharted Waters" from The Little Mermaid – Music by Alan Menken; Lyrics by Lin-Manuel Miranda; Performed by Jonah Hauer-King; "You've Never Had Chocolate Like This" from Wonka – Written by Neil Hannon, Simon Farnaby, and Paul King; Performed by Timothée Chalamet and cast	"Fought & Lost" from Ted Lasso – Written by Jamie Hartman, Sam Ryder, and Tom Howe; Performed by Sam Ryder; "Look At Us Now (Honeycomb)" from Daisy Jones & the Six – Written by Blake Mills and Marcus Mumford; Performed by Riley Keough and Sam Claflin; "One Step Closer" from Jane – Written by Diane Warren; Performed by Leona Lewis; "Which of the Pickwick Triplets Did It?" from Only Murders in the Building – Written by Benj Pasek, Justin Paul, Marc Shaiman, and Scott Wittman; Performed by Steve Martin; "Your Personal Trash Man Can" from The Marvelous Mrs. Maisel – Written by Curtis Moore and Thomas Mizer; Performed by cast
Original Song – Video Game	Original Song – Short Film
"Swing" from Marvel's Spider-Man 2 – Written by Dernst "D'Mile" Emile II, Eian Parker, Ian Welch, and Olu Fann; Performed by Benji and EARTHGANG; "Blacktail" from Blacktail – Composed by Arkadiusz Reikowski. With performances by Robot Koch, Zazula Vocal Group, Bartosz Pałyga, and CZELUSC Collective; "After Party (Just Dance)" from Just Dance 2024 – Written by Clément Langlois-Légaré, Yannick Rastogi, Zacharie Morier-Gxoyiya, and Zacharie Raymond; Performed by Banx & Ranx and Zack Zoya; "Glow in the Dark" from Rocksmith+ – Written by Alna Hofmeyr, Maize Olinger, McKenzie Ellis, and Nick Sadler; Performed by MOTHICA; "Ballad of Dreams Past" from The World 3 – Written by Zhou Guoyi; Performed by Erjun June and Miao Gongjiang; "Coming Alive" from Tournament of Souls – Written by Brendon Williams, Corben Nikk Bowen, Emanuel Williams, Jason Walsh, and Konrad Abramowicz; Performed by League of Legends and Vo Williams	"Mushka's Lullaby" from Mushka – Written by Richard M. Sherman; Vocals by Holly Sedillos; Arranged and Produced by Fabrizio Mancinelli; "Behind the Sky" from Camp Courage – Written by Nathan Halpern; Performed by Emily Forsythe; "Christmas Is Nearly Here" from Mickey Saves Christmas – Written by Ben Zeadman and Laura Schein; Performed by Laura Schein; "Rhythm of My Heart" from Pacemaker – Written by Christopher Lennertz; Performed by Philip Lawrence and Alex Newell; "Take It" from The Bank Manager – Written by Jacquie Joy and Madeleine Chaplain; Vocals by Madeleine Chaplain; "The Routine" from The Routine – Written, produced, and performed by Alexandra Petkovski
Song – Onscreen Performance (Film)	Song – Onscreen Performance (TV Show/Limited Series)
"High Life" from Flora and Son – Eve Hewson, Joseph Gordon Levitt, Orén Kinlan, and Jack Reynor; "Better Place" from Trolls Band Together – NSYNC; "For the First Time" from The Little Mermaid – Halle Bailey; "I'm Just Ken" from Barbie – Ryan Gosling; "Keep It Movin'" from The Color Purple – Halle Bailey and Phylicia Pearl Mapsi; "Out Alpha the Alpha" from Dicks: The Musical – Megan Thee Stallion; "Praise Nationals Finale" from Praise This – Oil Factory (featuring Chlöe, Jekalyn Carr, and Loren Lott); "A World of Your Own" from Wonka – Timothée Chalamet	"Which of the Pickwick Triplets Did It?" from Only Murders in the Building – Written by Benj Pasek, Justin Paul, Marc Shaiman, and Scott Wittman; Performed by Steve Martin; "Love You Forever" from High School Musical: The Musical: The Series – Written by Matthew Tishler and Cozi Zuehlsdorff; Performed by Joshua Bassett and the cast; "Over and Done" from Schmigadoon! – Written by Cinco Paul; Performed by Ariana DeBose, Phoenix Best, Cassondra James Kellam, and Shayna Steele; "So Long, Farewell" from Ted Lasso – Written by Oscar Hammerstein; Performed by cast; "Your Personal Trash Man Can" from The Marvelous Mrs. Maisel – Written by Curtis Moore and Thomas Mizer; Performed by cast
Original Song/Score – Commercial Advertisement
Final Fantasy XVI – Masayoshi Soken; Arranged by Masayoshi Soken and Yoshitaka Suzuki; "Mirage" from Assassin's Creed Mirage – OneRepublic and Mishaal Tamer; "Monkey King Theme" from Fantasy Westward Journey – BaiXiao, Hannah Zhang, and Alex Williamson; Music Designer and Producer: Ronghui Zhu; Huracán Ramírez vs. La Piñata Enchilada – Juan Carlos Enriquez; Lovebrush Chronicles – Jason Huang

=== Main Title Theme ===
Main Title Theme – TV Show/Limited Series	Main Title Theme – TV Show (Foreign Language)
Shrinking – Benjamin Gibbard and Tom Howe; Dear Edward – Benj Pasek, Justin Paul, and Lizzy McAlpine; My Kind of Country – Zach Dawes and Reyna Roberts; Percy Jackson and the Olympians – Bear McCreary; Queen Charlotte: A Bridgerton Story – Kris Bowers; The Rising – Carly Paradis	London Class (Saudi Arabia) – Ashraf Elziftawi; Taj: Divided by Blood (India) – Ian Arber; The Con Prisoner (Kuwait) – Ibrahim Shamel; Under Guardianship (Egypt) – Layal Watfeh

=== Music Supervision ===
Music Supervision – Film	Music Supervision – Television
Trolls Band Together – Angela Leus; Air – Andrea Von Foerster; Fast X – Rachel Levy; Immediate Family – Mason Cooper; Love to Love You, Donna Summer – Tracy McKnight; Trap Jazz – Tamar Davis	The Last of Us (Season 1) – Ian Broucek; American Horror Stories: "Bestie" – Anna Romanoff and Amanda Krieg Thomas; Godfather of Harlem (Season 3) – Stephanie Diaz-Matos and Jordan Carroll; Swagger (Season 2) – Derryck "Big Tank" Thornton; The Afterparty (Season 2) – Kier Lehman; Yellowjackets (Season 2) – Nora Felder
Music Supervision – Video Game
Honor of Kings – Ramin Djawadi; Assassin's Creed Mirage – Simon Landry; Marvel's Spider-Man 2 – Alex Hackford, Scott Hanau, and Keith Leary; Star Wars Jedi: Survivor – Steve Schnur; The Sandbox (Season 4) – Benjamin Beladi

=== Other ===
Music Themed Film or Musical	Music Documentary – Special Program
Trolls Band Together – Produced by Gina Shay; Directed by Walt Dohrn and Tim Heitz; Carmen – Produced by Rosemary Blight, Dimitri Rassam, and Mimi Valdes; Directed by Benjamin Millepied; The Little Mermaid – Produced by John DeLuca, Rob Marshall, Lin-Manuel Miranda, and Marc Platt; Directed by Rob Marshall; Theater Camp – Produced by Erik Feig, Samie Kim Falvey, Julia Hammer, Ryan Heller, Maria Zuckerman, Jessica Elbaum, Will Ferrell, Noah Galvin, Molly Gordon, Nick Lieberman, and Ben Platt; Directed by Molly Gordon and Nick Lieberman; Wonka – Produced by Alexandra Derbyshire, David Heyman, and Luke Kelly; Directed by Paul King	Immediate Family – Directed by Denny Tedesco; Produced by Greg Richling, Jack Piatt, and Jonathan Sheldon; Dear Mama: "Panther Power" – Directed by Allen Hughes; Produced by Joshua Garcia, Loren Gomez, Quincy Jones III, and Stef Smith; Ladies First: A Story of Women in Hip-Hop – Directed by Hannah Beachler, Dream Hampton, Raeshem Nijhon: Produced by Shawna Carroll, Syreeta Gates, Cherice Hunt, Janice James, and Princess A. Hairston; Little Richard: I Am Everything – Directed by Lisa Cortés; Produced by Robert Friedman, Lisa Cortés, Liz Yale Marsh, and Caryn Capotosto; San Francisco Sounds: A Place in Time – Directed by Alison Ellwood and Anoosh Tertzakian; Produced by Michael Wright, Jill Burkhart, Mark Pinkus, Charlie Cohen, Tom Mackay, Richard Story, Jeff Jampol, Aly Parker, Darryl Frank, Justin Falvey, Stacey Offman, Richard Perello, Jeff Pollack, Frank Marshall, Alison Ellwood, Erin Edeiken, and Tess Ranahan; Wynonna Judd: Between Hell and Hallelujah – Directed By Patty Ivins Specht; Produced by Reese Witherspoon, Sara Rea, Wynonna Judd, Cactus Moser, Jason Owen, Bruce Gillmer, Margaret Comeaux, Leslie Fram, Patty Ivins Specht, and Cassie Lambert Scalettar
Soundtrack Album	Exhibitions, Theme Parks, Special Projects
Barbie the Album – Atlantic Records; Creed III – Dreamville and Interscope Records; Fast X – Artist Partner Group; Guardians of the Galaxy Vol. 3 – Hollywood Records; Spider-Man: Across the Spider-Verse – Boominati Worldwide and Republic Records; Trolls Band Together – RCA Records	SeaWorld Abu Dhabi: Antarctica – Justin Schornstein; Data Zone Interactive Music Activation (Deamforce 2023) – Emperia Sound and Music & George P. Johnson; Hidden Wonders – Chris Thomas; Los Angeles Children's Chorus ("One Wish") – Charles-Henri Avelange; Shine! Opening Night – Atti Pacsay
Music Video (Independent)	Live Concert for Visual Media
"Gunjale" – Music written and performed by Matt B (feat. Ugaboys): Video directed by Angela V. Benson; "Background" – Music written and performed by Presley Aronson; Video directed by Ron Truppa; "Brooklyn" – Music written and performed by Elizabeth P.W.; Produced by Teddy Tracker Entertainment; Featuring Fabrication and Animation by Riana Johnson; Editing and Animation by Bridget Johnson; "Circles in My Mind" – Written by Alexander James Rodriguez and Liz Rodriguez; Video produced and directed by Liz Rodriguez; "Close in the Distance" – Music written by Masayoshi Soken; Arranged by GUNN; Lyrics by Tom Mills; Performed by The Primals (feat. Jason Charles Miller); Directed by Takumi Moriya; "Gravity" – Written by Yelpy, TheRealJonSmith and Elyssa James; Performed by Yelpy with additional vocals by Allie McDonald; Actors Yelpy and Ieva Georges; Video directed by Jonathan Martin; "Romantic Homicide" – Music written and performed by d4vd; Song arranged by Boomerang Music; Video directed by Micah Chambers-Goldberg; "Won't Be Around" – Music written and Produced by Terry Blade, Bobby Cole, and Larry D. Robertson; Performed and Directed by Terry Blade	Arknights: Ambience Synesthesia 2023 Wanted – Composed by Sterling Maffe, Obadiah Brown-Beach, David Lin, Robert Wolf, Steven Grove, Erik Castro, Matthew Carl Earl, and others; Performed by various artists; Infinite Borders: The Celebration Concert – Composed by Jason Huang; Orchestrated by Jason Huang and Kah Yong Tan; Performed by Hong Kong Chinese Orchestra, Le Xu, and Cui Xuan Wang; Music Designed by Zi Chong He@NetEase Games; Supervised by Wei Nie@NetEase Games; Directed by Judy Wang, You Hui Lu; Produced and published by NetEase Games Audio Sonus_Lemon Team; Onmoyi Concert (New Year's Eve 2022) – Performed by TOMO. Onmyoji Mobile Game; Lyrics by Jiang Zijie Song, Fan YangJing; Produced by Chang Zion and AL Ho; Produced by McCoy Xu; The Genndy Tartakovsky Musical Experience (Adult Swim Festival: Comic Con 2023) – Composed and performed by Tyler Bates and Joanne Higginbottom; When the Stars Stop Shining Concert – Composed by Jesús Agomar; Performed by Orquesta Comunitaria de Gran Canaria
Music Design – Trailer
Star Wars Jedi: Survivor Trailer – Blake Robinson; Diablo IV Live Action Trailer – Music by Juan Carlos Enriquez; Trailer directed by Chloé Zhao; Marvel's Spider-Man 2 Trailer – Music by John Paesano; Trailer design by BLUR; The Callisto Protocol: The Final Transmission Trailer – Krafton North America; Music by Emperia Sound and Music; Written by Jeff Rona and Alec Justice; The Callisto Protocol: Tianzi 76 Trailer – Music by Jvlin/Guanglei and Zhang/Yibo Yuan; Lyrics by Kina/Guanglei and Zhang/op.Bei Hu; Executive produced by Hongjian, Zhong/Xiaoyue, and Liu/Doctor/Zi Hui

=== Special Recognition ===
Song – Documentary Series – TV Show/Limited Series	Song/Score – New Media
"Just a Closer Walk with Thee" from Algiers, America: The Relentless Pursuit – Written by Shvkiel and Chad Cannon (lyricist unknown / traditional); Performed by Shvkiel	The Walking Dead: Last Mile – Jeff Rona
