= List of awards and nominations received by Justin Timberlake =

Justin Timberlake awards and nominations
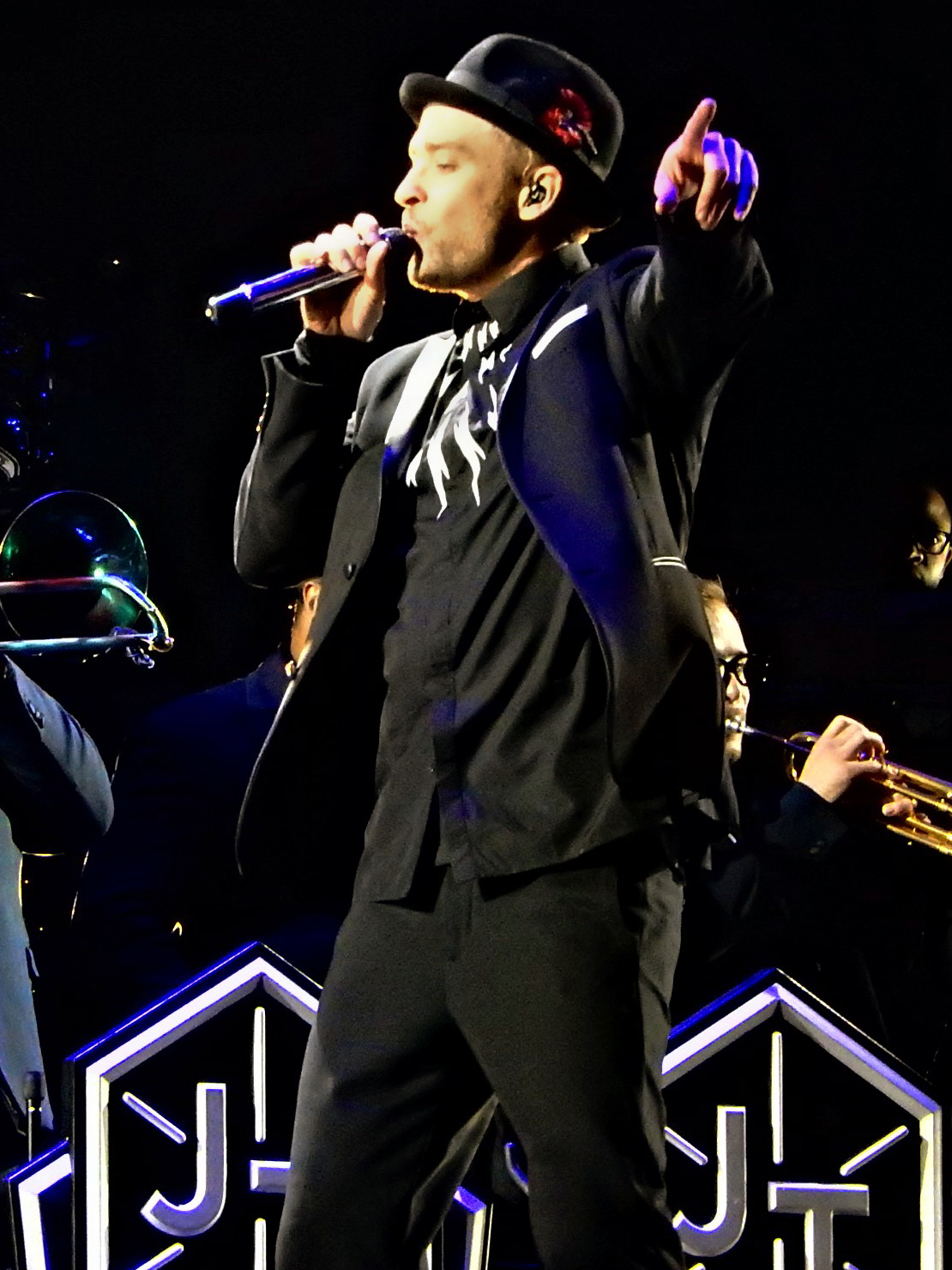
- Timberlake performing in 2014
Awards and nominations
Award	Wins	Nominations
Academy Award	0	1
American Music Awards	7	13
Billboard Music Awards	9	26
Brit Awards	3	6
CMT Music Awards	0	2
Critics' Choice Awards	0	3
Danish Music Awards	1	3
Emmy Awards	4	8
Fryderyk	0	2
Golden Globe Awards	0	2
Grammy Awards	10	40
iHeartRadio Music Awards	2	10
Hungarian Music Awards	0	2
Juno Awards	0	1
MTV Europe Music Awards	5	20
MTV Video Music Awards	11	26
NRJ Music Awards	3	7
People's Choice Awards	9	13
Rockbjörnen	1	1
Satellite Awards	0	1
Screen Actors Guild Awards	0	1
Silver Clef Awards	1	1
Teen Choice Awards	10	50
World Music Awards	3	11

Totals (Note: Certain award groups do not simply award one winner. They acknowledge several different recipients, have runners-up, and have third place. Since this is a specific recognition and is different from losing an award, runner-up mentions are considered wins in this award tally. For simplification and to avoid errors, each award in this list has been presumed to have had a prior nomination.)
- Wins: 176
- Nominations: 524 (Note: Awards in certain categories do not have prior nominations and only winners are announced by the jury. For simplification and to avoid errors, each award in this list has been presumed to have had a prior nomination.)

Justin Timberlake is an American singer-songwriter, actor, dancer, and record producer. He is the recipient of 10 Grammy Awards, 4 Emmy Awards, 7 American Music Awards, 3 Brit Awards, 9 Billboard Music Awards, 11 MTV Video Music Awards and 29 ASCAP Awards as well as nominations for an Academy Award, three Critics' Choice Movie Awards, two Golden Globe Award, and Screen Actors Guild Award.

Timberlake has won four Primetime Emmy Awards, twice for Outstanding Original Music and Lyrics and twice for Outstanding Guest Actor in a Comedy Series for Saturday Night Live. For his work on film he received nominations for the Academy Award for Best Original Song and Golden Globe Award for Best Original Song for his on the song "Can't Stop the Feeling!" from Trolls: Motion Picture Soundtrack (2016).

His debut solo album, Justified, generated the singles "Like I Love You", "Rock Your Body", "Señorita", and the Grammy Award for Best Male Pop Vocal Performance-winning song "Cry Me a River". Also nominated for Album of the Year, it took home the Grammy Award for Best Pop Vocal Album. Among other awards, it earned him American Music Awards for Favorite Pop/Rock Album, Brit Awards for International Album and International Male, MTV Europe Music Awards for Best Album and Best Male, and MTV Video Music Awards for Best Male Video and Best Pop Video–the latter two for "Cry Me a River." Timberlake's sophomore album FutureSex/LoveSounds garnered him seven Grammy nominations, including Album of the Year. Its singles "SexyBack" (in 2007) and "LoveStoned" (2008) both won Best Dance Recording, while "My Love" won Best Rap/Sung Collaboration. "What Goes Around... Comes Around" was nominated for Record of the Year and won Best Male Pop Vocal Performance. The album won the American Music Awards for Favorite Pop/Rock Album and Favorite Soul/R&B Album.

Timberlake received the Michael Jackson Video Vanguard Award and won Video of the Year for "Mirrors" at the 2013 MTV Video Music Awards. He attended the 2014 Billboard Music Awards taking home seven awards, including Top Artist and Top Billboard 200 Album for The 20/20 Experience. Timberlake earned seven Grammy nominations at the 2014 ceremony, winning Best Music Video for "Suit & Tie", Best R&B Song for "Pusher Love Girl", and Best Rap/Sung Collaboration for "Holy Grail". For his third and fourth studio album he also won three American Music Awards and three People's Choice Awards. He was presented with the Innovator Award at the 2015 iHeartRadio Music Awards. In October 2015, he was inducted into the Memphis Music Hall of Fame, becoming its youngest member. He received the inaugural Decade Award at the 2016 Teen Choice Awards. In 2019, he received the Contemporary Icon Award by the Songwriters Hall of Fame.

== Major associations ==
=== Academy Awards ===
The Academy Awards, or "Oscars", is an annual American awards ceremony hosted by the Academy of Motion Picture Arts and Sciences (AMPAS) to recognize excellence in cinematic achievements in the United States film industry as assessed by the Academy's voting membership.

Year	Category	Nominated work	Result	Ref.
2016	Best Original Song	"Can't Stop the Feeling!" (with Max Martin and Shellback)	Nominated	

=== Emmy Awards ===
The Emmy Award, often referred to simply as the Emmy, is a television production award, similar in nature to the Peabody Awards but more focused on entertainment, and is considered the television equivalent to the Academy Awards (for film), Grammy Awards (for music), and the Tony Awards (for theatre). Justin Timberlake has received four awards from eight nominations.

Year	Category	Nominated work	Result	Ref.
2007	Outstanding Original Music and Lyrics	Saturday Night Live for "Dick in a Box"	Won	
2009	Outstanding Original Music and Lyrics	2008 ESPY Awards for "I Love Sports"	Nominated	
2009	Outstanding Original Music and Lyrics	Saturday Night Live for "Motherlover"	Nominated	
2009	Outstanding Guest Actor in a Comedy Series	Saturday Night Live	Won	
2011	Outstanding Guest Actor in a Comedy Series	Saturday Night Live	Won	
2011	Outstanding Original Music and Lyrics	Saturday Night Live for "Opening monologue"	Won	
2011	Outstanding Original Music and Lyrics	Saturday Night Live	Nominated	
2013	Outstanding Guest Actor in a Comedy Series	Saturday Night Live	Nominated	

=== Grammy Awards ===
The Grammy Awards are awarded annually by The Recording Academy of the United States for outstanding achievements in the music industry. Considered the highest music honor, the awards were established in 1958. Justin Timberlake has won 10 awards out of 40 nominations. His wins include categories on the pop, dance, R&B, and visual media fields. 8 nominations as part of NSYNC are counted. Two of Timberlake's studio albums have been nominated for Album of the Year so far: Justified in 2004, and FutureSex/LoveSounds in 2007.

Year	Category	Nominated work	Result	Ref.
2000	Best Pop Collaboration with Vocals	"Music of My Heart"	Nominated	
2000	Best Country Collaboration with Vocals	"God Must Have Spent a Little More Time on You"	Nominated	
2001	Record of the Year	"Bye Bye Bye"	Nominated	
2001	Best Pop Performance by a Duo or Group with Vocals	"Bye Bye Bye"	Nominated	
2001	Best Pop Vocal Album	No Strings Attached	Nominated	
2002	Best Pop Collaboration with Vocals	"My Kind of Girl" (with Brian McKnight)	Nominated	
2002	Best Pop Performance by a Duo or Group with Vocals	"Gone"	Nominated	
2002	Best Pop Vocal Album	Celebrity	Nominated	
2003	Best Rap/Sung Collaboration	"Like I Love You" (with Clipse)	Nominated	
2003	Best Pop Performance by a Duo or Group with Vocals	"Girlfriend"	Nominated	
2004	Album of the Year	Justified	Nominated	
2004	Best Pop Vocal Album	Justified	Won	
2004	Best Male Pop Vocal Performance	"Cry Me a River"	Won	
2004	Record of the Year	"Where Is the Love?" (with The Black Eyed Peas)	Nominated	
2004	Best Rap/Sung Collaboration	"Where Is the Love?" (with The Black Eyed Peas)	Nominated	
2007	Album of the Year	FutureSex/LoveSounds	Nominated	
2007	Best Pop Vocal Album	FutureSex/LoveSounds	Nominated	
2007	Best Rap/Sung Collaboration	"My Love" (with T.I.)	Won	
2007	Best Dance Recording	"SexyBack"	Won	
2008	Best Rap Song	"Ayo Technology" (with 50 Cent)	Nominated	
2008	Best Pop Collaboration with Vocals	"Give It to Me" (with Timbaland & Nelly Furtado)	Nominated	
2008	Best Dance Recording	"LoveStoned/I Think She Knows"	Won	
2008	Record of the Year	"What Goes Around... Comes Around"	Nominated	
2008	Best Male Pop Vocal Performance	"What Goes Around... Comes Around"	Won	
2009	Best Pop Collaboration with Vocals	"4 Minutes" (with Madonna)	Nominated	
2010	Best Rap Song	"Dead and Gone" (with T.I.)	Nominated	
2010	Best Rap/Sung Collaboration	"Dead and Gone" (with T.I.)	Nominated	
2010	Best Pop Collaboration with Vocals	"Love Sex Magic" (with Ciara)	Nominated	
2014	Best Pop Vocal Album	The 20/20 Experience – The Complete Experience	Nominated	
2014	Best Pop Solo Performance	"Mirrors"	Nominated	
2014	Best Pop Duo/Group Performance	"Suit & Tie" (with Jay Z)	Nominated	
2014	Best Music Video	"Suit & Tie" (with Jay Z)	Won	
2014	Best R&B Song	"Pusher Love Girl"	Won	
2014	Best Rap/Sung Collaboration	"Holy Grail" (with Jay Z)	Won	
2014	Best Rap Song	"Holy Grail" (with Jay Z)	Nominated	
2015	Album of the Year	Beyoncé (as producer)	Nominated	
2015	Album of the Year	G I R L (as featured artist)	Nominated	
2017	Best Song Written for Visual Media	"Can't Stop the Feeling!"	Won	
2019	Best Pop Duo/Group Performance	"Say Something" (with Chris Stapleton)	Nominated	
2025	Best Song Written For Visual Media	"Better Place"	Nominated	

=== Golden Globe Awards ===
The Golden Globe Award is an American accolade bestowed by the 93 members of the Hollywood Foreign Press Association (HFPA) recognizing excellence in film and television, both domestic and foreign. The annual formal ceremony and dinner at which the awards are presented is a major part of the film industry's awards season, which culminates each year with the Academy Awards.

Year	Category	Nominated work	Result	Ref.
2014	Best Original Song	"Please Mr. Kennedy" (with Ed Rush, George Cromarty, T Bone Burnett & Joel Coen and Ethan Coen)	Nominated	
2017	Best Original Song	"Can't Stop the Feeling!" (with Max Martin and Shellback)	Nominated	

=== Screen Actors Guild Award ===
The Screen Actors Guild Award (also known as the SAG Award) is an accolade given by the Screen Actors Guild‐American Federation of Television and Radio Artists (SAG-AFTRA) to recognize outstanding performances by its members. Justin Timberlake has been nominated once.

Year	Category	Nominated work	Result	Ref.
2011	Outstanding Performance by a Cast in a Motion Picture	The Social Network	Nominated	

== Miscellaneous awards ==
=== 4Music Video Honours ===
The Music Video Honours is an annual music awards show by 4Music, a music and entertainment channel in the United Kingdom.

Year	Category	Nominated work	Result	Ref.
2014	Best Boy	Justin Timberlake	Nominated	

=== AICE Awards ===
Year	Category	Nominated work	Result	Ref.
2014	Best Music Video	"Mirrors"	Nominated	
2017	Best Music Video	"Can't Stop the Feeling!"	Nominated	

=== American Music Awards ===
The American Music Awards is an annual awards ceremony created by Dick Clark in 1973 and one of several annual major American music awards shows (among the others are the Grammy Awards, the MTV Video Music Awards etc.). Justin Timberlake has won seven awards out of thirteen nominations.

Year	Category	Nominated work	Result	Ref.
2003	Fan Choice Award	Justin Timberlake	Nominated	
2003	Favorite Pop/Rock Male Artist	Justin Timberlake	Nominated	
2003	International Artist of the Year Award	Justin Timberlake	Nominated	
2003	Favorite Pop/Rock Album	Justified	Won	
2007	Favorite Pop/Rock Male Artist	Justin Timberlake	Won	
2007	Favorite Pop/Rock Album	FutureSex/LoveSounds	Won	
2007	Favorite Soul/R&B Album	FutureSex/LoveSounds	Won	
2013	Artist of the Year	Justin Timberlake	Nominated	
2013	Favorite Pop/Rock Male Artist	Justin Timberlake	Won	
2013	Favorite Soul/R&B Male Artist	Justin Timberlake	Won	
2013	Favorite Pop/Rock Album	The 20/20 Experience	Nominated	
2013	Favorite Soul/R&B Album	The 20/20 Experience	Won	
2017	Top Soundtrack	Trolls: Original Motion Picture Soundtrack	Nominated	

=== Apple Inc. ===
American multinational corporation Apple Inc. releases its own annual editorial year-end best-of list from their media library and management application iTunes, unveiled on the global virtual store along with lists of its most-downloaded content.

Year	Category	Nominated work	Result	Ref.
2013	Best Musical Performer	Justin Timberlake	Won	

=== APRA Music Awards ===
The APRA Awards are several award ceremonies run in Australia by Australian Performing Right Association, which includes the APRA Music Awards, to recognise composing and songwriting skills, sales and airplay performance by its members annually.

Year	Category	Nominated work	Result	Ref.
2017	International Work of the Year	"Can't Stop the Feeling!"	Nominated	

=== ASCAP Awards ===
The American Society of Composers, Authors and Publishers (ASCAP) is a not-for-profit performance rights organization that protects its members' musical copyrights by monitoring public performances of their music, whether via a broadcast or live performance, and compensating them accordingly.

Year	Category	Nominated work	Result	Ref.
ASCAP Pop Music Awards
2003	Most Performed Songs	"Girlfriend"	Won	
2003	Most Performed Songs	"Gone"	Won	
2004	Most Performed Songs	"Cry Me a River"	Won	
2004	Most Performed Songs	"Rock Your Body"	Won	
2007	Most Performed Songs	"My Love"	Won	
2007	Most Performed Songs	"SexyBack"	Won	
2008	Most Performed Songs	"Give It to Me"	Won	
2008	Most Performed Songs	"My Love"	Won	
2008	Most Performed Songs	"Summer Love/Set The Mood"	Won	
2008	Most Performed Songs	"Until The End Of Time"	Won	
2008	Most Performed Songs	"What Goes Around... Comes Around"	Won	
2010	Most Performed Songs	"Dead and Gone"	Won	
2011	Most Performed Songs	"Carry Out"	Won	
2014	Most Performed Songs	"Holy Grail"	Won	
2014	Most Performed Songs	"Mirrors"	Won	
2014	Most Performed Songs	"Suit & Tie"	Won	
2015	Most Performed Songs	"Mirrors"	Won	
2015	Most Performed Songs	"Not a Bad Thing"	Won	
2017	Most Performed Songs	"Can't Stop the Feeling!"	Won	
2018	Most Performed Songs	"Can't Stop the Feeling!"	Won	
ASCAP Rhythm & Soul Awards
2008	Award Winning R&B/Hip-Hop Songs	"My Love"	Won	
2008	Award Winning R&B/Hip-Hop Songs	"Until The End of Time"	Won	
2010	Award Winning R&B/Hip-Hop Songs	"Dead and Gone"	Won	
2010	Award Winning Rap Songs	"Dead and Gone"	Won	
2014	Award Winning R&B/Hip-Hop Songs	"Holy Grail"	Won	
2014	Award Winning R&B/Hip-Hop Songs	"Suit & Tie"	Won	
2014	Award Winning R&B/Hip-Hop Songs	"Take Back the Night"	Won	
2014	"Holy Grail"	Top Rap Song	Won	
2015	Award Winning R&B/Hip-Hop Songs	"Partition"	Won	

=== BBC Music Awards ===
The BBC Music Awards are the BBC's annual pop music awards, held every December, as a celebration of the musical achievements over the past twelve months. The event is coordinated by the BBC's music division, BBC Music.

Year	Category	Nominated work	Result	Ref.
2016	Song of the Year	"Can't Stop the Feeling!"	Nominated	

=== BBC Radio 1Xtra Hot Summer Awards ===
BBC Radio 1Xtra Hot Summer Awards have been handed out since 2013 by BBC Radio 1Xtra, a British digital radio station by the British Broadcasting Corporation (BBC) specialising in urban music.

Year	Category	Nominated work	Result	Ref.
2013	Hottie Guest Winner	"Holy Grail" (with Jay Z)	Nominated	

=== Berlin Music Video Awards ===
Year	Category	Nominated work	Result	Ref.
2018	Best VFX	Filthy	Nominated	

=== BET Awards ===
The BET Awards were established in 2001 by the Black Entertainment Television network to celebrate African Americans and other minorities in music, acting, sports, and other fields of entertainment over the past year. Justin Timberlake has been nominated eight times.

Year	Category	Nominated work	Result	Ref.
2003	Best New Artist	Justin Timberlake	Nominated	
2003	Best R&B Male Artist	Justin Timberlake	Nominated	
2013	Best R&B Male Artist	Justin Timberlake	Nominated	
2013	Best Collaboration	"Suit & Tie" (with Jay Z)	Nominated	
2013	Video of the Year	"Suit & Tie" (with Jay Z)	Nominated	
2013	Viewer's Choice	"Suit & Tie" (with Jay Z)	Nominated	
2014	Best Male R&B/Pop Artist	Justin Timberlake	Nominated	
2014	Best Collaboration	"Holy Grail" (with Jay Z)	Nominated	
BET Hip Hop Awards
2014	Best Collabo, Duo or Group	"Holy Grail" (with Jay Z)	Nominated	

=== Billboard Awards ===
The Billboard Music Awards are sponsored by Billboard magazine and is based on sales data by Nielsen SoundScan and radio information by Nielsen Broadcast Data Systems. Justin Timberlake has won nine awards out of twenty-six nominations. The Billboard.com Mid-Year Music Awards are held by Billboard to recognize the most favorite artists, songs, albums and performances of the first half of year. Winners are selected through a poll in Billboard official website. Justin Timberlake has been nominated seven times. The Billboard Touring Awards is an annual meeting sponsored by Billboard which also honors the top international live entertainment industry artists and professionals.

Year	Category	Nominated work	Result	Ref.
Billboard Music Awards
2003	Artist of the Year	Justin Timberlake	Nominated	
2003	New Artist of the Year	Justin Timberlake	Nominated	
2003	Hot 100 Male Artist of the Year	Justin Timberlake	Nominated	
2006	Top Pop Artist - Male	Justin Timberlake	Nominated	
2006	Top Digital Album Artist	Justin Timberlake	Nominated	
2006	Top Hot 100 Singles Artist - Male	Justin Timberlake	Nominated	
2006	Top Digital Album	FutureSex/LoveSounds	Nominated	
2014	Top Artist	Justin Timberlake	Won	
2014	Top Male Artist	Justin Timberlake	Won	
2014	Top Hot 100 Artist	Justin Timberlake	Nominated	
2014	Top Radio Songs Artist	Justin Timberlake	Won	
2014	Top R&B Artist	Justin Timberlake	Won	
2014	Top Billboard 200 Artist	Justin Timberlake	Won	
2014	Top Billboard 200 Album	The 20/20 Experience	Won	
2014	Top R&B Album	The 20/20 Experience	Won	
2014	Top R&B Album	The 20/20 Experience (2 of 2)	Nominated	
2014	Top Radio Song	"Mirrors"	Nominated	
2014	Top R&B Song	"Suit & Tie" (with Jay Z)	Nominated	
2014	Top Rap Song	"Holy Grail" (with Jay Z)	Nominated	
2015	Top Male Artist	Justin Timberlake	Nominated	
2015	Top Touring Artist	Justin Timberlake	Nominated	
2017	Top Hot 100 Song	"Can't Stop the Feeling!"	Nominated	
2017	Top Selling Song	"Can't Stop the Feeling!"	Won	
2017	Top Radio Song	"Can't Stop the Feeling!"	Won	
2017	Top Song Sales Artist	Justin Timberlake	Nominated	
2017	Top Soundtrack/Cast Album	Trolls: Original Motion Picture Soundtrack	Nominated	
Billboard.com Mid-Year Music Awards
2013	Best Comeback	Justin Timberlake	Nominated	
2013	Best Style	Justin Timberlake	Nominated	
2013	First-Half MVP	Justin Timberlake	Nominated	
2013	Most Overrated Artist	Justin Timberlake	Nominated	
2013	Favorite No. 1 Billboard 200 Album	The 20/20 Experience	Nominated	
2013	Most Anticipated Music Event of 2013's Second Half	The 20/20 Experience – 2 of 2	Nominated	
2013	Most Anticipated Music Event of 2013's Second Half	Legends of the Summer Stadium Tour (with Jay Z)	Nominated	
Billboard Touring Awards
2007	Breakthrough	Justin Timberlake	Won	
2014	Best Tour	Justin Timberlake	Nominated	
2014	Best Draw	Justin Timberlake	Nominated	

=== Bravo A-List Awards ===
Bravo A-List Awards were presented by Bravo.

Year	Category	Nominated work	Result	Ref.
2009	Style Male	Justin Timberlake	Won	

=== Bravo Otto ===
Bravo Otto award is a German accolade honoring excellence of performers in film, television and music. Presented annually since 1957, winners are selected by the readers of Bravo magazine. The award is presented in gold, silver and bronze.

Year	Category	Nominated work	Result	Ref.
2003	Male Singer	Justin Timberlake	Gold	
2006	Male Singer	Justin Timberlake	Gold	
2007	Male Singer	Justin Timberlake	Silver	

=== Brit Awards ===
The Brit Awards are the British Phonographic Industry's (BPI) annual pop music awards. Justin Timberlake has received three awards from six nominations.

Year	Category	Nominated work	Result	Ref.
2004	International Male	Justin Timberlake	Won	
2004	Best Pop Act	Justin Timberlake	Nominated	
2004	International Album	Justified	Won	
2007	International Male Solo Artist	Justin Timberlake	Won	
2007	International Album	FutureSex/LoveSounds	Nominated	
2014	International Male Solo Artist	Justin Timberlake	Nominated	

=== Camerimage ===
The International Film Festival of the Art of Cinematography Camerimage is a festival taking place in Poland and dedicated to the celebration of cinematography and recognition of its creators, cinematographers. The Camerimage festival spans over a course of one week, with multiple events at one time. Timberlake has two nominations.

Year	Category	Nominated work	Result	Ref.
2013	Best Music Video	"Suit & Tie" (with Jay Z)	Nominated	
2018	Best Music Video	"Say Something" (with Chris Stapleton)	Nominated	

=== Cedars-Sinai Board of Governors Gala ===
The Gala benefits the Board of Governors Heart Stem Cell Center at Cedars-Sinai Medical Center.

Year	Category	Nominated work	Result	Ref.
2009	Heart of Hollywood Award	Justin Timberlake	Won	

=== Channel V Thailand Music Video Awards ===
The Channel V Thailand Music Video Awards were established in 2002 by Channel V Thailand.

Year	Category	Nominated work	Result	Ref.
2004	Popular Male Artist	Justin Timberlake	Won	

=== CMT Music Awards ===
The CMT Music Awards is a fan-voted awards show for country music videos and television performances.

Year	Category	Nominated work	Result	Ref.
2018	Video of the Year	"Say Something" (featuring Chris Stapleton)	Nominated	
2018	Collaborative Video of the Year	"Say Something" (featuring Chris Stapleton)	Nominated	

=== Costume Designers Guild Awards ===
Year	Category	Nominated work	Result	Ref.
2019	Excellence in Short Film Design	Supplies	Nominated	

=== Critics' Choice Awards ===
The Critics' Choice Awards (formerly known as the Broadcast Film Critics Association Awards) is an awards show presented annually by the Broadcast Film Critics Association (BFCA) to honor the finest in cinematic achievement. The Broadcast Film Critics Association (BFCA) is an association of approximately 250 television, radio and online critics. Founded in 1995, it is the largest film critics organization in the United States and Canada.

Year	Category	Nominated work	Result	Ref.
2011	Best Acting Ensemble	The Social Network	Nominated	
2013	Best Song	"Please Mr. Kennedy"	Nominated	
2016	Best Song	"Can't Stop the Feeling!"	Nominated	

=== DanceStar Awards ===
Year	Category	Nominated work	Result	Ref.
2003	Best Chart Act	Justin Timberlake	Won	
2003	Best Remix (International)	Like I Love You (with Clipse)	Nominated	
2004	Best Remix (International)	Rock Your Body	Won	

=== Danish Music Awards ===
The Danish Music Awards (DMA) is a Danish award show, arranged by the IFPI since 1989.

Year	Category	Nominated work	Result	Ref.
2003	Year's New Foreign Name	Justin Timberlake	Nominated	
2003	Foreign Album of the Year	Justified	Nominated	
2007	Foreign Album of the Year	FutureSex/LoveSounds	Won	

=== Denver Film Critics Society ===
The Denver Film Critics Society is an organization of film critics based in Denver, Colorado.

Year	Category	Nominated work	Result	Ref.
2017	Best Original Song	Can't Stop the Feeling!	Nominated	

=== ECHO Awards ===
An ECHO is a German music award granted every year by the Deutsche Phono-Akademie (an association of recording companies). Each year's winner is determined by the previous year's sales. The ECHO is the successor to the Deutscher Schallplattenpreis (German Record Award).

Year	Category	Nominated work	Result	Ref.
2004	Best International Rock/Pop Artist of the Year	Justin Timberlake	Nominated	
2007	Best International Rock/Pop Artist of the Year	Justin Timberlake	Nominated	
2014	Best International Rock/Pop Artist of the Year	Justin Timberlake	Nominated	

=== Environmental Media Awards ===
The Environmental Media Awards is an award ceremony which celebrates the entertainment industry's environmental efforts. Timberlake has received the Futures Award for his green-conscious Tennessee golf course.

Year	Category	Nominated work	Result	Ref.
2011	Futures Award	Justin Timberlake	Won	

=== Ethnic Multicultural Media Academy ===
Year	Category	Nominated work	Result	Ref.
2003	Best International Music Act / Production	Justin Timberlake	Won	

=== Fashion Group International's Night of The Stars Gala ===
The Night of The Stars Gala is held by the Fashion Group International. Timberlake has received the Lord & Taylor's Fashion Oracle Award in recognition for his clothing line William Rast.

Year	Category	Nominated work	Result	Ref.
2015	Lord & Taylor's Fashion Oracle Award	Justin Timberlake	Won	

=== Fryderyk ===
The Fryderyk is a music award ceremony presented by Polish Society of the Phonographic Industry since 1995.

Year	Category	Nominated work	Result	Ref.
2006	Best Foreign Album	FutureSex/LoveSounds	Nominated	
2019	Best Foreign Album	Man of the Woods	Nominated	

=== GAFFA Awards ===
Year	Category	Nominated work	Result	Ref.
GAFFA Awards (Denmark)
2006	International Male Artist of the Year	Justin Timberlake	Won	
2013	International Male Artist of the Year	Justin Timberlake	Won	
2013	International Album of the Year	The 20/20 Experience	Won	
2016	International Hit of the Year	"Can't Stop the Feeling!"	Won	
GAFFA Awards (Norway)
2018	Best International Solo Artist of the Year	Justin Timberlake	Nominated	
GAFFA Awards (Sweden)
2019	Best International Solo Artist of the Year	Justin Timberlake	Nominated	

=== Gaygalan Awards ===
Since 1999, the Gaygalan Awards are a Swedish accolade presented by the QX magazine.

Year	Category	Nominated work	Result	Ref.
2017	International Song of the Year	"Can't Stop the Feeling!"	Won	

=== GLSEN Annual Respect Awards ===
Gay, Lesbian and Straight Education Network organizes the annual GLSEN Respect Awards to honor personalities and organizations considered committed allies to the LGBT community.

Year	Category	Nominated work	Result	Ref.
2015	Inspiration Award	Justin Timberlake and Jessica Biel	Won	

=== Groovevolt Music and Fashion Awards ===
Year	Category	Nominated work	Result	Ref.
2004	Best Album - Male	Justified	Won	
2004	Best Deep Cut	"Never Again"	Nominated	
2004	Best Song Performance - Male	"Cry Me a River"	Won	

=== Guild of Music Supervisors Awards ===
The Guild of Music Supervisors Awards recognize music supervisors in 14 categories, representing movies, television, games and trailers.

Year	Category	Nominated work	Result	Ref.
2017	Best Song/Recording Created for a Film	"Can't Stop the Feeling!"	Nominated	

=== GQ Men of the Year Awards ===
British magazine GQ launched their annual Men of the Year awards in 2009.

Year	Category	Nominated work	Result	Ref.
2003	Showman of the Year	Justin Timberlake	Won	
2006	International Man of the Year	Justin Timberlake	Won	
2013	#Hashtag of the Year	Justin Timberlake	Won	

=== The Recording Academy Honors ===
The Recording Academy Honors Award was established to celebrate outstanding individuals whose work embodies excellence and integrity and who have improved the environment for the creative community.

Year	Category	Nominated work	Result	Ref.
2005	Memphis Chapter's The Recording Academy Honors	Justin Timberlake	Won	

=== Hasty Pudding Theatricals Awards ===
The Hasty Pudding Man of the Year award is bestowed annually by the Hasty Pudding Theatricals society at Harvard University.

Year	Category	Nominated work	Result	Ref.
2010	Man of the Year	Justin Timberlake	Won	

=== Helpmann Awards ===
Year	Category	Nominated work	Result	Ref.
2008	Best International Contemporary Concert	Justin Timberlake	Nominated	

=== Hollywood Film Awards ===
The Hollywood Film Awards are an American motion picture award ceremony held annually since 1997. In 2016, Timberlake was honored with the Hollywood Song Award for "Can't Stop the Feeling!".

Year	Category	Nominated work	Result	Ref.
2010	Ensemble of the Year	The Social Network	Won	
2016	Hollywood Song Award	"Can't Stop the Feeling!"	Won	

=== Hollywood Music in Media Awards ===
The Hollywood Music in Media Awards (HMMA) honors music in film, TV, video games, commercials and trailers.

Year	Category	Nominated work	Result	Ref.
2016	Best Song Written for an Animated Film	"Can't Stop the Feeling!"	Won	
2016	Best Soundtrack from a Movie	Trolls: Original Motion Picture Soundtrack	Nominated	
2016	Outstanding Music Supervision – Film	Justin Timberlake	Nominated	

=== Hungarian Music Awards ===
The Hungarian Music Awards have been given to artists in the field of Hungarian music since 1992.

Year	Category	Nominated work	Result	Ref.
2008	Pop Album of the Year	FutureSex/LoveSounds	Nominated	
2017	Modern Pop-Rock Album/Record of the Year	"Can't Stop the Feeling!"	Nominated	

=== IFPI Hong Kong Top Sales Music Award ===
Presented by the International Federation of the Phonographic Industry representing the recording industry in Hong Kong.

Year	Category	Nominated work	Result	Ref.
2006	Ten Best Sales Releases, Foreign	FutureSex/LoveSounds	Won	

=== IHeartRadio Much Music Video Awards ===
The iHeartRadio Much Music Video Awards (formerly known as MuchMusic Video Awards) is an annual awards ceremony presented by the Canadian music video channel MuchMusic. Justin Timberlake has been nominated four times.

Year	Category	Nominated work	Result	Ref.
2007	International Video of the Year - Artist	"What Goes Around... Comes Around"	Nominated	
2008	International Video of the Year - Artist	"4 Minutes" (with Madonna)	Nominated	
2013	International Video of the Year - Artist	"Mirrors"	Nominated	
2018	Best Director	"Say Something" (featuring Chris Stapleton, with director Arturo Perez Jr.)	Nominated	

=== IHeartRadio Music Awards ===
The iHeartRadio Music Awards is an American music awards show debuting in 2014. Justin Timberlake received the Innovator Award at the second ceremony.

Year	Category	Nominated work	Result	Ref.
2014	Artist of the Year	Justin Timberlake	Nominated	
2014	Song of the Year	"Mirrors"	Nominated	
2014	Best Collaboration	"Suit & Tie" (featuring Jay Z)	Nominated	
2014	Best Collaboration	"Holy Grail" (with Jay Z)	Nominated	
2014	Hip Hop/R&B Song of the Year	"Holy Grail" (with Jay Z)	Nominated	
2015	Justin Timberlake	Innovator Award	Won	
2016	Biggest Triple Threat	Justin Timberlake	Nominated	
2017	Song of the Year	"Can't Stop the Feeling!"	Won	
2017	Best Song from a Movie	"Can't Stop the Feeling!"	Nominated	
2017	Best Music Video	"Can't Stop the Feeling!"	Nominated	

=== InStyle Social Media Awards ===
These are awarded by the InStyle magazine.

Year	Category	Nominated work	Result	Ref.
2014	The Sexiest Man of Style	Justin Timberlake	Won	

=== International Dance Music Awards ===
The International Dance Music Awards were established in 1985. It is a part of the Winter Music Conference, a weeklong electronic music event held annually.

Year	Category	Nominated work	Result	Ref.
2003	Best Dance Artist Solo	Justin Timberlake	Nominated	
2003	Best Pop Dance Track	"Like I Love You"	Nominated	
2003	Best R&B/Urban Track	"Like I Love You"	Nominated	
2004	Best Pop	"Rock Your Body"	Won	
2007	Best Dance Solo Artist	Justin Timberlake	Nominated	
2007	Best R&B/Urban Dance Track	"SexyBack"	Won	
2007	Best Pop Dance Track	"SexyBack"	Won	
2008	Best R&B/Urban Dance Track	"LoveStoned"	Nominated	
2008	Best Pop Dance Track	"LoveStoned"	Nominated	
2008	Best Rap/Hip Hop Dance Track	"Ayo Technology" (with 50 Cent)	Nominated	
2009	Best Pop Dance Track	"4 Minutes" (with Madonna)	Nominated	
2014	Best R&B/Urban Dance Track	"Suit & Tie" (with Jay-Z)	Nominated	
2014	Best R&B/Urban Dance Track	"Mirrors"	Nominated	

=== JIM Awards ===
The JIM Awards are an annual awards show presented by the Flemish TV channel JIM. Timberlake has 4 nominations.

Year	Category	Nominated work	Result	Ref.
2014	Best Male – International	Justin Timberlake	Nominated	
2014	Best Pop	Justin Timberlake	Nominated	
2014	Best Dressed Male	Justin Timberlake	Nominated	
2014	Best Video	"Mirrors"	Nominated	

=== Juice TV Awards ===
The Juice TV Awards was an annual New Zealand music video award presentation.

Year	Category	Nominated work	Result	Ref.
2003	Video Artist of the Year	Justin Timberlake	Won	

=== Juno Awards ===
The Juno Awards are presented annually to Canadian musical artists. There are also international categories.

Year	Category	Nominated work	Result	Ref.
2007	International Album of the Year	FutureSex/LoveSounds	Nominated	

=== Memphis Music Hall of Fame ===
Timberlake was inducted into the Memphis Music Hall of Fame, museum administered by the Memphis Rock N' Soul Museum, in 2015. Each inductee receives the Mike Curb Award.

Year	Category	Nominated work	Result	Ref.
2015	Mike Curb Award	Justin Timberlake	Won	

=== Meteor Ireland Music Awards ===
The Meteor Ireland Music Awards is an annual awards ceremony from the IRMA. Justin Timberlake received two awards.

Year	Category	Nominated work	Result	Ref.
2004	Best Male Singer	Justin Timberlake	Won	
2004	Best Live Performance	Justin Timberlake	Nominated	
2007	International Male Artist	Justin Timberlake	Won	
2007	Best Live Performance	Justin Timberlake	Nominated	

=== MTV Awards ===
Year	Category	Nominated work	Result	Ref.
MTV Asia Music Awards
2004	Favorite Male Artist	Justin Timberlake	Nominated	
2004	Favorite Video	"Cry Me a River"	Nominated	
2008	Favourite International Artist of Asia	Justin Timberlake	Nominated	
MTV Australia Music Awards
2007	Album of the Year	FutureSex/LoveSounds	Nominated	
2007	Sexiest Video	"SexyBack" (featuring Timbaland)	Nominated	
2007	Best Hook Up	"SexyBack" (featuring Timbaland)	Won	
2007	Video of the Year	"What Goes Around.../...Comes Around"	Nominated	
2007	Best Male Artist	"What Goes Around.../...Comes Around"	Nominated	
2007	Best Pop Video	"What Goes Around.../...Comes Around"	Nominated	
2008	MTV Live Performer	FutureSex/LoveShow Tour	Nominated	
2008	Video of the Year	"Ayo Technology" (with 50 Cent & Timbaland)	Nominated	
2009	Best Moves	"4 Minutes" (with Madonna)	Nominated	
MTV Brazil Music Awards
2007	Best International Act	Justin Timberlake	Nominated	
MTV Europe Music Awards
2003	Best New Act	Justin Timberlake	Nominated	
2003	Best Male	Justin Timberlake	Won	
2003	Best Pop	Justin Timberlake	Won	
2003	Best Album	Justified	Won	
2003	Best Song	"Cry Me a River"	Nominated	
2005	Best Song	"Signs" (with Snoop Dogg and Charlie Wilson)	Nominated	
2006	Best Male	Justin Timberlake	Won	
2006	Best Pop	Justin Timberlake	Won	
2007	Best Live Act	Justin Timberlake	Nominated	
2007	Best Solo	Justin Timberlake	Nominated	
2007	Best Urban	Justin Timberlake	Nominated	
2007	Video Star	"What Goes Around... Comes Around"	Nominated	
2008	Video Star	"4 Minutes" (with Madonna)	Nominated	
2013	Best Male	Justin Timberlake	Nominated	
2013	Best Live Act	Justin Timberlake	Nominated	
2013	Best Look	Justin Timberlake	Nominated	
2013	Best US Act	Justin Timberlake	Nominated	
2013	"Mirrors"	Best Video	Nominated	
2014	Best Male	Justin Timberlake	Nominated	
2014	Best Live Act	Justin Timberlake	Nominated	
MTV Italian Music Awards
2007	Man of the Year	Justin Timberlake	Nominated	
2008	Man of the Year	Justin Timberlake	Nominated	
2014	Artist Saga	Justin Timberlake	Nominated	
2016	#MTVAwardsStar	Justin Timberlake	Nominated	
MTV Japan Video Music Awards
2003	Best Male Video	"Like I Love You"	Nominated	
2003	Best Pop Video	"Like I Love You"	Nominated	
2004	Best Male Video	"Rock Your Body"	Nominated	
2007	Best Male Video	"SexyBack"	Nominated	
2007	Best Dance Video	"SexyBack"	Nominated	
2008	Video of the Year	"What Goes Around... Comes Around"	Nominated	
2008	Best Male Video	"What Goes Around... Comes Around"	Nominated	
2008	Best Hip-Hop Video	"Ayo Technology" (with 50 Cent & Timbaland)	Nominated	
2009	Best Collaboration	"4 Minutes" (with Madonna)	Nominated	
2014	Best Male Video	"Take Back the Night"	Nominated	
2014	Best Choreography	"Take Back the Night"	Nominated	
2016	Best Male Video International	"Can't Stop the Feeling!"	Nominated	
MTV Latinoamérica Video Music Awards
2003	Best Pop Artist — International	Justin Timberlake	Nominated	
2007	Best Pop Artist — International	Justin Timberlake	Nominated	
MTV Russia Music Awards
2007	Best Foreign Artist	Justin Timberlake	Nominated	

=== MTV Movie & TV Awards ===
The MTV Movie & TV Awards is a film and television awards show presented annually on MTV. Justin Timberlake received three nominations.

Year	Category	Nominated work	Result	Ref.
2007	Best Breakthrough Performance	Alpha Dog	Nominated	
2011	Best Line From a Movie	The Social Network	Nominated	
2017	Best Musical Moment	"Can't Stop the Feeling!"	Nominated	

=== MTV Video Music Awards ===
The MTV Video Music Awards were established in 1984 by MTV to celebrate the top music videos of the year. Justin Timberlake has won eleven awards out of twenty-six nominations.

Year	Category	Nominated work	Result	Ref.
2003	Best Direction in a Video	"Cry Me a River"	Nominated	
2003	Best Pop Video	"Cry Me a River"	Won	
2003	Best Male Video	"Cry Me a River"	Won	
2003	Video of the Year	"Cry Me a River"	Nominated	
2003	Viewer's Choice	"Cry Me a River"	Nominated	
2003	Best Choreography in a Video	"Rock Your Body"	Nominated	
2003	Best Dance Video	"Rock Your Body"	Won	
2004	Best Male Video	"Señorita"	Nominated	
2007	Male Artist of the Year	Justin Timberlake	Won	
2007	Quadruple Threat of the Year	Justin Timberlake	Won	
2007	Best Choreography in a Video	"My Love" (featuring T.I.)	Won	
2007	Most Earthshattering Collaboration	"SexyBack" (featuring Timbaland)	Nominated	
2007	Best Director	"What Goes Around... Comes Around"	Won	
2007	Best Editing in a Video	"What Goes Around... Comes Around"	Nominated	
2007	Video of the Year	"What Goes Around... Comes Around"	Nominated	
2013	Best Pop Video	"Mirrors"	Nominated	
2013	Best Male Video	"Mirrors"	Nominated	
2013	Video of the Year	"Mirrors"	Won	
2013	Best Editing	"Mirrors"	Won	
2013	Best Collaboration	"Suit & Tie" (featuring Jay Z)	Nominated	
2013	Best Direction	"Suit & Tie" (featuring Jay Z)	Won	
2013	Michael Jackson Video Vanguard Award	Justin Timberlake	Won	
2014	Best Choreography	"Love Never Felt So Good" (with Michael Jackson)	Nominated	
2016	Song of Summer	"Can't Stop the Feeling!"	Nominated	
2018	Best Choreography	"Filthy"	Nominated	
2018	Best Direction	"Say Something" (featuring Chris Stapleton)	Nominated	

=== TRL Awards ===
Year	Category	Nominated work	Result	Ref.
2003	Rock the Mic	Justin Timberlake	Won	

=== MOBO Awards ===
The MOBO Award show is held annually in the United Kingdom to recognise artists of any ethnicity or nationality performing black music.

Year	Category	Nominated work	Result	Ref.
2003	Best R&B Act	Justin Timberlake	Won	
2003	Best Album	Justified	Nominated	
2013	Best International Act	Justin Timberlake	Nominated	

=== Myx Music Awards ===
The Myx Music Awards is an accolade presented by the cable channel Myx to honor the biggest hitmakers in the Philippines.

Year	Category	Nominated work	Result	Ref.
2007	Favorite International Music Video ·	"SexyBack"	Nominated	

=== NAACP Image Award ===
An NAACP Image Award is an accolade presented by the American National Association for the Advancement of Colored People to honor outstanding people of color in film, television, music, and literature. Similar to other awards, like the Oscars and the Grammys, the 35 categories of the Image Awards are voted on by the award organization's members (that is, NAACP members). Honorary awards (similar to the Academy Honorary Award) have also been included, such as the President's Award, the Chairman's Award, Entertainer of the Year and The Image Award Hall of Fame.

Year	Category	Nominated work	Result	Ref.
2011	Outstanding Supporting Actor in a Motion Picture	The Social Network	Nominated	
2014	Outstanding Male Artist	Himself	Nominated	
2014	Outstanding Album	The 20/20 Experience	Nominated	
2014	Outstanding Duo or Group	"Suit & Tie" (with Jay Z)	Nominated	
2015	Outstanding Music Video	"Love Never Felt So Good" (with Michael Jackson)	Nominated	
2015	Outstanding Duo or Group	"Brand New" (with Pharrell Williams)	Nominated	

=== Nickelodeon Kids' Choice Awards ===
The Nickelodeon Kids' Choice Awards is an annual awards show, that honors the year's biggest television, movie, and music acts, as voted by the people. Justin Timberlake has won three times out of twenty nominations.

Year	Category	Nominated work	Result	Ref.
2003	Favorite Male Singer	Justin Timberlake	Nominated	
2004	Favorite Male Singer	Justin Timberlake	Nominated	
2007	Favorite Male Singer	Justin Timberlake	Won	
2008	Favorite Male Singer	Justin Timberlake	Nominated	
2011	The Big Help Award	Justin Timberlake	Won	
2014	Favorite Male Singer	Justin Timberlake	Won	
2014	KCA Fan Army	Justin Timberlake	Nominated	
2015	Favorite Male Singer	Justin Timberlake	Nominated	
2017	Favorite Male Singer	Justin Timberlake	Nominated	
2017	Favorite Voice From An Animated Movie	Justin Timberlake	Nominated	
2017	Favorite Frenemies	Justin Timberlake	Nominated	
2017	Favorite Song	"Can't Stop the Feeling!"	Nominated	
2017	Favorite Music Video	"Can't Stop the Feeling!"	Nominated	
2017	Favorite Animated Movie	Trolls	Nominated	
2017	Favorite Soundtrack	Trolls: Original Motion Picture Soundtrack	Nominated	
2019	Favorite Male Artist	Justin Timberlake	Nominated	
2021	Favorite Voice from an Animated Movie	Trolls World Tour	Nominated	
2023	Favorite Music Collaboration	"Stay with Me"	Nominated	
2024	Favorite Male Voice from an Animated Movie	Trolls Band Together	Nominated	
2024	Favorite Male Artist	Justin Timberlake	Nominated	
2024	Favorite Song	"Selfish"	Nominated	
Nickelodeon Australian Kids' Choice Awards
2007	Favorite International Singer	Justin Timberlake	Nominated	
Nickelodeon UK Kids' Choice Awards
2007	Best Male Singer	Justin Timberlake	Nominated	

=== NRJ Music Awards ===
The NRJ Music Awards, created in 2000 by the radio station NRJ in partnership with the television network TF1. Justin Timberlake has won the award three times.

Year	Category	Nominated work	Result	Ref.
2004	International Male Artist of the Year	Justin Timberlake	Won	
2004	International Album of the Year	Justified	Nominated	
2007	International Male Artist of the Year	Justin Timberlake	Won	
2007	International Album of the Year	FutureSex/LoveSounds	Nominated	
2008	International Male Artist of the Year	Justin Timberlake	Won	
2008	International Duo/Group of the Year	50 Cent & Justin Timberlake	Nominated	
2008	Video of the Year	"Ayo Technology" (with 50 Cent & Timbaland)	Nominated	
2013	International Male Artist of the Year	Justin Timberlake	Nominated	
2016	International Male Artist of the Year	Justin Timberlake	Nominated	
2016	International Song of the Year	"Can't Stop the Feeling!"	Nominated	
2018	International Male Artist of the Year	Justin Timberlake	Nominated	

=== Palm Springs International Film Festival ===
Palm Springs International Film Festival is a film festival held in Palm Springs, California. Originally promoted by Mayor Sonny Bono and then sponsored by Nortel Networks Corporation. Justin Timberlake received the Ensemble Cast award.

Year	Category	Nominated work	Result	Ref.
2011	Ensemble Cast	The Social Network	Won	

=== People's Choice Awards ===
The People's Choice Awards is an awards show recognizing the people and the work of popular culture. Justin Timberlake has received fourteen nominations and has won nine People's Choice Awards, including Favorite Album and Favorite Song.

Year	Category	Nominated work	Result	Ref.
2005	Favorite Combined Forces	"Where Is The Love?" (with The Black Eyed Peas)	Nominated	
2007	Favorite R&B Song	"SexyBack"	Won	
2008	Favorite Pop Song	"What Goes Around...Comes Around"	Won	
2008	Favorite Hip-Hop Song	"Give It to Me"	Won	
2008	Favorite Male Singer	Justin Timberlake	Won	
2009	Favorite Combined Forces	"4 Minutes"	Nominated	
2014	Favorite Male Artist	Justin Timberlake	Won	
2014	Favorite Pop Artist	Justin Timberlake	Nominated	
2014	Favorite R&B Artist	Justin Timberlake	Won	
2014	The 20/20 Experience	Favorite Album	Won	
2014	Favorite Song	"Mirrors"	Nominated	
2017	Favorite Male Artist	Justin Timberlake	Won	
2017	Favorite Pop Artist	Justin Timberlake	Nominated	
2017	Favorite Song	"Can't Stop the Feeling!"	Won	

=== Pollstar Awards ===
The Pollstar Concert Industry Awards are held annually by Pollstar, to reward the best in the business of shows and concerts.

Year	Category	Nominated work	Result	Ref.
2003	Most Creative Tour Package	Justin Timberlake	Nominated	
2003	Most Creative Stage Production	Justin Timberlake	Nominated	
2007	Major Tour of the Year	Justin Timberlake	Nominated	
2007	Most Creative Tour Package	Justin Timberlake	Won	
2007	Most Creative Stage Production	Justin Timberlake	Won	
2014	Major Tour of the Year	Justin Timberlake	Nominated	
2014	Most Creative Stage Production	Justin Timberlake	Nominated	
2018	Best Pop Tour	Justin Timberlake	Pending	

=== Pop Awards ===
The Pop Awards are presented annually by Pop Magazine, honoring the best in popular music. Justin Timberlake has won one award from two nominations.

Year	Category	Nominated work	Result	Ref.
2019	Artist of The Year	Justin Timberlake	Nominated	
2019	Song of the Year	"Say Something" (featuring Chris Stapleton)	Won	

=== Premios Oye! ===
Premios Oye! (Premio Nacional a la Música Grabada) are presented annually by the Academia Nacional de la Música en México.

Year	Category	Nominated work	Result	Ref.
2007	Album of the Year	Futuresex/Lovesounds	Nominated	
2008	Record of the Year	"4 Minutes" (with Madonna)	Won	

=== Radio Disney Music Awards ===
The Radio Disney Music Awards is an annual awards show which is operated and governed by Radio Disney.

Year	Category	Nominated work	Result	Ref.
2003	Male with Most Style	Justin Timberlake	Won	
2004	Best Male Artist	Justin Timberlake	Nominated	
2005	Best Male Artist	Justin Timberlake	Nominated	
2007	Best Male Artist	Justin Timberlake	Nominated	
2014	Best Male Artist	Justin Timberlake	Won	
2017	Song of the Year	"Can't Stop the Feeling!"	Nominated	
2017	Best Song That Makes You Smile	"Can't Stop the Feeling!"	Nominated	

=== Radio Music Awards ===
The Radio Music Awards was an annual U.S. award show that honored the year's most successful songs on mainstream radio.

Year	Category	Nominated work	Result	Ref.
2003	Artist of the Year/Top 40 Radio	Justin Timberlake	Won	

=== Rockbjörnen ===
The Rockbjörnen is a music prize in Sweden, divided into several categories, which is awarded annually by the newspaper Aftonbladet.

Year	Category	Nominated work	Result	Ref.
2006	Foreign Artist of the Year	Justin Timberlake	Won	

=== RTHK International Pop Poll Awards ===
The RTHK International Pop Poll Awards is an annual award show presented at RTHK Studio 1 that honors the best in international and national music established in 1989. (Note: At this award show, runners-up are considered winners in spite of being in second or third place.)

Year	Category	Nominated work	Result	Ref.
2013	Top Male Artist	Justin Timberlake	3rd	
2013	Top 10 International Gold Songs	"Suit & Tie"	Nominated	
2014	Top Male Artist	Justin Timberlake	3rd	
2014	Top 10 International Gold Songs	"Mirrors"	Won	
2017	Top Male Artist	Justin Timberlake	3rd	
2017	Top 10 International Gold Songs	"Can't Stop the Feeling!"	Won	

=== San Diego Film Critics Society ===
The San Diego Film Critics Society (SDFCS) is an organization of film reviewers from San Diego–based publications.

Year	Category	Nominated work	Result	Ref.
2010	Best Performance by an Ensemble	The Social Network	Nominated	

=== Satellite Awards ===
The Satellite Awards is an annual award ceremony honoring the year's outstanding performers, films, and television shows, presented by the International Press Academy.

Year	Category	Nominated work	Result	Ref.
2017	Best Original Song	"Can't Stop the Feeling!" (with Max Martin and Shellback)	Nominated	

=== Smash Hits Awards ===
The Smash Hits Awards was an awards ceremony voted by readers of the Smash Hits magazine.

Year	Category	Nominated work	Result	Ref.
2003	Most Fanciable Male	Justin Timberlake	Won	
2003	Best Dancer	Justin Timberlake	Won	
2004	Most Fanciable Male	Justin Timberlake	Nominated	
2004	Best Male Solo	Justin Timberlake	Nominated	

=== Silver Clef Awards ===
The Silver Clef Awards is an annual UK music awards lunch which has been running since 1976.

Year	Category	Nominated work	Result	Ref.
2014	Best Live Act	Justin Timberlake	Won	

=== Songwriters Hall of Fame ===
The Songwriters Hall of Fame's Contemporary Icon Award was established in 2015 to recognize songwriter-artists who attained an iconic status in pop culture.

Year	Category	Nominated work	Result	Ref.
2019	Contemporary Icon Award	Justin Timberlake	Won	

=== Soul Train Music Awards ===
The Soul Train Music Awards is an annual award show which previously aired in national television syndication, and honors the best in music and entertainment. Justin Timberlake has been nominated nine times.

Year	Category	Nominated work	Result	Ref.
2003	Best R&B/Soul Album - Male	Justified	Nominated	
2003	Best R&B/Soul Single - Male	"Like I Love You" (featuring Clipse)	Nominated	
2013	Album of the Year	The 20/20 Experience	Nominated	
2013	Best Dance Performance	"Suit & Tie" (featuring Jay Z)	Nominated	
2013	Song of the Year	"Suit & Tie" (featuring Jay Z)	Nominated	
2013	Best Hip Hop Song of the Year	"Holy Grail" (with Jay Z)	Nominated	
2013	The Ashford and Simpson Songwriters Award	"Mirrors"	Nominated	
2014	Song of the Year	"Love Never Felt So Good" (with Michael Jackson)	Nominated	
2014	Best Collaboration	"Love Never Felt So Good" (with Michael Jackson)	Nominated	

=== Spike Guys' Choice Awards ===
The Spike Guys' Choice Awards (formerly Guy's Choice Awards) is an awards show produced by the Viacom cable channel Spike and held since 2007. Timberlake has won one award.

Year	Category	Nominated work	Result	Ref.
2012	Troops Choice for Entertainer of the Year	Justin Timberlake	Won	

=== TEC Awards ===
The TEC Awards is an annual award show recognizing the achievements of audio professionals. Justin Timberlake has been nominated four times.

Year	Category	Nominated work	Result	Ref.
2007	Record Production/Album	FutureSex/LoveSounds	Nominated	
2008	Tour Sound Production	FutureSex/LoveSounds World Tour	Nominated	
2014	Record Production/Single or Track	"Mirrors"	Nominated	
2014	Tour/Event Sound Production	The 20/20 Experience World Tour	Nominated	

=== Teen Choice Awards ===
The Teen Choice Awards were established in 1999 to honor the year's biggest achievements in music, movies, sports and television, being voted by young people aged between 13 and 19. Justin Timberlake has won 10 awards from 56 nominations. Timberlake received the Ultimate Choice Award at the 2007 show, and received the first-ever Decade Award at the 2016 show; the latter to celebrate his achievements since the release of FutureSex/LoveSounds.

Year	Category	Nominated work	Result	Ref.
2000	Choice Hottie Male	Justin Timberlake	Won	
2001	Choice Hottie Male	Justin Timberlake	Won	
2002	Choice Hottie Male	Justin Timberlake	Won	
2003	Choice Music: Male Artist	Justin Timberlake	Nominated	
2003	Choice Music: Breakout Artist	Justin Timberlake	Nominated	
2003	Choice Music: R&B/Hip-Hop Artist	Justin Timberlake	Nominated	
2003	Choice Hottie Male	Justin Timberlake	Nominated	
2003	Choice Fashion Icon: Male	Justin Timberlake	Nominated	
2003	Justified	Choice Music: Album	Nominated	
2003	Choice Music: Single	"Cry Me a River"	Nominated	
2003	Choice Music: Collaboration	"Cry Me a River"	Nominated	
2003	Choice Music: R&B/Hip-Hop Track	"Like I Love You"	Won	
2004	Choice Music: Male Artist	Justin Timberlake	Won	
2004	Choice Music: R&B Artist	Justin Timberlake	Nominated	
2004	Choice Hottie Male	Justin Timberlake	Nominated	
2004	Choice Male Fashion Icon	Justin Timberlake	Nominated	
2004	Choice Music: Hook Up	"Where Is the Love?" (with The Black Eyed Peas)	Nominated	
2005	Choice Music: Collaboration	Signs (with Snoop Dogg) & (Charlie Wilson)	Nominated	
2006	Choice Hottie Male	Justin Timberlake	Nominated	
2007	Choice Movie Breakout Star – Male	Alpha Dog	Nominated	
2007	Choice Music: Payback Track	"What Goes Around... Comes Around"	Won	
2007	Choice Music: Male Artist	Justin Timberlake	Won	
2007	Ultimate Choice Award	Justin Timberlake	Won	
2007	Choice Music: Single	"Give It to Me"	Nominated	
2008	Choice Music: Male Artist	Justin Timberlake	Nominated	
2008	"4 Minutes" (with Madonna)	Choice Music: Hook Up	Nominated	
2008	"4 Minutes" (with Madonna)	Choice Music: Single	Nominated	
2009	Choice Music: Hook Up	"Love Sex Magic"	Nominated	
2009	Choice Male Red Carpet Fashion Icon	Justin Timberlake	Nominated	
2010	Activist	Justin Timberlake	Nominated	
2010	Choice Red Carpet Fashion Icon Male	Justin Timberlake	Nominated	
2010	Choice Rap/Hip-Hop Track	"Carry Out" (with Timbaland)	Nominated	
2010	William Rast	Choice Celebrity Fashion Line	Nominated	
2011	Actor Comedy	Bad Teacher	Won	
2011	Animation Voice	Yogi Bear	Nominated	
2011	Red Carpet Fashion Icon	Justin Timberlake	Nominated	
2011	Scene Stealer Male	The Social Network	Nominated	
2011	Summer Movie Star	Friends with Benefits	Nominated	
2012	Movie Actor Drama	In Time	Nominated	
2012	Red Carpet Fashion Icon	Justin Timberlake	Nominated	
2013	Choice Music: Male Artist	Justin Timberlake	Nominated	
2013	Choice Summer Music Star: Male	Justin Timberlake	Nominated	
2013	Choice Love Song	"Mirrors"	Nominated	
2013	Choice Single: Male Artist	"Suit & Tie"	Nominated	
2013	Choice Summer Tour	Legends of the Summer Tour	Nominated	
2014	Choice Music: Male Artist	Justin Timberlake	Nominated	
2014	Choice Music: R&B/Hip Hop Artist	Justin Timberlake	Nominated	
2014	Choice Social Media King	Justin Timberlake	Nominated	
2014	Choice Love Song	"Not a Bad Thing"	Nominated	
2014	Choice Summer Tour	The 20/20 Experience World Tour	Nominated	
2015	Social Media King	Justin Timberlake	Nominated	
2015	Choice Twit	Justin Timberlake	Nominated	
2016	Choice Party Song	"Can't Stop the Feeling!"	Nominated	
2016	Choice Song from a Movie or TV Show	"Can't Stop the Feeling!"	Nominated	
2016	Choice Summer Song	"Can't Stop the Feeling!"	Nominated	
2016	Decade Award	Justin Timberlake	Won	
2017	Choice Twit	Justin Timberlake	Nominated	
2018	Choice Song: Male Artist	"Say Something" (with Chris Stapleton)	Nominated	
2018	Choice Instagrammer	Justin Timberlake	Nominated	

=== Telehit Awards ===
Telehit Awards (Spanish: Premios Telehit) are an annual award show run by the Mexican music channel Telehit.

Year	Category	Nominated work	Result	Ref.
2013	International Music Quality Award	Justin Timberlake	Won	
2016	Song of the Year	"Can't Stop the Feeling!"	Nominated	

=== TMF Awards ===
The TMF Awards were an annual television awards show broadcast live on TMF (The Music Factory).

Year	Category	Nominated work	Result	Ref.
2007	Best International Male Artist	Justin Timberlake	Won	
2007	Best Pop International powered by Donna	Justin Timberlake	Nominated	
2007	Best Live International	Justin Timberlake	Nominated	
2007	Best Video International	Lovestoned	Nominated	
2008	Best International Male Artist	Justin Timberlake	Nominated	
2009	Best International Male Artist	Justin Timberlake	Won	

=== UK Music Video Awards ===
The UK Music Video Awards recognise music videos created over the past 12 months across a variety of genres.

Year	Category	Nominated work	Result	Ref.
2013	Best Pop Video – International	"Mirrors"	Nominated	
2018	Best Live Video	"Say Something" (with Chris Stapleton)	Won	

=== V Chart Awards ===
The V Chart Awards is an awards show organised by YinYueTai. The V Chart is the Chinese counterpart to the American Billboard charts and Korean Gaon Charts. Timberlake has been nominated and won ones.

Year	Category	Nominated work	Result	Ref.
2014	Favorite Artist of the Year (Western)	Justin Timberlake	Won	

=== VH1 Big in '06 Awards ===
VH1 Big in '06 Awards was the 2006 annual award show that aired on December 3, 2006, on VH1 in the United States.

Year	Category	Nominated work	Result	Ref.
2006	Big Music Artist	Justin Timberlake	Won	

=== Vibe Music Awards ===
The Vibe Music Awards is a music and entertainment ceremony founded by producer Quincy Jones. The publication predominantly features R&B and hip-hop music artists, actors and other entertainers. Justin Timberlake has been nominated once.

Year	Category	Nominated work	Result	Ref.
Album of the Year	2003	Justified	Nominated	

=== Virgin Media Music Awards ===
The Virgin Media Music Awards is an annual awards ceremony presented by Virgin Media. Justin Timberlake has received five nominations.

Year	Category	Nominated work	Result	Ref.
2006	Best Solo Artist	Justin Timberlake	Nominated	
2006	Most Fanciable Male	Justin Timberlake	Nominated	
2007	Most Fanciable Male	Justin Timberlake	Nominated	
2007	"What Goes Around... Comes Around"	Best Track	Nominated	
2007	"What Goes Around... Comes Around"	Best Video	Nominated	

=== Washington D.C. Area Film Critics Association ===
The Washington D.C. Area Film Critics Association (WAFCA) is a group of film critics based out of Washington, D.C., that was founded in 2002. WAFCA is composed of nearly 50 DC-based film critics from television, radio, print and the internet. The group annually gives awards to the best in film as voted on by its members.

Year	Category	Nominated work	Result	Ref.
2010	Best Ensemble	The Social Network	Nominated	

=== World Music Awards ===
The World Music Awards is an international awards show founded in 1989 that annually honored recording artists based on worldwide sales figures provided by the International Federation of the Phonographic Industry (IFPI). Justin Timberlake has won the award three times.

Year	Category	Nominated work	Result	Ref.
2007	World's Best Selling American Artist	Justin Timberlake	Won	
2007	World's Best Selling Pop Male Artist	Justin Timberlake	Won	
2014	World's Best Entertainer of the Year	Justin Timberlake	Nominated	
2014	World's Best Male Artist	Justin Timberlake	Nominated	
2014	World's Best Album	The 20/20 Experience	Nominated	
2014	World's Best Song	"Suit & Tie"	Nominated	
2014	World's Best Song	"Mirrors"	Nominated	
2014	World's Best Video	"Mirrors"	Nominated	
2014	World's Best-selling Pop Rock Male Artist	Justin Timberlake	Won	
2014	World's Best Song	"Holy Grail"	Nominated	
2014	World's Best Video	"Holy Grail"	Nominated	
2014	World's Best Song	"Take Back the Night"	Nominated	
2014	World's Best Song	"TKO"	Nominated	
2014	World's Best Song	"Tunnel Vision"	Nominated	

=== World Soundtrack Awards ===
The World Soundtrack Awards are given by the World Soundtrack Academy to honor the best movie soundtracks.

Year	Category	Nominated work	Result	Ref.
2017	Best Original Song written directly for a Film	"Can't Stop the Feeling"	Nominated	
