= Kids' Choice Award for Favorite Male Artist =

American television award

This is a list of winners and nominees for the Kids' Choice Award for Favorite Male Artist, given at the Nickelodeon Kids' Choice Awards. It was first awarded in 2000 at the 13th Kids' Choice Awards, and changed from "Favorite Male Singer" to "Favorite Male Artist" in 2018.

The most awarded male artist in this category is Justin Bieber with 5 wins, followed by Shawn Mendes with 4 wins. Mendes has also won the award 4 consecutive years (2017–2020). The artist who have received the most nominations, as of the 2025 ceremony is Bruno Mars with 10 nominations, followed by Justin Bieber and Justin Timberlake with nine nominations each.

== Winners and nominations ==
Year	Recipient	Nominees
2000	Will Smith	Jordan Knight; Ricky Martin; Tyrese
2001	Lil' Bow Wow	Ricky Martin; Sisqo; Will Smith
2002	Usher	Bow Wow; Aaron Carter; Lil' Romeo
2003	Nelly	Bow Wow; Lil' Romeo; Justin Timberlake
2004	Nelly	Bow Wow; Nick Cannon; Justin Timberlake
2005	Usher	Chingy; LL Cool J; Nelly
2006	Jesse McCartney	Bow Wow; Nelly; Will Smith
2007	Justin Timberlake	Chris Brown; Jesse McCartney; Sean Paul
2008	Chris Brown	Bow Wow; Soulja Boy; Justin Timberlake
2009	Jesse McCartney	Chris Brown; Kid Rock; T-Pain
2010	Jay Z	Sean Kingston; Mario; Ne-Yo
2011	Justin Bieber	Bruno Mars; Usher; Jay Z
2012	Justin Bieber	Toby Keith; Bruno Mars; Usher
2013	Justin Bieber	Bruno Mars; Blake Shelton; Usher
2014	Justin Timberlake	Bruno Mars; Pitbull; Pharrell Williams
2015	Nick Jonas	Bruno Mars; Blake Shelton; Sam Smith; Justin Timberlake; Pharrell Williams
2016	Justin Bieber	Drake; Nick Jonas; Ed Sheeran; Blake Shelton; The Weeknd
2017	Shawn Mendes	Justin Bieber; Drake; Bruno Mars; Justin Timberlake; The Weeknd
2018	Shawn Mendes	Luis Fonsi; DJ Khaled; Kendrick Lamar; Bruno Mars; Ed Sheeran
2019	Shawn Mendes	Luke Bryan; Drake; DJ Khaled; Bruno Mars; Justin Timberlake
2020	Shawn Mendes	Justin Bieber; Post Malone; Marshmello; Lil Nas X; Ed Sheeran
2021	Justin Bieber	Drake; Post Malone; Shawn Mendes; Harry Styles; The Weeknd
2022	Ed Sheeran	Justin Bieber; Drake; Bruno Mars; Shawn Mendes; The Weeknd
2023	Harry Styles	Justin Bieber; Bad Bunny; Drake; Kendrick Lamar; Post Malone; Ed Sheeran; The Weeknd
2024	Post Malone	Bad Bunny; Drake; Ed Sheeran; Justin Timberlake; Travis Scott; Usher; The Weeknd
2025	Bruno Mars	Bad Bunny; Drake; Jelly Roll; Kendrick Lamar; Post Malone; Travis Scott; The Weeknd
2026	Bruno Mars	Benson Boone; Drake; Ed Sheeran; Harry Styles; Justin Bieber; Lil Uzi Vert; Tyler, the Creator

== Most wins ==
5 wins

- Justin Bieber (3 consecutive)

4 wins

- Shawn Mendes (4 consecutive)

2 wins

- Bruno Mars (consecutive)
- Jesse McCartney
- Nelly (consecutive)
- Justin Timberlake
- Usher

== Most nominations ==
11 nominations

- Bruno Mars

10 nominations

- Justin Bieber

9 nominations

- Drake
- Justin Timberlake

7 nominations

- Ed Sheeran

6 nominations

- Usher
- The Weeknd
- Bow Wow

5 nominations

- Post Malone

4 nominations

- Nelly

3 nominations

- Chris Brown
- Bad Bunny
- Kendrick Lamar
- Jesse McCartney
- Blake Shelton
- Will Smith
- Harry Styles

2 nominations

- Ricky Martin
- Lil' Romeo
- Travis Scott
- Pharrell Williams
- Jay Z
