= Trolls Band Together =

2023 film by Walt Dohrn

- Theatrical release poster
- Directed by: Walt Dohrn
- Screenplay by: Elizabeth Tippet
- Based on: Good Luck Trolls by Thomas Dam
- Produced by: Gina Shay
- Starring: Anna Kendrick; Justin Timberlake; Eric André; Kid Cudi; Daveed Diggs; Andrew Rannells; Amy Schumer; Troye Sivan; Kenan Thompson; *NSYNC; Camila Cabello
- Edited by: Nick Fletcher
- Music by: Theodore Shapiro
- Production company: DreamWorks Animation
- Distributed by: Universal Pictures
- Release dates: November 12, 2023 (Los Angeles); November 17, 2023 (United States)
- Running time: 91 minutes
- Country: United States
- Language: English
- Budget: $95 million
- Box office: $209.6 million

Trolls Band Together is a 2023 American animated musical comedy film produced by DreamWorks Animation, based on the Good Luck Trolls dolls from Thomas Dam. It is the sequel to Trolls World Tour (2020), and the third installment in the Trolls franchise. The film was directed by Walt Dohrn and co-directed by Tim Heitz, and written by Elizabeth Tippet. Anna Kendrick, Justin Timberlake, Zooey Deschanel, Christopher Mintz-Plasse, Anderson .Paak, Ron Funches, Kenan Thompson, Icona Pop, Kunal Nayyar and Dohrn reprise their voice roles from the previous films, with newcomers Eric André, Kid Cudi, Daveed Diggs, Troye Sivan, Camila Cabello, Amy Schumer, Andrew Rannells, the other members of *NSYNC, RuPaul and Zosia Mamet joining the ensemble voice cast. The film follows Poppy and Branch as they set out in an attempt to rescue Branch's brother Floyd (Sivan), while also reuniting his estranged brothers after the boyband BroZone was disbanded.

Ideas for a third Trolls film began prior to the release of Trolls World Tour in April 2020, when Timberlake expressed interest in participating during his Apple Music takeover. DreamWorks Animation officially confirmed the third film's development in November 2021. Despite being predominantly CGI animation, with some additional animation by DNEG, the film includes some 2D animation sequences with animation styles inspired by Yellow Submarine (1968) and Fantasia (1940). Theodore Shapiro returned to compose the score for the film.

Trolls Band Together premiered in Los Angeles on November 12, 2023, and was released in the United States by Universal Pictures on November 17. The film received mostly positive reviews from critics and grossed $210 million.

== Plot ==
In a flashback, an infant Branch and his four older brothers John Dory, Spruce, Clay, and Floyd perform as a boyband called BroZone. When they fail to perform the "Perfect Family Harmony", a powerful ability that Trolls can achieve when they are in complete sync, the brothers argue and go their separate ways. Branch is left alone to be raised by his grandmother Rosiepuff.

In the present, leaving off a month after saving music from the Hard Rock Trolls, (Note: As depicted in Trolls World Tour (2020)) Branch and Poppy (a fan of BroZone) attend Bridget and Gristle's wedding in Bergen Town. They are interrupted by John Dory, who reveals that Branch is his brother, and came because Floyd has been captured by Velvet and Veneer, two Mount Rageon teenagers who wish to be pop stars. The siblings have trapped Floyd in a diamond perfume bottle, which they use to extract his essence and improve their singing, although the process could eventually kill him. As the Perfect Family Harmony is the only thing that can destroy diamond, Branch reluctantly agrees to help John Dory find their brothers and rescue Floyd. Along with Poppy and Tiny Diamond, they set out in John Dory's armadillo-like portable van named Rhonda.

They find Spruce at the Vacay Island resort, where he has changed his name to Bruce and started a family. Bruce is reluctant to help, until his wife and kids convince him to do so. The group later finds Clay at an abandoned Bergen miniature golf course, inhabited by a hidden colony of Pop Trolls who do not know that the Bergens are no longer their enemies, having been separated from the other Pop Trolls when they fled the final Trollstice. (Note: As depicted in Trolls (2016)) They also meet the colony's leader, Viva, who reveals herself to be Poppy's long-lost sister. At first, Poppy is delighted, but the visit turns sour when Viva refuses to believe the Bergens have changed, and tries to stop Poppy's group from leaving the golf course. They manage to escape thanks to Clay, who has agreed to help, and Poppy and Viva sadly part ways.

Meanwhile, Velvet and Veneer continue to strip Floyd of his essence, and Velvet reveals that she forged Floyd's handwriting and sent a letter to John Dory, in order to bait Floyd's brothers to come and rescue him. Furthermore, the sibling's assistant Crimp is tricked and ends up inventing shoulder-pad suits that enhance the extraction, which they plan to use when they capture all of BroZone.

The Trolls almost make it to Mount Rageous, but once again argue and fail to perform the Perfect Family Harmony. When his brothers decide they will split up again after saving Floyd, Branch scolds them for still treating him like a baby, revealing to them that he lived his whole life alone after their grandmother got eaten. Branch, Poppy, and Tiny separate from the others and go to rescue Floyd themselves; feeling guilty, the brothers attempt the same thing but are captured by Velvet and Veneer. Meanwhile, Bridget and Gristle eventually stumble into the golf course during their honeymoon; Viva and her Trolls capture them, but learn from them that Poppy was telling the truth about the Bergens. Viva allies with them to go aid Poppy.

Freeing Rhonda, who had also been captured, Branch and Poppy confront Velvet and Veneer when they start mingling with their fans, prompting them to drive away in their luxury vehicle. During the ensuing chase, Velvet and Veneer begin using the shoulder-pads to extract the essence from Branch's brothers in order to put on a show. Viva, Bridget, and Gristle arrive and help to try to rescue the brothers.

Seeing that Floyd is just about out of essence, Branch tells his brothers that they all simply need to be in harmony. They, along with Poppy and Viva, perform the Perfect Family Harmony and break free of their prisons just as Floyd loses the last of his essence; however, he is quickly revived. Veneer, who had been second-guessing Velvet's machinations, publicly confesses everything, and the siblings are sent to prison as Branch and Poppy share their first kiss.

The group returns to Vacay Island, reunite with their friends, and witness BroZone's comeback concert, joined by Kismet, another band Branch was once part of. Poppy and Viva join in as honorary members of Brozone.

== Voice cast ==
- Anna Kendrick as Poppy, Queen of the Pop Trolls and Branch's girlfriend
- Justin Timberlake as Branch, former 'The Baby' titled member of Brozone and the youngest of the brothers
- Kenan Thompson as Tiny Diamond, a baby glitter Hip-Hop Troll and Guy Diamond's son
- Walt Dohrn as:
  - King Peppy: the former king of the Pop Trolls. Poppy and Viva's father
  - Cloud Guy: an anthropomorphic cloud
  - Interdimensional Hustle Traveler
- Anderson .Paak as Prince D., one of the princes of the Funk Trolls and Cooper's younger twin brother
- Ron Funches as Cooper, one of the princes of the Funk Trolls and Prince Darnell's older twin brother
- Kunal Nayyar as Guy Diamond, a glitter Pop Troll and Tiny Diamond's father
- David Fynn as Biggie, a large friendly Pop Troll and the owner of Mr. Dinkles
- Kevin Michael Richardson as Mr. Dinkles, Biggie's pet worm
- Eric André as John Dory, former 'The Leader' titled member of BroZone and the oldest of Branch's brothers
- Daveed Diggs as Spruce, former 'The Heartthrob' titled member of BroZone
- Kid Cudi as Clay, former 'The Fun Boy' titled member of BroZone
- Troye Sivan as Floyd, former 'The Sensitive One' titled member of BroZone.
- Camila Cabello as Viva, Poppy's long-lost older sister and leader of the Putt-Putt Trolls
- Zosia Mamet as Crimp, former assistant to Velvet and Veneer
- Amy Schumer as Velvet, a Mount Rageon and Veneer’s older twin sister
  - Brianna Mazzola as Velvet's singing voice
- Andrew Rannells as Veneer, a Mount Rageon and Velvet's younger twin brother
- Christopher Mintz-Plasse as King Gristle, the king of the Bergens and Bridget's husband
- Zooey Deschanel as Bridget, a former scullery maid, the queen of the Bergens and Gristle's wife
- Icona Pop as Satin and Chenille, twin Pop Trolls that are conjoined by their hair
- RuPaul Charles as Miss Maxine, the officiant for the wedding between King Gristle Jr. and Bridget
- Dillon Francis as Kid Ritz, a DJ from Mount Rageous
- GloZell Green as Grandma Rosiepuff, the grandmother of Branch and his brothers
- Patti Harrison as Brandy, Spruce's wife on Vacay Island
- Lance Bass, JC Chasez, Joey Fatone, and Chris Kirkpatrick as Boom, Hype, Ablaze, and Trickee, the members of Kismet

== Production ==
On April 9, 2020, Justin Timberlake expressed interest in participating in the future Trolls films during his Apple Music takeover, "I hope we make, like, seven Trolls movies, because it literally is the gift that keeps on giving". On November 22, 2021, it was announced that a third Trolls film would be released in theaters on November 17, 2023. Anna Kendrick and Justin Timberlake were confirmed to reprise their voice roles as Poppy and Branch, respectively. On March 28, 2023, with the release of the first official trailer, new cast members of the film were officially announced, including Eric André, Kid Cudi, Daveed Diggs, Troye Sivan, Camila Cabello, Amy Schumer, Andrew Rannells, RuPaul, and Zosia Mamet. Walt Dohrn returned to direct the third film after doing so for its predecessor, while Gina Shay returned to serve as producer. Tim Heitz was later announced as co-director. The same day of these announcements, DreamWorks Animation revealed the official title, Trolls Band Together.

According to Shay, the idea for the film came about right after Trolls (2016). Although Trolls Band Together was predominantly CGI animation, the film includes some 2D animation sequences done by Titmouse, Inc., with animation styles inspired by Yellow Submarine (1968) and Fantasia (1940). Additional animation was done by DNEG.

=== Music ===
On March 6, 2023, Theodore Shapiro was confirmed to compose the score for Trolls Band Together, returning from its predecessor. On September 14, 2023, following the release of the second trailer, DreamWorks announced that NSYNC would perform an original song for the film, called "Better Place" marking the group's first song in 22 years.

== Release ==
=== Marketing ===
==== Merchandise ====
Universal Brand Development appointed Mattel as the global master toy licensee for the Trolls franchise, including said film, replacing Hasbro on March 22, 2022. Universal also collaborated with several brands and product partnerships to promote the film for its marketing campaign, including ShineWater Beverages, ICEE, Shake Shack, Southwest Airlines, Candy, CAMP Store, and Puma, as well as international brands such as Zing Flowers.

A video game based on the film, titled Trolls: Remix Rescue, was released on October 27, 2023, by DreamWorks Animation and Game Mill Entertainment for PlayStation 4, PlayStation 5, Xbox One and Series X & S, Nintendo Switch, and PC. In this game, which takes place after the events of the second film Trolls World Tour, Poppy, Branch, and the player character must embark on a quest to save the Troll Kingdom from Chaz the Smooth Jazz Troll when he tries to take over the place by hypnotizing the residents with his saxophone.

=== Theatrical ===
Trolls Band Together began releasing in international markets, starting with Denmark on October 12, 2023, and made its premiere in Los Angeles on November 12, and was then released in the United States on November 17. After Trolls World Tour (2020) was simultaneously released on video on demand in addition to a limited number of theaters due to the COVID-19 pandemic, this film returned to being released exclusively in theaters.

=== Home media ===
Trolls Band Together was released on VOD on December 19, 2023. The film was released on Blu-ray, DVD, and 4K UHD on January 16, 2024.

It was added to Peacock on March 15, 2024. As part of Universal's 18-month deal with Netflix for its animated films, the film will stream on Peacock for the first four months starting on of the pay-TV window, before moving to Netflix for the next ten starting on July 15, 2024, and returning to Peacock for the remaining four starting on May 15, 2025.

== Reception ==
=== Box office ===
Trolls Band Together grossed $103 million in the United States and Canada, and $106.5 million in other territories, for a worldwide gross of $209.5 million.

In the United States and Canada, Trolls Band Together was released alongside Next Goal Wins, The Hunger Games: The Ballad of Songbirds & Snakes, and Thanksgiving, and was projected to gross $27–32 million from 3,800 theaters in its opening weekend. The film made $9.4 million on its first day, including $1.3 million from Thursday night previews. It went on to debut $30.6 million, finishing second behind The Hunger Games. The film made $17.8 million in its second weekend (a drop of 40.6%), finishing in fourth.

=== Critical response ===
On the review aggregator website Rotten Tomatoes, 64% of 89 critics' reviews are positive, with an average rating of 5.9/10. The website's consensus reads: "Trolls Band Together serves up another amusing, eye-catching outing that should entertain young fans of the franchise while remaining perfectly painless for parents." Metacritic, which uses a weighted average, assigned the film a score of 53 out of 100, based on 13 critics, indicating "mixed or average" reviews. Audiences polled by CinemaScore gave the film an average grade of "A" on an A+ to F scale, same as the first film, while those polled by PostTrak gave it an 85% overall positive score, with 67% saying they would definitely recommend the film.

Frank Scheck of The Hollywood Reporter gave the film a positive review, writing, "Elizabeth Tippet's screenplay garners laughs thanks to the sheer volume of jokes (the hit-to-miss ratio is pretty unbalanced), and there are several amusing one-liners about the music business." Tatiana Hullender of Screen Rant rated the film 2.5 out of 5 score, writing "Trolls Band Together shows clear signs of franchise fatigue, but a few new songs and vivid animation choices keep it afloat a little longer."

=== Accolades ===
Unlike the last two films, Trolls Band Together has gotten the most wins with five with one of them being for its soundtrack at the 2024 Billboard Music Awards for top soundtrack. Also, Anna Kendrick once again wins for Favorite Female Voice from an Animated Movie for this film at the 2024 Kids' Choice Awards. The song Better Place was nominated at the 67th Annual Grammy Awards for best song written for visual media.

Award	Date of ceremony	Category	Recipient(s)	Result	Ref.
Billboard Music Awards	December 12, 2024	Top Soundtrack	Trolls Band Together	Won	
Grammy Awards	February 2, 2025	Best Song Written for Visual Media	"Better Place" – Shellback, Justin Timberlake, and Amy Allen	Nominated	
Hollywood Music in Media Awards	November 15, 2023	Original Song – Animated Film	Better Place – Shellback, Justin Timberlake, and Amy Allen	Won	
Hollywood Music in Media Awards	November 15, 2023	Song – Onscreen Performance (Film)	NSYNC – "Better Place"	Nominated	
Hollywood Music in Media Awards	November 15, 2023	Music Supervision – Film	Angela Leus	Won	
Hollywood Music in Media Awards	November 15, 2023	Music Themed Film or Musical	Trolls Band Together	Won	
Hollywood Music in Media Awards	November 15, 2023	Soundtrack Album	Trolls Band Together	Nominated	
Nickelodeon Kids' Choice Awards	July 13, 2024	Favorite Animated Movie	Trolls Band Together	Nominated	
Nickelodeon Kids' Choice Awards	July 13, 2024	Favorite Female Voice from an Animated Movie	Anna Kendrick	Won	
Nickelodeon Kids' Choice Awards	July 13, 2024	Favorite Male Voice from an Animated Movie	Justin Timberlake	Nominated	
Nickelodeon Kids' Choice Awards	July 13, 2024	Favorite Villain	Amy Schumer	Nominated	
