= Billboard Music Award for Top Soundtrack =

Annual American music award

The Billboard Music Award winners and nominees for Top Soundtrack. Notable winners include the Titanic soundtrack, High School Musical soundtrack, who was the first made for television movie or tv show soundtrack to get nominated and is the only one to have ever won that wasn't in theaters, and Frozen soundtrack, who became the first animated film soundtrack to win. The only person to win and get nominated was Celine Dion for the Titanic soundtrack. In 2017, Hamilton became the first Cast album to win. Also, in 2024, Trolls Band Together became the first non-Disney animated film soundtrack to win.

== Winners and nominees ==
Year	Won album	Artist	Nominations	Ref.
1993	The Bodyguard	Whitney Houston		
1998	Titanic	Celine Dion	Various Artists – City of Angels: Music from the Motion Picture; Various Artists – Armageddon: The Album; Spice Girls – Spiceworld	
2000	Titanic	Celine Dion	—N/a	
2006	High School Musical	High School Musical Cast	Jack Johnson – Sing-A-Longs and Lullabies for the Film Curious George; Various Artists – Walk the Line	
2015	Frozen	Various Artists	Various Artists – The Fault in Our Stars; Various Artists – Fifty Shades of Grey; Various Artists – Guardians of the Galaxy; Various Artists – Into the Woods	
2016	Pitch Perfect 2	Various Artists	Various Artists – Empire: Season 1; Various Artists – Fifty Shades of Grey; Various Artists – Furious 7; Various Artists – Guardians of the Galaxy; Awesome Mix Vol. 1	
2017	Hamilton: An American Musical	Various Artists	Various Artists – Moana; Various Artists – Purple Rain; Various Artists – Suicide Squad; Various Artists – Trolls	
2018	Moana	Various Artists	Various Artists – Black Panther; Various Artists – The Fate of the Furious; Various Artists – The Greatest Showman; Various Artists – Guardians of the Galaxy Vol. 2	
2019	The Greatest Showman	Various Artists	Various Artists – Spider-Man: Into the Spider-Verse; Various Artists – Bohemian Rhapsody; Lady Gaga & Bradley Cooper – A Star Is Born; Various Artists – 13 Reasons Why: Season 2	
2020	Frozen 2	Various Artists	Various Artists - Aladdin; Various Artists - Descendants 3; Melanie Martinez - K-12; Mötley Crüe - The Dirt	
2022	Encanto	Various Artists	Various Artists - Arcane League of Legends; Various Artists - In The Heights; Various Artists - Sing 2; Various Artists - Tick, Tick…BOOM!	
2023	Barbie the Album	Various Artists	Various Artists - Black Panther: Wakanda Forever; Various Artists - Elvis; Metro Boomin - Spider-Man: Across the Spider-Verse; Various Artists - Top Gun: Maverick	
2024	Trolls Band Together	Various Artists	Various Artists - Hazbin Hotel: Season One; Various Artists - Twisters: The Album; Various Artists - Wish; Neil Hannon and Joby Talbot - Wonka	
