= Yelpy =

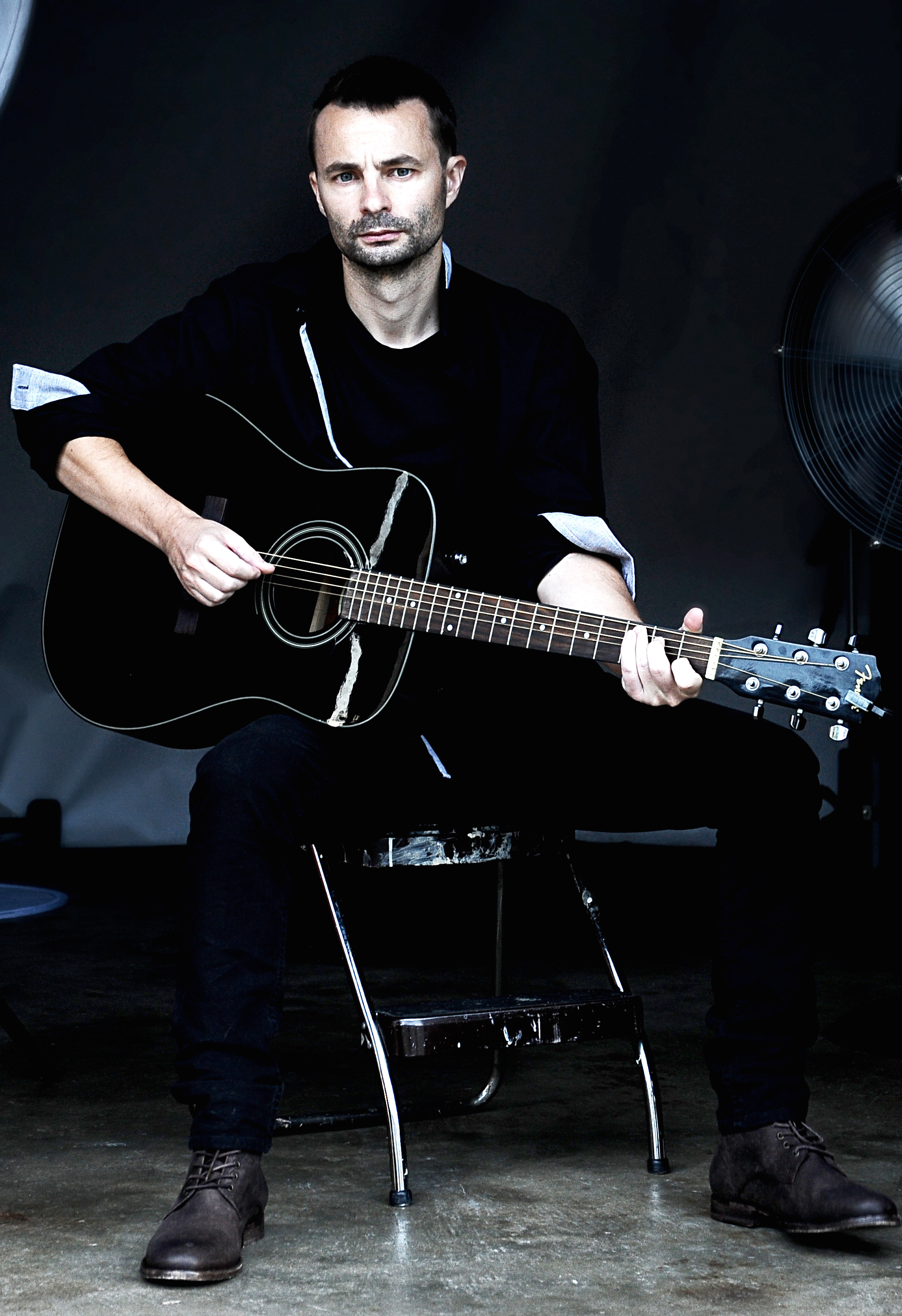
- Yelpy – Photo by: Adam Sheridan Taylor

Background information
- Also known as: Yelpy
- Born: Alan Milligan; Dublin, Ireland
- Website: www.yelpy.net

Alan Milligan (born 23 May 1978), known by his stage name Yelpy, is an Irish singer-songwriter and musician from Dublin. He began his career as the lead singer/guitarist for the band Whover (pronounced Hoover). After Whover he then went on to form the band Yellow Room and released two studio albums. In 2010 he moved to Los Angeles to pursue a solo career as Yelpy. Yelpy will release his debut single "Feel It" on 21 November 2014.

== History ==
Yelpy was born in Dublin city and was raised in a very musical household. He began playing guitar at the age of 15. While attending Ballyfermot College of Further Education, Dublin – the "Rock School" Yelpy formed the band Whover. Whover toured all over Ireland and played on RTÉ and BBC television. Their hit song "Ginger Coloured Yellow Man" was awarded song of the week on Dublin's FM104. Yelpy then formed the band Yellow Room with his two sisters Ruth and Niamh. Yellow Room released two studio albums "Outside" and the self-titled "Yellow Room". They played all over Ireland in such venues as Whelan's (music venue) and The Spirit Store. Today FM featured their hit song "The One".

In 2010 Yelpy moved to Los Angeles to pursue a solo career as a singer/songwriter. He released his debut single "Feel It" on 21 November 2014.

== Media ==
1. Singer-Songwriter: Irish Artist Yelpy Paper Aquarium Magazine, 19 November 2012

2. Yelpy - Making His Mark In Los Angeles Meagan Sarget, Splash Magazine

3. Irish Gig Prodijee Magazine, October–November 2012

4. Irish Singer Songwriter Yelpy Releases New Single "Feel It" Convozine, 4 October 2014
