= Blacktail (video game) =

2022 video game

- Developer: The Parasight
- Publisher: Focus Entertainment
- Platforms: Windows; PlayStation 5; Xbox Series X/S
- Release: 15 December 2022
- Genres: First-person shooter, action-adventure
- Mode: Single-player

Blacktail is a 2022 first-person shooter developed by Polish studio The Parasight and published by Focus Entertainment. It was released for Windows, PlayStation 5, and Xbox Series X/S on 15 December 2022. In the game, players take control of a girl named Yaga, as she attempts to hunt down memories of her past that have come to life as spirits. The game received generally positive reviews on release.

== Gameplay ==
Blacktail is a first-person shooter with elements of action-adventure games. Players control a girl named Yaga (a younger incarnation of Baba Yaga), who was exiled from her village on accusations of witchcraft. Yaga must hunt down memories of her past that have come to life as spirits, while searching for her missing sister. Yaga has no melee weapons, but can shoot using her bow, dash away from enemies, or pull them around using a broom. She can also craft a number of useful potions and different types of ammunition using resources found in the forest, the main level of the game. Aside from completing the main story, players may also participate in a number of side quests that reward Yaga with Lost Pages, items that can be spent to improve her combat abilities. A "morality system" feature, affected by Yaga's inclinations towards good or evil, determines the power of a number of her capabilities, as well as limiting how she can interact with non-player characters (NPCs). Players can alter Yaga's inclination by performing "good" tasks such as saving birds, or "evil" tasks like shooting animals. The state of Yaga's morality system also affects the ending of the game.

== Reception ==
Reception

Aggregate score
Aggregator	Score
Metacritic	PC: 80/100; PS5: 79/100; XSXS: 80/100

Review scores
Publication	Score
Shacknews	8/10
IGN France	9/10
Eurogamer Poland	6/10

According to the review aggregate website Metacritic, Blacktail received "generally favorable reviews". Shacknews enjoyed the story, artstyle, mythology, and archery-based combat, while mentioning that the saving system could be simplified. IGN France rated the game a 9/10, praising the game world and story as "rich". The reviewer also linked the role-playing elements, but found the AI-controlled enemies to be too easy. Eurogamer Poland liked the level designs and "unusual" story and setting, but said that the gameplay could feel repetitive and the PC version had many technical issues.
