= Trolls Band Together (soundtrack) =

2023 soundtrack album

Trolls Band Together: Original Motion Picture Soundtrack is the soundtrack album to the 2023 DreamWorks Animation film Trolls Band Together, the third installment in the Trolls franchise and sequel to Trolls World Tour (2020). It was released by RCA Records, digitally on October 20, 2023, and later through physical formats on November 17, the same day as the film's release. The album was primarily produced by singer-songwriter Justin Timberlake, record producer Mike Elizondo and composer Joseph Shirley. It was promoted with two singles: "Better Place" and "It Takes Two". A separate film score album, Trolls Band Together (Original Motion Picture Score), composed by Theodore Shapiro, was released by Back Lot Music on November 10, 2023, seven days before the film's theatrical release. The song "Better Place" was nominated for a Grammy Award. The soundtrack itself won a Billboard Music Award.

== Trolls Band Together: Original Motion Picture Soundtrack ==
Trolls Band Together: Original Motion Picture Soundtrack

Soundtrack album by Various artists
- Released: October 20, 2023
- Genre: Children's music
- Length: 32:20
- Label: RCA
- Producers: Justin Timberlake; Mike Elizondo; Joseph Shirley; Shellback

Singles from Trolls Band Together: Original Motion Picture Soundtrack
- 1. "Better Place" Released: September 29, 2023; 2. "It Takes Two" Released: October 11, 2023

=== Background ===
Timberlake, also reprising his role as Branch in the sequel, had executive produced the soundtrack as he did with the predecessors. He described to the director Walt Dohrn on how the film should celebrate boy bands as well as making fun slightly. They discussed about including musical numbers of boy bands throughout the decades in an organic manner and make it as a medley which fits in the narrative.

=== Singles ===
Followed by the reunion of NSYNC at the 2023 MTV Video Music Awards, and after the second trailer's release on September 14, 2023, DreamWorks was announced that they would record a song for the film titled "Better Place" that would become the group's first song in 22 years, since their album Celebrity (2001). The song was released on September 29, which coincided the announcement of the soundtrack. The second single "It Takes Two" performed by Camila Cabello and Anna Kendrick released on October 11.

=== Commercial performance ===
Upon its release, "Better Place" debuted at number twenty-five on the Billboard Hot 100, tying the group NSYNC's highest debut on the chart with their debut single, "I Want You Back" and their first since their previous single "Girlfriend" released in 2002. Joey Fatone, in an interview to OK! said that:

"I didn't think it was going to have the magnitude it had. I didn't think about it hitting the charts, which I know sounds stupid. I wasn't even thinking about that! It was like, 'This is for the Trolls Band Together movie. Let's do it for fun,' I wasn't thinking like, 'You're on the charts in Canada, Belgium, Germany' — all these places we haven't been to in years! Why is this even happening? Of course, it's the connection they feel to *NSYNC, to Justin, the movie connection. It just all worked."

=== Accolades ===
The soundtrack won a Billboard Music Award for top soundtrack and was nominated for a Hollywood Music in Media Award for soundtrack album. The song "Better Place" won a Hollywood Music in Media Award for best original song in an animated film and was nominated a Grammy Award for best song written for visual media.

=== Track listing ===
Trolls Band Together: Original Motion Picture Soundtrack track listing
No.	Title	Writer(s)	Producer(s)	Length
1.	"Better Place" (NSYNC)	Timberlake; Karl Schuster; Amy Allen	Timberlake; Shellback	3:37
2.	"Perfect" (Timberlake, Eric André, Daveed Diggs, Kid Cudi and Troye Sivan)	Emily Warren; Timberlake; Michael Pollack; Mike Elizondo	Timberlake; Elizondo	2:32
3.	"Let's Get Married" (Timberlake, Anna Kendrick, Zooey Deschanel, Anderson .Paak, Kenan Thompson, Kunal Nayyar, Icona Pop and Ron Funches)	Bernard Edwards; Eric Frederic; Harry Wayne Casey; Herby Azor; Joseph Shirley; Lionel Richie; Melissa Jefferson; Nile Rodgers; Raymond Davies; Richard Wagner; Rick Finch; Tim Heitz	Shirley	3:09
4.	"Watch Me Work" (Andrew Rannells and Brianna Mazzola)	Warren; Timberlake; Pollack; Elizondo	Timberlake; Elizondo	2:30
5.	"Vacay Island" (Diggs, India Carney and Ty Taylor)	Christopher Cross; King Floyd; Orville Burrell; Rivers Cuomo; Robert Livingston	Shirley	1:41
6.	"BroZone's Back" (Timberlake, André, Diggs and Kendrick)	Barry Gibb; Dag Volle; Dallas Austin; Larry Johnson; Martin Sandberg; Maurice Gibb; Michael Bivins; Michael Jonzun; Nathan Morris; Robin Gibb; Shawn Stockman	Shirley	1:21
7.	"Lonely People" (Sivan)	Catherine Peek; Dan Peek	Shirley	0:38
8.	"Hustle Dimension" (Joseph Shirley)	Andrew Harr; Jermaine Jackson; Van McCoy; William Roberts	Shirley	2:01
9.	"It Takes Two" (Camila Cabello, Kendrick, Timberlake, André, Diggs and Cudi)	Warren; Timberlake; Pollack; Elizondo	Timberlake; Elizondo	3:39
10.	"Mount Rageous" (Rannells and Mazzola)	Dean Pitchford; Michael Gore; Warren; Timberlake; Pollack; Elizondo; Theodore Shapiro	Shirley; Roy Latham	2:57
11.	"Better Place (Family Harmony)" (Timberlake, André, Diggs, Cudi, Sivan, Kendrick and Cabello)	Timberlake; Schuster; Allen	Timberlake; Shellback	1:56
12.	"Better Place (Reunion)" (NSYNC, André, Diggs, Sivan and Cudi)	Timberlake; Schuster; Allen	Timberlake; Shellback	2:15
13.	"Family" (Timberlake, Kendrick, Cabello, André, Diggs, Cudi and Sivan)	Warren; Timberlake; Pollack; Elizondo	Timberlake; Elizondo	3:37
14.	"9 to 5" (Zosia Mamet)	Dolly Parton	Shirley	1:27
Total length:				32:20

Trolls Band Together: Original Motion Picture Soundtrack (Deluxe Edition) track listing
No.	Title	Writer(s)	Producer(s)	Length
15.	"Better Place (Tiësto Remix)" (NSYNC, Tiësto)	Timberlake; Schuster; Allen	Timberlake; Shellback; Tiësto	3:02
16.	"Family (Demo)" (Timberlake, Warren)	Warren; Timberlake; Pollack; Elizondo	Timberlake; Elizondo	2:10
Total length:				37:32

=== Personnel ===
All credits are adapted from CD liner notes.

Musicians

- Shellback – guitar (track 1), bass (track 1), drums (track 1), keyboards (track 1), percussion (track 1), programming (track 1), whistle (track 1)
- Justin Timberlake – beatbox (track 1), background vocals (track 5)
- Robert Mollard – tambourine (track 1)
- Kaspar Komar – tambourine (track 1)
- Mike Elizondo – electric guitar (tracks 2, 4, 9, 13), bass (tracks 9, 13), drum programming (tracks 2, 4, 9, 13), keyboards (tracks 2, 4, 9, 13), background vocals (track 13)
- Joseph Shirley – guitar (tracks 3, 5, 6, 8, 10, 11, 14), drum programming (tracks 3, 5, 6, 8, 10, 11, 14), keyboards (tracks 3, 5–8, 10, 11, 14), synthesizers (tracks 3, 5–8, 10, 11, 14), background vocals (tracks 3, 5, 6, 10, 11, 14)
- Christopher Hartz – drums (tracks 3, 5, 6, 8), percussion (tracks 3, 5, 6, 8)
- Nick Paul – keyboards (tracks 3, 5, 6, 8), synthesizers (tracks 3, 5, 6, 8)
- Sam Sugarman – guitar (tracks 3, 5, 6, 8)
- Mike Cordone – trumpet (tracks 3, 5, 6, 8)
- Jesse McGinty – alto saxophone (tracks 3, 5, 6, 8)
- David Moyer – tenor saxophone (tracks 3, 5, 6, 8)
- Prateek Rajagopal – guitar (tracks 5, 8, 14), keyboards (tracks 5, 8, 14), synthesizers (tracks 5, 8), drum programming (tracks 5, 8), ukulele (track 7)
- Emily Warren – background vocals (tracks 9, 13)
- Brianna Mazzola – background vocals (tracks 9, 13)
- Fred Eltringham – drums (tracks 9, 13)
- Javier Solis – percussion (tracks 9, 13)
- Matthew Cohen – guitar (track 10), synthesizers (track 10)
- Michael Pollack – background vocals (track 13)
- Philip Towns – piano (track 13)
- Roy Agee – trombone (track 13)
- Evan Cobb – saxophone (track 13)
- Emmanuel Echem – trumpet (track 13)

Technical

- Chris Godbey – recording engineer (tracks 1–4, 6, 9, 11–13), additional mixer (tracks 3, 5, 6, 11)
- Serban Ghenea – mixer (tracks 1, 12)
- Mike Elizondo – recording engineer (tracks 2, 4, 9, 13)
- Erica Block – recording engineer (tracks 2, 4, 9, 13)
- Justin Francis – recording engineer (tracks 2, 4, 9, 13)
- Alex Wilder – recording engineer (tracks 2, 4, 9, 13)
- Kenneth Gombos – recording engineer (tracks 2–4, 6, 9–14)
- Carlos Sotolongo – recording engineer (tracks 2, 5, 9, 13)
- Phil Threlfall – recording engineer (tracks 2, 7, 13)
- Adam Hawkins – mixer (tracks 2, 4, 9, 13)
- Riley Mackin – recording engineer (tracks 3, 5–8, 10–12, 14), mixer (tracks 3, 5–8, 11, 14), additional mixer (track 12)
- Roy Latham – recording engineer (tracks 3, 10)
- Robin Rönnbäck – recording engineer (track 3)
- Tighe Sheldon – recording engineer (track 3)
- John Armstrong – additional recording engineer (tracks 3, 5, 8), assistant recording engineer (tracks 6, 7, 9–14)
- John Witt Chapman – additional mixer (track 3), recording engineer (track 10), mixer (track 10)
- Joseph Shirley – recording engineer (tracks 6, 8, 9, 11, 12)
- Matt Smalley – recording engineer (tracks 6, 11, 12)
- Chris Whiteside – recording engineer (track 6)
- Bart Schroudel – recording engineer (tracks 9, 11, 13)
- Bryce Roberts – recording engineer (tracks 10, 11)
- Randy Merrill – mastering engineer

=== Charts ===
==== Weekly charts ====
Weekly chart performance for Trolls Band Together: Original Motion Picture Soundtrack
Chart (2023–2024)	Peak position
Australian Albums (ARIA)	48
Canadian Albums (Billboard)	73
New Zealand Albums (RMNZ)	17
UK Compilation Albums (Official Charts)	8
UK Soundtrack Albums (Official Charts)	3
US Billboard 200	43
US Soundtrack Albums (Billboard)	2

==== Year-end charts ====
Year-end chart performance for Trolls Band Together: Original Motion Picture Soundtrack
Chart (2024)	Position
US Soundtrack Albums (Billboard)	3

=== Release history ===
Release dates and formats for Trolls Band Together: Original Motion Picture Soundtrack
Region	Date	Format(s)	Label	Ref.
Various	October 20, 2023	Digital download; streaming	RCA	
Various	November 17, 2023	CD; vinyl	RCA	

== Trolls Band Together (Original Motion Picture Score) ==
=== Background ===
On March 6, 2023, Theodore Shapiro was confirmed to compose the score for Trolls Band Together, returning from its predecessor.

=== Track listing ===
All tracks are written by Theodore Shapiro.

No.	Title	Length
1.	"Wedding Ceremony"	3:12
2.	"Brozone Breaks Up"	2:34
3.	"Be Real with Me"	0:55
4.	"Trapped in a Diamond Bottle"	1:19
5.	"Floyd Is in Danger"	1:20
6.	"Here We Bro Again"	2:00
7.	"Velvet and Veneer's Plan"	2:00
8.	"Operation Family Harmony"	1:53
9.	"Bridget and Gristle Ride"	2:25
10.	"Clue Board"	1:03
11.	"Meet Viva"	3:01
12.	"Meet Clay"	1:07
13.	"¡Mi Hermana!"	1:37
14.	"Bergin War Story"	2:15
15.	"Escape from Putt Putt Village"	2:33
16.	"Knock Knock Knock!"	2:16
17.	"Showtime"	2:02
18.	"Perfect Family Harmony Fail"	3:28
19.	"French Fries"	1:12
20.	"Infiltration"	3:16
21.	"Systematic Desensitization"	1:50
22.	"Phonies!"	0:46
23.	"Encore"	1:02
24.	"Things Come Together"	2:35
Total length:		47:54
