= Better Place (NSYNC song) =

Single by NSYNC

from the album Trolls Band Together (Original Motion Picture Soundtrack)
- Released: September 29, 2023
- Recorded: March 2023
- Genre: Pop
- Length: 3:37
- Label: RCA
- Songwriters: Justin Timberlake; Shellback; Amy Allen
- Producers: Timberlake; Shellback

NSYNC singles chronology
"Girlfriend" (2002)	"Better Place" (2023)

Lyric video
- "Better Place" on YouTube

"Better Place" is a song by American boy band NSYNC. It was released on September 29, 2023, through RCA as the lead single from the soundtrack of the film Trolls Band Together, in which band member Justin Timberlake voices the character Branch. He produced the song with Shellback and the two wrote it alongside Amy Allen. It serves as NSYNC's first release after a hiatus that lasted over twenty years and follows the release of their fourth studio album, Celebrity (2001).

The song received several accolades, including a Hollywood Music in Media Award for best original song in an animated film, and was nominated for Best Song Written for Visual Media at the 66th Annual Grammy Awards.

== Release and promotion ==
Over two weeks before the release of the song, the band members put out a behind-the-scenes video, in which it showed the members recording their parts for the song. A trailer video was also released, which included a pre-save link for the song and confirmed its release date. Rumors of an NSYNC reunion have previously circulated after numerous posters of the film Trolls Band Together were spotted in New York City, which included the first letter of the band's logo and a QR code to the website TakeYouToABetterPlace.com to give a teaser of the song. The band briefly reunited at the 2023 MTV Video Music Awards on September 12, prior to the song's release on September 29, 2023. However, the song and film were reportedly not promoted by the band due to the 2023 Hollywood labor disputes.

== Composition and lyrics ==
"Better Place" is a pop song that is reminiscent of NSYNC's previous music from the late 1990s and early 2000s and is built on a disco pop instrumental as Timberlake, Chasez, Fatone, Kirkpatrick, and Bass sing the chorus: "Just let me take you to a better place / I'm gonna make you kiss the sky tonight / Yeah, if you let me show the way / I'm so excited to see you excited". Timberlake first recorded a demo of the song in early 2023 before deciding to reunite the band and record it together, with the film's plot being considered a "perfect confluence" to carry that narrative.

== Commercial performance ==
"Better Place" debuted and peaked at number twenty-five on the Billboard Hot 100, tying the group's highest debut on the chart with their debut single, "I Want You Back". It became their thirteenth Hot 100 entry, eleventh top 40 appearance, and first since their previous single "Girlfriend" released in 2002.

== Critical reception ==
The single was positively reviewed by Sadie Bell of People, stating it as an "infectious pop banger — calling back the '90s and ‘00s icons' early boy band sound, while giving it a contemporary update with a disco-pop beat. Each member gets their own moment to shine, too, while Timberlake, 42, carries the chorus."

== Music video ==
A lyric video featuring characters from the Trolls Band Together movie was released on YouTube. A fan documentary was then also shared on YouTube highlighting five of the group's biggest fans to star in the music video for "Better Place". It showcased the fans standing in for the band members and becoming *NSYNC as they perform choreography from the movie. The lyric video has received over 10 million views on YouTube as of April 2024.

== Credits and personnel ==
- NSYNC
  - Justin Timberlake – vocals, songwriting, production, beatboxing
  - Chris Kirkpatrick – vocals
  - JC Chasez – vocals
  - Lance Bass – vocals
  - Joey Fatone – vocals
- Shellback – production, songwriting, guitar, bass, percussion, keyboards, drum machine, whistling, programming
- Amy Allen – songwriting
- Anna Bylund – flute
- Teresia Alm – oboe
- Wojtek Goral – baritone saxophone
- Tomas Jonsson – tenor saxophone
- Mattias Johansson – trumpet, French horn, violin
- Helena Stjernstrom – English horn
- Peter Noos Johansson – trombone
- Janne Bjerger – fluegelhorn
- David Bukovinsky – cello
- David Bergström – violin
- Hanna Helgegren – violin
- Erik Arvinder – violin
- Robert Mollard – tambourine
- Kasper Komar – tambourine
- Mattias Bylund – synthesizer, editing, recording
- Karl Gunér – synthesizer
- Serban Ghenea – mixing
- Randy Merrill – mastering
- Chris Godbey – recording
- Bryce Bordone – assistant engineering
- Eric Eylands – assistant engineering

== Charts ==
=== Weekly charts ===
Weekly chart performance for "Better Place"
Chart (2023–24)	Peak position
Australia Digital Tracks (ARIA)	24
Australia Airplay (ARIA)	18
Belgium (Ultratop 50 Flanders)	19
Belgium (Ultratop 50 Wallonia)	42
Canada Hot 100 (Billboard)	43
Canada AC (Billboard)	10
Canada CHR/Top 40 (Billboard)	18
Canada Hot AC (Billboard)	8
CIS Airplay (TopHit)	111
Czech Republic Airplay (ČNS IFPI)	53
Estonia Airplay (TopHit)	199
Germany Download (GfK)	18
Global 200 (Billboard)	128
Hungary (Editors' Choice Top 40)	35
Iceland (Tónlistinn)	17
Japan Hot Overseas (Billboard)	4
Kazakhstan Airplay (TopHit)	218
Latvia Airplay (LAIPA)	9
Lithuania Airplay (TopHit)	56
Netherlands (Dutch Top 40 Tipparade)	24
New Zealand Hot Singles (RMNZ)	27
Poland (Polish Airplay Top 100)	18
San Marino (SMRRTV Top 50)	23
Slovakia Airplay (ČNS IFPI)	59
Sweden Heatseeker (Sverigetopplistan)	5
UK Singles Downloads (Official Charts)	21
UK Singles Sales (OCC)	24
US Billboard Hot 100	25
US Adult Contemporary (Billboard)	10
US Adult Pop Airplay (Billboard)	9
US Dance Airplay (Billboard)	24
US Pop Airplay (Billboard)	16

=== Monthly charts ===
Monthly chart performance for "Better Place"
Chart (2024)	Peak position
Lithuania Airplay (TopHit)	74

=== Year-end charts ===
Year-end chart performance for "Better Place"
Chart (2024)	Position
Iceland (Tónlistinn)	85
US Adult Contemporary (Billboard)	24

== Certifications ==
Certifications for "Better Place"
Region	Certification	Certified units/sales
Canada (Music Canada)	Platinum	80,000^{‡}
United States (RIAA)	Platinum	1,000,000^{‡}
^{‡} Sales+streaming figures based on certification alone.

== Release history ==
Release dates and formats for "Better Place"
Region	Date	Format	Label	Ref.
Various	September 29, 2023	Digital download; streaming	RCA	
United States	October 3, 2023	Contemporary hit radio	RCA	
Italy	October 6, 2023	Radio airplay	Sony	
United States	November 17, 2023	7-inch single	Sony	
