= The Lego Movie 2: The Second Part (soundtrack) =

2019 soundtrack albums

The Lego Movie 2: The Second Part (Original Motion Picture Soundtrack)

Soundtrack album by Various artists
- Released: February 7, 2019
- Recorded: 2018–2019
- Genre: Film soundtrack
- Length: 23:51
- Label: WaterTower Music

The Lego Movie 2: The Second Part (Original Motion Picture Score)

Film score by Mark Mothersbaugh
- Released: February 7, 2019
- Recorded: 2018–2019
- Studio: Warner Bros. Eastwood Scoring Stage
- Genre: Film score
- Length: 51:56
- Label: WaterTower Music

Mark Mothersbaugh chronology
Holmes & Watson (2018)	The Lego Movie 2: The Second Part (2019)	The Willoughbys (2020)

The Lego Movie 2: The Second Part (Original Motion Picture Soundtrack) is the soundtrack to the 2019 film of the same name, which is the sequel to the 2014 film The Lego Movie, the fourth instalment overall in the franchise and the last film in the franchise to be produced and distributed by Warner Bros. Pictures. and Warner Animation Group. The album featured 10 songs performed by various artists, including a few tracks performed by the cast members. The songs were written by Shawn Patterson, Christopher Miller and Jon Lajoie, along with prominent songwriters.

Two songs – "Catchy Song" performed by Dillon Francis, T-Pain and Alaya High a.k.a. That Girl Lay Lay, and "Super Cool" by Beck, Robyn and The Lonely Island were released as singles, and the album was released on February 7, 2019. The Lego Movie 2: The Second Part (Original Motion Picture Score), featured original score composed by Mark Mothersbaugh, who scored for the predecessor and was released on the same day, along with its soundtrack. Both the albums were distributed by WaterTower Music.

== Development ==
After the success of "Everything Is Awesome" created for the first film, Phil Lord and Christopher Miller wanted a similar song for the sequel. The duo asked songwriter Jon Lajoie (the primary artist) to write a track that would elicit mixed feelings. According to Lajoie, he described the track as "49 percent annoying and 51 percent fun to listen to” which eventually became "Catchy Song". The track principally featured as its only lyric the repeated phrase "This song's gonna get stuck inside your head", after Lajoie initially sang the phrase in his bathroom while brainstorming about the song lyrics. He initially wrote an annoying version of the track, as he wanted it as "a song that is supposed to drive insane, something that sort of feels creepy and brainwashy" but after watching the film, he changed it to a more enjoyable version of the track.

"Catchy Song" was recorded with several artists and Lajoie wrote 20 different verses of the song, but the producers were not satisfied with the demos. Later, music producer Dillon Francis, whom Lajoie closely associated with, had agreed to perform the track. In addition, T-Pain and Alaya High, under her stage name That Girl Lay Lay, had crooned the version's choral portions. Because director Mike Mitchell and Lajoie initially intended the song would attain popularity among kids, and felt that the repeated verses might irritate parents, they comically apologized to parents after the song's release. Lajoie found that "Everything is Awesome" was "annoyingly catchy", and the only way that they could outdo that was "Dial the 'annoying' up to 11!".

Lajoie initially had planned to include a track called "All Is Amazing" which he had recorded earlier, but could not use it in the album. He found the track too similar to "Everything Is Awesome" except for minor tweaks to the lyrics and melody . While he initially found the song "funny" in parts, he felt it was "not as funny" being heard in full, which prompted him to omit the track from the album. Another song he planned to write, but later omitted, was "It's Hard to Follow Up a Hit Song". The Tween Dream remixed version of "Everything Is Awesome" (from the first film) was featured in the soundtrack with Eban Schletter performing the track with Garfunkel and Oates. A parodic reprise of the track titled "Everything's Not Awesome" is performed by the film's cast and featured additional lyrics by Shawn Patterson and Lajoie.

== Track listing ==
The Lego Movie 2: The Second Part (Original Motion Picture Soundtrack)
No.	Title	Writer(s)	Performer(s)	Length
1.	"Everything Is Awesome (Tween Dream Remix)"	Shawn Patterson; Riki Lindhome; Kate Micucci	Garfunkel and Oates; Eban Schletter	1:53
2.	"5:15"	Christopher Miller; Eldad Geutta	Stephanie Beatriz	0:34
3.	"Welcome to the Systar System"	Jon Lajoie	Yossi Guetta; Esther Guetta; Fiora Cutler	0:38
4.	"Not Evil"	Lajoie	Tiffany Haddish	3:33
5.	"Catchy Song"	Lajoie; Alaya High	Dillon Francis; T-Pain; High	2:48
6.	"Gotham City Guys (Note: Features Batman (1989) theme composed by Danny Elfman.)"	Lajoie	Haddish; Will Arnett	2:16
7.	"Everything's Not Awesome"	Patterson; Lajoie	Beatriz; Ben Schwartz; Alison Brie; Noel Fielding; Charlie Day; Nick Offerman; Will Arnett; Elizabeth Banks; Chris Pratt; Richard Ayoade	3:01
8.	"Super Cool"	Beck Hansen; Andy Samberg; Akiva Schaffer; Jorma Taccone	Beck; Robyn; The Lonely Island	3:23
9.	"Come Together Now"	Matt Johnson; Kim Schiffino	Johnson; Schiffino	2:13
10.	"Hello Me and You"	Superorganism	Superorganism	3:32
Total length:				23:51

The Lego Movie 2: The Second Part (Original Motion Picture Score)
No.	Title	Length
1.	"Your Sister"	0:51
2.	"Main Title (The LEGO Movie 2: The Second Part)"	1:25
3.	"Apocalypseburg / Green Hornet"	1:02
4.	"Apocalypseburg"	0:58
5.	"House Tour"	1:43
6.	"A Shooting Star"	0:45
7.	"Run"	2:39
8.	"Door Slowly Closing"	1:21
9.	"General Mayhem"	1:37
10.	"Triple Decker Couch"	0:59
11.	"No Real Heroes Left"	2:30
12.	"I'll Show Them"	0:58
13.	"The Systar System"	1:01
14.	"Introducing Queen Watevra Wa'Nabi"	1:33
15.	"Did You Say Wedding?"	1:06
16.	"Emmet Saved by Rex / Circular Stairway"	1:15
17.	"Rexcelsior Tour / Crank the Warp Drive"	3:45
18.	"Heading to Planet Sparkles"	1:02
19.	"Emmet and Rex"	1:01
20.	"Alien Jungle"	1:57
21.	"Heck Town"	1:53
22.	"Duplo Brickyard"	1:04
23.	"The Man of Bats Welcome"	0:40
24.	"Fresh Nightmare"	1:49
25.	"Queen Watevra Wa'Nabi & Batman Falling in Love"	1:10
26.	"Lucy Fights Mayhem"	1:31
27.	"Introducing the Wedding Party"	1:01
28.	"Emmet the Hero"	0:48
29.	"The Fight Continues"	3:08
30.	"What Did I Just Do?"	2:43
31.	"There I Was"	1:51
32.	"You're Weak / Brother Gives Heart"	2:35
33.	"Rex Vanishes"	2:15
Total length:		51:56

== Reception ==
Critical response to the film's soundtrack was positive, with Brick Fanatics writing that "the film has an original soundtrack that is a pleasant surprise, definitely worthy of sitting alongside the best animated soundtracks that other, more established animation studios have to offer." The score, however received mixed response. Zanobard reviews gave 3/10 to the score stating that "the score is all over the place. Due to its complete and utter lack of any thematic material, it has no real cohesive narrative and so ends up being just a loose and at points bizarre mess of different musical genres. The music constantly jumps from one area to another, usually spanning several massively different areas of music just in one track. Not only does this make the score very confusing to try and follow, but it also ends up being a particularly unenjoyable album experience as well. The music frequently starts and stops and speeds up and slows down and changes instruments and shifts styles – and after a while you just don't want to listen to it anymore. It's too much like hard work."

Filmtracks.com criticised Mothersbaugh's score and stated "A few new ideas from Mothersbaugh for The Lego Movie 2 do begin to emerge in the final ten minutes, but the score by then has exhausted you with nonsensically unique personality in each of its haphazard orchestral and synthetic romps [...] The layers of post-production electronics aren't terrible, but they serve little purpose when paired with the aimless orchestral recordings. Ultimately, the loss of the themes from the first film's score and the lack of clear interpolation of this film's song melodies into the score are disqualifying alone. Add to that an indecisive and meandering new narrative in the score and you get a very disappointing score-only product on album."

== Chart performance ==
Chart (2019)	Peak position
UK Compilation Albums (OCC)	74
UK Soundtrack Albums (OCC)	12
US Billboard 200	25
US Top Soundtracks (Billboard)	3
