= Superorganism (disambiguation) =

A superorganism is a group of synergetically interacting organisms of the same species.

Superorganism may also refer to:

- Superorganism (band), English indie pop band.
  - Superorganism (Superorganism album), the band's self-titled debut album, 2018
- Superorganism (Mickey Hart Band album), 2013

== See also ==
- Largest organisms
