= That Girl Lay Lay =

That Girl Lay Lay may refer to:

- That Girl Lay Lay (TV series), an American comedy
- Alaya High, known professionally as That Girl Lay Lay, an American singer, rapper and actress
