= Dylan Cartlidge =

English rapper and multi-instrumentalist

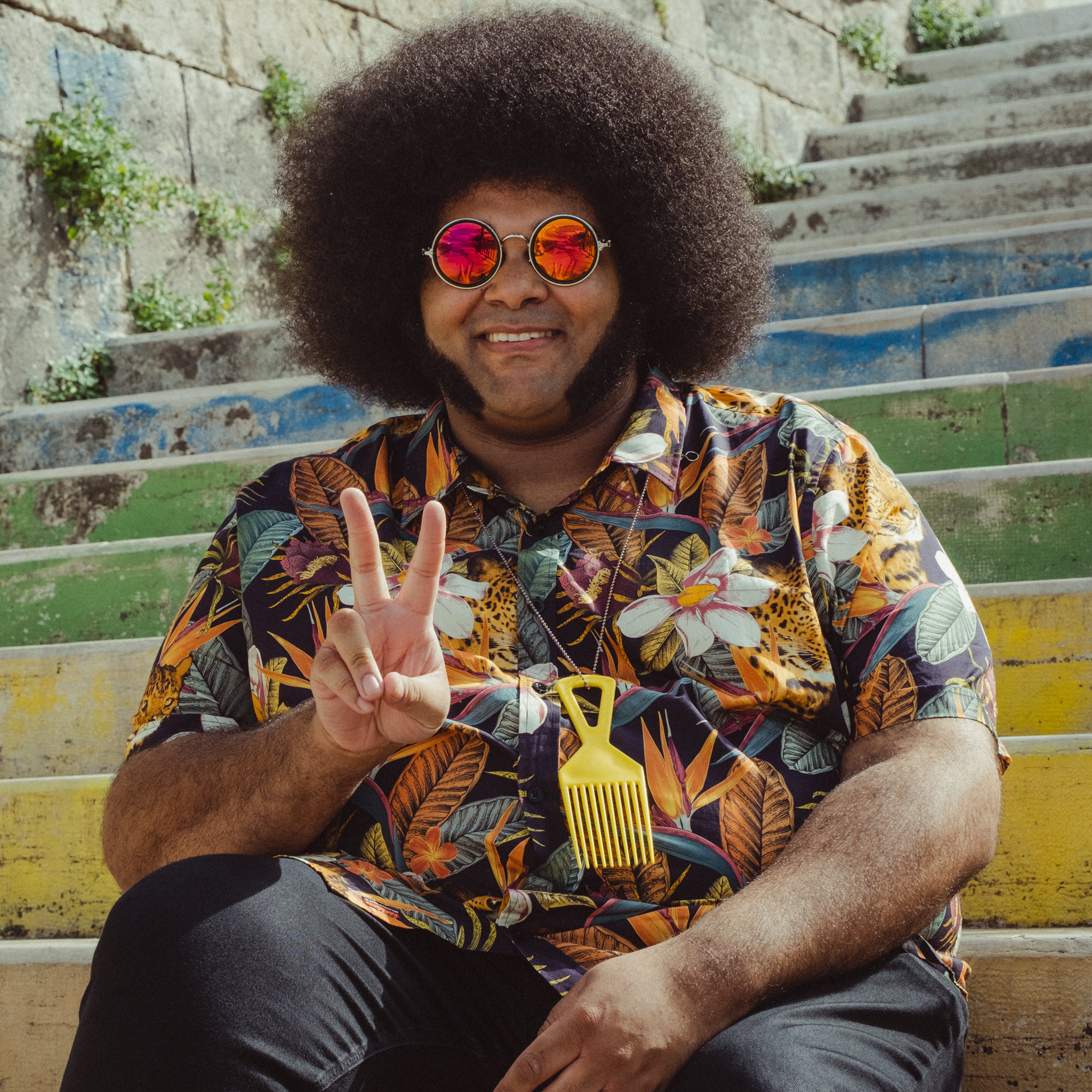

Background information
- Born: Dylan Michael Cartlidge; September 27, 1994 (age 32); Stoke-on-Trent, Staffordshire, United Kingdom
- Genres: Hip hop; funk; pop
- Years active: 2017–present
- Label: Glassnote
- Website: https://dylancartlidge.com

Dylan Cartlidge is a rapper and multi-instrumentalist. His music incorporates elements of funk, soul, hip hop, gospel rock, and R&B. He is known for his hopeful narratives. He was featured in the first episode of BBC documentary The Mighty Redcar, where he was seeking a record deal. He signed to Glassnote Records in 2018.

Cartlidge was named to NPR World Cafe's '30 Under 30', following his on air appearance in 2021. He has also appeared at Glastonbury Festival, SXSW, The Great Escape, and BBC Radio 1's Big Weekend at Middlesbrough.

In April 2023, Cartlidge appeared as a guest contestant on the Beta Squad's "Guess the Musician." The panel attempting to identify the professional musician included rapper Dave. Cartlidge was incorrectly voted out by the panel early despite being compared to Jimi Hendrix.

In December 2023, Cartlidge married Dr. Holly Shahverdi, who frequently accompanies him on tour and sings with him.

== Discography ==
=== Album ===
- Hope Above Adversity (2021)

=== EPs ===
- Yellow Brick Road (2020)
- Monsters Under the Bed (2019)

=== Singles ===
- "Crazy World" (2026)
- "The Greatness" (2025)
- "Show Up" (2025)
- "New Day" (2024)
- "Anything Could Happen" (2021), featured as "top tune" on KCRW.
- "Hang My Head" (2021)
- "Dare to Dream" (2021), which was included on James Gunn's most-listened-to tracks of 2021.
- "Yellow Brick Road" (2021)
- "Higher" (2019)
- "Love Spoons" (2017)

=== Other appearances ===
- "Because" on Cheat Codes by Danger Mouse and Black Thought (2022)
- "It's Raining" on World Wide Pop by Superorganism (2022)
