= I Kill People =

Studio album by Jon Lajoie
- Released: November 15, 2010
- Recorded: 2009–2010
- Genre: Comedy hip-hop, comedy rock
- Length: 47:03
- Label: Normal Guy Productions

Jon Lajoie chronology
You Want Some of This? (2009)	I Kill People (2010)	I Remembered, But Then I Forgot 2016

I Kill People is the second album by Canadian comedy musician Jon Lajoie.

== Track listing ==
No.	Title	Length
1.	"I Kill People"	4:58
2.	"Listening to My Penis"	3:41
3.	"WTF Collective"	4:32
4.	"The Birthday Song"	2:11
5.	"Michael Jackson Is Dead"	2:55
6.	"Alone in the Universe"	3:59
7.	"I Can Dance"	3:26
8.	"Slightly Irresponsible"	3:12
9.	"Nine to Five"	2:28
10.	"Chatroulette Song"	1:36
11.	"In Different Ways"	3:15
12.	"Mel Gibson's Love Song"	3:04
13.	"WTF Collective 2"	4:01
14.	"Radio Friendly Song"	3:45

== Videos ==
Many of the tracks from this album have been released on YouTube as videos.

== Chart positions ==
Chart (2011)	Peak position
US Top Comedy Albums (Billboard)	3
