= Catchy Song =

Theme song from "The Lego Movie 2"

Single by Dillon Francis featuring T-Pain and That Girl Lay Lay

from the album The Lego Movie 2: The Second Part (Original Motion Picture Soundtrack)
- Released: January 18, 2019
- Genre: Synth-pop
- Length: 2:48
- Label: WaterTower
- Songwriter: Jon Lajoie
- Producer: Dillon Francis

"Catchy Song" is a song by American DJ and producer Dillon Francis, featuring guest vocals from rappers T-Pain and That Girl Lay Lay. The song became the main theme to the 2019 Warner Bros. Pictures film The Lego Movie 2: The Second Part, as it is written by Jon Lajoie, and produced by Francis.

The song is notable for its repeated lyric, "This song's gonna get stuck inside your... (×3) ...head!". As the name implies, it is intended to be infectiously catchy, an idea joked about in the movie.

== Production ==
Following the same attempt to create a remix of a song with "BBE" from the album Vera Baddie, the producers of the film created the similar song for the sequel, which principally features the repeated phrase "This song's gonna get stuck inside your head!" for most of the song. According to Lajoie, he found that "Everything Is Awesome" was "annoyingly catchy", and the only way that they could outdo that was "Dial the 'annoying' Beatmaking!". T-Pain sang the song's chorus, while That Girl Lay Lay primarily sang the two verses and the first part of the final chorus.

== Use in film ==
The first use of the song in The Lego Movie 2: The Second Part is in a scene in which most of the film's characters are subjected to the song and all except Lucy dance to it, while simultaneously the denizens of Harmony Town sing it to Emmet and Rex. Lucy/Wildstyle avoids being "brainwashed" by the song by breaking one of the speakers and using some of its pieces to build earmuffs for herself before escaping via air ducts, while Emmet and Rex escape in a similar fashion.

The song is briefly sampled in the unhappy reprise of "Everything Is Awesome" ("Everything's Not Awesome") when Lucy proclaims that the song is "gonna get stuck inside your heart", a proclamation made to bring back the hope of defeating Rex and restoring harmony.

The song also plays in its entirety during the first third of the end crawl during the closing credits.

== Charts ==
=== Weekly charts ===
Chart (2019)	Peak position
US Hot Dance/Electronic Songs (Billboard)	19
US Kid Digital Songs (Billboard)	1
US Rap Digital Songs (Billboard)	13

=== Year-end charts ===
Chart (2019)	Position
US Hot Dance/Electronic Songs (Billboard)	76
