= You Want Some of This? =

Studio album by Jon Lajoie
- Released: January 30, 2009
- Recorded: 2007–2008
- Genres: Comedy hip-hop, comedy rock
- Length: 43:25
- Label: Normal Guy Productions

Jon Lajoie chronology
You Want Some of This? (2009)	I Kill People (2010)

You Want Some of This? is the debut album by Canadian comedy musician and Internet celebrity Jon Lajoie. It was released on January 30, 2009 and features all of his songs from his YouTube sketches up until that date with additional new tracks.

== Songs ==
The song "Show Me Your Genitals 2: E=MC Vagina" is sampled in rapper Royce da 5'9"'s song "Vagina" from The Bar Exam 3: The Most Interesting Man. Many of the lyrics emanate humility, and although intended for comedic effect, some of the lyrics discuss intimate topics and thus may hit close to home.

== Track listing ==
All tracks are written by Jon Lajoie

No.	Title	Length
1.	"Everyday Normal Guy"	3:21
2.	"Too Fast"	1:56
3.	"I Don't Understand"	0:24
4.	"Show Me Your Genitals"	2:32
5.	"High as Fuck"	2:54
6.	"Pop Song"	2:44
7.	"Song for Britney"	2:29
8.	"The Phonecall"	3:51
9.	"Everyday Normal Guy 2"	3:15
10.	"Sunday Afternoon"	2:59
11.	"Stay at Home Dad"	2:59
12.	"Potty Training Song"	0:34
13.	"Show Me Your Genitals 2: E=MC Vagina"	2:56
14.	"Cold Blooded Christmas"	2:14
15.	"2 Girls 1 Cup Song"	2:43
16.	"Everyday Normal Crew"	4:52
17.	"Why Did You Leave Me?"	0:38

== Personnel ==
- Jon Lajoie: Vocals, Acoustic Guitar, Electric Guitar, Bass, Synthesizer, Keyboards, Programming, Percussion
- Nino Perrone: Speaker ("The Phonecall")

== Chart positions ==
Chart (2009)	Peak position
US Top Comedy Albums (Billboard)	11
