= World Wide Pop =

Studio album by Superorganism
- Released: 15 July 2022
- Genre: Indie pop
- Length: 40:19
- Label: Domino
- Producer: John Hill; Stuart Price; Superorganism

Superorganism chronology
Superorganism (2018)	World Wide Pop (2022)	World Wide Pop – Reeeemix! (2022)

Singles from World Wide Pop
- 1. "Teenager" Released: 7 March 2022; 2. "It's Raining" Released: 31 March 2022; 3. "Crushed.zip" Released: 27 April 2022; 4. "On & On" Released: 25 May 2022; 5. "Into the Sun" Released: 28 June 2022

World Wide Pop is the second album by London-based indie pop band Superorganism, released on 15 July 2022 by Domino Recording Company. The album features guest appearances from musicians Chai, Pi Ja Ma, Stephen Malkmus, Dylan Cartlidge, Boa Constrictors, and Gen Hoshino. The album is the group's first since the exit of members Ruby, Robert Strange, and Emily (real name Mark Turner), the latter of whom was caught in controversy in 2019 after filing restraining orders against two women who spoke out against him. The album was followed by an EP of remixes by artists including Lewis OfMan, DJ Sabrina the Teenage DJ, and the band themselves, released by Domino 28 October 2022.

== Singles ==
Lead single "Teenager" was released alongside the album's announcement on 7 March 2022, with an accompanying music video starring actor Brian Jordan Alvarez. Subsequent singles, all with their own music videos as well, were "It's Raining", released 31 March; "Crushed.zip" released 27 April; "On & On" released 25 May; and "Into the Sun" released 28 June.

== Style and reception ==
World Wide Pop ratings
Aggregate scores
Source	Rating
Metacritic	70/100
Review scores
Source	Rating
AllMusic	2.5/5 stars
Rolling Stone	3/5 stars
The Skinny	5/5 stars
Slant Magazine	2.5/5 stars
Uncut	8/10

According to the review aggregator Metacritic, World Wide Pop received "generally favorable reviews" based on a weighted average score of 70 out of 100 from 9 critic scores. The Skinny's Anita Bhadani wrote that the album, "Superorganism's ambitiously weird take on pop", isn't new for subverting pop but is made more special because "in a saturated scene Superorganism have pulled off something wholly unique and – most importantly – fun." The album's "future-facing sound draws more from the 'cut-and-paste' ethos of the indie heyday than hyperpop", and while its maximalist core can sometimes be overdone such as on "Solar System", "on the whole it finds the sweet spot between chaos and structure, silliness and depth, and it's a banger."

Slant Magazine's Steve Erickson wrote that the band's "sophomore effort doubles down on their copy-and-paste approach, but this time with mixed results." Given the rise of hyperpop in the intervening years since the band's 2018 debut album, "songs like "Black Hole Baby" sound kitschy and backward-looking in comparison—more Avalanches than 100 gecs." The first album's "groovier, danceable tempos have been replaced with more upbeat, jittery arrangements on World Wide Pop, and while the group's personality shines through in the album's aggressive, deceptively cheery production, the songs hint at an anxiety that's never fully fleshed out." Ultimately, the album "succumbs to sameiness, with several songs in a row set to a similarly frantic tempo and overly compressed, treble-heavy sound mix." Erickson closes by noting lyrics from "Put Down Your Phone" which "allude to the slow disintegration of our attention spans", stating that "Unfortunately, merely calling out our hyperactive attention spans doesn't prevent Superorganism from surrendering to it."

=== Year-end lists ===
World Wide Pop on year-end lists
Publication	#	Ref.
Under the Radar	100	

== Track listing ==
All tracks are written and produced by Superorganism, except where noted.

World Wide Pop track listing
No.	Title	Writer(s)	Producer(s)	Length
1.	"Black Hole Baby"	Superorganism; John Sebastian	Superorganism; John Hill	3:18
2.	"World Wide Pop"			2:37
3.	"On & On"		Superorganism; Stuart Price	3:10
4.	"Teenager" (featuring Chai and Pi Ja Ma)		Superorganism; Price	2:59
5.	"It's Raining" (featuring Dylan Cartlidge and Stephen Malkmus)	Superorganism; Scott Engel		3:12
6.	"Flying"			2:49
7.	"Solar System" (featuring Chai, Pi Ja Ma, Boa Constrictors, Axel Concato and Paul Concato)			3:32
8.	"Into the Sun" (featuring Gen Hoshino, Stephen Malkmus, Pi Ja Ma and Axel Concato)	Superorganism; Pi Ja Ma; Axel Concanto		3:20
9.	"Put Down Your Phone"		Price	3:14
10.	"Crushed.zip"		Hill; Price	3:34
11.	"Oh Come On"			2:31
12.	"Don't Let the Colony Collapse"			3:46
13.	"Everything Falls Apart"			2:17
Total length:				40:31

== Charts ==
Chart performance for World Wide Pop
Chart (2022)	Peak position
Japanese Albums (Oricon)	57
Japanese Hot Albums (Billboard Japan)	64
Scottish Albums (OCC)	50
UK Albums (OCC)	99
UK Independent Albums (OCC)	6
