= Wrong Cops =

- Directed by: Quentin Dupieux
- Written by: Quentin Dupieux
- Produced by: Gregory Bernard; Josef Lieck; Diane Jassem; Sergey Selyanov; Daniel Goroshko
- Starring: Mark Burnham; Éric Judor; Steve Little; Marilyn Manson; Arden Myrin; Eric Wareheim; Jon Lajoie; Ray Wise
- Cinematography: Quentin Dupieux
- Edited by: Quentin Dupieux
- Music by: Mr. Oizo
- Production company: Realitism Films
- Distributed by: UFO Distribution (France)
- Release date: January 20, 2013 (Sundance Film Festival)
- Running time: 94 minutes
- Countries: France; United States
- Language: English

Wrong Cops is a 2013 French-American independent comedy film written and directed by Quentin Dupieux. The ensemble film premiered at the 2013 Sundance Film Festival. It features an ensemble cast including Éric Judor, Mark Burnham, Arden Myrin, Steve Little, Jon Lajoie, Jack Plotnick, Ray Wise, Kurt Fuller, Eric Wareheim, Grace Zabriskie and Marilyn Manson.

== Premise ==
In the not very distant future, where crime has been completely eradicated, a group of crooked cops look to dispose of a body that one of them accidentally shot.

== Cast ==
- Mark Burnham as Officer Duke
- Éric Judor as Officer Rough
- Steve Little as Officer Sunshine
- Eric Wareheim as Officer De Luca
- Arden Myrin as Officer Holmes
- Brandon Beemer as Officer Brown
- Jon Lajoie as Officer Regan
- Ray Wise as Captain Andy
- Marilyn Manson as David Delores Frank
- Daniel Quinn as Neighbor
- Hillary Tuck as Kylie
- Isabella Palmieri as Rose
- Jennifer Blanc as Ruth
- Agnes Bruckner as Julia Kieffer
- Kurt Fuller as Music Producer
- Eric Roberts as Bob
- Steve Howey as Sandy / Michael
- Grace Zabriskie as Donna
- Jack Plotnick as Dolph Springer

== Production ==
The first trailer was launched on November 22, 2013. Executive Producer was Gregory Bernard and the film was produced by Diane Jassem, Sergey Selyanov, Daniel Goroshko and Josef Lieck for Realitism Films.

== Critical reception ==
From Christie Ko of ScreenCrave:

Marilyn Manson wanted to shoot something with Mr. Dupieux and this is what came out. It's funny, disturbing, and unabashedly wrong.

From Alex Koehne of Twitch:

Wrong Cops certainly has a sense of humor that isn't for anyone. If you like the exploitation films of the 70's and 80's, the abstract ridiculousness of Tim and Eric and Monty Python, the violence of grind-house cinema and the homespun stylings of web series and Funny or Die sketches, then you are primed and ready to love Wrong Cops. If Family Circus is your favorite comic, then you should steer clear.

From Scott Menzel of We Live Film did not care for the film:

I can only hope that Wrong Cops isn't what is next to come from the director and is simply a speed bump in his career. This is probably one of the most painfully unfunny and longest 45 minutes that I have ever had to sit through in quite sometime. It is without a doubt the worst film that I saw at Sundance 2013.
