= The Mighty Redcar =

2018 BBC documentary series

- Genre: Documentary
- Directed by: Dan Dewsbury; Stuart Bernard; Jonny Ashton
- Narrated by: Madison Cooper
- Opening theme: Friday Afternoons ("Cuckoo")
- Composer: Mat Davidson
- Country of origin: United Kingdom
- Original language: English
- No. of series: 1
- No. of episodes: 4

Production
- Executive producer: John Douglas
- Production location: Redcar
- Editors: Samuel Sananta; Sam Bergson; Reva Childs
- Camera setup: Dan Dewsbury
- Running time: 45 minutes
- Production company: 72 Films

Original release
- Network: BBC Two
- Release: 6 September – 27 September 2018

The Mighty Redcar is a 2018 British documentary series first aired on BBC Two. Marketed by the BBC as a "real-life soap opera", the four part series focuses on young people from the town of Redcar and nearby Grangetown, an area with high unemployment following the 2015 closure of SSI Redcar steelworks. The show was praised for its portrayal of the area and for avoiding the "poverty porn" stereotypes associated with similar documentaries.

== Background ==
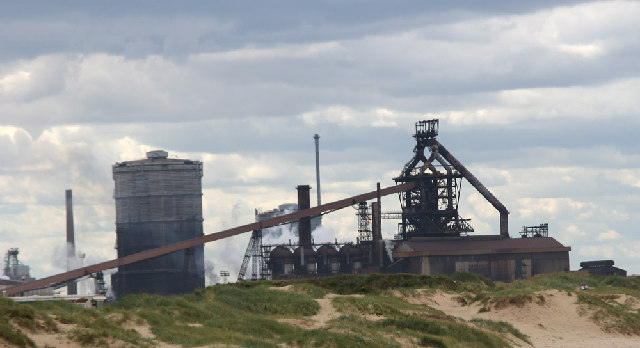
The now-closed blast furnace at Redcar steelworks, seen in operation in 2005.

Like many former industrial areas in the United Kingdom, Redcar – formerly a popular seaside resort and a centre for steel and chemical production – has seen a downturn in its fortunes following deindustrialisation and now suffers from deprivation. Following the closure of the steelworks in 2015, which was a significant employer in the town, Redcar attracted a number of news crews and documentary makers, including a 50-day series of reportage from Panorama. The tone of the Panorama documentary and other reports was negative and pessimistic, and the BBC wanted a more "optimistic" documentary to balance it and to "shine a light on the under-represented North East of England". They commissioned filmmaker Dan Dewsbury to produce a series about life in the town, focusing on the next generation.

== Production ==
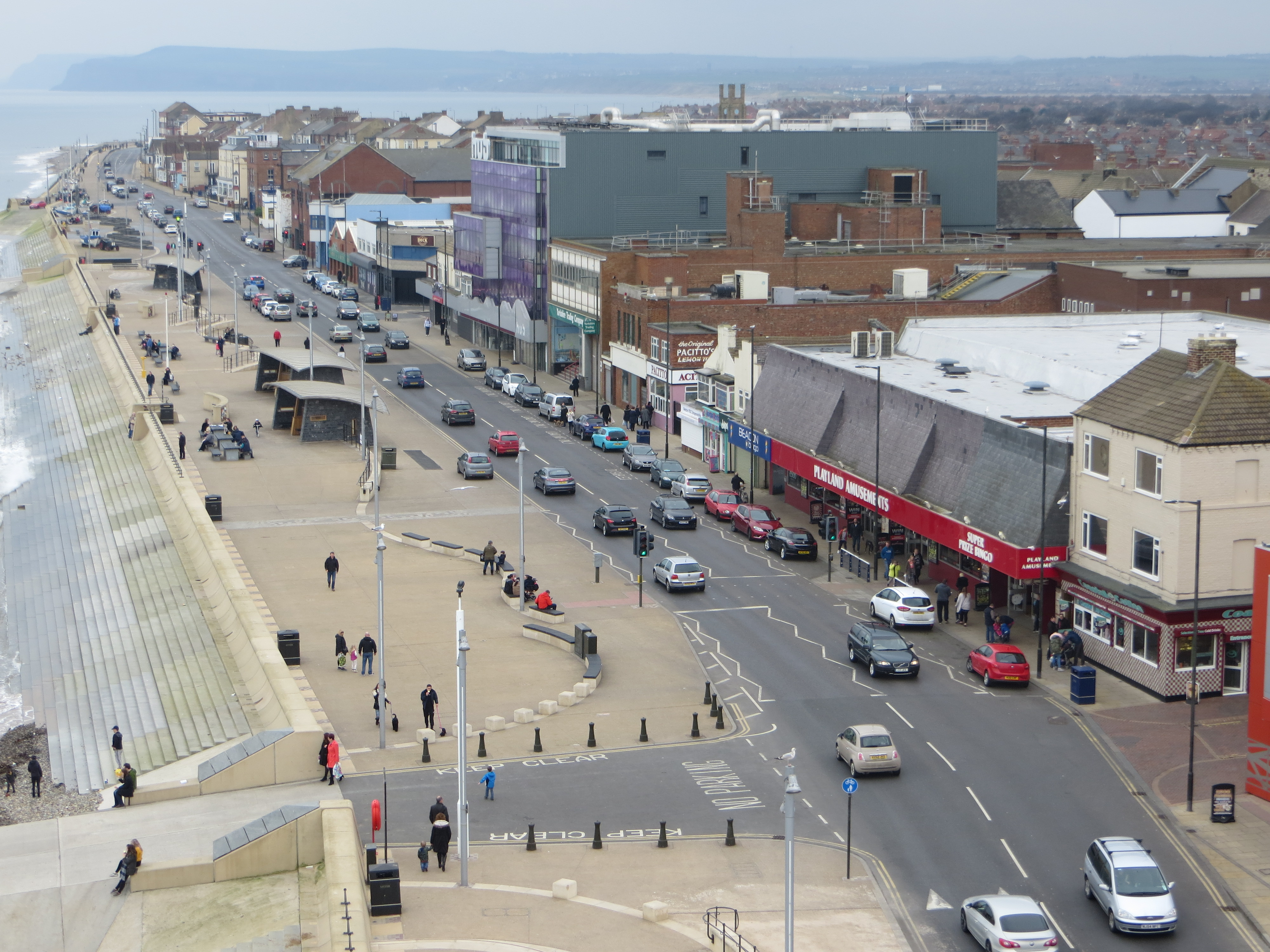
Redcar seafront. The crew lived in the area for the duration of the shoot.

Filming began in November 2016, with Dewsbury and the crew moving to Redcar in February 2017 and living for nine months in the town above a fish and chips shop. Half of the crew was local – the drone photography was by a former Redcar steelworker Lee Bullock and Madison Cooper, a 17-year-old student, provides the voiceover.

The documentary makers interviewed around 400 people for the series. After facing initial reluctance from locals, who worried that the show would depict locals in a negative manner similar to Benefits Street, the second series of which was filmed in nearby Stockton-on-Tees, the crew were able to persuade them that it would "not insult" the Redcar residents.

== Episode list ==
No.	Title	Original release date
1	"Episode 1"	6 September 2018
The first episode introduces James, Dylan and Kaitlyn. James, who has no GCSEs and whose father is in prison, is mentored by a local businessman who finds him work as a landscaper. Dylan, an aspiring hip hop musician, tries to get a record deal. Kaitlyn wants to go into acting, and as the school prom approaches her mother Kat is working three jobs to pay for her to attend RADA drama school.
2	"Episode 2"	13 September 2018
James is arrested on suspicion of theft, but denies the allegation. With his mentor's help, he gets an apprenticeship at a call centre. With money tight, Kat and Kaitlyn find themselves having to move house yet again, but Kaitlyn triumphs in her GCSEs. Netball player Safy wins a 90% scholarship at a private sports college, but her mother finds paying the remaining 10% a struggle. A witness comes forward, and James admits to the theft – he is sentenced to community service and loses his apprenticeship.
3	"Episode 3"	20 September 2018
The town has come together to raise money for Safy’s school fees but is it enough? Bean must choose between his first love and the chance of a new life away from Redcar, and James gets one final chance to change his life around.
4	"Episode 4"	27 September 2018
Boris Johnson-loving activist Jade is battling to win the hearts and minds of the predominantly Labour town. Amber, living out of her car, struggles to keep her job as nurse, and 16-year-old Billy realises that working for a living might not be for him.

== Reception ==
The Mighty Redcar was well received by critics. Several praised its depiction of the people of Redcar, with Chitra Ramaswamy of The Guardian calling it "the antidote to Benefits Street, Born Famous or any of the other vile caricatures that make up the objectionable genre of poverty porn", Carol Midgley of The Times saying it "could have been dreadful and patronising, but it was rather wonderful", and the reviewer for The Northern Echo noting "it was warm, moving and a refreshing change to see such an honest, but uplifting depiction of life for young people in the North-East".

Local people were also generally positive about the series, although several Redcar residents criticised the decision to film much of the show in Grangetown; although part of the Redcar and Cleveland district, it is separate from the town and lies closer to Middlesbrough.

The programme won the Royal Television Society Award for ‘Best Factual Programme’ 2019 and was nominated for a BAFTA in the Television Awards for 'Best Cinematography'. It was nominated for'Best Original Programme' at the 2019 Broadcast Awards.

The camera team won the Guild of Television and Film Award for 'Best Cinematography' 2019.

In late 2019 the camera team won the award for ‘Best Factual Cinematography’ at the Royal Television Society Craft Awards beating competition which included David Attenborough’s ‘Dynasties’ series.
