= Alaya High =

American musician and actress (born 2007)

That Girl Lay Lay
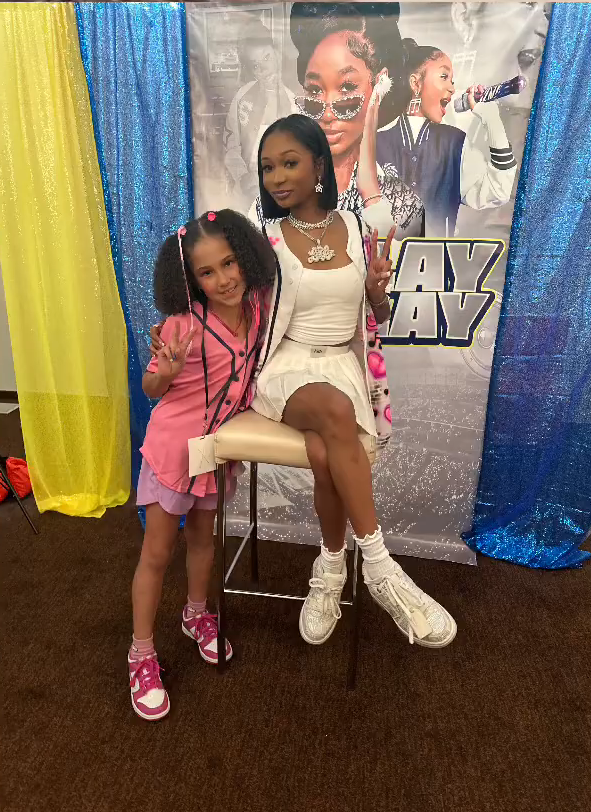
- That Girl Lay Lay with vlogger, Nova Elle, at a Meet & Greet concert in 2024
- Born: Alaya High; January 28, 2007 (age 19); Houston, Texas, U.S.
- Other name: Lay Lay
- Occupations: Rapper; actress; singer
- Years active: 2013–present
- Known for: Freestyle Friday, That Girl Lay Lay
- Parents: Acie High (father); Antanique Landry (mother)
- Awards: Crown Awards, Wonder Girl Award
- Musical career
- Genre: Southern hip-hop
- Instrument: Vocals
- Label: Atlantic
- Website: www.laylaysdrip.com

Alaya High (born January 28, 2007), known professionally as That Girl Lay Lay, is an American rapper, singer, social media personality, and actress who began her career at the age of 6 on YouTube and is best known for starring in the Nickelodeon sitcom That Girl Lay Lay (2021–2024). At the age of 11, she became the youngest female African American rapper to have a record deal with Empire Distribution, with her debut single "Go, Lay Lay, Go" and debut album Tha Cheat Code (2018). She has also worked on a series of books with Scholastic publishing.

She also once made an appearance, alongside B. Simone, on Wild 'n Out.

== Personal life and career ==
=== Music ===
Alaya High was born in Houston, on January 28, 2007. She got her start in music when her parents posted videos of her rapping covers to hip-hop songs on YouTube, and rapping covers of different Christian rap songs for the youth ministry at her local church her family attended. She subsequently began writing her own rap and hip hop songs that she posted on YouTube and Instagram.

In 2018, she was given a recording contract with Empire Distribution under the record label, Fresh Rebel Musik, and recorded her debut album, Tha Cheat Code, and also recorded a single to accompany the album, Go, Lay Lay, Go, with Empire. After rising to fame with Tha Cheat Code and Go, Lay Lay, Go, she was invited to perform at the 93rd Annual Macy's Thanksgiving Day Parade in 2019, and went on to perform at Nickelodeon's All-Star Nickmas Holiday Spectacular in 2020. She also performed on The Ellen DeGeneres Show while promoting her new album.

High became one of the youngest female rappers to be given a record deal at 11 years old, and went on to record other children's and teen-themed rap and hip hop albums with Empire such as Tha Cheat Code Reloaded (2019), All Tha Way Lit Up (2019), and Recess Is Over (2020). She also released several singles, both by herself and as collaborations with other rappers such as Mama (2019), Long Hair (2020), Show and Tell (2020), Jingle Rock Baby (a Christmas single, 2020), A World by Us (2021), and I'm That! (in collaboration with fellow Nickelodeon child actor and rapper, Young Dylan, in 2021). She also performed at the 2022 Nickelodeon Kids' Choice Awards.

=== Acting ===
High made her acting debut in 2019 when she did minor voice roles for the movie, The Lego Movie 2: The Second Part, and collaborated on the theme song for the film's soundtrack, Catchy Song, with rapper T-Pain and producer Dillon Francis. In 2020, she signed a deal with Nickelodeon to develop original multi-platform programming, music initiatives, and build a consumer product business catering to children and teens, and highlighting young actors and creative artists. As a part of this deal, High was given her own television series on Nickelodeon, That Girl Lay Lay (2021–2024), where she played as an artificially intelligent avatar on a phone app that comes to life as a human teen girl, when the owner of the phone, Sadie, wishes she had a friend who could help her stand out and be more outgoing in her high school career and social life. The show premiered on Nickelodeon on September 23, 2021, and was renewed for a second season on January 28, 2022, until the show finally ended in 2024. High has also guest starred in other Nickelodeon series such as Side Hustle, Tyler Perry's Young Dylan, and Danger Force.

Following the conclusion of her television series, Alaya High has focused on building a presence on social media platforms such as Instagram and TikTok, and has shifted her focus toward creating rap and hip hop music for a broader young adult audience. She also currently stars in the Disney Channel series Vampirina: Teenage Vampire as of 2025.

== Filmography ==
Television and film roles
Year	Title	Role	Notes
2019	The Lego Movie 2: The Second Part	Minor various voice roles	Also collaborated on the theme song for the film's soundtrack, Catchy Song
2019	93rd Annual Macy's Thanksgiving Day Parade	Herself	Guest performer
2020	Group Chat with Jayden and Brent	Herself	Guest
2020	The All-Star Nickmas Spectacular	Herself	Guest performer
2021	Nickelodeon Kids' Choice Awards 2021	Herself	Special guest
2021	Danger Force	That Girl Lay Lay	Episode; "Drive Hard"
2021–2024	That Girl Lay Lay	Lay Lay	Main character
2022	Nickelodeon Kids' Choice Awards 2022	Herself	Special guest
2022	Side Hustle	Lay Lay	Episode; "When Worlds Collide"
2022	Tyler Perry's Young Dylan	Lay Lay	Episode; "How To Catch a Scammer"
2022	The Tiny Chef Show	Herself	Special guest; episode: "Cranberry Cookies"
2024	Beauty and the Beast - Kinigra Deon	LayLay	Special guest; episode: "2"
2025	Vampirina: Teenage Vampire	Alaya	Recurring character. 2 episodes: "First Dance"; "First Parents Day"

== Discography ==
=== Albums ===
List of albums
Year	Title	Record label	Notes
2018	Tha Cheat Code	Fresh Rebel Musik/EMPIRE Distribution	
2019	Tha Cheat Code Reloaded		
2019	All Tha Way Lit Up		Special Christmas album
2020	Recess Is Over	EMPIRE Distribution	
2022	Watch Me		

=== Singles ===
Year	Title	Peak chart positions	Album
Year	Title	Billboard Dance/Electronic Songs	Album
2018	"Go, Lay Lay, Go Fresh Rebel Musik/EMPIRE Distribution"	—	
2019	"Mama"	—	
2019	"Get To Lovin'"	—	
2019	"Supersize XL (feat. Lil Blurry & Lil Terrio) Collaboration"	—	
2020	"Long Hair EMPIRE Distribution"	—	
2020	"Stop Playin"	—	
2020	"Sisters"	—	
2020	"Show and Tell"	—	
2020	"For Me"	—	
2020	"Fly Away (feat. Lil Terrio & Lil Blurry) Collaboration"	—	
2020	"Jingle Rock Baby Special Christmas single"	—	
2021	"Breezy Collaboration with Young Dolph"	—	
2021	"I Need (feat. That Girl Lay Lay) Sony Music Entertainment Australia Collaboration with Lil' Treezy (stylized Lil Tr33zy)"	—	
2021	"TikTok"	—	
2021	"Beat (feat. Bun B) Collaboration with Bun B"	—	
2021	"Not Your Boo (feat. Twelly) Collaboration with Twelly"	—	
2021	"A World by Us!"	—	
2021	"I'm That! Collaboration with Young Dylan"	—	
2021	"Catchy Song"	19	The Lego Movie 2: The Second Part (soundtrack)
2022	"Remix"	—	
2022	"Do What I Want"	—	
"—" denotes a recording that did not chart or was not released in that territory.

== Awards ==
Year	Award	Category	Nominee(s)	Result	Ref.
2022	NAACP Image Awards	Outstanding Performance by a Youth	Alaya High	Nominated	
2022	Crown Awards	Young CROWN Award	Alaya High	Won	
2022	Women in Toys, Licensing & Entertainment	Wonder Girl Award	Alaya High	Won	
