= The Lego Movie 2: The Second Part =

2019 film by Mike Mitchell

- Theatrical release poster
- Directed by: Mike Mitchell
- Screenplay by: Phil Lord; Christopher Miller
- Story by: Phil Lord; Christopher Miller; Matthew Fogel
- Based on: Lego Construction Toys
- Produced by: Dan Lin; Phil Lord; Christopher Miller; Roy Lee; Jinko Gotoh
- Starring: Chris Pratt; Elizabeth Banks; Tiffany Haddish; Will Arnett; Stephanie Beatriz; Charlie Day; Alison Brie; Nick Offerman; Maya Rudolph
- Cinematography: Shelly Johnson (live-action sequences)
- Edited by: Clare Knight
- Music by: Mark Mothersbaugh (score); Jon Lajoie (songs)
- Production companies: Warner Animation Group; Lego System A/S; Rideback; Lord Miller Productions; Vertigo Entertainment; Animal Logic
- Distributed by: Warner Bros. Pictures
- Release dates: February 2, 2019 (Regency Village Theatre); February 7, 2019 (Denmark); February 8, 2019 (United States); March 21, 2019 (Australia)
- Running time: 107 minutes
- Countries: Australia; Denmark; United States
- Language: English
- Budget: $99 million
- Box office: $199.6 million

The Lego Movie 2: The Second Part is a 2019 animated musical adventure comedy film directed by Mike Mitchell and written by Phil Lord and Christopher Miller. Based on the Lego construction toys, it is the fourth and final installment in the Warner Bros. The Lego Movie film series and the sequel to The Lego Movie (2014). Chris Pratt, Elizabeth Banks, Will Arnett, Charlie Day, Alison Brie and Nick Offerman reprise their roles from the first film, with Tiffany Haddish, Stephanie Beatriz and Maya Rudolph joining the cast. The film takes place five years after the events of the previous film and follows Emmet Brickowski, Lucy and their friends, who travel into the Systar System to test their skills and creativity, while Emmet deals with a coming cataclysm known as "Armamageddon".

Development of a sequel to The Lego Movie began in February 2014. In March, it was announced that the film would be directed by Chris McKay and in October it was reported that Lord and Miller would return as the screenwriters. In February 2015, McKay was replaced as director by Rob Schrab, who in turn was replaced in February 2017 by Mike Mitchell, reportedly due to creative differences. Production for the film began in October 2017, with the majority of the cast returning to voice the characters in mid-2018, along with the new cast. As with the previous films in the franchise, the animation was provided by Animal Logic. Mark Mothersbaugh, who composed The Lego Movie and The Lego Ninjago Movie, returned to compose the film's musical score, with artists including Dillon Francis, Beck, Robyn and The Lonely Island providing original songs for the film.

The Lego Movie 2: The Second Part premiered in Los Angeles on February 2, 2019, and was released in the United States on February 8 by Warner Bros. Pictures. It received generally positive reviews from critics, although it was considered inferior to its predecessor. Despite grossing $199.6 million against a budget of $99 million, the film became the franchise's second box office disappointment after The Lego Ninjago Movie. After the film's commercial underperformance, Warner Bros. ultimately let their Lego film rights expire and eventually be picked up by Universal Pictures in 2020, making The Second Part the final installment of Warner Bros.' Lego Movie franchise and the last theatrical film based on the Lego brand until Universal released Piece by Piece in 2024.

== Plot ==
Shortly after the destruction of the Kragle via the Piece of Resistance, (Note: As depicted in The Lego Movie (2014)) Duplo aliens arrive and threaten destruction. Emmet builds the aliens a heart as a token of friendship, but one eats it and demands more. Lucy and the Master Builders believe this to be an attack and retaliate, and the ensuing battle ravages Bricksburg. Five years later, a teenage Finn has rebuilt Bricksburg as Apocalypseburg. The city has been ravaged by repeated Duplo attacks, and several people have gone missing while searching for the Duplo home planet. Emmet remains upbeat, in stark contrast to Lucy and his other friends, though he has visions of an impending "Armamageddon".

A mini-doll called General Sweet Mayhem arrives, kidnaps all of Emmet's friends, and takes them to the shape-shifting ruler of the Systar System, Queen Watevra Wa'Nabi. Emmet tries to convince the Master Builders to help him save Lucy and the rest of his friends, but they refuse to help, believing that he is not tough enough to go through the Systar System. Emmet subsequently crafts a spaceship to pursue Mayhem by passing through the "Stairgate". Meanwhile, Watevra has apparently brainwashed Emmet's friends into accepting the joy of her world and convinces Batman to marry her as a way to unite the Lego, Mini-doll, and Duplo worlds. Only Lucy remains skeptical of Watevra's plans.

Emmet's ship is heavily damaged and nearly collides with an glass-like asteroid field but is saved by an rugged space-time-travelling adventurer Rex Dangervest. After hearing Emmet's story, Rex offers to help and takes him to the Systar System. En route, Emmet tries to emulate some of Rex's mannerisms and learn Rex's "Master Breaker" abilities. When they arrive, they quickly reunite with Lucy and learn of the marriage plans, which Rex, Lucy, and Emmet believe to be a front to bring on Armamageddon.

As the wedding starts, Emmet, Rex, and Lucy split up to sabotage the event. Mayhem, who insists the wedding is intended to prevent Armamageddon, intercepts Lucy and explains their true intentions. At the ceremony, Watevra reveals her true form: the heart that Emmet tried to give the Duplo invaders. Realizing that Mayhem was right, Lucy tries to stop Emmet, but he destroys the ceremony with a Master Breaker punch. In reality, Finn, after finding out that his sister, Bianca, had taken his Lego figures, smashes her ceremony creation. Emmet realizes his mistake but is seized by Rex, who reveals he is a version of him from the future, who collided with the asteroids and ended up under a dryer when he was young as Emmet. Embittered and resenting his friends for forgetting him, he changed his name and appearance and created a space time-traveling machine to pick up the raptors and return to help Emmet but to make sure that Armamageddon came to pass as revenge against his friends and everyone who doubted him. When Emmet refuses to abandon his friends, Rex, infuriated at Emmet's "betrayal", usurps and knocks him under the same dryer, ensuring that Rex will continue to exist forever.

In the real world, Finn and Bianca's mother, having had to walk in on them for the past five years and fed up with their bickering jealousy, scolds and orders them to put the Lego toys into a storage bin as punishment for their arguments; Lucy recognizes this as Armamageddon, which turns out to be "our mama gets in". The Lego worlds began to fall apart as everyone is sucked into a dark void into the storage bin and fear they will not escape.

Meanwhile, Finn finds the pieces of Watevra's form in one of the storage bins. The form's revealed to be a heart that Finn gave Bianca five years earlier, telling her it can be "whatever you want it to be". Finn and Bianca reconcile and start playing together. In the Lego universe, this act inspires Lucy and the others to escape the bin to save Emmet, stop Rex and help rebuild Watevra's world while fighting off the raptors. In an ensuing fight, Lucy then saves Emmet from Rex, destroying the time machine in the process. Emmet comes to accept that he will never be like Rex, and with this self-realization, Rex begins to disappear, but not before realizing the error of his ways and encouraging Emmet to keep going forward and keep being himself. Rex fades from existence, correcting a time paradox.

After that, Batman and Watevra are married, and Finn and Bianca are back in their normal lives after their Lego toys are brought back. Their mother sees them playing together and happily watches them. The Lego universe is recreated as a mish-mash of Apocalypseburg and the Systar System, renamed Syspocalypstar. When Emmet's home is rebuilt, Lucy gives Emmet her copy of the original album of "Everything Is Awesome", revealing to Emmet that she was originally part of the band that created the song.

== Cast ==
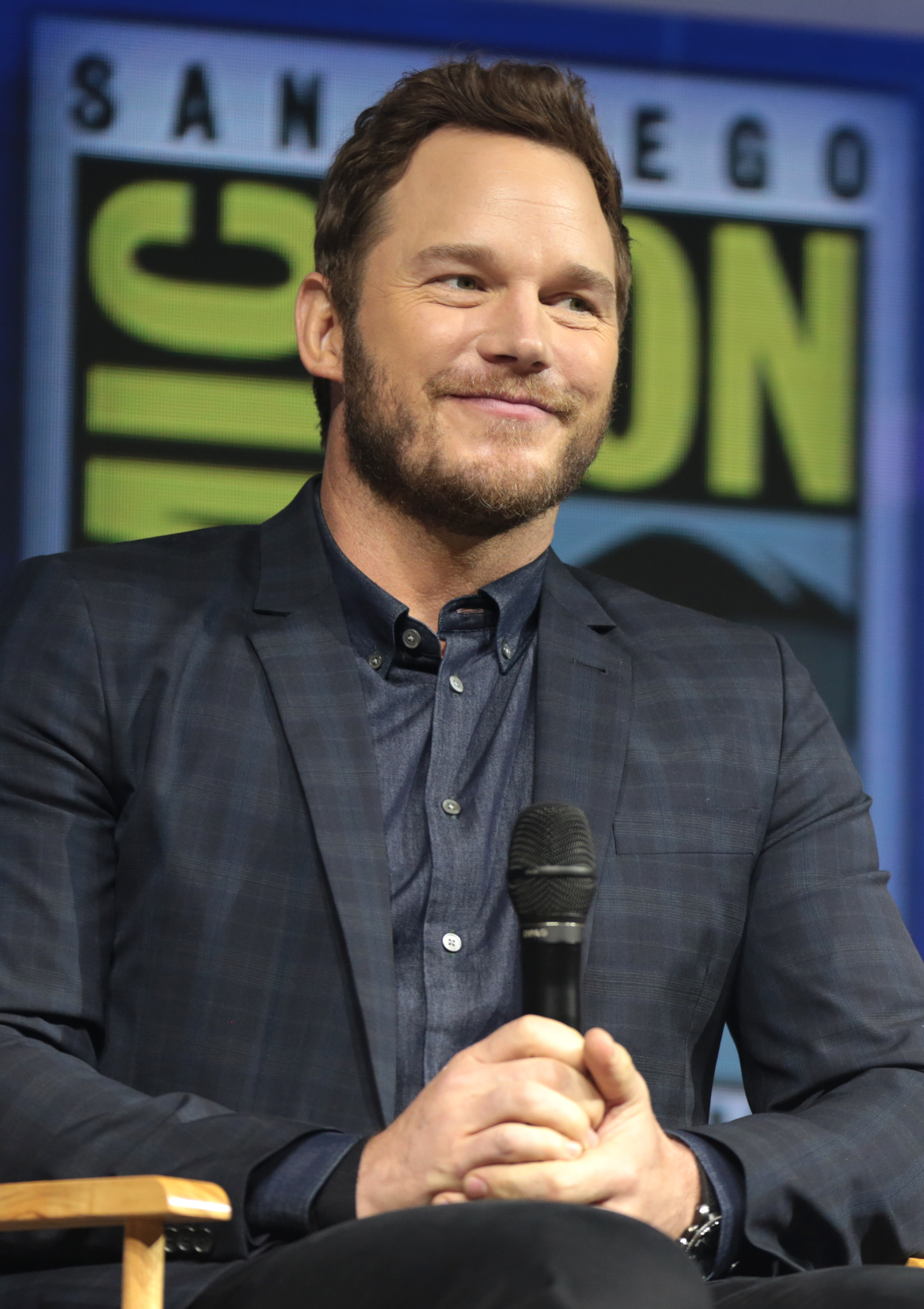
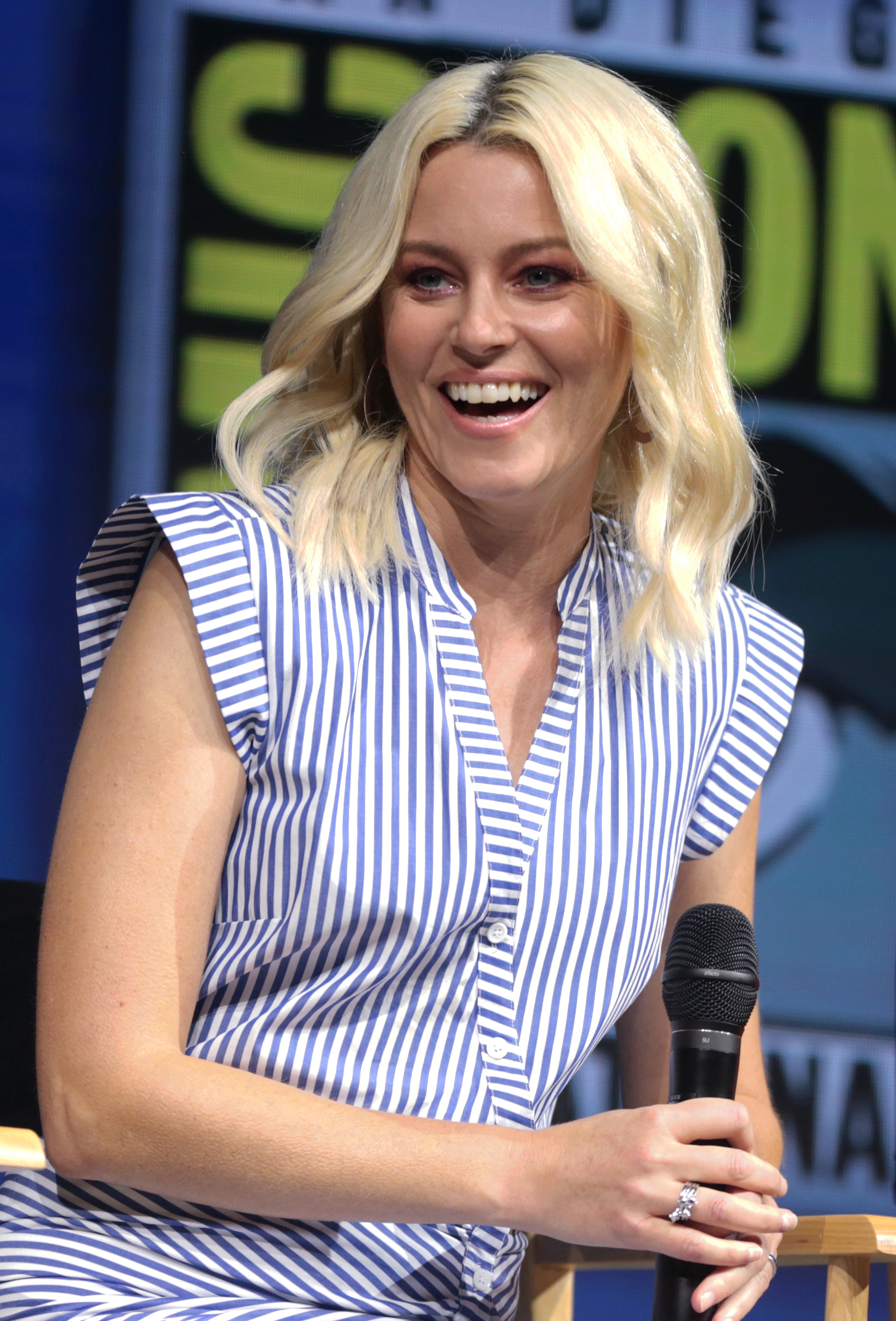
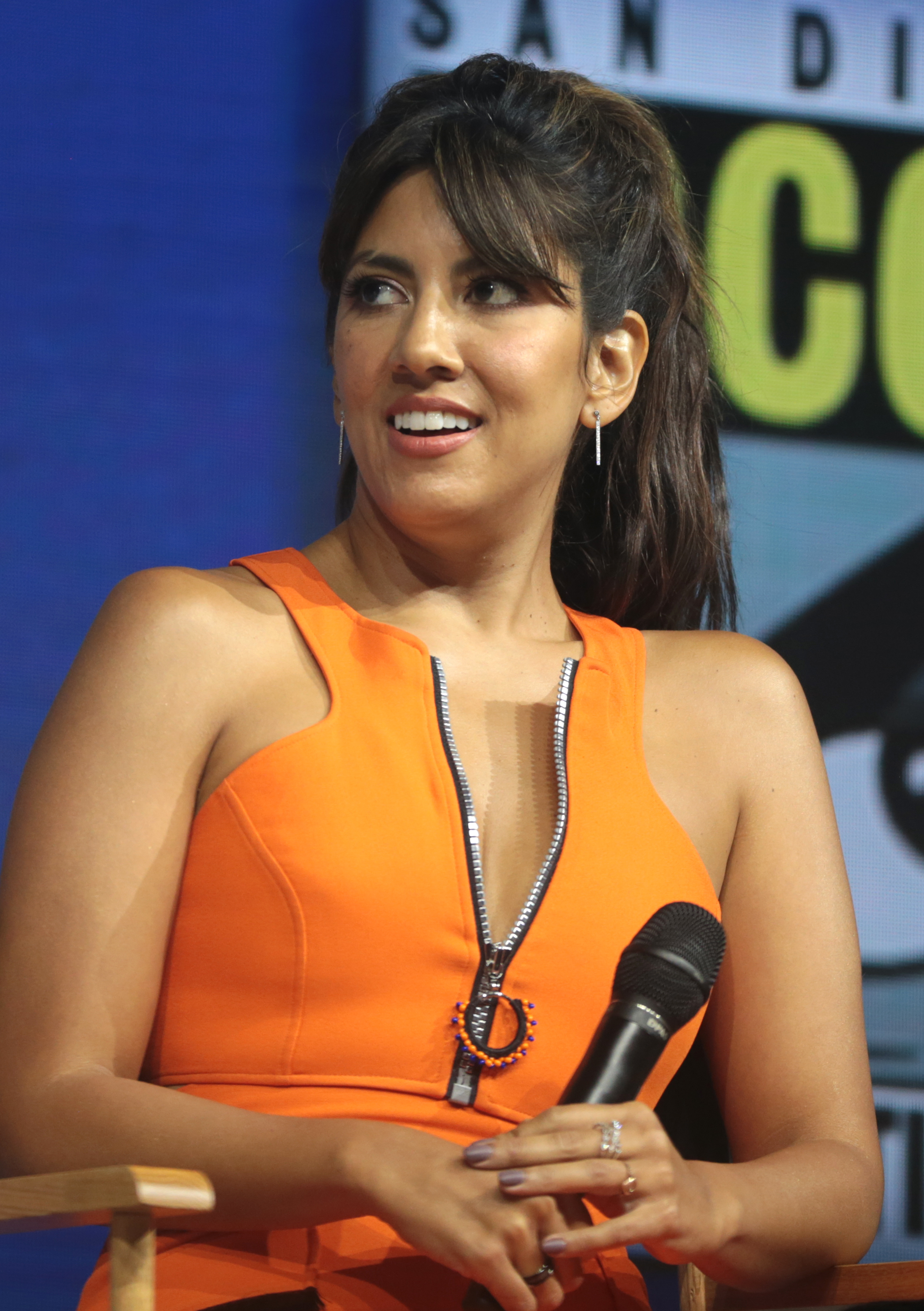
Chris Pratt, Elizabeth Banks and Stephanie Beatriz promoting the film at the 2018 San Diego Comic-Con
- Chris Pratt as Emmet Brickowski, an everyman, construction worker, and a Master Builder from Bricksburg and Lucy's boyfriend.
  - Pratt also voices Rex "Micthell Ninjastar" Dangervest, a self-proclaimed "galaxy-defender, archaeologist, cowboy, and raptor trainer." He is eventually revealed to be Emmet's dangerously nihilistic future self. His character is based on Pratt's most famous roles.
- Elizabeth Banks as Lucy / Wyldstyle, a Master Builder and Emmet's girlfriend.
- Will Arnett as Bruce Wayne / Batman, a DC Comics superhero who is a Master Builder and Wyldstyle's ex-boyfriend.
- Tiffany Haddish as Queen Watevra Wa'Nabi, the shape-shifting alien queen of the Systar System that was made by Emmet as a heart. Her name is a pun on the phrase "whatever I want to be", itself a descriptor of her shape-shifting abilities, which are displayed when she changes into multiple forms throughout the movie.
- Stephanie Beatriz as General Sweet Mayhem, an intergalactic mini-doll who serves as the intergalactic naval commander and law enforcer of the Systar System Armed Forces. She is the right-hand woman to Queen Watevra Wa'Nabi.
- Charlie Day as Benny, a Master Builder who is a spaceship-obsessed 1980s spaceman. In contrast to the previous movie, he has a metallic arm.
- Alison Brie as Princess Unikitty / Ultrakatty, a Master Builder who is a unicorn-horned cat. In this film, instead of turning red when angry, she is red right from the outset. Over the years since the first film, she has developed the ability to become a giant version of herself called "Ultrakatty" when combat is about to occur.
- Nick Offerman as MetalBeard, a Master Builder who is a large bionic pirate with a severed head after he lost his original body in an earlier encounter with Lord Business' forces.
- Jadon Sand as Finn, a young teenager in the real world, whose imagination drives the events happening in the Lego universe.
- Brooklynn Prince as Bianca, Finn's younger sister, who is the reason why the aliens from the planet Duplo attacked Bricksburg.
- Maya Rudolph as Mom, the unnamed mother of Finn and Bianca. She is the force in the real world that brings about "Armamageddon" (portmanteau of "our mom" and "Armageddon"). She was previously voiced off-screen by Amanda Farinos in the first film.
- Will Ferrell as President Business, the former President of the Octan corporation and the Lego World, who served as the main antagonist of the first film.
  - Ferrell also voices The Man Upstairs, a Lego collector who is Finn and Bianca's father. Outside of re-used footage from the first film, Ferrell does not appear on-screen in this role, performing only in an off-screen voiceover, except for a brief shot of a photo of the Man Upstairs and his family on a log flume ride that can be seen in his daughter Bianca's bedroom.
- Richard Ayoade as "Ice Cream Cone", a talking ice cream cone and citizen of the Systar System who serves as Queen Watevra Wa'Nabi's aide.
- Channing Tatum as Superman, a DC Comics superhero, and one of the Master Builders.
- Jonah Hill as Green Lantern, a DC Comics superhero, and one of the Master Builders.
- Cobie Smulders as Wonder Woman, a DC Comics superhero who is an ambassador of the Amazon people as well as a Master Builder.
- Jason Momoa as Aquaman, a DC Comics superhero who is the king of Atlantis and is also a Master Builder. Momoa reprises his role from the DC Extended Universe.
- Margot Rubin as:
  - Susan, a mini-doll, and one of Queen Watevra Wa-Nabi's servants.
  - Mermaid, an inhabitant of Apocalypseburg.
  - Wonder Woman (mini-doll), an inhabitant of Harmony Town.
  - Panda, a panda-masked inhabitant of Apocalypseburg.
- Ike Barinholtz as Lex Luthor, a DC Comics supervillain, Master Builder and arch-enemy of Superman. Strangely, he and the Man of Steel have somehow become best friends after being brain-washed by the Queen.
- Ralph Fiennes as Alfred Pennyworth, a DC Comics character and Master Builder who is Batman's loyal Butler.
- Will Forte as Abraham Lincoln, the 16th President of the United States and a Master Builder.
- Bruce Willis as himself, a Lego caricature of the actor who appears in several scenes, including a running joke alluding to his character John McClane from the 20th Century Studios Die Hard franchise.
- Ben Schwartz as Banarnar, a sentient banana peel who is a citizen and the perpetual jester of the Systar System.
- Jimmy O. Yang as Zebe, a lavender and black zebra who is a citizen and the bus driver of the Systar System.
- Noel Fielding as Balthazar, a sparkly-faced teenage vampire, spa expert, and DJ from the planet Sparkle in the Systar System describing himself as an "attractive and non-threatening teen vampire." He is a nod to Edward Cullen from The Twilight Saga.
- Jorma Taccone as Larry Poppins, a male counterpart of Mary Poppins.
- Gary Payton as Himself, a Lego caricature of the basketball player who Emmet encounters in Apocalypseburg.
- Sheryl Swoopes as Herself, a Lego caricature of the basketball player who Emmet encounters in Apocalypseburg.
- Trisha Gum as Velma Dinkley, a member of Mystery Inc. from the Scooby-Doo franchise.
- Todd Hansen as Gandalf, a wizard from Middle-earth and a Master Builder. Hansen had voiced the same character in The Lego Movie.
  - Hansen also voices The Swamp Creature, a gill-man from Lego Monster Fighters and a Master Builder. He is also a recurring character from The Lego Movie.
- Doug Nicholas as Chainsaw Dave, a citizen of Apocalypseburg who was formerly known as Surfer Dave.
- Mike Mitchell as: Sherry Scratchen-Post, a cat lady who is a citizen of Apocalypseburg. Mitchel also voiced as:
  - A royal guard that works for Queen Watevra Wa'Nabi.
  - "Eight", an octopus who does massages and works at the spa in the Palace of Infinite Reflection.
  - A Harmony Town citizen
  - An announcer who announces the guests on the bride and groom's side
  - An Apocalypseburg warrior.
- Christopher Miller as: Chad, a citizen of the Systar System who is the DJ of the Pop-Up Party Bus under the stage name Tempo. Miller also voiced as:
  - A horse.
  - A talking chocolate bar that resides in the Systar System.
  - Plantimals, a plant-like creatures in the Systar System that live in the jungles near Harmony Town.
  - Paper Boy, a resident of Harmony Town.
- Emily Nordwind as Cleopatra, an Egyptian queen and Master Builder.
- Chris McKay as "Larry", a barista that works in Apocalypseburg.
- Ralph Halprin as "Dolphin Clock", an orbiting clock in the Systar System that is based on Bianca's actual clock.

Additionally, the characters of Bad Cop / Good Cop (now known as Scribble Cop) and Vitruvius' ghost return with brief lines of dialogue, voiced by uncredited actors in place of Liam Neeson and Morgan Freeman respectively.

== Production ==
=== Development ===
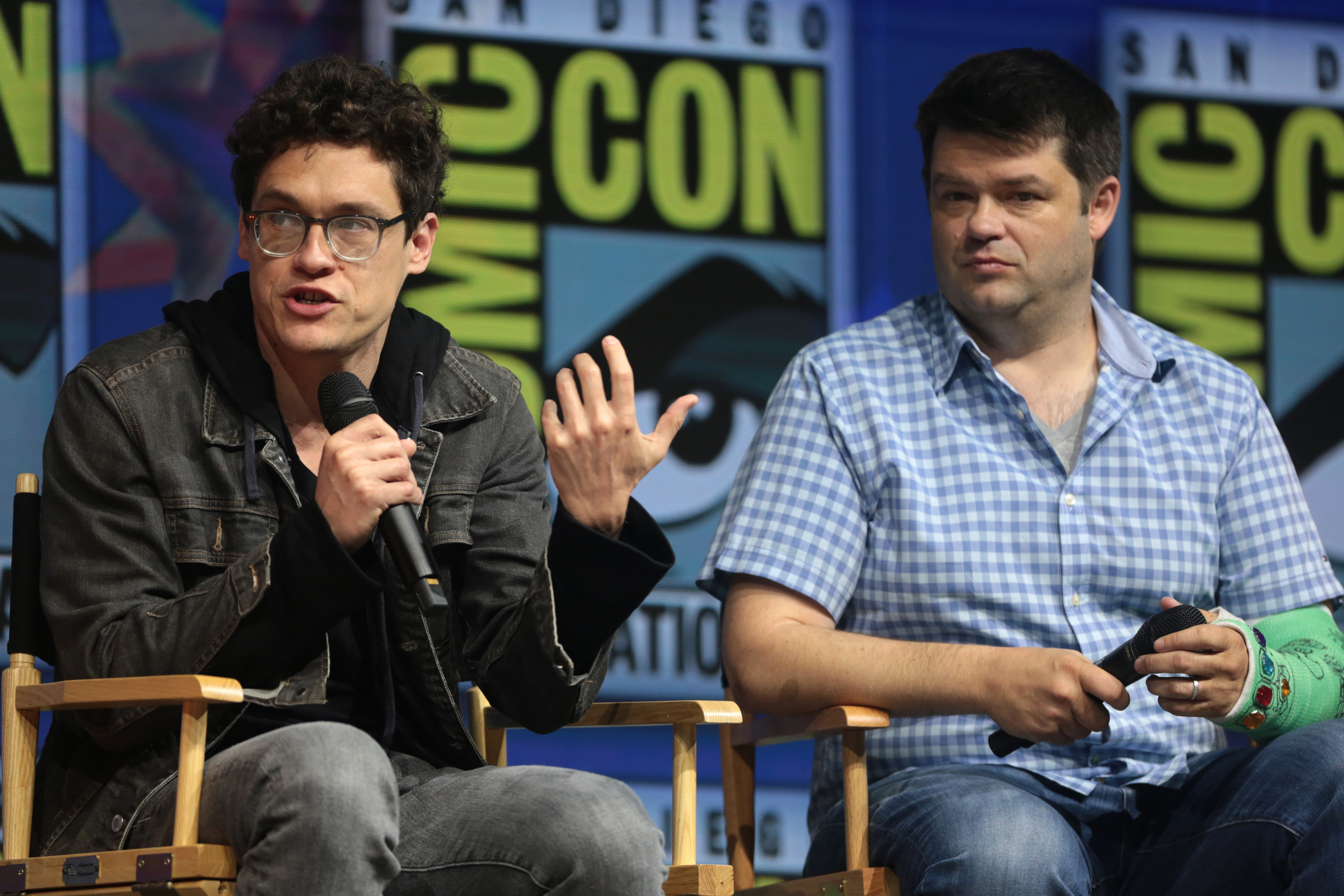
Phil Lord and Christopher Miller, who wrote and directed the first film, returned as writers and producers of the film.

On February 3, 2014, Jared Stern was hired to write the sequel, along with Michelle Morgan. On March 12, 2014, Deadline reported that animation co-director Chris McKay would direct the sequel with Phil Lord and Christopher Miller as producers. On April 10, 2014, it was reported that McKay wanted to have more women in the sequel than men. On July 28, 2014, it was reported that Chris Pratt wanted to return to reprise his role as Emmet. It was also reported that Will Arnett might return to reprise his role as Batman, but had not decided.

In October 2014, Warner Bros. scheduled The Lego Batman Movie for May 26, 2017, and The Lego Movie 2 for May 25, 2018. On October 25, 2014, it was reported that Lord and Miller had signed on to write The Lego Movie 2. On October 30, it was announced that Australia-based animation studio Animal Logic was in talks to produce the next three Lego films (though the deal was not finalized at the time) and the New South Wales government would make financial contributions to all the films. On November 12, during an interview with BBC News, Lord and Miller revealed that there would be more female characters featured in the film.

On February 24, 2015, the sequel was retitled The Lego Movie Sequel and Rob Schrab was announced as the film's director, replacing McKay as director as he was scheduled to direct The Lego Batman Movie instead. By November 2015, Miller announced that the first draft of the script was completed. Subsequent rewrites were provided by Raphael Bob-Waksberg, Dominic Russo and Matthew Fogel. By February 2017, Schrab had been replaced by Mike Mitchell, reportedly due to "creative differences". Production started in Canada on October 2, 2017. In an interview with Collider for the press day for The Lego Ninjago Movie, producer Dan Lin confirmed that Lord & Miller were rewriting the script during production. He also said that the sequel was going to include more songs due to the success of competing Disney musical films like Frozen and Moana.

The production of the film took advantage of Animal Logic's latest update to its trace renderer, Glimpse, to improve on-screen detail and depth-of-field. Miller stated that he will dedicate the film to his mother, Charlotte "Charie" Miller, who was born in July 1949 and who died in December 2018, two months before the film's release.

=== Writing ===
The Lego Movie 2's narrative begins after the events of the first film, just as Finn's toddler sister Bianca starts to play with Duplo blocks and tries to take over Bricksburg. In the intervening years, Bianca has taken more of the Lego sets to incorporate into her own creations. The animation team recognized that girls would likely not only use Lego bricks but also incorporate other materials, such as fabrics and paper, creating a challenge for their rendering team. They wanted these elements to appear as if a child was manipulating them through their stop-motion animation process. They explored multiple design styles for each playset that is within Bianca's room, the "Systar System", and developed new animation approaches for some of these styles, including using fewer frames as in inbetweening.

They also incorporated the Lego Friends line of toys aimed at girls, which include mini-dolls like General Sweet Mayhem. However, unlike traditional Lego mini-figurines, the Lego Friends' mini-dolls do not have the same articulation, for example, having no separate leg movement or wrists that rotate. The production team, working with Lego, did not want to create walking and movement patterns that did not match the articulation the real figurines could do, and came up with creative solutions for animating these in the film. This also created a challenge for at least one song and dance number; production brought in a choreographing team to help plan out the dance taking into account for the restrictions of movement for the mini-figures.

According to Lord and Miller, each Lego Movie takes place in the imagination of a child that represents the real and Lego worlds. Miller explained that the directors wanted to have its story be "more complicated and sophisticated". With The Lego Movie 2, both Finn and Bianca's imaginations drive certain scenes, and the creators opted to leave the film's vague parts if the scene was based on Finn's version, Bianca's version, or some combination.

Among the minifigures within the film is one based on Supreme Court Justice Ruth Bader Ginsburg. Lord and Miller had considered figures that would be unexpected within the film, with Ginsburg as one of their ideas. They received Ginsburg's blessing for this appearance, though she did not perform any voice work for this role.

=== Casting ===
On March 23, 2018, it was reported that Tiffany Haddish had been cast in the film to voice a new lead character, while returning actors would be Pratt as Emmet, Elizabeth Banks as Wyldstyle, Arnett as Batman, Channing Tatum as Superman, and Jonah Hill as Green Lantern. Stephanie Beatriz and Arturo Castro were announced to be part of the film on June 4, 2018. Castro was replaced by Richard Ayoade in the final film. During San Diego Comic-Con in 2018, it was announced that Pratt would also voice a new character in addition to Emmet, Rex Dangervest, who is based after Pratt himself. In November 2018, Maya Rudolph joined the cast. In early January 2019, it was revealed that Jason Momoa would reprise his role as Aquaman from the DC Extended Universe. Gal Gadot was to also reprise her role as Wonder Woman from the DC Extended Universe, replacing Cobie Smulders from the previous film, but Smulders ended up returning shortly before the film's release.

Daniel Radcliffe was originally set to voice a look-alike of his Harry Potter known as Larry Potter, but his scene was ultimately cut. It was revealed by Mitchell that Radcliffe's cameo was deleted due to not wanting to risk anything that would upset the Harry Potter fandom. The character was replaced by Larry Poppins (another look-alike character based on a British media icon).

== Music ==
Following the attempt to create an earworm with the first film's "Everything Is Awesome", the producers of the film created a similar song for the sequel, titled "Catchy Song", which principally features as its only lyric the repeated phrase "This song's gonna get stuck inside your head". The song was written by Jon Lajoie, and recorded by Dillon Francis, featuring T-Pain and Alaya High (the latter under her stage name That Girl Lay Lay). According to Lajoie, he found that "Everything Is Awesome" was "annoyingly catchy", and the only way that they could outdo that was "Dial the 'annoying' up to 11!".

Mark Mothersbaugh, who composed the first film's soundtrack, as well as the score for The Lego Ninjago Movie, returned to compose the score for the sequel. Both the soundtrack and score albums were released by WaterTower Music on February 7, 2019, a day before the film's release.

=== Songs ===
1. Everything Is Awesome (Tween Dream Remix) — performed by Garfunkel and Oates with Eban Schletter
2. 5:15 — sung by General Sweet Mayhem (Stephanie Beatriz)
3. Welcome to the Systar System — performed by Yossi Guetta, Esther Guetta, and Fiora Cutler
4. Not Evil — sung by Queen Watevra Wa'Nabi (Tiffany Haddish)
5. Catchy Song — performed by Dillon Francis ft. T-Pain and Alaya High
6. Gotham City Guys — sung by Queen Watevra Wa'Nabi (Tiffany Haddish) and Batman (Will Arnett)
7. Everything's Not Awesome — sung by The Lego Movie Cast
8. Super Cool — performed by Beck ft. Robyn and The Lonely Island
9. Come Together Now — performed by Matt and Kim
10. Hello Me and You — performed by Superorganism

== Marketing and release ==
The marketing campaign for The Lego Movie 2: The Second Part cost $100 million. Promotional partners included Chevrolet, Chiquita, McDonald's, Discover Card, and Turkish Airlines. Like The Lego Movie, Lego released a number of building toy sets based on scenes from The Lego Movie 2. Warner Bros. released a Christmas-styled short film, Emmet's Holiday Party, in December 2018. The Lego Movie 2 Videogame was released in February 2019 on multiple platforms.

The Lego Movie 2: The Second Part premiered on February 2, 2019, at the Regency Village Theatre in Los Angeles. It was initially scheduled for release in the United States on May 26, 2017, but was later pushed back to May 25, 2018, then moved up to May 18, 2018, and finally pushed back to February 8, 2019. The film was released one day prior in Denmark.

=== Home media ===
Warner Bros. Home Entertainment released The Lego Movie 2: The Second Part for digital download on April 16, 2019, and on DVD, Blu-ray and 4K formats on May 7. Physical copies contain behind-the-scenes featurettes, audio commentary, deleted scenes, and the short Emmet's Holiday Party.

== Reception ==
=== Box office ===
The Lego Movie 2: The Second Part grossed $105.9 million in the United States and Canada and $93.6 million in other territories, for a worldwide total of $199.6 million. It is considered the franchise's second box-office disappointment, following The Lego Ninjago Movie (2017).

In the United States and Canada, The Lego Movie 2 was released with What Men Want, Cold Pursuit, and The Prodigy on February 8, 2019, and was projected to gross $50–55 million from 4,276 theaters in its opening weekend. However, after making $8.5 million on its first day, including $1.5 million from Thursday night previews, weekend projections were lowered to $31 million. The film debuted earning $34.1 million from 4,303 theaters, finishing first at the box office and making it a higher opening than The Lego Ninjago Movie by 69%, but was lower than The Lego Movie by 50% and The Lego Batman Movie by 35% as well as second-lowest opening of the franchise. Deadline Hollywood attributed the low opening to franchise fatigue due to the release of two spin-offs prior to The Lego Movie 2, as well as Warner Bros. promoting the film using similar marketing tactics from the first film, leading audiences to assume the sequel as derivative and indistinguishable from its predecessor. The Lego Movie 2: The Second Part completed its theatrical run in the United States and Canada on May 9, 2019.

=== Critical response ===
On the review aggregator website Rotten Tomatoes, 84% of 300 critics' reviews are positive, with an average rating of 7/10. The website's critical consensus reads, "While it isn't quite as much fun as its predecessor, The LEGO Movie 2: The Second Part fits neatly into an animated all-ages franchise with heart and humor to spare". On Metacritic, the film has a weighted average score of 65 out of 100, based on 52 critics, indicating "generally favorable reviews". Audiences polled by CinemaScore gave the film an average grade of "A−" on an A+ to F scale (lower than The Lego Movie's "A"), and PostTrak rated it 4 out of 5 stars; social media monitor RelishMix noted their online responses were "great".

Jesse Hassenger of The A.V. Club called the film "lovable", giving it a grade of B and writing "Like Brad Bird's recent Incredibles 2, it follows up a dazzling animated original (all the more dazzling for earning that designation despite being based on a toy line) with some big ideas that don't cohere with the same streamlined magic as its predecessor." Yolanda Machado of TheWrap commended the screenplay and directing and wrote that the film "expands on the original's premise, adding new worlds and characters to the growing LEGO universe, while also crafting a story that is timely, inventive, hilarious and perfect for all ages."

Chris Nashawaty of Entertainment Weekly says that while it was better than most other films, it did not recapture the surprise of the first film, saying "Everything is still awesome. Just a little bit less so." For The Hollywood Reporter, Michael Rechtshaffen wrote that the film brought "little that's fresh or funny to the interlocking brick table despite boasting a script penned by originators Phil Lord and Christopher Miller." Betsy Bozdech of Common Sense Media gave the rating four stars out of five, writing that "It's not quite the lightning in a bottle that its predecessor was, but this entertaining sequel is still definitely better than the average kids' movie."

=== Accolades ===
The Lego Movie 2: The Second Part received nominations for Best Animated/Family Film from the Golden Trailer Awards, the Movieguide Awards (won), the Nickelodeon Kids' Choice Awards, and the People's Choice Awards. Performances of Pratt and Haddish garnered nominations for each Kids' Choice Award, with Pratt for a People Choice Award. At the 3rd Hollywood Critics Association Film Awards, its "Catchy Song" was nominated for Best Original Song. The film was nominated for the Outstanding Visual Effects in an Animated Feature at the 18th Visual Effects Society Awards.

== Future ==
=== Potential sequel ===
Lord and Miller, as well as others involved with the film series, have expressed interest in a sequel as they "are all invested in the films and the characters."

=== Universal Pictures deal ===
Following The Lego Movie 2: The Second Part's disappointing box office returns, Warner Bros. allowed their film rights with Lego to expire by fall 2019. On December 19, 2019, Universal Pictures entered early negotiations with Lego for a new first-look deal. Dan Lin, who produced the previous Lego films for Warner Bros., is expected to remain as a producer through his company Rideback. On April 23, 2020, the deal with Universal was set for a five-year film deal, with plans to include its own franchises and characters in its run of Lego films. While Universal will develop and distribute future Lego films, Warner Bros. retains the rights to the original The Lego Movie characters and properties.

==== Untitled live-action animated Lego film ====
On August 5, 2022, in a podcast interview with The Ankler, Lin revealed that a new Lego film is in development, stating that the new film will be a complete reinvention compared to the previous theatrical Lego films from Warner Bros. and the creative team will "switch it up and take to a different art form that's still true to" the Lego brand. On July 18, 2023, it was announced that Aaron and Adam Nee were attached to direct the film, which was also confirmed to be live-action animated like the previous Lego films from Warner Bros.

==== Piece by Piece ====
On January 26, 2024, it was announced that Universal Pictures and Focus Features would release a Lego film directed by Morgan Neville titled Piece by Piece. The film follows the life and career of American musician Pharrell Williams, who produced and starred in the film, through the lens of Lego animation, or brickfilm. Produced by The Lego Group, Tremolo Productions, I Am Other, Pure Imagination Studios and Tongal, it was released theatrically on October 11, 2024.

==== Various untitled live-action Lego films ====
On October 31, 2024, it was announced that three new Lego films under Universal are in development, each directed by Jake Kasdan, Patty Jenkins, and Joe Cornish. Kasdan's film is based on an original concept by Matt Mider and Kevin Burrows featuring a script by Andrew Mogel and Jarrad Paul. Jenkins is working with Geoff Johns to write the screenplay of her film. Cornish, in turn, is revising a draft by Heather Anne Campbell based on a treatment by Simon Rich. These films were announced to be set in live-action.

==== Untitled live-action Lego Ninjago film ====
On October 31, 2024, the same day when three new Lego films were announced, it was also announced that a live-action film based on the Lego Ninjago theme is in development, with Dan and Kevin Hageman, who wrote the first nine seasons of the original Ninjago television series and co-wrote the story of The Lego Ninjago Movie, attached to pen the script.

==== Inner Child ====
On August 4, 2025, it was announced that a Lego comedy film from Universal titled Inner Child is in development, with James Morosini attached to direct. The project originated as an original speculative screenplay from Morosini that had nothing to do with Lego, and was originally an edgier concept written for live-action. Executives at Universal and the Lego Group are said to have elected to take the material in a direction, visually and otherwise, that befits the Lego brand.
