= Mike Mitchell (director) =

American film director

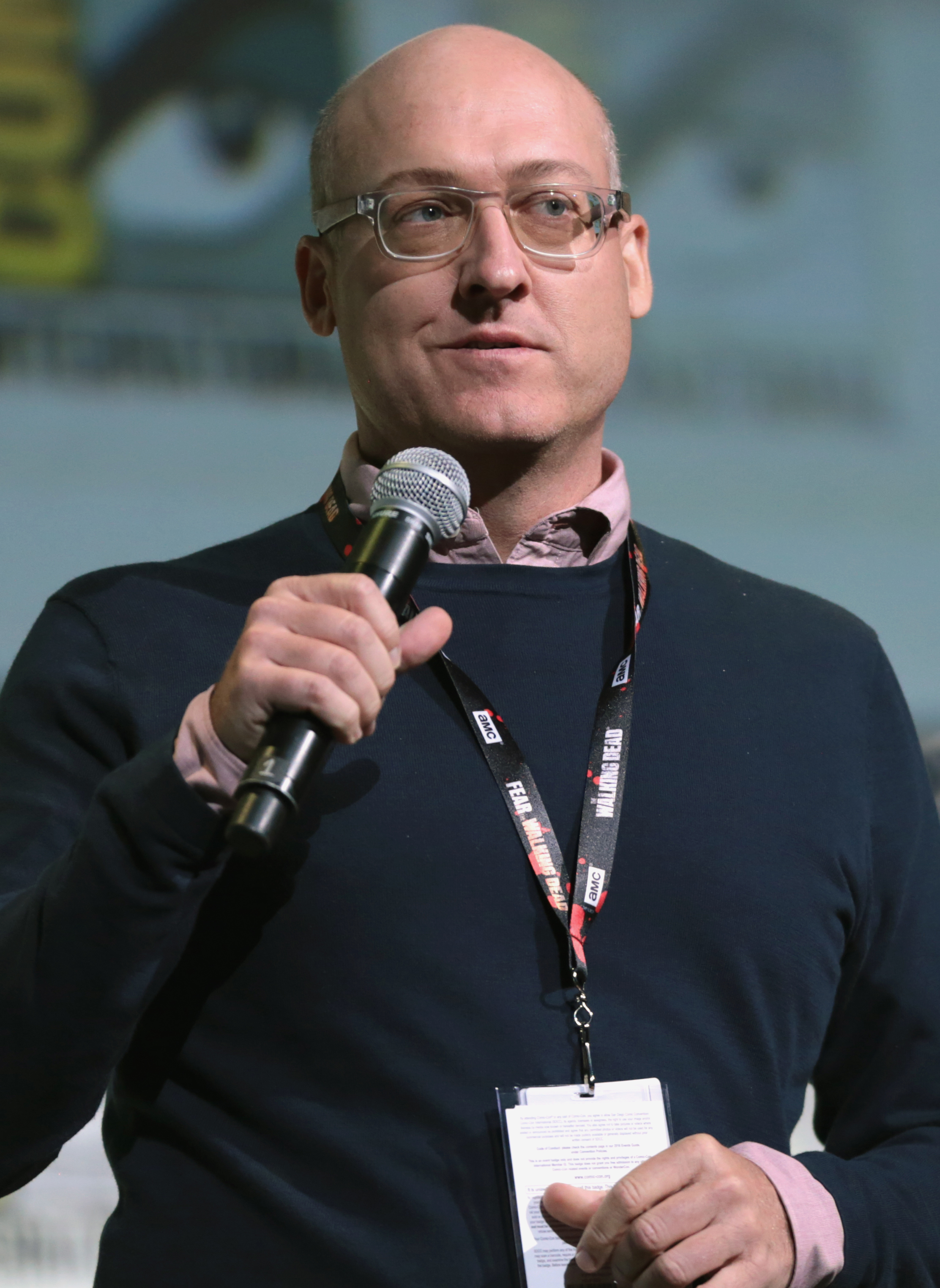
- Mitchell at the 2016 San Diego Comic-Con, promoting Trolls
- Born: Oklahoma City, Oklahoma, U.S.
- Occupations: Film director; writer; producer; actor; animator
- Years active: 1993–present

Mike Mitchell is an American filmmaker, actor and animator. He is known for directing Deuce Bigalow: Male Gigolo (1999), Sky High (2005), Shrek Forever After (2010), Alvin and the Chipmunks: Chipwrecked (2011), Trolls (2016), The Lego Movie 2: The Second Part (2019), and Kung Fu Panda 4 (2024).

== Early life and education ==
Mike Mitchell was born in Oklahoma City, Oklahoma.

He graduated from Putnam City North High School in 1988, then subsequently moved to Los Angeles to attend the California Institute of the Arts.

== Career ==
He started his career as director for Matt O'Callaghan's The Itsy Bitsy Spider. He first gained critical attention when he co-wrote, produced and directed the short film Herd, which won several film festival awards, including the Spirit of Slamdance Award at the 1999 Slamdance Festival. The same year, he made his feature film directorial debut with the comedy Deuce Bigalow: Male Gigolo, starring Rob Schneider. He worked for various companies including Disney, DreamWorks, MTV, Nickelodeon, Universal, and Sony.

He directed the films Alvin and the Chipmunks: Chipwrecked, Surviving Christmas and Sky High. The first two received negative reviews, while the third has received positive reviews. In 2006, he joined DreamWorks Animation, and was a story artist for Shrek the Third and Creative Consultant for Kung Fu Panda. He later directed the movie Shrek Forever After and voiced the character Butterpants.

Mitchell's short film Frannie's Christmas was preserved by the Academy Film Archive in 2012.

He also voiced Advisor Wedgie (known as "Nerd" for most of the film) in Monsters vs. Aliens, and Andy "Jack" Beanstalk in Puss in Boots. He also directed live action sequences on The SpongeBob Movie: Sponge Out of Water. He not only works on movies but in television as well. He directed and wrote several episodes of SpongeBob SquarePants. Mitchell will also direct Nightcrawlers, a supernatural action comedy, a sequel to Sky High, a live-action-animated adaptation of the book We're Not From Here, and a live-action/animated adaptation of the song Puff, the Magic Dragon.

On April 26, 2023, it was announced that Mitchell was set to direct the fourth installment in the Kung Fu Panda franchise, which was released on March 8, 2024.

== Awards ==
- Sundance Film Festival: "Frannie's Christmas" (1993).
- Aspen Shortsfest: 1999: Won special recognition for "Herd" (1999)
- Atlanta Film Festival: 1999: Won Honorable Mention for Best Narrative Short: "Herd" (1999)
- Movieguide Award: 2020: Won Best Movie for Families for The LEGO Movie 2: The Second Part (2019) (with Trisha Gum)

== Filmography ==
=== Film ===
Year	Title	Director	Executive Producer	Story Artist	Writer	Other	Voice Role	Notes
1998	Antz	No	No	Additional	No	No		
1999	Herd	Yes	Producer	No	Yes	Yes		Role Actor: Mailman, and Short Film
1999	Deuce Bigalow: Male Gigolo	Yes	No	No	No	No		directorial debut
2001	Monkeybone	No	No	No	No	Yes	Miss Hudlapp	
2004	Shrek 2	No	No	Additional	No	No		
2004	Surviving Christmas	Yes	No	No	No	No		
2005	Sky High	Yes	No	No	No	No		
2007	Shrek the Third	No	No	Additional	No	No		
2008	Kung Fu Panda	No	No	No	No	Yes		Creative consultant
2009	Monsters vs. Aliens	No	No	Yes	No	Yes	Advisor "Nerd" Wedgie	
2010	Shrek Forever After	Yes	No	No	No	Yes	Tour Guide, Camp Ogre, Ogre Naysayer, Baba Witch, Melty Witch, Witch Guard #2, and Butter Pants	
2010	Megamind	No	No	No	No	Yes	Father in Crowd	
2011	Puss in Boots	No	No	No	No	Yes	Andy Beanstalk	
2011	Alvin and the Chipmunks: Chipwrecked	Yes	No	No	No	No		
2014	Penguins of Madagascar	No	No	No	No	Yes	Antarctic Penguin	
2015	The SpongeBob Movie: Sponge Out of Water	yes	No	No	No	No		Only in Live-action sequences
2016	Kung Fu Panda 3	No	Yes	No	No	Yes	Male Palace Goose / Smart Panda Villager	
2016	Sausage Party	No	No	Additional	No	No		Additional Storyboard Artist
2016	Trolls	Yes	No	No	No	Yes	Darius, Vinny the Phone, Captain Starfunkle, Spider, Wedgie Bergen #1, Chad, and Card	
2019	The Lego Movie 2: The Second Part	Yes	No	No	No	Yes	Guard, Octopus, Harmony Town Citizen, Sherry, and Apocalypseburg Warrior	
2023	Ruby Gillman, Teenage Kraken	No	Yes	No	No	No		
2024	Kung Fu Panda 4	Yes	Yes	No	No	Yes	Tavern Patron #3 / Citizen #3	
2025	Lilo & Stitch	No	No	No	No	Yes	Hammerhead Guard	

=== Television ===
- The Itsy Bitsy Spider (1993)
- Cartoon Sushi (1998)
- Greg the Bunny (2002)
- SpongeBob SquarePants (2005–2007) (live action director, storyboard director and writer)
- The Loop (2007)
- Trolls: The Beat Goes On! (2018–2019) (based on characters created by)
- The Barbarian and the Troll (2021)
