= Superorganism (Superorganism album) =

Studio album by Superorganism
- Released: 2 March 2018
- Genres: Art pop; indie pop; electropop; synth-pop; psychedelic pop
- Length: 33:04
- Label: Domino
- Producer: Superorganism

Superorganism chronology
Superorganism (2018)	World Wide Pop (2022)

Singles from Superorganism
- 1. "Something for Your M.I.N.D." Released: 26 January 2017; 2. "It's All Good" Released: 26 April 2017; 3. "Nobody Cares" Released: 24 May 2017; 4. "Everybody Wants to Be Famous" Released: 2 January 2018; 5. "Reflections on the Screen" Released: 20 February 2018; 6. "Night Time" Released: 1 March 2018; 7. "The Prawn Song" Released: 8 August 2018

Superorganism is the self-titled debut studio album by indie pop band Superorganism, released through Domino on 2 March 2018.

== Background ==
Superorganism only officially formed during the development of this album, having never fully met or performed together previously. The core of the band is made up of all the members of an earlier band, The Eversons – Christopher Young, Mark Turner, Tim Shann and Blair Everson. After a number of releases in their native New Zealand, The Eversons decided to move to London in 2015, setting up home in the shared East London house that still acts as the base for Superorganism. Their music was discovered on YouTube by Japanese high school student Orono Noguchi, who was at that time studying in Maine, USA. She made contact with the band online and struck up a friendship. The band later met up with Noguchi in Japan while touring there.

After a year gigging in London, the members of The Eversons began to lose interest in the style of music they had been playing. "Me and some of the guys in the band had tried in vain to record a garage rock album," recalls Harry, "and by the end of that process, we came home and we were just like, 'We don't want to play loud guitars and drums in a room any more'. So we went back to the drawing board and said, 'What can we do that'll be more fresh and fun?'".

By late 2016, they had begun work on the track "Something for your M.I.N.D", using a vocal sample from "The Realm" by C’hantal as the chorus hook. On 6 January Mark Turner sent a Facebook message to Noguchi with a link to some rough demos, including "Something for your M.I.N.D.". In the message, Turner explained that the band wanted to start a new recording project named Superorganism and invited Noguchi to join as a singer.

== Recording and production ==
Noguchi decided to accept the band's invitation and immediately began work on writing lyrics and recording vocals for the verses in "Something For Your M.I.N.D.". Noguchi states that she had completed writing and recording her vocal part and sent it back to Turner within one or two hours. The vocals were recorded in Noguchi's school dorm room directly into her MacBook using GarageBand while her roommate was in the bathroom.

Some of The Eversons' other musician friends from New Zealand - Soul, Ruby and B, were then recruited to the band to provide backing vocals. Soul's real name is Earl Ho, he had previously created psychedelic music as the vocalist in the New Zealand band Sherpa. He had moved to London in 2014, hoping to promote Sherpa's music and be closer to his girlfriend who lived in Amsterdam.

All of the band members except Noguchi decided to adopt pseudonyms in order to maintain some mystery about their identities. Chris took on the name ‘Harry’, Blair became ‘Robert Strange’, Tim changed to ‘Toucan’ and Mark renamed himself ‘Emily’, possibly in reference to The Eversons song of the same name.

After the internet release and subsequent viral success of "Something For Your M.I.N.D." at the end of January 2017, the band continued to use the same approach to create the rest of the tracks that would make up the album. Each track would be started individually by one member then shared with the rest of the band via Facebook or WhatsApp, allowing them to layer on their own ideas and contributions. "We’ve got the guy making the videos downstairs, mixing in the other room, singing going on [elsewhere]," Harry explains. "We’ve created this kind of warped version of a pop production house." Noguchi returned to Japan after graduating from high school and continued to submit her vocal contributions over the internet until moving to London to live with the rest of the band in July 2017.

Recording and mixing for the album was completed in August 2017, after which Superorganism signed a worldwide record deal with Domino Records in September 2017. The band were advised by Domino to limit the track listing to ten, meaning some completed tracks were not included on the album.

== Music ==
The album features a mix of traditional instruments (drums, guitar, bass), synthesisers, and samples. Regarding samples, Noguchi stated, "It's a good mix of everything. Sometimes we use field recordings. Sometimes we use royalty free sound effects websites. And sometimes we're looking for specific audio clips, so we look for that on YouTube".

The band have referenced an eclectic range of influences on their musical style, including Mark Mothersbaugh, Pavement, Katy Perry, Weezer, Daft Punk, and Kanye West.

== Reception ==
Professional ratings
Aggregate scores
Source	Rating
AnyDecentMusic?	6.8/10
Metacritic	73/100
Review scores
Source	Rating
AllMusic	4/5 stars
Consequence of Sound	B+
Exclaim!	9/10
The Guardian	3/5 stars
Mojo	3/5 stars
NME	3/5 stars
Pitchfork	7.8/10
Q	3/5 stars
Uncut	8/10
Vice	A−

The album has received a Metacritic score of 73 based on 19 reviews, indicating generally favorable reviews.

== Track listing ==
All tracks written, performed, recorded and mixed by Superorganism, except "Something for Your M.I.N.D.", written by Ralphie Dee, Anthony Mannino, Dennis Pino, and Superorganism.

No.	Title	Length
1.	"It's All Good"	3:24
2.	"Everybody Wants to Be Famous"	3:05
3.	"Nobody Cares"	3:49
4.	"Reflections on the Screen"	3:52
5.	"SPRORGNSM"	3:20
6.	"Something for Your M.I.N.D."	2:45
7.	"Nai's March"	2:40
8.	"The Prawn Song"	3:16
9.	"Relax"	2:43
10.	"Night Time"	4:14
Total length:		33:04

Japanese bonus tracks
No.	Title	Length
11.	"Something for Your M.I.N.D." (Joe Goddard Remix)	7:01
12.	"Something for Your M.I.N.D." (el_der remix)	3:12
Total length:		43:24

Sample credits

- "Something for Your M.I.N.D." incorporates lyrics and elements, and contains a sample, from "The Realm", written by Ralph d’Agostino, Dennis Pino, and Anthony Mannino, and performed by C'hantal.

== Charts ==
Chart (2018)	Peak position
Australian Albums (ARIA)	56
Belgian Albums (Ultratop Flanders)	86
Belgian Albums (Ultratop Wallonia)	116
Dutch Albums (Album Top 100)	89
Japanese Albums (Oricon)	145
New Zealand Artist Albums (RMNZ)	8
New Zealand Heatseeker Albums (RMNZ)	4
Scottish Albums (Official Charts)	19
UK Albums (Official Charts)	25
