= Superorganism (band) =

English indie pop band

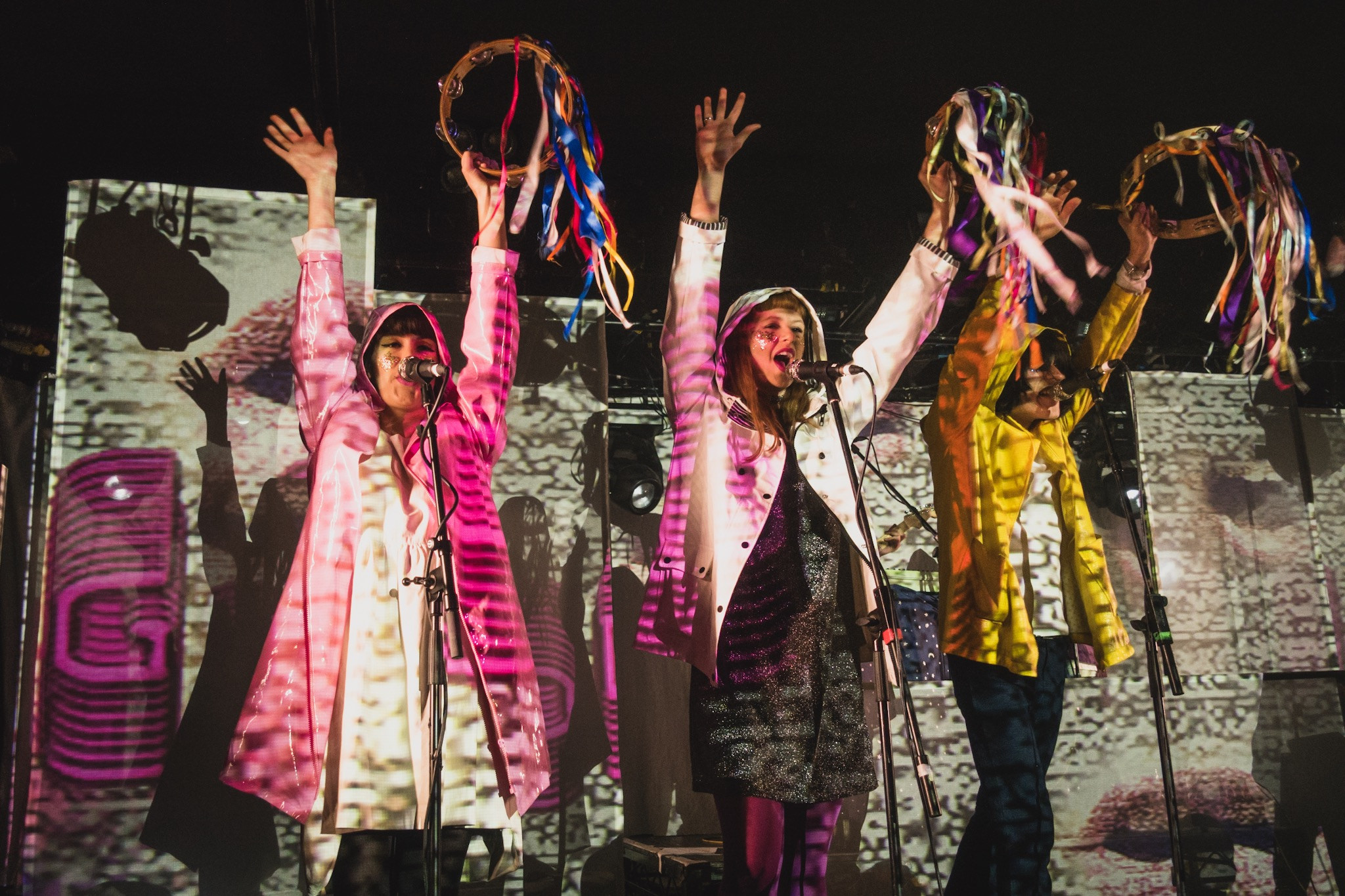
- Superorganism performing in 2018. From left to right: B, Ruby, and Soul.

Background information
- Origin: London, England
- Genres: Art pop; indie pop; electropop; synth-pop; psychedelic pop
- Years active: 2017–present
- Labels: Domino; Hostess (Japan)
- Spinoff of: The Eversons
- Members: Orono Noguchi; Harry; Tucan; B; Soul
- Past members: Emily; Ruby; Robert Strange
- Website: www.wearesuperorganism.com

Superorganism are an indie pop band based in London, formed in early 2017. The group originally consisted of eight members: lead vocalist Orono Noguchi, as well as Mark Turner ("Emily"), Christopher Young ("Harry"), Tim Shann ("Tucan"), Blair Everson ("Robert Strange"), "Ruby", "B", and Earl Ho ("Soul").

Many of the group's members originally met online before forming the group, while four of their members previously performed together as the Eversons. Their self-titled debut album, Superorganism, was released on 2 March 2018 through Domino Recording Company and Hostess Entertainment.

== Career ==
Superorganism's whale logo

Superorganism initially started as a casual recording project with members based in multiple countries across the United Kingdom, the United States, and Australia. Most of the members of Superorganism had met online in music forums and via mutual friends over a number of years. At the time of Superorganism's formation, the majority of the members had been living in London since 2015 and decided to embark on a musical project together.

Four of the members – Mark Turner (Emily), Christopher Young (Harry), Timothy "Tim" Shann (Tucan), and Blair Everson (Robert Strange), had previously met Orono Noguchi when they were touring Japan in another band called the Eversons. Noguchi, at the time a high school student from Maine, had first discovered the Eversons via her YouTube recommendations, thereafter becoming a fan of the group. During a 2015 summer trip to Japan, Noguchi found the Eversons to be performing a gig nearby and attended. They became friends, bonding over their shared interest in internet memes.

External videos
- Example of Soul participating in interviews while living separately

After discovering Noguchi could sing (she had been regularly posting covers on SoundCloud), the group sent a message to Noguchi, asking if she wanted to add lyrics and vocals to a demo they had been working on at the beginning of 2017. Collaborating on their project remotely, Noguchi received a GarageBand instrumental file and sent back to the band her deadpan vocals recorded using the built-in microphone of her MacBook laptop. The demo came to be Superorganism's first single "Something For Your M.I.N.D.", which was later featured on the soundtrack of FIFA 18. It also featured during the season three premiere of Legion, in which the band portrayed themselves.

After graduating from John Bapst Memorial High School in June, seventeen-year-old Noguchi relocated to London. "Ever since I was little I had two big goals", says Noguchi, "One of them was to be a musician or an artist of some sort, and the other was to go to college in the States. That’s why I made the decision to go to Maine by myself when I was fourteen." In regards to college, she said, "[Forming Superorganism] was a really big decision but you don’t get to decide when opportunities come. So I'll do this, and I can go to college any time I want."

Robert Strange was Superorganism's original visual artist. As of late 2017, seven out of eight band members lived together in a large terraced house in the East End of London that doubles as a 24-hour studio. South Korean-New Zealander Soul (Earl Ho), is the only member to live apart from the group, residing in Sydney, Australia. An enlarged image of Soul's face often takes his place in group photographs. Going by the project name "CHI", Soul has also released material to a Bandcamp account of his own, playing the guitar and keyboard himself.

In June 2018, Superorganism covered Hikaru Utada's "Pakchi no Uta" (パクチーの唄; "Coriander Song") as promotion for the release of her album Hatsukoi (2018).

In October 2018, Superorganism embarked on a tour of the UK and Ireland with Japanese band Chai as their support.

In January 2019, the Eversons were dumped from their record label, Lil' Chief Records, due to allegations dating from 2012 against Mark Turner (Emily), that "became common knowledge among the New Zealand indie music scene." The label released a statement saying they were against sexual misconduct and apologised unreservedly for not acting sooner. Some songs by the Eversons were controversial in New Zealand for their misogynistic and offensive content.

Superorganism contributed the song "Hello Me & You" to the soundtrack of the film The Lego Movie 2: The Second Part, released in February 2019.

On 7 March 2022, Superorganism announced their second studio album, World Wide Pop, with a 15 July release date, alongside the release of the single "Teenager". It was also announced that Ruby, Turner and Robert Strange had left the band.

In September 2024, while discussing her side project, cheese touch, Noguchi said Superorganism was "still kind of going, but it's kind of taking a break."

== Members ==
Current members

- Orono Noguchi, also known as "OJ" – lead vocals, guitars, writing, painting (2017–present)
- Tucan, or Dr. Tucan Taylor Michaels (Timothy "Tim" Shann) – drums, percussion, writing, production, mixing (2017–present)
- Harry (Christopher Young) – guitars, writing, production (2017–present)
- B – backing vocals, dancing, percussion (2017–present)
- Soul (Earl Ho) – backing vocals, dancing, percussion, fife (2017–present)

Former members

- Emily (Mark David Turner) – keyboards, synthesizers, writing, production (2017–2022)
- Ruby – backing vocals, dancing, percussion (2017–2022)
- Robert Strange (Blair Everson) – visual arts, staging (2017–2022)

== Discography ==
=== Albums ===
List of studio albums, with selected chart positions
| Title | Album details | Peak chart positions | | | | | | | | |
| Title | Album details | AUS | BEL (FL) | BEL (WA) | JPN Oricon | NLD | NZ Heat. | SCO | UK | US Heat. |
|---|---|---|---|---|---|---|---|---|---|---|
| Superorganism | Released: 2 March 2018; Label: Domino, Hostess; Format: CD, LP, cassette, digital download | 56 | 86 | 116 | 145 | 89 | 4 | 19 | 25 | 4 |
| World Wide Pop | Released: 15 July 2022; Label: Domino; Format: CD, LP, cassette, digital download | — | — | — | 57 | — | — | 50 | 99 | — |

=== Singles ===
List of singles as lead artist, with selected chart positions
| Title | Year | Chart positions | | | | | Album |
| Title | Year | BEL (WA) | JPN | JPN Over. | MEX Air. | US Alt. | Album |
|---|---|---|---|---|---|---|---|
| "Something for Your M.I.N.D." | 2017 | — | — | — | — | — | Superorganism |
| "It's All Good" | 2017 | — | — | — | — | — | Superorganism |
| "Nobody Cares" | 2017 | — | — | — | — | — | Superorganism |
| "Everybody Wants to Be Famous" | 2018 | 25 | 83 | 6 | 11 | 29 | Superorganism |
| "Reflections on the Screen" | 2018 | — | — | — | — | — | Superorganism |
| "Night Time" | 2018 | — | — | — | 45 | — | Superorganism |
| "The Prawn Song" | 2018 | — | — | — | — | — | Superorganism |
| "Teenager" (featuring Chai and Pi Ja Ma) | 2022 | — | — | — | — | — | World Wide Pop |
| "It's Raining" (featuring Stephen Malkmus and Dylan Cartlidge) | 2022 | — | — | — | — | — | World Wide Pop |
| "crushed.zip" | 2022 | — | — | — | — | — | World Wide Pop |
| "On & On" | 2022 | — | — | — | — | — | World Wide Pop |
| "Woofin' and Meowin'" | 2022 | — | — | 20 | — | — | HouseBroken |
"—" denotes a title that did not chart or was not released.

List of singles as featured artist, with selected chart positions
| Title | Year | Chart positions | Album |
| Title | Year | JPN | Album |
|---|---|---|---|
| "Same Thing" (Gen Hoshino featuring Superorganism) | 2019 | 36 | Same Thing |

=== Music videos ===
| Title | Year | Album |
|---|---|---|
| "It's All Good" | 2017 | Superorganism |
| "Nobody Cares" | 2017 | Superorganism |
| "Something for Your M.I.N.D." | 2017 | Superorganism |
| "Everybody Wants to Be Famous" | 2018 | Superorganism |
| "Reflections on the Screen" | 2018 | Superorganism |
| "Night Time" | 2018 | Superorganism |
| "The Prawn Song" | 2018 | Superorganism |
| "Teenager" | 2022 | World Wide Pop |
| "It's Raining" | 2022 | World Wide Pop |
| "crushed.zip" | 2022 | World Wide Pop |
| "On & On" | 2022 | World Wide Pop |
| "Into The Sun" | 2022 | World Wide Pop |
| "Solar System" | 2022 | World Wide Pop |

== Awards and nominations ==
| Year | Award | Category | Nominated work | Result | Ref. |
|---|---|---|---|---|---|
| 2018 | MTV Europe Music Awards | Best Push | Superorganism | Nominated | |
| 2019 | Sweden GAFFA Awards | Best Foreign New Act | Superorganism | Nominated | |
