= Jon Lajoie =

Canadian comedian, actor, and singer (born 1980)

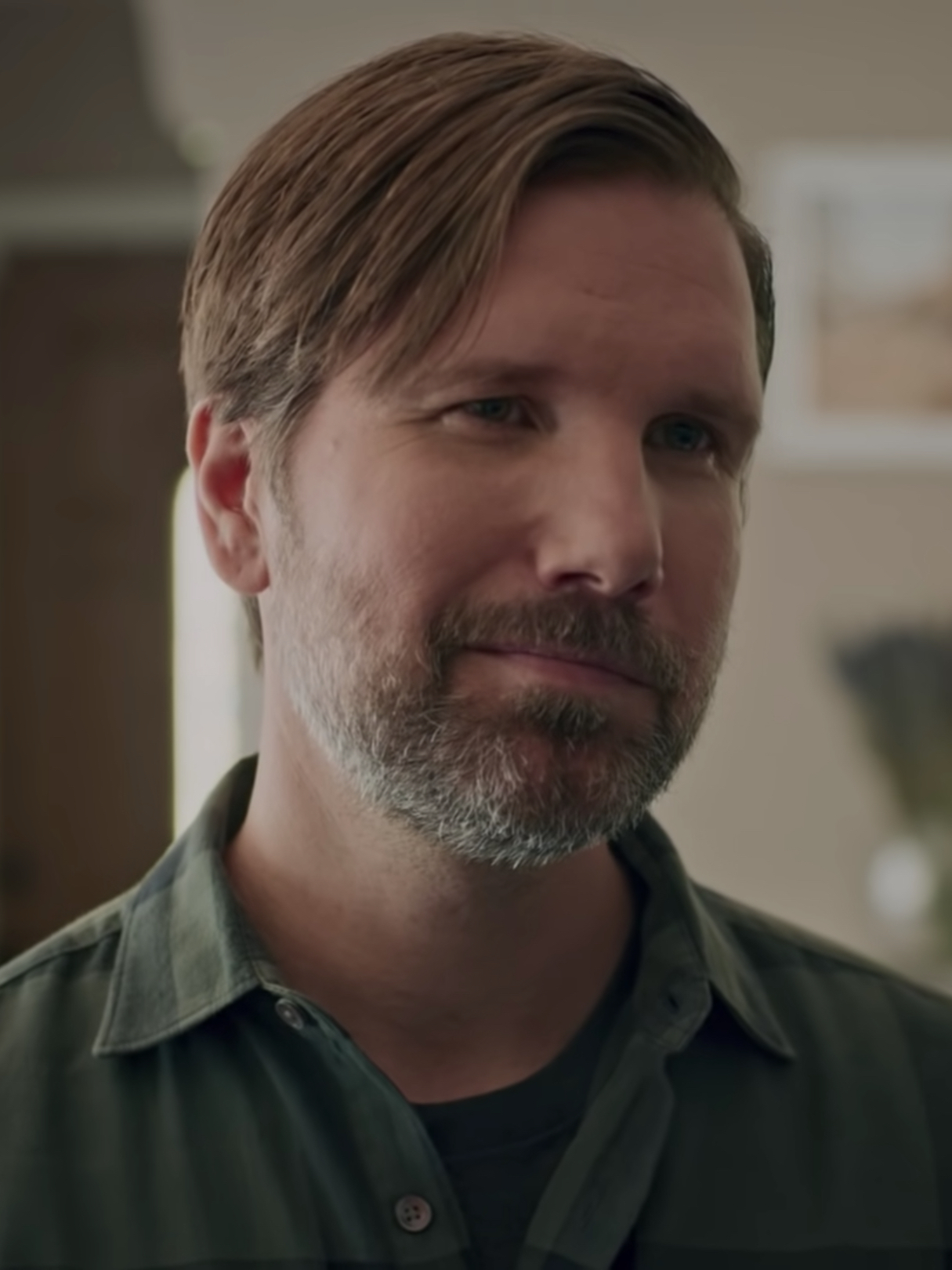
- Jon Lajoie in 2021

Background information
- Also known as: Wolfie's Just Fine
- Born: Jonathan Lajoie; August 21, 1980 (age 46); Longueuil, Quebec, Canada
- Origin: Montreal, Quebec, Canada
- Genres: Comedy; hip hop; indie folk
- Occupations: Comedian; rapper; actor; singer; songwriter; record producer; director
- Instruments: Vocals; guitar; drums; sequencer
- Years active: 2003–present
- Label: Normal Guy Productions
- Website: www.jonlajoie.com

Jonathan Lajoie (/ləˈʒwɑː/ lə-ZHWAH; born August 21, 1980) is a Canadian comedian, actor and musician. He gained fame from his YouTube channel, posting comedic original songs (often as rapper characters, such as "Everyday Normal Guy" and "MC Vagina") and comedy skits. Lajoie is also known for his role as Taco MacArthur on the FXX comedy series The League. Since 2016, he has released indie folk music under the moniker Wolfie's Just Fine, and has also contributed original music to TV shows and films.

== Early life ==
Lajoie was born in Longueuil, Quebec, Canada and raised on the South Shore of Montreal. His father was Québécois and his mother is English-Canadian, and he is the third of nine children. Lajoie had formative experiences with music while attending a Pentecostal church and taking lessons. He graduated from Dawson College on the Island of Montreal. He completed a professional theatre program in 2002, after which he played in a band in the Montreal area for three years.

== Career ==
From 2003 to 2017, Lajoie portrayed an English-Canadian musician named Thomas Edison in Radio-Canada's French-language television series L'Auberge du chien noir. Lajoie began his career as a comedy musician in 2006. His performances include music, skits, and some comedy. Jon Lajoie has also released four studio albums, the first two featuring comedy music. His third and fourth albums eschewed comedy and were released under the moniker 'Wolfie's Just Fine'.

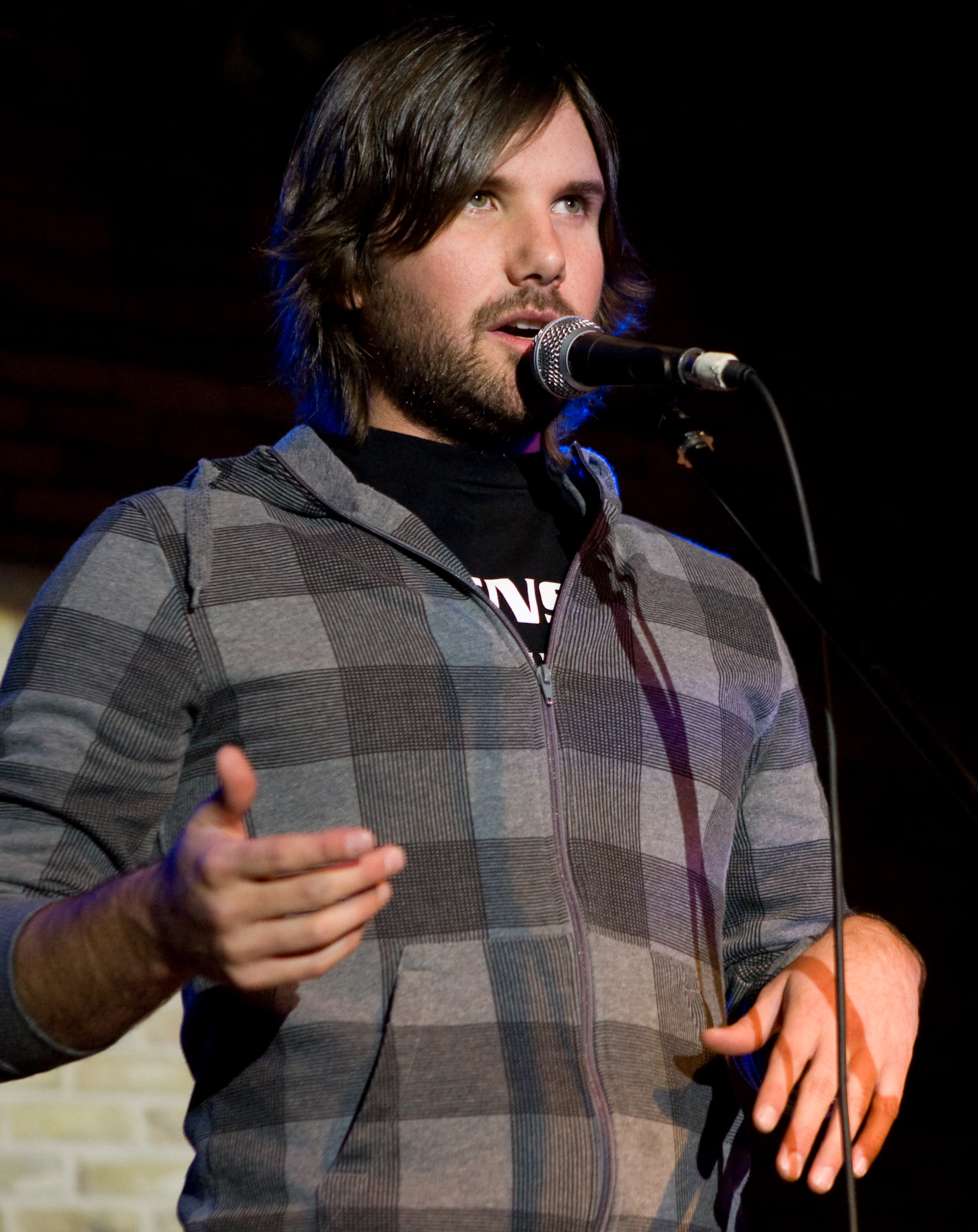
Lajoie in 2008

=== Television ===
Lajoie was cast in the FXX TV show The League as Taco MacArthur, a perpetually stoned and unemployed musician. Throughout the series, Lajoie performed songs written for the show.

He guest-starred as Caleb95 in one episode of the Williams Street original television show NTSF:SD:SUV::. In February 2022, LaJoie was featured in the Canadian edition of Amazon Prime's comedy competition LOL: Last One Laughing alongside Tom Green, Colin Mochrie, and Dave Foley among others.

=== Comedy Central Presents ===
Lajoie filmed an episode of Comedy Central Presents on November 7, 2009. It premiered on March 5, 2010. The same special aired uncensored as part of Comedy Central's Secret Stash on June 6 featuring the world premiere of the video for his song "Pop Song".

=== Film ===
Lajoie was featured in the 2014 movie Let's Be Cops, as the boss of Damon Wayans, Jr.'s character. He was also featured in Quentin Dupieux's 2013 movie Wrong Cops as Officer Regan.

=== Music ===
Lajoie has published several novelty songs that he has made available on websites such as Funny or Die and YouTube. Though he initially hesitated to release a "serious album" due to his reputation as a comedic actor, in 2016, Lajoie released his first project of non-comedic music under the moniker Wolfie's Just Fine (whose name is a reference to Terminator 2: Judgment Day). The 10 track indie folk album titled I Remembered but Then I Forgot, released on April 8, was produced by Joe Corcoran and mixed by Phil Ek. The themes of the album predominantly draw on and recount Lajoie's formative childhood experiences. The song "A New Beginning" was inspired by Lajoie's experience watching his first horror movie Friday the 13th: A New Beginning, whose music video (directed by Lajoie and Brandon Dermer) is a tribute to the film by way of a shot-for-shot remake of a particularly impactful scene.

In 2018, Lajoie followed up with a Wolfie's Just Fine EP titled Perfection, Nevada, which was produced by Bright Eyes' Mike Mogis. Released on June 22, the release explores coming of age themes and features references to nineties films. Lajoie co-directed a music video for the single "Break My Back" featuring actor Xander Berkeley, as well as "Trying to Sleep" which pays homage to the film Tremors.

==== Songwriting for film and TV ====
LaJoie made his first foray into writing songs for film and television with his contributions to The League, for which he wrote and performed 14 songs over the course of the show.

In 2019, Lajoie wrote five songs for Warner Bros.' The Lego Movie 2: The Second Part, including "Catchy Song" (produced by Dillon Francis) and "Not Evil".

In 2022, Lajoie wrote three songs for the third episode of The Afterparty, with lyrical contributions by Jack Dolgen.

== Filmography ==
=== Film ===
Year	Title	Role	Notes
2012	Wrong Cops: Chapter 1	MC Vagina	Short film
2013	Wrong Cops	Officer Regan	
2014	Let's Be Cops	Todd Connors	
2016	Moments of Clarity	Carter	
2020	Wish Upon a Unicorn	Louis Dindal	

=== Television ===
Year	Title	Role	Notes
2003–2019	L'Auberge du chien noir	Thomas Edison	
2009–2015	The League	Taco MacArthur	84 episodes
2013	NTSF:SD:SUV::	Caleb95	Episode: "A Hard Drive to Swallow"
2014	Kroll Show	Jon Lajoie	Episode: "Banff Is on Fire"
2022	Transformers: BotBots	Pizza Prime	1 Episode
2022	LOL: Last One Laughing Canada	Himself	

== Discography ==
=== Studio albums ===
Title	Details
You Want Some of This?	Release date: January 30, 2009; Label: Normal Guy Productions; Formats: CD, music download
I Kill People	Release date: November 15, 2010; Label: Normal Guy Productions; Formats: CD, music download
I Remembered, But Then I Forgot (as Wolfie's Just Fine)	Release date: April 8, 2016; Label: Normal Guy Productions; Formats: CD, music download
Everyone Is Dead Except Us (as Wolfie's Just Fine)	Release date: June 16, 2023; Label: Normal Guy Productions; Formats: CD, music download

=== EPs ===
Title	Details
Perfection, Nevada (as Wolfie's Just Fine)	Release date: June 22, 2018; Label: Normal Guy Productions; Formats: CD, music download

=== Singles ===
as Jon Lajoie

- "High as Fuck" (2008)
- "Show Me Your Genitals" (2008)
- "I'm Inside Me!" (2010)
- "Very Super Famous" (2011)
- "The Best Song" (2011)
- "F**k Everything" (2011)
- "WTF Collective 3" (2011)
- "Drinking Beer and Smoking Cigarettes" (2012)
- "Song for the Students" (2012)
- "Broken-Hearted" (2012)
- "The Best Christmas Song" (2012)
- "Started as a Baby" (2013)
- "Miley, You're a Good Girl" (2013)
- "Merry Christmas Exclamation Point" (2013)
- "Please Use This Song" (2014)
- "One Thing" (2021)

as Wolfie's Just Fine

- "It's a Job" (2016)
- "I Forgot" (2016)
- "A Song for the Election" (2016)
- "Break My Back" (2018)
- "Save the World" (2018)
- "Everyone is Dead Except Us" (2023)
- "Hulk Hogan Slammed Andre the Giant" (2023)

=== Certifications ===
Title	Year	Certifications	Album
"Everyday Normal Guy 2"	2008	RMNZ: Gold	Dance Gavin Dance

=== Music videos ===
Year	Song title	Director(s)	Album	YouTube release date
2007	"High as Fuck"	Unknown	You Want Some of This?	October 1, 2007
2007	"2 Girls 1 Cup Song"	Unknown	You Want Some of This?	November 1, 2007
2007	"Everyday Normal Guy"	Unknown	You Want Some of This?	November 21, 2007
2007	"Cold Blooded Christmas"	Unknown	You Want Some of This?	December 10, 2007
2008	"Why Did You Leave Me?"	Unknown	You Want Some of This?	January 8, 2008
2008	"Everyday Normal Guy 2"	Unknown	You Want Some of This?	January 16, 2008
2008	"Song for Britney"	Unknown	You Want Some of This?	February 4, 2008
2008	"Sunday Afternoon"	Unknown	You Want Some of This?	March 11, 2008
2008	"Show Me Your Genitals"	Unknown	You Want Some of This?	May 31, 2008
2008	"Stay at Home Dad"	Unknown	You Want Some of This?	August 21, 2008
2008	"Show Me Your Genitals 2: E=MC Vagina"	Unknown	You Want Some of This?	September 5, 2008
2008	Bootlegs & B-Sides (including "I Don't Understand" and "Potty Training Song")	Unknown	You Want Some of This?	October 11, 2008
2008	"Too Fast"	Unknown	You Want Some of This?	November 17, 2008
2009	"Everyday Normal Crew"	Unknown	You Want Some of This?	January 5, 2009
2009	"Alone in the Universe"	Unknown	I Kill People	March 8, 2009
2009	"I Kill People"	Unknown	I Kill People	April 23, 2009
2009	"Michael Jackson Is Dead"	Unknown	I Kill People	June 26, 2009
2009	"Radio Friendly Song"	Unknown	I Kill People	August 27, 2009
2009	"WTF Collective"	Unknown	I Kill People	October 5, 2009
2010	"Chatroulette Song"	Unknown	I Kill People	March 26, 2010
2010	"I Can Dance"	Unknown	I Kill People	April 19, 2010
2010	"Blackbird" (The Beatles parody)	Unknown	Non-album song	May 31, 2010
2010	"Pop Song"	Julien Demers-Arsenault	You Want Some of This?	June 5, 2010
2010	"Mel Gibson's Love Song"	Unknown	I Kill People	July 5, 2010
2010	"WTF Collective 2"	Unknown	I Kill People	November 16, 2010
2010	"In Different Ways"	Julien Demers-Arsenault	I Kill People	December 18, 2010
2011	"Very Super Famous"	Unknown	"Very Super Famous" single	February 15, 2011
2011	"Osama Is Dead"	Unknown	Non-album song	May 2, 2011
2011	"The Best Song"	Unknown	"The Best Song" single	June 21, 2011
2011	"Fuck Everything"	Jon Lajoie	"Fuck Everything" single	July 29, 2011
2011	"WTF Collective 3"	Jon Lajoie	"WTF Collective 3" single	December 5, 2011
2011	"Sexpenze Commercial"	Jon Lajoie & Brandon Dermer	Non-album song	December 30, 2011
2012	"Broken-Hearted"	Jon Lajoie	"Broken-Hearted" single	July 23, 2012
2012	"The Prank War"	Jon Lajoie & Brandon Dermer	Non-album song	August 27, 2012
2012	"Jon Lajoie on Marriage Equality"	Jon Lajoie	Non-album song	October 23, 2012
2012	"The Best Christmas Song"	Jon Lajoie	"The Best Christmas Song" single	November 28, 2012
2013	"Started as a Baby"	Jon Lajoie	"Started as a Baby" single	April 23, 2013
2013	"Jon Lajoie's Kickstarter"	Jon Lajoie	"Jon Lajoie's Kickstarter" single	May 28, 2013
2013	"Merry Christmas Exclamation Point"	Jon Lajoie	"Merry Christmas Exclamation Point" single	December 12, 2013
2014	"Please Use This Song"	Jon Lajoie	"Please Use This Song" single	April 30, 2014
2014	"Commercial Actors Mingle"	Jon Lajoie	"Commercial Actors Mingle" single	May 28, 2014
2016	"It's a Job" (as "Wolfie's Just Fine")	Jon Lajoie & Brandon Dermer	I Remembered but Then I Forgot	March 2, 2016
2016	"A New Beginning" (as "Wolfie's Just Fine")	Jon Lajoie & Brandon Dermer	I Remembered but Then I Forgot	June 27, 2016
2018	"Break My Back" (as "Wolfie's Just Fine")	Jon Lajoie & Brandon Dermer	Perfection, Nevada	May 18, 2018
2023	"Everyone Is Dead Except Us" (as "Wolfie's Just Fine")	Jon Lajoie	Everyone Is Dead Except Us	April 13, 2023
2023	"Hulk Hogan Slammed Andre the Giant" (as "Wolfie's Just Fine")	Jon Lajoie	Everyone is Dead Except Us	May 18, 2023
