= Timbaland discography =

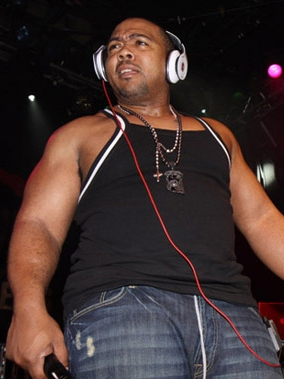
- Timbaland performing in 2010
- Studio albums: 4
- Mixtapes: 2
- Singles: 57
- Music videos: 27

American record producer, rapper, singer and songwriter Timbaland has released 4 studio albums, 2 mixtapes, 57 singles (including 34 as a featured artist) and 27 music videos.

== Albums ==
=== Studio albums ===
List of albums, with selected chart positions and certifications
Title	Album details	Peak chart positions										Certifications
Title	Album details	US	AUS	AUT	CAN	GER	IRL	NL	NZ	SWI	UK	Certifications
Tim's Bio: Life from da Bassment	Released: November 24, 1998 (US); Label: Blackground, Atlantic; Format: CD, LP, cassette, digital download	41	—	—	—	—	—	85	—	—	—	
Shock Value	Released: April 3, 2007 (US); Label: Blackground, Mosley Music Group; Format: CD, LP, digital download	5	1	1	2	5	1	9	4	5	2	RIAA: Platinum; ARIA: 3× Platinum; BPI: 3× Platinum; BVMI: Platinum; IFPI AUT: Gold; IFPI SWI: Platinum; IRMA: 3× Platinum; MC: 3× Platinum; RMNZ: 2× Platinum
Shock Value II	Released: December 8, 2009 (US); Label: Blackground, Mosley Music Group; Format: CD, LP, digital download	36	35	23	16	15	23	37	36	5	25	BPI: Gold; BVMI: Gold; IFPI SWI: Gold; MC: Platinum
Timbo Progression	Released: March 28, 2025; Label: Mosley / gamma; Format: Digital download, streaming	—	—	—	—	—	—	—	—	—	—	
"—" denotes a recording that did not chart or was not released in that territory.

=== Collaborative albums ===
List of collaborative albums, with selected details
Title	Details
SEVEN TRUMPETS (with 1K Phew)	Released: October 30, 2026; Label: Reach; Format: Digital download, streaming

=== Mixtapes ===
List of mixtapes, with selected details
Title	Details
King Stays King	Released: December 25, 2015; Label: Self-released; Formats: Digital download
Drop	Released: August 19, 2018; Label: Self-released; Formats: Digital download
Resurrection (with Chlöe)	Released: June 19, 2026; Label: Parkwood, Columbia; Format: Digital download, streaming

=== Meditation albums ===
List of meditation albums, with selected details
Title	Details
Yellow (with Malte Marten)	Released: December 5, 2024; Label: Real Music; Formats: Digital download

== Singles ==
=== As lead artist ===
List of singles as lead artist, with selected chart positions and certifications, showing year released and album name
Title	Year	Peak chart positions										Certifications	Album
Title	Year	US	AUS	AUT	CAN	GER	IRL	NL	NZ	SWI	UK	Certifications	Album
"Here We Come" (featuring Magoo, Missy Elliott and Darryl Pearson)	1998	92	—	—	—	—	—	33	—	—	43		Tim's Bio: Life from da Bassment
"Keep It Real" (featuring Ginuwine)	1999	—	—	—	—	—	—	—	—	—	—		Tim's Bio: Life from da Bassment
"Lobster & Scrimp" (featuring Jay-Z)	1999	—	—	—	—	—	—	—	—	—	48		Tim's Bio: Life from da Bassment
"Can't Nobody" (featuring 1 Life 2 Live)	1999	—	—	—	—	—	—	—	—	—	—		Tim's Bio: Life from da Bassment
"Give It to Me" (featuring Nelly Furtado and Justin Timberlake)	2007	1	16	3	2	3	2	8	2	6	1	RIAA: 3× Platinum; BPI: Platinum; BVMI: 3× Gold; IFPI SWI: Platinum; MC: Platinum; RMNZ: 2× Platinum	Shock Value
"The Way I Are" (featuring Keri Hilson and D.O.E.)	2007	3	1	4	1	5	1	4	2	3	1	RIAA: 3× Platinum; ARIA: Platinum; BPI: 3× Platinum; BVMI: 5× Gold; IFPI SWI: Platinum; MC: 3× Platinum; RMNZ: 6× Platinum	Shock Value
"Apologize" (with OneRepublic)	2007	2	1	1	1	1	2	2	1	1	3	RIAA: 5× Platinum; ARIA: 11× Platinum; BPI: 2× Platinum; BVMI: 9× Gold; IFPI SWI: 3× Platinum; MC: 5× Platinum; RMNZ: 4× Platinum	Shock Value
"Scream" (featuring Keri Hilson and Nicole Scherzinger)	2007	— (Note: "Scream" did not enter the US Billboard Hot 100 Singles Chart, but peaked at number 22 on the Billboard Hot Bubbling Under Chart.)	20	18	41	9	10	16	9	45	12	BPI: Silver	Shock Value
"Morning After Dark" (featuring Nelly Furtado and SoShy)	2009	61	19	12	8	6	11	17	—	20	6	ARIA: Gold; BPI: Silver; BVMI: Gold	Shock Value II
"Say Something" (featuring Drake)	2009	23	—	—	—	—	—	—	—	—	—		Shock Value II
"Carry Out" (featuring Justin Timberlake)	2009	11	58	57	7	42	3	37	15	80	6	BPI: Platinum; MC: Platinum; RMNZ: Platinum	Shock Value II
"If We Ever Meet Again" (featuring Katy Perry)	2009	37	9	10	4	9	3	27	1	7	3	ARIA: Platinum; BPI: Platinum; BVMI: Gold; IFPI SWI: Gold; MC: 2× Platinum; RMNZ: 3× Platinum	Shock Value II
"Pass at Me" (featuring Pitbull)	2011	— (Note: "Pass at Me" did not enter the Billboard Hot 100, but peaked at number four on the Bubbling Under Hot 100 chart.)	61	—	—	27	37	—	—	—	40		Non-album single
"Hands in the Air" (featuring Ne-Yo)	2012	— (Note: "Hands in the Air" did not enter the Billboard Hot 100, but peaked at number two on the Bubbling Under Hot 100 chart.)	56	38	88	37	—	—	—	26	—		Step Up Revolution (soundtrack)
"Keep Going Up" (with Nelly Furtado and Justin Timberlake)	2023	84	— (Note: "Keep Going Up" peaked at number 17 on the Australia Airplay (AirCheck) Chart.)	—	63	— (Note: "Keep Going Up" did not enter the German Singles Chart but debuted and peaked at number 2 on the German Trending Chart.)	—	— (Note: "Keep Going Up" peaked at number 22 on the Netherlands (Tipparade))	— (Note: "Keep Going Up" did not enter the New Zealand Singles Chart but debuted and peaked at number 9 on the New Zealand Hot Singles Chart.)	—	— (Note: "Keep Going Up" did not enter the UK Singles Chart, but peaked at number 26 on the UK Singles Downloads Chart.)		Non-album singles
"My Way" (with Anna Margo)	2023	—	—	—	—	—	—	—	—	—	—		Non-album singles
"Desire" (with Vita)	2023	—	—	—	—	—	—	—	—	—	—		Non-album singles
"If It Wasn't Up to Me" (with Zefaan)	2024	—	—	—	—	—	—	—	—	—	—		Non-album singles
"Treasure" (with Chrystel)	2025	—	—	—	—	—	—	—	—	—	—		Non-album singles
"On Site" (with Blk Odyssey)	2025	—	—	—	—	—	—	—	—	—	—		Non-album singles
"Cry Me a River" (with Steve Aoki, Dimitri Vegas & Like Mike, 3 Are Legend and W&W)	2025	—	—	—	—	—	—	—	—	—	—		Non-album singles
"The Message"	2025	—	—	—	—	—	—	—	—	—	—		Non-album singles
"Houseboy" (with Aluna and Will Sass)	2026	—	—	—	—	—	—	—	—	—	—		Non-album singles
"Can You Be Mine" (with Justin Blau & Alice Aera)	2026	—	—	—	—	—	—	—	—	—	—		Non-album singles
"Red People" (with The Game, YG & Swizz Beatz)	2026	—	—	—	—	—	—	—	—	—	—		Non-album singles
"SAFE!" (with 1K Phew)	2026	—	—	—	—	—	—	—	—	—	—		SEVEN TRUMPETS
"—" denotes a recording that did not chart or was not released in that territory.

=== As featured artist ===
List of singles as featured artist, with selected chart positions and certifications, showing year released and album name
Title	Year	Peak chart positions										Certifications	Album
Title	Year	US	AUS	AUT	CAN	GER	IRL	NL	NZ	SWI	UK	Certifications	Album
"What About Us?" (Total featuring Missy Elliott and Timbaland)	1997	16	—	—	—	—	—	—	—	—	—	RIAA: Gold	Soul Food (soundtrack)
"Hot Like Fire" (Timbaland's Groove Mix) Aaliyah (featuring Timbaland)	1997	— (Note: "Hot Like Fire" did not enter the US Billboard Hot 100, but peaked at number 31 on the US R&B/Hip Hop Airplay Chart in 1997. In 2021, after Aaliyah's discography was released onto streaming and digital services for the first time, the song peaked at number 9 on the US R&B Digital Song Sales Chart.)	—	—	—	—	—	—	—	—	30		One in a Million
"Get on the Bus" (Destiny's Child featuring Timbaland)	1998	—	—	—	—	60	—	18	—	—	15		Why Do Fools Fall in Love (soundtrack)
"Ryde or Die, Bitch" (The LOX featuring Timbaland and Eve)	1999	73	—	—	—	—	—	—	—	—	—		We Are the Streets
"We Need a Resolution" (Aaliyah featuring Timbaland)	2001	59	44	—	26	66	—	37	—	56	20		Aaliyah
"Lovely" (Bubba Sparxxx featuring Timbaland)	2001	—	—	—	—	—	—	—	—	—	—		Dark Days, Bright Nights
"Money Owners" (Shade Sheist featuring TImbaland)	2002	—	—	—	—	—	—	—	—	—	—		Informal Introduction
"I'll Be Around" (Cee-Lo featuring Timbaland)	2004	—	—	—	—	—	—	—	—	—	—		Cee-Lo Green... Is the Soul Machine
"Home Tonight" (Luddy featuring Timbaland)	2004	—	—	—	—	—	—	—	—	—	—		Home Tonight
"Promiscuous" (Nelly Furtado featuring Timbaland)	2006	1	2	12	1	6	5	13	1	6	3	RIAA: 7× Platinum; ARIA: 6× Platinum; BPI: 3× Platinum; BVMI: 3× Gold; MC: 3× Platinum; IFPI SWE: Gold; RMNZ: 7× Platinum	Loose
"SexyBack" (Justin Timberlake featuring Timbaland)	2006	1	1	5	1	1	1	5	1	2	1	RIAA: Diamond; ARIA: 5× Platinum; BPI: 3× Platinum; BVMI: Platinum; MC: 3× Platinum; RMNZ: 4× Platinum	FutureSex/LoveSounds
"Wait a Minute" (The Pussycat Dolls featuring Timbaland)	2006	28	16	49	—	27	—	17	24	41	108	RIAA: Platinum	PCD
"Ice Box" (Omarion featuring Timbaland)	2006	12	36	—	94	40	—	—	10	—	14	RIAA: Gold	21
"Anonymous" (Bobby Valentino featuring Timbaland)	2007	49	—	—	—	—	34	—	—	—	25		Special Occasion
"Ayo Technology" (50 Cent featuring Justin Timberlake and Timbaland)	2007	5	10	14	12	3	3	17	1	2	2	ARIA: 3× Platinum; BPI: Platinum; BVMI: Gold; RMNZ: Platinum	Curtis
"Elevator" (Flo Rida featuring Timbaland)	2008	16	13	69	10	34	11	—	10	92	20	RIAA: Platinum; ARIA: Gold; MC: Gold	Mail on Sunday
"4 Minutes" (Madonna featuring Justin Timberlake and Timbaland)	2008	3	1	2	1	1	1	1	3	1	1	RIAA: 2× Platinum; ARIA: Platinum; BPI: Platinum; BVMI: Platinum; RMNZ: Platinum	Hard Candy
"Dangerous" (M. Pokora featuring Timbaland and Sebastian)	2008	—	—	—	—	32	—	—	—	28	—		MP3
"Return the Favor" (Keri Hilson featuring Timbaland)	2008	—	80	25	—	21	19	—	—	—	19		In a Perfect World...
"Long Gone" (Chris Cornell featuring Timbaland)	2008	—	—	—	—	—	—	—	—	—	—		Scream
"Scream" (Chris Cornell featuring Timbaland)	2008	— (Note: "Scream" did not enter the Billboard Hot 100, but peaked at number 10 on the Bubbling Under Hot 100 chart.)	—	—	79	—	—	—	—	—	—		Scream
"Get Involved" (Ginuwine featuring Missy Elliott and Timbaland)	2010	—	—	—	—	35	—	—	—	—	—		A Man's Thoughts
"Getaway" (Michelle Branch featuring Timbaland)	2010	—	—	—	—	—	—	—	—	—	—		Non-album single
"Fascinated" (Free Sol featuring Justin Timberlake and Timbaland)	2011	—	—	—	—	—	—	—	—	—	—		No Rules
"Amnesia" (Ian Carey and Rosette featuring Timbaland and Brasco)	2012	—	60	—	—	—	—	72	—	—	—		Non-album single
"Not All About the Money" (Timati and La La Land featuring Timbaland and Grooya)	2012	—	—	32	—	29	—	—	—	7	—		Swagg
"Coke Bottle" (Agnez Mo featuring Timbaland and T.I)	2014	—	—	—	—	—	—	—	—	—	—		Non-album singles
"Magic Hotel" (Karl Wolf featuring Timbaland and BK Brasco)	2014	—	—	—	94	—	—	—	—	—	—		Non-album singles
"Dust My Shoulders Off" (Jane Zhang featuring Timbaland)	2016	— (Note: "Dust My Shoulders Off" did not enter the Billboard Hot 100, but peaked at number 31 on the Digital Song Sales chart.)	—	—	—	—	—	—	—	—	—		Past Progressive
"Move Your Body" (Wisin featuring Timbaland and Bad Bunny)	2017	—	—	—	—	—	—	—	—	—	—		Victory
"Too Much" (Zayn featuring Timbaland)	2018	—	—	—	—	—	89	—	— (Note: "Too Much" peaked at number 12 on the New Zealand Hot Singles (RMNZ))	—	79		Icarus Falls
"10 Bands" (Joyner Lucas featuring Timbaland)	2019	—	—	—	—	—	—	—	—	—	—		ADHD
"Ugly" (Jordan Hollywood featuring Timbaland)	2021	—	—	—	—	—	—	—	—	—	—		Non-album single
"I'm That Bitch" (Bia featuring Timbaland)	2023	—	—	—	—	—	—	—	—	—	—		Really Her
"Damage" (Hoshi featuring Timbaland)	2025	—	—	—	—	—	—	—	—	—	—		Happy Burstday
"—" denotes a recording that did not chart or was not released in that territory.

=== Promotional singles ===
List of promotional singles, with selected chart positions, showing year released and album name
Title	Year	Peak chart positions				Certifications	Album
Title	Year	US	AUS	CAN	UK	Certifications	Album
"Throw It on Me" (featuring The Hives)	2007	—	50	—	—		Shock Value
"Bounce" (featuring Dr. Dre, Justin Timberlake and Missy Elliott)	2008	93	—	—	176	RMNZ: Gold	Shock Value
"Ain't I" (Jay-Z featuring Timbaland)	2008	— (Note: "Ain't I" did not enter the Billboard Hot 100, but peaked at number 13 on the Bubbling Under R&B/Hip-Hop Songs chart.)	—	—	—		Non-album single
"We Belong to the Music" (featuring Miley Cyrus)	2010	— (Note: "We Belong to the Music" did not enter the Billboard Hot 100, but peaked at number 11 on the Bubbling Under Hot 100 chart.)	—	63	—		Shock Value II
"Break Ya Back" (featuring Dev)	2012	—	—	—	—		Non-album singles
"9th Inning" (Missy Elliott featuring Timbaland)	2012	—	—	—	—		Non-album singles
"Triple Threat" (Missy Elliott featuring Timbaland)	2012	—	—	—	—		Non-album singles
"Know Bout Me" (featuring Jay-Z, Drake and James Fauntleroy)	2013	—	24	—	—		Non-album singles
"Smile" (with V. Bozeman)	2015	—	—	—	—		Non-album singles
"Don't Get No Betta" (featuring Mila J)	2015	—	—	—	—		King Stays King
"I'm Your Baby" (with LUN3) (Timbaland Remixes)	2026	—	—	—	—		Non-album single
"—" denotes a recording that did not chart or was not released in that territory.

== Other charted songs ==
List of songs, with selected chart positions, showing year released and album name
Title	Year	Peak chart positions				Album
Title	Year	US	US R&B	CAN	UK	Album
"Diddy Rock" (Diddy featuring Timbaland, Twista and Shawnna)	2006	—	— (Note: "Diddy Rock" did not enter the Hot R&B/Hip-Hop Songs, but peaked at number 24 on the Bubbling Under R&B/Hip-Hop Songs chart.)	—	—	Press Play
"Release" (featuring Justin Timberlake)	2007	91	—	86	105	Shock Value
"Undertow" (featuring The Fray and Esthero)	2010	100	—	—	—	Shock Value II
"All Night Long" (Demi Lovato featuring Timbaland and Missy Elliott)	2011	— (Note: "All Night Long" did not enter the Billboard Hot 100, but peaked at number 24 on the Bubbling Under Hot 100 chart.)	—	—	—	Unbroken
"Paper, Scissors, Rock" (Chris Brown featuring Timbaland and Big Sean)	2011	—	— (Note: "Paper, Scissors, Rock" did not enter the Hot R&B/Hip-Hop Songs, but peaked at number 23 on the Bubbling Under R&B/Hip-Hop Songs chart.)	—	—	F.A.M.E.
"—" denotes a recording that did not chart or was not released in that territory.

== Guest appearances ==
List of non-single guest appearances, with other performing artists, showing year released and album name
Title	Year	Other artist(s)	Album
"In the Meanwhile"	1993	Jodeci	Diary of a Mad Band
"Bring on da Funk"	1995	Jodeci	The Show, the After Party, the Hotel
"Ladies in da House"	1996	Aaliyah, Missy Elliott	One in a Million
"Came to Give Love (Outro)"	1996	Aaliyah	One in a Million
"550 What?"	1996	Ginuwine	Ginuwine... the Bachelor
"They Don't Wanna Fuck with Us"	1997	Missy Elliott	Supa Dupa Fly
"Pass da Blunt"	1997	Missy Elliott	Supa Dupa Fly
"Da Funk"	1998	—N/a	Dr. Dolittle (soundtrack)
"Talkin' Trash"	1999	Bassey	The PJs (soundtrack)
"Nobody"	2000	Mack 10	The Paper Route
"Party"	2001	Sincere	Exit Wounds (soundtrack)
"Watcha Gonna Do"	2001	Missy Elliott	Miss E... So Addictive
"I"	2001	Petey Pablo	Diary of a Sinner: 1st Entry
"Twerk a Little"	2001	Bubba Sparxxx	Dark Days, Bright Nights
"Tell 'Em It's On"	2002	Pastor Troy	Universal Soldier
"Ching Ching, Part 2"	2002	Ms. Jade	Girl Interrupted
"Warrant"	2003	Bubba Sparxxx, Attitude	Deliverance
"Let It Bump"	2003	Missy Elliott	This Is Not a Test!
"Good Foot"	2004	Justin Timberlake	Shark Tale (soundtrack)
"Get Down"	2006	Busta Rhymes	The Big Bang
"Chop Me Up"	2006	Justin Timberlake, Three-6-Mafia	FutureSex/LoveSounds
"Diddy Rock"	2006	Diddy, Shawnna, Twista	Press Play
"3 A.M."	2006	Young Jeezy	The Inspiration
"She Said, I Said (Time We Let Go)"	2007	NLT	Not Like Them
"Come Around"	2007	M.I.A.	Kala
"Twisted"	2008	New Kids on the Block	The Block
"More Bottles"	2009	Wyclef Jean	From the Hut, to the Projects, to the Mansion
"Lie to Me"	2010	Keri Hilson	No Boys Allowed
"Won't Be Long"	2010	Keri Hilson	No Boys Allowed
"Last Hangover"	2010	Keyshia Cole	Calling All Hearts
"Get Familiar"	2011	Game	Purp & Patron: The Hangover
"I Just Wanna F."	2011	David Guetta, Dev	Nothing but the Beat
"All Night Along"	2011	Demi Lovato, Missy Elliott	Unbroken
"Don't Hurt It"	2012	Dev	The Night the Sun Came Up
"Wobbley" (Remix)	2012	Sebastian	none
"Whole Lotta"	2013	Attitude, DJ Khaled	none
"You Don't Want These Problems"	2013	DJ Khaled, 2 Chainz, Ace Hood, Meek Mill, French Montana, Rick Ross, Big Sean	Suffering from Success
"Love Just Ain't Enough"	2015	Monica	Code Red
"All Men Lie"	2015	Monica	Code Red
"Smile"	2016	Yo Gotti	The Art of Hustle
"Mi Declaración"	2018	Maluma, Sid	F.A.M.E.
"God Only Knows" (Remix)	2019	For King & Country, Echosmith	—N/a

== Music videos ==
=== As lead artist ===
Song	Year	Featured artists	Director
"Here We Come"	1998	Missy "Misdemeanor" Elliott and Magoo	Francis Lawrence
"Lobster & Scrimp"	1999	Jay-Z	Tim Mosley
"Give It to Me"	2007	Nelly Furtado and Justin Timberlake	Paul "Coy" Allen
"Throw It on Me"	2007	The Hives	Justin Francis
"The Way I Are"	2007	Keri Hilson, D.O.E. and Sebastian	Shane Drake
"Scream"	2008	Keri Hilson and Nicole Scherzinger	Justin Francis
"Morning After Dark"	2009	Nelly Furtado and SoShy	Paul "Coy" Allen
"Say Something"	2009	Drake	Paul "Coy" Allen
"If We Ever Meet Again"	2010	Katy Perry	Paul "Coy" Allen
"Carry Out"	2010	Justin Timberlake	Bryan Barber
"Pass at Me"	2011	Pitbull	Aaron Platt and Joseph Toman
"Hands in the Air"	2012	Ne-Yo	Marc Klasfeld
"Keep Going Up"	2023	Justin Timberlake & Nelly Furtado	N/A
"My Way"	2023	Anna Margo	Daniel Carberry
"Desire"	2023	VITA	Lev Jutsen & Naz

=== As featured artist ===
Song	Year	Artist	Director
"We Need a Resolution"	2001	Aaliyah	Paul Hunter
"Promiscuous"	2006	Nelly Furtado	Little X
"Wait a Minute"	2006	Pussycat Dolls	Marc Webb
"Ice Box"	2006	Omarion	Anthony Mandler
"Elevator"	2007	Flo Rida	Gil Green
"4 Minutes"	2008	Madonna	Jonas & François
"Return the Favor"	2008	Keri Hilson	Melina Matsoukas
"Scream"	2009	Chris Cornell	Alan Ferguson
"Getaway"	2010	Michelle Branch	Mini Countryman
"Fascinated"	2011	Free Sol	
"Amnesia"	2012	Ian Carey	
"Not All About the Money"	2012	Timati	Pavel Hoodyakov

== As songwriter ==
Year	Song	Artist	Album
2002	"(Oh No) What You Got"	Justin Timberlake	Justified
2002	"Cry Me a River"	Justin Timberlake	Justified
2002	"(And She Said) Take Me Now"	Justin Timberlake	Justified
2002	"Right for Me"	Justin Timberlake	Justified
2003	"Jimmy Mathis"	Bubba Sparxxx	Deliverance
2003	"Comin' Round"	Bubba Sparxxx	Deliverance
2003	"Nowhere"	Bubba Sparxxx	Deliverance
2003	"Overcome"	Bubba Sparxxx	Deliverance
2003	"Warrant Interlude"	Bubba Sparxxx	Deliverance
2003	"Warrant"	Bubba Sparxxx	Deliverance
2003	"Deliverance"	Bubba Sparxxx	Deliverance
2003	"Hootnanny"	Bubba Sparxxx	Deliverance
2003	"Take a Load Off"	Bubba Sparxxx	Deliverance
2003	"My Tone"	Bubba Sparxxx	Deliverance
2004	"I'm So Fly"	Lloyd Banks	The Hunger for More
2004	"Exodus '04"	Hikaru Utada	Exodus
2004	"Let Me Give You My Love"	Hikaru Utada	Exodus
2005	"Wait a Minute"	Pussycat Dolls	PCD
2006	"Afraid"	Nelly Furtado	Loose
2006	"Maneater"	Nelly Furtado	Loose
2006	"Promiscuous"	Nelly Furtado	Loose
2006	"Glow"	Nelly Furtado	Loose
2006	"No Hay Igual"	Nelly Furtado	Loose
2006	"Do It"	Nelly Furtado	Loose
2006	"Wait for You"	Nelly Furtado	Loose
2006	"All Good Things (Come to an End)"	Nelly Furtado	Loose
2006	"FutureSex/LoveSound"	Justin Timberlake	FutureSex/LoveSounds
2006	"SexyBack"	Justin Timberlake	FutureSex/LoveSounds
2006	"Sexy Ladies/Let Me Talk to You (Prelude)"	Justin Timberlake	FutureSex/LoveSounds
2006	"My Love"	Justin Timberlake	FutureSex/LoveSounds
2006	"LoveStoned/I Think She Knows (Interlude)"	Justin Timberlake	FutureSex/LoveSounds
2006	"What Goes Around... Comes Around"	Justin Timberlake	FutureSex/LoveSounds
2006	"Chop Me Up"	Justin Timberlake	FutureSex/LoveSounds
2006	"Summer Love/Set the Mood (Prelude)"	Justin Timberlake	FutureSex/LoveSounds
2006	"Until the End of Time"	Justin Timberlake	FutureSex/LoveSounds
2006	"Losing My Way"	Justin Timberlake	FutureSex/LoveSounds
2007	"Sell Me Candy"	Rihanna	Good Girl Gone Bad
2007	"Lemme Get That"	Rihanna	Good Girl Gone Bad
2007	"Rehab"	Rihanna	Good Girl Gone Bad
2008	"4 Minutes"	Madonna	Hard Candy
2008	"Miles Away"	Madonna	Hard Candy
2008	"Dance 2night"	Madonna	Hard Candy
2008	"Devil Wouldn't Recognize You"	Madonna	Hard Candy
2008	"Voices"	Madonna	Hard Candy
2008	"Return the Favor"	Keri Hilson	In a Perfect World…
2008	"Where Did He Go"	Keri Hilson	In a Perfect World…
2008	"Magic"	Pussycat Dolls	Doll Domination
2008	"Halo"	Pussycat Dolls	Doll Domination
2008	"In Person"	Pussycat Dolls	Doll Domination
2008	"Whatchamacallit"	Pussycat Dolls	Doll Domination
2009	"Off That"	Jay-Z	The Blueprint 3

== See also ==
- Timbaland's production discography
- Timbaland & Magoo discography
