= Shock Value II =

- Standard edition cover. Deluxe edition features a red color scheme.

Studio album by Timbaland
- Released: December 8, 2009
- Studios: Thomas Crown (Virginia Beach, Virginia)
- Genres: Hip-hop; R&B
- Length: 73:16
- Labels: Mosley; Blackground; Interscope
- Producers: Timothy "Timbaland" Mosley; Jim Beanz; J-Roc; The Fray; Polow da Don; Ryan Tedder

Timbaland chronology
Shock Value (2007)	Shock Value II (2009)	King Stays King (2015)

Singles from Shock Value II
- 1. "Morning After Dark" Released: October 26, 2009; 2. "Say Something" Released: November 3, 2009; 3. "Carry Out" Released: December 1, 2009; 4. "If We Ever Meet Again" Released: December 1, 2009

Shock Value II is the third studio album by the American musician Timbaland. It serves as the sequel to his previous album, Shock Value. Initially slated for a 2008 release, the project was pushed into 2009 and tentatively confirmed for November 23, 2009, through Mosley Music Group, Blackground Records and Interscope Records, however, it was pushed back once more and finally released on December 7, 2009, in the UK and December 8 in the US.

The album was supported by the singles "Carry Out" (featuring Justin Timberlake) and "Say Something" (featuring Drake). Unlike its predecessor, it expands beyond hip hop and R&B to include collaborations with alternative rock acts Chad Kroeger, Jet, the Fray and Daughtry, as well as pop artists Katy Perry, Miley Cyrus, JoJo, Melody Thornton, and Esthero. Upon release, Shock Value II performed moderately on the Billboard 200 and was met with unfavorable critical reception.

== Background and production ==
Timbaland spoke to MTV's Shaheem Reid back in July 2008 to confirm that he was working on the follow-up to his platinum-selling Shock Value. At the time he confirmed that he had one track with Madonna which although recorded for her album Hard Candy it had not been used and could end up on this album instead. He was insistent that he would also collaborate with Jordin Sparks, Beyoncé, Rihanna, Jonas Brothers, Miley Cyrus, T.I. and Chris Brown However, none of these collaborations (except Miley Cyrus) made it to the final track list. He also said that alongside T-Pain who will definitely appear, he hoped to get Jay-Z on board, although he ultimately failed to do so.

Timbaland also told Invasion Radio in October 2009 that he had used PSP application Beaterator to produce some of the beats for Shock Value II as well as Jay Z's last album.

Speaking of the album in November 2009, Timbaland said:

I’m so fortunate and blessed to be able to create a Shock Value II, I’m really proud of the caliber of artists on this album and all the work they put into making it a success. I can promise that no one has ever heard Katy Perry, The Fray, or Brandy sound like this before. It’s exciting because not only am I giving fans the best of me on each track, I’m giving them a glimpse of their favorite artist in a completely different light. This is an album that can be listened to from start to finish every single time because each song is so unique and the range of artists so diverse. I can’t wait for my fans to hear the collaborations.

== Music and collaborations ==
Billboard reported in October that Timbaland had collaborated with a number of previous collaborators to produce the album which will feature guest vocals just like Shock Value. Justin Timberlake recorded vocals for two song. The first, "Carry Out", features on the album, while the second, "Crazy Girl", contains a sample of "I Love Them Girls" by Tank, but was not included on the album. The song "Maniac" was set to appear on the album with features vocals from Keri Hilson and Chris Brown; however, in November 2009, during an interview with E! Online, it was revealed that both Brown and Timbaland mutually agreed to this version of the song. A new incarnation of the song does appear on the album titled "The One I Love", still featuring Hilson's vocals, but this time alongside D.O.E. The duo previously collaborated to feature on Timbaland's 2007 number one single "The Way I Are.

Nelly Furtado, whose 2006 album Loose was executive produced by Timabaland, is featured on the album's lead single "Morning After Dark" along with Timbaland's new artist SoShy. Timbaland described the song as

very interesting — it features this new artist on my label called SoShy from Paris. We're both rapping. The song — I can't describe it — it's so different. It's not different for me, but I can tell you this: it fits everything going on with the vampire theme. It fits everything with Twilight.

He added that "that record has the most unique sound from the whole album". Timbaland previously worked with Brandy Norwood on her album Afrodisiac and although recording sessions were completed for her 2008 follow up Human their work did not make the album. However Brandy appears on two songs for his new album as her alter-ego Bran'Nu. The first song is called "Meet in tha Middle" while the second is called "Symphony" and also features rapper Attitude. The latter song also features vocals from D.O.E.

Although Timbaland's protégé group OneRepublic (previously appeared on Shock Value's worldwide hit "Apologize") have written and produced their second album Waking Up themselves they have sent the producer a rock-themed recording "Marchin On" which was remixed for inclusion on Shock Value 2 while appearing in a stripped version on their own album. Other similarly themed recordings come in the form of American rockband Daughtry on the song "Long Way Down", The Fray on "Undertow" also featuring Canadian songwriter Esthero, with Australian rockband Jet on "Timothy (Where Have You Been)" and with Nickelback's Chad Kroeger for the song "Tomorrow in the Bottle" with a verse from rapper Sebastian.

Billboard Magazine reported on several other artists who collaborated for the album (Paramore, Gucci Mane, and All-American Rejects) whose songs do not appear on the final track listing. The album also features the hip-hop producer working on a number of new directions for his music. In an interview with Ryan Seacrest it was revealed that the producer has worked on several surprising collaborations with pop artists such as Miley Cyrus on the song "We Belong to the Music", Katy Perry on the song "If We Ever Meet Again" and JoJo on the song "Lose Control". JoJo also appears on the song "Timothy (Where Have You Been)" where she can be heard singing backing vocals but is not featured.

The album also remains true to the producer's hip-hop and urban roots with collaborations with Drake on "Say Something" which was released as the album's second single. Esthero makes an additional appearance on the song "Can You Feel It" with Sebastian's vocals. Finally the album features the song "Ease Off the Liquor" which has no accredited featured artist although female vocals provide the backing in the chorus. It was speculated that the song would feature Melody Thornton however it was later confirmed that the background vocals and ad-libs are provided by both Thornton & SoShy. In the week commencing November 9, 2009 the song was sent to Urban radio in the US.

Several other Timbaland recordings received media attention and were reported on the internet but not included in the final track listing. Shakira was asked to record vocals on the song "Give It Up to Me" but the recording is not included on Shock Value 2, instead it was included on her sixth studio album She Wolf and released as the second US single. Although both T-Pain and Missy Elliott were said to feature on the album for definite, their collaboration "Talk That" is not included. Additionally it was reported that Jay-Z's collaboration for the album would come in the form of song called "Rumours" with Keri Hilson but later it was revealed that the song was intended for Beyoncé who back in 2007 was recording with Timbaland for her third studio album I Am... Sasha Fierce.

== Promotion and release ==
The album was initially slated for a November 4, 2008 release but this clashed with the 2008 US Presidential Election. The album was then put on hold so that Timbaland could work on Jay-Z's album The Blueprint 3 which was released September 2009. Then Rap-Up magazine confirmed that the album would be released as part of Super Monday, November 23, 2009 in both the US and UK with the US also receiving a 2-disc deluxe edition. However the magazine revealed on October 29, 2009 that the album had been pushed back to December 8, 2009.

Timbaland performed part of the lead single "Morning After Dark" live at one of the album's launch parties at Mandalay Bay Beach on October 17 and again During the F1 in Abu Dhabi, UAE on October 30, 2009. Then he appeared with Nelly Furtado and SoShy for the first fully featured live performance of the song at the American Music Awards (2009) on November 22, 2009. On November 23, 2009 the trio appeared on The Tonight Show with Conan O'Brien for an encoré performance.

=== Singles ===
- "Morning After Dark", featuring SoShy and Nelly Furtado, premiered on October 16, 2009 on Ryan Seacrest's KIIS-FM radio show, On-Air with Ryan Seacrest with Timbaland describing it as the kick-off song from the project. It was later confirmed actual single release of the song would feature an additional verse from Nelly Furtado. Both versions were made available for download from October 26, 2009 but the version featuring SoShy was originally used for the music video with Nelly Furtado's verse added in later. It reached #61 on the Billboard Hot 100 and #6 on the UK Singles Chart.
- "Say Something" featuring Canadian rapper Drake was released to US iTunes on November 3, 2009. It was officially sent to U.S. Urban radio on January 12, 2010. It is the album's second single and has reached number 23 on the Hot 100, making it the second most successful single on the album.
- "Carry Out" featuring Justin Timberlake is the third single from the album but was initially only released in the U.S. It was sent to US radio on December 1, 2009. It is the most successful single on the album, peaking at number 11 on the Billboard Hot 100. The music video premiered on February 18, 2010. It was released as the third UK single on April 26, 2010.
- "If We Ever Meet Again" featuring Katy Perry is the album's fourth single. The music video premiered on January 18, 2010. In the UK, it was released February 15, 2010 and reached number one in New Zealand and number three in the UK and Ireland. The song has reached number 37 on the Billboard Hot 100.

Other charted songs

- "Undertow" featuring The Fray and Esthero charted on the Billboard Hot 100 at #100, the week ending November 28, 2009.
- "We Belong to the Music" (with Miley Cyrus) and "If We Ever Meet Again" (with Katy Perry) were both released to the US iTunes store as promotional singles prior to the album's release on December 1, 2009. "If We Ever Meet Again" later debuted at 98 on the Billboard Hot 100 on the week ending December 19, 2009.

== Critical reception ==
Professional ratings
Review scores
Source	Rating
Allmusic	2/5 stars
Billboard	(mixed)
Entertainment Weekly	(B−)
Los Angeles Times	2/4 stars
New York Times	(unfavorable)
NME	(5/10)
The Observer	(unfavorable)
Rolling Stone	2.5/5 stars
Slant Magazine	1.5/5 stars
USA Today	3.5/4 stars

The album received mixed to negative reviews. Review normalizer Metacritic gave the album 50 out of 100 based on 9 critical reviews. Andy Kellman of AllMusic said "Timbaland does not stock Shock Value II with quite as many guests, and performs a higher percentage of the vocals, and what results is less schizophrenic and more directly pop than its antecedent. The highs here are not as high, and the lows are as low, unless you consider the very presence of Chad Kroeger and Daughtry, or the unveiling of Brandy’s rapping alter ego Bran’ Nu, to be more odious than a sub-Coldplay ballad. [...] That said, it is a mildly entertaining album—as long as you block out most of the lyrics."

David Balls of Digital Spy agreed saying that "Timbaland dips into his usual bag of production tricks here and many of the supporting cast dutifully return, but never does this quite reach the same excitement levels as its predecessor. [...] it feels as though Tim's trying so hard to impress us with his pimped-up SUV that he's driven the thing off the road. The result? A disparate, disjointed collection of songs that feels like less than the sum of its parts. Where Shock Value was fresh and innovative, much of the sequel could pass for leftovers from its predecessor. [...] He now seems to be lagging behind rivals like David Guetta and will.iam when it comes to driving the urban pop genre forward"

Jon Pareles from The New York Times added "The productions flaunt Timbaland trademarks: vocal sounds imitating turntable scratching, quick keyboard arabesques, grunts as percussion. But now he fills in the spaces that made his old tracks so startling. [...] For a few moments Timbaland ignores the Top 10 and accepts that he’s an adult."

Slant magazine's Jesse Cataldo who said "Shock Value II is a vanity project, the kind of bonus fluff that you can get away with releasing when you're as famous and respected as Timbaland. [...] To be fair, Timbaland is not a terrible rapper. His clumsy flow is no worse than Diddy's jittery streams of twaddle, but it's just as annoying. The tendency here, whether intentional or not, is to surround himself with mediocre talent rather than the titans who he helped make superstars [...] The overall laziness of that facet is even more inexcusable coming from one of the most renowned producers of the last decade.".

The most positive review comes from USA Today, Steve Jones says "He misses occasionally on this 17-track opus, but he's mainly on target with his jolts to the eardrums."

However, August Brown of the Los Angeles Times was slightly less critical, stating that, "many of the same vices that plagued the first installment of Shock Value keep the second edition sodden as well: Tim's precise, micromanaged beats usually outshine his random collection of vocal collaborators." Brown said that the album was not a complete disaster but "for Timbaland fans pining for previous hits like Aaliyah's "Are You That Somebody?" or Furtado's "Say It Right," Shock Value II is a weak cocktail."

The editor from Entertainment Weekly said on the December 11 issue (page 115), "So far, so predictable—at least until "Tomorrow In The Bottle," which features Chad Kroeger of Nickelback. That guy's got a funky bone? Talk about a shocker. (67 out of 100)"

Steve Juon from Rapreviews.com said "There are only a few producers out there in rap who can get away with putting their name on an album and be a bigger star than anyone rapping on their tracks. There are even fewer who can crossover from hardcore hip-hop heads to become a mainstream household name. [...] it's not a pure "Timbaland Presents" situation like it has been in the past, where one felt Timbaland was simply showcasing artists he felt deserved the shine over his own high quality sound. The sound's still high quality on "Shock Value II," it's just not 100% his own any more."

== Commercial performance ==
The album did not chart as highly as the previous Shock Value album, which had debuted at number five in the US in 2007, with 138,000 copies sold in its first week. Instead, Shock Value II debuted on the U.S. Billboard 200 at an underwhelming number 36, with 37,834 copies in its first week. It fared better on the Billboard Top R&B/Hip-Hop Albums chart, entering at number seven. Similarly, in the United Kingdom, as well as in Ireland, the album only managed to chart at number 25 in its first week. These positions failed to match those of Shock Value I (2007) which reached number two and number one in the UK and Ireland respectively.

== Track listing ==
Shock Value II track listing
No.	Title	Writer(s)	Producer(s)	Length
1.	"Intro" (performed by DJ Felli Fel)		Timbaland	0:48
2.	"Carry Out" (featuring Justin Timberlake)	Timothy Mosley; Jerome "J-Roc" Harmon; Justin Timberlake; Timothy Clayton; Jim Beanz	Timbaland; Harmon; Beanz^{[a]}	3:52
3.	"Lose Control" (featuring JoJo)	T. Mosley; Harmon; Nikesha Briscoe	Timbaland; Harmon^{[b]}	4:28
4.	"Meet in tha Middle" (featuring Bran' Nu)	Jamal Jones; Clayton; Brandy Norwood; John Maultsby; Paul Dawson; T. Mosley	Polow da Don; Timbaland^{[b]}	4:00
5.	"Say Something" (featuring Drake)	T. Mosley; Harmon; Aubrey Graham; Clayton; Maultsby	Timbaland; Harmon^{[b]}	4:00
6.	"Tomorrow in the Bottle" (featuring Chad Kroeger and Sebastian)	T. Mosley; Harmon; Garland Mosley; Brandon Deener; Kroeger; Beanz; Clayton	Timbaland; Harmon^{[b]}; Wizz Dumb^{[c]}; Beanz^{[a]}	5:28
7.	"We Belong to the Music" (featuring Miley Cyrus)	T. Mosley; Harmon; Beanz; Walter Milsap; Candice Nelson	Timbaland; Harmon^{[b]}; Beanz^{[a]}	4:28
8.	"Morning After Dark" (featuring Nelly Furtado and SoShy)	T. Mosley; Harmon; Deborah Epstein; Michelle Bell; Keri Hilson; Furtado; Beanz; Maultsby	Timbaland; Harmon^{[b]}; Beanz^{[a]}	3:51
9.	"If We Ever Meet Again" (featuring Katy Perry)	Beanz; T. Mosley; Michael Busbee	Beanz; Timbaland; Beanz^{[a]}	4:52
10.	"Can You Feel It" (featuring Esthero and Sebastian)	T. Mosley; Harmon; Clayton; Beanz; G. Mosley	Timbaland; Harmon; Beanz^{[a]}	4:44
11.	"Ease Off the Liquor"	T. Mosley; Harmon; Maultsby; Beanz; Clayton	Timbaland; Harmon; Beanz^{[a]}	5:58
12.	"Undertow" (featuring The Fray and Esthero)	Joe King; Isaac Slade; T. Mosley; Beanz	The Fray; Timbaland; Harmon^{[c]}; Beanz^{[a]}	4:22
13.	"Timothy Where You Been" (featuring Jet)	T. Mosley; Harmon; Clayton; Beanz; Chris Cester	Timbaland; Harmon; Beanz^{[a]}	4:47
14.	"Long Way Down" (featuring Daughtry)	T. Mosley; Harmon; Chris Daughtry; Joey Barnes; Josh Paul; Josh Steely; Brian Craddock; Beanz	Timbaland; Harmon	4:23
15.	"Marchin On" (Timbo Version; featuring OneRepublic)	Ryan Tedder; T. Mosley; Beanz	Tedder; Timbaland	4:12
16.	"The One I Love" (featuring Keri Hilson and D.O.E.)	T. Mosley; Hilson; Harmon; Maultsby; Briscoe; Dennis Matkosky; Micheal Sembello	Timbaland; Harmon	4:34
17.	"Symphony" (featuring Attitude, Bran' Nu and D.O.E.)	T. Mosley; Harmon; Clayton; Norwood; Maultsby; Beanz; Keithin Pittman	Timbaland; Harmon	4:21

French track
No.	Title	Writer(s)	Producer(s)	Length
18.	"Morning After Dark" (French Version; featuring SoShy)	T. Mosley; Harmon; Epstein; Bell; Hilson; Furtado; Beanz; Maultsby; Guenael Geay	Timbaland; Harmon^{[b]}; Beanz^{[a]}	4:01

Japan bonus track
No.	Title	Writer(s)	Producer(s)	Length
18.	"Morning After Dark" (B-Boy Fix Remix; featuring Nelly Furtado and SoShy)	T. Mosley; Harmon; Epstein; Bell; Hilson; Furtado; Beanz; Maultsby	Chew Fu 2016	4:06

UK bonus track
No.	Title	Writer(s)	Producer(s)	Length
18.	"Morning After Dark" (Freeman Remix; featuring Nelly Furtado, Rey Vy and SoShy)	T. Mosley; Harmon; Epstein; Bell; Hilson; Furtado; Beanz; Maultsby	Freeman	4:10

Notes

- ^{^[a]} denotes vocal producer(s)
- ^{^[b]} denotes co-producer(s)
- ^{^[c]} denotes additional producer(s)

Sample credits

- On Track 6, "Tomorrow In the Bottle", is a remake of "Bottom of the Bottle" by Sebastian, interpolating and sampling the first verse.
- On Track 13 "Timothy Where You Been" interpolates and samples Jet's 2003 song "Timothy" from their debut album Get Born.
- On Track 15 "Marchin On (Timbo Version)" remix, original song featured on OneRepublic's second studio album, Waking Up.
- On Track 17 "Symphony" interpolations from "The Symphony" by Masta Ace, Craig G, Kool G Rap and Big Daddy Kane.

=== U.S. edition ===
Disc One

1. "Intro" (by DJ Felli Fel) – 0:48
2. "Carry Out" (featuring Justin Timberlake) – 3:52
3. "Lose Control" (featuring JoJo) – 4:28
4. "Meet In tha Middle" (featuring Bran' Nu) – 4:00
5. "Say Something" (featuring Drake) – 4:00
6. "Tomorrow In the Bottle" (featuring Chad Kroeger & Sebastian) – 5:28
7. "We Belong to the Music" (featuring Miley Cyrus) – 4:28
8. "Morning After Dark" (featuring Nelly Furtado & SoShy) – 3:51
9. "If We Ever Meet Again" (with Katy Perry) – 4:52
10. "Can You Feel It" (featuring Esthero & Sebastian) – 4:44
11. "Ease Off the Liquor" – 5:58
12. "Undertow" (featuring The Fray & Esthero) – 4:22
13. "Timothy Where You Been" (featuring Jet) – 4:47

Disc Two (Deluxe edition)

1. "Long Way Down" (featuring Daughtry) – 4:23
2. "Marchin On (Timbo Version)" (featuring OneRepublic) – 4:12
3. "The One I Love" (featuring Keri Hilson & D.O.E.) – 4:34
4. "Symphony" (featuring Attitude, Bran'Nu & D.O.E.) – 4:21

== Personnel ==
Credits are source and adapted from Discogs.

Management

- Production coordinator – Mike "Daddy" Evans
- A&R and co-executive producer – Barry Hankerson

Interscope Records

- A&R – DJ Mormile, Martin Kierszenbaum, Manny Smith
- A&R coordinator – Terrence Nelson
- Marketing Tiffany Johnson, Andrew Flad
- Marketing coordinator – Laura Carter
- Production coordinator – Andrew Van Meter
- Business Affairs – Craig Marshall, Todd Douglas
- Publicity – Dennis Dennehy
- Creative direction – Ianthe Zevos
- Performer, executive producer – Timothy "Timbaland" Mosley
- Photographer – Albert Watson

Mosley Music Group

- A&R – Rick Frazier & Eric Spence
- A&R assistant: Sheena Curry
- Marketing: Marcus Spence, Monique Mosley
- Marketing assistant: Dawn Palmer
- Timbaland and Mosley Music, LLC Legal: Theo Sedlmayr, Esq. & Lisa Donini, Esq. for Sedlmayr & Associates, P.C.

Technical

- Matt Bang – editing, recording
- Jim Beanz – producer, bass
- Demacio "Demo" Castellon – recording
- Paul "Hot Sauce" Dawson – keyboards
- Wizz Dumb – additional producer
- Chris Godbey – vocal mixing
- Jerome "Jroc" Harmon – producer
- Mark Hartnett – guitarist
- Bryan Jones – assistant engineer
- Jamal "Polow da Don" Jones – producer
- Kaki King – guitarist
- Chris Kasych – assistant engineer
- "Koil" – recording
- Johnathan Merritt – assistant engineer
- "Metal" – recording
- "J. Mizzle" – producer
- Brian Morton – assistant engineer
- Josh Mosser – recording, dubbing engineer
- John Netti – assistant engineer
- Eric Olsen – recording
- Dan Rockett – guitarist
- Fareed Salamah – assistant engineer
- Daniel Stone – percussion
- Ryan Tedder – producer
- Julian Vasquez – assistant engineer
- Brian Vurtue – recording

Background vocals

- Amar, Deborah "SoShy" Epstein, Joanna "JoJo" Levesque, Alex Williams, Candice Nelson, Melody Thornton

Guest appearances

- Chad Kroeger courtesy of Roadrunner Records
- Brandy Norwood (Bran'Nu) courtesy of Knockout Entertainment
- Justin Timberlake courtesy of Jive Records
- Drake courtesy of Young Money / Cash Money Records, Universal Music
- JoJo courtesy of Blackground Records / Interscope Records
- Sebastian courtesy of 757 Records
- Miley Cyrus courtesy of Hollywood Records
- Alex Williams courtesy of Jive Records
- Nelly Furtado courtesy of Mosley Music Group /Geffen Records
- SoShy courtesy of Mosley Music Group/Interscope Records
- Katy Perry courtesy of Capitol Records
- The Fray courtesy of Epic Records
- Jet courtesy of Elektra Records
- Daughtry courtesy of 19 Recordings / RCA Music Group / Sony Music Entertainment
- OneRepublic courtesy of Mosley Music Group / Interscope Records
- Keri Hilson courtesy of Mosley Music Group / Zone 4 Records / Interscope Records
- D.O.E. courtesy of Milk It Entertainment
- Esthero courtesy of Pink Pirate Productions
- Attitude courtesy of Steel City Record

== Charts ==
=== Weekly charts ===
Weekly chart performance for Shock Value II
Chart (2009–2010)	Peak position
Australian Albums (ARIA)	35
Austrian Albums (Ö3 Austria)	23
Belgian Albums (Ultratop Flanders)	49
Belgian Albums (Ultratop Wallonia)	75
Canadian Albums (Billboard)	16
Dutch Albums (Album Top 100)	37
French Albums (SNEP)	73
German Albums (Offizielle Top 100)	15
Greek Albums (IFPI)	8
Ireland (IRMA)	25
Italian Albums (FIMI)	56
New Zealand Albums (RMNZ)	36
Polish Albums (ZPAV)	11
Scottish Albums (Official Charts)	23
Swiss Albums (Schweizer Hitparade)	5
UK Albums (Official Charts)	25
UK R&B Albums (Official Charts)	4
US Billboard 200	36
US Top R&B/Hip-Hop Albums (Billboard)	7

=== Year-end charts ===
Year-end chart performance for Shock Value II
Chart (2010)	Position
European Top 100 Albums (Billboard)	91
German Albums (Offizielle Top 100)	87
US Billboard 200	149
US Top R&B/Hip-Hop Albums (Billboard)	36

== Certifications ==
Region	Certification	Certified units/sales
Canada (Music Canada)	Platinum	80,000^{‡}
Germany (BVMI)	Gold	100,000^{^}
Poland (ZPAV)	Gold	10,000^{*}
Switzerland (IFPI Switzerland)	Gold	15,000^{^}
United Kingdom (BPI)	Gold	100,000^{^}
^{*} Sales figures based on certification alone.^{^} Shipments figures based on certification alone.^{‡} Sales+streaming figures based on certification alone.

== Release history ==
Region	Date	Format	Label	Catalogue
Germany	December 4, 2009	International CD / Download	Universal Music	602527273969
Australia	December 4, 2009	International CD / Download	Universal Music	060252727396
Ireland	December 4, 2009	International CD / Download	Universal Music	2727396
United Kingdom	December 7, 2009	International CD / Download	Polydor	2727396
Hungary	December 7, 2009	International edition	Universal Music	00602527273969
Canada	December 8, 2009	Standard edition	Universal Music	B001364502
Canada	December 8, 2009	Deluxe edition (2 disc)	Universal Music	B001364572
United States	December 8, 2009	Standard edition	Blackground, Mosley Music, Interscope	602527237732
United States	December 8, 2009	Deluxe edition (2 disc)	Blackground, Mosley Music, Interscope	602527237749
United States	December 8, 2009	Vinyl LP	Blackground, Mosley Music, Interscope	602527237831
Denmark	December 9, 2009	International CD / Download	Universal Music	060252727396
Finland	December 9, 2009	International CD / Download	Universal Music	060252727396
Sweden	December 9, 2009	International CD / Download	Universal Music	060252727396
Brazil	December 15, 2009	International CD / Download	Universal Music	602527273969
Japan	December 16, 2009	International CD / Download	Universal Music	UICS1201
