= If We Ever Meet Again =

2009 single by Timbaland

Single by Timbaland featuring Katy Perry

from the album Shock Value II
- Released: December 1, 2009
- Studio: No Excuses (Santa Monica, California); Sunset Sound (Los Angeles, California)
- Genre: Melodic rap; R&B
- Length: 3:58
- Label: Blackground; Interscope
- Songwriters: Timothy Mosley; Michael Busbee; James Washington; Garland Mosley
- Producers: Timbaland; Jim Beanz

Timbaland singles chronology
"Get Involved" (2010)	"If We Ever Meet Again" (2009)	"Marchin On" (2010)

Katy Perry singles chronology
"Starstrukk" (2009)	"If We Ever Meet Again" (2009)	"California Gurls" (2010)

Music video
- "If We Ever Meet Again ft. Katy Perry" on YouTube

"If We Ever Meet Again" is a song by American producer and rapper Timbaland. It was released on December 1, 2009, as the fourth single from his third studio album Shock Value II (2009). The song features American singer Katy Perry and served as the album's second worldwide single. Timbaland's brother Sebastian also has uncredited vocals at the end of the song. "If We Ever Meet Again" reached number one in New Zealand while peaking within the top 10 in Australia, Austria, Belgium, Canada, France, Germany, Ireland, Israel, Italy, Norway, Poland, Slovakia, Spain, Switzerland, and the United Kingdom. The song was later included on the deluxe edition of Perry's third studio album, Teenage Dream.

== Background ==
Timbaland told MTV News that will.i.am's work on "I Gotta Feeling" by the Black Eyed Peas inspired him to make "If We Ever Meet Again": "When I did this song, I was in love with this record called..... you're gonna be surprised. The record didn't have anything to do with ['If We Ever Meet Again'], but when I heard [the Black Eyed Peas'] "I Gotta Feeling", I said, 'I want a record just like that on my album.' I said, 'I gotta do me a "I Gotta Feeling" record.' Me and one of my producers, Jim Beanz, we came up with this concept. I said, '["I Gotta Feeling"] is happy, but I like it.' It gives a good feeling". On the record, Timbaland sings, instead of raps: "It's not like it's incredible singing, but it made sense for me and it fits my voice," he explained. "To get somebody else to sing it, it might sound too overdone. I like it better with mistakes — I make mistakes. With me singing it, it gives it a different kind of swagger to it". Perry sang the second verse, while Timbaland sang the first verse. In the chorus, both of them sang together. The last rap verse is performed by Timbaland's brother Sebastian, but he is uncredited.

== Music video ==
Timbaland and Katy Perry singing together in the song's music video

The music video was filmed in December 2009. It was directed by Paul Coy Allen, who directed "Morning After Dark" and "Say Something". Timbaland told MTV that he wanted the video to be serious and maybe have Perry playing his guardian angel: "I wanna make something deep, I don't know if I wanna make it like a relationship. I wanna make it like she saved my life with whatever depression I was going through, whether it be drug depression, weight-loss depression — something..... Will she be around if I go through this again?". The song debuted with its video premiere on January 18, 2010, on UK music channels, charting at number one on many of the music channel video charts. The video, rather than focusing on a serious relationship, as mentioned above, focuses on the love story between a jewel thief (Julian Graham) and an art thief (Nadine Heimann), interspersed with Perry and Timbaland singing. In the original video Katy Perry appears in black girdle and black leather as in underwear, while Timbaland in the whole part of the clip was in a brown jacket and with a flat cap on his head. The jewel thief and art thief take note of each other when both are present at an art exhibit opening. The jewel thief steals a necklace, but caches it (rather than trying to remove it from the premises). The jewel thief is later taken in by police for questioning about an art theft, but is released when the art thief secretly returns what she has stolen. As the jewel thief leaves the police station, the art thief is waiting for him outside, and the two join forces (dressed in black clothes and masks) to steal the original necklace and painting from the beginning of the video.

== Chart performance ==
In the Republic of Ireland, "If We Ever Meet Again" entered at number 15 on January 28, 2010, and week later rose to a current peak of number three.

Similarly, in the United Kingdom, the single entered at number 17 on January 31, 2010, and one week later jumped to its peak of number three. The single reached number one in New Zealand on February 15, 2010, ending Stan Walker's 10-week number one reign with "Black Box". The song was at number one for 4 weeks, before it was replaced at number one by J. Williams with "You Got Me".

The song originally peaked on the Billboard Hot 100 at number 98, but then re-entered at number 96 on the issue date April 10, 2010. It has peaked at number 37 in the United States, making it the third highest-charting single on the album.

In Europe, the song was an unmissable success, peaking at number one in Croatia and Czech Republic and top ten in several European countries, including Germany, Switzerland, Scotland, Spain, France, Italy, Poland and Norway, top twenty in Finland, Sweden, Flanders (Belgium) and top thirty in Denmark and the Netherlands.

== Track listing ==
- UK and Europe CD single
1. "If We Ever Meet Again" (international radio edit) – 3:58
2. "If We Ever Meet Again" (Digital Dog radio remix) – 3:35
- UK digital download – EP
1. "If We Ever Meet Again" (international radio edit) – 3:58
2. "If We Ever Meet Again" (Digital Dog radio remix) – 3:26
3. "If We Ever Meet Again" (Chew Fu Deja fix) – 5:07
4. "If We Ever Meet Again" (Starsmith remix) – 5:21
- US digital download – EP
1. "If We Ever Meet Again" (radio edit) – 3:58
2. "If We Ever Meet Again" (album version) – 4:53
3. "If We Ever Meet Again" (instrumental) – 4:21

== Charts ==
=== Weekly charts ===
Weekly chart performance for "If We Ever Meet Again"
Chart (2009–2011)	Peak position
Australia (ARIA)	9
Austria (Ö3 Austria Top 40)	10
Belgium (Ultratop 50 Flanders)	12
Belgium (Ultratop 50 Wallonia)	8
Canada Hot 100 (Billboard)	4
Canada CHR/Top 40 (Billboard)	8
Canada Hot AC (Billboard)	10
CIS Airplay (TopHit)	2
Croatia International Airplay (HRT)	1
Czech Republic Airplay (ČNS IFPI)	1
Denmark (Tracklisten)	22
European Hot 100 Singles (Billboard)	10
Finland (Suomen virallinen lista)	11
France (SNEP)	5
Germany (GfK)	9
Greece Digital Songs (Billboard)	8
Hungary (Rádiós Top 40)	33
Ireland (IRMA)	3
Israel International Airplay (Media Forest)	2
Italy (FIMI)	10
Italy Airplay (EarOne)	24
Netherlands (Dutch Top 40)	11
Netherlands (Single Top 100)	27
New Zealand (Recorded Music NZ)	1
Norway (VG-lista)	7
Poland Airplay (ZPAV)	3
Poland Dance (ZPAV)	21
Portugal Digital Song Sales (Billboard)	6
Russia Airplay (TopHit)	2
Scottish Singles Sales (Official Charts)	3
Slovakia Airplay (ČNS IFPI)	6
Spain (Promusicae)	7
Sweden (Sverigetopplistan)	19
Switzerland (Schweizer Hitparade)	7
UK Singles (Official Charts)	3
US Billboard Hot 100	37
US Pop Airplay (Billboard)	25

=== Year-end charts ===
Year-end chart performance for "If We Ever Meet Again"
Chart (2010)	Position
Australia (ARIA)	58
Austria (Ö3 Austria Top 40)	49
Belgium (Ultratop Flanders)	80
Belgium (Ultratop Wallonia)	53
Canada (Canadian Hot 100)	29
CIS (TopHit)	21
Croatia International Airplay (HRT)	11
European Hot 100 Singles	31
France (SNEP)	33
Germany (Media Control AG)	70
Ireland (IRMA)	18
Italy (FIMI)	37
Italy Airplay (EarOne)	71
Netherlands (Dutch Top 40)	69
Netherlands (Single Top 100)	52
New Zealand (Recorded Music NZ)	9
Romania (Romanian Top 100)	98
Russia Airplay (TopHit)	31
Spain (PROMUSICAE)	48
Switzerland (Schweizer Hitparade)	52
UK Singles (Official Charts Company)	37

== Certifications and sales ==
Region	Certification	Certified units/sales
Australia (ARIA)	Platinum	70,000^{^}
Canada (Music Canada)	2× Platinum	160,000^{‡}
Finland	Platinum	4,000
France	—	100,100 (Note: France sales figures as of December 2014.)
Germany (BVMI)	Gold	150,000^{‡}
Italy (FIMI)	Gold	15,000^{*}
New Zealand (RMNZ)	3× Platinum	90,000^{‡}
Spain (Promusicae)	Gold	20,000^{*}
Switzerland (IFPI Switzerland)	Gold	15,000^{^}
United Kingdom (BPI)	Platinum	434,000 (Note: United Kingdom sales figures as of May 2017.)
United States	—	882,000 (Note: United States sales figures as of June 2011.)
^{*} Sales figures based on certification alone.^{^} Shipments figures based on certification alone.^{‡} Sales+streaming figures based on certification alone.

== Release history ==
Release dates and formats for "If We Ever Meet Again"
Region	Date	Format	Version	Label	Ref.
Various	December 1, 2009	Digital download	Original	Blackground; Interscope	
France	February 15, 2010	Digital download	Original	Blackground; Interscope	
United States	February 16, 2010	Contemporary hit radio	Original	Mosley; Interscope	
Germany	February 26, 2010	CD	2-track	Interscope; Universal	
