= Timbaland =

American record producer (born 1972)

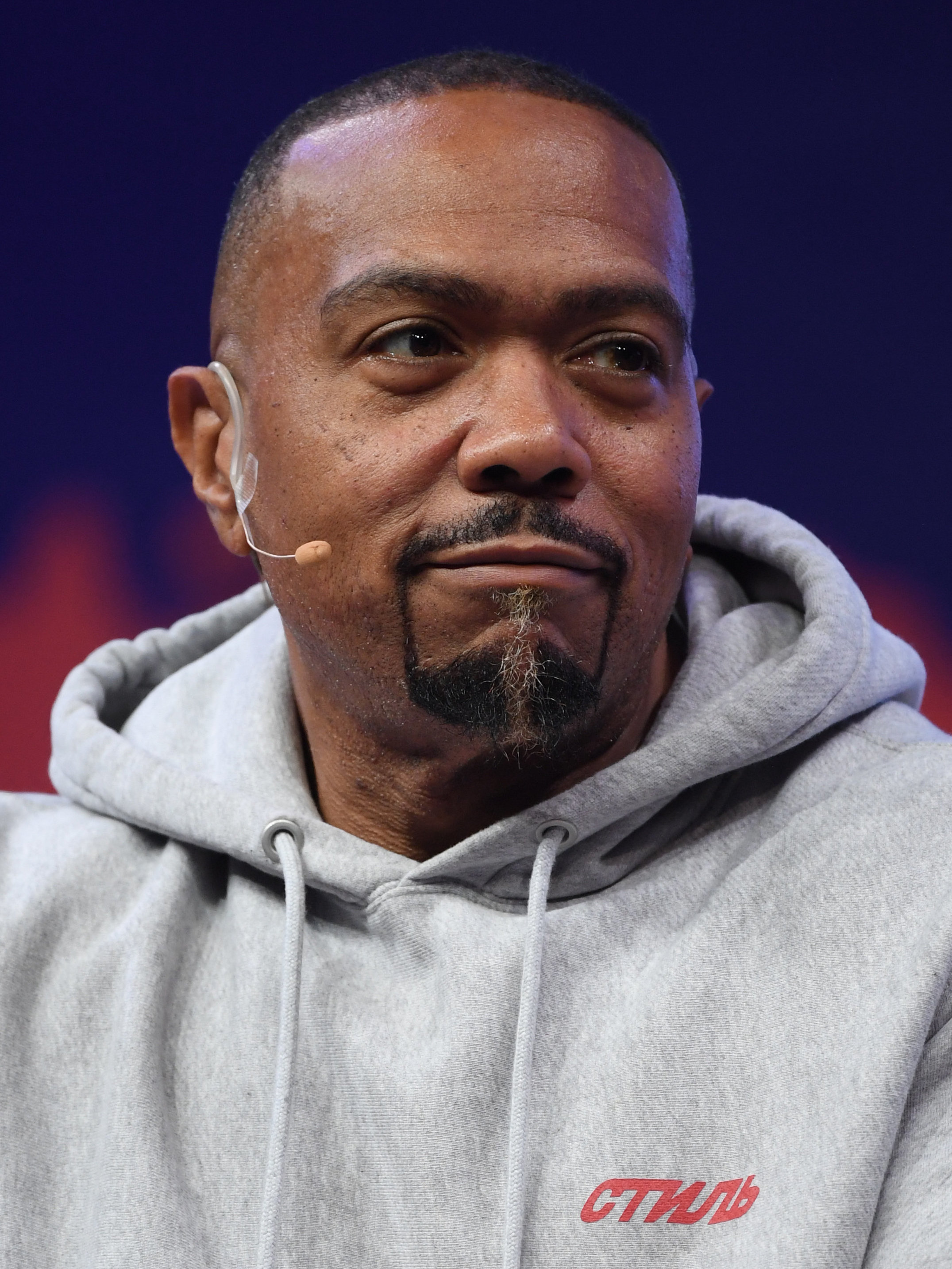
- Timbaland in 2019
- Born: Timothy Zachery Mosley; March 10, 1972 (age 54); Norfolk, Virginia, U.S.
- Other names: DJ Timmy Tim; Timbo; Timar; Emperor of Sound; Mozart Timadeas
- Occupations: Record producer; rapper; singer; songwriter
- Years active: 1990—present
- Works: Discography; production
- Children: 4
- Relatives: Pharrell Williams (cousin)
- Awards: Full list
- Musical career
- Genres: Hip hop; R&B; pop
- Labels: Gamma; Def Jam; Roc Nation; Epic; Mosley Music; Interscope; Beat Club; Atlantic; Blackground; Stage Zero
- Formerly of: Swing Mob; Timbaland & Magoo
- Website: timbaland.com

Timothy Zachery Mosley (born March 10, 1972), known professionally as Timbaland, is an American record producer, rapper, singer and songwriter. Born and raised in Norfolk, Virginia, he is widely acclaimed for his distinctive production work and "stuttering" rhythmic style. In 2007, Entertainment Weekly stated that "just about every current pop trend can be traced back to him—from sultry, urban-edged R&B songstresses [...] to the art of incorporating avant-garde sounds into No. 1 hits." He has won four Grammy Awards from 22 nominations.

Timbaland's first major production credit was on the album Ginuwine... the Bachelor (1996) by R&B singer Ginuwine. Further commercial success on his following productions—including Aaliyah's album One in a Million (1996) and Missy Elliott's album Supa Dupa Fly (1997)—made him a sought-after producer for R&B and hip-hop acts. He performed as a recording artist himself while doing so, releasing three albums as part of the Virginia-based hip-hop duo Timbaland & Magoo, along with his debut solo album, Tim's Bio (1998). He produced Justin Timberlake's 2002 single "Cry Me a River", and thereafter produced the majority of Timberlake's subsequent releases—including FutureSex/LoveSounds (2006) and The 20/20 Experience (2013)—along with their respective hit singles.

Timbaland's 2007 single "Give It To Me" (featuring Nelly Furtado and Justin Timberlake) peaked atop the Billboard Hot 100 and preceded the release of his second album, Shock Value (2007). It spawned the singles "The Way I Are" (featuring Keri Hilson) and "Apologize" (with OneRepublic), which peaked at numbers three and two on the chart, respectively. His third album, Shock Value II (2009), was supported by the top 40 singles "Carry Out" (featuring Justin Timberlake), "Say Something" (featuring Drake) and "If We Ever Meet Again" (with Katy Perry). Meanwhile, Timbaland's production credits throughout this time expanded to include songs for Michael Jackson, Jay-Z, Beyoncé, Madonna, Kanye West, Rihanna, Alicia Keys, and Lil Wayne, among others.

Timbaland founded the record labels Beat Club in 2001 and its successor, Mosley Music Group in 2006, through which he has signed artists including Nelly Furtado—whose album Loose (2006) peaked the Billboard 200—as well as OneRepublic, Keri Hilson, Bubba Sparxxx, and Chris Cornell. Beat Club is namesake of a service in which Timbaland mentors upcoming producers, launched in 2020. Along with fellow producer Swizz Beatz, he co-created the webcast series Verzuz that same year.

== Early life ==
Timothy Zachery Mosley was born on March 10, 1972, in Norfolk, Virginia, to Latrice, who ran a homeless shelter, and Garland Mosley, an Amtrak employee. He graduated from Salem High School of Virginia Beach. During his time as a DJ, he was known as "DJ Tim" or "DJ Timmy Tim". He has a younger brother named Sebastian. His sister Courtney Rashon is a makeup artist and an author from New Jersey. While attending high school, Timbaland began a long-term collaboration with rapper Melvin (Magoo) Barcliff. The teenage Mosley also joined the production ensemble S.B.I. (which stood for 'Surrounded By Idiots') which also featured Neptunes producer, his cousin, Pharrell Williams. Mosley was also high school friends with brothers Terrence and Gene Thornton, who would become known as Pusha T and Malice of the rap group Clipse, respectively. In 1986, when Timbaland was 14 years old, he was accidentally shot by a co-worker at a local Red Lobster restaurant and was partially paralyzed for nine months. During this time, he began to learn how to DJ using his left hand.

== Career ==
=== 1992–2005 ===
Rapper Missy Elliott heard Timbaland's material after being introduced by Magoo. She and her R&B group, Sista, auditioned for DeVante Swing, a producer and member of the R&B act Jodeci. DeVante signed Sista to his Swing Mob record label and Elliott brought Mosley and Barcliff along with her to New York, where Swing Mob was based. It was DeVante who renamed the young producer Timbaland after the Timberland boot. He and Magoo became part of Devante Swings's label called Swing Mob. The label featured signees known as "Da Bassment" crew, joining artists such as R&B singer Ginuwine, male vocal group Playa (Smoke E. Digglera, Static Major and Digital Black), and the girl group Sugah which members included Rolita White, Susan Weems, and Charlene "Tweet" Keys. Timbaland did production work on a number of projects with DeVante, including the 1995 Jodeci LP The Show, The After-Party, The Hotel, and Sista's (unreleased) début LP 4 All the Sistas Around da World. Elliott began receiving recognition as a songwriter for artists such as R&B girl group 702 and MC Lyte. Due to Timbaland's connection with her, he was often contacted to produce remixes of her songs.

Timbaland began his producing career for R&B acts. In the early to mid-1990s, he produced a few songs for R&B acts such as Jodeci and Sista. In 1996, he made his mainstream breakthrough by producing the majority of both Aaliyah's second album One in a Million and Ginuwine's debut album Ginuwine...the Bachelor. This included the major hit singles "If Your Girl Only Knew" by Aaliyah and "Pony" by Ginuwine. While Timbaland was initially producing for R&B artists, his trademark sound was very much rooted in hip-hop with its fast-paced nature and clear drum breaks. He was taking a hip-hop sound and applying it to R&B, and in this way his sound was instrumental in blurring the distinction between hip-hop and R&B production. In 1997, he fully produced Supa Dupa Fly, the debut album of Missy Elliott, who had been a childhood friend of Mosley. In this album Timbaland continued with his now trademark electronic production style, but since Missy frequently rapped the music was considered hip-hop. Also in 1997, he released his first album with his partner Magoo, Welcome to Our World, also a hip-hop album. In the late 1990s, his hip-hop production sound would become very influential and common as he produced for many high-profile hip-hop artists including Jay-Z, Nas, and The LOX. In 1999, he scored a major hit with Jay-Z and rap group UGK with the hit "Big Pimpin'". He also fully produced Missy's second album in 1999, Da Real World. During this time, Timbaland continued to produce primarily for R&B artists. He continued to produce for Ginuwine, Tank, Aaliyah, as well as contributing significantly to albums by Xscape, Nicole, and Total. He remixed Usher's major hit "You Make Me Wanna". In the early 2000s Timbaland produced songs including Ludacris' "Roll Out (My Business)", Jay-Z's "Hola' Hovito", Petey Pablo's "Raise Up", and Beck's cover of David Bowie's "Diamond Dogs" during this period. He also contributed three songs, all eventually released as singles, to Aaliyah's self-titled third album, the exotic lead single "We Need a Resolution" (featuring himself rapping a verse), "More Than a Woman", and the ballad "I Care 4 U". He also makes an appearance in Aaliyah's single "Try Again", which he also produced and co-wrote.

Timbaland & Magoo's second album together was slated for release in November 2000. Indecent Proposal was to feature appearances by Beck, Aaliyah, as well as new Timbaland protégés—some from his new Beat Club Records imprint--Ms. Jade, Kiley Dean, Sebastian (Timbaland's brother), Petey Pablo, and Tweet (who was a member of Sugah during the Swing Mob days). The album was delayed for an entire year, finally released in November 2001. It was a commercial disappointment. Beck's vocals for the track "I Am Music" were not included on the last version, which instead featured Timbaland singing along with Steve "Static" Garrett of Playa and Aaliyah. The first release on Beat Club was the début album by Bubba Sparxxx in September 2001, Dark Days, Bright Nights. The loss of Aaliyah deeply affected Timbaland. In a phone call to the MTV show Total Request Live, Timbaland said:

She was like blood, and I lost blood. Me and her together had this chemistry. I kinda lost half of my creativity to her. It's hard for me to talk to the fans now. Beyond the music, she was a brilliant person, the [most special] person I ever met.

— Timbaland, MTV

Timbaland contributed three tracks to Tweet's debut album, Southern Hummingbird, and produced most of Missy Elliott's fourth and fifth LPs, Under Construction and This Is Not a Test! He also produced tracks for artists such as Lil' Kim ("The Jump Off") and southern rapper Pastor Troy during this period. Collaborating with fellow producer Scott Storch, Timbaland also worked on a number of tracks on former *NSYNC lead singer Justin Timberlake's solo debut, Justified, including the song "Cry Me a River".

Late in 2003, Timbaland delivered the second Bubba Sparxxx album, Deliverance, and the third Timbaland & Magoo album, Under Construction, Part II Both albums were released to little fanfare or acclaim even though Deliverance was praised by reviews and embraced by the internet community. In 2004, Timbaland produced singles for LL Cool J, Xzibit, Fatman Scoop, and Jay-Z, and he produced the bulk of Brandy's fourth album, Afrodisiac. Timbaland co-wrote two tracks ("Exodus '04" and "Let Me Give You My Love") and produced three tracks of the American-Japanese Pop star Hikaru Utada's second English album, Exodus. He continued working on tracks for Tweet and for Elliott's sixth album, The Cookbook: "Joy (feat. Mike Jones)", and "Partytime" and continued to expand his reach with production for The Game and Jennifer Lopez ("He'll Be Back" from her fourth studio album, Rebirth).

=== 2006–2011 ===
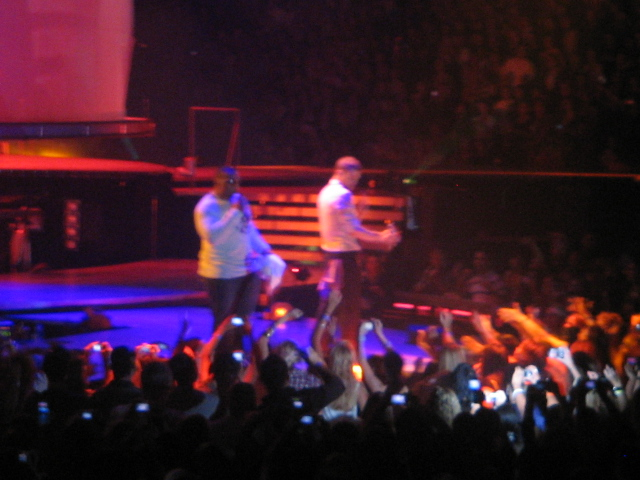
Timbaland and Justin Timberlake performing "SexyBack" during Timberlake's 2007 FutureSex/LoveShow concert tour

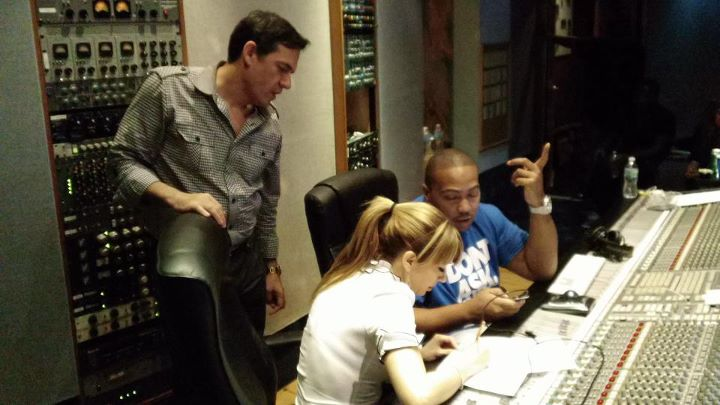
Timbaland (blue shirt) in the recording studio

Timbaland started a new label, Mosley Music Group along with old friend and legendary Australian music producer John Servedio, also known as his stage name 'ServidSounds' who helped Timbaland bring in some talent from his former Beat Club Records label. On the new label were Nelly Furtado, Keri Hilson, and rapper D.O.E. In 2006 he produced Justin Timberlake's second solo studio album FutureSex/LoveSounds. His vocals feature on the songs "SexyBack", "Sexy Ladies", "Chop Me Up", "What Goes Around... Comes Around" and on the prelude to "My Love" entitled "Let Me Talk to You". Timbaland provided vocals on several singles: The Pussycat Dolls' "Wait a Minute", Nelly Furtado's "Promiscuous", "Ice Box" by Omarion and Justin Timberlake's "SexyBack". In an interview published in August 2006 in the UK Timbaland revealed he was working on a new LP by Jay-Z and that he had worked on tracks with Coldplay's Chris Martin.

Timbaland worked on seven songs for Björk's 2007 album, Volta, including "Earth Intruders", "Hope", and "Innocence" and he later worked on tracks for the new Duran Duran album, Red Carpet Massacre, including one featuring his frequent collaborator Justin Timberlake. Later in the year, Timbaland produced songs for Bone Thugs-n-Harmony's LP, Strength & Loyalty and the song "Ayo Technology" on 50 Cent's album Curtis. Timbaland also produced most of the tracks on Ashlee Simpson's third CD, Bittersweet World, including the song "Outta My Head (Ay Ya Ya)". On April 3, 2007, Timbaland released a collaboration album featuring artists including 50 Cent, Dr. Dre, Elton John, Fall Out Boy, Nelly Furtado, Missy Elliott, and others called Shock Value. A rivalry flared up between Timbaland and record producer Scott Storch in early 2007. The tension initially started on the single "Give It to Me", when Timbaland anonymously backlashed Storch: "I'm a real producer and you['re] just the piano man". In an interview, Timbaland confirmed that he was talking about Storch. The dispute partly stemmed from controversy regarding writing credits for Timberlake's "Cry Me a River".

Timbaland helped produce many albums for various artists in 2008, including Madonna's Hard Candy, Ashlee Simpson's Bittersweet World, Keri Hilson's In a Perfect World, Flo Rida's Mail on Sunday, Letoya Luckett's Lady Love, Lindsay Lohan's Spirit in the Dark, Chris Cornell's Scream, JoJo's All I Want Is Everything, Nicole Scherzinger's Her Name Is Nicole, Missy Elliott's Block Party, Matt Pokora's MP3, Keithian's Dirrty Pop, The Pussycat Dolls's Doll Domination, Busta Rhymes's B.O.M.B, Lisa Maffia's Miss Boss, Teairra Mari's Pressed for Time, Jennifer Hudson's self-titled debut album, Dima Bilan's Believe, Samantha Jade's My Name Is Samantha Jade, New Kids on the Block's The Block, and Keshia Chanté's Night & Day. Timbaland produced the Russian entry for the Eurovision Song Contest 2008, "Believe" by Dima Bilan, which was co-written by Bilan and Jim Beanz. The song then won the contest when it was held in Belgrade, Serbia in May 2008. In February 2008 the first Fashion Against AIDS collection -an initiative of Designers Against AIDS and sold in H&M stores in 28 countries- was launched, for which Timbaland designed a T-shirt print, posed for the campaign and spoke out in a video, to help raise HIV/AIDS awareness among urban youth and to advocate safe sex. On February 8, 2008, it was announced that Timbaland would be releasing an album exclusively for Verizon Wireless's V CAST cell phone service and was designated its very first "Mobile Producer in Residence". Timbaland was to be joined by Mosley Music Group/Zone 4 singer and songwriter Keri Hilson to begin work on the mobile album's first track aboard the fully equipped Mobile Recording Studio. The only track to surface so far is Garry Barry Larry Harry "Get It Girl". In Timbaland's first effort within the video game industry, he worked with Rockstar Games to produce Beaterator, a music mixing game for the PlayStation Portable, PlayStation Network, and iOS released in the September 2009.

Timbaland spoke to MTV's Shaheem Reid in July 2008 to confirm that he was working on the follow-up to his platinum selling Shock Value. At the time he confirmed that he had one track with Madonna which although recorded for her album Hard Candy it had not been used and could end up on this album instead. He was insistent that he would also collaborate with Jordin Sparks, Beyoncé, Rihanna, Jonas Brothers, Miley Cyrus and T.I. However, none of these collaborations (except Miley Cyrus) made it to the final track list. He also said that alongside T-Pain who would definitely appear, he hoped to get Jay-Z on board, although he ultimately failed to do so. Timbaland began working on the sequel to Shock Value in July 2008. In March 2009, he filed a lawsuit against his label, Blackground Records, alleging that they attempted to blackball him after he decided to move from music performance into production.

In September 2009, Timbaland announced that Shock Value II would be released on November 23 in Europe and November 24 in North America. However, it was pushed back to December 8, preceded by the first single, which featured a new recording artist named SoShy entitled "Morning After Dark". New featured guest appearances on the album included DJ Felli Fel, Justin Timberlake, JoJo, Bran'Nu, Drake, Chad Kroeger, Sebastian, Miley Cyrus, Melody Thornton, Nelly Furtado, Katy Perry, Esthero, The Fray, Jet, Daughtry, OneRepublic, Keri Hilson, Attitude and D.O.E.. Ultimately Madonna, the Jonas Brothers, Rihanna, Usher, Jay-Z, Beyoncé, Kanye West, Linkin Park, The All-American Rejects, Paramore, Gucci Mane, T-Pain, T.I. and Akon never appeared on Shock Value II. Shock Value II is infamous for its use of over-the-top vocal effects.

"Morning After Dark" featuring SoShy and Nelly Furtado is the lead single from Timbaland's third studio album. The song was written by Tim Mosley, Jerome Harmon, Deborah Epstein, Michelle Bell, Keri Hilson, Nelly Furtado, James Washington, John Maultsby and produced by Timbaland and Jroc. The single premiered on October 16, 2009, on Ryan Seacrest's KIIS-FM radio show, On-Air with Ryan Seacrest with Timbaland describing it as the kick-off song from the project. Following her performance, the song was sent for radio adds on May 25. The song peaked in the top 10 of the Billboard Hot 100. With this success, the song became Sparks' fifth consecutive top 20 hit and third nonconsecutive top 10 hit. On May 24, Sparks headed to Europe to begin promotion for the single. "Say Something" featuring Canadian rapper Drake was released to US iTunes on November 3, 2009. It was officially sent to U.S. radio on January 5, 2010. It is the album's second single and reached number 23 on the Hot 100, making it the second most successful single on the album. "Carry Out" featuring Justin Timberlake is the third single from the album but was initially only released in the U.S. It was sent to US radio on December 1, 2009. It is the most successful single on the album, peaking at number 11 on the Billboard Hot 100. The music video premiered on February 18, 2010. It was released as the third UK single on April 26, 2010. "If We Ever Meet Again" featuring Katy Perry is the album's fourth single. The music video premiered on January 18, 2010. In the UK, it was released February 15, 2010.

Timbaland produced Chris Cornell's 2009 album Scream. Shakira was asked to record vocals on the song "Give It Up to Me" to be included on Timbaland's forthcoming album but it was placed on her third studio album She Wolf and released as the second US single instead. One of the songs Timbaland had produced for Beyoncé's 2008 album I Am... Sasha Fierce was reworked by Keri Hilson and Jay-Z for Shock Value II but not included. He was a guest host of WWE's Raw on December 28, 2009. Timbaland appeared on March 25, 2010, episode (titled "Blowback") of FlashForward as an evidence agent.

In April 2010, a feud arose between the producer and R&B singer Ginuwine, after Timbaland failed to make an appearance at the singer's music video shoot of "Get Involved". Later in April, Timbaland released a new single featuring T-Pain and Billy Blue titled "Talk That". In June 2010, when questioned by RWD magazine about the UK music scene he made the bold claim to be the inspiration for the dubstep music scene. "The UK scene... they're always telling me that I started it. You have Dub-bass...". When questioned further about it he went on to say: "It's funny cos they went back to some of my old music that really created that sound and just, instead of going fast, they went slow with more bass." In August 2010, a "possible suicide attempt" APB was put out for Timbaland after his home was burgled. When his family were unable to contact him, they called 911 and a manhunt began. Police eventually found his car and brought him back home, where paramedics examined him, before declaring he was not a threat to himself. When questioned, Timbaland said he only took a drive to think about the burglary, as he thought the possible thief could have been someone close whom he trusted.

In 2010, Timbaland split with longtime label Blackground Records, but stayed with Interscope Records. Later in the year, Timbaland was featured on the deluxe edition of Chris Brown's album, F.A.M.E., producing the songs "Paper, Scissors, Rock" (feat. Big Sean) and the Japan-only bonus track, "Talk Ya Ear Off". Timbaland was also featured on David Guetta's LP, Nothing But the Beat, on "I Just Wanna F" with Dev and Afrojack. Timbaland also worked with teen star Demi Lovato; he produced and had a small feature in her song "All Night Long" on Lovato's Unbroken album. In November 2010, Timbaland announced that he would be releasing a new song every Thursday, called Timbo Thursdays; a copy of the initiative shown by artists such as Kanye West (via G.O.O.D. Fridays), and Swizz Beatz (via Monster Mondays). In an interview with Rap-Up.com Timbaland stated, "So, my brother told me Kanye is puttin' out a new song every Friday called G.O.O.D. Fridays, Swizz got Mondays, I don't know if they are on Twitter but can you hit them up, and tell them reserve that Thursday for Timbo the king baby. We'll call it Timbo Thursday, cool?"

=== 2011–2019 ===
On January 14, 2011, Timbaland began his Timbaland Thursdays free music initiative, with the first song released being "Take Ur Clothes Off", featuring Missy Elliott. The first official single from Shock Value III, "Pass at Me" featuring American rapper Pitbull, with uncredited production by French DJ David Guetta, was released on September 14, 2011, after having been previously used to promote a book titled Culo. The album's second single, "Break Ya Back" featuring American singer Dev, was released on April 17, 2012. For the fourth installment in the Step Up franchise, Step Up Revolution, Timbaland released a track called "Hands In the Air", which features American singer Ne-Yo.

On January 30, 2014, Timbaland signed to Jay-Z's label Roc Nation. Later that year, Timbaland would serve as the main producer of Justin Timberlake's recent LP, The 20/20 Experience, including the album's singles: "Suit & Tie" and "Mirrors". Timbaland also produced Beyoncé's song "Grown Woman" which was featured in her Pepsi commercial and 2014 tour, The Mrs. Carter Show World Tour, and the song "I Don't Have To Sleep to Dream" on Cher's 2014 album Closer to the Truth.

In April 2011, Timbaland and long time friend and business partner Mike Evans signed a deal to with Sony/ATV Music Publishing's Extreme Music to create 75 new urban pop tracks for the production music house.

In August 2013, Timbaland revealed that he was working on a project featuring unreleased material by Michael Jackson, with a lead single called "Love Never Felt So Good".

On September 24, 2013, Timbaland collaborated with T.I. for his new co-produced Indonesian artist, AGNEZ MO, in her song titled Coke Bottle. The premiere launch event of the single became a worldwide trending topic on Twitter.

On November 15, 2013, Timbaland released his first single for his fourth album, Opera Noir, called "Know Bout Me" featuring Drake, Jay-Z, and James Fauntleroy. By 2014, it was originally announced that both Timbaland and Missy Elliott would be an essential component per production of Kat Dahlia's debut album, My Garden, however neither of the duo's contributions saw the light of day. On January 7, 2015, Timbaland received production credit for his involvement with the musical score of Lee Daniels and Danny Strong's television project Empire, which premiered on FOX. Constructively, Timbaland and his team, including Jim Beanz, Raphael Saadiq, and others, compose the series' songs based on material given to them by the show's writing team per each episode.

In February 2016, Timbaland and Missy Elliott teamed up to produce the track "Somebody Else Will" for longtime associate, Tweet, for her third studio album Charlene.

Timbaland collaborated with singer and songwriter Dalton Diehl to create Harmony which serves as the opening to Skylanders Academy, the animated Netflix series based on Activision Blizzard's toys to life spinoff to the Spyro series.

In June 2016, Timbaland and Andy Rubinhas teamed up with SubPac, a Los Angeles-based startup working on a wearable sound device. There is still no release date for his new album Textbook Timbo. On December 15, 2017, Timbaland released the song "Grab the Wheel", which features 6lack on vocals. The song also has a music video which was released on the same day.

In 2019, Timbaland began teaching through Masterclass, providing an instructional series on production and beatmaking.

=== 2020–present: Verzuz and AI usage ===
In March 2020, Timbaland, along with Swizz Beatz, launched the Verzuz Instagram webcast series. In 2021, for their work on Verzuz, both Timbaland and Swizz Beatz appeared on the Time 100, Time's annual list of the 100 most influential people in the world.

In August 2021, Blackground rebranded as Blackground 2.0, with Barry Hankerson remaining as founder. Blackground 2.0 signed a distribution deal with Empire Distribution, which will re-release the label's catalogue on CD, cassette and vinyl, onto digital download sites and, for the first time ever, streaming services. Aaliyah's catalogue began its re-release in chronological order, starting with One In a Million on August 20, 2021. Timbaland's 1998 LP Tim's Bio: Life from da Bassment and Timbaland & Magoo albums Welcome to Our World, Indecent Proposal and Under Construction, Part II were re-released August 27, 2021.

On 1 September 2023, Timbaland released the single "Keep Going Up", in collaboration with Furtado and Timberlake. On 20 October 2023, Timbaland released the single "My Way" with singer Anna Margo. He released the single "Desire" with singer VITA on November 17, 2023.

In April 2024, an unreleased track produced by Timbaland and Rock Mafia titled "Karma's a Bitch" by Brit Smith surfaced after it was re-recorded the same year by JoJo Siwa as "Karma". On November 22, 2024, he released the single "If It Wasn't Up To Me", alongside Zefaan. On December 5, 2024, Timbaland released his musical meditation album, Yellow, in collaboration with Malte Marten. On March 28, 2025, Timbaland released the afrobeats instrumental album, Timbo Progression. Accusations of AI use have been levelled against Timbaland for the album; Timbaland himself had introduced an AI character in June 2025, Tata Taktumi, and has partnered with AI music platform Suno AI, something which has been heavily criticized, especially his claim that "AI music has more soul than new artists". On December 5, 2025, "Rack It Up", was released. The song is by Timbaland's AI creation Tata Taktumi and rapper Fivio Foreign.

In January 2026, Timbaland teamed up with cheese brand Babybel to produce limited edition 3-inch vinyl records, Mini Wax Tracks, featuring pop and EDM remixes of Timbaland's "I'm Your Baby". Timbaland said of the collaboration, "Working with Babybel on Mini Wax Tracks was just pure fun. I wanted to keep the playful energy of "I'm Your Baby" while adding my own sound. It's creative, unexpected, and all about bringing good energy to something small but mighty." On July 6, 2026, Timbaland appeared in a Missy Elliott-curated Aaliyah tribute, speaking via a video montage, for the finale at that year's Essence Festival of Culture. On July 23, 2026, Timbaland's collaboration with The Game, YG and Swizz Beatz, "Red People", was released.

== Legacy ==
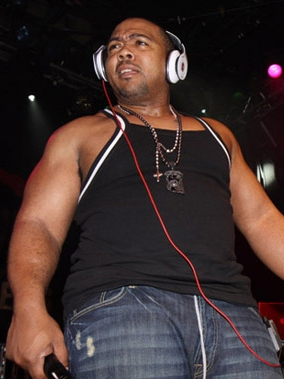
Timbaland performing in West Hollywood in January 2010

An important figure in the creation of American R&B's "stuttering kick-drums template", Timbaland's influence extended beyond the U.S. and crossed international borders, especially in UK garage and rave culture. Timbaland, as an R&B producer, created a distinctive, rhythmic sound using breakbeats, which break up the smooth flow of tracks to create moments of tension and release. This technique that Timbaland pioneered would later serve to create "bootleg" garage tracks, which was essential in the rise of UK garage. What began as an underground movement soon grew in popularity, with bootleg remixes selling upwards of 20,000 copies, something unheard of at the time. One such example is the remix of Brandy & Monica's "The Boy Is Mine". Timbaland is credited along with other Virginia artists such as The Clipse, Pharrell Williams and Missy Elliott with establishing Virginia as one of the East Coast's strongholds in hip-hop.

== Plagiarism accusations ==
Aaliyah's 2001 song "More Than a Woman", produced by Timbaland, contained an uncredited sample of "Alouli Ansa" by Mayada El-Hennawy.

In January 2007, Timbaland was alleged to have plagiarized several elements (both motifs and samples) in the song "Do It" on the 2006 album Loose by Nelly Furtado without giving credit or compensation. The song itself was released as the fifth North American single from Loose in July 2007.

Timbaland's legal troubles continued. In lieu of a copyright lawsuit over the song "Throw It on Me" from his Shock Value album, Timbaland and David Cortopassi, the composer of "Spazz", a song originally recorded by The Elastik Band and released by ATCO/Atlantic and EMI, reached a settlement agreement in July 2009. The terms of the settlement remained undisclosed at the time.

In January 2014, the Swiss newspaper Basler Zeitung revealed another plagiarism case concerning the track "Versus" by Jay-Z, which was produced by Timbaland. The track's instrumental is very similar to, if not directly sampled from, "On the Way" by Swiss musician Bruno Spoerri. According to Swiss newspaper Tages-Anzeiger, the plagiarism case was settled by March 2015. Jay-Z and Timbaland were to pay 50% from the song's revenue to Spoerri as royalties for the music, with Jay-Z retaining 50% for the lyrics.

== Discography ==
Studio albums

- Tim's Bio: Life from da Bassment (1998)
- Shock Value (2007)
- Shock Value II (2009)
- Yellow (with Malte Marten) (2024)
- Timbo Progression (2025)
- SEVEN TRUMPETS (with 1K Phew) (2026)
