= Jim Beanz =

American producer and songwriter (born 1980)

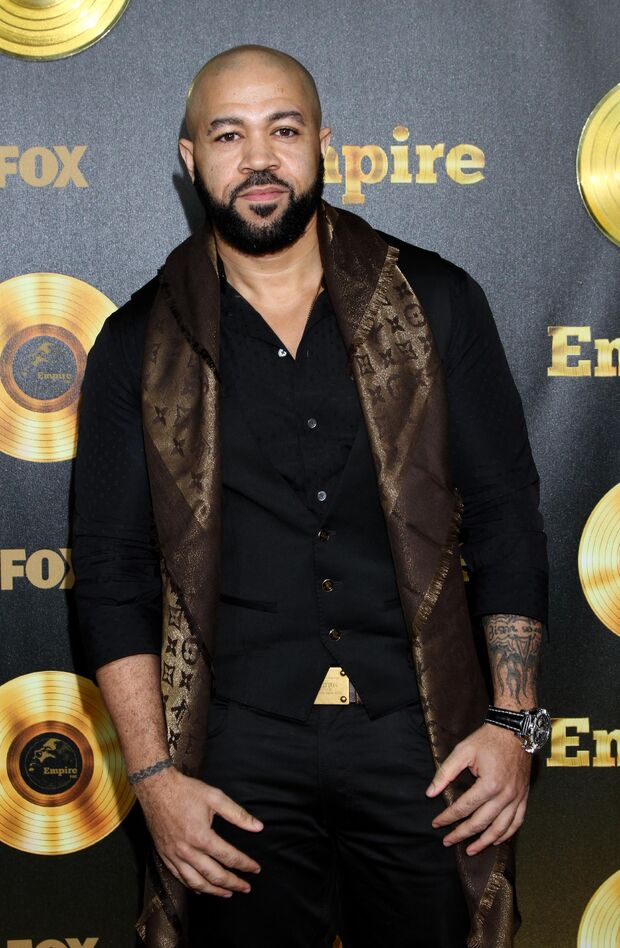
- Beanz in 2015

Background information
- Born: August 26, 1980 (age 46); Harrisburg, Pennsylvania
- Occupations: Vocal producer, record producer, songwriter, vocalist
- Labels: Timbaland, Reservoir

James David Washington (born August 26, 1980), known professionally as Jim BEANZ, is an American music producer, songwriter, singer and record producer from Harrisburg, Pennsylvania.

== Biography ==
Beanz began his career when he was an artist in the R&B group "Tresan", during which time he received mentorship from Dru Hill. In 2005, he started working alongside Timbaland as a vocal producer. He co-wrote the winning entry of the Eurovision Song Contest 2008, "Believe" by Dima Bilan. Beanz also wrote and produced songs on the first season of the FOX series Empire and portrayed the rapper "Titan."

== Credits ==
=== 2004 ===
==== Hair Show Soundtrack ====
- Khaliya Williams "Wanna Get With You"

=== 2005 ===
==== El Feco ====
- "Like It Like That"

==== Apache Indian – Time For Change ====
- 18. "A Prayer For Change" (featuring Gunjan)

==== Shakira – Oral Fixation Vol. 2 ====
- 05. "Animal City" – co-producer

==== Jamie Foxx – Unpredictable ====
- 05. "Can I Take U Home" – background vocals

=== 2006 ===
==== Kulcha Don – It's All About You ====
- 07 "Say So"

==== Nelly Furtado – Loose ====
- 01. "Afraid" (featuring Attitude)
- 02. "Maneater" – vocal producer, co-writer, background vocals
- 03. "Promiscuous" (featuring Timbaland)– vocal producer, background vocals
- 04. "Glow"
- 05. "Showtime" – vocal producer, background vocals
- 06. "No Hay Igual" – vocal producer, background vocals
- 08. "Say It Right" – vocal producer, background vocals
- 09. "Do It" – vocal producer
- 11. "Wait For You" – vocal producer
- 13. "All Good Things (Come to an End)" – vocal producer, background vocals
- Maneater (Jim Beanz Bhangra Remix) (featuring Amar) – producer
- Promiscuous (Jim Beanz Bhangra Remix) (featuring Amar & Timbaland) – producer, background vocals

==== Danity Kane – Danity Kane ====
- 03. "Want It" – vocal producer, co-writer
- 04. "Right Now" – vocal producer, co-writer

==== Fergie – The Dutchess ====
- unknown tracks with Timbaland

==== Diddy – Press Play ====
- 14. "After Love" (featuring Keri Hilson) – co-writer

==== Gwen Stefani – The Sweet Escape ====
- "Fast Lane"
- unknown tracks with Timbaland

==== Fantasia – Fantasia ====
- 12. "Bore Me (Yawn)" – co-writer

=== 2007 ===
==== Katharine McPhee – Katharine McPhee ====
- 01. "Love Story" – vocal producer
- 03. "Open Toes" – vocal producer
- 05. "Not Ur Girl" – vocal producer
- 06. "Each Other" – vocal producer
- 07. "Dangerous" – vocal producer
- 11. "Neglected" – vocal producer, background vocals

==== Timbaland – Timbaland Presents Shock Value ====
- 03. "Release" (featuring Justin Timberlake) – background vocals
- 06. "Come And Get Me" (featuring 50 Cent & Tony Yayo) – background vocals
- 12. "Bombay" (featuring Amar & Jim Beanz)

==== Lady Ru – My Addiction ====
- 01. "My Addiction" (featuring Amar)
- 02. "Snake Charmer" (featuring El Feco)
- 03. "Hands Up" (featuring Kuf Knotz & Azyah)
- 04. "Got Me (Burnin' Up)" (featuring Apache Indian, Shahin Badir & Leseya Lee)
- 05. "Catch Me" (featuring Taz)
- 06. "Your Woman"

All Produced by Jim Beanz

- 07. "Chances Are" (featuring Channi Singh) – additional vocal producer
- 11. "Mr. DJ" (featuring Leseya Lee) – vocal producer, co-writer
- 12. "You & Me" (featuring Kino) – co-writer
- "My Man" (featuring Anjali & Mana)
- "My Obsession" (featuring Gunjan)
- "So Hot" (featuring Ms. Jade & Apache Indian)
- "So Many Ways" (featuring Kufie The MC)

==== Mutya Buena Real Girl ====
- "Heat"
- "Wanna Be"

==== M.I.A. – K A L A ====
- 12. "Come Around" (featuring Timbaland)

==== Britney Spears – Blackout ====
- 01. "Gimme More" – vocal producer, co-writer, background vocals
- 04. "Break The Ice" – vocal producer, co-writer, background vocals
- 06. "Get Naked (I Got A Plan)" – vocal producer, co-writer
- 09. "Hot As Ice" – vocal producer, background vocals
- 11. "Perfect Lover" – vocal producer, co-writer, background vocals
- 13. "Outta This World" – vocal producer, co-writer
- 15. "Get Back" – vocal producer, background vocals

==== Duran Duran – Red Carpet Massacre ====
- 03. "Nite Runner" – additional vocals
- 05. "Box Full O' Honey" – vocal producer
- 09. "Zoom In" – vocal producer
- 10. "She's Too Much" – vocal producer, background vocals
- 11. "Dirty Great Monster" – vocal producer
- 12. "Last Man Standing" – vocal producer

==== Test Drive ====
- "Drive Me Crazy" (featuring Sebastian) – vocal producer, co-writer

=== 2008 ===
==== Keri Hilson ====
- "Get It Girl" – background vocals

==== Danity Kane – Welcome to the Dollhouse ====
- 02. "Bad Girl" (featuring Missy Elliott) – vocal producer, co-writer, background vocals
- 03. "Damaged" – vocal producer
- 05. "Strip Tease" – vocal producer, co-writer
- 12. "Poetry" – vocal producer

Credits on the first run of this album are wrong, Jim Beanz was the vocal producer on 90% of Danity Kane album. As seen in Making the Band 4, Season 2.

==== Matt Pokora – MP3 ====
- 01. "Dangerous" (featuring Sebastian & Timbaland) – vocal producer, co-writer
- 02. "Catch Me If You Can" – vocal producer, co-writer
- 04. "No Me Without U" – vocal producer, co-writer
- 12. "Why Do You Cry?" – co-producer, vocal producer, co-writer
- 14. "Like A Criminal" – vocal producer, co-writer

==== Day26 – Day26 ====
- 02. "Got Me Going"
- 06. "Co Star"
- 07. "Come In (My Door's Open)
- 13. "Just Should've Told You"

==== Ashlee Simpson – Bittersweet World ====
- 01. "Outta My Head (Ay Ya Ya)" – vocal producer, co-writer, background vocals
- 02. "Boys" – co-writer
- 03. "Rule Breaker" – vocal producer, co-writer, background vocals
- 04. "No Time For Tears" – background vocals
- 05. "Little Miss Obsessive" (featuring Tom Higgenson) – vocal producer, co-writer
- 06. "Ragdoll" – vocal producer, co-writer, background vocals
- 07. "Bittersweet World" – vocal producer, background vocals
- 08. "What I've Become" – vocal producer, co-writer, background vocals
- 09. "Hot Stuff" – co-writer
- 10. "Murder" (featuring Izza Kizza) – vocal producer, co-writer, background vocals
- "Can't Get Over It"
- "Follow U"

==== Ashanti – The Declaration ====
- 14. "Why" – co-writer
- "For My Man"
- "The World Song"

==== Taio Cruz – She's Like A Star Single ====
- "I Just Wanna Know (Jim Beanz Remix)"

==== Donnie Klang – Just a Rolling Stone ====
- 06. "Pick It Up"

==== Jennifer Hudson – Jennifer Hudson ====
- 03. "Pocketbook" (featuring Ludacris) – co-producer, co-writer, background vocals
- "Fallin Out Of Heaven"

==== Craig David – Greatest Hits ====
- 04. "Insomnia" – producer

==== Lemar – The Reason ====
- 03. "Little Miss Heartbreaker"

==== Britney Spears – Circus ====
- 01. "Womanizer" – vocal producer
- 04. "Kill The Lights" – co-writer, background vocals
- 08. "Blur" – vocal producer, background vocals

==== Jamie Foxx – Intuition ====
- 02. "I Don't Need It" – vocal producer, background vocals
- 17. "Street Walker"
- "Nothin For Ya"

==== Jada ====
- unknown track

=== 2009 ===
==== Chris Cornell – Scream (Mosley/Interscope/Universal) ====
- 01. "Part of Me" – vocal producer, background vocals
- 02. "Time" – co-writer, vocal producer, background vocals
- 03. "Sweet Revenge" – co-writer with James Fauntleroy, vocal producer, background vocals
- 04. "Get Up" – co-writer with James Fauntleroy, vocal producer, background vocals
- 05. "Ground Zero" – co-writer, vocal producer, background vocals
- 06. "Never Far Away" – co-writer with Ryan Tedder & The Clutch, vocal producer, background vocals
- 07. "Take Me Alive" – co-written with Justin Timberlake, vocal producer, background vocals
- 08. "Long Gone" – vocal producer
- 09. "Scream" – co-writer, vocal producer, background vocals
- 10. "Enemy" – co-writer with Ryan Tedder & The Clutch, vocal producer, background vocals
- 11. "Other Side Of Town" – co-writer, vocal producer
- 12. "Climbing Up The Walls" – co-writer, vocal producer
- 13. "Watch Out" – co-writer, vocal producer, background vocals
- "Lost Cause"

==== Keri Hilson – In A Perfect World... (Zone 4-Mosley Interscope/Universal) ====
- 04. "Return the Favor" (featuring Timbaland) – vocal producer
- 06. "Slow Dance" – co-writer with Justin Timberlake, vocal producer, background vocals
- 08. "Intuition" – writer, co-producer, vocal producer
- 09. "How Does It Feel" – co-writer, co-producer, vocal producer, background vocals
- 14. "Where Did He Go" – vocal producer
- 15. "Quicksand" – vocal producer
- 16. "Hurts Me" – vocal producer
- "The Ring"

==== Dzham ====
- "Every Day"

==== Ciara – Fantasy Ride (Jive/RCA Records/LaFace, Sony Music, Zomba) ====
- 04. "Turntables" (featuring Chris Brown) – vocal producer, background vocals
- 08. "Work" (featuring Missy Elliott) – vocal producer

==== Charlie Hustle ====
- "Go Hard" (featuring Rebel)

==== Dima Bilan – Believe ====
- 01. "Automatic Lady" – producer, vocal producer, writer
- 02. "Don't Leave" — producer, vocal producer, background vocals, writer
- 03. "Amnesia" — producer, co-writer with Ryan Tedder
- 04. "Number 1 Fan" — producer, vocal producer, writer
- 05. "Believe" — producer, vocal producer, background vocals, writer
- 06. "Lonely" – producer, vocal producer, writer
- 07. "Mistakes" – producer, vocal producer, background vocals, writer
- 09. "Anythin' 4 Love" (featuring D.O.E.) – producer, vocal producer, writer
- 11. "Circles" — producer, vocal producer, background vocals
- "Number 1 Fan" (featuring Sebastian) — producer, vocal producer, background vocals, writer

==== Esmée Denters – Outta Here (Tennman/Interscope/Universal) ====
- 04. "Love Dealer" – background vocals
- 05. "Gravity" – vocal producer, background vocals
- 10. "The First Thing" – vocal producer, background vocals
- 13. "Sad Symphony" – co-writer, vocal producer
- "Boyfriend"
- "Closer"

==== Luigi Masi – Save His Shoes ====
- 03. "Strobelight" – producer, vocal producer, writer
- 06. Better Now (featuring Sebastian) – producer, vocal producer, writer

==== Ginuwine – A Man's Thoughts ====
- "Disappearing Acts (featuring James Fauntleroy)
- "Hate To Love"

==== Lemar ====
- "U Got Me"

==== Whitney Houston – I Look To You ====
- "Undefeated" – producer, co-writer with Candice Nelson

==== Shakira – She Wolf ====
- 13. "Give It Up to Me" (featuring Lil Wayne)

==== Adam Lambert – For Your Entertainment ====
- 11. "Sleepwalker" – vocal production

==== Leseya Lee – The Phoenix ====
- 01. "Get Up And Jump"
- 02. "Junk N Tha Trunk"
- 03. "Blow" (featuring Cavan)

==== Timbaland – Shock Value II ====
- 02. "Carry Out" (featuring Justin Timberlake) – writer, additional vocals
- 06. "Tomorrow in the Bottle" (featuring Chad Kroeger & Sebastian) – writer
- 07. "We Belong to the Music" (featuring Miley Cyrus) – writer, vocal producer
- 08. "Morning After Dark" (featuring Nelly Furtado & SoShy)- writer, additional vocals, vocal producer
- 09. "If We Ever Meet Again" (featuring Katy Perry) – writer, co-producer with Timbaland, vocal producer
- 10. "Can You Feel It" (featuring Esthero & Sebastian) – writer
- 11. "Ease Off the Liquor" – writer
- 12. "Undertow" (featuring The Fray & Esthero) – writer
- 13. "Timothy Where You Been" (featuring Jet) – writer
- 14. "Long Way Down" (featuring Daughtry) – writer
- 15. "Marchin On (Timbo Version)" (featuring OneRepublic) – writer
- 17. "Symphony" (featuring Attitude, Bran' Nu & D.O.E.) – writer
- "I'm in Love With You" (featuring Tyson Ritter) – writer

==== JC Chasez – Kate ====
- "Fire" – co-producer

==== Samantha Jade ====
- "Eyez On Me" – co-producer with Timbaland
- "Make U Love Me" – co-producer with Timbaland and King Logan of The Royal Court
- "Curious" – co-writer with Samantha Jade & Corte Ellis

=== 2010 ===
==== Amar – Show It Off ====
- 01. "Masala" (featuring Jim Beanz & D.O.E.)
- 02. "Sajana (Pyar Ka Pehra) (featuring Shankar Mahadevan)
- 03. "See Me Girl" (featuring Apache Indian)
- 04. "Bombay Billionaire" (featuring Sonu Niigaam)
- 09. "Dil Ruba"
- 14. "Dekhne Tumko Tarse Naina"

==== Gunjan – Goonj: Echoes From Gunjan ====
- 01. "Tum Mile"

==== Lemar ====
- "Shout Out"

==== Rebel ====
- "Get in Fit In"
- "Have You Made Love Lately"
- "Is This What They Call Love"
- "Reloaded"
- "Roses"
- "Shoulda Coulda"
- "Snows in July"
- "Strung Out"
- "Who Are You"
- "Wifey"
- "Disappearing Acts"

==== JoJo – Can't Take That Away from Me ====
- 03. "Pretty Please"

==== Tina ====
- "So Good" (featuring Fat Joe)

==== Rihanna – Loud ====
- unknown tracks with Timbaland

==== Chase Landon ====
- "Flirt" – producer, vocal producer, co-writer with Candice Nelson

==== Keyshia Cole – Calling All Hearts ====
- 09. "Last Hangover" (featuring Timbaland) – vocal producer

=== 2011 ===
==== Raghav – The Phoenix ====
- "Fire" – producer, vocal producer, co-writer
- "Top of the World" – producer

==== Chris Brown – F.A.M.E. ====
- 16. "Paper, Scissors, Rock" (featuring Timbaland & Big Sean)

==== Dima Bilan – Dreamer ====
- "Rocket Man" – producer, vocal producer, writer
- "Get Outta My Way" – producer, vocal producer, writer

==== Luigi Masi – Pick Up Line ====
- "Pick Up Line" – producer, vocal producer, writer

==== Demi Lovato- Unbroken ====
- 01. "All Night Long" (featuring Missy Elliott & Timbaland) – writer, vocal producer
- 04. "Together" (featuring Jason Derulo) – writer, co-produced with Timbaland, vocal producer
- 05. "Lightweight" – writer, co-produced with Timbaland, vocal producer

==== Patricia Kazadi ====
- "Go Crazy (Jim Beanz Remix)"

==== Joe Jonas – Fastlife ====
- 09. "Not Right Now" – writer

==== Real Steel Soundtrack ====
- 09. Timbaland feat. Veronica "Give It A Go"

==== Day26 – A New Day ====
- "Made Love Lately"

=== 2012 ===
==== Cheryl Cole – A Million Lights ====
- "Screw You" (featuring Wretch 32) – vocal producer
- "Sexy Den a Mutha" – co-writer, producer
- "All Is Fair" – co-writer, producer
- "Boys Lie" – co-writer, producer, background vocals
- "I Like It" – co-writer, producer, additional vocals
- "Teddy Bear" – co-writer, producer

==== JoJo – Jumping Trains ====
- "Hell of a Song"
- "I Want Him On Top (Of My Life)"
- "Sexy to Me"

==== Lyrica Anderson – King Me Mixtape ====
- "Mixtape"
- "Mixtape" feat. Missy Elliott

=== 2013 ===
==== Darin – Exit ====
- "Playing With Fire"
- "Before I Pass Out (feat. Lil Jon)"
- "Same Old Song"
- "F Your Love"
- "What It's Like"

==== AGNEZ MO ====
- "Coke Bottle feat Timbaland and T.I"

=== 2015 ===
- Titan TV series Empire

==== Lil' Kim ====
- unknown tracks with Timbaland

==== Deborah Cox ====
- "Baby Love"
- "Call It Love"
- "Can't Wait"
- "Famous"
- "Love Will Conquer All"
- "No Good"
- "Picky Girl"
- "Unexpected Hero"

==== Lemar ====
- "Our Song"
- "Turn It Off"
- "War No More"

=== 2019 ===
==== Jane Zhang – Past Progressive ====
- 10. "Dust My Shoulders Off" (featuring Timbaland) – producer
- 11. “Adam and Eve” - producer
- 12. “Roll the Dice” - producer

=== 2024 ===
==== Nelly Furtado – 7 ====
- 1. "Showstopper" – vocal producer
- 2. "Corazón" (featuring Bomba Estéreo) – vocal producer, additional vocals
- 4. "Better for Worse" (featuring Gray Hawken) – producer, songwriter, engineer
- 10. "Ready for Myself" - vocal producer, additional vocals
- 11. "Fantasy" - additional vocals
- 12. "Better than Ever" - vocal producer, additional vocals
- 13. "Take Me Down" - vocal producer, engineer
