= Carry Out =

Single by Timbaland featuring Justin Timberlake

from the album Shock Value II
- Released: December 1, 2009
- Recorded: 2009
- Studio: No Excuses Studios (Santa Monica, California)
- Genre: Hip-hop
- Length: 3:52
- Label: Mosley; Blackground; Interscope
- Songwriters: Timothy Mosley; Justin Timberlake; Jerome Harmon; Michael Hartnett; Floyd Hills; James Washington
- Producers: Timbaland; J-Roc; Mike Hartnett

Timbaland singles chronology
"Say Something" (2009)	"Carry Out" (2009)	"Get Involved" (2010)

Justin Timberlake singles chronology
"Love Sex Magic" (2009)	"Carry Out" (2009)	"Love Dealer" (2010)

Music video
- "Carry Out" on YouTube

"Carry Out" is a song by American producer Timbaland from his third studio album Shock Value II (2009), featuring vocals from American singer Justin Timberlake. Mosley Music Group, together with Blackground and Interscope Records, serviced the song to contemporary hit radio in the United States on December 1, 2009, as the third single from the album. Timbaland and Timberlake co-wrote the song with J-Roc, Mike Hartnett, Danja, and Jim Beanz, with J-Roc and Hartnett co-producing the song with Timbaland.

"Carry Out" received a generally mixed response from music critics. Commercially, it peaked at number 11 on the Billboard Hot 100. Outside of the United States, "Carry Out" peaked within the top ten of the charts in Canada, the Republic of Ireland, and the United Kingdom. The song's accompanying music video, directed by Bryan Barber, features Timbaland and Timberlake surrounded by women, whom they attempt to seduce while dressed in fast-food restaurant-themed costumes.

== Writing and recording ==
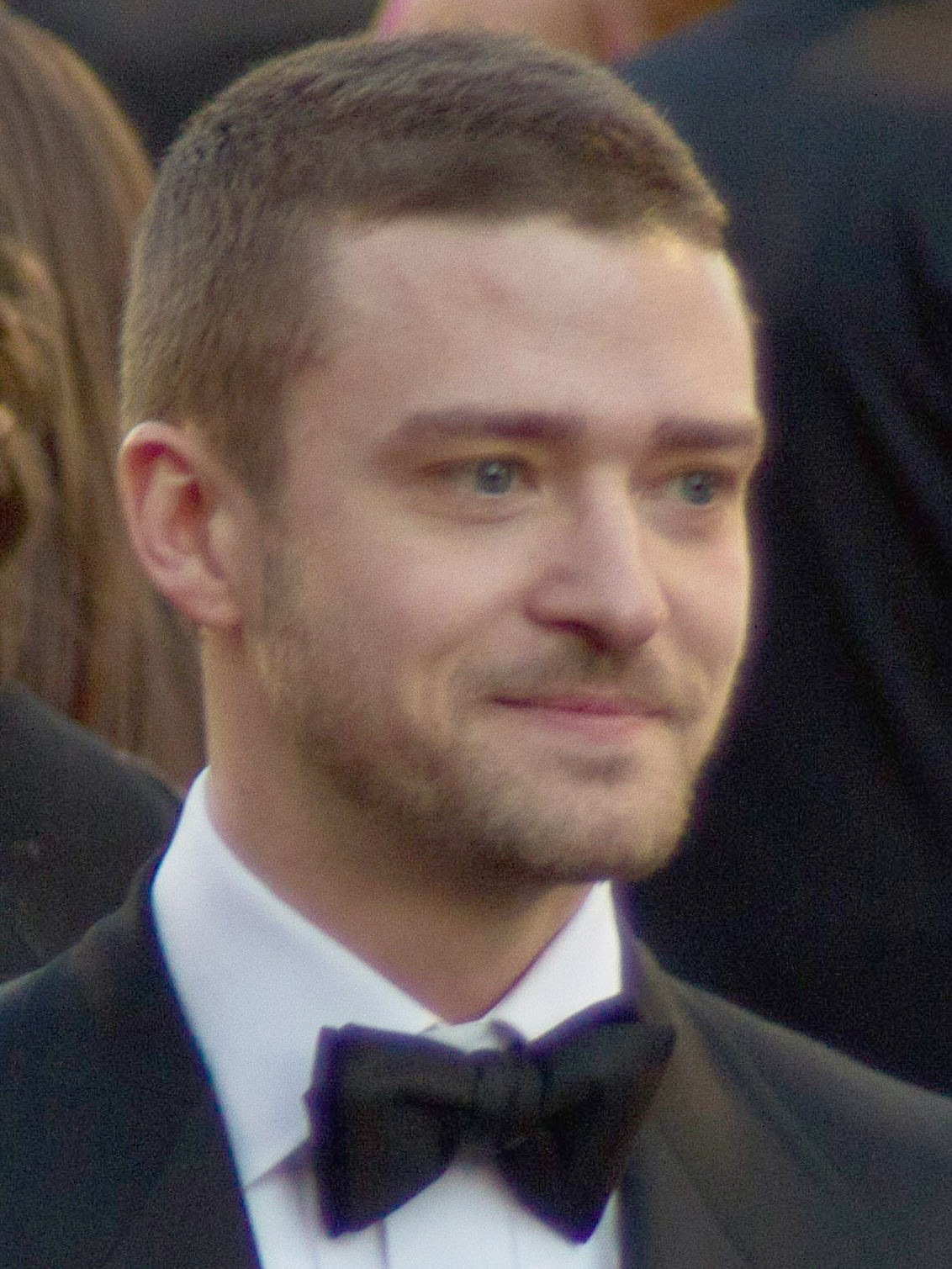
Justin Timberlake came up with the lyrics to "Carry Out" after listening to the track Timbaland had already produced.

"Carry Out" is one of twelve songs written and produced by Timbaland and J-Roc for Timbaland's third studio album Shock Value II (2009). Justin Timberlake, Mike Hartnett, Danja and Jim Beanz also assisted in the writing of the song. Timbaland, in an interview with MTV's Shaheem Reed and Gil Kaufman, stated that he favored this song over other recordings because the process for creating the song was similar to those of other collaborations they have done. Timberlake would come into the studio and listen to the track. Afterwards, he would then compose the lyrics in his head. Upon explaining their method of making music, Timbaland stated that: "We got a chemistry that cannot be described. People ask, 'Well, what are you and Justin like?' Can't tell you what it's like — it's a chemistry that can't be described. Something you would have to see for yourself and be, like, 'Them two got magic'." Timbaland stated that the song resembles a "2010 version" of Snoop Dogg's "Drop It Like It's Hot", produced by The Neptunes. He also revealed that the song was intended to provide a different slang for women: "Instead of 'Your phat butt' or 'Your big breasts,' we say, 'Oh, I need you. Can I be your carry out? Be my carry out. I want you to be my dinner, my leftovers, my everything.' It's a different slang. We're grown men, I wanna be subliminal to females. Like, 'Oooh, carry out? That's kinda sexy'."

Recording and mix engineer Demacio "Demo" Castellon, notable for recording and mixing nearly all of Timbaland's second studio album Shock Value (2007), worked with Chris Godbey on recording the track, while providing additional recording for The Demolition Crew and mixing the song; all of this took place at No Excuses Studios in Santa Monica, California. Chris Kasych and Brian Morton were signed as assistant mix engineers for the song, while Beanz, in addition to writing the song, contributed additional vocals and vocal production. Musician and songwriter Mike Hartnett performed on the guitars.

== Composition ==
"Carry Out" (2009)
A 20-second sample of the chorus of "Carry Out", which rides a syncopated beat coupled with a Middle Eastern-inspired groove.

"Carry Out" is a hip-hop song that is 3 minutes and 52 seconds long. It contains an electro-funk backing beat. The song moves through a Middle Eastern inspired groove and is built over a "pinging" syncopated beat. Timbaland performs the song in a spoken and sung style, while Timberlake performs his verses with a "seductive" lower register coupled with his falsetto vocals. The song contains many metaphors using food in place of sex. According to the digital music sheet published at Musicnotes.com by Alfred Publishing Co., Inc., the song was written in a key of E♭ minor. Riding a moderate hip hop groove, it is set in common time with a beat rate of 99 beats per minute. Timbaland and Timberlake's vocals range from the low note of B_{3} to the high note of D_{5}.

== Critical reception ==
"Carry Out" received a generally mixed response from music critics. Ben Norman of About.com praised it as a "fantastic fast food euphamism" [sic] and as an example of Timbaland's ability to craft "top-notch pop". Calling it a "radio smash", Luke Gibson of HipHop DX in his review of the single commented on the noticeable chemistry between Timbaland and Timberlake and deemed it will "have bodies moving". Gibson concluded, writing, "The song itself captures what's wrong or maybe right with the entire project." Jason Lipshutz of Billboard remarked that "Carry Out" competes with "Morning After Dark" to "burn up dancefloors". In his review of the album, David Balls of Digital Spy called "Carry Out" and "Meet in Tha Middle", "pretty irresistible". David E. Gray of Yahoo! Voices said that the song "shows how much Timberlake can add to a track when he's in his element." August Brown of Los Angeles Times commented that the album fares better with the collaborations with artists Timbaland has worked with previously, saying that Timberlake has a "goofy good time" on "Carry Out".

Will Hines of Consequence of Sound found the lyrical focus on the food metaphor for sex as "unerotic" and commented that Timberlake sounds "a little less invincible" on the track. Henry Yanney of Soul Culture labeled it a safe collaboration, noting it as a revival of Timbaland and Timberlake's "successful chemistry". Robert Copsey, in the review of the single itself, found the recording to be lacking in creativity, leaving him to comment that "'Carry Out' is one of Timbaland's least shocking efforts to date". Jon Parales of The New York Times said the song and "Morning After Dark" were less effective than the collaboration by Timberlake and Nelly Furtado on "Give It to Me" (Shock Value, 2007) and called the food-to-sex metaphor "unamusing".

Andy Kellman of AllMusic called "Carry Out" the dirtiest track on the album and noted that the two artists aimed for a contemporary form of The Lonely Island's "Dick in a Box" (Incredibad, 2009), on which Timberlake was featured. Brian Linder of IGN commented that the production on the song is tight, but panned the single for its food-sex metaphors, calling it "unforgivably stupid" and " such a joke that we half expected Andy Samberg to show up with his dick in a happy meal box," making reference to "Dick in a Box", which premiered on Saturday Night Live in 2006. Jesse Cataldo of Slant Magazine called the collaboration and "Say Something" "admirable turns" on the album, but commented that they are "forced to operate with unenviably tepid production." Cataldo concludes, writing, "The overall laziness of that facet is even more inexcusable coming from one of the most renowned producers of the last decade." Hugh Montgomery of The Observer noted it as one of the album's best tracks but called it "merely passable" and said it was " weighed down by [Timbaland's] own leaden rapping and with nothing new to add to the familiar, futurist R&B formula."

== Commercial performance ==
In the United States, the song debuted on the Billboard Hot 100 at number seventy-five on December 19, 2009. It rose to number eleven on the chart more than two months later on March 27, 2010. The song also appeared on the Pop Songs and Radio Songs charts, where it peaked at number eight and number ten respectively. The song spent twenty-six weeks on the Hot 100. As of 2018, the song has sold 2.3 million copies in the country. In Canada, the song debuted on the Canadian Hot 100 at number thirty-six, being the week's second highest debut behind Jason Derulo's "In My Head". It fell to number seventy-six in the following week. The song eventually reached a peak of number seven and charted for three more months.

The song experienced similar success in international territories. In New Zealand, the song debuted at number thirty-nine on the New Zealand Singles Chart on March 22, 2010. It reached a peak at number fifteen in its fifth week on the chart. In the United Kingdom, the song entered at number ninety-seven on the UK Singles Chart and rose sixty-eight places to twenty-nine in the following week. It peaked at number six two weeks later and stayed inside the top ten for almost a month. In the Republic of Ireland, "Carry Out" peaked at number three on the Irish Singles Chart. The song experienced a quick chart run in the Netherlands, where it debuted at number thirty-nine on the Dutch Top 40 and rose to its peak at number nineteen two weeks later. It ultimately lasted a total of seven weeks on the chart. "Carry Out" was not successful in Austria and Switzerland, where it peaked at number fifty-seven and number eighty on the Austrian Singles Chart and Swiss Singles Chart respectively, lasting only one to two weeks within the charts.

== Music video ==
Two music videos for "Carry Out" were shot. The first video, shot in December 2009, consisted of live performance footage of Timbaland and Timberlake. The video was due to be released in January 2010. In late January 2010, it was announced that a new video was going to be shot with director Bryan Barber. The video made its premiere on February 19, 2010. The video begins with sequences of several women dancing in underwear in front of light sing saying "Drive In" and "Hot Cakes". Scenes of Timbaland and Timberlake in front of the signs are also shown. Scenes are intercut showing Timbaland and his brother in a car watching girls skating around it. During the chorus, the performers are dancing in front of the signs with the girl dancers. Scenes are intercut and show separate scenes of Timbaland and Timberlake sitting on throne chairs while girls with plates full of food are around them. The video ends with several girls seductively eating cakes.

== Formats and track listings ==
Digital EP

1. "Carry Out" (New version) – 3:52
2. "Carry Out" (Chew Fu No MSG Fix Extended) – 4:25
3. "Carry Out" (Chew Fu No MSG Fix Radio) – 3:33
4. "Carry Out" (Chew Fu No MSG Fix Instrumental) – 3:54
5. "Carry Out" (Instrumental) – 3:55

CD single

1. "Carry Out (Album version) – 3:53
2. "Carry Out" (Chew Fu No MSG Fix Remix) – 3:34

== Credits and personnel ==
Credits are adapted from the liner notes of Shock Value II.

Recording and mixing

- Recorded and mixed at No Excuses Studios in Santa Monica, California.

Personnel

- Songwriting – Timbaland, Justin Timberlake, J-Roc, Mike Hartnett, Danja, Jim Beanz
- Production – Timbaland, J-Roc, Mike Hartnett
- Recording – Chris Godbey, Demacio "Demo" Castellon
- Additional recording – Demacio "Demo" Castellon, Bryan Morton, Chris Kasych
- Mixing – Demacio "Demo" Castellon
- Additional vocals – Jim Beanz
- Guitar – Mike Hartnett

== Charts ==
=== Weekly charts ===
Weekly chart performance for "Carry Out"
Chart (2009–2010)	Peak position
Australia (ARIA)	58
Austria (Ö3 Austria Top 75)	57
Belgium (Ultratip Flanders)	14
Belgium (Ultratip Wallonia)	24
Canada Hot 100 (Billboard)	7
Canada CHR/Top 40 (Billboard)	2
Canada Hot AC (Billboard)	17
Europe (Euro Digital Songs)	10
Germany (Media Control Charts)	42
Hungary (Editors' Choice Top 40)	40
Ireland (IRMA)	3
Netherlands (Dutch Top 40)	19
Netherlands (Single Top 100)	37
New Zealand (RIANZ)	15
Scottish Singles Sales (Official Charts)	6
Switzerland (Schweizer Hitparade)	80
UK Singles (Official Charts)	6
UK Airplay (Music Week)	9
UK Hip Hop/R&B (Official Charts)	4
US Billboard Hot 100	11
US Pop Airplay (Billboard)	8
US Rhythmic Airplay (Billboard)	7

=== Year-end charts ===
Year-end chart performance for "Carry Out"
Chart (2010)	Position
Canada (Canadian Hot 100)	40
UK Singles (Official Charts Company)	88
US Billboard Hot 100	38
US Mainstream Top 40 (Billboard)	28
US Rhythmic (Billboard)	23

== Certifications ==
Certifications and sales for "Carry Out"
Region	Certification	Certified units/sales
Canada (Music Canada)	Platinum	80,000^{‡}
New Zealand (RMNZ)	Platinum	30,000^{‡}
United Kingdom (BPI)	Platinum	600,000^{‡}
United States	—	2,300,000
^{‡} Sales+streaming figures based on certification alone.

== Release history ==
Release dates and formats for "Carry Out"
Region	Date	Format	Label
United States	December 1, 2009	Contemporary hit radio	Interscope, Blackground, Mosley
Argentina	April 22, 2010	Digital EP	Interscope, Blackground
Australia	April 22, 2010	Digital EP	Interscope, Blackground
Austria	April 22, 2010	Digital EP	Interscope, Blackground
Brazil	April 22, 2010	Digital EP	Interscope, Blackground
Finland	April 22, 2010	Digital EP	Interscope, Blackground
Republic of Ireland	April 22, 2010	Digital EP	Interscope, Blackground
New Zealand	April 22, 2010	Digital EP	Interscope, Blackground
Norway	April 22, 2010	Digital EP	Interscope, Blackground
Sweden	April 22, 2010	Digital EP	Interscope, Blackground
United Kingdom	April 22, 2010	Digital EP	Interscope, Blackground
United Kingdom	April 26, 2010	CD single	Polydor
Germany	May 28, 2010	CD single	Universal Music Group
