= Say Something (Timbaland song) =

Single by Timbaland featuring Drake

from the album Shock Value II
- Released: November 3, 2009
- Recorded: 2009
- Studio: No Excuses Studios (Santa Monica, California)
- Genre: Hip-hop; pop; electronic; R&B
- Length: 4:00
- Label: Mosley; Blackground; Interscope
- Songwriters: Timothy Mosley; Aubrey Graham; Jerome Harmon; John Maultsby; Nate Hills
- Producers: Timbaland; J-Roc

Timbaland singles chronology
"Morning After Dark" (2009)	"Say Something" (2009)	"Carry Out" (2009)

Drake singles chronology
"I Invented Sex" (2009)	"Say Something" (2009)	"BedRock" (2009)

Music video
- "Say Something" on YouTube

"Say Something" is a song recorded by American producer Timbaland, for his third studio album Shock Value II (2009). The song features vocals from Canadian rapper and singer Drake. It was written by both performers, along with John Maultsby and Timothy Clayton, and co-producer Jerome Harmon. The song was tailored to Drake's sound and when the rapper wrote to it, he contacted the producer about the lyrics. Despite the verses feeling more like Drake's record, Timbaland gave his blessing and went the product. The song was sent to U.S. digital retailers on November 3, 2009 as the album's second single.

"Say Something" is an electro-rap song with a slow-moving beat and feel. Lyrically, it portrays an interaction between Graham and a woman and the awkward feel to it, that is influenced by past events that occurred between them. "Say Something" garnered generally mixed reviews from music critics; many of them praised it as a "radio hit" but felt it fared worse than Drake's previous works and believed it highlighted Timbaland's weaknesses as a vocalist. Since its domestic release, the song has reached number twenty-three on the Billboard Hot 100, standing as the second highest-charting single from Shock Value II in the United States. The music video for the song was directed by Paul "Coy" Allen features appearances from Sebastian, D.O.E., Attitude and DJ Freestyle Steve.

== Background and composition ==
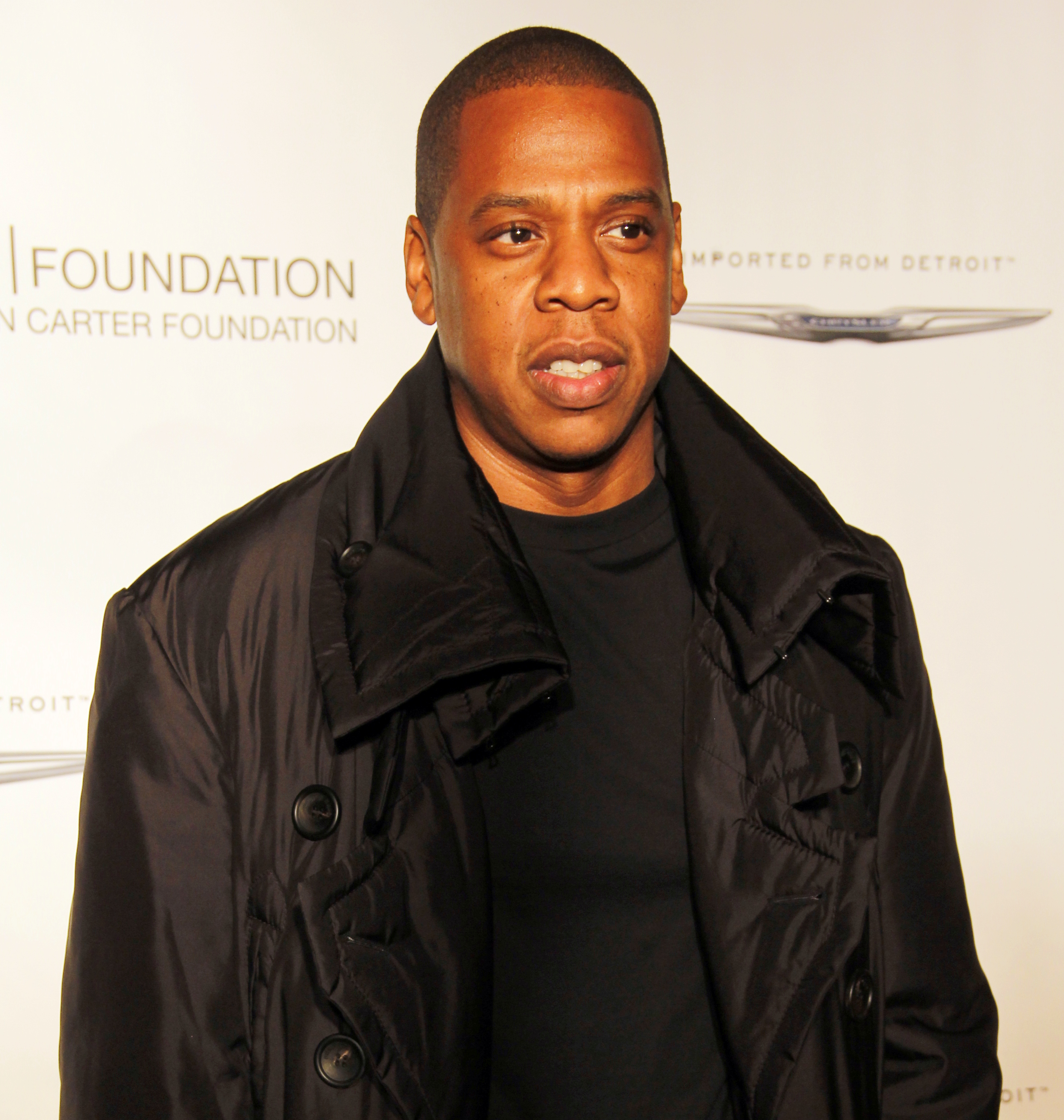
Timbaland cites Jay-Z as a reason to why the collaboration with Drake came to fruition.

"Say Something" was written by Timothy Mosley, Jerome Harmon, Aubrey Graham, Timothy Clayton and John Maultsby. The production of the song was helmed by Mosley under his stage-name Timbaland and by Harmon under his stage-name Jroc; the latter is credited as the co-producer. The pairing of Timbaland and Drake came about through a discussion between Mosley and Jay-Z. In an interview with Shaheem Reed of MTV News, Mosley quoted him saying "'Yo, man, you gonna wanna get in the studio with this guy named Drake. I'm telling you. He's the next cat.'" Mosley, Graham, and Harmon have collaborated on "Off That", featured on Jay-Z's eleventh studio album The Blueprint 3 (2009). Timbaland stated that he was impressed by Drake because of his tone, saying "His tone is ridiculous right now. I love his tone."

Mosley created the music behind the song and presented it to Drake for his approval. He told the Canadian rapper how it would be tailored to his type of music, but expressed his certainty with how it would sound. In a different interview with Reed for the same publication, Drake explained: "So he sent me the beat. I loved the beat. It had that spark to it. That emotion. It moved." Graham also explained that he came up with the song's concept of "how awkward it is seeing a girl that I used to talk to." He further stated: " It's almost like they see me, and they don't know what to say anymore. They may have treated me a way in the past, and it's like, 'Damn. I shouldn't have done that.' It's so many things running through my head. 'How do I approach this person now?'". He later expressed his satisfaction with record, stating: " It's an interesting concept. I'm glad that record is picking up. It was slow at first, but it's a feel-good record."

"Say Something (feat. Drake)"
A sample of "Say Something" which is set to a slow moving synthesized beat

After Graham wrote to the music, he replied to Mosley, asking for his approval of the lyrics: "'I wanna make sure you like this hook. Because the way I'm rapping to it, I feel like it was my record. I had to realize this was not my record; this is a feature you want me to be on." He told him afterwards that it was Graham's record, giving his blessing for the rapper taking over the song. Chris Godbey recorded and mixed the song at No Excuses Studios in Santa Monica, California with Matt Bang serving as the assistant engineer. "Say Something" is an electro-rap song that runs for 4 minutes and 1 second and is built upon a synthesized beat. Shaheem Reed of MTV described the beat as "buoyant" and the song to be "built for the party". Lyrically, it is about a famous man who makes plenty of money, but neglects to spend enough quality time with his girl.

== Release and reception ==
"Say Something" was serviced to digital retailers in the United States on November 3, 2009, and was solicited to urban radios in the United States more than two months later on January 12, 2010. It entered the Billboard Hot 100 on January 23, 2010, at number eighty seven. It later went on to peak at number twenty-three in the last week of March and lasted a total of twenty weeks on the chart. The song also reached the summit of the Rap Songs and R&B/Hip-Hop Songs component charts.

=== Critical reception ===
Steve Jones of USA Today named it one of the album's best tracks. Will Hines of Consequence of Sound expressed a different opinion about the song, but commented that it is "marginally more convincing [than "Carry Out"], but Drake fares better with his usual formula." Andy Hermann of Metromix New York labeled it "bland electro-rap" and called it "a waste of Drake’s considerable talents". Luke Gibson of HipHop DX called it "a song that will have the radio salivating." Henry Yanney of SoulCulture praised "Say Something" as one that people "will be undoubtedly drawn to". In his review of the album, he also noted that the song highlights Timbaland's weakness as an artist, writing that "Timbo’s verse feels lethargic and unnecessary". Brian Linder of IGN writes, "It amps things up a bit, but by the time it rolls around you'll be ready to skip ahead looking for a truly hot track." Ben Norman of About.com commented that the song was a strong example of how Timbaland's voice sounds "awkward and counterproductive" in the album's array of singers and musicians.

== Music video ==
The music video was released on December 8, 2009. It was directed by Paul "Coy" Allen who directed "Morning After Dark", and "If We Ever Meet Again". Model Keyshia Dior makes an appearance in the video. Sebastian, D.O.E., Attitude and DJ Freestyle Steve also make brief cameos in the video.

== Track listing ==
CD Single (Australia)

1. "Say Something" (Album Version) (Feat. Drake) – 4:01
2. "Say Something" (Remix) (Feat. Chris Brown) – 4:15

== Remixes ==
There are a number of remixes for the song:

1. "Say Something" (Original Version) (Feat. Drake)
2. "Say Something" (Remix) (feat. Drake, Chris Brown and Bow Wow)
3. "Say Something" (Female Version) Rasheeda (Feat. Nivea)

Digital download EP

1. "Say Something" (Album Version) (Feat. Drake) – 4:01
2. "Say Something" (Acapella) (Feat. Drake) – 3:47
3. "Say Something" (Instrumental) – 4:01
4. "Say Something" (Video) – 4:05

Lupe Fiasco, Fabolous & Young Jeezy also did freestyles of the song on their mixtapes.

American rapper Flo Rida did a freestyle that was dedicated to Haiti for his Green Tea Mixtape

== Credits and personnel ==
Credits taken from the liner notes of Shock Value, Mosley Music Group, Blackground Records, Interscope Records.

Recording and mixing

- Recorded and mixed at No Excuses Studios in Santa Monica, California

Personnel

- Songwriting – Timothy Mosley, Timothy Clayton, Jerome Harmon, Aubrey Graham, John Maultsby
- Production – Timbaland
- Recording – Chris Godbey
- Mixing – Chris Godbey, Matt Bang

== Charts ==
=== Weekly charts ===
Chart (2010)	Peak position
US Billboard Hot 100	23
US Hot R&B/Hip-Hop Songs (Billboard)	1
US Billboard Rap Songs	1
US Rhythmic Airplay (Billboard)	5

=== Year-end charts ===
Chart (2010)	Position
US Billboard Hot 100	85
US Hot R&B/Hip-Hop Songs (Billboard)	14
US Rhythmic (Billboard)	29
