= Morning After Dark =

2009 single by Timbaland

Single by Timbaland featuring Nelly Furtado and SoShy

from the album Shock Value II
- Released: October 26, 2009
- Recorded: 2009
- Studio: Chalice Studios (Los Angeles, CA); No Excuses Studios (Santa Monica, CA)
- Length: 3:51 (album version); 4:01 (without Nelly Furtado)
- Label: Blackground; Mosley
- Songwriters: Timothy Mosley; Nelly Furtado; Deborah Epstein; Keri Hilson; Jerome Harmon; James Washington; Michelle Bell
- Producers: Timbaland; J-Roc

Timbaland singles chronology
"Scream" (2008)	"Morning After Dark" (2009)	"Say Something" (2009)

Nelly Furtado singles chronology
"Más" (2009)	"Morning After Dark" (2009)	"Who Wants to Be Alone" (2010)

Music video
- "Morning After Dark" on YouTube

"Morning After Dark" is a song by American record producer Timbaland, taken from his third studio album, Shock Value II. The song features French singer SoShy and was released as the first single from the album on October 26, 2009. The international version of the song features an additional verse from Canadian singer Nelly Furtado and it is this version which features on the album.

== Background ==
The SoShy-only version of the song premiered on October 16, 2009, on Ryan Seacrest's KIIS-FM radio show, On Air with Ryan Seacrest. Timbaland said the song is "very interesting — it features this new artist on my label called SoShy from Paris. We're both rapping. The song — I can't describe it — it's so different. It's not different for me, but I can tell you this: it fits everything going on with the vampire theme. It fits everything with Twilight". When asked about why he picked the song as the first single he said:

The first single from Shock Value 2 is "Morning After Dark". The reason I picked 'Morning After Dark' for the first single is [it] has the most unique sound [on] the whole album. And when I kept looking at my new artist SoShy, her whole image fits [...] that song, where the song is kinda hard [...] but [also] s**y. She just fit in "Morning After Dark"; she actually came up with the concept of the track. I had the track, but she came up with the concept and I had blended in the concept of wanting to be cool to make the hook kinda talking about a vampire — that is a Timbaland signature record.

It was later reported that Nelly Furtado had recorded a new verse to feature on the song which would appear on the album and on the video version. The version featuring Furtado was released internationally whilst the version without was released in the US. Later on December 5, 2009, the international version was made available to US iTunes.

== Promotion ==
Timbaland performed part of the lead single "Morning After Dark" live at one of the album's launch parties at Mandalay Bay Beach on October 17 and again during the F1 in Abu Dhabi, UAE on October 30, 2009. Then he appeared with Nelly Furtado and SoShy for the first fully featured live performance of the song at the American Music Awards (2009) on November 22, 2009. On November 23, 2009, the trio appeared on The Tonight Show with Conan O'Brien for an encore performance. The song was featured in a promo for two episodes of the CW's Gossip Girl titled "They Shoot Humphreys, Don't They?" and "The Last Days of Disco Stick". Most of the live shows contain samples from Michael Jackson's song "Thriller", as well as using Vincent Price's laugh at the end of the performance.

== Critical reception ==
The song received generally positive reviews from music critics. Mariel Concepcion from Billboard magazine said "from the sounds of the first single, the producer is back in stride. Much like the material on his first set, the song heaves with massive sub-bass and weighty kick drums. [...] Timbaland flirtatiously harmonizes over a galactic-sounding, double-speed piano and thumping beats. [...] He croons on the catchy hook, which features his new label signee, SoShy. While comparisons to the 2007 cut "Return the Favor" are undeniable — lacking shock value on that end — this club banger will send shockwaves through your speakers nonetheless. However Nick Levine of Digital Spy was less impressed. He said "Sadly, this vamp-themed lead single, complete with oh-so-contemporary Twilight-inspired video, is somewhat lacking in bite. The production is suitably sinister, the beats are as sharp as tiny ice-picks, and there's capable support from Nelly Furtado and newcomer SoShy, but it's hard to shake the feeling that there's little here Timbo hasn't given us before. From a man who's built his reputation on boundary-pushing, that's a bit of a disappointment."

== Track listing and formats ==
US CD Single

1. "Morning After Dark" (featuring Nelly Furtado & SoShy) — 3:52
2. "Morning After Dark" (Chew Fu 2016 B-Boy Fix Remix) — 5:03

French CD Single

1. "Morning After Dark" (French radio Version) (featuring SoShy) — 4:03
2. "Morning After Dark" (English radio Version) (Featuring SoShy) (W/O Nelly Furtado) — 4:03
3. "Morning After Dark" (featuring Nelly Furtado & SoShy) English album version — 3:52
4. "Morning After Dark" (English Moto Blanco Club Mix) (Featuring Nelly Furtado & SoShy) — 07:16

UK Digital Download E.P.

1. "Morning After Dark" (Manhattan Clique Main) — 3:28
2. "Morning After Dark" (Chew Fu 2016 B-Boy Fix Remix) — 5:02
3. "Morning After Dark" (Moto Blanco Radio) — 3:47

US Digital Download E.P.

1. "Morning After Dark" (Chris Lake Remix) — 3:28
2. "Morning After Dark" (Kaskade Remix) — 3:47
3. "Morning After Dark" (Feed Me Remix) — 4:53
4. "Morning After Dark" (Chew Fu 2016 B-Boy Fix Remix) — 5:03

Wolfgang Gartner Remix

1. "Morning After Dark" (Wolfgang Gartner Remix) — 6:15

== Music video ==
The music video was directed by Paul "Coy" Allen and was filmed in November 2009. The video uses the version of the song that features only SoShy because Nelly's verse was recorded after Timbaland and SoShy filmed the music video. On November 16, 2009, Rap Up released a 50-second preview/teaser of what the video will entail. The video premiered exclusively on Timbaland's official website on November 22, 2009. The video is an estimated 7 minutes in length, longer than the song itself, featuring a story plot which begins with Sarah (played by Kati Sharp) who has been studying for a year in Italy, talking to her mother on the phone and then a friend who convinces her to go to a nightclub. While she's talking the camera gives a closeup of a birthmark or scar in the shape of two overlapping circles. On the way to the club, she is being tracked by a wall-walking vampire, as well as a black cat and Timbaland's character. As the vampire moves in on her, Timbaland's character zips in between them without her noticing. The cat changes into the form of a Japanese businessman (played by Hynican), another vampire, in the video, to board the bus after her where SoShy appears singing her verses, and as she gets off the bus, SoShy intercepts the cat/vampire/businessman keeping him from leaving the bus after her. Sarah meets yet another man at the club who appears to be a friend or lover, but as they are dancing, she notices a woman staring at her strangely while two other dancers mime a vampire attack on the dance floor. Rattled, she runs out and her companion follows to comfort her and asks her to tell him what she saw, to which she replies "I think I saw a vampire". This scene is very similar to the iconic scene in Twilight upon which the video is based.

Her friend's attitude immediately takes on a more threatening quality as a sudden lunar eclipse happens above them but before he can do anything he is confronted by Timbaland and SoShy's characters. He tells them that this time he's brought a couple of friends, and the vampire and the cat man appear to back him up only for the three of them to be frightened away by much larger crowd that Timbaland summons. The woman caught between the two sides looks down to see that her circular birthmark is glowing and looks like the eclipse, and the necklace worn by the vampire who was staring at her in the club. She quickly wakes up from the dream, only to see that the television is playing what it was at the start of the dream and the phone is ringing with her mother on the other end as the black cat comes in through the window.

On November 27, 2009, an edited extended version of the video was released for the version of the song that features Nelly Furtado. Nelly is featured in the video, appearing in a kitchen with a black cat while singing her verse, and Sarah is talking to her mother on the phone.

== Chart performance ==
The song debuted at 83 on the Hot 100 Airplay (Radio Songs) chart in the US on the week of November 9, 2009. It debuted at number 52 in Canada. It debuted at number 16 on the Swedish Singles Top 60 on the week of November 5. It also debuted at number 62 on the ARIA Charts in Australia on the week of November 9. On the week ending December 12, 2009, it also debuted at number 76 on the Billboard Hot 100 and peaked at number 61. On December 6, 2009, it entered at number nine on the UK Singles Chart and number five on the UK R&B Chart, it has since climbed to number six and number three respectively. In Germany the song enjoyed a successful chart run; after peaking at number six it remained in the top 30 singles for 12 weeks.

=== Weekly charts ===
Chart (2009–2010)	Peak position
Australia (ARIA)	19
Austria (Ö3 Austria Top 40)	12
Belgium (Ultratop 50 Flanders)	23
Belgium (Ultratip Bubbling Under Wallonia)	3
Bulgaria (BAMP)	1
Canada Hot 100 (Billboard)	8
Canada CHR/Top 40 (Billboard)	20
Canada Hot AC (Billboard)	20
Denmark (Tracklisten)	19
Europe (European Hot 100 Singles)	8
Finland (Suomen virallinen lista)	12
France (SNEP)	13
Germany (GfK)	6
Greece (IFPI)	1
Hungary (Rádiós Top 40)	10
Hungary (Single Top 40)	8
Ireland (IRMA)	11
Mexico (Billboard Ingles Airplay)	46
Netherlands (Dutch Top 40)	21
Netherlands (Single Top 100)	17
Norway (VG-lista)	13
Poland Dance (ZPAV)	26
Romania TV Airplay (Media Forest)	1
Russia (Top Radio Hits)	82
Scottish Singles Sales (Official Charts)	8
Slovakia Airplay (ČNS IFPI)	13
Sweden (Sverigetopplistan)	6
Switzerland (Schweizer Hitparade)	20
UK Singles (Official Charts)	6
UK Hip Hop/R&B (Official Charts)	3
US Billboard Hot 100	61
US Dance Club Songs (Billboard)	5

=== Year-end charts ===
Chart (2009)	Position
UK Singles Chart	157

Chart (2010)	Position
Austrian Singles Chart	72
Canada (Canadian Hot 100)	49
European Hot 100 Singles	42
German Singles Chart	66
Hungarian Airplay Chart	32
Romanian Top 100	5
UK Singles Chart	166

== Certifications ==
Region	Certification	Certified units/sales
Australia (ARIA)	Gold	35,000^{^}
Germany (BVMI)	Gold	150,000^{‡}
United Kingdom (BPI)	Silver	200,000^{^}
^{^} Shipments figures based on certification alone.^{‡} Sales+streaming figures based on certification alone.

== Release history ==
Country	Format	Date	Label
United States	Digital download	October 26, 2009	Blackground / Mosley
Canada	Digital download	October 26, 2009	Interscope Records
United States	Top 40 Mainstream and Rhythmic radio	October 26, 2009	Interscope Records
United Kingdom	Digital Download	November 23, 2009	Interscope Records
United Kingdom	CD single	November 30, 2009	Interscope Records
