= Slow Dance (song) =

- Promotional cover

Single by Keri Hilson

from the album In a Perfect World...
- Released: July 21, 2009
- Studio: Thomas Crowne, Chalice Recording (Los Angeles, California)
- Length: 4:22
- Label: Mosley; Zone 4
- Songwriters: Keri Hilson; Justin Timberlake; James Washington; Solomon "King" Logan; Johnkenum Spivery
- Producer: The Royal Court

Keri Hilson singles chronology
"Make Love" (2009)	"Slow Dance" (2009)	"Number One" (2009)

Music video
- "Keri Hilson - Slow Dance (Official Music Video)" on YouTube

"Slow Dance" is a song by American recording artist Keri Hilson. Written with American singer Justin Timberlake, the song was penned while she was a guest on the British leg of Timberlake's FutureSex/LoveShow tour. The writing team also included The Royal Court who along with Skyz Muzik produced the track. The song serves as the sixth single from her debut studio album, In a Perfect World.... Giving off a psychedelic vibe and compared to 1980's Prince ballads and Ciara slow burners, the song received generally positive reviews, complimenting its musical backdrop and vulnerable lyrical appeal.

Hilson originally premiered the song at her producer/mentor Polow da Don's launch party for his record label, Zone 4, in Atlanta in July 2007, and later performed it several times as promoting it as In A Perfect World's sixth single. The song was not adequately receptive in the United States, reaching forty-nine on the Hot R&B/Hip-Hop Songs chart. Two music videos for the song were shot, the Chris Robinson-directed second version being used as the official video. The video features Hilson at getting ready and enjoying herself at a party, featuring appearances by Monica, Chris Brown, former Pussycat Dolls member Melody Thornton and Omarion, among others. She performed the song as a part of a medley at the 2009 Soul Train Music Awards.

== Background ==
"Slow Dance" was written with Hilson alongside American recording artist Justin Timberlake, as well as Johnkenum D. Spivery and Timbaland protégés The Royal Court and Jim Beanz. According to Hilson, the songs were first in the works with fellow Timbaland collaborator Justin Timberlake in 2006, during FutureSex/LoveSounds era, but she commented, "it was still unofficial then. The budgets hadn't been opened up for me at that stage." Hilson premiered the song at her producer and mentor Jamal "Polow da Don" Jones's launch party his newly created, Interscope-distributed record label, Zone 4, in Atlanta in July 2007. On choosing singles for In A Perfect World..., in an interview with Digital Spy, Hilson stated, "[Timbaland] liked it a lot at first and said it should be a single, but just as that was about to happen he called it 'bubble bath music'. But now he loves it again and thinks it should be a single! He'll really change it up on you." The song went for adds on urban airplay formats on July 21, 2009.

== Composition and critical reception ==
"Slow Dance"
A sample of "Slow Dance" featuring a backdrop of guitar and synthesizers, compared to 1980's Prince ballads.

The down-tempo R&B piece features a guitar-laden background with synthesizers, and features lyrics about the physical attraction of a relationship. "Slow Dance" has been said to sound like a Ciara's "Promise" and 1980's Prince ballad, and described as "sparkly" and "psychedelic." A writer for Spike called the song a "digital lullaby." Calling the lyrical content "the ecstasy of desire with all the warmth of an alien observing life on Planet Earth", Mikael Wood of The Los Angeles Times said the song was impeccably arranged. Quentin B. Huff of PopMatters stated, that on In A Perfect World..., songs like "Slow Dance", "tend to provide better matches between the vocals and the music, since the backdrop keeps things simple and the lyrics don’t always fall into slang and unintentional irony." Jon Caramanica of The New York Times called the song "excellent", commenting that the song was the album's high point. Sophie Bruce of BBC Music said the song "is laden with potential in its first Prince-channelling two minutes, but loses its way completely when it breaks down into beatboxing." Calling the album's slow numbers a problem, and the song itself "smooth", Sal Cinquemani of Slant Magazine said "Slow Dance" was "nothing more than a copy of Ciara's "Promise."

== Music video ==
The original music video was directed by Paul Hunter, known for his work on previous Michael Jackson and TLC clips. However, for unknown reasons, the video was scrapped, and Hilson re-shot a clip for the video with "Knock You Down" and "Number One" director Chris Robinson. Robinson told Rap-Up, "Keri Hilson has a great personality and is a real girl. That’s what we want to get across." He also talked about the premise and plot of the video, stating that the video portrays Hilson as a woman who doesn't take herself seriously, commenting,

Hilson alongside Monica in a Jeep riding to a party, and her featured in front of a leather wall.

"It’s a really sexy song, but we don’t want to fall into the typical love, love, love R&B vibe with that... it starts where you think, ‘Oh, it’s about her and being sexy.' She’s in her house and by herself, and you kind of think it could be serious, but the song drops out in the middle and her friends catch her being all sexy, basically like, ‘What the f**k [sic] are you doing? You are not singing by yourself.’"

In an interview with That Grape Juice, when asked about the video and on the sensuality of the live performances compared to video, Hilson responded,

"Yeah. It is a bit of that, but it’s a bit toned down for the video, because you got so much censoring, I can’t do everything I do on stage (laughs). So when people come out they’re probably still gonna be a bit surprised to see it live, after seeing the video. But I’m very pleased with the video. I love the colours and it’s reminiscent of the whole late 70s early 80s era in music."

Chris Brown, Omarion, Monica, Melody Thornton, and Polow Da Don all appear in the video. The video begins with Hilson, dressed lavishly, arriving late to a Jeep full of the previous stated people. The clip flips back to what happened earlier that night, showing Hilson getting ready in a seductive fashion, as she chooses perfume and picks out clothes. Scenes of Hilson performing in front of a leather-like wall are interspersed in between her and her friends riding down a boulevard to the club. Once she arrives to the club, she is attracted to a particular man, and subsequently performs elaborate, sensual choreography with him and other dancers, before slow dancing. VIBE said, "Keri Hilson is fine as wine. You know it. We know it. And she knows it. But for the doubters, she proves it once again with this seductive new video from In A Perfect World." A writer for Rap-Up said that Hilson, "takes it nice and slow in the video for 'Slow Dance.'" The video ranked at number 80 on BET: Notarized Top 100 Videos of 2009 countdown.

== Live performances ==
Aside from performing it at the 2007 Zone 4 launch, Hilson performed the song on Late Night with Jimmy Fallon on September 17, 2009, alongside The Roots. She also performed it as a part of a medley at the 2009 Soul Train Music Awards.

== Personnel ==
Credits lifted from the liner notes of In a Perfect World....

- Marcella Araica – engineer
- Keri Hilson – vocal arranger/producer, writer
- Solomon "King" Logan – writer
- The Royal Court – producers
- Johnkenum D. Spivery – writer
- Justin Timberlake – writer
- James "Jim Beanz" Washington – vocal arranger/producer, writer

== Charts ==
Weekly chart performance for "Slow Dance"
Chart (2009)	Peak position
US Hot R&B/Hip-Hop Songs (Billboard)	49
