= In a Perfect World... =

Studio album by Keri Hilson
- Released: March 24, 2009
- Recorded: 2006–2009
- Genre: R&B
- Length: 60:24
- Labels: Mosley; Z IV; Interscope
- Producers: Timbaland; Polow da Don; Danja; The Royal Court; The Runaways; Cory Bold; Jason Perry; Roy "Royalty" Hamilton; Anthony M. Jones; The Clutch

Keri Hilson chronology
In a Perfect World... (2009)	No Boys Allowed (2010)

Singles from In a Perfect World...
- 1. "Energy" Released: May 27, 2008; 2. "Return the Favor" Released: October 7, 2008; 3. "Turnin Me On" Released: December 9, 2008; 4. "Knock You Down" Released: April 7, 2009; 5. "Make Love" Released: June 23, 2009; 6. "Slow Dance" Released: July 21, 2009

In a Perfect World... is the debut studio album by American singer-songwriter Keri Hilson. It was released on March 24, 2009, through Interscope Records, Zone 4 and Mosley Music Group. Originally planned for a 2007 release, it was pushed back numerous times into 2008, amid her label's budget issues and minor single releases. The production on the album was handled primarily by Timbaland, Polow da Don and Danja, among others. The album features guest appearances from Timbaland himself, alongside Lil Wayne, Keyshia Cole, Trina, Kanye West, Ne-Yo, Akon, D.O.E., and Nicole Scherzinger.

Upon its release, In a Perfect World… received generally mixed to positive reviews from music critics. Commercially, the album debuted at number four on the US Billboard 200 chart, selling 94,000 copies in its first week. It also topped the Top R&B/Hip-Hop Albums chart and peaked within the top 10 of the UK R&B Albums chart. On October 22, 2009, the album was certified gold by the Recording Industry Association of America (RIAA), following shipments in excess of 500,000 copies in the United States. The album scored Hilson two nominations for Best New Artist and Best Rap/Sung Collaboration for the 52nd Grammy Awards.

In a Perfect World... was released on vinyl, for the first time, on November 7, 2025.

== Background ==
"It’s my way of saying nothing in the world is perfect and no person in it is, either. None of us are exempt from certain hardships and heartbreaks. It was really important for me to write songs that women can relate to from real situations. I didn’t want to do an album that painted myself as perfect because no matter how things look, no one is. I called it that with the ellipses – dot dot dot – because it's an incomplete statement. I wanted to talk about how nobody's exempted from the realities of life and all those things."

— In an interview following the confirmation of the album Hilson was asked to explain the title.

Hilson spent most of her teenage years working with producer Anthony Dent, as a songwriter and background vocalist for the likes of Usher, Ludacris, Kelly Rowland, Toni Braxton, Ciara and Polow da Don. After graduating from high school, Hilson attended Oxford College of Emory University and Emory University in Atlanta for three years and studied a course in theater. She continued working as a songwriter and background vocalist during her schooling years. Hilson eventually stopped working with Dent, and began working more with Polow da Don. She also became a member of the songwriting and production team, The Clutch. Together, they wrote Mary J. Blige's "Take Me as I Am" (2006), Omarion's "Ice Box" (2006), Ciara's "Like a Boy" (2006), The Pussycat Dolls' "Wait a Minute" (2007) and Britney Spears' "Gimme More" (2007). In 2006, Polow introduced Hilson to American rapper and producer Timbaland, who then signed her to his record label, Mosley Music Group. In November 2006, Hilson was featured on American rapper Lloyd Banks' single, "Help", for his album Rotten Apple (2006).

The following year, Hilson was featured on three singles; in June, on Timbaland's song "The Way I Are", the second single from his album Shock Value (2007); on Rich Boy's "Good Things" with Polow da Don; and thereafter, in December, on Timbaland's song "Scream" with Nicole Scherzinger, the fifth single from Shock Value. Out of the three singles, "The Way I Are" achieved the most success, topping nine charts around the world.

== Recording ==
=== Writing and recording sessions ===
Much of the album was recorded under the watchful eyes of the projects executives Timbaland and/or Polow da Don although much of the writing had begun before this. Hilson has extensive writing credits on the album having contributed to all of songs except for "Make Love", "Change Me", "Energy" and bonus track "Hurts Me". On some of the tracks she has worked with her writing collective The Clutch who were responsible for her previous guest appearances on hit singles with mentor Timbaland ("The Way I Are" and "Scream"). Other songs were submitted by production trio 'The Runaways' (unknown at the time) who wrote and produced the lead single "Energy" whilst Hannon Lane, Timbaland, Esther Dean and Polow da Don also providing further tracks for recording. Lil Wayne, Keyshia Cole, Trina, Timbaland, Kanye West, Ne-Yo, Akon and Nicole Scherzinger are all featured vocalists on the album's track listing (though it does vary by territory). Notable credits can also be attached to Justin Timberlake who co-wrote the 90's themed "Slow Dance" and Jim Beanz who worked on R&B anthem "How Does it Feel" and R&B ballad "Hurts Me" which is featured as a bonus track.

Hilson and Ne-Yo knew each other from their days as co-songwriters. Hilson had appeared as Ne-Yo's love interest in the video for his song "Miss Independent," the second single taken from his 2008 album, Year of the Gentleman. In a September 2008 interview with Rap-Up about a recent crop of songwriters becoming singers, Ne-Yo said "For one, I think Keri Hilson’s too freakin’ pretty to be in the background. For two, her voice is incredible—on top of the fact that she can write. So I think that she's definitely one that deserves the spotlight." Speaking about the album in the weeks running up to the album's release Hilson pointed out that it had always been a dream of hers to work with Ne-Yo and Kanye West but it was a complete coincidence that their vocals appeared on the same song. Kanye was given the opportunity to add his vocals at the last possible moment before the album was mastered and chose the song "Knock You Down" which went on to become Hilson's biggest hit as a solo artist. Of the collaboration between Ne-Yo and West, Hilson told Pete Lewis of "Blues & Soul" "While Ne-Yo is so used to playing up the gentleman side to him, at the same time Kanye is used to playing the villain who makes mistakes and talks about it! So to have both of them feature on that one song I felt was just ideal".

=== Post-production ===
A small number of tracks were leaked before the album's release and have therefore been cited as contributing to the delays in the album's release. "Mic Check" (featuring Akon) and "Love Ya" were two songs produced by Timbaland and Danja respectively that were not included in the final track listing despite being mentioned early on by Hilson on her website and during interviews. At one stage the album was due to feature a collaboration with Snoop Dogg called "Henny and Apple Juice" that would have been released as the lead single – it was confirmed during early interviews and during a blog with Concrete Loop in 2007. "Ready to Fall" was another collaboration with singer-songwriter Ne-Yo described as having 'classic heavy synth-vibes' was released instead as part of "The Future of RnB" mixtape series by Tapemasters inc. "Get It Girl" with Timbaland was released as a promotional single in partnership with Verizon Wireless exclusively for the US but not included in the album. Other songs written and produced by Justin Timberlake also didn't make the album. Although in July 2009 in London, UK Hilson gave an interview in which she stated that a re-release of the album was in the pipeline for the end of the year and could feature some of the leftover songs such "Love Ya" as well as some new recordings with Timbaland and Polow da Don.

Critically acclaimed is the song "Alienated", a song that was never intended for Hilson's own album. In an interview with Digital Spy it was revealed that the song was written for Nicole Scherzinger's solo album but when her commitments to the Pussycat Dolls forced the album to be shelved Hilson was able to reclaim the song. Reviews have described Hilson's version as having an "out of this world production from Cory Bold that could be a future single" with "electro-blips and whispery raps that are alluring."

== Singles ==
"Return the Favor" was performed at Verizon/People Pre-Grammy party dedicated to Timbaland, in preparation for its release as the first single. However this was succeeded by "Energy" and "Return the Favor" was released as the second single instead. "Energy" was released as the first single (except Europe) and was available as a digital download on May 27, 2008. The video premiered on July 14, 2008. It charted at number 78 on the Billboard Hot 100, number 21 and 72 on Hot R&B/Hip-Hop Songs and Pop 100 respectively. The single performed best in New Zealand where it charted at number 2 but failed to significantly chart elsewhere. Hilson announced in July 2009 that the single would be re-promoted as the next international single following the success of "Knock You Down". It was released in the UK as a download on September 13, 2009 and a CD single on September 14. It peaked at number 45 in the UK. Blender magazine ranked it number 61 on its list of "The Top 144 Songs of 2008". "Return the Favor" was released as the second worldwide single on October 7, 2008, and the video, premiered on October 23, 2008. It failed to chart in the US. It was subsequently released in the UK and Europe as the lead single. The video was released to UK music channels on March 16, 2009, the song charted at number 83 after 2 days before peaking at 19.

"Turnin Me On" featuring Lil Wayne was released as the third single (not released in Europe) on November 25, 2008. The single became Hilson's most successful solo offering at the time as it peaked at number 15 on the Billboard Hot 100, number two and 28 on the US Hot R&B/Hip-Hop Songs and Pop 100 respectively. It was also the first single to chart in Canada although it did only reach number 80. Vibe magazine named it the sixty-seventh best song of 2008.

The next single "Knock You Down", featuring Kanye West and Ne-Yo became Hilson's highest charting worldwide release as a lead singer and also her longest charting single. The video was premiered on March 23, 2009, on Ne-Yo's official YouTube channel. The single is Hilson's best solo release to date reaching number three on the Billboard Hot 100 and number one on the US R&B/Hip-Hop chart. It has already been released as the second single in Europe and so reached number five on the UK Top 40 and number 2 on the UK R&B Chart. The song "Change Me", featuring Akon, was sent to US rhythmic radio on October 12, 2009 Make Love was sent to radio on June 21, 2009.

"Slow Dance" is the fifth single (not released in Australia) from the album. Two videos were shot, one in July 2009 with director Paul Hunter, and one in August 2009 with director Chris Robinson. The original music video has since been released. Since July 13, 2009, the single has been serviced to both Rhythmic and Urban radio stations in the US, but has yet to make any impact on the charts.

"I Like" is a song recorded in 2009 and added to the German re-release of the album, In a Perfect World.. I Like Edition. It was released as the third single in Europe (sixth overall), and appears on the soundtrack to the German film Zweiohrküken. It was released in the UK on March 29, 2010. It was released as the fifth single in Australia on November 25, 2009.

== Critical reception ==
Professional ratings
Aggregate scores
Source	Rating
Metacritic	65/100
Review scores
Source	Rating
AllMusic	4/5 stars
Blender	3.5/5 stars
Entertainment Weekly	B+
Los Angeles Times	2/4 stars
PopMatters	5/10
Q	3/5 stars
Rolling Stone	3.5/5 stars
Slant Magazine	2.5/5 stars
Spin	6/10
USA Today	3/4 stars

In a Perfect World… received generally positive reviews from music critics. At Metacritic, which assigns a normalized rating out of 100 to reviews from mainstream critics, the album received an average score of 65, based on 13 reviews. AllMusic's Andy Kellman commented that the album "reflects the versatility Hilson demonstrated prior to its release. It's a songwriting showcase as much as it is a coming out for a full-blown artist, yet more about what Hilson can do than who Hilson is". Entertainment Weekly's Margeaux Watson called it "a seductive debut CD full of slick, radio-friendly cuts". Jody Rosen of Rolling Stone found its songs "uniformly excellent. Hilson's halfway there — she just needs a lil' more personality". Quentin B. Huff of PopMatters shared a similar sentiment, perceiving Hilson's songwriting as impersonal, and wrote "As a whole, the album suffers from an overriding sense of sameness, of mood as well as in relation to the current R&B landscape. [...] it’s a bit melodramatic in places and maybe a touch too hip for its own good". Rob Sheffield of Blender wrote that Hilson "comes across as fresh on her long-delayed debut."

In a mixed review, Slant Magazine's Sal Cinquemani called it "merely passable", and Q observed "too much flab" at "70 minutes" and criticized that "the ballads drag horribly." Jon Caramanica of The New York Times found Hilson "often inventive, approaching the beat from odd angles and picking unexpected moments for rhyme", but felt that too much of the production is cluttered and "ornate", writing that it "favors texture and rhythm over melody or feeling." Barry Walters of Spin wrote that Hilson's "fresh attitude eventually gets lost in a slew of downtrodden ballads that sink the album's second half." Vibe found it only "satisfactory" and "simply okay, not quite the sum of its parts. She has the right juice. Now it’s just a matter of how to keep it flowing." Writing for MSN Music, Robert Christgau named "Intro", "Return the Favor", and "Turnin Me On" as highlights on an otherwise unimpressive album.

In a Perfect World... earned Hilson two 2010 Grammy Award nominations, in the category of Best New Artist and Best Rap/Sung Collaboration (for "Knock You Down").

== Commercial performance ==
In a Perfect World… debuted at number 4 on the US Billboard 200 and at number one on the Top R&B/Hip-Hop Albums chart, selling 94,000 copies in its first week. The album has been certified gold for shipping and selling 500,000 copies in the United States.

== Track listing ==
In a Perfect World...
No.	Title	Writer(s)	Producer(s)	Length
1.	"Intro"			1:30
2.	"Turnin Me On" (featuring Lil Wayne)	Jamal Jones; Keri Hilson; Zak Wallace; Dwayne Carter, Jr.	Polow da Don; Danja^{[a]}; Hilson^{[b]}	4:08
3.	"Get Your Money Up" (featuring Keyshia Cole and Trina)	Jones; Hilson; Earl Hayes	Polow da Don; Danja; Hilson^{[b]}	3:16
4.	"Return the Favor" (featuring Timbaland)	Timothy Mosley; Hilson; Ezekiel Lewis; Balewa Muhammad; Patrick "J. Que" Smith; Candice Nelson; Walter Millsap III	Timbaland; Millsap^{[a]}	5:29
5.	"Knock You Down" (featuring Kanye West and Ne-Yo)	Floyd Nathaniel Hills; Hilson; Kevin Cossom; Shaffer Smith; Marcella Araica; Kanye West	Danja; Hilson^{[b]}	5:26
6.	"Slow Dance"	Hilson; Justin Timberlake; James Washington; King Logan; Johnkenum Spivery	Logan; Spivery^{[c]}; Hilson^{[b]}; Beanz^{[b]}	4:22
7.	"Make Love"	Jones; Ester Dean; Jason Perry	Polow da Don; Perry^{[c]}; Hilson^{[b]}	5:22
8.	"Intuition"	Mosley; Hilson	Timbaland; Danja^{[a]}; Hilson^{[b]}	4:11
9.	"How Does It Feel"	Mosley; Hilson; Washington	Timbaland; Danja; Hilson^{[b]}; Beanz^{[b]}	3:58
10.	"Alienated"	Hilson; Timothy "Attitude" Clayton; Cory Bold	Cory Bold; Danja^{[a]}; Hilson^{[b]}	4:34
11.	"Tell Him the Truth"	Hills; Hilson; Araica	Danja; Hilson^{[b]}	4:48
12.	"Change Me" (featuring Akon)	Jones; Dean; Matt Goss; Perry	Polow da Don	4:54
13.	"Energy"	Louis Biancaniello; Rico Love; Sam Watters; Wayne Wilkins	The Runaways	3:30
14.	"Where Did He Go"	Mosley; Hills; Hilson	Timbaland; Danja; Hilson^{[b]}	4:57

Notes

- Track listing and credits from album booklet.
- ^{^a} signifies additional record producer
- ^{^b} signifies a vocal record producer
- ^{^c} signifies a co-record producer

== Personnel ==
- Marcella "Ms. Lago" Araica – engineer, editing, audio mixing
- Jo Baker – makeup
- Matt Bang – assistant engineer
- Jim Beanz – arranger, vocals, vocal arrangement, vocal producer
- Giuliano Bekor – photography
- Cory Bold – programming, record producer, instrumentation
- Errol Brown – stylist
- Ravaughn Brown – vocals
- Dru Castro – engineer
- Timothy "Attitude" Clayton – vocals
- Keyshia Cole – guest appearance
- Trina – guest appearance
- Jimmy Douglas – mixing
- Thomas Drayton – guitar
- Cliff Feiman – production supervisor
- Eric Live Florence – keyboards
- Rick Frazier – A&R
- Sharon Gault – makeup
- Yvette Gayle – publicity
- Karen Goodman – marketing
- Mark Gray – mixing assistant
- Carl Ryan – finance
- Kanye West – guest appearance
- Bernie Grundman – mastering
- Keri Hilson – arranger, vocal arrangement, vocal producer
- Jean-Marie Horvat – mixing
- Stephanie Hsu – creation
- Monique Idlett – marketing
- Tiffany Johnson – marketing
- Bryan Lee Jones – engineer
- Lil Wayne – guest appearance
- Tony Maserati – mixing
- Scott Naughton – engineer
- Ne-Yo – guest appearance
- John D. Norten – engineer
- Alex Ortiz – engineer
- Benjamin Reid – engineer
- Marcus Heisser – A&R
- Manny Smith – A&R
- Eric Spence – A&R
- Marcus Spence – marketing
- Timbaland – producer, executive producer, guest appearance
- Ianthe Zevos – creation

== Charts ==
=== Weekly charts ===
Weekly chart performance for In a Perfect World...
Chart (2009)	Peak position
Australian Urban Albums (ARIA)	23
Canadian Albums (Billboard)	13
German Albums (Offizielle Top 100)	28
Irish Albums (IRMA)	35
Japanese Albums (Oricon)	23
New Zealand Albums (RIANZ)	16
Swiss Albums (Schweizer Hitparade)	67
UK Albums (OCC)	22
UK R&B Albums (Official Charts)	4
US Billboard 200	4
US Top R&B/Hip-Hop Albums (Billboard)	1

=== Year-end charts ===
2009 year-end chart performance for In a Perfect World...
Chart (2009)	Position
US Billboard 200	68
US Top R&B/Hip-Hop Albums (Billboard)	15

2010 year-end chart performance for In a Perfect World...
Chart (2010)	Position
US Top R&B/Hip-Hop Albums (Billboard)	89

== Certifications ==
Certifications for In a Perfect World...
Region	Certification	Certified units/sales
New Zealand (RMNZ)	Platinum	15,000^{‡}
United Kingdom (BPI)	Gold	100,000^{‡}
United States (RIAA)	Gold	500,000^{^}
^{^} Shipments figures based on certification alone.^{‡} Sales+streaming figures based on certification alone.

== Release history ==
Region	Date	Edition	Label
Canada	March 24, 2009	Standard	Interscope
United States	March 24, 2009	Standard	Interscope
Switzerland	April 17, 2009	Standard	Universal Music
Czech Republic	April 20, 2009	Standard	Universal Music
Poland	April 24, 2009	Standard	Universal Music
Australia	April 24, 2009	Standard	Interscope
United Kingdom	May 4, 2009	Standard	Polydor
Brazil	May 22, 2009	Standard	Universal Music
Germany	July 12, 2009	Standard	Universal Music
Philippines	July 5, 2009	Standard	Universal Music
Japan	July 8, 2009	Standard	Universal Music
Germany	January 8, 2010	I Like	Universal Music
Poland	April 16, 2010	I Like	Universal Music
Various	November 7, 2025	Vinyl	Interscope
