= Return the Favor =

Single by Keri Hilson featuring Timbaland

from the album In a Perfect World...
- Released: October 7, 2008
- Studio: Zac’s Upstairs (Atlanta); Chung King (New York); Hit Factory Criteria (Miami); The Village (Los Angeles)
- Genre: Electropop; dance-pop; R&B
- Length: 5:28
- Label: Mosley; Zone 4
- Songwriters: Keri Hilson; Timothy Mosley; Ezekiel Lewis; Balewa Muhammad; Candice Nelson; Patrick Smith; Walter Milsap III
- Producer: Timbaland

Keri Hilson singles chronology
| "Superhuman" (2008) | "Return the Favor" (2008) | "Turnin Me On" (2008) |

Timbaland singles chronology
| "Release" (2008) | "Return the Favor" (2008) | "Long Gone" (2008) |

Music video
- "Return the Favor" on YouTube

"Return the Favor" is a song by American singer and songwriter Keri Hilson. The song features American record producer Timbaland, who wrote the song with Hilson and her songwriting/production team The Clutch, as well as Walter Milsap. Following the moderate international chart success of Hilson's lead single, "Energy", "Return the Favor" was released from Hilson's debut album, In a Perfect World..., serving as the international second single while the urban single, "Turnin Me On" was released in the US.

As Hilson's second vocal collaboration with mentor Timbaland, Hilson stated the purpose of the song's initial conception was to re-create the success of their worldwide hit, "The Way I Are", as Timbaland called the "Return the Favor" bigger and better.

The song reached the top twenty in the United Kingdom, Ireland, and Germany, while appearing in the top thirty of Austria and Sweden, charting in Australia and the tip charts in Belgium. The accompanying music video implements a futuristic concept and features Hilson sporting several extravagant outfits.

== Background ==
When Hilson talked to Digital Spy about the song, she said that Timbaland called her and said, "I've got a song that I think's better than 'The Way I Are'. I think it's bigger." They took the track and wrote "Return the Favor" over the beat. According to Hilson, she said that song was partially inspired by "that conversational, back-and-forth thing" they did on "The Way I Are", stating, "We got a great response from that that we wanted to do it again." The initial draft of the hook featured the line "If you kiss me then I’ll kiss you back", but according to Hilson in an interview with That Grape Juice, it was changed by unknown reason by Timbaland. After it was reported that In a Perfect World... would be pushed back to October 2008, "Return the Favor" surfaced online, and it was rumored to be the follow-up to "Energy." The sample was later removed by Hilson's management, before it was announced as the album's second single. The song was featured on December 15, 2008 episode of The Hills.

== Composition and critical reception ==
"Return the Favor"
A sample of "Return the Favor", described to employ Timbaland's "signature dizzying 22nd-century flair."

"Return the Favor" is described as an electro-dance-pop record, with a future-like sound, including euro-style synths. Dan Nishimoto of Prefix Magazine noted that the song includes Timbaland's "signature dizzying 22nd-century flair that he's been employing ever since 2006." Andy Kellman of Allmusic noted the song as a standout track from In a Perfect World.... According to J.K. Glei of Cincinnati Metromix said the song has "cascading synths," and a "classic pop structure." However Glei said that Hilson's vocals "feel flat against the driving beat" and that Timbaland "fully phones it in." While noting the song "follows the same blueprint" of Nelly Furtado's "Promiscuous", Sal Cinquemani of Slant Magazine said it was a "satisfying pop romp" and said even though Hilson lacked Furtado's distinctiveness, that it "shouldn't have a problem striking a chord at radio."

Nick Levine of Digital Spy said, the song was "a perfectly decent slice of midtempo Timba-pop, but it's not really in the same league as the brilliant 'The Way I Are'." MTV Buzzworthy said "slightly less out-there are the beats -- which sound an awful lot like Hilson and Timbaland's first collaboration, "The Way I Are"—and the cameo from Timba himself." Sophie Bruce of BBC Music thought that the song lacked the a catchy hook such as in "The Way I Are." Less than impressed with Timbaland's rapping and "less than sexy" vocal appeal, Jon Caramanica of The New York Times said the "unfortunate pairing" was reprised, and the song "encapsulates the record’s shortcomings."

== Chart performance ==
"Return the Favor" was the most successful in the United Kingdom and Ireland, peaking at nineteen in both countries. In Austria, the song debuted and peaked at twenty-five on the Austrian Singles Chart, before falling off after six weeks. On the Swedish Singles Chart, It debuted and peaked at thirty, before falling off after six weeks on the chart. In Belgium, "Return the Favore" appeared on Belgian Tip Charts, peaking at six in Flanders, and seventeen Wallonia. While debuting and peaking at twenty-one on the German Singles Chart, it completed nine weeks on the chart before falling off. It made the lower regions of the ARIA Singles Chart appearing at eighty.

== Music video ==
A still from the video in which the screen is in fourths, noting the employed usage of television screens in the scene

The music video was directed by Melina, who directed Hilson's video for "Energy." A preview of the video was released on October 14, 2008, and the full video premiered on October 23, 2008. Featuring a futuristic concept, the video begins with a small clip from Timbaland and Hilson's previous hit "The Way I Are", before it cuts to Hilson dancing in a future-like room while scenes are shown on a wall behind Timbaland, who is seated in a chair. Hilson is then show in a pink ruffled bra and dress dancing in front of mirrors, and then rises out of a pool in a blue swimsuit while scenes continue to be broadcast behind a seated Timbaland. Intercut with scenes with previous attire, Hilson performs ensemble choreography with dancers while wearing a black bra and pants, whilst the video ends with several different scenes.

MTV Buzzworthy commended the video, stating, "while her ensemble's slightly more unwearable (we're looking at YOU, futuristic metallic onesie!) Hilson still manages to look beyond gorge. But then again, this chick could look cutting-edge in a giant pickle barrel." The review also compared Timbaland's look a cross between Run D.M.C. and The Matrix.

== Track listing ==
- European Promo CD
1. "Return the Favor" (Radio Version) – 3:40
2. "Return the Favor" (Main Version) – 5:30
3. "Return the Favor" (Instrumental) – 5:29
- UK Digital Download - Single
1. "Return the Favor" – 5:29

German Maxi CD

1. "Return the Favor" (Radio Edit) – 3:38
2. "Return the Favor" (Sketch Iz Dead Remix) – 4:40
3. "Return the Favor" (Instrumental) – 5:48
4. "Return the Favor" (Video) – 3:53

== Personnel ==
Credits lifted from the liner notes of In a Perfect World....

- Songwriters – Timothy Mosley, Keri Hilson, Ezekiel Lewis, Bulewa Muhammed, Patrick Smith, Candice Nelson, Walter Millsap III
- Production – Timbaland
- Editors – Walter Millsap III, Dave (d-lo), Marcella Araica
- Recording – Scott Naughton
- Mixing – Demacio Castellon
- Vocal arrangement – The Clutch
- Additional production, vocal production – Walter Millsap III

== Charts ==
Weekly chart performance for "Return the Favor"
| Chart (2009) | Peak position |
|---|---|
| Australia (ARIA) | 80 |
| Australian Urban (ARIA) | 22 |
| Austria (Ö3 Austria Top 40) | 25 |
| Belgium (Ultratip Bubbling Under Flanders) | 6 |
| Belgium (Ultratip Bubbling Under Wallonia) | 17 |
| Czech Republic Airplay (ČNS IFPI) | 21 |
| Germany (GfK) | 21 |
| Ireland (IRMA) | 19 |
| Scottish Singles Sales (Official Charts) | 10 |
| Sweden (Sverigetopplistan) | 30 |
| UK Singles (Official Charts) | 19 |
| UK Hip Hop/R&B (Official Charts) | 7 |

== Release history ==
Release dates and formats for "Return the Favor"
| Region | Date | Format(s) | Label | Ref. |
|---|---|---|---|---|
| United States | October 7, 2008 | Digital download | Mosley; Zone 4 | |
| Australia | March 27, 2009 | Digital download | Mosley; Zone 4 | |
| United Kingdom | April 12, 2009 | Digital download | Mosley; Zone 4 | |
