= Make Love (Keri Hilson song) =

Single by Keri Hilson

from the album In a Perfect World...
- Released: June 23, 2009
- Studio: No Excuses Studio, Santa Monica
- Genre: R&B
- Length: 5:22
- Label: Mosley; Zone 4
- Songwriters: Jamal Jones; Ester Dean; Jason Perry
- Producers: Polow da Don; Jason Perry

Keri Hilson singles chronology
| "Knock You Down" (2009) | "Make Love" (2009) | "Slow Dance" (2009) |

Music video
- "Keri Hilson - Make Love" on YouTube

"Make Love" is a song performed by American singer and songwriter Keri Hilson. It was written by Jamal "Polow da Don" Jones, Ester Dean, and Jason Perry, and produced by Polow da Don and Perry for Hilson's debut studio album, In a Perfect World... (2009). The song was sent for urban adult contemporary airplay on June 23, 2009, as the fifth single from the album. Musically, "Make Love" is a downtempo R&B ballad. The song received mixed reviews from music critics; some of them criticized its long length and Hilson's vocals, while others named it one of the album's standouts.

After being sent out for radio airplay, "Make Love" reached number ten on the Bubbling Under R&B/Hip-Hop Singles chart, but received no direct promotion. However, three months before the single's release, a music video for the song, directed by Matt Barnes, was released and served as a viral commercial for In a Perfect World... The clip features rapper Kanye West, who appears on the album's previous single, "Knock You Down".

== Background and composition ==
Keri Hilson – "Make Love"
"Make Love" is a slow jam influenced by mid-'90s R&B and works by singer Ciara.

"Make Love" was written by Jamal "Polow da Don" Jones, Ester Dean, and Jason Perry, and produced by Polow da Don and co-produced by Perry. Hilson produced the vocals, which were recorded by Bryan Jones at No Excuses Studio in Santa Monica, California with assistance from Bryan Morton. The recordings were later mixed by Jean Marie Horvat. Perry and Titus Johnson played keyboards on the song, and Thomas Drayton contributed guitars. The song is one of three tracks on In a Perfect World... that Hilson did not co-write. The song was used in a viral commercial prior to the album's release in March 2009, and was later sent for urban adult contemporary airplay on June 23, 2009, as the fifth single from the album.

Hilson explained that she is "stripping down and unwinding" with "Make Love", calling it real and natural. She described it as self-explanatory, saying that it speaks of reviving love and "keeping things very interesting". "A woman has to know when to set the pace because that's what men need. So that's what the song is about", she said. Musically, "Make Love" is an R&B ballad, set in a slinky slow jam groove. Patrick Varine of The Observer-Dispatch referred it to as a "hacky mid-'90s R&B" song, and its slow tempo was compared to ballads by American singer Ciara. According to Mariel Concepcion of Billboard, the song sees Hilson tapping into her vulnerable side.

== Reception ==
=== Reviews ===
The song received mixed reviews from music critics. Sophie Bruce of BBC Music, Michael Wood of the Los Angeles Times, and a writer for Rap-Up named the song one of the album's highlights. Quentin B. Huff of PopMatters was positive, writing that the song and "Slow Dance" "tend to provide better matches between the vocals and the music, since the backdrop keeps things simple and the lyrics don’t always fall into slang and unintentional irony". Sal Cinquemani of Slant Magazine wrote that the album's problem is the slow numbers, including "Make Love". Cinquemani said that the song requires a "much more talented vocalist to elevate it above mere filler". Steve Jones of USA Today named it a track to skip, and Glenn Gamboa of Newsday also dismissed the song, writing that it "seems to go on forever, especially following the similarly too-long, too-drawn-out 'Slow Dance'". Tracy Garraud of Vibe wrote that its chords "sound more like a Disney princess' cue than a royal highness' arrival and Hilson's fairy-dusted vocals sound more platonic than carnal".

=== Chart performance ===
Following its release as a radio single, "Make Love" debuted at number 14 on the Bubbling Under R&B/Hip-Hop Singles chart in the issue dated July 18, 2009. The next week, it dropped to number 19. In the issue dated August 8, 2009, it reached its peak position of number ten. The song spent five weeks on the chart in total.

== Music video ==
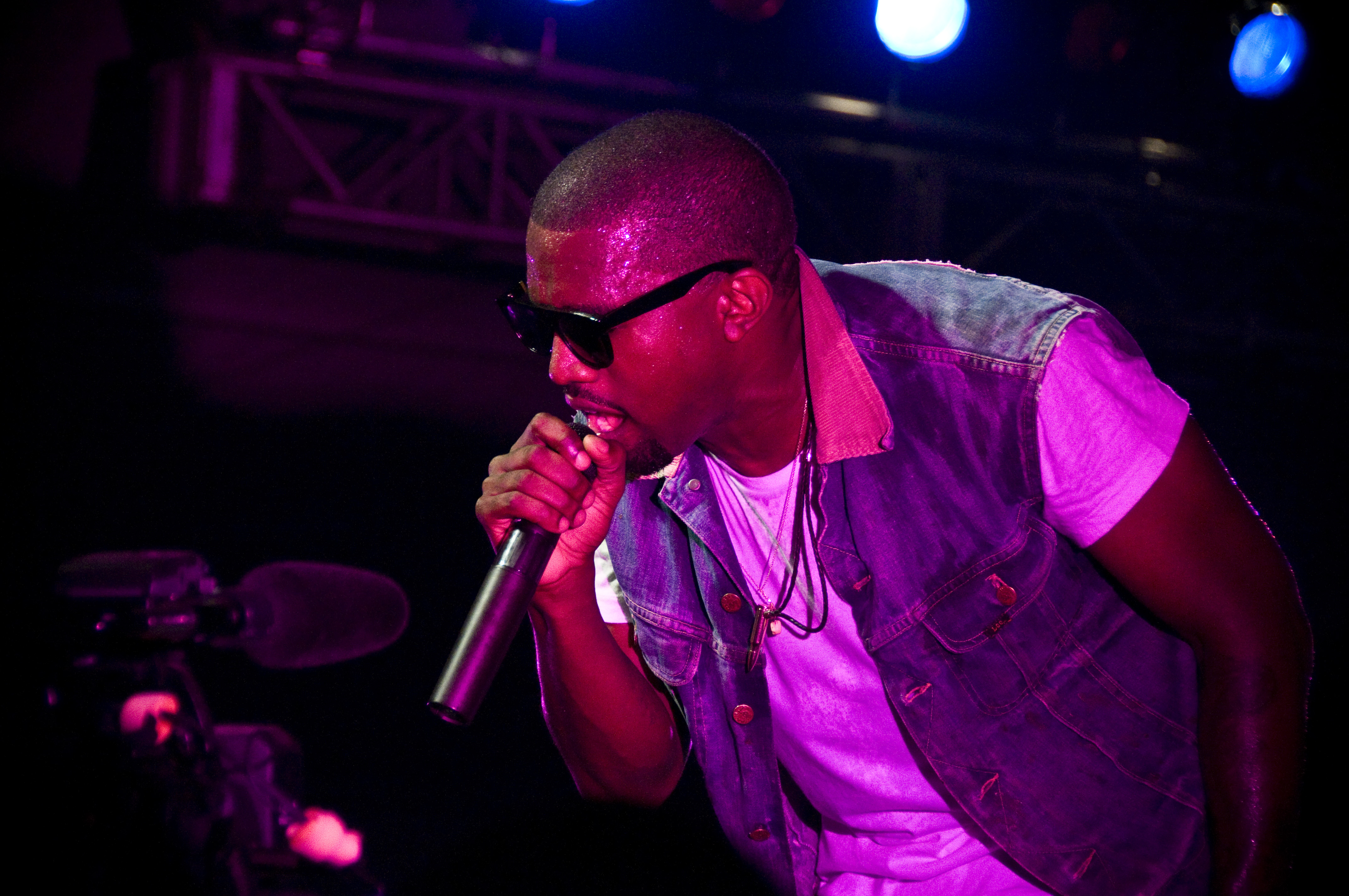
Kanye West plays Hilson's partner in the video for "Make Love".

The music video for "Make Love" was directed by Matt Barnes. The clip premiered on March 9, 2009 and served as a viral commercial for In a Perfect World... Barnes referred the video to as a short film, noting that it has the form of a music video but there is no performance in it. Hilson said that the opening scene of her entering her apartment represents her coming home from the studio on a normal day. She explained that the song and video show that the album has "real songs", not just uptempo ones for clubs. The video guest stars Kanye West, who contributed vocals to "Knock You Down", one of the album's tracks.

The video begins with Hilson as she comes home to her apartment and starts playing "Make Love" on a rough cut CD of In a Perfect World... After taking off her jacket, she sits down on the couch in the living room. In another room, West is seen getting out of bed. Hilson leaves for the kitchen where she puts out champagne and chocolate-dipped strawberries. She then gets ready in the bathroom while West waits in the bedroom. When Hilson is finished, she joins him in bed and they start cuddling and kissing. The video ends with Hilson looking into the camera over West's shoulder.

== Credits and personnel ==
- Songwriting – Jamal "Polow da Don" Jones, Ester Dean, Jason Perry
- Production – Polow da Don
- Co-production – Jason Perry
- Additional keyboards – Jason Perry, Titus Jackson
- Guitars – Thomas Drayton
- Vocal production – Keri Hilson
- Mixing – Jean Marie Horvart

Credits are adapted from the In a Perfect World... album liner notes.

== Charts ==
| Chart (2009) | Peak position |
|---|---|
| US Bubbling Under R&B/Hip-Hop Singles (Billboard) | 10 |
