= The Way I Are =

2007 single by Timbaland

Single by Timbaland featuring Keri Hilson and D.O.E.

from the album Shock Value
- Released: June 12, 2007
- Studio: Thomas Crown (Virginia Beach, Virginia)
- Genre: Electrohop; electro-funk
- Length: 2:59 (album version); 3:20 (radio edit); 3:34 (extended/music video version)
- Label: Mosley; Blackground; Interscope
- Songwriters: Tim Mosley; Nate Hills; Keri Hilson; The Clutch; Candice Nelson; John Maultsby
- Producers: Timbaland; Danja

Timbaland singles chronology
"Give It to Me" (2007)	"The Way I Are" (2007)	"Apologize" (2007)

Keri Hilson singles chronology
"Help" (2006)	"The Way I Are" (2007)	"Scream" (2007)

Sebastian singles chronology
"Kill Yourself" (2007)	"The Way I Are" (2007)	"Number One Fan (Remix)" (2007)

Music video
- "The Way I Are" on YouTube

"The Way I Are" is a song by American record producer and rapper Timbaland, released by Mosley Music Group, Blackground Records and Interscope Records on June 12, 2007 as the second single from his second studio album, Shock Value (2007). Three versions of the song exist: all of which feature vocals from American singer-songwriter Keri Hilson. The radio version is a duet between her and Timbaland, and is included on international editions on her debut album In a Perfect World... (2009); the album version features both Hilson and Mosely Music Group-signed rapper D.O.E., while the music video version features Hilson, D.O.E., and Sebastian, Timbaland's brother. The aforementioned artists co-wrote the song with Danja, the Clutch, and Candice Nelson, with Timbaland producing and Danja co-producing. "The Way I Are" is an electrohop song with influences of R&B and dance music that help create its futuristic sound; its lyrics are based on the theme of role reversal and sensuous desires.

The song peaked at number three on the Billboard Hot 100 and sold over 3,000,000 units in the United States. It became Timbaland's second solo single to reach the top five in the country as well as his second longest-running single there, behind "Apologize". Internationally, "The Way I Are" reached number one in several countries including Australia, Canada, Denmark, Ireland, and the United Kingdom. Elsewhere, the song reached the top five in several other countries, including Austria, France, Germany, and New Zealand. It was the second-bestselling song of 2007 in Europe.

The accompanying music video was directed by Shane Drake and takes place in a dark alley-like area in Salford, England. The extended version, which was used in the music video, also features Timbaland's brother Sebastian and rapper D.O.E., who both contribute an extra verse after the bridge. The director noted that the influence of making the video came from the sound of the song and used the rhythm and beats to add effects to make the video have an edgy appeal. "The Way I Are" received a nomination for Monster Single of the Year at the MTV Video Music Awards, as well as a nomination under the Producer of the Year (Non-Classical), listed with other songs produced by Timbaland and released during 2007, at the 50th Annual Grammy Awards.

== Background ==
"The Way I Are" was written and composed by Timbaland, Keri Hilson, D.O.E., Danja, The Clutch, and Candice Nelson. Timbaland and Danja also handled production. Danja collaborated with Timbaland on other songs from the Shock Value album, including "Give It to Me" and "Come and Get Me". Danja has also collaborated with Hilson on other songs on the album as well as songs for Britney Spears' fifth studio album, Blackout (2007), which include "Gimme More", "Break the Ice" and "Perfect Lover".

Recording for the song, along with all the songs from the album, was handled by Demacio "Demo" Castellon and took place at Timbaland's private recording studio, Thomas Crown Studios, in Virginia Beach, Virginia. Marcella Araica mixed the song at Pacifique Recording Studios in North Hollywood, California. The instruments were handled by Timbaland, who provided the drums, and Danja, who provided the drums and keys. The song was edited through ProTools by Ron Taylor. "The Way I Are" was released as the second single from Shock Value, after "Give It to Me". Mosley Music Group, in association with Blackground Records and Interscope Records, sent the song to contemporary hit and rhythmic radios on June 12, 2007.

== Composition ==
"The Way I Are"
A 15-second sample of the chorus of "The Way I Are", which features Hilson and Timbaland singing about an exchange of sexual performances for money.

"The Way I Are" is an electrohop and electro-funk song with a length of two minutes and fifty-nine seconds. It is written in the key of G♯ minor and is set in common time with a tempo of approximately 115 beats per minute. The song incorporates heavy elements of R&B, dance and electronic music and has been noted by critics to exhibit a futuristic sound. It is built upon a club beat and heavy synths. The lyrics are centered around the theme of sexual desire and role reversal; Timbaland explains that he is flat broke, while Hilson replies that she does not care about any of that, and jokes that she can pay him to strip. Kelefa Sanneh of The New York Times described the track as a "swirling electronic come-on" while Luke Bainbridge of The Observer labelled it as "futuristic disco".

== Critical reception ==
Critics found the song to share similarities with works by American singer-songwriter Justin Timberlake, who has worked with Timbaland on numerous occasions, from his second studio album FutureSex/LoveSounds (2006). Mike Schiller of PopMatters compared the synthesizers on the song to those utilized in Timberlake's single "My Love" (2006), which both him and Timbaland share songwriting and production credits. Sal Cinquemani of Slant Magazine felt the same way, describing the synth line as "booming" and "futuristic". Norman Meyers of Prefix compared the song to Timberlake's "SexyBack". Nate Patrin of Pitchfork Magazine described the song as "'Push It' gone trance".

Norman Meyers of Prefix took a liking to the song, stating it and "Release" (featuring Justin Timberlake) as "successful tracks". Luke Bainbridge of The Observer also shared interest in the track, labeling it along with "Release" and "Bounce" as "standout tracks", while Andy Kellman of AllMusic did the same with the song along with three other songs from the Shock Value album. Daniel Incognito of Sputnikmusic praised the song's structure, writing "The pulsating synth melody throughout the song is as irresistible as its My Love counterpart, and a sure fire way to get everybody on the dance floor." Incognito also fell in favor of the vocals provided by Timbaland's protégé, Keri Hilson, writing "Her plush R&B vocals fit into Timbaland's construction perfectly, never allowing the strong melody to dominate her vocals, but instead matching it in terms of lure." Nate Patrin of Pitchfork Magazine describes the song as a "straight up jaw-dropper." Nathan S. of DJBooth.net labeled it, along with three other songs from the album, as recipes for success while noting that they sounded "safe" compared to the rest of the album.

Ivan Rott of About.com was less enthusiastic of the song, deeming it mediocre and stating that it was "veering off into a no-man's land of repetitive synth-heavy electronica". Andrea Park of The Online Gargoyle shared the same thoughts in her review of the album, stating that "The flat quality of this album was most apparent in the five songs with accompanying female vocalists." "The Way I Are" received a nomination at the 2007 MTV Video Music Awards for "Monster Single of the Year" along with nine other musicians, but lost to Rihanna's "Umbrella". Timbaland also received a nomination at the 2008 Grammys for Producer of the Year (Non-Classical) for his work on this song and many others released during 2007. On December 11, 2007, Apple released the lists of iTunes' top 10 most-downloaded albums and songs of 2007 and "The Way I Are" was revealed to be the ninth best selling single on iTunes. Vibe Magazine listed "The Way I Are" as the thirty-third best song of 2007, commenting that "the true genius is spotlighting ingénue Keri Hilson".

== Chart performance ==
In the United States, the song entered the Billboard Hot 100 at number 78 on the issue dated June 16, 2007. After ten weeks of ascending the chart, it peaked at number three on the issue dated August 25, 2007, after an increase in airplay, becoming the week's greatest airplay gainer. The song stayed on the position for four non-consecutive weeks. "The Way I Are" reached the summit of the U.S. Billboard Pop Songs on the issue dated September 15, 2007, and stayed there for three consecutive weeks. The song ranked 18th on the Billboard Hot 100 year-end chart for 2007 as well as ranking number four on the 2000s decade on the Pop Songs chart compiled by Billboard. According to Nielsen SoundScan, the song has sold over 3,000,000 copies in the United States as of April 4, 2012. On the issue dated June 2, 2007, the song debuted on the Canadian Hot 100 at number 44. In it sixth week on the chart, it moved into the top ten region at number seven and, after weeks of ascending the chart, reached the top position, where it lasted for three weeks. It was present on the chart for a total of 52 weeks, becoming Timbaland's second-longest-running single in the country, only behind "Apologize" with OneRepublic (61 weeks).

In the United Kingdom, the song debuted at number 18 on the UK Singles Chart on July 1, 2007 ― for the week ending date July 7, 2007. On July 29, 2007 ― for the week ending date August 4, 2007 ― it ascended to the top of the chart, ending Rihanna and Jay Z's ten-week reign at the summit with "Umbrella" and becoming Timbaland's second chart-topping song in Britain following "Give It to Me". It maintained the top position for two weeks and became his second longest-running single there (36 weeks), behind "Apologize" (42 weeks) and ahead of "Give It to Me" (26 weeks). The week it remained at number one followed one of the closest chart races in history; "The Way I Are" was just 16 copies ahead of Kate Nash's "Foundations", with the two songs selling 33,578 and 33,562 copies, resepectively.

In Ireland, "The Way I Are" peaked at number one on the Irish Singles Chart and held that position for five consecutive weeks. It was present within the top ten for sixteen weeks and lasted a total of 30 weeks on the chart.

In Denmark, "The Way I Are" entered the Danish Singles Chart at number five as the highest debut of the week. The following week it rose to number one where it maintained that position for ten consecutive weeks, becoming Timbaland's most successful single in the country as well as highest selling song there, receiving the certification of triple platinum.

In Australia, after ascending the chart following its debut at number five, the track peaked at number one on the Australian Singles Chart for two weeks. It was later certified platinum by the Australian Recording Industry Association (ARIA) denoting sales of 70,000 units.

In New Zealand, the song debuted at number 38 on the New Zealand Singles Chart on the week ending June 11, 2007. It quickly ascended into the top ten and reached a peak of number two on the issue dated July 23, 2007. It was certified gold on August 20, 2007, by the Recording Industry Association of New Zealand (RIANZ) denoting shipments of 7,500 units.

== Music video ==
The music video for the song was directed by Shane Drake and was filmed in Salford, United Kingdom on May 18, 2007. Drake commented on the video and said:

I like to tell stories with my videos — and Timbaland's new video is going to be unlike any other. Utilizing the tools of incendiary cinematography and fierce lighting schemes, I plan to sculpt an edgy masterpiece, oozing with style and impact. With each rhythmic pulse and beat we will time crafty edits, sharp as tacks and smooth as steel. This video is going to be an artistic expression of Timbaland's music. As an added element of force and velocity, we will follow Timbaland as he cruises around the city. From the colors like pink and blue, to the wardrobe — to the edits, we will craft a slick masterpiece that defies genre and truly defines cool & will show off Timbaland in a "super" music video.

The video version of the song includes an extra verse from Timbaland's brother Sebastian. This verse was added to 'pad out' the song, as the album version of the song has an elongated period of time in which nothing but the beat is played. Though being unusual for American music video productions, the video world premiered and received its first official airing on June 15 on the German music television channel VIVA. The video also includes three British freestyle football players. A "director's cut" of the video is now on YouTube and it features Timbaland in a black cab and shows him in a more casual perspective. The music video has received over 700 million views on YouTube.

== Live performances and usage in media ==
Timbaland performed "The Way I Are" with Keri Hilson, alongside "Do It" with Nelly Furtado and "LoveStoned/I Think She Knows" with Justin Timberlake, at the 2007 MTV Video Music Awards. At the 2009 Grammy Award show pre-party, Timbaland performed the song with Hilson while she performed two songs from her debut album In a Perfect World..., "Energy" and "Turnin Me On". On October 9, 2007, Timbaland performed "The Way I Are" with Keri Hilson on an episode of the ABC soap opera One Life to Live, alongside "Apologize" with OneRepublic. "The Way I Are" was featured in commercials for McDonald's. It was also featured on the MTV reality show The Hills on its fifth episode for its third season. The song was also used on the CW television drama Gossip Girl during the pilot episode on its first season. In video games, the song is also featured as downloadable content (DLC) on Dance Central, as well as an exclusive routine on Just Dance 2021's Just Dance Unlimited. In television, James Corden and Ariana Grande sang the first few parts of the song at The Late Late Show with James Corden.

It additionally appears on the soundtracks for NBA Live 08 and Fortnite Festival.

== Credits and personnel ==
Credits adapted from the liner notes of Shock Value, Mosley Music Group, in association with Blackground Records, Spirit Halloween and Interscope Records.

Recording and mixing

- Recorded at Thomas Crown Studios in Virginia Beach, Virginia
- Mixed at Pacifique Recording Studios in North Hollywood, California

Personnel

- Songwriting - Tim Mosley, Nate Hills, Keri Hilson, Balewa Muhammad, Candice Nelson, John Maultsby
- Production - Timbaland, Danja (co-producer)
- Recording - Demacio "Demo" Castellon for Storm-Circle Entertainment
- Mixing - Marcella Araica
- Drums - Timbaland, Danja
- Keys - Danja

== Track listings ==
UK CD single

1. "The Way I Are" (featuring D.O.E., Keri Hilson and Sebastian) – 3:34
2. "The Way I Are" (Timbaland vs. Nephew) (featuring D.O.E. and Keri Hilson) – 3:50

European enhanced maxi-single

1. "The Way I Are" (radio edit) (featuring Keri Hilson) – 3:19
2. "Give It to Me" (Laugh at 'em) Remix (featuring Justin Timberlake and Jay-Z) – 3:20
3. "The Way I Are" (Timbaland vs. Nephew) (featuring D.O.E. and Keri Hilson) – 3:50
4. "The Way I Are" (video)

French CD single

1. "The Way I Are" (French version) (featuring Tyssem) – 3:23
2. "The Way I Are" (radio edit) (featuring Keri Hilson) – 3:19

Steve Aoki Pimpin Remix

1. "The Way I Are (Steve Aoki Pimpin Remix) – 4:11

== Charts ==
=== Weekly charts ===
Chart (2007)	Peak position
Australia (ARIA)	1
Australian Urban (ARIA)	1
Austria (Ö3 Austria Top 40)	4
Belgium (Ultratop 50 Flanders)	2
Belgium (Ultratop 50 Wallonia)	2
Canada Hot 100 (Billboard)	1
CIS Airplay (TopHit)	5
Croatia (HRT)	2
Czech Republic Airplay (ČNS IFPI)	4
Denmark (Tracklisten)	1
Europe (Eurochart Hot 100)	1
Finland (Suomen virallinen lista)	4
France (SNEP)	2
Germany (GfK)	5
Hungary (Rádiós Top 40)	1
Hungary (Dance Top 40)	3
Ireland (IRMA)	1
Italy (FIMI)	14
Latvia (Latvian Airplay Top 50)	2
Lithuania (EHR)	1
Netherlands (Dutch Top 40)	3
Netherlands (Single Top 100)	4
New Zealand (Recorded Music NZ)	2
Norway (VG-lista)	1
Romania (Romanian Top 100)	5
Russia Airplay (TopHit)	6
Scottish Singles Sales (Official Charts)	1
Slovakia Airplay (ČNS IFPI)	6
Sweden (Sverigetopplistan)	2
Switzerland (Schweizer Hitparade)	3
UK Hip Hop/R&B (Official Charts)	1
UK Singles (Official Charts)	1
US Billboard Hot 100	3
US Adult Pop Airplay (Billboard)	30
US Dance Club Songs (Billboard)	33
US Dance Airplay (Billboard)	1
US Hot R&B/Hip-Hop Songs (Billboard)	59
US Pop Airplay (Billboard)	1
US Pop 100 (Billboard)	1
US Rhythmic Airplay (Billboard)	4
Venezuela Pop Rock (Record Report)	2

2024–2026 weekly chart performance for "The Way I Are"
Chart (2024–2025)	Peak position
Greece International (IFPI)	57
Lithuania (AGATA)	93
Poland (Polish Airplay Top 100)	84
UK R&B (Official Charts)	8

=== Year-end charts ===
Chart (2007)	Position
Australia (ARIA)	11
Australian Urban (ARIA)	5
Austria (Ö3 Austria Top 75)	23
Belgium (Ultratop 50 Flanders)	11
Belgium (Ultratop 40 Wallonia)	17
Brazil (Crowley)	91
CIS (TopHit)	32
Europe (Eurochart Hot 100)	2
France (SNEP)	13
Germany (Media Control GfK)	13
Hungary (Dance Top 40)	26
Hungary (Rádiós Top 40)	33
Ireland (IRMA)	4
Netherlands (Dutch Top 40)	11
Netherlands (Single Top 100)	14
New Zealand (RIANZ)	3
Romania (Romanian Top 100)	21
Russia Airplay (TopHit)	44
Sweden (Sverigetopplistan)	22
Switzerland (Schweizer Hitparade)	21
UK Singles (OCC)	7
UK Urban (Music Week)	4
US Billboard Hot 100	18
US Hot Dance Airplay (Billboard)	23
US Pop 100 (Billboard)	16
US Rhythmic Airplay (Billboard)	11

Chart (2008)	Position
Australia (ARIA)	83
Canada (Canadian Hot 100)	46
CIS (TopHit)	88
Europe (Eurochart Hot 100)	76
Germany (Media Control GfK)	170
Hungary (Dance Top 40)	41
Hungary (Rádiós Top 40)	4
Russia Airplay (TopHit)	82
Switzerland (Schweizer Hitparade)	81
UK Singles (OCC)	154
US Billboard Hot 100	96

=== Decade-end charts ===
Chart (2000–2009)	Position
Australia (ARIA)	82
Austria (Ö3 Austria Top 75)	41
CIS Airplay (TopHit)	54
Russia Airplay (TopHit)	40
US Billboard Hot 100	53
US Mainstream Top 40 (Billboard)	4

== Certifications ==
Region	Certification	Certified units/sales
Australia (ARIA)	Platinum	70,000^{^}
Belgium (BRMA)	Gold	25,000^{*}
Canada (Music Canada)	3× Platinum	240,000^{‡}
Denmark (IFPI Danmark)	4× Platinum	60,000^{^}
Germany (BVMI)	5× Gold	750,000^{‡}
Italy (FIMI)	Platinum	100,000^{‡}
New Zealand (RMNZ)	6× Platinum	180,000^{‡}
Spain (Promusicae)	Gold	30,000^{‡}
Sweden (GLF)	Platinum	20,000^{^}
Switzerland (IFPI Switzerland)	Platinum	30,000^{^}
United Kingdom (BPI)	3× Platinum	1,800,000^{‡}
United States (RIAA)	3× Platinum	3,000,000^{*}
Streaming
Greece (IFPI Greece)	3× Platinum	6,000,000^{†}
^{*} Sales figures based on certification alone.^{^} Shipments figures based on certification alone.^{‡} Sales+streaming figures based on certification alone.^{†} Streaming-only figures based on certification alone.
