= Turnin Me On =

Single by Keri Hilson featuring Lil Wayne

from the album In a Perfect World...
- Released: December 19, 2008
- Studio: Zac's Recording Studio (Atlanta, Georgia); Chalice Recording Studios (Los Angeles, California)
- Genre: R&B
- Length: 4:08
- Label: Mosley; Zone 4
- Songwriters: Keri Hilson; Dwayne Carter; Jamal Jones; Zachary Anson Wallace
- Producers: Polow da Don; Danja (additional)

Keri Hilson singles chronology
"Return the Favor" (2008)	"Turnin Me On" (2008)	"Knock You Down" (2009)

Lil Wayne singles chronology
"All My Life (In the Ghetto)" (2008)	"Turnin Me On" (2008)	"Unstoppable" (2009)

Music video
- "Keri Hilson - Turnin Me On (Official Music Video) ft. Lil Wayne" on YouTube

"Turnin Me On" is a song by American singer-songwriter Keri Hilson, from her debut album, In a Perfect World... The song features a rap verse with singing vocals from American rapper Lil Wayne who co-wrote the song alongside Hilson and Zachary Anson Wallace. Production credits are shared between Danja and Polow da Don, who also co-wrote the song. Following the minimal chart success of Hilson's worldwide lead single "Energy" in the United States, international markets received "Return the Favor", while "Turnin Me On" was released as the third single in the US.

After experimenting with more pop-oriented music in her previous mentioned songs, Hilson opted for a more urban, hip-hop flavored sound for the song, due to her wanting to keep to her roots. While noting her less than stellar vocals on the track, critics praised Hilson's sassiness and attitude on the track and complimented Lil Wayne's verse, which has been called the best surprise rap since Lisa "Left Eye" Lopes on TLC's "Waterfalls." The song's accompanying music video features intricate Aaliyah and "Soldier"-esque choreography, dance scenes such as the Bird Walk, and Hilson being flaunted by men. The scenes are intercut with mirror scenes with younger kids.

The song was a commercial success in the United States, reaching number fifteen on the Billboard Hot 100, whilst reaching two on the Hot R&B/Hip-Hop Songs chart. "Turnin Me On" received two nominations at the 2009 BET Awards, and a "Song of the Year" nomination at the 2009 Soul Train Music Awards. A leaked remix of the song caused controversy, with rumors that Hilson was taking shots at fellow female R&B singers Beyoncé Knowles and Ciara; however, Hilson has fervently denied the rumors that it was a diss. Hilson performed the song as a part of a medley at the 2009 Soul Train Music Awards and BET Awards.

== Background ==
In June 2008, Rap-Up originally reported the song as "Turn Off", while Hilson was playing it at Interscope-Geffen-A&M Records' second annual "Creme of the Crop" post-BET Awards dinner on June 25, 2008. Then an unmastered version of "Turn Off" was leaked online in September 2008. After selecting the predominantly pop-sounding "Energy" and "Return the Favor", Hilson selected "Turnin Me On" as In a Perfect World...'s third single. When asked in an interview with That Grape Juice if choosing the song was a conscious effort, since the song had a different sound than the previous singles, Hilson responded,

"Absolutely! I mean, there’s another side of me. I’m from Decatur, Georgia and that is a predominantly black neighbourhood with a lot of lower-class and some middle-class neighbourhoods. I guess that is the song that probably properly describes the type of girl I am, in relation to where I’m from. So yeah, it was definitely a conscious effort to make sure that I stay close to home on some records."

== Composition and critical reception ==
"Turnin Me On"
A sample of "Turnin Me On", described as bass-heavy, futuristic hip-hop.

The song is a futuristic-esque R&B, synth-driven, bass-heavy urban song, featuring "bouncy" horn samples. Written in the key of C minor the song is in a "moderate R&B groove". It is set in common time and Hilson's vocals span from the low note of G_{3} to the high note of C_{5} " "Turnin Me On" is lyrically about physical attraction and composed in a hard-edged tone." MTV Buzzworthy described the song "as one-part Rihanna 'Umbrella' and two parts Beyoncé 'Ring the Alarm'"

Naming it a standout track from In a Perfect World... Andy Kellman of AllMusic called the song a "coquettish trunk rattler." Barry Walters of Spin complimented Hilson's "sassiness" on the song which she "wore well." MTV Buzzworthy called the Wayne's verse "the best surprise rap since Lisa 'Left Eye' Lopes' verse in TLC's 'Waterfalls.'" J.K. Glei of Cincinnati Metromix called the track "playful" and said the track was easily the album's standout, commenting that Lil Wayne's cameo "steals the show." Sal Cinquemani of Slant Magazine commended the song, calling it "tight." Jon Caramanica of The New York Times said called the song "slinky" and said, "the busyness coheres, with Ms. Hilson neatly gliding among the song’s many layers. And she may need the crutch; she is a careful, slight singer." Mikael Wood of The Los Angeles Times called the song "impeccably arranged." After watching the video, a writer for BET Sound Off said after it seemed Hilson and her label were losing faith, that "out of nowhere, Keri got her ish together", and said, "I’m sure she’ll regain the steam she lost during her first two singles." Rap-Up called "Turnin Me On" a standout track from In a Perfect World.... The song received several accolades, as it was nominated for "Viewers' Choice" and "Best Collaboration" at the 2009 BET Awards. Additionally it was nominated for "Song of the Year" at the 2009 Soul Train Music Awards.

== Chart performance ==
On the issue date of January 3, 2009, "Turnin Me On" entered the Billboard Hot 100 at number ninety. In its sixth week on the chart, it reached number thirty-five, giving Hilson her second top forty hit at a solo or featured artist. It later reached number fifteen, where it spent two weeks, becoming Hilson's biggest hit until the top five hit, "Knock You Down." Overall, the song had a twenty-two-week stint on the Hot 100. Additionally it charted at twenty-eight on the now defunct Pop 100, and twenty-five on the Pop Songs chart, reaching the peak after seven weeks. On the week of February 28, 2009, in its eighteenth week on the chart, it peaked at two on the Hot R&B/Hip-Hop Songs chart. It debuted at number eighty in Canada, where it peaked, spending a total of four weeks on the Canadian Hot 100. The song peaked and debuted at twenty-nine on the New Zealand Singles Chart. It fell to thirty-three the following week, and falling off the next week, completing a two-week stint on the chart.

== Music video ==
The music video for the single was directed by Erik White and shot in Atlanta, Georgia. It premiered on November 19, 2008, two weeks before the single was released for airplay or download. It was featured on E! News on December 15, 2008. Rich Boy, Polow da Don, and Leah LaBelle make cameos in the clip. While it was reported that T.I. would appear in the video, a doppelgänger does instead. The video is set almost entirely behind white and black backdrops, besides one club scene. Hilson performs choreography such as the Bird Walk, which according to MTV Buzzworthy is Aaliyah-style choreography, while being flaunted by shirtless, muscular men and donning "on" and "off" finger rings. BET Sound Off noted that some of the choreography was similar to Destiny's Child's "Soldier." As Hilson continues to be flaunted and performs additional choreography, which includes crumping-like moves, the scenes are interspersed with younger kids re-enacting the same scenes. Hilson appears alongside a speaker and a group of men dancing before the video cuts to Wayne. In this scene the rapper delivers his verse alongside Hilson in front of a black backdrop and on a couch. Near the end the younger girls and boys are shown performing Hilson and her dancers' moves, as the latter also continue to be flaunted by men. The video ends with Hilson being turned off by men at a club, with women in the club wearing "off" earrings like on Hilson's fingers.

MTV Buzzworthy said, "give it up for her sleek biker chick-meets-Park-Slope wardrobe and feel free to ogle/drool over the parade of shirtless dudes who look like they jumped off the cover of Abs Weekly magazine." The review also complimented "rapper/pants-dropper extraodinaire Lil Wayne" who helped "push her chest-bumpin' vid into must-see territory." Although calling it a "Soldier" knock-off, BET Sound Off blog said, "the visual is pretty entertaining." Tracey Ford of AOL Boombox said, "the diva makes it perfectly clear how easy it is to turn a woman on and off." The video ranked at number two on BET: Notarized Top 100 Videos of 2009 countdown.

== Live performances ==
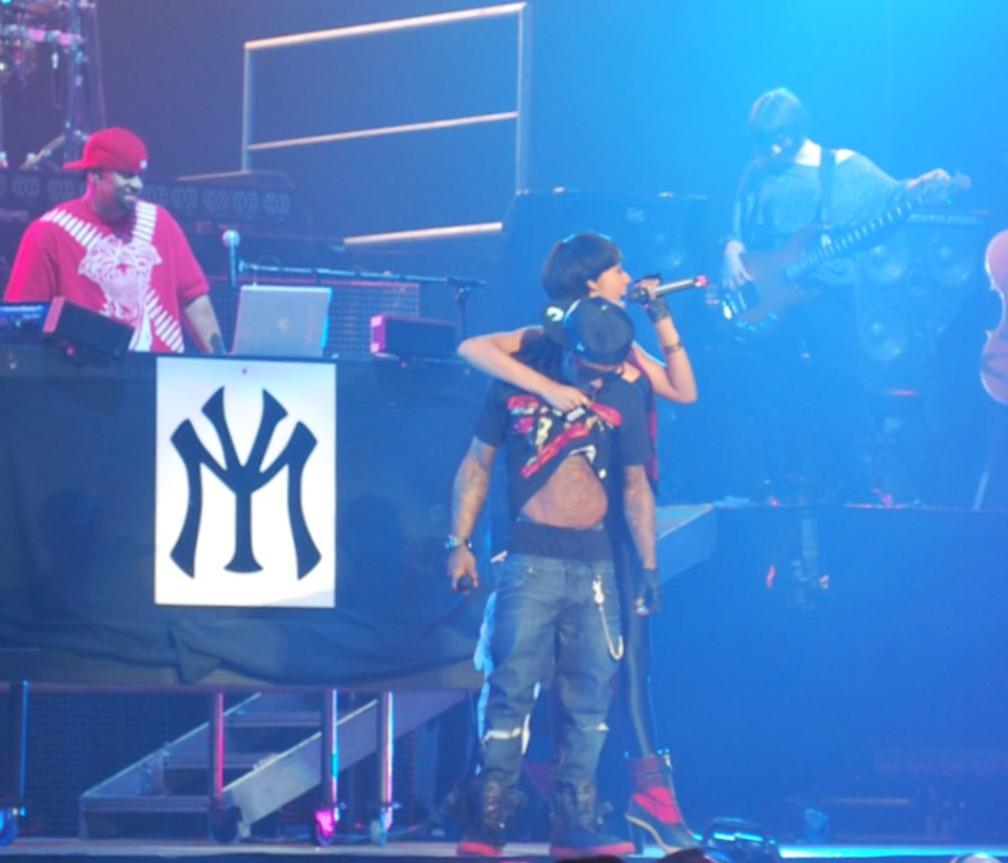
Hilson and Lil Wayne performing "Turnin' Me On" at General Motors Place in Vancouver

In promoting her album, Hilson performed the song on February 2, 2009, on 106 & Park. Hilson performed the song on March 17, 2009, on Dogg After Dark. Lil Wayne joined her to perform the song with "Energy" on Jimmy Kimmel Live! "Turnin Me On" was performed by Hilson at BET's Spring Bling 2009, and at BET's Rip the Runway 2009. She performed the song as part of medleys at the 2009 BET Awards as well as the 2009 Soul Train Music Awards.

== Remixes ==
Several remixes for the song were released. Busta Rhymes is featured on one remix, to which BET Sound Off preferred to the original version, commenting, "Not that I don’t appreciate Keri and Weezy’s version because it’s actually a snazzy lil ditty, but Busta’s ambiance over Polow’s sound scape gives me a different vibe, that 'stand on your desk and mean mug everyone in your office who tells you to turn down your music' vibe." In January 2010, a remix featuring T.I. was released. A MSTRKRFT remix of the original version was released on iTunes.

=== Diss controversy ===
On March 3, 2009, a remix version of the song, entitled "Turnin' Me Off", featuring new verses from Hilson and Lil Wayne, and an additional verse by T-Pain, surfaced online. In the remix, Hilson takes jabs at two unnamed female entertainers. Referred to as "the remix heard round the industry", media rumored that Hilson was taking shots at Beyoncé and Ciara, with lines like "You can dance, she can sing but need to move it to the left", possibly referencing Ciara's acclaimed dancing ability, and Beyoncé's hit "Irreplaceable." The lyrics also point at other possible shots taken toward the artists, such as Hilson stating one needs to "go sit down and have babies" and points out several songs written for the other. A BET columnist wrote, "critics couldn't fathom the purpose or reasoning behind the malicious gesture", while a writer for BET Sound Off noted that if Hilson or her management intended to engage in this, that it would be "career suicide." However, in an interview with Hard Knock TV, Hilson denied the claims that the remix was directed at dissing Knowles or Ciara. According to Hilson, Polow da Don gave her the idea to do a "fiery" record. Although she said she was not retracting anything in the song, calling her response a "blanket statement" she said she was not going to feel some sort of way about how other people interpret, and that blatantly dissing anyone was not the energy behind the record. Hilson commented she wanted to address the haters, and all the media speculation about the remarks was something they did not intend to accomplish with the song. She also addressed that the release of the song was not an intentional leak, stating most remixes are meant to be done when a record is hot, and although admitting that while "Turnin Me On" was not "a number one record", the remix was done three months prior.

While calling into WVEE during their interview with Ciara and Polow da Don, Hilson said,

"I just want to tell Ciara it’s not about you. People are just reading way too far into it. People take things and make it what they want it to be. It wasn’t taking shots at nobody." [sic] I just want to let Atlanta know and Ciara know that this is a true leak. I did, and I don't know if Polow said this on the radio, but I did fight this coming out. I didn't want this coming out because we played it for people when I did it and that's what people said it was about; they started throwing out names. We were like 'No, it's not about that' and we tried to let them know what it was really about. But the fact that people brought back names, it was like ok, that wasn't the reaction we need, so I told Polow, 'let's not do this and he agreed".

Ciara happened to call in during the time period and said she was happy of where Hilson was at in her career, to which Hilson responded the same, saying how proud she was, and "watching her from ground zero." Hilson went on to state she was not jealous of anyone's career, noting how all female R&B artists are the same, pointing out that "Keyshia’s on my album. I’ve worked with Ciara many times. I’m a fan of Beyoncé’s." When asked exactly who the song is about, Hilson said the targets knew who they were, responding, "It's anybody that ever tried to take me down and didn't want to see me succeed. I’m not gonna call their names because I feel I’ve addressed it." She further clarified, commenting "I will say this, my journey has been 12 years long and there have been many people, specifically girls, and it really just isn't one person, it's been a lot of people."

Rumors circulated once again when Ciara released a viral video "Basic Instinct (U Got Me)" to kick off promotion for her album of the same name. Ciara addressed claims that remarks in the song were referring to Hilson in an interview with Rap-Up, stating that the song was dedicated to her haters, gave her a chance to express herself, and was about trusting her first instinct on everything.

In April 2025, when Hilson returned to the public eye to promote her then-upcoming album We Need to Talk, she addressed the controversy; she said,

"Polow da Don had another writer in our camp at the time Ester Dean … he had her write this. He played it for me — meanwhile I'm thinking I was coming in to write a remix to "Turnin' Me On". Automatically, I was like, "I'm not saying that." That was my position. I'm an athlete. I am competitive. But I'm not nasty, I'm a finesse player. I don't look at things like that [...] My album wasn't out yet, I was told it's not coming out if you don't do this [...] I was super young. I felt I had no choice. I'm still protecting everyone involved. I've been eating that for years".

== Track listing ==
- Digital download
1. "Turnin Me On" (feat. Lil Wayne) – 4:08 [Clean or Explicit]
- Digital download – MSTRKRFT Remix
1. "Turnin Me On" (feat. Lil Wayne) – 4:04 [Explicit]

== Personnel ==
Credits lifted from the liner notes of In a Perfect World....

- Songwriting – Keri Hilson, Dwayne Carter, Jamal Jones, Zachary Anson Wallace
- Production – Polow da Don, Danja (additional)
- Vocal arrangement and production – Keri Hilson
- Recording – Tony Terrebonne, Marcella Araica, Jason Schweitzer
- Mixing – Marcella Araica

== Charts ==
=== Weekly charts ===
Weekly chart performance for "Turnin Me On"
Chart (2009)	Peak position
Canada Hot 100 (Billboard)	80
Canada CHR/Top 40 (Billboard)	35
New Zealand (Recorded Music NZ)	29
Slovakia Airplay (ČNS IFPI)	82
US Billboard Hot 100	15
US Hot R&B/Hip-Hop Songs (Billboard)	2
US Pop Airplay (Billboard)	25
US Rhythmic Airplay (Billboard)	4

=== Year-end charts ===
Year-end chart performance for "Turnin Me On"
Chart (2009)	Position
Hungary (Rádiós Top 40)	134
US Billboard Hot 100	49
US Hot R&B/Hip-Hop Songs (Billboard)	7
US Rhythmic (Billboard)	17

== Certifications ==
Certifications for "Turnin Me On"
Region	Certification	Certified units/sales
United States (RIAA)	Platinum	1,000,000^{^}
^{^} Shipments figures based on certification alone.

== Release history ==
Release dates and formats for "Energy"
Region	Date	Format(s)	Label	Ref.
United States	December 2, 2008	Urban airplay	Mosley; Zone 4	
United States	December 9, 2008	Rhythmic airplay	Mosley; Zone 4	
United States	December 9, 2008	Digital download	Mosley; Zone 4	
United States	February 10, 2009	Mainstream airplay	Mosley; Zone 4	
Brazil	May 15, 2009	Digital download	Mosley; Zone 4	
