= Marcella Araica =

American recording and mixing engineer

- Also known as: Ms. Lago; The Incredible Lago
- Born: Marcella Christina Araica
- Genres: Pop; hip-hop; R&B; electronic; urban pop
- Occupations: Mixing engineer; recording engineer; record producer
- Years active: 2002–present
- Labels: N.A.R.S; Mosley Music Group
- Website: www.marcellaaraica.com

Marcella Christina Araica is an American recording and mixing engineer, who has recorded and mixed tracks for artists including Madonna, Britney Spears, P!nk, Duran Duran, K. Michelle, Ciara, Keri Hilson, and Timbaland.

== Biography ==
Araica started her professional career as an assistant at Hit Factory Criteria in March 2002 after graduating from the Full Sail Production and Recording Program in Florida. She was mentored by Jimmy Douglass and Demacio Castellon. Araica describes how it was difficult breaking into a male-dominated career, "As a female, I had more to prove." She has worked as an assistant engineer in sessions for Timbaland and Missy Elliott. Subsequently, she became a full-time engineer at the studio, working closely with Timbaland.

In the early 2000s, she met Danja and the two started working together. In 2008, they co-founded the N.A.R.S. (New Age Rock Stars) record label and in June 2014 opened a recording studio north of Miami in Hallandale, Florida, called Dream Asylum Studios. The studio was built in a former warehouse and has separate recording rooms for Danja and Araica.

She visits Full Sail University often to spread her knowledge and give current students a closer look into what it really takes to become successful in the music industry. Araica also created the Red Bottoms Foundation in order to support women in the music industry. The foundation supports mentorships for women.

Araica's method of working with musical projects is to focus primarily on the vocal aspect of the song, and then uses effects in Pro Tools and outboard gear. She has also called herself "a mad scientist when I'm in the studio."

=== Credits ===
Araica's mixing and recording credits include "Gimme More" by Britney Spears, "The Way I Are" by Timbaland, "Migrate" by Mariah Carey, "We Takin' Over" by DJ Khaled, "When I’m Gone" by Simple Plan and "The Valley" by Duran Duran.

== Selected discography ==
Name Variations: Marcella Araica, Marcella 'Ms. Lago' Araica', The Incredible Lago

=== Mix ===
- "Special Occasion"
- "Bad Girl"
- "Day26"
- "E=MC²"
- "Welcome to the Dollhouse"
- "In a Perfect World…"
- "Hide The Rum"
- "Blackout"

=== Appears on ===
- "The Valley"
- After the Storm by Monica (2003)
- "Pass That Dutch" / "Hurt Sumthin"
- "I'm Really Hot"
- "Monkey Business"
- "Maneater"
- "Relax And Take Notes" / "Turn Up The Bump"
- "The Big Bang"
- "Anonymous"
- "Gimme More"
- "Trey Day"
- "When I'm Gone"
- "Break The Ice"
- "Circus"
- "Overworld"
- "Simple Plan"
- "Turntables" (Ciara Song)
- "Freak"
- "Perfect Lover"
- "Hot As Ice"

== Awards ==
In 2010, Araica received two ASCAP awards for "Knock You Down" and "Sober." She was presented with the Leading Ladies of Entertainment accolade by the Latin Recording Academy in 2017.

== Bibliography ==
- Mshaka, Thembisa S. (2009). Put Your Dreams First: Handle Your Entertainment Business. Business Plus. ISBN 978-0-446-40946-9.
