= Knock You Down =

2009 single by Keri Hilson featuring Kanye West and Ne-Yo

Single by Keri Hilson featuring Kanye West and Ne-Yo

from the album In a Perfect World...
- Released: April 7, 2009
- Recorded: 2009
- Studio: Hit Factory Criteria (Miami); Circle House (Miami); No Excuses Santa Monica); Threshold (Santa Monica); Chung King (New York City)
- Genre: R&B; hip hop
- Length: 5:26 (album version); 4:12 (radio edit)
- Label: Mosley; Zone 4; Interscope
- Songwriters: Nate Hills; Keri Hilson; Kevin Cossom; Shaffer Smith; Marcella Araica; Kanye West
- Producers: Danja; Hilson

Keri Hilson singles chronology
"Turnin Me On" (2009)	"Knock You Down" (2009)	"Make Love" (2009)

Kanye West singles chronology
"Paranoid" (2009)	"Knock You Down" (2009)	"Kinda Like a Big Deal" (2009)

Ne-Yo singles chronology
"Mad" (2009)	"Knock You Down" (2009)	"Part of the List" (2009)

Music video
- "Keri Hilson - Knock You Down (Official Music Video) ft. Kanye West, Ne-Yo" on YouTube

"Knock You Down" is a song by American singer and songwriter Keri Hilson, recorded for her debut album, In a Perfect World.... The song features guest vocals from Ne-Yo and Kanye West. All three artists co-wrote the song with its producer Nate "Danja" Hills, as well as Kevin Cossom and Marcella Araica. The song was released first to rhythmic and urban airplay in the United States as the album's fourth single in the US, and it would later serve as the third worldwide single.

The song is an R&B and hip hop song, which includes elements of pop music. The lyrics of the song pertain to how love "knocks you down." Part of the song refers to Michael Jackson; coincidentally it was released at the time surrounding the death of the singer. The song received generally mixed to positive reviews, with critics divided as to whether Ne-Yo and West overwhelmed Hilson's appearance. However, reviewers also complimented that the song was radio-friendly. It was nominated for multiple awards, including Best Rap/Sung Collaboration at the 52nd Grammy Awards.

"Knock You Down" peaked at number one in New Zealand, and was certified quadruple platinum by Recorded Music NZ. It also reached the top ten in Canada, Ireland, the United Kingdom, and the United States. The song's music video was directed by Chris Robinson. It sees Hilson caught in a love triangle with her former partner West, and new-found love Ne-Yo. The video received positive reviews, which appreciated the given performances given by the artists. Hilson performed the song a number of times, including television appearances such as on The Rachael Ray Show. She also notably performed the song at the 2009 BET Awards, where she used the Jackson reference of the song to give a tribute performance to the late singer.

== Background ==
Hilson and Ne-Yo knew each other from their days as co-songwriters. Hilson had appeared as Ne-Yo's love interest in the video for his song "Miss Independent" (referenced in the song), the second single taken from his 2008 album, Year of the Gentleman. In a September 2008 interview with Rap-Up about a recent crop of songwriters becoming singers, Ne-Yo said "For one, I think Keri Hilson’s too freakin’ pretty to be in the background. For two, her voice is incredible—on top of the fact that she can write. So I think that she's definitely one that deserves the spotlight." In "Knock You Down", Kanye West makes multiple references to Michael Jackson, and coincidentally, the song was released in numerous territories around the death of the singer.

== Composition ==
"Knock You Down"
A sample of the chorus of "Knock You Down", which is said to be in a "frenetic midtempo groove"

"Knock You Down" is a R&B song with a length of five minutes and twenty six seconds. The song also includes electro tones, and derives from pop and hip hop genres. The song is set in common time, and composed in a "moderate R&B groove." It is written in the key of G minor, and vocals span from F_{3} to D_{5}. It follows the chord progression E♭–F–B♭–E♭–F–Gm. The song begins with a rap intro by Kanye West, accompanied by a "stabbing synth riff." According to Chris Williams of Billboard, The verses contain a "thumping bass-beat" while the chorus is in a "frenetic midtempo groove." Dan Nishimoto of Prefix Magazine said the song had a "4/4 Motown feel on the verses and stuttering drums on the chorus." Hilson performs the first verse and chorus, while Ne-Yo sings the second verse. West then has a rap interlude before Hilson sings an additional part before the song ends with the chorus by Hilson, accompanied by Ne-Yo. In West's lines, he references Michael Jackson and his song "Bad" in the lines "This is bad, real bad, Michael Jackson." Coincidentally, the song was released in numerous territories around the death of the singer. West also refers to the domestic abuse accusations against Jackson's father, Joe, in the following lyric "Now mad, real mad, Joe Jackson." Lyrically, the song is about how a great love goes wrong.

== Critical reception ==
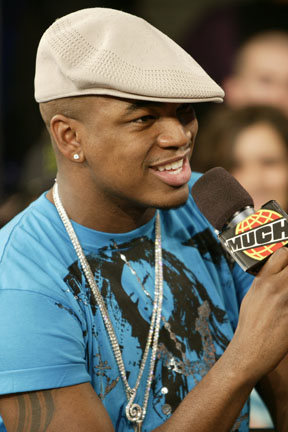
Critics were divided as to whether the song's features overwhelmed Hilson. Nick Levine said that Ne-Yo (pictured) had a more "distinctive" voice than Hilson

Chris Williams of Billboard said "with a vocal assist from Ne-Yo and a clever guest rap by Kanye West, it appears Hilson is intent on a knockout punch of her own." Dan Nishimoto of Prefix Magazine said the song was one of the better radio-friendly tracks on the album. Melinda Newman of HitFix said that "the mid-tempo track is undeniably catchy and will embed itself within your brain after only a few listens." Sophie Bruce of BBC Music positively received the song, calling it the album's "biggest potential hit." Although Nick Levine of Digital Spy gave the song three out of five stars, complimenting production by Danja, and saying that the song sounded like a more obvious hit than "Return the Favor", he complained that "getting two R&B A-listers to appear on your track should be a real coup, but not when one's got a more distinctive voice than you and the other steals the show with some typically ballsy rapping." Quentin B. Huff of PopMatters criticized the repetitive hook, stating "Hook-wise, it’s a little like listening to an album of kids chanting while playing double-dutch." He also said that Hilson's vocals "show promise but fail to distinguish the Hilson brand from the crowd."

"Knock You Down" was nominated for three awards. At the 2009 Soul Train Music Awards, the song was nominated for Record of the Year (Songwriters Award) as well as Best Collaboration. At the 52nd Grammy Awards, it was nominated for Best Rap/Sung Collaboration, but lost to Jay-Z's "Run This Town", another song in which West is featured. Entertainment Weekly named "Knock You Down" the fourth best song of 2009. Slant Magazine listed it the 19th on its list of the best songs of 2009.

== Chart performance ==
"Knock You Down" debuted on the Billboard Hot 100 at number sixty-five, and would later go on to peak at number three. Along with "The Way I Are", it was Hilson's highest-charting single on the Hot 100. It also achieved successes in other Billboard component charts, topping the Hot R&B/Hip-Hop Songs, and reaching number three on the Pop Songs chart. "Knock You Down" became Hilson's biggest airplay single to date, topping the Hot 100 Airplay for four consecutive weeks. It has sold over 2,100,000 digital copies as of April 2011. "Knock You Down" spent a total of thirty-one weeks on the Hot 100. The single appeared on numerous charts internationally. On the Canadian Hot 100, and the Australian Singles Chart the song peaked at number three. It debuted at number forty on the UK Singles Chart, and five weeks later, it reached number five, where it remained for two weeks. In Ireland, it peaked at number two on the Irish Singles Chart, while it reached number eight on the Dutch Top 40. The song performed best on the New Zealand Singles Chart, where it reached number one, and was eventually certified quadruple platinum by Recorded Music NZ (RMNZ). "Knock You Down" charted in the top twenty of Norway, Sweden, and Slovakia, the top thirty of Germany, Belgium (Wallonia), and Denmark, and in the top forty of the Czech Republic. It reached number forty-nine on the Belgian Singles Chart in Flanders. its success in Europe allowed it to chart at number thirteen on the European Hot 100.

== Music video ==
A flashback of West and Hilson's prior relationship is shown during their confrontation in the music video.

The music video for "Knock You Down", directed by Chris Robinson, premiered on March 12, 2009. The video begins with Hilson slowly falling backwards onto a bed, and then West appears and raps the introduction. Both start reflecting on their previous relationship, before the clip flashes back to the previous events. West is shown to be an artist, who is painting a portrait of Hilson. Hilson and West begin to caress each other, as she is shown in several seductive poses in a bed and sings in front of a white backdrop. The video returns to the present, showing Hilson and West breaking up, as both of them fall backwards onto the floor, similar to the way Hilson falls onto the bed in the opening sequence. Visual effects come into play greater in this scene, as when West falls, he shatters into pieces. Ne-Yo then appears, and sings his lines in front of a grey backdrop. Ne-Yo and Hilson proceed to go on a date at a party in West and Hilson's apartment, and are seen being affectionate by West. He then confronts Hilson, and Ne-Yo also approaches the duo before Hilson walks off, torn between the two men. The clip ends with Hilson falling backwards onto a bed, in similar fashion as the opening scene.

Melinda Newman of HitFix positively received the video, stating "its success lies solely in the charisma and believability that the trio brings to the small screen, which is considerable." A writer for BET Sound Off called the video a "tantalizing visual" and said he adored it, commenting, "sans Kanye and Neyo’s unbearable showdown, I could watch this video over and over and over and over!" Margeaux Watson of Entertainment Weekly said, "Though their scenes together are G-rated in comparison to Ciara's steamy romp with Justin Timberlake in their new clip for 'Love Sex Magic,' Hilson’s solo shots in bed are undeniably hot. Indeed, a tasteful flash of booty never hurt nobody." In an interview on the Today Show, anchor Hoda Kotb made a remark to Ne-Yo, stating, "You have this really hot new video that you do with Kanye West and another woman named Keri. You [and Kanye] are such big stars. How did this happen?" Blogs reported this as a possible "diss" toward Hilson, however, neither camps reported anything after the fact.

== Live performances ==
Hilson performed the song for Walmart Soundcheck to promote the album. She also performed the song while being a supporting act to Ne-Yo, on his Year of the Gentleman tour in 2009. Hilson and West performed the song on May 5, 2009, on the Late Show with David Letterman. Hilson also performed the song, along with a cover of Gnarls Barkley's "Crazy" on July 21, 2009, for Yahoo! Music sponsored by Pepsi. She performed the song with "Turnin Me On" at the 2009 BET Awards in June 2009. She used the Michael Jackson reference in the song to perform a dance routine paying homage to Jackson, at the awards ceremony. On July 28, 2009, Hilson performed the song on It's On with Alexa Chung. Hilson performed the song and "Energy" with British singer-songwriter Taio Cruz at the MOBO Awards 2009, which she co-hosted, on October 4, 2009. On January 1, 2010, she performed the song as a part of her set list of Dick Clark's New Year's Rockin' Eve with Ryan Seacrest. On January 29, 2010, Hilson performed an acoustic rendition of the song on The Rachael Ray Show. On February 5, 2010, she performed the song at BET's SOS: Help for Haiti Telethon, to benefit the victims of the 2010 Haitian earthquake. On October 22, 2010, she performed the song in Chicago at Collins Academy High School during the Get Schooled National Challenge and Tour.

== Track listing ==
Digital download remix bundle

1. "Knock You Down" (Electrolitz Remix) [feat. Rye Rye] – 4:55
2. "Knock You Down" (Moto Blanco Club Remix Extended) – 8:59
3. "Knock You Down" (Moto Blanco Club Remix) – 5:54
4. "Knock You Down" (Moto Blanco Dub Remix) – 7:44
5. "Knock You Down" (Random Soul Synthetic Remix) – 7:52
6. "Knock You Down" (Bimbo Jones Club Remix) – 7:41
7. "Knock You Down" (Bimbo Jones Dub Remix) – 7:41
8. "Knock You Down" (Bimbo Jones Radio Remix) – 4:28

Europe CD single

1. "Knock You Down" (Radio edit) – 4:12
2. "Knock You Down" (Radio edit instrumental) – 4:12

== Credits ==
Credits adapted from the In the Perfect World... liner notes.

- Nathaniel "Danja" Hills – writer, record producer
- Keri Hilson – writer, vocals, vocal producer
- Kevin Cossom – writer
- Shaffer "Ne-Yo" Smith – writer, vocals
- Marcella Araica – writer, recording engineer, audio mixer
- Kanye West – writer, vocals
- Josh Mosser – recording engineer
- Bryan Jones – recording engineer
- Ben Reid – recording engineer
- Anthony Palazolle – recording engineer
- Jared Newcomb – audio mixing assistant

== Charts ==
=== Weekly charts ===
Weekly chart performance for "Knock You Down"
Chart (2009)	Peak position
Australia (ARIA)	24
Austria (Ö3 Austria Top 40)	37
Belgium (Ultratop 50 Flanders)	49
Belgium (Ultratop 50 Wallonia)	29
Canada Hot 100 (Billboard)	9
Canada CHR/Top 40 (Billboard)	2
Canada Hot AC (Billboard)	12
CIS Airplay (TopHit)	147
Czech Republic Airplay (ČNS IFPI)	31
Denmark (Tracklisten)	28
Europe (European Hot 100 Singles)	13
France Airplay (SNEP)	40
Germany (GfK)	30
Ireland (IRMA)	2
Mexico Ingles Airplay (Billboard)	48
Netherlands (Dutch Top 40)	8
Netherlands (Single Top 100)	24
New Zealand (Recorded Music NZ)	1
Norway (VG-lista)	11
Scottish Singles Sales (Official Charts)	6
Slovakia Airplay (ČNS IFPI)	16
Sweden (Sverigetopplistan)	11
UK Singles (Official Charts)	5
UK Hip Hop/R&B (Official Charts)	2
US Billboard Hot 100	3
US Adult Pop Airplay (Billboard)	34
US Hot R&B/Hip-Hop Songs (Billboard)	1
US Pop Airplay (Billboard)	3
US Rhythmic Airplay (Billboard)	1

=== Monthly charts ===
Monthly chart performance for "Knock You Down"
Chart (2009)	Peak position
Brazil (Brasil Hot 100 Airplay)	93

=== Year-end charts ===
Year-end chart performance for "Knock You Down"
Chart (2009)	Peak position
Australia Urban (ARIA)	28
Canada (Canadian Hot 100)	41
Japan Adult Contemporary (Billboard)	31
Netherlands (Dutch Top 40)	52
New Zealand (RIANZ)	10
Sweden (Sverigetopplistan)	45
UK Singles (OCC)	41
US Billboard Hot 100	15
US Hot R&B/Hip-Hop Songs (Billboard)	11
US Mainstream Top 40 (Billboard)	21
US Rhythmic (Billboard)	3

== Certifications ==
Certifications for "Knock You Down"
Region	Certification	Certified units/sales
Australia (ARIA)	Gold	35,000^{^}
Brazil (Pro-Música Brasil)	Gold	30,000^{‡}
Denmark (IFPI Danmark)	Gold	45,000^{‡}
New Zealand (RMNZ)	4× Platinum	120,000^{‡}
United Kingdom (BPI)	2× Platinum	1,200,000^{‡}
United States (RIAA)	2× Platinum	2,000,000^{*}
^{*} Sales figures based on certification alone.^{^} Shipments figures based on certification alone.^{‡} Sales+streaming figures based on certification alone.

== Release history ==
Release dates and formats for "Knock You Down"
Region	Date	Format(s)	Ref.
United States	April 7, 2009	Rhythmic and urban airplay	
United States	April 14, 2009	Mainstream airplay	
United Kingdom	May 4, 2009	Digital download	
United Kingdom	June 22, 2009	CD single	
Brazil	September 9, 2009	Digital download	

== Covers and parodies ==
- Rucka Rucka Ali made a parody of "Knock You Down" called "Crips & Bloods".
