= Danja (music producer) =

American record producer (born 1982)

- Born: Floyd Nathaniel Hills; February 22, 1982 (age 44); Virginia Beach, Virginia, U.S.
- Occupations: Record producer; songwriter
- Instrument: Keyboards
- Years active: 1998–present
- Labels: N.A.R.S; Mosley; Realm
- Website: realmwrld.com

Floyd Nathaniel Hills (born February 22, 1982), known professionally as Danja (/ˈdeɪndʒə/; dayn-juh), is an American record producer from Virginia Beach, Virginia. Beginning his career as a co-producer for fellow Virginian Timbaland, he has since produced for Lloyd Banks, Britney Spears, Dua Lipa, Usher, Keri Hilson, T.I., Nelly Furtado, Ciara, Mariah Carey, Madonna, Whitney Houston, Missy Elliott, M.I.A., Justin Timberlake, JoJo, Joe Jonas, Simple Plan, the Clutch, Pink, T-Pain, Diddy, Meek Mill, Björk, Duran Duran and Agnez Mo.

== Early life ==
Hills was born in Virginia Beach, Virginia. He took up the drums and piano in his early teens. He got his start by playing in his church when he was growing up.

== Career ==
In 2000, Danja worked with producer Teddy Riley on Blackstreet's fourth album, Level II. In 2001, a chance encounter with Timbaland turned into an opportunity to play some music for him. Two years later, Timbaland brought Danja to Miami to work in his studio.

With Timbaland, Hills produced a wide catalog of songs in 2006 including "Put You on The Game" by the Game, "Promiscuous" and "Say It Right" by Nelly Furtado, "SexyBack", "What Goes Around... Comes Around" and "My Love" by Justin Timberlake. In the subsequent years, he produced "Love Story" by Katharine McPhee, "Innocence" and "Earth Intruders" by Björk, and "Give It to Me" and "The Way I Are" off Timbaland's second solo album.

In 2007, Danja produced "Gimme More" for Britney Spears, as well as "Break the Ice" and five other tracks for her album Blackout. The following year, he produced "Kill the Lights" and other songs for her following album, Circus. Danja produced several tracks with Timbaland and Justin Timberlake for Madonna's 2008 album Hard Candy, including its lead single "4 Minutes". He also produced Mariah Carey's "Migrate" from E=MC², Keri Hilson's "Knock You Down" from In a Perfect World..., and Pink's "Sober" from Funhouse.

Danja produced the song "Toy Soldier" on Keri Hilson's second album No Boys Allowed (2010), "Freak" by Jamie Foxx, "The Writer" by Jesse McCartney, and "Sleep When I'm Gone" by DJ Khaled on the album We the Best Forever (2011). In 2010, Danja produced three songs on Diddy – Dirty Money's album Last Train to Paris and "Everything on Me" on T.I.'s album No Mercy. Danja produced several singles for the recording career of songwriting collaborator Kevin Cossom, including his debut "Baby I Like It" featuring Fabolous and Diddy. For Travis Garland, he produced "Believe", "Don't Leave Me Rose", and "Killer". Danja has also produced "Sexy to Me" by JoJo, which is also featured on the singer's commercial for Clearasil. According to Danja's Twitter account, he was in studio with Mary J. Blige and Jay-Z.

Danja met Marcella Araica in the early 2000s and the two began working together. In 2008, they co-founded the N.A.R.S. (New Age Rock Stars) record label and in June 2014 opened a recording studio north of Miami in Hallandale, Florida, called Dream Asylum Studios.

== Awards and nominations ==
=== Grammy Awards ===
Year	Category	Work	Original artist(s)	Result	Ref.
2007	Album of the Year	FutureSex/LoveSounds	Justin Timberlake	Nominated	
2007	Best Dance Recording	"SexyBack"	Justin Timberlake	Won	
2008	Record of the Year	"What Goes Around... Comes Around"	Justin Timberlake	Nominated	
2008	Best Dance Recording	"LoveStoned/I Think She Knows"	Justin Timberlake	Won	
2008	Best Rap Song	"Ayo Technology"	50 Cent featuring Justin Timberlake	Nominated	

=== Other Awards ===
Awards and nominations for Blackout by Britney Spears
Year	Award	Category	Nominee(s)	Result	Ref.
2008	NRJ Music Award	International Album of the Year	Blackout	Won	
2008	MTV Europe Music Award	Best Album	Blackout	Won	
