= I Like (Keri Hilson song) =

2009 single by Keri Hilson

Single by Keri Hilson

from the album Zweiohrküken and In a Perfect World... (I Like Edition)
- Released: December 11, 2009
- Genre: Electropop
- Length: 3:38
- Label: Interscope
- Songwriters: Robin Grubert; David Jost
- Producers: David Jost; Robin Grubert

Keri Hilson singles chronology
"Medicine" (2009)	"I Like" (2009)	"Million Dollar Girl" (2010)

Music video
- Keri Hilson - "I Like" (Official Music Video) on YouTube

"I Like" is a song by American singer Keri Hilson. It was written and produced by German musicians David Jost and Robin Grubert and recorded by Hilson for the soundtrack for the German film Zweiohrküken (2009). The track was later also featured on a re-released edition of Hilson's 2009 studio album In a Perfect World.... The song debuted at number 1 on the official German Top 100 singles chart and was eventually certified platinum by the Bundesverband Musikindustrie (BVMI). After its success in Germany, the song entered many other charts in mainland Europe.

== Commercial use ==
In April 2010, the song was used in a commercial for the broadcasting of US show 90210 on the UK channel E4.

== Chart performance ==
On December 21, 2009, Media Control announced that "I Like" had debuted at number 1 on the German Singles Chart. To date, it is her most successful single in Germany, peaking at number 1 for three non-consecutive weeks. It was certified platinum by the Bundesverband Musikindustrie (BVMI), selling over 300,000 copies. The single debuted on the UK Singles Chart at number 68 on May 23, 2010, and peaked at number 34.

== Music video ==
The music video for "I Like" was shot in October 2009 by Aaron Platt. It premiered online on November 20, 2009, and shows Hilson dancing in front of different scenes, featuring incorporated clips from the Zweiohrküken film. Later, on December 24, 2009, it premiered another version of the video, the main difference was that the video did not feature incorporated clips from the Zweiohrküken film.

== Track listing ==
All tracks written by Robin Grubert and David Jost.

German CD/digital single
No.	Title	Producer(s)	Length
1.	"I Like" (Jost & Grubert radio mix)	Robin Grubert; David Jost	3:38
2.	"I Like" (Manhattan Clique remix)	Grubert; Jost; Manhattan Clique^{[a]}	6:01

Notes

- ^{^[a]} denotes remix producer(s)

== Charts ==
=== Weekly charts ===
Weekly chart performance for "I Like"
Chart (2009–10)	Peak position
Austria (Ö3 Austria Top 40)	2
Belgium (Ultratop 50 Flanders)	37
Belgium (Ultratip Bubbling Under Wallonia)	20
CIS Airplay (TopHit)	3
Czech Republic Airplay (ČNS IFPI)	9
Denmark (Tracklisten)	30
Europe (European Hot 100 Singles)	9
Germany (GfK)	1
Germany (Official Airplay Chart)	1
Greece (IFPI)	2
Hungary (Editors' Choice Top 40)	23
Luxembourg Digital Songs (Billboard)	1
Norway (VG-lista)	3
Poland Airplay (ZPAV)	1
Poland Dance (ZPAV)	26
Russia Airplay (TopHit)	3
Scotland Singles (OCC)	25
Slovakia Airplay (ČNS IFPI)	1
South Korea International (Circle)	28
Switzerland (Schweizer Hitparade)	5
Sweden (Sverigetopplistan)	46
UK Singles (OCC)	34
UK R&B (OCC)	15

=== Year-end charts ===
2010 year-end chart performance for "I Like"
Chart (2010)	Position
Austria (Ö3 Austria Top 40)	17
Europe (European Hot 100 Singles)	32
Germany (Media Control GfK)[	9
German Airplay Chart	2
Russia Airplay (TopHit)	3
Switzerland (Schweizer Hitparade)	34

2011 year-end chart performance for "I Like"
Chart (2011)	Position
Russia Airplay (TopHit)	126

== Certifications ==
Certifications for "I Like"
Region	Certification	Certified units/sales
Germany (BVMI)	3× Gold	450,000^{‡}
Switzerland (IFPI Switzerland)	Platinum	30,000^{^}
^{^} Shipments figures based on certification alone.^{‡} Sales+streaming figures based on certification alone.

== Release history ==
Release dates and formats for "I Like"
Region	Date	Format(s)	Label	Ref.
Germany	December 11, 2009	CD single; digital download	Interscope	
United Kingdom	May 17, 2010	Digital download	Interscope	

== See also ==
- List of number-one hits of 2009 and 2010 (Germany)
