= The Clutch =

American collective of songwriters

- Origin: Atlanta, Georgia, U.S.
- Genres: R&B, hip hop
- Years active: 2004–2010
- Past members: Candice Nelson; Balewa Muhammad; J. Que; Keri Hilson; Ezekiel Lewis

The Clutch was an American collective of songwriters and record producers based in Atlanta, composed of Candice Clotiel "Gg" Nelson, Ezekiel "Zeke" Lewis, Patrick Michael "J. Que" Smith, Balewa Muhammad and Keri Hilson. They were credited on the Billboard Hot 100-top 40 singles Omarion's "Ice Box", Ciara's "Like a Boy", Timbaland's "The Way I Are", and Justin Bieber's "One Less Lonely Girl".

A combination of two or more of the five writers on a song is considered a track "written by the Clutch" as they rarely worked as a complete fivesome. The Clutch wrote songs themselves, but also did so in tandem with fellow commercially successful producers—including Calvo Da Gr8, Bigg D, Hit-Boy, Timbaland, Danja, Bryan-Michael Cox, Bloodshy & Avant and Tricky Stewart—to create several other hit songs.

In June 2023, Clutch member Ezekiel Lewis was named President of Epic Records. Prior, Lewis had been Vice President and head of A&R at Motown Records from 2011 to 2017 and Vice President of A&R at Epic since 2017.

== Discography ==
=== Singles produced ===
Year	Song	Artist	Chart position			
Year	Song	Artist	R&B	Hot 100	Pop 100	UK
2004	"Things You Never Hear A Girl Say" (Unreleased)	3LW	—	—	—	—
2005	"Take Me as I Am"	Mary J. Blige	3	58	—	—
2006	"4 Minutes"	Avant	9	52	—	—
2007	"Only One U"	Fantasia	36	—	—	—
2007	"Ice Box"	Omarion	5	12	15	14
2007	"Cut Off Time" (feat. Kat DeLuna)	Omarion	^{BU}	^{BU}	^{BU}	^{−}
2007	"Stunnas" / "Season's Change"	Jagged Edge	^{BU}	^{BU}	^{BU}	^{—}
2007	"Anonymous" (feat. Timbaland)	Bobby Valentino	17	49	—	25
2007	"Rearview (Ridin')" (feat. Ludacris)	Bobby Valentino	^{C}	^{C}	^{C}	^{C}
2007	"Forever"	Jennifer Lopez	^{C}	^{C}	^{C}	^{C}
2007	"Like a Boy"	Ciara	6	19	27	16
2007	"That's Right" (feat. Lil' Jon)	Ciara	^{P}	^{P}	^{P}	^{P}
2007	"The Way I Are" (feat. Keri Hilson, D.O.E. & Sebastian)	Timbaland	59	3	27	1
2007	"More Than Words (A E I O U)"	Menudo	^{P}	^{P}	^{P}	^{P}
2007	"Promise Ring" (feat. Ciara)	Tiffany Evans	66	—	—	—
2008	"Keep A Friend"	Raven-Symoné	—	—	—	—
2008	"Radar"	Britney Spears	^{P}	88	67	46
2008	"Pretty Boy"	Danity Kane	—	—	—	—
2008	"Official Girl"	Cassie	—	—	—	—
2008	"Long Gone"	Chris Cornell	^{P}	^{P}	^{P}	^{P}
2008	"It's Over"	Jesse McCartney	—	62	31	—
2008	"Return The Favor" (feat. Timbaland)	Keri Hilson	—	—	—	19
2008	"Part Of Me"	Chris Cornell	—	—	—	18
2008	"Never Far Away"	Chris Cornell	—	—	—	—
2009	"One Less Lonely Girl"	Justin Bieber	—	16	21	10

^{C} Single release canceled

^{P} Promo only or limited release

^{BU} Reached only Billboard's Bubbling Under R&B/Hip-Hop Singles chart
