= Keri Hilson =

American singer (born 1982)

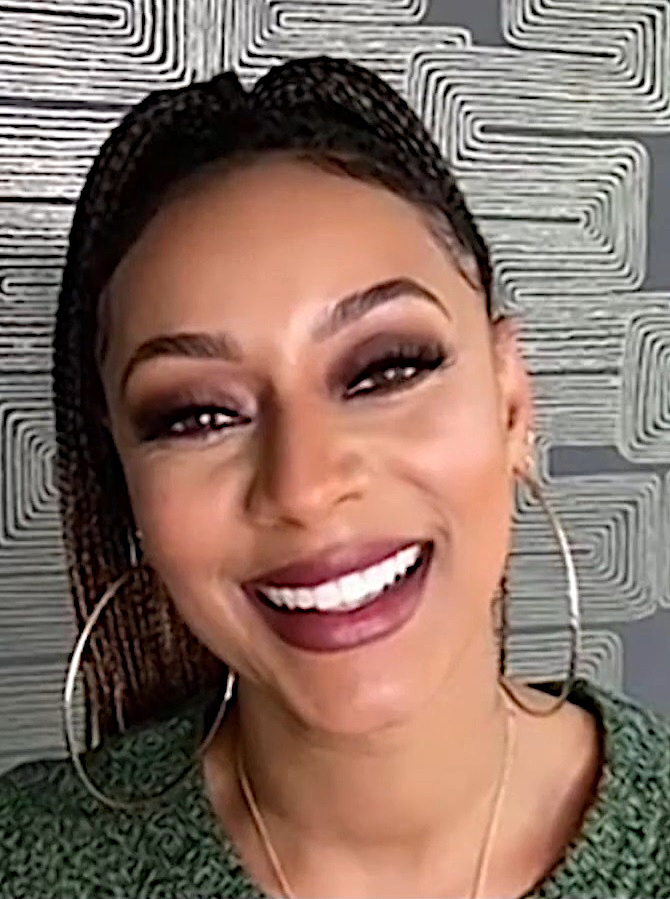
- Hilson in 2022
- Born: Keri Lynn Hilson; December 5, 1982 (age 43); Decatur, Georgia, U.S.
- Occupations: Singer; songwriter; record producer; actress
- Years active: 2002–present
- Works: Discography
- Awards: Full list
- Musical career
- Genre: R&B
- Instrument: Vocals
- Labels: Mosley; Zone 4; Interscope
- Formerly of: The Clutch
- Producer(s): Anthony Dent; Polow da Don; Timbaland
- Website: kerihilson.com

Keri Lynn Hilson (born December 5, 1982) is an American singer-songwriter and actress. Born and raised in Decatur, Georgia, she began her musical career as a songwriter and backing vocalist for other artists under the wing of producer Anthony Dent in 2002. At the age of 14, Hilson secured a record deal with the girl group D'Signe, who disbanded without any releases. She attended Oxford College of Emory University while contributing to material for popular artists, including Britney Spears, Usher, Ciara, the Pussycat Dolls, and Mary J. Blige; she joined the songwriting-production group the Clutch in 2004.

Later that same year, she guest performed on the single "Hey Now (Mean Muggin)" by Xzibit, which marked her first entry on the Billboard Hot 100. Two years later, she signed with producers Polow da Don and Timbaland through their respective labels Zone 4 and Mosley Music Group—both imprints of Interscope Records—to further pursue a recording career. She guest appeared on Timbaland's 2007 single, "The Way I Are", which peaked at number three on the Billboard Hot 100 and peaked atop record charts in eight other countries, becoming her mainstream commercial breakthrough.

Her 2008 debut single, "Energy", and its follow-ups "Return the Favor" (featuring Timbaland) and "Turnin Me On" (featuring Lil Wayne) each preceded the release of her debut studio album, In a Perfect World... (2009). Along with positive critical response, the album peaked at number four on the US Billboard 200 and received gold certification by the Recording Industry Association of America (RIAA). It also spawned the single "Knock You Down" (featuring Kanye West and Ne-Yo), which was nominated for Best Rap/Sung Collaboration at the 52nd Annual Grammy Awards and matched "The Way I Are" as her highest-charting song. Her second studio album, No Boys Allowed (2010) was met with mixed reviews and a commercial decline from its predecessor, but spawned the platinum-certified single "Pretty Girl Rock" (remixed featuring Kanye West). After a 14 year hiatus, she self-released her 2025 single "Bae", which preceded her third studio album, We Need to Talk (2025).

Hilson's musical style is R&B, hip-hop, and pop; womanhood, intimacy, romance, and independence has been her frequent subject matter. She has pursued a side career in acting, making her film debut in the Tim Story romantic comedy film Think Like a Man. In charitable endeavors, she has contributed in the fight against HIV and AIDS, supported various relief efforts for natural disasters, and has been involved with several educational organizations. Her accolades include two Grammy Award nominations (including Best New Artist), a BET Award, a MOBO Award, an NAACP Image Award, and two Soul Train Music Awards.

== Life and career ==
=== 1982–2007: Early life and career beginnings ===
Keri Lynn Hilson was born on December 5, 1982, in Decatur, Georgia. Hilson's mother owned and ran a day care center and her father was a developer who served in the Army. She was raised in a middle class family and in an African-American neighborhood. Her brother is Kip and her sisters are Kelsee, Kye and Kaycee. Hilson and her siblings did not attend a school within the neighborhood, stating that "they shipped us off for an hour to get to school every day. It was just that important for us to maintain the life that they had created". From the age of 12, Hilson wanted to pursue a musical career, after watching television talent shows, Star Search and Showtime at the Apollo. Her mother then hired a piano teacher to give her piano lessons; however, Hilson wanted to become a singer and therefore "converted those sessions into vocal lessons, accompanying the teacher on piano". Her father was a whistler and a fan of the band Sade, a skill passed down to Hilson. By the age of 14, Hilson had secured a record deal with the girl group D'Signe, who later disbanded.

Hilson's first credit as a songwriter was the song "Jump", performed by Japanese R&B singer Michico for the latter's debut album, I Do (2002). Hilson spent most of her teenage years working with producer Anthony Dent as a songwriter and background vocalist for the likes of Usher, Ludacris, Kelly Rowland, Toni Braxton, Ciara and Polow da Don. After graduating from Tucker High School in the DeKalb County School District, Hilson attended Oxford College of Emory University and Emory University in Atlanta for three years and studied a course in theater. She continued working as a songwriter and background vocalist during her schooling years. Hilson eventually stopped working with Dent in favor of Polow da Don. She also became a member of the songwriting and production team, The Clutch. Together, they wrote Mary J. Blige's "Take Me as I Am" (2006), Omarion's "Ice Box" (2006), Ciara's "Like a Boy" (2006), The Pussycat Dolls' "Wait a Minute" (2006) and Britney Spears' "Gimme More" (2007). In 2006, Polow introduced Hilson to American rapper and producer Timbaland, who then signed her to his record label, Mosley Music Group. In October 2006, Hilson made her recording debut on American rapper P. Diddy's song "After Love" — produced by Timbaland and included on his third album Press Play. She also appeared on American rapper Lloyd Banks' single "Help" from his album Rotten Apple, released the following month.

The following year, Hilson was featured on three singles; in June, on Timbaland's song "The Way I Are", the second single from his album Shock Value (2007); on Rich Boy's "Good Things" with Polow da Don; and thereafter, in December, on Timbaland's song "Scream" with Nicole Scherzinger, the fifth single from Shock Value. The former peaked at number three on the Billboard Hot 100 — her first entry on the chart — while peaking atop nine international charts.

=== 2008–2009: In a Perfect World... ===
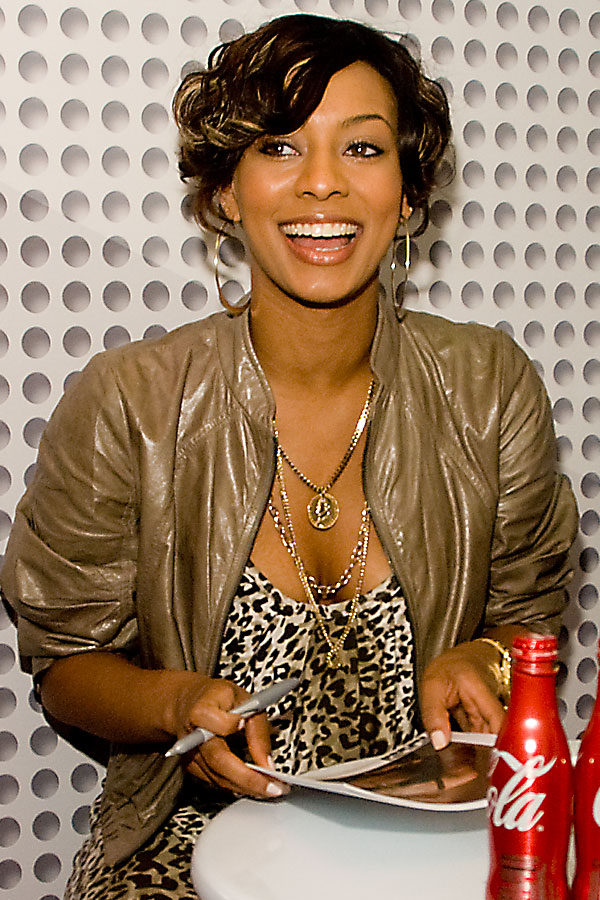
Hilson in 2009

In 2008, Hilson appeared in the music videos for Usher's single "Love in This Club" and Ne-Yo's single "Miss Independent". Her debut studio album, In a Perfect World..., was released on March 24, 2009. The album contained pop-oriented R&B songs. It was initially planned to be released the previous year; however, the album was delayed several times because Hilson wanted to make sure it came out to her liking, stating "I'm just a perfectionist. I have had many [release dates], but it's all for a good cause. The label wants to make sure the album has its proper release, and I'm thankful for that. Very grateful, even though fans look at it like it's a bad thing." In the United States, In a Perfect World... debuted at number four on the Billboard 200 chart, and number one on the Top R&B/Hip-Hop Albums chart, with first-week sales of 94,000 copies. By October 2009, the album was certified gold by the Recording Industry Association of America (RIAA). Its first single, "Energy", released in May 2008, peaked at number 78 on the US Billboard Hot 100 chart and number 21 on the US Hot R&B/Hip-Hop Songs chart. It reached the top 50 in the United Kingdom, and peaked the highest in New Zealand at number two, and was certified gold in that country. Hilson also featured on three singles in 2008; in June, on rapper Nas' song "Hero"; in September, on Kardinal Offishall's "Numba 1 (Tide Is High)"; and thereafter, in October, on Chris Brown's song "Superhuman".

"Return the Favor", featuring Timbaland, served as the second international single from Hilson's In a Perfect World... album, while "Turnin Me On" featuring Lil Wayne, was released as the second US single. The latter achieved commercial success, reaching number 15 on the Billboard Hot 100, and number two on the Hot R&B/Hip-Hop Songs chart, eventually being certified platinum in the United States. "Turnin Me On" spent 10 weeks on the Hot 100. Hilson and Lil Wayne performed the song on Jimmy Kimmel Live! on March 27, 2009. The next single, "Knock You Down" featuring Kanye West and Ne-Yo, achieved more success, reaching number three on the Billboard Hot 100 and number one on the Hot R&B/Hip-Hop Songs chart, eventually being certified two times platinum. The song spent 31 weeks on the Hot 100 and 30 weeks on the Hot R&B/Hip-Hop Songs chart. It also reached the top ten in Canada, Ireland, The Netherlands, New Zealand and the United Kingdom. Hilson and West performed "Knock You Down" on the Late Show with David Letterman on May 4, 2009. "Make Love", "Slow Dance", and "Change Me" featuring Akon, were released as the album's fourth, fifth and sixth US singles, respectively. Hilson performed "Slow Dance" with The Roots on Late Night with Jimmy Fallon on September 18, 2009.

Hilson, along with Gym Class Heroes, Gorilla Zoe and T-Pain, were supporting acts on Lil Wayne's I Am Music Tour in North America. At the 2009 BET Awards, she was nominated in four categories, including Best New Artist, Best Female R&B Artist, as well as Viewer's Choice and Best Collaboration for "Turnin Me On" with Lil Wayne. She eventually won the Best New Artist category. In 2009, Hilson was featured on five singles; "Number One" with R. Kelly, "She Don't Wanna" with Asher Roth, "Everything, Everyday, Everywhere" with Fabolous, "Medicine" with Plies, and on the remix of Sean Paul's song, "Hold My Hand". Hilson was nominated for Breakthrough Artist and Favorite Soul/R&B Female Artist at the 2009 American Music Awards. The re-released edition of In a Perfect World..., in January 2010, included the single "I Like", which reached number one in Germany, Poland and Slovakia, and peaked within the top ten in Austria, Norway and Switzerland. At the 52nd Grammy Awards, Hilson was nominated for Best New Artist and Best Rap/Sung Collaboration for "Knock You Down" with Kanye West and Ne-Yo.

=== 2010–2014: No Boys Allowed and acting debut ===
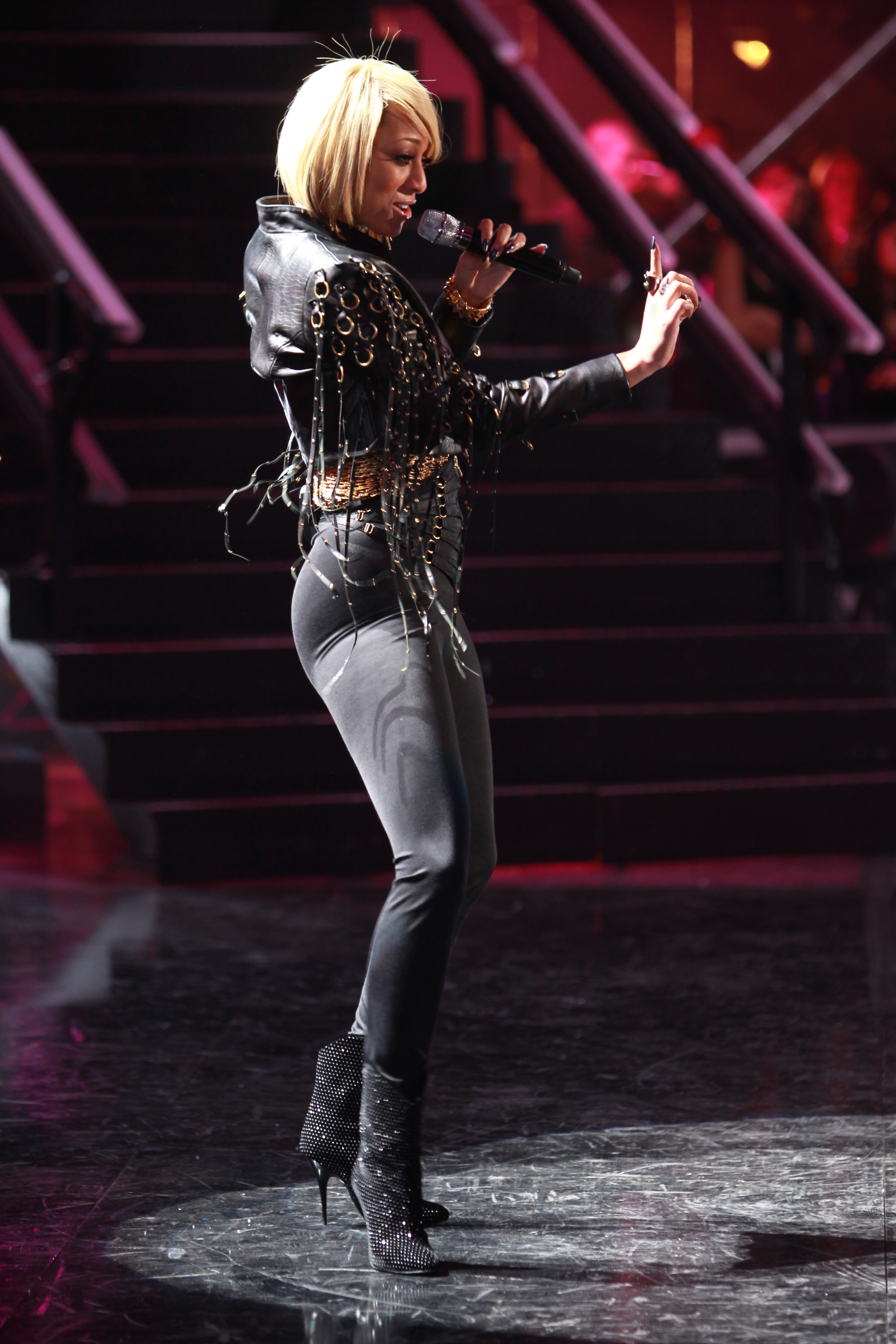
Hilson performing at the 2010 VH1 Divas Salute the Troops concert

During the first half of 2010, Hilson guest featured on rapper Trina's single "Million Dollar Girl", and on T.I.'s single "Got Your Back". In April 2010, it was made known that she had replaced Jennifer Hudson as the new face of the cosmetics and personal care products company Avon. "Breaking Point" was released as the first single from Hilson's second studio album, No Boys Allowed, in September 2010; it only appeared on the US Hot R&B/Hip-Hop Songs Chart at number 44, and spent two weeks on the chart. On December 2, 2010, Hilson was one of the many female artists who performed at the VH1 Divas Salute the Troops concert, where she sang "Turnin Me On", "Knock You Down", "Pretty Girl Rock", and a duet with American country music duo Sugarland on the Aretha Franklin song "Think". No Boys Allowed was released on December 21, 2010. Described as a "girl power album", No Boys Allowed was primarily of the R&B and pop genres. Despite the album's title, Hilson stated "it's not about excluding men. It's more about women understanding that there comes a time in your life when you want a man. A real man. A grown up. Not a boy. And that's not a bad thing." Speaking of the songs on the album, she explained "I write from a female perspective, but I'm also telling men what women are really thinking and feeling about them". In the United States, No Boys Allowed debuted at number 11 on the Billboard 200, and number seven on the Top R&B/Hip-Hop Albums chart, with first-week sales of 102,000 copies. Although the album sold 8,000 copies more than Hilson's debut album In a Perfect World..., it failed to match that album's debut chart position of number four on the Billboard 200, due to No Boys Allowed being released during the festive season with several Christmas albums debuting inside the top-ten. As of February 2011, the album has sold 205,500 copies in the United States.

Hilson achieved success with the album's second single, "Pretty Girl Rock", which reached number 24 on the Billboard Hot 100 and number four on the Hot R&B/Hip-Hop Songs Chart, eventually being certified platinum. The song spent 14 weeks on the Hot 100 and four weeks on the Hot R&B/Hip-Hop Songs Chart. It reached the top twenty in Germany and New Zealand, and top 30 in Austria and Slovakia. Hilson promoted "Pretty Girl Rock" with live performances on televised shows, including The Tonight Show with Jay Leno, the Late Show with David Letterman and Jimmy Kimmel Live!. "One Night Stand" featuring Chris Brown, and "Lose Control (Let Me Down)" featuring Nelly, were released as the album's third and fourth singles, respectively. In 2011, she was featured on British rapper Chipmunk's single "In the Air", for his album Transition (2011). In April 2011, Hilson, along with many other R&B and hip hop acts, traveled to Australia to be part of its biggest urban music festival, Supafest. At the 2011 BET Awards, Hilson was nominated for Best Female R&B Artist and Video of the Year for "Pretty Girl Rock". In July 2011, she was a supporting act on the second leg of Lil Wayne's I Am Still Music Tour in North America, before embarking on her first headlining European tour in October. In 2011, Hilson posed nude for the May issue of Allure magazine. Hilson made her acting debut in the romantic comedy film Think Like a Man, released on April 20, 2012. She also appeared alongside Vin Diesel in the sci-fi action film Riddick (2013), in a brief role as a prisoner allowed to escape to make room for Riddick. Hilson portrayed the character Gigi in the 2021 film For the Love of Money.

=== 2015–2024: Collaborations and touring ===
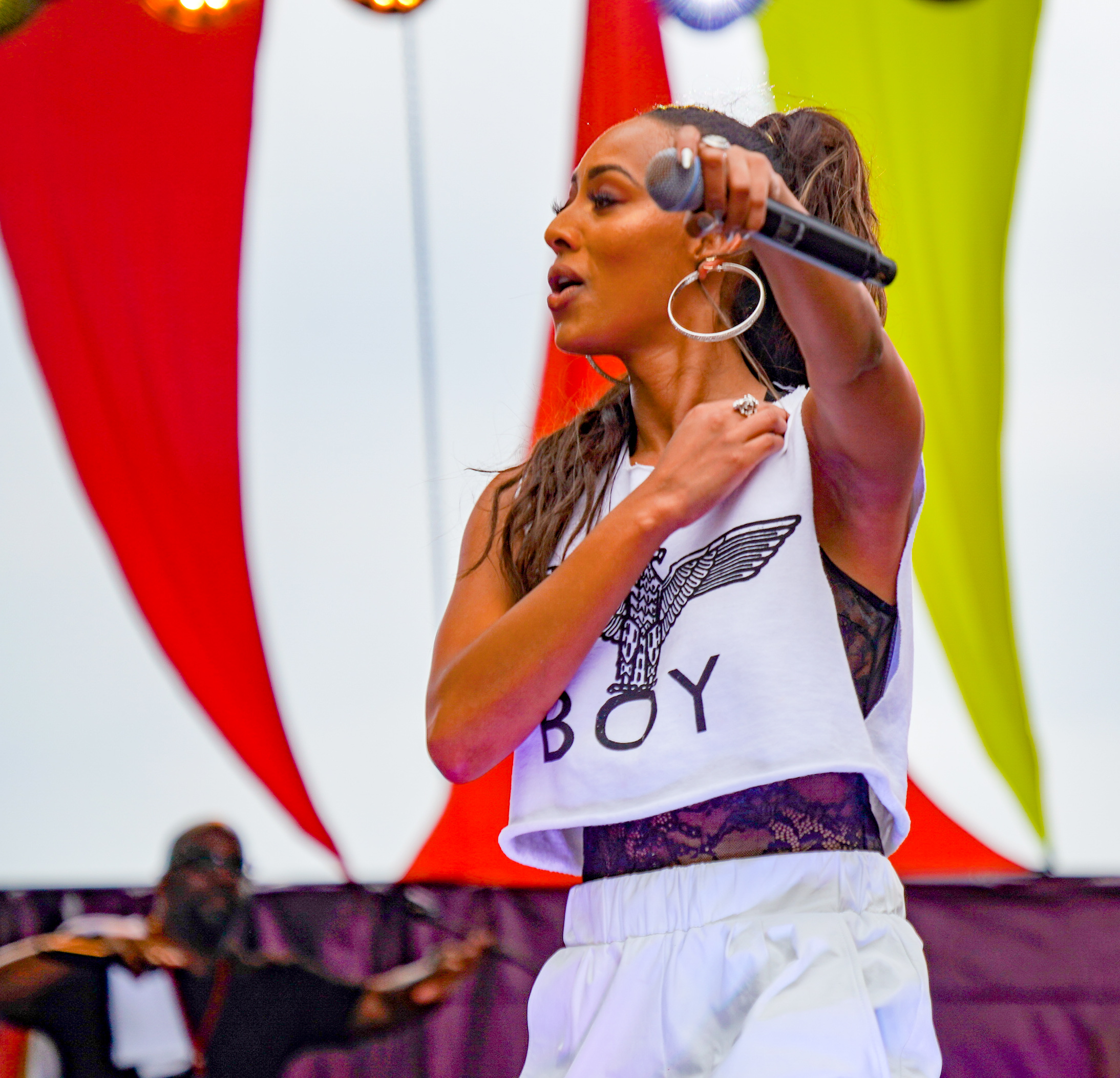
In 2018, Hilson performed at Capital Pride Festival and Concert in Washington, D.C.

On October 25, 2011, during an interview on BET's 106 & Park, Hilson revealed that she had begun recording her third studio album. She explained, "There's some people in the world that aren't gon' like this album coming from me. As I was experiencing the world, there were things that I was also experiencing on a personal front, and in my music it's coming out. There's a specific few people who ain't gon' like to listen to this album. Very emotional, I'll say that." She further explained in an interview with The Boombox that she was working on a new sound for the album, and described it as a mixture of her first two albums with some surprising elements added. At the time, Hilson explained that a release date had not yet been confirmed, saying: "I just write about my experiences and keep the release dates far, far from me. When I feel that I have [good material] is when I will give it to the label. But I'm not quite there yet. I'm still working." On March 14, 2016, a press release was issued stating that Hilson's third album would be titled L.I.A.R., an acronym for Love Is a Religion, with contributions from Chris Brown, Danja, Timbaland and Polow Da Don. It was also reported that the first single would be the Mike Will Made It-produced "Again", which was co-written with Rock City and was due to be released March 18, 2016. Hilson would go on to refute this, stating that the press release from her label Zone 4 was premature and fake. She did confirm that the album would be called L.I.A.R. and confirmed "Again" as a song title but refuted the impending release and single choice. In July 2017, Hilson was featured on Zambian singer Tiwah Hillz's single "Beautiful".

Hilson announced that she would be releasing new music in summer 2019, nine years after her previous album. She performed on the Femme It Forward Tour in summer 2019 alongside Mya, Brandy, Ashanti, Monica and Amerie. In October 2019, Hilson referred to the album as untitled, but said that it was in the final stages of mixing and production. As of July 2023, no further details about the album were released. In April 2020, Hilson was featured on Ghanaian musician Stonebwoy's song "Nominate". She later recommended Rihanna for a future collaboration with the Ghanaian dancehall musician.

=== 2025: We Need To Talk ===
On March 27, 2025, Hilson released the single "Bae"; the single samples Hurricane Chris's 2007 single "A Bay Bay". On the same day, she announced the parent album, her third, would be titled We Need to Talk; the album was released on April 18, 2025. She posted a series of videos, where she spoke about returning to the music industry; she shared, "I just don't want to put my life or my art in the hands of people who don't give a fuck about me [...] The thing is, I don't fear being human — I love being human in my own hands. I fear being human in their hands [...] I'd love nothing more than to release this incredible music I've been 'sitting on. There have been so many blockages I have constantly fought myself to not directly speak about". On April 21, 2025, Hilson released an official visualizer video for the album's second single, "Say That". Later in April 2025, Hilson acted in the Lifetime film Fame: A Temptations Story, alongside Canadian singer and actress Keshia Chanté. On April 25, 2025, "Can't Wait", a song in collaboration with Eric Benét was released. The trilogy continued on September 12, 2025, with the release of We Need to Talk: Drama; single "Again" was released on the same day.

== Artistry ==
"Pretty Girl Rock"
A sample of "Pretty Girl Rock" featuring heavy drums with slinky piano and bouncy R&B beats.

Hilson's music is generally R&B, hip hop and pop. Her debut album, In a Perfect World..., consists of a pop/R&B style, with elements of electro music. Many of the album's themes deal with relationships, physical attraction and lovemaking. Hilson said, "lyrically it's a very vulnerable album. You know, I definitely didn't want to paint myself as perfect on this project. Instead, I wanted it to be something that was very relatable, especially to women".

Her second album, No Boys Allowed, displays a wide variety of styles, including pop, R&B, hip hop, soul, acoustic, electronic and reggae. Hilson describes the album as "more self-assured. It's a lot more aggressive". Kristin Macfarlane of the Rotorua Daily Post noted that the album is "pure girl power and about being sexually confident, and confident as a woman; not putting up with crap relationships and getting your way".

Hilson sings with "smooth vocals". Following the release of her debut album, Sophie Bruce of BBC Music expressed that, "there's no denying Hilson has a great voice, but it lacks the feisty edge of [Nicole] Scherzinger, [Mary J.] Blige or [Beyoncé] Knowles". Mark Nero of About.com commented, "Keri's voice, while strong, isn't particularly distinctive or memorable". Hilson has stated that her musical influences come from her father's side of the family. "My grandmother would sing in the choir; while my dad—while he was in college—sang and recorded with a quartet. ... it was definitely my dad's Southern side that impacted on me musically". Hilson's father also introduced her to artists such as Sade, Anita Baker, The Blind Boys of Alabama, Lisa Stansfield, Take 6 and Stevie Wonder. In addition, she cites Michael Jackson, Lauryn Hill, Janet Jackson, TLC and Aaliyah as her idols.

== Activism and philanthropy ==
Besides her career in music, Hilson has also been involved with several charities. In January 2010, she teamed up with Akon on the charity single "Oh Africa". All proceeds of the single benefited underprivileged African youth. The following month, Hilson joined the extended list of artists during the recording session of the single, "We Are the World 25 for Haiti", to benefit victims of the 2010 Haiti earthquake. On May 25, she performed at the Virginia Stand Up! A Call to Action benefit concert, organized by Chris Brown to help with continued relief efforts in Haiti. On October 21, 2010, Hilson attended Collins Academy High School in Chicago as part of the Get Schooled National Challenge and Tour, a "program aimed at increasing high school and college graduation rates and promoting the importance of education". In 2011, she received a Get Schooled Award for her involvement with the program. Also in 2011, Hilson contributed in the fight against AIDS by posing in retail-clothing company H&M's celebrity-driven collection for Fashion Against AIDS. 25% of all sales from the collection were donated to the Designers Against Aids charity. Hilson contributed to the It Gets Better Project, a project which aims to prevent suicide among LGBT youth.

In June 2011, Hilson became an ambassador for MTV Staying Alive, a foundation which raises awareness and prevention of HIV and AIDS. In September 2011, she lent her support to US First Lady Michelle Obama's Let's Move! campaign, which aims to combat childhood obesity. She made T-shirts for the campaign that read "Pretty Girls Sweat", and exercised with the young women at The Educational Alliance's Sirovich Senior Center in New York City on September 24. During Hilson's visit in Africa in November 2011, she stopped by an orphanage to visit her young fans who had lost their families during the 2010–2011 Ivorian crisis. She gave each orphan a "care" package, which consisted of bookbags, T-shirts, sunglasses, notebooks and an electric keyboard. In April 2012, Hilson worked with DoSomething.org to encourage young people to take part in the nationwide Epic Book Drive by bringing books to local people in need. In a press release, she stated: "Joining DoSomething.org's newest effort to provide for people in need with Epic Book Drive was the easiest decision ever!. I truly believe providing access to those who want to learn is the key to bettering lives around the country. And helping kids find healthy outlets, such as books, has always been a passion of mine. So my involvement here is a natural fit."

Hilson has also become an active opponent of 5G wireless technology, and was criticized for falsely claiming it caused the coronavirus pandemic.

== Discography ==
Studio albums

- In a Perfect World... (2009)
- No Boys Allowed (2010)
- We Need to Talk (2025)

== Filmography ==
Film and television roles
Year	Title	Role	Notes
2012	Think Like a Man	Heather	Film
2013	Riddick	Santana's Prisoner	Film
2016	Almost Christmas	Jasmine	Film
2017	Love by the 10th Date	Billie	Television film for Lifetime
2021	Don't Waste Your Pretty	Mykah	Television film for TV One
2021	Lust: A Seven Deadly Sins Story	Tiffanie Cooper	Television film for Lifetime
2021	The Hotline	London	Television film for BET Her
2021	For the Love of Money	Gigi Davis	Film
2021	A Hip Hop Family Christmas	Jessica Nixon	Television film for VH1
2022	A Hip Hop Family Christmas Wedding	Jessica Nixon	Television film for VH1
2023	Ruined	Alexis Torres	BET+ original film
2025	Fame: A Temptations Story	Cherish	Lifetime original film

== Tours ==
Headlining

- European Tour (2011)

Supporting

- I Am Music Tour (2009) (with Lil Wayne)
- I Am Still Music Tour (2011) (with Lil Wayne)
- Femme It Forward Tour (2019) (with various artists)
- The Millennium Tour: Turned Up! (2022) (with various artists)

== Awards and nominations ==
Year	Nominee / work	Award	Result
2007	"The Way I Are" (Timbaland featuring D.O.E. and Keri Hilson)	MTV Video Music Award for Monster Single of the Year	Nominated
2009	Herself	American Music Award for Favorite Female Soul/R&B Artist	Nominated
2009	Herself	American Music Award for Breakthrough Artist	Nominated
2009	Herself	BET Award for Best New Artist	Won
2009	Herself	BET Award for Best Female R&B Artist	Nominated
2009	"Turnin Me On" (with Lil Wayne)	BET Award for Viewer's Choice	Nominated
2009	"Turnin Me On" (with Lil Wayne)	BET Award for Best Collaboration	Nominated
2009	In a Perfect World...	Urban Music Award for Best Album	Nominated
2009	Herself	Urban Music Award for Best Female Act	Nominated
2009	Herself	MOBO Award for Best International Act	Nominated
2009	Herself	MOBO Award for Best R&B/Soul Act	Won
2009	Herself	Soul Train Music Award for Best New Artist	Won
2009	"Turnin Me On" (with Lil Wayne)	Soul Train Music Award for Song of the Year	Nominated
2009	"Knock You Down" (with Kanye West and Ne-Yo)	Soul Train Music Award for Best Collaboration	Won
2009	"Knock You Down" (with Kanye West and Ne-Yo)	Soul Train Music Award for Record of the Year	Nominated
2010	"Knock You Down" (with Kanye West and Ne-Yo)	Grammy Award for Best Rap/Sung Collaboration	Nominated
2010	Herself	Grammy Award for Best New Artist	Nominated
2010	Herself	NAACP Image Award for Outstanding New Artist	Won
2010	"Got Your Back" (T.I. featuring Keri Hilson)	Soul Train Music Award for Best Hip-Hop Song	Nominated
2011	"Pretty Girl Rock"	BET Award for Video of the Year	Nominated
2011	Herself	BET Award for Best Female R&B Artist	Nominated
2011	Herself	Get Schooled Award	Won
2011	"Pretty Girl Rock"	Soul Train Music Award for Best Dance Performance	Nominated
2019	Herself	Power of Women Fundraising Gala honored with The Philanthropy Award	Won
