= Mosley Music Group =

American record label

- Parent company: Universal Music Group
- Founded: 2005; 20 years ago
- Founder: Timbaland
- Distributor: Def Jam
- Genre: Various
- Country of origin: United States
- Official website: mosleymusicgroup.com

Mosley Music Group (MMG) is a record label founded and formed by producer Timothy "Timbaland" Mosley in 2005. A successor to his previous label Beat Club, it has operated as an imprint of Def Jam Recordings since 2019. Previously, the label operated an imprint of Interscope Records (2006–2014) and Epic Records (2014–2019).

== History ==
The label was created after Timbaland's former label, Beat Club, folded. The first album release from MMG, Nelly Furtado's Loose, went on to be certified platinum. The label's second release was Timbaland's own second album Shock Value. MMG's third release was OneRepublic's debut album Dreaming Out Loud on November 20, 2007, from which the single "Apologize" hit #2 on the Billboard Hot 100. The week ending November 10, 2007, "Apologize" was the biggest radio airplay hit in the history of Top 40 radio in North America, racking up an astounding 10,331 spins beating the previous record held by Nelly Furtado's hit "Promiscuous". In February 2008 SoundScan data reported that "Apologize" was one of only two songs in history to sell 3 million digital downloads.

After nearly ten years with Interscope Records, Timbaland moved distribution to Epic Records in November 2014. The move to the new label was due to his involvement in the success of Michael Jackson's second posthumous album Xscape. Most of the artists signed to Mosley Music Group will have their future recordings handled by Epic with the exception of OneRepublic, who will remain at Interscope.

== Artists ==
- Timbaland
- Carson Lueders

=== Former artists ===
- Magoo
- Izza Kizza
- Keri Hilson
- Hayes
- Billy Blue
- Soul Diggaz
- Chris Cornell
- Lyrica Anderson
- D.O.E.
- SoShy
- Nelly Furtado
- Bubba Sparxxx
- V. Bozeman
- Tink
- Cosha TG
- Yung Tory
- OneRepublic

== Discography ==
Title	Chart positions								
Title	U.S.	U.K.	Europe	France	Australia	Canada	New Zealand	Germany	Italy
Loose: Artist: Nelly Furtado; Released: June 9, 2006; Singles: No Hay Igual, Promiscuous, Maneater, Te Busqué, All Good Things (Come to an End), Say It Right, In God's Hands, Do It	1	4	1	5	4	1	1	1	3
Shock Value: Artist: Timbaland; Released: April 3, 2007; Singles: Give It To Me, The Way I Are, Throw It On Me, Apologize, Scream	5	2	1	13	1	2	4	5	13
Dreaming Out Loud: Artist: OneRepublic; Released: November 20, 2007; Singles: Apologize, Stop and Stare, Say (All I Need), Mercy, Come Home	14	2	4	76	4	24	3	7	29
Scream: Artist: Chris Cornell; Released: March 10, 2009; Singles: Long Gone, Watch Out, Ground Zero, Scream, Part of Me	10	70	—	—	—	13	—	—	—
In a Perfect World...: Artist: Keri Hilson; Released: March 24, 2009; Singles: Energy, Return The Favor, Turnin' Me On, Knock You Down, Slow Dance, I Like	4	22	—	—	23	13	16	28	49
Waking Up: Artist: OneRepublic; Released: November 17, 2009; Singles: All The Right Moves, Secrets, Marchin On, Good Life	21	29	—	58	—	—	—	19	—
Shock Value 2: Artist: Timbaland; Released: December 8, 2009; Singles: Morning After Dark, Say Something, Carry Out, If We Ever Meet Again, Talk That (non-album single)	36	25	—	73	35	16	36	15	56
No Boys Allowed: Artist: Keri Hilson; Released: December 21, 2010; Singles: Breaking Point, Pretty Girl Rock, The Way You Love Me, One Night Stand	11	—	—	—	—	—	—	—	—
The Spirit Indestructible: Artist: Nelly Furtado; Released: September 18, 2012; Singles: Big Hoops (Bigger the Better), Spirit Indestructible, Parking Lot, Waiting for the Night	79	46	—	—	—	18	—	3	36
Native: Artist: OneRepublic; Released: March 22, 2013; Singles: Feel Again, If I Lose Myself, Counting Stars, Something I Need, Love Runs Out, I Lived	4	9	—	52	8	12	12	4	31

== See also ==
- List of record labels
