= Energy (Keri Hilson song) =

2008 single by Keri Hilson

Single by Keri Hilson

from the album In a Perfect World…
- Released: May 27, 2008
- Studio: Homesite 13 (Novato, California)
- Genre: R&B
- Length: 3:29
- Label: Mosley Music; Zone 4
- Songwriters: Louis Biancaniello; Richard Butler, Jr.; Sam Watters; Wayne Wilkins
- Producer: The Runaways

Keri Hilson singles chronology
"Hero" (2008)	"Energy" (2008)	"Superhuman" (2008)

Music video
- "Keri Hilson - Energy (Official Music Video)" on YouTube

"Energy" is a song by American recording artist Keri Hilson. It was written and produced by production team the Runaways, consisting of Louis Biancaniello, Sam Watters, Rico Love, and Wayne Wilkins, for her studio album In a Perfect World… (2009). A midtempo power ballad, "Energy" talks about an overwhelming and consuming toxic love that is causing the protagonist to reconsider her priorities.

The song was released as Hilson's solo debut single as well as the album's leading single in the United States on May 27, 2008. Although being released worldwide, it initially only charted in New Zealand at number two and managed to reach top thirty on the US Billboard Hot R&B/Hip-Hop Songs and Hot Dance Club Play charts. Generally well received by music critics, it was named sixty-first on the Top 144 Songs of 2008 listing by Blender magazine.

== Background ==
"Energy" was written and produced by the Runaways. It was also recorded by the Runaways at Homesite 13 studios in Novato, California. Hilson stated that she wanted to prove that she can be successful even without collaborations and guest vocalists and so it was announced "Energy" would be released as the next worldwide single following the success of "Knock You Down." The song was released on September 14, 2009, in the UK. On September 25, 2009, she appeared live on breakfast TV show GMTV in the UK where she performed the single. That same day, she appeared on BBC Radio 1's Live Lounge where she performed a stripped version of "Energy" as well as a gospel cover version of "Supernova" originally sung by Mr Hudson and Kanye West.

== Critical reception ==
Nick Levine from Digital Spy found that "despite its glistening production, this synthy R&B ballad falls into the solid but unspectacular category. "I don't want us to be the end of me, this love is taking all of my energy," Hilson sings on the chorus, but her vocals are a little too controlled to convey these anguished emotions. Still, it's already become her first UK chart entry without a mate to hold her hand, which is a success of sorts." Billboard described the song as a "midtempo power ballad showcasing Hilson's range and soul [...] The Runaways provide a catchy hook."

Complete Music Update felt that "Energy" was "not a track that will blow your mind or take over the charts like Rhianna's "Umbrella. Its simple lyrics [...] are wrapped around a characteristic R&B beat which make it a solid but standard single, though there is no denying that the girl can sing." BBC Radio 1 editor Fraser McAlpine compared the song "Apologize" by American band OneRepublic and "Battlefield" by singer Jordin Sparks. He found that "Energy" was "this two songs being nailed together clumsily, and then thrown out in the rain, with a price tag hanging from one of the rusty spikes." Slant Magazine's Sal Cinquemani called the song "ironically lifeless."

== Chart performance ==
"Energy" reached its highest chart peak in New Zealand, where it peaked at number two on the New Zealand Singles Chart and was certified Gold by Recorded Music NZ (RMNZ) on November 30, 2008, for sales over 7,500 copies. In Australia, the peaked at number 55 on the Australian Singles Chart and number 19 on the Australian Urban Singles chart. In the United States, "Energy" was less successful; it peaked at number 78 on the US Billboard Hot 100 but managed to reach top thirty on the Hot R&B/Hip-Hop Songs and Hot Dance Club Play charts.

== Music video ==
The music video for "Energy" was directed by Melina Matsoukas and produced by Wohn Winter. Set primarily in a boxing ring, Hilson plays a boxer whose love interest (played by Christian Keyes) is her apparent trainer. Hilson explains that her character continually tries to sort their broken relationship, but by the end of the video, she realizes that it's just not working. Throughout the video, there are cutaways in which Hilson argues with her boyfriend in their apartment, Hilson working out, having recently worked out and now in locker room, singing against a wall, and singing in a hallway.

== Track listings ==
International CD

1. "Energy" (radio edit) – 3:28
2. "Energy" (Wideboys radio mix) – 3:04

International maxi CD; download bundle

1. "Energy" (The Demolition Crew remix) – 3:03
2. "Energy" (DJ Q remix) – 4:23
3. "Energy" (instrumental) – 3:29
4. "Energy" (acapella) – 3:16

== Personnel ==
Personnel are adapted from the In the Perfect World... liner notes.

- The Runaways – producer, engineer, recording, mixing
- Ravaughn Brown – additional vocals
- Dru Castro – additional recording

== Charts ==
=== Weekly charts ===
Weekly chart performance for "Energy"
Chart (2008–09)	Peak position
Australia (ARIA)	55
New Zealand (Recorded Music NZ)	2
Scottish Singles Sales (Official Charts)	16
Switzerland (Schweizer Hitparade)	64
UK Singles (Official Charts)	43
UK Hip Hop/R&B (Official Charts)	15
US Billboard Hot 100	78
US Dance Club Songs (Billboard)	12
US Hot R&B/Hip-Hop Songs (Billboard)	21
US Rhythmic Airplay (Billboard)	35

=== Year-end charts ===
Year-end chart performance for "Energy"
Chart (2008)	Position
US Hot R&B/Hip-Hop Songs (Billboard)	95

== Certifications ==
Certifications for "Energy"
Region	Certification	Certified units/sales
New Zealand (RMNZ)	Gold	7,500^{*}
^{*} Sales figures based on certification alone.

== Release history ==
Release dates and formats for "Energy"
Region	Date	Format(s)	Label	Ref.
United States	May 27, 2008	Digital download	Mosley; Zone 4	
United States	July 17, 2008	Rhythm radio	Mosley; Zone 4	
United States	August 5, 2008	Mainstream radio	Mosley; Zone 4	
United Kingdom	September 13, 2009	Digital download	Polydor	
United Kingdom	September 14, 2009	CD single	Polydor	
