= Keri Hilson discography =

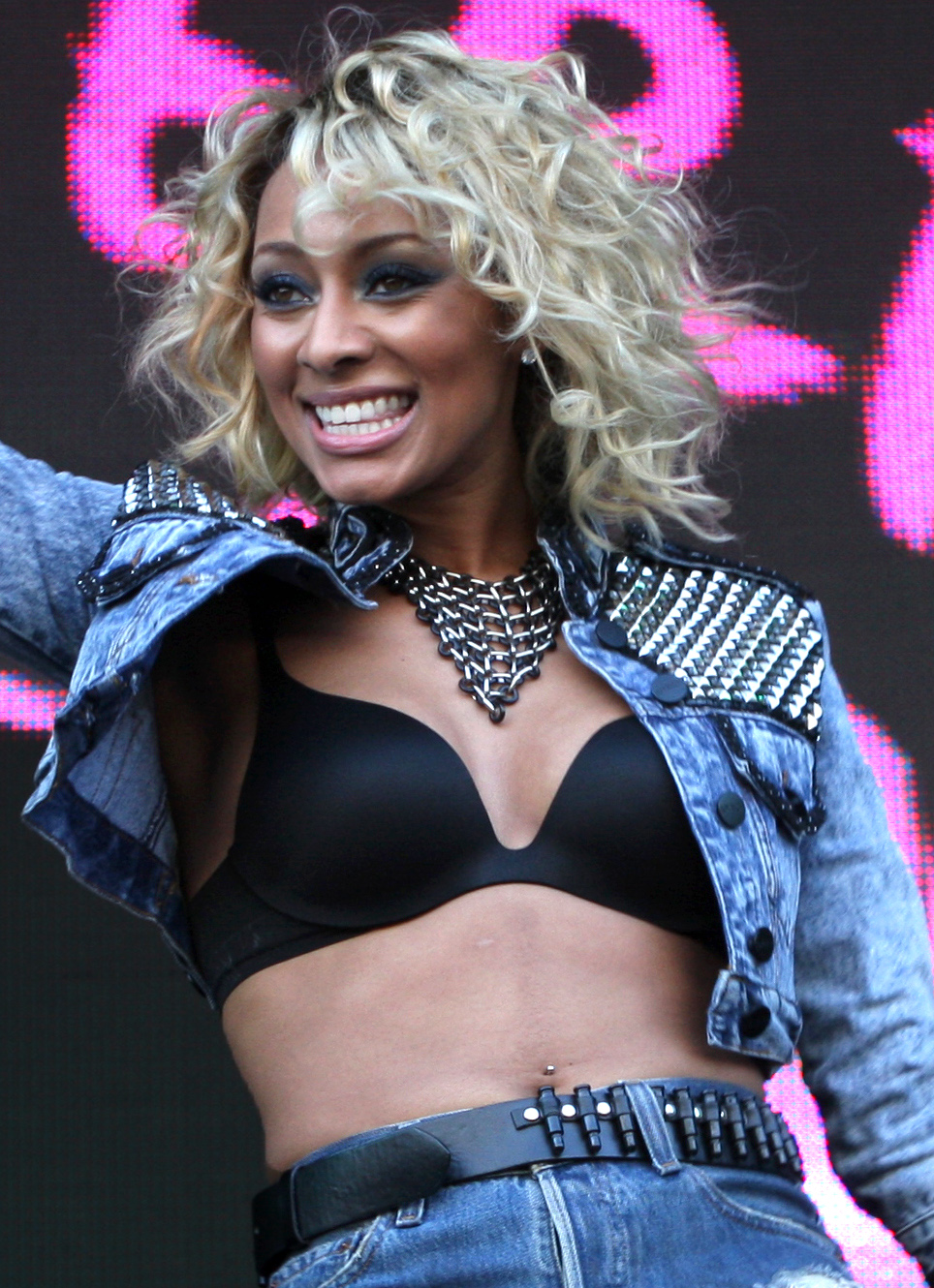
- Hilson performing in 2011
- Studio albums: 3
- Singles: 34
- Music videos: 35
- As featured artist: 17

The discography of American R&B singer Keri Hilson consists of three studio albums, 34 singles (including 18 as a featured artist), and 35 music videos. Hilson began her career as a songwriter, penning tracks for several artists in the mid-2000s as part of the five-person production and songwriting team The Clutch. Together, they co-wrote songs for artists including Mary J. Blige, Omarion, The Pussycat Dolls and Britney Spears. Hilson's solo discography began when she was featured on "Hey Now (Mean Muggin)", a 2004 single by American rapper Xzibit, which reached the top 10 in the United Kingdom. In 2006, Hilson signed to Mosley Music Group, a record label created by American record producer and rapper Timbaland.

The following year, Hilson was featured on Timbaland's single "The Way I Are", which topped the charts around the world, including Australia, Germany, England Ireland, Norway and the United Kingdom. "Energy" was released as Hilson's debut single as a solo artist in May 2008. Her debut studio album In a Perfect World... was released in March 2009 and debuted at number four on the US Billboard 200 chart and number one on the US Top R&B/Hip-Hop Albums chart. The album was later certified gold by the Recording Industry Association of America (RIAA), for selling more than 500,000 copies. "Return the Favor", another collaboration with Timbaland, was released as the album's second single and reached the top 20 in Ireland and the United Kingdom, and the top 30 in Austria and Germany. Subsequent singles from the album include, "Turnin Me On" and "Knock You Down", the latter of which reached number three on the US Billboard Hot 100 chart and number one on the US Hot R&B/Hip-Hop Songs chart. Both songs received platinum certifications in the United States. A reissue of In a Perfect World... included the single "I Like", which reached number one in Germany and Slovakia, while charting within the top 10 in three other countries. Throughout 2009 and 2010, Hilson was featured on several singles by other artists, including "Number One" with R. Kelly, "Medicine" with Plies and "Got Your Back" with T.I.

Hilson's second studio album No Boys Allowed was released in December 2010 and debuted at number 11 on the US Billboard 200 chart and number seven on the US Top R&B/Hip-Hop Albums chart. The album's lead single "Breaking Point" only charted on the US Hot R&B/Hip-Hop Songs chart at number 44. "Pretty Girl Rock" was released as the album's second single and reached the top 20 in Germany and New Zealand, and the top 30 in the United States, Austria and Slovakia. The song received a platinum certification in the United States. "One Night Stand", featuring American singer Chris Brown, and "Lose Control (Let Me Down)", featuring American rapper Nelly, were released as the album's third and fourth singles, respectively.

After a long hiatus, Hilson returned with her third studio album, We Need to Talk, on April 18, 2025. It was preceded by the lead single, "Bae", on March 27, 2025; it was Hilson's first single as a lead artist since 2011's "Lose Control".

== Albums ==
=== Studio albums ===
List of albums, with selected chart positions and certifications
Title	Album details	Peak chart positions								Sales	Certifications
Title	Album details	US	US R&B	GER	GRE	IRL	NZ	SWI	UK	Sales	Certifications
In a Perfect World...	Released: March 24, 2009; Label: Interscope, Zone 4, Mosley; Formats: CD, digital download	4	1	28	33	35	16	65	22	US: 500,000	RIAA: Gold; BPI: Gold; RMNZ: Platinum
No Boys Allowed	Released: December 21, 2010; Label: Interscope, Zone 4, Mosley; Formats: CD, digital download	11	7	—	—	96	—	—	76	US: 205,500	RMNZ: Gold
We Need to Talk	Released: April 18, 2025 (Love); September 12, 2025 (Drama); March 20, 2026 (Redemption); Label: Audible Art Club, Create Music Group; Formats: Streaming, digital download	—	—	—	—	—	—	—	—		
"—" denotes a recording that did not chart or was not released in that territory.

== Singles ==
=== As lead artist ===
List of singles, with selected chart positions and certifications, showing year released and album name
Title	Year	Peak chart positions										Certifications	Album
Title	Year	US	US R&B	AUS	AUT	GER	IRL	NZ	NOR	SWI	UK	Certifications	Album
"Energy"	2008	78	21	55	—	—	—	2	—	64	43	RMNZ: Gold	In a Perfect World...
"Return the Favor" (featuring Timbaland)	2008	—	—	80	25	21	19	—	—	—	19		In a Perfect World...
"Turnin Me On" (featuring Lil Wayne)	2008	15	2	—	—	—	—	29	—	—	—	RIAA: Platinum	In a Perfect World...
"Knock You Down" (featuring Kanye West and Ne-Yo)	2009	3	1	24	37	30	2	1	11	—	5	RIAA: 2× Platinum; ARIA: Gold; BPI: 2× Platinum; RMNZ: 4× Platinum	In a Perfect World...
"Make Love"	2009	—	— (Note: "Make Love" did not enter the Hot R&B/Hip-Hop Songs chart, but peaked at number 10 on the Bubbling Under R&B/Hip-Hop Singles chart.)	—	—	—	—	—	—	—	—		In a Perfect World...
"Slow Dance"	2009	—	49	—	—	—	—	—	—	—	—		In a Perfect World...
"I Like"	2009	—	—	—	2	1	—	—	3	5	34	BVMI: 3× Gold; IFPI SWI: Platinum	In a Perfect World...
"Breaking Point"	2010	— (Note: "Breaking Point" did not enter the Billboard Hot 100, but peaked at number 17 on the Bubbling Under Hot 100 Singles chart.)	44	—	—	—	—	—	—	—	—		No Boys Allowed
"Pretty Girl Rock"	2010	24	4	81	21	14	50	11	—	62	53	RIAA: Platinum; BPI: Silver; RMNZ: 2× Platinum	No Boys Allowed
"One Night Stand" (featuring Chris Brown)	2011	—	19	—	—	—	—	—	—	—	—		No Boys Allowed
"Lose Control (Let Me Down)" (featuring Nelly)	2011	—	77	—	—	—	—	36	—	—	—		No Boys Allowed
"Bae"	2025	—	—	—	—	—	—	—	—	—	—		We Need to Talk: Love
"Can't Wait" (with Eric Benét)	2025	—	—	—	—	—	—	—	—	—	—		The Co-Star
"Say That"	2025	—	—	—	—	—	—	—	—	—	—		We Need to Talk: Love
"Again"	2025	—	—	—	—	—	—	—	—	—	—		We Need to Talk: Drama
"XO - My Gift Interlude"	2026	—	—	—	—	—	—	—	—	—	—		We Need to Talk: Redemption
"—" denotes a recording that did not chart or was not released in that territory.

=== As featured artist ===
List of singles, with selected chart positions and certifications, showing year released and album name
Title	Year	Peak chart positions										Certifications	Album
Title	Year	US	US R&B	AUS	AUT	GER	IRL	NZ	NOR	SWI	UK	Certifications	Album
"Hey Now (Mean Muggin)" (Xzibit featuring Keri Hilson)	2004	93	52	44	—	33	14	21	—	42	9		Weapons of Mass Destruction
"Help" (Lloyd Banks featuring Keri Hilson)	2006	—	77	—	—	—	—	—	—	—	—		Rotten Apple
"The Way I Are" (Timbaland featuring Keri Hilson and D.O.E.)	2007	3	59	1	4	5	1	2	1	3	1	RIAA: 3× Platinum; ARIA: Platinum; BPI: 3× Platinum; BVMI: 5× Gold; IFPI SWI: Platinum; RMNZ: 6× Platinum	Shock Value
"Good Things" (Rich Boy featuring Polow da Don and Keri Hilson)	2007	—	54	—	—	—	—	—	—	—	—		Rich Boy
"Scream" (Timbaland featuring Keri Hilson and Nicole Scherzinger)	2007	— (Note: "Scream" did not enter the Billboard Hot 100, but peaked at number 22 on the Bubbling Under Hot 100 Singles chart.)	—	20	18	9	10	9	17	45	12		Shock Value
"Hero" (Nas featuring Keri Hilson)	2008	97	82	—	—	—	—	—	—	70	70		Untitled
"Superhuman" (Chris Brown featuring Keri Hilson)	2008	— (Note: "Superhuman" did not enter the Billboard Hot 100, but peaked at number nine on the Bubbling Under Hot 100 Singles chart.)	— (Note: "Superhuman" did not enter the Hot R&B/Hip-Hop Songs chart, but peaked at number 20 on the Bubbling Under R&B/Hip-Hop Singles chart.)	30	—	—	15	15	—	—	32	RIAA: Gold; ARIA: Platinum; RMNZ: Gold	Exclusive
"Numba 1 (Tide Is High)" (Kardinal Offishall featuring Keri Hilson)	2008	—	—	—	—	—	—	—	—	—	84		Not 4 Sale
"Everything, Everyday, Everywhere" (Fabolous featuring Keri Hilson)	2009	— (Note: "Everything, Everyday, Everywhere" did not enter the Billboard Hot 100, but peaked at number three on the Bubbling Under Hot 100 Singles chart.)	31	—	—	—	—	—	—	—	—		Loso's Way
"Number One" (R. Kelly featuring Keri Hilson)	2009	59	8	—	—	—	—	—	—	—	190		Untitled
"She Don't Wanna Man" (Asher Roth featuring Keri Hilson)	2009	—	—	—	—	—	—	—	—	—	156		Asleep in the Bread Aisle
"Medicine" (Plies featuring Keri Hilson)	2009	— (Note: "Medicine" did not enter the Billboard Hot 100, but peaked at number seven on the Bubbling Under Hot 100 Singles chart.)	47	—	—	—	—	—	—	—	—		Goon Affiliated
"Hold My Hand" (Sean Paul featuring Keri Hilson)	2009	—	— (Note: "Hold My Hand" did not enter the Hot R&B/Hip-Hop Songs chart, but peaked at number 10 on the Bubbling Under R&B/Hip-Hop Singles chart.)	—	—	60	—	—	—	37	—		Imperial Blaze
"Million Dollar Girl" (Trina featuring Keri Hilson & Diddy)	2010	—	61	—	—	—	—	—	—	—	—		Amazin'
"Got Your Back" (T.I. featuring Keri Hilson)	2010	38	10	—	—	—	33	—	—	—	45	RIAA: Platinum; RMNZ: Gold	No Mercy
"Oh Africa" (Akon featuring Keri Hilson)	2010	—	—	—	—	—	—	—	—	52	56		Listen Up! The Official 2010 FIFA World Cup Album
"In the Air" (Chipmunk featuring Keri Hilson)	2011	—	—	—	—	—	—	—	—	—	33		Transition
"Beautiful" (Tiwah Hillz featuring Keri Hilson)	2017	—	—	—	—	—	—	—	—	—	—		Non-album single
"—" denotes a recording that did not chart or was not released in that territory.

=== Promotional singles ===
List of promotional singles, showing year released and album name
Title	Year	Album
"Get It Girl"	2008	Non-album promotional single
"Change Me" (featuring Akon)	2009	In a Perfect World...

== Other charted songs ==
List of non-single songs with selected chart positions
Title	Year	Peak chart positions				Album
Title	Year	US	US R&B	AUS	UK	Album
"Turn My Swag On" (Remix)	2009	—	66	—	—	—N/a
"Get Your Money Up" (featuring Keyshia Cole and Trina)	2009	—	83	—	—	In a Perfect World...
"Liv Tonight" (Nelly featuring Keri Hilson)	2010	75	—	39	54	5.0
"—" denotes a recording that did not chart or was not released in that territory.

== Other appearances ==
=== Soundtrack appearances ===
List of soundtrack appearances by Keri Hilson
Title	Year	Film
"Hands & Feet"	2005	In the Mix
"Freedom Ride"	2012	Think Like a Man

=== Album appearances ===
List of non-single songs with album appearances by Keri Hilson
Title	Year	Album
"After Love" (Diddy featuring Keri Hilson)	2006	Press Play
"Let Me Luv U" (Chingy featuring Keri Hilson)	2006	Hoodstar
"Lost Girls" (Rich Boy featuring Rock City and Keri Hilson)	2007	Rich Boy
"Miscommunication" (Timbaland featuring Keri Hilson and Sebastian)	2007	Shock Value
"Hello" (Timbaland featuring Keri Hilson and Attitude)	2007	Shock Value
"All Eyes on Me" (Clipse featuring Keri Hilson)	2009	Til the Casket Drops
"The One I Love" (Timbaland featuring D.O.E. and Keri Hilson)	2009	Shock Value II
"Don't Look Now" (Far East Movement featuring Keri Hilson)	2010	Free Wired
"Liv Tonight" (Nelly featuring Keri Hilson)	2010	5.0
"World Cry" (Lloyd featuring R. Kelly, Keri Hilson and K'naan)	2011	King of Hearts
"Never Let Go" (Anthony Hamilton featuring Keri Hilson)	2011	Back to Love
"Nominate" (Stonebwoy featuring Keri Hilson)	2020	Anloga Junction

== Music videos ==
List of music videos as a lead artist
Title	Year	Director(s)
"Energy"	2008	Melina Matsoukas
"Return the Favor" (featuring Timbaland)	2008	Melina Matsoukas
"Turnin Me On" (featuring Lil Wayne)	2008	Erik White
"Make Love"	2009	Matt Barnes
"Knock You Down" (featuring Kanye West and Ne-Yo)	2009	Chris Robinson
"Slow Dance"	2009	Paul Hunter
"I Like"	2009	Aaron Platt
"Change Me" (featuring Akon)	2010	
"Breaking Point"	2010	Bryan Barber
"Pretty Girl Rock"	2010	Joseph Kahn
"The Way You Love Me" (featuring Rick Ross)	2010	Laurieann Gibson
"One Night Stand" (featuring Chris Brown)	2011	Colin Tilley
"Lose Control" (featuring Nelly)	2011	Colin Tilley
"Say That"	2025	
"Searchin" (with Method Man)	2025	
"Again"	2025	

List of music videos as a featured artist
Title	Year	Director(s)
"Hey Now (Mean Muggin)" (with Xzibit)	2004	Benny Boom
"Help" (with Lloyd Banks)	2006	Melina Matsoukas
"The Way I Are" (with Timbaland and D.O.E.)	2007	Shane Drake
"Good Things" (with Rich Boy and Polow da Don)	2007	Ulysses Terrero
"Scream" (with Timbaland and Nicole Scherzinger)	2007	Justin Francis
"Love in This Club" (Cameo appearance)	2008	Brothers Strause
"Hero" (with Nas)	2008	Taj
"Superhuman" (with Chris Brown)	2008	Erik White
"Numba 1 (Tide Is High)" (with Kardinal Offishall)	2008	Gil Green
"Miss Independent" (Cameo appearance)	2008	Chris Robinson
"Number One" (with R. Kelly)	2009	Chris Robinson
"She Don't Wanna Man" (with Asher Roth)	2009	Jonathan Lia
"Medicine" (with Plies)	2009	Yolande Geralds
"Everything, Everyday, Everywhere" (with Fabolous)	2009	Erik White
"Million Dollar Girl" (with Trina and Diddy)	2010	Gil Green
"Oh Africa" (with Akon)	2010	Gil Green
"Got Your Back" (with T.I.)	2010	Chris Robinson
"Yo Side of the Bed" (Cameo appearance)	2010	Yolande Geralds
"In the Air" (with Chipmunk)	2011	Colin Tilley
"Beautiful" (with Tiwah Hillz)	2017	—N/a
"Nominate" (with Stonebwoy)	2020	Denzel Williams

== Production discography ==
indicates a song that was released as a single.

Title	Year	Artist(s)	Chart performance									Album	Credits
Title	Year	Artist(s)	US	AUS	BEL (FL)	CAN	GER	NZ	SWE	UK	US R&B	Album	Credits
"Jump"	2002	Michico	—	—	—	—	—	—	—	—	—	I Do	Writer
"What Would You Do"	2003	Kelly Rowland	—	—	—	—	—	—	—	—	—	Simply Deep (Japanese edition)	Writer, Vocal production
"Choosin'"	2003	Too Short	—	—	—	—	—	—	—	—	—	Married To The Game	Backing vocals
"I'm Not Alone"	2003	Crystal Kay	—	—	—	—	—	—	—	—	—	4 Real	Writer
"Play Our Song"	2003	Ruben Studdard	—	—	—	—	—	—	—	—	—	Soulful	Writer
"Red Light" (solo or featuring Lil Jon and Ludacris)	2004	Usher	—	—	—	—	—	—	—	—	—	Confessions (Special edition)	Writer
"Ooh Baby"	2004	Ciara	—	—	—	—	—	—	—	—	—	Goodies	Writer
"Red Hair"	2004	Shawn Desman	—	—	—	— (Note: "Red Hair" did not enter the Canadian Hot 100, but did peak at number 9 on the Canadian CHR/Top 40 Airplay chart.)	—	—	—	—	—	Back for More	Writing, backing vocals
"Bite the Dust"	2005	The Pussycat Dolls	—	—	—	—	—	—	—	—	—	PCD	Writing, production
"Wait a Minute" (featuring Timbaland)	2005	The Pussycat Dolls	28	16	18	24	27	17	25	108	—	PCD	Writing, vocal production
"Heartbreak"	2005	B5	—	—	—	—	—	—	—	—	—	B5	Writing, production, backing vocals
"Pimpin' All Over the World" (featuring Bobby Valentino)	2005	Ludacris	9	28	—	—	—	—	—	—	5	The Red Light District	Backing vocals
"Please"	2005	Toni Braxton	108	—	—	—	—	—	—	—	36	Libra	Backing vocals
"Supposed to Be"	2005	Toni Braxton	—	—	—	—	—	—	—	—	—	Libra	Writer, backing vocals
"Take Me as I Am"	2005	Mary J. Blige	58	—	—	—	—	—	—	—	3	The Breakthrough	Writer, vocal production
"Young Love"	2005	Chris Brown	—	—	—	—	—	—	—	—	—	Chris Brown	Writer
"Runaway Love" (featuring Mary J. Blige)	2006	Ludacris	2	—	—	—	—	21	—	52	3	Release Therapy	Writer, backing vocals
"At the Park"	2006	Field Mob	—	—	—	—	—	—	—	—	—	Light Poles and Pine Trees	Backing vocals
"Hit List"	2006	Paula Campbell	—	—	—	—	—	—	—	—	—	Non-album singles	Writer
"Whuteva"	2006	Remy Ma	—	—	—	—	—	—	—	—	—	There's Something About Remy: Based on a True Story	Writer
"4 Minutes"	2006	Avant	57	—	—	—	—	—	—	—	9	Director	Writer
"Want It"	2006	Danity Kane	—	—	—	—	—	—	—	—	—	Danity Kane	Writer
"Right Now"	2006	Danity Kane	—	—	—	—	—	—	—	—	—	Danity Kane	Writer
"Ice Box" (featuring Timbaland)	2006	Omarion	12	36	—	—	40	10	—	14	5	21	Writer
"What Love Can Do"	2006	LeToya	—	—	—	—	—	—	—	—	—	LeToya	Writer, backing vocals
"Too Much"	2006	Keshia Chanté	—	—	—	—	—	—	—	—	—	2U	Writer
"Cut Off Time" (featuring Kat DeLuna)	2006	Omarion	—	—	—	—	—	—	—	—	123	Feel the Noise: OST	Writer
"I'm Coming Home"	2007	Tank	—	—	—	—	—	—	—	—	—	Sex, Love & Pain	Writer
"I Love U"	2007	Tank	—	—	—	—	—	—	—	—	—	Sex, Love & Pain	Writer
"Release" (featuring Justin Timberlake)	2007	Timbaland	91	—	—	—	—	—	—	105	—	Shock Value	Backing vocals
"Gimme More"	2007	Britney Spears	3	3	5	1	7	15	2	3	—	Blackout	Writing, production, backing vocals
"Break the Ice"	2007	Britney Spears	43	23	7	9	25	24	11	15	—	Blackout	Writing, backing vocals
"Perfect Lover"	2007	Britney Spears	—	—	—	—	—	—	—	—	—	Blackout	Writing, backing vocals
"Outta This World"	2007	Britney Spears	—	—	—	—	—	—	—	—	—	Blackout	Writing, backing vocals
"Wrong When You're Gone"	2007	Jennifer Lopez	—	—	—	—	—	—	—	—	—	Brave	Writing, backing vocals
"Joystick (The Game Song)"	2007	Keke Palmer	—	—	—	—	—	—	—	—	—	So Uncool	Writer
"Let's Go"	2007	Bobby Valentino	—	—	—	—	—	—	—	—	—	Special Occasion	Writer
"Hold On"	2008	Spensha Baker	—	—	—	—	—	—	—	—	—	OutLoud!	Writer
"I'm Wit It"	2008	Lloyd	—	—	—	—	—	—	—	—	—	Lessons in Love	Writer
"Forever"	2008	Chris Brown	2	7	47	2	20	1	17	4	66	Exclusive: The Forever Edition	Backing vocals
"Love in This Club Part II" (featuring Lil Wayne and Beyoncé)	2008	Usher	18	96	—	69	—	—	—	—	7	Here I Stand	Writer
"Girl Gone Wild"	2008	Tiffany Evans	—	—	—	—	—	—	—	—	—	Tiffany Evans	Writer
"Patron Tequila" (featuring Lil Jon and Eve)	2009	Paradiso Girls	—	—	—	82	—	—	—	—	—	Non-album singles	Writer, production
"Morning After Dark" (featuring Nelly Furtado and SoShy)	2009	Timbaland	61	19	23	8	6	—	6	6	—	Shock Value II	Writer
"Passenger"	2014	Candice Glover	—	—	—	—	—	—	—	—	—	Music Speaks	Writer
"Candle in a Hurricane" (featuring Pia Toscano)	2018	Westside Cast	—	—	—	—	—	—	—	—	—	Westside: the Music	Writer
"Westside Finale"	2018	Westside Cast	—	—	—	—	—	—	—	—	—	Westside: the Music	Writer
"Wait A Minute"	2019	The Cleverlys	—	—	—	—	—	—	—	—	—	Blue	Writer
"Better"	2021	Kelly Rowland	—	—	—	—	—	—	—	—	—	K	Writer
"Let's Go" (featuring Aitch)	2022	Tion Wayne	—	—	—	—	—	— (Note: "Let's Go" did not enter the NZ Top 40 Singles Chart, but peaked at number 11 on the NZ Hot Singles Chart.)	—	30	—	TBA	Writer
