= Breaking Point (Keri Hilson song) =

Single by Keri Hilson

from the album No Boys Allowed
- Released: September 7, 2010
- Recorded: 2010; The Record Plant (Hollywood, California)
- Genre: R&B
- Length: 4:15
- Label: Mosley; Interscope
- Songwriters: Timothy Mosley; Jerome Harmon; Keri Hilson; Timothy Clayton
- Producers: Timbaland; Jerome "J-Roc" Harmon

Keri Hilson singles chronology
"Got Your Back" (2010)	"Breaking Point" (2010)	"Pretty Girl Rock" (2010)

Music video
- "Keri Hilson - Breaking Point" on YouTube

"Breaking Point" is a song performed by American recording artist Keri Hilson from her second studio album, No Boys Allowed (2010). Mosley Music Group and Interscope Records released it as the album's lead single on September 7, 2010. The song was written by Timbaland, Jerome "J-Roc" Harmon, Hilson and Timothy "Attitude" Clayton, and produced by Timbaland with assistance from Harmon. According to Hilson, "Breaking Point" was inspired by women's experiences of tolerating too much from their partner and enduring their lies. The song is about a breaking point when a woman is tired of being neglected and exploited by her partner, whose many excuses are no longer accepted.

"Breaking Point" is a mid-tempo R&B ballad that incorporates elements of pop and soul music. It features guitar, kick drum, organ, percussion and piano instrumentation. The song received generally positive reviews from music critics, who commended its empowering message and Timbaland's production. In the United States, "Breaking Point" peaked at number 44 on the Hot R&B/Hip-Hop Songs chart and bubbled under the Billboard Hot 100 at number 17. Bryan Barber directed the ballad's accompanying music video, which is primarily set at a beauty salon with Hilson and her girlfriends.

== Writing and inspiration ==
"Breaking Point" was written by Timbaland, Jerome "J-Roc" Harmon, Keri Hilson and Timothy "Attitude" Clayton. In an interview with Ian Drew of DailyFill, Hilson explained that inspiration for writing the song came from women's experiences, including "being lied to and tolerating too much" from their partner. She elaborated on its theme during a radio interview, stating: "The song is about that breaking point that every woman gets to when the excuses given by boys are no longer accepted. If you're not man enough to step to the plate, then keep it moving." The song shares its theme with "The Way You Love Me" as both songs are about "women coming to terms with what they need from a relationship". The "powerful" meaning of the two songs was personal to Hilson and she hoped that it would have the same effect on listeners. In an interview for WTAM, Hilson elaborated on "Breaking Point" and its theme:

I'm a loyal woman, and a lot of girls are. That causes us sometimes to take [bullshit] a little more than we should. I think women needed to hear – obviously I'm speaking from personal experience and that of my close friends as well – but I think other women needed to hear that you can only take so much. Eventually you're gonna reach your breaking point.

Timbaland produced "Breaking Point" with assistance from Harmon. Chris Godbey mixed the track and recorded Hilson's vocals together with Bryan "The Beard" Jones, with assistance from Ghazi Hourani; both these tasks were done at The Record Plant in Hollywood, California. Hilson arranged the recorded vocals and produced them with Veronika "V" Bozeman, who also performed background vocals. Chris Gerhinger mastered the song at Sterling Sound in New York City.

== Composition ==
"Breaking Point"
A 22-second sample of "Breaking Point" featuring cooing backup vocals, organ chords and doo-wop beats.

"Breaking Point" is a mid-tempo R&B ballad that features elements of pop and soul music. Instrumentation is provided by a guitar, kick drums, an organ, percussion and a piano. It is also backed by doo-wop beats, finger snaps and cooing backup vocals. Lyrically, the song speaks of a woman's breaking point and Hilson "voices the frustration" of women who are being neglected and exploited by men. In the chorus, she sings: "Every woman has a breaking point, y'all/ Hey, I know you know, some women can be lied to, cheated on and beat on/ Somebody know, hey, every woman has a breaking point, y'all." According to Sara D. Anderson of AOL Radio, Hilson vocally incorporates an "improvisational gospel style. MTV Buzzworthy writer Chris Ryan compared Hilson's vocals with Mary J. Blige's, particularly in Blige's cover of "I'm Going Down" (1995). Halfway through "Breaking Point", Hilson talks about "the need for each woman to reclaim her life" in a spoken-word interlude, during which she mimics Blige, according to Ken Capobianco of The Boston Globe. Hilson phrases: "Now ladies, we really should be mad at ourselves, cause see, some women just tolerate too damn much. Huh!"

== Release ==
"Breaking Point" premiered on August 18, 2010, on the urban radio station V-103 in Atlanta. It was selected as the album's lead single to showcase Hilson sans featured acts. In an interview, Hilson elaborated on the decision: "Timbaland and Polow [da Don] knew that even though I've been known for club records, guest features and collaborations, I am a true R&B lover ... [We chose the song] for many reasons ... We knew it wouldn't grow as fast or even be as big a record as some of my past [singles] ... We wanted to showcase me by myself, feature-less, and we wanted to reveal that I can sing, and really connect with my music and my message. We felt that was the best introduction to No Boys Allowed." Mosley Music Group and Interscope Records released the single via digital distribution in the United States on September 7, 2010. It was later sent to urban adult contemporary radio on October 25, 2010, while the album's second single, "Pretty Girl Rock", was classified for contemporary hit radio the same week.

== Reception ==
=== Critical reception ===
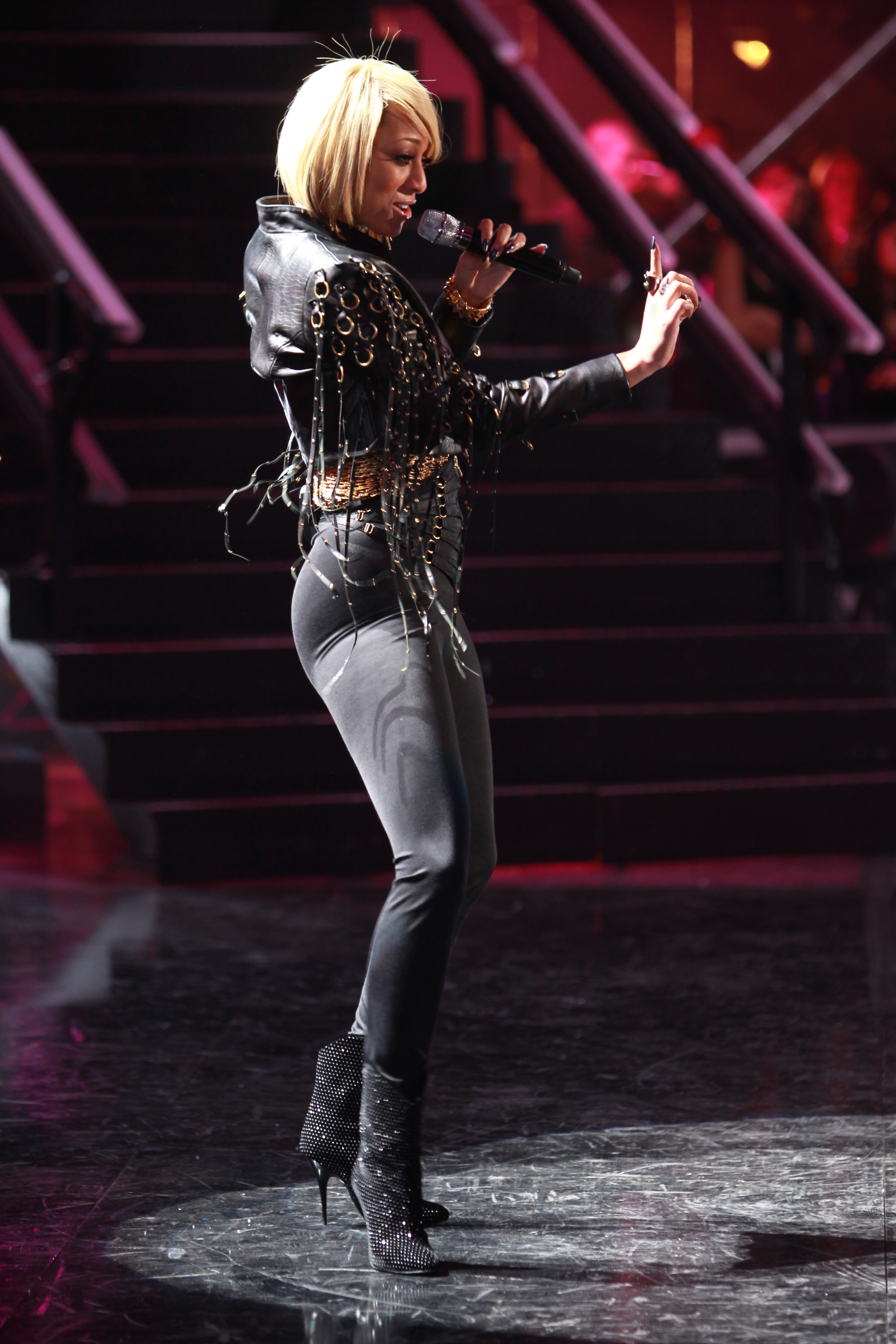
Hilson performing in 2010

"Breaking Point" received generally positive reviews from music critics. Newsday's Glenn Gamboa described it as a "gorgeous girl-group-influenced" song and commended Timbaland's "remarkably non-bleepy-bloopy production". Mariel Concepcion of Billboard observed that the song is a release for women who are "being mistreated and unappreciated" by their men, but are unable to "speak up for themselves". She viewed the single as an "empowering wake-up call [that] encourag[es] women to stop putting up with the abuse". Concepcion likened the lyrics to Melanie Fiona's "Give It to Me Right" (2009) and Beyoncé Knowles' "Why Don't You Love Me" (2010). In his review of No Boys Allowed, Matthew Horton of BBC Music remarked that the slower songs "house some of the nicer touches". Horton praised Timbaland's production throughout the album, particularly on "Breaking Point" due to its "En Vogue-y harmonies [and] oriental music box refrain". Ben Ratliff of The New York Times regarded the song as "far better" than "Pretty Girl Rock", and Los Angeles Times critic Margaret Wappler deemed it as "sticky and finessed".

Lauren Carter of Boston Herald recommended "Breaking Point" as downloadable, and Neil Miller, Jr. of UR Chicago called it one of "the finest cuts of genuine R&B out there right now". Chris Ryan of MTV Buzzworthy called the song "beautiful" and wrote, "While the music has all the squiggly, burping and buzzing percussion sound effects of your typical [Timbaland] track, it also has a lovely Prince-like melody." The Guardian's Caroline Sullivan regarded it as "deceptively sugary [and] trilling" and commented that it "does observe that some women 'tolerate too damn much', but it's easily missed". Karen Tye of The Advertiser was mixed and felt that Hilson "invokes" Knowles on "Breaking Point", writing that she "needs to work on establishing her own distinct voice". Negative reviews came from Rob Sheffield of Rolling Stone, who named it as one of the album's "failed attempts at pop crossover", and IGN's Chad Grischow, who viewed the ballad as "fed-up". Grischow criticized the production for "clumsily" attempting to mix Motown vocals with voice-box guitars and organs.

=== Chart performance ===
In the United States, "Breaking Point" debuted at number 87 on the Hot R&B/Hip-Hop Songs chart in the issue dated September 25, 2010. The following week, it rose 15 positions to number 72, and ultimately peaked at number 44 in the issue dated November 20, 2010. The song remained on the chart for a total of 18 weeks; its last appearance was in the issue dated January 22, 2011. "Breaking Point" did not enter the Billboard Hot 100, but reached number 17 on the Bubbling Under Hot 100 Singles chart in the issue dated November 27, 2010.

== Music video ==
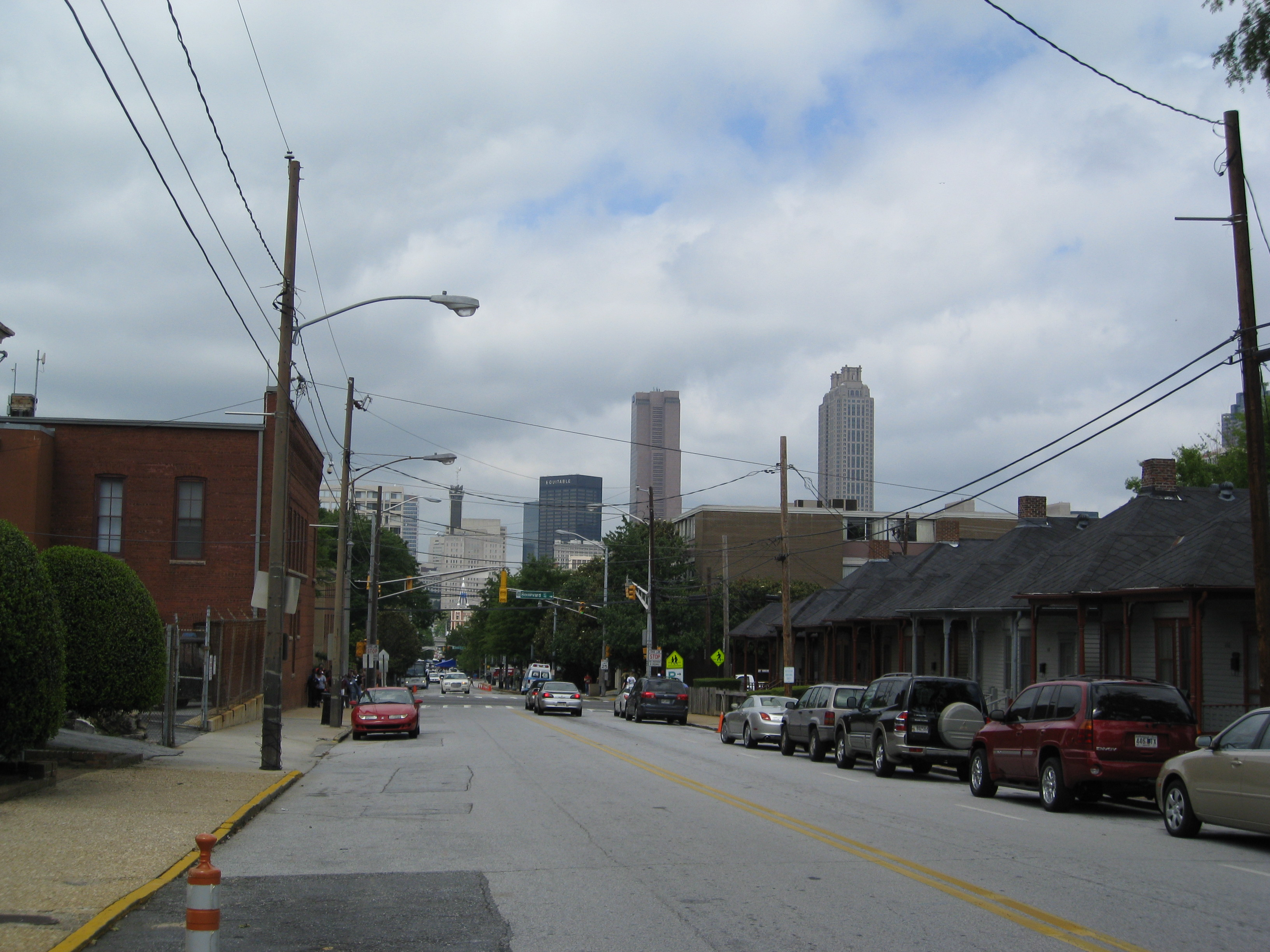
Parts of the video were filmed on Auburn Avenue in Atlanta.

The accompanying music video for "Breaking Point" was directed by Bryan Barber and shot on location in Atlanta, Georgia, in early-September 2010. Some scenes were shot on Auburn Avenue, a street in Atlanta. Director Barber noted the "Southern harmony" of the song, which he wanted to capture in the video. According to Hilson, her character in the clip realizes that she has reached her breaking point and attempts to get over what happened the night before by spending the day with her girlfriends. An unofficial version of the video originally leaked online on September 23, 2010, before the official edit premiered on October 4 on BET's 106 & Park. It was later made available for download on the iTunes Store on October 6, 2010, in the United States.

The video begins with Hilson lounging in her bed. Upset by her partner, she walks over to the closet and rips down all of his clothes. The video then cuts to Hilson sitting in a chair at a beauty salon, where she gets a new haircut and dyes her hair from black to blonde. She later begins a choreographed routine with her girlfriends, who appear to also have been mistreated by their men. The women then march down Auburn Avenue before they head home to throw their men's clothes off the balcony. The video received mixed to positive reviews. Chris Ryan of MTV Buzzworthy was positive and called it a "beautifully shot portrait of a woman on the edge of a nervous breakdown", and The Fader writer Julianne Escobedo Shepherd regarded it as an accurate representation of how women act when they are "wronged by dudes". On the other hand, Robbie Daw of Idolator deemed it tiresome, calling it a "visual snoozefest". He wrote, "[Hilson] goes to a salon, orders up Rihanna's Rated R haircut and sasses men who are wrongin' the ladies. Hey, girls—her love has a limit! But so does our patience for this [video]."

== Track listing ==
- Digital single
1. "Breaking Point" – 4:15

== Credits and personnel ==
Recording

- Recorded at The Record Plant, Hollywood, California

Personnel

- Songwriting – Timothy Mosley, Jerome Harmon, Keri Hilson, Timothy Clayton
- Production – Timbaland
- Co-production – Jerome "J-Roc" Harmon
- Vocal arrangements – Keri Hilson
- Vocal production – Keri Hilson, Veronika "V" Bozeman
- Additional background vocals – Veronika "V" Bozeman
- Recording – Chris Godbey, Bryan "The Beard" Jones
- Assistant recording – Ghazi Hourani
- Mixing – Chris Godbey
- Mastering – Chris Gerhinger

Credits are adapted from the No Boys Allowed booklet.

== Charts ==
Chart (2010)	Peak position
US Bubbling Under Hot 100 Singles (Billboard)	17
US Hot R&B/Hip-Hop Songs (Billboard)	44

== Release history ==
Country	Date	Format
United States	September 7, 2010	Digital download
United States	October 25, 2010	Urban adult contemporary
