= DailyFill =

- Website type: Internet Gossip Entertainment
- Owner: News Corporation
- Website: https://www.dailyfill.com
- Launched: December 2008
- Current status: Active

DailyFill is a celebrity news and gossip website owned by News Corp and created by their incubator Slingshot Labs. The site launched in December 2008, less than one year after the New York Post's (also owned by News Corp) Page Six shut down their own attempt at a celebrity news site. Drawing immediate comparisons to Yahoo's OMG for its text-light, photo-heavy layout, DailyFill was Twittered by Los Angeles TV and online media princess Shira Lazar and has received heavy ad exposure on the Myspace homepage.

In 2010, DailyFill became its own entity. It continues to provide snarky coverage of the entertainment world from a sarcastic perspective. The website is also the creative force behind the comedy web series Ladies With Lists which features TV hosts Erin Ashley Darling and Haely White.

== Partners ==
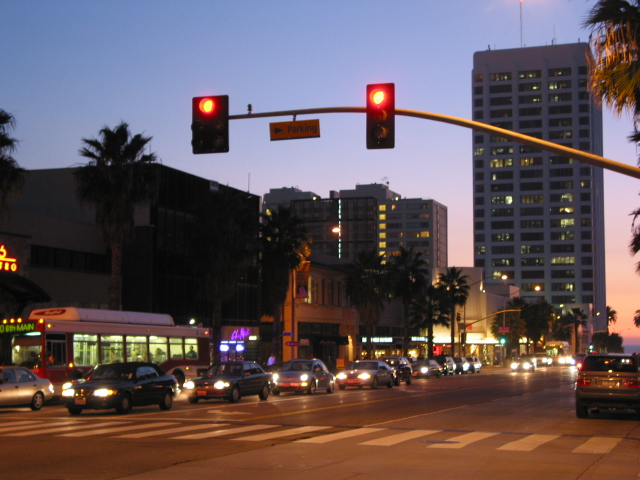
Santa Monica, where Slingshot Labs is headquartered, at sunset.

DailyFill aggregates content from numerous partner gossip sites.

- Media Take Out – “The Most Visited Black Website in the World.”
- Gossip Girls – “Celebrity and Entertainment News Leaders.”
- Page Six – The gossip section of the New York Post.
- Egotastic – “The Sexy Side of Celebrity Gossip.”
- ExpoSay - "Celebrity Photos, Fashion and Entertainment News."
