= Lose Control (Let Me Down) =

Single by Keri Hilson featuring Nelly

from the album No Boys Allowed
- Released: May 10, 2011
- Recorded: 2010
- Studio: Roc The Mic Studios, New York City
- Genre: Electro-R&B
- Length: 4:49 (album version); 3:34 (radio edit)
- Label: Interscope
- Songwriters: Mikkel Eriksen; Tor Hermansen; Ester Dean; Cornell Haynes
- Producer: StarGate

Keri Hilson singles chronology
"One Night Stand" (2011)	"Lose Control (Let Me Down)" (2011)	"Beautiful" (2017)

Nelly singles chronology
"Gone" (2011)	"Lose Control (Let Me Down)" (2011)	"The Champ" (2011)

Music video
- "Keri Hilson - Lose Control ft. Nelly" on YouTube

"Lose Control (Let Me Down)" is a song performed by American singer and songwriter Keri Hilson featuring Nelly, taken from her second studio album, No Boys Allowed (2010). The song was produced by Norwegian duo StarGate, who wrote the song with Nelly and Ester Dean. "Lose Control" was sent to rhythmic contemporary radio in the United States on May 10, 2011, as the album's fourth single.

== Composition ==
"Lose Control" is a song featuring American rapper Nelly, produced by Norwegian duo StarGate. The track opens with a keyboard riff that reverberates. As stated by Nadine Cheung of AOL Music, it features "Hilson's impeccable vocals layered over slinky synths". Karen Tye of Adelaide Now described "Lose Control" as a "B-grade version of Rihanna's "What's My Name?" (2010). Cheung also commented that on the song, Hilson "is instantly attracted to a guy in the club who knows just how to move." During the chorus, Hilson encourages her man to put his hands on her body and lose control. Nelly later delivers his "sexually charged verse" by "confidently telling his lady friend just how he rolls". Robbie Daw of Idolator compared Nelly's line "on the way you shaking your anus", to Kesha's "Cannibal" (2010). After three and a half minutes, "Lose Control" segues into the slow jam "Let Me Down".

== Critical reception ==
Andy Kellman of Allmusic said "Lose Control" was one of the album's direct hits, "despite an anus/famous rhyme from Nelly". Anthony Osei of Complex magazine wrote, "We're a little curious as to why "Lose Control" wasn't her first choice as a single. You really can't go wrong with the production/songwriting combination of StarGate and Ester Dean. Future number-one hit?" Jason Richards of NOW magazine and editors of USA Today, chose "Lose Control" as one of the stand out songs from the album. Aamir Yaqub of SoulCulture.co.uk said the song has a "Rihanna vibe to it probably owed to the production by StarGate". A writer for DesiHits described it as a dance track that was "pure and simple". Andrew Martin of Prefix Mag wrote that "It's unlikely that any new singles off Keri Hilson's No Boys Allowed will have the same chart success as "Pretty Girl Rock". But if any of them can do it, it's 'Lose Control'." Spence D. of IGN Music gave the song a mixed review, stating that it would not fall so flat if the rest of the album had "half the sassy spirit" of "Pretty Girl Rock".

== Music video ==
In late March 2011, Rap-Up reported that Hilson would be filming the music video to "Lose Control" with director Colin Tilley, who previously directed "One Night Stand" and "In the Air", her collaboration with UK rapper Chipmunk. Images from the shoot leaked online in April 2011. The video premiered on Vevo on May 20, 2011.

== Live performances ==
Hilson performed "Lose Control" live for the first time with Nelly during her visit to Australia in April 2011 for Supafest, the largest urban music festival. She also performed the song on the American version of So You Think You Can Dance on June 16, 2011. Shortly after the performance, "Kelly Hilson" became a trending topic on Twitter after the show's host Cat Deeley mispronounced her name and called her Kelly Hilson instead.

== Credits and personnel ==
- Nelly – songwriter, lead vocals
- Mikkel Eriksen, Tor Hermansen – songwriter, producer
- Keri Hilson – lead vocals
- Bryan "The Beard" Jones – recording
- Ester Dean – songwriter

== Charts ==
Chart (2011)	Peak position
Belgium (Ultratip Bubbling Under Flanders)	94
Belgium (Ultratip Bubbling Under Wallonia)	25
Netherlands (Dutch Top 40)	20
Netherlands (Single Top 100)	50
New Zealand (Recorded Music NZ)	36
Poland (Polish Airplay New)	2
Romania (UPFR)	33
Slovakia (Slovak Airplay Chart)	84
US Hot R&B/Hip-Hop Songs (Billboard)	77
US Rhythmic Airplay (Billboard)	35

== Radio add dates ==
Country	Date	Format	Label
United States	May 10, 2011	Rhythmic contemporary radio	Interscope Records
United States	June 28, 2011	Urban contemporary radio	Interscope Records
United Kingdom	September 16, 2011	Urban radio	Polydor Records
