= Gossip Girl (disambiguation) =

Gossip Girl is a 2007–2012 American television series.

Gossip Girl may also refer to:

- Gossip Girl (2021 TV series), a sequel to the 2007 series
- Gossip Girl: Acapulco, a 2013 Mexican television series based on the American television and book series.
- Gossip Girl (novel series), a series of novels by Cecily von Ziegesar; basis for the TV series
- Gossip Girl (EP), a 2009 EP by South Korean girl group Rainbow
- Gossip Girls (T-ara album), a 2014 album by South Korean girl group T-ara
- "Gossip Girls", a song by South Korean girl group Girls' Generation from their album Love & Peace

== See also ==
- Gossip Girls, now known as Gossip Center, a celebrity news and gossip website
