= Flying High (Chipmunk song) =

Single by Chipmunk

from the album Transition
- B-side: "Any Other Way"
- Released: 12 November 2010
- Recorded: 2010
- Genre: Hip hop; R&B
- Length: 3:13
- Label: Sony Music, Jive
- Songwriter: Jamaal Fyffe
- Producer: H-Money

Chipmunk singles chronology
"Until You Were Gone" (2010)	"Flying High" (2010)	"Game Over" (2010)

"Flying High" is a song British rapper Chipmunk, released as the lead single from his second studio album, Transition (2011). The music video was shot in Africa and was uploaded to YouTube on 11 November 2010. The video shows Chipmunk in a safari and African themed scene.

== Background ==
The song was announced and a 15-second sample of the song was added onto Chipmunk's official website. Harmony a.k.a. H-Money produced Flying High. On 11 November 2010, the song premiered on BBC Radio 1 and BBC Radio 1Xtra at 7pm on Zane Lowe and MistaJam's shows. Zane Lowe presented the song as the "Hottest Record in the World" on the same day.

== Track listing ==
- Digital download
1. "Flying High" – 3:13
2. "Any Other Way" – 4:10

== Chart performance ==
Despite being released midweek, the single "Flying High" debuted on the UK Singles Chart on 14 November 2010 at number 180. The next week, it climbed 108 places to number 72. On 21 November 2010, "Flying High" charted at number 19 on the UK R&B Chart. On its second week in the chart, the single fell 13 places to number 85.

Chart (2011)	Peak position
UK Hip Hop/R&B (OCC)	19
UK Singles (OCC)	72
