= Take Off (Chipmunk song) =

Single by Chipmunk featuring Trey Songz

from the album Transition
- Released: 15 July 2011
- Recorded: 2010
- Genre: R&B; hip hop
- Length: 4:03 (Album Version)
- Label: Jive Records
- Songwriter(s): Jahmaal Fyffe, Harmony Samuels
- Producer(s): Harmony "H-Money" Samuels

Chipmunk singles chronology
"In the Air" (2011)	"Take Off" (2011)	"Teardrop" (2011)

Trey Songz singles chronology
"Out of My Head" (2011)	"Take Off" (2011)	"Can't Get Enough" (2011)

Music video
- "Take Off" on YouTube

"Take Off" is a single by British pop rapper Chipmunk, released as the third single from his second studio album Transition. It is the last single to feature the stage name under Chipmunk. The song features American R&B singer Trey Songz, it was released on 15 July 2011 as a Digital download in the United Kingdom. The song's accompanying music video was released on 17 June 2011. It features appearances by both Chipmunk and Trey Songz.

== Critical reception ==
Lewis Corner of Digital Spy reviewed the song stating: "We hate to say it, but it's going to take a helluva lot more power than this to lift Chip off the ground.".

== Track listing ==
Digital download
No.	Title	Length
1.	"Take Off" (Intanatty Remix) (featuring Trey Songz)	5:55
2.	"Take Off" (Intanatty Dub) (featuring Trey Songz)	5:54
3.	"Take Off" (Cutmore Killa Club Remix) (featuring Trey Songz)	7:25
4.	"Take Off" (Cutmore Killa Club Dub) (featuring Trey Songz)	7:10
5.	"Take Off" (Champion Remix) (featuring Trey Songz)	4:16
6.	"Take Off" (Champion Dub) (featuring Trey Songz)	4:18

== Chart performance ==
Chart (2011)	Peak position
UK Hip Hop/R&B (OCC)	23
UK Singles (OCC)	84

== Release history ==
Region	Date	Format	Label
United Kingdom	15 July 2011	Digital download	Jive Records
