= Bae (Keri Hilson song) =

Single by Keri Hilson

from the album We Need to Talk: Love
- Released: March 27, 2025
- Genre: R&B
- Length: 2:56
- Label: Audible Art Club; Create Music Group
- Songwriters: Keri Hilson; Chris Dooley Jr.; Clay West; Earl Williams; Edsel Alexander III; Keith Thomas; Kortney Leveringston; Lakesha Watson; Melvin Hough II; Rivelino Raoul Wouter
- Producer: Mel & Mus

Keri Hilson singles chronology
"Beautiful" (2017)	"Bae" (2025)	"Say That" (2025)

"Bae" is a song performed by American singer and songwriter Keri Hilson, released as a single on March 27, 2025. The song serves as the first single from her third studio album, We Need to Talk: Love, and serves as the first installment of her We Need to Talk album series. It marks Hilson's first single as a lead artist since 2011's "Lose Control (Let Me Down)".

== Composition ==
"Bae" samples Hurricane Chris's 2007 single "A Bay Bay".

== Reception ==
"Bae" was met with positive reception, with Revolt declaring that the song "captures the rush of an intoxicating love." Writer Keithan Samuels from Rated R&B lauded the song for "brim[ming] with the warmth and sweetness of a love so serene." Music publication Rolling Out highlighted that the track "showcases the sultry R&B sound that first made her a star."
