= Media Take Out =

Blog-style gossip website

- Available in: English
- Owner: Fred Mwangaguhunga
- Revenue: Ads
- Website: https://mediatakeout.com
- Launched: January 2006
- Current status: Active

Media Take Out (MTO News) is an entertainment blog-style gossip website focusing primarily on African American celebrity news.

The website was founded by Fred Mwangaguhunga, a former corporate lawyer. Mwangaguhunga was born to Ugandan parents in Washington, D.C., is a graduate of John Jay College of Criminal Justice at the City University of New York, and received two degrees from Columbia University. Mwangaguhunga has been referred to as "The Mogul of Black celebrity news" by Entrepreneur.com.

Mediatakeout frequently experiences high volumes of traffic, reportedly garnering millions of unique visitors monthly.

The site sometimes garners attention on mainstream media when its stories go viral. Exclusives have been quoted by Good Morning America, Watch What Happens Live with Andy Cohen, The New York Times, BET Style, MTV News, and the "Page Six" column of the New York Post, and by radio personalities including Wendy Williams, Howard Stern, and Tom Joyner. Media Take Out has broken several stories, including Kim Kardashian's first pregnancy, Remy Ma's criminal charges and Michael Jordan's divorce.
