= Transition (Chipmunk album) =

Studio album by Chipmunk
- Released: 15 April 2011
- Recorded: The Black Rooms (Los Angeles, California); Titanium Music Studios (London, England); The Record Plant (Los Angeles, California); MSM Studios (London, England); The Boom Boom Rooms (Los Angeles, California)
- Genres: Hip hop; R&B
- Length: 50:28
- Labels: Jive; Sony Music
- Producers: Harmony "H-Money" Samuels (also exec.), Parker, Dready, Elliott "E-Man", Fyffe, Claybeat, Jahmaal Fyffe (exec.)

Chipmunk chronology
I Am Chipmunk (2009)	Transition (2011)	League of My Own II (2017)

Singles from Transition
- 1. "Flying High" Released: 12 November 2010; 2. "Champion" Released: 6 February 2011; 3. "In the Air" Released: 13 March 2011; 4. "Take Off" Released: 17 June 2011

Transition is the second studio album by British rapper Chipmunk. It was released on 15 April 2011 by Jive Records in the United Kingdom. It is his last album to be released under the stage name Chipmunk. The album debuted at number 10 in the United Kingdom, with first-week sales of 9,445 copies.

== Background ==
While discussing Transition, Chipmunk said, "It kinda represents the growth in me as a person since my last album, so the sound has matured as well as I have and that’s the main thing for me with the record - I just wanted the sound, the sound and the feel of the album to feel… I feel like a granddad but you know, just more mature than my first album, you know life’s changed." The album features American artists Keri Hilson, Chris Brown, Trey Songz, Kalenna Harper from Diddy – Dirty Money, Jamaican dancehall musician Mavado and British rapper Wretch 32. In late 2010, the second single off Transition, "Champion" had leaked onto the Internet. In an interview with BBC Newsbeat, Chipmunk said: "When it [the track] leaked, I was looking at the sky asking, 'God, why?’ I just didn't understand. The amount of thought process that went into that track, the amount of battles we had for that track."

== Singles ==
"Flying High" was a promotional single released from the album. It was released on 12 November 2010 for digital download. Its highest charting position on the UK Singles Chart is number 72. "Champion" was the second single released from the album, and features vocals from American singer Chris Brown and was released on 6 February 2011. It peaked at number two on the UK Singles Chart. The third single released from the album - on 11 April 2011 - was "In The Air" featuring vocals from US R&B singer/songwriter Keri Hilson, which peaked at Number 37 on the UK Singles Chart. "Every Gyal" topped the Jamaican chart and went to number 1.

== Critical reception ==
Professional ratings
Review scores
Source	Rating
AllMusic	3.5/5 stars
Daily Mirror	3/5 stars
The Guardian	3/5 stars
The Independent	2/5 stars
Metro	3/5 stars
The Observer	2/5 stars
RapReviews	8/10
Virgin Media	3/5 stars

Transition received mixed to positive reviews from most music critics. Robert Copsey of Digital Spy was positive, he commented that After dazzling us with his 'Diamond Rings' two years ago and platinum selling debut I Am Chipmunk, the one-time underground MC withdrew from the music scene after criticism came from his original fans for abandoning his roots and a non-stop promo schedule led to a bout of exhaustion. The result of his sabbatical is his aptly titled Transition LP, but does it live up to its promising name? Transition is an impressive effort that focuses as much on the lyrics as it does production - both of which are slick, on point and considered throughout. The album suffers from being two tracks too long, particularly as there is little deviance in subject matter, but it's nonetheless a significant step up from his debut that ultimately leaves us excited for his next metamorphosis. Jesal Padania of RapReviews gave a glowing review, praising the "underrated gem" for being coherent, whilst reserving special praise for the dominant producer, H-Money.

== Track listing ==
No.	Title	Writer(s)	Producer(s)	Length
1.	"Transition"	Jahmaal Fyffe, Harmony Samuels	Harmony "H-Money" Samuels	4:48
2.	"Follow My Lead" (featuring Eric B)	Fyffe, Samuels, Eric Bellinger	H-Money	3:48
3.	"Flying High"	Fyffe, Samuels	H-Money	3:13
4.	"Champion" (featuring Chris Brown)	Fyffe, Samuels, Bellinger, Chris Brown, Kevin McCall, Erika Nuri	H-Money	5:54
5.	"Foul"	Fyffe, Peter Ighile	Parker	3:16
6.	"In the Air" (featuring Keri Hilson)	Fyffe, Samuels, Bellinger	H-Money	3:56
7.	"Then and Now"	Fyffe, Karl Daniel, Jermaine Riley	Dready	4:12
8.	"White Lies" (featuring Kalenna of Diddy – Dirty Money)	Fyffe, Samuels, Deborah Joshua	H-Money	3:35
9.	"Every Gyal" (featuring Mavado)	Fyffe, Daniel, David Brooks	Dready	4:11
10.	"Take Off" (featuring Trey Songz)	Fyffe, Samuels	H-Money	4:03
11.	"Armageddon" (featuring Wretch 32)	Fyffe, Samuels, T. Parker, Jermaine Scott	H-Money	3:40
12.	"Picture Me" (featuring Ace Young)	Fyffe, Samuels, Bellinger, A. Rowe	H-Money	3:57
13.	"Pray for Me"	Fyffe, Elliott Fyffe, Clayton Morrison, Samuels, Daniel	Elliott "E-Man" Fyffe, Claybeat, H-Money	4:28

== Charts ==
Chart (2011)	Peak position
Scottish Albums Chart	13
UK Albums Chart	10
UK R&B Albums Chart	3

== Release history ==
Region	Date	Format	Label
United Kingdom	18 April 2011	CD/digital	Jive, Sony Music United Kingdom
