= One Night Stand (Keri Hilson song) =

Single by Keri Hilson featuring Chris Brown

from the album No Boys Allowed
- Released: March 8, 2011
- Recorded: 2010; New York City; Germano Studios
- Genre: R&B
- Length: 3:53
- Label: Interscope
- Songwriters: Chris Brown; Kevin McCall; Charlie Bereal
- Producer: Charlie Bereal

Keri Hilson singles chronology
| "In the Air" (2011) | "One Night Stand" (2011) | "Lose Control (Let Me Down)" (2011) |

Chris Brown singles chronology
| "My Last" (2011) | "One Night Stand" (2011) | "Beautiful People" (2011) |

Music video
- "Keri Hilson - One Night Stand ft. Chris Brown" on YouTube

"One Night Stand" is a song by American singer Keri Hilson, taken from her second studio album, No Boys Allowed (2010). It features American R&B singer Chris Brown who co-wrote the song alongside Kevin McCall and Charlie Bereal. The R&B and soul ballad was sent to radio as the third single from No Boys Allowed.

"One Night Stand" received a mixed response from critics, who praised both Hilson and Brown's vocals, but was criticized for being a "soggy duet". The song peaked at 19 on the US Hot R&B/Hip-Hop Songs becoming her fourth top 20 on the chart. An accompanying music video directed by Colin Tilley, premiered on March 24, 2011.

== Background and composition ==
"One Night Stand" was written by Chris Brown, Kevin McCall and Charlie Bereal. In February 2011, Hilson told Rap-Up magazine that she was considering choosing "One Night Stand" as the next single from No Boys Allowed, after an outpouring of fan support. She said, "My fans are really liking "One Night Stand" with Chris Brown ... I have a lot of favorites, but the fans are wanting "One Night Stand." It's going to be my urban single. Not going to be, but if we go with it, we'll go with that." The single cover was revealed on February 18, 2011, and shows Hilson wearing a pair of dark sunglasses, a sleeveless jacket and her No Boys Allowed necklace. The song was sent for urban airplay on March 8, 2011.

"One Night Stand" is a slow jam R&B and soul ballad produced by Charlie Bereal. Karen Tye from Adelaide Now said the song is a "very 90s-sounding R&B ballad", while Aamir Yaqub from Soulculture.co.uk noted that "One Night Stand" has "electric harmonies in its background vocals". Ben Ratliff from The New York Times compared the song to Brown's single "Take You Down" (2008). Editors from Rap-Up noted that in "One Night Stand", Hilson "takes first verse duties as she alluringly coaxes her man into coming over for a second rendezvous, harmonizing with [Brown] on the rich chorus before he sings about kissing his girl "from your head to your feet" and treating her like a princess." Chris Parkin of Yahoo! Music remarked that through the song, Hilson asks Brown "what he wants done."

== Critical reception ==
Mikael Wood from Entertainment Weekly suggested that Hilson should make more songs like "One Night Stand". Ken Capobianco of The Boston Globe called the song a "soggy duet" and thought it was a bad choice for No Boys Allowed. Margaret Wappler from Los Angeles Times wrote "Listening to Brown lay down a seduction track only conjures the feeling of turning around in a dark parking lot and seeing a big stranger coming up fast." Chad Grischow of IGN Music commented that though Brown's and Hilson's vocals blended well, the pair lacked chemistry.

== Music video ==
The song's music video was directed by Colin Tilley, and premiered on March 24, 2011. In the video, Brown plays the role of a mechanic. It begins with Hilson lying down with Brown on top of her as he caresses her and they clasp hands. The video then cuts to images of Hilson straddling Brown. As the song's first verse starts, however, they are in separate scenes: Hilson, sporting a black fur coat, is standing in the middle of a dark and smoky street, while Brown, in overalls and a tank top, is underneath a car in an auto garage. Midway through the clip, the two intertwine at an industrial warehouse in matching black outfits and sunglasses. A tag-team dance then ensues. After they both pirouette and dip and dive, Brown towers over Hilson and swings his arms over her as she ducks. She then raises up and swings her arms over Brown, who leans back to avoid Hilson's movements in slowed-down "bullet time" action.

== Credits and personnel ==
"One Night Stand" was recorded at the Germano Studios in New York City.

- Chris Brown – songwriter, lead vocals
- Kevin McCall – songwriter
- Charlie Bereal – songwriter, producer
- Keri Hilson – lead vocals
- Bryan "The Beard" Jones – recording

== Chart performance ==
"One Night Stand" debuted on the US Hot R&B/Hip-Hop Songs at number ninety-eight on the issue dated March 12, 2011. It has since peaked at number nineteen.

| Chart (2011) | Peak position |
|---|---|
| US Hot R&B/Hip-Hop Songs | 19 |

=== Year-end charts ===
| Chart (2011) | Rank |
|---|---|
| US Hot R&B/Hip-Hop Songs | 87 |
