= My Princess Academy =

Website

My Princess Academy was a website and same-named attendant virtual princess world that empowers girls to be a "new kind of Princess" by teaching the "4 Pillars" of being a real princess: generosity, intelligence, beauty and confidence. Created for girls ages three to seven, My Princess Academy lets girls create their own princess avatar, princess room, and play games and activities. The brand also teaches girls how to become their own kind of princesses, their best selves, defined not only by physical beauty but by inner beauty.

The website is home to the My Princess Academy Shop where parents can purchase products with unique codes that allow girls to enter special areas of the castle. Each product comes with a Virtue Saying that helps reinforce the theme of girl empowerment and helps celebrate the inner-strength in all girls.

My Princess Academy was a participant in the 2008 Macy's Thanksgiving Day Parade with a new castle float featuring the pop group, The Clique Girlz. The Castle of Dreams float is embellished with the four guiding pillars of real Princesses and includes a vivid depiction of the enchanted castle. The castle features four turrets of sparkling pink and royal purple with waving bright flags rising high above the float which is covered by over 230,000 flecks of glitter. My Princess Academy also is a participant in the 2010 Macy's Thanksgiving Day Parade, with R&B singer, Keri Hilson, performing on the float. The float made its last appearance in the 2011 parade with pop-rock band, Hot Chelle Rae.

The site is owned and operated by Almar Sales Company of New York, a wholesaler of beauty and hair accessories under brands including "Expression", "Princess Expressions", "Style Essentials", "Simply Sweet", "Bath Buddies" and under license, "French Toast", "Bratz", "ELLE" and "ELLE Girl", and "Suave Value". The gaming site was primarily flash-based as of 2010 and is credited to agency The Buddy Group of Irvine and San Francisco, California, while the sales site is credited to BlueSwitch.

The Washington D.C. affiliate of the US Public Interest Research Group claims in a November 23, 2010 statement that an accessory "manufactured by Almar Sales and available in local K-Mart stores contains 87 ppm lead." Almar responded in press release of the same date that the "product in question, PRINCESS TIARA AND JEWELRY SET, meets United States Consumer Product Safety Improvement Act of 2008 regulations."
