= The Way You Love Me (Keri Hilson song) =

Song performed by Keri Hilson, Rick Ross

Song by Keri Hilson featuring Rick Ross

from the album No Boys Allowed
- Released: November 7, 2010
- Recorded: 2010
- Genre: R&B; dance-pop
- Length: 4:39
- Label: Mosely; Zone 4; Interscope
- Songwriters: Stanley Benton; India Boodram; Paul Dawson; Keri Hilson; Kesia Hollins; Jazmyn Michel; William Roberts
- Producers: Polow da Don; Hollywood Hot Sauce

Music video
- "Keri Hilson - The Way You Love Me ft. Rick Ross" on YouTube

"The Way You Love Me" is a song recorded by American R&B singer-songwriter Keri Hilson featuring rapper Rick Ross from the former's second studio album No Boys Allowed (2010). It was written by Stanley Benton, India Boodram, Paul Dawson, Hilson, Kesia Hollins, Jazmyn Michel as well as William Roberts, and was produced by Polow da Don. "The Way You Love Me" surfaced online on November 7, 2010; its explicit lyrics fueled controversy, with music critics accusing the singer of swerving into a racy lane. However, Hilson clarified in several interviews that the song was not just sexual but also had a message for empowerment of women. She added that "The Way You Love Me" was not a song "meant for children".

For the release of No Boys Allowed in December 2010, "The Way You Love Me" was re-recorded as a clean version with some lyrical modifications including the omission of the word "fuck" in several places. The song, described as a reflection of Hilson's wilder side, is an R&B–dance-pop song consisting of electro and rock music influences. The lyrics for "The Way You Love Me" are about a woman in a committed relationship, whose sexual desire for her lover leads her to openly and explicitly describe her feelings for him. It features rough and aggressive vocals by Hilson. The clean version of the song was generally well received by music critics who called it raunchy, and praised how the intense vocal delivery of Hilson matched effectively with the rapid pace and heavy beat of the song. Several of them also chose it as a stand-out track from No Boys Allowed.

The song's accompanying music video was created as a mini-movie, and was directed by Laurieann Gibson. It features cameo appearances from JoJo, Faith Evans, Dawn Richard, Columbus Short and Polow Da Don. After its premiere on November 28, 2010, on a hip-hop site WorldStarHipHop.com, it received negative criticism from critics because of the limited amount of clothing Hilson wore in the video. Some critics also stated that certain scenes of the video nearly resembled those of a pornography movie. Hilson told Hot 97's Angie Martinez, that she would not be making any apologies for the explicit lyrics as well as the provocative video. Additionally, in an interview with celebrity blogger Perez Hilton, she defended the clip calling the video "racy" but in line with the perspective of her album. She also firmly stated that she would not allow other people or the media to dictate what she can and cannot do.

== Background ==
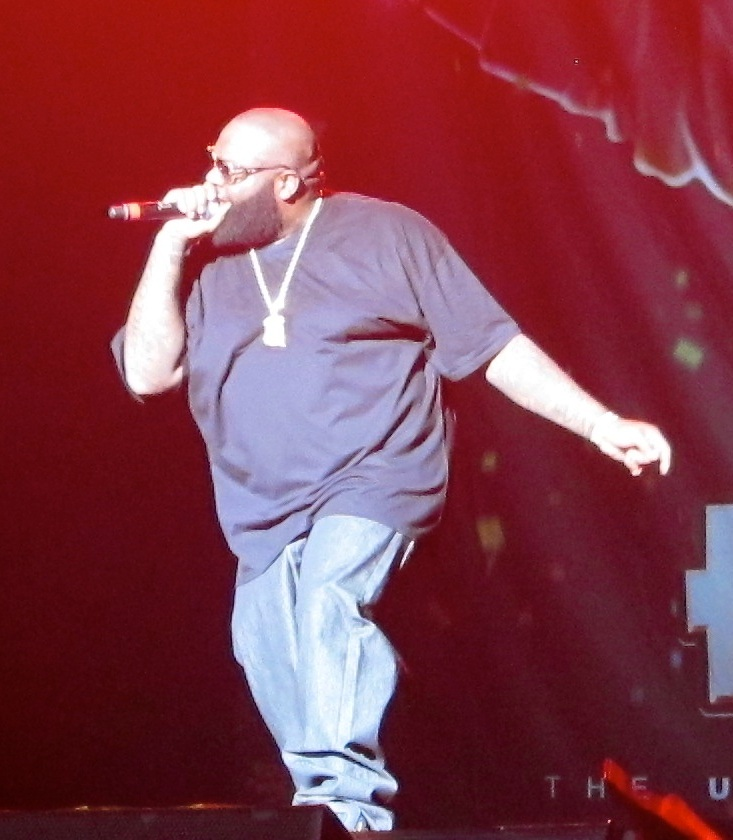
Ross performing in 2011

"The Way You Love Me" was written by Stanley Benton, India Boodram, Paul Dawson, Hilson, Kesia Hollins, Jazmyn Michel, William Roberts and was produced by Polow da Don and Hollywood Hot Sauce. The song features additional vocals from rapper Rick Ross. Before the release No Boys Allowed, "The Way You Love Me" leaked online on November 7, 2010, and a music video was filmed for it. Both received much coverage by several media outlets who deemed the lyrics as explicit and the video as provocative because of the limited amount of clothing Hilson wore in it. On the unedited version of "The Way You Love Me" Hilson uses more sexually explicit phrasing and repeatedly uses the word "fuck".

In December 2010, Keri confirmed a clean version of the song would be included on her album. Some lyrical modifications were made. The line "I got the kind of pussy that'll keep you out the streets" was replaced by "I got the kind of lovin' that'll keep you out the streets", and the word "fuck" was replaced with the word "thug", while in others it was removed altogether. Ross told Jason Rodriguez of MTV News: "When I got the record, I most definitely knew she was going to another level and I was excited for [Hilson]. I love to see the creative side. She's a sexy female and I think she showed that. When I think of Janet Jackson when I was coming up and she was doing her Control thing, I loved it. So if that's the feeling that young people [are getting] or whoever is feeling the music, if that's the inspiration they get, I think it's dope."

== Composition ==
"The Way You Love Me" is an R&B and dance-pop song which displays influences of electro, and rock music. It features a "squealing" synth, a banging fast-paced beat, screaming, rough as well as at times hoarse vocals and blaring sonics. According to the staff members of Idolator, the beat in the background is augmented by hand-claps similar to that of "Single Ladies (Put a Ring on It)" (2008) by Beyoncé Knowles, most noticeable toward the end. According to a press release by Interscope Records, the song's lyrics make reference to a "raw infectious club-thumping message to female empowerment" and about being in a committed relationship. She further said the sentiment reflected in the song is "exactly what her girls are apt to shout behind closed doors" and that the lyrics are meant to reflect a woman's many moods and shifting desires: "I write from a female perspective, but I'm also telling men what women are really thinking and feeling about them. I don't want to be held and caressed every night. I'm talking about one man in the relationship. I'm not talking about being a slut and a whore."

"The Way You Love Me"
A 28-second sample of "The Way You Love Me", featuring Hilson's hoarse vocals. The song has been criticized for its explicit lyrics.

As stated by Scott Shetler of AOL Radio and Matthew Horton of BBC, the song features an aggressive tone, and dizzying percussion and electro elements create a "frenzied pace that Hilson matches with an intense vocal delivery." During the bridge and the chorus, she utters gasps and groans, like 'oohs and aahs' while singing the lyrics. As the first verse begins, Hilson sings: "Ooh ahh, baby don't stop / You know how I like it Daddy when you hit the spot / Ooh ahh, baby don't stop / Imma take control when I climb up on top". As the song progresses, Hilson sings that she is "so good, I'll make you think the bed is my workplace [...] Yeah, it's me, that's where you wanna be / I got the kind of pussy that'll keep you out the streets" just before Ross's verse begins, seemingly summing up the image Hilson is going for: "She looks like an angel, but she's sexy as hell." As a whole, the lyrical arrangements are about sexual desire and not holding back.

== Critical reception ==
The clean version of "The Way You Love Me" garnered generally positive reviews from music critics who noted the effective melding of the intense vocal delivery of Hilson with the rapid pace and banging beat of the song. Caroline Sullivan of The Guardian said that all the five songs Hilson penned for No Boys Allowed, with the exception of the "frantic electronic firework 'The Way You Love Me', are too featureless to make an impression." Ben Hatliff of The New York Times commented that Hilson "gets a certain energy out of bossiness" on "The Way You Love Me" which according to him, goes far for a mainstream female singer in its boasting and sexual hunger. He also added that "it sometimes seems as if it were not a man at all she wants to boss around but Rihanna." Spence D. of IGN Music commented that Hilson moves "to a gritted-teeth half-rapped, half-sung approach" for "The Way You Love Me". He went on complimenting the heavy beat of the song which according to him, matches the "shouted vocals" of the singer on the song. Andy Kellman of Allmusic called "The Way You Love Me" the most emblematic track on No Boys Allowed. He praised the line "I got the kinda lovin' that'll keep you off the streets" and describing the song as rowdy and sexually direct, he concluded that it could be ideal for "the soundtrack to a straight-to-DVD Showgirls sequel."

Glenn Gamboa of Newsday found that Hilson gets incredibly riled up on "The Way You Love Me". Rob Sheffield chose "The Way You Love Me" as one of the high points that are worth digging out and called its content "electro-porn." Mikael Wood of Entertainment Weekly called the song a "raunchy" one. Chris Parkin Yahoo! Music commented that the "fantastic banger 'The Way you Love Me' [...], [a] filthy song, that makes like the oversexed, doolally cousin of Beyoncé Knowles' "Crazy in Love" (2003). Idolator's staff members described "The Way you Love Me" as a "pretty much the definition of down-and-dirty, adequately conveying a sexual energy perfect for, shall we say, a 'particular' type of dancing." They also said that vocals of Hilson sound "less like it was recorded during the throes of passion and more like someone just cut her off on the freeway". However, they ended up saying that the song works. Neil Miller, Jr. of UR Chicago called "The Way You Love Me" an undeniable standout on the record thanks to its "serious bass to rattle your trunk, some tweaked out synth stabs, and Hilson's bad bitch attitude." By contrast, Eric Henderson of Slant Magazine said that it seems that Hilson has begun trusting her ability "to thrust her hips toward recoiling cameras more than she believes in the power of her vocal track."

=== Controversy ===
The unedited version of "The Way You Love Me" received very negative reception from music critics. The song has come under severe condemnation for its explicit lyrics, particularly the lines "Fuck me, fuck me" and "I got the kinda pussy that'll keep you out the streets". Critics accused the singer of swerving into a racy lane just for page views and album sales for No Boys Allowed. However, she insisted that she "was setting the record straight." In an interview with Hot 97's Angie Martinez, Hilson stated firmly that she would not apologize for the explicit lyrics or the provocative video:

I'm just saying what women really think and feel and if I'm gonna be honest about myself, I have to show that side of myself. You can't have a song talking about what it's talking about and not show a little more. It's a love story really. Even though it's gotten crazy, crazy, crazy bad reviews, it's also gotten some great reviews from women who respect it and women who did feel empowered by it. So that, to me, overshadowed the ones that didn't understand it. I feel good. Look, sometimes, this is what we want. If I'm in a room and I'm writing from a girl's perspective, I may be a small percentage of a freak, but I am a freak! There's a time to be that. If you're being real with yourself—I'm not talking about giving it to everybody—I'm in a relationship and I'm saying look, tonight, I don't want to caress. I want you to fuck me tonight! I believe in artistry and interpretation. Whatever repercussions come, I'm willing to be on that chopping block for entertainment's sake.

— Keri Hilson,

Hilson later told Jocelyn Vena of MTV News that she was indeed a little bit surprised by the reaction she was getting concerning "The Way You Love Me". She clarified that the song was not just sexual: "In that record I'm talking about one guy, I'm talking about one night and this is what I want on this one night, and I'm not afraid to say it. Not just sexual, I just mean whatever—open your mouth. That's empowering to me. That's what the song is about." In an interview with Perez Hilton, Hilson said that she cannot allow other people or the media to dictate what she can and what cannot do. She also dismissed the negative reviews, because she knew some women were "empowered" by its message. She added that listeners have to be fearless and stand for what they believe in and concluded by saying that "The Way You Love Me" is not meant for children.

== Music video ==
A scantily dressed Hilson shown licking a metal door, one of the provocative scenes of the music video.

The music video for "The Way You Love Me", a mini-movie of about seven minutes long, was shot in Los Angeles during October 2010 and was directed by Laurieann Gibson. It premiered on November 28, 2010, on a hip-hop site, WorldStarHipHop.com. It also features cameo appearances from JoJo, Faith Evans, Dawn Richard, Columbus Short and Polow Da Don. According to Rap-Up, "[Hilson and her girls] work their charm on the boys, including Rick Ross, Columbus Short, and Polow Da Don." In the video, Hilson plays "femme fatale B.B.". The video was released to iTunes Stores on December 7, 2010.

=== Synopsis ===
The video begins in a room with a man named Fuzz (Polow da Don) telling B.B. (Hilson) and her gun-slinging women crew consisting of Boots (JoJo), Danja (Evans), and Money (Dawn Richard) about bringing in Hilson's boyfriend into custody. After Hilson assures Jammal that she can handle it, the song begins and Hilson and her crew are seen wearing black bikinis as they dance seductively to the song's chorus and first verse. Hilson and her crew are back in the room preparing themselves with scenes of Hilson grinding against a large vault door. As the song moves to the pre-chorus, Hilson and her crew are shown at a party, mingling with the male guests and handing them drinks. As Ross' verse begins, he, Short and da Don are shown at the party as Hilson's crew grind themselves around them and Hilson kisses Short's head. The song pauses and Hilson and her crew move into a room with Polow da Don, Short, and Ross sitting in chair with other men in the background. Unexpectedly, her crew all pull out their guns. Short (who has turned out to be Hilson's target) is able to respond almost immediately by having his men pull out their guns. Seeing they are evenly matched, Short agrees to let Hilson take him into custody, with Hilson removing her top and locking them both in handcuffs. The two walk upstairs, where Short pushes Hilson against the wall and they kiss on the stairway. The video ends with Short following Hilson upstairs while the words "To be continued..." appear on the screen.

=== Critical reception ===
Music critics universally criticized the video because of the limited amount of clothing Hilson wore in it. In an interview with gossip hound Perez Hilton, Hilson defended the clip, calling the video "racy" but in line with the perspective of her album: "If you put it in context with my album, my album is called No Boys Allowed but really it means no bullshit allowed. In this album, I was screaming in a room — just like I was screaming in the song — I was screaming in a room with all my girlfriends, yelling all the shit we really say." Rebecca Thomas of MTV News wrote: "A platinum-blond Keri gyrates, thrusts, licks and gets (way) low as she laces the song with enough saucy language and expletives to make your favorite rapper blush." while Jocelyn Vena the same news division of MTV commented that even though there are several cameo appearances in the mini-move, it is ultimately Hilson's "scantily clad popping and locking that has everyone buzzing." Eric Henderson of Slant Magazine called the video "overproduced and under-clothed."

Mariel Concepcion of Billboard wrote that she first saw the video for "The Way You Love Me", it seemed like Hilson was trying a bit hard to her. However, part of her could appreciate that Hilson does what she wants and that she is confident enough to do it. Concepcion further stated: "Then I watched the above interview she did with Perez Hilton, and it made me respect her even more. She stood her ground and made no excuses for her words or her visuals, and I can dig that." Niki A. M. of Vibe wrote that Hilson "made quite tails wag with her titillating video" and that "men reeled over the scantily clad vixen gyrating and shouting sexplicit phrases like "fuck me" while females seethed in disappointment over her crotch shots that went viral just days ago." Becky Bain, writing for Idolator, stated that "the stilted dialog between Hilson and Columbus Short near the end of the mini-movie as well as the former's delivery makes the scene come off like the beginning of a porn movie, and unsurprisingly, the scene ends much like a porn movie."
