= We Need to Talk (Keri Hilson album) =

Studio album by Keri Hilson
- Released: April 18, 2025 (Love); September 12, 2025 (Drama); March 20, 2026 (Redemption)
- Length: 65:29 (total)
- Labels: Audible Art Club; Create
- Producers: Aljamaal Jones; Alphonso Crawford; Andre Harris; Anthony R. Smith; Blac Elvis; Brandon Sewell; Candice Nelson; Corey Dennard; Danja; Darhyl Camper Jr.; Donut; James Hardnett; Keri Hilson; Kevin McCall; Kevin Randolph; Kwame Buchanan; Mansur Zafr; Marcella Araica; Marshall Thomas; Mel & Mus; Monte Booker; Needlz; Polow da Don; Ryan Leslie; Sean Chavis; Sylvester Stewert; Tec Beatz; Todd Thomas; Walter Millsap

Keri Hilson chronology
No Boys Allowed (2010)	We Need to Talk (2025)

Singles from We Need to Talk: Love
- 1. "Bae" Released: March 27, 2025; 2. "Say That" Released: April 21, 2025

Singles from We Need to Talk: Drama
- 1. "Again" Released: November 5, 2025

Singles from We Need to Talk: Redemption
- 1. "XO - My Gift Interlude" Released: March 20, 2026

We Need to Talk is the third studio album by American singer and songwriter Keri Hilson. The nine-track Love edition of the album was released on April 18, 2025, by Audible Art Club and Create Music Group. It is Hilson's first music release in 15 years since 2010's No Boys Allowed and her first independent release. The album was preceded by the single "Bae". The Drama edition of the album, which included six additional tracks, was released on September 12, 2025 and included the overall third single "Again". Finally, the Redemption edition of the album was released on March 20, 2026, with five additional tracks.

== Background ==
As early as 2011, Hilson had shared that she had been working on a third album, but no release occurred. In 2016, a press release announced that the album would be called L.I.A.R and would be preceded by a single called "Again". Hilson said the press release was only partly correct, and that the album was not yet ready for release, but that there was a song on it called "Again". In a 2016 Billboard article celebrating the success of their production "Oui" for Jeremih, producers Needlz & Donut teased an "80s-infused" potential single for a forthcoming Hilson album, which was subsequently shelved.

In March 2025, Hilson posted a series of videos on Instagram, opining on her return to the music industry, "I just don't want to put my life or my art in the hands of people who don't give a fuck about me [...] The thing is, I don’t fear being human — I love being human in my own hands. I fear being human in their hands [...] I’d love nothing more than to release this incredible music I've been 'sitting on. There have been so many blockages I have constantly fought myself to not directly speak about". Upon the announcement of We Need to Talk's imminent release and tracklisting, Hilson shared, "I have music to last for a very long time. The hardest thing was figuring out what kind of projects I want to put out after this. I'm inspired by different stuff every couple of years. But I got plenty of music to work with in the near future. I expect to flood the market. That's what I want to do."

The album was released by Hilson's own label Audible Art Club, in partnership with Create Music Group. Two additional parts of the album followed thereafter: We Need to Talk: Drama and We Need to Talk: Redemption.

== Promotion ==
=== Singles ===
On March 27, 2025, Hilson released the album's first single, "Bae". She announced the album title and tracklist on the same day. The single samples Hurricane Chris's 2007 single "A Bay Bay". The album's second single, "Say That", was released on April 21, 2025, accompanied by an official visualizer. On August 13, Hilson released the music video for the album track "Searchin" featuring Method Man.

After the release of the second part of the album, We Need to Talk: Drama, Hilson released the single "Again", on November 5, 2025. An official music video, directed by Tamara Bass, was released the same day.

=== Interviews ===
On April 9, 2025, Hilson appeared on The Breakfast Club to discuss her new album and her return to the music industry.

== Track listing ==
Credits adapted from Tidal.

Love
No.	Title	Writer(s)	Producer(s)	Length
1.	"Grateful" (Intro)	Keri Hilson	Aljamaal Jones; Alphonso Crawford	1:05
2.	"Naked (Love)"	Hilson; Tiffany Fred	Nathaniel "Danja" Hills	4:15
3.	"Searchin" (featuring Method Man)	Christopher Wallace; Clifford Smith Jr.; Jason Phillips; Hilson; Sean Combs; Steven Aaron Jordan; Timothy Thomas; Theron Thomas; Trevor Smith	Danja	4:15
4.	"Somethin (Bout U)"	Jones; Hilson; Fred	Donut; Kevin Randolph; Needlz	6:13
5.	"Bae"	Chris Dooley Jr.; Clay West; Earl Williams; Edsel Alexander III; Hilson; Kortney Leveringston; Lakesha Watson	Mel & Mus	2:56
6.	"Scream"	Hilson; Fred	Jones; Mansur	4:45
7.	"Whatever"	Bryan Sledge; Chris Brown; Durrell Babbs; Joseph A. Bereal; Robert Allen	Jones; Blac Elvis; Kevin McCall; Monte Booker	3:37
8.	"Weigh Me Down"	Brittany Coney; Denisia Andrews; Hilson; Kyle Coleman; Ramir Vincent	Brandon Sewell	3:18
9.	"Say That"	Jaquetta Singleton; Hilson	Dre Harris	2:58
Total length:				33:22

Drama
No.	Title	Writer(s)	Producer(s)	Length
1.	"Drama" (Interlude)	Keri Hilson		0:57
2.	"Bitches (Concerned)"	Hilson	Darhyl Camper Jr.	1:27
3.	"Sorry (Fess Up)"	Hilson; Samuel Jean	Camper	1:23
4.	"1 Hunnit" (featuring Young Thug and Pastor Troy)	Jeffery L. Williams; Hilson; Micah L. Troy; Theron Thomas; Timothy Thomas	Polow da Don; Marcella Araica; Danja	4:43
5.	"The Hard Way"	Atia Chade Boggs; Hilson; Timothy Clayton	Polow da Don	2:06
6.	"Again"	Hilson; Theron Thomas; Timothy Thomas	Jones; Corey Dennard; James Hardnett; Kwame Buchanan; Marshall Thomas; Sean Chavis	3:44
Total length:				47:42

Redemption
No.	Title	Writer(s)	Producer(s)	Length
1.	"Redemption" (Intro)	Keri Hilson	Hilson	0:31
2.	"Who"	Hilson	Polow Da Don; A. Jones; Crawford; Anthony R. Smith	4:00
3.	"XO - My Gift Interlude"	Hilson; Candice Nelson; Balewa Muhammad	Candice Nelson; Walter Millsap III; Blac Elvis; A. Jones	4:54
4.	"Lovin U - My Faith Interlude"	Hilson	Ryan Leslie	5:17
5.	"Thankful"	Hilson; Sylvester Stewart; Todd Thomas	Sylvester Stewart; Todd Thomas; Blac Elvis; A. Jones; Theron Thomas	3:05
Total length:				65:29

Notes

- ^{^[a]} signifies an additional producer

Sample credits

- "Searchin" contains a sample of "Victory", as performed by Puff Daddy, Notorious B.I.G and Busta Rhymes.
- "Bae" contains a sample of "A Bay Bay", as performed by Hurricane Chris.

== Release history ==
Release history
Initial release date	Format	Edition	Label	Ref.
April 18, 2025	Digital download; streaming	We Need to Talk: Love	Audible Art Club; Create Music Group	
September 12, 2025	Digital download; streaming	We Need to Talk: Drama	Audible Art Club; Create Music Group	
March 20, 2026	Digital download; streaming	We Need to Talk: Redemption	Audible Art Club; Create Music Group	
