= In the Air (Chipmunk song) =

Single by Chipmunk featuring Keri Hilson

from the album Transition
- Released: 13 March 2011
- Recorded: 2011
- Genre: R&B; hip hop
- Length: 3:56 (album version); 3:36 (radio edit)
- Label: Jive
- Songwriters: Eric Bellinger; Harmony Samuels; Keri Hilson; Jamaal Fyffe
- Producer: Harmony "H-Money" Samuels

Chipmunk singles chronology
"Pow 2011" (2011)	"In the Air" (2011)	"Take Off" (2011)

Keri Hilson singles chronology
"Pretty Girl Rock" (2010)	"In the Air" (2011)	"One Night Stand" (2011)

Music video
- "In the Air" on YouTube

"In the Air" is a single by British pop rapper Chipmunk, released as the second single from his second studio album Transition (2011). The song features American R&B singer Keri Hilson, and was released on 13 March 2011. "In the Air" followed up the rapper's hit single "Champion", featuring American R&B singer Chris Brown, which peaked at number 2 in the UK Singles Chart.

== Background ==
Speaking in April 2011 to noted UK urban writer Pete Lewis – assistant editor of Blues & Soul – Chipmunk described how the single came about: "I've had a love for Keri Hilson since her first album. I feel she is an amazing artist, and an amazing songwriter – plus her swag is on Level Infinity! And, though she was originally meant to be on a different track, when she came to the studio and heard 'In The Air' she straightaway said that was the one she wanted to be a part of!... So we made it HAPPEN! And to me the song represents like the perfect balance of me keeping it credible but at the same time commercial."

== Music video ==
The song's accompanying music video was directed by Colin Tilley, who also directed Hilson's "One Night Stand" music video. The video was released on 31 March 2011. It features appearances by both Chipmunk and Hilson.

== Charts ==
Chart (2011)	Peak position
Scottish Singles Sales (Official Charts)	33
UK Singles Downloads (Official Charts)	37
UK Hip Hop/R&B (Official Charts)	13
UK Singles (Official Charts)	37

== Release history ==
Region	Date	Format
United Kingdom	6 April 2011	Digital download
United Kingdom	7 March 2011	CD single
United States	29 May 2011	CD single
