= Pretty Girl Rock =

2010 single by Keri Hilson

Single by Keri Hilson

from the album No Boys Allowed
- Released: October 12, 2010
- Recorded: 2010
- Studio: Westlake Recording (Los Angeles); Vanilla Sky (New York City)
- Genre: Pop; R&B
- Length: 4:04 (album version); 4:16 (main version); 3:47 (radio edit)
- Label: Interscope
- Songwriters: Bill Withers; Ralph MacDonald; William Salter; Shaffer Smith; Charles Harmon
- Producer: Chuck Harmony

Keri Hilson singles chronology
"Breaking Point" (2010)	"Pretty Girl Rock" (2010)	"In the Air" (2011)

Music video
- "Keri Hilson - Pretty Girl Rock" on YouTube

"Pretty Girl Rock" is a song by American singer-songwriter Keri Hilson, taken from her second studio album, No Boys Allowed (2010). It was released as the lead single internationally and was the second single from that album released in the United States. The song was written by Ne-Yo and Chuck Harmony, who also handled its production. It includes a sample of "Just the Two of Us", which was written by Bill Withers, William Salter and Ralph MacDonald. "Pretty Girl Rock" is a mid-tempo pop and R&B song that features a slinky piano and bouncy R&B beats. Lyrically, the song is a cheeky ode to self-empowerment.

Critical reception towards the song was mixed to positive. Music critics noted it as the standout track on the album, and praised its catchy production. However, critics were of disparate opinions on the song's lyrics. In the United States, "Pretty Girl Rock" peaked at number 24 on the Billboard Hot 100 chart and at number four on the Hot R&B/Hip-Hop Songs chart. The song was certified platinum by the Recording Industry Association of America (RIAA), for selling over 1,000,000 digital copies. Internationally, the song reached the top 20 in Germany and New Zealand, and the top 30 in Austria and Slovakia.

An accompanying music video for the song was directed by Joseph Kahn and features Hilson portraying an array of mostly African American female icons of the past, including Josephine Baker, Dorothy Dandridge, The Andrews Sisters, The Supremes, Donna Summer, Janet Jackson and T-Boz of the R&B girl group TLC. The video received positive response from critics and was nominated for Video of the Year at the 2011 BET Awards, and Best Dance Performance at the 2011 Soul Train Music Awards. Hilson promoted the song through live performances on various televised shows, including The Ellen DeGeneres Show and Germany's Next Topmodel, as well as in live concerts such as, the VH1 Divas Salute the Troops and the 84th Annual Macy's Thanksgiving Day Parade. A version featuring rapper Kanye West served as the albums closing track. R&B girl group RichGirl and American rapper Lil' Kim have also released their own remixes to "Pretty Girl Rock", and American rock band Parachute have covered the song.

== Background and release ==
"Pretty Girl Rock" (titled "Pretty Girls" during production) was written by Ne-Yo and Chuck Harmony, who also produced the track. It features a sample of the 1981 single "Just the Two of Us", which was written by Bill Withers, William Salter and Ralph MacDonald. It was recorded in 2010 at Westlake Recording Studios and Vanilla Sky Studios in Los Angeles, California. According to Hilson, the song was Ne-Yo's idea. She said, "I remember Ne-Yo playing it for me in the studio. I loved it as soon as I heard it!" Hilson debuted the song at the Beats By Dr. Dre concert in New York City on September 29, 2010. Later that same day, Rap-Up magazine unveiled the single cover and confirmed that it would serve as the second single from Hilson's second studio album, No Boys Allowed, following its lead single, "Breaking Point". In an interview with 4Music, Hilson explained the concept of the song:

I'm giving you an example of how I think every woman should feel about herself. No matter what anyone tells you – you're too tall, you're too short, you're too big, you're too skinny ... there's so many 'rules' to society's view of beauty. I wanted to dispel that and get rid of that. We're all beautiful in our own unique ways, you just have to find that happy place within yourself. And that's what the record's all about.

"Pretty Girl Rock" premiered online on October 4, 2010 and was then released for digital download on October 12. The song was sent for rhythmic contemporary airplay in the United States on October 19, and contemporary hit radio airplay on October 26. The official remix, featuring Kanye West, premiered online on November 23, 2010, and was later included on No Boys Allowed as the thirteenth track. An extended play, featuring three additional remixes produced by dance group Cahill, were released for digital download in the United Kingdom on January 9, 2011. On June 10, 2011, "Pretty Girl Rock" was released as a Compact Disc single containing two additional remixes, in Germany.

== Composition ==
"Pretty Girl Rock"
A sample of "Pretty Girl Rock" featuring heavy drums with slinky piano and bouncy R&B beats.

"Pretty Girl Rock" is a mid-tempo pop and R&B song, that incorporates an interpolation of "Just the Two of Us" by Grover Washington Jr. The song makes use of heavy drums and slinky piano and is built on bouncy R&B beats. Sara Anderson from AOL Radio noted that it "weaves in piano trills, prominent backbeats, ska slang 'eh's and self-awareness." According to Georgette Cline from The Boombox, the song is a "self-love anthem" that showcases Hilson's "attempt at uniting women over their shared beauty rather than the jealousy that drives them apart." Luke Gibson from Hip Hop DX noted that lyrics such as: "'Girls think I'm conceited 'cause I know I'm attractive / Don't worry about what I think, why don't you ask him?', capture the attitude of a Fabolous or Jadakiss track." Chad Grischow from IGN Music referred to "Pretty Girl Rock" as a "girl-power jam" and noted that Hilson "exudes confidence" with the lines: "Pretty as a picture / Sweet as a Swisher / Mad cuz I'm cuter than the girl that's with ya."

== Critical reception ==
"Pretty Girl Rock" received mixed to positive reviews from music critics. Andy Kellman of Allmusic, Mikael Wood of Entertainment Weekly and editors of USA Today, all considered it to be the stand out track from No Boys Allowed. Eric Henderson of Slant Magazine wrote that the song, "comes on like a cat fight, but it eventually reveals itself to be a tough-loving 'love yourself' anthem, a stately but danceable approximation of Dove's campaign for 'real beauty'". Matthew Horton of BBC Music called it a "lovely single", while Ken Capobianco of The Boston Globe called it "swaggering". Glenn Gamboa of Newsday wrote that, "Though Ne-Yo gives 'Pretty Girl Rock' an addictive sheen, it's the remix featuring some memorable verses from Kanye West that gets the point across best." Kyle Anderson of MTV Newsroom praised Hilson's "confidence and sweetness" on the song, and described the beat as "funky and sick." Editors of DesiHits described "Pretty Girl Rock" as an "upbeat and catchy track ... and we have to say the beat really rocks!."

Rob Sheffield of Rolling Stone called "Pretty Girl Rock" one of the "high points" on No Boys Allowed, describing the track as "a lighter-than-air jump-rope rhyme about how hot [Keri] is." Ben Ratliff of The New York Times wrote that "Pretty Girl Rock" was one of the tracks on the album that was "good enough to stop the overthinking comparisons" with Rihanna. He described it as "four minutes of schoolyard singsong about [Keri's] fabulousness." Becky Bain of Idolator called it a "saucy R&B number" and wrote that "the song's not too bad". Chad Grischow of IGN Music wrote that, "there are plenty of reasons to despise 'Pretty Girl Rock', but the twinkling girl-power jam is too charming and catchy to stay mad." Karen Tye of Adelaide Now described it as "catchy, sparkly pop", but also added that the song is "complete with mindless lyrics." Katie Hasty of HitFix criticized the song's lyrics for being "tacky". Hasty also mentioned that the track was intended "to empower women but fails in anti-feminist." Melinda Newman, also writing for HitFix, agreed writing that the song is "absolutely paper thin and not even remotely girl-empowering."

== Chart performance ==
In the United States, "Pretty Girl Rock" entered the US Hot R&B/Hip-Hop Songs chart at number 76 on the chart issue dated November 20, 2010, and peaked at number four on the chart issue dated February 12, 2011. The song also peaked at number 24 on the US Billboard Hot 100 chart. On June 7, 2011, "Pretty Girl Rock" was certified platinum by the Recording Industry Association of America (RIAA) for selling over 1,000,000 digital copies. In Canada, "Pretty Girl Rock" debuted and peaked at number 81 on the Canadian Hot 100. On the New Zealand Singles Chart, the song debuted at number 12 on December 27, 2010, and peaked at number 11 on January 10, 2011. It was later certified double platinum by Recorded Music NZ (RMNZ), for sales of 60,000 equivalent units.

In Ireland, "Pretty Girl Rock" debuted at number 50 on the Irish Singles Chart on January 13, 2011, and left the chart the following week. In the United Kingdom, it debuted on the UK Singles Chart at number 53 on January 22, 2011, before dropping 38 places to number 91 the following week. "Pretty Girl Rock" also charted on the UK R&B Singles Chart, where it peaked at number 17. In 2025, it was certified silver by the British Phonographic Industry (BPI), for sales of 200,000 equivalent units. On the Austrian Singles Chart, the song debuted at number 50 on June 10, 2011, and peaked at number 21 in its third week, spending a total of eight consecutive weeks on the chart. In Germany, "Pretty Girl Rock" debuted and peaked at number 14 on the German Singles Chart on June 27, 2011, and spent a total of ten consecutive weeks on the chart. "Pretty Girl Rock" entered the Slovak Airplay Chart at number 39, and peaked at number 25 the following week.

== Music video ==
"I want to display other women who felt the way I felt and they were great. Yes, they happened to be physically beautiful, but it was about much more than that. It's about the way they carry themselves, it's about the way they were groundbreaking – and that they were women. I think as women, we shy away from adversity. Everyone I chose was scrutinised for their craft, for their creativity."

— Hilson on the women she chose to portray in the video.

The music video for "Pretty Girl Rock" was directed by Joseph Kahn. Hilson told Kahn that she did not want the video to be about her, since she felt that the song was already very much about herself. During an interview with MTV News while on the set of the video, Hilson explained that in the video she does nine outfit changes because it will show "10 different eras", starting from 1920 and up until 2010, in which she portrays herself. She also said, "[The video is my] way of paying homage to groundbreaking women, strong women who were fearless and so bold and so confident that they made women feel that way ... And I hope to do the same." Kahn wanted Hilson to pay homage to some female singers in the video. He discussed about it with Hilson, who chose the singers she loved and was inspired by as a youth to appear in the video. The completed video premiered on 106 & Park on November 11, 2010.

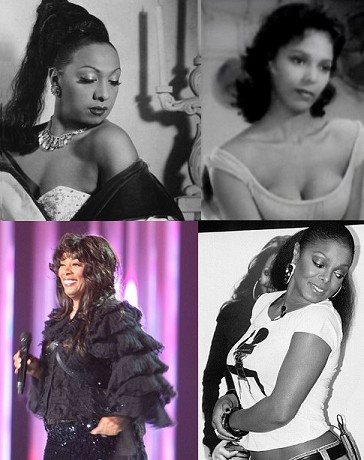
Clockwise, from top left: Josephine Baker, Dorothy Dandridge, Janet Jackson and Donna Summer.

The video opens in black-and-white and shows Hilson portraying Josephine Baker, before transforming into Dorothy Dandridge. The video then switches to color and Hilson is shown portraying lead singer Patty from the singing group The Andrews Sisters. She is then seen channeling Diana Ross as lead singer of The Supremes, before switching to Donna Summer while wearing a blue sequined mini-dress. Hilson then portrays Janet Jackson from the military-inspired "Rhythm Nation" music video. Lastly, she is shown as singer T-Boz of the R&B girl group TLC, wearing light blue silk pajamas from their "Creep" music video. Two background dancers appear as Left Eye wearing red pajamas, and Chilli wearing white pajamas. At the end of the video, Hilson is shown dressed as herself in a simple T-shirt and jeans, singing in front of a black backdrop.

Ed Easton Jr. from radio station WNOW-FM wrote that the video was "different, creative and fun" and awarded it eight out of ten stars. Billy Johnson Jr. from Yahoo! Music called the video "very nice" and wrote that Hilson's portrayal of Janet Jackson was her "best remake" in the video. Mariel Concepcion from Billboard magazine commented that the "video made her like the song [even more]." Nicole James from MTV Buzzworthy gave Hilson 100 bonus points for the authenticity of the wig she wore portraying T-Boz. Becky Bain from Idolator was unsure if the video "was [a] nice homage to the women in music who have come before her," or if Hilson was "just playing a hilarious game of dress up." The video was nominated for Video of the Year at the 2011 BET Awards, and Best Dance Performance at the 2011 Soul Train Music Awards.

== Live performances ==
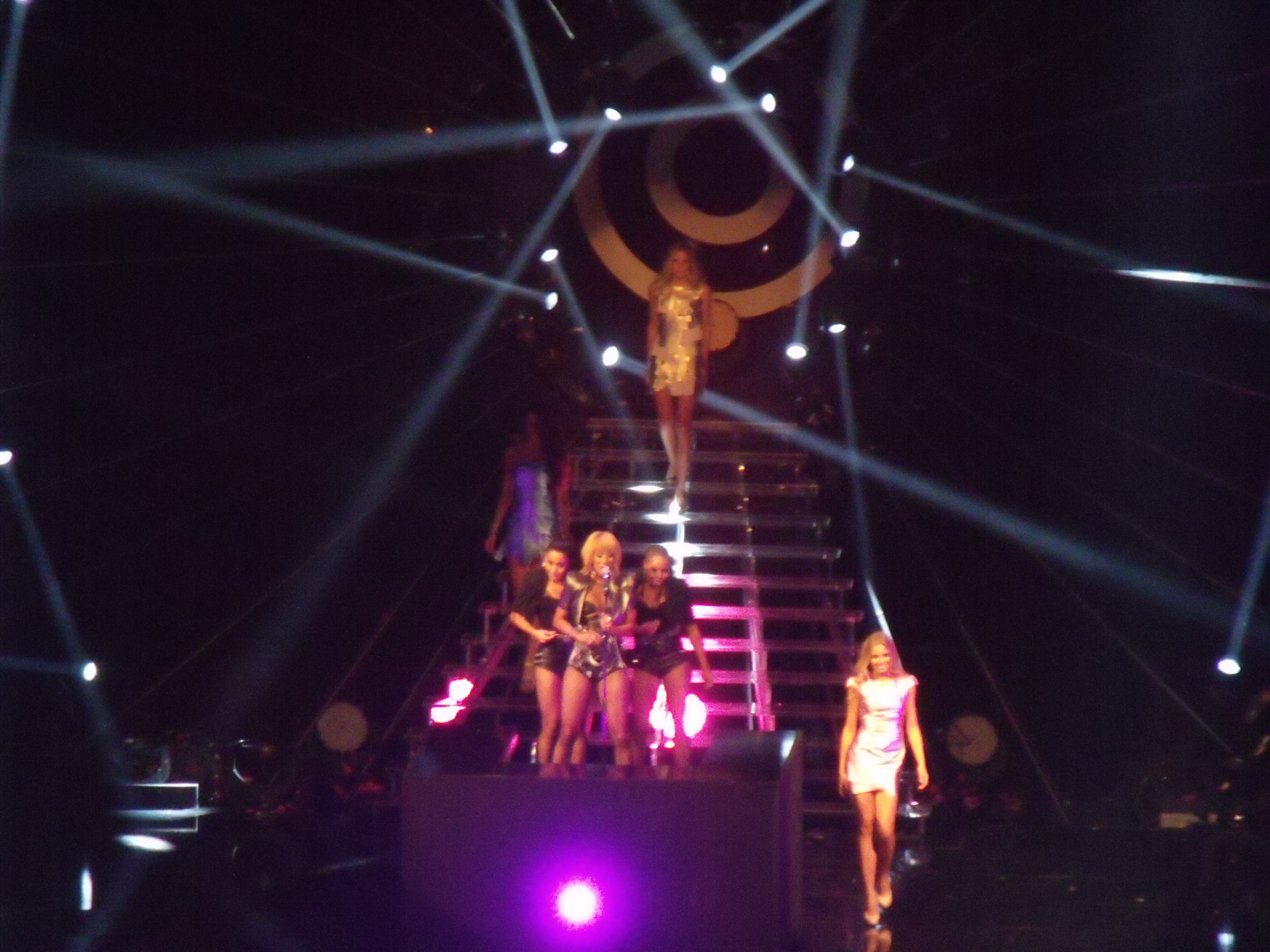
Hilson performing "Pretty Girl Rock" on Germany's Next Topmodel

On November 22, 2010, Hilson performed "Pretty Girl Rock" on The Tonight Show with Jay Leno. She later performed the song at the 84th Annual Macy's Thanksgiving Day Parade on November 25. Hilson was dressed in pink and performed the song on My Princess Academy's "Castle of Dreams" float high above a pink castle. On December 3, Hilson performed "Pretty Girl Rock" at the VH1 Divas Salute the Troops concert. She took to the stage dressed in a gold bustier with high-waisted pants and a fringe-laden jacket to perform the song in front of an audience that included members of the US Armed Forces. Hilson was backed by four female dancers, who wore stylized military jackets. Mawuse Ziegbe from MTV News wrote that, "Hilson brought her saucy, sexpot swagger to the stage." The promotion of the song continued on December 7, when she performed a remixed version of "Pretty Girl Rock" on Lopez Tonight, dressed in a silver and black leotard. Hilson later performed "Pretty Girl Rock" on December 14 on the Today Show, mixing the track with James Blunt's single "You're Beautiful". For the performance, she wore a glittery multi-colored jacket over a black blouse, skin-tight jeans and stilettos.

A day before the release of No Boys Allowed, Hilson performed the song at Billboard's first live Tastemakers event in New York City on December 20. On January 4, 2011, Hilson gave a Motown-themed performance of "Pretty Girl Rock" on the Late Show with David Letterman, by paying tribute to Diana Ross and The Supremes with her two female back-up singers. On January 25, she performed "Pretty Girl Rock" on The Ellen DeGeneres Show, also mixing Blunt's "You're Beautiful" into the song. Backed by four female dancers, Hilson wore a white button-down shirt, knee-length pants and black heels. Robbie Daw from Idolator wrote that, "Keri Hilson amped up the sex factor." In April 2011, Hilson performed "Pretty Girl Rock" during her set at the Supafest Festival in Australia, dressed in a denim jacket, black bra and cutoff shorts. On June 9, Hilson performed a remix of the song on the finale of Germany's Next Topmodel, as models strutted down the runway. The song was added to Hilson's set list on Lil Wayne's I Am Still Music Tour in North America in July 2011, in which she served as an opening act. It was also included to the set list of Hilson's first headlining European tour in October 2011.

== Remixes and cover version ==
R&B girl group RichGirl recorded their own remix to the song renamed "RichGirl Rock", which was included on their mixtape Fall in Love with RichGirl in February 2011. American rapper Lil' Kim also remixed "Pretty Girl Rock" and renamed it "Kimmy Girl" for her mixtape Black Friday in March 2011. American rock band Parachute covered the song during their Mashup Mondays session for Billboard magazine in September 2011. Jessica Letkemann of Billboard magazine wrote that the band transformed "the super self-assured R&B strut of Keri Hilson's 'Pretty Girl Rock' into a sweet, poppy acoustic rock bounce."

== Track listing ==
- Digital download
1. "Pretty Girl Rock" – 4:04
- Germany CD single
1. "Pretty Girl Rock" (Jost & Damien Radio Mix) – 3:26
2. "Pretty Girl Rock" (Main Version) (featuring Kanye West) – 4:16
- UK digital EP
1. "Pretty Girl Rock" – 4:04
2. "Pretty Girl Rock" (Cahill Radio Edit) – 3:23
3. "Pretty Girl Rock" (Cahill Dub Remix) – 5:39
4. "Pretty Girl Rock" (Cahill Club Remix) – 6:09

== Credits and personnel ==
- Kevin "KD" Davis – mixing
- Moses Gollart – assistant vocal recording engineer
- Charles "Chuck Harmony" Harmon – songwriter, producer
- Keri Hilson – additional arrangements, lead vocals
- Bryan "The Beard" Jones – vocal recording engineer
- Chang and Mike "TrakGuru" Johnson – vocal recording engineer
- Jerel Lake – assistant mixing engineer
- Sam Salter – songwriter
- Shaffer "Ne-Yo" Smith – songwriter
- Bill Withers – songwriter

== Charts ==
=== Weekly charts ===
Weekly chart performance for "Pretty Girl Rock"
Chart (2010–2011)	Peak position
Australia (ARIA)	81
Australia Urban (ARIA)	29
Austria (Ö3 Austria Top 40)	21
Canada (Canadian Hot 100)	81
Germany (GfK)	14
Ireland (IRMA)	50
New Zealand (Recorded Music NZ)	11
Slovakia (Rádio Top 100 Oficiálna)	25
Switzerland (Schweizer Hitparade)	62
UK Hip Hop/R&B (OCC)	17
UK Singles (OCC)	53
US Billboard Hot 100	24
US Hot R&B/Hip-Hop Songs (Billboard)	4
US Pop Songs (Billboard)	25
US Rhythmic Airplay (Billboard)	5

=== Year-end charts ===
Year-end chart performance for "Pretty Girl Rock"
Chart (2011)	Rank
US Billboard Hot 100	70
US Hot R&B/Hip-Hop Songs	19
US Rhythmic Songs	42

== Certifications ==
Certifications for "Pretty Girl Rock"
Region	Certification	Certified units/sales
New Zealand (RMNZ)	2× Platinum	60,000^{‡}
United Kingdom (BPI)	Silver	200,000^{‡}
United States (RIAA)	Platinum	1,000,000^{^}
^{^} Shipments figures based on certification alone.^{‡} Sales+streaming figures based on certification alone.

== Radio and release history ==
Release dates and formats for "Pretty Girl Rock"
Country	Date	Format	Label
United States	October 12, 2010	Digital download	Interscope Records
United States	October 19, 2010	Rhythmic contemporary radio	Interscope Records
United States	October 26, 2010	Contemporary hit radio	Interscope Records
Ireland	January 6, 2011	Digital download	Universal Music
Switzerland	January 7, 2011	Digital download	Universal Music
United Kingdom	January 9, 2011	Digital download, Digital Remixes EP	Polydor Records
Spain	January 17, 2011	Digital download	Universal Music
France	January 19, 2011	Digital download	Universal Music
Norway	January 19, 2011	Digital download	Universal Music
Sweden	January 24, 2011	Digital download	Universal Music
Netherlands	February 11, 2011	Digital download	Universal Music
Australia	March 25, 2011	Digital download	Universal Music
Austria	March 27, 2011	Digital EP	Universal Music
Germany	June 10, 2011	CD single	Universal Music
