= Champion (Chipmunk song) =

2011 single by Chipmunk

Single by Chipmunk featuring Chris Brown

from the album Transition and F.A.M.E.
- B-side: "Power Trip"
- Released: 6 February 2011
- Recorded: 2010
- Genre: Hip hop; R&B
- Length: 3:58 (single edit); 5:54 (album version)
- Label: Jive
- Songwriter(s): Chipmunk, Harmony Samuels, Fyffe, Chris Brown
- Producer(s): Harmony "H-Money" Samuels

Chipmunk singles chronology
"Game Over" (2010)	"Champion" (2011)	"Pow 2011" (2011)

Chris Brown singles chronology
"Look at Me Now" (2011)	"Champion" (2011)	"My Last" (2011)

Music video
- "Champion" on YouTube

"Champion" is a song by British rapper Chipmunk from his second studio album Transition (2011). It features American singer Chris Brown and was released as the second single from the album on 6 February 2011 in the United Kingdom. The song was written by Chipmunk and Chris Brown, and it was produced by Harmony Samuels. According to Chipmunk, he wants the listeners of the song to "feel like they were born a champion". The song was later added to the international deluxe edition of Brown's fourth album, F.A.M.E. (2011).

The song peaked at number 2 on the UK Singles Chart, becoming Chipmunk's second highest-charting single.

== Background ==
Speaking in April 2011 to noted UK urban writer Pete Lewis – Assistant Editor of Blues & Soul – Chipmunk shed light on the background to the song and Chris Brown's involvement: "That was definitely a big learning experience for me – not just in terms of being an artist, but in terms of life! Because, with Chris being on it, people were saying that they didn't wanna support the track before they'd even heard it! Which meant I really had to engage myself and find the inner strength to say 'Yo, I'm gonna go with this track regardless! Because I know what this song means to me, I know that it means to Chris – and if it's from the heart then it can't go wrong!"

== Critical reception ==
Robert Copsey of Digital Spy gave the song a positive review calling it: "a fist-clenching, anthemic midtempo electro-R&B stomper that ponders the glorious highs and depressive lows of fame", and gave the song 4 stars out of 5. AllMusic called the track "a fist-clenching empowering R&B stomper".

== Chart performance ==
On 10 February 2011, the song debuted at number fourteen in Ireland. In the United Kingdom, "Champion" debuted at number two on 12 February 2011. It was beaten to the top spot by a margin of less than 5% by Jessie J's "Price Tag", each having sold over 90,000 copies.

== Remix ==
The official remix of the song features a new verse by Chipmunk, Chris Brown's verse & chorus and a verse by American rapper J. Cole. The remix was released on 5 February 2011.

== Music video ==
The music video (directed by Colin Tilley) premiered on YouTube on 23 December 2010. Fellow British rapper Skepta, makes a cameo. The music video of the song's edited version premiered on YouTube on 18 March 2011.

== In popular culture ==
- The song is featured as the theme of the WWE series Tough Enough on USA Network.
- The song was featured in the tribute montage BBC made of Formula One World Champion Sebastian Vettel, when he won his second World Championship at Japan in 2011.
- The song is on the soundtrack of the 2011 football video game Madden NFL 12.

== Track listing ==
- Digital download #1
1. "Champion" (featuring Chris Brown) (Explicit Version) – 3:58
2. "Champion" (featuring Chris Brown) (Clean Version) – 3:59
- CD single / Digital download #2
1. "Champion" (featuring Chris Brown) – 3:58
2. "Power Trip" – 3:42
- Digital download – Remix #1
1. "Champion" (Ready For The Weekend Remix) – 6:00
- Digital download – Remix #2
1. "Champion" (Remix featuring Chris Brown & J. Cole) – 4:59

== Charts ==
=== Weekly charts ===
Weekly chart performance for "Champion"
Chart (2011)	Peak position
Ireland (IRMA)	12
Scotland (OCC)	2
UK Singles (OCC)	2
UK Hip Hop/R&B (OCC)	1

=== Year-end charts ===
2011 year-end chart performance for "Champion"
Chart (2011)	Position
UK Singles (OCC)	38

== Certifications ==
Certifications for "Champion"
Region	Certification	Certified units/sales
United Kingdom (BPI)	Platinum	600,000^{‡}
^{‡} Sales+streaming figures based on certification alone.

== Release history ==
Region	Date	Format
United Kingdom	6 February 2011	Digital download; CD single
Germany	1 April 2011	CD single
