= No Boys Allowed =

- Standard edition cover. Deluxe edition cover appears in color against a white or pink tinged background, depending on the region.

Studio album by Keri Hilson
- Released: December 17, 2010
- Genre: R&B
- Length: 50:24
- Labels: Mosley; Z IV; Interscope
- Producers: Arden Altino; Tha Bizness; Boi-1da; Bei Maejor; Charlie Bereal; Chuck Harmony; Danja; David Jost; Hollywood Hotsauce; J-Mizzle; Jerome "J-Roc" Harmon; Jerry Duplessis; Matthew Burnett; Ne-Yo; Polow da Don; Robin Grubert; Stargate; Timbaland

Keri Hilson chronology
In a Perfect World... (2009)	No Boys Allowed (2010)	We Need to Talk (2025)

Singles from No Boys Allowed
- 1. "Breaking Point" Released: September 7, 2010; 2. "Pretty Girl Rock" Released: October 12, 2010; 3. "One Night Stand" Released: March 8, 2011; 4. "Lose Control (Let Me Down)" Released: May 10, 2011

No Boys Allowed is the second studio album by American singer Keri Hilson. It was released on December 17, 2010, by Mosley Music Group, Zone 4, Inc. and Interscope Records. Hilson reunited with the executive producers of her previous albums, Timbaland and Polow da Don. The trio enlisted producers such as Ne-Yo, Tha Bizness, J-Roc, John Legend, StarGate, Bei Maejor and Boi-1da, among others. Meanwhile, Chris Brown, Rick Ross, Kanye West, J. Cole, Nelly and Timbaland himself, contributed guest appearances to the album. Musically, No Boys Allowed is an R&B album, which incorporates elements of pop, soul, electro and dancehall into various songs.

Upon release, the album received mixed reviews from music critics, and peaked at number 11 on the US Billboard 200, selling 102,000 copies in its first week. Although it has since sold 8,000 copies more than her debut album, In a Perfect World... (2009), it failed to match the album's peak position of number four. No Boys Allowed also debuted at number seven on the US Top R&B/Hip-Hop Albums chart and number ten on the UK R&B Albums Chart. The album's lead single, "Breaking Point", was released in the United States on September 7, 2010, and peaked at number 44 on the US Hot R&B/Hip-Hop Songs chart. The second single, "Pretty Girl Rock", was released on October 12, 2010, and peaked within the top ten on the Hot R&B/Hip-Hop Songs chart, as well as the top 15 in New Zealand. Two additional singles, "One Night Stand" and "Lose Control (Let Me Down)", were released for radio in March and May 2011, respectively.

== Recording and production ==
Following her acoustic performance of "Knock You Down" at Billboard headquarters in January 2010, Hilson told Mariel Concepcion of Billboard magazine, that she plans to start recording her second album soon and hopes to work with Robin Thicke, Lauryn Hill and Ryan Leslie. When asked how the album was coming along in June 2010, Hilson made the following comments to Rap-Up TV: "I've been in the studio with a lot of special people, a lot of big names, but a lot of talented people as well ... It's all about new inspiration that I have and just getting all the ideas that I've been collecting out, so it's time." She also confirmed reports that she's been working with Dr. Dre. In July 2010, Hilson revealed in an interview, that she has been working with Polow da Don, Tricky Stewart and Danja, who she had previously collaborated with for In a Perfect World... (2009). She also said, that the album would be released when the time is right. "We didn't want to rush this one ... I wanted it to be as organic and as emotional as the first one."

During this time, Lil' Kim told HollywoodTV, that she's been in the studio working on a collaboration with Hilson, on a song titled, "Buyou", and revealed Polow da Don produced the track. In an interview with The Boom Box, Hilson spoke of the song saying: "I wanted to talk about how it's not cool to mooch off your woman. It's not manly, it's very boy-like. I don't want to take care of my man. I do buy my own things. You are doing nothing for me, you are taking from me and that's not a good situation. Buy you a phone, buy you a car. It's like saying, come correct or don't come at all." However, "Buyou" with Lil' Kim did not make the final track listing, and was replaced with a different version of the song featuring J. Cole. In an interview, Hilson explained, "I happened to love it, [but] having all boy features kinda took precedent over that whole thing happening. However, the door is still open for a remix. In a Perfect World..., it would be [Lil'] Kim and Nicki Minaj on the same track." In August 2010, Hilson revealed in an interview with Global Grind that she did not going on any vacations for the Summer, and instead she moved to Los Angeles to work on the album with Timbaland and Polow da Don. A statement by Polow was released on Hilson's website, saying "Keri's intense focus on No Boys Allowed has been inspiring to both Timbaland and I, in and out of the studio. This will definitely be one of the best albums of 2010/2011." In November 2010, John Legend revealed in an interview with Rap-Up, that he wrote a song called, "All the Boys" for the album, and described the song as a "reminiscent of past love".

== Conception and title ==
In an interview with MTV News on March 24, 2010, Hilson revealed that her trip to Africa had heavily influenced the album's sound. She told the interviewer "Everywhere I travel, I get music from that region of the world. I've been to Nigeria, I've been to South Africa, three cities in Africa [in all]. I gather music from these regions, and African music is very drum-heavy. It was very inspiring. I'm definitely going to be using some of that inspiration." When Hilson was interviewed by Global Grind in August 2010, she explained that she was excited about the album's release, because it would be inspirational to all women, stating:

"I really wanted to do an album to tell women to be confident, no matter what their circumstances. You have to push through, don't yield at the first sign of adversity. The theme of this event is celebrating the journey and not the success. My personal journey was over 12 years long. I had to sit back and be a songwriter when my first goal was to be an artist. I know a lot of women who just have given up, so I want them to have the same tenacity and drive that men have. I really went there on this album."

When asked, by Allison Walker from Central Florida News 13, who was the inspiration behind the songs' lyrics?, Hilson replied "Many, many boys. Many, many, many boys. Even the boys in your life inspired this. I was in an imaginary clubhouse. A lot of times when I was sitting down to write, and I was in an imaginary clubhouse, you were there, Allison. My best friends. Your best friends. Our sisters, our mothers we were all sounding off and yelling at the top of our lungs everything we wish men knew about us. And, uh, so that's really what motivated a lot of the records." Although the album is called No Boys Allowed, Hilson told Lisa Binkert of Billboard magazine that "I have all male features on the album, but they're all men. Not boys ... I wanted to represent the male point of view. I'm not saying it's always good, but I want you to be honest; the same way that I'm honest about female's perspective. I wanted men to come and sound off." Hilson has stated in an interview with Perez Hilton that the album's title actually means, No Bullshit Allowed. She released a statement on her website about the title saying, "it's not about excluding men. It's more about women understanding that there comes a time in your life when you want a man. A real man. A grown up. Not a boy. And that's not a bad thing." The deluxe edition of No Boys Allowed had a slightly different album cover. The image, which is the same as the standard edition cover, appears in color against a pink tinged background.

== Music ==
Primarily an R&B album, No Boys Allowed also contains elements of pop, soul, electro and dancehall. Critics have noted the song, "Bahm Bahm (Do It Once Again)", as a reggae, dancehall track which has drawn comparisons to Rihanna. Other comparisons to Rihanna include "Lose Control/Let Me Down" to "What's My Name?", "Lie to Me" to "Love the Way You Lie" and the acoustic ballad "Hustler" to "California King Bed". "Breaking Point", which is the first single from No Boys Allowed, has lyrics that are about moving on from relationships that are not working and expecting men to step up to the plate and show women more respect and love. The song's style and sound have been compared to other artists such as Mary J. Blige and Prince. Mariel Concepcion of Billboard noted "Breaking Point" as a "reminiscent of Melanie Fiona's "Give It to Me Right" and Beyoncé's "Why Don't You Love Me".

"Pretty Girl Rock" is a mid-tempo R&B song, which incorporates an interpolation of "Just the Two of Us" by Grover Washington, Jr. When asked about the concept of the song, Hilson stated "I want everybody to feel like they can do the pretty girl rock [dance] ... It's like the hair brush in the mirror, don't hate me cause I'm beautiful, cause you are. Everybody is beautiful." "The Way You Love Me" is an upbeat song which generates influences of electro, R&B, and dance-pop. The song has been criticized for its explicit lyrics, that features the hook "Fuck me, fuck me", and the line "I got the kinda pussy that'll keep you out the streets". According to Matthew Horton of BBC Online, Hilson's smooth vocals on "Beautiful Mistake", takes you back to Michael Jackson's Thriller album. On the other hand, "Gimme What I Want" has been described as an "electro anthem", and according to Andy Kellman of Allmusic, the song is part two to both "Turnin Me On" and "Get Your Money Up". The album also includes the ballads "All the Boys", "Toy Soldier" and "One Night Stand" with Chris Brown, which has been described as a "very '90s-sounding R&B ballad."

== Release and promotion ==
In September 2010, Rap-Up magazine confirmed that No Boys Allowed would be released on November 30, 2010. However, the album's release date was rescheduled to December 21, 2010. No Boys Allowed was released in two separate editions: the standard and the deluxe, with both editions' digital releases containing the album's CD booklet. The deluxe edition also includes four bonus tracks, "Hustler", "Lie to Me", "Won't Be Long" and "Fearless", with the latter released only on iTunes.

The album's promotion began in November 2010 when Hilson appeared on the front cover of Vibe magazine. On November 7, 2010, "The Way You Love Me" premiered online. A Laurie Ann Gibson-directed mini-movie for the song was shot in Los Angeles during October and featured cameo appearances from JoJo, Faith Evans, Dawn Richard, Columbus Short and Polow Da Don. The mini-movie premiered on WorldStarHipHop.com on November 28, 2010, and was released to iTunes Stores on December 7, 2010. The video was criticized because of the song's explicit lyrics ("I got the kinda pussy that'll keep you out the streets"), and the limited amount of clothing Hilson had worn in the video. Critics accused the singer of swerving into a racy lane just for page views and album sales for No Boys Allowed. In an interview with Perez Hilton, Hilson defended the clip and said, "If you put it in context with my album, my album is called No Boys Allowed but really it means no bullshit allowed. In this album, I was screaming in a room — just like I was screaming in the song — I was screaming in a room with all my girlfriends, yelling all the shit we really say." A clean version of the song can be found on No Boys Allowed as track three. Two other songs were also released online. The Lil' Kim-assisted "Buyou" premiered on November 15, 2010. and "Toy Soldier" premiered on the Billboard website on December 13, 2010.

On November 22, 2010, Hilson performed "Pretty Girl Rock" on The Tonight Show with Jay Leno, followed by a performance of the song at the 84th Annual Macy's Thanksgiving Day Parade on November 25, 2010. She also performed the song while co-headlining the VH1 Divas Salute the Troops concert with artists like Nicki Minaj and Katy Perry on December 5, 2010, and on the Lopez Tonight show on December 7, 2010. The next day, Hilson appeared on the Chelsea Lately show to promote the album. She also appeared on The Today Show on December 14, 2010, and performed "Pretty Girl Rock". The album cover was unveiled on November 10, 2010. The official track listing was released on Amazon.com on December 6, 2010, along with snippets of the album's songs. Prior to this, photo shoots for the album were released online on December 11, 2010. On December 15, 2010, Hilson performed several of the album's songs at a listening party in her hometown of Atlanta, during the Hot 107.9 FM Christmas party.

== Singles ==
"Breaking Point" was released as the lead single in the United States on September 7, 2010. The song was produced by Timbaland and JRoc, and talks about moving on from relationships that are not working and expecting men to step up to the plate and show women more respect and love. Critics gave the song mixed to positive reviews. While Billboard magazine's Mariel Concepcion described the song as an "reminiscent of Melanie Fiona's "Give It to Me Right" and Beyoncé's "Why Don't You Love Me", Rap-Up noted the song as "vintage-sounding". It was one of Hilson's least successful singles in the United States, only reaching number forty-four on the US Hot R&B/Hip-Hop Songs chart.

"Pretty Girl Rock" premiered at the Beats By Dr. Dre concert in New York City on September 29, 2010 and released as the album's second single on October 12, 2010. The song was sent to rhythmic radio in the United States on October 19, 2010, and mainstream radio on October 26, 2010. It has reached a current peak of number six on the US Hot R&B/Hip-Hop Songs chart, and peaked at number twenty-four on the Billboard Hot 100. "Pretty Girl Rock" became Hilson's fifth top-fifteen R&B/Hip-Hop Songs hit. On December 27, 2010, the song entered the New Zealand Singles Chart at number twelve, and has since peaked at number eleven. On January 22, 2011, it debuted on the UK Singles Chart at number fifty-three and at number seventeen on the UK R&B Chart.

"One Night Stand" featuring Chris Brown, was sent to urban mainstream radio as the album's third single on March 8, 2011. In February 2011, Hilson told Rap-Up magazine that she was considering choosing "One Night Stand" as the next single from No Boys Allowed, after an outpouring of fan support. She said, "My fans are really liking 'One Night Stand' with Chris Brown ... I have a lot of favorites, but the fans are wanting 'One Night Stand.' It's going to be my urban single. Not going to be, but if we go with it, we'll go with that." The song has appeared on the US Hot R&B/Hip-Hop Songs chart at 19. "Lose Control (Let Me Down)" was sent to rhythmic radio on May 10, 2011, as the album's fourth single.

== Critical reception ==
Professional ratings
Aggregate scores
Source	Rating
Metacritic	54/100
Review scores
Source	Rating
AllMusic	2.5/5 stars
Entertainment Weekly	B−
The Guardian	2/5 stars
Los Angeles Times	2/4 stars
NOW	3/5
Rolling Stone	2.5/5 stars
Slant Magazine	2.5/5 stars
USA Today	2.5/4 stars

No Boys Allowed received mixed reviews from most music critics. At Metacritic, which assigns a normalized rating out of 100 to reviews from mainstream critics, the album received an average score of 54, based on 13 reviews, which indicates "mixed or average reviews". AllMusic writer Andy Kellman viewed the album as overproduced and commented that it "often falls flat". Ben Ratliff of The New York Times wrote that "Hilson gets a certain energy out of bossiness", but expressed a mixed response towards its production and viewed that the album lacks a "narrative". Slant Magazine's Eric Henderson gave it two-and-a-half out of five stars and commented that Hilson "misses the independence espoused by everywomen Khan and Houston and essentially says 'That's a good idea' to her reverse harem of producer-songwriters". Los Angeles Times writer Margaret Wappler commented that Hilson "is concerned with boundaries" and stated "nearly every song is cluttered with as much textural filigree as possible to distract from the absence of narcotic radio hooks". Caroline Sullivan of The Guardian noted its "conventional sex-and-love piffle" and wrote that the album "is muddled and devoid of the gutsiness the title leads us to". Rolling Stone writer Rob Sheffield called the album "hit-or-miss, with failed attempts at pop crossover (the Timbaland collabo 'Breaking Point') and sub-Rihanna reggae moves", but noted "Pretty Girl Rock" and "The Way You Love Me" as "the high points [...] worth digging out".

Mikael Wood of Entertainment Weekly wrote that "this zigzagging sophomore disc... suggests she's not quite sure where to go next", but wrote favorably the "sensual future-soul slow jams such as 'One Night Stand' and the Timbaland-produced 'Breaking Point'". Glenn Gamboa of Newsday gave it a B+ rating and complimented its "brassy hip-hop and sassy soul". Jason Richards of NOW expressed a mixed response towards its "singles choices" and commented on the prominently male production team, but found it "Impressive, then, that this boy-army, one-girl team was able to pull off a contemporary R&B album so feminine, breezy and thankfully low on ballads". USA Today's Elysa Gardner gave the album two-and-a-half out of four stars and noted "how little of her own voice comes through on this set of smart and pleasurable but mostly disposable pop-soul candy". BBC Online's Matthew Horton found its music less "ordinary" than that of her previous album and commented that "Hilson is in warm, confident voice throughout". Ken Capobianco of The Boston Globe complimented the songs concerning "finger-wagging affirmations of self", but wrote that "she never maintains this strong sense of purpose. Instead, Hilson loses focus with hookless songs the busy production can't save".

== Commercial performance ==
When speaking of her expectations for No Boys Allowed, Hilson said she hoped that she would sell more than 35,000 copies. "I would like to higher than 35k – I mean anyone would... I saw a quote where she said it's not all about the numbers and I'm not really a chart reader, I don't look at charts. It's probably what she honestly feels." The media took Hilson's comments as a response to fellow R&B singer Ciara, whose album Basic Instinct sold 37,000 copies and was followed by a statement which read almost exactly like Hilson's comments. In the end, No Boys Allowed opened on the Billboard 200 at number eleven with 102,000 copies sold, and although it sold 8,000 copies more than her debut album did in its first week, In a Perfect World..., it failed to match that album's debut chart position of number four. On the U.S. R&B/Hip-Hop Albums, No Boys Allowed debuted at number seven, giving Hilson her second top-ten album on the chart, but again failed to match her debut album's position of number one.

In its second week, No Boys Allowed experienced a 68% decline in sales, shifting a further 33,000 copies and causing the album to drop four spots on the Billboard 200 to number fifteen. On the R&B/Hip-Hop Albums Chart, the album dropped one spot down to number eight. As of April 2012 the album has sold 312,808 copies in the United States. In the United Kingdom, the No Boys Allowed debuted on the UK Albums Chart at number seventy six, considerably lower than Hilson's previous album, In a Perfect World..., which debuted at number twenty-two. However, in comparison, her previous album was released off the back of the 2009 top-five single "Knock You Down", whereas No Boys Allowed's lead single, "Pretty Girl Rock", only managed to reach top-sixty. No Boys Allowed has sold 447,000 copies globally. The album was considerably more successful on the UK R&B Chart, where it reached number ten.

== Track listing ==
No Boys Allowed – Standard edition
No.	Title	Writer(s)	Producer(s)	Length
1.	"Buyou" (featuring J. Cole)	Matthew Samuels; Brandon Green; Matthew Burnett; Keri Hilson; Jermaine Cole	Boi-1da; Burnett; Polow da Don; Bei Maejor	4:19
2.	"Pretty Girl Rock"	Shaffer Smith; Charles Harmon; Ralph MacDonald; William Salter; Bill Withers	Chuck Harmony	4:04
3.	"The Way You Love Me" (featuring Rick Ross)	Jamal Jones; India Boodram; Jazmyn Michel; Kesia Hollins; Paul Dawson; William Roberts; Stanley Benton; Hilson	Polow da Don; Hollywood Hotsauce	4:39
4.	"Bahm Bahm (Do It Once Again) / I Want You"	Jones; Timothy Thomas; Theron Thomas	Polow da Don	4:48
5.	"One Night Stand" (featuring Chris Brown)	Chris Brown; Kevin McCall; Charlie Bereal	Bereal	3:53
6.	"Lose Control (Let Me Down)" (featuring Nelly)	Mikkel Eriksen; Tor Hermansen; Ester Dean; Cornell Haynes	Stargate	4:49
7.	"Toy Soldier"	Nathaniel Hills; Dean; Marcella Araica	Danja	4:01
8.	"Breaking Point"	Timothy Mosley; Jerome Harmon; Hilson; Timothy Clayton	Timbaland; J-Roc	4:15
9.	"Beautiful Mistake"	Hilson; Mosley; J. Harmon; Clayton	Timbaland; J-Roc	4:13
10.	"Gimme What I Want"	Hilson; Samuels; Green; Burnett	Boi-1da; Burnett	2:59
11.	"All the Boys"	Jerry Duplessis; John Stephens; Arden Altino	Duplessis; Altino	4:13
12.	"Pretty Girl Rock" (Remix) (featuring Kanye West)	Smith; C. Harmon; MacDonald; Salter; Withers; Kanye West	Chuck Harmony	4:16

No Boys Allowed – North American deluxe edition (bonus tracks)
No.	Title	Writer(s)	Producer(s)	Length
13.	"Hustler"	Samuel Jean	Bei Maejor	4:06
14.	"Lie to Me" (featuring Timbaland)	Hilson; Mosley; J. Harmon; Keithin Pittman	Timbaland; J-Mizzle; J-Roc	3:33
15.	"Won't Be Long" (featuring Timbaland)	Hilson; Mosley; Pittman; J. Harmon	Timbaland; J-Mizzle; J-Roc	4:00

No Boys Allowed – US Target edition (bonus track)
No.	Title	Writer(s)	Producer(s)	Length
16.	"So Good"	Hills; Cossom; Araica	Danja	4:10

No Boys Allowed – North American iTunes Store deluxe edition (bonus track)
No.	Title	Writer(s)	Producer(s)	Length
16.	"Fearless"	Hilson; Samuels; Green; Burnett	Boi-1da; Maejor; Polow da Don; Burnett	3:32

No Boys Allowed – International deluxe edition and Saturn new edition (bonus tracks)
No.	Title	Writer(s)	Producer(s)	Length
17.	"Drippin'"	J. Harmon; Hilson; Clayton; Mosley	Timbaland; J. Harmon	4:31
18.	"I Like" (Jost & Grubert Radio Mix)	Grubert; David Jost	Grubert; Jost	3:38

No Boys Allowed – Japanese and UK deluxe edition and Europe deluxe reissue (bonus track)
No.	Title	Writer(s)	Producer(s)	Length
17.	"So Good"	Hills; Cossom; Araica	Danja	4:10
18.	"I Like" (Jost & Grubert Radio Mix)	Robin Grubert; Jost	Grubert; Jost	3:38

Notes:

- "Pretty Girl Rock", and "Pretty Girl Rock (Remix)", interpolate "Just the Two of Us" as written by Bill Withers, Ralph MacDonald and William Salter.

== Personnel ==
Credits for No Boys Allowed adapted from Allmusic.

- Brian Allison – assistant, assistant engineer
- Arden Altino – producer
- Marcella "Ms. Lago" Araica – mixing
- Matt Benefield – assistant engineer
- Charlie Bereal – producer
- Adam Beyrer – editing
- Billy B. – make-up
- Boi-1DA – producer
- Veronika Bozeman – vocal producer, background vocals
- Matthew Burnett – additional production
- Kelvin Chu – A&R
- Corey Shoemaker – engineer
- Kevin "KD" Davis – mixing
- Demacio "Demo" Castellon – mixing
- Mike DeSalvo – assistant
- DJ Mormile – A&R
- Jerry "Wonda" Duplessis – producer
- Mikkel S. Eriksen – engineer, instrumental
- Cliff Feiman – production supervisor
- Rick Frazier – A&R
- Avena Gallagher – stylist
- Todd Gallopo – art direction, design
- Chris Gerhinger – mastering
- Chris Godbey – engineer, mixing
- Moses Gollart – assistant
- Jerome "Jroc" Harmon – producer
- Chuck Harmony – producer
- Koby Hass – assistant
- Tor Erik Hermansen – instrumental
- Keri Hilson – arranger, vocal arrangement, vocal producer
- Hollywood Hotsauce – producer
- Chazi Hourani – assistant
- Ghazi Hourani – assistant
- Mike "TrakGuru" Johnson – engineer, vocal engineer
- Aljamaal Jones – A&R
- Brandon Jones – mixing assistant
- Bryan "The Beard" Jones – assistant, engineer, vocal engineer
- Jerel Lake – mixing assistant
- Damien Lewis – assistant engineer, engineer
- James Lewis – guitar
- Bei Maejor – additional production
- Ian Mercel – assistant engineer
- Krista Michalski – coordination
- Clint Nelson – assistant
- Terrence Nelson – A&R
- Maisha Oliver – hair stylist
- Jason "JP" Perry – keyboards
- Polow da Don – additional production, executive producer, producer
- Edward Sanders – assistant
- Kevin Schinstock – engineer
- Mike Scott – guitar
- Eric Spence – A&R
- Stargate – producer
- John Stephens – piano
- Jeremy Stevenson – engineer
- Dalya Taman – creative coordinator
- Phil Tan – mixing
- Timbaland – producer
- Sergio "Sergical" Tsai – engineer, mixing
- William Villane – assistant
- Miles Walker – engineer
- Kevin Wilson – assistant
- Andre Yu – cello

== Charts ==
=== Weekly charts ===
Weekly chart performance for No Boys Allowed
Chart (2010–11)	Peak position
Irish Albums (IRMA)	96
Japanese Albums (Oricon)	41
UK Albums (OCC)	76
UK R&B Albums (OCC)	10
US Billboard 200	11
US Top R&B/Hip-Hop Albums (Billboard)	7

=== Year-end charts ===
Year-end chart performance for No Boys Allowed
Chart (2011)	Peak position
US Billboard 200	112
US Top R&B/Hip-Hop Albums (Billboard)	31

== Certifications ==
Certifications for No Boys Allowed
Region	Certification	Certified units/sales
New Zealand (RMNZ)	Gold	7,500^{‡}
^{‡} Sales+streaming figures based on certification alone.

== Release history ==
List of release dates, showing country, editions, record labels and references
Region	Date	Edition	Format	Label	Ref.
Netherlands	December 17, 2010	Standard; Deluxe	CD; digital download	Universal Music	
New Zealand	December 17, 2010	Standard; Deluxe	CD; digital download	Universal Music	
Canada	December 21, 2010	Standard; Deluxe	CD; digital download	Interscope	
United States	December 21, 2010	Standard; Deluxe	CD; digital download	Mosley Music; Zone 4	
Australia	December 24, 2010	Standard; Deluxe	CD; digital download	Universal Music	
France	January 10, 2011	Standard; Deluxe	CD; digital download	Universal Music	
Germany	January 10, 2011	Standard; Deluxe	CD; digital download	Universal Music	
United Kingdom	January 10, 2011	Standard; Deluxe	CD; digital download	Polydor	
Poland	January 21, 2011	Standard; Deluxe	CD; digital download	Universal Music	
Japan	January 26, 2011	Standard	CD; digital download	Universal Music	
Germany	July 8, 2011	Standard	CD; digital download	Universal Music	
