= UR Chicago =

US online magazine

UR Chicago is an online magazine covering regional and national lifestyles and entertainment. It was a print magazine between 1997 and 2008.

== History and profile ==
Founded in 1997, UR Chicago was published by Pure Entertainment Group. The magazine was then sold to En Prise Entertainment, LLP, a Chicago-based artist management/event promotion company owned by local tastemakers Chess Hubbard and Matt DuFour. It was published on a monthly basis.

The magazine was free of charge when it was a print publication and focused on nightlife, music, theater, art, film, dining, and fashion, focusing mainly on the Chicago area. It also offered in-depth feature reporting. In September 2008 it became a web-only magazine.
