= Gossip Center =

- Website type: Gossip Entertainment
- Available in: English
- Revenue: Ads
- Website: www.gossipcenter.com
- Current status: Active

Gossip Center (formerly known as Gossip Girls) is a celebrity news and gossip website owned by Bluefin Media. The site's original content is regularly featured on the homepage of Google News and FoxNews.com, and it reports over 10,000 original stories 100,000 copyrighted images in its archives. One of the fastest growing gossip websites since its re-launch in January 2007, it has grown with less than ten full-time employees from its Ohio headquarters. In addition to celebrity news and gossip, it also features movie reviews, countdowns to events, and forums.

== Background ==
Gossip Center was created in March 2003 by a network of girls located in Los Angeles, New York City, and the Midwest who were passionate about celebrity gossip. It originally operated under the URL of celebrity-gossip.net, but this was changed when Brand Technologies acquired Gossip Girls in 2006. Over the years, it has participated in the Glam Media Network and now syndicates video to its entertainment section along with other providers such as E! Online and TV Guide. NBC24, the NBC affiliate in Northwest Ohio, has partnered with Gossip Girls for a weekly televised broadcast that covers gossip headlines.

== Content ==
Gossip Center publishes over 30 original stories and between 200-600 images each day. It routinely covers the most popular celebrities of the moment, such as Britney Spears, Brad Pitt, and Vanessa Hudgens, but unlike many of its competitors, such as Dlisted and Perez Hilton, it portrays them in a neutral or positive light.
