= Kevin Rudolf discography =

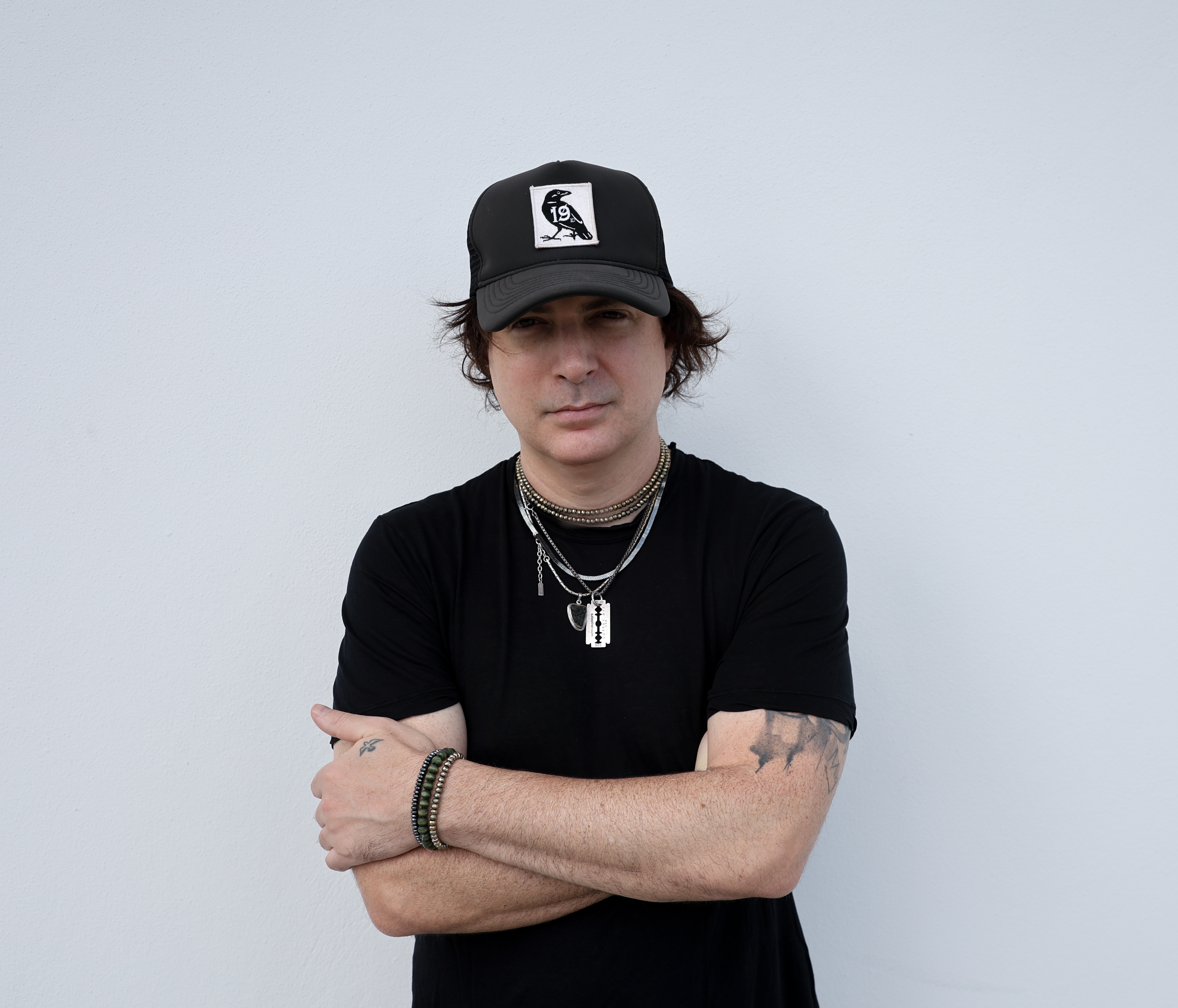
- Kevin Rudolf
- Studio albums: 4
- Singles: 43
- Music videos: 9

The discography of American singer-songwriter Kevin Rudolf, consists of four studio albums, forty-three singles and nine music videos.

== Albums ==
=== Studio albums ===
Year	Album details	Peak chart positions	
Year	Album details	US	CAN
2001	Binocular: Release date: May 22, 2001; Label: Maverick	—	—
2008	In the City: Release date: November 24, 2008; Label: Cash Money, Universal Republic	94	74
2010	To the Sky: Release date: June 15, 2010; Label: Cash Money, Universal Republic	78	70
2024	Against the Wall (Vol. 1): Release date: September 27, 2024; Label: BAMF	—	—

== Singles ==
=== As lead artist ===
Year	Single	Peak chart positions							Certifications (sales threshold)	Album
Year	Single	US	US Pop	AUS	CAN	IRE	NZ	UK	Certifications (sales threshold)	Album
2001	"Deep"	―	―	―	―	―	―	―		Binocular
2008	"Let It Rock" (featuring Lil Wayne)	5	6	3	2	3	15	5	RIAA: 4× Platinum; ARIA: Platinum; BPI: Gold; RMNZ: Gold	In the City
2009	"Welcome to the World" (featuring Rick Ross or Kid Cudi)	58	26	42	56	34	―	77	RIAA: Gold	In the City
2010	"I Made It (Cash Money Heroes)" (featuring Birdman, Jay Sean and Lil Wayne)	21	17	4	44	21	4	37	RIAA: Platinum; ARIA: Platinum	To the Sky
2010	"You Make the Rain Fall" (featuring Flo Rida)	―	―	―	59	―	―	―		To the Sky
2012	"Don't Give Up"	―	―	―	―	―	―	―		Non-album singles
2012	"Champions" (featuring Limp Bizkit, Birdman and Lil Wayne)	―	―	―	―	―	―	―		Non-album singles
2013	"Here's to Us"	―	―	―	―	―	―	―		Non-album singles
2015	"Blaze of Glory"	―	―	―	―	―	―	―		Non-album singles
2015	"That Other Ship"	―	―	―	―	―	―	―		Non-album singles
2017	"Nobody Gets Out Alive"	―	―	―	―	―	―	―		Non-album singles
2019	"I Will Not Break" (featuring Lil Wayne)	―	―	―	―	―	―	―		Do You Feel Me? EP
2019	"Hold Your Head High"	―	―	―	―	―	―	―		Do You Feel Me? EP
2019	"Do You Feel Me?"	―	―	―	―	―	―	―		Do You Feel Me? EP
2020	"Social Anxiety" (featuring Jared Evan)	―	―	―	―	―	―	―		Non-album singles
2020	"Watch Me Now"	―	―	―	―	―	―	―		Non-album singles
2020	"Never Know Why"	―	―	―	―	―	―	―		Non-album singles
2020	"Babylon"	―	―	―	―	―	―	―		Non-album singles
2020	"Generation Maybe?"	―	―	―	―	―	―	―		Non-album singles
2020	"The Introvert's Anthem"	―	―	―	―	―	―	―		Non-album singles
2020	"Escape That's OK"	―	―	―	―	―	―	―		Non-album singles
2020	"Are We Having Fun?"	―	―	―	―	―	―	―		Non-album singles
2021	"Live Your Life"	―	―	―	―	―	―	―		Non-album singles
2022	"Summertime"	―	―	―	―	―	―	―		Non-album singles
2022	"Gold"	―	―	―	―	―	―	―		Non-album singles
2022	"We Made It"	―	―	―	―	―	―	―		Non-album singles
2023	"10 Fingers"	―	―	―	―	―	―	―		Non-album singles
2023	"Stand Back"	―	―	―	―	―	―	―		Non-album singles
2023	"That's the Way It's Supposed to Be"	―	―	―	―	―	―	―		Non-album singles
2024	"Change My Mind"	―	―	―	―	―	―	―		Against the Wall (Vol. 1)
2024	"Some Get Left Behind"	―	―	―	―	―	―	―		Against the Wall (Vol. 1)
2024	"I Don't Like"	―	―	―	―	―	―	―		Against the Wall (Vol. 1)
2024	"Guitar Dreams"	―	―	―	―	―	―	―		Against the Wall (Vol. 1)
2024	"Judgement Day"	―	―	―	―	―	―	―		Against the Wall (Vol. 1)
2024	"Meaner"	―	―	―	―	―	―	―		Against the Wall (Vol. 1)
2024	"My Vibe"	―	―	―	―	―	―	―		Against the Wall (Vol. 1)
2024	"Hellacious"	―	―	―	―	―	―	―		Against the Wall (Vol. 1)
2024	"End of the World"	―	―	―	―	―	―	―		Against the Wall (Vol. 1)
2024	"Samurai X-Ray"	―	―	―	―	―	―	―		Against the Wall (Vol. 2)
2024	"Hold Your Head High (Original Version)"	―	―	―	―	―	―	―		Against the Wall (Vol. 2)
2024	"On My Grind"	―	―	―	―	―	―	―		Against the Wall (Vol. 2)
2024	"We Are Drums"	―	―	―	―	―	―	―		Against the Wall (Vol. 2)
2025	"One Man Show"	―	―	―	―	―	―	―		Against the Wall (Vol. 2)

=== As featured artist ===
Year	Single	Peak chart positions			Certifications (sales threshold)	Album
Year	Single	US Pop	AUS	CAN	Certifications (sales threshold)	Album
2009	"Shooting Star" (Party Rock Remix) (David Rush featuring Pitbull, Kevin Rudolf and LMFAO)	33	—	66		Feel the Rush Vol. 1
2010	"Just Say So" (Brian McFadden featuring Kevin Rudolf)	—	1	—	ARIA: Platinum	Wall of Soundz
2025	"Hotcore" (John Roberts featuring Kevin Rudolf)	—	—	—		Non-album single

== Guest appearances ==
List of non-single guest appearances, with other performing artists, showing year released and album name
Title	Year	Other artist(s)	Album
"One Way Trip"	2010	Lil Wayne	Rebirth
"I Want It All"	2010	Birdman, Lil Wayne	Priceless
"On and On"	2010	Flo Rida	Only One Flo (Part 1)
"A Million Lights"	2011	DJ Khaled, Tyga, Cory Gunz, Mack Maine, Jae Millz	We the Best Forever
"Novacane"	2011	Lil Wayne	Tha Carter IV
"Always Rains"	2011	Jared Evan	Back and Fourth
"Don't Hustle Again"	2011	Birdman, Rick Ross	The H

== Music videos ==
Year	Title	Director
2008	"Let It Rock"	Justin Francis
2009	"Welcome to the World"	Jeff Panzer/Bill Yukich
2010	"I Made It (Cash Money Heroes)"	Jeff Panzer/David Rousseau
2010	"You Make the Rain Fall"	Jeff Panzer
2012	"Don't Give Up"	Shomi Patwary
2013	"Champions" (featuring Lil Wayne, Limp Bizkit, Birdman)	Shomi Patwary
2013	"Here's to Us"	Kevin Rudolf
2015	"That Other Ship"	Claire Christerson
2017	"Nobody Gets Out Alive"	
2019	"I Will Not Break" (feat. Lil Wayne)	Brian Mccormack

== Production credits ==
- 2005
  - "Thinking of You" (David Banner feat. Case)
- 2006
  - "Say It Right" (Nelly Furtado)
  - "Scream" (Timbaland feat. Keri Hilson and Nicole Scherzinger)
  - "Release" (Timbaland feat. Justin Timberlake)
  - "My Style" (The Black Eyed Peas feat. Justin Timberlake)
- 2008
  - "Let It Rock" (Kevin Rudolf feat. Lil Wayne)
  - "Something About You" (Kevin Lyttle)
- 2009
  - "Good Girls Go Bad" (Cobra Starship feat. Leighton Meester)
  - "Love Letter" (Leona Lewis)
  - "Beat Me Up" (Allison Iraheta)
  - "Halfway Gone" (Lifehouse)
  - "Falling In" (Lifehouse)
  - "Late Night Automatic" (Three 6 Mafia)
  - "Hot Mess" (Cobra Starship)
  - "One Way Trip" (Lil Wayne feat. Kevin Rudolf)
  - "I Want It All" (Birdman feat. Lil Wayne & Kevin Rudolf)
  - "Better Than Her" (Matisse)
  - "Paradice" (Lil Wayne)
- 2010
  - "I Made It (Cash Money Heroes)" (Kevin Rudolf feat. Jay Sean, Lil Wayne & Birdman)
  - "Just Say So" (Brian McFadden feat. Kevin Rudolf)
  - "Ghost" (Fefe Dobson)
  - "Round & Round" (Selena Gomez & The Scene)
  - "Oh Yeah" (B.T.R.)
  - "City Is Ours" (B.T.R.)
  - "On and On" (Flo Rida feat. Kevin Rudolf)
  - "All I Need" (Natasha Bedingfield feat. Kevin Rudolf)
  - "The World Belongs To Me" (My Darkest Days)
- 2011
  - "One Night" (Jesse McCartney)
  - "I Think She Likes Me" (Jesse McCartney)
  - "Coming Back Down" (Hollywood Undead)
  - "Levitate" (Hollywood Undead)
  - "Don't Cry Now" (Makeba Riddick)
  - "Love2Baby" (Christian TV)
  - "Always Rain" (Jared Evan feat. Kevin Rudolf)
  - "Grow Up" (Cher Lloyd feat. Busta Rhymes)
  - "A Million Lights" (DJ Khaled feat. Kevin Rudolf, Tyga, Jae Millz, Mack Maine & Cory Gunz)
- 2013
  - "Little Bit of Everything" (Keith Urban)
  - "Different for Girls" (Gavin Degraw)
  - "Leading Man" (Gavin Degraw)

=== Musician credits ===
Instrument	Year	Title	Album	Artist(s)
Guitar, Bass	2005	"Thinking of You"	Certified	David Banner (feat. Case)
Guitar	2006	"Say It Right"	Loose	Nelly Furtado
Guitar	2006	"Scream"	Timbaland Presents Shock Value	Timbaland (feat. Keri Hilson and Nicole Scherzinger)
Guitar	2006	"Release"	Timbaland Presents Shock Value	Timbaland (feat. Justin Timberlake)
Guitar	2006	"My Style"	Monkey Business	The Black Eyed Peas (feat. Justin Timberlake)
