= Binocular =

Binocular may refer to:

== Science and technology ==
- Binocular vision, seeing with two eyes
- Binoculars, a telescopic tool
- Binocular microscope, binocular viewing of objects through a single objective lens

== Other uses ==
- Binocular (horse), a thoroughbred race horse
- Binocular (band), Kevin Rudolf's band that released a self-titled album in 2001
  - Binocular (album)

== See also ==
- Binocular rivalry, a phenomenon of visual perception
- Binoviewer, an optical device designed to enable binocular viewing through a single objective
