= Cop Car =

Cop car is a slang term for a police car.

Cop car may also refer to:

- Cop Car (film), a 2015 American film
- "Cop Car" (Keith Urban song), 2014
- "Cop Car", a song by Joey Beltram, 1996
- "Cop Car", a song by Mitski from the soundtrack for The Turning, 2020

== See also ==
- Paddywagon
- Prisoner transport vehicle
