= Release (Timbaland song) =

Song by Timbaland featuring Justin Timberlake

from the album Shock Value
- Released: 2008
- Recorded: 2007
- Studio: Thomas Crown Studios (Virginia Beach, Virginia); Chalice Recording Studios (Los Angeles, California); Hit Factory Criteria (Miami, Florida)
- Genre: House; funk
- Length: 3:25
- Label: Mosley; Blackground; Interscope
- Songwriters: Timothy Mosley; Craig Longmiles; Justin Timberlake
- Producer: Timbaland

"Release" is a song performed by American producer and rapper Timbaland, taken from his second studio album Shock Value (2007). The song features vocals by longtime collaborator Justin Timberlake. Mosley and Timberlake co-wrote the song together with rapper and songwriter Craig Longmiles. The song was produced solely by Timbaland and recorded in various locations in the United States. "Release" is an uptempo house and funk song that incorporates elements of dance and urban music.

"Release" received generally positive reviews from music critics, with many praising the song's uptempo sound and unusual style. The song drew comparison to music by British electronic dance recording duo Basement Jaxx and to Justin Timberlake's "SexyBack", which Timbaland helped write and produce. Upon the release of Shock Value in the United States, "Release" debuted on the Billboard Hot 100 at number ninety-one on the strength of paid digital downloads.

== Background ==
"Release" was written and produced by Timbaland, who co-wrote the song with Justin Timberlake and Craig Longmiles. Sound engineer Demacio "Demo" Castellón handled the recording and programming of the song, which took place at three locations: Thomas Crown Studios in Virginia Beach, Virginia, Chalice Recording Studios in Los Angeles, California, and Hit Factory Criteria in Miami, Florida. Additional recording was engineered by Marcella "Ms. Lago" Araica. Castellón was assisted by Matty Green in mixing the song, which took place at Timbaland's recording studio, Thomas Crown Studios, in Virginia Beach, Virginia. The track was edited by Ron Taylor through the use of Pro Tools technology. Guitars were played by musicians Kevin Rudolf and Dan Warner, the latter also provided the bass featured on the track. Timbaland is also featured as the instrumentalist behind the drums and keyboards present on "Release". Singer Keri Hilson is featured as the background vocalist with producer and musician Jim Beanz, who also helmed the vocal production of the song. "Release" was one of four choices in a poll on Timbaland's website to vote for the fifth single from Shock Value. The other choices included "Scream", "Miscommunication" and "One and Only". It ended up with only 21% of the 5000+ votes. (Note: Although "One & Only" was winning in the votes with 45%, "Scream" was already getting spins off of big top 40 stations, including KIIS, and it was released as the fifth and final single from the album.)

== Composition ==
"Release"
An 18-second sample of the chorus of "Release".

"Release" is an uptempo house and funk song with a length of 3:25 (three minutes and twenty five seconds). It combines elements of R&B and dance music. The song is built upon futuristic club beats and funky "monster style" keyboards. Many critics compared the song to Justin Timberlake's "SexyBack" (2006), a song that Timbaland co-produced and co-wrote for Timberlake's second studio album FutureSex/LoveSounds (2006), as well as music by British electronic dance duo Basement Jaxx. Sal Cinquemani of Slant Magazine commented that ""Release" sounds like an early or subsequent version of "SexyBack"." Nate Patrin of Pitchfork Magazine described the song as a "berserk Bootsy-meets-Thomas Dolby-by-way-of-Basement Jaxx house-funk." Ivan Rott of About.com labels "Release" as a "quasi-SexyBack imitation."

== Critical reception ==
Andy Kellman of All Music Guide dismissed the song as a ripoff of a Basement Jaxx song, while ironically comparing the ripoff to Basement Jaxx's "U Can't Stop Me" ripoff of Timbaland and Missy Elliott's musical collaborations. Nate Patrin of Pitchfork Magazine dismissed Timbaland's vocals as "atonal half-sung bellowing" that "overextends its welcome". Luke Bainbridge of The Observer named "Release" as one of the album's best tracks as well as one of the album's standouts, with "Bounce" and "The Way I Are". Ivan Rott, a writer for About.com, felt differently about it, writing that the song, along with "The Way I Are", is "mediocre to say the least." Christian Hoard, in his review of Shock Value for Rolling Stone, wrote " On "Release", Tim and Timberlake work up disco that sounds a bit like “SexyBack”, in a good way." Steve "Flash" Juon of RapReviews compared "Release" to "SexyBack", writing it off as an unofficial sequel to the aforementioned song and found it to be better than its predecessor. David Hyland of WESH Orlando found the song to be more interesting and elaborate than "Kill Yourself", which he describes as "so un-ambitious that it's disappointing." He added about "Release", however, that the song gets old. Norman Mayers of Prefix Magazine labeled "Release" and "The Way I Are" as some of the most successful tracks on Shock Value.

== Credits and personnel ==
Credits adapted from the liner notes of Shock Value, released through Mosley Music Group, in association with Blackground Records and Interscope Records.

Recording and mixing

- Recorded at Thomas Crown Studios in Virginia Beach, Virginia, Chalice Recording Studios in Los Angeles, California, and Hit Factory Criteria in Miami, Florida
- Mixing at Thomas Crown Studios in Virginia Beach, Virginia

Personnel

- Songwriting – Timothy Mosley, Justin Timberlake, Craig Longmiles
- Production – Timbaland, Danja
- Recording, mixing and programming – Demacio "Demo" Castellón
- Recording (additional) – Marcella "Ms. Lago" Araica
- Mixing (assistant) – Matty Green
- Pro Tools – Ron Taylor
- Guitar – Kevin Rudolf, Dan Warner
- Vocal production – Jim Beanz
- Bass – Dan Warner
- Drums and keyboards – Timbaland
- Background vocals – Jim Beanz, Keri Hilson

== Charts ==
Chart performance for "Release"
| Chart (2007) | Peak position |
|---|---|
| Canada Hot 100 (Billboard) | 86 |
| US Billboard Hot 100 | 91 |
