= I Will Not Break =

I Will Not Break may refer to:

- "I Will Not Break (song)", a 2025 song by Disturbed
- "I Will Not Break", a 2014 extended play by James LaBrie
- "I Will Not Break", a 2014 song by Elise Testone
- "I Will Not Break", a 2019 song by Kevin Rudolf
