= Fuse (Keith Urban album) =

Studio album by Keith Urban
- Released: 10 September 2013
- Recorded: 2013
- Genre: Country pop; pop rock
- Length: 47:15
- Label: Hit Red; Capitol Nashville
- Producer: Benny Blanco; Nathan Chapman; Ross Copperman; Zach Crowell; Mike Elizondo; Dann Huff; Jay Joyce; Stargate; Keith Urban; Butch Walker

Keith Urban chronology
The Story So Far (2012)	Fuse (2013)	Ripcord (2016)

Singles from Fuse
- 1. "Little Bit of Everything" Released: 14 May 2013; 2. "Shame" Released: 28 August 2013; 3. "We Were Us" Released: 16 September 2013; 4. "Cop Car" Released: 13 January 2014; 5. "Somewhere in My Car" Released: 23 June 2014; 6. "Raise 'Em Up" Released: 26 January 2015

Fuse is the eighth studio album by Australian country music singer Keith Urban. It was released on 10 September 2013 via Hit Red and Capitol Records Nashville. The album includes features from Miranda Lambert and Eric Church and has spawned six singles, four of which have topped the newly introduced US Billboard Country Airplay chart, making it his first album to produce four chart-topping singles.

Upon its release, the album debuted atop both the US Billboard 200 and the Billboard's Top Country Albums charts, becoming Urban's fourth (non-consecutive) number one album on the latter. It received generally positive reviews from contemporary music critics, who complimented the more diverse musical styles explored on the songs.

== Background ==
Regarding the sound of the new album, Urban said during an interview with Rolling Stone that "[he] just wanted to see how far [he] could go before it's not [him]." He also said he was inspired by U2's album Achtung Baby. "Bono said, [Achtung Baby] had to be the sound of [U2] chopping down The Joshua Tree, which I thought was great," he added. "That's where I found myself at. I can keep making the same record, but I don't want to do that." The album cover was revealed on 1 August 2013.

"Come Back to Me", a track co-written by singer-songwriter Brandy Clark, also appeared on her 2023 self-titled album.

== Singles ==
The album's lead single "Little Bit of Everything", written by Brad and Brett Warren (both of The Warren Brothers) along with Kevin Rudolf, was released on 14 May 2013. This song reached number one on the US Billboard Country Airplay chart in September 2013, as did "We Were Us", which was released as the album's second international single. in September 2013. "Shame" was released as the second single in Australia and New Zealand only in August 2013. The third international single, "Cop Car" was released in January 2014. The fourth international single, "Somewhere in My Car", was released on 23 June 2014. That song also reached number one on the Country Airplay chart late that year. The fifth international single, "Raise 'Em Up" is duet with Eric Church. it was released on 26 January 2015, and became the fourth (of the five North American releases) to top the Country Airplay chart in May 2015.

== Critical reception ==
Professional ratings
Aggregate scores
Source	Rating
Metacritic	74/100
Review scores
Source	Rating
Allmusic	3.5/5 stars
Country Weekly	A
Edmonton Journal	4/5 stars
HitFix	B
The Montreal Gazette	1/5 stars
Newsday	A−
The Oakland Press	2.5/4 stars
Rolling Stone	3.5/5 stars
Roughstock	5/5 stars
USA Today	3/4 stars

Fuse garnered generally positive reception from music critics to critique the album. At Metacritic, the album was assigned a weighted average score based upon selected mainstream critics reviews and ratings, which based upon four reviews, the album has a Metascore of a 74. Country Weekly's Bob Paxman said that the release "mesh[ed] Keith's usual blend of pop and country with some R&B touches and even some New Age-y sounds." He praised the variety of sounds and thought that the vocals were more "prominent than on Urban's previous albums." Will Hermes of Rolling Stone highlighted "What is surprising, though, is how unforced and fun the record sounds", and this was because "[s]ometimes, leaving your zone is the best way to find yourself." At Allmusic, Thom Jurek wrote that "For all the piecemeal recording, technological obsession and sheer ambition on the Fuse, Urban manages to fashion it all into a [mostly] working whole and maintain his identity as a contemporary country artist, even as he reaches for the mainstream pop fences."

Jerry Shirver of USA Today suggested that "Deleting generic material would have made the gems pop more, but that's minor since there are plenty of keepers". At The Oakland Press, Gary Graff told that "Fuse does lean a bit heavy on same-sounding arrangements (gentle verses swelling into bombastic choruses) but the songs are consistently strong, and Urban's performances on both guitar and vocals – including duets with Miranda Lambert ('We Were Us') and Eric Church ('Raise 'Em Up') – certainly help the new sonic approaches go down easy." Glenn Gamboa of Newsday said that the album was "filled with plenty of pleasant surprises. The biggest one, though, is how high Urban raised his ambitions and then delivered impressively on them." At Edmonton Journal, Amanda Ash stated that the release was "a thrill that's for sure, although the sentimental ups and downs may be hard on those with pop-sensitive stomachs."

At The New York Times, Jon Caramanica wrote a mixed review for the album, and evoked that "[t]he words are working hard here, and the music is, too, but Mr. Urban is gliding through, barely quaking at all." Melinda Newman at HitFix affirmed that even though Urban "plays beyond country's confines on a few tracks, most tunes hew closely to what the faithful have come to love: mid-tempo tunes anchored by banjo or guitar and Urban’s instantly recognizable vocals." Bobby Peacock of Roughstock praised the variety of production and songwriting, saying of the latter that some of the songs "ha[d] different details and/or phrasing than his usual songs." He also wrote that "All of the changes [were] just right, fitting into his signature sound while offering something new and creative at every turn." At The Montreal Gazette, Bernard Perusse wrote that the album "[was] mind-numbingly predictable arena pop-rock" and that "[e]very singsong chorus, every wailing guitar solo and every heartland lyric sounds so written by committee that it’s almost impossible to tell one radio-friendly track from the other."

== Commercial performance ==
During its first week of release, Fuse sold over 98,000 copies in the United States after debuting at number one both on the US Billboard 200 and Top Country Albums charts. As of April 2016, the album has sold over 478,000 copies in the US. The album was certified Platinum by the RIAA on 14 April 2017 for a million combined units of sales, tracks and streams.

The album also debuted at number one in both Canada and Australia and peaked within the Top 10 in the United Kingdom. It is Urban's second album to chart in his native New Zealand, after 2012's The Story So Far.

== Track listing ==
No.	Title	Writer(s)	Producer	Length
1.	"Somewhere in My Car"	Keith Urban; J. T. Harding	Urban; Dann Huff	3:56
2.	"Even the Stars Fall 4 U"	Urban; Ross Copperman; David Lee Murphy	Urban; Butch Walker	3:59
3.	"Cop Car"	Zach Crowell; Sam Hunt; Matt Jenkins	Urban; Crowell	4:16
4.	"Shame"	Mikkel Storleer Eriksen; Tor Erik Hermansen; Benjamin Levine; Ammar Malik; Dan Omelio; Ross Golan; Justin Parker	Urban; Stargate; Benny Blanco	3:03
5.	"Good Thing"	Urban; Mike Elizondo; Natalie Hemby	Urban; Elizondo	3:52
6.	"We Were Us" (featuring Miranda Lambert)	Nicolle Galyon; Jimmy Robbins; Jon Nite	Urban; Nathan Chapman	3:11
7.	"Love's Poster Child"	Copperman; Heather Morgan	Urban; Jay Joyce	3:29
8.	"She's My 11"	Urban; Copperman; Jaren Johnston	Urban; Copperman	3:17
9.	"Come Back to Me"	Brandy Clark; Shane McAnally; Trevor Rosen	Urban; Walker	3:52
10.	"Red Camaro"	Urban; Elizondo; Brett James	Urban; Elizondo	3:59
11.	"Little Bit of Everything"	Kevin Rudolf; Brad Warren; Brett Warren	Urban; Chapman	3:25
12.	"Raise 'Em Up" (featuring Eric Church)	Tom Douglas; Johnston; Jeffrey Steele	Urban; Chapman	3:04
13.	"Heart Like Mine"	Urban; Butch Walker	Urban; Walker	3:52
Total length:				47:15

Deluxe edition
No.	Title	Writer(s)	Producer	Length
14.	"Black Leather Jacket"	Copperman; Douglas; Johnston	Urban; Walker	3:42
15.	"Gonna B Good"	Robbins; Tony Martin; Wendell Mobley	Urban; Huff	2:52
16.	"Lucky Charm"	Urban; Jay Joyce; Jeremy Spillman	Urban; Joyce	3:06
Total length:				56:55

== Personnel ==
Compiled from liner notes.

"Somewhere in My Car"

- J. Bonilla – programming
- Dann Huff – electric guitar, acoustic guitar
- Tony Lucido – bass guitar
- Matt Mahaffey – keyboards, drums
- Russell Terrell – background vocals
- Keith Urban – all vocals, ganjo, electric guitar, slide guitar, EBow, piano

"Even the Stars Fall 4 U"

- Jake Sinclair – bass guitar, programming, keyboards, percussion
- Mark Stepro – drums
- Keith Urban – all vocals, acoustic guitar, electric guitar, ganjo, mandolin, percussion
- Butch Walker – background vocals, acoustic guitar, electric guitar, percussion, keyboards, programming
- Stephanie Wu – fiddle

"Cop Car"

- Zach Crowell – programming, electric guitar, acoustic guitar, bass guitar, piano, percussion, synthesizer, background vocals
- John Fields – bass guitar
- Devin Malone – dobro, pedal steel guitar, electric guitar
- Chris McHugh – drums
- Russell Terrell – background vocals
- Keith Urban – all vocals, electric guitar, EBow

"Shame"

- Benny Blanco – instrumentation, programming
- Ammar Malik – bass guitar
- Stargate – instrumentation, programming
- Keith Urban – ganjo, electric guitar

"Good Thing"

- Mike Elizondo – programming, bass guitar, keyboards
- Keith Urban – all vocals, ganjo, electric guitar, acoustic guitar

"We Were Us"

- Nathan Chapman – programming, bass guitar, acoustic guitar, keyboards
- Miranda Lambert – lead vocals
- Keith Urban – all vocals, electric guitar, acoustic guitar, ganjo

"Love's Poster Child"

- Keith Urban – all vocals, baritone guitar, bass guitar, mandolin, ganjo, electric guitar, drums, programming

"She's My 11"

- Ross Copperman – background vocals, piano, accordion, programming
- Jerry Flowers – bass guitar
- Matt Mahaffey – keyboards
- Jaren Johnston – background vocals
- Chris McHugh – drums
- Keith Urban – all vocals, electric guitar, ganjo

"Come Back to Me"

- Keith Urban – all vocals, electric guitar, acoustic guitar
- Butch Walker – background vocals, bass guitar, keyboards, programming

"Red Camaro"

- Mike Elizondo – programming, bass guitar, keyboards, electric guitar
- Caitlin Evanson – fiddle
- Keith Urban – all vocals, electric guitar, acoustic guitar, ganjo

"Little Bit of Everything"

- Nathan Chapman – drum programming, synthesizer bass, ukulele, piano, keyboards
- Kevin Rudolf – guitar riff on chorus
- Keith Urban – all vocals, ganjo, electric guitar, slide guitar, guitar solo

"Raise 'Em Up"

- Nathan Chapman – programming, bass guitar, keyboards, background vocals
- Eric Church – lead vocals
- Keith Urban – all vocals, electric guitar, acoustic guitar

"Heart Like Mine"

- Keith Urban – all vocals
- Butch Walker – background vocals, bass guitar, mandolin, acoustic guitar, keyboards, strings, drums, percussion, programming

"Black Leather Jacket"

- Keith Urban – all vocals
- Butch Walker – background vocals, bass, acoustic guitar, ganjo, mandolin, bouzouki, drums, percussion, keyboards, accordion, programming

"Gonna B Good"

- J. Bonilla – programming
- Jerry Flowers – background vocals
- Wes Hightower – background vocals
- Dann Huff – electric guitar, bouzouki
- Charlie Judge – synthesizer
- Tony Lucido – bass guitar
- Gene Miller – background vocals
- Keith Urban – all vocals, electric guitar, acoustic guitar, slide guitar, ganjo, bouzouki, baby sitar

"Lucky Charm"

- Jared Champion – drums
- Jay Joyce – electric guitar, acoustic guitar, bass guitar, Mellotron, programming
- Keith Urban – all vocals, electric guitar, acoustic guitar

== Charts ==
=== Weekly charts ===
Chart (2013–14)	Peak position
Australian Albums (ARIA)	1
Australian Country Albums (ARIA)	1
Canadian Albums (Billboard)	1
New Zealand Albums (RMNZ)	28
UK Country Albums (OCC)	5
US Billboard 200	1
US Top Country Albums (Billboard)	1

=== Year-end charts ===
Chart (2013)	Position
Australian Albums (ARIA)	43
US Billboard 200	126
US Top Country Albums (Billboard)	32

Chart (2014)	Position
Australian Albums (ARIA)	69
US Billboard 200	108
US Top Country Albums (Billboard)	16

Chart (2015)	Position
US Top Country Albums (Billboard)	58

=== Singles ===
Year	Single	Peak chart positions					
Year	Single	AUS	CAN	CAN Country	US	US Hot Country	US Country Airplay
2013	"Little Bit of Everything"	40	35	1	33	6	1
2013	"Shame"^{[A]}	35	—	—	—	—	—
2013	"We Were Us"	—	25	2	26	1	1
2014	"Cop Car"	—	38	5	41	4	8
2014	"Somewhere in My Car"	—	32	4	49	3	1
2015	"Raise 'Em Up"	—	47	1	56	8	1
"—" denotes releases that did not chart or were not released to that region

Notes

- A "Shame" was released in Australia and New Zealand only as the second single from Fuse in August 2013.

== Certifications ==
Region	Certification	Certified units/sales
Australia (ARIA)	Platinum	70,000^{^}
Canada (Music Canada)	Gold	40,000^{^}
United States (RIAA)	Platinum	1,000,000^{‡} / 478,000
^{^} Shipments figures based on certification alone.
