= Shock Value (Timbaland album) =

Studio album by Timbaland
- Released: April 2, 2007
- Genres: Hip-hop; R&B
- Length: 66:57
- Labels: Blackground; Mosley; Interscope
- Producers: Timothy "Timbaland" Mosley (exec.); Barry Hankerson (exec.); Nate "Danja" Hills; Walter "Lil Walt" Millsap III; Boss Beats; Hannon Lane; Greg Wells

Timbaland chronology
Under Construction, Part II (2003)	Shock Value (2007)	Shock Value II (2009)

Singles from Shock Value
- 1. "Give It to Me" Released: February 6, 2007; 2. "The Way I Are" Released: June 12, 2007; 3. "Apologize" Released: September 11, 2007; 4. "Scream" Released: November 10, 2007

Shock Value is the second solo studio album by American musician Timbaland. The album was released by Blackground Records, Mosley Music Group and Interscope Records on April 2, 2007. Shock Value features a long list of guest artists, among them Fall Out Boy, Justin Timberlake, the Hives, Keri Hilson, Nelly Furtado, Missy Elliott, 50 Cent, Tony Yayo, Dr. Dre, OneRepublic, Elton John, Magoo and Nicole Scherzinger.

== Background and release ==
"Release" is featured in the EA Sports game Madden NFL 08 and "The Way I Are" is also on the soundtrack of NBA Live 08. On April 16, the unreleased song "Laugh at 'Em" was leaked to the internet. It was originally supposed to be on the album but was not completed in time. It features Jay-Z and Justin Timberlake. The song is now known as the "Give It to Me" remix. Another unreleased track called "I See U", featuring Attitude and D.O.E., was also leaked to the internet.

An instrumental version of the album was released on the iTunes Store on July 31, 2007.

Two songs from the album were performed on an episode of the ABC soap opera One Life to Live on October 9, 2007. Timbaland performed "The Way I Are" with Keri Hilson, D.O.E., and Sebastian. OneRepublic appeared in the same episode and performed "Apologize".

The album was supposed to be supported by a Shock Value 2008 Tour. The tour was to begin in Australia and continue to New Zealand, but was postponed and then canceled because the expected amount that Showtime Touring was to pay Timbaland was unavailable, and the star refused to perform. There had also been many scheduling conflicts with Europe. The tour was canceled one day before it was to begin.

== Critical reception ==
Professional ratings
Aggregate scores
Source	Rating
Metacritic	54/100
Review scores
Source	Rating
AllMusic	2.5/5 stars
The A.V. Club	B−
Entertainment Weekly	B
The Guardian	2/5 stars
Los Angeles Times	3/4 stars
Pitchfork Media	4.1/10
PopMatters	6/10 stars
Rolling Stone	3/5 stars
Slant Magazine	3/5 stars
Stylus Magazine	C+

Shock Value received generally mixed reviews from music critics. At Metacritic, which assigns a weighted mean rating out of 100 to reviews from mainstream critics, the album received a weighted mean score of 54, based on 24 reviews, indicating "mixed or average reviews".

== Chart performance ==
The album debuted at No. 5 on the US Billboard 200, with 138,000 copies sold. It debuted at No. 10 in the UK and on the week of July 22 climbed to No. 5. The album has since reached No. 2 in the UK and No. 13 in France.

The album was certified Platinum in Canada (100,000 units) by the CRIA in August 2007. On the Australian ARIA Albums Chart, Shock Value was certified 3× Platinum with sales of 210,000+ copies. It reached the top of the album chart on the week beginning December 31, 2007.

In BBC Radio 1's end of year chart for 2007, Shock Value was the ninth bestselling album in the UK.

On July 3, 2008, Shock Value had sold 2,234,971 in the United States, and 3,500,000 copies worldwide.

== Singles ==
- "Give It to Me" was released as the first single on March 15, 2007. It peaked at No. 1 on the Billboard Hot 100, scoring Timbaland his first US No.1. Meanwhile, it also scored Timbaland his first UK No.1. It features additional vocals from Nelly Furtado and Justin Timberlake.
- "The Way I Are" was released as the second single on June 12, 2007. It peaked at No. 3 on the Billboard Hot 100 and at No. 1 on the UK Singles Chart to score Timbaland his second UK No.1. It features additional vocals from Keri Hilson and a rap verse from D.O.E.
- "Apologize" was released as the third single on August 12, 2007. It is a remix of OneRepublic's "Apologize" and features the same vocals from the original. It peaked at No. 2 on the Billboard Hot 100, while it peaked No. 3 on the UK Singles Chart. On the Billboard Hot 100 Songs of the Decade, "Apologize" came 10th, making it his most successful song ever.
- "Scream" was released as the fourth single and final single on December 7, 2007. It failed to chart on the Billboard Hot 100 but did peak at No. 12 on the UK Singles Chart. It features additional vocals from Keri Hilson and Nicole Scherzinger.

=== Other songs ===
- "Throw It on Me" was released as promotional single on August 5, 2007, only in Australia. It features main vocals from The Hives. It peaked at No. 96 on the Billboard Hot 100. A music video for the song was released in late 2007.
- Bounce was released as a promotional single in the US on February 8, 2008, after it was featured in the soundtrack for Step Up 2: The Streets. It features a chorus from Justin Timberlake and features rap verses from Dr. Dre and Missy Elliott. The song uses an uncredited sample of the song "Dirty Talk" by Klein + M.B.O.

== Track listing ==
Standard edition
No.	Title	Writer(s)	Producer(s)	Length
1.	"Oh Timbaland"	Tim Mosley; Tim Clayton; Nina Simone	Timbaland	3:31
2.	"Give It to Me" (featuring Nelly Furtado and Justin Timberlake)	T. Mosley; Nate Hills; Clayton; Justin Timberlake; Nelly Furtado	Timbaland; Danja^{[a]}	3:54
3.	"Release" (featuring Justin Timberlake)	T. Mosley; Craig Longmiles; Timberlake	Timbaland	3:25
4.	"The Way I Are" (featuring Keri Hilson and D.O.E.)	T. Mosley; Hills; Keri Hilson; Balewa Muhammad; Candice Nelson; John Maultsby	Timbaland; Danja^{[a]}	2:59
5.	"Bounce" (featuring Dr. Dre, Missy Elliott, and Justin Timberlake)	T. Mosley; Andre Young; Melissa Elliott; Timberlake	Timbaland	4:04
6.	"Come and Get Me" (featuring 50 Cent and Tony Yayo)	T. Mosley; Curtis Jackson; Marvin Bernard; Clayton	Timbaland; Danja^{[a]}	3:30
7.	"Kill Yourself" (featuring Sebastian and Attitude)	T. Mosley; Clayton; Garland Mosley	Timbaland	4:06
8.	"Boardmeeting" (featuring Magoo)	T. Mosley; Hills; Marvin Barcliff; Robert Bell; Ronald Bell; George Brown; Eumir Deodato; Robert Mickens; Claydes Smith; James Taylor; Robert Ford; James Moore; Russell Simmons; Laurence Smith; Kurt Walker	Timbaland; Danja^{[a]}	2:29
9.	"Fantasy" (featuring Money)	Walter Millsap III; Nelson; Lamar Van Sciver; Dwight Watson; Ericka Watson; Frank Greenfield	Millsap; Boss Beats^{[a]}	4:11
10.	"Scream" (featuring Keri Hilson and Nicole Scherzinger)	T. Mosley; Hills; Hilson	Timbaland; Danja^{[a]}	5:41
11.	"Miscommunication" (featuring Keri Hilson and Sebastian)	Hills; Hilson; G. Mosley	Danja	3:18
12.	"Bombay" (featuring Amar and Jim Beanz)	T. Mosley; Amarpreet Dhanjan; James Washington	Timbaland	2:55
13.	"Throw It on Me" (featuring The Hives)	T. Mosley; Clayton; Randy Fitzsimmons	Timbaland	2:11
14.	"Time" (featuring She Wants Revenge)	T. Mosley; Justin Warfield; Adam Bravin; Clayton	Timbaland	3:57
15.	"One and Only" (featuring Fall Out Boy)	T. Mosley; Patrick Stump; Pete Wentz; Hannon Lane	Timbaland; Hannon Lane^{[a]}	4:16
16.	"Apologize" (featuring OneRepublic)	T. Mosley; Ryan Tedder	Greg Wells; Ryan Tedder; Timbaland^{[a]}	3:04
17.	"2 Man Show" (featuring Elton John)	T. Mosley; Elton John; Hills; Millsap	Timbaland; Elton John	4:25

International edition
No.	Title	Writer(s)	Producer(s)	Length
18.	"Hello" (featuring Keri Hilson and Attitude)	T. Mosley; Clayton; Hilson	Timbaland	4:36

French edition
No.	Title	Writer(s)	Producer(s)	Length
19.	"The Way I Are (French version)" (featuring Tyssem)	T. Mosley; Hills; Keri Hilson; Muhammad; Nelson; Maultsby; Tyssem	Timbaland; Danja	3:23

UK and Japan edition
No.	Title	Writer(s)	Producer(s)	Length
19.	"Come Around" (featuring M.I.A.)	T. Mosley; Clayton; Maya Arulpragasam	Timbaland; Jim Beanz^{[b]}	3:20
20.	"Give It to Me (Laugh at Em Remix)" (featuring Jay-Z and Justin Timberlake)	T. Mosley; Nate Hills; Clayton; Justin Timberlake; Nelly Furtado; Shawn Carter	Timbaland	3:20

Australian and French bonus disc
No.	Title	Writer(s)	Producer(s)	Length
1.	"Give It to Me (Laugh at Em Remix)" (featuring Jay-Z and Justin Timberlake)	T. Mosley; Nate Hills; Clayton; Justin Timberlake; Nelly Furtado; Shawn Carter	Timbaland	3:20
2.	"The Way I Are" (Timbaland vs Nephew)	T. Mosley; Hills; Keri Hilson; Balewa Muhammad; Candice Nelson; John Maultsby	Carsten Heller	3:49
3.	"The Way I Are (OneRepublic Remix)"	T. Mosley; Hills; Keri Hilson; Balewa Muhammad; Candice Nelson; John Maultsby	Ryan Tedder^{[a]}	3:33
4.	"The Way I Are (Jatin's Desi Remix)"	T. Mosley; Hills; Keri Hilson; Balewa Muhammad; Candice Nelson; John Maultsby		3:30
5.	"Come Around" (featuring M.I.A.)	T. Mosley; Clayton; Maya Arulpragasam	Timbaland	3:57
6.	"Give It to Me" (music video)			3:59
7.	"The Way I Are" (music video)			3:33
8.	"Throw It on Me" (music video)			2:47

Notes

- ^{^[a]} signifies a co-producer
- ^{^[b]} signifies a vocal producer

Sample credits

- "Oh Timbaland" contains samples "Sinner Man" as performed by Nina Simone.
- "Kill Yourself" contains dialogue samples from the 2002's Resident Evil film.
- "Boardmeeting" contains interpolations from "Get Down on It" as performed by Kool & the Gang, and replayed elements from "The Breaks" as performed by Kurtis Blow.

== Personnel ==
- K. Alexander Jr. – chorus (17)
- Marcella "Ms. Lago" Araica – programming (10), backing vocals (8), engineer (3, 5, 8, 10), mixing (4, 5, 6, 10, 11, 12)
- James Barton – mixing assistant (10)
- Jim Beanz – vocals (12), backing vocals (3, 6), vocal producer (3, 12)
- Stevie Blacke – strings (17)
- Adam Bravin – bass (14)
- Míguel Bustamante – assistant engineer (6, 11, 12)
- Kelvin Chu – A&R
- Ciara Cleary – assistant
- D. Davis – chorus (17)
- Justin Dreyfuss – marketing coordinator
- Andrew Flad – marketing
- Rick Frazier – project coordinator
- Keisha Gamble – project coordinator (9)
- Mark Gray – engineer (8), assistant engineer (1, 6, 7, 13)
- Matty Green – assistant engineer (2, 3, 17)
- Johan Gustafsson – engineer (13)
- Barry Hankerson – executive producer
- Jerome Harmon – bass (8), strings (8, 16), keyboards (5, 16, 18)
- A. Helaire – chorus (17)
- Keri Hilson – backing vocals (3)
- Bob Horn – mixing (9)
- Andrew Hurley – drums (15)
- Monique Idlett-Mosley – publicity, marketing
- S. Jackson – chorus (17)
- Jermaine "Tank" Jennings – steel guitar (1)
- Elton John – piano (17)
- Tiffany Johnson – project manager
- Gary Jordan – project coordinator (9)
- Hannon Lane – drums, keyboards, producer (15)
- N. Lollis – chorus (17)
- Ari Mihelson – photography
- E. Millsap – chorus (17)
- Walter Milsap – choir conductor (17)
- Julian Peploe – package design
- Kevin Rudolf – guitar (3, 10)
- Manny Smith – A&R
- Marcus Spence – A&R
- Johnkenun Spivery – organ (1)
- Patrick Stump – guitar, vocals (15)
- Ron Taylor – digital editing (1, 3, 4, 7, 8, 10, 14, 18)
- Ryan Tedder – producer (16)
- Timbaland – synthesizer (1, 8), drums (1, 2, 3, 4, 8, 10, 14, 17), guitar (13, 14), keyboards (3), producer (1, 2, 3, 4, 5, 6, 7, 8, 10, 12, 13, 14, 15, 16, 17, 18), executive producer, musician (5, 6, 12, 13, 18)
- Andrew Van Meter – production coordination
- Justin Warfield – guitar (14)
- Dan Warner – bass (3, 14), guitar (3, 10, 13, 14)
- Albert Watson – photography
- E. Watson – chorus (17)
- D. Williams – chorus (17)
- Craig Longmiles – writer (3)

== Charts ==
=== Weekly charts ===
Chart (2007–08)	Peak position
Australian Albums (ARIA)	1
Australian Urban Albums (ARIA)	1
Austrian Albums (Ö3 Austria Top 40)	1
Belgian Albums (Ultratop 50 Flanders)	9
Belgian Albums (Ultratop 50 Wallonia)	20
Canadian Albums (Billboard)	2
Danish Albums (Tracklisten)	4
Dutch Albums (Mega Album Top 100)	9
Finnish Albums (Suomen virallinen lista)	31
French Albums (SNEP)	13
German Albums (Media Control AG)	5
Greek Albums (IFPI Greece)	8
Hungarian Albums (Mahasz)	21
Irish Albums (IRMA)	1
Italian Albums (FIMI)	14
Japanese Albums (Oricon)	40
New Zealand Albums (RIANZ)	4
Norway Albums (VG-lista)	18
Polish Albums (ZPAV)	4
Scottish Albums (Official Charts)	6
South African Albums (RISA)	9
Swedish Albums (Sverigetopplistan)	10
Swiss Albums (Schweizer Hitparade)	5
UK Albums (OCC)	2
UK R&B Albums (Official Charts)	1
US Billboard 200	5
US Top R&B/Hip-Hop Albums (Billboard)	3

=== Year-end charts ===
Chart (2007)	Position
Australian Albums (ARIA)	10
Austrian Albums (Ö3 Austria)	47
Belgian Albums (Ultratop Flanders)	28
Belgian Albums (Ultratop Wallonia)	81
Dutch Albums (Album Top 100)	58
French Albums (SNEP)	59
German Albums (Offizielle Top 100)	22
Swedish Albums (Sverigetopplistan)	36
Swiss Albums (Schweizer Hitparade)	15
UK Albums (OCC)	9
US Billboard 200	55
US Top R&B/Hip-Hop Albums (Billboard)	42

Chart (2008)	Position
Australian Albums (ARIA)	34
Austrian Albums (Ö3 Austria)	46
Belgian Albums (Ultratop Flanders)	91
French Albums (SNEP)	189
German Albums (Offizielle Top 100)	35
Swiss Albums (Schweizer Hitparade)	38
UK Albums (OCC)	83
US Billboard 200	136
US Top R&B/Hip-Hop Albums (Billboard)	69

== Certifications ==
Region	Certification	Certified units/sales
Australia (ARIA)	3× Platinum	210,000^{^}
Austria (IFPI Austria)	Gold	10,000^{*}
Belgium (BRMA)	Gold	25,000^{*}
Canada (Music Canada)	3× Platinum	300,000^{‡}
Denmark (IFPI Danmark)	3× Platinum	60,000^{‡}
France (SNEP)	Gold	75,000^{*}
Germany (BVMI)	5× Gold	500,000^{^}
Hungary (MAHASZ)	Gold	3,000^{^}
Ireland (IRMA)	3× Platinum	45,000^{^}
Italy (FIMI)	Gold	25,000^{‡}
New Zealand (RMNZ)	3× Platinum	45,000^{‡}
Norway (IFPI Norway)	Gold	20,000^{*}
Poland (ZPAV)	2× Platinum	40,000^{*}
Russia (NFPF)	3× Platinum	60,000^{*}
Singapore (RIAS)	Gold	5,000^{*}
Sweden (GLF)	Gold	20,000^{^}
Switzerland (IFPI Switzerland)	Platinum	30,000^{^}
United Kingdom (BPI)	3× Platinum	900,000^{‡}
United States (RIAA)	Platinum	1,000,000^{^}
Summaries
Europe (IFPI)	Platinum	1,000,000^{*}
^{*} Sales figures based on certification alone.^{^} Shipments figures based on certification alone.^{‡} Sales+streaming figures based on certification alone.

Release history
Region	Date
United Kingdom	February 4, 2007
France	February 4, 2007
Germany	February 4, 2007
Japan	March 30, 2007
Italy	March 30, 2007
United States	April 3, 2007
Canada	April 3, 2007
Brazil	September 5, 2007
Spain	November 6, 2007

== Shock Value 2008 Tour ==
Shock Value 2008 Tour
- Tour by Timbaland
- Associated album: Timbaland Presents: Shock Value
- Start date: August 15, 2008
- End date: August 23, 2008
- Legs: 1 (cancelled)
- No. of shows: 5 in Australia (cancelled); 1 in New Zealand (cancelled)

Timbaland concert chronology
- Shock Value 2008 Tour (2008); Shock Value II Tour (2010)

The Shock Value 2008 Tour was supposed to be Timbaland's concert tour to support his album, Timbaland Presents: Shock Value. Dates in Australia and New Zealand were announced. However, the tour was canceled one day before it was going to begin due to scheduling conflicts in Europe.

=== Tour dates (all canceled) ===
Date	City	Venue
August 15, 2008	Sydney, Australia	Entertainment Centre
August 16, 2008	Brisbane, Australia	River Stage
August 17, 2008	Adelaide, Australia	Entertainment Centre
August 20, 2008	Perth, Australia	Challenge Stadium
August 22, 2008	Melbourne, Australia	Rod Laver Arena
August 23, 2008	Auckland, New Zealand	Vector Arena
