= Shame (Keith Urban song) =

Single by Keith Urban

from the album Fuse
- Released: 28 August 2013
- Recorded: 2013
- Genre: Country pop; pop rock
- Length: 3:03
- Label: Hit Red; Capitol Nashville
- Songwriters: Mikkel Erikson; Tor Erik Hermansen; Benjamin Levine; Ammar Malik; Dan Omelio; Ross Golan; Justin Parker
- Producers: Keith Urban; Stargate; Benny Blanco

Keith Urban singles chronology
"Little Bit of Everything" (2013)	"Shame" (2013)	"We Were Us" (2013)

"Shame" is a song co-written and co-produced by Stargate and Benny Blanco amongst others, and recorded by Australian country music singer Keith Urban. It was released in August 2013 to Australia and New Zealand only as the second single off his eighth studio album, Fuse (2013), and became a top-40 hit in both territories.

== Content ==
"Shame" is a mid-tempo ballad influenced by country pop and pop rock with a duration of three minutes and three seconds. Its instrumentation primarily features the guitar and vocals, with additional looping synths. Its lyrics are confessional, with the narrator detailing his flaws and mistakes between chants of "shame on me, shame on me." It is the only song on Fuse and one of few songs Urban has recorded in which there is only one vocal track, as opposed to the layered vocals and harmonies typical in his work, as the producers insisted the song's message would come through more clearly with a stripped-down arrangement.

== Background and release ==
The song was written by Mikkel Erikson, Tor Erik Hermansen, Benjamin Levine, Ammar Malik, Dan Omelio, Ross Golan, and Justin Parker, and was produced by Keith Urban along with the former three under their respective production monikers Stargate (Erikson and Hermansen) and Benny Blanco (Levine). Though not typically associated with country music, these producers were selected by Urban to work on the album because of their abilities as multi-instrumentalists and to create a more diverse musical sound. Stargate pitched the song to Urban, and Hermansen conceived of the idea of a single vocal track, insisting the story could be conveyed more honestly that way.

In May 2013, Urban released "Little Bit of Everything" as the lead single for his then-upcoming album Fuse, which spent one week on the ARIA charts at number 40. "Shame" was released in August 2013 as the album's second official single, but only in Oceania. The Miranda Lambert duet, "We Were Us", was released in September of that year as the album's second single in most other territories.

== Personnel ==
From Fuse liner notes.

- Benny Blanco — instrumentation, programming
- Ammar Malik — bass guitar
- Stargate — instrumentation, programming
- Keith Urban — ganjo, electric guitar

== Chart performance ==
"Shame" entered the ARIA Top 100 Singles Chart at number 50 for the week of 3 September 2013, and rose to its peak position of 35 the following week.

Chart (2014)	Peak position
Australia (ARIA)	35
New Zealand (Recorded Music NZ)	32
