= In the City (Kevin Rudolf album) =

Studio album by Kevin Rudolf
- Released: November 24, 2008
- Recorded: 2007–2008
- Genres: Pop rock; rap rock; hip hop; electronic rock
- Length: 43:46
- Labels: Cash Money; Universal Republic
- Producers: Bryan "Baby" Williams (exec.); Ronald "Slim" Williams (exec.); Kevin Rudolf; Chad Hugo

Kevin Rudolf chronology
Binocular (2001)	In the City (2008)	To the Sky (2010)

Singles from In the City
- 1. "Let It Rock" Released: July 29, 2008; 2. "Welcome to the World" Released: February 10, 2009

In the City is the second studio album by American singer-songwriter Kevin Rudolf, and second overall after his 2001 debut as Binocular. It was released nationwide, physically and digitally, on November 24, 2008, via Cash Money Records and Universal Republic. Every song on the album was produced and written by Rudolf. "She Can Get It" was a production collaboration between Rudolf and Chad Hugo of the Neptunes. "Let It Rock" was the first single released from the album. The song "NYC" was featured on an episode of CSI: NY and "Let It Rock" was featured on the Melrose Place pilot and The Hills as well as being featured as the theme song for the 2009 WWE Royal Rumble. The album has sold 102,000 copies in the US.

The album's first single, "Let It Rock" reached number 2 on the Canadian Hot 100, number 5 on the U.S. Billboard Hot 100, number 3 on the Australian ARIA charts and number 4 on the Irish Singles Chart.

"Welcome to the World", the version featuring Kid Cudi, is the second single released in February 2009, and reached number 58 on the US Hot 100 and peaked at number 42 on Australia's Aria Singles Chart.

== Promotion ==
On February 25, 2009, Kevin Rudolf announced a 22-city U.S. tour with Hyper Crush, Cash Cash, the Audition and Go Crash Audio as supporting acts, alongside local acts during each stop of the tour beginning in Nashville's Rocketown venue and finishing at Baltimore's Sonar Nightclub.

== Critical reception ==
Professional ratings
Aggregate scores
Source	Rating
Metacritic	53/100
Review scores
Source	Rating
AllMusic	3/5 stars
Artistdirect	3.5/5 stars
Billboard	favorable
Entertainment Weekly	B+
The Guardian	3/5 stars
Pitchfork	2.7/10
PopMatters	4/10 stars
RapReviews	6/10 stars
Rolling Stone	2.5/5 stars

In the City was met with "mixed or average" reviews from critics. At Metacritic, which assigns a weighted average rating out of 100 to reviews from mainstream publications, the album received an average score of 53 based on 9 reviews.

Mikael Wood from Entertainment Weekly said that Rudolf "steps out with a weirdly infectious debut that mixes his rap-track know-how with his love of guitar-god theatrics. (Think "Beat It", not Limp Bizkit.)" Billboard writer Gary Graff noted how the record consisted of songs ranging from the "thumping, synthesizer-heavy club anthems" found in the featured rap collaborations to the more "mellower moments ("I Song", "Scarred")". He concluded that the closing track "Great Escape" "displays some of the chops that could ultimately separate him from the pack." AllMusic's David Jeffries highlighted the Lil Wayne and Rick Ross-featured tracks but felt the album overall was filled with "cringe-worthy" lyrics and "so-so filler", concluding that: "In the City gets by on hooks and hugeness, like an irony-free Andrew W.K., Timbaland working with Aerosmith, or a jaded version of the Jonas Brothers now willing to drop the F-bomb." Alex Sheremet of RapReviews wrote that: "In the City offers good production, excellent melodies, and – of course – the same song, idea(s), and kinds of guest appearances many times over. Still, I'd recommend it as a blueprint for potential. It's also good to enjoy on a visceral level, if you're interested in that sort of thing."

Rolling Stone's Christian Hoard said that despite the Lil Wayne-assisted single, he found the rest of Rudolf's debut to be "a middling rock record dressed up in sleek digital clothes." Evan Sawdey from PopMatters was critical of Rudolf's clumsy lyrical output on being above the dark side of achieving fame and celebrity culture, showing "very little musical variation" beyond the "Let It Rock" formula and felt the "token acoustic tracks ("I Song" and "Scarred")" were interchangeable from each other, concluding that: "If anything, Rudolf does show promise beyond that of just a simple studio session man. He has some solid ideas and keen sense of production; the problem is that his solo songs, by and large, suffer from a frightening lack of creativity and a remarkably shallow lyrical outlook." Pitchfork contributor Ian Cohen panned In the City for taking the dumb parts of "80s corporate rock" without any sense of fun and having "little indication it was constructed by real people in real time." He concluded by sarcastically writing: "But just in case you're taking a half-full approach to Rebirth, you might want to hear this first."

== Track listing ==
All tracks produced by Kevin Rudolf; track 10 co-produced by the Neptunes.

Standard edition
No.	Title	Writer(s)	Length
1.	"In the City"	Kevin Rudolf	3:25
2.	"Let It Rock" (featuring Lil Wayne)	Rudolf; Dwayne Carter	3:51
3.	"I Song"	Rudolf; Jacob Kasher; Ivan Corraliza	3:15
4.	"Livin' It Up"	Rudolf; Kasher; Charles D. Anderson	2:55
5.	"N.Y.C." (featuring Nas)	Rudolf; Kasher; Nasir Jones; Joshua Berkman	3:08
6.	"No Way Out"	Rudolf; Kasher; Brian Reid	3:24
7.	"Scarred"	Rudolf; Kasher	4:17
8.	"Welcome to the World" (featuring Rick Ross)	Rudolf; Kasher; Corraliza; William Roberts	3:03
9.	"Coffee and Donuts"	Rudolf; Berkman	3:16
10.	"She Can Get It"	Rudolf; Kasher; Chad Hugo	2:59
11.	"Gimme a Sign"	Rudolf; Corraliza	3:48
12.	"Great Escape"	Rudolf; Kasher; Reid; Cher London	6:38

iTunes bonus tracks
No.	Title	Writer(s)	Length
13.	"Without You"	Rudolf; Corraliza	3:22
14.	"Tennessee" (featuring Birdman)	Rudolf; Corraliza; George Martinez; Brian Williams	3:26

== Chart performance ==
Chart (2008)	Peak position
U.S. Billboard 200	94
Canadian Albums Chart	74
