= Hyper Crush =

American electro-hip hop group

- Valentine, Ridge, and Fontaine performing at the Never Say Never Festival in 2011

Background information
- Origin: Los Angeles, California, United States
- Genres: Electro, hip hop, electropop, hip house
- Years active: 2006–2016; 2020–present
- Labels: Universal Motown (2008–2010); Night Wave Records (since 2010)
- Members: Donny Fontaine; Holly Valentine; Preston Moronie
- Website: hypercrush.com

Hyper Crush is an American electro-hip hop group from Los Angeles, California, consisting of rapper Donny Fontaine, singer Holly Valentine, and DJ/keytarist Preston Moronie.

== Background ==
=== Early career (2006–2007) ===
Hyper Crush, composed of three former Agoura High School students, began with Donny Fontaine (born Steven Gone) and Preston Moronie (born Patrick Ridge). The duo started out as a Doo-wop group named the Bel-Airs, but their name, musical style, and appearance changed later to reflect their interest in electronic and synth-based music from the 1980s. When they sought a female vocalist to go along with Fontaine, their long-time friend Holly Valentine (born Angelina Araya) took the job.

The group first gained widespread exposure through their Myspace page. They began playing shows in Los Angeles and other places in and around California. In late 2007, they released their debut, Mixtape Volume 1, which contained 31 original Hyper Crush songs. Along with the mixtape, they also released independently-made music videos for "The DeLorean" and "Slow Motion".

Both musically and in their appearance, Hyper Crush makes copious references to the decades of the 1950s and the 1980s. Common examples of these references include the Nintendo, popular arcade games from the 1980s, Technicolor, Hypercolor clothing, the DeLorean, and Sega Genesis. Sounds from Nintendo's Duck Hunt game begin the song "The Arcade" and music from The Legend of Zelda end it. In addition, their fans are called "The Zapper Gun Gang," which is derived from an NES Zapper reference made in the lyrics of "The Arcade." During live performances, Fontaine often wields a modified laser shooting version of the 1989 Nintendo Power Glove.

=== The Arcade (2008) ===
The Arcade, released on May 1, 2008, was the debut album of Hyper Crush, and the follow-up to Mixtape Volume 1. The album featured 13 songs, 2 of which had been previously released on the mixtape.

At the CD release party hosted by Hyper Crush, they also premiered the video for "The Arcade", the title track of the album, although it was not put online and made viewable to the public until June 30. The video was a joint project of Six29 Entertainment and A hill Productions and was directed by Mickey Finnegan. It was Hyper Crush's third video, but the first one to be professionally done.

=== Signing with Universal Motown & Mixtape Vol. 2 (2008–2011) ===
In early November 2008, Hyper Crush signed with Universal Motown. They said in a 2008 interview for BVTV (Bella Vista High School in California) that they had a new album coming out and it was "almost done." It was mentioned that since their first album was independently released, they would re-use about 8 of the songs from The Arcade and the rest of the new album would be new songs. They also stated that they don't have a final name for the new album, then added, perhaps facetiously, that Bella Vista Rocks The Arcade was the working title. In another BVTV interview, in 2009, the band said they were still "mixing down" the album and hoping for a release that summer.

Hyper Crush released the video for "Robo Tech" in late February 2009. This was their fourth video and second video to be professionally done. It was directed by Mickey Finnegan, as was "The Arcade".

The delays in releasing their second album incited the band to release some material through a different channel, and they released their second mixtape on the Internet on June 26, 2009. Valentine spoke about the mixtape: "We wanted to make something cool to put out, especially because our album seems like it's taking long to people... We were like, 'Okay, it's hard to put the album out so we're gonna put out a 21-song mixtape.' Making new music is important to us and we want to give that to our fans."

Hyper Crush released the first single off their upcoming album on September 17, 2009, titled "Keep Up" with Tommy Henriksen co-producing and co-writing the track with Hyper Crush. On May 21, 2010, the group held a video premiere party at The Roxy for "Keep Up," openly inviting fans to join them via Twitter. They released the second single "Ayo" featuring Diplo along with a music video featuring tour footage. The third single "Kick Us Out" was released on November 3, 2010 and peaked at number 6 on the Billboard Dance/Club Play chart. The music video premiered on Vevo on March 16, 2011.

=== Night Wave Records: Night Wave and Vertigo (2011–2016) ===
The cover art for their fourth single, "Fingers Up," was released on their website on June 6, 2011 and the actual single was released around midnight on June 8, 2011 and samples "Derb" by DJ Derb.

Starting on July 1, 2011, the group began a summer-long series titled "Free Song Friday." Similar to Kanye West's GOOD Fridays, Hyper Crush released a new free song, sometimes accompanied by a new music video, every Friday. A list of giveaways in chronological order include: "MBCCD," a remix of She Wants Revenge's "Must Be the One," "Rockstar," "Flip The Switch" and its music video, a "Flip The Switch" remix, and "Maniac" along with its music video.

The group left their record label Universal Motown, to form their own independent label, Night Wave Records. Under their new label, they released the single for "Werk Me" on October 17, 2011. The video for "Werk Me" premiered on the front page of Vevo months later on January 10, 2012. Their second studio album, Night Wave was the first to be released on Night Wave Records and is available for download on iTunes.

Their third album, "Vertigo", was released on October 15, 2013. It contains the first single "Visions of Coleco" and the moderate hit single "Rage", along with 8 more tracks.

After three years without any news, on March 31, 2016 Hyper Crush posted a video on their YouTube channel which shows all three members of the group working on a new album. On June 21, 2016 they released a new song called "Dizzy".

=== Repeat and the new album (2020) ===
After three more years out of the music scene, in July 2019 Hyper Crush announced through their Instagram account that they're planning to drop a new record, marking their official comeback. On 1. January 2020, they announced that they will release a whole new album.

On September 25, 2020, Hyper Crush released the single "Repeat" on several streaming services and published a music video. The new video was shot through Preston's video production company, Ridge Production.

On December 22, 2020, the single "No Sweat" was released by Hyper Crush on YouTube and Spotify.

== Tours ==
Hyper Crush has toured with bands such as The Medic Droid, Millionaires, Brokencyde, J0HNNY, Karate High School, Chronic Future, And Then There Were None, The Arrival, and Lisa D'Amato.

Hyper Crush toured with Kevin Rudolf in spring 2009. The second half of the tour was cancelled for unknown reasons.

They also toured the US at the end of 2008 with The Medic Droid as headliners and Chronic Future supporting. They toured in spring 2009 supporting Kevin Rudolf, alongside Cash Cash, The Audition, and Go Crash Audio. Hyper Crush toured the West Coast of the US on the "We Make It Rain" tour with Brokencyde and Karate High School. They also covered this area on the "Electrik Party Tour across America" with J0HNNY. In May, 2009, Hyper Crush performed at The Bamboozle.

In July 2009, Hyper Crush toured in Europe as the opening act for Lady Gaga.

Hyper Crush supported Breathe Carolina on the No Checkpoints In The Jungle tour in February 2010. The tour also included Let's Get It, Queen's Club, and The Spin Cycle.

In August 2010, Hyper Crush co-headlined the Lazertag Tour with Far East Movement with music by DJ EYE and special guests The Cataracs and Dev.

== Video games ==
A preview of Moronie's character in Hyper Crush: The 8-Bit Adventure

Near the end of 2010 it was revealed that Michael Wagner, a fan of the group, and Voxel Software were working on an 8-bit iPhone game titled Hyper Crush: The 8-Bit Adventure. Fontaine, Valentine, and Moronie are featured as playable characters with their own personal weapons: Power Glove, Zapper Gun and Keytar, respectively. The game contains eight levels that increase in difficulty and the controls are modeled after the iconic NES controller. Being avid Android fans, the group stated that "If the game does well in the App store we'll bring it over into the Android Market." The game was released on August 19, 2011. Their song "Keep Up" can also be played on the iPhone, iPad, and iPod Touch through the game Tap Tap Revenge 3.

== Other appearances ==
The group has had many of their songs featured on MTV reality shows, such as Bromance, The Hills and The Real World. Songs of theirs can also be heard in the prologue episodes of the web-series, LG15: The Resistance. In 2009, Valentine modeled the Lowrider Headphones for Skullcandy and went on to collaborate with T.I.T.S. (Two In The Shirt) Brand in 2011 to create their "TITS x HOLLY FROM HYPERCRUSH" line of t-shirts. "Keep Up" was chosen to be the official song of the 2011 Alt Games, and the group took stage immediately after the Flowboarding Finals for a live performance.

== Discography ==
=== Albums and mixtapes ===
List of albums and mixtapes
Title	Album details
Mixtape Volume 1	Released: August 31, 2007; Label: Self-released
The Arcade	Released: May 1, 2008; Label: Self-released
Mixtape Volume 2	Released: June 26, 2009; Label: New Wave
Hyper Crush Presents Crushmas Mix	Released: November 29, 2010; Label: Self-released
Night Wave	Released: February 7, 2012; Label: Night Wave Records
Vertigo	Released: October 15, 2013; Label: Night Wave Records

=== Singles ===
List of singles
Title	Release date	Album
"The Arcade"	June 29, 2008	The Arcade
"Robo Tech"	February 19, 2009	The Arcade
"Sex & Drugs" (Benny Benassi Remix)	July 28, 2009	The Arcade
"Keep Up"	November 17, 2009	Non-album singles
"Ayo"	August 17, 2010	Non-album singles
"Kick Us Out"	November 3, 2010	Non-album singles
"Fingers Up"	June 8, 2011	Night Wave
"MBCCD"	July 1, 2011	Non-album singles
"Rockstar"	July 19, 2011	Non-album singles
"Flip the Switch"	July 22, 2011	Night Wave
"Maniac"	August 5, 2011	Night Wave
"Werk Me"	October 17, 2011	Night Wave
"Visions of Coleco"	March 19, 2013	Vertigo
"Rage"	July 2, 2013	Vertigo
"Dizzy"	June 21, 2016	Non-album single
"Repeat"	September 25, 2020	Non-album single

=== As featured artist ===
List of single appearances as featured artist
Title	Year	Album
"Too High" (Filip Filipi featuring Hyper Crush, Christian Rich & Slush Puppy Kids)	2010	Design and Origin of Stars
"Heartbeat" (Disco Fries featuring Jeremy Carr & Hyper Crush)	2012	Non-album single

=== Remixes ===
List of remixed singles
Title	Year
"La La La" by LMFAO	2009
"Bulletproof" by La Roux	2010
"Over" by Drake	2010
"I Made It" by Kevin Rudolf	2010
"California Gurls" by Katy Perry	2010
"DJ Got Us Fallin' in Love" by Usher (featuring Pitbull)	2010
"Kick Us Out" by Hyper Crush	2010
"Tonight (I'm Fuckin' You)" by Enrique Iglesias (featuring Sky Blu of LMFAO)	2010
"Must Be The One" by She Wants Revenge	2011
"Somebody That I Used to Know" by Gotye	2012
"I Love It" by Icona Pop	2013

=== Music videos ===
List of music videos
Title	Year	Director
"The DeLorean"	2007	Hyper Crush
"Slow Motion"	2007	Hyper Crush
"The Arcade"	2008	Mickey Finnegan
"Robo Tech"	2009	Mickey Finnegan
"Keep Up"	2009	Justin Krook
"Ayo"	2010	Michael Beck
"Kick Us Out"	2011	Jonathan Lia
"Flip the Switch"	2011	Hyper Crush
"Maniac"	2011	Cassidy Sanders, Hyper Crush
"Werk Me"	2012	Cassidy Sanders
"Chead"	2012	Alex 2Tone
"Bad Boyz"	2012	Alex 2Tone
"WTF"	2012	Alex 2Tone
"Visions of Coleco"	2013	Cassidy Sanders
"Rage"	2013	Cassidy Sanders
