= We Were Us =

Single by Keith Urban with Miranda Lambert

from the album Fuse
- Released: 16 September 2013
- Recorded: 2013
- Genre: Country
- Length: 3:11
- Label: Hit Red; Capitol Nashville
- Songwriters: Nicolle Galyon; Jimmy Robbins; Jon Nite
- Producers: Keith Urban; Nathan Chapman

Keith Urban singles chronology
| "Shame" (2013) | "We Were Us" (2013) | "Cop Car" (2014) |

Miranda Lambert singles chronology
| "All Kinds of Kinds" (2013) | "We Were Us" (2013) | "Automatic" (2014) |

"We Were Us" is a song written by Nicolle Galyon, Jimmy Robbins, and Jon Nite and recorded by Australian country music singer Keith Urban as a duet with American country music singer Miranda Lambert. It was released in September 2013 as the second international single and third overall from Urban's 2013 album Fuse.

== Content ==
The song is the narrators' reminiscence of lost love. Lambert sings the first verse, Urban sings the second verse, and both sing the choruses and bridge together. The song is set in the key of D major with a vocal range of A_{3}–A_{5}.

== Critical reception ==
Giving it 4 out of 5 stars, Matt Bjorke of Roughstock compared its theme favorably to "Springsteen" by Eric Church, and praised the blending of Urban's and Lambert's voices, although he criticized the production as "a bit too busy and loud".

"We Were Us" won Musical Event of the Year at the 2014 CMA Awards.

== Music video ==
The music video was directed by Reid Long and Becky Fluke and premiered in November 2013.

== Commercial performance ==
The song debuted at number 49 on Country Airplay for the week ending 21 September 2013. The next week, it climbed to number 29, while debuting at 24 on Hot Country Songs. Its chart run has overlapped with Lambert's single "All Kinds of Kinds", the fifth from her album Four the Record. The song has sold 566,000 copies in the US as of January 2014. This would be Keith's last top 30 hit on the Billboard Hot 100 until "Blue Ain't Your Color" in 2016.

== Personnel ==
From liner notes to Fuse:

- Nathan Chapman — drum programming, bass guitar, acoustic guitar, keyboards
- Miranda Lambert — vocals
- Keith Urban — vocals, acoustic guitar, electric guitar, ganjo

== Charts and certifications ==
=== Weekly charts ===
| Chart (2013–2014) | Peak position |
|---|---|
| Canada Hot 100 (Billboard) | 25 |
| Canada Country (Billboard) | 2 |
| US Billboard Hot 100 | 26 |
| US Country Airplay (Billboard) | 1 |
| US Hot Country Songs (Billboard) | 1 |

=== Year-end charts ===
| Chart (2013) | Position |
|---|---|
| US Country Airplay (Billboard) | 57 |
| US Hot Country Songs (Billboard) | 62 |

| Chart (2014) | Position |
|---|---|
| US Country Airplay (Billboard) | 72 |
| US Hot Country Songs (Billboard) | 64 |

=== Certifications ===
| Region | Certification | Certified units/sales |
|---|---|---|
| Canada (Music Canada) | Gold | 40,000^{*} |
| United States (RIAA) | Platinum | 1,000,000^{‡} |
^{*} Sales figures based on certification alone.^{‡} Sales+streaming figures based on certification alone.
