= Night Wave =

Album by Hyper Crush

Studio album by Hyper Crush
- Released: February 7, 2012
- Genre: Electropop
- Length: 39:08
- Label: Night Wave Records

Hyper Crush chronology
The Arcade (2008)	Night Wave (2012)	Vertigo (2013)

Singles from Night Wave
- 1. "Fingers Up" Released: June 8, 2011; 2. "Flip the Switch" Released: July 22, 2011; 3. "Maniac" Released: August 5, 2011; 4. "Werk Me" Released: October 17, 2011

Night Wave is the second studio album by Los Angeles-based electrohop group Hyper Crush, released on the iTunes Store on February 7, 2012. It was self-published by Night Wave Records after the group left its previous record label, Universal Motown, because it "really didn’t see eye to eye with them for a long time". The album consists of eleven songs, four previously released as singles. Three were cowritten and coproduced, and eight written and produced by Hyper Crush.

== Promotion ==
A trailer created by Cassidy Sanders for the album was released January 17, 2012 featuring "What Goes Up". To generate hype and boost their pre-order numbers, free physical copies of the album were sent to fans who pre-ordered the album. Another promotional giveaway occurred during their official album release party, which was held at The Roxy Theatre on February 3, 2012. The CD was later available to buy on their website. They also released videos for "WTF", "Chead" and "Bad Boyz".

== Singles ==
"Fingers Up", "Flip The Switch", "Maniac" and their music videos were all released for free during the summer-long series titled "Free Song Friday". The single for "Werk Me" was released on October 17, 2011, and its video premiered on the front page of Vevo on January 10, 2012.

== Track listing ==
This is the official track list, however on the CD, "WTF" is track 7 and "What Goes Up" is track 6 despite being listed otherwise on the back cover.

No.	Title	Writer(s)	Length
1.	"Werk Me"	Steven Love, Patrick Ridge & Angelina Araya	3:50
2.	"Chrome Pipes"	Steven Love, Patrick Ridge & Angelina Araya	3:05
3.	"Bad Boyz"	Oliver Goldstein, Steven Love, Patrick Ridge & Angelina Araya	3:12
4.	"Fingers Up"	Steven Love, Patrick Ridge & Angelina Araya	3:46
5.	"Cheap Thrills"	Steven Love, Patrick Ridge & Angelina Araya	4:20
6.	"WTF"	Steven Love, Patrick Ridge & Angelina Araya	3:19
7.	"What Goes Up"	Steven Love, Patrick Ridge & Angelina Araya	3:43
8.	"Maniac"	Steven Love, Patrick Ridge, Angelina Araya & John Feldman	3:27
9.	"Chead"	Steven Love, Patrick Ridge & Angelina Araya	3:32
10.	"Flip The Switch"	Steven Love, Patrick Ridge, Angelina Araya & Matt Shwartz	3:21
11.	"The Foundation"	Steven Love, Patrick Ridge & Angelina Araya	3:33
Total length:			39:08
