= Somewhere in My Car =

Single by Keith Urban

from the album Fuse
- Released: 23 June 2014
- Recorded: 2013
- Genre: Country pop; pop rock
- Length: 3:56 (album version); 3:17 (radio edit)
- Label: Hit Red; Capitol Nashville
- Songwriters: Keith Urban; J. T. Harding
- Producers: Dann Huff; Keith Urban

Keith Urban singles chronology
"Cop Car" (2014)	"Somewhere in My Car" (2014)	"Raise 'Em Up" (2015)

"Somewhere in My Car" is a song co-written and recorded by Australian country music singer Keith Urban. It was released in June 2014 as the fourth international single and fifth overall from his 2013 album Fuse. In December 2014, it became Urban's sixteenth number one single on the Country Airplay chart. Urban wrote this song with J. T. Harding.

== Content ==
"Somewhere in My Car" is an uptempo, guitar-driven breakup song about a male recalling a failed relationship and wishing that he and his lover were "somewhere in [his] car". The song is set in the key of B♭ major with a main chord pattern of E♭5–B♭5–E♭/G-Gm–Fsus-F, and Urban's vocals range from F_{3} to G_{4}.

== Critical reception ==
Country music blog Taste of Country described the song favorably: "One can’t ignore his guitar solo. It screams ’80s rock, while the rest of the song is distinctively modern. The new 'modern' comes with a strong ’80s influence, however, and 'Somewhere in My Car' rides blissfully along in that niche." Giving it an "A", Bob Paxman of Country Weekly wrote that "Keith [Urban] goes on to deliver the goods in a song that deftly mashes lyrical content with instrumentation to create the overall mood." He also praised the use of a wah-wah pedal on the solo, as well as Urban's singing voice.

== Chart performance ==
"Somewhere in My Car" debuted on US Billboard's Country Digital Songs chart at number 42 when the album Fuse was released in September 2013. After it was chosen as a single in June 2014, the song entered the US Country Airplay chart at number 59 the same week, and appeared on the Hot Country Songs chart a month later. As the song gained airplay, the song debuted at number 91 on the US Billboard Hot 100 chart on September 13, 2014. It reached its peak at number one on the Country Airplay chart and number 49 on the Billboard Hot 100 chart for the week of December 6, 2014. As of February 2015, the song has sold 450,000 copies in the US. On August 16, 2019, the single was certified platinum by the Recording Industry Association of America (RIAA) for combined sales and streaming data of over a million units in the United States.

The song debuted at number 32 on the Canadian Hot 100 chart when the album Fuse was released in September 2013. It reached number four on the Canada Country chart in November 2014.

== Music video ==
The music video was directed by John Urbano and premiered in September 2014.

== Personnel ==
Adapted from Fuse liner notes.

- J. Bonilla — programming
- Dann Huff — electric guitar, acoustic guitar
- Tony Lucido — bass guitar
- Matt Mahaffey — keyboards, drums
- Russell Terrell — background vocals
- Keith Urban — all vocals, ganjo, electric guitar, slide guitar, EBow, piano

== Charts ==
=== Weekly charts ===
Chart (2014–2015)	Peak position
Canada Hot 100 (Billboard)	32
Canada Country (Billboard)	4
US Billboard Hot 100	49
US Country Airplay (Billboard)	1
US Hot Country Songs (Billboard)	3

=== Year-end charts ===
Chart (2014)	Position
US Country Airplay (Billboard)	44
US Hot Country Songs (Billboard)	46

Chart (2015)	Position
US Country Airplay (Billboard)	81
US Hot Country Songs (Billboard)	82

== Certifications ==
Region	Certification	Certified units/sales
United States (RIAA)	Platinum	1,000,000^{‡}
^{‡} Sales+streaming figures based on certification alone.
