= You Make the Rain Fall =

Single by Kevin Rudolf featuring Flo Rida

from the album To the Sky
- Released: September 14, 2010
- Recorded: 2010
- Genre: Hip-hop; rap rock; electronic rock
- Length: 2:54
- Label: Cash Money; Universal Republic
- Songwriters: Kevin Rudolf; Tramar Dillard; Erik-Michael Estrada; Jeff Halavacs; Jacob Kasher Hindlin; Allan Grigg; Lukasz Gottwald
- Producers: Kevin Rudolf; Joshua Berkman; Dr. Luke

Kevin Rudolf singles chronology
| "I Made It (Cash Money Heroes)" (2010) | "You Make the Rain Fall" (2010) | "Don't Give Up" (2012) |

Flo Rida singles chronology
| "IYiYi" (2010) | "You Make the Rain Fall" (2010) | "Boom Shacka" (2010) |

Music video
- "You Make the Rain Fall" on YouTube

"You Make the Rain Fall" is the second single from American singer Kevin Rudolf's second studio album To the Sky. The song features American rapper Flo Rida and is produced by Dr. Luke. It was released on September 14, 2010, and received airplay on AOL Radio's New Pop First Radio station and MuchMusic.

== Music video ==
The music video for "You Make the Rain Fall" was premiered on Rudolf's Vevo account on August 27, 2010.

== Usage in media ==
It also served as the theme song for season 3 of WWE NXT.

== Chart performance ==
"You Make the Rain Fall" debuted at number 94 on the Canadian Hot 100 on July 3, 2010, (it appeared on the chart as a non-single), and dropped off the chart after one week. On the week of September 18, 2010, the song re-entered the chart at number 99, and later climbed to number 59.

| Chart (2010) | Peak position |
|---|---|
| Canada Hot 100 (Billboard) | 59 |

== Release history ==
Release dates and formats for "You Make the Rain Fall"
| Region | Date | Format | Label(s) | Ref. |
|---|---|---|---|---|
| United States | August 17, 2010 | Mainstream airplay | Universal Republic | |
