= Cop Car (Keith Urban song) =

2014 single by Keith Urban

Single by Keith Urban

from the album Fuse
- Released: 13 January 2014
- Recorded: 2013
- Genre: Country rock
- Length: 4:16
- Label: Hit Red; Capitol Nashville
- Songwriters: Zach Crowell; Sam Hunt; Matt Jenkins
- Producers: Zach Crowell; Keith Urban

Keith Urban singles chronology
"We Were Us" (2013)	"Cop Car" (2014)	"Somewhere in My Car" (2014)

Music video
- "Cop Car" on YouTube

"Cop Car" is a song written by Zach Crowell, Sam Hunt, and Matt Jenkins and recorded by Australian country music singer Keith Urban. It was released in January 2014 as the third international single and fourth overall from Urban's 2013 album Fuse.

== Content ==
The song is a mid-tempo ballad about two young lovers who are arrested when trespassing together, and "f[a]ll in love in the back of a cop car". The song was inspired by a real-life story that happened with Sam Hunt and his now wife, Hannah.

== Critical reception ==
Joseph Hudak of Country Weekly gave the song a B+ grade, saying that "[it]t's a clever concept, elevated to near greatness by its sheer originality". He praised Urban's "earnest" vocals, and said that "the production is slick and alive—though not necessarily squarely 'country'". Kevin John Coyne of Country Universe gave it an identical rating, saying that he did not believe its storyline, but said that "Keith Urban's heartfelt delivery and careful choice of what lines to emphasize keep the proceedings grounded. He's so effective at capturing the feeling of falling in love that the specifics of the event surrounding the moment are appropriately secondary to the emotions at play". Thom Jurek of AllMusic wrote that "[t]he muted drum loop that fuels the shimmering 'Cop Car', is layered in atmospherics worthy of Achtung Baby, but the melody is pure country".

The song was nominated for Best Country Solo Performance at the 57th Grammy Awards but lost to Carrie Underwood's "Something in the Water".

== Chart performance ==
"Cop Car" peaked at number eight on the US Billboard Country Airplay chart in May 2014, making it his lowest-peaking single on that chart since 1999. As of June 2014, the song has sold 772,000 copies in the US. On June 20, 2014, the single was certified platinum by the Recording Industry Association of America (RIAA) for sales of over a million digital units in the United States.

== Music video ==
The music video was directed by John Urbano and premiered in January 2014.

== Personnel ==
Compiled from liner notes.

- Zach Crowell — programming, electric guitar, acoustic guitar, bass guitar, piano, percussion, synthesizer, background vocals
- John Fields — bass guitar
- Devin Malone — dobro, pedal steel guitar, electric guitar
- Chris McHugh — drums
- Russell Terrell — background vocals
- Keith Urban — all vocals, electric guitar, EBow

== Charts ==
=== Weekly charts ===
Chart (2014)	Peak position
Canada Hot 100 (Billboard)	38
Canada Country (Billboard)	5
US Billboard Hot 100	41
US Country Airplay (Billboard)	8
US Hot Country Songs (Billboard)	4

=== Year-end charts ===
Chart (2014)	Position
US Country Airplay (Billboard)	52
US Hot Country Songs (Billboard)	27

== Certifications ==
Region	Certification	Certified units/sales
Australia (ARIA)	Gold	35,000^{‡}
United States (RIAA)	2× Platinum	2,000,000^{‡}
^{‡} Sales+streaming figures based on certification alone.

== Sam Hunt version ==
"Cop Car"

Song by Sam Hunt

from the album Montevallo
- Released: October 27, 2014
- Recorded: 2014
- Genre: Country pop
- Length: 4:13
- Label: MCA Nashville
- Songwriters: Zach Crowell; Sam Hunt; Matt Jenkins
- Producers: Zach Crowell; Shane McAnally

Audio video
- "Cop Car" on YouTube

Sam Hunt—who co-wrote the song originally—recorded his version of it on his debut studio album Montevallo, which was released on October 27, 2014.

Hunt explains that the reason he included the song on his album is because "After writing the songs on the record, it was like a movie, and "Cop Car" was a pivotal scene in that movie. Even though Keith Urban had recorded it, I felt it still had a place on the record".

=== Chart performance ===
Chart (2014)	Peak position
US Country Digital Songs	48

=== Certifications ===
Region	Certification	Certified units/sales
Canada (Music Canada)	Gold	40,000^{‡}
United States (RIAA)	Gold	500,000^{‡}
^{‡} Sales+streaming figures based on certification alone.
