= To the Sky =

Studio album by Kevin Rudolf
- Released: June 11, 2010
- Recorded: 2009–2010
- Genres: Pop rock, rap rock
- Length: 36:59
- Label: Cash Money
- Producers: Kevin Rudolf and Joshua Berkman

Kevin Rudolf chronology
In the City (2008)	To the Sky (2010)	Against the Wall (Vol. 1) (2024)

Singles from To the Sky
- 1. "I Made It (Cash Money Heroes)" Released: February 2, 2010; 2. "You Make the Rain Fall" Released: September 14, 2010

To the Sky is the third studio album by American singer-songwriter Kevin Rudolf. It was released on June 15, 2010, in the United States by Cash Money Records, Island Records and Universal Republic Records.

== Background ==
Rudolf has said that he embraced dance music saying, "it's like most of it up-tempo, most of it electropop rock hip-hop stuff". The album features mostly guitar heavy beats.

== Guests ==
Kevin Rudolf confirmed collaborations from Birdman, Lil Wayne, Jay Sean, Rivers Cuomo from Weezer, and Three 6 Mafia in an interview with Rap-Up. Kevin has stated that he wanted to do a duet with Jay-Z and Kanye West on the album. Lil Wayne appears on the tracks "I Made It" and "Spit in Your Face," a reworked version of a Lil Wayne song which had leaked about a year prior to the album's release. That song was original slated to be on Lil Wayne's album Rebirth. Wayne raps on all of the verses. He wanted Natasha Bedingfield to be on the album, but was unable to find a suitable song. He also wanted to work with Sade on the album. In an interview, Vibe listed Flo Rida as a feature on the album.

== Production and songwriting ==
Kevin Rudolf and Joshua Berkman were the primary producer for all tracks. The songwriters for this album are Kevin Rudolf, Jacob Kasher, Jeff Halavacs, Eric Estrada, Jerome Skaller, Robert Larow, Jerome Skaller,Kamaljit Jhooti, and Dwayne Carter

== Reception ==
=== Critical reception ===
Professional ratings
Review scores
Source	Rating
Allmusic	2.5/5 stars
RapReviews	7/10 stars

To the Sky was met with mixed reviews from music critics. David Jeffries of Allmusic gave the album two and a half stars out of five, saying "A mixed bag for fans to sort through, but without a worthy “Let It Rock" successor, this is hard to recommend over his debut." He described the songs as "generally good". Steve Juon of RapReviews gave the album a seven out of ten, saying "The swagger's been good to him, because not every R&B or rock album would meet with a hardcore hip-hop head's approval, but even without the numerous rap cameos I think "To the Sky" would have been a win to a hip-hop audience – they don't hurt either though. This is "In the City" evolved, with no pun intended, to a higher level."

=== Commercial performance ===
To the Sky debuted on the Billboard 200 at No. 78. The album has sold 20,000 copies in the US.

== Singles ==
The first single released is "I Made It (Cash Money Heroes)". The song features Lil Wayne, Birdman and Jay Sean. The song received chart success in Australia, Canada and the United States. The second single is "You Make the Rain Fall". It also was the theme song for the third season of "NXT". It was released to Mainstream radio September 14, 2010, and features Flo Rida.

== Track listing ==
No.	Title	Writer(s)	Producer(s)	Length
1.	"I Made It (Cash Money Heroes)" (featuring Birdman, Jay Sean & Lil Wayne)	Kevin Rudolf, Jacob Kasher, Kamaljit Jhooti, Robert Larow, Jerome Skaller	Kevin Rudolf	4:10
2.	"You Make the Rain Fall" (featuring Flo Rida)	Kevin Rudolf	Kevin Rudolf Joshua Berkman	2:54
3.	"Don't Cry"	Kevin Rudolf Jacob Kasher	Kevin Rudolf Joshua Berkman	2:52
4.	"Whatchu Waitin' For" (featuring Three 6 Mafia)	Kevin Rudolf, Eric Estrada, Jacob Kasher, Jeff Halavacs	Kevin Rudolf Joshua Berkman	3:16
5.	"Big Timer"	Kevin Rudolf, Jacob Kasher, Eric Estrada	Kevin Rudolf Joshua Berkman	3:19
6.	"I Belong to You (LANY)"	Kevin Rudolf, Jacob Kasher, Jeff Halavacs	Kevin Rudolf Joshua Berkman	3:14
7.	"Must Be Dreamin'" (featuring Rivers Cuomo of Weezer)	Kevin Rudolf Jacob Kasher	Kevin Rudolf Joshua Berkman	3:03
8.	"Spit in Your Face" (featuring Lil Wayne)	Kevin Rudolf Dwayne Carter	Kevin Rudolf Joshua Berkman	4:36
9.	"What Do U Got"	Kevin Rudolf, Jacob Kasher, Jeff Halavacs	Kevin Rudolf Joshua Berkman	3:30
10.	"Late Night Automatic" (featuring Three 6 Mafia)	Kevin Rudolf, Jacob Kasher, Jeff Halavacs	Kevin Rudolf Joshua Berkman	2:47
11.	"Crashing Down"	Kevin Rudolf, Jacob Kasher, Jeff Halavacs	Kevin Rudolf Joshua Berkman	3:26

== Release history ==
List of release dates, with country released and format
Country	Date	Format(s)
Australia	June 11, 2010	CD, LP
United Kingdom	June 14, 2010	CD, LP
United States	June 15, 2010	CD, LP
