= Little Bit of Everything (song) =

Single by Keith Urban

from the album Fuse
- Released: 14 May 2013
- Recorded: 2013
- Genre: Country
- Length: 3:25
- Label: Capitol Nashville
- Songwriters: Brad Warren; Brett Warren; Kevin Rudolf
- Producers: Nathan Chapman; Keith Urban

Keith Urban singles chronology
"For You" (2012)	"Little Bit of Everything" (2013)	"Shame" (2013)

"Little Bit of Everything" is a song written by Brad Warren, Brett Warren, and Kevin Rudolf and recorded by Australian country music singer Keith Urban. It was released in May 2013 as the first single from Urban's 2013 album Fuse. The song became Urban's first Top 40 hit on the US Billboard Hot 100 since "Only You Can Love Me This Way" in 2009.

== Content ==
"Little Bit of Everything" is about a man who expresses "a whole assortment of other desires to live life to its fullest." The song's concept came from a conversation that songwriting duo The Warren Brothers (Brad Warren and Brett Warren) had with Kevin Rudolf over their varied musical interests. According to Brett, the song was sent to Urban, who is friends with the Warren Brothers, but he was initially unaware that they wrote it.

== Composition ==
Unlike on his last five albums, which he co-produced with Dann Huff, Urban co-produced this song with Nathan Chapman. As for the arrangement, Urban said that he found the song interesting because it put less emphasis on the chorus than on the verses, as opposed to most songs, in which the chorus is "kind of bigger." The introduction features a ukulele that was "chopped up" to create a stuttering sound. This part was inspired by Madonna's 2001 single "Don't Tell Me". The bass line is also played on a synthesizer, due to the first two bass guitarists that they contacted being unavailable.

The song is set in the key of A♭ major with a main chord pattern of A♭–D♭–E♭. It has a moderately fast tempo in a 2/2 time signature. Urban's vocals range from E♭_{3} to B♭_{4}.

== Critical reception ==
Billy Dukes of Taste of Country gave the song three and a half stars out of five, writing that Urban "wraps his arms around the spirit of the song and doesn’t try to make it something bigger than a catchy, feel-good, open-road anthem." Matt Bjorke of Roughstock gave the song four stars out of five, saying that it "showcases a pop-leaning sound without abandoning the style that Keith Urban has come to be known for."

== Music video ==
The music video was directed by Isaac Ravishankara and premiered on 25 July 2013.

== Personnel ==
From liner notes to Fuse:

- Nathan Chapman — drum programming, synthesizer bass, ukulele, piano, keyboards
- Kevin Rudolf — guitar riff on chorus
- Keith Urban — all vocals, ganjo, electric guitar, slide guitar, guitar solo

== Chart and sales performance ==
"Little Bit of Everything" debuted at number 30 on the US Billboard Country Airplay chart and number 24 on the US Billboard Hot Country Songs chart for the week of 1 June 2013. It also debuted at number 94 on the US Billboard Hot 100 chart and number 35 on the Canadian Hot 100 chart for the week of 1 June 2013. As of October 2013, the song has sold 561,000 copies in the US.

Chart (2013)	Peak position
Australia (ARIA)	40
Canada Hot 100 (Billboard)	35
Canada Country (Billboard)	1
US Billboard Hot 100	33
US Country Airplay (Billboard)	1
US Hot Country Songs (Billboard)	6

=== Year-end charts ===
Chart (2013)	Position
US Country Airplay (Billboard)	14
US Hot Country Songs (Billboard)	31
US Radio Songs (Billboard)	70

== Certifications ==
Region	Certification	Certified units/sales
Australia (ARIA)	Gold	35,000^{‡}
United States (RIAA)	Platinum	1,000,000^{‡}
^{‡} Sales+streaming figures based on certification alone.
