= Welcome to the World (Kevin Rudolf song) =

2009 song by Kevin Rudolf

Single by Kevin Rudolf featuring Kid Cudi

from the album In the City
- Released: January 10, 2009
- Recorded: 2008
- Genre: Pop rock; alternative hip hop; rap rock
- Length: 3:05 (Album Version); 3:03 (No Rap/Radio Edit)
- Label: Cash Money; Universal Republic
- Songwriter(s): Kevin Rudolf; Jacob Kasher Hindlin; Scott Mescudi; William Roberts; Ivan Corraliza
- Producer(s): Kevin Rudolf

Kevin Rudolf singles chronology
"Let It Rock" (2008)	"Welcome to the World" (2009)	"Shooting Star" (2009)

Kid Cudi singles chronology
"Day 'n' Nite" (2007)	"Welcome to the World" (2009)	"Make Her Say" (2009)

Music video
- "Welcome to the World" on YouTube

"Welcome to the World" is a song by American singer Kevin Rudolf, released by Cash Money and Universal Republic Records as the second single from his debut album In the City. The single version features vocals from American rapper Kid Cudi, who is replaced in favor of Rick Ross on the album version. The chorus takes the melody from the 1994 Oasis single "Supersonic".

The song was used in promotions for WrestleMania XXVI.

== Extended version ==
There is an extended version of the song that features verses from both Kid Cudi and Rick Ross.

== Chart performance ==
"Welcome to the World" peaked at number 34 on the Billboard Pop 100 and number 58 on the Hot 100. In Canada, it reached number 56 on the Canadian Hot 100. It also debuted on Ryan Seacrest's Weekly Top 40 at number 40.

== Music video ==
The music video was released to MTV on May 1, 2009. It uses the no rap edit version of the song. The video shows Rudolf singing in the streets with his band. Lil Wayne and Birdman make a brief appearance in the video.

== Track listing ==
CD Single

1. "Welcome to the World" (Clean) (featuring Kid Cudi) — 3:03
2. "Welcome to the World" (Dirty) (featuring Kid Cudi) — 3:03
3. "Welcome to the World" (Single Version) — 2:38
4. "Welcome to the World" (featuring Rick Ross) — 3:03

== Charts ==
=== Weekly charts ===
Chart (2009)	Peak position
Australia (ARIA)	42
Canada (Canadian Hot 100)	56
Canada CHR/Top 40 (Billboard)	37
Ireland (IRMA)	34
UK Singles (OCC)	77
US Billboard Hot 100	58
US Pop Airplay (Billboard)	26

== Release history ==
Region	Date	Format(s)	Label	Ref.
United States	February 17, 2009	Contemporary hit radio	Universal Republic	
