= Scream (Timbaland song) =

2007 single by Timbaland

Single by Timbaland featuring Keri Hilson and Nicole Scherzinger

from the album Shock Value
- Released: November 10, 2007
- Studio: Hit Factory Criteria (Miami)
- Genre: Electro; hip-hop
- Length: 5:41 (album version); 3:44 (radio edit); 3:51 (video edit)
- Label: Mosley; Blackground; Interscope
- Songwriters: Timothy Mosley; Keri Hilson; Nate Hills
- Producers: Timbaland; Danja

Timbaland singles chronology
"Apologize" (2007)	"Scream" (2007)	"Chop Me Up" (2008)

Keri Hilson singles chronology
"The Way I Are" (2007)	"Scream" (2007)	"Hero" (2008)

Nicole Scherzinger singles chronology
"Baby Love" (2007)	"Scream" (2007)	"Supervillain" (2007)

Music video
- "Scream" on YouTube

"Scream" is a song by American producer and rapper Timbaland, released as the fifth and final single from his second studio album Shock Value (2007). The song features vocals from Nicole Scherzinger of the Pussycat Dolls, and Keri Hilson. Mosley and Hilson co-wrote the song with producer Danja, who co-produced the song with Timbaland. Mosley Music Group, in association with Blackground Records and Interscope Records, serviced the song to mainstream radios in the United States in December 2007.

"Scream" received generally positive reviews from music critics, with a majority of them praising Hilson's vocal performance, while one reviewer deemed Timbaland's vocals as creepy. The song charted moderately, possibly due in part to the continuing success of Timbaland's previous single "Apologize". It peaked within the top ten in countries like New Zealand and Sweden and in the top fifteen tier in countries like Australia and Ireland. Despite being released first in the United States, the song did not chart on the Billboard Hot 100, being his only single in the United States from Shock Value not to do so. The accompanying music video portrays Timbaland being caressed by two other women while Hilson and Scherzinger are in separate scenes performing seductive movements in isolated areas.

== Background ==
"Scream" was written and composed by Timbaland (as Tim Mosley), Danja (as Nate Hills) and Keri Hilson. Mosley and Hills produced the track and provided instrumentation for it with both playing the keyboard and bass while Timbaland plays on the drums. Danja is credited on the song for playing the guitars with musicians Kevin Rudolf and Dan Warner. The song was recorded and programmed by sound engineers Demacio "Demo" Castellon and Marcella "Ms. Lago" Araica at the Hit Factory Criteria in Miami while the two mixed the track at Chalice Recording Studios in Los Angeles. Castellon and Araica were assisted by James Barton in mixing the track while editing for the song was conducted by Ron Taylor using Pro Tools technology. The gospel-tinged song has been described as "funky and seductive" in sound with a sexy groove. Sean Fennessey of Vibe Magazine describes "Scream" as an "alluring", "repetitious" song "with a whirring sexuality." "Scream" is the final single released from Shock Value (2007). Mosley Music Group, in association with Blackground Records and Interscope Records, serviced the song to mainstream radios on December 11, 2007, in the United States. "Scream" was later released around the world between February and March of the following year in digital, extended play and CD single formats.

== Critical reception ==
"Scream"
A 32-second sample of the chorus of "Scream".

Nathan Rabin of The A.V. Club described the song, along with "Bombay" and "Fantasy", as an attempt to maintain modern appeal, writing that they "capture hip-hop icons desperately trying to pin down the quicksilver sound of today before it becomes yesterday's style." Ann Powers of the Los Angeles Times was dismissive of Timbaland's vocals through the album, writing that "he's ... creepy coming on to Pussycat Doll Nicole Scherzinger." Daniel Incognito of Sputnikmusic praised Keri Hilson's vocals on "Scream" and "Miscommunication", writing that "she displays an intoxicating mix of talented R&B vocals with intelligence, personality and poise." Steve "Flash" Juon of RapReviews described Hilson and Scherzinger's performances as the "dirtiest and most erotic ... of all time". Norman Mayers of Prefix Magazine labeled "Scream" and "Miscommunication", which also features Hilson, as "winners", while commenting that Hilson naturally fits in with Timbaland's songs.

Ivan Rott of About.com, however, expressed his discontent, implying that the song itself would compel one to scream. Andrea Park of The Online Gargoyle shared the same thoughts in her review of the album, stating that "The flat quality of this album was most apparent in the five songs with accompanying female vocalists." Houston Chronicle writer Zharmer Hardimon finds that Keri Hilson's vocals bests those of Nicole Scherzinger while David Hyland of WESH Orlando feels she overdoes the singing, writing that she's "operating under the mistaken impression that her weak voice is some powerful instrument that is bursting forth." A writer for Toronto Star praised "Scream" and "The Way I Are" as some of the album's most interesting tracks.

== Chart performance ==
"Scream" was a moderate hit in many international territories. In Canada, the song first entered the Canadian Hot 100 on the issue dated January 12, 2008, at number ninety-two, during the week that Timbaland's "Apologize" held the top position. It steadily ascended the chart until the issue dated February 16, 2008, when it peaked at number forty-one. "Scream" fared better in Australia, where it peaked on the Australian Singles Chart at number twenty on the week of March 9, 2008, and was present on the chart for a total of fourteen weeks. On the issue dated January 28, 2008, the song debuted on the New Zealand Singles Chart at number thirty-two. It quickly ascended into the top twenty and, by the sixth week, had peaked at number nine. In Ireland, "Scream" debuted on the chart at number fifteen on the issue dated February 7, 2008. The song ascended in the top twenty and on the week ending March 13, 2008, it reached its peak at number ten, rising from number nineteen the week before. In Sweden, the song debuted at number thirty-one on the week ending January 10, 2008. The following week, it moved up twenty places to number eleven and by the fourth week, the song had moved up into the top ten, peaking at number eight. It amassed a total of fifteen weeks on the chart, spending its last week at number sixty.

Across Europe and alongside with Sweden, the song performed moderately and didn't enter in French, Greek and Polish Singles Charts. It reached successfully however the top five in Finland and peaked at number 7 in Iceland, becoming Scherzinger's first top ten in there. It peaked equally at number 9 in Germany, number 15 in Belgium, number 16 in the Netherlands, number 17 in Norway and number 18 in Austria.

== Music video ==
The music video for the song premiered on Yahoo! Music on January 15, 2008, and was directed by Justin Francis. The video begins with Timbaland singing while being massaged and seduced by two women. It then shows cuts of Timbaland, Scherzinger and Hilson singing with and without Balaclavas under a car park. At the conclusion of the second chorus, Scherzinger is shown singing in an elevator while performing in front of a 1965 Buick Riviera and a Ford Mustang with and without a balaclava. The next scene displays Timbaland and his two friends planning a robbery with intercuts of Scherzinger, Hilson and Timbaland singing in front of a car. The video concludes with Timbaland and his two friends walking into the targeted house.

== Track listings ==
Digital download

1. "Scream" (radio edit)

CD single

1. "Scream" (radio edit) – 3:44
2. "Scream" (instrumental) – 5:42

iTunes EP

1. "Scream" (radio edit) – 3:44
2. "Scream" (acapella) – 5:33
3. "Scream" (instrumental) – 5:36

== Credits and personnel ==
Credits adapted from the liner notes of Shock Value, Mosley Music Group, in association with Blackground Records and Interscope Records.

Recording and mixing

- Recorded at Hit Factory Criteria in Miami
- Mixing at Chalice Recording Studios in Los Angeles

Personnel

- Songwriting – Tim Mosley, Nate Hills, Keri Hilson
- Production – Timbaland, Danja
- Recording, mixing and programming – Marcella "Ms. Lago" Araica, Demacio "Demo" Castellon
- Mixing (assistant) – James Barton
- Pro Tools – Ron Taylor
- Drums – Timbaland
- Keyboard and bass – Timbaland, Danja
- Guitar – Kevin Rudolf, Dan Warner, Danja

== Charts ==
=== Weekly charts ===
Chart (2008)	Peak position
Australia (ARIA)	20
Australian Urban (ARIA)	6
Austria (Ö3 Austria Top 40)	18
Belgium (Ultratop 50 Flanders)	15
Belgium (Ultratop 50 Wallonia)	35
Canada Hot 100 (Billboard)	41
CIS Airplay (TopHit)	81
Czech Republic Airplay (ČNS IFPI)	32
Denmark (Tracklisten)	30
Europe (Eurochart Hot 100)	18
Finland (Suomen virallinen lista)	5
Germany (GfK)	9
Hungary (Rádiós Top 40)	33
Hungary (Dance Top 40)	21
Iceland (Tónlistinn)	7
Ireland (IRMA)	10
Latvia (Latvian Airplay Top 50)	11
Netherlands (Dutch Top 40)	13
Netherlands (Single Top 100)	16
New Zealand (Recorded Music NZ)	9
Norway (VG-lista)	17
Romania (Romanian Top 100)	7
Russia Airplay (TopHit)	92
Scotland Singles (OCC)	11
Slovakia Airplay (ČNS IFPI)	5
Sweden (Sverigetopplistan)	8
Turkey (Billboard)	5
UK Singles (OCC)	12
UK Hip Hop/R&B (OCC)	1
US Bubbling Under Hot 100 (Billboard)	22

=== Year-end charts ===
Chart (2008)	Position
Germany (Media Control GfK)	75
Netherlands (Dutch Top 40)	99
Sweden (Sverigetopplistan)	84
UK Singles (OCC)	98
UK Urban (Music Week)	16

== Certifications ==
Region	Certification	Certified units/sales
United Kingdom (BPI)	Silver	200,000^{‡}
^{‡} Sales+streaming figures based on certification alone.

== Release history ==
Region	Date	Format	Label(s)
United States	December 11, 2007	Mainstream radio	Mosley Music Group; Blackground; Interscope
Worldwide	February 15, 2008	Digital download	Blackground; Interscope
Australia	February 23, 2008	Single download	Blackground; Interscope
Belgium	February 23, 2008	Single download	Blackground; Interscope
New Zealand	February 23, 2008	Single download	Blackground; Interscope
United Kingdom	February 23, 2008	Single download	Blackground; Interscope
Worldwide	March 7, 2008	Extended play	Blackground; Interscope
Worldwide	March 7, 2008	Single download	Blackground; Interscope
