= Let It Rock (Kevin Rudolf song) =

2008 single by Kevin Rudolf

Single by Kevin Rudolf featuring Lil Wayne

from the album In the City
- Released: July 29, 2008
- Recorded: 2008
- Genre: Electropop; pop rock; rap rock
- Length: 3:56
- Label: Cash Money; Universal Republic
- Songwriters: Kevin Rudolf; Dwayne Carter
- Producer: Kevin Rudolf

Kevin Rudolf singles chronology
"Let It Rock" (2008)	"Welcome to the World" (2009)

Lil Wayne singles chronology
"Can't Believe It" (2008)	"Let It Rock" (2008)	"Shawty Say" (2008)

Alternative cover
- Digital cover

Music video
- "Let It Rock" on YouTube

"Let It Rock" is the debut single by American singer Kevin Rudolf featuring hip-hop rapper Lil Wayne. It was produced by Rudolf for his debut album, In the City.

In the U.S. and Canada, the song reached #5 on the Billboard Hot 100, number #6 on the Pop 100 and #2 on the Canadian Hot 100. The first week, the song debuted at #45 on the Australian Singles Chart and eventually reached #3. In the United Kingdom, the song climbed to #40 on physical release but due to an increase in airplay, due to BBC Radio 1 adding it to their A-list, the song climbed 30 places to #10 in the song's second week on the chart; then it also reached to #5 the following week. "Let It Rock" received positive reviews from music critics, and was placed at #28 on Rolling Stone's list of the 100 Best Songs of 2008.

The song serves as the official theme music for WWE's 2009 Royal Rumble event. "Let It Rock" was featured in tourism ads for Atlantic City, New Jersey, in 2013. It is also featured on the soundtrack for the 2010 EA Sports football video game Madden NFL 11, and the 2009 romantic comedy film I Love You, Beth Cooper.

"Let It Rock" was certified triple platinum by the RIAA on May 4, 2009. As of July 2011, the song has sold 4,000,000 digital downloads, making it Lil Wayne's third 4-million-seller.

== Meaning ==
"Let It Rock"
"Let It Rock" was the first single from In the City (2008).

Rudolf explained what "Let It Rock" is about, saying: "'Let It Rock' was written from a place of anger and dissatisfaction with the world. It's a song about hypocrisy. It contains biblical references - and yet people still think it's a party song. Whatever works." Rudolf said about "Let It Rock": "It's a song about the hypocrisy in the world, and I'm saying that when I come through, I'm bringing the truth," Rudolf stated. Rudolf then said: "I use the Parable of the Prodigal Son, because I want to expose all the fakes out there — in the music industry, in the world, anywhere. A lot of people think it's a party record, but it's not."

== Track listing ==
Digital download

1. "Let It Rock" (featuring Lil Wayne) - 3:56

U.S. digital CD single

1. "Let It Rock" (clean) (featuring Lil Wayne) - 3:56
2. "Let It Rock" (explicit) (featuring Lil Wayne) - 3:56
3. "Let It Rock" (instrumental) - 3:50
4. "Let It Rock" (explicit a cappella) (featuring Lil Wayne) - 3:50

UK digital CD single

1. "Let It Rock" (album version) (featuring Lil Wayne) - 3:56
2. "Let It Rock" (Filthy Dukes remix) (featuring Lil Wayne) - 6:35
3. "Let It Rock" (Cahill remix) (featuring Lil Wayne) - 6:11
4. "Let It Rock" (radio edit) (featuring Lil Wayne) - 3:54
5. "Let It Rock" (solo version) - 2:48

== Music video ==
The music video for "Let It Rock" features Kevin Rudolf and Lil Wayne performing in front of both a crowd and a dark-hued background, sometimes lit with various effects such as strobe and laserlights. The video premiered in October 1, 2008 on Nickelodeon's 24-hour, teen-aimed, spin-off channel The N (currently TeenNick).

== Samples ==
The song's chorus is also featured in the Iyaz song "Damn They Hot", which features Rudolf himself. The song is also sampled and incorporated into Natasha Bedingfield's song "All I Need" from the 2010 studio album Strip Me, which also features Rudolf.

== Charts ==
=== Weekly charts ===
Chart (2008–2009)	Peak position
Australia (ARIA)	3
Austria (Ö3 Austria Top 40)	23
Belgium (Ultratip Bubbling Under Flanders)	2
Belgium (Ultratip Bubbling Under Wallonia)	23
Canada Hot 100 (Billboard)	2
Germany (GfK)	10
Ireland (IRMA)	4
Netherlands (Dutch Top 40)	10
Netherlands (Single Top 100)	16
New Zealand (Recorded Music NZ)	15
Switzerland (Schweizer Hitparade)	56
Turkey Top 20 Chart	11
UK Singles (Official Charts)	5
US Billboard Hot 100	5
US Adult Pop Airplay (Billboard)	15
US Pop Airplay (Billboard)	6
US Rhythmic Airplay (Billboard)	22

=== Year-end charts ===
Chart (2008)	Position
Australia (ARIA)	90
Canada (Canadian Hot 100)	57
US Billboard Hot 100	65

Chart (2009)	Position
Australia (ARIA)	44
Canada (Canadian Hot 100)	26
Germany (Official German Charts)	67
Netherlands (Dutch Top 40)	51
UK Singles (Official Charts Company)	75
US Billboard Hot 100	32
US Adult Top 40 (Billboard)	45
US Mainstream Top 40 (Billboard)	30

== Certifications ==
Region	Certification	Certified units/sales
Australia (ARIA)	Platinum	70,000^{^}
Germany (BVMI)	Gold	150,000^{‡}
New Zealand (RMNZ)	Platinum	30,000^{‡}
United Kingdom (BPI)	Gold	400,000^{‡}
United States (RIAA)	4× Platinum	4,000,000^{*}
^{*} Sales figures based on certification alone.^{^} Shipments figures based on certification alone.^{‡} Sales+streaming figures based on certification alone.

== Release history ==
Release dates and formats for "Let It Rock"
Region	Date	Format	Label(s)	Ref.
United States	August 11, 2008	Mainstream airplay	Universal Republic	
