= Binocular (album) =

Studio album by Binocular
- Released: May 22, 2001
- Genre: Rock; pop; neo-psychedelia
- Length: 50:55
- Label: Maverick
- Producer: Kevin Rudolf

Binocular chronology
Binocular (2001)	In the City (2008)

Singles from Binocular
- 1. "Deep" Released: 2001

Binocular is the debut studio album by American singer-songwriter Kevin Rudolf under the pseudonym Binocular. It was released on May 22, 2001.

== Background ==
In the early 2000s, Rudolf began work on the group of songs that, nine months later, would form the basis for his major label debut. Written, produced and engineered by Rudolf himself, and mixed by Mark Saunders, the album took nine months to complete. Rudolf was signed to Madonna's record label, Maverick, which released the album under the pseudonym, Binocular.

A song from the album, "You", was used in the TV show Smallville (2001), and a song not appearing on the album, "Maybe You're Gone" (written by Danny Scherr), was later used over the end credits of the movie The Girl Next Door (2004).

== Track listing ==
All tracks are written by Kevin Rudolf.

No.	Title	Length
1.	"You"	4:50
2.	"Never"	4:03
3.	"Everything Turns"	4:12
4.	"Deep"	4:26
5.	"You Were the One"	3:59
6.	"Gone Away"	3:35
7.	"Don't Say Goodbye, Say Goodnight"	4:50
8.	"Fire Burns Bright"	4:25
9.	"Let Me Fly So Long"	4:04
10.	"Wait Until"	4:03
11.	"As the End of the World"	3:05
12.	"Paradise Dub"	5:23
Total length:		50:55

== Reception ==
Despite receiving positive reviews, the album went largely unnoticed in the United States. The singles "Deep" and "Don't Say Goodbye, Say Goodnight" however, saw success in the Philippines.

== Release history ==
Region	Date	Format(s)	Label
United States	22 May 2001	CD	Maverick
