= Kevin Rudolf =

American singer (born 1983)

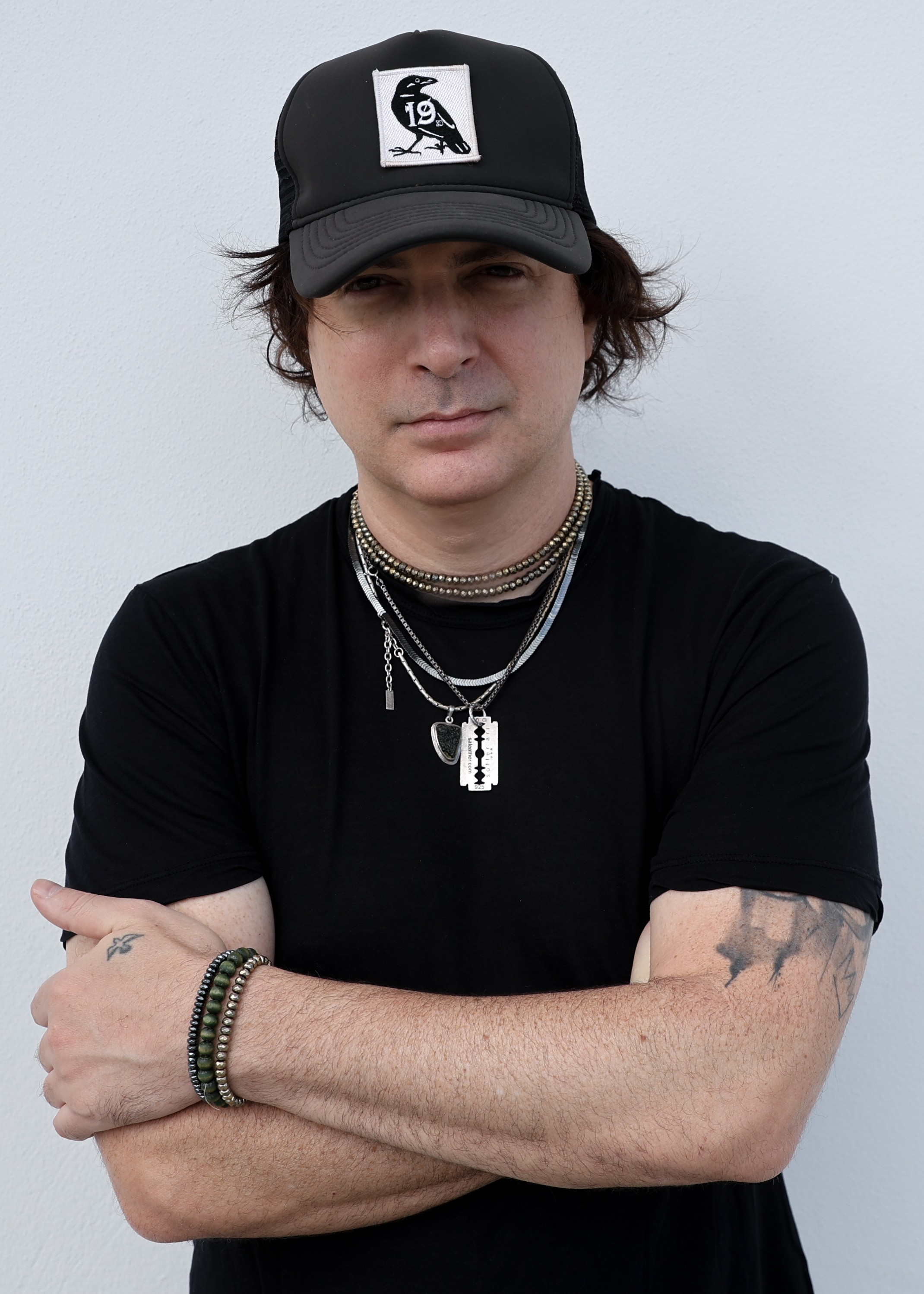
- Rudolf in 2025

Background information
- Also known as: Binocular; Space Rock
- Born: Kevin Winston Rudolf; February 17, 1983 (age 43); New York City, U.S.
- Genres: Rock; hip-hop; pop
- Occupations: Singer; songwriter; musician; record producer
- Instruments: Vocals; guitar; keyboards; synthesizer; bass guitar; drums; ukulele
- Works: Kevin Rudolf discography
- Years active: 1996–present
- Labels: Primary Wave; Cash Money; Island; Universal; Maverick
- Website: kevinrudolf.com

Kevin Winston Rudolf (born February 17, 1983) is an American singer, songwriter, and record producer. He is best known for his 2008 debut single "Let It Rock" (featuring Lil Wayne), which peaked at number five on the Billboard Hot 100 and received quadruple platinum certification by the Recording Industry Association of America (RIAA). He signed with Birdman's Cash Money Records, an imprint of Universal Republic Records to release the song along with the parent album of which it preceded, In the City (2008). The album received mixed reviews and underperformed commercially at number 94 on the Billboard 200, along with his third album To the Sky (2010), which peaked at number 78. Prior, he released his then-eponymous debut album (2001)—under the name Binocular—through Madonna's record label Maverick.

As a producer for other artists, Rudolf has amassed production credits on albums for fellow pop or alternative rock acts including Lifehouse, Cobra Starship, Hollywood Undead, Jesse McCartney, Big Time Rush, Selena Gomez & the Scene, Keith Urban, Gavin DeGraw, and My Darkest Days, among others.

== Early life ==
Kevin Winston Rudolf was born on February 17, 1983, in New York City to Ellyn, an American singer, and Stephen; both his parents are of British descent. He grew up an only child on the Upper East Side, his parents divorcing while he was still very young.

Rudolf has said that his first musical memory is of listening to the song "Jump" by Van Halen, while jumping around the apartment in which he grew up. His skills on the instrument improved rapidly. "My mother actually said something really smart to me. She said, 'Whatever you put in, you'll get out,' so I thought, that makes sense...I started practicing a lot."

Rudolf played with several local bands, including an alternative rock group known as Paint, but soon found himself frustrated with the tensions and internal squabbles associated with a band situation. Taking matters into his own hands, Rudolf began creating his own beats and musical tracks, as well as writing the material.

== Musical career ==
=== 2000–2006: Career beginnings ===
In 2000, Rudolf began work on the group of songs that, nine months later, would form the basis for his major label debut Binocular. Written, produced and engineered by Rudolf, and mixed by Mark Saunders, the album took nine months to complete. Rudolf was signed to Madonna's record label, Maverick, which released the album under the pseudonym, Binocular. A song from the album, "You", was used in the TV show Smallville in 2001, and a song not appearing on the album, "Maybe You're Gone" (written by Danny Scherr), was later used over the end credits of the movie The Girl Next Door in 2004. Despite receiving positive reviews, the album went largely unnoticed in the United States.

Rudolf's solo career took a detour in 2003, when recording engineer Jimmy Douglass introduced him to producer Timbaland. Rudolf was invited to watch a recording session, but, at Timbaland's urging, soon found himself participating, by playing guitar on Lil' Kim's 2003 hit "The Jump Off." Rudolf remembers, "At first I just went into the studio to absorb what I could. I brought my guitar as sort of peace offering so I wasn't feeling completely useless. Soon I was playing parts on songs." Rudolf has stated that his time spent with Timbaland influenced his own attitude in making records. "Working with Timbaland, I was amazed by his work ethic and just how much he would work on something until he got the results he wanted." He would go on to collaborate with Timbaland on many songs, including those by The Black Eyed Peas, Justin Timberlake, Nelly Furtado, and David Banner.

=== 2007–2009: Major label success ===
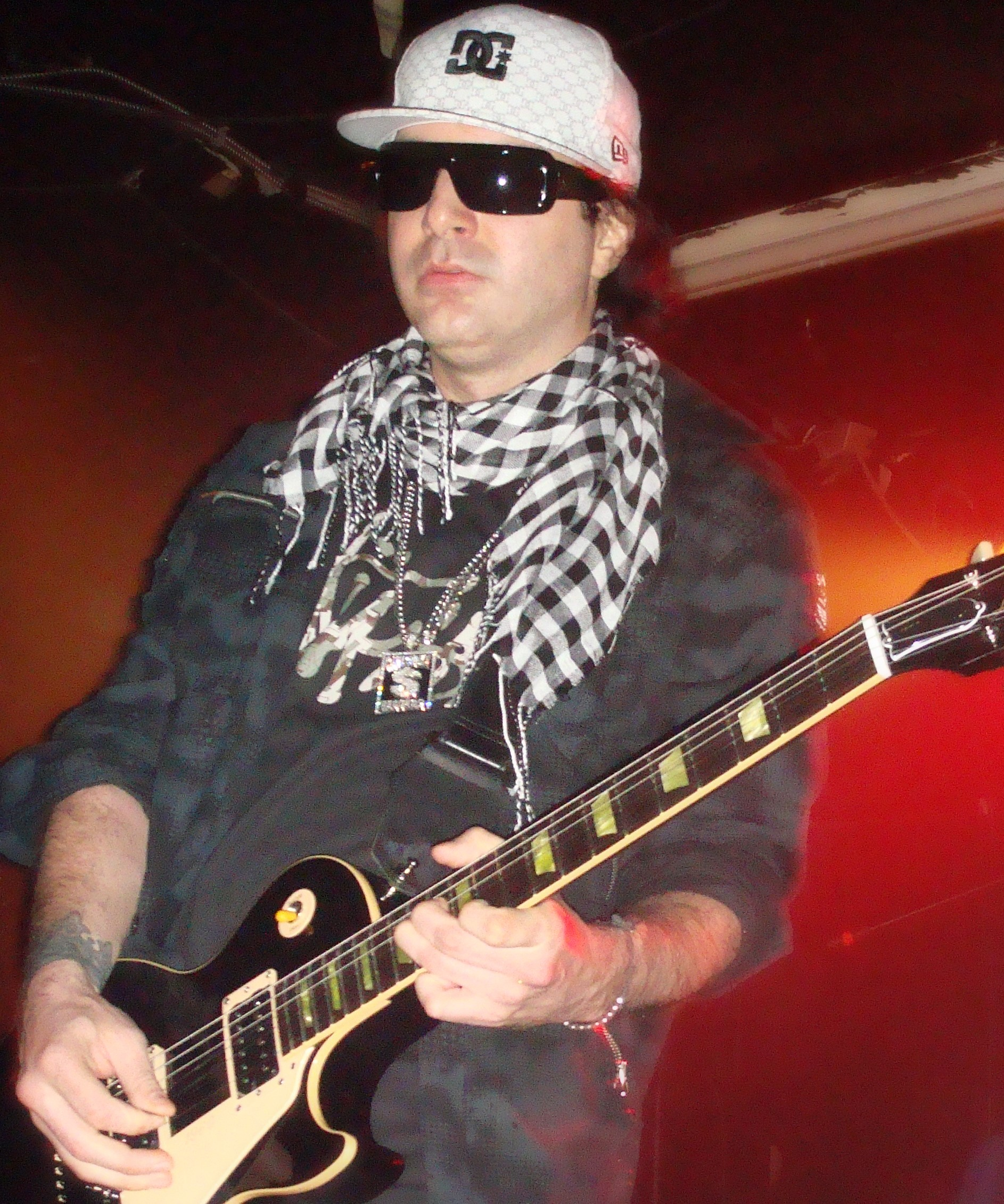
Rudolf in 2009

Rudolf continued to work on his solo material throughout 2007, while still working with Timbaland. During one memorable session, he met Bryan "Birdman" Williams and Ronald "Slim" Williams, brothers and co-CEOs of Cash Money Records. "I played them a couple of records I produced and wrote and they liked them for one of their artists. Then I played them my solo stuff and they flipped out over this song called 'Coffee and Donuts'. We built from there, and a few months later Lil Wayne got on "Let It Rock" and they signed me, and the rest is history."

CEO Slim Williams explained, "we love one-of-a-kind artists, and Kevin rolls that way in everything he does...we are always looking at the next step, the next level we can take our audience. I knew his work with other artists, but when he played me his solo stuff, we just knew we had to partner up."

"Let It Rock", the initial single from Rudolf's then-upcoming album, In the City, was released on June 16, 2008. Written and produced by Rudolf, and featuring Lil Wayne, the song met with immediate success, debuting at number 5 on Billboard magazine's influential Hot 100 chart. Noted music critic David Jeffries predicted that fans would find the song "a near-perfect highlight," while critic Rick Florino called Rudolf's voice "sexy and bombastic" and noted his "diverse set of pipes." The song became a staple of sporting events, listed by BMI as the second most-played song in NFL, MLB and NHL arenas and stadiums.

With "Let It Rock" already a massive hit, fans and media still noted a sense of "mystery" surrounding Rudolf. "There really was no mystery," he said. "The song just blew up faster than we could catch up with it. But it was great that the music was given a chance to speak for itself. People truly felt it--it wasn't anything fake. And with me, music always comes first. Unlike some artists, I don't want the attention to be put on myself as much as my music."

Rudolf's first studio album released under his own name, titled In the City, was released on November 24, 2008, and was produced and co-written by Rudolf, with the exception of one song, "She Can Get It", which was co-produced by the Neptunes. Rudolf explained that the album was about "growing up in New York City when the city was wild... it felt like there were no rules and you could be anyone you wanted. That is the landscape of this album." The album was noted for Rudolf's distinctive merging of musical styles, namely, rock and hip-hop. "It's about taking rock attitude vocally, hip hop drums, synths, and guitars and sharpening the edges of everything in a sense. You bring it together. That's how I do it."

Rudolf's penchant for "genre-bending" was noted in many reviews of the album. "'In the City' cribs tricks from both rap and rock 'n' roll, not in the pursuit of a bastardised Limp Bizkit-type hybrid, but with the intention to produce a crossover rock record with modern hip-hop tools...it's hard to deny Rudolf is a man with some big ideas."

With lead single "Let It Rock" still garnering the most attention, other songs from the album also began to have impact. "Welcome to the World (Kevin Rudolf song)", the album's second single featuring Kid Cudi, went gold and was featured prominently in advertisements for WrestleMania XXVI. His song "N.Y.C." featuring Nas was heard on an episode of CSI: NY.

Throughout most of 2009, Rudolf performed songs from In the City live, including appearances on The Jimmy Kimmel Show, Dancing with the Stars, the Miss USA 2009 pageant and the 2009 NBA All-Star Game.

=== 2010–2014: To the Sky ===
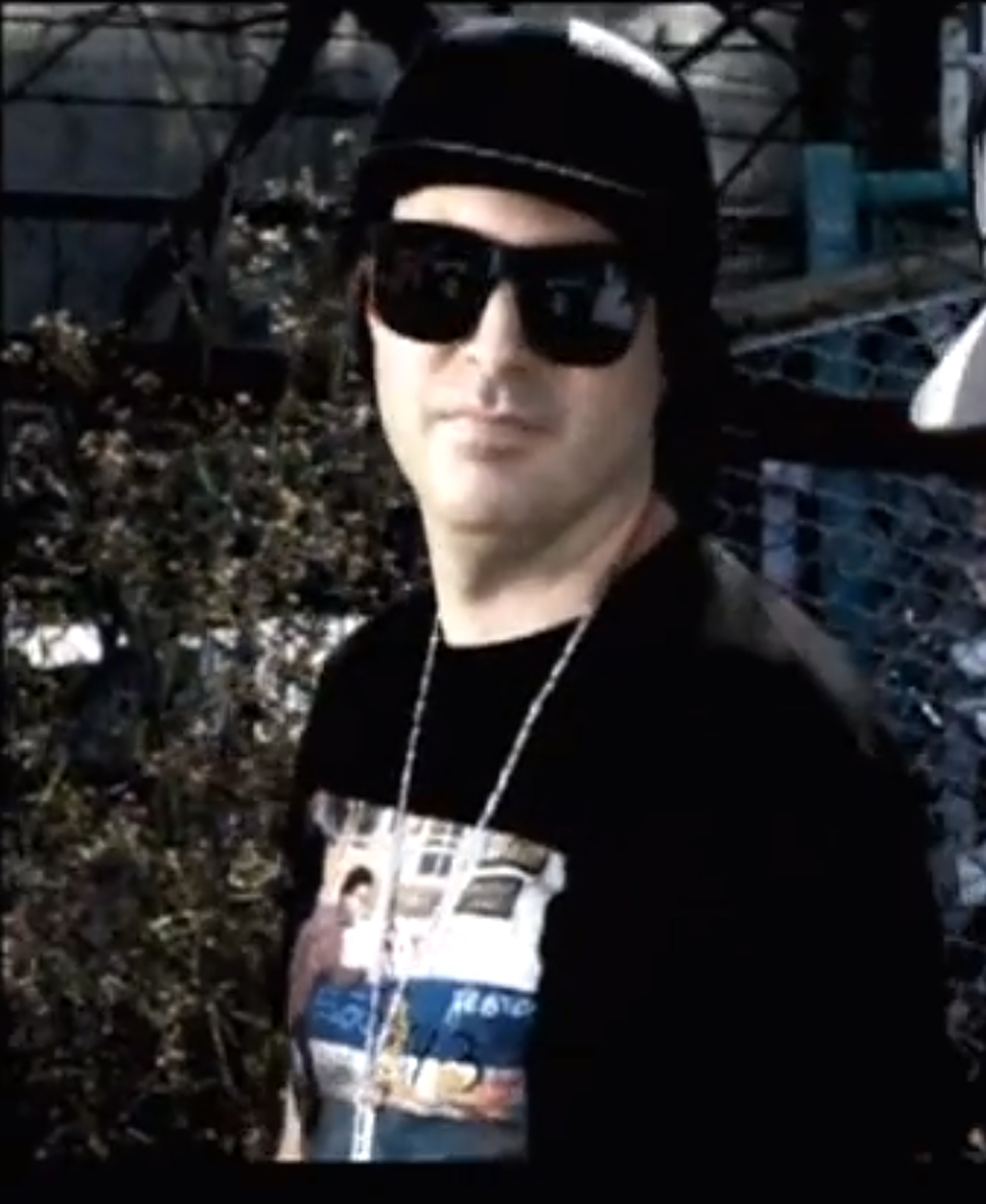
Rudolf in 2010

On June 15, 2010, Rudolf's studio album, To the Sky, was released. The album consists of 11 tracks with a total running time of 37 minutes. The first single from the album, "I Made It (Cash Money Heroes)" featuring Birdman, Jay Sean and Lil Wayne, was released on February 2, 2010, in advance of the album, becoming Rudolf's second platinum single. It was followed, on September 14, by the single "You Make the Rain Fall" featuring Flo Rida. Critical reviews were mixed, with one saying, "this is In the City evolved...to a higher level, while others noted the "good songwriting," but lamented that "without a worthy "Let It Rock" successor, this is hard to recommend over his debut."

Responding to a question about his song, "I Made It (Cash Money Heroes)", Rudolf elaborated on his own feelings regarding success. "I think that 'making it' is something that you do in stages. There's a certain feeling of 'I made it' when you have a hit on the radio for the first time and people are feeling it and buying it and reacting to it at shows. But I've also set new goals since then."

On July 2, 2013, Perez Hilton premiered Rudolf's video for his upcoming single, "Here's to Us." Hilton stated, "'Here's to Us' will be the lead single off his upcoming third album. We seriously got goosebumps watching this video! It has such a positive message. We just LOVE Kevin's outlook on life!" On July 26, Rudolf announced via his official Twitter page that the single, "Here's to Us" would be available on iTunes as of Tuesday, July 30. The song was also featured on the soundtrack of the video game 2014 FIFA World Cup Brazil.

=== 2015–present: Space Rock ===
On January 13, 2015, Kevin Rudolf announced that he had completed his contract with Cash Money Records and now he was an independent artist. After being released from his record deal with Cash Money Records in January 2015, Rudolf could no longer release music under his own name for a period of three years, therefore Rudolf created a new project under the alias Space Rock.

After signing with Primary Wave Music in July 2015, Kevin dropped the name Space Rock and went back to Kevin Rudolf using Space Rock as the album title instead. On May 21, 2015, Kevin released the first single from Space Rock, titled "That Other Ship". The single was re-released on June 22 under Kevin Rudolf as the artist.

On June 22, 2015, Rudolf released a song called "Blaze Of Glory", featured on the WWE Tough Enough soundtrack. On July 7, 2017, he released the single "Nobody Gets Out Alive". On May 19, 2023 Rudolf released a single titled "That's the Way It's Supposed to Be".

=== Production work ===
In September 2009, having finished two solo albums, Rudolf moved from Miami to Los Angeles to concentrate on co-writing and producing records for several LA-based artists, including Amanda Kay (now Ava Max), Cobra Starship, Leona Lewis, Lifehouse, Natasha Bedingfield, Selena Gomez and Weezer. "I spent a lot of time in L.A. after a couple of my records blew up, and I got into producing and writing for a lot of other artists out there. I got into that whole game. Then when I got back to New York—I grew up in New York—I felt completely inspired all over again. I felt like I had done enough of writing songs for other people, that I wanted to really say something. I think what music's lacking right now is there's really no message. No one's saying anything...I just felt like I really wanted to put something back in the world that inspires people, says something, and means something."

In 2013, Rudolf took a break from recording his own album to co-write a song with country artist Keith Urban and country songwriters Brad and Brett Warren called "Little Bit of Everything", which Urban debuted on May 16, 2013, on the season 12 finale of American Idol.

== Personal life ==
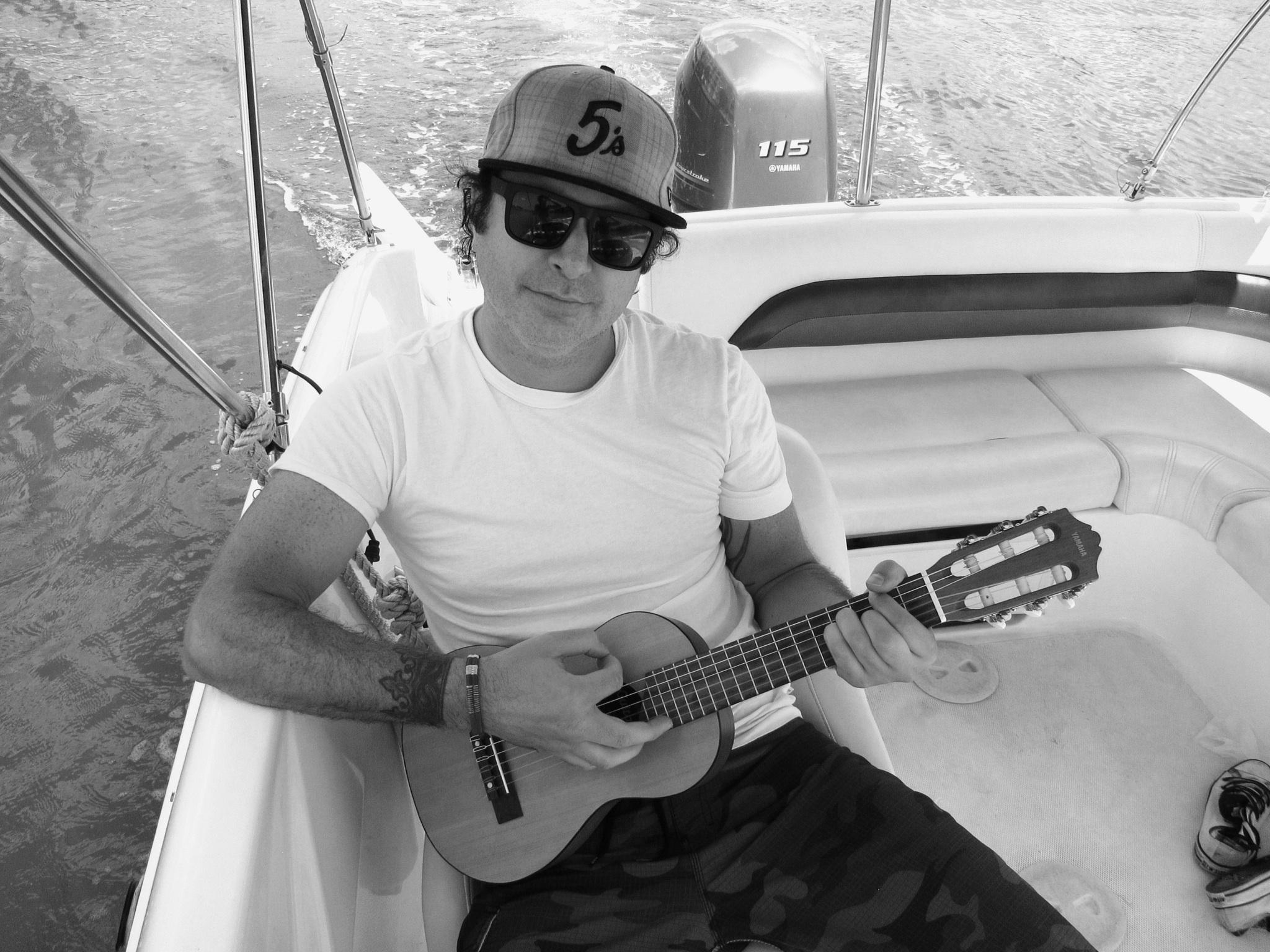
Kevin Rudolf in Miami 2013

Having grown up in New York City, the only child of divorced parents, Rudolf has stated that he has found greater inspiration and a stronger sense of belonging in his adopted city of Miami. Rudolf first lived temporarily in Miami while doing session work with producer Timbaland. After relocating to Los Angeles in 2010 while writing and producing for several artists, Rudolf returned to New York for a brief time in 2012 to begin work on his upcoming album, then moved permanently to Miami.

== Discography ==
Studio albums

- Binocular (2001)
- In the City (2008)
- To the Sky (2010)
- Against the Wall (Vol. 1) (2024)
