= 2010 in Canadian music =

The following is a list of notable events and releases that occurred in 2010 Canadian music.

== Events ==
=== January ===
- 1 January – Folk singer Lhasa de Sela dies in Montreal of breast cancer.
- 19 January – Folk singer Kate McGarrigle dies in Montreal.

=== April ===
- 18 April
  - Devon Clifford, drummer for the indie rock band You Say Party! We Say Die! dies of complications from a brain hemorrhage he suffered two nights previous while performing onstage in Vancouver.
  - The 2010 Juno Awards

=== June ===
- 17 June
  - The 2010 Polaris Music Prize 40-album longlist is announced.
  - The Broken Social Scene concert film This Movie Is Broken, directed by Bruce McDonald, premieres as part of Toronto's NXNE festival.
- 29 June – Rapper/singer Drake is sued by Playboy Enterprises over the use of the 1974 song "Fallin' In Love" by Hamilton, Joe Frank & Reynolds in Drake's 2009 hit "Best I Ever Had." Playboy, which owns the rights to "Fallin' In Love," claims Drake used the song's sample without permission and is seeking to claim any profits made from the Drake single.

=== July ===
- 6 July – The Polaris Music Prize 10-album shortlist is announced.

=== September ===
- 20 September – Karkwa's album Les Chemins de verre wins the 2010 Polaris Music Prize.

== Albums released ==
=== A ===
- The Acorn, No Ghost
- aKido, Gamechanger
- Annihilator, Annihilator
- Apollo Ghosts, Mount Benson
- Arcade Fire, The Suburbs

=== B ===
- Baby Eagle, Dog Weather
- Matthew Barber, True Believer
- Barenaked Ladies, All in Good Time
- The Beauties, The Beauties
- Bedouin Soundclash, Light the Horizon
- Ridley Bent, Rabbit on My Wheel
- The Besnard Lakes, The Besnard Lakes Are the Roaring Night
- Justin Bieber, My World 2.0
- The Birthday Massacre, Pins and Needles
- Black Mountain, Wilderness Heart
- Blackburn Brothers, Brotherhood
- Born Ruffians, Say It
- Bran Van 3000, The Garden
- Brasstronaut, Mt. Chimaera
- Broken Social Scene, Forgiveness Rock Record
- Jim Bryson and The Weakerthans, The Falcon Lake Incident
- Buck 65, 20 Odd Years
- Basia Bulat, Heart of My Own
- Matthew Byrne, Ballads

=== C ===
- Kathryn Calder, Are You My Mother?
- Paul Cargnello, La Course des loups
- Caribou, Swim
- Chic Gamine, City City
- Chromeo, Business Casual
- Ora Cogan, The Boggy Mire
- Ora Cogan, The Quarry
- Jason Collett, Rat a Tat Tat
- Ève Cournoyer, Tempête
- Crash Karma, Crash Karma
- Crystal Castles, Crystal Castles

=== D ===
- Tanya Davis, Clocks and Hearts Keep Going
- Delerium, Remixed: The Definitive Collection
- Shawn Desman, Fresh
- Diamond Rings, Special Affections
- Dirty Circus, Alive and Well
- Fefe Dobson, Joy
- Luke Doucet, Steel City Trawler
- Gordon Downie, The Grand Bounce
- Drake, Thank Me Later
- D-Sisive, Vaudeville
- Marc Dupré, Entre deux mondes

=== E ===
- Fred Eaglesmith, Cha Cha Cha
- Elephant Stone, The Glass Box
- Elise Estrada, Here Kitty Kittee

=== F ===
- Frazey Ford, Obadiah
- Forest City Lovers, Carriage
- Frog Eyes, Paul's Tomb: A Triumph

=== G ===
- Hannah Georgas, This Is Good
- Ghostkeeper, Ghostkeeper
- Gigi, Maintenant
- The Golden Dogs, Coat of Arms
- Gonzales, Ivory Tower
- Jenn Grant, Songs for Siigoun
- Grey Kingdom, The Grey Kingdom
- Emm Gryner, Gem and I
- Jim Guthrie, Now, More Than Ever (Extended Edition)

=== H ===
- Sarah Harmer, Oh Little Fire
- Holy Fuck, Latin
- Hot Hot Heat, Future Breeds
- Hot Panda, How Come I'm Dead?
- Huron, Huron

=== I ===
- Chin Injeti, D'tach

=== J ===
- Japandroids, No Singles
- Lyndon John X, Brighter Days

=== K ===
- Kalle Mattson, Anchors
- Karkwa, Les Chemins de verre
- Kyrie Kristmanson, Origin of Stars

=== L ===
- Land of Talk, Cloak and Cipher
- Richard Laviolette and the Oil Spills, All of Your Raw Materials
- Library Voices, Denim on Denim

=== M ===
- Ryan MacGrath, Cooper Hatch Paris
- Mares of Thrace, The Moulting
- Emma McKenna, Run With It
- Sarah McLachlan, Laws of Illusion
- Greg MacPherson, Mr. Invitation
- Kate Maki, Two Song Wedding
- Martha and the Muffins, Delicate
- Michou, Cardona
- Millimetrik, Mystique Drums (LP), Afterglow (EP)
- Ruth Minnikin, Depend on This
- Ariane Moffatt, Trauma: Chansons de la série télé
- The Mohawk Lodge, Crimes
- Ruth Moody, The Garden
- The Most Serene Republic, Fantasick Impossibliss
- The Mountains and the Trees, I Made This for You

=== N ===
- The New Pornographers, Together
- No Kids, Judy at the Grove

=== O ===
- Oktoécho, La 5e Route Bleue
- Old Man Luedecke, My Hands Are on Fire and Other Love Songs
- Olenka and the Autumn Lovers, And Now We Sing
- Jenny Omnichord, All Our Little Bones

=== P ===
- The Pack A.D., We Kill Computers
- Steven Page, Page One
- Owen Pallett, Heartland
- Philémon Cimon, Les Sessions cubaines
- Pigeon Hole, Age Like Astronauts
- Dany Placard, Placard
- Plants and Animals, La La Land
- Po' Girl, Follow Your Bliss
- Postdata, Postdata
- Ghislain Poirier, Running High
- The Provincial Archive, Maybe We Could Be Holy

=== R ===
- Radio Radio, Belmundo Regal
- Rah Rah, Breaking Hearts
- Raised by Swans, No Ghostless Place
- Johnny Reid, A Place Called Love
- Rise Ashen and Ammoye, Haffi Win
- Daniel Romano, Workin' for the Music Man
- The Russian Futurists, The Weight's on the Wheels
- Justin Rutledge, The Early Widows

=== S ===
- The Sadies, Darker Circles
- The Salteens, Grey Eyes
- Samian, Face à la musique
- John K. Samson, Provincial Road 222
- Ivana Santilli, Santilli
- Sea Oleena, Sea Oleena
- Secret and Whisper, Teenage Fantasy
- Shad, TSOL
- Shapes and Sizes, Candle to Your Eyes
- The Sheepdogs, Learn & Burn
- Siskiyou, Siskiyou
- Small Sins, Pot Calls Kettle Black
- Snailhouse, Monumental Moments
- John Southworth, Human Cry
- Jay Sparrow, In Our Time
- Rae Spoon, Love Is a Hunter
- Frederick Squire, March 12 – 2 November
- Kinnie Starr, A Different Day
- Stars, The Five Ghosts
- Sum 41, Screamer
- Suuns, Zeroes QC
- Swollen Members, Greatest Hits: Ten Years of Turmoil

=== T ===
- Maylee Todd, Choose Your Own Adventure
- Tokyo Police Club, Champ
- Trillionaire$, By Hook or by Crook

=== V ===
- Diyet van Lieshout, The Breaking Point
- Leif Vollebekk, Inland

=== W ===
- Rufus Wainwright, All Days Are Nights: Songs for Lulu
- The Weakerthans, Live at the Burton Cummings Theatre
- The Wheat Pool, Behind the Stars
- Winter Gloves, All Red
- Wintersleep, New Inheritors
- Wolf Parade, Expo 86
- Women, Public Strain
- Royal Wood, The Waiting
- Woodhands, Remorsecapade
- Woodpigeon, Die Stadt Muzikanten
- Woodpigeon, Balladeer: To All the Guys I've Loved Before
- Donovan Woods, The Widowmaker
- Wool on Wolves, Grey Matter
- Hawksley Workman, Meat
- Hawksley Workman, Milk

=== Y ===
- Nikki Yanofsky, Nikki
- You Say Party, REMIXXXX
- Neil Young, Le Noise
- Yukon Blonde, Yukon Blonde

=== Z ===
- Zeus, Say Us

== Top hits on record ==
=== Top 10 albums ===
These albums consist of Canadian sales only.

Rank	Artist	Album	Peak position	Sales	Certification
1	Justin Bieber	My World 2.0	1	213,000	3× Platinum
2	Arcade Fire	The Suburbs	1	160,000	2× Platinum
3	Johnny Reid	A Place Called Love	1	160,000	2× Platinum
4	k.d. lang	Recollection	3	160,000	2× Platinum
5	Drake	Thank Me Later	1	120,500	Platinum
6	Celine Dion	La Tournee Mondiale Taking Chances: Le Spectacle	1	100,000	Diamond
7	Bobby Bazini	Better in Time	4	80,000	Platinum
8	deadmau5	4×4=12	7	80,000	Platinum
9	Justin Bieber	My Worlds Acoustic	5	80,000	Platinum
10	Nikki Yanofsky	Nikki	5	80,000	Platinum

=== Top 10 American albums ===
These albums are Canadian sales only.

Rank	Artist	Album	Peak position	Sales	Certification
1	Eminem	Recovery	1	435,000	Platinum
2	Bruno Mars	Doo-Wops & Hooligans	1	240,000	3× Platinum
3	Katy Perry	Teenage Dream	1	320,000	4× Platinum
4	Lady Antebellum	Need You Now	1	240,000	3× Platinum
5	Taylor Swift	Speak Now	1	240,000	3× Platinum
6	Kesha	Animal	1	160,000	2× Platinum
7	Pink	Greatest Hits... So Far!!!	4	160,000	2× Platinum
8	Josh Groban	Illuminations	4	83,100	Platinum
9	Glee	Glee: The Music, The Christmas Album	1	81,000	TBA
10	Avenged Sevenfold	Nightmare	2	80,000	Platinum

=== Top British albums ===
Rank	Artist	Album	Peak position	Sales	Certification
1	Susan Boyle	The Gift	1	160,000	2× Platinum
2	Slash	Slash	1	80,000	Platinum
3	Elton John and Leon Russell	The Union	7	40,000	Gold
4	Gorillaz	Plastic Beach	3	40,000	Gold
5	Iron Maiden	The Final Frontier	1	40,000	Gold
6	Ozzy Osbourne	Scream	4	40,000	Gold
7	Phil Collins	Going Back	3	40,000	Gold
8	Phil Collins	Going Back – Live At Roseland Ballroom, NYC	TBA	5,000	Gold
9	Porcupine Tree	Anesthetize	TBA	5,000	Gold

=== Top International albums ===
Rank	Artist	Album	Peak position	Sales	Certification
1	Rihanna	Loud	1	163,500	3× Platinum (1× in 2010)
2	Enrique Iglesias	Euphoria	12	40,000	Gold
3	Volbeat	Beyond Hell/Above Heaven	TBA	40,000	Gold
4	Santana	Guitar Heaven: The Greatest Guitar Classics of All Time	3	8,500	TBA

=== Top 10 Singles ===
Rank	Artist	Song	Album	Peak position	Sales	Certification
1	Adele	"Rolling in the Deep"	21	1	720,000	9× Platinum
2	Bruno Mars	"Grenade"	Doo-Wops & Hooligans	1	480,000	6× Platinum
3	Bruno Mars	"Just the Way You Are"	Doo-Wops & Hooligans	1	480,000	6× Platinum
4	Katy Perry	"Firework"	Teenage Dream	1	480,000	6× Platinum
5	Foster the People	"Pumped Up Kicks"	Torches	3	400,000	5× Platinum
6	Nikki Yanofsky	"I Believe"	Nikki	1	400,000	5× Platinum
7	Taio Cruz	"Dynamite"	Rokstarr	1	400,000	5× Platinum
8	Cee Lo Green	"Fuck You"	The Lady Killer	7	320,000	4× Platinum
9	Katy Perry	"Teenage Dream"	Teenage Dream	1	320,000	4× Platinum
10	Katy Perry featuring Snoop Dogg	"California Gurls"	Teenage Dream	1	320,000	4× Platinum

=== Canadian Hot 100 Year-End List ===
No.	Artist(s)	Title
1	Katy Perry featuring Snoop Dogg	"California Gurls"
2	Kesha	"Tik Tok"
3	Lady Gaga	"Bad Romance"
4	Taio Cruz	"Dynamite"
5	Taio Cruz featuring Ludacris	"Break Your Heart"
6	Train	"Hey, Soul Sister"
7	Eminem featuring Rihanna	"Love the Way You Lie"
8	B.o.B featuring Hayley Williams	"Airplanes"
9	Lady Antebellum	"Need You Now"
10	The Black Eyed Peas	"I Gotta Feeling"
11	Adam Lambert	"Whataya Want from Me"
12	Jason Derulo	"In My Head"
13	Usher featuring will.i.am	"OMG"
14	Lady Gaga	"Alejandro"
15	Lady Gaga featuring Beyoncé	"Telephone"
16	Katy Perry	"Teenage Dream"
17	Enrique Iglesias featuring Pitbull	"I Like It"
18	Hedley	"Perfect"
19	Young Artists for Haiti	"Wavin' Flag"
20	Usher featuring Pitbull	"DJ Got Us Fallin' in Love"
21	K'naan	"Wavin' Flag"
22	Flo Rida featuring David Guetta	"Club Can't Handle Me"
23	Kesha	"Your Love Is My Drug"
24	Jay-Z and Alicia Keys	"Empire State of Mind"
25	Bruno Mars	"Just the Way You Are"
26	Owl City	"Fireflies"
27	Eminem	"Not Afraid"
28	David Guetta featuring Akon	"Sexy Bitch"
29	Timbaland featuring Katy Perry	"If We Ever Meet Again"
30	Rihanna	"Only Girl (In the World)"
31	Michael Bublé	"Haven't Met You Yet"
32	Iyaz	"Replay"
33	Nikki Yanofsky	"I Believe"
34	Adam Lambert	"If I Had You"
35	Far East Movement featuring The Cataracs and Dev	"Like a G6"
36	Mike Posner	"Cooler than Me"
37	Down with Webster	"Your Man"
38	Rihanna	"Rude Boy"
39	The Black Eyed Peas	"Meet Me Halfway"
40	Timbaland featuring Justin Timberlake	"Carry Out"
41	Nelly	"Just a Dream"
42	Drake	"Find Your Love"
43	Kesha featuring 3OH!3	"Blah Blah Blah"
44	Jason Derulo	"Whatcha Say"
45	Travie McCoy featuring Bruno Mars	"Billionaire"
46	B.o.B featuring Bruno Mars	"Nothin' on You"
47	Fefe Dobson	"Ghost"
48	Kesha	"Take It Off"
49	Timbaland featuring Nelly Furtado and SoShy	"Morning After Dark"
50	Kardinal Offishall featuring Akon	"Body Bounce"
51	Taylor Swift	"Mine"
52	Jay Sean featuring Sean Paul and Lil Jon	"Do You Remember"
53	The Black Eyed Peas	"Imma Be"
54	Hedley	"Don't Talk to Strangers"
55	Edward Maya and Vika Jigulina	"Stereo Love"
56	K'naan	"Take a Minute"
57	Jason Derulo	"Ridin' Solo"
58	Nickelback	"This Afternoon"
59	Shakira featuring Freshlyground	"Waka Waka (This Time for Africa)"
60	Longo & Wainwright featuring Craig Smart	"One Life Stand"
61	Justin Bieber featuring Ludacris	"Baby"
62	The Script	"Breakeven"
63	Young Money featuring Lloyd	"BedRock"
64	Marianas Trench	"Beside You"
65	Britney Spears	"3"
66	OneRepublic	"All the Right Moves"
67	Boys Like Girls featuring Taylor Swift	"Two Is Better Than One"
68	David Guetta featuring Kid Cudi	"Memories"
69	Marianas Trench	"Celebrity Status"
70	Maroon 5	"Misery"
71	Jay-Z and Mr Hudson	"Young Forever"
72	Rihanna featuring Young Jeezy	"Hard"
73	Pink	"Raise Your Glass"
74	3OH!3 featuring Kesha	"My First Kiss"
75	Miley Cyrus	"Party in the U.S.A."
76	Sean Kingston and Justin Bieber	"Eenie Meenie"
77	CeeLo Green	"Fuck You"
78	Shawn Desman	"Shiver"
79	Cascada	"Evacuate the Dancefloor"
80	Stereos	"Turn It Up"
81	David Guetta and Chris Willis featuring Fergie and LMFAO	"Gettin' Over You"
82	B.o.B featuring Rivers Cuomo	"Magic"
83	Taylor Swift	"You Belong with Me"
84	Faber Drive	"Give Him Up"
85	Down with Webster	"Whoa Is Me"
86	Shawn Desman	"Night Like This"
87	Justin Bieber featuring Usher	"Somebody to Love"
88	Kelly Clarkson	"Already Gone"
89	Selena Gomez & the Scene	"Naturally"
90	Orianthi	"According to You"
91	Drake	"Over"
92	Miley Cyrus	"Can't Be Tamed"
93	Hedley	"Cha-Ching"
94	Tiësto featuring Tegan and Sara	"Feel It in My Bones"
95	Pearl Jam	"Just Breathe"
96	Hedley	"Hands Up"
97	Yolanda Be Cool and DCUP	"We No Speak Americano"
98	Adam Lambert	"For Your Entertainment"
99	Daughtry	"Life After You"
100	Pitbull featuring Akon	"Shut It Down"

== Deaths ==
- 1 January – Lhasa de Sela, folk singer-songwriter
- 18 January – Kate McGarrigle, folk singer-songwriter
- 21 January – Paul Quarrington, novelist (Whale Music) and musician
- 9 February – Jacques Hétu, composer
- 15 March – Dan Achen, former guitarist for Junkhouse
- 18 April – Devon Clifford, drummer for You Say Party! We Say Die!
- 22 April – Gene Lees, music critic and songwriter
- 16 June – Maureen Forrester, opera singer
- 27 July – Edward Gamblin, country rock singer-songwriter

== See also ==
- 2010s in music
- 2010 in Canadian television

Preceded by 2009 in Canadian music	Canadian music 2010	Succeeded by 2011 in Canadian music
