= Annie Villeneuve =

French-Canadian pop singer-songwriter (born 1983)

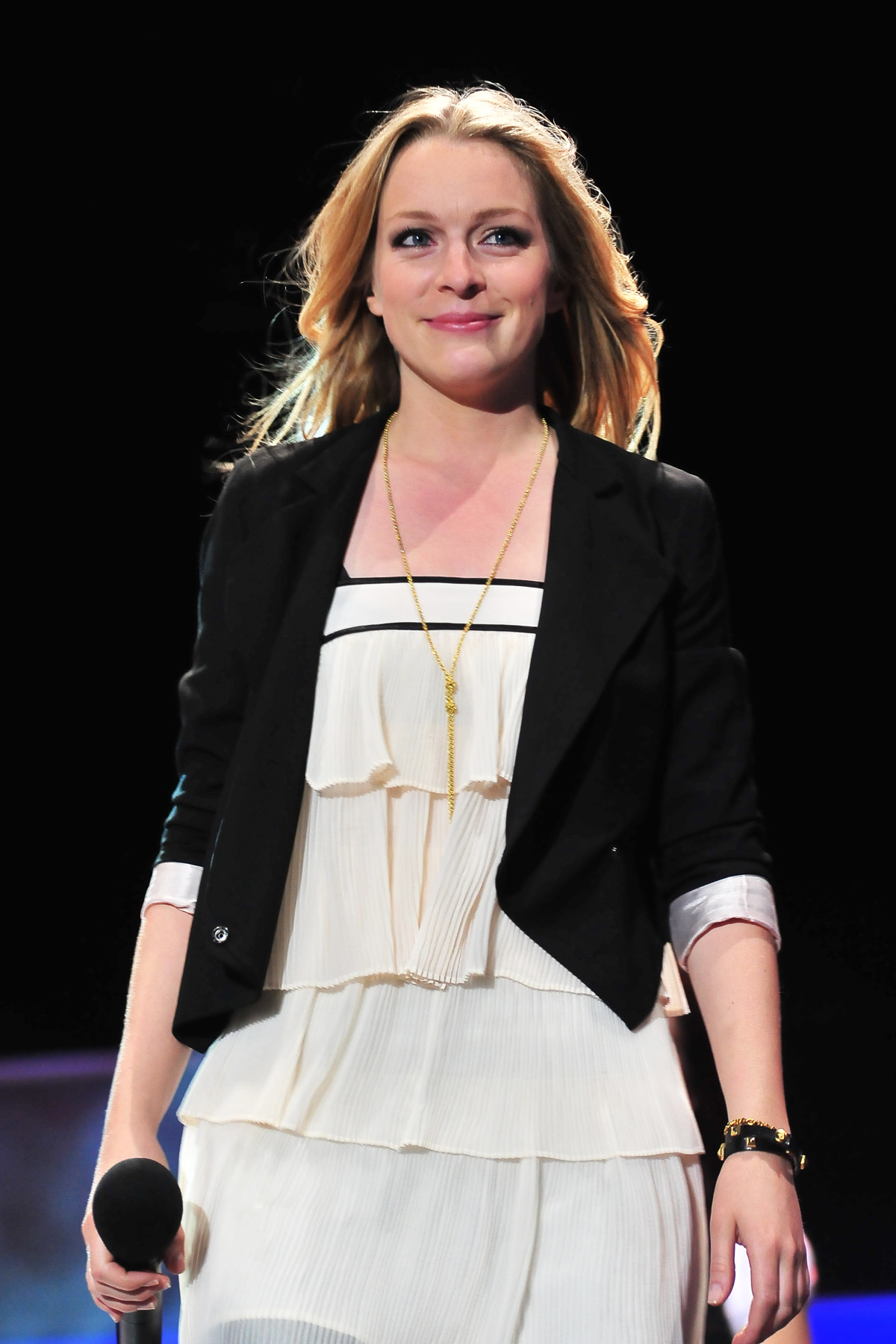

Background information
- Born: May 5, 1983 (age 42); Jonquière, Quebec, Canada
- Genres: Pop
- Occupations: Singer-songwriter, musician
- Instruments: Vocals, piano
- Years active: 2003 – present
- Website: annievilleneuve.com

Annie Villeneuve (born May 5, 1983) is a French-Canadian pop singer-songwriter. She participated at the first season of Star Académie in 2003. She also sang the French and the bilingual official song of the 2010 Vancouver Olympics, I Believe/J'imagine.

== Biography ==
Annie Villeneuve was born on May 5, 1983, in Jonquière, Quebec, Canada. She has a twin sister, Suzie Villeneuve, who also had a singing career until 2010. Villeneuve grew up around music and participated in her church choir. Later, she joined the choir La chorale des jeunes Saguenéens. In 2000, Villeneuve joined the musical group Québecissime from the Saguenay region. She has covered many popular songs by Canadian singers such as Celine Dion.

In 2003, Villeneuve participated in the first season of Star Académie, a reality television show similar to American Idol or Canadian Idol. She was one of three female finalists. Villeneuve did not win; however, the experience brought her exposure and popularity among the Quebec public. She released her first album "Quand je ferme les yeux" in 2005. This album has sold more than 120,000 albums (a high number in Quebec) and was certified Platinum. Her songs "Un ange qui passe" and "Tomber à l'eau" remained number one on the BDS Billboard for many weeks.

That same year, Villeneuve was nominated for three Adisq awards. She starred in the television show Annie Villeneuve Acoustic. In the summer of 2007, Villeneuve co-hosted the artistic news TV show Flash.

Villeneuve has worked with several famous artists such as Serge Lama and Garou. In 2005, Villeneuve was asked by Céline Dion to be a back-up singer at her show on Les Plaines d'Abraham for the ceremonies of the 400th anniversary of Quebec City.

In 2009, Villeneuve released her second album, Annie Villeneuve. Her song "Ce soir" topped the BDS Billboard charts and her singles "Mon Héros" and "Rien de mieux à faire" were also successful. This same year, Villeneuve met Guillaume Latendresse, a French Canadian hockey player who played for the Montreal Canadiens and who now plays for the Ottawa Senators. They have been together since. In the winter of 2010, Villeneuve worked with Stephan Moccio to record both a French and a bilingual version of the 2010 Vancouver Olympics theme song. On the day of the closing ceremonies, she performed the bilingual version of "I Believe/J'Imagine" with Nikki Yanofsky, accompanied by Stephan Moccio on piano. She is now considering performing and promoting herself in France.

In the autumn of 2012, Annie released her third album, Telle qu'elle. She says that she is really proud of these songs, since she wrote and composed almost every one. Her songs discuss many serious and personal subjects. Le sais-tu? was one of the most popular songs in Quebec radios at the time.

== Talents ==
Villeneuve plays the piano, and during her shows she accompanies the song "Quand je ferme les yeux". As a speaker and presenter she took part in the reality show Star Académie in 2003. Later, in 2006, she co-hosted the television variety show Demandes spéciales with Marc-André Fortin and Audrey Gagnon. She and Patrick Marsolais also co-hosted the news program Flash.

== Social involvement ==
Annie supports a number of social causes. She is the spokesperson of the Leucan foundation, a Quebec organization that supports children with cancer or leukemia. She has also been a spokesperson for the annual radio campaign, Le club des petits déjeuners du Québec. Annie participates in numerous charity telethons like Opération Enfant Soleil, a foundation that supports the development of pediatric care in Quebec.

== Discography ==
=== Albums ===
Year	Album details	Peak	Certifications (sales threshold)
Year	Album details	CA	Certifications (sales threshold)
2005	Quand je ferme les yeux: Released: 2005; Format: CD	—	CAN: Platinum
2009	Annie Villeneuve: Released: 2009; Format: CD, digital download	—	CAN: Gold
2010	Noël chez moi: Released: November 9, 2010; Format: CD, digital download	7	CAN: Gold
2012	Telle qu'elle: Released: September 25, 2012; Format: CD, digital download	–	CAN: –
2017	5 (Cinq): Released: April 10, 2017; Format: CD, digital download	22	CAN: –
"—" denotes releases that did not chart

== Filmography ==
- 2003: La tournée Star Académie (DVD) (trans: Star Académie on tour)
- 2007: Annie Villeneuve Acoustique (DVD) (trans: Annie Villeneuve Acoustic)

== Songs ==
2003

- Et c'est pas fini (with the 13 other stars of Star Académie) (translation: It's Not Over)
- Je vais changer le monde (with Jean-François Bastien) (trans: I'm Going to Change the World)
- Quand tout ça sera fini (trans: Once It's All Over)

2004

- Le sucre et le sel (with Suzie Villeneuve and Garou on his album) (trans: The Sugar and the Salt)

2005

- Un ange qui passe (trans: An Angel Who Passes By)
- Quand je ferme les yeux (trans: When I Close my Eyes)
- Tomber à l'eau (trans: Falling in the Water)
- Un homme (trans: A Man)
- S'il fallait (with Suzie Villeneuve) (trans: If It Were Needed)
- La moitié de moi (trans: The Other Half of Me)
- Je penserai à toi (trans: I'll Think of You)
- Toi et moi (trans: You and Me)
- En silence (trans: In Silence)
- Juste un instant (trans: Just a Moment)

2006

- Une année en un jour (with Marc-André Fortin on his album) (trans: A Whole Year in a Day)

2007

- All I Want For Christmas Is You (with Dany Bédar) (single)

2009

- Ce soir (trans: Tonight)
- Ton plus grand secret (trans: Your Deepest Secret)
- Rêve encore (trans: Dream Again)
- Rien de mieux à faire (trans: Nothing Better to Do)
- C'est une autre histoire (trans: That's Another Story)
- Les mains vides (trans: Empty Hands)
- Comment te dire (trans: How Do I Tell You)
- Le désamour (trans: Out of Love)
- Plus rien (trans: Nothing More)
- Elle veut parler (trans: She Wants to Talk)
- Que feras-tu de nous (trans: What Will You Make of Us)
- Mon héros (trans: My Hero)

2009

- Entre l'ombre et la lumière (with Boom Desjardins on his album) (trans: Between the Darkness and the Light)

2010

- J'imagine (French version) (trans: I Believe by Nikki Yanofsky)
- J'imagine/I believe (Bilingual version)

2010

- Joyeux Noël (The Christmas Song)
- Marie-Noël (Mary-Christmas)
- Le sentier de neige (The Snow Path)
- Sainte nuit (Silent Night)
- Ave Maria
- Amazing Grace
- Minuit, chrétiens (O, Holy Night)
- Quand les hommes vivront d'amour (When Mankind Will Live with Love)
- Le Père Noël a pris un coup (Santa Claus Had a Few [Drinks])
- 23 décembre (December 23)
- Noël chez nous (Christmas at Home)
- Happy Xmas

2012

- Le sais-tu (Do You Know It)
- Plus jamais (Never Again)
- Celui de ma vie (The One of my Life)
- Chanson pour mon grand-père (Song for my Grandfather)
- Bien plus grande (Way Much Bigger)
- Tu dors (You're Sleeping)
- Je t'emporte avec moi (I Bring You With Me)
- Rien n'a changé (Nothing Has Changed)
- Les années passent (Years Go By)
- Ta letter (Your Letter)
- Aime-moi pour un jour (Love me for a Day)
- La vérité (The Truth)

2017

- C'est ça la vie (This Is Life)
- Femme Canon (Hot Woman)
- Emmène-moi (Bring me)
- Le chemin (The Way)
- L'insomnie (Insomnia)
- Plus fort que nous (Stronger Than Us)
- Une fois de plus (One More Time)
- Lève les yeux (Open Your Eyes)
- Le présent (The Present)
- I Want To Know What Love Is
- Un rêve à la fois (One Dream At A Time)
