= Unlove You =

Unlove You may refer to:

- "Unlove You" (Ashley Tisdale song), 2007
- "Unlove You" (Elise Estrada song), 2007
- "Unlove You" (Jennifer Nettles song), 2016
