= Insatiable (Elise Estrada song) =

Single by Elise Estrada

from the album Elise Estrada
- Released: June 2, 2007
- Recorded: Early 2007
- Genre: Pop; Soul; Funk
- Length: 3:48
- Label: RockSTAR Music Corp.
- Songwriter(s): Adam H. Hurstfield; Anthony Anderson; Dane Deviller; Sean Hosein; Steven Smith
- Producer(s): Adam H. Hurstfield; Anthony Anderson; Dane Deviller; Sean Hosein

Elise Estrada singles chronology
"Insatiable" (2007)	"Ix Nay" (2007)

"Insatiable" is a song performed by Canadian singer Elise Estrada. It peaked at number 44 on Canadian Hot 100, and on the Canadian Adult Contemporary Top 40 at number 1 throughout the summer of 2007. It was on radio station CFBT-FM's regular rotation. The song received heavy airplay in Canada, marking the first time a Filipino-Canadian had a number one song in Canada.

"Insatiable" received positive reviews by critics for both the single and the album on which the song appears. It infuses Pop and soul with funk, as well with Electropop and R&B styles. The song samples Prince's "I Wanna Be Your Lover" for its bass line. The music video was directed by Ali Visnaji. The video is about a stalker Estrada encounters and talks to through the song. It depicts Estrada dancing and singing in a plaza in downtown Vancouver, British Columbia. As of 2017, Estrada performed this song during Filipino Day 2007, Summer Rush Wonderland 2007, a concert series in Guilford Town Centre, and Summer Rush Wonderland 2008.

== Background ==
In March 2007, Estrada won a radio contest in her home city of Vancouver that earned her a spot on the record label RockSTAR Music Corporation. The label introduced her to some successful producers and songwriters including Grammy Award winner Orlando Calzada, a mixer who worked on songs for Jennifer Lopez and Destiny's Child. After signing with the label, she recorded her debut album, which was a success, and won the award for Best New Solo Artist in the Canada Radio Music Awards. She also appeared as the opening act during Canadian tours of Rihanna, Soulja Boy, Lady Gaga, the Backstreet Boys and 50 Cent.

== Composition ==
"Insatiable" is a pop-soul funk song with slight elements of Electropop and R&B. It features a hard drum beat, claps, synthesizers, a guitar riff and a heavy bass. The song sample's 1979 Prince song, "I Wanna Be Your Lover" in which notes its similarity in the bass and the melody.

The lyrics describe Elise talking about a boy checking her out to try to acquire his sexual desires with her by just what she wears, act and looks, instead of knowing her to date. She then gives out a strict set of reasons with her "booty beauty" as the only reason that the boy wants to "ride" and that a physical encounter would be only be sensational to the guy rather than his love which would be insatiable.

== Reception and Chart Performance ==
Matthew Chisling from AllMusic reviewed the song as "a spunky pop treat" and to be a creditable song for the debut album with the other singles, "These Three Words" and "Unlove You".

"Insatiable" charted as number one for six consecutive weeks on the main Canada Top 40 and debuted at number 44 (which is the peak position) on the Canadian Billboard Hot 100 a few weeks after the release on July 28 of 2007. During the last week of August, the song dropped to number 59. In the first week of September the song was still on the charts at number 54 after 17 weeks on the charts.

== Music video ==
The video begins with a cruise boat floating around and her Blackberry phone ringing to her song "Ix-Nay" in which Elise answers. However another boy, who seems to be a stalker, heavily breaths into the phone without speaking and takes photos around his room and videos her while near the dock. With realizing that it's the "stalker", she hangs up and calls her friend saying, "Hey, he called again. Are you ready?" The song begins to play as she moves around the outside seat of her boat in a black coat-dress, jewellery and tan heels. The other part of the video is when she dances around a plaza with her backup dancers in downtown Vancouver, in a bikini like shirt and dangling belt with skirt and gold heels. On the boat, she asks two police officers to find the stalker while the stalker checks out the previous photos only to be caught by the police.

The video was set in Vancouver's shore and downtown area. The choreographers were Joanne & Alex Pseusich The director is Ali Visanji, the producers are Ken Firth and Adam H., the development producer is Norm Li and the editor is Piet Suess. The copyright is owned by RockSTAR, Koch Entertainment, VideoFACT and MuchMusic Canada. The video was produced in co-operation with VideoFACT.

== Live performances ==
Through all performances of "Insatiable", she is accompanied by a DJ, normally DJ Marquee, in which she opens the song differently and has the crowd singing with chants and screams. She has performed the song twice in the Summer Rush concert in Canada Wonderland in both 2007 and 2008. She performed the song during Filipino Day 2007 and a concert series in the Guilford Town Centre. All performances are accompanied by her dancers in the back and DJ Marquee as a featured vocalist.

== Credits and personnel ==
- Elise Estrada – vocals, songwriter
- Adam Hurstfield – songwriter, producer
- Anthony Anderson – songwriter, producer
- Dane Deviller – songwriter, producer
- Sean Hosein – songwriter, producer
- Steven Smith – songwriter

Notes taken from AllMusic credits.

== Charts ==
Chart (2007)	Peak position
Canada (Canadian Hot 100)	44
Canada CHR/Top 40 (Billboard)	6
Canada Hot AC (Billboard)	38
