= Turn Down the Sound =

Studio album by Nikki Yanofsky
- Released: July 10, 2020
- Recorded: April 2019
- Studio: Warner-Chappell Studios
- Genres: Funk; R&B; jazz pop; hip-hop
- Length: 36:08
- Label: eOne Music
- Producers: Roger Kleinmen; Zachary Seman

Nikki Yanofsky chronology
Solid Gold EP (2016)	Turn Down the Sound (2020)

Singles from Turn Down the Sound
- 1. "Forget" Released: January 30, 2020

Turn Down the Sound is the fourth studio album by Canadian singer Nikki Yanofsky, released on July 10, 2020. The album's lead single, "Forget" was released on January 30, 2020, with a meme music video to accompany it. The video premiered the same day on Billboard's website. The second single "Nerve" was released on March 20, 2020, after her Together at Home Instagram live concert. The third single "Loner" was released on May 15, 2020.

The album was originally titled Black Sheep, but was changed. In an interview with IHeartRadio Canada, Yanofsky said that Turn Down the Sound was her first choice for the title of the album, but she faced a lot of criticism within her team from choosing the title. She then decided to change it back last minute because it was "true to herself".

The album's title track "Turn Down the Sound" and "Bubbles" were written by Yanofsky with her friend Rod Temperton. "Bubbles" was the last song Temperton ever worked on, as it was his last song loaded on his music production software. Temperton nicknamed Yanofsky "Wobbles", which was why the song was named "Bubbles".

== Recording ==
The album was recorded in two straight weeks with no days off at Warner Chappell Studios in New York City. It was recorded in April 2019 under the producers Roger Kleinmen and Zachary Seman who have worked with ASAP Rocky and Joey Badass before. Yanofsky called the recording a "very special experience" in an Instagram post. She also said that the recording did not feel like work at all, as it was genuinely fun. The first songs recorded were "High Note", and "Throwing Stones". "Throwing Stones" was recorded with musician Remy using a Wurlitzer.

== Promotion ==
Yanofsky originally had two promotional shows that she would perform in Montreal and Toronto before the album's release. However, they have since been moved to the fall because of the COVID-19 pandemic. On July 6, Yanofsky performed her single "Loner" on The Morning Show Canada to support the album.

== Track listing ==
Turn Down the Sound track listing
No.	Title	Length
1.	"Loner"	3:34
2.	"Turn Down the Sound" (Temperton, Yanofsky)	4:20
3.	"Sunshine"	3:15
4.	"Forget"	3:21
5.	"Nerve"	2:36
6.	"High Note"	3:50
7.	"Throwing Stones"	4:30
8.	"Black Sheep"	3:23
9.	"Bubbles" (Temperton, Yanofsky)	3:25
10.	"Owe It All"	3:54
Total length:		36:08

== Chart performance ==
The album performed moderately well during its first week of release. It was the 34th best selling album across all digital platforms according to Exclaim! Magazine.

== Charts ==
Chart (2020)	Peak position
Canada Current Album Sales (Billboard)	33
