= California Gurls =

2010 single by Katy Perry and Snoop Dogg

Single by Katy Perry featuring Snoop Dogg

from the album Teenage Dream
- B-side: "Hot n Cold" (Yelle Remix)
- Released: May 7, 2010
- Studio: Conway Recording (Hollywood, California)
- Genre: Disco-pop; electropop
- Length: 3:56
- Label: Capitol
- Songwriters: Katy Perry; Lukasz Gottwald; Max Martin; Benjamin Levin; Bonnie McKee; Calvin Broadus
- Producers: Dr. Luke; Max Martin; Benny Blanco

Katy Perry singles chronology
"If We Ever Meet Again" (2009)	"California Gurls" (2010)	"Teenage Dream" (2010)

Snoop Dogg singles chronology
"That Tree" (2010)	"California Gurls" (2010)	"It's in the Mornin'" (2010)

Music video
- "California Gurls" on YouTube

"California Gurls" is a song by American singer Katy Perry from her third studio album, Teenage Dream (2010). It was released as the album's lead single on May 7, 2010, through Capitol Records. The song features rap verses from Snoop Dogg. They both co-wrote "California Gurls" with Bonnie McKee and its producers Dr. Luke, Max Martin, and Benny Blanco. The track was recorded at Conway Recording Studios, based in Hollywood, Los Angeles. The song's mid-tempo production contains disco-pop and electropop. Its lyrics are an ode to the state of California, in which both Perry and Snoop Dogg were born and raised. According to Perry, "California Gurls" is an answer song to "Empire State of Mind" by Jay-Z and Alicia Keys.

Originally, "California Gurls" was intended to be sent to mainstream and rhythmic airplay on May 25, 2010. However, it instead debuted on May 7, after the song leaked online. It was subsequently released to iTunes on May 11. Upon its release, music critics praised "California Gurls" for its production and chorus. The song earned a Grammy Award nomination for Best Pop Collaboration with Vocals at the 53rd Annual Grammy Awards. In 2012, Billboard ranked it No. 1 on a special "The 30 Summer Songs of All Time" listing.

"California Gurls" was a commercial success, topping the US Billboard Hot 100 for six consecutive weeks, giving Perry her second No. 1 single in the United States and Snoop Dogg his third. It also topped the record charts in seven other countries, was the best-selling single of 2010 in Canada, and is certified Platinum or higher in nine countries, including 9× Platinum in Australia, and Diamond in Canada and the United States. When "California Gurls" was certified Diamond by the Recording Industry Association of America (RIAA), Perry became the first female artist to have four Diamond-certified singles in the United States, the others being "Firework", "Roar", and "Dark Horse".

The accompanying music video for "California Gurls" was directed by Mathew Cullen, and depicts Perry and her backup dancers as pieces of a board game, set in the fictional "Candyfornia". Perry has said that the inspiration behind the music video was artist Will Cotton, who was also the artistic director for the video. It has also been noted that the music video was influenced by several other works, including Charlie and the Chocolate Factory, Alice's Adventures in Wonderland, and the board game Candyland. The song would be performed on all of Perry's tours since her California Dreams Tour, alongside her concert residency, Play. It was also included in Perry's performance at Pepsi's Super Bowl XLIX halftime show in 2015, at Glendale, Arizona. It has also appeared in numerous pieces of media, including the video game Just Dance 3.

== Background ==
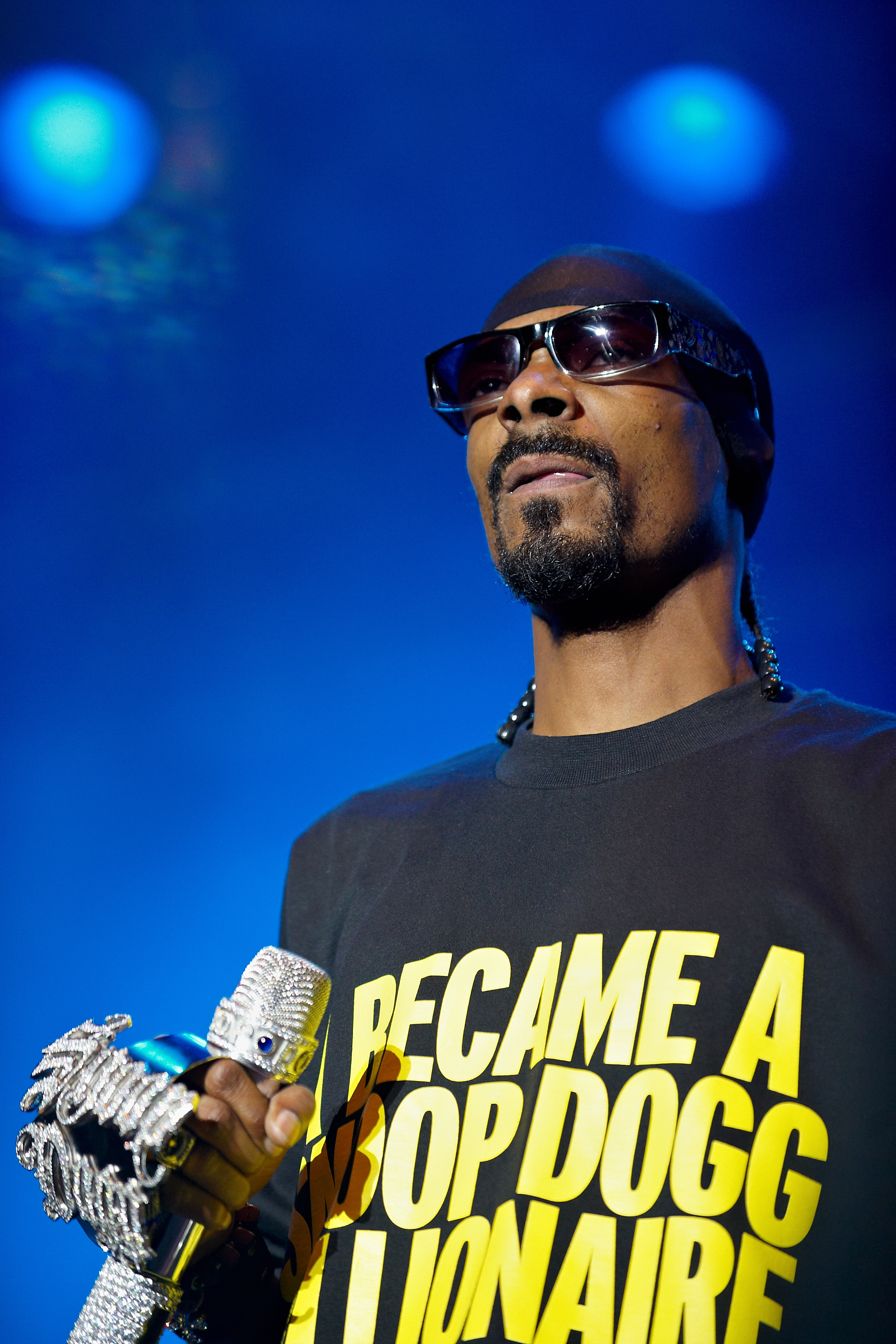
Perry found Snoop Dogg as a rapper with whom to collaborate on "California Gurls" through a search on Wikipedia.

In an interview with HitQuarters, Perry's A&R agent at the time, Chris Anokute, said that while travelling back from an Oscar after-party, Perry texted him to say she did not think the album was finished and that it needed one more song. She said that she wanted to write a song about California girls. During a Rolling Stone photo shoot in April 2010, Perry revealed details about the song, reportedly a response to Jay-Z's "Empire State of Mind", she stated:

"It's so great that 'Empire State of Mind' is huge and that everybody has the New York song, but what the fuck? What about LA? What about California? And it's been a minute since we've had a California song and especially from a girl's perspective. We took the references of Prince, which is always a great reference, and we took a lot of the '90s, ... almost that house music, some of those references."

Perry used Wikipedia to research which rapper she wanted to collaborate with for "California Gurls", browsing West Coast artists before selecting Snoop Dogg. Initially, the song was going to be titled "California Girls". The spelling was changed to "California Gurls" after the death of Big Star member Alex Chilton as a nod to their song, "September Gurls". Rondor Music, the company that owns the publishing rights to the Beach Boys' "California Girls", allegedly threatened a lawsuit due to the lyric "I wish they could all be California Girls", a line that was taken from the Beach Boys' song.

After the song was leaked online, Capitol Records decided to release it early, and it was posted on Perry's official website, and the radio date was moved down from May 25 to 7, 2010.

== Composition ==
"California Gurls" is a disco-pop and electropop track. Musicnotes published this song in the key of F major and the tempo of 126 beats per minute over a house beat. Perry's vocal range in the song spans from the lower note of C_{4} to the higher note of D_{5}. "California Gurls" utilizes multiple synths, drums, funk guitars, and electronic whooshes in its production.

== Critical reception ==
"California Gurls" was given five stars from Nick Levine of Digital Spy who commended Perry's "charismatic" vocals on the song as well as its "unstoppable pop chorus". Leah Greenblatt of Entertainment Weekly and Katie Hasty of HitFix called it "the summer jam" of 2010. Rob Sheffield of Rolling Stone said that the song sets the tone for Teenage Dream. Chris Richards of The Washington Post praised the song, calling it "fresh" and "fierce". He commended the expertise of the song's arrangement and its "buoyant" chorus. Richards went on to say that "California Gurls" is "an ever-lasting gobstopper of a tune" and that "summertime megahits rarely feel this good". Musician Brian Wilson, who had co-written the Beach Boys' "California Girls", commended Perry's vocal on her song and described its melody as "infectious".

Glenn Gamboa of Newsday reviewed the song saying, "'California Gurls' is a fizzy-pop concoction of empty calories, but it sure does stick with you." He went on to note that the craftsmanship of the song was of a high standard. Steve Leftridge of PopMatters called "California Gurls" the radio jam of the summer of 2010 and "the gargantuan singalong fantasy that delivered on the promise built by the disco thump of hits like 'I Kissed a Girl' and 'Hot n Cold'." Leftridge also praised the song's musical composition, lyrical content and chorus which he said "you know by heart halfway through your first listen." The track was deemed as a highlight on Teenage Dream by Stephen Thomas Erlewine of AllMusic. Michael Cragg of musicOMH praised the song, "First single California Gurls is brilliant, brattish fun, Perry sounding sweet and coy on the verses before that huge chorus erupts". Edna Gundersen of USA Today said that the track is "an effervescent toast to summer fun." In a negative review, Greg Kot of Chicago Tribune dismissed the song as "relentlessly mechanical". He went on to describe Perry's vocal performance on the song as "a series of syllables digitally stitched together." The single received a Grammy nomination for Best Pop Collaboration with Vocals. On May 25, 2012, Billboard ranked the song number one on a special The 30 Summer Songs of All Time listing.

== Commercial performance ==
"California Gurls" sold 294,000 digital downloads in its first week and debuted at number one on the US Billboard Digital Songs chart. It debuted at number two on the Billboard Hot 100, making it Perry's highest debut on the chart at the time. On the issue dated June 19, 2010, the song reached number one, becoming Perry's second number-one song and Snoop Dogg's third. "California Gurls" became the first single by an artist signed to Capitol Records in nearly 43 years to ascend to the number-one spot on the Billboard Hot 100 in its fourth week since Bobbie Gentry's single "Ode to Billie Joe" reached the top after four weeks on the chart. It is Perry's third number one on the Pop Songs chart. "California Gurls" became the first song to top the 300,000 mark in digital sales more than once in 2010 with 318,000 and 359,000 copies sold in the first and second week of June, respectively. Within seven weeks of its release, "California Gurls" sold over two million downloads, which is the second fastest pace to do so in digital history behind Flo Rida's "Right Round". It debuted at number 31 on the Billboard Radio Songs chart and in the July 10, 2010, issue it reached number one on the magazine's Hot Dance Airplay chart, giving Perry her second number-one single on that chart. As of June 2023, the song has been certified Diamond by the Recording Industry Association of America (RIAA), making Perry the first female artist to achieve this with 4 singles and 5.9 million copies sold in the US.

On May 24, 2010, "California Gurls" debuted on the Australian Singles Chart at number three, and later reached the number-one spot. On the RIANZ Top 10 Radio Airplay Charts, the song came in at number one in New Zealand and also received Gold certification from Recording Industry Association of New Zealand (RIANZ). "California Gurls" entered the UK Singles Chart on June 27, 2010, at number one, becoming her second chart-topper in the country. The single sold 123,607 copies in the UK in its first week (the second highest number in 2010 after the Helping Haiti charity single "Everybody Hurts"). After two weeks, the song sold 216,000 copies in the UK. On October 29, 2010, the British Phonographic Industry classified the single as a "platinum record" (meaning it has sold over 600,000 units). As of October 2013, the single had sold 780,787 copies in the United Kingdom, becoming Perry's third best-selling single there behind "Firework" and "Roar". Elsewhere, "California Gurls" reached number one in Canada. In Germany, the song rose to number three, staying 37 weeks on the chart. "California Gurls" was certified Platinum in Germany in November 2011 for 300,000 units sold. In France, "California Gurls" debuted within the top twenty in the issue of July 3, 2010 and reached the top five two weeks later, for three non-consecutives weeks, becoming Perry's third top five in the country. The single spent 37 weeks and became the third longuest-running single for the singer after "I Kissed a Girl" (2008) (40 weeks) and "Hot N Cold" (41 weeks). "California Gurls" was the twentieth best-selling single in France in 2010, peaked at number one at the French Airplay, and peaked at number three on French Downloads. It was later certified platinum in there in 2012 for 140,000 units sold, becoming the singer's third best-selling song. "California Gurls" has sold 13 million copies worldwide as of May 2022.

== Music video ==
Perry in the music video, seen as she engages in a battle with Snoop Dogg

The video was directed by Mathew Cullen and was inspired by the work of Will Cotton, who was also the artistic director of the video. Filming of the video began on May 14, 2010. It premiered on June 14, 2010. Perry explained the use of a candy theme instead of a beach theme for the video, saying, "It's definitely something to watch when you have the munchies. ... It's all edible. We named it 'Candyfornia' instead of 'California', so it's a different world," she said. "It's not just like, 'Oh, let's go to the beach and throw a party and then shoot a music video!' It's more like, 'Let's put us California Gurls in a whole different world!" The video has been controversial since there were several accusations of plagiarism against Perry, one due to similarities between the video and "Fergalicious" by Fergie, particularly in the sets and the outfits.

In the music video, Perry is a game piece in Candyfornia, a game based in poker and board games. The settings are inspired in part by Alice's Adventures in Wonderland, Charlie and the Chocolate Factory, and the board game Candy Land, with much of the set decorated with cupcakes, ice creams, cotton candy, and lollipops. Snoop Dogg, who is referenced in the lyrics by his old name Snoop "Doggy" Dogg, appears in the video as a king named "Sugar Daddy" that is holding several young women (Queens of Candyfornia) captive throughout the game, using candy-related devices to hold them. Perry moves around, experimenting with objects. She moves through the land, making discoveries and freeing the women. In the chorus, she appears lying down on a cotton candy cloud, naked. Snoop Dogg tries to block her advances in many ways. When all the women are free, Perry leads them in a dance on the beach. Seeing the women freed, "Sugar Daddy" becomes enraged, marching on the women's position with an army of gummy bears. Perry defeats the army with whipped cream guns attached to her breasts, after which the stunned king throws down his staff and surrenders. The video ends with "Sugar Daddy" buried up to his neck in the sand by the women, nonetheless admiring their beauty and (in a nod to the Beach Boys song) wishing that women everywhere could be California girls. Various California landmarks appear in the video, such as the Hollywood Walk of Fame, the Hollywood Sign, Sunset Boulevard, the Capitol Records Building, the Golden Gate Bridge and Venice Beach which were all made out of confectionery.

In October 2010, four months after the release of the official video, the original video by “KatyPerryMusic,” was replaced with the current version uploaded by “emimusic.” The original upload, which garnered over 56 million views, is no longer available.

== Live performances ==
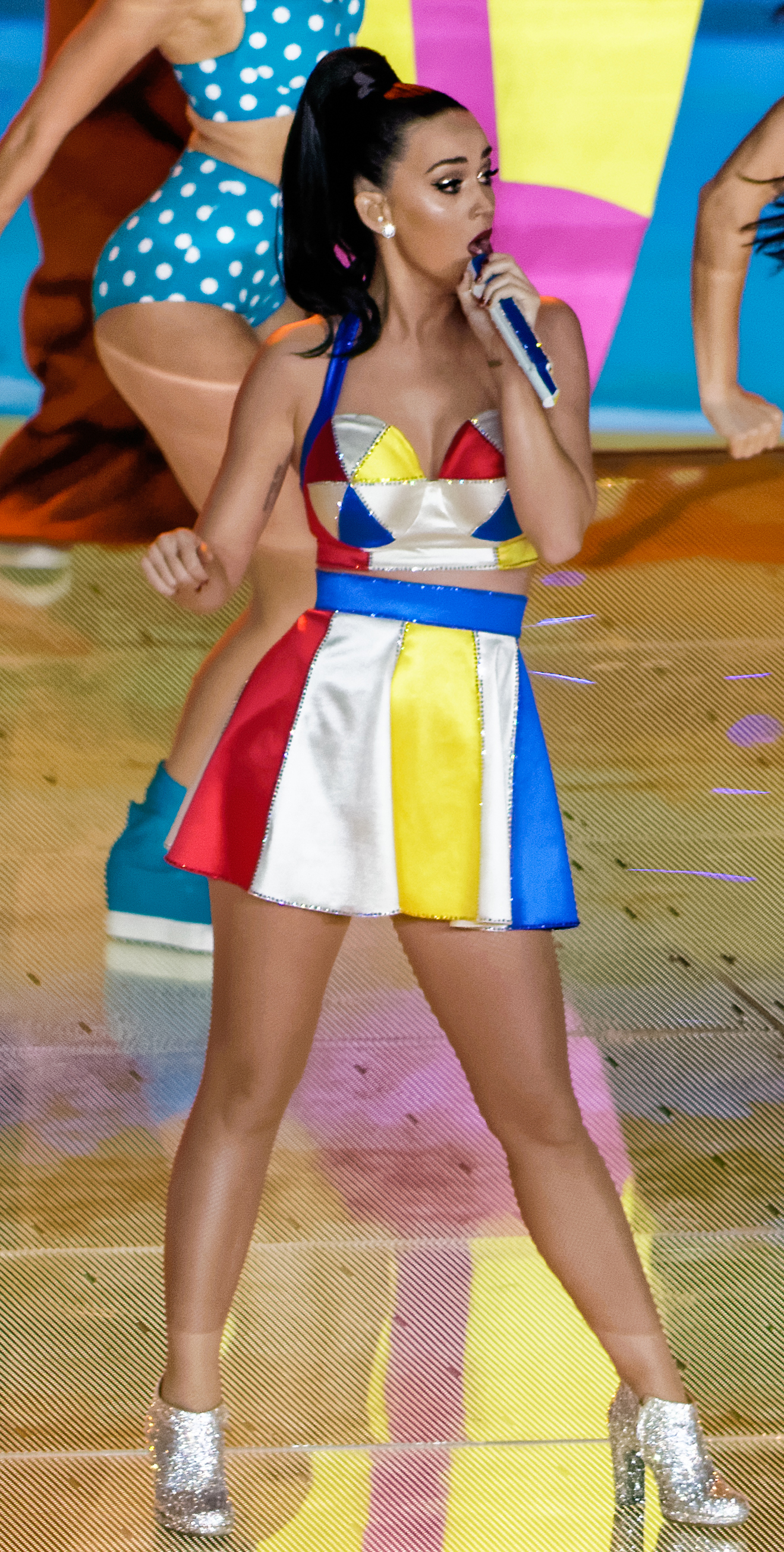
Perry performing the song during the Super Bowl XLIX halftime show in February 2015

Perry performed the song on May 20, 2010, at the CW networks' annual "upfronts" presentation in New York. Perry performed the song at the 2010 MTV Movie Awards on June 6, 2010, alongside Snoop Dogg. She performed the song at the Le Grand Journal in Paris, on June 10, 2010, without Snoop Dogg. Perry also performed the song during her guest appearance on the September 25, 2010, episode of Saturday Night Live. Perry performed the song on The GRAMMY Nominations Concert Live! – Countdown to Music's Biggest Night on December 1, 2010. "California Gurls" was included as the encore for her California Dreams Tour. Perry performed California Gurls without Snoop Dogg on the BBC One chat show The Graham Norton Show on June 28, 2010.

On May 25, 2014, Perry performed the song at BBC Radio 1's Big Weekend in Glasgow. On February 1, 2015, Perry was the headliner of Super Bowl XLIX halftime show and "California Gurls" was part of the performance. On May 27, 2017, Perry performed the song at BBC Radio 1's Big Weekend in Hull. On January 30, 2025, Perry performed the song at Intuit Dome in Inglewood, California, for FireAid to help with relief efforts for the January 2025 Southern California wildfires.

== Covers and media usage ==
The Hub released a promo for the animated series My Little Pony: Friendship Is Magic, titled "Equestria Girls", set to the song's melody, with a new set of lyrics written specifically for the show and performed by Shannon Chan-Kent from the perspective of the character Pinkie Pie.

A video clip of Cebu Pacific flight attendants performing a pre-flight safety demonstration as a dance routine to this song ended up as a viral YouTube video clip, attracting comment. In 2011, Ariana Grande recorded a video of herself remixing the song with Kesha's "Tik Tok".

== Formats and track listings ==
- Digital download
1. "California Gurls" (featuring Snoop Dogg) – 3:56
- CD single
1. "California Gurls" (featuring Snoop Dogg) – 3:56
2. "Hot n Cold" (Yelle Remix) – 4:07
- US digital download – remix EP
1. "California Gurls" (Armand Van Helden Remix) – 5:48
2. "California Gurls" (Innerpartysystem Main Mix) – 4:27
3. "California Gurls" (Manhattan Clique Long Beach Mix) – 7:00
- UK digital download – remix EP
1. "California Gurls" (MSTRKRFT Main Mix) – 3:59
2. "California Gurls" (Innerpartysystem Main Mix) – 4:27
3. "California Gurls" (Manhattan Clique Long Beach Mix) – 7:00

== Charts ==
=== Weekly charts ===
Chart (2010)	Peak position
Australia (ARIA)	1
Austria (Ö3 Austria Top 40)	3
Belgium (Ultratop 50 Flanders)	6
Belgium (Ultratop 50 Wallonia)	3
Bulgaria Airplay (BAMP)	4
Canada Hot 100 (Billboard)	1
Canada CHR/Top 40 (Billboard)	1
Canada Hot AC (Billboard)	1
CIS Airplay (TopHit)	31
Croatia International Airplay (HRT)	1
Czech Republic Airplay (ČNS IFPI)	6
Denmark (Tracklisten)	5
European Hot 100 Singles (Billboard)	1
Finland (Suomen virallinen lista)	2
France (SNEP)	5
France Download (SNEP)	3
France Airplay (SNEP)	1
Germany (GfK)	3
Hungary (Dance Top 40)	31
Hungary (Rádiós Top 40)	1
Ireland (IRMA)	1
Israel International Airplay (Media Forest)	2
Italy (FIMI)	3
Japan Hot 100 (Billboard)	10
Netherlands (Dutch Top 40)	2
Netherlands (Single Top 100)	6
New Zealand (Recorded Music NZ)	1
Norway (VG-lista)	5
Poland Airplay (ZPAV)	1
Polish Dance Chart	8
Portugal Digital Song Sales (Billboard)	2
Russia Airplay (TopHit)	34
Scottish Singles Sales (Official Charts)	1
Slovakia Airplay (ČNS IFPI)	2
Spain (Promusicae)	17
Sweden (Sverigetopplistan)	8
Switzerland (Schweizer Hitparade)	4
UK Singles (Official Charts)	1
US Billboard Hot 100	1
US Adult Contemporary (Billboard)	7
US Adult Pop Airplay (Billboard)	1
US Dance Club Songs (Billboard)	1
US Dance Airplay (Billboard)	1
US Pop Airplay (Billboard)	1
US Rhythmic Airplay (Billboard)	4
Venezuela Pop Rock (Record Report)	1

=== Year-end charts ===
Chart (2010)	Position
Australia (ARIA)	5
Austria (Ö3 Austria Top 40)	16
Belgium (Ultratop 50 Flanders)	24
Belgium (Ultratop 50 Wallonia)	17
Brazil (Crowley)	18
Canada (Canadian Hot 100)	1
CIS (TopHit)	115
Croatia International Airplay (HRT)	14
Denmark (Tracklisten)	30
Europe (European Hot 100 Singles)	14
France (SNEP)	20
Germany (Media Control AG)	20
Hungary (Rádiós Top 40)	14
Ireland (IRMA)	10
Italy (FIMI)	12
Italy Airplay (EarOne)	16
Japan Hot 100 (Billboard)	23
Japan Adult Contemporary (Billboard)	2
Netherlands (Dutch Top 40)	10
Netherlands (Single Top 100)	17
New Zealand (RIANZ)	3
Romania (Romanian Top 100)	94
Russia Airplay (TopHit)	151
South Korea Foreign (Circle)	93
Spain (PROMUSICAE)	13
Sweden (Sverigetopplistan)	39
Switzerland (Schweizer Hitparade)	18
UK Singles (Official Charts)	8
US Billboard Hot 100	4
US Adult Contemporary (Billboard)	17
US Adult Top 40 (Billboard)	7
US Dance Club Songs (Billboard)	5
US Dance/Mix Show Airplay (Billboard)	15
US Mainstream Top 40 (Billboard)	5
US Rhythmic (Billboard)	17
Worldwide (IFPI)	6

Chart (2011)	Position
Hungary (Rádiós Top 40)	92

=== Decade-end charts ===
Chart (2010–2019)	Position
US Billboard Hot 100	49

== Certifications and sales ==
Region	Certification	Certified units/sales
Australia (ARIA)	11× Platinum	770,000^{‡}
Austria (IFPI Austria)	2× Platinum	60,000^{*}
Belgium (BRMA)	Gold	15,000^{*}
Brazil (Pro-Música Brasil)	2× Platinum	120,000^{‡}
Canada (Music Canada)	Diamond	800,000^{‡}
Denmark (IFPI Danmark)	2× Platinum	180,000^{‡}
Finland	2× Platinum	8,000
France (SNEP)	Platinum	200,000^{‡}
Germany (BVMI)	Platinum	300,000^{^}
Italy (FIMI)	Platinum	30,000^{*}
Japan (RIAJ) PC download	Gold	100,000^{*}
Mexico (AMPROFON)	Gold	30,000^{*}
New Zealand (RMNZ)	5× Platinum	150,000^{‡}
Norway (IFPI Norway)	3× Platinum	180,000^{‡}
South Korea	—	150,988 (Note: South Korea sales figures as of December 2010.)
Spain (Promusicae)	Gold	30,000^{‡}
Sweden (GLF)	Platinum	40,000^{‡}
Switzerland (IFPI Switzerland)	Platinum	30,000^{^}
United Kingdom (BPI)	3× Platinum	1,800,000 (Note: United Kingdom sales figures as of June 2024.)
United States (RIAA)	Diamond	10,000,000^{‡}
Ringtone
Canada (Music Canada)	Platinum	40,000^{*}
Japan (RIAJ) Full-length ringtone	Gold	100,000^{*}
Streaming
Greece (IFPI Greece)	Gold	1,000,000^{†}
Summaries
Worldwide	—	13,000,000 (Note: Worldwide sales figures as of May 2022.)
^{*} Sales figures based on certification alone.^{^} Shipments figures based on certification alone.^{‡} Sales+streaming figures based on certification alone.^{†} Streaming-only figures based on certification alone.

== Release history ==
Release dates and formats for "California Gurls"
Region	Date	Format(s)	Version(s)	Label	Ref.
Various	May 7, 2010	Digital download; streaming	Original	Capitol	
Italy	May 14, 2010	Radio airplay	Original	Polydor	
United States	May 25, 2010	Contemporary hit radio; rhythmic contemporary radio	Original	Capitol	
United States	June 7, 2010	Hot adult contemporary radio	Original	Capitol	
United States	June 10, 2010	CD	Original	Capitol	
Germany	June 11, 2010	CD	Original	Capitol	
United Kingdom	June 21, 2010	Digital download	Original	Capitol	
United Kingdom	June 29, 2010	CD	Original	Capitol	
United Kingdom	July 16, 2010	Digital download	Remixes (Note: British and French edition contains MSTRKRFT main mix as the first track of the EP, while the US edition starts with Armand Van Helden remix.)	Capitol	
France	July 20, 2010	Digital download	Remixes	Capitol	
United States	July 20, 2010	Digital download	Remixes	Capitol	

== See also ==
- List of best-selling singles
- List of best-selling singles in the United States
- List of number-one singles in Australia in 2010
- List of number-one pop hits of 2010 (Brazil)
- List of Hot 100 number-one singles of 2010 (Canada)
- List of European number-one hits of 2010
- List of number-one singles in 2010 (Hungary)
- List of number-one singles of 2010 (Ireland)
- List of number-one singles in 2010 (New Zealand)
- List of number-one singles of 2010 (Scotland)
- List of number-one singles from the 2010s (UK)
- List of number-one dance singles of 2010 (US)
- List of number-one dance airplay hits of 2010 (US)
- List of Billboard Hot 100 number-one singles of 2010
- List of Hot Adult Top 40 Tracks number-one singles of 2010
- List of Mainstream Top 40 number-one hits of 2010 (US)
- List of number-one singles of 2010 (Poland)
