= Little Secret =

Studio album by Nikki Yanofsky
- Released: October 7, 2014
- Studio: Planet Studio (Montreal), Studio Edison (Los Angeles)
- Label: A440 Entertainment
- Producer: Quincy Jones

Nikki Yanofsky chronology
Nikki (2010)	Little Secret (2014)	Solid Gold EP (2016)

Singles from Little Secret
- 1. "Something New" Released: September 3, 2013; 2. "Necessary Evil" Released: April 22, 2014; 3. "Kaboom Pow" Released: March 30, 2015

Little Secret is the third studio album by Canadian singer Nikki Yanofsky. It was released on October 7, 2014. The album charted at number 13 on Billboard's Top Jazz Albums chart, and the single "Necessary Evil" reached number 52 on the Canadian Hot 100.

== Track listing ==
No.	Title	Writer(s)	Length
1.	"Something New"	Herbie Hancock / Quincy Jones / Rob Kleiner / Nikki Yanofsky	2:52
2.	"Blessed With Your Curse"	Kleiner / Yanofsky	3:25
3.	"Waiting on the Sun"	Max Frost / Yanofsky	3:55
4.	"Necessary Evil"	Charles Aznavour / Courtney Harrell / Harmony Samuels / Yanofsky	3:46
5.	"Little Secret"	Adam Dornblum / Matt Morris / Yanofsky	3:19
6.	"Jeepers Creepers 2.0"	Johnny Mercer / Harry Warren	3:00
7.	"Out of Nowhere"	David Wilder / Yanofsky	3:29
8.	"You Mean the World to Me"	Wilder / Yanofsky	2:29
9.	"Knock Knock"	Dornblum / Yanofsky	3:00
10.	"Enough of You"	Clarence Coffee, Jr. / Kleiner / Yanofsky	3:12
11.	"Bang"	Frost / Yanofsky	3:10
12.	"Kaboom Pow"	Frost / Kleiner / Yanofsky	3:20
Total length:			38:57

== Charts ==
Chart (2014)	Peak position
Canadian Albums (Billboard)	4
US Top Jazz Albums (Billboard)	13
