= Lipstick (Elise Estrada song) =

Single by Elise Estrada

from the album Here Kitty Kittee
- Released: October 2010
- Genre: Pop, R&B
- Label: RockSTAR Music Corp.; Universal Music Group
- Songwriters: Elise Estrada, Adam Hurstfield, Davor Vulama

Elise Estrada singles chronology
"You're So Hollywood" (2010)	"Lipstick" (2010)	"Piece of Me" (2012)

"Lipstick" is a song by the Canadian singer Elise Estrada. It peaked at number 46 on the Canadian Hot 100.

== Music video ==
The music video was shot in London, England.

== Charts ==
Chart (2010)	Peak position
Canada Hot 100 (Billboard)	46
Canada CHR/Top 40 (Billboard)	28
Canada Hot AC (Billboard)	23
