= Stephan Moccio =

- Born: October 20, 1972 (age 53); St. Catharines, Ontario, Canada
- Occupations: Songwriter; composer; record producer; pianist; recording artist
- Instruments: Piano; vocals
- Labels: Universal Publishing; Decca

Stephan Moccio is a Canadian composer, producer, pianist, arranger, conductor and recording artist. He co-wrote and co-produced the two end credit songs for Fifty Shades of Grey and its soundtrack: "Earned It" (The Weeknd) and "I Know You" (Skylar Grey), with the former being nominated for Best R&B Song and Best Song Written For Visual Media at the 58th Annual Grammy Awards, and Best Original Song at the 88th Academy Awards. He also was a producer on the Weeknd's album Beauty Behind the Madness, which was nominated for Album Of The Year at the 58th Annual Grammy Awards.

Moccio co-wrote Celine Dion's hit "A New Day Has Come" with Aldo Nova, which reached and held the number one spot on the Billboard AC Chart for a record-breaking 21 weeks. He also co-wrote Miley Cyrus' single "Wrecking Ball" from her 2013 studio album Bangerz. For the Vancouver 2010 Winter Olympics, Moccio co-wrote the theme song “I Believe” performed by Nikki Yanofsky.

He has collaborated with a diverse roster of artists including Avril Lavigne and Andrea Bocelli as a songwriter, musician and producer.

== Early life ==
Stephan Moccio was born to an Italian-Canadian father and a French-Canadian mother. Moccio is fluent in English and French. Growing up in Niagara Falls, Moccio began his piano studies at the age of 3. His musical style and vocabulary are influenced by the musical genres of classical, jazz, pop, hip hop, blues, and dance.

== Career ==
Moccio enrolled at the University of Western Ontario where he studied performance and classical piano studies under instructors John Paul Bracey and Jack Behrens. After completing a Bachelor of Arts degree in composition and piano performance in 1994, he was accepted into Berklee College of Music. However, he chose to focus on developing his professional career and instead signed a publishing deal with Sony/ATV Music Publishing. During the early years of his tenure at Sony/ATV, Moccio worked as a session musician, in-house producer, arranger and composer, attending rehearsals of the Toronto Symphony Orchestra, and playing in Toronto jazz clubs and hotel lounges, notably the Four Seasons Hotel's La Serre.

Throughout his nearly 9-year tenure at Sony/ATV, Moccio wrote for several award-winning Canadian and international artists, most notably Celine Dion, Sarah Brightman, and Josh Groban. Moccio spent many months in writing sessions in Nashville, Los Angeles, and New York during these years, which culminated in a lengthy catalogue of songs as musician, songwriter, producer and composer.

It was in 1996 that Moccio's special relationship with television programs began. TV themes he has written, performed and produced include ETalk, Marilyn Dennis Show, W5, Your Morning and for Rogers Sportsnet Central, Hockey Central, and Toronto Blue Jays on Sportsnet.

In 2001, Moccio began work on a melody that would become the chart-topping single "A New Day Has Come" recorded by Celine Dion, released on her album (in both a radio mix version and 3/4 time ballad album version), of the same name in February 2002. The song broke records at the time by maintaining the #1 position on the U.S. Hot Adult Contemporary charts for 21 weeks. The single would make it onto numerous compilation CDs and DVDs in North America. In 2003, Celine Dion titled her live residency Las Vegas show A New Day....

In 2003, Moccio left Sony/ATV Music Publishing Canada to work predominantly under his own publishing company, Sing Little Penguin. He soon moved into his state-of-the-art recording studio in downtown Toronto, where he continued to write, record, produce for both his solo projects and various collaborations with recording artists.

In 2008 Moccio teamed up with songwriter Alan Frew (Glass Tiger) to write "I Believe", the theme song of CTV's and Rogers Media's Canada's Olympic Broadcast Media Consortium for the Vancouver 2010 Olympic Winter Games. On March 1, 2010, "I Believe", covered by Nikki Yanofsky, reached 4 x Platinum status (CRIA) in digital sales (over 160,000 digital units sold) in Canada. The same version achieved #1 status on iTunes Canada and Billboard's Canadian Hot 100 for 4 straight weeks in February 2010.

In February 2010, Moccio signed a Worldwide Publishing deal with Universal Music Publishing Group.

In 2012, Moccio was one of the judges of the Canadian reality show, Canada's Got Talent. The show was later cancelled after one season but was revived in 2022.

In August 2013, Moccio moved to Los Angeles and currently works out of his record studio in Santa Monica.

In June 2019, Moccio was honoured by the University of Western Ontario with a Doctor of Music, honoris causa (DMus) degree.

In November 2019, Moccio signed a worldwide record deal with Decca Records.

Moccio is a Yamaha Artist and performs exclusively on Yamaha Pianos.

His album Lionheart was a Juno Award nominee for Instrumental Album of the Year at the Juno Awards of 2023.

== Selected discography ==
=== As composer, songwriter or producer ===
Title	Artist (Label)	Album	Year	Credit	Notes
"A New Day Has Come"	Celine Dion (Sony)	A New Day Has Come	2002	Co-writer (Aldo Nova), background vocals	#1 SOCAN Award, BMI Pop Award, SOCAN Classic Song Award, Juno nomination for Single of the Year (2003), Million-air award (over 1,000,000 BDS spins on US radio) • produced by Walter Afanasieff • album 7 weeks at #1 in Canada (6× Platinum - CRIA), #1 US (3xPlatinum - RIAA), #1 Europe (3xPlatinum - IFPI) • 5th best-selling album of 2002 • Vegas show A New Day...
"Earned It (Fifty Shades of Grey)"	The Weeknd (Republic)	Fifty Shades of Grey Soundtrack	2015	Co-writer, co-producer, piano	#3 US Billboard Hot 100 • 4× Platinum (RIAA) • #9 Billboard Hot 100 Year End Chart 2015
"I Believe"	Nikki Yanofsky (Decca)	Nikki	2010	Co-writer (Alan Frew), producer, piano	#1 (4 weeks) Canadian Billboard Hot 100 and certified 4× Platinum (CRIA), nomination - Best AC Song (Canadian Radio Music Awards) • album certified gold (CRIA)
"I Know You"	Holly Hafermann KIDinaKORNER, Interscope	Fifty Shades of Grey: Original Motion Picture Soundtrack	2015	Co-writer, co-production	
"Perfect Gift"	The Canadian Tenors (Decca)	The Perfect Gift	2010	Co-writer, producer	Album #1 Billboard Cross-over Classical chart, certified 3× Platinum (CRIA)
"What You Never Know"	Sarah Brightman (Angel/EMI)	Harem	2003	Writer	Also recorded in French for the Canadian release "Tout Ce Que Je Sais" • album certified Gold (CRIA), reaching #29 US Billboard Top 200 and #7 Canada album charts; #1 Classical US Billboard album chart • #5 best-selling crossover album of 2003 (Billboard)
"Wrecking Ball"	Miley Cyrus (RCA)	Bangerz	2013	co-writer Sacha Skarbek, Lukasz Gottwald, Maureen Anne McDonald, Henry Russell Walter, piano	4× Platinum (RIAA) • Produced by Dr. Luke • peaked #1 (3 weeks) on Billboard Hot 100
"Hope"	Kardinal Offishall (Black Stone Colleagues)	Kardi Gras, Vol. 1: The Clash	2015	Co-writer, producer	
"Head Above Water"	Avril Lavigne (BMG)	Head Above Water	2018	co-writer with Avril Lavigne & Travis Clark	
"Courage"	Celine Dion (Columbia)	Courage	2019	Co-writer with The New Royales, producer	
A Family Christmas	Andrea Bocelli, Matteo Bocelli, Virginia Bocelli (Decca / Capitol Records)	A Family Christmas	2022	Producer / Composer	

=== As recording artist ===
Year	Album / single details	Peak			Certifications (sales threshold)
Year	Album / single details	CA	Quebec Album Chart	iTunes Album Chart	Certifications (sales threshold)
2006	Exposure: Released: November 14, 2006; Label: Bijou Records (Universal Music Canada); Format: CD, digital download; Writer / Producer: S. Moccio	10	1	4	CAN: Gold
2020	"Fracture" (Single): Released: April 17, 2020; Label: Decca Records; Writer / Producer: S. Moccio				
2020	"Whitby" (Single): Released: May 1, 2020; Label: Decca Records; Writer / Producer: S. Moccio				
2020	"Sea Change" (Single): Released: May 15, 2020; Label: Decca Records; Writer / Producer: S. Moccio				
2020	"Nuit Blanche" (Single): Released: May 29, 2020; Label: Decca Records; Writer / Producer: S. Moccio				
2020	"Le Temps Qui Passe" (Single): Released: June 12, 2020; Label: Decca Records; Writer / Producer: S. Moccio				
2020	"Burgundy" (Single): Released: July 10, 2020; Label: Decca Records; Writer / Producer: S. Moccio				
2020	"Freddie's Theme" (Single): Released: July 24, 2020; Label: Decca Records; Writer / Producer: S. Moccio				
2020	"Ghosts" (Single): Released: August 14, 2020; Label: Decca Records; Writer / Producer: S. Moccio				
2020	Tales of Solace (Album): Released: August 28, 2020; Label: Decca Records; Writer / Producer: S. Moccio				
2020	"Carol of the Bells" / "Christmas Time is Here" (Singles): Released: October 22, 2020; Label: Decca Records; Writer / Producer: S. Moccio				
2020	Winter Poems (Album): Released: November 6, 2020; Label: Decca Records; Writer / Producer: S. Moccio				
2020	"Christmas Will Be Different This Year" (Single): Released: November 13, 2020; Label: Decca Records; Writer / Producer: S. Moccio				
2021	"Ow" (Single): Released: January 22, 2021; Label: Decca Records; Writer / Producer: S. Moccio				
2021	"Vol. 1" (Single): Released: January 29, 2021; Label: Decca Records; Writer / Producer: S. Moccio				
2021	"Earned it (Solo Piano)" (Single): Released: February 8, 2021; Label: Decca Records; Writer / Producer: S. Moccio				
2021	"Adore" (Single): February 12, 2021; Label: Decca Records; Writer / Producer: S. Moccio				
2021	"Vol. 2" (Single): Released: February 26, 2021; Label: Decca Records; Writer / Producer: S. Moccio				
2021	"Matin" (Single): Released: March 19, 2021; Label: Decca Records; Writer / Producer: S. Moccio				
2021	"Vol. 3" (Single): Released: March 26, 2021; Label: Decca Records; Writer / Producer: S. Moccio				
2021	"Wrecking Ball - Solo Piano Version" (Single): Released: March 29, 2021; Label: Decca Records; Writer / Producer: S. Moccio				
2021	"October" (Single): Released: April 16, 2021; Label: Decca Records; Writer / Producer: S. Moccio				
2021	Vol. 4 (Album): Released: April 30, 2021; Label: Decca Records; Writer / Producer: S. Moccio				
2021	"Tristesse" (Single): Released: Mat 14, 2021; Label: Decca Records; Writer / Producer: S. Moccio				
2021	Vol. 5 (Album): Released: May 28, 2021; Label: Decca Records; Writer / Producer: S. Moccio				
2021	"Manolete" (Single): Released: June 11, 2021; Label: Decca Records; Writer / Producer: S. Moccio				
2021	Vol. 6 (Album): Released: June 25, 2021; Label: Decca Records; Writer / Producer: S. Moccio				
2021	"Life" (Single): Released: July 16, 2021; Label: Decca Records; Writer / Producer: S. Moccio				
2021	"Vol. 7" (Single): Released: July 30, 2021; Label: Decca Records; Writer / Producer: S. Moccio				
2021	"Le Jardin de Monsieur Monet" (Single): Released: August 25, 2021; Label: Decca Records; Writer / Producer: S. Moccio				
2021	"Fireflies" (Single): Released: September 10, 2021; Label: Decca Records; Writer / Producer: S. Moccio				
2021	"Halston" (Single): Released: September 24, 2021; Label: Decca Records; Writer / Producer: S. Moccio				
2021	"Castles in Spain" (Single): Released: October 8, 2021; Label: Decca Records; Writer / Producer: S. Moccio				
2021	Lionheart (Album): Released: October 15, 2021; Label: Decca Records; Writer / Producer: S. Moccio				
2021	"Winter Waltz (The Music Box Version)" (Single): Released: December 10, 2021; Label: Decca Records; Writer / Producer: S. Moccio				
2021	The Archives (Album): Released: December 17, 2021; Label: Decca Records; Writer / Producer: S. Moccio				
2022	"Blue Monday" (Single): Released: January 17, 2022; Label: Decca Records; Writer / Producer: S. Moccio				
2022	"Owl Light" (Single): Released: March 4, 2022; Label: Decca Records; Writer / Producer: S. Moccio				
2022	"2 Eventide" (Single): Released: March 11, 2022; Label: Decca Records; Writer / Producer: S. Moccio				
2022	"The Night Suite" (Single): Released: March 18, 2022; Label: Decca Records; Writer / Producer: S. Moccio				
2022	"Brian's Song" (Single): Released: May 27, 2022; Label: Decca Records; Writer / Producer: S. Moccio				
2023	"Once and Now" (Single): Released: February 24, 2023; Label: PPG Music / Stage One; Writers / Producers: S. Moccio & Pierpaolo Guierrini				

== General references ==
- Canada's National Art Centre Stephan Moccio in Concert
- Hope and Cope Foundation Soiree Fantastique
- Stephan Moccio's Profile on Artist Direct
- Kerr, Peter. "Stephan Moccio's I Believe - CTV's Olympic broadcast anthem becomes Canada's 15th "Gold performance". The Montrealer. Archived from the original on July 17, 2011.
- Christman, Ed (March 5, 2010). "UMPG Inks Deal With Stephan Moccio". Billboard. Archived from the original on February 25, 2010.
- "New Bilingual I Believe / J'Imagine Video To Debut Before Vancouver 2010 Closing Ceremony". CTV. February 28, 2010. Archived from the original on March 5, 2010.
- Thompson, Robert; Paine, Andre (February 18, 2010). "Olympic Anthem Tops Billboard Canadian Hot 100". Billboard. Archived from the original on February 25, 2010.
- Bradshaw, James (January 20, 2010). "Olympic theme song a long time in the making". The Globe and Mail.
- Billboard Canadian Hot 100
- Stephan Moccio at Sugarcain Entertainment
- Ayroso, Crissandra (October 17, 2006). "Stephan Moccio Emerges From Behind The Scenes to Release Solo Debut". Chart. Archived from the original on June 7, 2011.
- Stephan Moccio at Songwriter Universe
- Debbage, Michael. "Moccio - Color".
- Sage, Amanda. "Stephan Moccio, composer-songwriter-producer-musician".
- "Stephan Moccio".
- Mandel, Mike. ""Color" a New CD by Moccio".
- Terauds, John (November 8, 2010). ""Color" a New CD Review". The Star. Toronto.
