= Solid Gold EP =

EP by Nikki Yanofsky
- Released: September 30, 2016 (Canada)
- Recorded: 2015–16
- Genre: Jazz, pop
- Label: A440 Entertainment
- Producer: Wyclef Jean

Nikki Yanofsky chronology
Little Secret (2014)	Solid Gold EP (2016)	Turn Down the Sound (2020)

Singles from Solid Gold EP
- 1. "Young Love" Released: July 22, 2016; 2. "Miss You When I'm Drunk" Released: September 29, 2016

The Solid Gold EP is an extended play by Canadian singer Nikki Yanofsky. The EP was released on September 30, 2016 in Canada, and was released in the rest of the world on October 28, 2016.

== Background and development ==
In this EP Nikki Y wanted to get personal with her and her boyfriend. This album talks about her together with her boyfriend. She has kept her relationship personal until now. On her last album Little Secret, she wanted to bring together pop, and jazz. On this album, it is more about her voice. Another song was released called "I Know Sorry" which is not featured on the EP, but is anticipated to be on the new full album. "Too Many Songs" ft. Wyclef Jean is another song that Yanofsky announced was coming out that is not featured on the EP.

== Singles ==
The EP features the singles "Young Love" and "Miss You When I'm Drunk". The latter was written when Yanofsky and her boyfriend broke up for two weeks. "My boyfriend and I broke up for about two weeks, two years into our relationship (we have now been together six years). Needless to say, those two weeks sucked. I'd tell myself I was fine during the day, but then I'd sleep in his t-shirts and with the teddy bear he got me at night. I wrote a song about how the truth really only came out when I went out and was at the same bar as him," said Yanofsky.

== Promotion ==
Yanofsky says that in the summer, when her full album comes out, she will be touring to promote the album.

== Track listing ==
All tracks are written by Nikki Yanofsky & Wyclef Jean

No.	Title	Length
1.	"Young Love"	3:23
2.	"Best of Me"	3:32
3.	"Me, Myself & I"	3:31
4.	"Miss You When I'm Drunk"	3:14
5.	"Young Love (Acoustic)"	3:06
6.	"To No.1"	3:04
Total length:		19:55
