= Elise Estrada (album) =

Studio album by Elise Estrada
- Released: September 16, 2008
- Recorded: 2007–2008
- Genre: Pop; R&B
- Length: 34:49
- Label: RockSTAR Music Corp.; Universal Music Group
- Producer: Michael Hektoen (exec. prod.); Anthony Anderson; Dane DeViller; Sean Hosein; Adam H. Hurstfield; Steve Smith

Elise Estrada chronology
Elise Estrada (EP) (2004)	Elise Estrada (2008)	Here Kitty Kittee (2010)

Singles from Elise Estrada
- 1. "Insatiable" Released: June 2, 2007; 2. "Ix-Nay" Released: September 2007; 3. "Unlove You" Released: December 22, 2007; 4. "These 3 Words" Released: May 2008; 5. "Crash & Burn" Released: September 2008; 6. "Poison" Released: March 2009; 7. "One Last Time" Released: August 2009

Elise Estrada is the debut album by Filipino-Canadian singer Elise Estrada. Initially supposed to be released in May 2008, it was later released on September 16, 2008, through RockSTAR Music Corp. and Universal Music Group. The album was recorded immediately upon Estrada signing onto RockSTAR Music Corp in 2007 and slowly released three successful singles within that year: "Insataible", "Ix-Nay", and "Unlove You". Most of the lyrical concepts focus on different stages of relationship and heartbreak. The album's musical range is predominantly pop, mixed with elements of rock, urban contemporary and R&B.

== Reception ==
Professional ratings
Review scores
Source	Rating
Allmusic	3/5 stars

Upon its release, Elise Estrada received generally positive reviews from most critics and has since earned Estrada several accolades, including a nomination for Best R&B/Soul Recording of the Year in the 2009 Juno Awards. The album peaked at number 98 on the Canadian Album Chart, becoming the only charting album by Estrada. The album produced two number one singles on Canada Top 40: "Insatiable" for six consecutive weeks and "Unlove You". "Unlove You" also became Estrada's most successful single on the Canadian Billboard Hot 100, reaching the Top 20 spot at number 11.

== Track listing ==
Elise Estrada
No.	Title	Length
1.	"Unlove You"	3:11
2.	"Insatiable"	3:48
3.	"One Last Time"	3:31
4.	"Poison"	3:36
5.	"Crash & Burn"	3:26
6.	"Just Want You" (featuring Jah Fus)	3:10
7.	"S.O.S."	3:58
8.	"Torture"	4:00
9.	"These 3 Words"	2:54
10.	"Ix-Nay"	3:15

== Notes ==
The rights to the song "Torture" were surrendered, allowing Filipino-American duo Rin on the Rox to re-record the song. The song's pop beat rhythm is similar to the pop beat rhythm of Justin Timberlake's "What Goes Around... Comes Around".

The first notes to the song "Poison" sound like the intro to Croatian pop legend Duško Lokin's 1978 song "Volim Te" ("I Love You").

The melody of the intro and chorus to the song "One Last Time" sounds like Kenny Rogers' 1978 hit "The Gambler".
