= Buckles and Boots =

Studio album by Ridley Bent
- Released: November 27, 2007
- Genre: Country
- Length: 47:09
- Label: Open Road
- Producer: John MacArthur Ellis

Ridley Bent chronology
Blam! (2005)	Buckles and Boots (2007)	Rabbit on My Wheel (2010)

Professional ratings
Review scores
Source	Rating
Allmusic	link
PopMatters	link

Buckles and Boots is the second studio album by Canadian country-rock artist Ridley Bent. The album was released on November 27, 2007, by Open Road Recordings. Its first single, "Heartland Heartbreak," reached the Top 30 on the Canadian Country Singles chart.

== Track listing ==
1. "Slim Chance" - 0:32
  - rodeo intro
2. "Buckles and Boots" (Ridley Bent) - 4:10
3. "Nine Inch Nails" (Bent, Dustin Bentall) - 3:56
4. "Cry" (Bent, Bentall, Cameron Latimer) - 4:01
5. "Heartland Heartbreak" (Bent) - 4:33
6. "Arlington" (Bent, Karly Warkentin) - 4:40
7. "Stand in Line" (Bent) - 3:12
8. "Bobby and Suzanne" (Bent) - 4:29
9. "Faded Red Hoodie" (Bent) - 3:56
10. "Mama" (Bent) - 5:06
11. "Apache Hairlifter" (Bent, Adam Dobres, Latimer) - 8:34
