= Big Mouth (Nikki Yanofsky song) =

2018 song by Nikki Yanofsky

Single by Nikki Yanofsky
- Language: English; French
- Released: September 14, 2018
- Genre: Pop
- Length: 3:18
- Label: eOne music
- Songwriter(s): Nikki Yanofsky
- Producer(s): Andrew Dawson

Nikki Yanofsky singles chronology
"Miss You When I'm Drunk" (2016)	"Big Mouth" (2018)	"Mistletoe" (2018)

Music video
- "Big Mouth" on YouTube

"Big Mouth" is a song by Canadian musician Nikki Yanofsky. The song was released on September 14, 2018 as a single from Nikki's upcoming album, Big Mouth. Nikki Yanofsky teased for a music video for the song on her Instagram, that contained a tribute to the talented jazz musician, Aretha Franklin. She recorded the music video for the song before Aretha Franklin's death. The song was accidentally leaked on Nikki's management website for two days on August 22 and 23 until it was taken down.

== Composition ==
Nikki announced on her Twitter that the song was inspired by the 2017 Women's March.

== Release ==
Yanofsky announced that she had a new song coming out on her Twitter on January 20, 2018. On September 7, 2018 Yanofsky unveiled the single art for the song, which depicts her wearing large Octangular glasses and a gold chain with her name on it. The song was released in French and English on September 14, 2018.

== Music video ==
A music video for the song was released on Vevo on September 25, 2018. The video was directed by Emma Higgins. The song currently has over 100,000 views.

== Track listing ==
No.	Title	Length
1.	"Big Mouth"	3:23
2.	"Big Mouth" (French version)	3:25
Total length:		6:48

== Chart performance ==
The song peaked at number 40 on the Canada AC chart, and was on the chart for 18 weeks.

== Charts ==
Chart (2019)	Peak position
Canada AC (Billboard)	40
