= The Tenors =

Canadian operatic pop vocal group

- Also known as: The Canadian Tenors
- Origin: Victoria, British Columbia, Canada and Costa Rica
- Genre: Operatic pop
- Years active: 2004–present
- Labels: Universal Music Canada; Decca; Verve
- Members: Mark Masri; Eduardo Aguirre; Victor Micallef; Clifton Murray
- Past members: Remigio Pereira; Alberto Urso; Jamie McKnight; Fraser Walters; Joey Niceforo; Philip Grant; Ken Lavigne; Paul Ouellette; Frederik Robert; Craig Ashton; Leon Leontaridis; Giovanni Amenta; Peter McCutcheon
- Website: tenorsmusic.com

The Tenors (formerly known as The Canadian Tenors) are a vocal group consisting of Victor Micallef, Clifton Murray, Eduardo Aguirre, and Mark Masri. They perform operatic pop music that is a mixture of classical and pop, featuring songs such as "The Prayer", Panis angelicus, and Leonard Cohen's Hallelujah.

Originating from Canada, Micallef and Masri from Toronto, Aguirre from Costa Rica, and Murray from Port McNeill, the Tenors have performed on more than 60 international television programs. They appeared on the Oprah Winfrey Show with Celine Dion in 2010, at the opening ceremonies of the 2010 Winter Olympics in Vancouver, at the 63rd Primetime Emmy Awards in 2011, and on ITV's Diamond Jubilee Show at Windsor Castle for Queen Elizabeth II in 2012. They also appeared on the 2009 and 2016 Grey Cup broadcasts, on CBC Television's Holiday Festival of Ice, and at the 85th Annual Rockefeller Tree Lighting which aired on NBC on November 29, 2017.

The venues they have performed in include Carnegie Hall in New York, the Kennedy Center in Washington, DC, the Israeli Opera House in Tel Aviv, and the Mandalay Bay Events Center in Las Vegas.

They have shared the stage with Sarah McLachlan, Neil Young, Paul Anka, Justin Bieber, Charice, Paul McCartney, Brian McKnight, David Foster, Natalie Cole, and Jackie Evancho.

Universal Music Group released their platinum-selling self-titled debut album and double-platinum holiday album, The Perfect Gift, in November 2009. The Tenors filmed a PBS special at the Smith Center for the Performing Arts that began airing in 2012.

The Canadian Tenors were renamed The Tenors in November 2012 in advance of their third album, Lead with Your Heart and signed a US distribution deal with Verve Records. Lead with Your Heart went platinum in Canada in seven weeks. The album garnered a 2013 JUNO Award for Adult Contemporary Album of the Year and a JUNO nomination for the Jack Richardson Producer of the Year Award for Bob Ezrin's production of "Forever Young". Lead with Your Heart was featured on Katie, Good Morning America, Access Hollywood, ET Canada, CNN Morning Live, e-Talk and FOX & Friends.

== Career ==
=== Origin ===
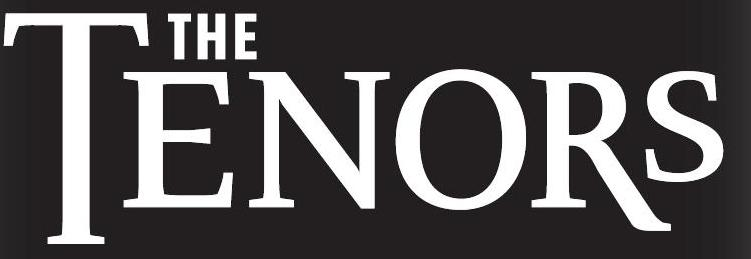
Logo

The group was the creation of Jill Ann Siemens, originally as a trio (Philip Grant, Paul Ouellette, and Ken Lavigne) and debuted in 2004 in Victoria. In 2005, a new re-envisioned group consisting of Craig Ashton, Joey Niceforo and Leon Leontaridis released their self-titled debut The Canadian Tenors (Warner). Siemens then did a cross-Canada search to find four new voices and chose Micalle, Remigio Pereira, Walters, and Jamie McKnight. They released their second self-titled album The Canadian Tenors in 2009.

Walters, Micallef, and Pereira sang a repertoire of popular and classical music together for seven years. In January 2009 Clifton Murray replaced Jamie McKnight.

=== 2009–2011: The Perfect Gift ===
The band released their first holiday album The Perfect Gift on November 3, 2009, which was later certified platinum by Music Canada.

In September of that year, the group toured with David Foster as the opening act. They performed O Canada at the 2009 Grey Cup game.

On February 10, 2010, the Tenors appeared on The Oprah Winfrey Show. Unbeknownst to them, Oprah Winfrey had arranged for a surprise; midway through their rendition of "Hallelujah", Celine Dion came onstage and sang the rest of the song with the group.

The Perfect Gift was released in the US on October 12, 2010, and has since peaked at #7 on the Top Holiday Albums Chart.

On December 13, 2010, The group performed during a holiday special called Canadian Tenors and Friends, which drew 957,000 viewers. The performance included the Tenors, Justin Bieber, and Jackie Evancho.

The Canadian Tenors appeared at the 2011 Emmy Awards, performing a version of Leonard Cohen's song "Hallelujah".

Another special called Season of Song featuring the Tenors aired December 14, 2011, attracting 743,000 viewers.

=== 2012–2014: Lead with Your Heart ===
The band announced on July 25, 2012, that they were signed by David Foster to Verve Records.

The group's third album Lead with Your Heart was released in Canada on October 9, 2012, through Universal Music Canada. Lead with Your Heart is a 12- track classical crossover album. It includes covers of Forever Young, Amazing Grace and Nessun Dorma. The album also includes new compositions written by The Tenors. Walter Afanasieff, Bob Ezrin, and Marco Marinangeli have production and co-writing credits on the album.

The album's first single "I Believe" was released on iTunes on July 24, 2012, and was sampled on CTV during the 2012 Summer Olympics.

The album was released in the United States on January 15, 2013, and debuted at No. 1 on the Classical Crossover Albums chart and No. 21 on Billboard 200, selling 16,000 copies in its first week.

The group was awarded the Queen Elizabeth II Diamond Jubilee Medal on January 24, 2013.

On August 2, 2013, Lead with Your Heart was released in the United Kingdom. Later that year The Tenors appeared on the BBC's Strictly Come Dancing.

In October 2013, The Tenors released the single "I Thank You" with Big Brothers Big Sisters of America spokesperson and Miss America 2012 Laura Kaeppeler to benefit Big Brothers Big Sisters of Canada.

Conceived by Kenny Munshaw and co-written with The Tenors and Marc Jordan, "I Thank You" was recorded in London and produced by Grammy nominated producer and songwriter Sacha Skarbek.

=== 2015–2016: Under One Sky ===
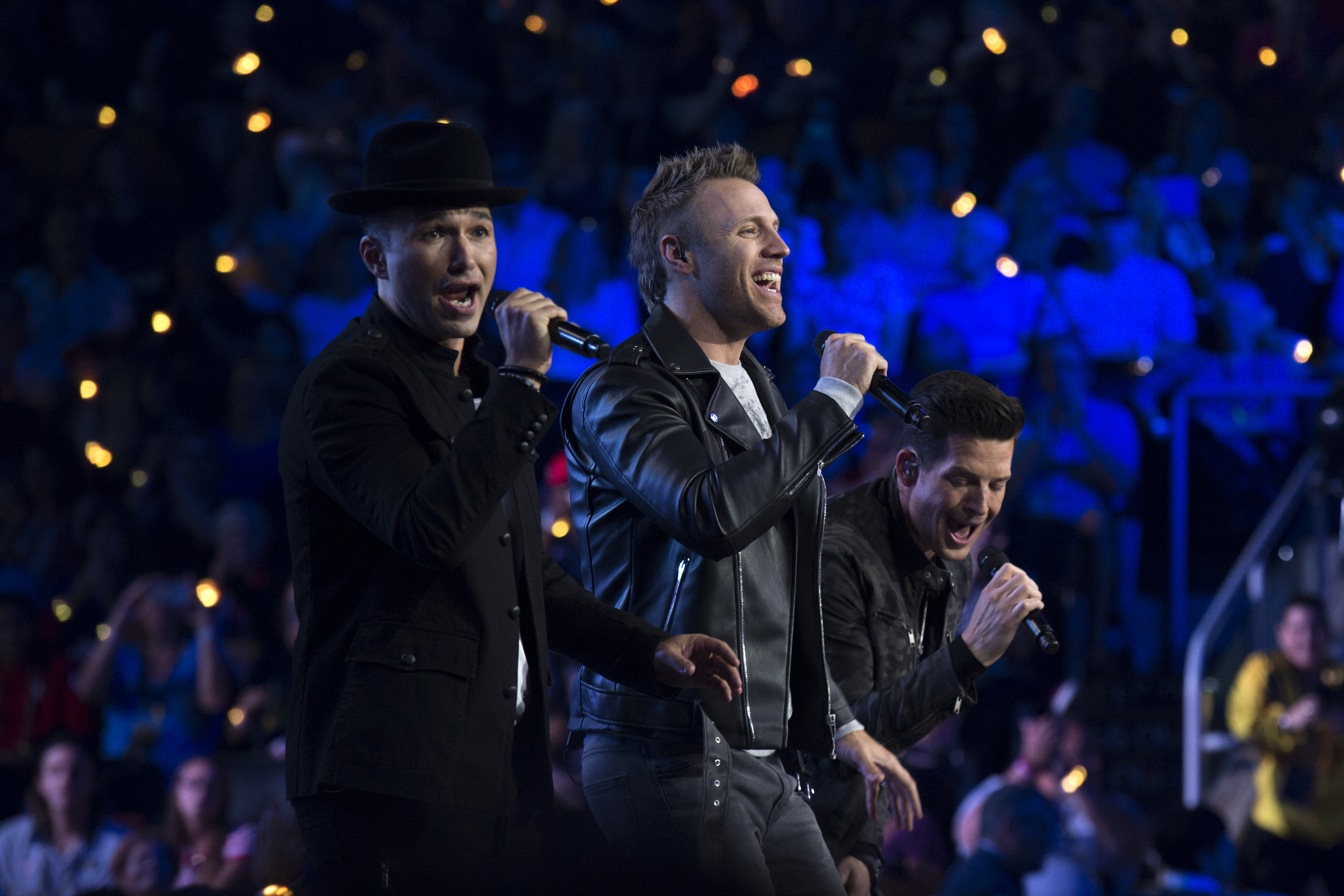
The Tenors performing for the 2017 Invictus Games opening ceremony at the Air Canada Centre in Toronto

The Tenors recorded their second PBS Special on March 12, 2015, at Caesars Windsor in Windsor, Ontario, featuring their new album, Under One Sky. The CD was released in Canada on May 4, 2015, and hit number one on iTunes within days. In the US, the release date was held back a month, to coincide with the June 2015 release of the PBS special to public television stations. Under One Sky features both original and re-recorded songs, and was well received at the PBS taping by a live, international audience. The PBS Special DVD was pre-released on May 13, 2015, for June 6 shipping.

An 18-date Under One Sky tour of Canada was announced in April 2015 to promote the new album.

==== MLB 2016 All-Star Game controversy ====
In July 2016, Remigio Pereira was removed from the group after he altered the lyrics to the Canadian national anthem at the 2016 Major League Baseball All-Star Game in San Diego—from "With glowing hearts we see thee rise, the True North strong and free," to "We're all brothers and sisters, all lives matter to the great", and held up a sign with the phrase.

==== 2019 NBA Finals ====
The Tenors became the first act to perform "O Canada" at an NBA Finals game, on May 30, 2019, at Scotiabank Arena in Toronto.

=== 2022 ===
Mark Masri and Italian singer Alberto Urso joined the group after Fraser Walters' departure.

=== 2024 ===
In September 2024, they performed the American and Canadian national anthems with pop singer Rêve during the 2024 Presidents Cup opening ceremony. Eduardo Aguirre joined the group.

=== 2025 ===
In March 2025, they performed at Muzika Muzika in Malta.

== Discography ==
=== Albums ===
Year	Album	Peak positions									Sales	Certifications (sales threshold)
Year	Album	CAN	CAN Class	NLD	US	US Album Sales	US Class	US Digital	US Christ	US Holiday	Sales	Certifications (sales threshold)
2005	The Canadian Tenors: Released: June 6, 2005; Label: Warner Music; Format: CD, digital download	—	—	—	—	—	—	—	—	—		
2008	The Canadian Tenors: Released: November 25, 2008; Label: Universal, Decca; Format: CD, digital download	22	2	15	49	—	1	24	2	—	US: 28,238	MC: 2× Platinum
2009	The Perfect Gift: Holiday album; Released: November 3, 2009; Label: Universal, Decca; Format: CD, digital download	—	3	—	200	—	1	—	—	7		MC: 3× Platinum
2012	Lead with Your Heart: Released: October 9, 2012; Label: Universal, Decca, Verve; Format: CD, digital download	3	—	—	21	—	1	—	—	—	US: 95,000	MC: Platinum
2015	Under One Sky: Released: May 4, 2015; Label: Universal; Format: CD, digital download	3	—	—	98	49	1	—	—	—	CAN: 5,700	
2017	Christmas Together: Released: October 13, 2017; Label: Universal; Format: CD, digital download	16	—	—	—	—	—	—	—	—		
"—" denotes the album did not chart.

=== Singles ===
==== As lead artist ====
Year	Single	Peak chart positions				Album
Year	Single	CAN	CAN Vocal	US Vocal	NL	Album
2008	"Hallelujah"	56	1	1	39	The Canadian Tenors
2008	"Silent Night"	—	—	—	—	The Perfect Gift
2012	"I Believe"	—	—	—	—	Lead with Your Heart
2013	"I Thank You (The Tenors)"	—	—	—	—	I Thank You
"—" denotes the single didn't chart.

==== As featured artist ====
Year	Single	Album
2021	"O Holy Night" (Tyler Shaw featuring The Tenors)	A Tyler Shaw Christmas
