= You're So Hollywood =

Single by Elise Estrada

from the album Here Kitty Kittee
- Released: July 9, 2010
- Genre: Pop, Pop rap
- Label: RockSTAR Music Corp./Universal Music
- Songwriter(s): Juan Orlando Calzado, Sean Hosein, Adam Hurstfield

Elise Estrada singles chronology
"One Last Time" (2009)	"You're So Hollywood" (2010)	"Lipstick" (2010)

"You're So Hollywood" is a song by the Canadian singer Elise Estrada. It peaked at number 98 on Canadian Hot 100.

== Charts ==
Chart (2010)	Peak position
Canada (Canadian Hot 100)	98
Canada CHR/Top 40 (Billboard)	30
