= Rabbit on My Wheel =

Studio album by Ridley Bent
- Released: June 15, 2010
- Genre: Country
- Length: 50:45
- Label: Open Road
- Producer: John MacArthur Ellis

Ridley Bent chronology
Buckles and Boots (2007)	Rabbit on My Wheel (2010)	Wildcard (2014)

Singles from Rabbit on My Wheel
- 1. "I Can't Turn My Back on the Bottle" Released: April 26, 2010; 2. "Love Car" Released: October 2010; 3. "All the Heat Is in the Whiskey" Released: December 6, 2010; 4. "Living with Her Ex" Released: February 14, 2011

Rabbit on My Wheel is the third studio album by Canadian country-rock artist Ridley Bent. It was released on June 15, 2010, by Open Road Recordings. Although Bent's debut album, Blam!, blended hip hop and country, singles from Rabbit on My Wheel received regular airplay on mainstream country radio stations.

Bent was originally planning to title the album Good Lookin' Country as a tribute to George Jones. It includes a cover of "She Thinks I Still Care," a song written by Dickey Lee and made famous by Jones in 1962.

Bent toured to support the album, opening for Emerson Drive on the Western leg of their Decade and Driving tour. The tour averaged crowds of 500 people per night.

== Critical reception ==
Rabbit on My Wheel received a positive review from Kerry Doole of Exclaim! Doole praised Bent's "robust, convincing vocal style" and concluded that the album is "a bright light on the oft-dull landscape of conventional Canadian country." Herohill also reviewed the album positively, writing that "Bent’s determination and appreciation of the past keep every note sounding authentic" and that "you aren't going to find a better collection of songs from any young artist in Canada."

== Track listing ==
No.	Title	Writer(s)	Length
1.	"Rabbit on My Wheel"	Ridley Bent, Chris Dunn	3:32
2.	"Good Lookin' Country"	Bent	3:32
3.	"Livin' with Her Ex"	Bent, Dunn	3:55
4.	"Yukon Belle"	Bent	4:05
5.	"Lonesome Town"	Bent, Rueben Degroot	4:31
6.	"I Can't Turn My Back on the Bottle"	Bent, Dunn	5:05
7.	"Love Car"	Bent, Dunn	4:41
8.	"Square Your Hat"	Bent, Cameron Latimer	3:41
9.	"Lovesick"	Bent	4:15
10.	"All the Heat Is in the Whiskey"	Bent	4:57
11.	"She Thinks I Still Care"	Dickey Lee	4:11
12.	"Burnin' Down Barns"	Bent	4:20
