= The Wheat Pool =

- Origin: Edmonton, Alberta, Canada
- Genres: Country rock
- Years active: 2004–2012
- Labels: Shameless Records Canada
- Members: Robb Angus (lead vocals, guitars, bass), Mike Angus (lead vocals, bass, guitars), Steph Dagenais (drums), Glen Erickson (lead guitar, vocals)
- Website: www.TheWheatPool.com

The Wheat Pool was a Canadian dark country rock band formed in 2004 in Edmonton. The band was on Shameless Records Canada. The band played their final show on March 23, 2012, at the Pawnshop.

== Discography ==
=== Albums ===
- Township (2007)
- Hauntario (2009)
- Behind The Stars EP (2010)
