= Here Kitty Kittee =

Studio album by Elise Estrada
- Released: November 9, 2010
- Recorded: 2009–2010
- Genre: Pop, contemporary R&B
- Length: 32:48
- Label: RockSTAR Music Corp./Universal Music

Elise Estrada chronology
Elise Estrada (2008)	Here Kitty Kittee (2010)	#ROUND3 (2014)

Singles from Here Kitty Kittee
- 1. "You're So Hollywood" Released: July 2010; 2. "Lipstick" Released: October 2010

Here Kitty Kittee is the second album by Canadian pop singer Elise Estrada. It was released on November 9, 2010.

== Track listing ==
No.	Title	Length
1.	"Whoa"	3:28
2.	"Acapella"	3:07
3.	"Broke"	3:08
4.	"You're So Hollywood"	3:17
5.	"Lipstick"	3:22
6.	"Yin Yang"	3:04
7.	"First Degree"	3:28
8.	"Heartless"	4:03
9.	"Y.O.Y"	2:55
10.	"That Somebody"	2:48

== Notes ==
- The release date of Estrada's second, November 9, 2010, was the same date as the release of Activision's Call of Duty: Black Ops.
- "First Degree" served as the theme song for Love Court.
