= I Believe (Nikki Yanofsky song) =

Single by Nikki Yanofsky

from the album I Believe / J'imagine - CTV's 2010 Winter Games Theme Song EP
- Released: January 26, 2010
- Recorded: 2010 in Montreal, Quebec
- Genre: Pop
- Length: 4:11 (EP version); 3:38 (Single version)
- Label: Universal Music Canada
- Songwriters: Stephan Moccio, Alan Frew
- Producers: Stephan Moccio, Phil Ramone, Jesse Harris

Nikki Yanofsky singles chronology
"I Got Rhythm" (2009)	"I Believe" (2010)	"Cool My Heels" (2010)

"I Believe" is a song sung by Canadian jazz-pop singer Nikki Yanofsky. Written by Stephan Moccio and Alan Frew for Canada's Olympic Broadcast Media Consortium, it was used as the official promotional song for both the 2010 Winter Olympics in Vancouver and the 2012 Summer Olympics in London. It is also the official theme song for the former. Themes from this song appeared in the main title sequence music, and were used to create cues for use during actual Olympic coverage broadcasts. A French version of the song, "J'imagine" was recorded and sung by Annie Villeneuve.

== Background ==
Both the English and French versions were recorded in Montreal, Quebec, along with the help of The Montreal Symphony Orchestra and additional recordings in Toronto of the Bach Children’s Chorus supplying the backing vocals in both languages.

It was noted in the media that the lyric "I believe in the power of you and I" is grammatically incorrect.

This song is also available on Nikki's new album, Nikki, which received a gold certification from the Canadian Recording Industry Association in June, 2010.

== Reception ==
It reached number one on the Canadian Hot 100 issue dated February 27, 2010.

== Chart performance ==
Nikki Yanofsky

Chart (2010)	Peak position
Canada Hot 100 (Billboard)	1

=== Year-end charts ===
Chart (2010)	Peak position
Canada (Canadian Hot 100)	33

Annie Villeneuve

Chart (2010)	Peak position
Canada Hot 100 (Billboard)	36
