= The Mountains and the Trees =

Canadian folk rock band

- Origin: Pasadena, Newfoundland and Labrador, Canada
- Genres: Folk rock
- Years active: 2006–present
- Members: Jon Janes
- Website: rockandroots.com

The Mountains and the Trees is a Canadian folk rock band whose sole constant member is Jon Janes of Pasadena, Newfoundland and Labrador. The band is now based in St. John's. Canadian singer-songwriter Hayden is a significant musical influence. In addition to Hayden, the band's musical style has also been likened to that of Iron & Wine and Julie Doiron. Critical reception has been generally positive. Rachel Sanders of Exclaim! wrote, "[Janes'] thoroughly modern folk style combines traditional instrumentation with subtle but perfectly integrated effects."

The band released the EP Paper or Plastic in 2006. The album Document, released in 2007, was recorded at the First United Church in Corner Brook. The EP Hop, Skip, and a Jump was released in 2009.
