= Ridley Bent =

Canadian singer-songwriter

- Born: Brian Daniel Fowler; 1 January 1979 (age 47)
- Origin: Halifax, Nova Scotia, Canada
- Genres: Country, rock, hip hop
- Occupation: Singer-songwriter
- Years active: 2000–present
- Labels: MapleMusic Recordings; Open Road
- Website: www.ridleybent.ca

Ridley Bent is the stage name of Brian Daniel Fowler, a Canadian country singer-songwriter. Born in Halifax, Nova Scotia, Bent was raised throughout Canada in a military family. He formally launched his musical career in 2000 in British Columbia, including performances as an opening act for Great Big Sea and Sam Roberts.

His debut album, Blam!, was released on MapleMusic Recordings in 2005, and was marked by a style that incorporated country, rock and hip hop influences, in a manner similar to Buck 65. The album was produced by Chin Injeti, formerly of the R&B band Bass is Base. Described by Bent as "hick hop", the album was best known for the single "Suicidewinder".

His subsequent albums, 2007's Buckles and Boots and 2010's Rabbit on My Wheel, pursued a more conventional country sound.

In early 2009, Bent's song "Nine Inch Nails" won in the 8th Annual Independent Music Awards and Vox Pop vote for Best Country Song.

More recently he has toured and recorded with a new backing band, the Killer Tumbleweeds. His first album with that band, Ridley Bent and the Killer Tumbleweeds, was released in 2018.

== Discography ==
=== Albums ===
Title	Details
Blam!	Release date: 24 May 2005; Label: MapleMusic Recordings
Buckles and Boots	Release date: 27 November 2007; Label: Open Road Recordings
Rabbit on My Wheel	Release date: 15 June 2010; Label: Open Road Recordings
Wildcard	Release date: 29 April 2014; Label: Americana North
Ridley Bent and the Killer Tumbleweeds	Release date: 6 April 2018; Label: Americana North

=== Singles ===
Year	Single	Album
2005	"Suicidewinder"	Blam!
2008	"Heartland Heartbreak"	Buckles and Boots
2008	"Buckles and Boots"	Buckles and Boots
2009	"Arlington"	Buckles and Boots
2010	"I Can't Turn My Back on the Bottle"	Rabbit on My Wheel
2010	"Love Car"	Rabbit on My Wheel
2010	"All the Heat Is in the Whiskey"	Rabbit on My Wheel
2011	"Living with Her Ex"	Rabbit on My Wheel
2014	"The Most Beautiful Woman Around"	Wildcard
2014	"You Got Lucky"	Wildcard

=== Music videos ===
Year	Video	Director
2009	"Arlington"	Christopher Mills

== Awards and nominations ==
Year	Association	Category	Result	Ref
2008	Canadian Country Music Association	Roots Artist or Group of the Year	Nominated	
2008	Canadian Country Music Association	Top New Talent of the Year – Male	Nominated	
2009	Canadian Country Music Association	Roots Artist or Group of the Year	Nominated	
2010	Canadian Country Music Association	Roots Artist or Group of the Year	Nominated	
2011	Canadian Country Music Association	Roots Artist or Group of the Year	Nominated	
2012	Canadian Country Music Association	Roots Artist or Group of the Year	Nominated	
