= Wool on Wolves =

Canadian folk-rock band

- Origin: Edmonton, Alberta, Canada
- Genres: indie-rock folk-rock
- Years active: 2008–present
- Label: Unsigned
- Members: Thomas Reikie; Eric Leydon; Gordon Brasnett; Brody Irvine; Kevin George

Wool on Wolves is a Canadian folk-rock band based in Edmonton, Alberta. The band formed in October 2008 while attending the University of Alberta.

Wool on Wolves debut EP Hate is Poor was self-released in April 2010, followed by their début album Grey Matter on November 9, 2010. Measures of Progress, the band's sophomore LP, was released on November 13, 2012.

Wool on Wolves was named Best Folk/Roots and Best Group at the 2011 Edmonton Music Awards. Grey Matter was nominated for a 2011 Western Canadian Music Award in the Best Rock category.

The band announced their performance on Friday, September 26, 2014, would likely be their last.

== Members ==
As a group of multi-instrumentalists, Wool on Wolves is known to frequently switch instruments for both live and recorded performances.

- Thomas Reikie - lead vocals, guitar, harmonica, banjo, lap steel
- Eric Leydon - piano, drums, percussion, trumpet, guitar, vocals
- Gordon Brasnett - guitar, bass, piano, lap steel, vocals
- Brody Irvine - bass, guitar, vocals, violin, cello, piano
- Kevin George - drums, banjo, vocals, glockenspiel

== Discography ==
- Hate Is Poor EP (April, 2010)
- Grey Matter (November, 2010)
- Measures of Progress (November 13, 2012)
