= Olenka and the Autumn Lovers =

Canadian indie folk band

- Origin: Vancouver, British Columbia, Canada
- Genres: Indie folk
- Labels: Independent
- Members: Olenka Krakus, Jeff Moon, Dan Toews
- Website: olenkalovers.com

Olenka and the Autumn Lovers are a Canadian indie folk band from Vancouver, British Columbia. Fronted by Polish-born singer-songwriter Olenka Krakus, the band's sound is a mix of orchestral folk-pop with elements reminiscent of classic country and folk music, and Eastern European folk. The band uses diverse instruments (including cello, violin, accordion, trumpet, saxophone, clarinet, lap steel, pedal steel, and mandolin) to showcase Krakus' songwriting.

== History ==
Olenka and the Autumn Lovers was formed by Krakus in early 2008 in London, Ontario, and named after her favourite season. Krakus collected a long list of musicians based in the London, Ontario and Vancouver, British Columbia scenes.

The band released a self-titled album in 2008, which was named Local Album of the Year by the University of Western Ontario's campus radio station CHRW-FM. That year they also released two EPs, the country-influenced Papillonette and the sombre Warsaw Girl.

In the summer of 2010, the band recorded their second album, And Now We Sing, which was released in October 2010. The album was recorded by Andy Magoffin at The House of Miracles, with additional recordings by Simon Larochette at The London Music Club. It was mixed by Andy Magoffin and Simon Larochette, and mastered by Joao Carvalho at JCM. The album appeared on the !Earshot National Top 50 Chart in October. The band toured in eastern Canada in support of the album, and in 2011 continued touring in western Canada, performing at several festivals. Later that year they were back in Ontario and then the east coast, performing at the Halifax Pop Explosion and Rifflandia.

The band recorded a batch of songs in the summer of 2012 with Simon Larochette at his studio The Sugar Shack (former home of Andy Magoffin's House of Miracles). The songs were mixed and mastered by Dan Weston.

Seven songs from the summer recording sessions were released on an EP, Hard Times, in 2012. The band received extensive college radio play across Canada, and were featured on the national CBC Radio programs Radio 2 Drive, Q (including a live, in-studio performance), The Vinyl Cafe and various provincial programs.

The remaining three songs were released digitally in October 2012 and released on vinyl on the It's Alright 7-inch in May 2013.

In 2014, Krakus left London and moved to Vancouver. The Autumn Lovers continued to perform, now based on the west coast; a 2015 tour in western Canada included London's Home County Folk Festival.

Olenka and the Autumn Lovers have also performed at NXNE (North by Northeast), Pop Montreal, CMW (Canadian Music Week), Stereophonic, In The Dead Of Winter, [(2015), and LOLA (The London Ontario Live Arts Festival).

== Current band members ==
- Olenka Krakus - lead vocal, classical guitar
- Jeffrey Moon - drums, electric guitar
- Dan Toews - bass

== Selected discography ==
=== Albums ===
- May 2008: Warsaw Girl EP (independent)
- November 2008: Olenka and the Autumn Lovers (self-titled, independent)
- November 2008: Papillonette EP (independent)
- October 2010: And Now We Sing (independent)
- October 2012: Hard Times EP (independent)
- October 2012 / 2013: It's Alright seven-inch vinyl record (independent)

=== Contributions ===
- March 2009: OH! Compilation One (Open House Arts Collective, compilation) song -"The Decline"
- November 2010: OH! Compilation Two (Open House Arts Collective, compilation) song -"Sparrow"
- December 2011: Folks Songs of Canada Now (compilation) song - "The Murder of Maggie Howie"
