= Elise Estrada =

Filipino-Canadian pop singer-songwriter

- Born: July 30, 1987 (age 39); Marikina, Philippines
- Origin: Surrey, British Columbia
- Genres: R&B, pop
- Occupations: Singer, songwriter
- Years active: 1999–present
- Labels: XOXO Entertainment Corp. Universal Music Canada; VIVA Records
- Partner: Adam Hurstfield (2009–present)

Elise Estrada (born July 30, 1987) is a Filipino-Canadian pop singer-songwriter. She is known for her hit singles such as "Insatiable", "One Last Time" and "Lipstick" which were released in Canada.

She is signed to Universal Music Canada's XOXO Entertainment.

== Early life and career beginnings ==
Elise Estrada was born in the Philippines and moved to Canada when she was four. She has a younger sister, Emmalyn Estrada and two brothers, Ervin and Eric.

While growing up in Surrey, British Columbia, she attended Holy Cross Regional High School and participated in many pageant and singing competitions. At age 17, Estrada won the title of "Miss Vancouver Princess" and later became the first runner-up in the Binibining Pilipinas World of Canada Competition.

== Career ==
In 2006, Estrada was a finalist in the Philippine television vocal competition, Pinoy Pop Superstar. In 2007, she won the 2007 Beat Music Awards and earned a record and management contract with RockSTAR Music Corporation. Her debut single, "Insatiable", was released in May 2007 and went to No. 1 on the Canadian Top 40 Charts. In 2008 and 2009 and also in July 2011, Estrada performed at the Canada Day Festival in Surrey, B.C.

In August 2009, Estrada's hosted all 21 episodes of originally produced television series, Love Court which debuted in August 2009 on MuchMusic which featured her song "First Degree" as its theme, before it was cancelled in February 2010, with reruns later broadcast on MuchMoreMusic.

Estrada has toured with George, Girlicious, Soulja Boy Tell 'Em, Rihanna, Lady Gaga, Backstreet Boys, 50 Cent, Nelly, and Sean Kingston.

Estrada appeared in a Sony Films movie with David Hasselhoff and Lucas Grabeel (High School Musical, Milk).

Estrada's originally produced program My Date with...Elise Estrada in Thailand aired on MuchMusic on September 8, 2010.

Here Kitty Kittee, Estrada's second album was scheduled to be released on November 9, 2010, on iTunes Canada according to her Entertainment Tonight Canada interview. The album's first single "You're So Hollywood" was released on July 9, 2010, and the music video was premiered at Muchmusic New Music Videos on September 23, 2010. Her second single, "Lipstick", previewed on her Myspace page. The music video for the song was filmed in London and was finalized and premiered on Estrada's Vevo Channel on December 1, 2010. Estrada starred and sang as a guest on CW Network's Hellcats episode "God Must Have My Fortune Laid Away" on February 15, 2011. She sang a new song called "I Be That".

Estrada began working on her third studio album titled #Round 3 in 2012. On October 2, 2012, the single "Piece of Me", a dance-pop/bubblegum pop track, was released. It was followed by a single on October 23 titled "Wonder Woman", which was dedicated to Amanda Todd who committed suicide from cyber-bullying. On January 7, 2014, she released the album's lead single, "U Don't Need 2 Know". Its music video premiered on VEVO on the same day. #Round 3 was eventually released on July 29, 2014. She also signed a record deal with VIVA Records to release the album in Asia and handle her promotions in the Philippines during her concert tours from August to September.

== Personal life ==
In December 2019, Estrada got engaged to her boyfriend of ten years, Adam Hurstfield. Hurstfield has a son from a previous relationship. Estrada announced that she was pregnant with their child in 2020. In March 2021, the couple welcomed a daughter.

== Discography ==
=== Studio albums ===
List of albums, with selected chart positions
Title	Album details
Elise Estrada	Released: September 16, 2008; Label: RockSTAR, Universal Canada; Format: CD, digital download
Here Kitty Kittee	Released: November 9, 2010; Label: RockSTAR, Universal Canada; Format: CD, digital download
#ROUND3	Released: July 29, 2014; Label: XOXO, Universal Canada, Viva; Format: CD, digital download

=== EPs ===
List of albums, with selected chart positions
Title	Album details
Elise Estrada	Released: April 15, 2004.; Label: RockSTAR, Universal Canada; Format: CD, digital download

=== Singles ===
Year	Single	Peak positions				Album
Year	Single	CAN	CAN AC	CAN CHR	CAN HAC	Album
2007	"Insatiable"	44	—	6	38	Elise Estrada
2007	"Ix Nay"	—	—	36	—	Elise Estrada
2007	"Unlove You"	11	—	5	12	Elise Estrada
2008	"These Three Words"	91	—	17	44	Elise Estrada
2008	"Crash & Burn"	66	—	24	40	Elise Estrada
2009	"Poison"	61	—	30	36	Elise Estrada
2009	"One Last Time"	96	—	34	44	Elise Estrada
2010	"You're So Hollywood"	98	—	30	—	Here Kitty Kittee
2010	"Lipstick"	46	—	28	23	Here Kitty Kittee
2012	"Piece of Me"	—	—	—	—	#ROUND3
2012	"Wonder Woman"	—	21	—	—	#ROUND3
2014	"U Don't Need 2 Know"	—	—	—	—	#ROUND3
"—" denotes a recording that failed to chart or was not released to that format.

== Awards, nominations and achievements ==
=== Highlights ===
- Ten Top 10 Cancon singles & two No. 1 Cancon singles to date
- 2009 Juno Award nomination for Best R&B/Soul Recording of the Year
- Two 2009 Much Music Video Award nominations for Best Pop Video of the Year & Cinematographer of the Year
- Presenter at the 2009 Juno Awards on CTV
- Performance at the 2009 Juno Awards Gala
- Starring in the MuchMusic Television series "Love Court"

=== Wins and nominations ===
- Winner – BDS 20,000 Spins Award for "UnLove You" – November 2008
- Winner – "The Best New Artist or Group Award" at 'The 2008 Canadian Radio Music Awards' (nominated for 2 awards)
- Winner – "The Factor Emerging Artist Initiative"
- Winner – "The Chum emerging artist initiative" from one of Canada's largest radio conglomerates!
- Winner – The Beat 94.5 Radio Contest as the "2007 Artist of the Year" at ‘The Beat Music Awards’!
- Winner – The Canadian Finals for the American Idol like television series, "Pinoy Pop Superstar"… went on to the Philippine's to co-star in the television series for 3 months and gained Millions of Asian fans in Canada and Worldwide
- Nominated for "Best R&B/Soul Recording of the Year" at The 2009 Juno Awards (Canada's Grammy's)
- Nomination for two Much Music Video Awards 2009

=== Musical highlights ===
- Debut single "Insatiable" became the No. 1 Canadian single on both the BDS and MediaBase TOP 40 Charts for 4 weeks straight
- Hit the No. 1 Canadian Greatest Gainer @ Top 40 numerous times to date
- 3rd single, "UnLove You" hit No. 1 on The Top 40 Charts (making it her 2nd No. 1 single to date)

=== Tour highlights ===
- Headlined Juno Fanfare 2009 with Warner Music recording artist Divine Brown
- Direct tour support slot for Backstreet Boys
- Summer Tour ’08 with 50 Cent, G Unit, & Soulja Boy
- Direct tour support for Sean Kingston
- Co-Headlined Summer ’08 tour dates with Nelly, and guest performances by Jesse McCartney, Lady Gaga, Cascada, Girlicious, C&C Music Factory, and Snap!
- Opened for hit recording artists Summer ’07 tours including Rihanna and Enrique Iglesias

=== Sponsors ===
- Marketing & promotion sponsorship with Parasuco Clothing
- Marketing & promotion sponsorship with National clothing chain ‘Urban Planet’
- National promotion with Clarins Cosmetics & Access Magazine to launch their new Roxy Fragrance

=== Juno Awards ===
Year	Nominee / work	Award	Result
2009	Elise Estrada	R&B/Soul Recording of the Year	Nominated

=== Canadian Radio Music Awards ===
Year	Nominee / work	Award	Result
2008	Elise Estrada	Best New Artist or Group – Pop/Rock	Nominated
2008	Elise Estrada	Best New Artist or Group – Rhythmic/Urban/R&B/Dance	Won
