= Grey Matter (album) =

Studio album by Wool on Wolves
- Released: November 9, 2010
- Genre: Indie rock, folk rock
- Label: Self-Released
- Producer: Nik Kozub

Wool on Wolves chronology
Hate is Poor EP	Grey Matter

Grey Matter is the début full-length album from Canadian indie-rock band Wool on Wolves. It was self-released on November 9, 2010 and produced by Nik Kozub of Shout Out Out Out Out.

== Track listing ==
1. Thick as Thieves
2. Ain't Seen Mississippi
3. G-Arp
4. Honeybee
5. The Distance Between Us
6. Ports of Glass Harbour
7. Bird in the Bush
8. Red Roses
9. One Second
10. Cocaine and Bellows
11. Reap and Sow

== Reception ==
Grey Matter was positively received, with Wool on Wolves drawing comparisons to The Band, Ryan Adams, and early Wilco. Grey Matter was nominated for a 2011 Western Canadian Music Award in the Best Rock category, and named the 7th best album of 2010 by Edmonton Journal writer Sandra Sperounes.
