= Nikki Yanofsky =

Canadian singer (born 1994)

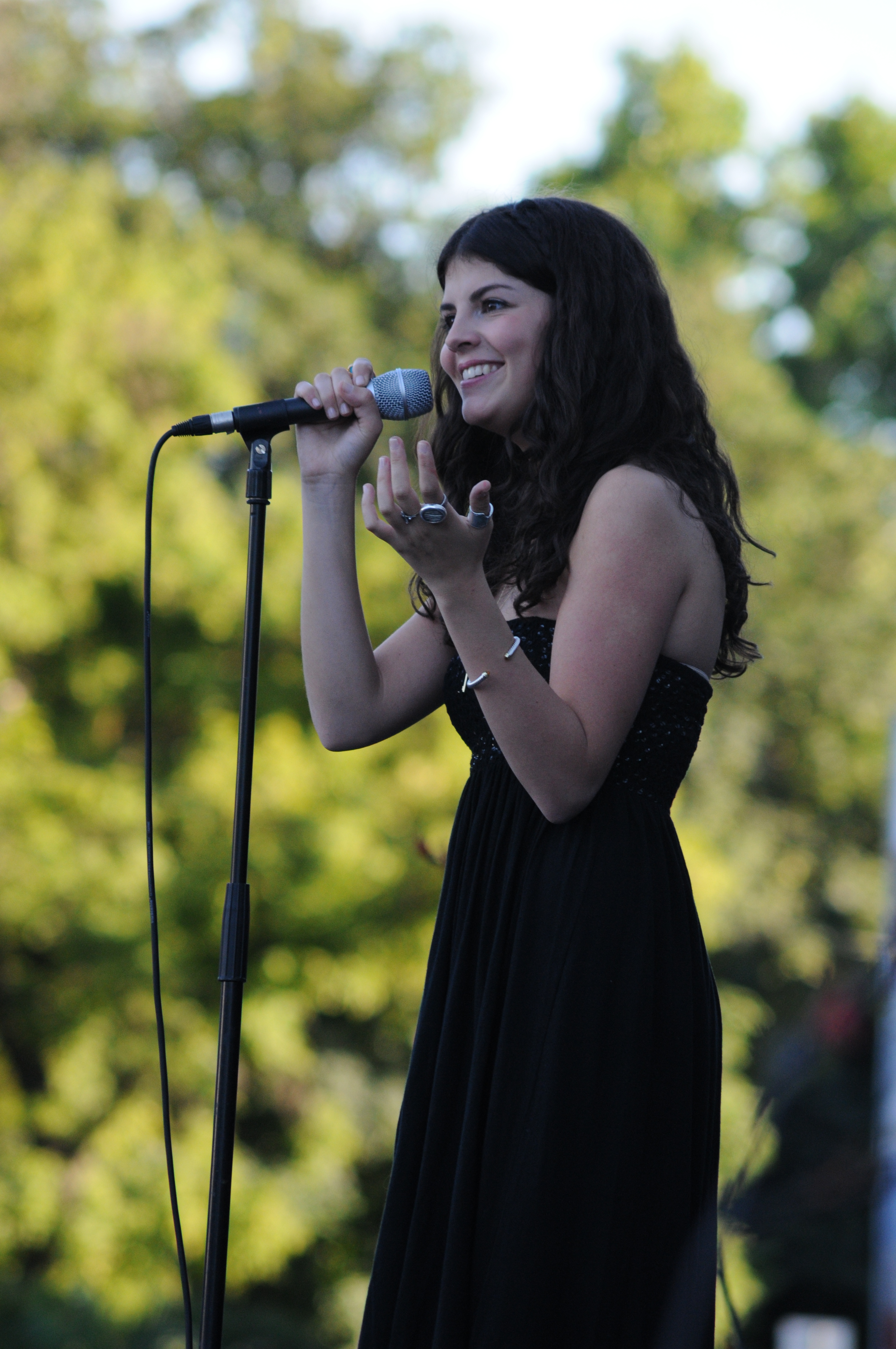
- Yanofsky performing in Vienna in 2010

Background information
- Born: Nicole Rachel Yanofsky; February 8, 1994 (age 32); Montreal, Quebec, Canada
- Genres: Jazz; pop
- Occupation: Singer-songwriter
- Instrument: Vocals
- Years active: 2006–present
- Labels: A440 Entertainment; Universal Music Canada
- Website: nikkiyanofsky.com

Nicole Rachel Yanofsky (born February 8, 1994) is a Canadian singer and songwriter from Montreal, Quebec. She sang the CTV Olympic broadcast theme song, "I Believe", which was also the theme song of the 2010 Winter Olympic Games hosted by Vancouver. She also performed at the opening and closing ceremonies for the Olympics and at the opening ceremony of the 2010 Winter Paralympic Games. She has released four studio albums to date, including Nikki in 2010, Little Secret in 2014, Turn Down the Sound in 2020, and Nikki By Starlight in 2022.

== Early life ==
Yanofsky was born and raised in a "close-knit Jewish family" in Montreal, Quebec, Canada. Her parents are Elyssa (née Rosenthal) and Richard Yanofsky. She has two older brothers, Michael and Andrew.

Yanofsky graduated from St. George's School of Montreal, an independent elementary and high school.

== Recordings ==
Yanofsky recorded the Ella Fitzgerald song "Air Mail Special" for Verve Records and it was released in June 2007 on the album We All Love Ella: Celebrating the First Lady of Song. Produced by Tommy LiPuma, this track made Yanofsky the youngest singer to record for Verve. She then recorded "Gotta Go My Own Way" in English and French for the movie High School Musical 2.

In September 2008, Yanofsky released her first full-length album, a live CD/DVD concert package entitled Ella...Of Thee I Swing. She earned two Juno Award nominations in 2009: New Artist of the Year and Vocal Jazz Album of the Year. She also won Favourite Jazz Artist at the 2009 Canadian Independent Music Awards.

Songwriters Stephan Moccio and Alan Frew chose Yanofsky to sing CTV's broadcast theme for the 2010 Winter Olympics, "I Believe" which is also the official theme of the 2010 Winter Olympics, which reached number one on the Canadian Hot 100 on the week of February 27, 2010. This made her the first Canadian artist to have a number one song on that chart. The song was certified "Quadruple Platinum" for digital downloads in April 2010.

In 2010, Yanofsky recorded her first studio album, Nikki, with Phil Ramone. Along with the album-release of "I Believe", it included some of Yanofsky's first original works, collaborating with Jesse Harris, Ron Sexsmith and Feist. Nikki was released in April 2010 by Decca Records and was supported by an international tour. It earned a Juno nomination for "Vocal Jazz Album of the Year" and won Yanofsky the WAVE Smooth Jazz Award for "Female Vocalist of the Year".

For Ganz's October 2010 Webkinz Pet of the Month song, Yanofsky recorded a version of the Webkinz World song "I Dream in Pink".

Also in 2010, Yanofsky recorded a live concert at the Mercure Theatre in Montreal. The concert, titled Live in Montreal, was broadcast as a TV special on KPBS on June 15, and released on DVD the same month.

A 2011 jazz recording of popular Disney songs entitled Everybody Wants to Be a Cat: Disney Jazz, Volume 1 included a version of the song "It's a Small World" sung by Yanofsky. Other jazz artists on the album included Esperanza Spalding, Roy Hargrove, Dave Brubeck, Joshua Redman, and Alfredo Rodriguez.

Yanofsky's second studio album, Little Secret, was released in Canada in May 2014. The album was executive produced by Quincy Jones.

She collaborated with Herbie Hancock and will.i.am on a crossover version of the swing era hit "Stompin' at the Savoy". It was released on Kareem Abdul-Jabbar's audio book, On the Shoulders of Giants.

In 2015 Yanofsky began collaborating with Wyclef Jean on her new album and EP. Her Solid Gold EP was released in Canada on September 30, 2016.

In August 2018, Nikki Yanofsky started teasing on her Instagram for an upcoming music video. Nikki Yanofsky has worked with Herbie Hancock, Will.i.am, Elton John and now working with her favourite artist and mentor Quincy Jones. "Big Mouth" was released on September 14, 2018.

On July 10, 2020, Yanofsky released her third studio album Turn Down the Sound. Her fourth studio album, Nikki By Starlight, was released on October 21, 2022.

== Stage ==
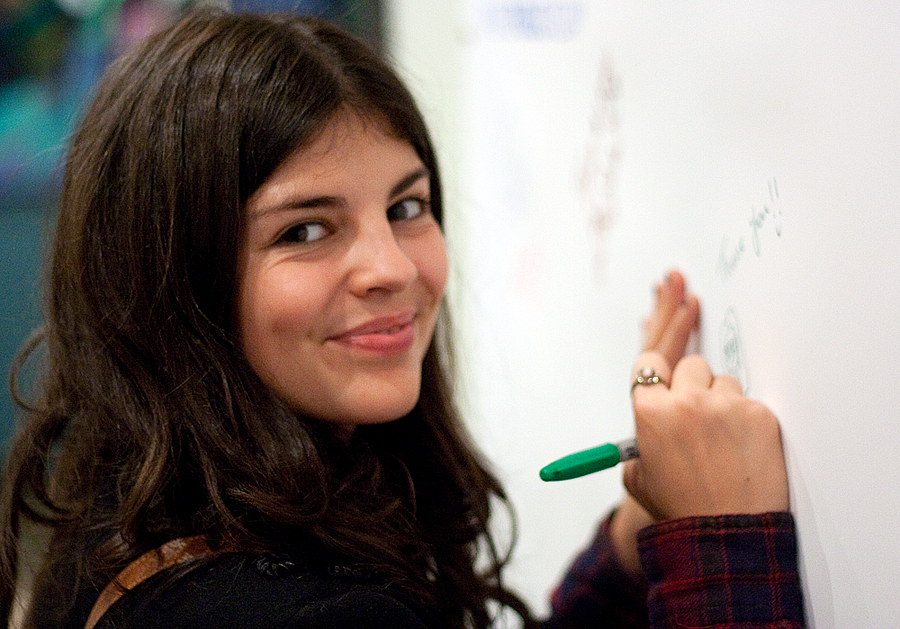
Yanofsky autographing a wall at KPLU-FM in October 2010

Yanofsky began her professional singing career by performing at the 2006 Montreal International Jazz Festival. Only 12 at the time, this performance made her the youngest performer ever to headline at the festival. She has returned each year since, including a special outdoor performance for the festival's 30th Anniversary in 2009 and a performance with l'Orchestre Métropolitain in 2011. Her other Canadian festival performances include Toronto (Luminato and Downtown), Ottawa (Jazz and Blues), Vancouver, Victoria, Quebec, Edmonton, Saskatoon, and Fredericton. Her international festival appearances include two visits to The Jamaica Jazz and Blues Festival, several European festivals including the North Sea Jazz Festival and the Montreux Jazz Festival as well as the Ginza International Jazz Festival in Japan at Kabuki-za.

On February 8, 2008, Yanofsky's 14th birthday, she kicked off a multi-city tour with Marvin Hamlisch at Carnegie Hall. In November 2008, she made her Canadian orchestral debut with the Edmonton Symphony Orchestra, and has gone on to sing with the Vancouver Symphony, the Edmonton Symphony and the Calgary Philharmonic.

With Herbie Hancock on piano, Yanofsky sang "On A Clear Day You Can See Forever" at the 2011 MusiCares Person of the Year awards honouring Barbra Streisand.

On April 13, 2013, Yanofsky and Stevie Wonder sang "Let the Good Times Roll" at the MGM Grand Garden Arena in Las Vegas. The event honoured the joint 80th birthday celebration of Quincy Jones and Sir Michael Caine.

The Little Secret Tour began on June 21, 2013, promoting Yanofsky's album, Little Secret.

== Charitable works ==
In 2008, Yanofsky received the Outstanding Youth in Philanthropy award from the Quebec Chapter of The Association of Fundraising Professionals. In the course of her career, she has helped raise over $10 million for local, national and international charities. She is currently associated with The Montreal Children's Hospital, The Children's Wish Foundation, and MusiCounts. She has also lent her voice to oneXone, Leave Out Violence Everywhere (L.O.V.E.), and ORT.

Yanofsky sang a solo part in the remake of K'naan's song "Wavin' Flag" performed by Young Artists for Haiti. This song was certified platinum for digital downloads in April 2010, and all of the proceeds from the single went to charities.

In October 2010, Yanofsky was awarded the first ever Allan Slaight Award by Canada's Walk of Fame. This award is presented annually to a young Canadian who is making a positive impact in the fields of music, film, literature, visual or performing arts, sports, innovation or philanthropy.

== Discography ==
=== Albums ===
Year	Details	Peak chart positions							Certifications (sales threshold)
Year	Details	CAN	CAN Jazz	BEL (Wa)	FRA	US	US Heat	US Jazz	Certifications (sales threshold)
2008	Ella...Of Thee I Swing: Released: September 23, 2008; Label: A440; Format: CD, digital download	—	8	—	—	—	—	—	
2010	Nikki: Released: CA: April 20, 2010 US: May 4, 2010 UK: May 8, 2011; Label: A440/Decca; Format: CD, digital download	5	1	—	29	105	1	3	MC: Platinum
2014	Little Secret: Released: CA: May 6, 2014 US: October 7, 2014; Label: A440/Decca; Format: CD, LP, digital download	4	—	132	28	—	—	13	MC: Gold
2020	Turn Down the Sound: Released: July 10, 2020; Label: eOne Music; Format: Digital download, streaming	77	—	—	—	—	—	—	
2022	Nikki by Starlight: Released: October 21, 2022; Label: MNRK; Format: CD, digital download, streaming	—	—	—	—	—	—	—	
"—" denotes releases that did not chart

=== EPs ===
- Solid Gold EP (September 2016)

=== Singles ===
Year	Title	Peak chart positions								Certifications	Album
Year	Title	CAN	CAN AC	CAN Hot AC	CAN DD	CAN Jazz	FRA	US Jazz	UK	Certifications	Album
2008	"Lullaby of Birdland"	—	—	—	23	—	—	—	—		Ella...Of Thee I Swing
2009	"I Got Rhythm"	—	—	—	—	3	—	9	—		Nikki
2010	"I Believe"	1	9	40	1	1	—	—	—	MC: 3× Platinum	Non-album single
2010	"Cool My Heels"	—	—	—	—	1	—	—	—		Nikki
2010	"Wavin' Flag" (Charity single)	1	—	—	1	—	—	—	89		Non-album single
2014	"Something New"	—	30	—	—	—	96	—	—		Little Secret
2014	"Necessary Evil"	52	11	23	—	—	—	—	—		Little Secret
2016	"Young Love"	—	—	—	—	—	—	—	—		Solid Gold
2016	"Miss You When I'm Drunk"	—	—	—	—	—	—	—	—		Solid Gold
2018	"Big Mouth"	— (Note: "Big Mouth" did not enter the Billboard Canada Hot 100, but peaked at number forty on the Canada AC chart, which acts as an extension to the Hot 100.)	40	—	—	—	—	—	—		Non-album singles
2018	"Mistletoe"	—	4	—	—	—	—	—	—		Non-album singles
2019	"Blowin' Smoke"	—	—	—	—	—	—	—	—		Non-album singles
2020	"Forget"	—	—	—	—	—	—	—	—		Turn Down the Sound
2020	"Nerve"	—	—	—	—	—	—	—	—		Turn Down the Sound
2020	"Loner"	—	—	—	—	—	—	—	—		Turn Down the Sound
2022	"Comes Love"	—	—	—	—	4	—	—	—		Nikki by Starlight
2022	"I Get a Kick Out of You"	—	—	—	—	—	—	—	—		Nikki by Starlight
2022	"Crazy He Calls Me" (featuring Greg Phillinganes)	—	—	—	—	—	—	—	—		Nikki by Starlight
2022	"Quiet Night of Stars (Corcovado)" (featuring Nathan East)	—	—	—	—	—	—	—	—		Nikki by Starlight
2022	"C'est Si Bon"	—	—	—	—	—	—	—	—		Nikki by Starlight
2022	"West Coast Blues" (featuring Greg Phillinganes)	—	—	—	—	—	—	—	—		Nikki by Starlight
"—" denotes releases that did not chart

== Videography ==
Year	Details	Certifications (sales threshold)
2010	Live in Montreal: Released: June 1, 2010; Label: A440/Decca; Format: DVD	MC: Platinum

== Awards and nominations ==
Year	Presenter	Award	Result
2009	Juno Awards	New Artist of the Year	Nominated
2009	Juno Awards	Vocal Jazz Album of the Year: Ella... of Thee I Swing	Nominated
2009	Canadian Independent Music Awards	Favourite Jazz Artist or Group	Won
2010	Félix Awards	English Album of the Year: Nikki	Nominated
2010	Félix Awards	Most Famous Quebec Artist Outside Quebec	Nominated
2010	Canada's Walk of Fame	Allan Slaight Award	Won
2011	Juno Awards	Vocal Jazz Album of the Year: Nikki	Nominated
2011	Canadian Radio Music Awards	Adult Contemporary Song of the Year: "I Believe"	Nominated
2011	WAVE Smooth Jazz Awards	Female Vocalist of the Year	Won
2011	WAVE Smooth Jazz Awards	Album of the Year: Nikki	Nominated
2011	WAVE Smooth Jazz Awards	Song of the Year: "Try, Try, Try"	Nominated
2015	Juno Awards	Pop Album of the Year: Little Secret	Nominated
