= Unlove You (Elise Estrada song) =

Single by Elise Estrada

from the album Elise Estrada
- Released: November 2007
- Recorded: 2007
- Genre: Pop, R&B
- Length: 3:12
- Label: RockSTAR Music Corp.
- Songwriter(s): Anthony George Anderson, Dane Deviller, Sean Hosein, Adam Hurstfield, Steven Smith

Elise Estrada singles chronology
"Ix Nay" (2007)	"Unlove You" (2007)	"These Three Words" (2008)

"Unlove You" is the second single by Canadian singer Elise Estrada from her self-titled debut album.

== Charts ==
"Unlove You" debuted at #94 on the Canadian Hot 100 on the issue of December 22 based on airplay, and since then it slowly rose up to the top fifty, but continuously dropped in position every week. After the song was released on iTunes for digital download, it moved from #41 to #11 on the issue of April 5, making it Estrada's first top twenty hit on the chart. The single is also her most successful one to date.

=== Weekly charts ===
Chart (2007–08)	Peak position
Canada (Canadian Hot 100)	11
Canada CHR/Top 40 (Billboard)	5
Canada Hot AC (Billboard)	12

=== Year-end charts ===
Chart (2008)	Position
Canada (Canadian Hot 100)	92
