= Nikki (album) =

Studio album by Nikki Yanofsky
- Released: May 4, 2010
- Length: 46:51
- Label: Decca
- Producer: Phil Ramone; Jesse Harris

Nikki Yanofsky chronology
Ella...Of Thee I Swing (2008)	Nikki (2010)	Little Secret (2014)

Singles from Nikki
- 1. "I Got Rhythm" Released: December 15, 2009; 2. "Cool My Heels" Released: April 6, 2010; 3. "For Another Day" Released: May 28, 2010; 4. "Bienvenue dans ma vie" Released: September 19, 2010

Nikki is the second studio album by the Canadian singer Nikki Yanofsky, released on May 4, 2010. Four singles were released from the record.

== Track listing ==
No.	Title	Length
1.	"Take the "A" Train"	3:34
2.	"Never Make It on Time"	2:28
3.	"I Got Rhythm"	3:45
4.	"For Another Day"	2:52
5.	"God Bless the Child"	5:06
6.	"Cool My Heels"	3:23
7.	"You'll Have to Swing It (Mr. Paganini)"	4:18
8.	"Bienvenue dans ma vie"	3:50
9.	"First Lady"	3:06
10.	"On the Sunny Side of the Street/Fool in the Rain"	2:40
11.	"Grey Skies"	3:22
12.	"Try Try Try"	3:11
13.	"Over the Rainbow"	5:09

== Chart performance ==
=== Album ===
Chart (2010–11)	Peak position
Canadian Albums (Billboard)	5
US Billboard 200	105
US Top Jazz Albums (Billboard)	2

=== Singles ===
Single	Chart	Peak position
"For Another Day"	Japan Hot 100	13
