= K'naan discography =

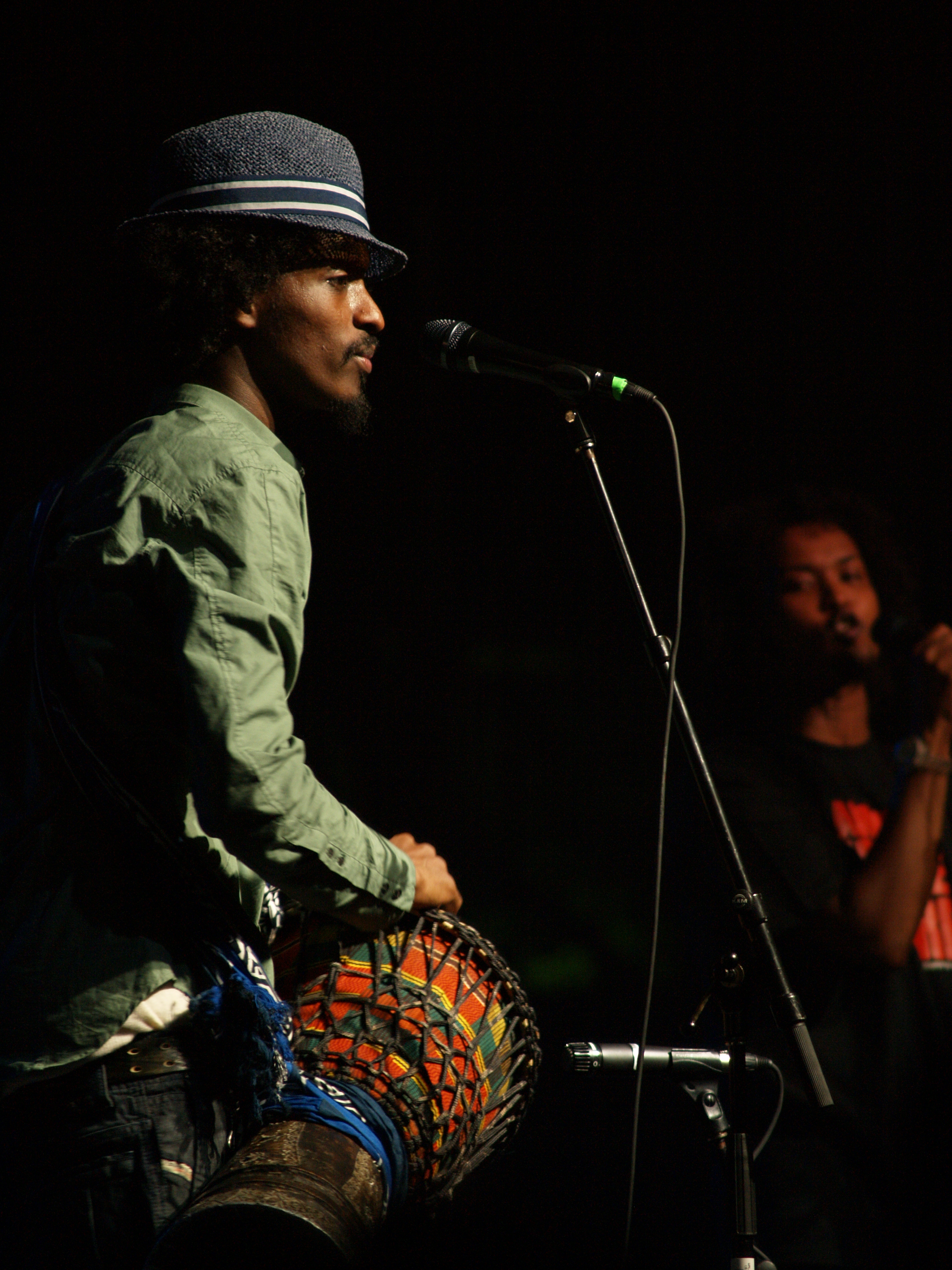
- Studio albums: 5
- Extended plays: 1
- Live albums: 1
- Singles: 22
- Mixtapes: 4
- Other appearances: 1

The discography of K'naan, a Somali Canadian rapper and singer, consists of five studio albums, one live album, one extended play and 22 singles (including eight as a featured performer and seven promotional releases).

== Albums ==
=== Studio albums ===
Album title	Album details	Peak chart positions								
Album title	Album details	CAN	AUT	FRA	MEX	SWI	UK	US	US R&B/HH	US Rap
What Next? (as Keinaan)	Released: 2000; Label: Cuffnone Music	—	—	—	—	—	—	—	—	—
My Life Is a Movie	Released: 2004; Label: Self-released	—	—	—	—	—	—	—	—	—
The Dusty Foot Philosopher	Released: June 7, 2005; Label: BMG	—	—	—	—	—	—	—	—	—
Troubadour	Released: February 24, 2009; Label: A&M/Octone	7	15	163	67	9	147	32	33	12
Country, God or the Girl	Released: October 3, 2012; Label: A&M/Octone	—	—	—	—	—	—	129	—	13
"—" denotes releases that did not chart.

=== Live albums ===
Album title	Album details
The Dusty Foot on the Road	Released: July 17, 2007; Label: EMI / Virgin
iTunes Live from Montreal	Released: January 1, 2010; Label: Interscope Records

=== Mixtapes ===
- K'naan : You Can't Buy This (Mixed By K-Salaam & Beatnick)
- K'naan & J.Period: The Messengers 1 (Fela Kuti)
- K'naan & J.Period: The Messengers 2 (Bob Marley)
- K'naan & J.Period: The Messengers 3 (Bob Dylan)

== Extended plays ==
Title	Details	Peak chart positions		
Title	Details	CAN	US R&B/HH	US Rap
More Beautiful Than Silence	Released: January 24, 2012; Label: A&M/Octone	37	32	19

== Singles ==
=== As lead artist ===
Year	Title	Peak chart positions										Certifications	Album
Year	Title	CAN	AUT	GER	IRL	ITA	NLD	NZ	SWI	UK	US	Certifications	Album
2008	"ABCs" (featuring Chubb Rock)	75	—	—	—	—	—	—	—	—	—		Troubadour
2009	"Wavin' Flag"	2	—	—	—	—	—	—	—	—	99		Troubadour
2010	"Wavin' Flag (Celebration Mix)"	—	1	1	2	2	2	—	1	2	82	MC: 3× Platinum; BPI: Platinum; FIMI: Gold; IFPI: Platinum	Troubadour
2010	"Take a Minute"	11	—	—	—	—	—	—	—	—	—		Troubadour
2010	"Bang Bang" (featuring Adam Levine)	71	—	—	—	—	—	—	—	105	—		Troubadour
2012	"Is Anybody Out There?" (featuring Nelly Furtado)	14	7	11	—	—	15	1	20	—	92	MC: Platinum; RMNZ: Gold	More Beautiful Than Silence
2012	"Nothing to Lose" (with Nas or with Nas and will.i.am)	—	—	—	—	—	—	—	—	—	—		Country, God or the Girl
2012	"Hurt Me Tomorrow"	12	—	—	—	—	—	16	—	—	—	MC: Platinum	Country, God or the Girl
2023	"Refugee"	—	—	—	—	—	—	—	—	—	—		Non-album single
"—" denotes releases that did not chart.

=== As featured artist ===
Year	Song	Peak chart positions				Certifications (sales thresholds)	Album
Year	Song	CAN	AUS	NLD	UK	Certifications (sales thresholds)	Album
2006	"Til We Get There" (M-1 featuring K'naan)	—	—	—	—		Confidential
2008	"Africa" (Amadou & Mariam featuring K'naan)	—	—	—	—		Welcome to Mali
2009	"L'Arme de Paix" (Oxmo Puccino featuring K'naan)	—	—	—	—		L'Arme de Paix
2009	"Think of All the Things" (KRS-One & Buckshot featuring K'naan)	—	—	—	—		Survival Skills
2009	"TV in the Radio" (Wale featuring K'naan)	—	—	—	—		Attention Deficit
2010	"In Jamaica" (Beatnick & K-Salaam featuring K'naan and Buckshot)	—	—	—	—		Beatnick & K-Salaam Present - Where The Streets Have No Name
2010	"Wavin' Flag" (with Young Artists for Haiti)	1	—	—	89		Non-album single
2010	"Stop for a Minute" (Keane featuring K'naan)	—	—	35	40		Night Train
2010	"Looking Back" (Keane featuring K'naan)	—	—	—	—		Night Train
2010	"Tribes at War" / "Africa Must Wake Up" (Nas and Damian Marley featuring K'naan)	—	—	—	—		Distant Relatives
2010	"Tamatant Tilay / Exodus" (Herbie Hancock, Tinariwen, K'naan and Los Lobos)	—	—	—	—		The Imagine Project
2011	"Hip Hop Nation" (KRS-One featuring K'naan, Lina and Frank Fitzpatrick)	—	—	—	—		Beat the World (Original Motion Picture Soundtrack)
2011	"Summer Paradise" (Simple Plan featuring K'naan)	8	4	7	12	ARIA: 2× Platinum; MC: 3× Platinum	Get Your Heart On!
2012	"Mecca" (Howard Shore, Metric and K'naan)	—	—	—	—		Cosmopolis: Original Motion Picture Soundtrack
2012	"We OK" (The Very Best featuring K'naan)	—	—	—	—		MTMTMK
2013	"Earth From Outer Space" (Michael Franti & Spearhead featuring K'naan)	—	—	—	—		All People
2016	"Give It up Today (If We Ruled the World)" (Tara MaQ featuring K'naan, Tink and Yasiin Bey)	—	—	—	—		Chi-Star
2021	"Waayo Waayo" (Sharma Boy featuring K'naan)	—	—	—	—		—N/a
2021	"Somalia Somali Baa Leh" (Sharma Boy featuring K'naan)	—	—	—	—		—N/a
"—" denotes releases that did not chart.

=== Promotional singles ===
Year	Song	Album
2005	"Soobax"	The Dusty Foot Philosopher
2005	"Strugglin'"	The Dusty Foot Philosopher
2008	"Dreamer"	Troubadour
2008	"Somalia"	Troubadour
2009	"I Come Prepared" (featuring Damian Marley)	Troubadour
2009	"If Rap Gets Jealous" (featuring Kirk Hammett)	Troubadour
2016	"Immigrants (We Get the Job Done)" (with Snow tha Product, Riz MC and Resīdεntә)	The Hamilton Mixtape

== Other appearances ==
Title	Year	Other Artist(s)	Album	Ref.
"World Cry"	2011	Lloyd, R.Kelly, Keri Hilson	King of Hearts	
"With God On Our Side"	2012	—N/a	Chimes of Freedom	
"Immigrants (We Get the Job Done)"	2016	Snow tha Product, Riz MC, Resīdεntә	The Hamilton Mixtape	
"Belly Full" (J.PERIOD Remix)	2020	J.PERIOD, Kardinal Offishall, Steele, Bajah	BEST OF J.PERIOD [VOL.2]	
