= Governor Brown =

Governor Brown or Browne may refer to:

- Aaron V. Brown (1795–1859), 11th Governor of Tennessee
- Albert G. Brown (1813–1880), 14th Governor of Mississippi
- Albert O. Brown (1852–1937), 58th Governor of New Hampshire
- Alfred Winsor Brown (1885–1938), 31st Naval Governor of Guam
- Benjamin Gratz Brown (1826–1885), 20th Governor of Missouri
- Daniel Russell Brown (1848–1919), 43rd Governor of Rhode Island
- Ethan Allen Brown (1776–1852), 7th Governor of Ohio
- Frank Brown (governor) (1846–1920), 42nd Governor of Maryland
- Fred H. Brown (1879–1955), 59th Governor of New Hampshire
- George Brown (Governor of Bombay) (fl. 1810s), Governor of Bombay from 1811 to 1812
- Jerry Brown (born 1938), 34th and 39th Governor of California, son of Pat Brown
- John Y. Brown (politician, born 1835) (1835–1904), 31st Governor of Kentucky
- John Y. Brown Jr. (born 1933), 55th Governor of Kentucky
- John C. Brown (1827–1889), 19th Governor of Tennessee
- John William Brown (1913–1993), 58th Governor of Ohio
- Joseph E. Brown (1821–1894), Governor of Georgia
- Joseph Mackey Brown (1851–1932), Governor of Georgia, son of Joseph E. Brown
- Kate Brown (born 1960), Governor of Oregon
- Montfort Browne (fl. 1760–1780), 4th Governor of British West Florida
- Neill S. Brown (1810–1886), 42nd Governor of Tennessee
- Pat Brown (1905–1996), 32nd Governor of California
- Thomas Brown (Florida politician) (1785–1867), 2nd Governor of Florida
- Thomas Gore Browne (1807–1887), Governor of Saint Helena from 1851 to 1854, 4th Governor of New Zealand, 2nd Governor of Tasmania
