= List of artists who reached number one on the Canadian Hot 100 =

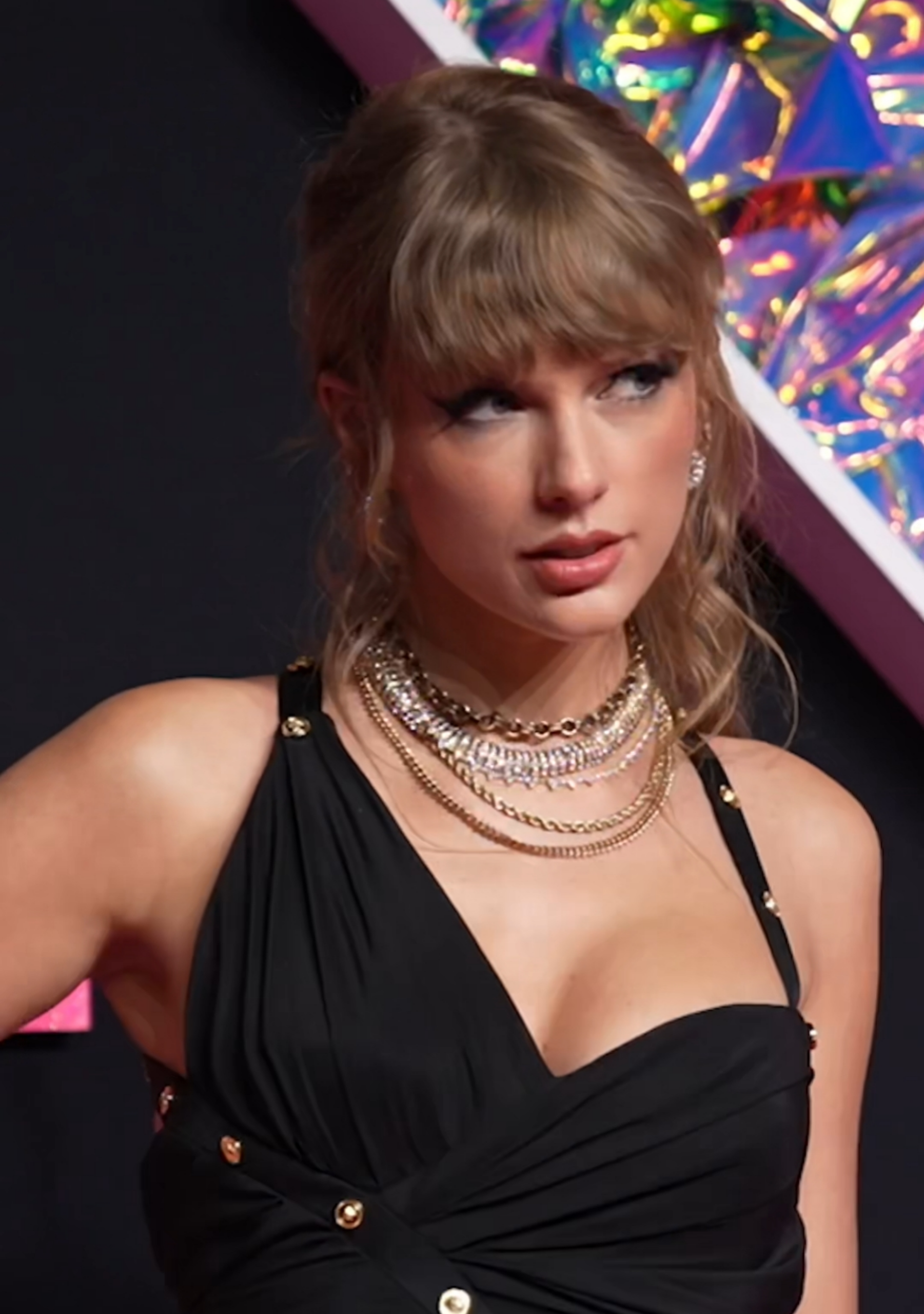
Taylor Swift is the artist with the most Canadian Hot 100 number-one songs (15).

This is a list of recording artists who have reached number one on Billboard magazine's weekly Canadian Hot 100 chart. The Canadian Hot 100 was launched on the issue dated March 31, 2007, and is currently the standard record chart in Canada.

== List inclusions ==
- This list spans from the issue dated March 31, 2007 to the present.
- All acts are listed alphabetically, solo artists by last name, groups by group name excluding "A", "An", and "The".
- Each act's total of number-one hits is shown after their name.
- All artists who are officially namechecked in song credits are listed here; this includes one-time pairings of otherwise solo artists and those appearing as "featuring".
- "Wavin' Flag" is credited to Young Artists for Haiti, and not the individual artists who participated in the recording.
- Artists associated with a group who reached number one, yet have their own solo page in Wikipedia, are not listed here unless they hit number one as a solo artist.

== 0-9 ==
- 6lack (1)
- 21 Savage (4)
- 24kGoldn (1)
- 50 Cent (1)

== A ==
- Gracie Abrams (1)
- Adele (3)
- Afrojack (1)
- Christina Aguilera (2)
- Akon (1)
- Rei Ami (1)
- Iggy Azalea (1)

== B ==
- Sara Bareilles (1)
- Lauren Bennett (1)
- Beyoncé (2)
- Justin Bieber (13)
- Kodak Black (1)
- The Black Eyed Peas (3)
- Benny Blanco (1)
- Metro Boomin (2)
- Benson Boone (1)
- Bad Bunny (1)

== C ==
- Camila Cabello (2)
- Daniel Caesar (1)
- Lewis Capaldi (1)
- Cardi B (2)
- Mariah Carey (1)
- The Chainsmokers (1)
- Chance the Rapper (2)
- Kelly Clarkson (1)
- Bradley Cooper (1)
- Taio Cruz (2)
- Kid Cudi (1)
- Billy Ray Cyrus (1)
- Miley Cyrus (2)

== D ==
- DaBaby (2)
- Daft Punk (1)
- Dazy (1)
- Olivia Dean (1)
- Jason Derulo (1)
- Iann Dior (1)
- Doja Cat (1)
- Dr. Dre (1)
- Drake (14)

== E ==
- Billie Eilish (1)
- Ejae (1)
- Mikky Ekko (1)
- Eminem (6)

== F ==
- Fergie (1)
- Flo Rida (4)
- Luis Fonsi (1)
- Fun (1)
- Nelly Furtado (1)
- Future (1)

== G ==
- Childish Gambino (1)
- Giveon (1)
- Glass Animals (1)
- Selena Gomez (2)
- GoonRock (1)
- Gotye (1)
- Ariana Grande (7)
- A Great Big World (1)
- David Guetta (2)

== H ==
- Halsey (1)
- Jack Harlow (2)
- Calvin Harris (2)
- Keri Hilson (1)
- Huntrix (1)

== I ==
- Enrique Iglesias (1)

== J ==
- Jay-Z (1)
- Jawsh 685 (1)
- Carly Rae Jepsen (2)
- Saint Jhn (1)
- Elton John (1)
- Jonas Brothers (1)
- Juicy J (1)

== K ==
- Kesha (2)
- DJ Khaled (2)
- Wiz Khalifa (2)
- The Kid Laroi (1)
- Kimbra (1)
- Sean Kingston (1)
- Kyla (1)

== L ==
- Lady Gaga (7)
- Kendrick Lamar (3)
- Ella Langley (1)
- Avril Lavigne (1)
- Brenda Lee (1)
- Swae Lee (1)
- John Legend (1)
- Leona Lewis (1)
- Lil Durk (1)
- Lil Nas X (2)
- Lil Pump (1)
- Lil Tjay (1)
- Lil Wayne (1)
- Dua Lipa (2)
- LMFAO (2)
- Jennifer Lopez (1)
- Lorde (1)
- Ludacris (1)
- Lukas Graham (1)

== M ==
- MØ (1)
- Macklemore & Ryan Lewis (1)
- Madonna (2)
- Major Lazer (1)
- Post Malone (5)
- Maroon 5 (5)
- Bruno Mars (7)
- Tate McRae (2)
- Shawn Mendes (2)
- M.I.A. (1)
- Nicki Minaj (1)
- Janelle Monáe (1)

== N ==
- Nayer (1)
- Ne-Yo (1)
- Nico & Vinz (1)
- Audrey Nuna (1)

== O ==
- Colby O'Donis (1)
- Offset (1)
- Omi (1)
- OneRepublic (2)
- Owl City (1)

== P ==
- Sean Paul (1)
- Katy Perry (10)
- Kim Petras (1)
- Pink (2)
- Pitbull (4)
- Plain White T's (1)
- Polo G (1)
- Psy (1)
- Charlie Puth (1)

== Q ==
- Quavo (1)

== R ==
- Rema (1)
- Bebe Rexha (1)
- Roddy Ricch (2)
- Rihanna (11)
- Olivia Rodrigo (4)
- Mark Ronson (1)
- Rosé (1)
- Nate Ruess (1)

== S ==
- The Scotts (1)
- Travis Scott (4)
- Shaboozey (1)
- Ed Sheeran (3)
- Sia (2)
- Sam Smith (2)
- Snoop Dogg (1)
- Britney Spears (5)
- Megan Thee Stallion (1)
- Harry Styles (1)
- Taylor Swift (15)

== T ==
- Robin Thicke (1)
- Young Thug (1)
- T.I. (1)
- Timbaland (3)
- Justin Timberlake (3)
- Tones and I (1)
- T-Pain (1)
- Meghan Trainor (1)
- Ty Dolla Sign (1)

== U ==
- Usher (1)

== W ==
- Morgan Wallen (2)
- Wanz (1)
- Alex Warren (1)
- The Weeknd (7)
- Kanye West (3)
- will.i.am (1)
- Pharrell Williams (2)
- Wizkid (1)

== X ==
- Charli XCX (1)

== Y ==
- Daddy Yankee (1)
- Nikki Yanofsky (1)
- Yeat (1)
- Young Artists for Haiti (1)
- Nicky Youre (1)

== Z ==
- Zayn (1)

== See also ==
- List of artists by number of Canadian number-one singles (RPM)
