= Hurt Me Tomorrow =

Single by K'naan

from the album Country, God or the Girl
- Released: 1 May 2012
- Recorded: 2011
- Genre: Pop rap, pop-soul
- Length: 3:47
- Label: A&M Octone Records
- Songwriter(s): Ryan Tedder, Evan Bogart, Noel Zancanella, Keinan Warsame
- Producer(s): Ryan Tedder

K'naan singles chronology
"Is Anybody Out There?" (2012)	"Hurt Me Tomorrow" (2012)

"Hurt Me Tomorrow" is a song by Somali-Canadian artist K'naan from his fourth studio album Country, God or the Girl. It was released as a digital download on 1 May 2012. The song was written by Ryan Tedder, Evan Bogart, Noel Zancanella and K'naan himself. The song was featured in the 2014 film Neighbors.

== Track listing ==
Digital download
No.	Title	Length
1.	"Hurt Me Tomorrow"	3:47

== Credits and personnel ==
- Lead vocals – K'naan
- Lyrics – Ryan Tedder, Evan Bogart, Noel Zancanella, Keinan Warsame
- Label: A&M/Octone Records
- Engineer - Smith Carlson

== Chart performance ==
=== Weekly charts ===
Chart (2012)	Peak position
Canada (Canadian Hot 100)	12
Czech Republic (Rádio – Top 100)	62
New Zealand (Recorded Music NZ)	16
US Pop Airplay (Billboard)	37

=== Year-end charts ===
Chart (2012)	Position
Canada (Canadian Hot 100)	70

== Certifications ==
Region	Certification	Certified units/sales
Canada (Music Canada)	Platinum	80,000^{*}
^{*} Sales figures based on certification alone.

== Release history ==
Region	Date	Format	Label
United States	1 May 2012	Digital download	A&M Octone Records
New Zealand	25 June 2012	Digital download	A&M Octone Records
