= ABCs (song) =

Single by K'naan featuring Chubb Rock

from the album Troubadour
- Released: November 18, 2008
- Recorded: 2008
- Genre: Canadian hip hop; Afrobeat
- Length: 3:10
- Label: A&M/Octone
- Songwriters: Gerald Eaton; Keinan Abdi Warsame; Brian West
- Producers: Gerald Eaton; Brian West

K'naan singles chronology
"ABCs" (2008)	"Wavin' Flag" (2009)

Chubb Rock singles chronology
"Yabadabadoo" (1993)	"ABCs" (2008)

"ABCs" is the first official single by rapper K'naan on his album Troubadour. It also features rapper Chubb Rock and is produced by Gerald Eaton and Brian West. The song was also featured on the soundtrack for the video game Madden 09 and in both the film and the trailer for The Trotsky. The song can be heard in the films Step Up 3D (2010) and The Roommate (2011). It samples Chubb Rock's "Treat 'Em Right" and Mulatu Astatke's "Kasalefkut hulu".

== Music video ==
The video was directed by Marcus Raboy and was filmed at the Brooklyn Bridge and Williamsburg, Brooklyn, New York. It begins with K'naan walking across the bridge and he buys a vinyl record at the Pass Out Records store. While K'naan is walking along a street, Chubb Rock drives up in a 1965 Pontiac Catalina with two large speakers in the back, picks up K'naan, they go to a party. K'naan then walks along a street, under an elevated Subway. America's Best Dance Crew Season 2 Champions Super Cr3w make an appearance.

== Chart positions ==
"ABCs" debuted at number 75 on the Canadian Hot 100 on the issue of March 3, 2009, based on downloads.

Chart (2009)	Peak position
Canadian Hot 100	75
