= J.Period =

- Also known as: The Mixtape Assassin
- Born: Joel Astman; February 12, 1975 (age 51)
- Origin: Los Angeles, California, U.S.
- Genres: Hip hop, reggae, R&B
- Occupations: Disc jockey, remixer, producer
- Years active: 1993–present
- Label: Truelements Music(2000-present)
- Website: jperiod.com

Joel Astman (born February 12, 1975), known professionally as J.Period, is a Brooklyn-based mixtape DJ, remixer and hip-hop producer. He is best known for producing official mixtape collaborations with Q-Tip, John Legend, Nas, Big Daddy Kane, Rakim, Lauryn Hill, the Roots, the Isley Brothers and Mary J. Blige, and an "audio-biography" style that incorporates personal interviews with these artists into his "Best Of" compilations. His original productions and remixes have also appeared in film trailers for Universal Pictures' American Gangster (2007) and Fox Searchlight's Street Kings (2008). In November 2008, J.Period became the first DJ/producer commissioned by Activision to score and produce an entire video game soundtrack, Tony Hawk's Motion for Nintendo DS.

== Awards and accolades ==
- 2003 – Elemental Magazine, Awarded Mixtape DJ Rookie of the Year
- 2003 – i-jonez.com, Awarded Mixtape of the Year (J.Period, Best of Big Daddy Kane)
- 2004 – Toyota/ Scion “Free Up Your Mix” DJ Competition, Awarded New York Champion
- 2005 – Source Magazine, Awarded Mixtape DJ of the Year
- 2005 – MTV, Awarded Top 10 Mixtapes of 2005 (J.Period Best of Lauryn Hill)
- 2006 – MTV, Awarded Top DJs of 2006
- 2006 – Power Summit, Awarded Mixtape DJ of the Year
- 2006 – Allhiphop.com, Awarded Best Mixtapes of 2006 (J.Period, Best of The Roots)
- 2006 – About.com, Awarded Best Mixtapes of 2006: Runner-Up (J.Period, Best of The Roots)
- 2007 – MTV, Awarded Top 5 DJs of 2007
- 2007 – New York Magazine, Awarded Top 10 Mixtapes of 2007 (J.Period & G. Brown, March 9)
- 2008 – MTV, Awarded Top Street Albums (J.Period & G Brown, March 9: B.I.G. Tribute)
- 2009 – Beyond Race Magazine, Awarded Top Albums of 2009 (J.Period & Nneka, "The Madness (Onye-Ala)")

== Discography ==
=== Video games ===
- 2008 – Tony Hawk's Motion for Nintendo DS (produced soundtrack for premiere gaming franchise)
- 2009 – DJ Hero for Xbox 360, PS3 and Nintendo Wii (produced a number of playable mixes for the game)

=== Film and television ===
- 1999 – Strictly Rockers (appeared on Showtime's ShoNext network)
- 2007 – 25th Hour (Remix) – (appeared in TV Spots for Universal Pictures' American Gangster)
- 2008 – J.Period & Game Rebellion: Break Down (appeared in trailers for Fox Searchlight's Street Kings)

=== Albums ===
- 2002 – Zion I: Deep Water Slang (J.Period performs scratches)
- 2005 – Zion I: True & Livin (J.Period performs scratches)

=== Singles ===
- 2003 – Zion I f. J.Period: "The Drill / Flow" (12") - J.Period performs scratches
- 2005 – J.Period & Lauryn Hill: Best of Lauryn Hill Remixes (12") (vinyl only)
- 2005 – Fugees: "Take It Easy" (12") (J.Period performs scratches)
- 2006 – J.Period & C.L. Smooth: Man on Fire Freestyles (vinyl only)
- 2006 – J.Period & Black Thought – Roots Exclusives & Freestyles (vinyl only)
- 2007 – J.Period & G. Brown: March 9 B.I.G. Remixes (vinyl only)
- 2008 – J.Period: "Q-Tip for President (Exclusive Freestyle)" (free download)
- 2008 – J.Period: "Primo Tribute Intro" (free download)
- 2009 – J.Period: "Excursions 2009 (Tribute Remix)" (free download)
- 2009 – J.Period: "Buggin' Out 2009 (Tribute Remix)" (free download)
- 2009 – J.Period & Black Thought – "Brooklyn Go Hard" (Live at Brooklyn Hip Hop Festival 2009) (free download)
- 2009 – J.Period & Talib Kweli – "Ambitionz (Exclusive Freestyle)" (free download)
- 2009 – J.Period & Talib Kweli – "Youthful (Exclusive Freestyle)" (free download)
- 2009 – J.Period & Talib Kweli – "Country Couzins" feat. Bun B (J.Period Remix)" (free download)
- 2009 – J.Period & Nneka – "Changes (J.Period Remix)" feat. M-1 & General Steele (free download)
- 2009 – J.Period & Nneka – "Walking (J.Period Remix)" feat. Jay Electronica (free download)

=== Mixtapes ===
- 2000 – Beats from New York
- 2000 – Elements of Hip Hop Culture
- 2001 – Warr Uv Da Worldz: Drum’n’Bass vs. Hip Hop
- 2001 – Sound Clash Vol. 1: Reggae
- 2001 – Love Jones Vol. 1
- 2001 – Live at DJ Honda’s h272 Vol. 1
- 2002 – Live at DJ Honda’s h272 Vol. 2
- 2002 – Introducing J.Period: 2CD
- 2002 – Truelements Radio
- 2002 – Dark Dayz
- 2003 – Love Jones Vol. 2 Classic Soul
- 2003 – Love Jones Vol. 3 Love No Limit
- 2003 – Ecko Love Unlimited 2
- 2003 – J.Period & Big Daddy Kane: Best of Big Daddy Kane (Hosted by BDK)<
- 2004 – Sound Clash Vol. 2: Reggae
- 2004 – In The Trunk: Heavy Bass
- 2004 – J.Period & Nas: Best of Nas (Hosted by Nas)
- 2004 – Ecko Unlimitd Holiday Hook-Up (Promo Only)
- 2005 – J.Period & Lauryn Hill: Best of Lauryn Hill: Fire & Water
- 2006 – Class of 06: G.O.O.D. Music
- 2006 – Official Best of Isley Brothers(Remixed)
- 2006 – C.L. Smooth: Man On Fire Freestyle Sessions
- 2006 – J.Period & The Roots: Official Best of The Roots
- 2007 – J.Period & G. Brown: March 9 B.I.G. Tribute
- 2007 – J.Period, JS-1 & DV-One: Rock Steady Crew 30th Anniversary Tribute
- 2007 – J.Period & Game Rebellion: Searching for Rick Rubin
- 2007 – J.Period & DJ KL: The Blast (Promo Only)
- 2007 – Tanqueray T&T Style Sessions Promo Mix, Mixed by J.Period
- 2008 – Toyota Camry Magazine Promo Mix, Mixed by J.Period
- 2008 – J.Period & G. Brown: March 9 Vol.2 Collector's Edition
- 2008 – J.Period, Don Cannon &Skillz : Design Of A Decade Vol.1
- 2009 – J.Period & Q-Tip: The [Abstract] Best Vol. 1
- 2009 – J.Period & K'naan The Messengers
- 2009 – Man or The Music: A Tribute To Michael Jackson
- 2009 – J.Period & Nneka The Madness (Onye-Ala)
- 2011 – J.Period, The Roots & John Legend Wake Up! Radio
- 2012 – J.Period & Zion I Bomb First
- 2013 - #RAGEISBACK
- 2016 - The Hamilton Mixtape
- 2019 - The RISE UP Project
- 2019 - J.Period Presents The Live Mixtape [The Healing Edition] feat. Maimouna Youssef aka Mumu Fresh
- 2021 - J.Period Presents... The Live Mixtape: Story to Tell Edition
