= Kathryn Bigelow's unrealized projects =

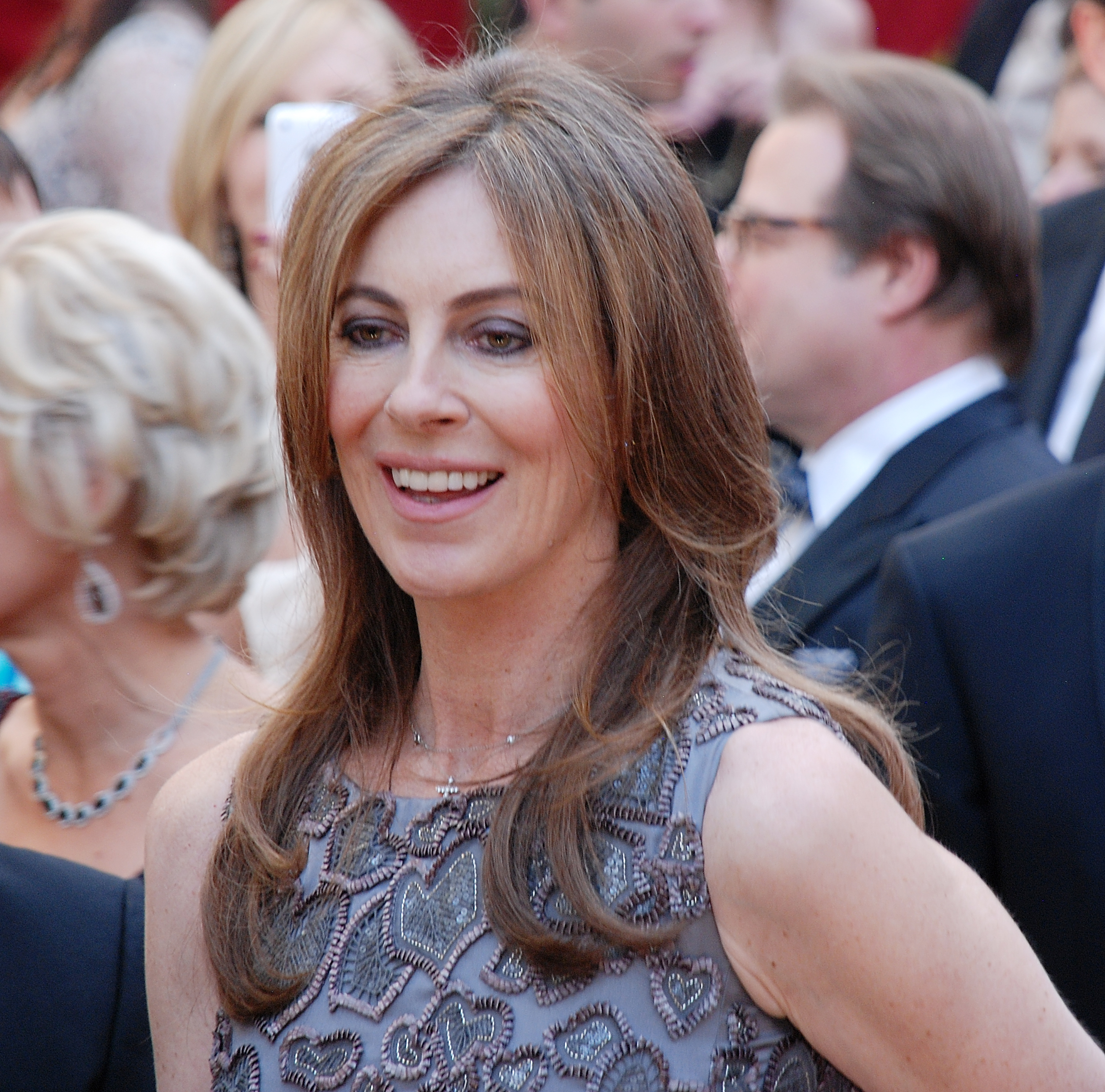
Bigelow attending the 82nd annual Academy Awards ceremony in 2010

During her long career, film director Kathryn Bigelow has worked on several projects which never progressed beyond the pre-production stage under her direction. Some of these projects fell in development hell, were officially cancelled, were in development limbo or would see life under a different production team.

== 1980s ==
=== Untitled East Harlem gangs film ===
Around 1983, Bigelow pitched a story about gang factions in East Harlem to Walter Hill, after he had asked her what film she was interested in doing next following The Loveless. The project remained stuck in turnaround at Universal Pictures, under Hill's producing deal, over the course of various studio regime changes.

=== Untitled Oliver Stone film ===
After reading her script on Harlem gang culture, in the mid-1980s, Oliver Stone asked Bigelow if she co-write a new project with him on the gangs of South Los Angeles. She agreed, and the two began to conduct research, but development halted when Stone's projects Salvador and Platoon were both greenlit. This collaboration eventually led to Stone producing her film Blue Steel.

=== New Rose Hotel ===
The Los Angeles Times reported in 1988 that Bigelow was slated to direct the film adaptation of William Gibson's short story "New Rose Hotel" for producer Edward R. Pressman.

=== Wolverine and the X-Men ===
Around 1989, Stan Lee and Chris Claremont entered in talks with Carolco Pictures and Lightstorm Entertainment to make a film adaptation of the X-Men comic book series, with Bigelow as director, James Cameron producing and Gary Goldman as writer. Bob Hoskins was slated to star as Wolverine and Angela Bassett was attached to star as Storm. However, the project entered into development hell, which led to Cameron's involvement on the long planned Spider-Man film as well as the demise of Carolco Pictures. The film was finally released in 2000 with Bryan Singer as director.

== 1990s ==
=== The Company of Angels ===
On October 6, 1992, Bigelow was attached to direct and produce the period piece The Company of Angels through Carolco and Lightstorm Entertainment, with Winona Ryder officially attached to portray Joan of Arc and Warner Bros. distributing. However, the project entered into development hell and Luc Besson used this movie's funds to make The Messenger: The Story of Joan of Arc instead.

=== Burning Chrome ===
Sci-fi author William Gibson wrote a screenplay for a film adaptation of his 1982 short story "Burning Chrome" to be directed by Bigelow, but the project did not reach fruition. Gibson claimed that it was "developed to death" and "getting more and more frustrating" to make as a film. Bigelow's then-spouse James Cameron was also involved with the project. It is believed that Bigelow agreed to direct Strange Days in place of Burning Chrome, instead.

=== Custer Marching to Valhalla ===
On November 5, 1997, it was reported that Bigelow was signed by New Line Cinema as the director of Custer Marching to Valhalla, an epic based on Michael Blake's novel about the rise and fall of General George Armstrong Custer. Blake would have developed and written the screenplay for Bigelow to direct.

=== Ohio ===
In the late 1990s, Bigelow developed a project for Universal Pictures titled Ohio about the 1970 Kent State shooting and the killings of four students. Kent State alumni Jim Hart, who witnessed the event take place, wrote the script and stated that the film would "be [his] generation's Best Years of Our Lives." Attached to produce were Tony Lord, Matthew Weaver, John Davis, as well as Hart and his partner Valerie Kerns.

== 2000s ==
=== Paycheck ===
In the early 2000s, Bigelow considered directing the film Paycheck based on the 1953 short story by Philip K. Dick.

=== The Devil in the White City ===
On April 8, 2003, it was announced that Bigelow would direct and produce the film adaptation of Erik Larson's novel The Devil in the White City with Tom Cruise as H. H. Holmes for Paramount Pictures and Cruise/Wagner Productions. However, insiders claimed the project stalled over creative differences between Bigelow and Cruise/Wagner.

=== The Inside TV pilot ===
On September 25, 2003, Bigelow was set to direct the pilot episode written by Todd and Glen Kesser, based on Mark Boal's Playboy article about a 23-year-old woman who posed as a 16-year-old student to infiltrate a drug ring, through Imagine Television for Fox, which would become The Inside.

=== Triple Frontier ===
On August 9, 2009, Bigelow was interested in directing Mark Boal's action thriller script Triple Frontier, an ensemble project based on an idea Bigelow and Boal had, with Charles Roven, Alex Gartner and Steve Alexander attached to produce through Atlas Entertainment for Paramount Pictures. Tom Hanks and Johnny Depp entered talks for the project in October 2010. Bigelow eventually departed the film, with J. C. Chandor closing a deal to replace her as director in September 2015. The film would eventually be released on Netflix on March 13, 2019.

== 2010s ==
=== Held by the Taliban ===
On January 15, 2010, Bigelow was interested in directing Held by the Taliban, a biopic about the kidnapping of David Rohde with Stephen Belber writing the script and Frank Marshall and Kathleen Kennedy attached to produce, but later that same day, Terrence Malick was set to direct another biopic which inspired a duel between the filmmakers.

=== The Miraculous Year TV series ===
On February 14, 2010, Bigelow was set to produce John Logan's Broadway composer series The Miraculous Year for HBO, as well as direct the pilot episode. In June later that same year, Norbert Leo Butz, Hope Davis, Frank Langella and Patti LuPone were in talks to star in the series, as well as Eddie Redmayne, and in July, Susan Sarandon, Linus Roache, Stark Sands, Elaine Cassidy, Remy Nozik, Logan Georges, Lee Pace, Louis Ozawa Changchien, Giancarlo Esposito, Karine Plantadit, Andre Ward, Erik Altemus, Brooks Ashmanskas, and Daniel Davis were also cast. On November 9, 2010, it was announced HBO would not be moving forward with the series.

=== The True American ===
On May 14, 2014, Bigelow was set to direct and produce the biographical film adaptation of Anand Giridharadas' novel The True American with Matthew Budman attached as executive producer for Annapurna Pictures and Tom Hardy attached to portray Mark Stroman. On April 4, 2017, Pablo Larrain was set to direct the film adaptation instead of Bigelow.

=== Untitled Bowe Bergdahl biopic ===
On June 16, 2014, Bigelow was interested in directing a biopic about Bowe Bergdahl with Mark Boal writing the screenplay for Annapurna Pictures, while later that same day, Fox Searchlight Pictures acquired the rights to Michael Hastings' article about Bergdahl, "America's Last Prisoner Of War", with Todd Field attached to that project. On January 17, 2015, Bigelow's biopic supposedly won the duel with Searchlight, but Bigelow and Boal ended up making Detroit instead.

=== Mogadishu, Minnesota TV series ===
On December 11, 2015, Bigelow was set to produce K'naan Warsame's jihadi recruitment drama series The Recruiters for HBO. On June 6, 2016, HBO ordered a pilot for the series, which would focus on a Somali immigrant family and was retitled Mogadishu, Minnesota. On September 1, 2017, it was announced HBO would not be picking up the series.

== 2020s ==
=== Aurora ===
In March 2022, it was announced that Bigelow would direct an adaptation of David Koepp's book, Aurora for Netflix, with Koepp writing the script. In April 2024, The New York Times reported the film was not moving forward at Netflix, and Bigelow had departed the project months ago.

=== Nuclear War: A Scenario ===
Bigelow originally wanted to adapt Annie Jacobsen's Nuclear War: A Scenario into a film, but Legendary Pictures bought the rights and handed them to Denis Villeneuve in 2024. She and screenwriter Noah Oppenheim opted to retool "Part II" of the book into their own script, A House of Dynamite, that repeats the same eighteen-minute countdown three times from three different perspectives.

=== Unarmed ===
In March 2026, during an interview on the Tetragrammaton podcast, screenwriter Eric Roth revealed that Denis Johnson's script of Unarmed was "close" to getting made with Bigelow possibly directing. The project—previously developed as an HBO limited series—revolves around an Armed Forces medical center.

== Offers ==
=== The Amazing Spider-Man ===
On March 9, 2010, Bigelow was offered to direct The Amazing Spider-Man, but turned it down.

=== Rise of the Planet of the Apes ===
Bigelow was one of several directors who was courted to direct the reboot of Planet of the Apes, but ultimately turned it down.

=== Tomb Raider ===
On September 16, 2015, Bigelow was rumored to direct the reboot of the Tomb Raider film series, which became the 2018 film Tomb Raider, which was directed by Roar Uthaug.
