= The Dusty Foot Philosopher =

Studio album by K'naan
- Released: June 7, 2005
- Recorded: 2002–2005
- Genre: African hip hop, folk
- Length: 64:00
- Label: BMG
- Producer: Track & Field

K'naan chronology
My Life Is a Movie (2004)	The Dusty Foot Philosopher (2005)	The Dusty Foot on the Road (2007)

The Dusty Foot Philosopher is the debut studio album by the Somali-Canadian rapper K'naan. It was released by BMG Music on June 7, 2005, in Canada and on June 23, 2005, in the United States.

== Critical reception ==
Professional ratings
Review scores
Source	Rating
AllMusic	3.5/5 stars
NOW Magazine	4/5 stars
The Observer	4/5 stars
Okayplayer	84/100
PopMatters	7/10
RapReviews	8/10
Robert Christgau	A
Spin	4/5 stars

The Dusty Foot Philosopher was widely acclaimed by critics. K'naan received particular praise for addressing serious topics, such as the wartorn conditions in his childhood home of Mogadishu, while still managing to display lightheartedness and humor. K'naan's choruses were also singled out for praise, with reviewers labeling them "deft" and "infectious". A more mixed appraisal of the album's songwriting came from Miles Duncan of Okayplayer, who opined that the album's focus on Somalia caused it to fall into "drab uniformity".

The production on The Dusty Foot Philosopher received significant attention for its distinctive, African-influenced sound; critics particularly highlighted the splashing-water melody of opening track "Wash It Down", which Robert Christgau likened to Mbuti water drumming.

== Awards ==
The album won the Juno Award for Rap Recording of the Year in 2006 and was shortlisted for the 2006 Polaris Music Prize. He also was nominated for an mtvU award for most downloads of his song, "Soobax". In November 2007, the album was included in The Guardian's list of 1000 Albums to Hear Before You Die. The album was put at 194 on Rolling Stone's list of the Top 200 Greatest Rap Albums of All Time.

== Soundtracks ==
"In the Beginning" is part of the soundtrack of the 2008 comedy Harold & Kumar Escape from Guantanamo Bay. This song also gives the title for episode 7 of the fifth season of True Blood, appearing in the closing credits of the episode. "Soobax" was used on the soundtrack for the video game FIFA 06.

== Track listing ==
No.	Title	Length
1.	"Wash It Down"	2:16
2.	"Soobax"	3:42
3.	"What's Hardcore?"	3:36
4.	"My Old Home"	3:06
5.	"Moment (Interlude)"	0:10
6.	"I Was Stabbed By Satan"	3:52
7.	"My God (Interlude)"	0:22
8.	"Smile"	4:03
9.	"If Rap Gets Jealous"	4:18
10.	"The Dusty Foot Philosopher"	3:56
11.	"Strugglin'"	3:34
12.	"In the Beginning"	3:21
13.	"Hoobaale"	5:05
14.	"The African Way" (featuring Mwafrika)	4:21
15.	"Voices in My Head"	4:00
16.	"Boxing My Shadow"	4:29
17.	"For Mohamoud (Soviet)"	0:32
18.	"Until the Lion Learns to Speak"	2:28
19.	"Blues for the Horn"	5:59
20.	"'Til We Get There" (with M-1 featuring Stori James)	4:25
