= Country, God or the Girl =

Studio album by K'naan
- Released: October 16, 2012
- Recorded: 2010–2012
- Genre: Hip-hop; pop rock; Afrobeat; folk
- Length: 46:58 (standard edition); 63:09 (deluxe edition)
- Label: A&M/Octone
- Producer: RedOne; Edwin "Lil Eddie" Serrano; Sham & Motesart; Chuck Harmony; Brian "Sweetwesty" West; Jimmy Joker; Jon Levine; Wayne Wilkin; Troy NoKA; Glass; Bob Ezrin; Alex da Kid; will.i.am; Ryan Tedder

K'naan chronology
More Beautiful Than Silence (2012)	Country, God or the Girl (2012)

Singles from Country, God or the Girl
- 1. "Is Anybody Out There?" Released: January 24, 2012; 2. "Nothing to Lose" Released: February 1, 2012; 3. "Hurt Me Tomorrow" Released: May 1, 2012

Professional ratings
Aggregate scores
Source	Rating
Metacritic	74/100
Review scores
Source	Rating
AllMusic	4/5 stars
PopMatters	6/10

Country, God or the Girl is the third and final studio album by Somali-Canadian hip hop artist K'naan. It was released worldwide on October 16, 2012.

== Background and development ==
The album was first announced in February 2012, with a release date of May 1, 2012. Coinciding with the announcement, he confirmed that he had collaborated with Nas, U2 lead singer Bono, Keith Richards of the Rolling Stones, American hip-hop and electronic artist and producer will.i.am and Canadian singer-songwriter Nelly Furtado.

== Release and promotion ==
=== Singles ===
"Is Anybody Out There?" was released as the lead single from More Beautiful Than Silence. It features vocals from Nelly Furtado. The song was released as a promotional single in the United States in early January, and as a single worldwide on January 24, 2011. The single made its chart debut on the Canadian Hot 100 at number 67, before peaking at number 14. It notably topped the New Zealand charts and peaked at number 92 on the Billboard Hot 100.

"Nothing to Lose", featuring American hip-hop artist Nas, was released as the second single from More Beautiful Than Silence on February 1, 2012.

"Hurt Me Tomorrow" was released as the album's first official single on May 1, 2012, notably the album's original release date. It peaked at number 12 on the Canadian Hot 100 and at number 37 on the Billboard Pop Songs chart.

== Critical reception ==
Country, God or the Girl received generally positive reviews from music critics. At Metacritic, which assigns a normalized rating out of 100 to reviews from mainstream critics, the album received an average score of 74, based on 5 reviews, which indicates "generally favorable reviews". K'naan wrote an op-ed criticizing himself and his attempts to make the album more palatable for American audiences.

== Track listing ==
Standard edition
No.	Title	Writer(s)	Producer(s)	Length
1.	"The Seed"	Keinan Warsame; Denarius Motes; Lil' Eddie Edwin Serrano	Sham & Motesart	3:35
2.	"Gold in Timbuktu"	Warsame; Chilly Gonzales; Charles Harmon	Chuck Harmony	4:34
3.	"Waiting Is a Drug"	Warsame; Gonzales; Harmon	Harmony	3:17
4.	"Better"	Warsame; Guy Berryman; Jonny Buckland; William Champion; Brent Kutzle; Chris Martin; Ryan Tedder; Noel Zancanella	Tedder	3:15
5.	"Simple"	Warsame; Brian West	Sweetwesty	3:26
6.	"Is Anybody Out There?" (featuring Nelly Furtado)	Warsame; Furtado; Melanie Hallim; Hasham Hussain; Motes; Lil Eddie Serrano	Sham & Motesart	3:58
7.	"Hurt Me Tomorrow"	Warsame; Evan Bogart; Tedder; Zancanella	Tedder	3:47
8.	"The Sound of My Breaking Heart"	Warsame; Jimmy Joker; RedOne; Lil Eddie Serrano	RedOne; Joker	3:51
9.	"Nothing to Lose" (featuring Nas)	Warsame; Harmon; Nasir Jones; Tim Rice-Oxley	Harmony	3:57
10.	"70 Excuses"	Warsame; West	Sweetwesty	4:11
11.	"Bulletproof Pride" (featuring Bono)	Warsame; Bono; Harmon; Jon Levine; West	Sweetwesty; Levine; Harmony	4:42
12.	"The Wall"	Warsame; Antwoine Collins; David Glass; Wayne Wilkins	Wilkins; Troy NoKA; Glass	4:27
Total length:				46:58

Deluxe edition
No.	Title	Writer(s)	Producer(s)	Length
13.	"Sleep When We Die" (featuring Keith Richards)	Warsame; Lil Eddie Serrano	Alex da Kid	4:00
14.	"More Beautiful Than Silence"	Warsame; Harmon	Harmony	3:53
15.	"Alone" (featuring will.i.am)	Warsame; William Adams	Bob Ezrin; will.i.am	3:49
16.	"On the Other Side" (featuring Mark Foster)	Warsame; Harmon	Harmony	4:29

Deluxe edition (Digital release)
No.	Title	Writer(s)	Producer(s)	Length
17.	"Coming to America"	Warsame; Harmon; Solomon Linda	Harmony	4:02

== Personnel ==
- Smith Carlson – engineering

== Charts ==
Chart performance for Country, God or the Girl
Chart (2012)	Peak position
US Billboard 200	129
US Top Rap Albums (Billboard)	13
