= Is Anybody Out There? (song) =

2012 single by K'naan

Single by K'naan featuring Nelly Furtado

from the album More Beautiful Than Silence and Country, God or the Girl
- Released: January 24, 2012
- Recorded: 2011
- Length: 3:58
- Label: A&M/Octone; Wrasse
- Songwriters: Keinan Warsame; Edwin Serrano; Nelly Furtado; Melanie Hallim; Denarius Motes; Hasham Hussain
- Producers: Sham and Motesart

K'naan singles chronology
"Summer Paradise" (2011)	"Is Anybody Out There?" (2012)	"Hurt Me Tomorrow" (2012)

Nelly Furtado singles chronology
"Night Is Young" (2010)	"Is Anybody Out There?" (2012)	"Big Hoops (Bigger the Better)" (2012)

Music video
- "Is Anybody Out There?" on YouTube

"Is Anybody Out There?" is a song co-written and performed by Somalia-born rapper K'naan, featuring Canadian singer-songwriter Nelly Furtado, from his first extended play More Beautiful Than Silence. The song was first released as a digital download in the United States on January 24, 2012, before being physically issued in Germany on March 30. The single made its chart debut on the Canadian Hot 100 at number 67 and peaked at number 14. It was most successful in New Zealand, where it reached the top of the RIANZ chart on the week of March 12, 2012; it was Furtado's fourth number-one single in New Zealand.

== Background ==
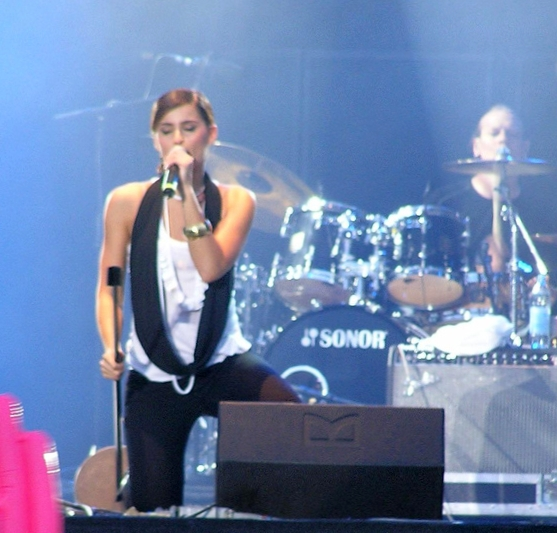
Furtado as the featured artist.

"Is Anybody Out There?" was produced by Sham & Motesart. Lyrically, the track speaks about self-assurance, separation, and loneliness. K'naan raps about the character Mary, comparing her to American actress Cameron Diaz; "Something ’bout Mary, never won a pageant / Never felt pretty, never looked like Cameron / Diaz was her last name, always been abandoned / Keep your head up baby girl, this your anthem." It is the second time the duo have collaborated, the first being "Going Away". The video for "Is Anybody Out There?" was directed by Chris Robinson in Toronto, Ontario, Canada during the first week of February. The plot follows two characters named Mary and Adam. K'naan narrates their journeys through rap. Mary struggles with her appearance and being judged by her peers the video begins with her getting kicked out of a mini mart for loitering. Adam struggles with drugs and a father who is never there for him. K'naan and Furtado are shot in a separate scene located in the desolate woods.

== Critical reception ==
"Is Anybody Out There?" obtained mixed reviews by its critics. The track received negative reviews by Jody Rosen of Rolling Stone. Rosen gave the collaboration a mere one and a half out of five stars, criticizing the song's lyrical content.

== Track listing ==
- Digital download
1. "Is Anybody Out There?" — 3:58
- CD single
1. "Is Anybody Out There?" — 3:58
2. "Is Anybody Out There?" (Cutmore Radio Edit) — 3:27

== Chart performance ==
=== Weekly charts ===
Chart (2012)	Peak position
Austria (Ö3 Austria Top 40)	7
Belgium (Ultratip Bubbling Under Flanders)	10
Belgium (Ultratip Bubbling Under Wallonia)	19
Canada Hot 100 (Billboard)	14
Canada CHR/Top 40 (Billboard)	13
Canada Hot AC (Billboard)	11
Czech Republic Airplay (ČNS IFPI)	24
Germany (GfK)	11
Hungary (Rádiós Top 40)	30
Netherlands (Dutch Top 40)	15
Netherlands (Single Top 100)	25
New Zealand (Recorded Music NZ)	1
Slovakia Airplay (ČNS IFPI)	15
Switzerland (Schweizer Hitparade)	20
US Billboard Hot 100	92
US Pop Airplay (Billboard)	27

=== Year-end charts ===
Chart (2012)	Position
Canada (Canadian Hot 100)	52
Netherlands (Dutch Top 40)	87

== Certifications ==
Region	Certification	Certified units/sales
Canada (Music Canada)	Platinum	80,000^{*}
New Zealand (RMNZ)	Gold	7,500^{*}
^{*} Sales figures based on certification alone.

== Release history ==
Release dates and formats for "Is Anybody Out There?"
Region	Date	Format	Label(s)	Ref.
United States	February 14, 2012	Mainstream airplay	A&M/Octone	
