= Jonathan Duncan (governor of Bombay) =

British colonial administrator (1756–1811)

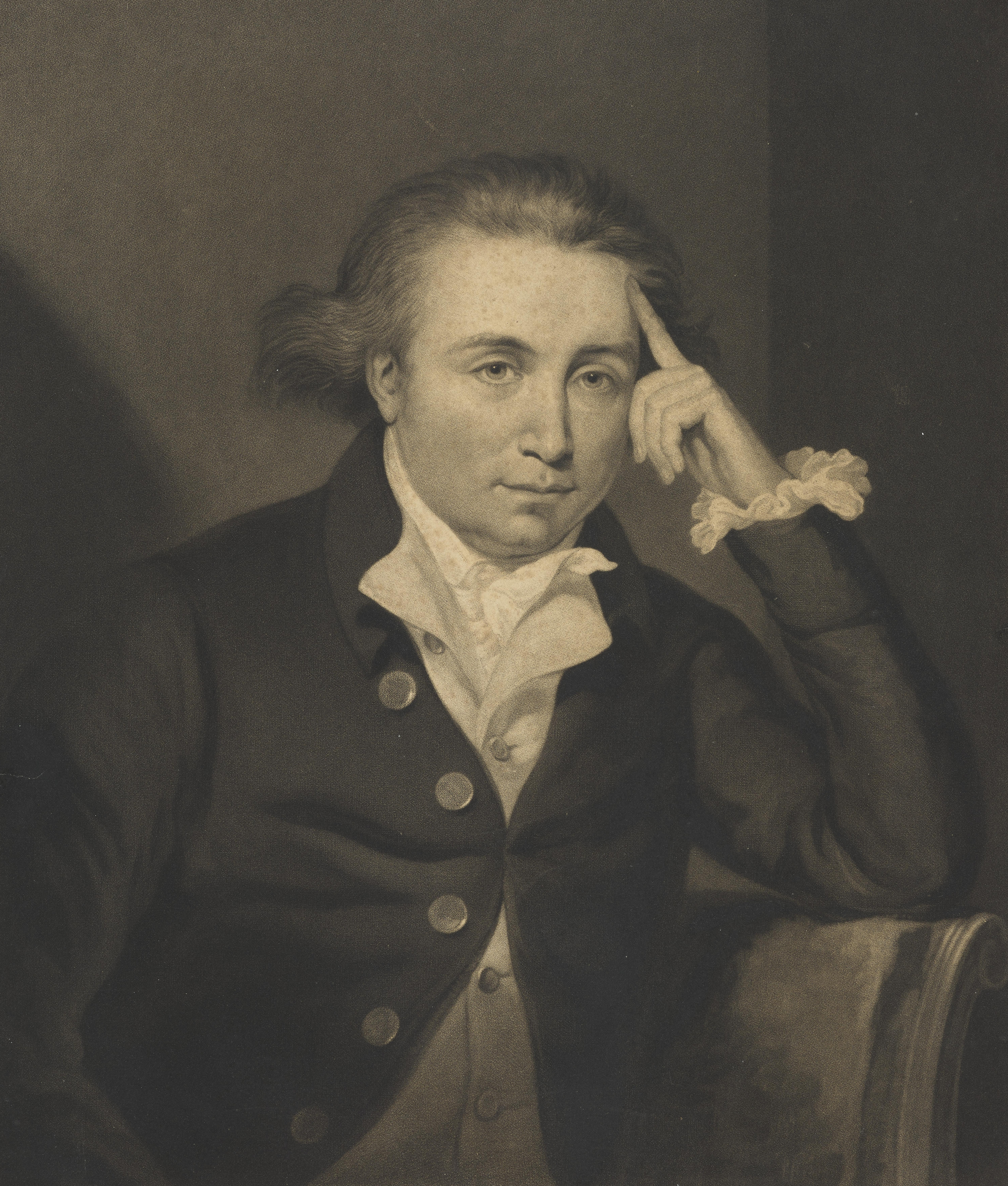
Mezzotint of Duncan

Jonathan Duncan (15 May 1756 – 11 August 1811) was a British colonial administrator who served as the governor of Bombay from 27 December 1795 until his death in 1811. He began his career in India in 1772, and in 1784 he was one of the charter members of the Asiatic Society founded in Calcutta by William Jones. In 1788, was appointed superintendent and resident at Benares by Lord Cornwallis, where he helped stamp out the practice of infanticide. In 1791, he started the Sanskrit College at Benares to promote the study of Hindu laws and philosophy in Banaras. (In 1958, the Sanskrit College became a university and in 1974 the name was changed to Sampurnanand Sanskrit University.)

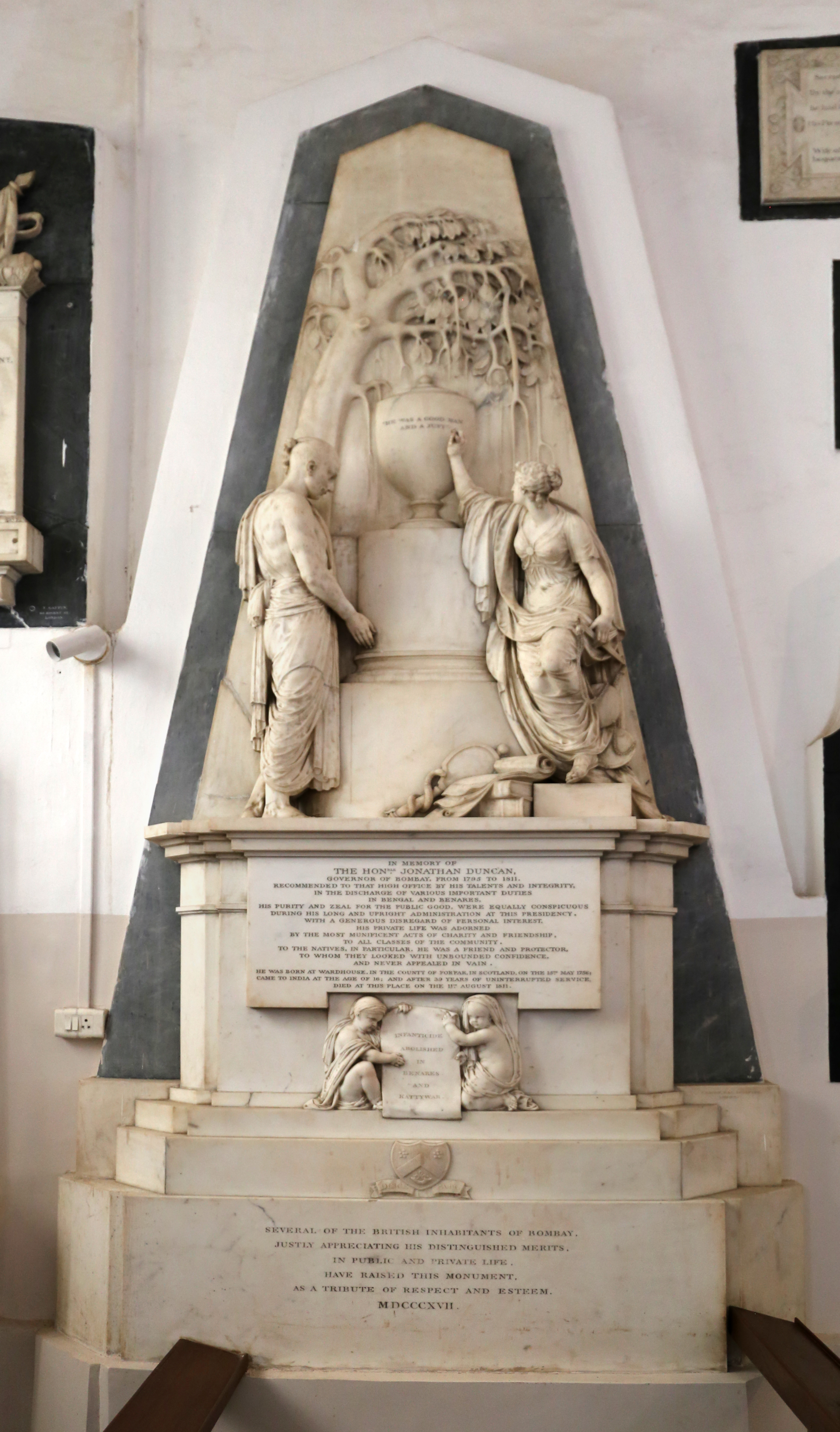
The tomb in St. Thomas Cathedral, Mumbai

In 1795, he became governor of Bombay, and held that post for the rest of his life (nearly sixteen years).

His illegitimate son, also named Jonathan Duncan, was an advocate of reforming the monetary system.

== Works ==
- Duncan, Johnathan, 1798 (or. publ. Calcutta; repr. London 1799). "Historical Remarks on the Coast of Malabar with some description of its inhabitants", Asiatic Researches vol. 5, pp. 1-36; "An Account of two Fakeers, with their portraits", ibid. pp. 36-478; "An Account of the Discovery of Two Urns in the Vicinity of Benares", ibid. pp. 131-132.
- Duncan, Johnathan, delivered by (Francis Wrede). 1819. "An Account of the Festival of Mamangom as celebrated on the Coast of Malabar", Transactions of the Literary Society of Bombay, London: Longman, Hurst, Rees, Orme, and Brown; and John Murray.

== Footnotes ==
Political offices
Preceded by John Griffith	Governor of Bombay; 1795–1811	Succeeded by George Brown
