= Young Artists for Haiti =

Canadian musical project

Wavin' Flag cover

Young Artists for Haiti was a movement to engage Canada's young musicians to continue to inspire an ongoing effort and contribution to Canadian charities for their work to help the people of Haiti overcome the devastation from the 7.1 magnitude earthquake that rocked the country on January 12, 2010. More than 50 Canadian artists gathered at The Warehouse Studio in Vancouver, British Columbia to record a rendition of renowned hip hop artist K'naan's "Wavin' Flag".

Produced by Canadian producer, Bob Ezrin, co-produced by Garth Richardson and Shawn Marino, and engineered by Mike Fraser, the song was reworked to include specific lyrics for Haiti and was released on March 12, 2010, raising over $1 million with proceeds going to Free The Children, War Child Canada and World Vision Canada. Ezrin stated, "With the wealth of young artists coming out of Canada, it was obvious that this is something we had to do. K'naan's lyrics in Wavin' Flag embody the pain, passion and determination of the Haitian people and lend the hope of a brighter future. The response from the artists has been sensational, and I am so proud that together we may help to make a difference."

== Background ==
While in Vancouver for the 2010 Winter Olympics opening ceremony, Bob Ezrin along with fellow music industry leaders, including Shawn Marino, Randy Lennox and Gary Slaight, recognized the moneymaking potential of mobilizing some of Canada's young musicians in an ongoing effort to help the people of Haiti. Within a short week, the collaboration of Young Artists for Haiti was formed. The song was recorded at The Warehouse Studio in Vancouver, which is owned by Bryan Adams, and edited at the Nimbus School of Recording Arts.

== Release of "Wavin' Flag" and chart performance ==
The song was released March 12, 2010 with all proceeds going to designated charities: World Vision, Free The Children and War Child.

"Wavin' Flag" debuted at number one on the Canadian Hot 100 on the issue dated March 27, 2010. It is the third song in the chart's history to debut at number one, after Eminem's "Crack a Bottle" and Taylor Swift's "Today Was a Fairytale" did so in February 2009 and February 2010, respectively.

| Chart (2010) | Peak position |
|---|---|
| Canada (Canadian Hot 100) | 1 |
| UK Singles (Official Charts Company) | 89 |

== Artists ==
This is the full list of performers featured on the track.

Soloists (in order of appearance)

- K'naan
- Nelly Furtado
- Sam Roberts
- Avril Lavigne
- Pierre Bouvier (of Simple Plan)
- Tyler Connolly (of Theory of a Deadman)
- Kardinal Offishall
- Jully Black
- Lights
- Deryck Whibley (of Sum 41)
- Serena Ryder
- Jacob Hoggard (of Hedley)
- Emily Haines (of Metric, Broken Social Scene)
- Hawksley Workman
- Drake
- Chin Injeti
- Pierre Lapointe, Elisapie Isaac, Ima
- Esthero, Corb Lund, Bob Ezrin
- Fefe Dobson
- Nikki Yanofsky
- Matt Mays
- Justin Nozuka
- Justin Bieber

Chorus

- Arkells
- Lamar Ashe
- Broken Social Scene
- Torquil Campbell
- Canadian Tenors
- Aion Clarke
- Dallas Green
- Tom Cochrane
- Jim Cuddy
- Jim Creeggan
- Kathleen Edwards
- Dave Faber
- Jessie Farrell
- Colin James
- Patrick Kordyback
- Brandon Lehti
- Colin MacDonald
- Jay Malinowski
- Stacey McKitrick
- Suzie McNeil
- Guillaume Francoeur
- Stephan Moccio
- Kevin Parent
- Josh Ramsay
- Red 1
- Hayley Sales
- James Shaw
- Shiloh
- Tim Baker

== See also ==
- List of artists who reached number one on the Canadian Hot 100
- List of Canadian Hot 100 number-one singles of 2010
- Tears Are Not Enough, a similar event in 1985 organized by Northern Lights (Canadian band)
- We Are the World, a similar event in 1985 organized by USA for Africa
