= Troubadour (K'naan album) =

Studio album by K'naan
- Released: February 24, 2009
- Recorded: 2007–2008
- Genres: Canadian hip hop; worldbeat
- Length: 55:43
- Label: A&M/Octone
- Producers: Gerald Eaton; Brian West; Kerry Brothers, Jr.; Bruno Mars

K'naan chronology
The Dusty Foot on the Road (2007)	Troubadour (2009)	More Beautiful Than Silence (2012)

Singles from Troubadour
- 1. "ABCs" Released: November 18, 2008; 2. "Wavin' Flag" Released: March 18, 2009; 3. "Bang Bang" Released: September 2, 2010

Troubadour is the second studio album by Somali-Canadian hip hop artist K'naan, released February 24, 2009. The album features performances by Kirk Hammett, Chubb Rock, Chali 2na, Mos Def, Damian Marley, and Adam Levine. Production was completed by Track and Field, a team composed of R&B artists Gerald Eaton and Brian West.

The album contains songs produced by Bruno Mars, Philip Lawrence, and Ari Levine, before they became The Smeezingtons, ("Wavin Flag" and "Bang Bang") and also after ("Wavin' Flag" remixes).

== Critical reception ==
Professional ratings
Aggregate scores
Source	Rating
Metacritic	74/100
Review scores
Source	Rating
Allmusic	3.5/5 stars
Billboard	(positive)
Blender	3.5/5 stars
Boston Globe	(positive)
Robert Christgau	(A−)
Entertainment Weekly	(B)
The New York Times	(positive)
Pitchfork	6.5/10
PopMatters	8/10
Rolling Stone	3/5 stars

K'naan's second album has received generally positive reviews, compiling an average score of 74 on Metacritic. Billboard described it as "socially alert and frequently brilliant". David Jeffries of Allmusic called Troubadour a "rewarding, often eye-opening spectacle", praising the selections for the guest artists and referring to K'naan as "ridiculously talented". The album was shortlisted for the 2009 Polaris Music Prize. About.com named Troubadour one of the best Rap Albums of 2009. Troubadour was also included in PopMatters' list of top 60 albums of 2009, at a respectable 43rd position. The album fetched K'naan three Juno Award nominations and he ultimately won Juno artist of the year. 'The Independent gave it a perfect 10 out of 10 rating.

== Singles ==
- "ABCs" was released as the album's first single. It peaked at #75 on the Canadian Singles Chart.
- "Wavin' Flag" was released as the album's second single (first in UK). The single was later remixed and used for the 2010 FIFA World Cup. It is his most successful single to date. It charted within the Top 5 in the UK, Netherlands, Norway, Italy, Ireland, France, Canada, Scotland, Spain, as well as others.
- A new version of "Bang Bang" was released as the album's third and final single featuring Adam Levine of Maroon 5. It peaked at #33 on the UK R&B Chart.
- A remix of "Wavin' Flag (Celebration Mix)" featuring will.i.am & David Guetta was also used to promote the World Cup as well as his album; a music video was also made for the remix. The video also featured will.i.am and David Guetta.

=== Promo singles ===
- "Dreamer" was released as the album's first promotional single.
- "Somalia" was released as the album's second promotional single.
- "I Come Prepared" was released as the album's third promotional single.
- "If Rap Gets Jealous" was released as the album's fourth and final promotional single.

== Licensed songs ==
"ABCs" is used in the video game Madden 09 by EA Sports and the 2009 film The Trotsky, while "Dreamer" is used in promotions for the NFL Draft on NFL.com, and was used by ESPN during the national broadcast of the UConn-Kentucky men's basketball game on December 9, 2009. "I Come Prepared" is used in the video game Fight Night Round 4, also by EA Sports. "Wavin' Flag" is used in the video game NBA 2K10, which is a 2K Sports video game. Coca-Cola announced that a remixed version of "Wavin' Flag" would be the official anthem of the 2010 FIFA World Cup. This version also appears in Konami's PES 2010. "Take a Minute" is used in Dane Tudor's award-winning part of the ski movie Everyday is a Saturday by Poor Boyz Productions. "Bang Bang" was featured in the television series Grey's Anatomy and the 2010 feature film The Karate Kid.

== Track listing ==
No.	Title	Length
1.	"T.I.A."	3:38
2.	"ABCs" (featuring Chubb Rock)	3:09
3.	"Dreamer"	4:32
4.	"I Come Prepared" (featuring Damian Marley)	4:08
5.	"Bang Bang" (featuring Adam Levine of Maroon 5)	3:06
6.	"If Rap Gets Jealous" (featuring Kirk Hammett of Metallica)	3:39
7.	"Wavin' Flag"	3:40
8.	"Somalia"	3:33
9.	"America" (featuring Mos Def & Chali 2na)	4:45
10.	"Fatima"	5:01
11.	"Fire in Freetown"	4:36
12.	"Take a Minute"	4:06
13.	"15 Minutes Away"	4:56
14.	"People Like Me"	6:16

=== Bonus tracks ===
Amazon.com Exclusive
No.	Title	Length
15.	"Wavin' Flag (Celebration Mix)" (featuring will.i.am of The Black Eyed Peas & David Guetta)	3:30
16.	"Wavin' Flag (Coca-Cola Celebration Mix)"	3:32
17.	"Wavin' Flag (Coca-Cola Celebration Spanish Mix)" (featuring David Bisbal)	3:52
18.	"Biscuit"	3:49

Champion Edition
No.	Title	Length
15.	"Does It Really Matter"	3:54
16.	"Wavin' Flag (Coca-Cola Celebration Mix)"	3:32

Champion Edition (UK Edition)
No.	Title	Length
15.	"Does It Really Matter"	3:54
16.	"Wavin' Flag (Coca-Cola Celebration Mix)"	3:32
17.	"Wavin' Flag (Celebration Mix)" (featuring will.i.am of The Black Eyed Peas & David Guetta)	3:30

Champion Edition (Japan Edition)
No.	Title	Length
15.	"Does It Really Matter"	3:54
16.	"Wavin' Flag (Coca-Cola Celebration Mix)"	3:32
17.	"Wavin' Flag (Celebration Mix)" (featuring Ai)	3:38
18.	"Wavin' Flag" (featuring will.i.am of The Black Eyed Peas & David Guetta)	3:29

Sample credits

- "T.I.A." features a sample "Simmer Down" By The Wailers.
- "ABCs" contains a sample from "Kasalefkut Hulu" written by Mulatu Astatke.
- "Dreamer" contains a sample from "Tey Gedyeleshem" written by Alemayehu Eshete.
- "I Come Prepared" contains a sample from "Shellela" Getatchew Mekurya.
- "Somalia" contains a sample from "Yene Mastawesha" written by Tilahun Gessesse.
- "America" contains a sample from "Lantchi" written by Tilahun Gessesse.
- "15 Minutes Away" contains a sample from "Yene Felagote" by Tilahun Gessesse.

== Chart positions ==
In the US, the album sold over 15,000 copies in its first week of release and debuted at #32 on the Billboard 200. The album has sold approximately 82,000 copies in the US as of August 2010. Only the 'champion edition' was released in the United Kingdom on July 16, and charted on the UK R&B Chart at a peak of 22.

Chart (2009–2010)	Peak position
US Billboard 200	32
US Billboard Top R&B/Hip-Hop Albums	33
US Billboard Top Rap Albums	12
Canadian Albums Chart	7
Japanese Albums Chart	57
Mexican Albums Chart	67
South African Albums Chart	20
UK R&B Chart	22
