= More Beautiful Than Silence =

EP by K'naan
- Released: January 31, 2012
- Genre: Alternative hip-hop
- Label: A&M/Octone

K'naan chronology
Troubadour (2009)	More Beautiful Than Silence (2012)	Country, God or the Girl (2012)

Professional ratings
Aggregate scores
Source	Rating
Metacritic	70/100
Review scores
Source	Rating
Consequence of Sound	3.5/5 stars
HipHopDX	4/5 stars

More Beautiful Than Silence is an EP by Canadian rapper K'naan, released on January 31, 2012.

== Track listing ==
No.	Title	Length
1.	"Is Anybody Out There?" (featuring Nelly Furtado)	3:58
2.	"Nothing to Lose" (featuring Nas)	3:57
3.	"More Beautiful Than Silence"	3:52
4.	"Better"	3:16
5.	"Coming to America"	4:02
