= The Dusty Foot on the Road =

Live album by K'naan
- Released: June 25, 2007
- Recorded: 2005–2007
- Genre: Canadian hip hop, folk
- Label: Wrasse

K'naan chronology
The Dusty Foot Philosopher (2005)	The Dusty Foot on the Road (2007)	Troubadour (2009)

Professional ratings
Review scores
Source	Rating
Allmusic	4/5 stars
The Guardian	4/5 stars

The Dusty Foot on the Road is a live album by Somali-Canadian rapper K'naan, released June 25, 2007 on Wrasse Records.

== Track listing ==
No.	Title	Length
1.	"Wash It Down (New York)"	2:42
2.	"The African Way (New York)"	4:44
3.	"What's Hardcore? (Paris)"	2:51
4.	"In the Beginning (New York)"	3:16
5.	"Smile (Amsterdam)"	4:08
6.	"Strugglin' (Edmonton)"	3:38
7.	"Be Free (London)"	3:52
8.	"Until the Lion Learns to Speak (London)"	2:14
9.	"Voices in My Head (Djibouti)"	2:53
10.	"Is It a Myth? (Djibouti)"	3:33
11.	"My God (New York)" (featuring Mos Def)	4:51
12.	"By the End of the Day (Djibouti)"	2:11
13.	"Soobax (Bristol)"	4:24
