= Wavin' Flag =

2009 single by K'naan

Single by K'naan

from the album Troubadour
- Released: 18 March 2009
- Recorded: June 2008
- Genre: World; reggae fusion
- Length: 3:41
- Label: A&M Octone
- Songwriter: Keinan Abdi Warsame
- Producers: Kerry Brothers Jr.; Bruno Mars

K'naan singles chronology
"ABCs" (2008)	"Wavin' Flag" (2009)	"Stop for a Minute" (2010)

Audio video
- "Wavin' Flag" on YouTube

"Wavin' Flag" is a song by Somali-Canadian artist K'naan from his album Troubadour (2009). The song was originally written for Somalia and aspirations of its people for freedom. The original single was a hit in Canada and reached number two on the Canadian Hot 100 as the second official single from the album, after the single "ABCs", a minor hit. After an earthquake in Haiti in 2010, a remake of the song by an ad hoc supergroup of Canadian artists, credited as Young Artists for Haiti, became a charity single in Canada, reaching number one on the Canadian Hot 100 in its own right.

The song became a global hit when it was chosen as Coca-Cola's promotional anthem for the 2010 FIFA World Cup, hosted by South Africa. This amended international version with additional lyrics reached the top ten in more than twenty different charts around the world. The English version was released as "Wavin' Flag (Celebration Mix)" by K'naan to differentiate it from the original Canadian hit or from the Canadian Haiti charity hit. The Spanish cover featuring David Bisbal became very popular. A version of the song featuring will.i.am and David Guetta was targeted for international markets. Many other bilingual and country-specific versions were released, such as the Brazilian version featuring Skank singing in Portuguese. The song is also featured on the soundtrack of the game NBA 2K10.

In 2012, K'naan published a children's book, When I Get Older: The Story Behind Wavin' Flag, about the song and its history.

== Original single ==
The original single of "Wavin' Flag" appeared originally on his album Troubadour. The single reached number two on the Canadian Hot 100 as the second official single from the album, which was produced by Kerry Brothers Jr. and Bruno Mars. K'naan first performed the song acoustically live on Q TV, where he gave viewers a preview of Troubadour prior to its release. The lyrics of the original version are about the struggle of refugees displaced by war, with references to K'naan's native Somalia, in comparison to the later version used for the World Cup, where the lyrics were rewritten in a more celebratory tone.

=== Charts ===
Chart performance for "Wavin' Flag" by K'naan
Chart (2010)	Peak position
Canada (Canadian Hot 100)	2
Japan Hot 100 (Billboard Japan)	24

Year-end chart performance for "Wavin' Flag" by K'naan
Chart (2010)	Peak position
Canada (Canadian Hot 100)	21

== Young Artists for Haiti ==
"Wavin' Flag"

Single by Young Artists for Haiti
- Released: 12 March 2010
- Recorded: 18 February 2010
- Studio: The Warehouse Studio (Vancouver, BC)
- Genre: Pop; hip hop
- Length: 3:55
- Label: Universal Music Canada
- Songwriter: K'naan
- Producer: Bob Ezrin

Music video
- "Wavin' Flag" by Young Artists For Haiti on YouTube

In 2010, the song was remade by a supergroup of Canadian artists, credited as Young Artists for Haiti, as a charity single to benefit relief efforts following the 2010 Haiti earthquake. The charity single was spearheaded by producer Bob Ezrin, engineered by Mike Fraser and was reworked to include specific lyrics for Haiti, including a rap solo by Drake. It was released on 12 March 2010 with proceeds going to Free the Children, War Child Canada and World Vision Canada. This new version went straight to number one on the Canadian charts.

Participating soloists included K'naan, Nelly Furtado, Sam Roberts, Avril Lavigne, Pierre Bouvier, Tyler Connolly, Kardinal Offishall, Jully Black, Lights, Deryck Whibley, Serena Ryder, Jacob Hoggard, Emily Haines, Hawksley Workman, Drake, Chin Injeti, Ima, Pierre Lapointe, Elisapie Isaac, Esthero, Corb Lund, Fefe Dobson, Nikki Yanofsky, Matt Mays, Justin Nozuka, and Justin Bieber. Performing the chorus were Arkells, Lamar Ashe, Broken Social Scene, Torquil Campbell, Canadian Tenors, Aion Clarke, City and Colour, Tom Cochrane, Jim Cuddy, Jim Creeggan, Kathleen Edwards, Dave Faber, Jessie Farrell, Colin James, Pat Kordyback, Brandon Lehti, Colin MacDonald, Jay Malinowski, Stacey McKitrick, Suzie McNeil, Stephan Moccio, Kevin Parent, Josh Ramsay, Red 1, Hayley Sales, James Shaw, Shiloh and Tim Baker. Students from Vancouver high schools Lord Byng Secondary and Magee Secondary also voluntarily participated by playing together as an orchestra. A music video was shot for the charity single at The Warehouse Studio in Vancouver, British Columbia, Canada. In March 2011, the single won the Juno award for Single of the Year.

=== Track listing ===
Digital download
No.	Title	Length
1.	"Wavin' Flag"	3:55

Live At Juno Awards 2010 digital download
No.	Title	Length
1.	"Wavin' Flag" (Live At Juno Awards 2010) (with K'naan)	5:20

=== Charts ===
==== Weekly charts ====
Weekly chart performance for "Wavin' Flag" by Young Artists for Haiti
Chart (2010)	Peak position
Canada (Canadian Hot 100)	1
UK Singles (Official Charts)	89

==== Year-end charts ====
Year-end chart performance for "Wavin' Flag" by Young Artists for Haiti
Chart (2010)	Position
Canada (Canadian Hot 100)	19

=== Certifications ===
Certifications for "Wavin' Flag" by Young Artists for Haiti
Region	Certification	Certified units/sales
Canada (Music Canada)	3× Platinum	120,000^{*}
^{*} Sales figures based on certification alone.

== Coca-Cola Celebration Mix ==
"Wavin' Flag" (Celebration Mix)

Single by K'naan

from the album Troubadour: Champion Edition
- Released: 30 April 2010
- Recorded: 2009
- Genre: World; reggae fusion; pop rock
- Length: 3:38
- Label: Universal
- Songwriters: K'naan; Bruno Mars; Philip Lawrence; Jean Daval
- Producer: The Smeezingtons

K'naan singles chronology
"Stop for a Minute" (2010)	"Wavin' Flag" (Celebration Mix) (2010)	"Each Tear" (2010)

Music video
- "Wavin' Flag" (Celebration Mix) on YouTube

In 2010, a remix of the song, titled the "Celebration Mix", was recorded for use as Coca-Cola's promotional anthem for the 2010 FIFA World Cup, hosted by South Africa. This version reached number one in Germany, Switzerland and Austria and number two in Italy, the United Kingdom, and Ireland.

Coca-Cola described the remix as "inspired by the joyous dance celebrations familiar to Africa." Coca-Cola integrated its jingle, well known from previous Coca-Cola commercials, into the mix, generating a direct association between the remixed song and the brand. New lyrics related to football were added, "let's rejoice in the Beautiful Game", and "see the champions take the field." A music video shows people playing the game, and goal celebrations. The song was used throughout the tournament, and featured on all worldwide versions of the Coca-Cola campaign. The song was also played at events for the FIFA World Cup Trophy Tour, where K'naan performed this version live for the first time, and featured on the online digital platform for the World Cup. He also performed at the World Cup kick-off concert. The music video for the remix includes a guest appearance by Damian Marley. The remix video was recorded in Estadio Centenario in Montevideo, the site of the first 1930 FIFA World Cup Final. The remix version appears on the Champion Edition of Troubadour.

Although the remix features many elements of the original song, it includes most notably a new pre-chorus that sets the uplifting, unified tone of the 2010 FIFA World Cup, turning the song into one that is more open, more inviting and more celebratory. "I'm so proud of this [new] version," K'naan told Billboard.Biz. The new version also removes many of the darker lyrics of the original song. According to Billboard, Coca-Cola "loved the song but noted that lyrical references to 'a violent prone, poor people zone' and people 'struggling, fighting to eat' didn't fit the campaign's themes".

We took something like 50 drums and did this crazy mix for it. It's about the one time that we all get together and the world forgets its conflict and its problems and we focus on this unity and celebration. That moment is connected now to 'Wavin' Flag.'

=== Charts ===
==== Weekly charts ====
Weekly chart performance for "Wavin' Flag" (Celebration Mix) by K'naan
Chart (2010)	Peak position
Australia (ARIA)	69
Austria (Ö3 Austria Top 40)	1
Belgium (Ultratop 50 Flanders)	14
Belgium (Ultratop 50 Wallonia)	10
Czech Republic Airplay (ČNS IFPI)	3
Czech Republic Singles Digital (ČNS IFPI)	76
Denmark (Tracklisten)	16
European Hot 100 Singles	1
France (SNEP)	2
Germany (GfK)	1
Hungary (Single Top 40)	7
Ireland (IRMA)	2
Israel International Airplay (Media Forest)	4
Italy (FIMI)	2
Japan Hot 100 (Billboard Japan)	7
Luxembourg Digital Songs (Billboard)	1
Mexico Anglo (Monitor Latino)	8
Netherlands (Dutch Top 40)	2
Netherlands (Single Top 100)	3
Norway (VG-lista)	5
Scottish Singles Sales (Official Charts)	1
Slovakia Airplay (ČNS IFPI)	4
Spain (Promusicae)	2
Spanish Airplay Chart	6
Switzerland (Schweizer Hitparade)	1
Sweden (Sverigetopplistan)	9
UK Singles (Official Charts)	2
UK Hip Hop/R&B (Official Charts)	1
US Billboard Hot 100	82

==== Year-end charts ====
Year-end chart performance for "Wavin' Flag" (Celebration Mix) by K'naan
Chart (2010)	Position
Austria (Ö3 Austria Top 40)	4
Belgium (Ultratop Flanders)	74
Belgium (Ultratop Wallonia)	74
Brazil (Crowley)	92
Germany (Official German Charts)	6
Italy (FIMI)	34
Japan Adult Contemporary (Billboard Japan)	69
Netherlands (Dutch Top 40)	43
Netherlands (Single Top 100)	11
Sweden (Sverigetopplistan)	56
Switzerland (Schweizer Hitparade)	4
UK Singles (OCC)	43

== Celebration Mix ==
"Wavin' Flag" (Celebration Mix)

Single by K'naan featuring will.i.am and David Guetta

from the album Troubadour: Champion Edition
- Released: 14 May 2010
- Genre: Hip house; reggae fusion
- Label: Universal; A&M
- Producers: Afrojack; David Guetta; Kerry "Krucial" Brothers; The Smeezingtons; will.i.am

K'naan singles chronology
"Each Tear" (2010)	"Wavin' Flag" (Celebration Mix) (2010)	"Bang Bang" (2010)

will.i.am singles chronology
"OMG" (2010)	"Wavin' Flag" (Celebration Mix) (2010)	"I'm in the House" (2010)

A remix of "Wavin' Flag", which features French music producer David Guetta and American rapper, producer and the Black Eyed Peas frontman will.i.am, was made for international release outside of Canada. will.i.am's solo parts were exclusively written for the international version, and for the K'naan part, some of the lyrics were amended. His version of the song was mixed by hit engineer Dylan "3-D" Dresdow. This version was later released as the B-side to the Celebration Mix. The maxi-single CD also included the Spanish adaptation with the Spanish language verses written by Rafael Vergara and interpreted by David Bisbal.

The maxi single release track list:

No.	Title	Writer(s)	Producer(s)	Length
1.	"Wavin' Flag" (Celebration Mix)		The Smeezingtons	3:33
2.	"Wavin' Flag" (Celebration Mix; featuring will.i.am and David Guetta)	David Guetta; N. Van De Wall; W. Adams	Afrojack; David Guetta; Kerry "Krucial" Brothers; The Smeezingtons; will.i.am	3:30
3.	"Wavin' Flag" (Spanish Celebration Mix; featuring David Bisbal)		The Smeezingtons	3:52
4.	"Wavin' Flag" (album version)		Bruno Mars; Kerry "Krucial" Brothers	3:41

The version featuring will.i.am and David Guetta was released as the single B-side to "Wavin' Flag" (Celebration Mix) single release in Europe.

A separate music video was made for this version, with the artists performing in front of a large black flag. However some scenes were used from the original Canadian music video and from K'naan's "Wavin' Flag" (The Celebration Mix) music video intertwined with visuals of the new video.

=== Bilingual versions ===
Many bilingual versions of the Celebration Mix have been made, for use in each of their respective countries. The initial bilingual version was recorded by K'naan and Spanish singer David Bisbal, sung in both English and Spanish, and targeting all Spanish-speaking markets, including Spain, Mexico, Central and South America. This version was entitled the "Spanish Celebration Mix", and was officially made available for digital download in February 2010. As a part of the promotion, a music video of the Spanish Celebration Mix was filmed and released for the song. Another version sung in both English and Arabic, featuring Nancy Ajram, a multi-platinum Lebanese singer and spokesperson for Coca-Cola Middle East, was released in all Middle Eastern Countries. This version, entitled the "Arabic Celebration Mix", also had a music video recorded for it. Scenes were filmed in Denmark, Portugal, Brazil, Lebanon and South Africa. A Chinese version, featuring Jacky Cheung and Jane Zhang, reached #1 on China Music Chart, and a Thai version, featuring Tattoo Colour, charted at #3 there.

Versions released under Coca-Cola sponsorship for 2010 FIFA World Cup:

- Arab world: "Wavin' Flag/Shagga' Bi Alamak" by K'naan and Nancy Ajram
- Brazil: "Comemorar" by K'naan and Skank
- Greater China: "Wavin' Flag" (Chinese: 旗开得胜) by K'naan Jacky Cheung and Jane Zhang
- France: "Wavin' Flag " by K'naan and Féfé
- Greece: "Wavin' Flag" by K'naan and Professional Sinnerz feat. Komis X
- Indonesia: "Wavin' Flag (Semangat Berkibar)" by K'naan and Ipang
- Japan: "Wavin' Flag" (Japanese: ウェイヴィン・フラッグ) by K'naan and Ai
- Nigeria: "Wavin' Flag (Naija Remix)" by K'naan and Banky W. & M.I.(Jude Abaga).
- Spain/Latin America: "Wavin' Flag (Bandera de Libertad)" by K'naan and David Bisbal.
- Thailand: "Wavin' Flag" by K'naan and Tattoo Colour.

Unofficial releases collaborate with FIFA 2010 Coca-Cola campaign theme

- Caribbean: "Wavin' Flag" (DJ Power Remix) by K'naan and Machel Montano
- Haiti: "Wavin' Flag" by K'naan and Mikaben.
- Hungary: "Nálunk van a labda" - anchors and sport reporters of Magyar Televízió
- India: (In Hindi) "Wavin' Flag" by K'naan and Jasim
- Somalia: "Wavin Flag" by K'naan Feat. Gulled Ahmed
- Italy: "Wavin' Flag" by K'naan ft. Mr. Blaza and MagicEmy
- Mongolia: "Wavin' Flag" - P.Bayartsengel, D.Anu, E.Solongo and E.Soyombo.
- Russia: "Wavin' Flag" by K'naan and ST1M.
- Sri Lanka: "Wavin' Flag/Ekama Irak Yata" by K'naan, remixed by Pradeep
- Vietnam: "Wavin' Flag" by K'naan and Phương Vy.
- Denmark: "Bare kom an" by Anne Mortensen, Lasse Jakobsen, Anders Andersen, Dennis Schultz & Erik Bruun.

==== Year-end charts ====
Year-end chart performance for "Wavin' Flag" by K'naan and various artists
Chart (2010)	Position
Austrian Singles Chart	4
Canadian Hot 100	21
Dutch Singles Chart	11
European Hot 100 Singles	10
French Singles Chart	8
German Singles Chart	6
Hungarian Airplay Chart	86
Italian Singles Chart	34
Swiss Singles Chart	4
Spanish Singles Chart	17
UK Singles (OCC)	36

== Certifications ==
Certifications for "Wavin' Flag" by K'naan
Region	Certification	Certified units/sales
Brazil (Pro-Música Brasil)	Platinum	60,000^{‡}
Canada (Music Canada)	3× Platinum	120,000^{*}
Denmark (IFPI Danmark)	Gold	45,000^{‡}
Germany (BVMI)	3× Gold	450,000^{‡}
Italy (FIMI)	Platinum	30,000^{‡}
Spain (Promusicae)	Gold	50,000^{‡}
Spain (Promusicae) Spanish Version	Platinum	40,000^{*}
Switzerland (IFPI Switzerland)	2× Platinum	60,000^{^}
United Kingdom (BPI)	Platinum	600,000^{‡}
^{*} Sales figures based on certification alone.^{^} Shipments figures based on certification alone.^{‡} Sales+streaming figures based on certification alone.

== Release history ==
Release dates and formats for "Wavin' Flag"
Region	Date	Format	Label(s)	Ref.
United States	20 July 2009	Mainstream airplay	Interscope	
