= George Brown (governor of Bombay) =

British Governor of Bombay

The Honourable George Brown

Governor of Bombay
- In office 1811–1812
- Preceded by: Jonathan Duncan
- Succeeded by: Sir Evan Nepean

Personal details
- Born: 15 December 1775
- Died: 1 May 1819 (aged 43) Baker Street, London
- Resting place: Streatham
- Spouse: Hannah Roberts (m. 1811)
- Children: 6
- Occupation: East India Company official

George Brown (15 December 1775 – 1 May 1819) was an East India Company civil servant and the British governor of Bombay from 11 August 1811 to 12 August 1812. Acting temporarily in the role after the death in office of Jonathan Duncan, he was replaced by Sir Evan Nepean. His time in office included work combatting Indian infanticide and communication with Muhammad Ali of Egypt on the Ottoman–Wahhabi war.

== Early life ==
George Brown was born on 15 December 1775, the son of Thomas Brown, an East Indies merchant, and Hannah née Heptinstall. He was their sixth child.

== Career ==
Brown became an employee of the East India Company in the Bombay Civil Service, working in India as a writer (clerk) as early as 2 April 1789, when he had a covenant created. He returned to Britain on furlough in early 1808 and visited his family at Winifred House in Bath, Somerset.

Brown was appointed Third Member of the Bombay Council while in Britain on 18 January 1811. He sailed to India on board the merchant ship Northampton on 11 March, and took his seat in Bombay on 23 July.

With Brown serving as Senior Member of Council, on 11 August the Governor of Bombay, Jonathan Duncan, died in office. As the next-most senior official, Brown assumed post to officiate as governor until a new appointee could be sent out. Brown continued the policy Duncan had begun of combatting infanticide among the Indian population, supporting Captain James Rivett-Carnac in his expedition against Jam Jasaji Lakhaji, ruler of Nawanagar State.

In November the same year, Brown refused a request for military aid from Muhammad Ali of Egypt, who was fighting the Ottoman–Wahhabi war in which Britain was neutral. By July 1812 setbacks in his campaign against the Wahhabis led Ali to again request help from Brown, but this was once more refused, although Brown allowed Ali's agent to purchase military supplies to return with. Brown continued in office until Sir Evan Nepean arrived from England to replace him on 12 August 1812. Brown remained on the council, by 1814 still taking precedent as Third Member of Council, behind Nepean and Sir Miles Nightingall. During this time he served as a vice-president of the Bombay Bible Society. He resigned from the Bombay Council on 7 September 1817.

== Personal life ==
While in Britain on furlough in 1808 Brown met and debated marriage to Ellen Sneade, however she was resolutely engaged to another. Despite Brown being presented by his family as a better prospect due to his position in India, nothing came of it. Instead he married Hannah Roberts of Grittleton House on 16 February 1811, in Grittleton, Wiltshire. She travelled with him to India alongside his niece, Hannah Brown. Arrived in India, Brown organised the marriage of Hannah Brown to Captain Monier Williams, with their subsequent children including Sir Monier Monier-Williams. Brown's wife became the patroness of the female branch of the Bombay Bible Society. Together they had one son and five daughters.

Having returned again to Britain, Brown died in his house in Baker Street, London, on 1 May 1819. He was buried in Streatham. His wife Hannah greatly outlived him, dying aged 88 on 12 February 1876.

== Citations ==
Political offices
Preceded by Jonathan Duncan	Governor of Bombay; 1811–1812	Succeeded by Sir Evan Nepean, Bt.
