= K'naan =

Somali-Canadian rapper (born 1978)

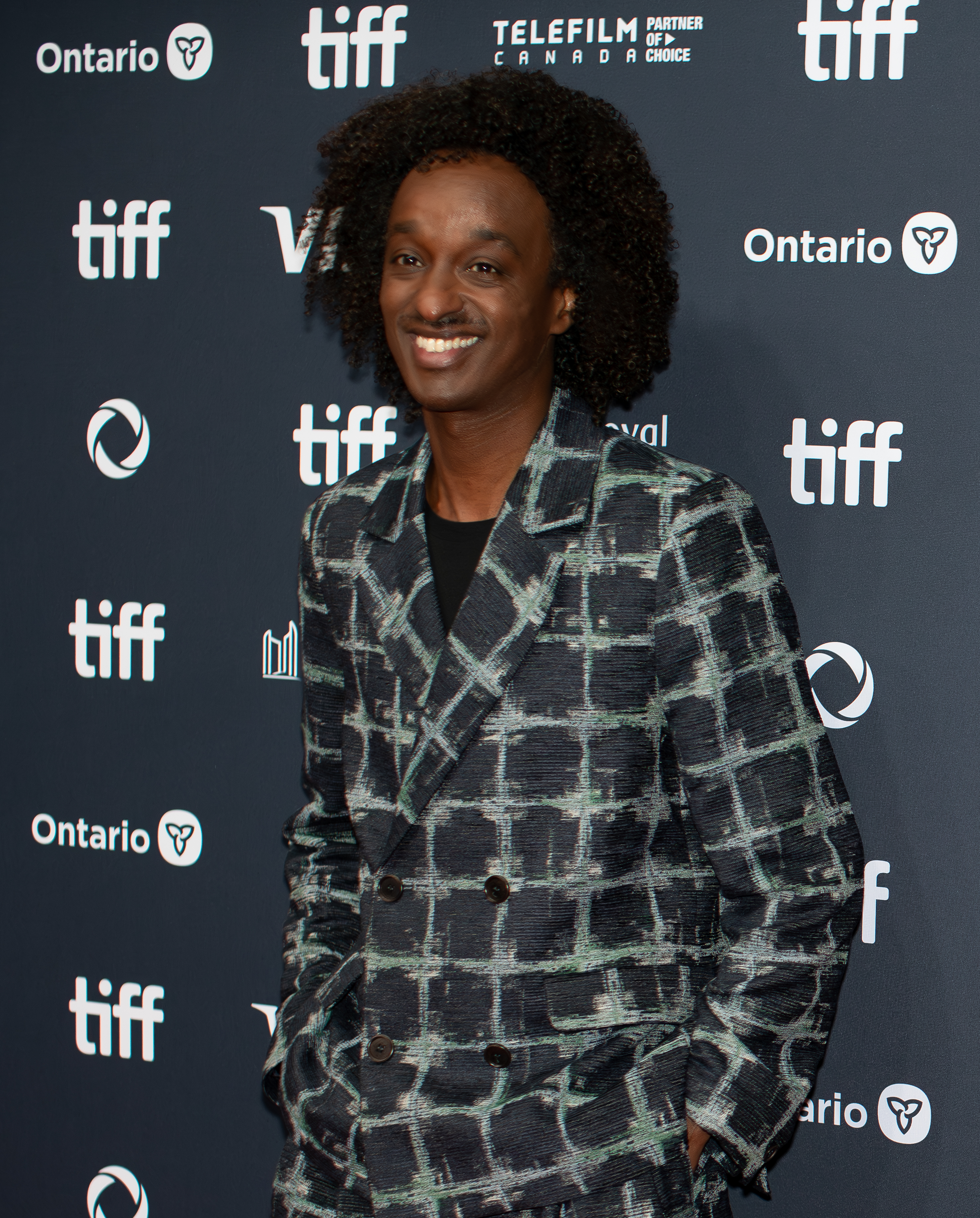
- K'naan in 2024

Background information
- Also known as: K'naan Warsame; Keinaan; Keinan A
- Born: Keinan Abdi Warsame; 1 February 1978 (age 48); Mogadishu, Banaadir, Somalia
- Origin: Toronto, Ontario, Canada
- Genres: Alternative hip hop; world; reggae fusion; spoken word
- Occupations: Rapper; singer; songwriter; record producer; poet; film director
- Instruments: Vocals; piano; guitar; percussion; bass
- Years active: 2000–present
- Label: A&M Octone
- Website: knaan.com

Keinan Abdi Warsame (Somali: Keynaan Cabdi Warsame; born 1 February 1978), known professionally as K'naan (/ˈkeɪnɑːn/ KAY-nahn), is a Somali-Canadian rapper, singer-songwriter and filmmaker. He rose to international fame after releasing the single "Wavin' Flag", which was chosen as Coca-Cola's promotional anthem for the 2010 FIFA World Cup. Besides hip hop, K'naan's sound is influenced by elements of Somali music and world music. A Grammy Award-winning artist and FIPRESCI Prize-winning director, he is also involved in various philanthropic initiatives.

== Early life ==
K'naan was born 1 February 1978 in Mogadishu, situated in the southeastern Banaadir province of Somalia. K'naan's family was from an artistic background. His grandfather was a famous poet, and his aunt Magool was a renowned singer. His name, Keynaan (/ˈkeɪnɑːn/), means "traveller" in the Somali language.

K'naan spent his childhood in Mogadishu. His father, Abdi, left earlier when he was still a boy to work as a taxi driver in New York City. K'naan's early years were idyllic and enveloped in poetry and song, with his aunt Magool often singing to him. This changed following the start of the civil war, when at the age of 12, three of his friends were shot by an older adolescent gunman. K'naan also narrowly escaped death one day at his school, when he mistook a grenade that he found in the dirt for a potato and threw it away just before it detonated. These incidents and the general escalation of violence prompted his mother to seek a visa so that the family could join his father in New York. When he was 13, K'naan and his mother and two siblings, older brother Liban and younger sister Sagal, moved to the United States. They stayed in New York for half a year, before relocating to Toronto, Ontario, Canada, where his family still resides.

In his new environment, K'naan began learning English, partly by listening to hip hop albums by artists like Nas and Rakim. Despite the fact that he could not yet speak the language, he taught himself hip-hop and rap diction, copying the lyrics and style phonetically. He then also began rapping. While growing up in Toronto's Rexdale neighbourhood, K'naan lost many friends to murder, suicide, prison, and deportation.

In 2006, K'naan moved back to New York City, where his father still resided.

== Career ==
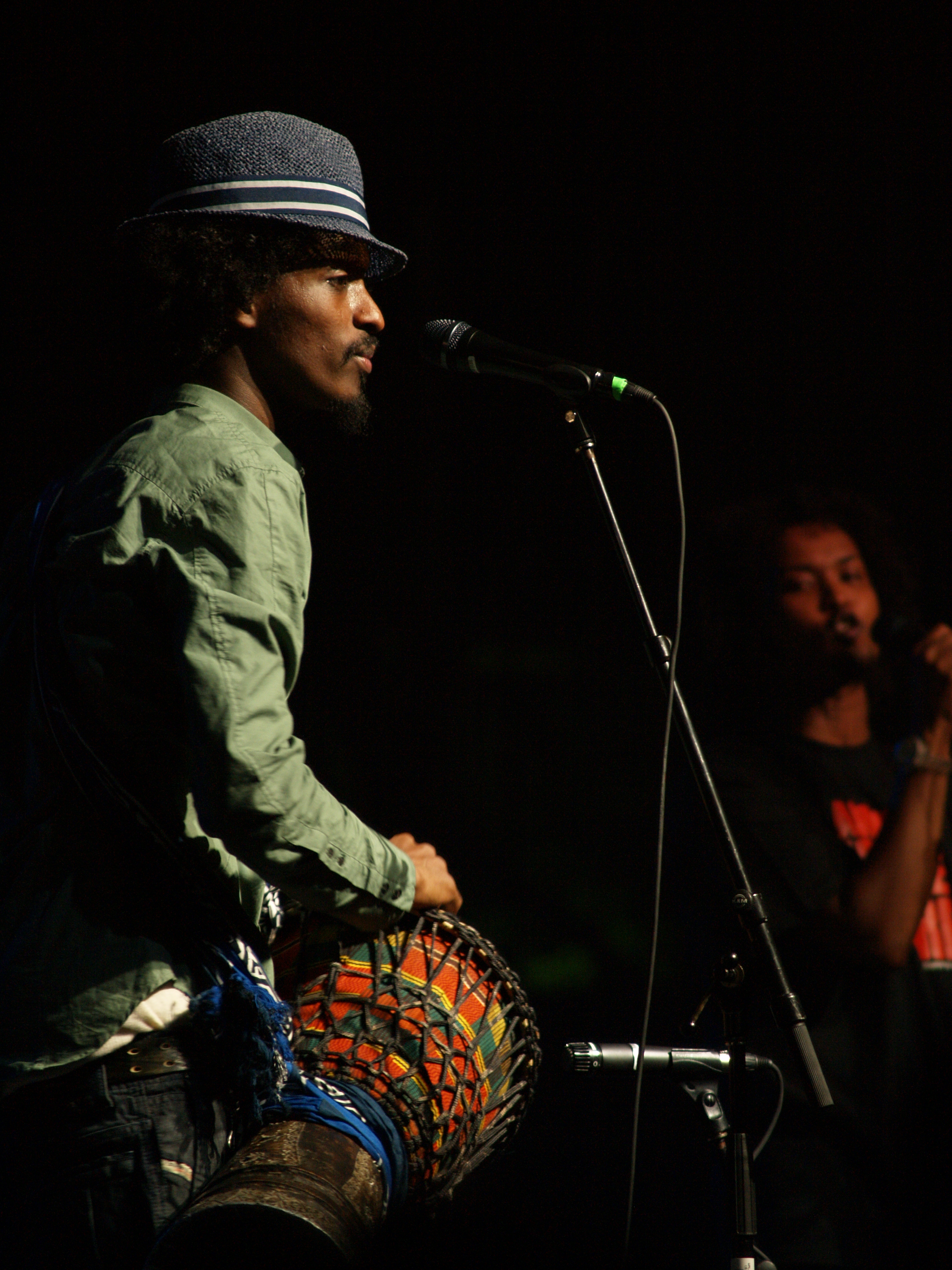
K'naan in 2007

K'naan became a friend and associate of Canadian promoter Sol Guy, who helped him secure a speaking engagement before the United Nations High Commissioner for Refugees in 1999, where K'naan performed a spoken word piece criticizing the UN for its failed peacekeeping missions to Somalia. One of the audience members, Senegalese singer Youssou N'Dour, was so impressed by the young MC's performance and courage that he invited him to contribute to his 2001 album Building Bridges, a project through which K'naan was able to tour the world.

This project led to his work at other UN events, as well as the Montreal Jazz Festival and the Halifax Pop Explosion. It also helped him meet Canadian producer Brian West and Jarvis Church and his Track & Field team in 2002, who produced his debut album The Dusty Foot Philosopher, which was released in 2005 to critical acclaim. In 2006, it won the Juno Award for Rap Recording of the Year, and was nominated for the 2006 Polaris Music Prize. It also won the BBC Radio 3 Award for World Music in the newcomer category for 2007. The Dusty Foot Philosopher was re-released and repackaged as a "Deluxe Edition" featuring new mixes and a bonus DVD in the United States (and various international territories) by the emerging media company and record label iM (Interdependent Media, Inc.) in 2008.

K'naan toured and collaborated with artists like Nelly Furtado, Mos Def, will.i.am, The Roots, Dead Prez, and Pharoahe Monch on tours such as Live 8 and Breedlove Odyssey. He also collaborated with Damian Marley on the "Welcome to Jamrock" touring session.

K'naan released The Dusty Foot on the Road, a collection of recordings made during his world tour on Wrasse Records.

K'naan rose to mainstream popularity by participating in the 2008 BET Awards Cypher. This was his first appearance on American television. His second studio album, Troubadour, was released on 24 February 2009, on A&M/Octone Records, and distributed through Universal Music Group worldwide. The album's first single, "ABC's", was released in late 2008. K'naan's music has featured in several video games such as Madden NFL 09 (with his song "ABC's") and FIFA 06 (with his song "Soobax"). The song "If Rap Gets Jealous", a re-recording of a track of the same name – with different verses – from The Dusty Foot Philosopher, features Metallica lead guitarist Kirk Hammett. K'naan was also the first featured artist on X3, a collaborative project between CBC Radio 3, Exclaim! magazine and aux.tv to promote new Canadian music. In July 2010, he performed a cover of U2's "Stuck in a Moment You Can't Get Out Of" for iHeartRadio. On 24 January 2012, K'naan released a 5-song EP under the title More Beautiful Than Silence including songs such as "Nothing to Lose", "Better", "Is Anybody Out There?". The songs also include collaborations with Nas and Nelly Furtado.

K'naan's 2012 album, Country, God or the Girl, was met with little of the critical acclaim and success that Troubadour received. Unlike Troubadour, which was produced almost entirely by production team Track and Field, Country, God or the Girl featured a wide range of different producers, many of whom work on more mainstream projects. After the release of the album, K'naan published an article in the New York Times explaining and apologizing for the change in his sound. "My lyrics should change, my label's executives said; radio programmers avoid subjects too far from fun and self-absorption," recounts K'naan. "So I began to say yes. Yes to trying out songs with A-list producers. Yes to moving production from Kingston to Los Angeles." In the end, K'naan states "I had not made my Marley or my Dylan, or even my K'naan; I had made an album in which a few genuine songs are all but drowned out by the loud siren of ambition. Fatima had become Mary, and Mohamed, Adam."

In 2012, K'naan published a children's book, When I Get Older: The Story Behind Wavin' Flag.

He is featured along with Howard Shore in the Cosmopolis (2012) soundtrack.

In February 2024, K'naan won his first Grammy Award for a song called "Refugee", which won in the category for Best Song for Social Change.

Mother Mother, his debut film as a director, premiered in the Discovery program at the 2024 Toronto International Film Festival.

== Political involvement ==
K'Naan has remained committed to his Somali roots and continues to be outspoken in the geopolitics of his home country. He is often regarded as a spokesperson for the Toronto Somali community. In 2007, he was invited by Canadian Broadcasting Corporation to reflect on changes in the Somali courts, including the removal of the Islamic Courts Union. K'Naan renounced this act by Somalia and indicated his support for the Islamic Courts Union, pushing back on the Western critiques of Muslim governing systems. Furthermore, he has spoken out against the clan system used in Somalia and particularly its use in immigrant communities in Canada.

K'Naan's engagement with his Somali roots dates back to his first hit "Soobax," which in his native Somali language means "come out." The song critiques the warlords that held power in Somalia's capital, Mogadishu. The song gained popularity in Somalia, Canada and the United States. Additionally, K'Naan goes beyond reflecting on his Somali roots in his lyrics as he often raps in both English and Somali rather than one language. His choice to blend both languages has made him a standout among hip hop artists.

K'Naan's involvement in rap and hip hop in North America has expanded the discussion on both Somali and the Black Diaspora in the West. Both his music and appearances on television and radio shows have grown the conversation on what it means to be Black in Canada. In addition to Black communities that have been residing in the country for over a century there are large Black immigrant communities from the Caribbean and Africa.

Rather than speaking for a larger Black diaspora, K'Naan speaks on his own personal experience including being Somali in Canada. K'Naan continues to be a voice of the Toronto Somali communities.

K'naan's cover of the Bob Dylan song "With God on Our Side" is the closing song on Michael Moore's movie Fahrenheit 11/9.

== Style and influences ==
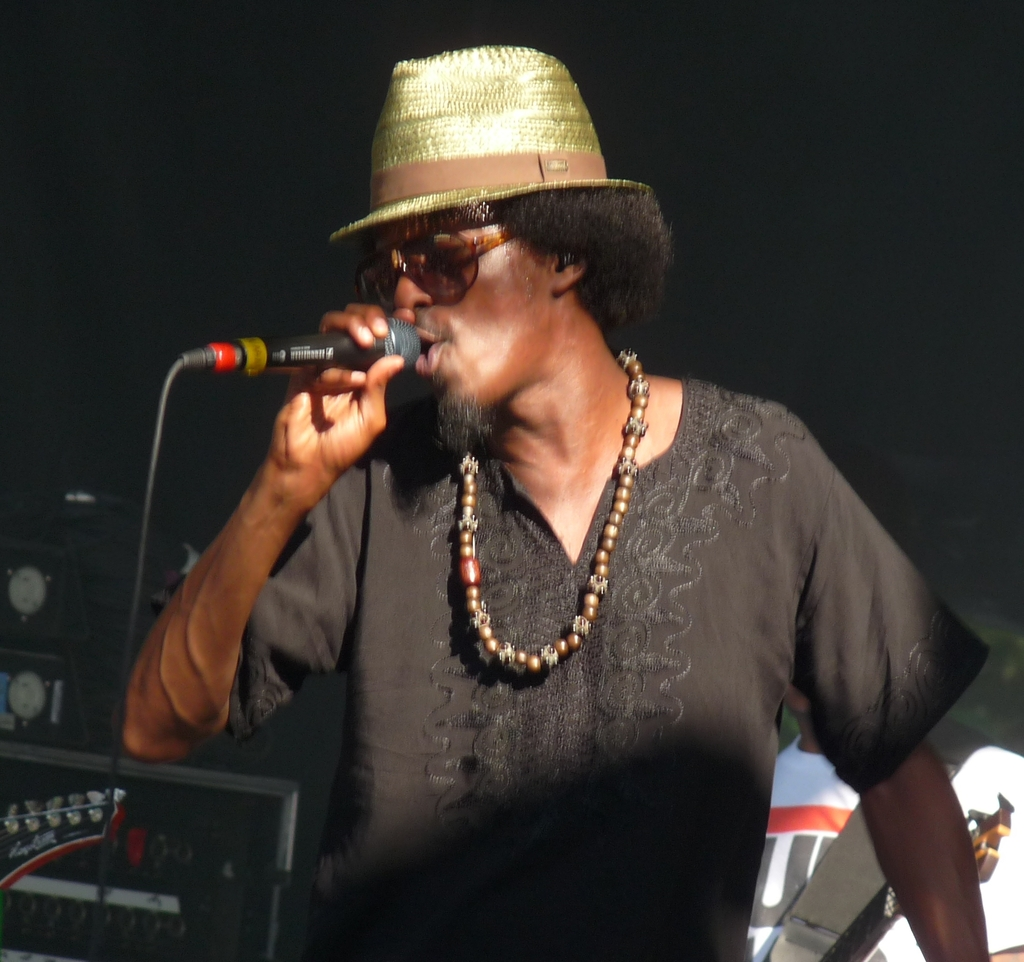
K'naan in 2009

Jim Welte has said K'naan has "a sound that fuses Bob Marley, conscious American hip-hop, and brilliant protest poetry." His voice and style has been compared to Eminem, but his subject matter is very different; according to K'naan, he makes "urgent music with a message", talking about the situation in his homeland of Somalia and calling for an end to violence and bloodshed. He specifically tries to avoid gangsta rap clichés and posturing, saying:

All Somalis know that gangsterism isn't to brag about. The kid that I was growing up with [in Rexdale] would wear baggy [track] suit pants, and a little jacket from Zellers or something, and they'd walk into school, and all the cool kids would be like, 'Ah, man, look at these Somalis. Yo, you're a punk!' And the other kid won't say nothing, but that kid, probably, has killed fifteen people.

This statement was made to explain his position on the world of difference which exists between where he grew up, and the ghettos of the first world. Nonetheless, K'naan denies that he is overtly political, instead explaining that he "[shows] the state of the world [and] if you call it like it is you're being political." His own opinion of his music is that it's a "mix of tradition and [a] kind of articulation of my own life and [..] my past experiences."

K'naan has said that he is influenced by Somali music and the traditional instruments of Somalia. His 2009 album, Troubadour, also draws heavily from Ethiopian sources, particularly Ethio-Jazz by Alemayehu Eshete and Tilahun Gessesse.

K'naan's single "Fatima" is about his childhood friend who was killed in the Somali civil war.

== Notable live performances ==
With a small acoustic band, consisting of Rayzak (back-up vocals), Kierscey Rand (acoustic guitar) and UDOGG-The Funky Drummer (djembe and drums). This style was an essential element of what set K'naan apart from most hip-hop acts. More than that, it reflected K'naan's value of meaningful lyrics over shallow theatrics. One of the last performances of this band was on 16 March 2009, when K'naan rendered four songs from the newly launched album for CBC Radio One's program Q with Jian Ghomeshi, although Rayzak continued to join his subsequent shows and Kierscey Rand made occasional appearances, such as his World Cup Trophy Tour.

Since Troubadour, K'naan has toured almost exclusively with a larger electric ensemble – consisting of drums, bass, electric guitar, and keyboards – and his performances now also feature elaborate lighting. This change in showmanship, along with his collaborations with such high-profile artists as Adam Levine and Mos Def, has helped to shift K'naan more into the mainstream flow of the music industry and has helped him gain exposure to a wider audience.

=== 2010 FIFA World Cup tour ===
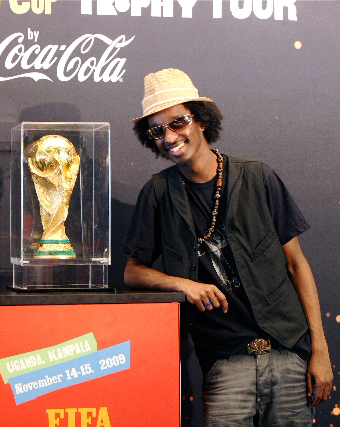
K'naan at the 2010 FIFA World Cup

A remixed version of K'naan's single, "Wavin' Flag", was chosen as Coca-Cola's anthem for the 2010 FIFA World Cup. It was also used in the commercials for the pre-game, which was held in South Africa. Additionally, the track is in the soundtrack for the official EA Sports 2010 FIFA World Cup video game. In December 2009, K'naan performed the song live during the sponsor's FIFA World Cup Trophy Tour, which took him to 86 countries around the world. His performance of "Wavin' Flag" was featured in the Top 10 hits in 11 countries across the world. This also included number one hits in Mexico, Austria, China, Germany, Luxembourg, and Switzerland. In order to appeal to different people around the world, K'naan also recorded the song with various local artists such as David Bisbal, Jacky Cheung, Jane Zhang, Nancy Ajram, and Tattoo Colour.

=== Simon Fraser University Controversy ===
On 21 September 2010, K'naan was scheduled as the headlining act of a student organised concert for World Peace Day which was to benefit girls' education in rural Ghana. K'naan cancelled for reasons that have been reported as relating to finances and quality of the production. Ticket sales were lower than expected, leading to a shortfall in the contractual fee owed to K'naan. His manager stated that, "this is the first time in K'naan's seven-year career that he has pulled out of a performance for such a reason". K'naan announced on his Twitter following the concert "amazing how human beings need a bogeyman. It's even better when they can turn their heroes to foes. SFU, check your own back yard for faults."

=== Coke's 125th anniversary ===
On 8 May 2011, K'naan performed live at Atlanta's Centennial Olympic Park for Coca-Cola's employees in light of Coke's 125th anniversary.

=== "Decade of Difference" Clinton concert ===
On 15 October 2011, at the Hollywood Bowl in Los Angeles, K'naan was one of eight performers at the "Decade of Difference" concert. The concert celebrated former US President Bill Clinton's 65th birthday and the 10-year anniversary of the Clinton Foundation. K'naan was the third performer of the evening, following sets by Stevie Wonder and Kenny Chesney and preceding sets by Juanes, Usher, Lady Gaga, as well as the Edge and Bono of U2. K'naan performed three songs – "Bulletproof Pride," "America," and "Wavin' Flag." Toward the end of "Bulletproof Pride," K'naan surprised the audience by bringing Bono onstage for a duet. K'naan also spoke about his childhood in Somalia and how President Clinton's efforts overseas positively impacted his youth.

== Musical feud ==
In 2005, the Canadian music scene featured a low-key feud between K'naan and k-os, one of the most prominent Canadian hip-hop artists. Following the release of the music video for the song "Soobax", which was shot by K'naan and a film crew in Kenya, k-os released a track "B-Boy Stance" attacking K'naan: "They took cameras to Africa for pictures to rhyme / Over; Oh, yes, the great pretenders [...] Religious entertainers who want to be life savers." Though the feud never became high-profile, with K'naan expressing confusion at the attack and respect for k-os, he nonetheless responded with the mixtape track "Revolutionary Avocado" which argued "You the all-knowing with a beer bottle / Wishing you was Plato and me Aristotle? / ...Suburban negro turned hip-hop hero / Is there a reason he really hates me, though?" – a rebuttal CBC's Matthew McKinnon called "cold-cocking the champ".

== Collaborations ==
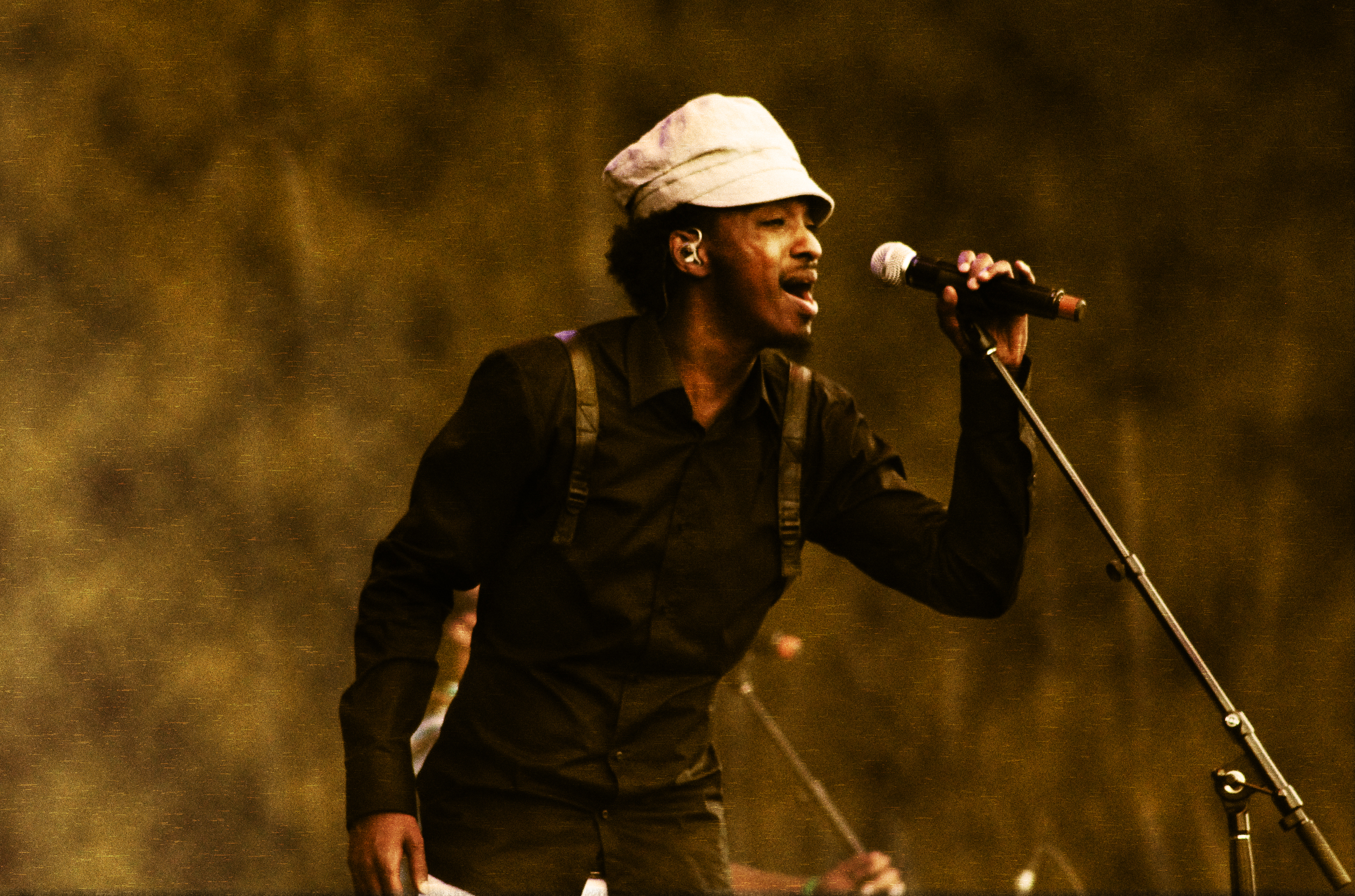
K'naan performing in 2010

- In 2006, he collaborated with Dead Prez's M-1 on the song "'Till We Get There" from the album Confidential.
- In 2008, K'naan collaborated with the Malian duo Amadou & Mariam on the song "Africa" from their album Welcome to Mali.
- In 2009, he collaborated with British rock band Keane on two songs from their EP Night Train including the single "Stop for a Minute", and "Looking Back".
- In 2009, he also collaborated with American rapper Wale on the song "Um'Ricka" from the mixtape Back to the Feature, and on the song "TV in the Radio" from Wale's debut album Attention Deficit.
- In September 2009, K'naan teamed up with J.Period, an L.A.-born DJ/producer, and released The Messengers, a three volume remix project. Each volume pays tribute to one music icon: Fela Kuti, Bob Marley and Bob Dylan. It was released and is hosted online for free at Jperiod.com/knaan.
- K'naan also toured with Jason Mraz during the summer of 2009 for Mraz's Gratitude Cafe Tour. He also toured with Lenny Kravitz on the LLR tour in 2009.
- In 2010, during the Vancouver Olympics, 50 other Canadian musicians and artists came together with K'naan under the collaboration name of Young Artists for Haiti at the Bryan Adams Vancouver studios to produce a charity version of his song "Wavin' Flag". The music video was released 1 March 2010. String students from Lord Byng Secondary and Magee Secondary joined together momentarily and formed an orchestra which accompanied the song. It was released for digital download on 12 March 2010.
- In 2010, K'naan featured on the first unofficial single, "Mask on My Face", from Chin Injeti's album, D'tach.
- In 2010, a remixed bilingual English/Spanish version of "Wavin' Flag" was made under the title "Wavin' Flag (Coca Cola Spanish Celebration Mix)" with Spanish pop artist David Bisbal after the song was chosen as the Coca-Cola anthem for the 2010 FIFA World Cup, to be held in South Africa. K'naan sings the English lyrics and Bisbal the Spanish lyrics. He also featured Banky W. and M.I in the Nigerian version of the song "Wavin' Flag", Nancy Ajram for the Arabic version of the song, féfé for the French version, Skank for the Brazilian version, and will.i.am and David Guetta for the English version of the song. He also featured Ai (singer) in the Japanese version of the song under the title "Wavin' Flag (Coca Cola Japanese Celebration Mix)". He also featured Jacky Cheung and Jane Zhang in the Chinese version of the song, entitled "旗開得勝".
- In 2010, he collaborated with Damian Marley and Nas on the album Distant Relatives, appearing on the songs "Tribes at War" and "Africa Must Wake Up". He also helped come up with the "sound" of certain songs such as “As We Enter”. The album was released on 18 May 2010.
- In 2010, K'naan's song "Wavin' Flag" is featured in the documentary Bouncing Cats by the filmmaker Nabil Elderkin, starring Crazy Legs. The singer also appears in an interview.
- In 2011, K'naan is featured as a guest singer on Simple Plan album Get Your Heart On! on a track called "Summer Paradise".
- In 2011, he is featured with KRS-One on the soundtrack to the film Beat the World on a track called "Hip Hop Nation", produced by Frank Fitzpatrick.
- In 2012, K'naan released a single titled "Nothing to Lose" featuring Nas.
- In 2012, he collaborated with Howard Shore and Don DeLillo in the Cosmopolis soundtrack.
- K'naan also released "Bang, Bang" featuring Adam Levine from Maroon 5 on his album Troubadour.
- In 2017, K'naan performed in a music video titled "Immigrants (We Get The Job Done)" with Residente, Riz MC and Snow Tha Product. The song is part of Lin-Manuel Miranda's The Hamilton Mixtape.
- On 19 September 2021, K'naan was featured on Sharma Boy's song "Waayo Waayo."
- On 20 December 2021, K'naan was featured on Sharma Boy's song "Somalia Somali Baa Leh."

== Personal life ==
K'naan was married to Deka, a pharmacy technician, with whom he has two sons, born in 2005 and 2007. The couple divorced before K'naan started touring for the 2010 FIFA World Cup with Coca-Cola.

=== Sexual assault charge ===
On September 26, 2024, K'naan was charged with sexual assault in a Quebec City court in relation to an incident that allegedly occurred between July 16 and 17, 2010, pleading not guilty. He was specifically accused of sexually assaulting a woman in her 20s in a Quebec City hotel room, when he was performing at the Festival d'été de Québec. The alleged victim, whose identity was protected by a publication ban, filed a complaint with police in 2022. The trial began on March 10, 2026, with testimony from the alleged victim and continued with testimony from K'naan on March 12. On September 9, 2026, the Quebec judge found K'naan not guilty due to both accounts being plausible, meaning there was reasonable doubt to not convict.

== Philanthropy ==
In addition to his artistic career, K'naan has been involved with various philanthropic initiatives. In 2011, he became a co-spokesman with Bono to raise awareness of that year's drought in Eastern Africa. Also teaming up with close associate Sol Guy, K'naan performed various concerts for the cause.

Additionally, K'naan was also active in promoting the Canadian Bill C-393 to help increase medical assistance to countries in Africa. He teamed up with Stephen Lewis, James Orbinski, and Richard Elliott, executive director of the Canadian HIV/AIDS Legal Network, but the bill was not passed by the Senate.

== Awards and nominations ==
- 2006 Juno Awards
  - Rap Recording of the Year for The Dusty Foot Philosopher (Won)
- 2010 Juno Awards
  - Rap Recording of the Year for Troubadour (Nominated)
  - Artist of the Year (Won)
  - Songwriter of the Year (Won)
- 2010 Mobo Awards
  - African Artist of the Year (Won)
- 2011 Juno Awards
  - Single of the Year (Won)
- 2011 SOCAN International Achievement Award
- 2012 MTV Video Music Awards
  - Best Video with a Message for "Is Anybody Out There?" (Nominated)
- 2012 Top 25 Canadian Immigrant Award Winner
- 2014 African Muzik Magazine Awards
  - Best Male Diaspora (Nominated)
- 2017 MTV Video Music Awards
  - Best Fight Against the System for "Immigrants (We Get the Job Done)" (Won)
- 2024 Grammy Awards
  - Best Song for Social Change for "Refugee" (Won)
- 2024 Toronto International Film Festival
  - FIPRESCI Prize for Mother Mother (Won)
- 2024 SOCAN Cultural Impact Award for "Wavin' Flag" (Won)

== Discography ==
Studio albums

- What Next? (2000) (as Keinaan)
- My Life Is a Movie (2004)
- The Dusty Foot Philosopher (2005)
- Troubadour (2009)
- Country, God or the Girl (2012)

== Filmography ==
Film and television
Year	Title	Director	Actor	Writer	Producer	Notes
2007	4Real	No	Yes	No	No	Role: Himself
2012	Cosmopolis	No	Yes	No	No	Role: Brutha Fez
2016	Mogadishu, Minnesota	Yes	No	Yes	Executive	Television film
2019	Castle Rock	No	No	Yes	Consulting	Writer, S02 E02; Producer, S02 E01–E10
2023	Extrapolations	No	No	No	Consulting	S01 E03
2024	Mother Mother	Yes	No	Yes	No	Feature film

== See also ==
- Canadian hip hop
- Music of Canada
- Music of Somalia
