= Canadian Hot 100 =

Music industry record chart for songs

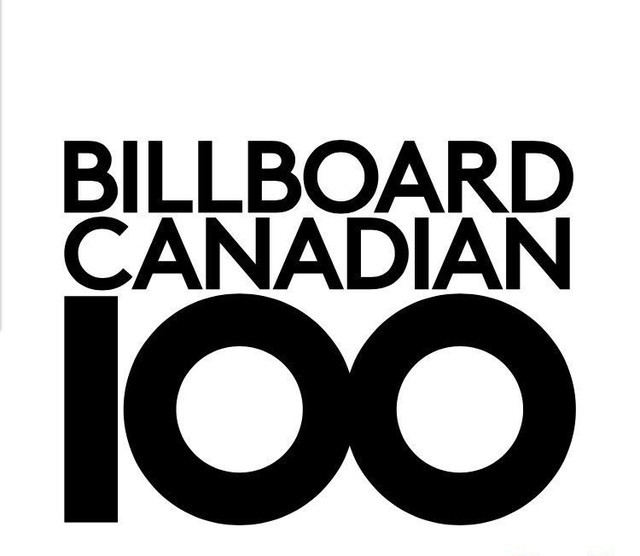
The current Canadian Hot 100 logo

The Canadian Hot 100 is a music industry record chart in Canada for songs, published weekly by Billboard magazine. It was launched on the issue dated March 31, 2007 as the standard record chart in Canada; a new chart is compiled and released to the public by Billboard on Tuesdays, but post-dated to the following Saturday.

The chart is similar to Billboard's US-based Hot 100 in that it combines physical and digital sales, radio airplay, and streaming activity from digital music sources in Canada, all tracked and compiled by Luminate. Canada's radio airplay is the result of monitoring more than 100 stations representing rock, country, adult contemporary and Top 40 genres.

The first number-one song of the Canadian Hot 100 was "Girlfriend" by Avril Lavigne on March 31, 2007. As of the issue for the week ending November 14, 2026, the Canadian Hot 100 has had 223 different number-one songs. The current number-one song is "Choosin' Texas" by Ella Langley.

== History ==
The chart was launched on the issue dated March 31, 2007 and was made available for the first time via Billboard online services on June 7, 2007. With this launch, it marked the first time that Billboard created a Hot 100 chart for a country outside the United States.

Billboard charts manager Geoff Mayfield announced the premiere of the chart, explaining "the new Billboard Canadian Hot 100 will serve as the definitive measure of Canada's most popular songs, continuing our magazine's longstanding tradition of using the most comprehensive resources available to provide the world's most authoritative music charts."

The Billboard Canadian Hot 100 is managed by Paul Tuch, director of Canadian operations for Nielsen BDS, in consultation with Silvio Pietroluongo, Billboard's associate director of charts and manager of the Billboard Hot 100.

== Song achievements ==
=== Songs with most weeks at number one ===
Number of weeks	Artist(s)	Song	Year(s)	Ref.
25	Shaboozey	"A Bar Song (Tipsy)"	2024	
24	Ella Langley	"Choosin' Texas"	2026	
21	Alex Warren	"Ordinary"	2025	
19	Lil Nas X featuring Billy Ray Cyrus	"Old Town Road"	2019	
18	Harry Styles	"As It Was"	2022	
16	The Black Eyed Peas	"I Gotta Feeling"	2009	
16	Ed Sheeran	"Shape of You"	2017	
16	Luis Fonsi and Daddy Yankee featuring Justin Bieber	"Despacito"	2017	
16	Mariah Carey	"All I Want for Christmas Is You"	2019–2026	
15	Mark Ronson featuring Bruno Mars	"Uptown Funk"	2015	
15	Miley Cyrus	"Flowers"	2023	
15	Taylor Swift	"The Fate of Ophelia"	2025–2026	

=== Number-one debuts ===
- Eminem, Dr. Dre and 50 Cent – "Crack a Bottle" (February 21, 2009)
- Taylor Swift – "Today Was a Fairytale" (February 20, 2010)
- Young Artists for Haiti – "Wavin' Flag" (March 27, 2010)
- Eminem – "Not Afraid" (May 22, 2010)
- Katy Perry featuring Snoop Dogg – "California Gurls" (May 29, 2010)
- Britney Spears – "Hold It Against Me" (January 29, 2011)
- Lady Gaga – "Born This Way" (February 26, 2011)
- Katy Perry – "Part of Me" (March 3, 2012)
- Justin Bieber – "Boyfriend" (April 14, 2012)
- Taylor Swift – "We Are Never Ever Getting Back Together" (September 1, 2012)
- Katy Perry – "Roar" (August 31, 2013)
- Eminem featuring Rihanna – "The Monster" (November 16, 2013)
- Taylor Swift – "Shake It Off" (September 6, 2014)
- Justin Bieber – "What Do You Mean?" (September 19, 2015)
- Adele – "Hello" (November 14, 2015)
- Zayn – "Pillowtalk" (February 20, 2016)
- Major Lazer featuring Justin Bieber and MØ – "Cold Water" (August 13, 2016)
- Ed Sheeran – "Shape of You" (January 28, 2017)
- DJ Khaled featuring Justin Bieber, Quavo, Chance the Rapper and Lil Wayne – "I'm the One" (May 20, 2017)
- Taylor Swift – "Look What You Made Me Do" (September 16, 2017)
- Post Malone featuring 21 Savage – "Rockstar" (October 7, 2017)
- Drake – "God's Plan" (February 3, 2018)
- The Weeknd – "Call Out My Name" (April 14, 2018)
- Drake – "Nice for What" (April 21, 2018)
- Childish Gambino – "This Is America" (May 19, 2018)
- Maroon 5 featuring Cardi B – "Girls Like You" (June 16, 2018)
- Drake – "Nonstop" (July 14, 2018)
- Kanye West and Lil Pump – "I Love It" (September 22, 2018)
- Eminem – "Killshot" (September 29, 2018)
- Kodak Black featuring Travis Scott and Offset – "Zeze" (October 27, 2018)
- Ariana Grande – "Thank U, Next" (November 17, 2018)
- Ariana Grande – "7 Rings" (February 2, 2019)
- Jonas Brothers – "Sucker" (March 16, 2019)
- Billie Eilish – "Bad Guy" (April 13, 2019)
- Travis Scott – "Highest in the Room" (October 19, 2019)
- The Scotts (Travis Scott and Kid Cudi) – "The Scotts" (May 9, 2020)
- Ariana Grande and Justin Bieber – "Stuck with U" (May 23, 2020)
- Lady Gaga and Ariana Grande – "Rain on Me" (June 6, 2020)
- DJ Khaled featuring Drake – "Popstar" (August 1, 2020)
- Cardi B featuring Megan Thee Stallion – "WAP" (August 22, 2020)
- Drake featuring Lil Durk – "Laugh Now Cry Later" (August 29, 2020)
- Justin Bieber featuring Chance the Rapper – "Holy" (October 3, 2020)
- Justin Bieber and Benny Blanco – "Lonely" (October 31, 2020)
- Ariana Grande – "Positions" (November 7, 2020)
- Shawn Mendes and Justin Bieber – "Monster" (December 5, 2020)
- Taylor Swift – "Willow" (December 26, 2020)
- Olivia Rodrigo – "Drivers License" (January 23, 2021)
- Lil Tjay featuring 6lack – "Calling My Phone" (February 27, 2021)
- Drake – "What's Next" (March 20, 2021)
- Justin Bieber featuring Daniel Caesar and Giveon – "Peaches" (April 3, 2021)
- Polo G – "Rapstar" (April 24, 2021)
- Olivia Rodrigo – "Good 4 U" (May 29, 2021)
- Ed Sheeran – "Bad Habits" (July 10, 2021)
- The Kid Laroi and Justin Bieber – "Stay" (July 24, 2021)
- Taylor Swift – "All Too Well (Taylor's Version)" (November 27, 2021)
- Harry Styles – "As It Was" (April 16, 2022)
- Jack Harlow – "First Class" (April 23, 2022)
- Drake featuring 21 Savage – "Jimmy Cooks" (July 2, 2022)
- Sam Smith and Kim Petras – "Unholy" (October 8, 2022)
- Taylor Swift – "Anti-Hero" (November 5, 2022)
- Drake and 21 Savage – "Rich Flex" (November 19, 2022)
- Metro Boomin, the Weeknd and 21 Savage – "Creepin'" (December 17, 2022)
- Miley Cyrus – "Flowers" (January 28, 2023)
- Olivia Rodrigo – "Vampire" (July 15, 2023)
- Travis Scott featuring Drake – "Meltdown" (August 12, 2023)
- Drake featuring Yeat – "IDGAF" (October 21, 2023)
- Taylor Swift – "Is It Over Now?" (November 11, 2023)
- Ariana Grande – "Yes, And?" (January 27, 2024)
- Future, Metro Boomin and Kendrick Lamar – "Like That" (April 6, 2024)
- Taylor Swift featuring Post Malone – "Fortnight" (May 4, 2024)
- Post Malone featuring Morgan Wallen – "I Had Some Help" (May 25, 2024)
- Eminem – "Houdini" (June 15, 2024)
- Taylor Swift – "The Fate of Ophelia" (October 18, 2025)
- Olivia Rodrigo – "Drop Dead" (May 2, 2026)
- Drake – "Janice STFU" (May 30, 2026)
- Taylor Swift – "I Knew It, I Knew You" (June 20, 2026)
- Taylor Swift – "Patient Zero" (October 10, 2026)
- Tate McRae – "Housewife" (October 31, 2026)

=== Artists with the most number-one songs ===
Number of songs	Artist	Ref.
15	Taylor Swift	
14	Drake	
13	Justin Bieber	
11	Rihanna	
10	Katy Perry	
7	The Weeknd	
7	Ariana Grande	
7	Lady Gaga	
7	Bruno Mars	
6	Eminem	

=== Artists with the most cumulative weeks at number one ===
Number of weeks	Artist	Ref.
56	Justin Bieber	
49	Taylor Swift	
46	Rihanna	
44	Drake	
39	Bruno Mars	
34	Katy Perry	
34	Maroon 5	
34	Lady Gaga	
32	The Black Eyed Peas	
26	Ed Sheeran	

=== Self-replacement at number one ===
- The Black Eyed Peas – "Boom Boom Pow" → "I Gotta Feeling" (July 4, 2009)
- Taylor Swift – "Shake It Off" → "Blank Space" (November 29, 2014)
- Justin Bieber – "I'm the One" (DJ Khaled featuring Justin Bieber, Quavo, Chance the Rapper and Lil Wayne) → "Despacito" (Luis Fonsi and Daddy Yankee featuring Justin Bieber) (May 27, 2017)
- Drake – "Nonstop" → "In My Feelings" (July 21, 2018)
- Taylor Swift – "Cruel Summer" → "Is It Over Now?" (November 11, 2023)
- Taylor Swift – "Is It Over Now?" → "Cruel Summer" (November 18, 2023)

=== Other achievements ===
- Taylor Swift is the artist with the most number-one debuts in Canadian Hot 100 history, with 12.
- Teenage Dream by Katy Perry and Scorpion by Drake are the albums with most number-one songs (4 each).
- "Lose Control" by Teddy Swims holds the record for the longest stay on the chart (98 weeks).
- "Heat Waves" by Glass Animals had the longest climb to number one taking 64 weeks to reach that peak.
- On the issue dated March 31, 2007, Avril Lavigne became the first Canadian act to top the Canadian Hot 100 with "Girlfriend".
- On the issue dated June 27, 2009, the Black Eyed Peas became the first act to simultaneously occupy the top two positions with "Boom Boom Pow" at number one and "I Gotta Feeling" at number two.
- On the issue dated October 24, 2009, "3" by Britney Spears broke the record for the biggest jump to number one, leaping from number 86 to number one.
- On the issue dated February 27, 2010, Nikki Yanofsky became the youngest artist to top the Canadian Hot 100 at 16 years, 19 days old with the song "I Believe".
- On the issue dated October 6, 2012, "Gangnam Style" by Psy became the first non-English song to top the Canadian Hot 100.
- On the issue dated October 31, 2015, the Weeknd's "The Hills" reached the top spot seven weeks after "Can't Feel My Face", becoming the first time in Canadian Hot 100 history that an album's lead single hit #1 after the second single did.
- In 2016, Justin Bieber became the first Canadian act to top the Year-End chart with "Sorry".
- On the issue dated January 28, 2017, Ed Sheeran became the first act to simultaneously debut at the top two positions with "Shape of You" at number one and "Castle on the Hill" at number two.
- On the issue dated January 12, 2019, "All I Want for Christmas Is You" by Mariah Carey had the biggest drop out of the Canadian Hot 100, dropping off from #1. On the issue dated January 14, 2023, "Rockin' Around the Christmas Tree" by Brenda Lee would also achieve this record.
- On the issue dated May 25, 2019, "I Don't Care" by Ed Sheeran and Justin Bieber jumped 90 spots to number 2, becoming the biggest single-week jump on the Canadian Hot 100's history.
- "All I Want for Christmas Is You" by Mariah Carey holds the record for largest gap between turns at #1, falling from the position on the week ending January 12, 2019 and returning the week ending January 4, 2020, a 51-week gap.
- On the issue dated November 5, 2022, Taylor Swift became the first artist to simultaneously occupy the Canadian Hot 100's entire top 10. She would repeat this feat on the issue dated October 18, 2025, also becoming the first artist to simultaneously occupy the Canadian Hot 100's entire top 12.
- On the issue dated January 7, 2023, Brenda Lee became the oldest artist to top the Canadian Hot 100 at 78 years, 27 days old with the song "Rockin' Around the Christmas Tree". Originally released when on November 28, 1958, when Lee was 13 years, 11 months, and 13 days old, it makes her voice the youngest voice to reach the top spot on the chart, as well as the longest time between original release and date of reaching number one, 64 years, 1 month, and 10 days, or 3,345 weeks.
- On the issue dated May 30, 2026, Drake became the artist with the most simultaneously charting songs in a single week (42) and the most chart debuts in a week (40) on the Canadian Hot 100.

== See also ==
- Canadian Albums Chart
- List of artists who reached number one on the Canadian Hot 100
- List of number-one singles in Canada
