= Awolnation discography =

American rock band discography

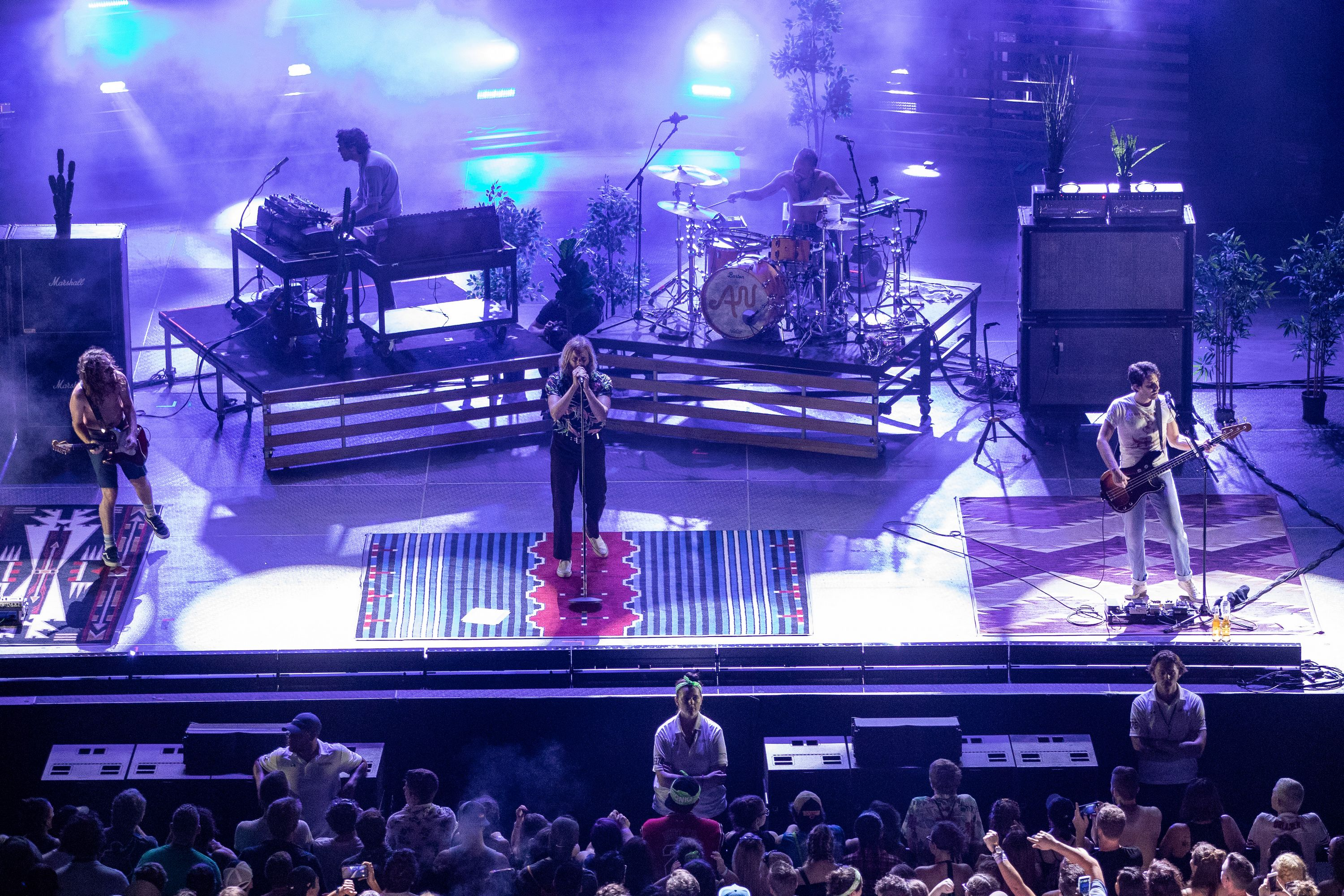
- Awolnation performing in 2018
- Studio albums: 5
- EPs: 4
- Singles: 29
- Music videos: 28
- Cover albums: 1
- Promotional singles: 10

American rock band Awolnation has released five studio albums, four extended plays, one covers album, twenty nine singles, twenty eight music videos, and ten promotional singles. The band is signed to Better Noise Music since the release of their fourth EP, previously being signed to Red Bull Records, and their first EP, Back from Earth, was released on iTunes on May 18, 2010. They released their first studio album, Megalithic Symphony, on March 15, 2011; it featured their biggest hit single, "Sail", which peaked at number 17 on the Billboard Hot 100, number four on the Billboard Rock Songs chart, and number five on the Billboard Alternative Songs chart. The song has been certified 6× platinum by the RIAA and has sold 5,500,000 copies in the United States. As of February 29, 2016, the album has been certified platinum. The band's second studio album, Run, was released on March 17, 2015.

== Studio albums ==
List of studio albums, with selected chart positions and certifications
Title	Album details	Peak chart positions										Sales	Certifications
Title	Album details	US	US Indie	US Rock	AUS Hit.	AUT	CAN	GER	SWI	UK	UK Indie	Sales	Certifications
Megalithic Symphony	Released: March 15, 2011 (US); Label: Red Bull; Formats: CD, LP, download	84	9	21	4	57	53	—	—	165	13	US: 581,000	RIAA: Platinum; MC: 2× Platinum
Run	Released: March 17, 2015; Label: Red Bull; Formats: CD, LP, download	17	2	4	3	11	9	83	50	137	41		MC: Gold
Here Come the Runts	Released: February 2, 2018; Label: Red Bull; Formats: CD, LP, download	20	1	2	—	44	25	—	57	—	38		
Angel Miners & the Lightning Riders	Released: April 24, 2020; Label: Better Noise Music; Formats: CD, LP, download	— (Note: Angel Miners & the Lightning Riders did not enter the US Billboard 200, but peaked at number 16 on the Album Sales Chart.)	18	41	—	42	—	—	64	—	—		
The Phantom Five	Released: August 30, 2024; Label: Two Twenty Five Music; Formats: CD, LP, download	—	—	—	—	—	—	—	—	—	—		
"—" denotes a recording that did not chart or was not released in that territory.

== Extended plays ==
List of extended plays
Title	Album details
Back from Earth	Released: May 18, 2010 (US); Label: Red Bull; Formats: CD, digital download
RE/SAIL	Released: April 12, 2012 (US); Label: Red Bull; Formats: Digital download
I've Been Dreaming	Released: June 6, 2012 (US); Label: Red Bull; Formats: Digital download
Candy Pop	Scheduled: November 10, 2023 (US); Label: Better Noise; Formats: Digital download

== Cover albums ==
List of cover albums, with selected chart positions
Title	Album details	Peak chart positions
Title	Album details	US
My Echo, My Shadow, My Covers, and Me	Released: May 6, 2022; Label: Better Noise Music; Formats: CD, digital download	— (Note: My Echo, My Shadow, My Covers & Me did not enter the US Billboard 200, but peaked at number 84 on the Current Album Sales Chart.)

== Singles ==
=== As lead artist ===
List of singles, with selected chart positions and certifications, showing year released and album name
Title	Year	Peak chart positions										Certifications	Album
Title	Year	US	US Rock	AUS	AUT	CAN	FRA	GER	SWE	SWI	UK	Certifications	Album
"Sail"	2011	17	4	27	4	48	48	58	32	35	17	RIAA: Diamond; ARIA: Platinum; BPI: 2× Platinum; IFPI AUT: Gold; IFPI SWE: 3× Platinum; IFPI SWI: Gold; MC: Diamond	Megalithic Symphony
"Not Your Fault"	2011	—	11	—	—	—	—	—	—	—	—	RIAA: Gold; MC: Gold	Megalithic Symphony
"Kill Your Heroes"	2012	— (Note: "Kill Your Heroes" did not enter the Billboard Hot 100, but peaked at number 20 on the Heatseekers Songs chart.)	16	—	—	—	—	—	—	—	—	RIAA: Gold; MC: Gold	Megalithic Symphony
"Hollow Moon (Bad Wolf)"	2015	— (Note: "Hollow Moon (Bad Wolf)" did not enter the Billboard Hot 100, but peaked at number 25 on the Bubbling Under Hot 100 Singles chart, which acts as an extension to the Hot 100.)	11	—	—	—	—	—	—	—	—		Run
"I Am"	2015	—	18	—	—	—	—	—	—	—	—		Run
"Woman Woman"	2016	—	28	—	—	—	—	—	—	—	—		Run
"Run (Beautiful Things)"	2016	—	26	—	—	—	—	—	—	—	—		Non-album single
"Passion"	2017	—	35	—	—	—	—	—	—	—	—		Here Come the Runts
"Handyman"	2018	—	20	—	—	—	—	—	—	—	—		Here Come the Runts
"Table for One" (solo or featuring Elohim)	2018	—	—	—	—	—	—	—	—	—	—		Here Come the Runts
"The Best" (solo or featuring Alice Merton)	2019	—	11	—	—	—	—	—	—	—	—		Angel Miners & the Lightning Riders
"California Halo Blue"	2019	—	46	—	—	—	—	—	—	—	—		Angel Miners & the Lightning Riders
"Mayday!!! Fiesta Fever" (featuring Alex Ebert)	2020	—	— (Note: "Mayday!!! Fiesta Fever" did not enter the Rock Songs chart, but peaked at number 48 on the Rock & Alternative Airplay chart.)	—	—	—	—	—	—	—	—		Angel Miners & the Lightning Riders
"Slam (Angel Miners)"	2020	—	—	—	—	—	—	—	—	—	—		Angel Miners & the Lightning Riders
"Jet Pack (Capala)"	2020	—	—	—	—	—	—	—	—	—	—		Non-album single
"Carry On" (with The Score)	2020	—	—	—	—	—	—	—	—	—	—		Carry On
"Wind of Change" (featuring Portugal. The Man and Brandon Boyd of Incubus)	2022	—	—	—	—	—	—	—	—	—	—		My Echo, My Shadow, My Covers, and Me
"Freaking Me Out"	2022	—	—	—	—	—	—	—	—	—	—		Candy Pop
"We Are All Insane"	2022	—	—	—	—	—	—	—	—	—	—		Candy Pop
"Dark Matter" (with Masked Wolf)	2023	—	—	—	—	—	—	—	—	—	—		Non-album single
"Candy Pop"	2023	—	—	—	—	—	—	—	—	—	—		Candy Pop
"Panoramic View"	2024	—	— (Note: "Panoramic View" did not enter the Hot Rock & Alternative Songs chart, but peaked at number 17 on the Rock & Alternative Airplay chart.)	—	—	—	—	—	—	—	—		The Phantom Five
"Jump Sit Stand March"(featuring Emily Armstrong of Dead Sara and Linkin Park)	2024	—	—	—	—	—	—	—	—	—	—		The Phantom Five
"I Am Happy" (featuring Del the Funky Homosapien)	2024	—	—	—	—	—	—	—	—	—	—		The Phantom Five
"Barbarian"	2024	—	— (Note: "Barbarian" did not enter the Hot Rock & Alternative Songs chart, but peaked at number 43 on the Rock & Alternative Airplay chart.)	—	—	—	—	—	—	—	—		The Phantom Five
"—" denotes a recording that did not chart or was not released in that territory.

=== As featured artist ===
List of singles, with selected chart positions, showing year released and album name
Title	Year	Peak chart positions					Album
Title	Year	US Hard Rock	US Main	US Rock Air	CAN DL	CZ Rock	Album
"Kill It 4 the Kids" (Kill the Noise featuring Awolnation & R.City)	2016	—	—	—	—	—	Occult Classic
"Maybe It's Time" (Sixx:A.M. featuring Joe Elliott, Brantley Gilbert, Ivan Moody, Slash, Corey Taylor, Awolnation & Tommy Vext)	2020	8	12	44	45	12	Sno Babies Soundtrack
"Disco Body Parts" (Yung Bae featuring Awolnation)	2021	—	—	—	—	—	Groove Continental: Side A
"Guiding Lights" (Pendulum featuring Awolnation)	2025	—	—	—	—	—	Inertia
"—" denotes a recording that did not chart or was not released in that territory.

=== Promotional singles ===
List of promotional singles, with selected chart positions, showing year released and album name
Title	Year	Peak chart positions									Album
Title	Year	US Bub.	US Alt	US Hard Rock DL	US Rock	CAN DL	CAN Rock	CZ Rock	SWE Heat	UK Indie	Album
"Burn It Down"	2010	—	—	—	—	—	—	—	—	—	Back from Earth
"Thiskidsnotalright"	2011	—	21	—	— (Note: "Thiskidsnotalright" did not enter the Rock Songs chart, but peaked at number 28 on the Rock Airplay chart.)	—	32	—	—	—	Megalithic Symphony
"I'm on Fire"	2015	10	— (Note: "I'm on Fire" did not enter the Alternative Airplay chart, but peaked at number seven on the Alternative Digital Song Sales chart.)	1	13	43	—	—	15	14	Fifty Shades of Grey: Original Motion Picture Soundtrack
"Windows"	2015	—	—	—	—	—	—	3	—	—	Run
"Seven Sticks of Dynamite"	2017	—	—	—	—	—	—	—	—	—	Here Come the Runts
"Miracle Man"	2017	—	—	—	—	—	—	12	—	—	Here Come the Runts
"Pacific Coast Highway in the Movies" (featuring Rivers Cuomo)	2020	—	—	—	—	—	—	—	—	—	Angel Miners & the Lightning Riders
"Beds are Burning" (featuring Tim McIlrath of Rise Against)	2022	—	25	—	— (Note: "Beds are Burning" did not enter the Hot Rock & Alternative Songs chart, but peaked at number 35 on the Rock & Alternative Airplay chart.)	—	—	—	—	—	My Echo, My Shadow, My Covers, and Me
"Material Girl" (featuring Taylor Hanson of Hanson)	2022	—	—	—	—	—	—	—	—	—	My Echo, My Shadow, My Covers, and Me
"Take a Chance on Me" (featuring Jewel)	2022	—	—	—	—	—	—	—	—	—	My Echo, My Shadow, My Covers, and Me
"—" denotes a recording that did not chart or was not released in that territory.

== Music videos ==
Song	Year	Director(s)
"Burn It Down"	2010	Jeffrey Reed
"Sail"	2011	Cameron Duddy
"Not Your Fault"	2011	Cameron Duddy
"Kill Your Heroes"	2012	Cameron Duddy
"Hollow Moon (Bad Wolf)"	2015	Hayley Young
"I Am"	2015	Hayley Young
"Woman Woman"	2016	Marc Klasfeld
"Run (Beautiful Things)"	2016	Unknown
"Passion"	2017	Ravi Dhar
"Seven Sticks of Dynamite"	2017	Riley Harper and Aaron Bruno
"Handyman"	2018	Ravi Dhar
"The Best"	2019	Amalia Irons
"California Halo Blue"	2019	Ravi Dhar
"Mayday!!! Fiesta Fever" (feat. Alex Ebert)	2020	Ravi Dhar
"Slam (Angel Miners)"	2020	Cole Higgins
"Pacific Coast Highway in the Movies" (feat. Rivers Cuomo)	2020	Ravi Dhar
"Radical"	2020	Ravi Dhar
"Wind of Change" (ft. Brandon Boyd & Portugal. The Man)	2022	Amalia Irons
"Beds Are Burning" (ft. Tim McLlarth)	2022	Jason Michael Hall
"Material Girl" (ft. Taylor Hanson)	2022	Amalia Irons
"Take A Chance On Me" (ft. Jewel)	2022	Eliot Charof
"Freaking Me Out"	2022	Eliot Charof
"We Are All Insane"	2022	Eliot Charof
"Candy Pop"	2023	Eliot Charof
"Panoramic View"	2024	Darren Doane
"Jump Sit Stand March" (ft. Emily Armstrong)	2024	Darren Doane
"I Am Happy" (ft. Del the Funky Homosapien)	2024	Ryan Clark
"Barbarian"	2024	Darren Doane
