= Mark Watrous =

American singer-songwriter

- Born: Mark Watrous; Richland, Washington
- Origin: Tri-Cities, Washington
- Genres: Hard rock; alternative rock; indie rock
- Occupations: Singer–songwriter, musician, visual artist
- Years active: 1995–present
- Labels: American Records; DreamWorks; The Control Group; V2; Columbia

Mark Watrous is a singer, songwriter, multi-instrumentalist and graphic/video artist from Richland, Washington. He is best known as a former member of the band Gosling (also known as Loudermilk). Watrous is currently a member of Earl Burrows and the Shins and has routinely performed as a touring member of the Raconteurs, the Greenhornes, Shudder to Think, Brendan Benson, and Karen Elson among others.

== Biography ==
=== Loudermilk (1995–2004) ===
In 1995, friends Davey Ingersoll (vocals, guitar), Mark Watrous (guitar), Shane Middleton (bass) and Issac Carpenter (drums) formed the hard rock quartet Loudermilk in Tri-Cities, Washington. They released their own album, Man with Gun Kills Three!, independently in 1998. After hearing an unauthorized demo, American Recordings subsequently signed the group. Commenting on the demos, Ingersoll stated that the demo was made just to get songs down and that "It was something [he] didn't even want people to hear". Despite touring with groups such as Mötley Crüe and Megadeth, they were dropped from the label. Speaking about the group being dropped from the label, Ingersoll stated:

"It was a learning experience [...] We didn't deliver the record they were expecting, whatever that was. The whole thing was like an episode of 'Behind The Music'."

DreamWorks Records signed them in early 2002. Several months later, they recorded and released their first official major label album, The Red Record.

=== Gosling (2004–2006) ===
In 2004, Loudermilk changed their name to Gosling, after changing their musical style, retaining all members with Watrous switching from guitar to keyboards. Influenced by the likes of Sunny Day Real Estate, The Smashing Pumpkins, Pink Floyd and Queen, they released the Gosling EP through The Control Group in August 2004. Earlier in the year, they supported Velvet Revolver at The Roxy Theatre in West Hollywood, California. They released their debut full-length Here Is... in 2006 through V2 and went on to tour with Rose Hill Drive.

A cover of David Bowie's "Cat People (Putting Out Fire)" was included on the soundtrack to the film Underworld: Evolution in 2006.

=== The Shins (2012–present) ===
In 2012, Watrous joined indie rock band the Shins as guitarist and multi-instrumentalist
