= I Am (Awolnation song) =

2015 single by Awolnation

Single by Awolnation

from the album Run
- Released: July 7, 2015
- Recorded: 2014
- Genre: Electronic rock
- Length: 4:34
- Label: Red Bull
- Songwriter: Aaron Bruno
- Producer: Aaron Bruno

Awolnation singles chronology
"Hollow Moon (Bad Wolf)" (2015)	"I Am" (2015)	"Woman Woman" (2015)

Music video
- "I Am" on YouTube

"I Am" is a song by American alternative rock band Awolnation. It was released as the third single from their second studio album Run (2015).

== Music video ==
The music video was released on June 29, 2015.

== Background ==
The band's frontman Aaron Bruno describes the song as a "self-empowering anthem" that was inspired by a guitar given to him by his dad. "I wrote (the song) real late at night," Bruno continued. "At least the intro, the first verse. Didn't think much about it, and then months later we listened to my phone recording, my voice memo, and heard that initial idea and thought, OK, this seems cool, let's work on this. It kind of wrote itself and was a pretty easy song to write. That's usually a good sign for me."

The song was written in a key of E major and has a tempo of 130 BPM.

== Remixes ==
=== Steve Aoki Remix ===
American DJ and producer Steve Aoki released his remix of "I Am". It was uploaded to his SoundCloud account on June 23, 2015 and it was available for free at Red Bull Records' official website.

"I Am (Steve Aoki Remix)"

Single by Awolnation
- Released: June 23, 2015
- Recorded: 2015
- Genre: Electronic rock
- Length: 4:57
- Songwriter: Aaron Bruno

=== Mike D Remix ===
Another remix of the song by American hip hop band Beastie Boys member Mike D was released on November 12. “When I heard ‘I Am,’ it had the anthemic dynamics that we associate with Awolnation. I had a different version in my head of what the song could be, so was happy to be able to manifest that” he quoted. The remix was commissioned by former Mike D / Grand Royal Records employee Kenny "Tick" Salcido, who at the time served as Red Bull Records A&R executive.

"I Am (Mike D Remix)"

Single by Awolnation
- Released: September 12, 2015
- Recorded: 2015
- Genre: Hip hop
- Length: 4:24
- Songwriter: Aaron Bruno

== Charts ==
=== Weekly charts ===
Chart (2015)	Peak position
US Hot Rock & Alternative Songs (Billboard)	18
US Rock & Alternative Airplay (Billboard)	6

=== Year-end charts ===
Chart (2015)	Position
US Hot Rock Songs (Billboard)	56
US Rock Airplay (Billboard)	35
