= Here Come the Runts =

Studio album by Awolnation
- Released: 2 February 2018
- Recorded: 2017
- Studios: Aaron Bruno's home studio, Malibu, California
- Genres: Alternative rock; pop rock; indie rock; electropop
- Length: 45:43
- Label: Red Bull
- Producer: Aaron Bruno

Awolnation chronology
Run (2015)	Here Come the Runts (2018)	Angel Miners & the Lightning Riders (2020)

Singles from Here Come the Runts
- 1. "Passion" Released: October 12, 2017; 2. "Handyman" Released: January 18, 2018

Professional ratings
Aggregate scores
Source	Rating
Metacritic	65/100
Review scores
Source	Rating
Allmusic	3/5 stars
Alternative Addiction	4/5 stars
Altwire	A+
The A.V. Club	B+
Belfast Telegraph	9/10
Classic Rock	4/5 stars
Express and Star	9/10
Music Connection	10/10
Newsday	3/4 stars
The Soundboard Reviews	6/10

Here Come the Runts is the third studio album by American rock band Awolnation, released on February 2, 2018, through Red Bull Records. It is their first album to be released since Run was released in 2015. The name of it was inspired from "scenes from Bruno's own home in Malibu, where his wife fosters puppies." Bruno explained the meaning of the album in depth in an interview: "We always are drawn to the runt of the litter in a lot of ways. They have to scrap a little bit more. They're overlooked in many cases, and they shouldn't be. A lot of people who are against all odds and are maybe unnoticed, I think, with all the obstacles end up being stronger and have to find a different way to stand out. That even goes in the music industry as well. It felt like that for me anyways."

The album was preceded by the singles "Passion" and "Handyman". The promotional singles "Seven Sticks of Dynamite" and "Miracle Man" were released on November 6, 2017 and December 15, 2017, respectively. On October 18, 2018, an alternate version of "Table for One" featuring singer Elohim was released. The album has 14 tracks, two of which are interludes.

== Background ==
Unlike the band's previous two albums, this album has more of an organic, natural sound to it, as described by singer Aaron Bruno. He said, "It's like a non-GMO record... no fake shit." "A lot of records you hear, there's so much tuning of the vocals, it's like listening to a robot," Bruno told Germany's MYP. "On my record, there's none of that, and I'm really proud of that—which is funny to say because it seems like that should be the standard if you're listening to an album. You just should be hearing the guy or girl sing and it should be their voice. But almost all records are tuned. Auto-tuned. And that's fake."

The album was recorded entirely in Bruno's house in Malibu, primarily from his new home studio but also with some drums recorded into his iPhone in his living room before the studio was ready. The band released several teaser videos on their YouTube channel to promote the album before it was officially released. The album generally received positive reviews from critics.

== Track listing ==
All tracks are written by Aaron Bruno.

No.	Title	Length
1.	"Here Come the Runts"	3:19
2.	"Passion"	3:22
3.	"Sound Witness System" (featuring Sickabod Sane)	2:22
4.	"Miracle Man"	3:24
5.	"Handyman"	3:22
6.	"Jealous Buffoon"	3:09
7.	"Seven Sticks of Dynamite"	4:06
8.	"A Little Luck... and a Couple of Dogs"	0:30
9.	"Table for One"	4:39
10.	"My Molasses"	3:32
11.	"Cannonball"	3:09
12.	"Tall, Tall Tale"	2:57
13.	"The Buffoon"	1:54
14.	"Stop That Train"	6:02
Total length:		45:43

== Personnel ==
Awolnation

- Aaron Bruno – vocals, guitar, synthesizer, drums, percussion, production, mixing
- Isaac Carpenter – drums, percussion, guitar
- Zach Irons – guitar
- Daniel Saslow – keyboards

Additional contributors

- Eric Stenman – mixing, engineering
- Vlado Meller – mastering
- Jeremy Lubsey – assistance
- Jon Monroy – slide guitar
- Charley Pollard – horns
- Sickabod Sane – vocals (track 3)
- Marc Walloch – acoustic guitar (5)
- Douglas Gledhill – design, layout
- Simon McLoughlin – design, layout
- Henry Diltz – photography

== Charts ==
Chart (2018)	Peak position
Austrian Albums (Ö3 Austria)	44
Canadian Albums (Billboard)	25
New Zealand Heatseeker Albums (RMNZ)	4
Swiss Albums (Schweizer Hitparade)	57
US Billboard 200	20
US Top Alternative Albums (Billboard)	2
US Top Rock Albums (Billboard)	2
