= Stenman =

Stenman is a surname. It means Mason and may refer to:

- Eric Stenman, American record producer
- Fredrik Stenman (born 1983), Swedish footballer
