= The Phantom Five =

2024 studio album by Awolnation

Studio album by Awolnation
- Released: August 30, 2024
- Length: 33:19
- Label: Two Twenty Five
- Producer: Aaron Bruno

Awolnation chronology
Candy Pop (2023)	The Phantom Five (2024)

Singles from The Phantom Five
- 1. "Panoramic View" Released: March 29, 2024; 2. "Jump Sit Stand March" Released: May 31, 2024; 3. "I Am Happy" Released: July 19, 2024; 4. "Barbarian" Released: August 30, 2024

The Phantom Five is the fifth (Note: While it is technically the band's sixth album, they do not count their covers album My Echo, My Shadow, My Covers, and Me as a studio album.) studio album by the American rock band Awolnation. It was released on August 30, 2024.

== Background ==
The first single from the album, "Panoramic View", was released on March 29, 2024. On May 23, 2024, the album's title and cover art were revealed. A week later, on May 31 the band released the single "Jump Sit Stand March", which features Emily Armstrong of the band Dead Sara, and later Linkin Park. According to Awolnation's frontman Aaron Bruno, the song is about "overstimulation and being frustrated with having to please everybody's virtues all at the same time."

Bruno stated that The Phantom Five will most likely be the final Awolnation album, though he may still continue to write music for other projects. He described the record as "almost a 'greatest hits' album, in the sense that it offers something for everyone who has followed the band's arc in its celebrated, shape-shifting way."

On July 19, the band released another single, "I Am Happy" featuring Del the Funky Homosapien. On the day the album was released, they released the single "Barbarian".

== Track listing ==
All tracks are written by Aaron R. Bruno, except where noted.

The Phantom Five track listing
No.	Title	Writer(s)	Length
1.	"Jump Sit Stand March" (featuring Emily Armstrong)		3:52
2.	"Party People"	Bruno, Isaac H. Carpenter	3:21
3.	"Panoramic View"	Bruno, Zach Irons	3:53
4.	"I Am Happy" (featuring Del the Funky Homosapien)	Bruno, Teren Delvon Jones	3:03
5.	"Barbarian"		3:04
6.	"Bang Your Head"		2:22
7.	"City of Nowhere"		1:25
8.	"A Letter to No One"		4:02
9.	"When I Was Young"		3:11
10.	"Outta Here"		5:06
Total length:			33:19

== Personnel ==
All credits are adapted from the album's liner notes.

AWOLNATION

- Aaron Bruno (AWOL) – vocals, synths, production (all); acoustic guitar (1); drums (1, 4–9); guitars (2, 4–10); piano (3); bass (6)
- Isaac Carpenter – drums (2, 3, 6, 9, 10)
- Zach Irons – guitars (1–4, 6, 8–10); bass (2, 6)
- Daniel Saslow – synths (1, 3, 4, 8, 9)

Additional musicians

- Emily Armstrong – vocals (1)
- Del the Funky Homosapien – vocals (4)
- David Amezcua – bass (8)

Technical personnel

- Eric Stenman – engineering, mixing (all); bass (2, 6, 10); guitar (6, 10)
- Eric Brayhill – mastering
- Ryan Clark – art direction & design
- Jeremiah Scott – photography, wooden structures
- Abel Off – boy in photos
