= Candy Pop =

Candy Pop may refer to:

- Female punk-inspired pop music
  - Particularly in Japanese pop
- "Candy Pop", a song by Heartsdales featuring Soul'd Out
- "Candy Pop", a song by Len
- "Candy Pop" (Twice song)
- Candy Pop, a 2018 Twice concert tour
- Candy Pop (EP), a 2023 EP by Awolnation
