= Gosling (band) =

American rock band (1995–2006)

- Origin: Tri-Cities, Washington, United States
- Genres: Hard rock; alternative rock
- Years active: 1995–2006
- Labels: American; DreamWorks; The Control Group; V2
- Past members: Davey Ingersoll; Mark Watrous; Shane Middleton; Isaac Carpenter
- Website: goslingmusic.com

Gosling (previously known as Loudermilk) was an American rock band formed in Tri-Cities, Washington. The band was composed of Davey Ingersoll (vocals, guitar), Mark Watrous (guitar, later keyboards), Shane Middleton (bass) and Isaac Carpenter (drums, percussion). As Loudermilk, formed in 1995, the group released two albums; the independently released Man with Gun Kills Three! (1998) and then major label debut The Red Record (2002), and toured with Megadeth and Mötley Crüe. Loudermilk appeared in an episode of Dawson's Creek (Season 6, Episode 12) under the stylized name "LoudMilk" performing "Rock 'N' Roll & The Teenage Desperation" on stage. They also performed on the TV show Charmed (Season 5, Episode 19).

The group later, in 2004, changed both their name and music style and were then known as Gosling. They went on to release a self titled EP, through The Control Group in 2004 and their final album, Here Is..., through V2, in 2006. They played shows with Velvet Revolver and Rose Hill Drive before eventually disbanding.

== History ==
=== Loudermilk (1995–2004) ===
In 1995, friends Davey Ingersoll (vocals, guitar), Mark Watrous (guitar), Shane Middleton (bass) and Issac Carpenter (drums) formed the hard rock quartet Loudermilk in Tri-Cities, Washington. They released their own album, Man with Gun Kills Three!, independently in 1998. After hearing an unauthorized demo, American Recordings subsequently signed the group. Commenting on the demos, Ingersoll stated that the demo was made just to get songs down and that "It was something [he] didn't even want people to hear". Despite touring with groups such as Mötley Crüe and Megadeth, they were dropped from the label. Speaking about the group being dropped from the label, Ingersoll stated:

"It was a learning experience [...] We didn't deliver the record they were expecting, whatever that was. The whole thing was like an episode of 'Behind The Music'."

DreamWorks Records signed them in early 2002. Several months later, they recorded and released their first official major label album, The Red Record.

=== Gosling (2004–2006) ===
In 2004, Loudermilk changed their name to Gosling, after changing their musical style, retaining all members with Watrous switching from guitar to keyboards. Influenced by the likes of Sunny Day Real Estate, The Smashing Pumpkins, Pink Floyd and Queen, they released the Gosling EP through The Control Group in August 2004. Earlier in the year, they supported Velvet Revolver at The Roxy Theatre in West Hollywood, California. They released their debut full-length Here Is... in 2006 through V2 and went on to tour with Rose Hill Drive.

A cover of David Bowie's "Cat People (Putting Out Fire)" was included on the soundtrack to the film Underworld: Evolution in 2006.

=== Post-breakup ===
Drummer Carpenter went on to perform with a number of groups such as The Exies, Ours, Seaspin and Black Lab, among others. In 2009, became the drummer for Loaded, the band fronted by Guns N' Roses bassist Duff McKagan, replacing previous drummer Geoff Reading. In September 2010, the group completed the recording of their new album, which was produced by Terry Date.

Guitar player and keyboardist Mark Watrous has since functioned as a studio musician and a touring member of Shudder To Think, The Raconteurs, The Shins, Brendan Benson, Karen Elson, The Greenhornes and Cory Chisel & The Wandering Sons. In 2010, he released a split 7-inch under his own name with Canadian singer/songwriter Hannah Georgas, as well as a 7-inch with Brendan Benson as the fictional duo Well & Goode. He is now the frontman for the Nashville-based Earl Burrows.

== Band members ==
- Davey Ingersoll – vocals, guitar
- Mark Watrous – guitar, keyboard, backing vocals
- Shane Middleton – bass
- Isaac Carpenter – drums, percussion, backing vocals

== Discography ==
Title	Release	Label	Name
Man with Gun Kills Three!	1998	She's an Anchor	as Loudermilk
The Red Record	2002	DreamWorks	as Loudermilk
Gosling EP	2004	The Control Group	as Gosling
Here Is...	2006	V2	as Gosling

Videography

- "Mr. Skeleton Wings" (2006)
- "Stealing Stars" (2006)
