= Hollow Moon (Bad Wolf) =

Single by Awolnation

from the album Run
- Released: January 26, 2015
- Recorded: 2014
- Genre: Electronic rock; alternative rock; industrial rock; dance-rock
- Length: 4:18
- Label: Red Bull
- Songwriter: Aaron Bruno
- Producer: Aaron Bruno

Awolnation singles chronology
"Kill Your Heroes" (2013)	"Hollow Moon (Bad Wolf)" (2015)	"I Am" (2015)

Music video
- "Hollow Moon (Bad Wolf)" on YouTube

"Hollow Moon (Bad Wolf)" is a song by American rock band Awolnation. It was released as the lead single from their second studio album Run (2015).

== Background ==
The song became their first number-one hit on the Billboard Alternative Songs chart in early 2015. Band frontman Aaron Bruno has stated in interviews that he wishes the album track "Windows" would have been the first single, but the choice of the first single was a collaborative effort between the record company and himself and he found it easiest to just work to a middle ground.

Lyrically, the song has been described as being about the band's fear of failure and the dark path Bruno has traveled through his career to achieve success. It was written in a key of C Major and primarily has a tempo of 120 BPM.

== Music video ==
The video for "Hollow Moon (Bad Wolf)" was shot in one take by director Hayley Young in Seattle, WA. It was uploaded to the Red Bull Records' YouTube page on January 26, 2015. The video starts showing few actors and then the camera locks on frontman Aaron Bruno, it becomes focused on him throughout the video, capturing his movements, and correlation of facial expressions in regards to the lyrics. Bruno then walks into a sea of people, as the electro rock element implements several scenes, and he is seen dancing casually as he continues to walk and sing.

== Track listings ==
1. "Hollow Moon (Bad Wolf)" – 4:18
2. "Hollow Moon (Bad Wolf)" [Unlimited Gravity Remix] – 4:59
3. "Hollow Moon (Bad Wolf)" [Goshfather & Jinco Remix] – 4:00

== Charts ==
=== Weekly charts ===
Weekly chart performance for "Hollow Moon (Bad Wolf)"
Chart (2015)	Peak position
Canada Rock (Billboard)	11
US Bubbling Under Hot 100 (Billboard)	25
US Hot Rock & Alternative Songs (Billboard)	11
US Rock & Alternative Airplay (Billboard)	4

=== Year-end charts ===
Year-end chart performance for "Hollow Moon (Bad Wolf)"
Chart (2015)	Position
US Hot Rock Songs (Billboard)	36
US Rock Airplay (Billboard)	20
