= Eric Stenman =

American record producer, engineer and mixer

- Origin: Los Angeles, California, United States
- Genres: Alternative rock, indie rock, post-punk, hardcore punk, metal, electronic
- Occupations: Record producer, mixer, audio engineer, guitarist
- Years active: 1993–present
- Website: www.ericstenman.com

Eric Stenman is an American record producer, engineer and mixer. He has recorded projects with The Barbarians of California, AWOLNATION, Will Haven, Irontom, Thrice, Senses Fail, Saves The Day, Deftones, Far, Gameface, M.I.A., Dashboard Confessional, Lovedrug, Tokyo Police Club, Earth Crisis, Snapcase, Strife, and many more.

Stenman grew up in Sacramento, CA and got his start playing guitar and/or bass in the bands Tinfed, Elegy, and Bureau of the Glorious. Stenman engineered his first sessions at John Baccigaluppi's (of TapeOp Magazine) Enharmonik Studios.

From 2007 to 2017, Stenman was the Studio Manager/Chief Engineer at Red Bull Studios – Los Angeles. From 2017 to the present, Stenman has overseen AWOLNATION's recording studio in Malibu, California.

In 2023, Stenman formed The Barbarians of California with Aaron Bruno of AWOLNATION. The band released their first single, "Dopamine Prophecy", on February 9, 2024.

== Discography ==
=== 2025 ===
- Demon Hunter - There Was a Light Here – mixing on the song "There Was a Light Here"

=== 2024 ===
- The Barbarians of California - Dopamine Prophecy - (2024) - Guitar, Bass, Producer, Engineer, Mixer
- Awolnation - The Phantom Five - Two Twenty Five Music (2024) - Guitar, Bass, Mixer, Engineer
- Grace McKagan - Angeline - (2024) - Mixer
- Pancha - Jupiter In Virgo (single) - Mixer, Engineer

=== 2023 ===
- Awolnation - Candy Pop (EP) - Better Noise Records (2023) - Guitar, Bass, Mixer, Engineer
- Masked Wolf - Dark Matter ft. AWOLNATION - Teamwrk Records (2023) - Additional Engineering

=== 2022 ===
- Awolnation - My Echo, My Shadow, My Covers, and Me - Better Noise Records (2022) - Mixer, Engineer
- Grace McKagan - Heart of Hearts - (2022) - Mixer

=== 2021 ===
- Earth Crisis, Snapcase, & Strife - The Return Of The California Takeover - WAR Records (2021) - Producer, Engineer, Mixer
- Grace McKagan - One You Love - (2021) - Mixer

=== 2020 ===
- Awolnation - Angel Miners & The Lightning Riders - Better Noise Records (2020) - Mixer, Engineer
- Flawes - Highlights - Red Bull Records (2020) - Mixer
- Horseneck - Fever Dream - (2020) - Mixer, Mastering
- The Score - Carry On - Republic Records (2020) - Engineer

=== 2019 ===
- The Frights - Live At The Observatory - Epitaph Records (2019) - Mixer, Engineer
- Blaqk Audio - Only Things We Love - Kobalt Music Group (2019) - Mixer
- Death Valley High - Duel - minusHEAD Records (2019) - Additional Production, Mixer, Engineer
- Gameface – IOU1 – Revelation Records (2019) – Producer, Mixer, Engineer

=== 2018 ===
- Awolnation – Here Come The Runts – (2018) – Red Bull Records (2015) – Mixer, Engineer

=== 2017 ===
- Irontom – Partners – Another Century Records (2017) – Mixer, Engineer
- Daniel Caesar – Freudian – Golden Child Records (2016) – Engineer ** (GRAMMY NOMINATED - Best R&B Album)
- Jeff Caudill – Reset The Sun – Revelation Records (2017) – Mixer, Engineer
- The Aces – I Don't Lke Being Honest – Red Bull Records (2017) – Mixer
- Petyr – Petyr – Outer Battery Records (2017) – Mixer, Engineer
- Kali Uchis – "Tyrant" – Virgin/EMI Records (2017) – Engineer
- Daniel Brandt – Eternal Something – Erased Tapes Records (2017) – Engineer

=== 2016 ===
- Warm Brew – Diagnosis – Red Bull Records (2016) – Engineer
- Daniel Caesar Featuring Kali Uchis – "Get You" – Golden Child Records (2016) – Engineer ** (GRAMMY NOMINATED - Best R&B Performance)

=== 2015 ===
- Awolnation – RUN – (2015) – Red Bull Records (2015) – Mixer, Engineer
- Fifty Shades of Grey: Original Motion Picture Soundtrack – (2015) – Mixer, Engineer
- Senses Fail – Pull The Thorns From Your Heart – Pure Noise Records (2015) – Mixing, Engineering
- Yacht – I Thought The Future Would Be Cooler – Downtown Records (2015) – Engineer

=== 2014 ===
- ††† Crosses – ††† – Sumerian Records (2014) – Mix Engineer
- Gameface – Now Is What Matters Now – Equal Vision Records (2014) – Producer, Mixer, Engineer
- Twin Forks – Twin Forks – Dine Alone Records (2014) – Mastering

=== 2013 ===
- Senses Fail – Renacer – Workhorse Music/Vagrant Records (2013) – Mixing, Engineering
- Iron Man 3: Heroes Fall – Music Inspired by the Motion Picture – Hollywood Records (2013) – Mixing, Engineering
- Injustice: Gods Among Us – The Album – WaterTower Music (2013) – Mixing, Engineering
- UZ – Balltrap Muzic Vol. 1 – Topshelf x Bloodcompany (2013) – Engineering, Mastering
- Party Supplies – Tough Love – Fool's Gold Records (2013) – Engineering

=== 2012 ===
- Thrice – Anthology – Workhorse Music/Vagrant Records (2012) – Mixing, Mastering
- Edward Sharpe & The Magnetic Zeros – One Love To Another Single – (2012) – Vagrant Records – Mastering
- Frankenweenie Unleashed! – Original Soundtrack – Walt Disney Records (2012) – Engineer, Mixer
- Your Favorite Trainwreck – Your Favorite Trainwreck – (2012) Revelation Records – Producer, Mixer, Engineer
- School Of Seven Bells – Kiss Them For Me Single – (2012) Vagrant Records (2012) – Mastering
- Boys Like Girls – Crazy World E.P. – Columbia Records (2012) – 2nd Engineer, Digital Editing
- Brodka – LAX – Kayax (2012) – Engineer

=== 2011 ===
- Awolnation – Megalithic Symphony – (2011) – Red Bull Records – Co-Producer, Mixer, Engineer, Composer
- Tokyo Police Club – 10x10x10 – (2011) – Mom + Pop Music – Producer, Mixer, Engineer
- ††† Crosses – EP 1 – (2011) – Mix Engineer
- ††† Crosses – EP 2 – (2011) – Mix Engineer
- Batman: Arkham City – The Album – Original Soundtrack – (2011) Warner Brothers – Mix Engineer
- Innerpartysystem – Never Be Content – (2011) – Red Bull Records – Engineer
- Thrice – Major/Minor – (2011) – Vagrant Records – 2nd Engineer
- Death Valley High – Doom, In Full Bloom – Minus Head Records (2011) – Mixer (Days & Days, The Wait, Bring It Down, I Kissed A Girl)

=== 2010 ===
- M.I.A. – MAYA – (2010) – N.E.E.T./XL/Interscope – Engineer
- Far – At Night We Live – (2010) – Vagrant Records – Engineer
- Weezer – Hurley – (2010) – Epitaph Records – Assistant Engineer
- Katy Perry – Teenage Dream - Australia Deluxe Edition – (2010) – EMI Music – Engineer
- Keyshia Cole – Calling All Hearts – (2010) – Geffen Records – Engineer
- Eightfourseven – Lossless – (2010) – Minus Head Records – Producer, Engineer, Mixer
- Earl Greyhound – Suspicious Package – (2010) – Engineer
- Stereo Skyline – Stuck On Repeat – (2010) – Columbia Records – Engineer
- Envy On The Coast – Low Country – (2010) – Photo Finish Records – Assistant Engineer
- The Tank – We Were Lost – (2010) – Glass Presser/Bullion Records – Producer, Mixer, Engineer

=== 2009 ===
- Twin Atlantic – Vivarium – (2009) – Red Bull Records – Mixer, Additional Production and Engineering
- Armed For Apocalypse – Defeat – (2009) – Ironclad Recordings – Mixing
- We The Kings – Smile Kid – (2009) – S-Curve Records – Engineer
- Olivia Broadfield – Eyes Wide Open – (2009) – Vagrant Records – Mixing, Mastering
- Two Tongues – Two Tongues – (2009) – Vagrant Records – Mastering
- 3OH!3 – Want (Deluxe Edition) – (2009) Atlantic/Photo Finish Records – Engineer
- School Boy Humor – School Boy Humor – (2009) – Vagrant Records – Mixing, Mastering
- Desario – Zero Point Zero – (2009) – Darla Records – Mixing, Mastering

=== 2008 ===
- Thrice – MySpace: Transmissions Session – (2008) – Engineer, Mixer
- Lovedrug – The Suckerpunch Show – (2008) – The Militia Group – Engineer
- Bayside – Shudder – (2008) – Victory Records – Engineer
- Red Car Wire – Let's Never Get Older – (2008) – Universal Records – Mixer
- Forever The Sickest Kids – Underdog Alma Mater – (2008) – Universal Records – Engineer
- From Autumn To Ashes – Live At Looney Tunes – (2008) – Vagrant Records – Mastering
- Augustana – Live/Acoustic: Exclusive Tracks for iTunes – (2008) – Epic Records – Mixing, Mastering
- The Anniversary – Devil On Our Side: Rarities & B-Sides – (2008) – Vagrant Records – Mastering
- The Cab – Whisper War – (2008) – Fueled By Ramen Records – Engineer
- Thrice – Come All Ye Weary E.P. – (2008) – Vagrant Records – Mastering

=== 2007 ===
- Saves The Day – Under The Boards – (2007) – Vagrant Records – Producer, Mixer, Engineer
- The Comas – Spells – Vagrant Records (2007) – Mixer, Additional Engineering
- Dashboard Confessional – Dusk And Summer (Deluxe Edition) – (2007) – Vagrant/Interscope Records – Mixer
- Hellogoodbye – Live Performance Tracks for MTV and B-Sides – (2007) – Drive Thru Records – Mixer
- The Bled – "Asleep on The Frontlines (Appliantz Remix)" – Resident Evil: Extinction – *Original Soundtrack – Lakeshore Records (2007) – Remix, Additional Production, Bass Guitar
- The Hold Steady – Live At Fingerprints – Vagrant Records (2007) – Mastering
- Death Valley High – The Similarities of the Loveless and the Undead – Attinuator Records (2007) – Producer, Engineer, Mixer, Bass Guitar

=== 2006 ===
- Dashboard Confessional – AOL Session – (2006) – Mixer
- Dashboard Confessional – FUSE 7th Ave Drop – First aired on 6/27/06 – Mixer
- Senses Fail – Still Searching (Deluxe Edition) – Vagrant Records (2006) – Producer, Engineer, Mixer
- Good Charlotte – 2006 Demos – Epic Records (2006) – Engineer, Mixer
- Saves The Day – Bug Sessions: Volume One – (2006) – Producer, Mixer, Engineer
- Say Anything (Featuring Chris Conley) – Paupers Peasants Princes and *Kings: The Songs of Bob Dylan – Doghouse Records (2006) – Mixer
- The Abominable Iron Sloth – Self Titled – Goodfellow Records (2006) – Mixer, Mastering
- dios (malos) – Album EP – Startime International Records (2006) – Mastering
- Eightfourseven – Silent Raid – (2006) – Producer, Mixer, Engineer

=== 2005 ===
- Deftones – B-Sides & Rarities – Maverick Records (2005) – Producer, Mixer, Engineer
- Senses Fail – Let It Enfold You (Deluxe Edition) – Vagrant Records (2005) – Mixer
- Saves The Day – Tony Hawk: American Wasteland Soundtrack – Vagrant Records (2005) – producer, Mixer, Engineer
- Senses Fail – Taste Of Chaos: Live – Image Entertainment (2005) – Mixer
- California Oranges – Souvenirs – Darla Records (2005) – Mixer

=== 2004 ===
- Ghostride – Cobra Sunrise – Distruktor Records/Golf Records/Plastichead (2004) – Producer, Mixer, Engineer
- Training for Utopia – Technical Difficulties – Tooth & Nail Records (2004) – Producer, Engineer, Mixer

=== 2003 ===
- Gameface – Four To Go – Doghouse Records (2003) – Producer, Engineer, Mixer
- Leisure – Leisure – DreamWorks Records (2003) – Producer, Mixer, Engineer
- Ghostride – Ghostride E.P. – Distruktor Records (2003) – Producer, Mixer, Engineer
- No Motiv – Lola E.P. – Vagrant Records (2003) – Mastering
- Folk Implosion – "Leaving It Up To Me – Radio Edit" – iMusic (2003) – Editing, Mastering
- California Oranges – Oranges & Pineapples – Darla Records (2003) – Producer, Mixer, Engineer
- MC Lyte – "Ride Wit Me" EA Sports Mix – iMusic (2003) – Mixer, Engineer

=== 2002 ===
- Fall Silent – Drunken Violence – Revelation Records (2002) – Producer, Mixer, Engineer
- Tinfed – Designated Rivals – Attinuator Records (2002) – Producer, Engineer, Mixer, Remixer

=== 2001 ===
- Will Haven – Carpe Diem – Revelation Records/Music For Nations (2001) – Producer, Mixer, Engineer

=== 2000 ===
- Tinfed – Tried + True – Third Rail/Hollywood Records (2000) – Guitar, Bass
- Original Soundtrack – Mission: Impossible 2 – Hollywood Records (2000) – Guitar, Bass
- Flashpoint – On the Verge – Atomic Pop Records (2000) – Producer, Engineer, Mixer
- The Revolution Smile – At War With Plastic – Animation Records (2000) – Engineer

=== 1999 ===
- Far – "Monkey Gone to Heaven" – Glue Factory Records (1999) – Producer, Mixer, Engineer
- Luscious Jackson "Nervous Breakthrough (Remix) " Grand Royal Records (1999) – Remixer, Guitar
- Will Haven – WHVN – Revelation Records/Music For Nations (1999) – Producer, Programming, Engineer
- Countervail – The Most Abused Word – New Age Records (1999) – Producer, Mixer, Engineer
- Percy Howard, Vernon Reid, & Trey Gunn – Incidental Seductions – Materiali Sonori Records (1999) – Engineer
- The Tank – There's No "I" In Band – Dr. Strange Records (1999) – Producer, Mixer, Engineer
- Training for Utopia – Throwing a Wrench... – Tooth & Nail Records (1999) – Producer, Engineer, Mixer

=== 1998 ===
- Skinny Puppy – Remix Dys Temper – Nettwerk Records (1998) – Guitar, Remixer
- Training for Utopia & Zao – Split [EP] – Tooth & Nail Records (1998) – Producer, Mixer, Engineer
- Amber Inn – All Roads Lead Home – Ebullition Records (1998) – Producer, Mixer, Engineer

=== 1997 ===
- Far (with Deftones) – Soon – Immortal/Epic Records (1997) – Producer, Mixer, Engineer
- Far – "All Go Down" – Original Soundtrack – God Money – V2 Records (1997) – Producer, Mixer, Engineer
- Knapsack – "Less Than" – Don't Forget to Breathe – Crank Records (1997) – Producer, Mixer, Engineer
- Will Haven – El Diablo – Revelation Records (1997) Producer, Engineer, Mixer

=== 1996 ===
- Far – Tin Cans with Strings to You – Immortal/Epic Records (1996) – Engineer
- Tinfed – Hypersonic Hyperphonic – Cargo Records (1996) – Bass, Programming, Producer, Engineer, Mixer
- Zoinks! – Stranger Anxiety – Dr. Strange Records (1996) – Producer, Engineer, Mixer
- Boneback – "Starsky Solo Project" – Coffee Records- (1996) – Producer, Mixer Engineer

=== 1995 ===
- 7 Seconds – The Music, The Message – Immortal/Epic Records (1995) – Mixer, Engineer
- Vomit Launch – Not Even Pretty – Teenbeat Records (1995) Mixer, Mastering

=== 1994 ===
- Far – In The Isle, Yelling 7"; Rusty Nail Records (1994) – Producer, Mixer, Engineer

=== 1993 ===
- Tinfed – Synaptic Hardware – Primitech Releases (1993) – Bass Producer, Engineer, Mixer

== Sources ==
- Eric Stenman's official site
- https://tapeop.com/articles/by/eric-stenman
- Awolnation.com
- Allmusic.com
- Discogs.com
- Artistdirect.com
