= Under the Influence of Giants =

American former alternative rock band

- Origin: Los Angeles, California, U.S.
- Genres: Indie rock; indie pop; alternative rock; alternative dance; dance-punk
- Years active: 2004–2008
- Label: UTIOG Records
- Spinoff of: Home Town Hero
- Past members: Aaron Bruno; Drew Stewart; David Amezcua; Jamin Wilcox; Erin Kathleen Logan; Josh Moreau

Under the Influence of Giants (sometimes abbreviated UTIOG) was an American alternative rock band from Los Angeles, California. They released their major label debut album in August 2006, which was a number one hit on the Top Heatseekers chart. Among their influences are the Beatles, The Who, Led Zeppelin, the Bee Gees, Prince, among others. UTIOG have performed on Last Call with Carson Daly and Jimmy Kimmel Live! as well as opening for acts such as Aerosmith, Darrell DMC, Crowded House, Angels and Airwaves and The Sounds.

== History ==
Aaron Bruno and Drew Stewart formed a band called Home Town Hero and signed to the now defunct Maverick Records from 2002-2004. In 2004, after several member changes and label woes, the band went on hiatus. Around this time, Bruno and Stewart reconnected with childhood friend and former Audiovent drummer Jamin Wilcox and began to play music together. All three had experienced turmoil with major record labels and wanted to create music on their own terms. The music from these sessions would later be recorded and released free over the internet under the album title Bitch City. While the band was still called Home Town Hero at this point, they felt the evolution of the music did not fit the name so they dropped the name. Since Home Town Hero was still contractually obligated to Maverick, the label held the legal rights to Home Town Hero's music. The members of the band quit the label, forced to leave their music behind.

The band continued under the name "Under the Influence of Giants", a name meant to reflect their continuous struggle to operate free of authority. They recruited keyboardist Katie Logan and bassist David Amezuca and began to play shows in the Los Angeles area in mid-2005, selling out venues like the Roxy and Key Club several times. In the spring of 2006, after a short West Coast tour, Logan decided to amicably leave the band and created the duo Katie and Katie with a friend.

In the winter of 2005 the band signed with Island Records, and released their debut in summer of 2006 on that label.

In November 2006, they headlined the halftime show at Major League Soccer's MLS Cup championship game at Pizza Hut Park in Frisco, Texas.

They have headlined and sold out numerous club tours in the US and UK. They have also gone on tour in the UK and Europe with The Sounds, as well as opening for them on select dates in the United States.

Aaron Bruno is currently in the band Awolnation, and David Amezcua as well as Drew Stewart were in the band until each left. They released their debut EP Back from Earth in 2010 on iTunes. Jamin Wilcox has released a solo album on iTunes. David Amezcua is currently in the band Hotstreets, who released their self-titled debut album in 2010 on iTunes.

== Discography ==
=== As Home Town Hero ===
- Home Town Hero LP (2002)
- Bitch City LP (2004)

=== As Under the Influence of Giants ===
- Heaven Is Full EP (2006)
- Under the Influence of Giants LP (2006) U.S. No. 134

=== Singles ===
- "Mama's Room" (2006)
- "In the Clouds" (2006)

== In other media ==
- The song "Robbers" from the Bitch City LP is featured in MVP Baseball 2004 by EA Sports.
- A few songs from the Under the Influence of Giants album were played at a Halloween party scene in an episode ("The Middle-Earth Paradigm") of The Big Bang Theory.
- The song "Hi Lo" was featured in "Credit Where Credit's Due", an episode of the American drama television series Veronica Mars.
