= Under the Influence of Giants (album) =

Studio album by Under the Influence of Giants
- Released: August 8, 2006
- Genre: Alternative rock; alternative dance; dance-punk
- Length: 42:25
- Label: Island

Under the Influence of Giants is the self-titled debut studio album by Under the Influence of Giants, released on August 8, 2006. AllMusic gave it 4/5 stars, calling it "a fun, slightly trashy affair" and praising the musical versatility. PopMatters rated it 3/10, commenting that "there's just not enough substance here to qualify as either bad or good. Their debut is so derivative that the overall effect is little more substantial than gossamer."

== Track listing ==
1. "Ah Ha" - 2:58
2. "Got Nothing" - 3:25
3. "In the Clouds" - 3:43
4. "Stay Illogical" - 4:16
5. "Mama's Room" - 3:52
6. "Heaven Is Full" - 4:56
7. "I Love You" - 3:25
8. "Against All Odds" - 3:10
9. "Lay Me Down" - 3:41
10. "Faces" - 3:39
11. "Meaningless Love" - 5:19
12. "Can't Stand" (iTunes Download only) - 3:35
13. "Anna Marie" (Rhapsody Download only) - 3:21
14. "On My Own" (Bonus Track on 2-disc limited edition) - 3:09
15. "Mama's Room [Richard Vission Rerub Edit] (Bonus Track on 2-disc limited edition) - 3:32

== Personnel ==
- Aaron Bruno: vocals
- Drew Stewart: guitar
- David Amezcua: bass
- Jamin Wilcox: drums, keyboard
- Brad Smith: Production
- Cristopher Thorn: Production
