= The Barbarians of California =

American rock band

- Origin: Los Angeles, California, U.S.
- Genres: Post-hardcore; alternative metal; hard rock
- Years active: 2024–present
- Label: Two Twenty Five Music
- Spinoff of: Awolnation
- Members: Aaron Bruno; Linden Reed; Eric Stenman; David Amezca; Zach Irons
- Past members: Isaac Carpenter
- Website: thebarbariansofcalifornia.com

The Barbarians of California is an American post-hardcore band from Los Angeles, formed in 2024. Started by Aaron Bruno, it is a spinoff of Awolnation.

== History ==
The band was formed by Aaron Bruno, sound engineer Eric Stenman, current Awolnation lead guitarist Zach Irons, and former Awolnation drummer Isaac Carpenter. During the COVID-19 pandemic, Eric Stenman showed Bruno some guitar riffs he had been working on, and as the pandemic ended, "the stars aligned perfectly for the duo to get together and kickstart (the) hardcore band they had always wanted to do." They are influenced from artists such as Slayer, Metallica, Iron Maiden, Queens of the Stone Age, and Nirvana. They have also been inspired by psychedelic rock, pop, 1990s hip hop, and other artists from Bruno's youth. The band intends to encourage people to question authority through their music, though Bruno stated that the Barbarians ultimately are not focused on conveying a message or trying to change the world. They are also characterized by tongue-in-cheek lyrics.

In June 2024, the Barbarians of California released a single titled "Far Out, Bro", which featured vocals from Daryl Taberski of the band Snapcase. The band had released two singles earlier in the year, titled "Dopamine Prophecy" and "Where Are the Punks?!?!" In that same year, the band released its debut album, And Now I'm Just Gnashing My Teeth, which was described as having an "experimental edge", and blending "hardcore with a Nu-Metal sound". Tim McIlrath from Rise Against makes a guest vocalist appearance on the album.

At the end of February 2025, the Barbarians of California released a music video for the track "Mr. Mircophone". In March 2025, Isaac Carpenter left the band to join Guns N' Roses. Following this, Linden Reed joined.

In the summer of 2025, the Barbarians of California released a single titled "MODERN FASHION". The band would play at Riot Fest and Warped Tour that year.

Following a tour where The Barbarians of California played as support for Deftones, in October 2025, they released a single titled "PSEUDO INTELLECTUALS ARE HATING ON MY BAND!!! (pure power)", which featured guest vocals from Keith Buckley.

In August 2026, the band released its second album, MEGATONS. A single from the album, "The Gnarlycore Class", was released with a music video in May of that year. Kerrang! rated the album a 4/5, stating that it was "overflowing with riffs, brimming with swagger and groove, and drowning in both piss and vinegar."

The Barbarians of California played as an opener for Guns N' Roses on select dates of their 2026 North America tour. The band previously played shows at the festivals Rocklahoma and Louder Than Life.

== Members ==
=== Current members ===
- Aaron Bruno (lead vocals, guitar)
- Linden Reed (drums)
- Eric Stenman (guitar, production)
- David Amezcua (bass)
- Zach Irons (lead guitar)

=== Former Members ===
- Isaac Carpenter (drums) (2024–2025)

== Discography ==
=== Studio Albums ===
- And Now I'm Just Gnashing My Teeth (2024)
- Megatons (2026)

=== Singles ===
Title	Year	Album	Label
"Dopamine Prophecy"	2024	And Now I'm Just Gnashing My Teeth	Two Twenty Five Music
"Where Are the Punks?!?!"	2024	And Now I'm Just Gnashing My Teeth	Two Twenty Five Music
"Far Out, Bro" (featuring Daryl Taberski)	2024	And Now I'm Just Gnashing My Teeth	Two Twenty Five Music
"Bazooka"	2024	And Now I'm Just Gnashing My Teeth	Two Twenty Five Music
"Modern Fashion"	2025	Non-album singles	Two Twenty Five Music
"PSEUDO INTELLECTUALS ARE HATING ON MY BAND!!! (pure power)" (featuring Keith Buckley)	2025	Non-album singles	Two Twenty Five Music
"Bomb to a Knife Fight"	2026	MEGATONS	Two Twenty Five Music
"Vanilla Latte"	2026	MEGATONS	Two Twenty Five Music
"The Gnarlycore Class"	2026	MEGATONS	Two Twenty Five Music
