= Run (Awolnation album) =

Studio album by Awolnation
- Released: March 17, 2015
- Recorded: 2013–2014
- Studios: Dragonfly Creek (Malibu); Red Bull (Los Angeles)
- Genres: Alternative rock; electronic rock; synth-pop
- Length: 55:20
- Label: Red Bull
- Producer: Aaron Bruno

Awolnation chronology
Megalithic Symphony (2011)	Run (2015)	Here Come the Runts (2018)

Singles from Run
- 1. "Hollow Moon (Bad Wolf)" Released: January 26, 2015; 2. "Run" Released: March 5, 2015; 3. "Windows" Released: May 15, 2015; 4. "I Am" Released: July 7, 2015; 5. "KOOKSEVERYWHERE!!!" Released: September 20, 2015; 6. "Woman Woman" Released: December 9, 2015; 7. "Lie Love Live Love" Released: April 21, 2016

Run is the second studio album by American rock band Awolnation. It was released on March 17, 2015 through Red Bull Records. It was the band's first studio album in four years, succeeding Megalithic Symphony (2011).

Work on the album was primarily done by band front man Aaron Bruno. He played the majority of instruments on the album and served as the sole producer and songwriter. Throughout 2013 and 2014, Bruno recorded the album between Dragonfly Creek Recording in Malibu, California and Red Bull Studios in Los Angeles.

The album was first announced on January 25, 2015. On the same day, "Hollow Moon (Bad Wolf)" was released as the lead single. The title track was later released on March 5 as the second single. Following the album's release, five other singles were released; "Windows", "I Am", "KOOKSEVERYWHERE!!!", "Woman Woman", and "Lie Love Live Love".

On June 27, 2025, the band re-released the album for its 10th anniversary with six new tracks.

== Background ==
In an interview with MTV News on May 11, 2012, Awolnation front man Aaron Bruno commented on the follow-up to Megalithic Symphony, saying "I think the next record will be a little more raw, and a little more aggro, and a little stranger, but still have the nursery-rhyme feel of melody, because that's the only way I know how to write. I've always been the underdog my whole life, and the guys in my band, we all came up in the same situation, so this success is totally new and foreign for us, so I want to maintain the hunger of being the underdog and never feel complacent with the success and always want to reach more ears. Not necessarily to make money, but because I feel the music's important." Red Bull Records announced that the new album would be released in 2014 but this did not happen. A new song entitled "KOOKSEVERYWHERE!!!" was played at the Rock am Ring festival. Aaron worked on new material from mid-2013 until the end of 2014. After months of touring, Aaron announced in an interview at Voodoo Music Experience 2014 that the new album would be released mid-March 2015. After various weeks of teasing new material on the official Facebook page of the band, they officially released the first single from Run, "Hollow Moon (Bad Wolf)". The album is also the first to feature Isaac Carpenter on drums, replacing former drummer, Hayden Scott.

In a retrospective interview in May 2016, Aaron described Run as a tricky record to make because it was the first time he was actually giving something back to the longtime fans of a band he had been a part of, specifically AWOLNATION, something he had never done before with his other bands. Compared to Run, Bruno describes his earlier record Megalithic Symphony as crazy, very ambitious and something he had been wanting to do for a long time. He even mentions that he believed no one would listen to it. Aaron describes the creation of "Run" as an immense pressure to make something as equally passionate as "Megalithic Symphony", and something the diehard fans wouldn't be let down by. "Looking back now, it has been a year, and this record has been very important to a lot of people, so I'm satisfied." Aaron also mentions that it's nice to have more songs he can pull from to make a setlist for live shows. "During the first record's tour cycle, we started playing headlining shows early on and I didn't know if we had enough material to fill the hour and 15 minute slot, but now we do and we can switch it up."

Comparing his work to that of Radiohead's, Bruno mentions that he didn't expect to come back with a "Sail 2.0", but rather a continuation of his previous record. "Everyone expected Radiohead to come back with "Creep 2.0", but no, they didn't. Instead they came back with The Bends which everyone loved as much as Pablo Honey. I like to think Run is my The Bends."

== Writing and production ==
"Run" was produced by Aaron Bruno and engineered/mixed by Eric Stenman. The album was recorded and mixed at Dragonfly Creek Recording in Malibu, California and Red Bull Studios in Los Angeles, California. Aaron has mentioned that a lot of times, he does not necessarily know what the songs he writes are about but that they take a life on a life of their own and reveal themselves to him. In a retrospective interview in May 2016, Aaron talks about the writing process behind "Run": "I kind of just let it flow out naturally, and not let one particular thing get in the way of the other." Bruno explained that upon writing "Hollow Moon (Bad Wolf)" he felt that specific song was a great way to introduce himself back into the music world after riding the success of 'Sail.' "(Hollow Moon) was written piece by piece, and kind of started as a softer, more out there sound, but once I got into the studio and put real drums on it, it became a heavier sounding song. Originally I was kind of jet-lagged when I came up with it as the sun was about to rise, the moon was still over the ocean at the time, and I couldn't sleep. That was the birth of that song."

Speaking on the catchiness of his songs, Bruno has said he does not write songs and expect them to be a hit: "I write pretty catchy songs for better or for worse, so I know that once I turn in a record there is a lot of options and different ways to go with the commercial aspect of the process I guess, and with the first record I thought 'Sail' would be the last song to ever get on the radio, so that is when I knew that maybe AWOLNATION it's going to be a different direction then the traditional format of radio or a major label system."

== Composition ==
Musically, Run is more diverse than the band's first album. The album's sound has been described as alternative rock, electronic rock, synth-pop, pop rock, pop, dance-pop and dance-rock. In various interviews, Aaron Bruno has stated the title track is about how people are human and are capable of doing very terrible things to one another. Speaking on the softness of "Fat Face" Aaron mentions that he believed it would be a great song to come after the intensity of "Run". "It's my way of saying, no matter what happens in life I still feel the same knee-jerk reactions and emotions that I felt when I was younger, so regardless of the ups and downs, you sort of always go back to who you are. As much as I'd like to think people change over time, I do think people can to a certain extent, I still have the same insecurities I had when I was a kid, in high school, or elementary school." Aaron has stated that "Woman Woman" is an anthem for being comfortable in your own skin, man or woman. In a live Facebook Q&A discussion, Aaron described "Drinking Lightning" as one of the more personal songs on the record, saying "it's sort of about really falling in-love with someone, the right person, and just being very protective and not wanting to mess it up."

== Promotion ==
The band began teasing new material being released on their official Facebook page. This included cards with segments of new lyrics, and a day countdown until the release of "Hollow Moon (Bad Wolf)". On January 26, the band officially released the single, with a video on Red Bull Records' YouTube page. It also impacted American alternative music radio stations that same day. The first promotional single, "Windows", was released on March 3. The title track, "Run", was subsequently released as the second promotional single on March 5. The second single, "I Am", was originally released as a lyric video on May 17. 2 months later, the official music video was released, and on July 7, it was released as a full-fledged single. On December 9, "Woman Woman" was also released as a single.

== Reception ==
Professional ratings
Aggregate scores
Source	Rating
Metacritic	68/100
Review scores
Source	Rating
AllMusic	3/5 stars
Alternative Press	4/5 stars
Billboard	3/5 stars
Exclaim!	4/10
Kerrang!	3/5 stars
The New Zealand Herald	3.5/5 stars
Q	4/5 stars
Rolling Stone	2.5/5 stars

Run has received generally positive but often polarized reviews. It currently holds a 68 out of 100 on Metacritic based on 6 critics, indicating "generally favorable reviews".

Calum Slingerland of Exclaim! wrote that Bruno's incredibly varied writing style made the listen "exhausting", concluding that "his mad dash in a myriad of different musical directions isn't well-suited to an hour-long record." However, April Siese of Glide Magazine contrarily describes the album as "approaching the listener like a particularly rewarding but difficult novel." The title track became an internet meme in 2016.

== Track listing ==
All tracks are written by Aaron Bruno

No.	Title	Length
1.	"Run"	4:01
2.	"Fat Face"	3:33
3.	"Hollow Moon (Bad Wolf)"	4:18
4.	"Jailbreak"	4:41
5.	"Kookseverywhere!!!"	4:07
6.	"I Am"	4:34
7.	"Headrest for My Soul"	2:08
8.	"Dreamers"	2:25
9.	"Windows"	3:37
10.	"Holy Roller"	3:58
11.	"Woman Woman"	3:37
12.	"Lie Love Live Love"	4:41
13.	"Like People, Like Plastic"	4:31
14.	"Drinking Lightning"	5:08
Total length:		55:20

Notes

- "Kookseverywhere!!!" is stylized in all caps

Run 10th Anniversary Edition tracks
No.	Title	Length
15.	"Found Atlas"	3:44
16.	"Actors Have No Shame"	2:52
17.	"Walking Away"	2:54
18.	"Somebody Let Me Know"	2:56
19.	"Hollow Moon (Bad Wolf) [Live]"	4:48
20.	"Windows (Kill The Noise Remix)"	3:15

== Personnel ==
Awolnation

- Aaron Bruno – vocals, synthesizer, drums, percussion, guitar, piano
- Kenny Carkeet – keyboards, backing vocals
- Isaac Carpenter – drums
- Zach Irons – guitar
- Marc Walloch – bass guitar

== Charts ==
Chart (2015)	Peak position
Austrian Albums (Ö3 Austria)	11
Canadian Albums (Billboard)	9
German Albums (Offizielle Top 100)	83
Swiss Albums (Schweizer Hitparade)	50
UK Albums (Official Charts)	137
US Billboard 200	17
US Top Alternative Albums (Billboard)	3
US Top Rock Albums (Billboard)	4

== Certifications ==
Region	Certification	Certified units/sales
Canada (Music Canada)	Gold	40,000^{‡}
^{‡} Sales+streaming figures based on certification alone.
