= Awolnation =

American rock band

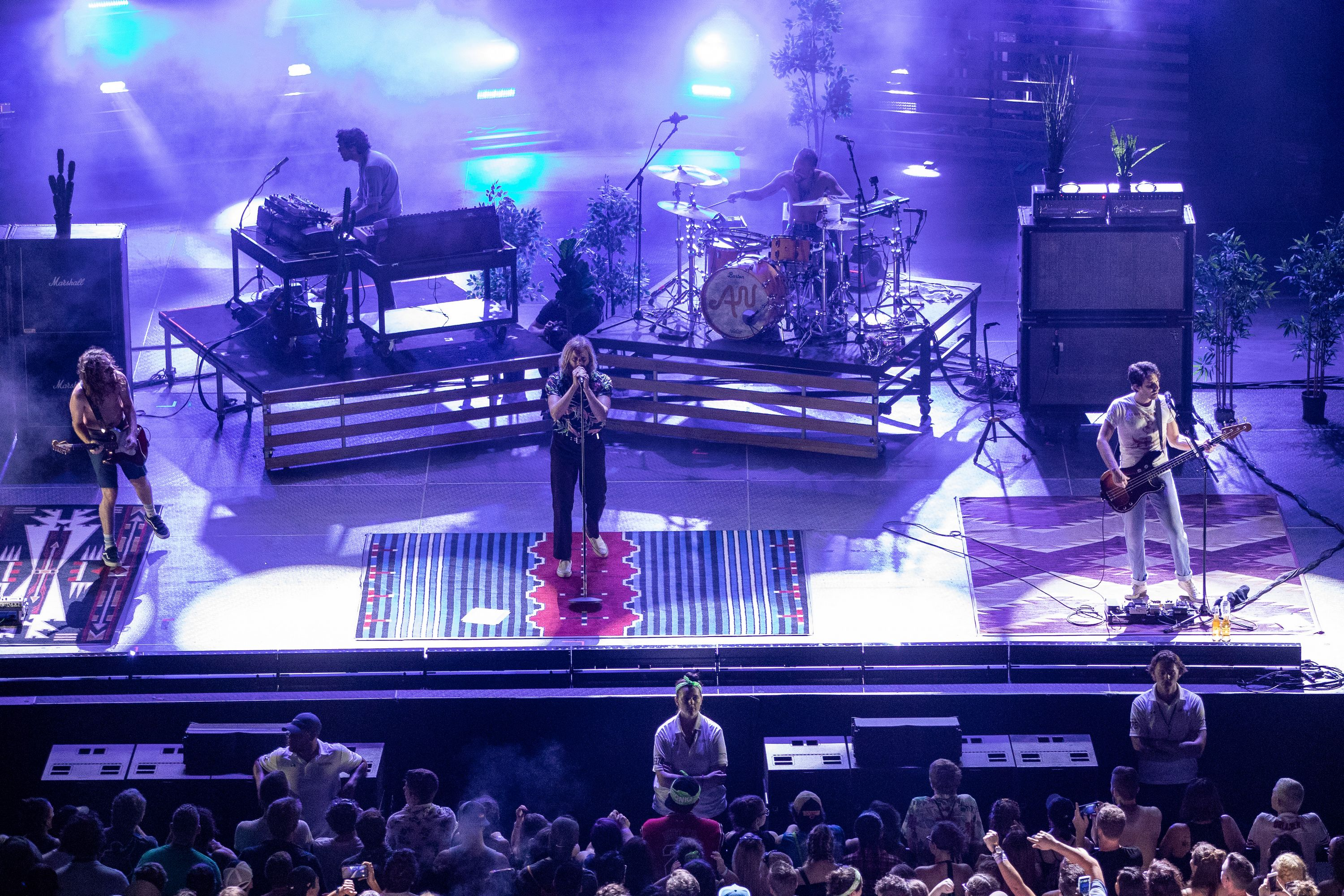
- Awolnation performing in 2018

Background information
- Origin: Los Angeles, California, U.S.
- Genres: Alternative rock; electronic rock; indie rock; electropop; pop rock; dance-rock
- Works: Awolnation discography
- Years active: 2009–present
- Labels: Two Twenty Five; Better Noise; Red Bull
- Spinoffs: The Barbarians of California
- Spinoff of: Under the Influence of Giants; Home Town Hero
- Members: Aaron Bruno; Zach Irons; Daniel Saslow; Josh Moreau; Linden Reed
- Past members: Jimmy Messer; Billy Mohler; Dave Amezcua; Christopher Thorn; Devin Hoffman; Hayden Scott; Drew Stewart; Kenny Carkeet; Marc Walloch; Michael Goldman; Isaac Carpenter
- Website: awolnationmusic.com

Awolnation (stylized as AWOLNATION) is an American rock band from Los Angeles formed and fronted by Aaron Bruno, formerly of Under the Influence of Giants, Home Town Hero, and Insurgence. The band is signed to Better Noise Music and formerly was signed to Red Bull Records. Their first EP, Back from Earth, was released on iTunes on May 18, 2010. They released their first studio album, Megalithic Symphony, on March 15, 2011; it featured their most notable hit, "Sail", which peaked at number 17 on the Billboard Hot 100, number 4 on the Billboard Rock Songs chart, and number 5 on the Billboard Alternative Songs chart.

On June 14, 2021, "Sail" became just the 57th song to be certified diamond by the RIAA and has sold 10,000,000 copies in the United States. As of February 29, 2016, the album has been certified platinum.

The band's second studio album, Run, was released on March 17, 2015. The band's third studio album, Here Come the Runts, was released on February 2, 2018. Their fourth studio album, Angel Miners & the Lightning Riders, was released on April 24, 2020. On May 6, 2022, the band released a covers album titled My Echo, My Shadow, My Covers, and Me. Their fifth studio album of original material, The Phantom Five, was released on August 30, 2024.

== History ==
=== Formation and Back from Earth (2009–2010) ===
Aaron Bruno was approached by Red Bull Records in 2009, asking if he wanted free use of the Red Bull recording studio in Los Angeles. He recorded a few songs in the studio and ultimately signed with the label, calling it more of a "partnership", and was allowed to make the recordings that he wanted. Bruno was with numerous bands before he created Awolnation, including Home Town Hero with Drew Stewart and Under the Influence of Giants with Dave Amezcua. Bruno writes all of his songs himself, but confides in close friends and family or respected artists for guidance. The band released their first EP Back from Earth on May 18, 2010.

The name Awolnation is derived from Bruno's high school nickname. In an interview with Kristin Houser of the LA Music Blog, he stated that he "would leave without saying goodbye" because it was just easier, so that's where the name AWOL (slang from the military acronym for Absent Without Leave) came from."

=== Megalithic Symphony (2011–2014) ===
The band released their debut album Megalithic Symphony digitally on March 15, 2011 through Red Bull Records. Megalithic Symphony features a total of 14 tracks, including the singles "Sail", "Not Your Fault", and "Kill Your Heroes". Bonus tracks for the album include "Shoestrings", "Swinging from the Castles" and "I've Been Dreaming".

The band's first single, "Sail", peaked at number 10 on the U.S. Billboard Rock Songs and has gone platinum in the US and double platinum in Canada. "Sail" was featured in the episode "Whiskey Tango Foxtrot" of CBS's television show The Good Wife, commercials for the Fox television show House, Nokia's commercial for Lumia and PT's commercial for 4G LTE, and is also the background music for Under Armour's "Are You from Here" commercial, featuring Derrick Williams. "Sail" was covered by Macy Gray (included on her album Covered) and by DevilDriver (on their album Winter Kills). "Sail" was also used for a Sonya Tayeh routine in So You Think You Can Dance season 9, episode 6; at the end of the episode "Dog Soldiers" in season 1 of Longmire; and featured on the soundtrack of the thriller horror movie Playback released in March 2012, as well as featured throughout the film Disconnect (2013). The track gained even greater exposure when it was featured during BMW's Olympic Opening Ceremony and in commercial spots throughout the Olympic broadcasts. "Sail" was used during CBC Hockey Night's opening tease in Canada on February 18, 2012, prior to a game between the Vancouver Canucks and Toronto Maple Leafs. It was also used as of March 2013 in commercials for History Channel's new series, Vikings. "Sail" peaked at no. 17 on the US Billboard Hot 100, 27 on the Australian charts, 33 on the New Zealand charts and 17 on the UK Singles Chart. "Sail" was also used on wingsuit flyer Jeb Corliss's YouTube film "Grinding the Crack", which as of October 2021 has had over 34 million views.

Another of the band's songs, "Burn It Down", is featured in the Sons of Anarchy episode "To Be, Act 1", and is also one of the in-game radio songs in Saints Row IV. Also one of their songs "Guilty Filthy Soul" has been featured in the episode "Break On Through" of The CW television show The Vampire Diaries. The band's songs "Sail" and "All I Need" are featured in the season 1 episode "Gun!" of Common Law. The band's song "Sail" was also featured in the season 4 episode "Hot for Teacher" of Pretty Little Liars. "Kill Your Heroes" is featured at the beginning and the end of season 3, episode 2 of the Canadian TV series Rookie Blue, and the remix of "Sail" together with Innerpartysystem was played in episode 8 of the same season. It was also used in the episode "The Wake-Up Bomb" of Covert Affairs. Furthermore, "All I Need" was used in the season finale of the NBC show Whitney and "Kill Your Heroes" is in Season 4 episode 9 of The 100.

On June 6, 2012, the band released an Extended Play, I've Been Dreaming, for free download on their official website. The extended play includes 3 unreleased songs, ("I've Been Dreaming", "Shoestrings", "Swinging From The Castles") and recorded live versions of "Kill Your Heroes", "Not Your Fault", and "People" that they played in Toronto.

They released two new songs, "Thiskidsnotalright" and "Some Kind of Joke". "Some Kind of Joke" appears as the second song on the Iron Man 3: Heroes Fall – Music Inspired by the Motion Picture soundtrack. The track "Thiskidsnotalright" is featured in the video game Injustice: Gods Among Us. Beacon audio did a Kickstarter for a limited edition speaker. They released a Deluxe Edition of Megalithic Symphony on November 19, 2013 that includes "Thiskidsnotalright," "Some Kind Of Joke", "Everybody's Got a Secret", songs from their EP I've Been Dreaming, "MF", and several remixes of other songs from Megalithic Symphony. "Everybody's Got a Secret" was used in the soundtrack for the Disney film Frankenweenie in 2012.

Megalithic Symphony and Sail's immediate success exposed the band to fans of all different genres of music. They were starting to gain diehard fans by playing various music festivals and consistently touring. Between the years 2011 and 2014, Awolnation played 306 shows, 113 in the year 2012 alone, supporting the album and its singles.

=== Run and Christopher Thorn's return (2015–2016) ===
The band released their second studio album, Run, on March 17, 2015. The album received polarizing but positive reviews, and the band received its first Metacritic review; with the album getting an aggregated 68 out of 100, from 6 critics. The album's lead single, "Hollow Moon (Bad Wolf)", was released on January 26, 2015. The second single, "I Am", was released on July 7, 2015. The third single, "Woman Woman", was released on December 9, 2015.

On April 7, 2015, they made an appearance on Conan.

In September 2015, Bruno said that long-time guitarist Drew Stewart had left the band to spend time with his family. He was replaced by Irontom guitarist Zach Irons (son of former Red Hot Chili Peppers, Pearl Jam and Eleven drummer Jack Irons).

On December 1, 2015, Awolnation released a B-side track from Run named "Wichita Panama" for Red Bull Records "Red Bull 20-Before-16" December event. Later, in February 2016, Awolnation released the videoclip for the song "Woman Woman" for Red Bull Records.

In 2015, a music kit for the video game Counter Strike: Global Offensive was released called "I Am". The kit includes songs from both Run and Megalithic Symphony.

Awolnation would be an opening act along with PVRIS to Fall Out Boy’s tour, Wintour is Coming. They played February 26, 2016 through March 27, 2016.

On June 20, 2016, the band announced that it was cancelling many dates of its summer headlining tour so it could serve as the opening band for the Prophets of Rage tour. This announcement was met with consternation and upset by many of the band's fans, many of whom took to the band's Facebook page to express their anger at the fact that some ticket purchases were non-refundable.

On July 8, 2016, Awolnation released an alternate version of Run named Run (Beautiful Things), where the repeating lyric "capable of doing terrible things" is replaced with "capable of doing beautiful things." The music video for this shows a person in a cloak with the AWOL helmet holding a purple lantern while emerging from the sea. At times, the scene cuts away to a mermaid with the person as she swims away at the lyric "run."

During the tour with Prophets of Rage, Zach Irons left the tour during the second leg to tour with IRONTOM. In his absence, former guitarist Christopher Thorn replaced Irons on a handful of shows starting in Tampa on October 1, 2016. This would mark the first time Thorn played with the band since around March 2012.

Awolnation toured over 80+ plus dates in support of the album Run including multiple festival appearances and their own headlining tour that brought the band to Europe and South America.

In a late 2016 interview, Bruno said he had a vision for the next album's sound. "I think people are getting really burnt out on hearing robotic instrumentation..." He said guitar-driven songs should be brought back to the forefront. "It's been a little abandoned, and it seems like most labels have been chasing songs like 'Sail' and all the other songs that followed in its path."

=== Here Come the Runts and continued touring (2017–2018) ===
By early 2017, Awolnation had started posting cryptic messages to their various social media accounts in regards to a new album. The main theme of these posts seem to reference inspiration for new songs, recording new material, and the future of Awolnation. One of these photos was of Bruno sitting down on an amplifier with a guitar in his hands. Another was of Bruno and drummer Isaac Carpenter with guitar in hand. Some of the hashtags included with these photos were #2017, #trilogy, #newalbum and #thesagacontinues.

On January 24, 2017, Red Bull Records confirmed on their Facebook page that Awolnation was indeed back in the studio.

On February 7, 2017, bass player Marc Walloch posted a photo on Instagram of him in Bruno's personal home studio with producer Eric Stenman, confirming his involvement in the work of a future album.

In March 2017, longtime keyboardist Kenny Carkeet announced his departure from the band to spend time working on material for his own electro-alternative band with former member of the band Eve 6, Max Collins, called Fitness. Bruno also took to e-mail to offer an update to fans on the state of the new album and the future.

In October 2017, Marc Walloch updated his Instagram profile to indicate he is now the "former bassist for Awolnation". No announcement or other statements have been made as of November 2017.

On October 12, 2017, the band released a new single called "Passion" to be featured on the third album. On November 6, 2017, Bruno announced the new album's name, Here Come the Runts, alongside the release of a new song "Seven Sticks of Dynamite". The band followed the album release with the Here Come the Runts Tour, kicking off on February 11, which included concerts across North America and Europe. Before the album was released, the band released a promotional single, "Miracle Man", on December 15, 2017. Another single, "Handyman," was released on January 19, 2018. The album was released on February 2, 2018.

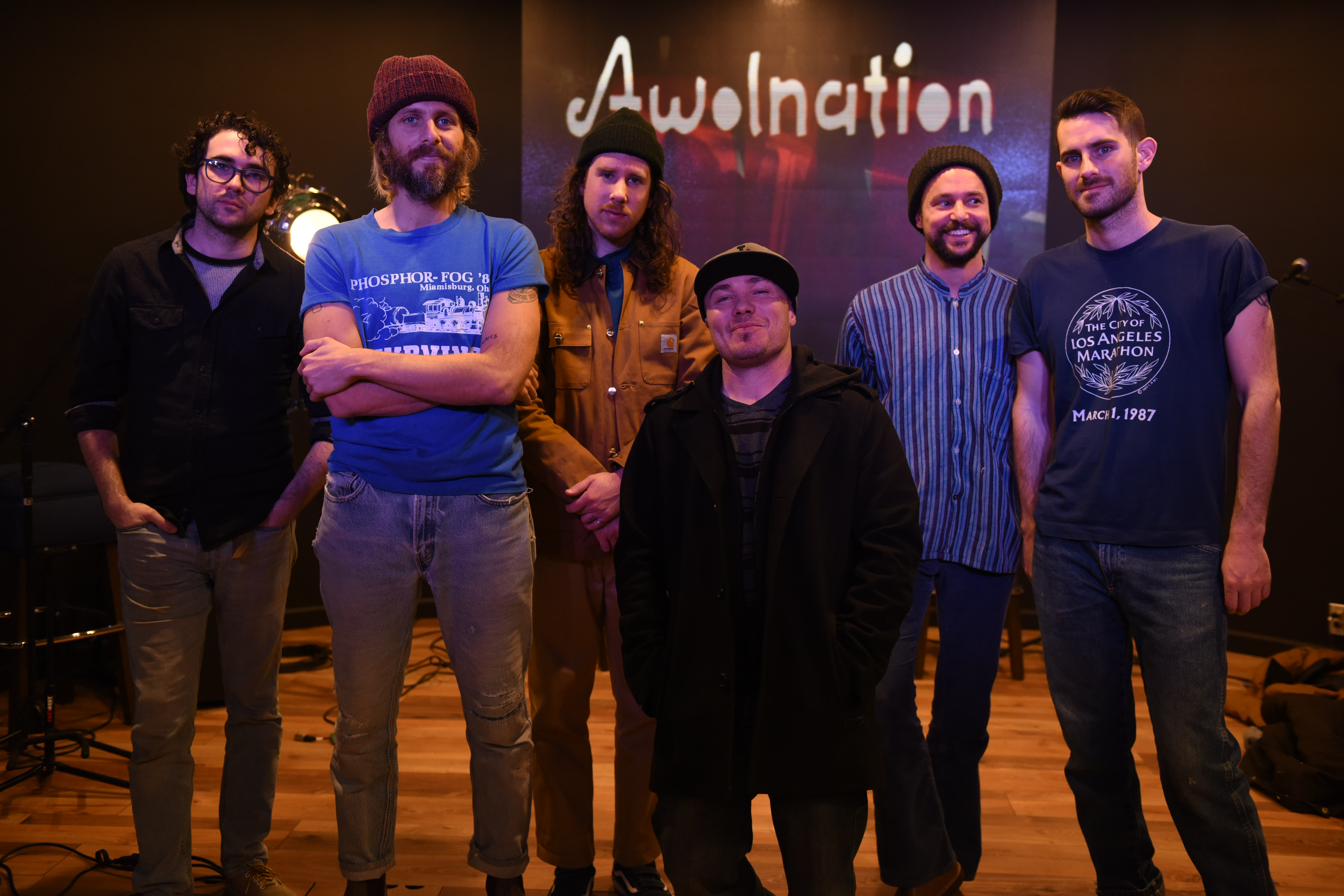
DJ LAM of Self Expression Music with Awolnation in 2018

On October 16, 2018, alongside indie artist Max Frost, Awolnation began touring with the alternative band Twenty One Pilots. They were openers for the band on their world tour titled The Bandito Tour. During the tour, all three acts would come together to play the Goo Goo Dolls' "Iris" and the Beatles' "Hey Jude".

The band also released an alternate version of their song "Table For One" featuring singer Elohim on October 18, 2018.

=== Angel Miners & The Lightning Riders (2019–2021) ===
While on tour with Twenty One Pilots, Bruno's home studio and much of his property were destroyed by fire. This event, as well as a shooting in nearby Thousand Oaks that claimed the life of 12 people, inspired Bruno to write the songs that would become the album Angel Miners & the Lightning Riders.

On November 5, 2019, now signed to Better Noise Music, the band released the single "The Best" from their upcoming fourth studio album. The single was released along with a music video. They also announced a tour for the summer of 2020. This tour would be called off on April 14, 2020 due to the COVID-19 pandemic. On November 29, 2019, the band released the second single "California Halo Blue". The song was released along with a music video and a cover of the song "Drive" by The Cars. The third single "Mayday!!! Fiesta Fever" was released on February 4, 2020. The fourth single "Slam (Angel Miners)" was released on March 13, 2020. The band released Angel Miners & The Lightning Riders on April 24, 2020.

On August 28, 2020, the song "Carry On" was released by The Score featuring Awolnation. Bruno and The Score appear in the official music video for this song which released just a few days later on October 2, 2020. They performed this song together on an episode of The Late Late Show with James Corden that premiered on October 22, 2020.

=== My Echo, My Shadow, My Covers, and Me and The Phantom Five (2022–present) ===
On January 4, 2022, the band announced that it would be releasing a covers album, and that the lead single would be released in January. On January 20, 2022, the band released a cover of "Wind of Change" by Scorpions, featuring members of Portugal. The Man and Brandon Boyd of Incubus. On February 27, 2022, the band released the second single for the album, a cover of Midnight Oil's "Beds Are Burning", featuring Tim McIlrath of Rise Against. On March 31, 2022, the band released a cover of Madonna's "Material Girl", featuring Taylor Hanson of Hanson. The album, titled My Echo, My Shadow, My Covers, and Me, was released on May 6, 2022. The digital version of the album consists of 11 tracks while the physical album has 10, with their cover of the song "Drive" by The Cars being the one song that was excluded.

On May 2, 2022, the band announced that they would be going on the "Falling Forward" tour with special guests Badflower and The Mysterines. They visited 30 different cities across the United States beginning October 6, 2022 in Salt Lake City, Utah and concluded on November 11, 2022 in Seattle, Washington.

On September 23, 2022, the band released the single "Freaking Me Out". Bruno intended for the next album to be the band's last, because "most bands (he's) known haven't done well after releasing more than five records". On November 4, 2022, the band released the single "We Are All Insane".

On September 22, 2023, the band released the single "Candy Pop". An EP with the same name was released on November 10, 2023.

On March 28, 2024, the band released the single "Panoramic View". It was also announced that the band will be joining 311 and Neon Trees on the "Unity Tour" in the summer. The tour will start in Cincinnati, Ohio on July 20 and runs until August 31 in Redmond, Washington. The album's title, The Phantom Five, was revealed on May 23, 2024.

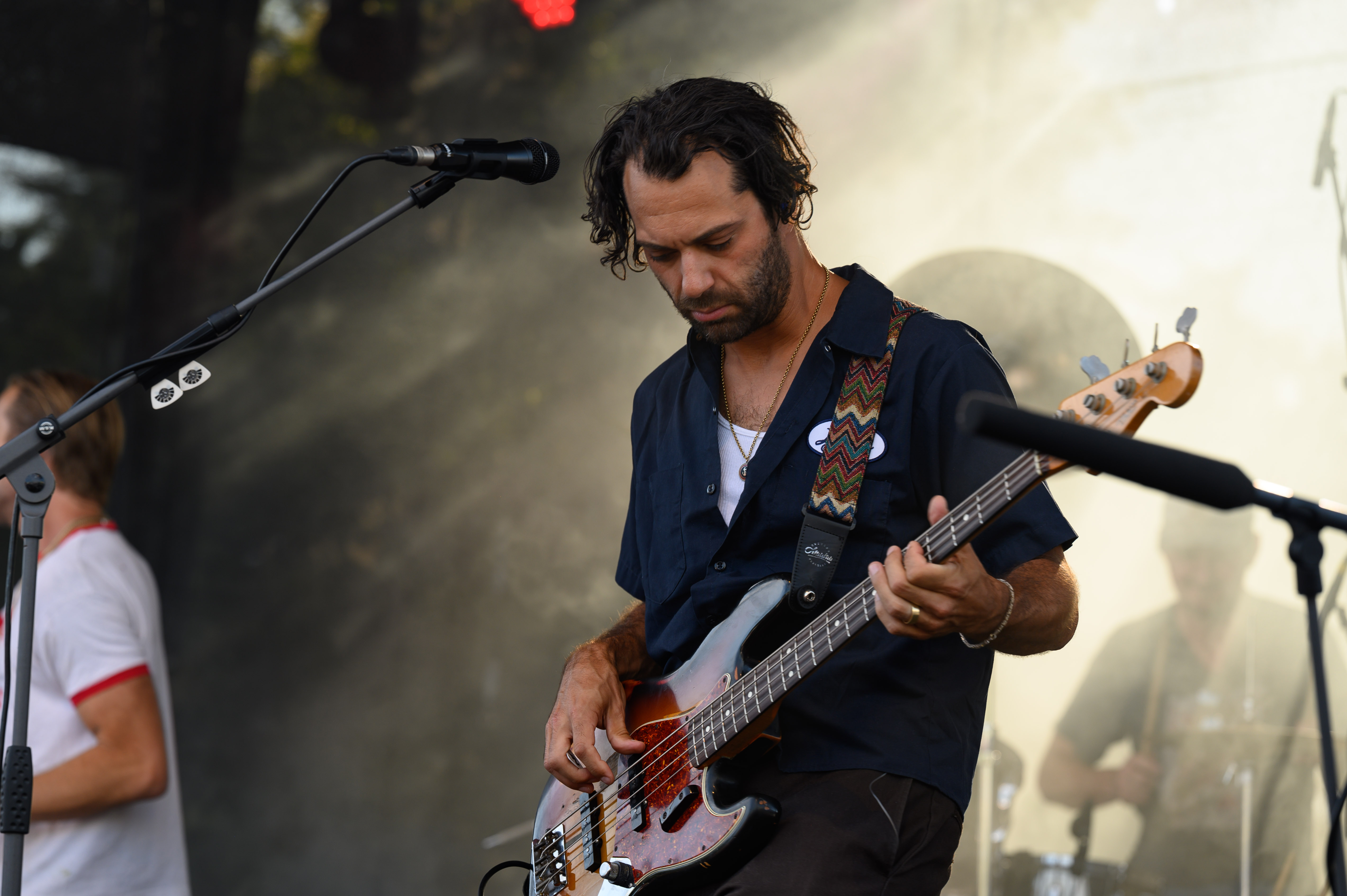
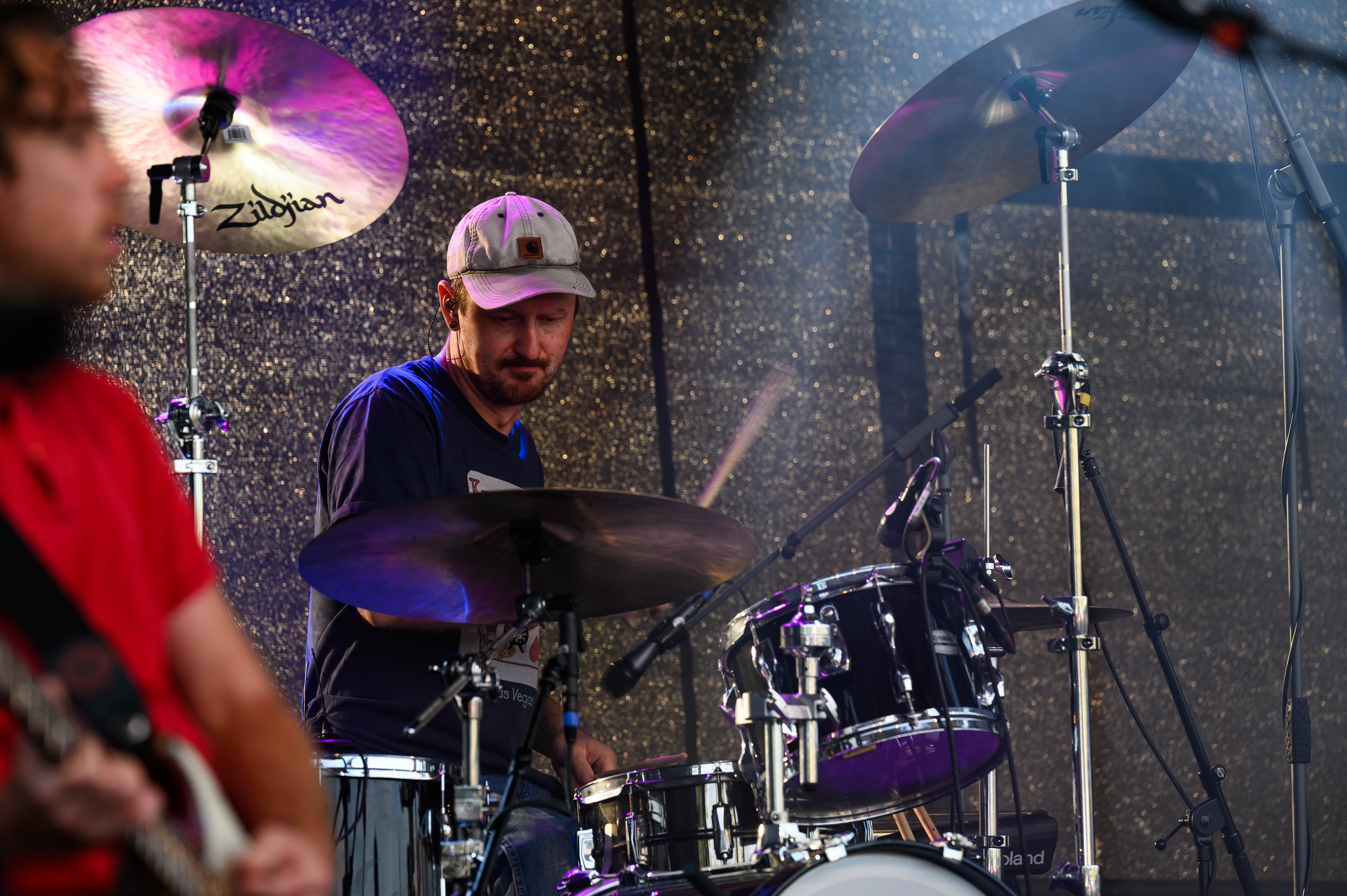
Bassist Josh Moreau and drummer Linden Reed of Awolnation in 2025

On Instagram, Bruno mentioned that The Phantom Five would sound like a more mature version of "Run", the band's 2015 studio album. On May 31, 2024, the band released the single "Jump Sit Stand March" featuring Emily Armstrong. On July 19, 2024, the band released the single "I Am Happy" featuring Del the Funky Homosapien. The Phantom Five was released on August 30, 2024, along with the single "Barbarian". On August 19, 2025, the band was featured on the song "Guiding Lights" by electronic rock band Pendulum.

== Musical style ==
Awolnation's music has been described as alternative rock, electronic rock, indie rock, electropop, pop rock, dance-rock, power pop, and hard rock. The band's first two albums, Megalithic Symphony and Run were more electronica heavy while their third album, Here Come the Runts, onwards went for a more "'organic' indie rock sound". Louder Sound described their sound as "hard-edged electro indie rock". The Phantom Five returns to a more electronic-based sound.

== Band members ==
Current members

- Aaron Bruno (AWOL) – vocals, rhythm guitar (2009–present)
- Zach Irons – lead guitar, backing vocals (2015–present)
- Daniel Saslow – programming, keyboards (2016–present)
- Josh Moreau – bass (2020–present)
- Linden Reed – drums (2025–present)

Former members

- Jimmy Messer – lead guitar, backing vocals (2009–2010)
- Billy Mohler – bass, backing vocals (2009–2010)
- David Amezcua – bass, synths, piano, organ, backing vocals (2010–2013)
- Devin Hoffman – bass (2013)
- Hayden Scott (The Shark) – drums (2009–2013)
- Drew Stewart (Drublood) – lead guitar, backing vocals (2012–2015)
- Christopher Thorn – lead guitar (2010–2012, 2016)
- Kenny Carkeet (Y.A., Awol Assassin) – keyboards, programming, backing vocals, rhythm guitar (2009–2016)
- Marc Walloch – bass, rhythm guitar, backing vocals (2014–2017)
- Michael Goldman – bass, backing vocals (2017–2020)
- Isaac Carpenter – drums, backing vocals (2014–2025)

Timeline

== Discography ==
Studio albums

- Megalithic Symphony (2011)
- Run (2015)
- Here Come the Runts (2018)
- Angel Miners & the Lightning Riders (2020)
- The Phantom Five (2024)

Cover albums

- My Echo, My Shadow, My Covers, and Me (2022)

== Awards and nominations ==
=== Billboard Music Awards ===
Year	Nominee / work	Award	Result
2012	"Sail"	Top Alternative Song	Nominated

=== iHeartRadio Music Awards ===
Year	Nominee / work	Award	Result
2016	Awolnation	Alternative Rock Artist of the Year	Nominated

=== Teen Choice Awards ===
Year	Nominee / work	Award	Result
2013	"Sail"	Choice Music: Rock Song	Nominated
2013	Awolnation	Choice Music: Rock Group	Nominated

=== World Music Awards ===
Year	Nominee / work	Award	Result
2014	"Sail"	World's Best Song	Nominated
2014	Awolnation	World's Best Live Act	Nominated
2014	Awolnation	World's Best Group	Nominated
