= Candy Pop (EP) =

EP by Awolnation
- Released: November 10, 2023
- Length: 15:35
- Label: Better Noise
- Producer: Aaron Bruno

Awolnation chronology
My Echo, My Shadow, My Covers, and Me (2022)	Candy Pop (2023)	The Phantom Five (2024)

Candy Pop is the fourth EP by American rock band Awolnation. It was released on November 10, 2023.

== Background ==
In late 2022, Awolnation released two new singles: "Freaking Me Out" and "We Are All Insane". On September 22, 2023, they released the single "Candy Pop" and announced the EP of the same name that day. It is the band's first EP in over a decade.

Musically, the EP returns to a more electronic sound reminiscent of the band's early work. Frontman Aaron Bruno describes the title track as "a story about escaping from never-ending technological advancements and constant connectivity and scrutiny… The adventure of a lifetime can come from ‘tuning out." Subsequently, the intention with “Candy Pop” was to create a song that epitomizes the seductive nature of pop music and pop culture, while pointing out the absurdity of it all at once.

== Track listing ==
No.	Title	Length
1.	"Candy Pop"	2:42
2.	"We Are All Insane"	3:31
3.	"Freaking Me Out"	3:28
4.	"Candy Pop (Flamingosis remix)"	3:09
5.	"Candy Pop (Elohim remix)"	2:45
Total length:		15:35

== Personnel ==
- Aaron Bruno (AWOL) – vocals, rhythm guitar
- Isaac Carpenter – drums, backing vocals
- Zach Irons – lead guitar, backing vocals
- Daniel Saslow – programming, keyboards
- Josh Moreau – bass
