= My Echo, My Shadow, My Covers, and Me =

Studio album by Awolnation
- Released: May 6, 2022
- Length: 44:06
- Label: Better Noise
- Producer: Aaron Bruno

Awolnation chronology
Angel Miners & the Lightning Riders (2020)	My Echo, My Shadow, My Covers, and Me (2022)	Candy Pop (2023)

My Echo, My Shadow, My Covers, and Me is a covers album by American rock band Awolnation, and is their fifth studio album overall. It was released on May 6, 2022.

== Background ==
The album was recorded virtually with several artists during the COVID-19 pandemic. Awolnation's frontman Aaron Bruno said that working on the album was "fun" and "therapeutic", and was "a nice alternative to "looking at negative news all the time and living in a constant state of panic"".

== Release and promotion ==
The band's cover of "Drive" was originally released in 2019 along with the single "California Halo Blue", which was included on their previous album. On January 20, 2022, the band released a cover of "Wind of Change" by Scorpions, featuring members of Portugal. The Man and Brandon Boyd of Incubus, and is the first song from the covers album. On February 27, 2022, the band released the second song, a cover of Midnight Oil's "Beds Are Burning", featuring Tim McIlrath of Rise Against. On March 31, 2022, the band released a cover of Madonna's "Material Girl", featuring Taylor Hanson of Hanson. The album was released on May 6, 2022.

== Track listing ==
No.	Title	Original artist	Length
1.	"Beds Are Burning" (featuring Tim McIlrath of Rise Against)	Midnight Oil	4:07
2.	"Eye in the Sky" (featuring Beck)	The Alan Parsons Project	4:03
3.	"Take a Chance on Me" (featuring Jewel)	ABBA	4:01
4.	"Maniac" (featuring Conor Mason of Nothing but Thieves)	Michael Sembello	4:01
5.	"Just a Friend" (featuring Hyro the Hero)	Biz Markie	4:07
6.	"Material Girl" (featuring Taylor Hanson of Hanson)	Madonna	4:09
7.	"Wind of Change" (featuring Brandon Boyd of Incubus and Portugal. The Man)	Scorpions	5:09
8.	"Waiting Room" (featuring Grouplove)	Fugazi	2:50
9.	"Drive"	The Cars	3:46
10.	"Flagpole Sitta" (featuring Elohim)	Harvey Danger	4:09
11.	"Alone Again (Naturally)" (featuring Midland)	Gilbert O'Sullivan	3:31
Total length:			44:06

== Personnel ==
Awolnation

- Aaron Bruno – vocals, guitar, production (all tracks); drums (tracks 3, 10, 11)
- Isaac Carpenter – drums (all tracks); guitar, bass (track 8)
- Zach Irons – guitar
- Daniel Saslow – keyboards (all tracks), programming (track 5)

Additional contributors

- Eric Stenman – mixing, engineering
- Vlado Meller – mastering
- Jeremy Lubsey – mastering assistance
- Brett Neuman – vocal engineering for Jewel (track 3)
- Harry Thomas – additional vocals (track 5)
- Ryan Strong – artwork
- Kari Rowe – photography
