= Isaac Carpenter (drummer) =

American drummer (born 1979)

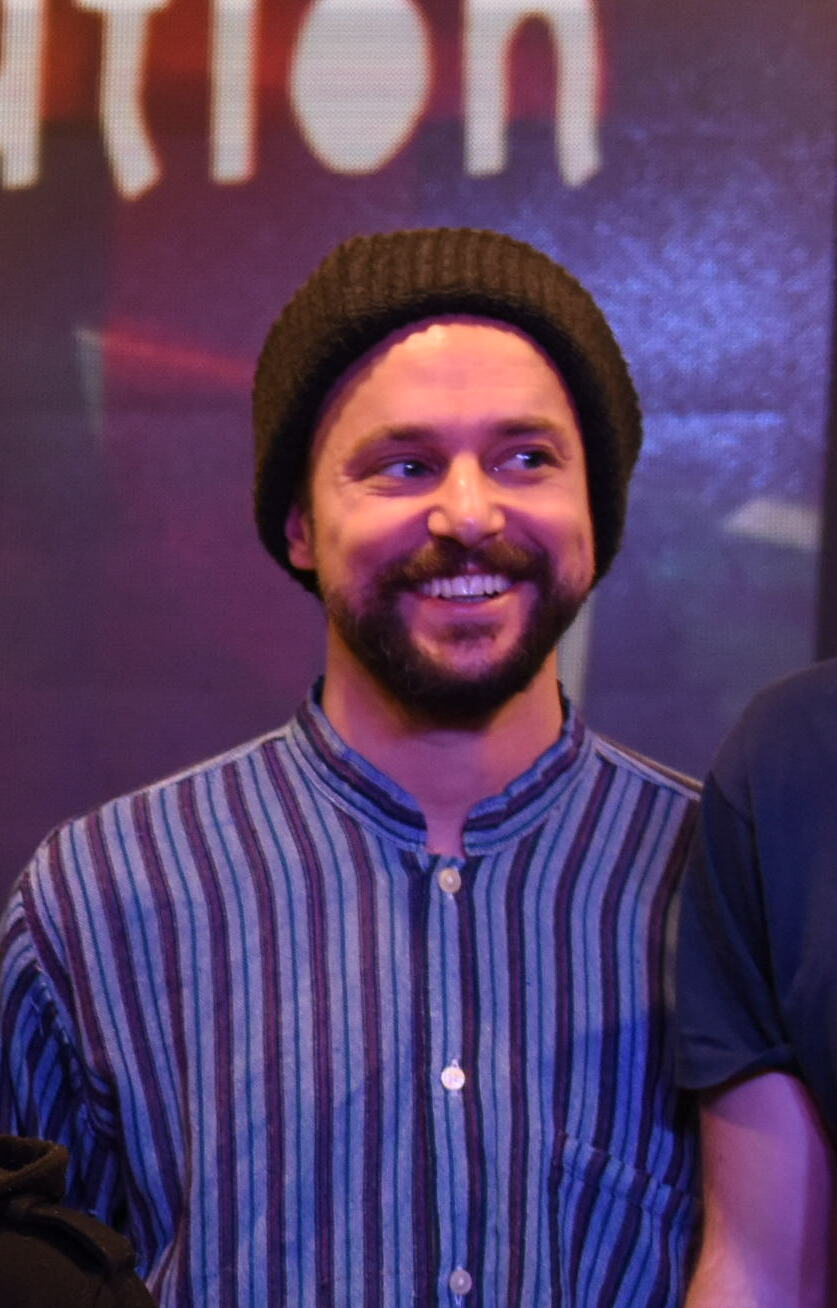
- Carpenter in 2018

Background information
- Born: Isaac Heath Carpenter; August 29, 1979 (age 47); Tri-Cities, Washington, U.S.
- Genres: Hard rock; alternative rock; post-grunge; punk rock; indie rock; electronic rock; pop rock
- Occupations: Musician; producer; audio engineer
- Instruments: Drums; percussion
- Years active: 1995–present
- Labels: American Recordings; DreamWorks; The Control Group; V2; Eleven Seven; Eagle Rock Entertainment
- Member of: Black Lab; Guns N' Roses
- Formerly of: Awolnation; Loaded; Gosling; The Exies; Seaspin
- Website: duff-loaded.com

Isaac Heath Carpenter (born August 29, 1979) is an American musician, producer, and audio engineer. He is the current drummer for Guns N' Roses since 2025, following a decade-long stint with Awolnation. He is also the former drummer for the alternative rock group Gosling as well as its previous incarnation Loudermilk. He previously played with Duff McKagan's Loaded as well as Adam Lambert's live band and he has performed and/or recorded with The Exies, Ours, Seaspin, Black Lab, Marion Raven, Tyga and Unified Theory among others.

== Biography ==
=== Loudermilk & Gosling (1995–2006) ===
In 1995, friends Davey Ingersoll (vocals, guitar), Mark Watrous (guitar), Shane Middleton (bass) and Carpenter formed the hard rock quartet Loudermilk in the Tri-Cities of Washington. Initially formed as a Guns N' Roses cover band, with the name .22s and Tulips, in high school, they released their own independent album, Man with Gun Kills Three! in 1998. American Recordings heard a demo of theirs and subsequently signed them. However, despite touring with famous bands such as Mötley Crüe and Megadeth, they were dropped from the label. DreamWorks Records signed them in early 2002. Several months later, they recorded and released their first official major label album, The Red Record.

The group later changed their name to Gosling, after changing their musical style, retaining all members with Watrous switching from guitar to keyboards. Influenced by the likes of Sunny Day Real Estate, The Smashing Pumpkins, Pink Floyd and Queen, they released the Gosling EP through The Control Group in August 2004. Earlier in the year, they supported Velvet Revolver at The Roxy Theatre in West Hollywood, California. They released their debut full-length Here Is... in 2006 through V2 and went on to tour with Rose Hill Drive.

A cover of David Bowie's "Cat People (Putting Out Fire)" was included on the soundtrack to the film Underworld: Evolution in 2006.

=== The Exies (2007–08) ===
In 2006, The Exies announced that they were to return to the studio to record a new album with Carpenter joining the group to perform drums on the album. The result was A Modern Way of Living with the Truth, produced by James Michael, released by the band's new label Eleven Seven. Carpenter toured with the group for a month before departing.

=== Loaded (2009–present) ===
In September 2009, drummer Geoff Reading announced his departure from Loaded and at the same time he informed everyone that his replacement was Carpenter:

'I am sad to report that, for now, I have to step down as drummer for Duff McKagan's Loaded.

The pressures of being in the "Duff from Guns N' Roses" spotlight, while thrilling, have left me unable to get back to the performer I was pre-cancer, and unable to properly provide for my family. This combination has plagued my mental recovery, and I need to take time-now-to focus on these things.

The fellas have hired the great Isaac Carpenter to fill in for the UK tour, with a warm-up show at the Chop-Suey in Seattle on Oct 3. I wouldn't miss this show for anything. Issac(sic) is an AMAZING drummer and I, for one, will be right there in front of the stage, with all you Capitol Hill hipsters, arms folded, judging them.

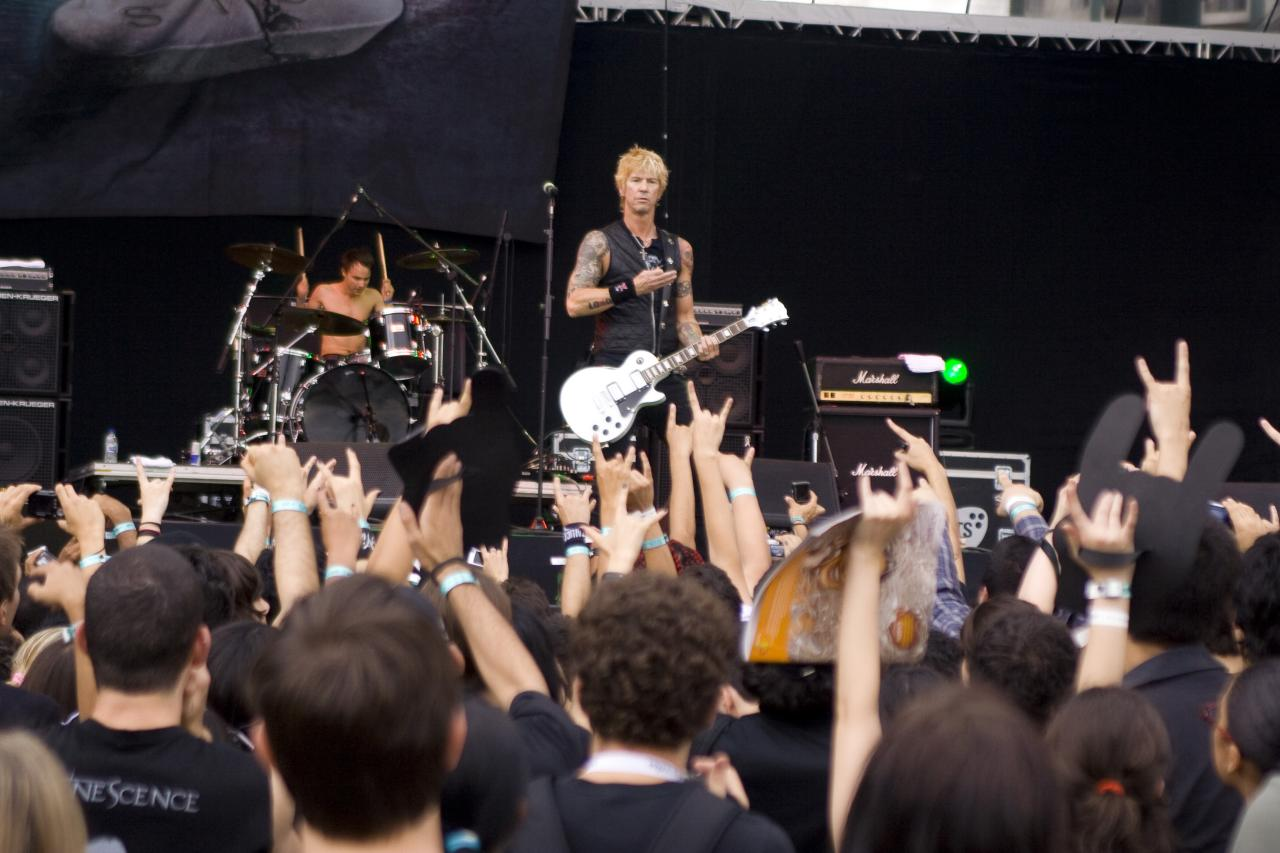
Carpenter performing with Loaded at the Maquinaria Festival in Sao Paulo, Brazil in 2009

Carpenter performed with the group on their tour supporting Black Stone Cherry, during their tour of Europe, UK and Ireland that had been announced in June.

On December 2, McKagan announced via his Twitter that he and the band were jamming on some new material. while guitarist Mike Squires stated in an online interview, on December 6, that the band were hoping to record a new album and to be touring and supporting it in 2010.

On February 1, 2010, it was announced, via Blabbermouth.net, that the group had parted ways with label Century Media and were now looking for a new label having already written and demoed new material.

On July 4, 2010, the band announced they were to begin pre-production and enter the studio in August to record the follow-up to Sick stating:

'We have been writing for the last few months and next week we start pre-production on the new Loaded record! We couldn't be happier and we think you fuckers will be, too! As it is looking, we will be recording it in August and thus begins Loaded Mach III!'

In August, it was announced that the group were to record their new album with producer Terry Date, whose production credits include albums by Soundgarden, Pantera and Deftones among others. On September 2, it was announced that the album was completed and that the group were looking for a label. McKagan also stated that it was Date that approached the group about producing their new album.

=== Adam Lambert (2010–12) ===
On September 18, 2010, Carpenter joined the touring band for Adam Lambert's Glam Nation Tour, replacing previous drummer Longineu W. Parsons III who has since returned to previous group Yellowcard. He performed dates in the US as well as Europe, Asia and Australia from September through to December 2010. As of August/September 2012, Carpenter no longer plays drums for Adam Lambert.

=== Touring with Awolnation, The Barbarians of California (2014–2024) ===
Carpenter began touring with alternative rock band Awolnation during their UK summer tour in 2014. He also recorded drums for tracks on Awolnation's sophomore album, Run.

In 2024, Carpenter became a founding member of the hardcore band, The Barbarians of California, alongside Awolnation members Aaron Bruno and Zach Irons.

=== Guns N' Roses (2025–present) ===
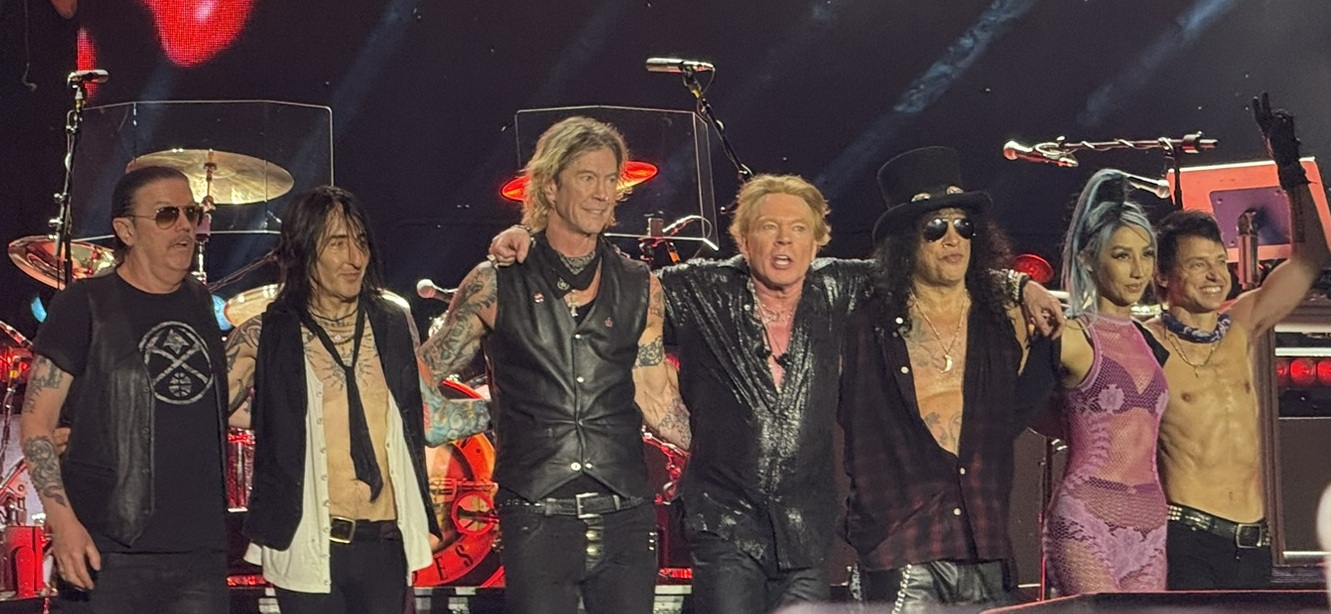
Carpenter (far right) with Guns N' Roses in 2025.

On March 20, 2025, Guns N' Roses announced Carpenter as their new drummer following the departure of Frank Ferrer, thus reuniting him with Loaded bandmate Duff McKagan. He first performed with the band on the Because What You Want & What You Get Are Two Completely Different Things Tour.

== Discography ==
Title	Release	Label	Artist/Group
Man with Gun Kills Three!	1998	She's an Anchor	Loudermilk
The Red Record	2002	DreamWorks	Loudermilk
Gosling EP	2004	The Control Group	Gosling
Here Is...	2006	V2	Gosling
Huck	2006	Capitol	Huck Johns
A Modern Way of Living with the Truth	2007	Eleven Seven	The Exies
Set Me Free	2007	Eleven Seven	Marion Raven
Passion Leaves a Trace	2007	Blacklabworld	Black Lab
Technologie	2007	Blacklabworld	Black Lab
No Introduction	2008	Decaydance/Young Money	Tyga
A Very Special Christmas 7	2009	A&M	Various Artists
Welcome to the Blacklist Club	2010	Sire/Reprise	Evan Taubenfeld
Two Strangers	2010	Blacklabworld	Black Lab
The Taking	2011	Eagle Rock Entertainment	Loaded
Justice	2011	Interscope	Rev Theory
Run	2015	Red Bull Records	Awolnation
Here Come the Runts	2018	Red Bull Records	Awolnation
Angel Miners & the Lightning Riders	2020	Better Noise	Awolnation

== Production & engineering credits ==
Release	Title	Label	Artist/Group	Credits
2002	'"Rock N' Roll" (from The Red Record)	DreamWorks	Loudermilk	Engineer, Mixing
2003	Ordinary Miracles	The Control Group	Post Stardom Depression	Mixing
2004	Gosling EP	The Control Group	Gosling	Engineer, Mixing
2005	Prime Time Looks A Lot Like Amateur Night	The Control Group	Post Stardom Depression	Producer, Mixing
2006	Here Is...	V2	Gosling	Engineer, Mixing
2006	'"Cat People (Putting Out Fire)" (from Underworld: Evolution Soundtrack)	Lakeshore	Gosling	Engineer, Mixing
2009	Diamonds in a Dead Sky		The Missionary Position	Mixing
