= Angel Miners & the Lightning Riders =

Studio album by Awolnation
- Released: April 24, 2020
- Genre: Alternative rock; pop; electronic rock
- Length: 39:18
- Label: Better Noise
- Producer: Aaron Bruno

Awolnation chronology
Here Come the Runts (2018)	Angel Miners & the Lightning Riders (2020)	My Echo, My Shadow, My Covers, and Me (2022)

Singles from Angel Miners & the Lightning Riders
- 1. "The Best" Released: November 4, 2019; 2. "California Halo Blue" Released: November 29, 2019; 3. "Mayday!!! Fiesta Fever" Released: February 4, 2020; 4. "Slam (Angel Miners)" Released: March 13, 2020

Professional ratings
Review scores
Source	Rating
AllMusic	4/5 stars
Deadpress	6/10 stars
Sputnikmusic	3.2/5
The Young Folks	7.5/10

Angel Miners & the Lightning Riders is the fourth studio album by American rock band Awolnation, and their first release since Here Come the Runts in 2018. It is also their first release under Better Noise Music. It was released on April 24, 2020.

== Background ==
While on tour with Twenty One Pilots in Fall of 2018, singer Aaron Bruno's home studio and much of his property were destroyed in the 2018 Woolsey Fire. This event, as well as a shooting in nearby Thousand Oaks that claimed the life of 12 people, inspired the lyrical content behind this album.

On November 4, 2019, Awolnation released the first single from the album, "The Best", along with a music video for it. On November 29, they released the second single, called "California Halo Blue", a tribute song to the wildfires in southern California, plus a cover of "Drive", originally by the Cars. On February 4, 2020, the album was officially announced, with a release date of April 24, 2020. The third single "Mayday!!! Fiesta Fever", featuring Alex Ebert of the band Edward Sharpe and the Magnetic Zeros, was released on the same day. The fourth single "Slam (Angel Miners)" was released on March 13, 2020.

In quarantine lockdown, the band reworked "The Best" featuring vocalist Alice Merton collaborating distantly. They released a second video for the song on March 27, 2020, showing the band playing together in a studio, with Merton singing in a different studio.

According to frontman Aaron Bruno, the album features songs "inspired by some of the most difficult events I have experienced. I'm excited for us all to enter this new world together & share these stories." After the album's release, the band will begin The Lightning Riders Tour with Andrew McMahon in the Wilderness and the Beaches.

== Track listing ==
All tracks are written by Aaron Bruno and Awolnation.

Angel Miners & the Lightning Riders track listing
No.	Title	Length
1.	"The Best"	3:43
2.	"Slam (Angel Miners)"	4:48
3.	"Mayday!!! Fiesta Fever" (featuring Alex Ebert)	3:42
4.	"Lightning Riders"	3:50
5.	"California Halo Blue"	3:53
6.	"Radical"	3:38
7.	"Battered, Black, & Blue (Hole in My Heart)"	3:15
8.	"Pacific Coast Highway in the Movies" (featuring Rivers Cuomo of Weezer)	3:55
9.	"Half Italian"	4:23
10.	"I'm a Wreck"	4:11
Total length:		39:18

Bonus Track
No.	Title	Length
11.	"Jet Pack (Capala)"	2:45
Total length:		42:03

== Personnel ==
Awolnation

- Aaron Bruno – vocals, guitars, synths, drums
- Isaac Carpenter – drums, percussion
- Zach Irons - guitars
- Dan Saslow - synths

Additional musicians

- Alex Ebert - vocals (track 3)
- Josh Moreau - bass (tracks 4, 6, 7, 9)
- Tracy Van Fleet - additional vocals (track 5)
- Callista Hoffman - additional vocals (track 5)
- Suzanne Waters - additional vocals (track 5)
- Elyse Willis - additional vocals (track 5)
- Rivers Cuomo - vocals (track 8)

== Charts ==
Chart performance for Angel Miners & the Lightning Riders
Chart (2020)	Peak position
Austrian Albums (Ö3 Austria)	42
Swiss Albums (Schweizer Hitparade)	64
