= Here Is... =

Studio album by Gosling
- Released: August 22, 2006
- Genre: Alternative rock
- Length: 50:54
- Label: V2 Records

Gosling chronology
Gosling EP (2004)	Here Is... (2006)

Professional ratings
Review scores
Source	Rating
Allmusic	link
Junkmedia	link
LAS Magazine	link
Pitchfork Media	(5.5/10) link

Here Is... is the debut album from the Los Angeles alternative rock band Gosling.

== Track listing ==
1. "Intro" - 0:44
2. "Mr. Skeleton Wings" - 4:14
3. "Worm Waltz" - 4:01
4. "Half Awake" - 4:21
5. "The Burnout" - 4:35
6. "Come into My Room" - 5:02
7. "Stealing Stars" - 3:33
8. "Waiting for the Sun" - 4:24
9. "Glass Is Empty" - 3:03
10. "Afraid of Nineveh" - 2:01
11. "One Hand Two Hand" - 3:30
12. "Here Is..." - 5:40
13. "Sinking Ship" - 5:39

== Credits ==
- Davey Ingersoll - Vocal, Guitar
- Mark Watrous - Guitar, Keyboard, Vocal
- Shane Middleton - Bass Guitar
- Isaac Carpenter - Drums, Vocal

== Trivia ==
The title is taken from a scene in Taxi Driver.
