= The Red Record =

Studio album by Loudermilk
- Released: October 8, 2002
- Genre: Hard rock
- Length: 56:41
- Label: DreamWorks Records
- Producer: Ron Aniello

Loudermilk chronology
Man With Gun Kills Three! (1998)	The Red Record (2002)	Gosling EP (2004)

Professional ratings
Review scores
Source	Rating
Allmusic	2.5/5 stars

The Red Record is the debut album from the Tri-Cities, Washington hard rock band Loudermilk.

== Track listing ==
1. "Estrogen Oxygen Aches in the Teeth Again" - 3:43
2. "California" - 4:54
3. "Kreates a Presence to Blush" - 3:29
4. "The Twisting" - 4:34
5. "Ash to Ash" - 4:30
6. "Elekt" - 3:23
7. "Mai" - 4:31
8. "97 Ways to Kill a Superhero" - 3:44
9. "Anthema" - 4:03
10. "Juin" - 3:48
11. "Rock 'N' Roll and The Teenage Desperation" - 3:23
12. "Goldie Ella" - 4:54
13. "Juillet" - 4:33
14. "Attached at the Mouth" - 2:59
