= Aaron Bruno =

American singer (born 1978)

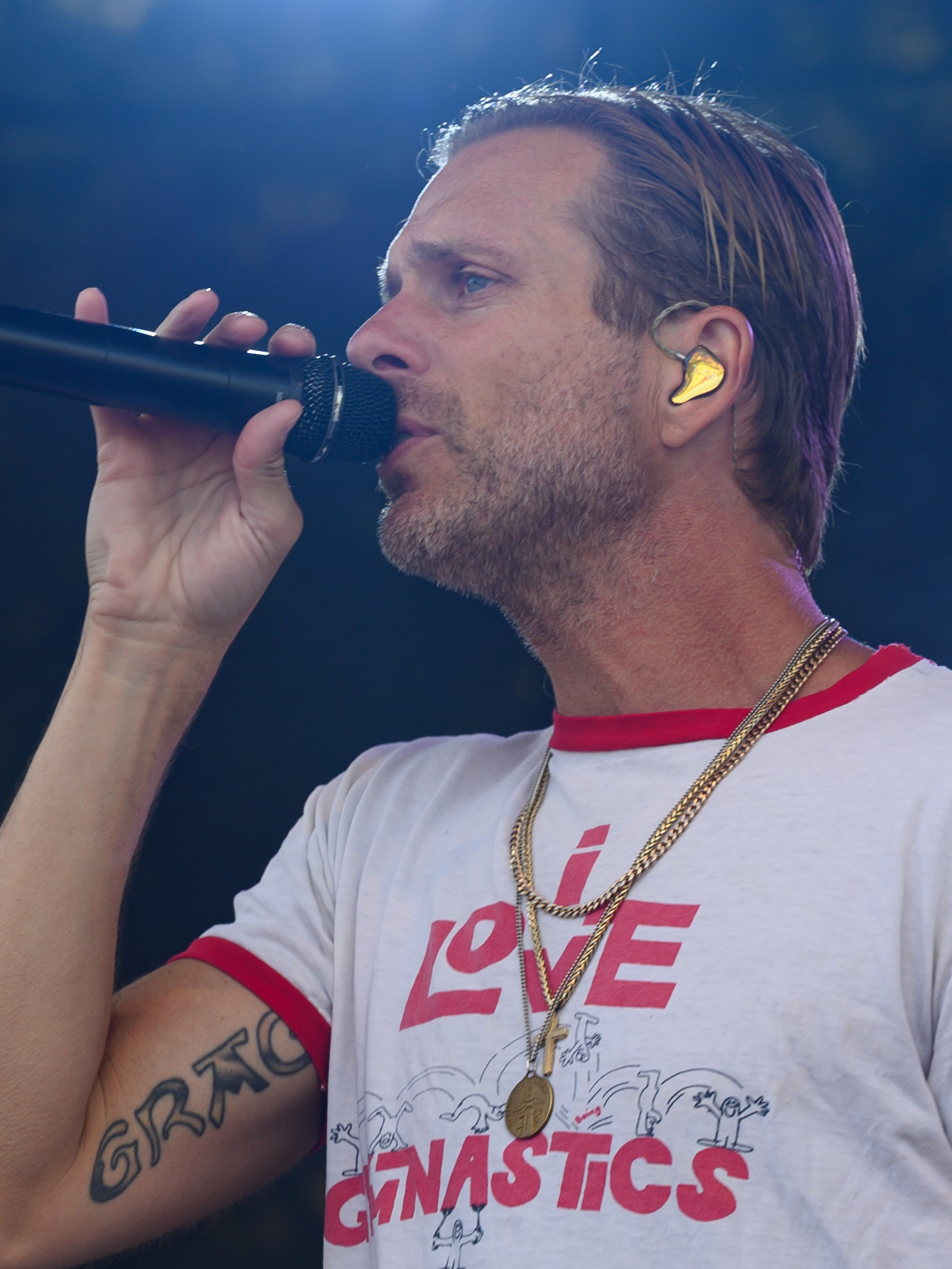
- Bruno with Awolnation in 2025

Background information
- Also known as: AWOL; Blues
- Born: Aaron Richard Bruno; November 11, 1978 (age 47); Los Angeles, California, U.S.
- Genres: Alternative rock; electronic rock; electropop; indie rock; dance-rock; pop rock; post-hardcore; alternative metal
- Occupations: Singer; songwriter
- Years active: 1996–present
- Member of: Awolnation; The Barbarians of California
- Formerly of: Under the Influence of Giants; Home Town Hero; Insurgence
- Website: awolnationmusic.com

Aaron Richard Bruno (born November 11, 1978) is an American musician who is the founder, lead singer and last remaining original member of Awolnation. He is also the vocalist of the hardcore band The Barbarians of California, along with other members of Awolnation. He is a former member of the indie rock band Under the Influence of Giants, the post-grunge band Home Town Hero, and the post-hardcore band Insurgence.

== Early life and education ==
Bruno was born and raised in Westlake Village, a city west of Los Angeles. He started playing guitar before he was 10 years old. He was diagnosed with attention deficit disorder in high school. During high school Bruno was nicknamed "AWOL" (Absent With Out Leave) for leaving parties early and used this nickname in rap battles.

Bruno failed his Spanish I class second year of high school. It was during his time retaking the class in summer school where he would meet lifelong friend Drew Stewart. Bruno and Stewart immediately hit it off after realizing they had the same birthday and liked the same type of music.

Bruno briefly attended Moorpark Community College but dropped out after taking only two classes. Bruno says he attempted to go to college to please his parents, but after realizing he was paying his own money to take the classes, started skipping to go surfing and record and rehearse with his band at the time, then ultimately dropped out.

== Career ==
=== Insurgence ===
Bruno was a member of the punk band Ice Monkeys with Drew Stewart, Jon Monroy and Dan Fowler while in high school. Stewart, Monroy and Bruno later formed Insurgence, a punk band, when Bruno was in high school.

=== Home Town Hero ===
In December 1999, Bruno and Stewart started a new band under the name Home Town Hero with drummer Ray Blanco and bassist Todd Burnes. Bruno was credited under the name "Blues" on the group's first project, a demo CD titled Blues Tex Vince Hunter. The group signed with Maverick Records in 2001. The band toured with several acts, including Stone Temple Pilots and Linkin Park, before they were dropped by their label after trashing a stage and after Bruno refused to shoot a video with a label-provided director. Home Town Hero disbanded in 2004.

=== Under the Influence of Giants ===
After Home Town Hero disbanded, Bruno formed Under the Influence of Giants and signed with Island Def Jam. The band released their self-titled debut album in 2006.

=== Awolnation ===
Bruno continued to write music. He created the song "Sail" in 2010 as part of Awolnation's first EP, Back From Earth. "Sail" would hit #5 on the U.S. Billboard Alternative Songs chart, going sextuple platinum in America and double platinum in Canada. In 2011 the album Megalithic Symphony was released.

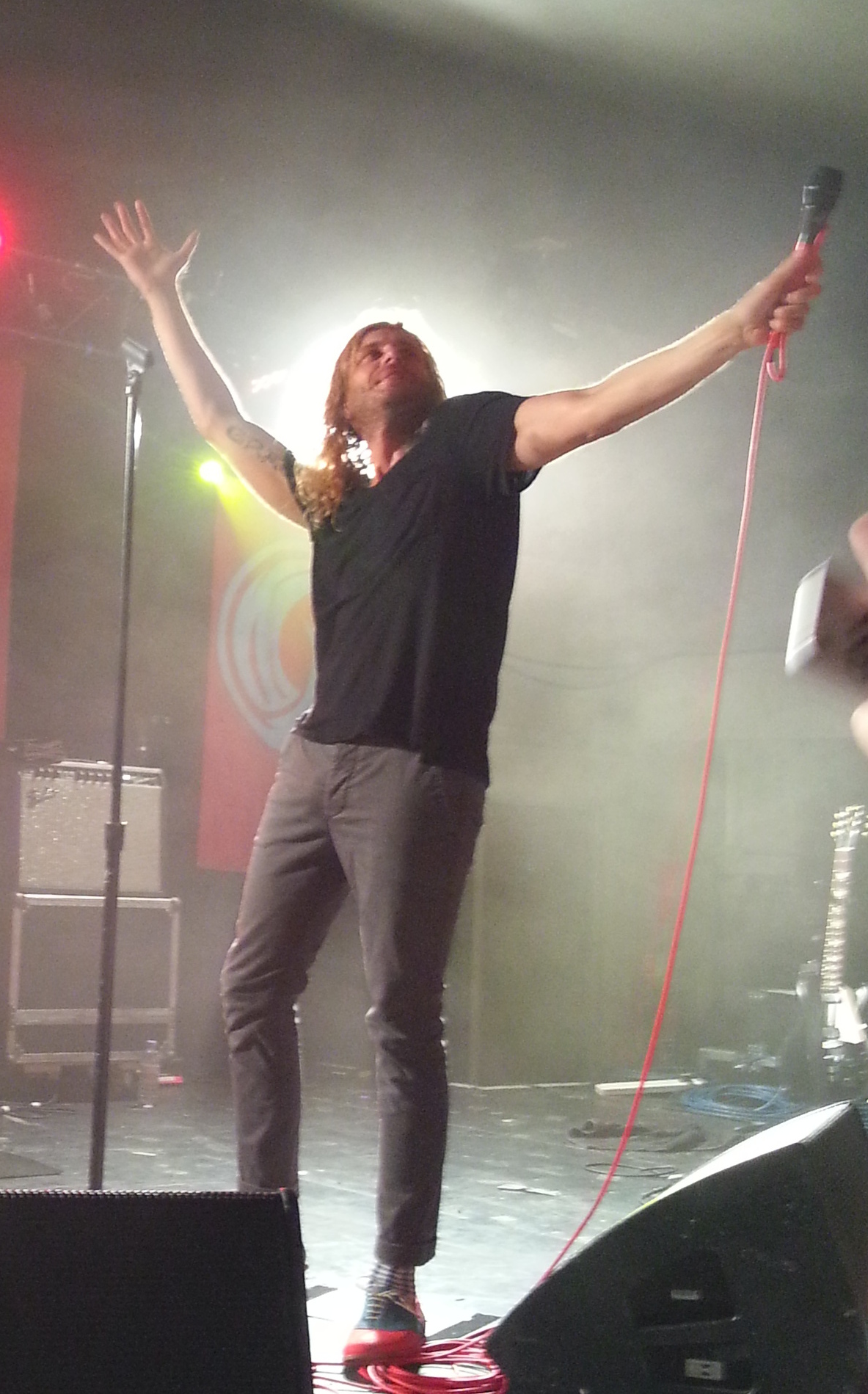
Bruno performing with Awolnation at HMV Institute in 2014

In March 2015, Awolnation released their second album, entitled Run. Bruno, with some help from his engineer, recorded the entirety of the new album by himself, doing not only the vocals but also the instrumentals and the writing for the new release. Their third album Here Come The Runts was released early 2018. Their fourth album Angel Miners & The Lightning Riders was released in 2020, followed by an album of cover songs titled My Echo, My Shadow, My Covers, & Me in 2022.

== Other ventures ==
Bruno, along with Mike Asman and fellow Insurgence band members Drew Stewart and Jon Monroy, starred in the movie 42K. The movie was written and directed by Darren Doane and Ken Daurio. Doane worked with the band to help with the release of the album Let's Rock in 1999, before filming 42K in May of the same year. The film was released in 2001 with added commentary from Michael Madsen.

According to Bruno in an interview from 2016, he sang on Deltron 3030's self-titled album that was released in 2000.

Bruno has collaborated with electronic music producer Kill The Noise on his 2015 album Occult Classic. Bruno can be heard singing on the songs "Kill It 4 the Kids" and "All in My Head".

Hoping to jump-start their career, Bruno took young indie upstarts IRONTOM out on tour in 2015 with Awolnation. During a conversation between Bruno and some of the members of IRONTOM on this tour, there were talks of the two possibly collaborating on a song. Bruno remembers being stressed wondering if there would be any time to work on a song, or if it would feel right. Sometime after that, both started working on songs. Bruno worked with IRONTOM to produce the followup to their debut record. The single "Be Bold Like Elijah" has been released through IRONTOM's various social media accounts. Bruno has mentioned in late 2016 that he was able to get IRONTOM a record deal, and he produced the new album named Partners released in 2017. Bruno can be heard in the final song on the album, entitled "Old and New Songs". IRONTOM also toured with Awolnation during the 2018 album tour, "Here Come the Runts".

In early 2024, Bruno started a new music project called The Barbarians of California, which focuses on a heavier, metal-influenced sound. They released their debut single, "Dopamine Prophecy", on February 12.

== Music and vocal style ==
Bruno's vocal styling is a combination of a screamed aggressive style with some elements of falsetto to a lower belted out vocal. Being in many different bands of different genres, Bruno says he really put his voice through the wringer trying to find a vocal style that fit him. In his earlier bands, Bruno used screamed vocals usually found in the hardcore punk genre. While this style has somewhat made its way into Bruno's current project Awolnation, he does not use the technique as often. Bruno mentions: "The first time I tried to scream, it was bad, you know, anyone can scream right? If there is a burglar in your house, you're probably going to scream. It takes a while to find a way to do it without losing your voice completely. I'm not the master of every sort of singing, but I really came into my own around AWOLNATION's first record."

Asked if he would ever return to his hardcore punk roots and create more of that sort of music, Bruno mentioned that many songs he has created with Awolnation are reminiscent of the hardcore music he grew up listening to. "I don't know. I love singing. I can't imagine me doing something where I'm just screaming. I don't believe in limitations or walls or boundaries so whatever it is to make the song sound best, maybe a 2 minute song that's just a blast of energy, but I can't imagine a full punk rock record. You never know though."

Not set on learning just one instrument, Bruno became good enough to play each instrument that he wanted to play or utilize to make a song or record with.

== Influences ==
Aside from his upbringing in the hardcore punk rock scene, some of Bruno's influence and inspiration comes from artists such as Madonna, Michael Jackson and Prince. Speaking on albums that he enjoys, Bruno mentions that Radiohead's OK Computer especially influenced him. saying "Although I would skip a few songs now, when that [OK Computer] came out it was a great example of a record that took me on this beautiful journey that meant a lot to me." Bruno also cites albums like The Flaming Lips' Yoshimi Battles the Pink Robots, alt-J's An Awesome Wave, and Mini Mansions' self-titled debut as albums he can listen to back to front, saying "I like music that appeals to everyone at this point in my life. Stuff that our parents could listen to as well as people that are hip artistically and everything in between".

Bruno has said that rap music was the hardcore music of his generation because it had not hit the mainstream yet. He mentions that it was "anti-music". He cites Public Enemy and N.W.A as two rap groups that really struck a chord with him.

Another major influence for Bruno was seeing Nirvana on MTV Unplugged in 1994. Bruno cites Nirvana's cover of "Where Did You Sleep Last Night" as his favorite Nirvana moment. His favorite Nirvana song is "Milk It" off of 1993's In Utero. Bruno recalls trying to listen to Nirvana's debut album Bleach after listening to Nevermind and finding it hard because his favorite drummer Dave Grohl was not a part of it, also citing Kurt Cobain's vocals as being a bit more "rugged".

In light of Awolnation canceling a summer tour to instead go on the road with Prophets of Rage, Bruno explained in an August 2016 interview that Rage Against the Machine was a major influence on him as a child in the early 1990s. He says that Metallica was big at that point in time, but he had already been listening to heavier underground music. He also mentions that he was getting into more hip hop, and loved that singer Zack de la Rocha was into hardcore music as well, saying "The first time I heard what I think was 'Killing in the Name' I thought it was a Beastie Boys' song. It just blew my mind". Bruno believes Rage was the only band that was able to blend screamed vocals with hip hop beats. He mentions that everything that came after that was "not as authentic", referencing the nu metal genre that would blossom in the coming years. Bruno continues to say that he believes the riff to "Bulls on Parade" is the greatest riff of all time. While on this tour, Bruno covered Bruce Springsteen's "The Ghost of Tom Joad" (famously covered by Rage Against the Machine) and Rage's own "Bullet in the Head" and "Freedom" with Prophets of Rage.

== Personal life ==
Bruno married his wife, Erin, in Southern California in October 2015. She is from a suburb of Portland.

He is an avid surfer, and a fan of baseball. He has said in interviews that if his music career had not taken off, he would probably want to be a baseball player. He has thrown out the ceremonial first pitch for the Chicago Cubs in 2015, and the Los Angeles Dodgers in 2016.

In an interview with the Los Angeles magazine, he revealed, "I'm 80 percent deaf in my left ear. People trip out on that. I was born that way, so I just roll with it. But if you listen to the records in your headphones or your car stereo, I tend to pan my favorite instruments to the right because that's what I can hear. When I walk into a theater, I always sit just off to the left so I can hear more with my good ear. It's funny, though, my wife still talks into my left ear. When I go to sleep with my right ear to the pillow, I can't hear anything. It's like having an earplug. So, if someone is talking to me and I don't care what they're saying, I can just sit with my left ear to them."

He has two rescue dogs named Billy and Sally. He has two children, twins, who were born in 2023.

== Discography ==
=== Insurgence ===
- Let's Rock (1999) – vocals

=== Home Town Hero ===
- Home Town Hero (2002) – vocals, guitar
- Bitch City (2004) – vocals, guitar

=== Under the Influence of Giants ===
- Heaven Is Full (2006) – vocals
- Under the Influence of Giants (2006) – vocals

=== Awolnation ===
- Megalithic Symphony (2011) – vocals, synth, drums, percussion, keyboards, guitar, rhodes piano, bass guitar, piano
- Run (2015) – vocals, synth, drums, percussion, keyboards, guitar, piano
- Here Come the Runts (2018) – vocals, synth, drums, percussion, keyboards, guitar, piano
- Angel Miners & The Lightning Riders (2020) – vocals, synth, drums, percussion, keyboards, guitar, piano
- My Echo, My Shadow, My Covers, and Me (2022) – primary artist, producer
- The Phantom Five (2024)

=== The Barbarians of California ===
- And Now I'm Just Gnashing My Teeth (2024)
- Megatons (2026)
