= Força =

2004 single by Nelly Furtado

Single by Nelly Furtado

from the album Folklore
- B-side: "Powerless (Say What You Want)"
- Released: 7 June 2004
- Studio: The Gymnasium (Santa Monica, California); Metalworks (Mississauga, Canada)
- Length: 3:40
- Label: DreamWorks
- Songwriters: Nelly Furtado; Gerald Eaton; Brian West
- Producers: Track & Field; Nelly Furtado

Nelly Furtado singles chronology
"Try" (2004)	"Força" (2004)	"Explode" (2004)

Music video
- "Força" on YouTube

"Força" (Portuguese for "strength") is a song by Canadian singer Nelly Furtado from her second studio album, Folklore (2003). Written by Furtado, Gerald Eaton, and Brian West, the track is sung mainly in English, with the chorus completely in Portuguese. The song was produced by Furtado and Track & Field and received a positive reception from music critics. Released in June 2004 as the album's third single, served as the official song of the 2004 European Football Championship held in Portugal.

== Background and writing ==
"Força" was written by Nelly Furtado, Gerald Eaton, and Brian West, and features lyrics primarily in English, with the chorus entirely in Portuguese. Production was handled by Furtado alongside Eaton and West. Furtado said about the song: "When I was touring in Portugal, people would frequently say goodbye to me by saying 'Força', which is Portuguese slang. It translates as 'Keep going', or 'Kick ass'. It's also associated with sports, especially football. I put a feminine twist on the idea of how you feel when you're watching your favorite team. When you tie that into nationality, it becomes pretty intense. So this is a happy song, a burst of energy. Plus, we have [banjoist] Béla Fleck playing on the song. His contribution here is amazing".

== Commercial performance ==
"Força" achieved considerable success across Europe upon its release, particularly in the Benelux region and German-speaking countries, while achieving modest success elsewhere. In the Netherlands, it peaked at number three on the Dutch Top 40 and reached number four on the Single Top 100. The song also entered the top five in Austria, the Czech Republic, and Switzerland, peaking at number five on each chart. In neighboring countries, "Força" reached number 14 on the Ultratop 50 in Flanders. It charted within the top 20 in Germany (number nine), Denmark (number 13), and Norway (number 18). Additional international chart positions included number 34 in Italy and Sweden, number 38 in Scotland, and number 39 in Hungary.

== Music video ==
The music video was shot in Toronto, Ontario and directed by Ulf Buddensiek. The clip begins with Furtado wearing a pink top and gold hoop earrings, and a necklace with her hair tied back, singing in an alley way while in front of the camera. In the back drop while Furtado is singing, a boy with the Portugal national football team shirt is playing with a football and doing tricks. It also shows Furtado sitting on a ledge in the video singing to the camera. In the middle of the video the boy accidentally kicks the ball too high and it gets stuck on the pipes in the corner of the apartment building where he's playing. As Furtado continues singing more and more people come to help the little boy and they end up building a human pyramid to lift and support him up the side of the building. Furtado finally joins the pyramid and the group lifts the boy up to his ball.

== Track listings ==
European and UK CD maxi-single

1. "Força" (radio edit) – 2:58
2. "Força" (Swiss American Federation Mix) – 3:08
3. "Powerless (Say What You Want)" (Spanish version featuring Juanes) – 3:54
4. "Força" (video) – 3:40

European 2-track CD single

1. "Força" (radio edit) – 2:58
2. "Força" (Swiss American Federation Mix) – 3:08

== Credits and personnel ==
Credits are lifted from the Folklore album booklet.

Studios

- Recorded at The Gymnasium (Santa Monica, California) and Metalworks Studios (Mississauga, Canada)
- Mastered at Bernie Grundman Mastering (Hollywood, California)

Personnel

- Nelly Furtado – writing, lead and background vocals, production
- Gerald Eaton – writing
- Brian West – writing, engineering
- Track & Field – production, programming
  - Field – stadium guitar
- Béla Fleck – banjo
- Dean Jarvis – bass
- Gurpreet Chana – tabla
- Luis Simao – accordion
- Brad Haehnel – mixing, engineering
- Joe Labatto – engineering
- Steve Chahley – engineering assistance
- Ian Bodzasi – engineering assistance
- Brian "Big Bass" Gardner – mastering

== Charts ==
=== Weekly charts ===
Chart (2004)	Peak position
Austria (Ö3 Austria Top 40)	5
Belgium (Ultratop 50 Flanders)	14
Belgium (Ultratip Bubbling Under Wallonia)	7
Canada CHR/Pop Top 30 (Radio & Records)	27
Canada Hot AC Top 30 (Radio & Records)	25
CIS Airplay (TopHit)	159
Czech Republic (IFPI)	5
Denmark (Tracklisten)	13
Germany (GfK)	9
Hungary (Rádiós Top 40)	39
Italy (FIMI)	34
Netherlands (Dutch Top 40)	3
Netherlands (Single Top 100)	4
Norway (VG-lista)	18
Romania (Romanian Top 100)	57
Russia Airplay (TopHit)	188
Scottish Singles Sales (Official Charts)	38
Sweden (Sverigetopplistan)	34
Switzerland (Schweizer Hitparade)	5
UK Singles (Official Charts)	40

=== Year-end charts ===
Chart (2004)	Position
Austria (Ö3 Austria Top 40)	48
Belgium (Ultratop 50 Flanders)	79
Germany (Media Control GfK)	67
Netherlands (Dutch Top 40)	39
Netherlands (Single Top 100)	40
Switzerland (Schweizer Hitparade)	41

== Release history ==
Region	Date	Format	Label	Ref.
Germany	7 June 2004	CD single	DreamWorks	
Germany	14 June 2004	Maxi single	DreamWorks	
United Kingdom	12 July 2004	Digital download	DreamWorks	
United Kingdom	12 July 2004	CD single	DreamWorks	
