= Kill Your Heroes =

Single by Awolnation

from the album Megalithic Symphony
- B-side: "Sail" (Feed Me Luxe Remix)
- Released: June 5, 2012
- Recorded: 2010–11 at Red Bull Recording Studio (Los Angeles, California)
- Length: 2:58
- Label: Red Bull
- Songwriters: Aaron Bruno; Brian West
- Producers: Aaron Bruno; Brian West

Awolnation singles chronology
"Not Your Fault" (2011)	"Kill Your Heroes" (2012)	"Hollow Moon (Bad Wolf)" (2013)

Music video
- "Kill Your Heroes" on YouTube

"Kill Your Heroes" is a song by American alternative rock band Awolnation. It is written by lead singer Aaron Bruno and musician Brian West for the band's debut studio album Megalithic Symphony, where it appears as the eighth track. "Kill Your Heroes" was released as the third and final single from Megalithic Symphony and reached the top 20 of the United States Billboard Alternative Songs and Rock Songs charts.

The song's music video parodies the children's TV series Mister Rogers' Neighborhood. It was also featured on Nintendo Video.

== Track listing ==
Digital download
No.	Title	Length
1.	"Kill Your Heroes"	2:58
2.	"Sail" (Feed Me Luxe Remix)	3:30
3.	"Kill Your Heroes" (Music video)	3:59

== Personnel ==
Sourced from the original album liner notes.

Awolnation

- Aaron Bruno – lead and backing vocals, synthesizers, drums

Additional musicians

- Jimmy Messer - electric guitar
- Billy Mohler - bass guitar
- Brian West - Casio keyboards and synthesizers

== Charts ==
=== Weekly charts ===
Chart (2012)	Peak position
Canada Rock (Billboard)	27
US Hot Rock & Alternative Songs (Billboard)	16
US Rock & Alternative Airplay (Billboard)	14

=== Year-end charts ===
Chart (2012)	Position
US Hot Rock Songs (Billboard)	46

Chart (2013)	Position
US Alternative Songs (Billboard)	41

== Certifications ==
Region	Certification	Certified units/sales
Canada (Music Canada)	Gold	40,000^{‡}
United States (RIAA)	Gold	500,000^{‡}
^{‡} Sales+streaming figures based on certification alone.

== Release history ==
Country	Date	Format	Label
United States	June 5, 2012	Modern rock radio	Red Bull Records
Italy	December 7, 2012	Contemporary hit radio	EMI
Belgium	February 22, 2013	Digital download	Red Bull Records
Czech Republic	February 22, 2013	Digital download	Red Bull Records
France	February 22, 2013	Digital download	Red Bull Records
Germany	February 22, 2013	Digital download	Red Bull Records
Ireland	February 22, 2013	Digital download	Red Bull Records
Israel	February 22, 2013	Digital download	Red Bull Records
Latvia	February 22, 2013	Digital download	Red Bull Records
Luxembourg	February 22, 2013	Digital download	Red Bull Records
Netherlands	February 22, 2013	Digital download	Red Bull Records
Norway	February 22, 2013	Digital download	Red Bull Records
Poland	February 22, 2013	Digital download	Red Bull Records
Slovakia	February 22, 2013	Digital download	Red Bull Records
Turkey	February 22, 2013	Digital download	Red Bull Records
United Kingdom	February 22, 2013	Digital download	Red Bull Records
Spain	February 26, 2013	Digital download	Red Bull Records
