= Burn It Down =

Burn It Down may refer to:

- Burn It Down (album), by the Dead Daisies, 2018
- Burn It Down (band), an American metalcore band
- Burn It Down Tour, a 2014–2015 concert tour by Jason Aldean

== Songs ==
- "Burn It Down" (Avenged Sevenfold song), 2005
- "Burn It Down" (Linkin Park song), 2012
- "Burn It Down" (Parker McCollum song), 2023
- "Burn It Down" (Ricki-Lee Coulter song), 2012
- "Burn It Down", by Alter Bridge from One Day Remains, 2004
- "Burn It Down", by Awolnation from Back from Earth, 2011
- "Burn It Down", by Dexys Midnight Runners from Searching for the Young Soul Rebels, 1980
- "Burn It Down", by Fitz and the Tantrums from their self-titled album, 2016
- "Burn It Down", by Five Finger Death Punch from War Is the Answer, 2009
- "Burn It Down", by Graham Coxon from Crow Sit on Blood Tree, 2001
- "Burn It Down", by the Suicide Commandos, 1977
- "Burn It Down", a 2019 single by Silverstein
