= Grammy Award for Producer of the Year, Non-Classical =

American music award category

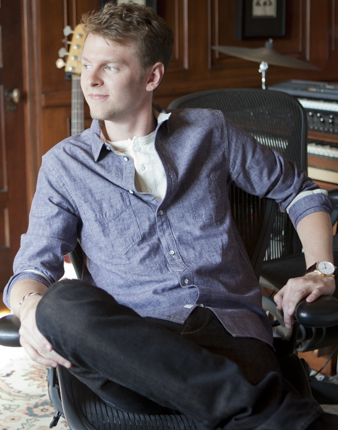
- Cirkut is the most recent recipient
- Awarded for: outstanding record producers of non-classical music
- Country: United States
- Presented by: National Academy of Recording Arts and Sciences
- First award: 1975
- Currently held by: Cirkut (2026)

Highlights
- Most wins: Babyface (4)
- Most nominations: Jimmy Jam and Terry Lewis (11)
- Website: grammy.com

The Grammy Award for Producer of the Year, Non-Classical is an honor presented to record producers for quality non-classical music at the Grammy Awards, a ceremony that was established in 1958 and originally called the Gramophone Awards. Honors in several categories are presented at the ceremony annually by the National Academy of Recording Arts and Sciences of the United States to "honor artistic achievement, technical proficiency and overall excellence in the recording industry, without regard to album sales or chart position".

The award was first presented at the Grammy Awards in 1975. According to the category description guide for the 52nd Grammy Awards, the award is presented to producers who "represent consistently outstanding creativity in the area of record production". As of 2024, the category is part of the General Field. This is the only category that was presented during the "Premiere Ceremony" and acknowledged during the main ceremony.

== Recipients ==
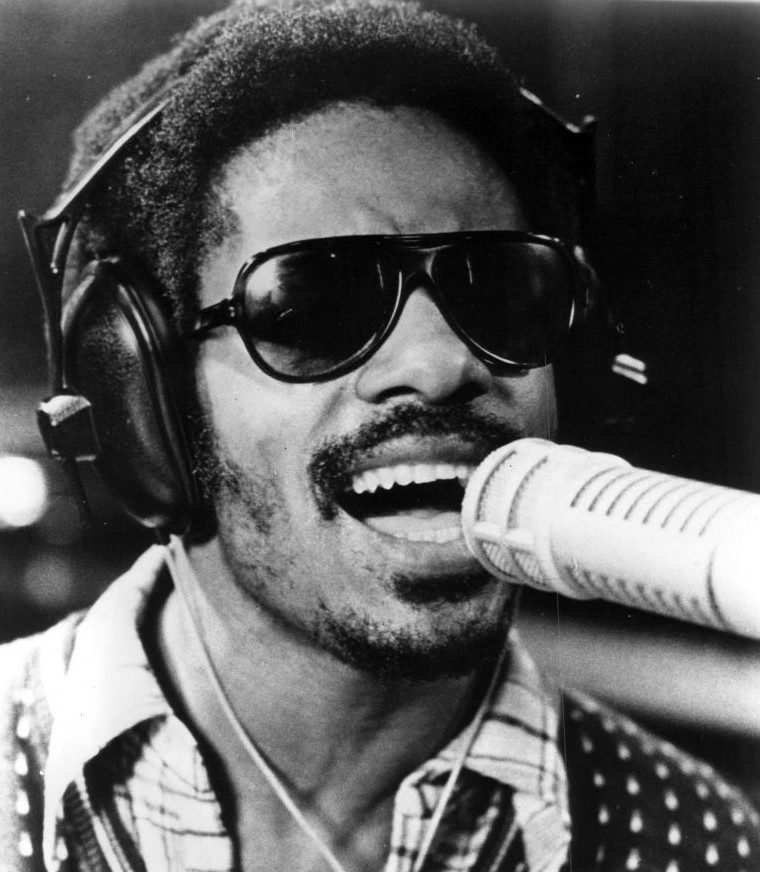
1977 winner Stevie Wonder is also a three-time Album of the Year recipient.

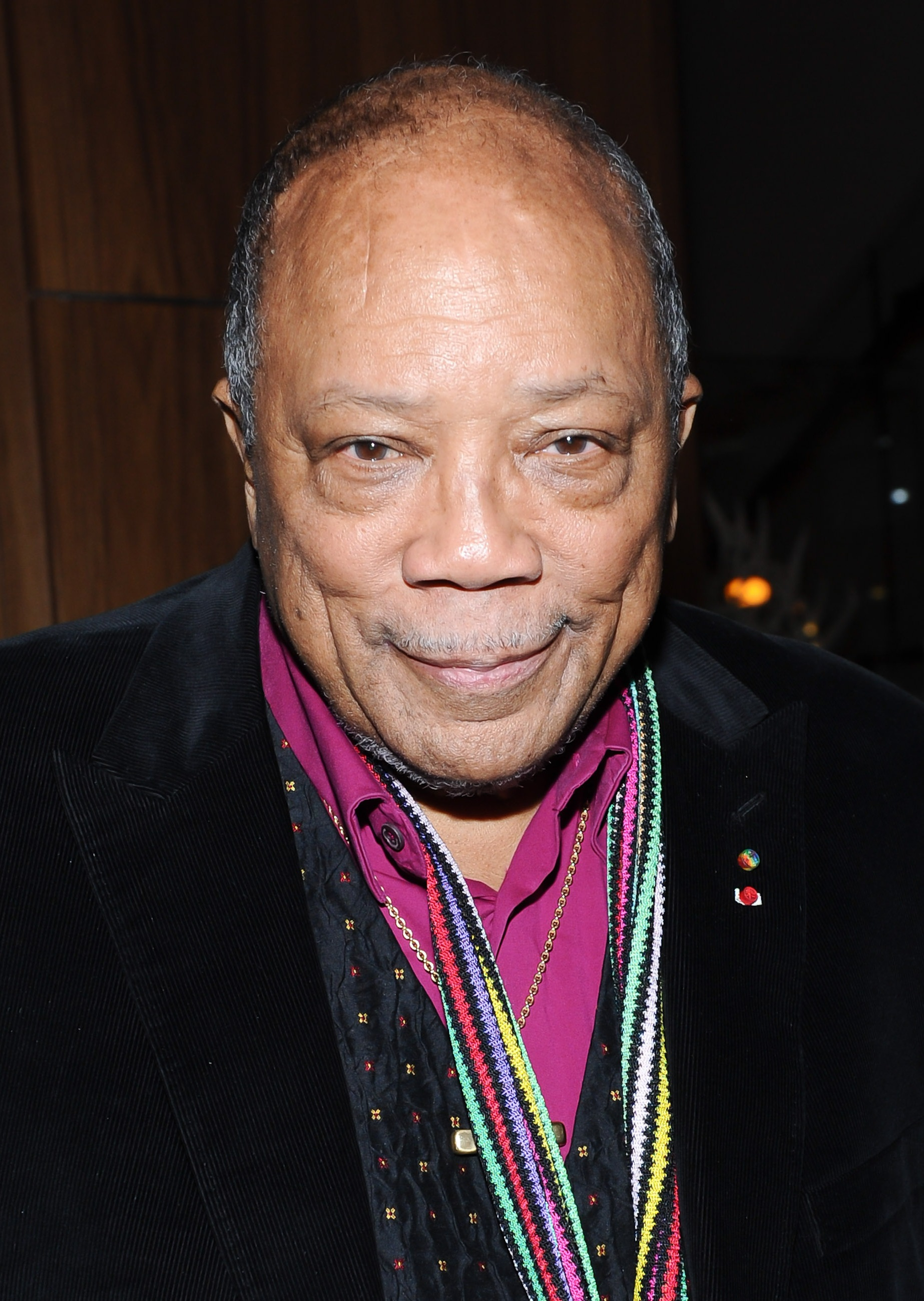
Three-time recipient Quincy Jones.

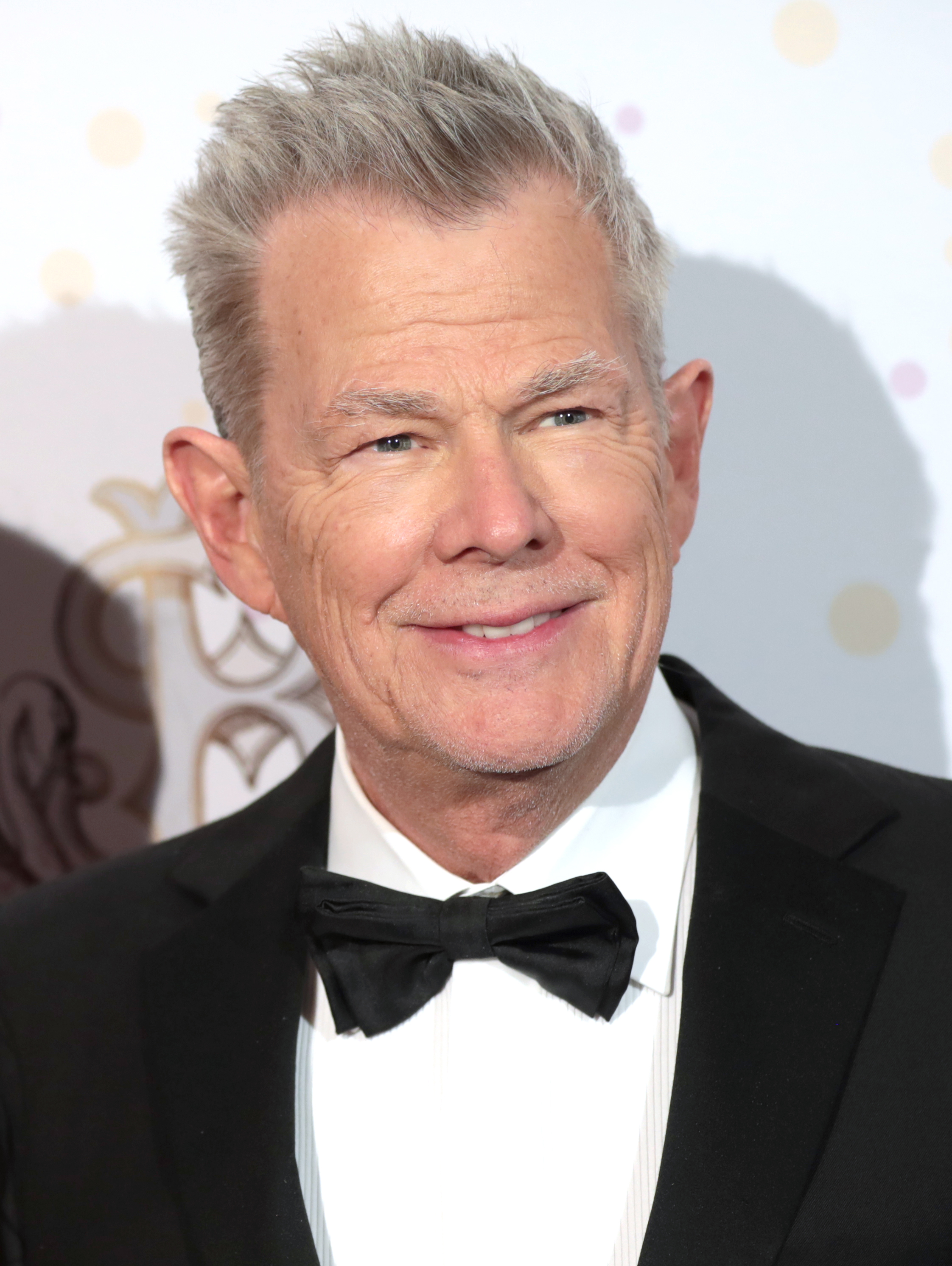
David Foster has been awarded three times.

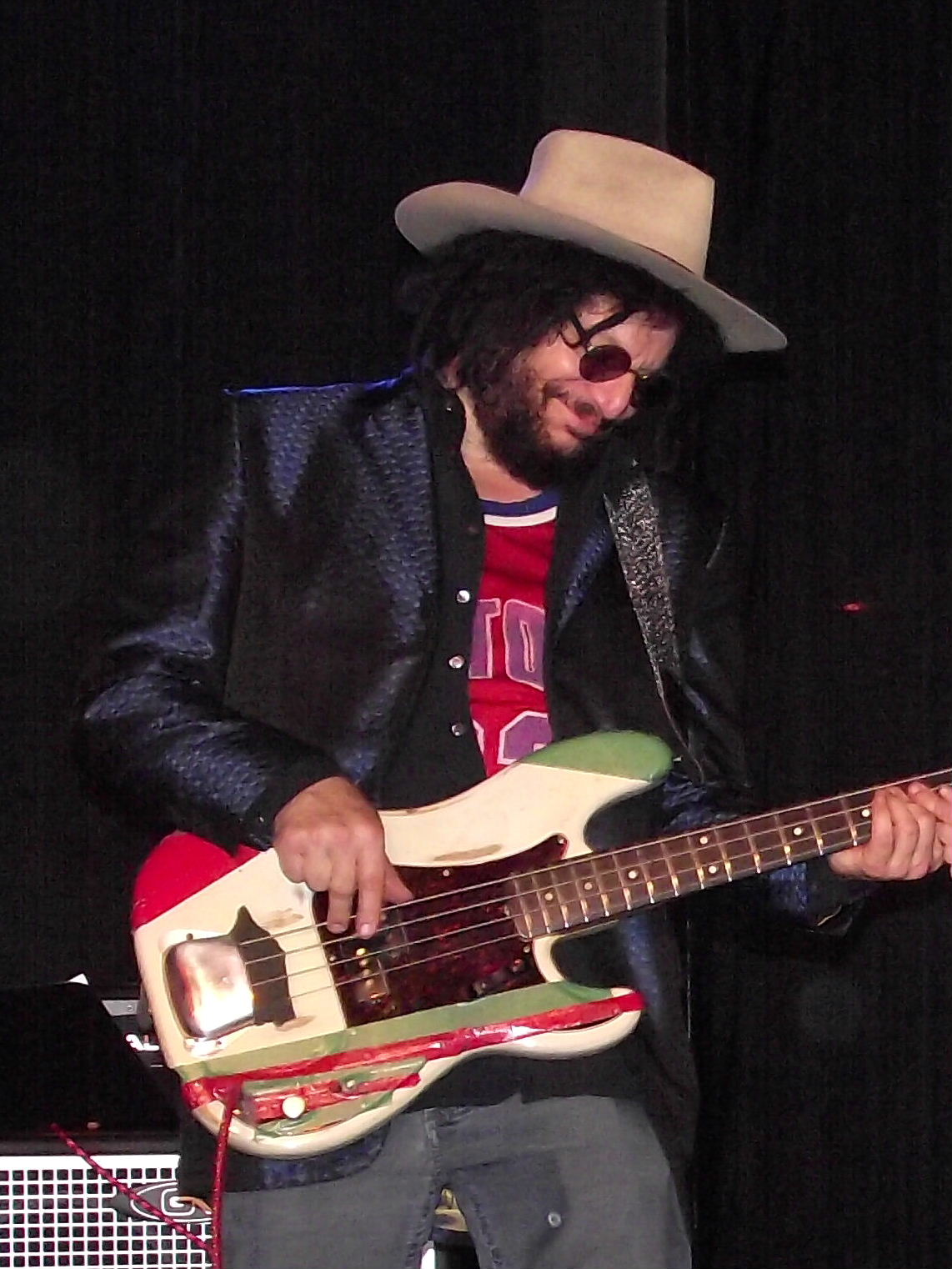
Musician Don Was received the award in 1995.

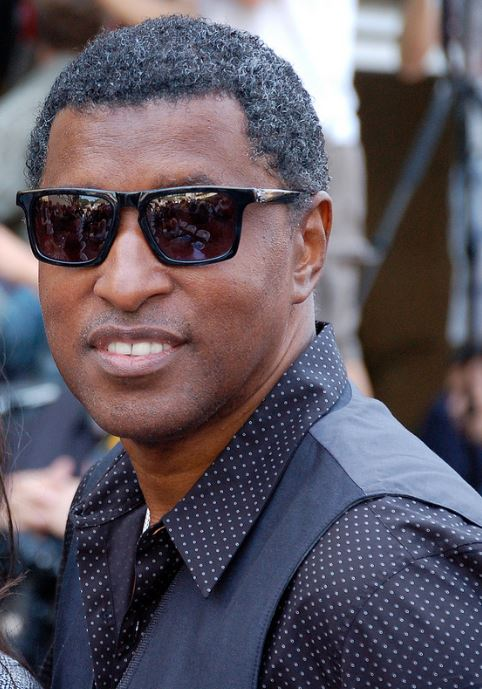
Babyface holds the record for most wins, with four.

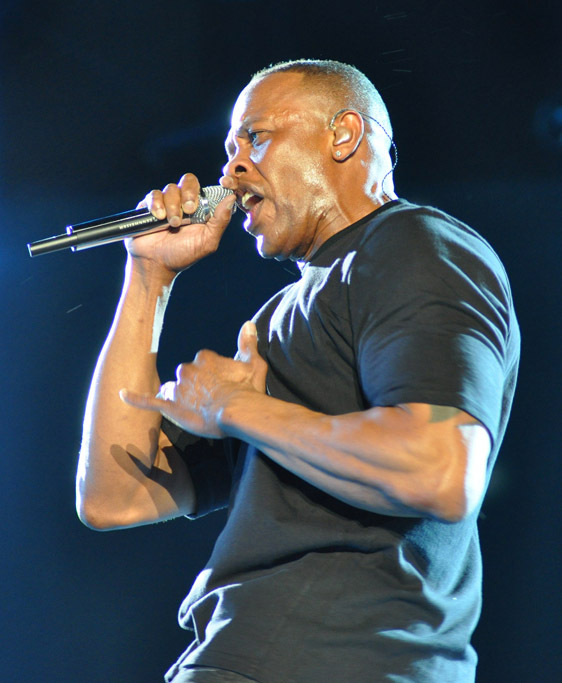
Hip hop pioneer Dr. Dre won in 2001.

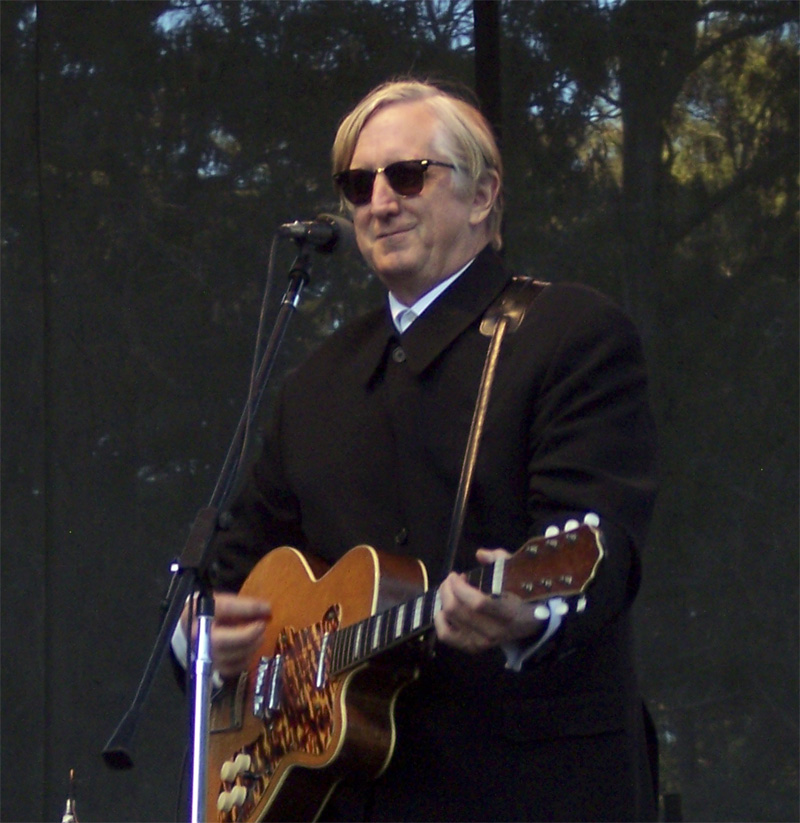
Acclaimed roots music producer T Bone Burnett received the award in 2002.

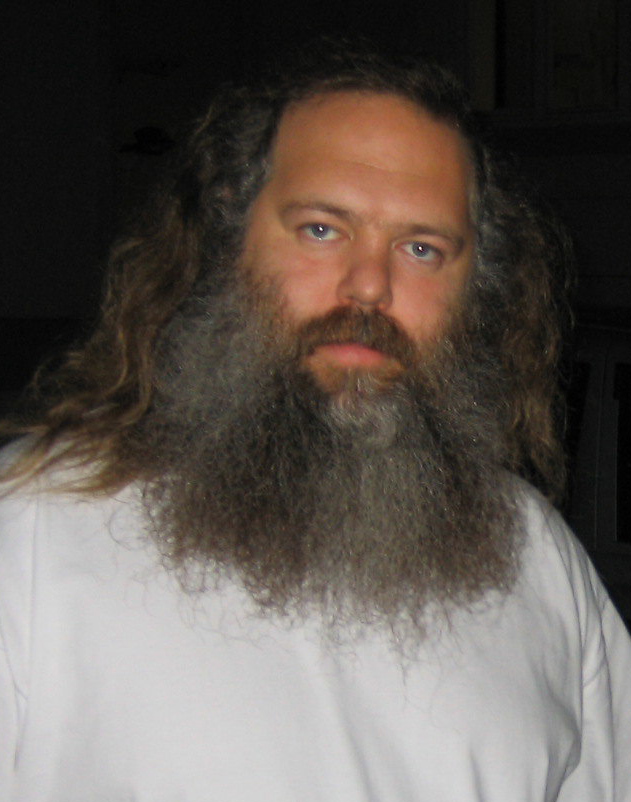
Rick Rubin won the award in both 2007 and 2009.

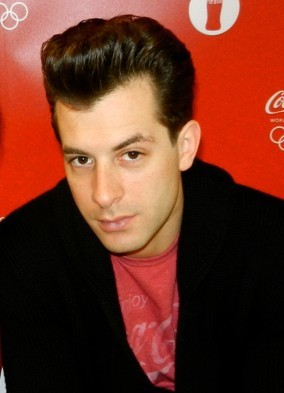
2008 recipient Mark Ronson.

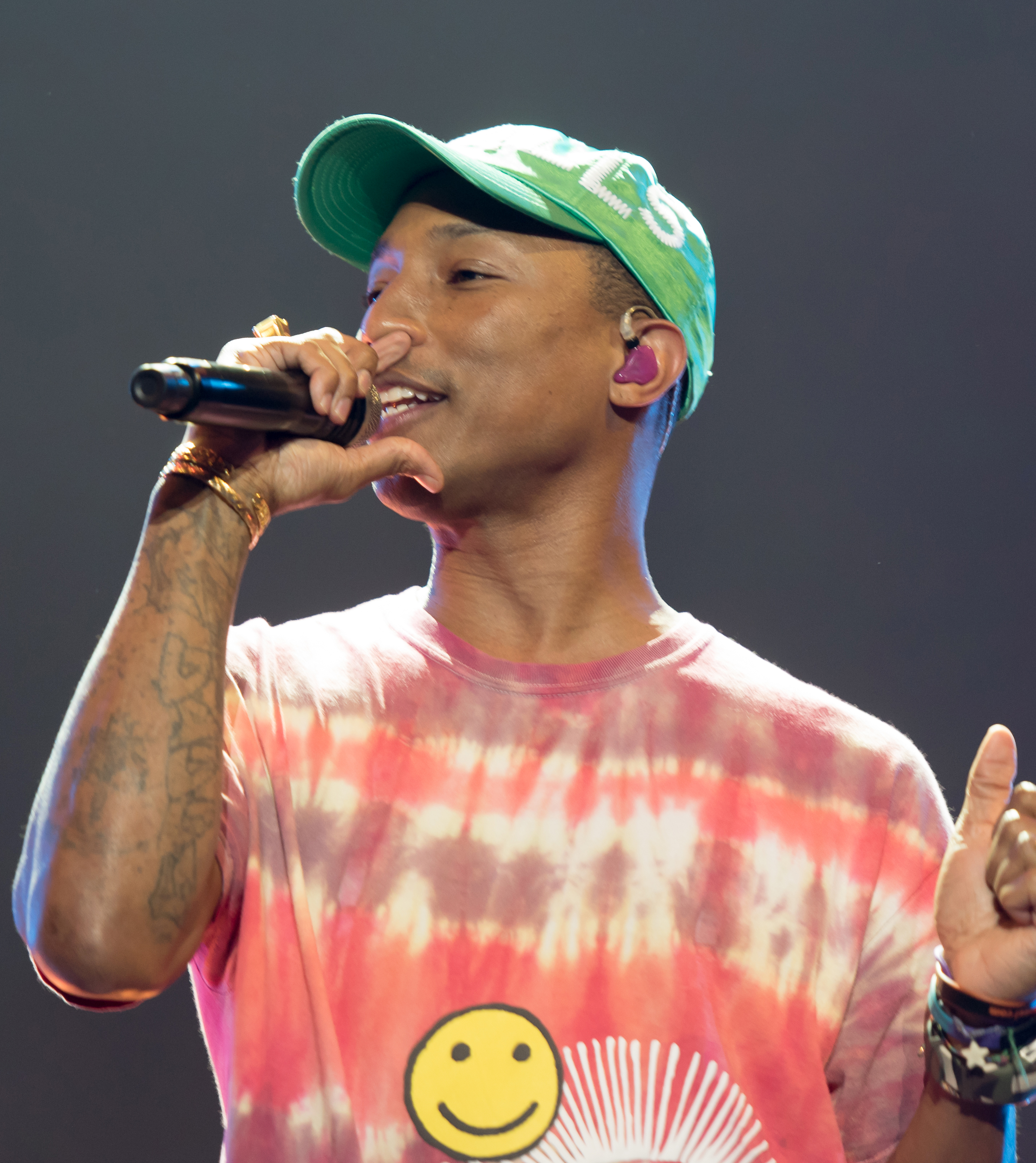
Three-time winner Pharrell Williams.

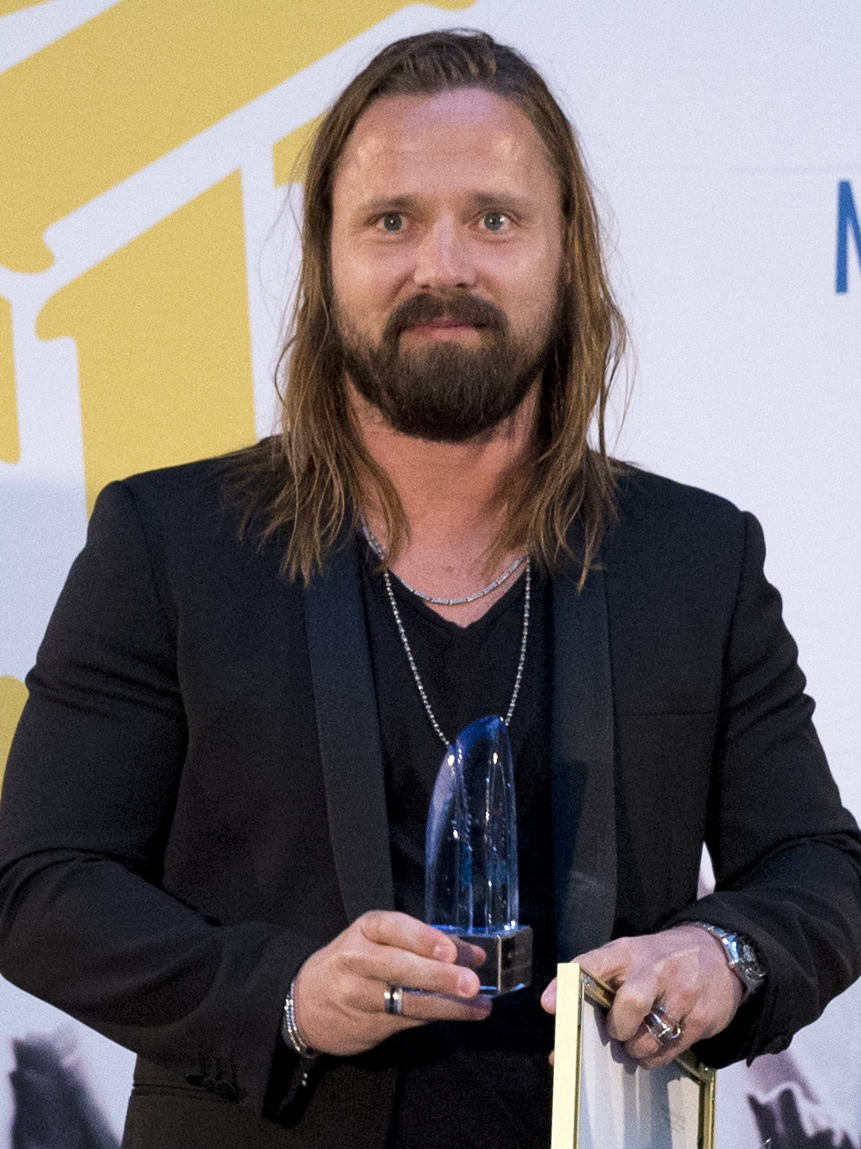
2015 winner Max Martin.

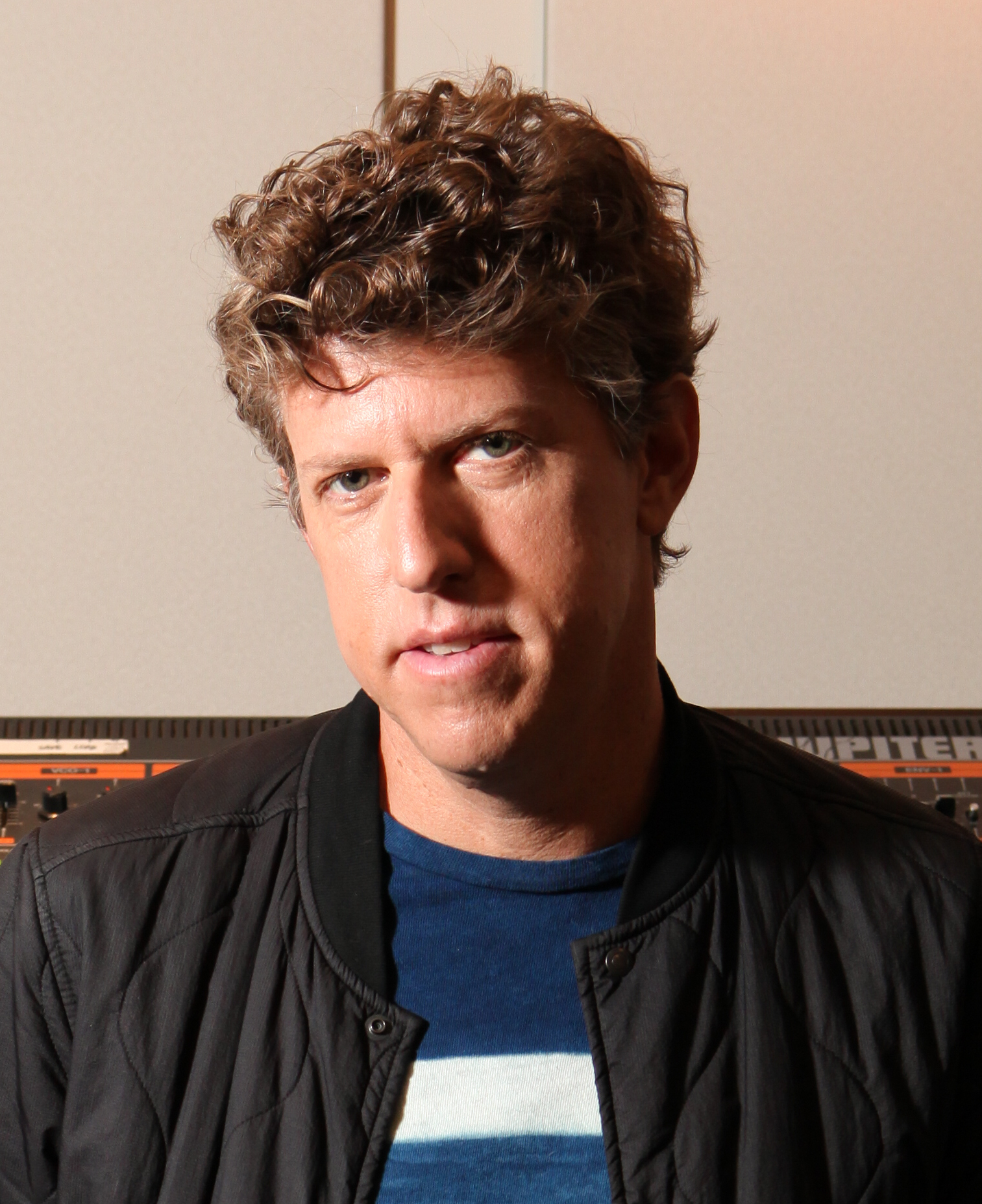
Greg Kurstin won the award consecutively in 2017 and 2018.

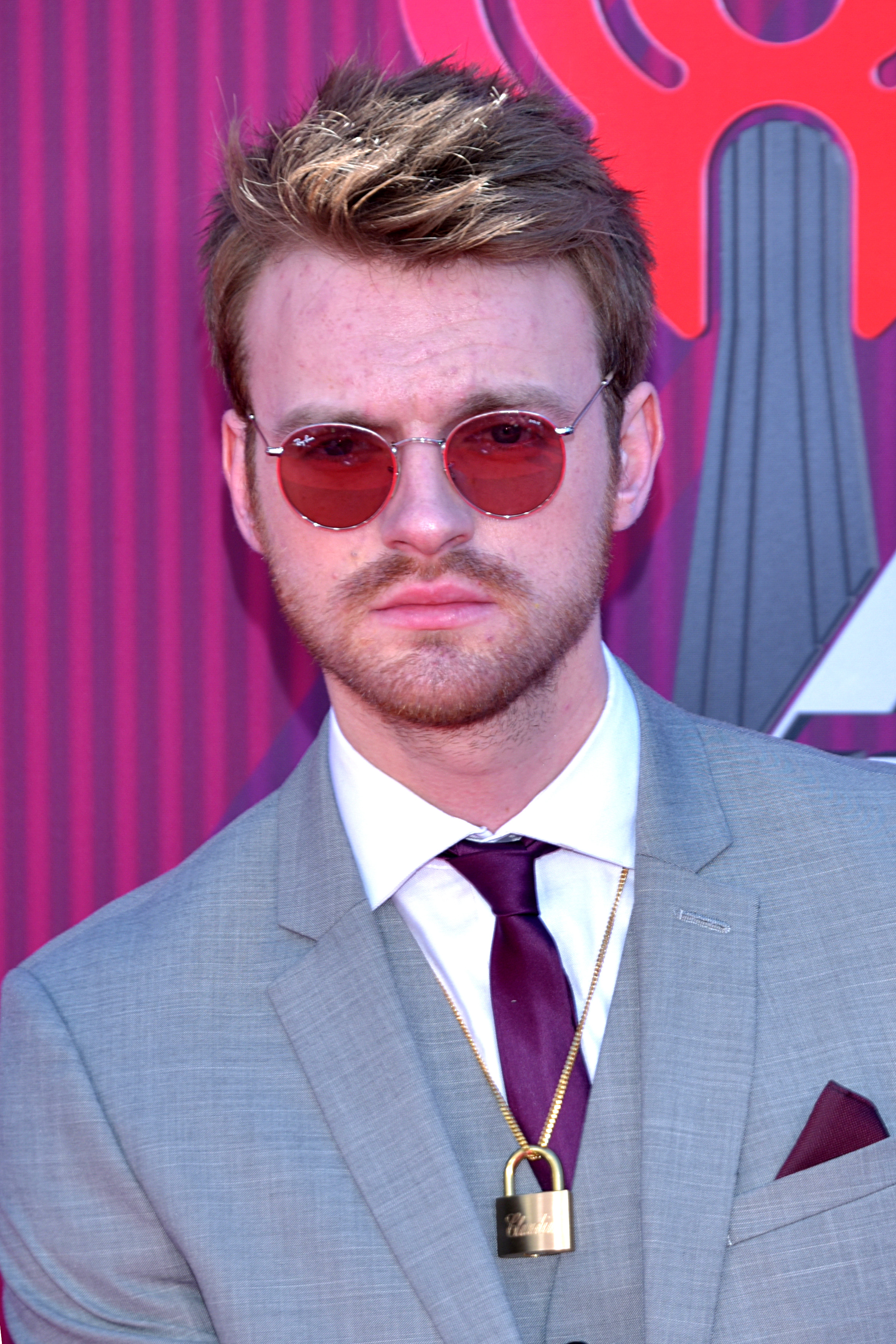
2020 recipient Finneas O'Connell also won five additional Grammys that year, including Album of the Year.

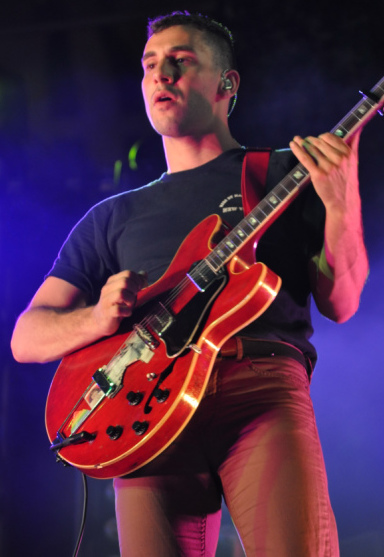
Musician and singer-songwriter Jack Antonoff received the award in 2022, 2023 and 2024.

=== 1970s ===
Year	Producer
1975
1975	Thom Bell
1975	Rick Hall
1975	Billy Sherrill
1975	Lenny Waronker
1975	Stevie Wonder
1976
1976	Arif Mardin
1976	Peter Asher
1976	Gus Dudgeon
1976	Dennis Lambert and Brian Potter
1976	Bill Szymczyk
1977
1977	Stevie Wonder
1977	Richard Perry
1977	Lenny Waronker
1977	Joe Wissert
1978
1978	Peter Asher
1978	Bee Gees, Albhy Galuten and Karl Richardson
1978	Kenneth Gamble and Leon Huff
1978	Richard Perry
1978	Bill Szymczyk
1979
1979	Bee Gees, Albhy Galuten and Karl Richardson
1979	Peter Asher
1979	Quincy Jones
1979	Alan Parsons
1979	Phil Ramone

=== 1980s ===
Year	Producer
1980
1980	Larry Butler
1980	Mike Chapman
1980	Quincy Jones
1980	Ted Templeman
1980	Maurice White
1981
1981	Phil Ramone
1981	Quincy Jones
1981	Michael Omartian
1981	Queen and Mack
1981	Stevie Wonder
1982
1982	Quincy Jones
1982	Val Garay
1982	Mutt Lange and Mick Jones
1982	Arif Mardin
1982	Lionel Richie
1983
1983	Toto
1983	David Foster
1983	Quincy Jones
1983	Gary Katz
1983	John Cougar Mellencamp and Don Gehman
1984
1984	Michael Jackson and Quincy Jones
1984	James Anthony Carmichael and Lionel Richie
1984	Jay Graydon
1984	Quincy Jones
1984	Phil Ramone
1985
1985	James Anthony Carmichael and Lionel Richie (TIE)
1985	David Foster (TIE)
1985	Mutt Lange and The Cars
1985	Michael Omartian
1985	Prince & the Revolution
1986
1986	Phil Collins and Hugh Padgham
1986	David Foster
1986	Don Henley, Danny Kortchmar and Greg Ladanyi
1986	Mark Knopfler and Neil Dorfsman
1986	Narada Michael Walden
1987
1987	Jimmy Jam and Terry Lewis
1987	David Foster
1987	Michael Omartian
1987	Paul Simon
1987	Steve Winwood and Russ Titelman
1988
1988	Narada Michael Walden
1988	Emilio Estefan and The Jerks
1988	Quincy Jones and Michael Jackson
1988	Daniel Lanois and Brian Eno
1988	John Mellencamp and Don Gehman
1989
1989	Neil Dorfsman
1989	Thomas Dolby
1989	David Kershenbaum
1989	L.A. Reid and Babyface
1989	Narada Michael Walden

=== 1990s ===
Year	Producer
1990
1990	Peter Asher
1990	Emilio Estefan, Jorge Casas and Clay Ostwald
1990	Jimmy Jam and Terry Lewis and Janet Jackson
1990	L.A. Reid and Babyface
1990	Prince
1990	Tears for Fears and David Bascombe
1991
1991	Quincy Jones
1991	Glen Ballard
1991	Phil Collins and Hugh Padgham
1991	Mick Jones and Billy Joel
1991	Arif Mardin
1992
1992	David Foster
1992	Walter Afanasieff and Mariah Carey
1992	Andre Fischer
1992	Paul Simon
1992	Keith Thomas
1993
1993	Brian Eno and Daniel Lanois (TIE)
1993	L.A. Reid and Babyface (TIE)
1993	Mitchell Froom
1993	Teddy Riley
1993	Bruce Swedien
1993	Chris Thomas
1994
1994	David Foster
1994	Walter Afanasieff
1994	Tony Brown
1994	Bruce Fairbairn
1994	Jimmy Jam and Terry Lewis
1994	Hugh Padgham
1995
1995	Don Was
1995	David Foster
1995	Trevor Horn
1995	Jimmy Jam and Terry Lewis
1995	Brendan O'Brien
1996
1996	Babyface
1996	Glen Ballard
1996	Rick Chertoff
1996	Jimmy Jam and Terry Lewis
1996	Rick Rubin
1997
1997	Babyface
1997	David Foster
1997	Don Gehman
1997	Brendan O'Brien
1997	Don Was
1998
1998	Babyface
1998	Walter Afanasieff
1998	Paula Cole
1998	Kirk Franklin
1998	Keith Thomas
1999
1999	Rob Cavallo
1999	Michael Beinhorn
1999	Tchad Blake
1999	Sheryl Crow
1999	Lauryn Hill

=== 2000s ===
Year	Producer
2000
2000	Walter Afanasieff
2000	Rob Cavallo
2000	Dann Huff
2000	Rick Rubin
2000	Matt Serletic
2001
2001	Dr. Dre
2001	Bill Bottrell
2001	Nigel Godrich
2001	Jimmy Jam and Terry Lewis
2001	Matt Serletic
2002
2002	T-Bone Burnett
2002	Dr. Dre
2002	Gerald Eaton and Brian West
2002	Nigel Godrich
2002	Jimmy Jam and Terry Lewis
2003
2003	Arif Mardin
2003	Dr. Dre
2003	Nellee Hooper
2003	Jimmy Jam and Terry Lewis
2003	Rick Rubin
2004
2004	The Neptunes
2004	Nigel Godrich
2004	Jimmy Jam and Terry Lewis
2004	The Matrix
2004	Outkast
2005
2005	John Shanks
2005	T-Bone Burnett
2005	Rob Cavallo
2005	Jimmy Jam and Terry Lewis
2005	Tommy LiPuma
2006
2006	Steve Lillywhite
2006	Danger Mouse
2006	Nigel Godrich
2006	Jimmy Jam and Terry Lewis
2006	The Neptunes
2007
2007	Rick Rubin
2007	Howard Benson
2007	T-Bone Burnett
2007	Danger Mouse
2007	will.i.am
2008
2008	Mark Ronson
2008	Howard Benson
2008	Joe Chiccarelli
2008	Mike Elizondo
2008	Timbaland
2009
2009	Rick Rubin
2009	Danger Mouse
2009	Nigel Godrich
2009	Johnny K
2009	will.i.am

=== 2010s ===
Year	Producer
2010
2010	Brendan O'Brien
2010	T-Bone Burnett
2010	Ethan Johns
2010	Larry Klein
2010	Greg Kurstin
2011
2011	Danger Mouse
2011	Rob Cavallo
2011	Dr. Luke
2011	RedOne
2011	The Smeezingtons
2012
2012	Paul Epworth
2012	Danger Mouse
2012	The Smeezingtons
2012	Ryan Tedder
2012	Butch Vig
2013
2013	Dan Auerbach
2013	Jeff Bhasker
2013	Diplo
2013	Markus Dravs
2013	Salaam Remi
2014
2014	Pharrell Williams
2014	Rob Cavallo
2014	Dr. Luke
2014	Ariel Rechtshaid
2014	Jeff Tweedy
2015
2015	Max Martin
2015	Paul Epworth
2015	John Hill
2015	Jay Joyce
2015	Greg Kurstin
2016
2016	Jeff Bhasker
2016	Dave Cobb
2016	Diplo
2016	Larry Klein
2016	Blake Mills
2017
2017	Greg Kurstin
2017	Benny Blanco
2017	Max Martin
2017	Nineteen85
2017	Ricky Reed
2018
2018	Greg Kurstin
2018	Calvin Harris
2018	No I.D.
2018	Blake Mills
2018	The Stereotypes
2019
2019	Pharrell Williams
2019	Boi-1da
2019	Larry Klein
2019	Linda Perry
2019	Kanye West

=== 2020s ===
Year	Producer
2020
2020	Finneas O'Connell
2020	Jack Antonoff
2020	Dan Auerbach
2020	John Hill
2020	Ricky Reed
2021
2021	Andrew Watt
2021	Jack Antonoff
2021	Dan Auerbach
2021	Dave Cobb
2021	Flying Lotus
2022
2022	Jack Antonoff
2022	Rogét Chahayed
2022	Mike Elizondo
2022	Hit-Boy
2022	Ricky Reed
2023
2023	Jack Antonoff
2023	Dan Auerbach
2023	Boi-1da
2023	Dahi
2023	Dernst "D'Mile" Emile II
2024
2024	Jack Antonoff
2024	Dernst "D'Mile" Emile II
2024	Hit-Boy
2024	Metro Boomin
2024	Dan Nigro
2025
2025	Dan Nigro
2025	Alissia
2025	Dernst "D'Mile" Emile II
2025	Ian Fitchuk
2025	Mustard
2026
2026	Cirkut
2026	Dan Auerbach
2026	Dijon
2026	Blake Mills
2026	Sounwave
2027
2027	Tony Berg
2027	Dernst "D'Mile" Emile II
2027	Noah Goldstein
2027	Miranda Lambert
2027	Mike Sabath

^{^[I]} Each year is linked to the article about the Grammy Awards held that year.an

== Producers with multiple wins ==
4 wins

- Babyface (3 solo, 1 with L.A. Reid)

3 wins

- Jack Antonoff
- David Foster
- Quincy Jones (2 solo, 1 with Michael Jackson)
- Pharrell Williams (2 solo, 1 with The Neptunes)

2 wins

- Peter Asher
- Greg Kurstin
- Arif Mardin
- Rick Rubin

== Producers with multiple nominations ==
11 nominations

- Jimmy Jam and Terry Lewis

8 nominations

- David Foster

7 nominations

- Quincy Jones

6 nominations

- Babyface

5 nominations

- Jack Antonoff
- Dan Auerbach
- Rob Cavallo
- Nigel Godrich
- Danger Mouse
- Rick Rubin

4 nominations

- Walter Afanasieff
- Peter Asher
- T-Bone Burnett
- Dernst "D'Mile" Emile II
- Greg Kurstin
- Arif Mardin

3 nominations

- Dr. Dre
- Don Gehman
- Blake Mills
- Brendan O'Brien
- Michael Omartian
- Hugh Padgham
- Phil Ramone
- Ricky Reed
- L.A. Reid
- Lionel Richie
- Narada Michael Walden
- Stevie Wonder

2 nominations

- Bee Gees
- Dave Cobb
- Brian Eno
- Albhy Galuten
- Hit-Boy
- Mutt Lange
- Max Martin
- Dan Nigro
- Prince
- Karl Richardson
- The Smeezingtons
- Bill Szymczyk
- Lenny Waronker

== See also ==
- Grammy Award for Producer of the Year, Classical
- List of Grammy Award categories
