= Try (Nelly Furtado song) =

2004 single by Nelly Furtado

Single by Nelly Furtado

from the album Folklore
- B-side: "I'm Like a Bird"
- Released: February 23, 2004
- Studio: 4th Street Recording (Santa Monica, California)
- Length: 4:38
- Label: DreamWorks
- Songwriters: Nelly Furtado; Brian West
- Producers: Track & Field; Nelly Furtado

Nelly Furtado singles chronology
"Powerless (Say What You Want)" (2003)	"Try" (2004)	"Força" (2004)

Music video
- "Try" on YouTube

"Try" is a song by Canadian singer-songwriter Nelly Furtado, taken from her second studio album, Folklore (2003). The song, written by Furtado herself, and Brian West, was released as the second single from the album in February 2004. The song was moderately successful in several European countries, including Italy, the Netherlands, and the United Kingdom, where it reached the top 20. In the United States, it peaked at number 29 on the Billboard Adult Top 40 chart.

Lyrically, Furtado said the song "is about the reality of love. My energy used to just go everywhere, but now I'm more grounded because I've found true love. The idea here is that, yeah, sometimes life sucks. But life is only so long, and somebody can come along who makes you want to be a better person. You just have to roll with the punches. So "Try" is not a happy-go-lucky song. It has a strange arrangement because the chorus happens only twice, and the end is improvisational. It's like one of those epic power ballads." The Los Angeles Times said of "Try", "Her unfettered enthusiasm wins out as she sings of passion for life".

== Commercial release ==
Although the single was a success in some European countries, it did not chart in the United States. "Try" was the last single released from Folklore in the US; the subsequent singles were released only in Canada, Europe and Latin America. Two versions of the song exist; the original with the chorus only occurring twice, and a radio edit version in which the improv is taken out at the end and an extra chorus is added. A Spanish version, "Dar", was released in 2007 in the album of Loose (Summer Edition) only available in Latin America.

== Music video ==
The music video was directed by Sophie Muller. The music video features Nelly Furtado and the actor Ben Ciaramello in traditional Portuguese dress, around the Settler time period. It shows their various hardships, and in one scene, Furtado is seen tying lover's knots to the underside of the couple's bedsprings, which is assumed to be an infertility cure from folklore. There is an alternate version of the video, that shows Furtado singing the song with a guitar near the sea. The video uses a different mix of the song instead of the Radio Edit version.

== Track listings ==
UK CD maxi-single

No.	Title	Length
1.	"Try" (radio edit)
2.	"I'm Like a Bird" (acoustic live on New Ground)
3.	"Powerless (Say What You Want)" (video)

European CD single and German mini-CD single

No.	Title	Length
1.	"Try" (radio edit)	3:49
2.	"I'm Like a Bird" (acoustic live on New Ground)	4:33

Australian CD maxi-single

No.	Title	Length
1.	"Try" (radio edit)	3:49
2.	"I'm Like a Bird" (acoustic live on New Ground)	4:33
3.	"Try" (acoustic version)	4:42
4.	"Try" (video)

European premium CD maxi-single

No.	Title	Length
1.	"Try" (radio edit)	3:49
2.	"I'm Like a Bird" (acoustic live on New Ground)	4:33
3.	"Try" (acoustic version)	4:42
4.	"Powerless (Say What You Want)" (alternative acoustic mix)	3:47
5.	"Try" (video)

== Credits and personnel ==
Credits are lifted from the Folklore album booklet.

Studios

- Recorded at 4th Street Recording (Santa Monica, California)
- Mastered at Bernie Grundman Mastering (Hollywood, California)

Personnel

- Nelly Furtado – writing, lead and background vocals, production
- Brian West – writing, engineering
- Track & Field – production, programming
  - Field – intro guitar
- James Bryan – acoustic and electric guitars
- Mike Elizondo – bass
- Alex Alessandroni – piano, echo harmonium
- Joey Waronker – drums
- Russ Miller – drums
- Bob Leatherbarrow – vibraphone
- Lil' Jaz – scratching
- Brad Haehnel – mixing, engineering
- Joe Labatto – engineering
- Neil Couser – engineering assistance
- Brian "Big Bass" Gardner – mastering

== Charts ==
=== Weekly charts ===
Weekly chart performance for "Try"
Chart (2004)	Peak position
Australia (ARIA)	61
Austria (Ö3 Austria Top 40)	27
Canada CHR (Nielsen BDS)	15
Canada CHR/Pop Top 30 (Radio & Records)	16
Canada Hot AC Top 30 (Radio & Records)	7
Portugal (AFP)	1
Germany (GfK)	31
Ireland (IRMA)	42
Italy (FIMI)	19
Netherlands (Dutch Top 40)	10
Netherlands (Single Top 100)	21
Russia Airplay (TopHit)	117
Scottish Singles Sales (Official Charts)	17
Switzerland (Schweizer Hitparade)	22
UK Singles (Official Charts)	15
US Adult Pop Airplay (Billboard)	29

=== Year-end charts ===
Year-end chart performance for "Try"
Chart (2004)	Position
Netherlands (Dutch Top 40)	55
Netherlands (Single Top 100)	98
US Adult Top 40 (Billboard)	94

== Certifications ==
Certifications for "Try"
Region	Certification	Certified units/sales
Canada (Music Canada)	Gold	40,000^{‡}
^{‡} Sales+streaming figures based on certification alone.

== Release history ==
Release dates and formats for "Try"
Region	Date	Format(s)	Label	Ref.
United States	February 23, 2004	Hot adult contemporary; triple A radio	DreamWorks	
United Kingdom	March 15, 2004	CD	DreamWorks	
United Kingdom	March 15, 2004	Digital download	DreamWorks	
Australia	March 29, 2004	CD	DreamWorks	
