= Explode (Nelly Furtado song) =

Single by Nelly Furtado

from the album Folklore
- Released: 27 September 2004
- Recorded: 2003
- Studio: Metalworks Studios (Missisauga, Ontario); The Gymnasium (Santa Monica, CA)
- Length: 3:45
- Label: DreamWorks
- Songwriters: Nelly Furtado; Gerald Eaton
- Producers: Track & Field; Nelly Furtado

Nelly Furtado singles chronology
"Força" (2004)	"Explode" (2004)	"The Grass Is Green" (2005)

Music video
- "Explode" on YouTube

"Explode" is a song written by Canadian singer Nelly Furtado and Gerald Eaton for Furtado's second studio album, Folklore (2003). It is produced by Eaton and was released in September 2004 as the fourth single from the album. The song charted in the top 40 in Netherlands, Switzerland and Germany. Furtado said the song "came from a poem I wrote called Teenage Waste. When you're a teenager, you want to try everything; you're like a little firecracker. Your wiser self is there, somewhere deep down, depending on how young or old your soul is. But it doesn’t always show itself. "Explode" is visceral; it's guttural. That's why part of the song uses terms from Capoeira, the Brazilian martial arts form. It touches on teenage experimentation and bliss and fun, but also on some violence and aggression."

== Music video ==
The video for "Explode" was shot in the Central Technical School in Toronto, Ontario and directed by Bradley Cayford and Nelly Furtado. It starts with the real Furtado walking into a room with her guitar singing in front of a microphone. It then shows the cartoon Furtado walking at school with her guitar case. At the chorus it has intercuts of the real Furtado and the cartoon version. The cartoon version is running to her tree house in the forest for the second verse while the real Furtado is singing. The cartoon then starts to write a song as the viewer gets an insight to the character's imagination and a legend of three monsters living in the forest. The cartoon Furtado runs into the forest where she sees the monsters and begins to dance with them. The cartoon Furtado is then seen back in the tree house, writing the song. The conclusion of the video shows the real Furtado singing behind the microphone while playing guitar then leaving the same room. There is an alternate version of the video that shows Nelly singing the song in black and white beside a river.

== Track listing ==
European CD maxi-single

No.	Title	Length
1.	"Explode" (Album Version)	3:45
2.	"Força" (Armand van Helden Remix)	8:20
3.	"Força" (Rui da Silva Vocal Remix)	8:00

European 2-track CD single

No.	Title	Length
1.	"Explode" (Album Version)	3:45
2.	"Força" (Armand van Helden Remix)	8:20

European Premium CD maxi-single

No.	Title	Length
1.	"Explode" (Album Version)	3:45
2.	"Força" (Armand van Helden Remix)	8:20
3.	"Força" (Rui da Silva Vocal Remix)	8:00
4.	"Explode" (Video)	3:46

== Charts ==
Chart (2004)	Peak position
Austria (Ö3 Austria Top 40)	54
Belgium (Ultratip Bubbling Under Flanders)	6
Canada Hot AC Top 30 (Radio & Records)	20
Netherlands (Dutch Top 40)	13
Netherlands (Single Top 100)	36
Germany (GfK)	34
Switzerland (Schweizer Hitparade)	38

== Release history ==
Country	Date	Format	Label	Ref.
Germany	27 September 2004	CD single	Universal	
Germany	27 September 2004	Digital download	Universal	
Germany	27 September 2004	Maxi single	Universal	
Canada	8 October 2004	Maxi single	Universal	
