= Folklore (Nelly Furtado album) =

2003 studio album by Nelly Furtado

Studio album by Nelly Furtado
- Released: November 5, 2003
- Studios: The Gymnasium; 4th Street Recordings (Santa Monica, California); Metalworks Studios (Mississauga, Ontario); Left Brain Studios; 1st Congregational Church (Los Angeles, California)
- Genres: World; pop rock
- Length: 50:26
- Languages: English; Portuguese
- Label: DreamWorks
- Producers: Mike Elizondo; Nelly Furtado; Lil' Jaz; Gerald Eaton; Brian West

Nelly Furtado chronology
| Whoa, Nelly! (2000) | Folklore (2003) | Loose (2006) |

Singles from Folklore
- 1. "Powerless (Say What You Want)" Released: October 6, 2003; 2. "Try" Released: February 23, 2004; 3. "Força" Released: June 7, 2004; 4. "Explode" Released: September 27, 2004; 5. "The Grass Is Green" Released: February 14, 2005

Folklore is the second studio album by Canadian singer-songwriter Nelly Furtado, released on November 5, 2003, through DreamWorks Records. While the album did not match the success of her previous album in such markets as the United States and Australia, it did however become a success in several European countries. Folklore spawned five singles: "Powerless (Say What You Want)", "Try", "Força", "Explode" and "The Grass Is Green". As of 2008, the album had sold 2 million copies worldwide.

Primarily a world and pop rock album, Folklore also incorporates ethnic, pop, folk, alternative pop and worldbeat elements.

== Background ==
The album's title was influenced by Furtado's parents' immigration to Canada, "When I look at my old photo albums, I see pictures of their brand-new house, their shiny new car, their first experiences going to very North American-type places like Kmart. When you have that in your blood, you never really part with it – it becomes your own personal folklore." Furtado attributed the mellowness of the album to the fact that she was pregnant during most of its recording. "Saturdays" features vocals by Jarvis Church and "Island of Wonder" features vocals by Caetano Veloso.

Folklore includes the single "Força" (meaning "carry on" or "strength" in Portuguese), which was written as the official anthem of the UEFA Euro 2004. Furtado performed the song at the championship's final in Lisbon, in July 2004. Other singles included the ballad "Try" and "Powerless (Say What You Want)", in which she embraces her Portuguese heritage; the song deals with "the idea that you can still feel like a minority inside, even if you don't look like one on the outside". Additional singles were released in certain territories; "Explode" in Canada and Europe, and "The Grass Is Green" in Germany.

== Critical reception ==
Professional ratings
Aggregate scores
| Source | Rating |
|---|---|
| Metacritic | 60/100 |
Review scores
| Source | Rating |
| AllMusic | 4/5 stars |
| Blender | 2/5 stars |
| Dotmusic | 3/10 |
| Entertainment Weekly | A− |
| The Guardian | 3/5 stars |
| Now | 2/5 stars |
| Rolling Stone | 2/5 stars |
| Slant Magazine | 4/5 stars |
| Spin | 6/10 |
| The Times | 4/5 stars |

Folklore received mixed reviews from critics. Caroline Sullivan from The Guardian remarked that Folklore was "essentially the sound of an artist taking a risk (and, amazingly, being allowed by her label to do it)" and called the album an "admittedly brave follow-up [that] is a long way from pop'n'breakbeats." David Browne from Entertainment Weekly found that Whoa, Nelly!'s "left-field success appears to have played with her head, making her not a little self-righteous and defensive." He noted that Furtado's "exultant music goes on its merry, multicultural way." Amy Linden of The Village Voice noted that Folklore "may be more focused than Whoa, Nelly!'s candy-coated culture clash, but mature doesn't translate to dull [...] Armed with a Fendi bag and a fiddle, Nelly has figured out a way to find one's bliss and shake one's ass. Her grown-up pop still believes in girl power." As she focused more on the songwriting, rather "than on frenetically switching genres five times in one song," the BBC felt that it had "twice the originality" of her debut. Slant Magazine's Sal Cinquemani concluded that "if Whoa, Nelly! was the introduction of a promising new talent, Folklore is the transition that builds on that promise and brims with life, even if it does include a misstep or two."

AllMusic's Stephen Thomas Erlewine stated that "[w]hile there are some interesting musical moments on Folklore – enough to make it worth a listen – the dogged seriousness and didactic worldview become a bit overbearing not long before the album is a quarter of the way finished, particularly since the fusion of worldbeat and adult alternative pop often seems heavy-handed." Will Hermes from Spin wrote that Folklore's "nicely realized conceit, involving identity and heritage, lets the multiculti Canadian Furtado get her Portuguese on [but] while the vocals and arrangements are more ambitious and arguably better, there's less free play, less of the goofiness and kewpie-dancehall scatting that defined her." Jenny Eliscu from Rolling Stone gave a negative review, calling Folklore "slick, multicultural hodgepodge" but "without a single as good as "I'm Like a Bird"." Noel Murray, writing for The A.V. Club felt that while "few tracks on Folklore stand out, the album hangs together agreeably," while Now's Sarah Liss described the album as a "muddled stylistic mess of overly chilled beats and bland, indistinct melodies."

== Commercial performance ==
The album debuted at number eighteen on the Canadian Albums Chart with first-week sales of 10,400, and at number thirty-eight on the US Billboard 200 chart, selling 68,000 in its first week. According to Nielsen SoundScan, it had sold 425,000 copies in the US by August 2008. It was not as successful as Furtado's debut album, Whoa, Nelly! (2000), partly because of troubles at DreamWorks Records and the less poppy sound. It lacked promotion because DreamWorks was sold to Universal Music Group at the time of Folklore's release, and it spent only eleven weeks on the US Billboard 200 chart. In 2005, DreamWorks Records was shut down and many of its artists, including Furtado, were absorbed into Geffen Records. The album's greatest success was in Germany where it peaked at number four and finished as the fifth best-selling album of 2004, eventually getting certified multi-platinum there. Furtado noticed that the album's success in the region and said, "Why do Germans love this album? I think I figured it out: It's so cerebral. It's great in its own way, but that's a different side."

== Track listing ==
All tracks produced by Nelly Furtado, Gerald Eaton and Brian West, except for "The Grass Is Green" which is produced by Furtado and Mike Elizondo and "Island of Wonder" which is produced by Furtado, Lil' Jaz, Eaton and West.

Folklore – Standard edition
| No. | Title | Writer(s) | Length |
|---|---|---|---|
| 1. | "One-Trick Pony" (featuring Kronos Quartet) | Furtado; Eaton; West | 4:47 |
| 2. | "Powerless (Say What You Want)" | Furtado; Eaton; West; Trevor Horn; Anne Dudley; Malcolm McLaren | 3:53 |
| 3. | "Explode" | Furtado; Eaton | 3:45 |
| 4. | "Try" | Furtado; West | 4:38 |
| 5. | "Fresh Off the Boat" | Furtado; Eaton; West | 3:16 |
| 6. | "Força" | Furtado; Eaton; West | 3:40 |
| 7. | "The Grass Is Green" | Furtado; Elizondo | 3:51 |
| 8. | "Picture Perfect" | Furtado; Eaton; West | 5:16 |
| 9. | "Saturdays" (featuring Jarvis Church) | Furtado | 2:05 |
| 10. | "Build You Up" | Furtado; Eaton; West | 4:58 |
| 11. | "Island of Wonder" (featuring Caetano Veloso) | Furtado; Jasper Gahunia; Simón Díaz | 3:48 |
| 12. | "Childhood Dreams" | Furtado | 6:33 |
| Total length: | | | 50:26 |

Folklore – UK edition (bonus track)
| No. | Title | Length |
|---|---|---|
| 13. | "Try" (acoustic) | 4:41 |

Folklore – Japanese edition (bonus tracks)
| No. | Title | Length |
|---|---|---|
| 13. | "Powerless (Say What You Want)" (alternative acoustic mix) | 3:49 |
| 14. | "Try" (acoustic) | 4:41 |

Folklore – Latin American re-issue
| No. | Title | Length |
|---|---|---|
| 13. | "Powerless (Say What You Want)" (featuring Juanes) | 3:57 |

Samples

- "Powerless (Say What You Want)" contains elements from "Buffalo Gals" by Malcolm McLaren.
- "Island of Wonder" contains elements from "Tonada de Luna Llena" by Caetano Veloso.

== Personnel ==
Credits adapted from the Folklore liner notes.

- Nelly Furtado – lead and background vocals, lyricist, songwriting, acoustic guitar
- Caetano Veloso – lead and background vocals (11)
- Gerald Eaton – electric harmonium (right hand), tambourine, B3 organ, background vocals
- Brian West – acoustic guitar, flange guitar, electric harmonium (left hand), squeaky organ, rhythm guitar, telecaster, stadium guitar, space echo guitar, electric mantra guitar, pedals, Rhodes
- George Doerling – banjo, mandolín, cavaquinho, dulcimer, Hawaiian mini-guitar
- Russ Miller – percussion, drums
- David Harrington – violin (1)
- John Sherba – violin (1)
- Hank Dutt – viola (1)
- Jennifer Culp – cello (1)
- Stephen Prutsman – string arrangement
- Steve Carnelli – banjo, mandolín
- James Bryan – acoustic guitar, electric guitar, island guitar, tender rogue guitar
- Mike Elizondo – echoplex slide guitar, bass
- Michael Einziger – lead guitar, drill guitar, chime guitar
- Brad Haehnhel – fireworks display
- Joey Waronker – drums
- Bob Leatherbarrow – vibraphone
- Alex Alessandroni – piano, echo harmonium
- Jasper Gahunia – scratching, scratch effects, subliminal speeches
- Justin Meldal-Johnsen – Ocean bass
- Alan Molnar – vibraphone
- Béla Fleck – banjo
- Gurpreet Chana – tabla
- Dean Jarvis – bass
- Luis Simãõ – accordion
- Daniel Stone – percussion, Shakere, Caxixi, finger cymbals, cajon, congas, chascarra de gaita
- Jef Ten Kortenaar – violin
- David Wadly – violin
- Amanda Goodburn – viola
- Orly Bitou – cello
- David Campbell – arranger
- Mike Fratantuno – upright bass
- Jon Levine – piano
- Rafael Gomez – acoustic guitar, Portuguese shout outs
- Manuela Furtado – whistling
- Kyle Erwin – Huge organ, chimes, 64-foot pipes
- Vonette Yanaglmnuma – harp

=== Production ===
- Nelly Furtado – producer
- Track – producer, programming
- Field – producer, programming, engineering
- Lil' Jazz – producer, programming, additional engineering
- Mike Elizondo – producer, programming
- Brad Haehnhel – mixing, engineering
- Joseph Lobato – engineering
- Adam Hawkins – engineering
- Marcelo Sabola – engineering
- Steve Chahley – assistant engineering
- Ian Bodzasi – assistant engineering
- Chris Gordon – assistant engineering
- Neil Couser – assistant engineering
- Brian Gardner – mastering
- Bernie Grundman – mastering
- Beth Halper – A&R
- Jennifer Ross – A&R coordinator
- Frances Pennington – creative director
- Gravis Inc. – art direction, design
- Warrick Saint – cover photo
- Isabel Snyder – photography

== Charts ==
=== Weekly charts ===
Weekly chart performance for Folklore
| Chart (2003–2004) | Peak position |
|---|---|
| Australian Albums (ARIA) | 82 |
| Austrian Albums (Ö3 Austria) | 10 |
| Belgian Albums (Ultratop Flanders) | 12 |
| Canadian Albums (Nielsen SoundScan) | 18 |
| Dutch Albums (Album Top 100) | 4 |
| French Albums (SNEP) | 122 |
| German Albums (Offizielle Top 100) | 4 |
| Italian Albums (FIMI) | 35 |
| Japanese Albums (Oricon) | 28 |
| Mexican Albums (Top 100 Mexico) | 65 |
| Portuguese Albums (AFP) | 2 |
| Scottish Albums (Official Charts) | 15 |
| Swiss Albums (Schweizer Hitparade) | 13 |
| UK Albums (Official Charts) | 11 |
| US Billboard 200 | 38 |

=== Year-end charts ===
Year-end chart performance for Folklore
| Chart (2004) | Position |
|---|---|
| Austrian Albums (Ö3 Austria) | 31 |
| Belgian Albums (Ultratop Flanders) | 69 |
| Dutch Albums (Album Top 100) | 15 |
| German Albums (Offizielle Top 100) | 5 |
| Swiss Albums (Schweizer Hitparade) | 21 |
| UK Albums (OCC) | 109 |

== Certifications ==
Certifications for Folklore
| Region | Certification | Certified units/sales |
|---|---|---|
| Belgium (BRMA) | Gold | 25,000^{*} |
| Canada (Music Canada) | Platinum | 100,000^{^} |
| Germany (BVMI) | 2× Platinum | 400,000^{‡} |
| Netherlands (NVPI) | Gold | 40,000^{^} |
| New Zealand (RMNZ) | Gold | 7,500^{^} |
| Portugal (AFP) | Gold | 20,000^{^} |
| Switzerland (IFPI Switzerland) | Platinum | 40,000^{^} |
| United Kingdom (BPI) | Gold | 245,000 |
| United States (RIAA) | Gold | 425,000 |
Summaries
| Worldwide | — | 2,000,000 |
^{*} Sales figures based on certification alone.^{^} Shipments figures based on certification alone.^{‡} Sales+streaming figures based on certification alone.

== Release history ==
List of release dates, showing region, label, editions and reference
| Region | Date | Label | Edition(s) | Ref |
|---|---|---|---|---|
| United States | November 5, 2003 | Digital download | SKG | |
| Australia | November 23, 2003 | CD | Universal Music | |
| Germany | November 24, 2003 | CD | Universal Music | |
| United Kingdom | November 24, 2003 | CD | Polydor | |
| Canada | November 25, 2003 | CD | Universal Music | |
| Ukraine | November 25, 2003 | CD | Universal Music | |
| United States | November 25, 2003 | CD | DreamWorks | |
| Japan | January 21, 2004 | CD | Universal Music | |
