= Megalithic Symphony =

- Standard edition cover. The deluxe edition features the same image at sunrise, while the 10th anniversary edition features it at sunset.

Studio album by Awolnation
- Released: March 15, 2011
- Studios: Red Bull Studios, AWOLSTUDIO, Avatar Studios, Main and Market, Gymnasium, Fireside Sound Studio
- Genres: Electronic rock; electropop; alternative rock; indie rock; pop rock
- Length: 52:52 (standard edition); 2:08:21 (deluxe edition)
- Label: Red Bull
- Producers: Aaron Bruno; Jimmy Messer; Brian West

Awolnation chronology
| Back from Earth (2010) | Megalithic Symphony (2011) | Run (2015) |

Singles from Megalithic Symphony
- 1. "Sail" Released: November 8, 2010; 2. "Not Your Fault" Released: October 17, 2011; 3. "Kill Your Heroes" Released: June 5, 2012

Professional ratings
Review scores
| Source | Rating |
|---|---|
| AllMusic | 3.5/5 stars |
| Alternative Press | 2.5/5 stars |
| Classic Rock | 7/10 stars |
| Rock Sound | 9/10 |

Megalithic Symphony is the debut studio album by American rock band Awolnation, released on March 15, 2011, through Red Bull Records. The album is the band's first full-length release, following the release of the extended play Back From Earth (2010). Megalithic Symphony has since peaked at number 84 on the United States Billboard 200 and at number 57 on the Austrian Albums Chart. As of March 2015, the album sold 581,000 copies in the United States. The deluxe edition of the album was released on November 19, 2013.

On February 29, 2016, the RIAA certified Megalithic Symphony platinum.

In 2021, for the album's 10th anniversary, a special edition of it was released, including three unreleased songs and live performances of some older songs, for a total of 27 bonus tracks.

== Track listing ==
All tracks are written by Aaron Bruno, with additional writers noted.

| No. | Title | Writer(s) | Length |
|---|---|---|---|
| 1. | "Megalithic Symphony" | | 0:58 |
| 2. | "Some Sort of Creature" | | 0:27 |
| 3. | "Soul Wars" | Eric Stenman | 3:37 |
| 4. | "People" | Stenman | 3:58 |
| 5. | "Jump on My Shoulders" | | 4:08 |
| 6. | "Burn It Down" | Jimmy Messer | 2:45 |
| 7. | "Guilty Filthy Soul" | Messer | 3:34 |
| 8. | "Kill Your Heroes" | Brian West | 2:59 |
| 9. | "My Nightmare's Dream" | | 0:27 |
| 10. | "Sail" | | 4:19 |
| 11. | "Wake Up" | | 3:02 |
| 12. | "Not Your Fault" | | 4:02 |
| 13. | "All I Need" | Messer | 3:37 |
| 14. | "Knights of Shame" (fades out at 11:50, untitled hidden track starts at 13:51) | Cameron Duddy | 14:58 |
| Total length: | | | 52:52 |

Amazon bonus track
| No. | Title | Length |
|---|---|---|
| 15. | "Shoestrings" | 3:09 |

iTunes bonus track (United Kingdom)
| No. | Title | Length |
|---|---|---|
| 15. | "I've Been Dreaming" | 2:58 |

iTunes bonus track (United States)
| No. | Title | Length |
|---|---|---|
| 15. | "Swinging from the Castles" | 3:04 |

Deluxe edition
| No. | Title | Length |
|---|---|---|
| 1. | "THISKIDSNOTALRIGHT" (From Injustice: Gods Among Us : The Album) | 2:42 |
| 2. | "Some Kind of Joke" (From Iron Man 3: Heroes Fall Soundtrack) | 4:52 |
| 3. | "Everybody's Got a Secret" (From Frankenweenie Unleashed! Compilation) | 3:43 |
| 4. | "Soul Wars" (Live in Salzburg, Austria) | 4:23 |
| 5. | "MF" | 3:17 |
| 6. | "Swinging from the Castles" | 3:04 |
| 7. | "I've Been Dreaming" | 2:58 |
| 8. | "Shoestrings" | 3:09 |
| 9. | "Not Your Fault" (Robert DeLong Remix) | 5:52 |
| 10. | "People" (Thomas from Ghostland Observatory Remix) | 5:41 |
| 11. | "Burn It Down" (Innerpartysystem Remix) | 4:56 |
| 12. | "Guilty Filthy Soul" (Samantha Ronson Remix featuring Wale) | 4:18 |
| 13. | "Jump on My Shoulders" (Thomas from Ghostland Observatory Remix) | 4:06 |
| 14. | "Sail" (Borgore Pop The Sweating I'm Sailing Remix) | 4:38 |
| 15. | "Sail" (Dan The Automator Remix) | 4:34 |
| 16. | "Sail" (Feed Me Remix) | 3:29 |
| 17. | "Sail" (TDE Remix featuring Kendrick Lamar and Ab-Soul) | 4:00 |
| 18. | "Sail" (Unlimited Gravity Remix) | 5:49 |

10th Anniversary Edition
| No. | Title | Length |
|---|---|---|
| 15. | "Cannibals" | 2:28 |
| 16. | "I'm No Good" | 3:13 |
| 17. | "Wichita Panama" | 3:52 |

== Lyrical content ==
=== "Some Sort of Creature" ===
In a live Facebook Q&A session, Bruno described "Some Sort of Creature" as something he truly experienced. "What you hear on that track, a sort of segue track, is really what actually happened! And that's really all I can describe; it's me speaking to myself, because I didn’t want to forget this thing I saw. And it's all right there in the song."

== Reception ==
Megalithic Symphony received critical acclaim. The album was praised in a 2011 review for Bruno's ability to combine electronic and organic songwriting with soulful, rough and melodic vocals. A reviewer for Louder Sound praised the eclectic sound and described the 14-minute Knights of Shame as sounding like Muse if they gave a toss about playlists.

However, a reviewer on Sputnik Music called it "hit-or-miss" and noted that the album "has a ton of ideas, but doesn't know what to do with them."

== Personnel ==
Sourced from the original album liner notes.

Awolnation

- Aaron Bruno – vocals and synthesizer (all tracks except 2 and 9), drums (tracks 1, 4–12, 14), percussion (tracks 1, 3, 4, 11), keyboards (tracks 1, 12, 14), bass guitar (tracks 1, 5, 10), guitar (tracks 5, 7, 14), piano (tracks 10, 13), Fender Rhodes electric piano (track 7), synth bass (tracks 11, 12, 14); additional bass guitar and drums (track 3); string arrangement (track 10)
- Drew Stewart – guitar (tracks 3, 11)
- Christopher Thorn – guitar (tracks 5, 10, 11)
- Kenny Carkeet – synthesizer (track 5)
- Hayden Scott – drums (track 5)
- David Amezcua – bass guitar (track 14)

Additional musicians

- Jimmy Messer – guitar (tracks 3, 4, 6–8, 11–14), drums (tracks 6, 7, 13), synthesizer (tracks 6, 7), bass guitar (track 6), synth bass (track 7), keyboards (track 13)
- Billy Mohler – bass guitar (tracks 3, 4, 7, 8, 10–13)
- Tony Royster Jr. – drums (track 3)
- Brian West – Casio keyboards and synthesizer (track 8)
- Watts Choir – vocals (tracks 4, 9, 13)
- Arielle Verinis – vocals (track 11)
- Cameron Duddy, Curtain$ and Tarrah Toland – vocals (track 14)
- Eric Stenman – engineer, mixer, additional production; whistling (track 10)

== Charts ==
=== Weekly charts ===
| Chart (2011–2014) | Peak position |
|---|---|
| Australian Hitseekers Albums (ARIA) | 4 |
| Austrian Albums (Ö3 Austria) | 57 |
| Canadian Albums (Nielsen SoundScan) | 53 |
| UK Albums (OCC) | 165 |
| UK Independent Albums (Official Charts) | 13 |
| US Billboard 200 | 84 |
| US Independent Albums (Billboard) | 9 |
| US Top Alternative Albums (Billboard) | 16 |
| US Top Rock Albums (Billboard) | 21 |

=== Year-end charts ===
| Chart (2011) | Position |
|---|---|
| US Independent Albums (Billboard) | 38 |

| Chart (2012) | Position |
|---|---|
| US Billboard 200 | 158 |
| US Independent Albums (Billboard) | 13 |
| US Top Alternative Albums (Billboard) | 30 |
| US Top Rock Albums (Billboard) | 42 |

| Chart (2013) | Position |
|---|---|
| US Billboard 200 | 163 |
| US Independent Albums (Billboard) | 12 |
| US Top Alternative Albums (Billboard) | 45 |
| US Top Rock Albums (Billboard) | 45 |

| Chart (2014) | Position |
|---|---|
| US Independent Albums (Billboard) | 40 |

== Certifications ==
| Region | Certification | Certified units/sales |
|---|---|---|
| Canada (Music Canada) | 2× Platinum | 160,000^{‡} |
| New Zealand (RMNZ) | Platinum | 15,000^{‡} |
| United States (RIAA) | Platinum | 1,000,000^{‡} |
^{‡} Sales+streaming figures based on certification alone.

== Release history ==
| Region | Date | Format | Label | Catalog no. |
|---|---|---|---|---|
| United States | March 15, 2011 | Digital download | Red Bull | n/a |
| United States | March 29, 2011 | CD | Red Bull | RBR1086 |
| Belgium | July 1, 2011 | Digital download | Red Bull | n/a |
| France | July 1, 2011 | Digital download | Red Bull | n/a |
| Germany | July 1, 2011 | Digital download | Red Bull | n/a |
| Netherlands | July 1, 2011 | Digital download | Red Bull | n/a |
| Spain | July 1, 2011 | Digital download | Red Bull | n/a |
| United Kingdom | July 1, 2011 | Digital download | Red Bull | n/a |
| Belgium | July 4, 2011 | CD | Red Bull | RBR1108 |
| France | July 4, 2011 | CD | Red Bull | RBR1108 |
| Germany | July 4, 2011 | CD | Red Bull | RBR1108 |
| Netherlands | July 4, 2011 | CD | Red Bull | RBR1108 |
| Spain | July 4, 2011 | CD | Red Bull | RBR1108 |
| United Kingdom | July 4, 2011 | CD | Red Bull | RBR1108 |
| United States | December 9, 2011 | 2xLP | Red Bull | RBR1134 |
| Australia | April 13, 2012 | Digital download | Red Bull | n/a |
| New Zealand | April 13, 2012 | Digital download | Red Bull | n/a |
| Australia | May 25, 2012 | CD | Red Bull | Unknown |
| New Zealand | May 28, 2012 | CD | Red Bull | Unknown |
Deluxe Edition (First Issue)
| Belgium | January 25, 2013 | Digital download | Red Bull | n/a |
| France | January 25, 2013 | Digital download | Red Bull | n/a |
| Germany | January 25, 2013 | Digital download | Red Bull | n/a |
| Netherlands | January 25, 2013 | Digital download | Red Bull | n/a |
| Spain | January 25, 2013 | Digital download | Red Bull | n/a |
| United Kingdom | January 25, 2013 | Digital download | Red Bull | n/a |
Deluxe Edition (Second Issue)
| Australia | November 15, 2013 | Digital download | Red Bull | n/a |
| United States | November 19, 2013 | Digital download | Red Bull | n/a |
| United Kingdom | November 25, 2013 | Digital download | Red Bull | n/a |
10th Anniversary Edition
| Worldwide | March 15, 2021 | Digital download | Red Bull | n/a |
