= Not Your Fault =

Single by Awolnation

from the album Megalithic Symphony
- B-side: "Sail" (LED remix)
- Released: October 17, 2011
- Recorded: 2010–2011
- Studio: Red Bull Recording, Los Angeles, California
- Length: 4:03
- Label: Red Bull
- Songwriter: Aaron Bruno
- Producer: Aaron Bruno

Awolnation singles chronology
"Sail" (2010)	"Not Your Fault" (2011)	"Kill Your Heroes" (2012)

Music video
- "Not Your Fault" on YouTube

"Not Your Fault" is a song by American alternative rock band Awolnation. It was written by frontman Aaron Bruno and recorded by the band for their debut studio album Megalithic Symphony, where it appears as the twelfth track. "Not Your Fault" was released to American modern rock radio on October 17, 2011, and was also released as a single in the United Kingdom and Bosnia on February 26, 2012. The single peaked at numbers three and eleven on the US Billboard Alternative Songs and Rock Songs charts, respectively.

== Music video ==
The music video for "Not Your Fault" utilizes pixilation, clay animation and stop motion, similar to Peter Gabriel's "Sledgehammer" and the animation style of Dino Stamatopoulos. In the video, frontman Aaron Bruno is shown singing the song as he and his band—in clay animation style—trying to defeat monsters. Bruno is also shown attracting a girl and saving her in the process. A 3D version of the music video was also featured in the Nintendo 3DS video service Nintendo Video.

== Track listing ==
Digital download
No.	Title	Length
1.	"Not Your Fault"	4:02
2.	"Sail" (LED Remix)	4:30

== Personnel ==
Sourced from the original album liner notes.

Awolnation

- Aaron Bruno – lead and backing vocals, keyboards, synthesizers, synth-bass, drums

Additional Musicians

- Jimmy Messer - electric guitar
- Billy Mohler - bass guitar

== Charts ==
=== Weekly charts ===
Chart (2011–12)	Peak position
Canada Rock (Billboard)	17
US Hot Rock & Alternative Songs (Billboard)	11

=== Year-end charts ===
Chart (2012)	Peak position
US Hot Rock Songs (Billboard)	47

== Certifications ==
Region	Certification	Certified units/sales
Canada (Music Canada)	Gold	40,000^{*}
United States (RIAA)	Gold	500,000^{‡}
^{*} Sales figures based on certification alone.^{‡} Sales+streaming figures based on certification alone.

== Release history ==
Country	Date	Format	Label
United States	October 17, 2011	Modern rock radio	Red Bull Records
United States	November 28, 2011	Submodern rock radio	Red Bull Records
Bosnia and Herzegovina	February 26, 2012	Digital download	Red Bull Records
United Kingdom	February 26, 2012	Digital download	Red Bull Records
