= The Grass Is Green =

Single by Nelly Furtado

from the album Folklore
- B-side: "Party (Reprise)"; "My Love Grows Deeper"
- Released: February 14, 2005
- Recorded: 2003
- Studio: Metalworks Studios (Mississauga, Ontario); The Gymnasium (Santa Monica, CA)
- Length: 3:51
- Label: DreamWorks
- Songwriters: Nelly Furtado; Mike Elizondo
- Producer: Mike Elizondo

Nelly Furtado singles chronology
"Explode" (2004)	"The Grass Is Green" (2005)	"No Hay Igual" (2006)

Audio video
- "The Grass Is Green" on YouTube

"The Grass Is Green" is a song recorded by Canadian singer-songwriter Nelly Furtado for her second studio album, Folklore (2003). It was written by Furtado with the song's producer Mike Elizondo. Despite not being released as a single anywhere else but Germany where it peaked at number sixty-five, the song has been separately praised as noteworthy.

== Formats and track listings ==
- International digital single
1. "The Grass Is Green" – 3:51
2. "I Feel You" (featuring Esthero) Non-LP track – 4:11
- European limited CD maxi-single; German digital single
1. "The Grass Is Green" – 3:51
2. "Party (Reprise)" Non-LP track – 4:53
3. "My Love Grows Deeper" Non-LP track – 4:54

== Charts ==
Chart (2005)	Peak position
Germany (GfK)	65
