= Nintendo Video =

Defunct video streaming application

- Logo
- Developer: Nintendo
- Type: Internet video Video on demand
- Launched: JP/EU/AU: July 13, 2011; NA: July 21, 2011
- Discontinued: JP/EU/AU: March 31, 2014; NA: June 29, 2015
- Platforms: Nintendo 3DS, Nintendo 2DS, New Nintendo 3DS
- Operating system: Nintendo 3DS system software
- Status: Discontinued (Note: Most videos were still available on Nintendo eShop prior to the shop's closure on March 27, 2023.)
- Website: www.video.nintendo.com

Nintendo Video (Note: In Japanese as Nintendo Video (Japanese: ニンテンドービデオ, Hepburn: Nintendō Bideo)) was a video on demand service for the Nintendo 3DS which streamed hand-picked 3D and 2D video content from external providers. Some of the studios which broadcast content to the service were CollegeHumor, Aardman Animations, Blue Man Group, Channel Frederator Network, and Mondo Media, among others.

The app first launched in July 2011 for Nintendo 3DS owners worldwide, with Nintendo promising new videos to be released weekly for the service. Nintendo Video was officially discontinued in 2014 in most territories, but the service was still available in North America until July 2015. Many of the videos that were featured on Nintendo Video were then carried over to the Nintendo eShop, where they were accessible until its closure in 2023; users can still redownload them provided they have purchased them prior to the closure.

Some Nintendo Video related content have since been released to other video platforms such as YouTube, however some of the content formerly available on the application is no longer available anywhere and is presumed to be lost.

== History ==
Previously, the service was available as a separate app that utilized SpotPass, downloading videos to the console's SD card via Wi-Fi Internet access for offline viewing. New content could be automatically downloaded via SpotPass, replacing the old content.

The dedicated Nintendo Video app launched in Australia, Europe, and Japan on the 3DS eShop for free on July 13, 2011, with initial videos including Oscar's Oasis and Magic Tricks for the Nintendo 3DS. The app became available in North America a few days later on July 21, 2011. Some of the other first shorts that were available on the app were CollegeHumor's Dinosaur Office and a trailer for Captain America: The First Avenger, with plans to add music videos from Jason Derulo, Foster the People, and the Blue Man Group. Additionally, Nintendo announced that the app would receive an exclusive 3D music video from OK Go, who had previously had a music video released as a downloadable video exclusive to North American 3DS systems before the release of the eShop.

In 2012, Nintendo created a joint venture for Nintendo Video Original Series and distributed their first Original Series for Nintendo Video, Threediots.

== Content ==
Since June 2015, many of the shows listed below can be viewed on-demand via the Nintendo eShop in North America, permanently categorized under Nintendo Video. As of August 2019, a total of 164 videos were available on the eShop. Users had to enter in their date of birth before watching content that was considered too mature.

=== Shows ===
Title	Genre	Studio	eShop	Episodes	Details
Dinosaur Office	Comedy	CollegeHumor	Yes	19	Stop-motion claymation series about an office where the workers are dinosaurs. The series was based on a stop-motion web series released on YouTube by the show's creators. It was later made into a claymation series exclusively for Nintendo Video, animated by Stoopid Buddy Studios. The series was only released in North America and Europe. Episodes of the series were later released on CollegeHumor's official YouTube channel. There were plans for a video game based on the series that was scrapped.
Baman and Piderman	Black comedy	Mondo Media	Yes	7	A series following the adventures of Baman and Piderman, characters who are parodies of Batman and Spider-Man. Only released in North America (In 2D)
Shaun the Sheep	Comedy	Aardman Animation	Yes	15	Original one minute episodes in 3D, based on the TV show. In January 2016, Aardman started to release these shorts on the Shaun the Sheep YouTube channel every Friday, under the title Mossy Bottom Shorts.
Kirby: Right Back at Ya! 3D	Comedy; Action	Warpstar Inc.	Maybe	2	A dubbed version of the 3D-animated Kirby: Right Back at Ya! special. From February 1 through May 1, 2019, it was listed and available for download for 100 platinum points at My Nintendo.
Kid Icarus	Action; Comedy	Production I.G	Yes	3	"Thanatos Rising" involves a fight between Pit and one of Medusa's commanders, Thanatos.
Kid Icarus	Action	Studio 4°C	Yes	3	"Medusa's Revenge" features Medusa, the goddess of the Underworld, as the main character. This short tells the story of Medusa and Palutena's rivalry, which covers a period from far into Pit's past up to the present day, during the events of Kid Icarus: Uprising.
Kid Icarus	Comedy; Action	Shaft	Yes	3	"Palutena's Revolting Dinner" features Palutena as the main character and "her attempts to deal with a great catastrophe in her Skyworld home". It involves her attempting to cook a meal for herself and Pit, only for the ingredients to come to life and begin wreaking havoc.
BearShark	Comedy	CollegeHumor	Yes	13	Nintendo Video original animated series inspired by Road Runner cartoons, where a bear and a shark pursue a man called Steve. A pilot was released on Nintendo Video in 2011, and was later made into a series in 2013, announced as a partnership between Nintendo and CollegeHumor. A video game based on the series was released in 2013 on the eShop, developed by Silverball Studios. Only released in North America and Europe.
The Legend of Zelda: The Misadventures of Link	Comedy	Nintendo	Yes	12	This original series of comedic shorts shows Link, the star of The Legend of Zelda, in a new and hysterical light. The series is based on various parts of The Legend of Zelda: The Wind Waker HD (in 2D)
How to Win at Super Smash Bros.	Tutorial	Nintendo	Yes	10	A tutorial show about how to win at Super Smash Bros. for Nintendo 3DS. (In 2D)
Bravest Warriors	Comedy; Science fantasy Science fiction Adventure; Action	Frederator Studios	Yes	29	A show revolving around the various escapades of four heroes-for-hire. This was produced by Frederator as a part of their Cartoon Hangover YouTube channel. Only released in North America. (In 2D)
Cartoon Conspiracies	Comedy	Frederator Studios	Yes	26	A woman named Emily takes a look at various cartoon-related theories to see how well they hold up to evidence. Five episodes of the show were run on Nintendo Video, although numerous others are on YouTube. Only released in North America. (In 2D)
Bee and PuppyCat	Comedy	Frederator Studios	Yes	5	A show about a job-floating young woman and the adventures she has with her dog/cat hybrid. This was produced by Frederator as a part of their Cartoon Hangover YouTube channel. Only released in North America. (In 2D)
Too Cool Cartoons!	Comedy	Frederator Studios		10	Various shorts from Cartoon Hangover, created by different people as possible series starters. The two-part pilot of Bee and PuppyCat is among this anthology. Only released in North America. (In 2D)
Wildheart Riukiu	Comedy	BONUS.CO.JP	Yes	4	This new series of 3D shorts comes from the creator of Meat or Die, which has already amassed more than 5 million views on Nintendo Video. Wildheart Riukiu incorporates charming 16-bit graphics with some not-so-charming, but hilarious, characters. Think ninja puppets.
WWE Slam City	Comedy Action	WWE	Yes	26	Follow your favorite WWE fighters as how they try to get a job in Slam City. Only released in North America. (In 2D)
Oscar's Oasis	Comedy	TeamTO		?	A lizard named Oscar lives in a desert, usually trying to find food and/or water. Popy, a Fennec Fox; Buck, a Vulture; and Harchi, a Hyena, often compete with him over these essentials, riding in their battered cart through the desert. Only released in Europe.
Meat or Die	Comedy	BONUS.CO.JP	Yes	7	Two monsters fight to get a bite to eat in a New York City overran by creatures.
Marshmallow People	Comedy	Film Cow	Yes	1	Two marshmallows go on a quest to cure their boredom. Only released in North America. (In 2D)
Charlie the Unicorn	Comedy	Film Cow	Yes	1	Charlie and two other unicorns search for Candy Mountain. Only released in North America. (In 2D)
Llamas with Hats	Comedy	Film Cow	Yes	1	Carl the llama wreaks havoc on civilization, much to the displeasure of Paul the llama. Only released in North America (In 2D)
The 3D-Machine	Comedy		No	2	In these videos we follow Igor and the Professor who are on a monster hunt all over the world.
The Mind's Eye	Action		No	3	Follow the adventures of a young man who sees everything differently. In a world consisting of anything your mind can imagine, you get to choose what happens next.
Blue Man Group Nau Shorts	Comedy Music	Nau, Blue Man Group	Yes	5	The Blue Man Group get into different situations based on whatever they find in their gray room, whether it be a large remote or "upgrade" switch.
Pizza Quest	Comedy	CollegeHumor	No	1	An animated pilot created by CollegeHumor exclusively for Nintendo Video featuring a New York City pizza chef going on a journey to find the world's best pizza ingredients. Unlike Dinosaur Office and BearShark, this did not lead into a series. Only released in North America and Europe.
Next Level: Hugs!	Comedy	CollegeHumor	No	1	A live-action pilot, featuring various scenarios of people hugging, the episode involves characters trying take everyday activities to the next level. Unlike Dinosaur Office and BearShark, this did not lead into a series. Only released in North America and Europe.
Duel	Comedy	CollegeHumor	No	1	A live-action pilot that pits together the world's most unlikely fighters into a duel. Unlike Dinosaur Office and BearShark, this did not lead into a series. Only released in North America and Europe.
Threediots	Comedy	Consolidated Baily Inc. and Threediots Inc.	No	6	Nintendo Video original comedy series that revolves around actors Burke (portrayed by Don Fanelli) and Lola (portrayed by Tanisha Long) as they keep their show on the air by dealing with various forces of evil. It was announced during the Nintendo 3DS Software Showcase on June 7, 2012, during E3 2012. Only released in North America.
The Legend of Zelda: The Misadventures of Link	Comedy	Nintendo	No	12	Comedy miniseries released as promotion for The Legend of Zelda: The Wind Waker HD, produced by Nintendo using the machinima technique of synchronizing video footage from a video game using customized camera angles and other in-game modifications. Episodes of the series were periodically available to stream exclusively on Nintendo Video. The series follows Link throughout various scenarios of the game. The episodes were later made available to stream on the Play Nintendo YouTube channel. (In 2D)
Wildheart Riukiu	Comedy	BONUS.CO.JP	No	4	A series of stop-motion shorts, Wildheart Riukiu incorporates 16-bit graphics with some not-so-charming, but hilarious, characters.
Pikmin Safari	Mockumentary	Nintendo	No	3	A series of shorts created in Pikmin 3, released exclusively for Nintendo Video. They are spoofs on nature documentaries. In them, the explorer, identified as Winston Chumling, follows Alph and his crew, with a cameraman recording, while they all explore and interact with the environment and creatures on PNF-404. The episodes were later made available to stream on the Play Nintendo YouTube channel. (In 2D)
Tomodachi Life: Lessons from Space	Tutorial	Nintendo	No	8	A live-action series starring two aliens, Captain Noobar and Science Officer Pookin, who had come to take over Earth, but they used Tomodachi Life as a source for what humans do on Earth. (In 2D)
How to Win at Super Smash Bros.	Tutorial	Nintendo	No	10	A series of comedic, machinima-style short films produced by Nintendo created in Super Smash Bros. for Nintendo 3DS, with the final two episodes being created in Super Smash Bros. for Wii U, released exclusively for Nintendo Video. The videos were meant to teach viewers the game's basic mechanics in humorous ways. Ten episodes were produced and released in total, with each episode being initially released on Nintendo Video periodically. The episodes were later made available to stream on the Play Nintendo YouTube channel and were made available to watch on the Nintendo 3DS eShop after the discontinuation of Nintendo Video, until the eShop itself was shut down on March 27, 2023. (In 2D)
Zelda Termina Tour	Tutorial	Nintendo	No	5	A series of short tutorial videos hosted by Eiji Aonuma introducing viewers to the world of Termina in The Legend of Zelda: Majora's Mask 3D.
3D FuraFura City Walk Kyoto		NHK Enterprises	No	?	A 3D remastered version of NHK BS Premium's "Kyoto FuraFura." Only released in Japan
3D World Fureai City Walk		NHK Enterprises	No	?	A 3D remastered version of NHK BS Premium's "Sekai Fureai Machi Aruki."
Tokyo Girls Collection		NHK Enterprises	No	?	Only released in Japan
Nikkan Tobidasu		Fuji Television	No	?	Re-broadcast of content previously streamed on "Itsu no Ma ni Terebi." Only released in Japan
Tobidasu Z		Fuji Television	No	?	The successor to "Nikkan Tobidasu." Only released in Japan
Yoshimoto Nintendo 3DS Experimental Theater			No	?	Experiments by Yoshimoto comedians. Only released in Japan
Tondemo! Science			No	?	A 3DS special edition of the program previously streamed on Wii no Ma. Sometimes aired earlier than Wii no Ma. Only released in Japan
The Legend of Zelda: Skyward Sword Orchestra Performance			No	?	
Delicious 3D			No	?	Featuring famous chefs introducing dishes and recipes. Only released in Japan
Revisit That Game			No	?	Retro games (distributed via Virtual Console), with quizzes and strategies called "certification." Only released in Japan (In 2D)
Excavator Mugen Gears			No	?	An anime introducing "Excavator Mugen Gears." Only released in Japan (In 2D)

=== Music videos ===
Title	Artist/group	Ref(s)
"The Fighter"	Gym Class Heroes	
"So Good"	B.o.B.	
"Shake Ya Boogie"	Mocean Worker	
"Burn it Down"	Linkin Park	
"White Knuckles" (Note: The 3D version of the "White Knuckles" music video was made available again for a period of time via the North American Nintendo eShop. It has since been removed.)	OK Go	
"All Is Not Lost"	OK Go	
"Skyscrapers"	OK Go	
"Breakn' a Sweat"	Skrillex ft. The Doors	
"Monster Man"	Devo	
"Save World, Get Girl"	I Fight Dragons	
"Windows Down"	Big Time Rush	
"It Girl"	Jason Derulo	
"Not Your Fault"	Awolnation	
"The Rifle's Spiral"	The Shins	
"Don't Stop (Color on the Walls)"	Foster the People	
"Gang of Rhythm"	Walk off the Earth	
"Kill Your Heroes"	Awolnation	
"Wicked World"	Osaka Popstar	
"Insects"	Osaka Popstar	
"Drown in the Now"	The Crystal Method	

=== Movie trailers ===
Movie	Year	Ref(s)
"Captain America: The First Avenger"	2011	
"The Smurfs"	2011	
"Glee 3D"	2011	
"Puss in Boots"	2011	
"A Very Harold & Kumar 3D Christmas"	2011	
"Happy Feet Two"	2011	
"Arthur Christmas"	2011	
"Underworld: Awakening"	2011	
"Star Wars: Episode I – The Phantom Menace"	2011	
"Ghost Rider: Spirit of Vengeance"	2012	
"Men in Black 3"	2012	
"Prometheus"	2012	
"Madagascar 3"	2012	
"The Amazing Spider-Man"	2012	
"Life of Pi"	2012	
"The Hobbit: An Unexpected Journey"	2012	

In the unaired pilot for Nintendo Show 3D, host Jessie Cantrell mentioned trailers for movies planned to come to Nintendo Video at the time. These included Rio, Thor, Cars 2, and Green Lantern. However, none of these movies' trailers ever appeared on the service.

== Discontinuation ==
On February 27, 2014, Nintendo Australia announced the service would be terminated in the Oceanian region (Australia and New Zealand) as of March 31, 2014. Nintendo of Europe also announced on the same day that they would be terminating the Nintendo Video service on the same date. Nintendo also announced the end of service on that date, ending it on March 31, 2014, as well.

On June 5, 2015, Nintendo of America sent out a SpotPass notification to all of the app's active users informing them that the app was being phased out in favor of an eponymous category on the Nintendo eShop's main page (already available at the time), where users could watch most past videos as well as future ones. Since June 29, 2015, the app is no longer functional and videos can no longer be downloaded. In addition to adding videos on the eShop, a few months after the My Nintendo service launched, videos for permanent download became a common reward that could be bought with Platinum points. Videos would commonly make returns due to popularity or stay longer due to positive fan reception.

The remaining Nintendo Video content and other video on demand content under the Nintendo Video category became permanently unavailable for viewing or download when the Nintendo eShop closed on March 27, 2023. Despite the closure, these can still be redownloaded, however, provided that the user has downloaded the content prior to the shop's closure. Most of the content initially released for the service have also been distributed through other means over time, such as being officially uploaded online or included in home media releases, albeit without the stereoscopic 3D effect.

Some of the videos that were shared through Nintendo video have not been recovered and are now presumed to be lost. Some examples of these include Red Bull BC One and BearShark: Ghost Videos. On June 1, 2025, one of the service's lost shows, Threediots, was uploaded to the Internet Archive.

== See also ==
- Game Boy Advance Video
- Nintendo Channel
- Wii no Ma
