= Powerless (Say What You Want) =

2003 single by Nelly Furtado

Single by Nelly Furtado

from the album Folklore
- Released: 6 October 2003
- Studio: The Gymnasium (Santa Monica, California); Metalworks (Mississauga, Canada)
- Length: 3:53
- Label: DreamWorks
- Songwriters: Nelly Furtado; Gerald Eaton; Brian West; Trevor Horn; Anne Dudley; Malcolm McLaren
- Producers: Track & Field; Nelly Furtado

Nelly Furtado singles chronology
"Fotografía" (2003)	"Powerless (Say What You Want)" (2003)	"Try" (2004)

Music video
- "Powerless (Say What You Want)" on YouTube

"Powerless (Say What You Want)" is a song by Canadian singer-songwriter Nelly Furtado from her second studio album, Folklore (2003). The song was written and produced by Furtado, Gerald Eaton, and Brian West. It contains a sample of The Real Roxanne's "Bang Zoom (Let's Go-Go)" which in turn samples Malcolm McLaren's "Buffalo Gals", written by Trevor Horn, Anne Dudley, and McLaren. The song was released as the album's lead single in October 2003.

== Background ==
"Powerless (Say What You Want)" addresses how Furtado was discriminated against as her record company wanted to hide her ancestry: "Paint my face in your magazines/Make it look whiter than it seems/Paint me over with your dreams/Shove away my ethnicity". According to Furtado, "I noticed that when I turned on the TV, I didn't really see anybody that looked like me. So it's really important for me to keep that realness in me and always remember where I came from, while at the same time always entertaining people. I like music to be inclusive." Furtado also commented on gaining strength through the things that are truly important, saying that "real power comes from not caring about power and just letting yourself be free" and affirming that it is "good to have balance in life".

Of the instrumentation, Furtado said: "I get to see a lot of DJ-oriented performance stuff, and I'm into the heaviness of breakbeats, how raw and powerful they are. Everything lately has become so synthesized, but just the standard sound of breakbeats is inspiring. 'Powerless' uses breakbeats like that; it's a real groove, a real vibe. It just carries you away. There’s a banjo mixed with a breakbeat from elements of Malcolm McLaren's 'Buffalo Gals.' So right away you're bobbing your head. The lyrics are initially in-your-face, like, 'Okay, I know I'm going to be stereotyped in my life because that is the world we live in; that's society.' But the song tries to find some sense of order in this complicated world."

The song was named 'Single of the Year' at the 2004 Juno Awards.

== Music video ==
The music video was directed by Bryan Barber and was shot over three days. The video revolves around a classic psychological metaphor: Furtado trapped inside a box from which she seeks to escape. Inside, the box is plastered with posters that act as doors or windows for the artist's imagination. Her situation is a metaphor for being both defined and confined by the illusory commercial reality of her celebrity and beauty. The video was shot on various sets and dressed locations, and in a large customized box crate, which were all created by production designer Aaron Goffman. Using Photoshop and Illustrator, Moneyshots designed the posters and graphics that surround Furtado in the box and added the transitions that transport her back and forth between the imprisoning box and the poster environments that signify the escape that self-expression can bring.

There is an alternate version of the video featuring Furtado in a field, and shown in several screens in different parts of a city, showing the movements of the modern life.

== Track listing ==
UK CD maxi-single

1. "Powerless (Say What You Want)" (album version) – 3:53
2. "Powerless (Say What You Want)" (JoSH Desi remix) – 3:12
3. "Powerless (Say What You Want)" (alternative acoustic mix) – 3:47

European 2-track CD single

1. "Powerless (Say What You Want)" (album version) – 3:53
2. "Powerless (Say What You Want)" (alternative acoustic mix) – 3:47

European CD maxi-single

1. "Powerless (Say What You Want)" (album version) – 3:53
2. "Powerless (Say What You Want)" (alternative acoustic mix) – 3:47
3. "Powerless (Say What You Want)" (JoSH Desi remix) – 3:47
4. "Powerless (Say What You Want)" (instrumental) – 3:53

== Credits and personnel ==
Credits are lifted from the Folklore album booklet.

Studios

- Recorded at The Gymnasium (Santa Monica, California) and Metalworks Studios (Mississauga, Canada)
- Mastered at Bernie Grundman Mastering (Hollywood, California)

Personnel

- Nelly Furtado – writing, lead and background vocals, production
- Gerald Eaton – writing
- Brian West – writing, engineering
- Trevor Horn – writing ("Buffalo Gals")
- Anne Dudley – writing ("Buffalo Gals")
- Malcolm McLaren – writing ("Buffalo Gals")
- Track & Field – production, programming
  - Track – flange guitar, electric harmonium (left-hand)
  - Field – electric harmonium (right-hand)
- James Bryan – acoustic guitar
- Steve Carnelli – banjo, mandolin
- Mike Elizondo – Echoplex slide guitar
- Brad Haehnel – mixing, engineering
- Joe Labatto – engineering
- Steve Chahley – engineering assistance
- Ian Bodzasi – engineering assistance
- Brian "Big Bass" Gardner – mastering

== Charts ==
=== Weekly charts ===
Weekly chart performance for "Powerless (Say What You Want)"
Chart (2003–2004)	Peak position
Australia (ARIA)	37
Austria (Ö3 Austria Top 40)	7
Belgium (Ultratip Bubbling Under Flanders)	2
Belgium (Ultratip Bubbling Under Wallonia)	7
Canada CHR (Nielsen BDS)	2
CIS Airplay (TopHit)	95
Germany (GfK)	8
Ireland (IRMA)	36
Italy (FIMI)	26
Netherlands (Dutch Top 40)	5
Netherlands (Single Top 100)	6
New Zealand (Recorded Music NZ)	16
Romania (Romanian Top 100)	16
Russia Airplay (TopHit)	82
Scottish Singles Sales (Official Charts)	12
Sweden (Sverigetopplistan)	37
Switzerland (Schweizer Hitparade)	16
UK Singles (Official Charts)	13
US Bubbling Under Hot 100 (Billboard)	9
US Adult Pop Airplay (Billboard)	16
US Dance Club Songs (Billboard)	5
US Pop Airplay (Billboard)	30

=== Year-end charts ===
2003 year-end chart performance for "Powerless (Say What You Want)"
Chart (2003)	Position
CIS Airplay (TopHit)	137
Russia Airplay (TopHit)	137
US Adult Top 40 (Billboard)	87

2004 year-end chart performance for "Powerless (Say What You Want)"
Chart (2004)	Position
Austria (Ö3 Austria Top 40)	28
Germany (Media Control GfK)	28
Netherlands (Dutch Top 40)	18
Netherlands (Single Top 100)	32
Switzerland (Schweizer Hitparade)	78
US Adult Top 40 (Billboard)	69

== Certifications ==
Certifications for "Powerless (Say What You Want)"
Region	Certification	Certified units/sales
Germany (BVMI)	Gold	150,000^{‡}
^{‡} Sales+streaming figures based on certification alone.

== Release history ==
Release dates and formats for "Powerless (Say What You Want)"
Region	Date	Format(s)	Label(s)	Ref.
United States	6 October 2003	Contemporary hit radio; hot AC radio	DreamWorks	
Canada	21 November 2003	CD	DreamWorks	
Australia	24 November 2003	CD	DreamWorks	
United Kingdom	8 December 2003	CD	DreamWorks	
Germany	15 December 2003	CD	Universal; Motor Music	
Japan	21 January 2004	CD	Universal Music Japan	
United Kingdom	21 January 2004	Digital download	DreamWorks	
Germany	2 February 2004	CD	Universal; Motor Music	
