= Back from Earth =

EP by Awolnation
- Released: May 18, 2010
- Recorded: Red Bull recording studio
- Genre: Electronic rock; alternative rock
- Length: 17:58
- Label: Red Bull
- Producer: Aaron Bruno

Awolnation chronology
Back from Earth (2010)	Megalithic Symphony (2011)

Singles from Back from Earth
- 1. "Burn It Down" Released: April 20, 2010; 2. "Guilty Filthy Soul" Released: June 15, 2010

Professional ratings
Review scores
Source	Rating
Consequence of Sound	C–

Back from Earth is the debut EP by American rock band Awolnation. It was released digitally by Red Bull Records on May 18, 2010 for iTunes. "Sail", "Burn It Down" and "Guilty Filthy Soul" appear on Megalithic Symphony, the band's debut album. The EP also features a dubstep remix for "Burn It Down" by Innerpartysystem, which appears on the deluxe version of the album along with "MF".

== Track listing ==
No.	Title	Length
1.	"Burn It Down"	2:45
2.	"Guilty Filthy Soul"	3:34
3.	"Sail"	4:24
4.	"MF"	3:19
5.	"Burn It Down (Innerpartysystem Remix)"	4:56
