= Sail (song) =

Single by Awolnation

from the album Megalithic Symphony
- Released: November 8, 2010
- Recorded: 2010
- Studio: Red Bull (Los Angeles)
- Genre: Electronic rock; alternative rock; industrial rock; electropop
- Length: 4:19 (album version); 3:56 (radio edit)
- Label: Red Bull
- Songwriter: Aaron Bruno
- Producer: Aaron Bruno

Awolnation singles chronology
| "Burn It Down" (2010) | "Sail" (2010) | "Not Your Fault" (2011) |

Music video
- "Sail" on YouTube

"Sail" is a song by the American rock band Awolnation. It was released as a single on November 8, 2010, first featured on the band's debut extended play, Back from Earth (2010), and later on their debut album, Megalithic Symphony (2011). The song was written and produced in Venice, Los Angeles, California by group member Aaron Bruno, with Kenny Carkeet as audio engineer.

"Sail" is the band's most commercially successful song to date, debuting at number 89 on the United States Billboard Hot 100 chart in September 2011 and spending 20 weeks there before dropping out. The single re-entered the Hot 100 a year later, becoming a massive sleeper hit and reaching a new peak of number 17. "Sail" is the first song to climb to its peak after a year on the Hot 100. It spent the sixth-longest amount of time on the Billboard Hot 100 chart with 79 weeks, behind Teddy Swims' "Lose Control" (112 weeks), Glass Animals' "Heat Waves" and (91 weeks), The Weeknd's "Blinding Lights" (90 weeks), Benson Boone's "Beautiful Things" (89 weeks) and Imagine Dragons' "Radioactive" (87 weeks). As of May 2024, the song has accumulated more than 810 million streams on Spotify.

== Background ==
"Sail" is an electronic rock and alternative rock song featuring "industrial-tinged electropop". While band frontman Aaron Bruno, has never spoken directly about the meaning of "Sail", he hinted at it in a 2016 interview, contemplating that people might want a darker twist to the songs on the radio at the time, remembering "playing the song for a producer friend . . . , and he told me everything was great, but I needed a chorus." Bruno attempted to write the chorus, failing to achieve what he thought the song needed. The song's synth-bass section was created on the ATC-1 Tone Chameleon, an external rackmount synthesizer used to recreate classic synth sounds like the Minimoog.

== Music video and controversy ==
"Sail" opens with lead singer Aaron Bruno running to a house and shutting the blinds, relieved to have escaped from the threat outside. Bruno finds a tape recorder, which he starts singing into. He enters a bathroom and looks into a mirror, still singing. A green strip of light enters the house and scans across it, revealing a spacesuit helmet and a military flight-suit. As the light climbs up the stairs towards him, Bruno hides inside a full bathtub, but the beam scans him anyway.

Bruno is pulled across the floor by an unknown force. While attempting to cling to a door-frame, he loses his grip. The scene is interspersed with shots of Bruno closing a door and playing the song's piano section. As the song's final chorus section begins, the house shakes, lights and lamps flicker, and gusts of wind blow. Bruno is pulled by a mysterious force outside the house, and is subsequently levitated into the sky as a set of floodlights flashes on him. He drops the tape recorder.

On October 3, 2011, years before the official video was released in 2014, YouTuber Nanalew uploaded an unofficial video that has since reached over 400 million views and has always been more popular than the official video. After the release of the official video, it was blocked from YouTube due to copyright issues, was returned later, but in March of 2015 Nanalew made the video private herself, posting on her Facebook page that "for the last few years Red Bull Records has been claiming all the earnings for the video. They'd agreed to work with me on a mutually beneficial partnership (including possible compensation for my video), but nothing has come through." The unofficial music video is back on Nanalew's channel and the description has been revised.

== Commercial performance ==
In July 2010, Austin, Texas, DJ Toby Ryan premiered the song on KROX-FM, with a positive response from listeners.

"Sail" debuted at number 89 on the United States Billboard Hot 100 singles chart on September 3, 2011. The single spent 20 weeks on the chart before dropping out on January 14, 2012. In mid-2013, its use in various television shows and advertisements exposed the song to a wider audience, and it re-entered the charts. Following its promotional use in a History Channel trailer promoting Vikings, weekly downloads "more than tripled". The song then peaked at number 17 on the Billboard Hot 100 in its fifty-sixth week on the chart, two years after its initial debut. "Sail" was certified diamond by the Recording Industry Association of America in June 2021, and as of May 2017, it has sold over 6.1 million copies in the US.

"Sail" peaked at number five on the Billboard Alternative songs chart in 2011. The song was featured in the introduction of the 2012 film Disconnect. Due to its extremely unusual longevity, it has become the only song in the history of the Hot 100 to spend a year on the chart without entering the top 20 first.

In Australia and New Zealand, the song peaked in September 2013, reaching number 27 on the Australian Music Chart and number 33 on the New Zealand Music Chart. In the United Kingdom, the song peaked at number 17 on the UK Singles Chart in January 2014.

In an interview in late 2016, Bruno said that for a while, "He felt like he didn't deserve [the fact Sail sold so many copies]." He concluded that "at a certain point, you realize 'well I did write the song', and I've become used to it to a certain degree, but more than anything I feel like sort of a messenger of some greater methods that was meant to be heard by people in general."

== Covers, remixes and media appearances ==
=== Online ===
"Sail" was used as the soundtrack for extreme athlete Jeb Corliss' proximity wingsuit flying video, "Grinding the Crack", uploaded to YouTube in August 2011, which went viral and received over 30 million views.

=== Movies ===
"Sail" was featured in the 2012 film Disconnect, the 2012 horror film Playback, the 2014 sports drama film When the Game Stands Tall, the 2016 horror film Incarnate, and the 2019 romantic-comedy Always Be My Maybe.

=== TV ===
- In 2013, the song was used by the TV channel History in a trailer for the show Vikings and in the trailer for The Counselor (2013).
- "Sail" was featured in "Whiskey Tango Foxtrot", the ninth episode of the third season of The Good Wife.
- A So You Think You Can Dance contestant danced to it in May 2012.
- "Sail" was featured in "The Walking Dead", the 22nd episode of season four of The Vampire Diaries.
- "Sail" was featured during the intro of "Episode #1.2", the second episode of season one of Fleabag.
- In 2011, the song was used by the TV channel Fox in a trailer for season 8 of the show House, M.D..
- “Sail” was featured in season 4, episode 18 (Hot for Teacher) of Pretty Little Liars during a montage scene of Spencer researching Ezra

=== Adverts ===
- A BMW advert that aired during the 2012 Summer Olympics incorporated "Sail".
- The song was featured in a advert by A1 Telekom Austria in 2015 and 2016.

== Formats and track listings ==
- Digital download (United States)
1. "Sail" – 4:19
2. "Sail" (Innerpartysystem Remix) – 5:26
3. "Sail" (Dan the Automator Remix) – 4:34
4. "Sail" (Unlimited Gravity Remix) – 5:49

== Personnel ==
Sourced from the original album liner notes.

Awolnation

- Aaron Bruno - lead and backing vocals, synthesizers, piano, bass guitar, drums, string arrangement
- Christopher Thorn - electric guitar

Additional musicians

- Billy Mohler - bass guitar
- Brad Smith - whistling

== Charts ==
=== Weekly charts ===
Weekly chart performance
| Chart (2010–2015) | Peak position |
|---|---|
| Australia (ARIA) | 27 |
| Austria (Ö3 Austria Top 40) | 4 |
| Belgium (Ultratip Bubbling Under Flanders) | 25 |
| Belgium (Ultratip Bubbling Under Wallonia) | 20 |
| Canada Hot 100 (Billboard) | 48 |
| Canada CHR/Top 40 (Billboard) | 48 |
| Canada Rock (Billboard) | 11 |
| Czech Republic Singles Digital (ČNS IFPI) | 37 |
| Denmark (Tracklisten) | 21 |
| France (SNEP) | 48 |
| Germany (Media Control AG) | 58 |
| Ireland (IRMA) | 56 |
| Netherlands (Single Top 100) | 59 |
| New Zealand (Recorded Music NZ) | 33 |
| Portugal Digital Songs (Billboard) | 2 |
| Poland Airplay (ZPAV) | 10 |
| Scottish Singles Sales (Official Charts) | 20 |
| Slovakia Singles Digital (ČNS IFPI) | 48 |
| Sweden (Sverigetopplistan) | 32 |
| Switzerland (Schweizer Hitparade) | 35 |
| UK Singles (Official Charts) | 17 |
| UK Indie (Official Charts) | 1 |
| US Billboard Hot 100 | 17 |
| US Adult Pop Airplay (Billboard) | 31 |
| US Hot Rock & Alternative Songs (Billboard) | 4 |
| US Pop Airplay (Billboard) | 17 |

=== Year-end charts ===
Annual chart rankings
| Chart (2011) | Position |
|---|---|
| US Hot Rock Songs (Billboard) | 20 |
| Chart (2012) | Position |
| Sweden (Sverigetopplistan) | 49 |
| US On-Demand Songs (Billboard) | 26 |
| Chart (2013) | Position |
| Australia Streaming (ARIA) | 47 |
| Sweden (Sverigetopplistan) | 86 |
| UK Singles (Official Charts Company) | 127 |
| US Billboard Hot 100 | 25 |
| US Hot Rock Songs (Billboard) | 5 |
| Chart (2014) | Position |
| France (SNEP) | 118 |
| US Hot Rock Songs (Billboard) | 14 |
| Chart (2015) | Position |
| Austria (Ö3 Austria Top 40) | 73 |

=== Decade-end charts ===
| Chart (2010–2019) | Position |
|---|---|
| US Hot Rock Songs (Billboard) | 14 |

== Certifications ==
| Region | Certification | Certified units/sales |
|---|---|---|
| Australia (ARIA) | Platinum | 70,000^{^} |
| Austria (IFPI Austria) | Gold | 15,000^{*} |
| Canada (Music Canada) | Diamond | 800,000^{‡} |
| Italy (FIMI) | Platinum | 30,000^{‡} |
| New Zealand (RMNZ) | 5× Platinum | 150,000^{‡} |
| Norway (IFPI Norway) | Gold | 5,000^{*} |
| Spain (Promusicae) | Gold | 30,000^{‡} |
| Sweden (GLF) | 3× Platinum | 120,000^{‡} |
| Switzerland (IFPI Switzerland) | Gold | 15,000^{^} |
| United Kingdom (BPI) | 2× Platinum | 1,200,000^{‡} |
| United States (RIAA) | Diamond | 10,000,000^{‡} / 6,126,000 |
Streaming
| Denmark (IFPI Danmark) | Platinum | 1,800,000^{†} |
| Norway (IFPI Norway) | 2× Platinum | 6,000,000^{†} |
^{*} Sales figures based on certification alone.^{^} Shipments figures based on certification alone.^{‡} Sales+streaming figures based on certification alone.^{†} Streaming-only figures based on certification alone.

== Release history ==
| Country | Date | Format | Label |
|---|---|---|---|
| United States | January 4, 2011 | Alternative radio | Red Bull |
| United States | June 6, 2011 | Active rock radio | Red Bull |
| United States | June 13, 2011 | Digital download | Red Bull |
| Germany | September 23, 2011 | Digital download | Red Bull |
| United Kingdom | September 25, 2011 | Digital download | Red Bull |
| France | September 26, 2011 | Digital download | Red Bull |
| Spain | September 27, 2011 | Digital download | Red Bull |
| United States | October 29, 2012 | Hot AC radio | Red Bull |
| United States | October 29, 2012 | Contemporary hit radio | Red Bull |
