= Brian West (music producer) =

Canadian record producer and songwriter

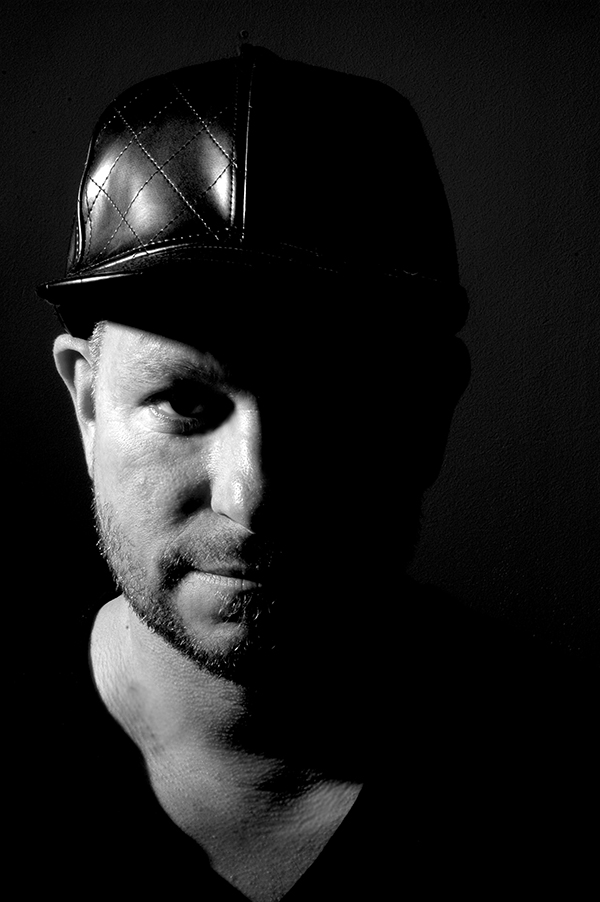

Background information
- Also known as: Sweet Westy, Field from Track & Field
- Born: March 12, 1971 (age 55); Sarnia, Ontario, Canada
- Origin: Toronto, Ontario, Canada
- Genres: Pop; rock; hip hop
- Occupations: Record producer; songwriter; musician
- Instruments: Guitar; piano
- Years active: 1994–present
- Website: sweetwesty.com

Brian West (born March 12, 1971) is a Canadian record producer, songwriter, and musician. Formerly of the production team Track and Field, he is best known for his work with Nelly Furtado, Maroon 5, Awolnation, K'naan, and Bono. He co-produced Andy Grammer's single "Honey, I'm Good" with Steve Greenberg and Nolan Sipe. His most recent release, "Salted Wound," sung by Sia, is on the Fifty Shades of Grey soundtrack. West has been nominated for an Academy Award, two Grammy Awards and has won seven Juno Awards. West is a guitarist for the Canadian band The Philosopher Kings.

== Life and career ==
West began his career as the lead guitarist for Toronto-based band The Philosopher Kings in 1994. After achieving some commercial success in the late 1990s and winning a Canadian Juno Award with the group, he began to produce music for other artists, partnering up with Kings lead singer Gerald Eaton to produce Nelly Furtado's debut album, Whoa, Nelly! The project garnered a Grammy nomination for West's production and a win for Furtado, as well as several Juno Awards. Working as a production duo under the name Track and Field, together West and Eaton co-wrote and co-produced Furtado's follow-up album Folklore and two albums with Somali Canadian rapper K'Naan, landing themselves several more Junos. Before long, West branched off into solo production, now producing and writing alongside such notable artists as Maroon 5, Awolnation, K'Naan, Nakia, and Bono.

His work has been featured on soundtracks for a number of films, including Fifty Shades of Grey, The Mortal Instruments: City of Bones, 20 Feet from Stardom, The Italian Job, Harold and Kumar Escape from Guantanamo Bay, and Brokedown Palace, among others.

== Selected discography ==
Year	Artist	Album	Details	Label
2013	Bryan Ellis	The Mortal Instruments: City of Bones soundtrack; forthcoming album	Producer, writer, engineer, musician ("Strange Days" on film soundtrack; "Days of the Summer")	Universal Republic
2013	Nakia	Drown In The Crimson Tide	Producer, writer, musician ("Walking On A Slant")	Something Music
2013	Judith Hill	20 Feet from Stardom soundtrack	Producer, writer, engineer, musician ("Desperation")	Columbia Records
2012	Maroon 5	Overexposed	Producer, writer, musician ("Man Who Never Lied")	A&M/Octone
2012	Judith Hill	Spike Lee's Red Hook Summer soundtrack	Producer, writer, engineer, musician ("Desperation")	40 Acres and a Mule Musicworks
2012	K'Naan	Country, God or the Girl	Producer, writer, engineer, musician ("Bulletproof Pride" featuring Bono, "Simple," "70 Excuses")	A&M/Octone
2011	Paper Tongues	Paper Tongues	Producer, writer, engineer, musician ("Ride To California," "Trinity," "Get Higher," "For the People," "Love Like You")	A&M/Octone
2011	Marlon Roudette	Matter Fixed	Producer, writer, engineer, musician ("Storyline")	Universal Germany
2011	Alysha Brillinger	Forthcoming album	Producer, writer, engineer, musician ("Better Soon," "Boy Ho," "Sorry")	Lava/Universal
2011	He Met Her	Forthcoming album	Producer, writer, engineer, musician ("Be Ok," "Moon Cafe")	
2011	Awolnation	Megalithic Symphony	Producer, writer, engineer, musician ("Kill Your Heroes")	Red Bull Records
2011	Darren Hayes (singer of Savage Garden)	Secret Codes and Battleships	Producer, writer, engineer, musician ("Cruel Cruel World," "Explode," "Tiny Little Flashlights")	
2010	Bonnie Pink	Dear Diary	Producer, engineer, musician ("World Peace")	Warner Music Japan
2009	Nelly Furtado	Mi Plan	Producer ("Sueños" featuring Alejandro Fernández)	Universal Music Latino
2009	K'Naan	Troubadour	Producer, writer, engineer, musician (11 tracks)	A&M/Octone
2009	Bonnie Pink	One	Producer, engineer, musician ("Mo-So-Lover," "Play and Pause," "Get on the Bus")	Warner Music Japan
2006	Stacie Orrico	Beautiful Awakening	Producer, writer, engineer, musician ("Beautiful Awakening)	Virgin Records
2006	Philosopher Kings	Castles	Member, writer, musician, producer, engineer (14 tracks)	Sony BMG Canada
2005	K'Naan	The Dusty Foot Philosopher	Producer, writer, engineer, musician (10 tracks)	Sony BMG
2005	Esthero	Wikked Lil' Grrrls	Producer, writer, engineer, musician ("O.G. Bitch," "Junglebook" featuring Andre 3000)	Reprise/WEA
2004	Various Artists	Perfecto Chills Vol. 2	Producer, writer, remixer ("Try" by Nelly Furtado featuring the Kronus Quartet)	Thrive Records
2003	Nelly Furtado	Folklore	Producer, writer, engineer, musician (10 tracks)	DreamWorks
2003	Kazzer	The Italian Job soundtrack	Writer ("Pedal to the Medal")	Paramount Pictures
2000	Nelly Furtado	Whoa, Nelly!	Producer, writer, engineer, musician (11 tracks, including "I'm Like a Bird" and "Turn Off the Light")	DreamWorks
1997	Philosopher Kings	Famous, Rich and Beautiful	Member, musician, writer (13 tracks)	Sony BMG Canada
1994	Philosopher Kings	Philosopher Kings	Member, musician, writer (12 tracks)	Sony BMG Canada

== Awards and nominations ==
Grammy Awards

- 2013 – Best Pop Vocal Album (Maroon 5, Overexposed): Nominated
- 2002 – Producer of the Year, Non-Classical: Nominated

Latin Grammy Awards

- 2010 – Best Female Pop Vocal Album (Nelly Furtado, Mi Plan): Won

Juno Awards

- 2010 – Artist of the Year (K'Naan): Won
- 2006 – Rap Recording of the Year (K'Naan, The Dusty Foot Philosopher): Won
- 2004 – Single of the Year (Nelly Furtado, "Powerless (Say What You Want)"): Won
- 2001 – Best Producer: Won
- 2001 – Best Single (Nelly Furtado, "I'm Like a Bird"): Won
- 2001 – Best New Solo Artist (Nelly Furtado): Won
- 1996 – Best New Group (The Philosopher Kings): Won

SOCAN Awards

- 2010 – SOCAN Award for No. 1 song (K'Naan, "Take a Minute"): Won
