= Jarvis Church =

Gerald Eaton
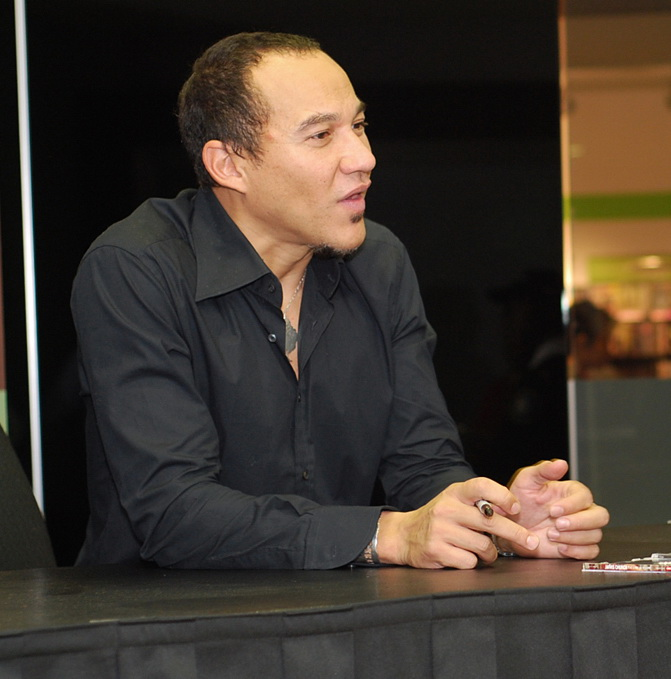
- Eaton at an autograph session in 2009

Background information
- Also known as: Jarvis Church
- Born: Spanish Town, Jamaica
- Genres: R&B, pop
- Occupations: Musician, producer
- Instrument: Vocals
- Years active: 1993–present
- Label: G.E.M./Universal
- Website: http://www.jarvischurch.ca

Gerald Eaton (born November 22, 1971) is a Jamaican-Canadian R&B singer, songwriter and music producer, also known by his stage name Jarvis Church.

== Career ==
Eaton is the lead singer for the R&B-pop group the Philosopher Kings, which reached its peak popularity in the 1990s. During the group's ten-year hiatus, Eaton began a solo career, releasing the album Shake It Off in 2002 under the stage name Jarvis Church, derived from two parallel streets in Toronto, Ontario. The Philosopher Kings subsequently reunited and released a new album in February 2006. In 2008, he released his second solo album called The Long Way Home. In 2012, he released his third solo album The Soul Station Vol 1: The Songs of Sam Cooke, A Tribute, and in 2015, continued with his second in a series of albums spotlighting the music of soul singers called The Soul Station Vol 2: The Songs of Curtis Mayfield, A Tribute.

As a producer, in 1999 he discovered Nelly Furtado at the Honey Jam showcase in Toronto, Ontario, Canada and in 2001 he co-produced Furtado's debut album Whoa, Nelly! with his Philosopher Kings bandmate Brian West. In 2001, they were nominated for the producer of the year Grammy. Their production team is known as Track and Field, and they also appear on the production credits of Esthero's album Wikked Lil' Grrrls. Track and Field also produced Canadian rapper K'naan's albums The Dusty Foot Philosopher and Troubadour, and the title track from Stacie Orrico's 2006 album Beautiful Awakening. He appeared on the song "Saturdays" by Nelly Furtado on the album Folklore.

He scored the music for and appeared on the television series Da Kink in My Hair in 2007.

== Awards and honors ==
- 1995 Juno award for best new group. The Philosopher Kings.
- 1996 Socan award for best urban music. The Philosopher Kings.
- 2001 Grammy nomination for producer of the year for Whoa, Nelly!, Nelly Furtado.
- 2002 Juno for producer of the year for Whoa, Nelly!, Nelly Furtado.
- 2005 Juno for best hip hop album, The Dusty Foot Philosopher, K'naan.
- 2005 Socan award for pop music, "Powerless (Say What You Want)", Folklore, Nelly Furtado.
- 2010 Socan number one award for "Take a Minute", Troubadour, K'naan
- 2024 Grammy Winner - social change song of the year, K’naan

== Discography ==
=== Studio albums ===
- 2002: Shake It Off
- 2008: The Long Way Home
- 2012: The Soul Station Vol. 1 The Songs of Sam Cooke: A Tribute
- 2015: The Soul Station Vol. 2: The Songs of Curtis Mayfield: A Tribute
- 2022: Vol. 3: A Tribute to Bill Withers and Beyond

=== Singles ===
- "Shake It Off"
- "Run for Your Life" (ft. Esthero)
- "Who Will Be Your Man"
- "Whole Day Long"
- "So Beautiful"
- "Lovers Kiss"
- "Just Like That" (ft. Rock Supreme)
