= Te Busqué =

Single by Nelly Furtado featuring Juanes

from the album Loose
- Language: English; Spanish
- B-side: "Runaway"; "Say It Right"; "Lo Bueno Siempre Tiene un Final"; "En Las Manos de Dios"; "Dar"
- Released: July 20, 2007
- Recorded: 2005
- Studio: Orange Lounge (Toronto, Canada); The Hit Factory Criteria (Miami, Florida); Cubejam (Miami)
- Genre: Latin pop
- Length: 3:38
- Label: Geffen; Mosley
- Songwriters: Nelly Furtado; Juanes; Lester Mendez
- Producer: Lester Mendez

Nelly Furtado singles chronology
"Give It to Me" (2007)	"Te Busqué" (2007)	"Do It" (2007)

Juanes singles chronology
"No Siento Penas" (2006)	"Te Busque" (2007)	"Mi Libre Canción" (2006)

Audio video
- "Te Busque" on YouTube

"Te Busqué" is a song recorded by Canadian singer Nelly Furtado for her third studio album Loose (2006). It features guest vocals from Juanes, who co-wrote the song with Furtado and its sole producer Lester Mendez. The song was released as the fifth European single from Loose on July 20, 2007, by Geffen Records and Mosley Music Group.

== Writing and production ==
Furtado originally wrote the song in mid-2005 to a beat that Lester Mendez had created, with the verses in English and the choruses in Spanish. Furtado disliked the chorus and discussed it with Juanes, who had collaborated with Furtado on his single "Fotografía" (2003) and who had played at the Universal Amphitheatre in Los Angeles, where Furtado and Mendez were working. Juanes agreed to co-write a duet with Furtado for the album, and he flew from Mexico to Toronto, Ontario, where they wrote the song in two days. Juanes played electric and acoustic guitar on the track.

The song is a smooth Latin pop ballad, which according to Talia Kraines from BBC Music, "it conjures up imaginations of romantic sunsets." Chuck Taylor from Billboard noted that the song "tap[s] into Furtado's portuguese roots.

== Release and commercial performance ==
Due to the limited success of Furtado's hip hop and R&B-influenced 2006 singles "Promiscuous" and "Maneater" in Spain, "Te Busqué" began receiving airplay in the country, despite not being officially serviced to radio. The heavy rotation prompted the song to reach the summit on the Los 40 Principales chart in Spain. Furthermore, an accompanying music video for "Te Busqué" was scheduled to be filmed in December 2006, which ultimately failed to come to fruition.

In select European countries, "Te Busqué" was released as the fifth single from Loose on July 20, 2007, reaching the top 20 in Germany, the Netherlands and Russia. In the US, "Te Busqué" was not released as a single but received enough airplay on Latin radio stations to reach number 24 on the Billboard Latin Pop Airplay chart.

== Track listings and formats ==
German 2-track CD single

1. "Te Busqué" (album version) (featuring Juanes) – 3:39
2. "Te Busqué" (Spanish version) (featuring Juanes) – 3:38

German CD maxi-single and first digital EP

1. "Te Busqué" (album version) (featuring Juanes) – 3:39
2. "Te Busqué" (Spanish version) (featuring Juanes) – 3:38
3. "Runaway" – 4:19
4. "Say It Right" (Reggae Main Mix) (featuring Courtney John) – 3:59

German second digital EP

1. "Te Busqué" (album version) (featuring Juanes) – 3:39
2. "Te Busqué" (Spanish version) (featuring Juanes) – 3:38
3. "Lo Bueno Siempre Tiene un Final" – 4:24
4. "En Las Manos de Dios" – 4:29
5. "Dar" – 4:40

== Credits and personnel ==
- Nelly Furtado – songwriting, vocals
- Juanes – writing, vocals
- Lester Mendez – writing, producer

== Charts ==
=== Weekly charts ===
Weekly chart performance for "Te Busqué"
Chart (2006–2007)	Peak position
Austria (Ö3 Austria Top 40)	25
CIS (TopHit)	17
Germany (GfK)	16
Netherlands (Dutch Top 40)	4
Netherlands (Single Top 100)	11
Romania (Romanian Top 100)	22
Russia Airplay (TopHit)	14
Spain (Los 40 Principales)	1
Switzerland (Schweizer Hitparade)	79
US Latin Pop Airplay (Billboard)	24

=== Year-end charts ===
2006 year-end chart performance for "Te Busqué"
Chart (2006)	Position
Russia Airplay (TopHit)	183

2007 year-end chart performance for "Te Busqué"
Chart (2007)	Position
CIS (TopHit)	115
Netherlands (Dutch Top 40)	25
Netherlands (Single Top 100)	91
Russia Airplay (TopHit)	158

== Release history ==
Release dates and formats for "Te Busqué"
Region	Date	Format(s)	Label(s)	Ref.
Germany	20 July 2007	CD; digital download (first EP); maxi CD	Universal Music	
Germany	27 July 2007	Digital download (second EP)	Universal Music	
