= Do It (Nelly Furtado song) =

2007 single by Nelly Furtado

Single by Nelly Furtado

from the album Loose
- Released: July 24, 2007
- Recorded: 2006
- Studio: Hit Factory Criteria (Miami)
- Genre: Dance-pop
- Length: 3:41
- Label: Geffen; Mosley
- Songwriters: Nelly Furtado; Tim Mosley; Nate Hills
- Producers: Timbaland; Danja

Nelly Furtado singles chronology
"Te Busqué" (2007)	"Do It" (2007)	"In God's Hands" (2007)

Music video
- "Do It" on YouTube

"Do It" is a song by Canadian singer Nelly Furtado from her third studio album, Loose (2006). It was written by Furtado, Danja, and Timbaland, and was also produced by Danja and Timbaland. The song is strongly influenced by 1980s dance music and features sexually suggestive lyrics, in which the song's protagonist asks a lover to satisfy her sexually.

"Do It" reached the top twenty in Canada and was a number-one dance hit in the United States, where it became Furtado's lowest peaking single on the Billboard Hot 100.

The music video for "Do It" was directed by Aaron A. (the documentarian on Furtado's Get Loose Tour), and co-directed by Furtado. It was shot on location in Detroit. The video was premiered on MuchMusic on July 13, 2007, and on MTV's Total Request Live on August 1, 2007.

== Composition ==
Furtado has credited the influence of 1980s musicians such as Blondie, Madonna, the Police, Prince and Talking Heads on Loose, saying that the album's creative team "were picking up on some of the more surreal, theatrical elements of '80s music, the stuff that puts you in sort of a dream state. There's a mysterious, after-midnight vibe to this album that's extremely visceral. I want people to escape into the music and indulge their most animalistic impulses." Referring to the sexually suggestive lyrics in "Do It" and other songs on Loose, Furtado cited the influence of what she described as "the assertive female sexuality of '90s hip-hop, from Queen Latifah to MC Lyte, Yo-Yo, Salt-N-Pepa, TLC. They were sexy, smart and creative—strong women in control. That's what I like about the sexual content on Loose: It's very organic."

=== Plagiarism controversy ===
The melody, chord progression and other elements were sampled from a cover of the song "Acid Jazzed Evening" by Finnish demoscene artist Janne Suni, which was available as a chiptune-style 4-channel Amiga module file. In 2009, Finnish record label Kernal Records Oy sued Timbaland and Furtado for copyright infringement; the case was dismissed in 2011, with the judge finding that "Acid Jazzed Evening" was first published on the internet and had not been properly copyrighted in the United States.

== Critical reception ==
Billboard magazine said "[it] again demonstrates Furtado's striking versatility [...] Missy Elliott is stripped onto the single version, with a midsection breakdown . . . amusing, but hardly necessary in scoring yet another essential moment from [Loose]". Stylus magazine cited the track and "No Hay Igual" as the album's "undisputed highlights [...] The two songs couldn't possibly be more different, yet the duo [Furtado and Timbaland] manages to convincingly pull off both of them." Slant Magazine said the song is "a deliciously uptempo 80's cut", and The Guardian wrote that Furtado "delivers irresistible hooks of Maneater, Promiscuous and Do It with punchy, playful charisma rather than breathy cooing." Blogcritics published a more negative assessment of the song:

The songs are much more upbeat and not recognizable as the Nelly Furtado that has come to make our ears flutter with her beautiful eclectic sounds. Take for example the song "Do It". What a blast from the '80s past! Here we have a song that would be a huge hit in the '80s thrown in on an album that so desperately wants to score a club hit so that teenagers will download the song as a ringtone. It's a mess. Should we blame Timbaland for the need to clean up aisle 3?

The Village Voice wrote that the song "weakly evokes J.J. Fad" and exemplified why Loose "isn't a love child [between Furtado and Timbaland], but a bump-and-grind that never finds a groove". The Northern Light editorialised, "Although "Do It" fits well after "Say It Right" [the preceding track on the album], there is something very D+ about the song. As cute as it is, it sounds like something that was just better than a filler track." MTV News summarised "Do It" as a "roller-skating jam [that] is all percolating, bubblegum keyboards", and said it contained "one of Timbaland's best beats since he put the snakey whistle on Ludacris' "The Potion"". Kelefa Sanneh of The New York Times wrote of the album and song, "Ms. Furtado and Timbaland love unexpected details, and this secretly meticulous CD is full of them [...] in "Do It", Ms. Furtado mutters a casual "Yeah"; Timbaland samples it and turns it into a rhythm instrument that returns at the end of the song, to reward everyone who's paying attention." Billboard magazine wrote that the song contains "breezy uptempo rhythmic instrumentation alongside a sensual lyric that requests a suitor to deliver the physical goods", and that it is one of the tracks on Loose on which "she extorts Gwen Stefani's '80s vibe and schoolgirl chants". Hope, Clover. Other critics have identified a 1980s influence in the song. Stylus magazine described "Do It" as an "undeniable '80s dance-pop" song on which "she [Furtado] conjures the ghost of Vanity, weaving her wickedly mischievous falsetto through Timbaland's synth splashes." According to The Northern Light, Furtado "sings on a bouncy '80s-style track—complete with the keyboard solo—about something reminiscent of a night of high school romance. The track echoes Gwen Stefani's "Crash", but with less of a dance groove." The Observer said that the song "drops an early Eighties Street Sounds electro-pop motif into some frisky footwork from Timbaland", and Slant Magazine characterised the song as an "'80s uptempo cut that imagines what The Jets would've sounded like if they'd been singing about getting some instead of just having crushes". The website Okayplayer called "Do It" and the Loose tracks "Maneater" and "Glow" "electronic-influenced dance songs" similar to another track, "Promiscuous", with "a club-friendly '80s-influenced synthesizer melody." Sun Media described it as "'80s-era Madonna-reminiscent", and a writer for the blog MTV Buzzworthy said it sounds like "a mash-up of old-school Madonna".

== Music video ==
The music video for "Do It" was co-directed by Furtado and Aaron A, the documentarian on Furtado's Get Loose Tour. The filming took place on location in Detroit, one of the stops on the tour. It begins in a women's restroom, in which dancers on Furtado's tour are getting ready to go out. Furtado emerges and starts singing, and she and the dancers leave the restroom and walk out of the club while Furtado is holding a gnome. During daytime, Furtado's dancers walk down the street to her apartment, walk into her bedroom and wake her up. They get dressed and ready to dance, run down the stairs and tow a car into the studio, where Furtado begins performing choreography with her dancers. The video is intercut with shots of Furtado and her dancers wearing white clothing while singing in feathers.

The video was premiered on MuchMusic on July 13, 2007, and on MTV's Total Request Live on August 1, 2007. It debuted on the TRL top ten countdown on August 9, returned to it on August 27 and reached number one on six days. The video spent seventeen days on the countdown. It also reached number one on VH1's VSpot Top 20 Countdown, Furtado's most successful video on that countdown

== Chart performance ==
The song debuted on the US Billboard Hot 100 at number eighty-eight but dropped off the next week. It peaked at number sixty on the Billboard Pop 100. "Do It" was Furtado's second consecutive single not to reach the top twenty on the Hot 100 or Pop 100 charts, and the lowest peaking single from Loose on both charts; it is also Furtado's lowest charting entry on the Hot 100. It became the fifth consecutive number-one single from Loose on the Billboard Hot Dance Club Play chart. On the Canadian Hot 100, the song debuted at number sixty in early August 2007 and peaked at number eleven.

In Europe, "Do It" reached number twenty-two in Germany, remaining on the singles chart for nine weeks. The single reached the top twenty in the Netherlands and Norway and the top forty in Switzerland and Belgium. It charted outside the top forty in Austria. In the United Kingdom, "Do It" debuted at number ninety-five and peaked on its fourth week of charting at number seventy-five and dropped off the next week.

== Track listings ==
- Digital download
1. "Do It" featuring Missy Elliott – 3:27
- European 2-track CD single
1. "Do It" (Radio Mix) – 3:29
2. "Do It" featuring Missy Elliott – 3:26
- Australian and European CD maxi-single
1. "Do It" (Radio Mix) – 3:29
2. "Do It" featuring Missy Elliott – 3:26
3. "All Good Things (Come to an End)" (Kaskade Remix) – 6:44
4. "Do It" (Video) – 3:33

== Personnel ==
Credits adapted from the Loose liner notes.

- Nelly Furtado – lyrics, background vocals
- Timbaland – producer, drums, keyboards
- Danja – producer, keyboards
- Demacio "Demo" Castellón – additional programming, mixing, recording, engineering
- Marcella "Ms. Lago" Araica – additional recording
- James Roach – second engineer
- Kobla Tetey – second engineer
- Ben Jost – second engineer
- Vadim Chislov – second engineer
- Jim Beanz – vocal production
- Recorded and mixed at The Hit Factory Criteria, Miami, Florida

== Charts ==
=== Weekly charts ===
Weekly chart performance for "Do It" (Note: In Hungary and New Zealand, the remix of "Do It" featuring Missy Elliott charted instead of the original version. In Canada and the US, the versions were combined.)
Chart (2007–2008)	Peak position
Australia (ARIA)	53
Austria (Ö3 Austria Top 40)	45
Belgium (Ultratop 50 Flanders)	35
Belgium (Ultratop 50 Wallonia)	33
Canada Hot 100 (Billboard)	11
Canada AC (Billboard)	40
Canada CHR/Top 40 (Billboard)	4
Canada Hot AC (Billboard)	2
Czech Republic Airplay (ČNS IFPI)	23
European Hot 100 Singles (Billboard)	44
Finland (Suomen virallinen lista)	6
Germany (GfK)	22
Hungary (Rádiós Top 40)	19
Hungary (Dance Top 40)	18
Italy (FIMI)	4
Lithuania (EHR)	2
Netherlands (Dutch Top 40)	16
Netherlands (Single Top 100)	31
New Zealand (Recorded Music NZ)	17
Norway (VG-lista)	18
Romania (Romanian Top 100)	3
Russia Airplay (TopHit)	66
Slovakia Airplay (ČNS IFPI)	3
Switzerland (Schweizer Hitparade)	30
UK Singles (Official Charts)	75
US Billboard Hot 100	88
US Dance Club Songs (Billboard)	1
US Pop Airplay (Billboard)	28

=== Year-end charts ===
2007 year-end chart performance for "Do It"
Chart (2007)	Position
Netherlands (Dutch Top 40)	91
Romania (Romanian Top 100)	47

2008 year-end chart performance for "Do It"
Chart (2008)	Position
Hungary (Rádiós Top 40)	83

== Release history ==
Release dates and formats for "Do It"
Region	Date	Format(s)	Version(s)	Label(s)	Ref.
United States	July 24, 2007	Contemporary hit radio	Remix	Geffen; Mosley	
United States	August 7, 2007	Digital download	Remix	Geffen; Mosley	
United States	August 21, 2007	12-inch vinyl	Original; remix	Geffen; Mosley	
Germany	September 28, 2007	CD; maxi CD	Original; remix	Universal Music	

== See also ==
- List of Billboard Hot Dance Club Play number ones of 2007
