= Give It to Me (Timbaland song) =

2007 song by Timbaland featuring Nelly Furtado and Justin Timberlake

Single by Timbaland featuring Nelly Furtado and Justin Timberlake

from the album Shock Value
- B-side: "Come Around"
- Released: February 6, 2007
- Studio: Thomas Crown (Virginia Beach); Chalice Recording (Los Angeles)
- Genre: Electro; hip-hop
- Length: 3:55
- Label: Mosley; Blackground; Interscope
- Songwriters: Timothy Mosley; Nelly Furtado; Justin Timberlake; Floyd Hills; Timothy Clayton
- Producers: Timbaland; Danja

Timbaland singles chronology
"SexyBack" (2006)	"Give It to Me" (2007)	"Anonymous" (2007)

Nelly Furtado singles chronology
"All Good Things (Come to an End)" (2006)	"Give It to Me" (2007)	"Te Busqué" (2007)

Justin Timberlake singles chronology
"What Goes Around... Comes Around" (2006)	"Give It to Me" (2007)	"Summer Love" (2007)

Music video
- "Give It to Me" on YouTube

"Give It to Me" is a song by American producer Timbaland, released as the first single from his second studio album Shock Value (2007). The song features vocals by Canadian singer Nelly Furtado and American singer Justin Timberlake. All three artists co-wrote the song together with American rapper Attitude and American producer Danja, who co-produced the song with Timbaland. Mosley Music Group, in association with Blackground Records and Interscope Records, serviced the song to contemporary hit and rhythmic radios in the United States on February 6, 2007, and later to urban radios on March 10, 2007. "Give It to Me" is an electro song that embodies the sensibilities of club music. The song features the protagonists addressing their critics about their successes in the music industry.

The song has been noted for the diatribe in Timbaland's verse against American producer Scott Storch, who has worked with the producer in the past. It received positive reviews from music critics, many praising it for its club-oriented sound, Timbaland's production and the lyrics. The song experienced successful commercial outcomes in the United States as well as internationally. "Give It to Me" reached the top position on the Billboard Hot 100, becoming his first and only number one single in the United States as a lead artist (second overall after "Promiscuous"). It has sold nearly two million downloads in the United States. Outside of the United States, "Give It to Me" topped the charts in Canada, Denmark, and the United Kingdom, and peaked within the top ten of the charts in various countries, including Austria, Germany, Ireland, the Netherlands, and Switzerland.

The accompanying music video was directed by Paul Coy Allen and Timbaland. It features footage of the singers performing live at the 2007 Grammy Awards and the singers in their tour bus and on a balcony. The single was nominated for the Grammy Award for Best Pop Collaboration with Vocals at the 2008 Grammy Awards. A mashup of the song and "Dom Dom Yes Yes" by Biser King is used in the web series Skibidi Toilet as the theme song of its titular antagonists.

== Background ==
"Give It to Me" was written by Timbaland, Danja, Attitude, Justin Timberlake and Nelly Furtado. The song was also produced by Timbaland and Danja; the latter performed on the keyboard and bass while the former played the drums. Cuban sound engineer Demacio "Demo" Castellón recorded and programmed the song at Thomas Crown Studios in Virginia Beach, Virginia and Chalice Recording Studios in Los Angeles. Matty Green assisted Castellón in the mixing process for the song, which took place at Thomas Crown Studios in Virginia Beach, Virginia and The Village in Los Angeles. "Give It to Me" is the first single released from Shock Value (2007). Mosley Music Group, in association with Blackground Records and Interscope Records, serviced the song to urban radios on contemporary hit and rhythmic radios on February 6, 2007, in the United States. It was later serviced to urban radios on March 13, 2007, in the United States.

The song was released to the internet in November 2006 in a demo version and it was speculated as a possible single from Timbaland's new studio album. In late January 2007, it was confirmed as the first single from Timbaland's new album, which was confirmed to be released in March. Following the release of the single, a rivalry between Timbaland and record producer Scott Storch began to intensify. In the lyrics, Timbaland anonymously backlashes Storch: "I'm a real producer and you['re] just the piano man". In an interview, Timbaland confirmed that he was talking about Storch. The dispute partly stemmed from controversy regarding writing credits for Justin Timberlake's "Cry Me a River" (2003). Following the reported diss, Storch culminated a response song of his own called "Built Like That", where he addresses Timbaland for stealing credit from Danja and claims to be the true producer of "Cry Me a River".

== Composition ==
"Give It to Me"
A 17-second sample of the chorus of "Give It to Me".

"Give It to Me" is an electro and hip-hop song with club music sensibilities. It features a space-age sound that is built of skeletal synths, percussion, bass, low range horns, breathless drums, and digitized keyboards. Andy Kellman of AllMusic describes it as a "leisurely club track full of swagger". David Hyland of WESH Orlando noted the song as "a mellow, slinky club jam that meshes odd, polyrhythmic drumming, a "Twilight Zone" countermelody and digitized keyboard belches with vocals supplied by Furtado and Timberlake." It begins with a heavy tribal beat and accompanying synths. Furtado begins with rhymes about her change in appearance for her third studio album, with the lines "Love my ass and my abs in the video called 'Promiscuous' / My style is ri-dic-dic-diculous, 'diculous, 'diculous". After the chorus, Timbaland raps about his successes as a producer and songwriter while making disparaging remarks towards an unnamed producer, most notably in the lines "I get a half a mill for my beats, you get a couple gra-an-and/Never gon' see the day that I ain't got the upper hand/I'm respected from Californ-I-A, way down to Japan" and "I'm a real producer and you just a piano man/Your songs don't top the charts, I heard 'em, I'm not a fa-an-an". Timberlake follows after the second chorus with his verse, where he addresses a rival (allegedly Prince) about his chart success with "SexyBack", present in the lines, "If sexy never left, then why's everybody on my shi-i-i-t? / Don't hate on me just because you didn't come up with it".

== Critical reception ==
"Give It to Me" received generally positive reviews from music critics. The song received a four star rating from Bill Lamb of About.com, praising it as an intoxicating song with a "mesmerizing rhythm figure and cheeky lyrics" that "easily sticks in the brain." Lamb, however, felt it was one-dimensial and repetitive, comparing it to Nelly Furtado's "Say It Right" and Justin Timberlake's "My Love", both produced and co-written by Timbaland. Andy Kellman of Allmusic writes that "it is immediate enough to connect on the first listen, while Tim also sneaks in enough subtle layers to make it increasingly insidious with each play." Houston Chronicle's Zharmer Hardimon, despite dismissing Timbaland's rapping, praises it as the album's best track. David Hyland of WESH Orlando defines the song as "an example of the outside-the-box approach to hit-making that has earned Tim his reputation" while also praising Furtado and Timberlake for their vocal performances, writing that they sound "seductive" and "convincing as a possible suitor" respectively. Kelefa Sanneh of New York Times compared "Give It to Me" to Scott Storch's "Built Like That" and declared Timbaland's song the winner, writing "It's an instantly addictive song built from a muscular rhythm and a few well-placed synthesizer notes." Norman Mayers of Prefix Magazine declared the song to be one of the album's best tracks, claiming that Timbaland's "fluttering grooves" and Furtado's and Timberlake's "boastful verses" merged perfectly.

PopMatters writer Mike Schiller describes the song as "a combination of every single beat on the Nelly Furtado album (Loose)" while later commenting that, with Timberlake's and Timbaland's vocals, it is an infectious all-star cut. Steve "Flash" Juon of RapReviews labeled it as a "triumvirate of hip-pop perfection" while Jody Rosen praised it as the catchiest song on the album. Evan McGarvey of Stylus Magazine wrote "The song never comes together though, all of its constituent parts resemble diluted tools from other, more inspired Mosley moments." The Guardian's Alexis Petridis praised the song for its hooks, which he describes as irresistible, and its moments of unpredictability. The song was nominated for the Grammy Award for Best Pop Collaboration with Vocals at the 50th Annual Grammy Awards.

== Commercial performance ==
In the United States, "Give It to Me" debuted on the Billboard Hot 100 on the week ending February 24, 2007, at number eighty-seven. The song slowly rose the chart for weeks until the week ending April 21, 2007, when the song ascended forty-one places, from forty-two, to number one. The rise was caused by the strength of 248,000 downloads sold within that week, logging the second-best digital sales for a song's first week at the time, behind Justin Timberlake's "SexyBack". The song has, as of July 23, 2010, sold 1,880,000 downloads in the United States, standing as Timbaland's third best selling solo single behind "Apologize" and "The Way I Are". It also stands as his only solo single in the United States to attain the number one position on the Billboard Hot 100.

In Furtado's native Canada, "Give It to Me" debuted at number two on the Canadian Hot 100, where it peaked for one week, on the issue dated June 7, 2007. It lasted a total of thirteen weeks on the chart, spending its last week at number 44. In the United Kingdom, "Give It to Me" debuted at number eight on the UK Singles Chart on April 8, 2007 – for the week ending date April 14, 2007 – and rose seven places to the summit of the chart the following week. On April 22, 2007 – for the week ending date April 28, 2007 – "Give It to Me" was dethroned from the top of the UK Singles Chart after one week by "Beautiful Liar" by Beyoncé and Shakira, falling two places to number three. The song spent a total of ten weeks in the top ten and 26 weeks in the top 100 of the chart.

In Ireland, "Give It to Me" debuted at number thirty-three on the Irish Singles Chart and fell off the next week. On April 12, 2007, two weeks later, the song reappeared on the chart at number six. It peaked on the chart at number two during its sixth week and lasted more than ten weeks in the top ten. In Switzerland, the song peaked at number six on the Swiss Singles Chart on the week ending date July 1, 2007. It spent five non-consecutive weeks in the top ten and a total of forty-nine weeks on the chart, slowly descending the chart following the week at its peak position. In Germany, the song reached its peak at number three and held the position for two nonconsecutive weeks. In Austria, "Give It to Me" peaked at number three on the Austrian Singles Chart, and logged a total of 34 weeks on the chart.

== Music video ==
On February 26, 2007, the music video for "Give It to Me" was premiered on MTV's Total Request Live. It shows Timbaland, Nelly Furtado, and Justin Timberlake performing the song at the 2007 Grammy Awards pre-show concert, and is intercut with footage from a studio recording session and from inside Timbaland's tour bus. The clip also shows Furtado singing on a balcony of Four Seasons Hotel in Los Angeles. The video was directed by Paul Coy Allen and Timbaland and appeared at number ninety-eight on BET's Notarized: Top 100 Videos of 2007 countdown.

The music video on YouTube has received over 175 million views as of April 2024.

== Track listing ==
UK and European 2-track CD single

1. "Give It to Me" (radio edit) – 3:33
2. "Give It to Me" (instrumental) – 3:55

Australian and European CD maxi-single

1. "Give It to Me" (radio edit) – 3:33
2. "Give It to Me" (instrumental) – 3:55
3. "Come Around" (featuring M.I.A.) – 3:57
4. "Give It to Me" (video) – 3:55

European 12-inch vinyl

1. "Give It to Me" (radio edit) – 3:33
2. "Give It to Me" (explicit) – 3:55
3. "Give It to Me" (instrumental) – 3:55
4. "Give It to Me" (a cappella explicit) – 3:30

== Credits and personnel ==
Credits are adapted from the liner notes of Shock Value, released through Mosley Music Group, in association with Blackground Records and Interscope Records.

Recording and mixing

- Recorded at Thomas Crown Studios in Virginia Beach, Virginia and Chalice Recording Studios in Los Angeles
- Mixing at Thomas Crown Studios in Virginia Beach, Virginia and The Village in Los Angeles

Personnel

- Songwriting – Tim Mosley, Nate Hills, Timothy Clayton, Justin Timberlake, Nelly Furtado
- Production – Timbaland, Danja
- Recording, mixing and programming – Demacio "Demo" Castellón
- Mixing (assistant) – Matty Green
- Drums – Timbaland
- Keyboard and bass – Timbaland, Danja

== Charts ==
=== Weekly charts ===
Weekly chart performance for "Give It to Me"
Chart (2007)	Peak position
Australia (ARIA)	16
Australian Urban (ARIA)	4
Austria (Ö3 Austria Top 40)	3
Belgium (Ultratop 50 Flanders)	4
Belgium (Ultratop 50 Wallonia)	7
Canada Hot 100 (Billboard)	1
Canada CHR/Top 40 (Billboard)	1
Canada Hot AC (Billboard)	10
CIS Airplay (TopHit)	5
Croatia (HRT)	3
Czech Republic Airplay (ČNS IFPI)	4
Denmark (Tracklisten)	1
Europe (Eurochart Hot 100)	1
Finland (Suomen virallinen lista)	6
France (SNEP)	7
Germany (GfK)	3
Hungary (Rádiós Top 40)	1
Hungary (Single Top 40)	10
Ireland (IRMA)	2
Italy (FIMI)	8
Latvia (Latvian Airplay Top 50)	1
Lithuania (EHR)	11
Netherlands (Dutch Top 40)	7
Netherlands (Single Top 100)	8
New Zealand (Recorded Music NZ)	2
Norway (VG-lista)	4
Romania (Romanian Top 100)	2
Russia Airplay (TopHit)	4
Scottish Singles Sales (Official Charts)	4
Slovakia Airplay (ČNS IFPI)	23
Sweden (Sverigetopplistan)	21
Switzerland (Schweizer Hitparade)	6
UK Singles (Official Charts)	1
UK Airplay (Music Week)	9
UK Hip Hop/R&B (Official Charts)	1
US Billboard Hot 100	1
US Pop Airplay (Billboard)	3
US Hot R&B/Hip-Hop Songs (Billboard)	38
US Rhythmic Airplay (Billboard)	4

2026 weekly chart performance for "Give It to Me"
Chart (2026)	Peak position
Poland Airplay (OLiS)	84

=== Year-end charts ===
Year-end chart performance for "Give It to Me"
Chart (2007)	Position
Australia (ARIA)	55
Austria (Ö3 Austria Top 40)	19
Belgium (Ultratop 50 Flanders)	19
Belgium (Ultratop 50 Wallonia)	23
Brazil (Crowley)	17
CIS (TopHit)	12
Europe (Eurochart Hot 100)	11
France (SNEP)	70
Germany (Media Control GfK)	14
Hungary (Rádiós Top 40)	8
Netherlands (Dutch Top 40)	63
Netherlands (Single Top 100)	48
New Zealand (RIANZ)	13
Romania (Romanian Top 100)	13
Russia Airplay (TopHit)	8
Sweden (Sverigetopplistan)	77
Switzerland (Schweizer Hitparade)	19
UK Singles (OCC)	22
UK Urban (Music Week)	1
US Billboard Hot 100	21
US Rhythmic Airplay (Billboard)	29

=== Decade-end charts ===
Decade-end chart performance for "Give It to Me"
Chart (2000–2009)	Position
CIS Airplay (TopHit)	76
Russia Airplay (TopHit)	62

== Certifications ==
Certifications for "Give It to Me"
Region	Certification	Certified units/sales
Belgium (BRMA)	Gold	25,000^{*}
Canada (Music Canada)	2× Platinum	160,000^{‡}
Denmark (IFPI Danmark)	Platinum	15,000^{^}
Germany (BVMI)	3× Gold	450,000^{‡}
New Zealand (RMNZ)	2× Platinum	60,000^{‡}
Norway (IFPI Norway)	Gold	5,000^{*}
Switzerland (IFPI Switzerland)	Platinum	30,000^{^}
United Kingdom (BPI)	Platinum	600,000^{‡}
United States (RIAA)	3× Platinum	3,000,000^{‡}
^{*} Sales figures based on certification alone.^{^} Shipments figures based on certification alone.^{‡} Sales+streaming figures based on certification alone.

== Release history ==
Release history and formats for "Give It to Me"
Region	Date	Format	Label	Ref.
United States	February 6, 2007	Contemporary hit radio; rhythmic contemporary radio	Mosley; Blackground; Interscope	
United States	March 13, 2007	Urban contemporary radio	Mosley; Blackground; Interscope	
Germany	April 6, 2007	Maxi single	Universal	
United Kingdom	April 9, 2007	CD single	Polydor	
United Kingdom	April 9, 2007	Digital download	Polydor	
Canada	May 15, 2007	Digital download ("Laugh at Em" Remix)	Universal	
United States	May 15, 2007	Digital download ("Laugh at Em" Remix)	Mosley; Blackground; Interscope	

== See also ==
- List of number-one hits in Denmark
- List of European number-one hits of 2007
- List of number-one singles from the 2000s (UK)
- List of Hot 100 number-one singles of 2007 (U.S.)
