= Get Loose Tour =

2007–08 concert tour by Nelly Furtado

- Tour by Nelly Furtado
- Promotional poster for the tour
- Associated album: Loose
- Start date: February 16, 2007
- End date: July 15, 2008
- No. of shows: 60

Nelly Furtado concert chronology
- Come as You Are Tour (2004); Get Loose Tour (2006–08); Mi Plan Tour (2010)

The Get Loose Tour was the third concert tour by Canadian singer-songwriter Nelly Furtado. The tour showcased material from her third studio album, Loose (2006). A live album, Loose: The Concert, originated from the April 4, 2007, concert in Toronto.

== Background ==
After Loose garnered considerable sales and attention, Nelly Furtado announced a tour of Europe and North America. Nelly stated:

For the last eight years I’ve never really traveled with a full production of lights, visuals and dancers – and this tour I’ve got all of it. I’ve spent eight years building my musicality so that now I can rely on that, but then I also have a great backup up there with all the production, which is a treat for me.

The set consisted of a white stage, a multi-leveled band setup with LCD screens, two parallel multi-story white palm trees, a large LED screen, and a white stage curtain.

The show is inspired by Miami. There's palm trees on the set, white palm trees and a white stage, and it's got a little bit of drama to it. I think the show's a little more sensual or sophisticated, but I keep the primary focus on the songs.

Furtado was backed by four dancers and her six-piece band, including Toronto rapper Saukrates on percussion who also fills in for Loose producer Timbaland on some of the tracks from Loose.

The Get Loose Tour started in North America with seven shows, followed by Europe with 23 shows over five weeks. The Canadian leg began shortly afterward in Victoria, B.C. (Furtado's birthplace) where the mayor proclaimed March 21 as Nelly Furtado Day. After the first leg was completed plans were announced for Furtado to visit the United States.

The second leg in the United States consisted of a more budget production. The LED screen was replaced by a light-up disco ball, the white curtains were replaced by a large LED sheet, and most notably the palm trees vanished. Furtado also wore her hair differently for these shows and changed her costumes.

The third leg consisted of a number of open air festivals during the summer season in Europe. Costumes for this leg of the tour were provided by a famous French designer.

== Setlist ==
1. "Say It Right"
2. "Turn off the Light"
3. "Powerless (Say What You Want)"
4. "Do It" / "Wait for You"
5. "Showtime"
6. "Crazy"
7. "In God's Hands"
8. "Try"
9. "All Good Things (Come to an End)"
10. "Give it to Me"
11. "I'm like a Bird"
12. "Glow" / "Heart of Glass"
13. "Força"
14. "Promiscuous"
15. "Party" / "No Hay Igual"
16. "Maneater"

== Shows ==
List of 2007 concerts
Date	City	Country	Venue	Attendance	Revenue
February 16, 2007	Manchester	England	Men Arena	—	—
February 17, 2007	Glasgow	Scotland	Clyde Auditorium	—	—
February 18, 2007	Nottingham	England	Arena	—	—
February 20, 2007	Birmingham	England	NEC	—	—
February 21, 2007	London	England	Hammersmith Apollo	—	—
February 24, 2007	Paris	France	Olympia	—	—
February 25, 2007	Düsseldorf	Germany	Philipshalle	—	—
February 26, 2007	Brussels	Belgium	Forest National	—	—
February 28, 2007	Milan	Italy	Alcatraz	—	—
March 3, 2007	Winterthur	Switzerland	Eishalle Deutweg	—	—
March 5, 2007	Stuttgart	Germany	Porsche Arena	—	—
March 6, 2007	Munich	Germany	Olympiahalle	—	—
March 7, 2007	Vienna	Austria	Gasometer	—	—
March 8, 2007	Leipzig	Germany	Arena	—	—
March 10, 2007	Frankfurt	Germany	Jahrhunderthalle Frankfurt	—	—
March 11, 2007	Hamburg	Germany	Sporthalle	—	—
March 12, 2007	Berlin	Germany	Arena Treptow	—	—
March 13, 2007	Amsterdam	Netherlands	Heineken Music Hall	—	—
March 15, 2007	Amsterdam	Netherlands	Heineken Music Hall	—	—
March 16, 2007	Copenhagen	Denmark	Valby Hall	—	—
March 17, 2007	Stockholm	Sweden	Hovet	—	—
March 21, 2007	Victoria	Canada	Save on Foods Memorial Centre	—	—
March 22, 2007	Vancouver	Canada	General Motors Place	8,529 / 13,754	$407,758
March 23, 2007	Kelowna	Canada	Prospera Place	—	—
March 25, 2007	Grande Prairie	Canada	Crystal Centre	—	—
March 26, 2007	Edmonton	Canada	Shaw Conference Centre	—	—
March 27, 2007	Calgary	Canada	Pengrowth Saddledome	6,758 / 6,758	$310,086
April 4, 2007	Toronto	Canada	Air Canada Centre	11,373 / 11,373	$508,780
April 5, 2007	Montreal	Canada	Bell Centre	—	—
April 6, 2007	Ottawa	Canada	Scotiabank Place	—	—
May 30, 2007	Hollywood	United States	Hard Rock Live	—	—
May 31, 2007	Orlando	United States	Hard Rock Live	—	—
June 1, 2007	Atlanta	United States	Fox Theatre	—	—
June 3, 2007	Portsmouth	United States	NTELOS Pavilion	—	—
June 4, 2007	Sayreville	United States	Starland Ballroom	—	—
June 5, 2007	Boston	United States	Agganis Arena	—	—
June 7, 2007	New York City	United States	Wamu Theater at Madison Square Garden	—	—
June 8, 2007	Fairfax	United States	Patriot Center	—	—
June 9, 2007	Cleveland	United States	Tower City Amphitheater	—	—
June 11, 2007	Detroit	United States	Detroit Opera House	—	—
June 12, 2007	Rosemont	United States	Rosemont Theatre	—	—
June 13, 2007	Saint Paul	United States	Xcel Energy Center	—	—
June 15, 2007	Denver	United States	The Fillmore Auditorium	—	—
June 17, 2007	Grand Prairie	United States	Nokia Live at Grand Prairie	—	—
June 19, 2007	Phoenix	United States	Dodge Theatre	—	—
June 20, 2007	Los Angeles	United States	Greek Theatre	—	—
June 21, 2007	Oakland	United States	Paramount Theatre	—	—
June 23, 2007	Las Vegas	United States	Red Rock Casino Resort Spa	—	—
July 14, 2007 (Note: This concert was part of Concert de La Fraternte.)	Paris	France	Champ de Mars	—	—
July 27, 2007	Albufeira	Portugal	E.M. Albufeira	—	—
July 28, 2007	Cantanhede	Portugal	Expofacic	—	—

List of 2008 concerts
Date	City	Country	Venue
February 23, 2008 (Note: The concert was part of the Viña del Mar International Song Festival.)	Viña del Mar	Chile	Anfiteatro de la Quinta Vergara
July 4, 2008	Amsterdam	Netherlands	Westerpark
July 6, 2008	Bucharest	Romania	B'est Fest
July 8, 2008	Munich	Germany	Reitstadion
July 9, 2008	Wiesbaden	Germany	Bowling Green
July 10, 2008	Dresden	Germany	Elbufer
July 11, 2008	Poznań	Poland	Malta Lake Summer Stage
July 13, 2008	Moscow	Russia	Olympiski
July 15, 2008	Kyiv	Ukraine	MBZ
