= In God's Hands =

In God's Hands may refer to:

- In God's Hands (film), a 1998 film directed by Zalman King.
- "In God's Hands" (song), a single by Nelly Furtado from her 2006 album Loose.
