= All Good Things (Come to an End) =

2006 single by Canadian singer Nelly Furtado

Single by Nelly Furtado

from the album Loose
- B-side: "Maneater"; "No Hay Igual"
- Released: 24 November 2006
- Studio: Hit Factory Criteria (Miami)
- Genre: Electropop
- Length: 5:11
- Label: Geffen
- Songwriters: Nelly Furtado; Timbaland; Chris Martin; Danja
- Producers: Timbaland; Danja

Nelly Furtado singles chronology
| "Say It Right" (2006) | "All Good Things (Come to an End)" (2006) | "Give It to Me" (2007) |

Music video
- "Nelly Furtado - All Good Things (Come To An End) (US Version) (Official Music Video)" on YouTube

Music video
- "Nelly Furtado - All Good Things (Come To An End) ft. Di Ferrero" on YouTube

"All Good Things (Come to an End)" is a song by Canadian singer Nelly Furtado from her third studio album, Loose (2006). It was written by Furtado, Tim "Timbaland" Mosley, Chris Martin, and Nate "Danja" Hills. The song was released as the album's third European single in November 2006. It was released as the fourth single in the United States and Australia. The single features Chris Martin, frontman of the band Coldplay, harmonizing throughout the song. The original version of the song included Martin saying a few words at the beginning and singing the chorus behind Furtado. This version was finally included on the 20th Anniversary Deluxe Edition of Loose as a "Secret Demo Version".

Critically, "All Good Things (Come to an End)" was praised for having diversity in comparison to other songs on Loose but at the same time criticized for its mellowness. Commercially, the song reached number one in 12 European countries, including Austria, the Czech Republic, Denmark, Germany, and the Netherlands. It was Europe's third-most-successful song of 2007. Outside Europe, the single peaked at number five in Canada, number 12 in both Australia and New Zealand, and number 86 in the United States.

== Writing and recording ==
"All Good Things" was conceived near the end of the recording of Loose. Furtado was at the 2005 MTV Video Music Awards ceremony, which was held in Miami, Florida in August, when she bumped into her old friend Chris Martin, who had been performing with Coldplay. Furtado told Martin she was working with Timbaland on a new album, and Martin said he "loved" Timbaland and asked if he could visit the studio. Timbaland had been listening to Coldplay's album X&Y in the studio frequently the previous week, so Furtado agreed and invited Martin to The Hit Factory the following night.

== Critical reception ==
"All Good Things" was reviewed favorably by critics, often comparing the song to Furtado's previous records. An MSN UK review of the song described it as "a reflective and emotional ballad with a strong melody, presumably the input of the Coldplay man, and lyrics which remind us that Nelly's still like a bird, albeit one who likes a bit of night-time action"; it gave the song 4.5 out of five stars. HMV UK published a four out of five star review in which its writer said that, in contrast to the album's previous singles, "Maneater" and "Promiscuous", "All Good Things" is "a beautiful, hooky, emotive ballad". Chuck Taylor of Billboard magazine wrote that the song is "adventurous, hip, playful and enduring. Featuring an enlightened lyric ("Pain sets in and I don't cry/I only feel gravity and wonder why") with the track's hypnotic melody featuring contribution from Coldplay's Chris Martin, "Good" lives up to Furtado's 2001 double Grammy Award nods." dotMusic called the song "a superior goosebumps slowie." AllMusic's Stephan Thomas described the song as an "ideal soundtracks to chill-out moments".

== Release and chart performance ==
The single reached number four in the United Kingdom. In countries such as the Netherlands and Austria, it peaked higher than "Maneater" and "Promiscuous" and became Furtado's first number-one hit in the Netherlands and Germany, where it was the second-most-successful single of 2007. The song reached number one in 20 countries, including Switzerland and Austria. It topped the Eurochart Hot 100 Singles – Furtado's first number one on the chart – and reached number five on the United World Tracks Chart.

The song was released as the fourth single from Loose in the United States and Australia in 2006. It debuted at number 20 on the Australian ARIA Singles Chart, rising to number 15 during its third week; in June, after descending the chart, it rose to a new peak of number 12, and it remained on the chart for 21 weeks, eventually gaining platinum status for shipments of 70,000 units. A new mix of the song was released to radio on 10 April in the US, where it debuted at number 99 on the Billboard Hot 100 and peaked at number 86.

== Music video ==
The "All Good Things" music video, directed by Gabriel Coss and Israel Lugo, was filmed in Puerto Rico and shot back-to-back with the music video for "Say It Right", the album's third single in North America. The video features a love story between Furtado and a male model, and Furtado is seen walking along a beach and into a forest, where she finds a dinner table hanging upside-down from a tree. There are accompanying shots of the model finding, and subsequently hanging from, the table. The video includes flashbacks to when Furtado and the model were eating at the table, and it ends with them holding each other under a stream of water. Furtado said that the video is "very tropical and romantic" and reminded her of videos for Sarah McLachlan singles: "it has that element of art to it. It's kind of like cinema."

The initial music video featured for the UK release was released prior to the US version in 2006. The music video is similar to the international release with varied shots and a different radio mix of the song. A third version was released with Di Ferrero.

== Track listings ==
- UK and European 2-track CD single
1. "All Good Things (Come to an End)" (radio edit) – 4:23
2. "Maneater" (Radio 1 Live Lounge Session) – 3:01
- Australian and European CD maxi-single
1. "All Good Things (Come to an End)" (radio edit) – 4:23
2. "Maneater" (Radio 1 Live Lounge Session) – 3:01
3. "No Hay Igual" (featuring Calle 13) – 3:41
4. "All Good Things (Come to an End)" (video)
- UK 12-inch single

A1. "All Good Things (Come to an End)" (radio edit) – 4:23
A2. "Promiscuous" (Ralphi Rosario radio mix) – 3:43
B1. "No Hay Igual" (featuring Calle 13) – 3:41
B2. "No Hay Igual" (instrumental) – 3:37

- German 2-track CD single
1. "All Good Things (Come to an End)" (radio edit) – 4:23
2. "All Good Things (Come to an End)" (featuring Rea Garvey) – 3:56
- German CD maxi-single
1. "All Good Things (Come to an End)" (radio edit) – 4:23
2. "All Good Things (Come to an End)" (featuring Rea Garvey) – 3:56
3. "Maneater" (Radio 1 Live Lounge Session) – 3:01
4. "All Good Things (Come to an End)" (video)

== Charts ==
=== Weekly charts ===
| Chart (2006–2007) | Peak position |
|---|---|
| Australia (ARIA) | 12 |
| Australian Urban (ARIA) | 3 |
| Austria (Ö3 Austria Top 40) | 1 |
| Belgium (Ultratop 50 Flanders) | 1 |
| Belgium (Ultratop 50 Wallonia) | 4 |
| Canada Hot 100 (Billboard) | 5 |
| Canada AC (Billboard) | 16 |
| Canada CHR/Top 40 (Billboard) | 4 |
| Canada Hot AC (Billboard) | 3 |
| Croatia (HRT) | 1 |
| Czech Republic Airplay (ČNS IFPI) | 1 |
| Denmark (Tracklisten) | 1 |
| European Hot 100 Singles (Billboard) | 1 |
| France (SNEP) | 6 |
| Germany (GfK) | 1 |
| Hungary (Dance Top 40) | 1 |
| Hungary (Rádiós Top 40) | 1 |
| Ireland (IRMA) | 8 |
| Italy (FIMI) | 1 |
| Latvia (Latvian Airplay Top 50) | 1 |
| Lithuania (EHR) | 1 |
| Netherlands (Dutch Top 40) | 1 |
| Netherlands (Single Top 100) | 1 |
| New Zealand (Recorded Music NZ) | 12 |
| Norway (VG-lista) | 1 |
| Poland (Polish Airplay Charts) | 1 |
| Romania (Romanian Top 100) | 2 |
| Scottish Singles Sales (Official Charts) | 8 |
| Slovakia Airplay (ČNS IFPI) | 1 |
| Sweden (Sverigetopplistan) | 5 |
| Switzerland (Schweizer Hitparade) | 1 |
| UK Singles (Official Charts) | 4 |
| UK Hip Hop/R&B (Official Charts) | 2 |
| US Billboard Hot 100 | 86 |
| US Dance Club Songs (Billboard) | 1 |
| US Dance Airplay (Billboard) | 11 |

=== Year-end charts ===
| Chart (2006) | Position |
|---|---|
| Switzerland (Schweizer Hitparade) | 28 |
| UK Singles (OCC) | 120 |

| Chart (2007) | Position |
|---|---|
| Australia (ARIA) | 50 |
| Australian Urban (ARIA) | 8 |
| Austria (Ö3 Austria Top 40) | 5 |
| Belgium (Ultratop 50 Flanders) | 8 |
| Belgium (Ultratop 50 Wallonia) | 13 |
| European Hot 100 Singles (Billboard) | 3 |
| France (SNEP) | 31 |
| Germany (Media Control GfK) | 2 |
| Hungary (Rádiós Top 40) | 1 |
| Netherlands (Dutch Top 40) | 12 |
| Netherlands (Single Top 100) | 9 |
| Romania (Airplay 100) | 33 |
| Sweden (Sverigetopplistan) | 42 |
| Switzerland (Schweizer Hitparade) | 4 |
| UK Singles (OCC) | 115 |
| US Dance Club Play (Billboard) | 46 |

=== Decade-end charts ===
| Chart (2000–2009) | Position |
|---|---|
| Germany (Media Control GfK) | 15 |

== Certifications ==
| Region | Certification | Certified units/sales |
|---|---|---|
| Australia (ARIA) | Platinum | 70,000^{^} |
| Belgium (BRMA) | Gold | 25,000^{*} |
| Brazil (Pro-Música Brasil) | Gold | 30,000^{‡} |
| Canada (Music Canada) | Platinum | 80,000^{‡} |
| Denmark (IFPI Danmark) | Platinum | 8,000^{^} |
| Germany (BVMI) | 2× Platinum | 600,000^{‡} |
| Italy | — | 51,600 |
| New Zealand (RMNZ) | Gold | 15,000^{‡} |
| Norway (IFPI Norway) | Gold | 5,000^{*} |
| Spain (Promusicae) | Platinum | 20,000^{^} |
| Sweden (GLF) | Gold | 10,000^{^} |
| Switzerland (IFPI Switzerland) | Platinum | 30,000^{^} |
| United Kingdom (BPI) | Silver | 200,000^{‡} |
| United States (RIAA) | Gold | 500,000^{‡} |
^{*} Sales figures based on certification alone.^{^} Shipments figures based on certification alone.^{‡} Sales+streaming figures based on certification alone.

== Release history ==
Release dates and formats for "All Good Things (Come to an End)"
| Region | Date | Version(s) | Format(s) | Label(s) | Ref. |
|---|---|---|---|---|---|
| Germany | 24 November 2006 | Original | CD; maxi CD | Universal Music | |
| United Kingdom | 27 November 2006 | Original | 12-inch vinyl; CD | Polydor | |
| France | 5 March 2007 | Original | CD | Polydor | |
| Australia | 9 April 2007 | Original | Maxi CD | Universal Music | |
| United States | 5 June 2007 | Spanish | Digital download | Geffen; Mosley | |
| Germany | 26 May 2008 | Brazilian | Digital download | Universal Music | |
| United States | 28 May 2021 | Remix | Digital download; streaming | Universal Music | |

== See also ==
- List of Dutch Top 40 number-one singles of 2007
- List of European number-one hits of 2007
- List of number-one dance singles of 2007 (U.S.)
- List of number-one hits in Denmark
- List of number-one hits in Norway
- List of number-one hits of 2006 (Germany)
- List of number-one hits of 2006 and 2007 (Switzerland)
- List of number-one hits of 2007 (Austria)
- List of number-one hits of 2007 (Italy)
- Ultratop 50 number-one hits of 2007
