= List of number-one albums of 2007 (Poland) =

These are the Polish number one albums of 2007, per the OLiS Chart.

== Chart history ==
Issue Date	Album	Artist(s)	Reference(s)
January 8	Psałterz Wrześniowy	Zbigniew Książek, Piotr Rubik	
January 15	Psałterz Wrześniowy	Zbigniew Książek, Piotr Rubik	
January 22	Psałterz Wrześniowy	Zbigniew Książek, Piotr Rubik	
January 29	Psałterz Wrześniowy	Zbigniew Książek, Piotr Rubik	
February 5	Dlaczego nie!	Muzyka filmowa	
February 12	Not Too Late	Norah Jones	
February 19	Loose	Nelly Furtado	
February 26	Loose	Nelly Furtado	
March 5	Loose	Nelly Furtado	
March 12	Loose	Nelly Furtado	
March 19	Loose	Nelly Furtado	
March 26	Loose	Nelly Furtado	
April 2	Loose	Nelly Furtado	
April 10	Joyful	Ayo	
April 16	Joyful	Ayo	
April 23	Joyful	Ayo	
April 30	Loose	Nelly Furtado	
May 14	Loose	Nelly Furtado	
May 21	ID	Anna Maria Jopek	
May 28	ID	Anna Maria Jopek	
June 4	ID	Anna Maria Jopek	
June 11	UniSexBlues	Kasia Nosowska	
June 18	ID	Anna Maria Jopek	
June 25	UniSexBlues	Kasia Nosowska	
July 2	Ślad	Kombii	
July 9	The Best Disco... Ever!	Różni wykonawcy	
July 16	The Best Disco... Ever!	Różni wykonawcy	
July 23	The Best Disco... Ever!	Różni wykonawcy	
July 30	RMF FM Najlepsza muzyka pod słońcem	Różni wykonawcy	
August 6	Diamond Bitch	Doda	
August 13	Diamond Bitch	Doda	
August 20	Diamond Bitch	Doda	
August 27	Diamond Bitch	Doda	
September 3	Diamond Bitch	Doda	
September 10	RMF FM Najlepsza muzyka na imprezę	Różni wykonawcy	
September 17	Londyn 8:15	IRA	
September 24	Nieprzygoda	Happysad	
October 1	Back to Black	Amy Winehouse	
October 8	Młynarski	Raz, Dwa, Trzy	
October 15	Młynarski	Raz, Dwa, Trzy	
October 22	Młynarski	Raz, Dwa, Trzy	
October 29	Młynarski	Raz, Dwa, Trzy	
November 5	Feel	Feel	
November 12	Feel	Feel	
November 19	Feel	Feel	
November 26	MTV Unplugged	Hey	
December 3	MTV Unplugged	Hey	
December 10	MTV Unplugged	Hey	
December 17	MTV Unplugged	Hey	
December 24	The Best Christmas Album... Ever!	Różni wykonawcy	
December 31	The Best Christmas Album... Ever!	Różni wykonawcy	
