= In God's Hands (song) =

2007 single by Nelly Furtado

Single by Nelly Furtado

from the album Loose
- Released: November 23, 2007
- Studio: Capitol; Chill Building; Track Record (Los Angeles)
- Length: 4:12
- Label: Geffen; Mosley
- Songwriters: Nelly Furtado; Rick Nowels
- Producers: Rick Nowels; Nelly Furtado

Nelly Furtado singles chronology
"Do It" (2007)	"In God's Hands" (2007)	"Win or Lose" (2008)

Alternative cover
- Duet version cover

Keith Urban singles chronology
"Everybody" (2007)	"In God's Hands" (2008)	"You Look Good in My Shirt" (2008)

Music video
- "In God's Hands" on YouTube

"In God's Hands" is a song recorded by Canadian singer-songwriter Nelly Furtado for her third studio album Loose (2006). It was written and produced by Furtado and Rick Nowels. The song was released as the eighth and final single from Loose on November 23, 2007, by Geffen Records and Mosley Music Group. Furtado later re-recorded the song as a duet with Australian-American country singer Keith Urban; the version was released on April 15, 2008.

"In God's Hands" achieved only moderate success, becoming her lowest-charting single from Loose in every European country in which it was promoted. Following the song's North American re-release in 2008, however, "In God's Hands" reached its peak at number 11 on the Canadian Hot 100, earning Furtado her second highest-charting single to date since the chart's inception in 2007, and also peaked at a career-high position of 15 on the Billboard Adult Contemporary chart.

== Lyrics ==
"In God's Hands" is inspired by Furtado's 2005 breakup with DJ Jasper Gahunia, the father of her daughter. According to Furtado, the song was, at the time of its recording, "as far as [she] was willing to go in terms of pop right now".

Lyrically, the song is about moving on and starting anew, with Furtado declaring in the chorus, "Our love's floating up in the sky in heaven/ Where it began, back in God's hands." Her vocal style on the song has been described as "pretty."

Furtado also recorded a Spanish version, titled "En las manos de Dios", which appears in a Spanish limited edition of Loose.

== Re-recording ==
In early 2008, Furtado re-recorded "In God's Hands" as a duet featuring Australian-American country music singer Keith Urban, who was reportedly Furtado's "first choice." On her rationale behind the selection, Furtado said, "I love country music. Keith Urban's voice is plaintive and sweet; he's a pure songsmith, with an extremely humble tone to his voice... He's right on the border of country, roots and pop. He really defies description, and those are my favorite kinds of artists."

== Critical reception ==
Sean Fennessey of Pitchfork criticized the songwriting on the chorus and wrote that, "If "Promiscuous" is one of the fiercest songs of lust in recent memory, "In God's Hands" is one of the limpest." Jonathan Keefe of Slant was more ambivalent, praising Furtado's vocals but maligning the song's inclusion on Loose. "While "In God's Hands" is one of the first times in her career that Furtado's voice could... be described as pretty," writes Keefe, "the song itself... simply doesn't fit with the first two-thirds of the album."

== Commercial performance ==
"In God's Hands" debuted and peaked at number 116 on the UK Singles Chart dated August 11, 2007. It was the first single of Furtado's career (that was promoted to the United Kingdom) to miss the top 100. Elsewhere in Europe, the song performed moderately well. It reached a peak position at number 53 in Austria, number 33 in Germany, number 20 in Italy, number 33 in the Netherlands, and number 58 in Sweden. "In God's Hands" also reached numbers nine and 22, respectively, on the Flanders and Wallonian Ultratip Bubbling Under charts.

The 2008 duet version of the song debuted at number 11 on the Canadian Hot 100 chart dated May 3, 2008 and was the week's highest debut. This tied it with "Say It Right" as Furtado's second highest-charting single to date in her native country since the creation of the Canadian Hot 100 chart in 2007. "In God's Hands" also reached number seven on the Digital Songs component chart dated May 3, 2008. The song spent a total of 16 weeks on the Canadian Hot 100. In the United States, "In God's Hands" entered the Billboard Adult Contemporary chart dated April 26, 2008 at number 25 and was the week's highest debut. On the chart dated June 21, 2008, the song rose to number 18, breaking out of a tie with "Say It Right" for Furtado's highest-charting adult contemporary single to date. It reached its peak at number 15 on the chart dated July 26, 2008.

== Music video ==
A music video for the song was shot on May 9, 2007 between 5 and 7 a.m. in Los Angeles, California and directed by Jesse Dylan. It features Furtado on a beach during both daytime and nighttime, singing the song while sitting on a tree stump, lying on the sand and holding a white sheet, which she lies under. Furtado is also shown walking on the shore, weeping and looking onto the ocean. The video is shot entirely in black and white. It was made available via Furtado's Vevo channel on February 12, 2008.

== Track listings and formats ==
- European CD single and digital download
1. "In God's Hands" (album version) — 4:12
2. "In God's Hands" (Loose: The Concert) — 4:46
- European maxi CD single and digital EP
1. "In God's Hands" (album version) — 4:12
2. "In God's Hands" (Loose: The Concert) — 4:46
3. "I'm Like a Bird" (Loose: The Concert) — 5:51
4. "In God's Hands" (music video) — 4:09
- UK digital download
1. "In God's Hands" (album version) — 4:12
2. "In God's Hands" (music video) — 4:10
- 2008 digital download
1. "In God's Hands" (featuring Keith Urban) — 4:33

== Charts ==
=== Weekly charts ===
2007–2008 weekly chart performance for "In God's Hands" (Note: In Australia, Canada, and the US, the duet version of "In God's Hands" charted instead of the original.)
Chart	Peak position
Australia (ARIA)	66
Austria (Ö3 Austria Top 40)	53
Belgium (Ultratip Bubbling Under Flanders)	9
Belgium (Ultratip Bubbling Under Wallonia)	22
Canada Hot 100 (Billboard)	11
Canada AC (Billboard)	3
Canada Hot AC (Billboard)	35
Czech Republic Airplay (ČNS IFPI)	44
Germany (GfK)	33
Italy (FIMI)	20
Lithuania (EHR)	1
Netherlands (Dutch Top 40)	15
Netherlands (Single Top 100)	33
Slovakia Airplay (ČNS IFPI)	6
Sweden (Sverigetopplistan)	58
UK Singles (OCC)	116
US Adult Contemporary (Billboard)	15

=== Year-end charts ===
2008 year-end chart performance for "In God's Hands"
Chart	Position
Canada AC (Billboard)	12
Netherlands (Dutch Top 40)	100
US Adult Contemporary (Billboard)	35

== Release history ==
Release dates and formats
Region	Date	Format(s)	Version(s)	Label(s)	Ref.
Germany	November 23, 2007	CD; maxi CD	Original	Universal	
Europe	December 3, 2007	Digital download	Original	Universal	
Europe	December 17, 2007	Digital download (EP)	Original	Universal	
Canada	April 15, 2008	Digital download	Duet	Universal	
United States	April 15, 2008	Digital download	Duet	Geffen; Mosley	
France	April 28, 2008	Digital download	Duet	Polydor	
Italy	April 28, 2008	Digital download	Duet	Universal	
Germany	May 2, 2008	Digital download	Duet	Universal	
