= Loose (Nelly Furtado album) =

2006 studio album by Nelly Furtado

- Standard cover (Note: Walmart-exclusive and international tour edition covers display a blue background instead of red. Covers for limited summer, Spanish special, and French Mixes & Remixes editions use a yellow background. Deluxe edition cover displays a black background with gold typeface.)

Studio album by Nelly Furtado
- Released: June 7, 2006
- Recorded: 2005–2006
- Studios: The Hit Factory Criteria (Miami, Florida); Cubejam (Miami); Orange Lounge (Toronto, Canada); Chill Building (Santa Monica, California); Track Record (Hollywood, California); Capitol Studios (Hollywood)
- Genre: Pop
- Length: 54:20
- Languages: English; Spanish
- Labels: Mosley; Geffen
- Producers: Timbaland; Danja; Nisan Stewart; Lester Mendez; Rick Nowels; Nelly Furtado

Nelly Furtado chronology
Folklore (2003)	Loose (2006)	Loose: The Concert (2007)

Singles from Loose
- 1. "No Hay Igual" Released: April 11, 2006; 2. "Promiscuous" Released: April 25, 2006; 3. "Maneater" Released: May 26, 2006; 4. "Say It Right" Released: October 30, 2006; 5. "All Good Things (Come to an End)" Released: November 24, 2006; 6. "Te Busqué" Released: June 29, 2007; 7. "Do It" Released: July 24, 2007; 8. "In God's Hands" Released: November 23, 2007

Loose is the third studio album by Canadian singer-songwriter Nelly Furtado. It was released on June 7, 2006, by Geffen Records and Mosley Music Group. Recording sessions for Loose took place from 2005 to 2006. Timbaland and his protégé Danja produced the bulk of the album, primarily a pop album which incorporates influences of dance, R&B, hip hop, Latin pop, synth-pop, reggaeton, new wave, funk, trip hop, and Middle Eastern music. Lyrically, it explores the theme of female sexuality and has been described as introspective.

Overall, Loose was seen as critically and commercially successful. It reached high positions on the record charts of several markets, including number one in ten countries, and as of 2019, it has sold more than 10 million copies worldwide, making it one of the best-selling albums of the 21st century. However, the album received criticism because of the sexual image Furtado adopted, as some critics felt it was a ploy to sell more records.

Loose was heavily promoted, released in several editions and supported by the Get Loose Tour, which is the subject of the concert DVD, Loose: The Concert. The album debuted at number one on the US Billboard 200, making it Furtado's first album to top the chart, and spawned eight singles, including the Billboard Hot 100 number-one hits "Promiscuous" and "Say It Right", which received Grammy Award nominations for Best Pop Collaboration with Vocals and Best Female Pop Vocal Performance, respectively. Other notable singles include the UK Singles Chart number-one hit "Maneater" and the European number-one hit "All Good Things (Come to an End)”.

== Background ==
Furtado wanted to make a pop record to prove to herself that she could be more streamlined. Furtado cited Madonna's 1998 album Ray of Light as a major influence, saying "she was smooth but sexy, universal, epic, iconic!" Interscope chairman Jimmy Iovine suggested Furtado work with Timbaland, who had produced Missy Elliott's "Get Ur Freak On", which featured Furtado in a remix and a remix of Furtado's single "Turn Off the Light".

== Recording ==
Furtado began work on Loose by holding with emcee Jelleestone what she referred to as a "hip-hop workshop", in which they would "write rhymes, dissect them, and try different flows over beats." The first producers she worked with were Track & Field—who co-produced her first two albums, Whoa, Nelly! (2000) and Folklore (2003)—and by May 2005, she had collaborated with Swollen Members and K'naan. Furtado worked with Nellee Hooper in London on reggae-oriented material and with Lester Mendez in Los Angeles on acoustic songs. One of the tracks Mendez helped to create is "Te Busqué", which is co-written by and features Juanes, who collaborated with Furtado on his 2002 song "Fotografía". During her time in Los Angeles, she worked with Rick Nowels, who co-wrote and produced "In God's Hands", "Somebody to Love" and "Runaway".

In Miami, Florida, Furtado collaborated with Pharrell (who introduced her to reggaeton and who gave her a "shout-out" in his 2005 single "Can I Have It Like That") and Scott Storch (with whom she recorded a "straight-up rap song") before entering the studio with Timbaland. He and his protégé at the time, Danja, co-produced eight of the tracks, with another produced solely by Danja. For some of the beats on the songs, Timbaland finished work on ones already present in the studio that were half-developed or just "nucleuses"; the rest were completely reworked. Furtado recorded around forty tracks for Loose, deciding which she would include based on the sonics of the album—she called Timbaland "a sonic extraterrestrial" who came up with a sequence of songs that flowed, and said that the one she had devised was supposedly unsatisfactory. She recorded an unreleased collaboration with Justin Timberlake, "Crowd Control", which she described as "kind of sexy" and "a cute, clubby, upbeat, fun track". Other songs considered for inclusion on the album include "Chill Boy", "Friend of Mine", "Go", "Hands in the Air", "Pretty Boy", "Vice" and "Weak".

Furtado said in her diary on her official website that she recorded a remix of "Maneater" with rapper Lil Wayne; it was only released as part of a compilation album, Timbaland's Remix & Soundtrack Collection, she also used the instrumental of the song during many television performances of "Maneater". A version of "All Good Things (Come to an End)" featuring vocals by Coldplay lead singer Chris Martin, who co-wrote the song, was not released after a request from Martin's label, EMI. The song was released on the album, but only Furtado's vocals are featured. Furtado explained that "Loose was 90 percent written with a beat first, and then I’d write my melodies and songs to the beat."

== Post-production ==
The "off-the-cuff" conclusion to production was one of the reasons the album was titled Loose. It was named partly after the spontaneous decisions she made when creating the album. The album is also called Loose because it is "the opposite of calculated" and came naturally to Furtado and Timbaland; she called him her "distant musical cousin because he was always pushing boundaries and always carving out his own path", which she believed she was doing with Loose. "I think you have to keep surprising people as an artist, and I like that—I love doing that", she said. Loose was also named partly for the R&B girl group TLC, who Furtado said she admires for "taking back their sexuality, showing they were complete women." She said she wanted the album to be "assertive and cool" and "sexy but fun", like TLC, MC Lyte, Queen Latifah and Janet Jackson, who inspired Furtado because, as she put it, she was "comfortable in her sexuality and womanhood" when her 1993 single "That's the Way Love Goes" was released.

During the recording of Loose, Furtado listened to several electro and rock musicians, including Bloc Party, System of a Down, M.I.A., Feist, Queens of the Stone Age, Metric and Death from Above 1979, some of whom influenced the "rock sound" present on the album and the "coughing, laughing, distorted basslines" that were kept in the songs deliberately. According to her, music by such bands is "very loud and has a garage theme" to it, some of which she felt she captured on the album. Furtado has said rock music is "rhythmic again" and hip-hop-influenced after it had become "so churning and boring." Because the mixing engineers were aware of Timbaland and Furtado's rock influences, the songs were mixed on a mixing board in the studio instead of "the fancy mixer at the end". Furtado said she preferred the louder volume that process gave to the album because she wanted it to sound like her demo tapes, which she prefers to her finished albums. She said, "It didn't have that final wash over it; it didn't have the final pressing at the end, save for a couple sounds".

== Music and lyrics ==
Furtado said that with the release of her albums before Loose, she had wanted to prove herself as a musician and earn respect from listeners through using many different instruments on an album, which most hip-hop musicians did not do. After she believed she had accomplished that, she felt she had freedom to make the type of music she "really love[d]". Furtado's problem with hip-hop was that she did not think it was good enough to base one of her albums on, though she later asked herself why she was being "pretentious". The album represents her separating from such notions and in her words, "jumping in the deep end of the pool—'Ahh, screw it, this is fun!'". Furtado said she considers herself "all over the map" and promiscuous musically because she is not faithful to only one style.

For the first time, Furtado worked with a variety of record producers and followed a more collaborative approach in creating the album. Produced primarily by Timbaland and Danja, Loose showcases Furtado experimenting with a more R&B–hip-hop sound and, as she put it, the "surreal, theatrical elements of '80s music". She has categorized the album's sound as "punk-hop", which she describes as Eurythmics-influenced "modern, poppy, spooky music" and stated that "there's a mysterious, after-midnight vibe to [it] that's extremely visceral."

Furtado has described the album as "more urban, more American, more hip-hop, [and] more simplified" than her earlier work, which she said was more layered and textured because she "tend[s] to overthink things." In contrast, during her studio time with Timbaland, she said she was "in the VIP boys club of just letting go" and being more impulsive. According to Furtado, instead of "pristine stuff," the album features "really raw" elements such as distorted bass lines, laughter from studio outtakes and general "room for error." Furtado has said Loose is not as much about the lyrics, which are not included in the liner notes, as it is about "indulging in pleasures—whether it's dancing or lovemaking." According to her, she wasn't trying to be sexy with the album—"I think I just am sexy now," she said.

Loose is primarily a pop album with influences of dance, reggaeton, Latin pop, hip hop, synth pop, Middle Eastern music, R&B, new wave, funk, and trip hop.

== Songs ==
The opening track, "Afraid" (featuring rapper Attitude), depicts Furtado's fear of what people think of her; she has said that the chorus reminds her of "walking down the hall in high school ... because you live from the outside in. Now that I'm an adult, I care about the inside of me ... Before I said I didn't care about what people thought about me, but I really did."

"Maneater" is an uptempo electro rock song that combines 1980s electro synths and a more dance-oriented beat. The song has prominent electropop and synth-pop influences and is lyrically related to how people become "hot on themselves" when dancing in their underwear in front of a mirror. "Promiscuous" (featuring Timbaland) was inspired by a flirting exchange Furtado had with Attitude, who co-wrote the song.

She has characterized the fifth track, "Showtime", as "a proper R&B slow jam". "No Hay Igual" is a hip-hop and reggaeton song that features a Spanglish tongue twister over "future-tropic" beats. The song contains a "sharp mix" of percussion and "empowered chanting". In the track, Furtado sings in Spanish and raps in Portuguese over a reggaeton rhythm.

The album also features more introspective songs; The Sunday Times wrote that it "has a surprising sadness to it." The seventh track, "Te Busqué", which features Juanes, is about Furtado's experiences with depression, which she said she has had periodically since she was around seventeen years old. Furtado said she was unsure what "Say It Right" is about, but that it encapsulates her feeling when she wrote it and "taps into this other sphere"; in an interview for The Sunday Times, it was mentioned that it is about her breakup with DJ Jasper Gahunia. "In God's Hands" was also inspired by the end of their relationship.

== Release and promotion ==
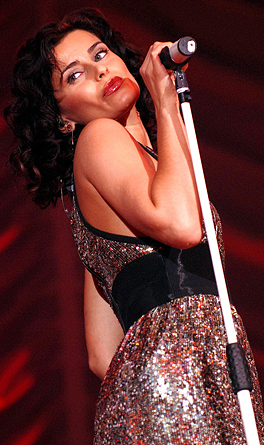
Furtado performing in 2007.

The album was first released in Japan on June 7, 2006, through Universal Music Group before being released two days later in Germany. In the United Kingdom, Loose was released on June 12, 2006, via Geffen Records, and was released eight days later on June 20, 2006, in Canada and the United States.

During the promotion of Loose, Furtado performed at major music festivals and award shows. In Europe, she appeared at Rock am Ring and Rock im Park in Germany and the Pinkpop Festival in the Netherlands in June 2006. She performed in Canada at the Calgary Stampede and the Ottawa Bluesfest in July, and at the Ovation Music Festival in September. Shortly after her August 2006 performance at the Summer Sonic in Japan, she sang at the Teen Choice Awards. In November, she performed during the World Music Awards, the American Music Awards, and the 94th Grey Cup halftime show. She also performed at the 2007 NRJ Music Awards in January.

Furtado embarked on a world concert tour, the Get Loose Tour, on February 16, 2007, in the UK; the tour included thirty-one dates in Europe and Canada, with additional shows in the US, Japan, Australia, and Latin America. Furtado described the show as a "full sensory experience" with "a beginning, middle and end ... [it] takes you on a journey", also stressing the importance of crowd involvement and "spontaneity and rawness, because those are my roots, you know? I started by doing club shows, and that's the energy I love, the raw club energy of just feeling like you're rocking out." Though Furtado said choreographed dance routines were to be included in the show, she described it as "music-based ... Everything else is just to keep it sophisticated and sensual and fun." Furtado said she hoped to have Chris Martin, Juanes, Justin Timberlake, Timbaland, and Calle 13 guest on the tour, and planned a "revolving door" of opening acts with Latin musicians opening in the US.

On June 4, 2021, Furtado released a digital reissue of the album to celebrate its 15th anniversary. This expanded edition of Loose featured a selection of rare remixes and bonus tracks, including a version of "Do It" featuring Missy Elliott, and Spanish-language versions of "All Good Things (Come to an End)", "In God's Hands", and "Te Busqué". The track list also includes 12 remixes, such as three different versions of "Promiscuous" by Axwell, Crossroads Vegas, and Josh Desi, and an alternate version of "Say It Right" dubbed the "Reggae Main Mix", featuring Courtney John.

On September 4, 2026, Furtado released another digital reissue of the album to commemorate its 20th anniversary. This special deluxe edition of Loose includes 10 bonus tracks. The first four are reimagined versions of "Maneater", "Promiscuous", "All Good Things (Come to an End)", and "Say It Right", featuring American pianist Adam Tendler. The next four are previously unreleased demos from Loose sessions: "Move Me", "I Am" (previously leaked before the original album release), "Weak" and a secret demo version of “All Good Things (Come to an End)”, which includes Chris Martin's vocals. And the last two are newly recorded songs: "Te Lo Doy", featuring Colombian Canadian singer-songwriter Lido Pimienta and Puerto Rican rapper Villano Antillano, and "Gaslight". Furtado first mentioned "Gaslight" in an interview on the Call Her Daddy podcast in 2024, revealing that she planned to include it on the deluxe edition of her seventh studio album 7, which finally hasn't been released.

== Singles ==
In April 2006, a remix of "No Hay Igual" featuring the band Calle 13 was issued as a club single in the United States. During the same period, "Promiscuous" (featuring Timbaland) was released for digital download in North America. It became Furtado's first single to top the US Billboard Hot 100 and reached the top five in Australia. The lead single in Europe and Latin America, "Maneater", was released in late May 2006. It became Furtado's first number-one single on the UK Singles Chart and reached the top five in Germany, Austria, and Switzerland.

The second single in Europe, "Promiscuous", was released in September 2006. It peaked at number three in the UK and reached the top ten in Germany. During the same period, "Maneater" was released as the second single in North America, where it peaked at number 16 on the Hot 100 and number two in Canada.

Releases of the third North American single, "Say It Right", and the third European single, "All Good Things (Come to an End)", occurred in late 2006. "Say It Right" became Furtado's second number-one hit in the US and topped the charts in seven other countries, including France and New Zealand. "All Good Things (Come to an End)" reached number one in over 15 countries, including Germany, Austria, and the Netherlands, and peaked at number four in the UK.

The album's fifth and final UK single was "In God's Hands", released in July 2007, while "Do It" served as the final North American single that same month. "Te Busqué" was released as the lead single in Spain due to the limited local success of hip-hop influenced tracks at the time. Though not officially released as a single in the US, "Te Busqué" reached the top 40 on the Billboard Latin Pop Airplay chart.

== Critical reception ==
Professional ratings
Aggregate scores
Source	Rating
Metacritic	71/100
Review scores
Source	Rating
AllMusic	4.5/5 stars
Blender	4/5 stars
Entertainment Weekly	B−
The Guardian	4/5 stars
NME	8/10
Pitchfork	6.4/10
Q	3/5 stars
Rolling Stone	3/5 stars
Spin	4/5 stars
The Village Voice	B

Loose received generally positive reviews from music critics; it holds an average score of 71 out of 100 at aggregate website Metacritic. AllMusic and musicOMH cited the "revitalising" effect of Timbaland on Furtado's music, and The Guardian called it "slick, smart and surprising." Q found most of it to be "an inventive, hip-hop-inflected delight."

Kelefa Sanneh of The New York Times wrote that "the music and the lyrics are mainly aimed at dance floors, and yet this album keeps reminding listeners that a dance floor is one of the most complicated places on earth." In its review, AllMusic noted, "Timbaland has revitalized Nelly Furtado both creatively and commercially with Loose". She won her first BRIT Award—Best International Female—in 2007.

In a mixed review, Nick Catucci of The Village Voice felt that Furtado "sauces up a bit too luridly" and lacks "chemistry" with Timbaland, writing that Loose "isn't a love child, but a bump-and-grind that never finds a groove". Vibe stated she "loses herself in Gwen Stefani–like posturing" on tracks like "Glow". In his consumer guide for The Village Voice, Robert Christgau gave the album a "B" and named it "Dud of the Month", indicating "a bad record whose details rarely merit further thought."

== Commercial performance ==
Loose debuted at number one on the Canadian Albums Chart, selling more than 34,000 copies in its first week; at the time, it was the year's strongest debut for a Canadian artist. In late July, after Furtado embarked on a short tour of Canada and appeared on Canadian Idol, the album returned to number one. It stayed near the top of the chart until late January 2007, when it reached number one again for two weeks. It was the third best-selling album of 2006 in Canada, and the highest selling by a female solo artist, with 291,700 copies sold. The Canadian Recording Industry Association (CRIA) certified Loose five times platinum in May 2007 for shipments of more than 500,000 copies. It stayed in the top twenty for fifty-seven weeks.

The album debuted at number one on the US Billboard 200, making it Furtado's first album to top the chart, with first-week sales of 219,000 copies. On the issue dated July 8, 2006, "Promiscuous" reached number one on the US Billboard Hot 100, resulting in Furtado simultaneously topping both the albums and singles charts. The album was certified platinum by the Recording Industry Association of America (RIAA) and ranked 64th on the Billboard 2006 year-end chart. Loose exited the US top ten in August 2006 but re-entered in March 2007, and by October 2007, it had sold two million units in the US. The album ranked 64th and 32nd on the Billboard year-end charts for 2006 and 2007, respectively.

In the United Kingdom, Loose entered the albums chart at number five; in its 43rd week, it reached a peak of number four. It was certified double platinum for shipments of more than 600,000 copies. As of July 2007, it had sold approximately 827,000 copies in the UK.

== Controversy ==
Considerable attention was generated by the more sexual image of Furtado presented in promotion and publicity for the album, particularly in the music videos for "Promiscuous" and "Maneater", in which she dances around with her midriff exposed. According to Maclean's magazine, some said that Furtado's progression was a natural transformation of a pop singer; others believed that she had "sold out" in an effort to garner record sales, particularly after her second album was a commercial failure in comparison to her first. Maclean's wrote that her makeover "seems a bit forced" and contrasted her with singers such as Madonna and Emily Haines of Metric: "[they] seem to be completely in control, even somewhat intimidating in their sexuality: they've made a calculated decision for commercial and feminist reasons. In contrast, Furtado's new, overt sexuality comes off as unoriginal—overdone by thousands of pouty pop stars with a quarter of Furtado's natural talent ... the revamping feels as if it's been imposed rather than chosen by the unique, articulate singer we've seen in the past."

Dose magazine wrote that Furtado's new "highly sexualized" image was manufactured, and noted the involvement in the album's development of Geffen's Jimmy Iovine, who helped to develop the Pussycat Dolls, a girl group known for their sexually suggestive dance routines. The writer also criticised Furtado's discussion of her buttocks and apparent rejection of feminism in a Blender magazine interview, writing: "Girls, do you hear that churning? Those are the ideas of Gloria Steinem turning in their grave." A writer for the CBC said that cynics could attribute Furtado's commercial success with Loose to her "amped-up sex appeal." The writer added that, the failure of Janet Jackson's album Damita Jo (2004) indicated such a move was not infallible. Furtado was "still demure compared to many of her competitors"—she avoided sporting lingerie or performing "Christina Aguilera-style gyrations or calisthenics" in the "Promiscuous" and "Maneater" videos. "Despite its dramatic arrival ... Furtado's new image doesn’t feel calculated", he said. "[She] seems to be thinking less and feeling more, to the benefit of her music."

However, a 2015 retrospective review of the album by Adria Young for Vice noted that, "When Loose's second single 'Promiscuous' started its 24-hour rotations across Canada, Furtado was immediately and notably one of the first Canadian artists to experience public slut-shaming." Young further contends that, "the media also focused on bullshit like the kind of 'example' [Furtado] was setting, the 'tarting up' of a Canadian good-girl, romantic relationships between her and producers, her sexual orientation, her clothing, her 'midriff' and all kinds of superficial, sexist crap that had nothing to do with her music, what her music meant or what strength it might give to other women struggling with the very same gender dichotomies and double-standards around sexuality that the album was trying to explore."

In early 2007, a video hosted on YouTube led to reports that the song "Do It", and the Timbaland-produced ringtone "Block Party" that inspired it, used—without authorization—the melody from Finnish demoscene musician Janne "Tempest" Suni's song "Acidjazzed Evening", winner of the Assembly 2000 oldskool music competition. Timbaland used the record of C64 adaptation of the song written by Glenn Rune Gallefoss (GRG). Timbaland admitted sampling the song, but said that he had no time to research its intellectual owner. Hannu Sormunen, a Finnish representative of Universal which represents Nelly Furtado in Finland, commented the controversy as follows on January 15, 2007, issue of Iltalehti; "In case that the artist decides to pursue the matter further, it's on him to go to America and confront them with the local use of law. It will require a considerable amount of faith and, of course, money." On February 9, 2007, Timbaland commented on the issue in an MTV interview: "It makes me laugh. The part I don't understand, the dude is trying to act like I went to his house and took it from his computer. I don't know him from a can of paint. I'm 15 years deep. That's how you attack a king? You attack moi? Come on, man. You got to come correct. You the laughing stock. People are like, 'You can't be serious.'"

On June 12, 2009, Mikko Välimäki, who is one of the legal counsels of Kernel Records, the owner of the sound recording rights, reported that the case had been filed in Florida. In January 2008, Turkish newspapers reported that Kalan Müzik, the record label that released Turkish folk singer Muhlis Akarsu's album Ya Dost Ya Dost, pressed charges against Furtado for the Loose track "Wait for You", which label officials said features the bağlama instrumental part of Akarsu's song "Allah Allah Desem Gelsem".

== Track listing ==
Loose
No.	Title	Writer(s)	Producer(s)	Length
1.	"Afraid" (featuring Attitude)	Nelly Furtado; Tim Mosley; Nate Hills; Timothy "Attitude" Clayton	Timbaland; Danja; Jim Beanz^{[a]}	3:35
2.	"Maneater"	Furtado; Mosley; Hills; Beanz	Timbaland; Danja; Beanz^{[a]}	4:25
3.	"Promiscuous" (featuring Timbaland)	Clayton; Mosley; Furtado; Hills	Timbaland; Danja; Beanz^{[a]}	4:02
4.	"Glow"	Furtado; Mosley; Hills; Nisan Stewart	Timbaland; Danja; Beanz^{[a]}	4:02
5.	"Showtime"	Furtado; Hills	Danja; Beanz^{[a]}	4:16
6.	"No Hay Igual"	Furtado; Mosley; Hills; Stewart	Timbaland; Danja; Stewart; Beanz^{[a]}	3:36
7.	"Te Busqué" (featuring Juanes)	Furtado; Juanes; Lester Mendez	Mendez	3:38
8.	"Say It Right"	Furtado; Mosley; Hills	Timbaland; Danja; Beanz^{[a]}	3:43
9.	"Do It"	Furtado; Mosley; Hills	Timbaland; Danja; Beanz^{[a]}	3:42
10.	"In God's Hands"	Furtado; Rick Nowels	Nowels; Furtado	4:54
11.	"Wait for You"	Furtado; Mosley; Hills	Timbaland; Danja; Beanz^{[a]}	5:11
12.	"All Good Things (Come to an End)"	Furtado; Mosley; Chris Martin; Hills	Timbaland; Danja; Beanz^{[a]}	5:11
13.	"Te Busqué" (Spanish version) (featuring Juanes)	Furtado; Juanes; Mendez	Mendez	3:39
Total length:				53:54

Expanded edition
No.	Title	Writer(s)	Producer(s)	Length
17.	"Let My Hair Down"	Furtado; Gerald Eaton; Brian West	Track and Field; Neal H Pogue	3:38
18.	"Somebody to Love"	Furtado; Nowels	Nowels; Furtado	4:56
19.	"Undercover"	Furtado; Mendez	Mendez	3:55
20.	"What I Wanted"	Furtado; Mendez	Mendez	3:56
21.	"Runaway"	Furtado; Nowels	Furtado; Nowels	4:16
22.	"Crazy" (Radio 1 Live Lounge Session)	Brian Burton; Thomas Callaway; Gian Franco Reverberi; Gian Piero Reverberi		3:23
23.	"Do It" (featuring Missy Elliott)	Furtado; Mosley; Hills; Melissa Elliott	Timbaland; Danja; Beanz^{[a]}	3:26
24.	"Lo Bueno Siempre Tiene un Final"	Furtado; Mosley; Martin; Hills; Julio Reyes Copello	Timbaland; Danja; Beanz^{[a]}	4:24
25.	"En las Manos de Dios"	Furtado; Nowels; Copello; Jimena Romero	Nowels; Furtado	4:13
26.	"In God's Hands" (featuring Keith Urban)		Nowels; Furtado	4:34
27.	"Say It Right" (Reggae Main Mix) (featuring Courtney John)		Yogie; Beanz^{[a]}	4:00
28.	"No Hay Igual" (featuring Calle 13)	Furtado; Mosley; Hills; Stewart; René Pérez	Timbaland; Danja; Stewart; Beanz^{[a]}	3:39
29.	"Promiscuous" (Axwell Remix) (featuring Timbaland)		Timbaland; Danja; Beanz^{[a]}; Axwell^{[b]}	6:01
30.	"Promiscuous" (Crossroads Vegas Mix) (featuring Timbaland and Mr. Vegas)		Timbaland; Danja; Beanz^{[a]}; Yogie^{[b]}	3:53
31.	"Promiscuous" (The Josh Desi Remix) (featuring Timbaland)		Timbaland; Danja; Beanz^{[a]}; Josh^{[b]}	4:28
32.	"All Good Things (Come to an End)" (Nelly Furtado x Quarterhead Remix)		Timbaland; Danja; Beanz^{[a]}; Quarterhead^{[b]}	3:05

Deluxe edition
No.	Title	Writer(s)	Producer(s)	Length
19.	"Say It Right" (Climax version) (featuring Adam Tendler)		Furtado; Tendler	5:43
20.	"Promiscuous" (Baddie version) (featuring Adam Tendler)		Furtado; Tendler	5:51
21.	"Maneater" (Ritual version) (featuring Adam Tendler)		Furtado; Tendler	7:21
22.	"All Good Things (Come to an End)" (Midlife version) (featuring Adam Tendler)		Furtado; Tendler	7:24
23.	"Move Me" (2005 demo)	Furtado	Furtado	4:04
24.	"I Am" (2005 demo)	Nowels; Furtado	Nowels	4:13
25.	"Weak" (2005 demo)	Furtado; Eaton; West	Track and Field	3:19
26.	"All Good Things (Come to an End)" (2006 Secret demo version)		Timbaland; Danja	5:01
27.	"Te Lo Doy" (featuring Villano Antillano and Lido Pimienta)	Furtado; Antillano; Pimienta; Francis Ubiera; Michael Kuzoian; Dan Garcia; Lenard Antonio Rodriguez; Oscar Sanchez	Steel Sessions	2:46
28.	"Gaslight"	Beanz; Furtado; Drew Veloric; Pimienta	Beanz	3:10

=== Notes ===
- ^{^[a]} signifies a vocal producer
- ^{^[b]} signifies an additional producer
- Digital editions (both standard and expanded) include respective interludes before "Promiscuous", "No Hay Igual", and "Wait for You" as separate tracks.
- On Canadian CD pressings, a message from Furtado appears as a hidden track between tracks 12 and 13.
- Track 13 originally appeared as a bonus track on North American pressings. It was also included on Spanish and select South American pressings, where it swapped places with track 7. The track was later included on several international reissues, and on all vinyl pressings.
- Track 18 originally replaced track 13 on international editions, and later on the digital reissue.
- Track 17 originally appeared on UK and Japanese editions, and later on the digital reissue.
- Track 20 originally appeared on French and Japanese editions.
- Track 19 originally appeared on the North American iTunes Store edition.
- Portuguese exclusive edition pressings include a remix of "Maneater" featuring Da Weasel, and Rádio Comercial performances of "All Good Things (Come to an End)" and "Maneater".
- Brazilian special edition pressings include a remix of "All Good Things (Come to an End)" featuring Di Ferrero.
- Target-exclusive edition pressings include a bonus DVD containing the music video for "Maneater" and behind-the-scenes footage, alongside track 21.
- International tour edition pressings include a bonus disc containing tracks 13, 17, 19, 21, 22, and 28, alongside a remix of "All Good Things (Come to an End)" featuring Rea Garvey, and live performances of "Maneater" and "Promiscuous". (Note: The live performance of "Promiscuous" featured a guest appearance by Saukrates.)
- Limited summer edition pressings include tracks 13, 24, and 25, alongside "Dar". Spanish special edition additionally includes track 28.
- French Mixes & Remixes limited edition pressings include a bonus disc containing nine remixes.

== Personnel ==
Credits are adapted from the liner notes of Loose.

- Nelly Furtado – lead vocals, songwriting, executive producer, producer
- Timbaland – vocals, writing, bass guitar, drums, keyboard, percussion, executive producer, producer, vocal assistance
- Attitude – writing
- Rusty Anderson – acoustic guitar
- David Campbell – conductor
- Roberto Cani – violin
- Josefina Vergara – violin
- Peter Kent – violin
- Amen Garabedian – violin
- Maria DeLeon – violin
- Geraldo Hilera – violin
- Sharon Jackson – violin
- Joel Derouin – violin
- Luis Conte – percussion
- Daniel Stone – percussion
- Taku Hirano – percussion
- David Schommer – percussion
- Luis Orbego – percussion
- Danja – drums, keyboards, piano, producer
- Hilario Durán – piano
- Dean Jarvis – bass guitar
- Juanes – acoustic guitar, electric guitar
- Suzie Katayama – cello
- Larry Corbett – cello
- Steve Richards – cello
- Greg Kurstin – keyboards
- Jamie Muhoberac – keyboards
- Rick Nowels – guitar, keyboards, piano, producer
- Blake O – guitar
- Dan Warner – guitar
- Kevin Rudolf – guitar
- Ramón Stagnaro – acoustic guitar, electric guitar
- Nisan Stewart – drums, producer
- Joey Waronker – drums
- Lester Mendez – producer
- Jim Beanz – vocal producer, vocal assistance
- The Horace Mann Middle School Choirs – vocal assistance
- Thom Panunzio – executive producer, A&R
- Demacio Castellón – engineer, mixing
- Vadim Chislov – engineer
- Ben Jost – engineer
- Joao R. Názario – engineer
- James Roach – engineer
- Kobia Tetey – engineer
- Joe Wohlmuth – engineer
- Jason Donkersgoed – assistant engineer
- Steve Genwick – assistant engineer
- Kieron Menzies – assistant engineer
- Dean Reid – assistant engineer
- Marcella Araica – mixing
- Brad Haehnel – mixing
- Dave Pensado – mixing
- Neal H. Pogue – mixing
- Chris Gehringer – mastering
- D.J. Mormile – A&R
- Evan Peters – A&R coordination
- Jeanne Venton – A&R administration
- JP Robinson – art direction
- Gravillis Inc. – art direction
- Nevis – art direction
- Anthony Mandler – photography
- Cliff Feiman – production manager

== Charts ==
=== Weekly charts ===
2006–2007 weekly chart performance
Chart	Peak position
Australian Albums (ARIA)	4
Australian Urban Albums (ARIA)	1
Austrian Albums (Ö3 Austria)	1
Belgian Albums (Ultratop Flanders)	1
Belgian Albums (Ultratop Wallonia)	6
Canadian Albums (Billboard)	1
Croatian International Albums (HDU)	1
Czech Albums (ČNS IFPI)	2
Danish Albums (Hitlisten)	4
Dutch Albums (Album Top 100)	2
European Top 100 Albums (Billboard)	1
Finnish Albums (Suomen virallinen lista)	4
French Albums (SNEP)	5
German Albums (Offizielle Top 100)	1
Greek Albums (IFPI Greece)	2
Hungarian Albums (MAHASZ)	1
Irish Albums (IRMA)	2
Italian Albums (FIMI)	3
Japanese Albums (Oricon)	42
Mexican Albums (Top 100 Mexico)	66
New Zealand Albums (RMNZ)	1
Norwegian Albums (VG-lista)	4
Polish Albums (ZPAV)	1
Portuguese Albums (AFP)	3
Scottish Albums (Official Charts)	7
South African Albums (RISA)	3
Spanish Albums (Promusicae)	12
Swedish Albums (Sverigetopplistan)	6
Swiss Albums (Schweizer Hitparade)	1
Taiwanese Albums (Five Music)	7
UK Albums (Official Charts)	4
US Billboard 200	1

=== Year-end charts ===
2006 year-end chart performance
Chart	Position
Australian Albums (ARIA)	44
Austrian Albums (Ö3 Austria)	36
Belgian Albums (Ultratop Flanders)	69
Dutch Albums (Album Top 100)	60
European Top 100 Albums (Billboard)	13
French Albums (SNEP)	148
German Albums (Offizielle Top 100)	11
Greek International Albums (IFPI)	39
Italian Albums (FIMI)	62
Swiss Albums (Schweizer Hitparade)	9
UK Albums (OCC)	39
US Billboard 200	64
Worldwide Albums (IFPI)	13

2007 year-end chart performance
Chart	Position
Australian Albums (ARIA)	25
Austrian Albums (Ö3 Austria)	3
Belgian Albums (Ultratop Flanders)	8
Belgian Albums (Ultratop Wallonia)	14
Dutch Albums (Album Top 100)	11
European Top 100 Albums (Billboard)	1
Finnish Albums (Suomen virallinen lista)	13
French Albums (SNEP)	19
German Albums (Offizielle Top 100)	1
Hungarian Albums (MAHASZ)	5
Irish Albums (IRMA)	13
Italian Albums (FIMI)	14
New Zealand Albums (RMNZ)	18
Swedish Albums (Sverigetoplistan)	13
Swiss Albums (Schweizer Hitparade)	1
UK Albums (OCC)	14
US Billboard 200	32
Worldwide Albums (IFPI)	13

2008 year-end chart performance
Chart	Position
Belgian Midprice Albums (Ultratop Flanders)	16
Belgian Midprice Albums (Ultratop Wallonia)	27
European Top 100 Albums (Billboard)	87
German Albums (Offizielle Top 100)	60
UK Albums (OCC)	193

2021 year-end chart performance
Chart	Position
Belgian Albums (Ultratop Flanders)	187

2022 year-end chart performance
Chart	Position
Belgian Albums (Ultratop Flanders)	143

2023 year-end chart performance
Chart	Position
Belgian Albums (Ultratop Flanders)	121

2024 year-end chart performance
Chart	Position
Belgian Albums (Ultratop Flanders)	107

2025 year-end chart performance
Chart	Position
Belgian Albums (Ultratop Flanders)	68
Belgian Albums (Ultratop Wallonia)	134
German Albums (Offizielle Top 100)	59
Hungarian Albums (MAHASZ)	72
Swedish Albums (Sverigetopplistan)	88
Swiss Albums (Schweizer Hitparade)	58

== Certifications ==
Certifications and sales
Region	Certification	Certified units/sales
Australia (ARIA)	2× Platinum	140,000^{^}
Austria (IFPI Austria)	2× Platinum	60,000^{*}
Belgium (BRMA)	2× Platinum	100,000^{*}
Brazil (Pro-Música Brasil)	Gold	30,000^{*}
Canada (Music Canada)	6× Platinum	600,000^{‡}
Denmark (IFPI Danmark)	4× Platinum	80,000^{‡}
Finland (Musiikkituottajat)	Gold	18,800
France (SNEP)	Platinum	200,000^{*}
Germany (BVMI)	6× Platinum	1,200,000^{‡}
Greece (IFPI Greece)	Gold	7,500^{^}
Hungary (MAHASZ)	2× Platinum	20,000^{^}
Ireland (IRMA)	Platinum	15,000^{^}
Italy (FIMI)	Gold	205,400 (Note: By December 2007, Loose had sold 180,400 units in Italy. In 2025, the album was certified gold by Federazione Industria Musicale Italiana (FIMI) for album-equivalent units of 25,000 since 2009, pushing the album's sales total to 205,400 in the country.)
Mexico (AMPROFON)	Gold	50,000^{^}
Netherlands (NVPI)	Platinum	70,000^{^}
New Zealand (RMNZ)	4× Platinum	60,000^{‡}
Norway (IFPI Norway)	Platinum	40,000^{*}
Poland (ZPAV)	Diamond	100,000^{*}
Portugal (AFP)	2× Platinum	40,000^{^}
Romania (UFPR)	3× Platinum	
Russia (NFPF)	7× Platinum	140,000^{*}
Singapore (RIAS)	Gold	5,000^{*}
Spain (Promusicae)	Gold	40,000^{^}
Sweden (GLF)	Gold	30,000^{^}
Switzerland (IFPI Switzerland)	5× Platinum	150,000^{^}
United Kingdom (BPI)	4× Platinum	1,200,000^{‡}
United States (RIAA)	3× Platinum	3,000,000^{‡}
Summaries
Europe (IFPI)	3× Platinum	3,000,000^{*}
Worldwide	—	10,000,000
^{*} Sales figures based on certification alone.^{^} Shipments figures based on certification alone.^{‡} Sales+streaming figures based on certification alone.

== Release history ==
Release dates and formats
Region	Date	Edition(s)	Format(s)	Label(s)	Ref.
Japan	June 7, 2006	Standard	CD	Universal	
New Zealand	June 8, 2006	Standard	CD	Universal	
Germany	June 9, 2006	Standard	CD	Universal	
Argentina	June 12, 2006	Standard	CD	Universal	
United Kingdom	June 12, 2006	Standard	CD	Polydor	
Sweden	June 14, 2006	Standard	CD	Universal	
Canada	June 20, 2006	Standard	CD; digital download	Universal	
United States	June 20, 2006	Standard	CD; digital download; vinyl	Geffen	
France	June 26, 2006	Standard	CD	Polydor	
Australia	July 8, 2006	Standard	CD	Universal	
Portugal	December 12, 2006	Exclusive	CD	Universal	
Portugal	March 1, 2007	International tour	Double CD	Universal	
Germany	March 2, 2007	International tour	Double CD	Universal	
Sweden	March 5, 2007	International tour	Double CD	Universal	
New Zealand	March 12, 2007	International tour	Double CD	Universal	
Canada	March 20, 2007	International tour	Double CD	Universal	
Germany	July 13, 2007	Limited summer	CD	Universal	
Spain	September 4, 2007	Special	CD	Universal	
France	November 26, 2007	Mixes & Remixes	Double CD	Polydor	
Various	June 4, 2021	Expanded	Digital download; streaming	Geffen	
Various	December 1, 2023	Standard	Vinyl (Note: Loose was made available in two vinyl variants.)	Geffen; UM^{e}	
Various	September 4, 2026	Deluxe	Digital download; streaming	Geffen	

== See also ==
- Nelly Furtado discography
- List of number-one albums of 2006 (Canada)
- List of number-one albums of 2007 (Canada)
- List of number-one hits of 2006 (Germany)
- List of number-one hits of 2007 (Germany)
- List of number-one albums of 2007 (Poland)
- List of Billboard 200 number-one albums of 2006
- List of best-selling albums by women
- List of best-selling albums of the 21st century
- List of best-selling albums in Germany
- List of certified albums in Romania
