= Say It Right =

2006 single by Nelly Furtado

Single by Nelly Furtado

from the album Loose
- B-side: "Maneater"; "What I Wanted"
- Released: October 31, 2006
- Studio: Hit Factory Criteria (Miami)
- Length: 3:43
- Label: Geffen; Mosley
- Songwriters: Nelly Furtado; Timbaland; Nate Hills
- Producers: Timbaland; Danja

Nelly Furtado singles chronology
"Maneater" (2006)	"Say It Right" (2006)	"All Good Things (Come to an End)" (2006)

Music video
- "Say It Right" on YouTube

"Say It Right" is a song by Canadian singer Nelly Furtado from her third studio album, Loose (2006). It was written by Furtado, Tim "Timbaland" Mosley, and Nate "Danja" Hills, with Furtado crediting the Eurythmics' song "Here Comes the Rain Again" as her inspiration. The song was released as the third single from Loose on 31 October 2006, by Geffen Records and Mosley Music Group; in Europe, it was released as the fourth.

"Say It Right" attained worldwide success, topping the charts in the United States, New Zealand, and numerous European countries. The accompanying music video for the song, directed by Rankin & Chris, features Furtado singing in various locations. The song has been performed on a number of live appearances by Furtado, including her third headlining Get Loose Tour. It received a Grammy Award nomination for Best Female Pop Vocal Performance at the 50th Annual Grammy Awards (2008) but lost to Amy Winehouse's "Rehab".

In March 2026, "Say It Right" surpassed one billion streams on music platform Spotify.

== Background and writing ==
The process of creating the song began in the recording studio one morning at around 4:00 am, when Timbaland recommended that Furtado should go home because she was tired. Furtado, who had heard that the band U2 (a band she says she deeply admires) wrote many of their songs in the studio control room, said "Really? I'll show you", put on her hoodie and began to "jam". Nate Hills and Timbaland soon joined her, writing and producing as they went, and according to Furtado, this process intensified as she sang. The team used four microphones in the live room and moved them around during recording, about which Furtado said, "...when you listen to it—there's a lot of dimension. It kind of sounds like [Timbaland is] in another country." Afterwards, they picked the best vocals and "perfected" them, before inserting "reverbs and weird alien sounds" onto them. "[W]e experimented a lot with depth and different sounds," Furtado said of the making of the song. "[It] affected my vocals a whole lot."

"Say It Right" is performed with a moderate techno groove and is written in F minor. It is set in common time; in 4/4 count. The chord progression is Fm–E♭–D♭–B♭m. Furtado's vocal range spans from A♭_{3} to F_{5}. Furtado has cited the "spooky, keyboard-driven pop sound" of the band Eurythmics, particularly their 1983 song "Here Comes the Rain Again", as an influence on "Say It Right" and other tracks on Loose. "I'm not 100 percent sure what ["Here Comes the Rain Again" is] about, but it always takes me away to another place, and I love it", she said. The song focuses on mystic or transcendental experiences, as Furtado explained in a 2007 interview, "It is a kind of a magical song. It has a mystery to it, that I have not quite figured out. It has a haunting twist to it."

In other interviews Furtado said that she does not really know what "Say It Right" is about, "but it captures the feeling I had when I wrote it, and it taps into this other sphere." The song was played during the Miss Universe 2007 Introductory Ceremony, the 2006 American Music Awards, and Concert for Diana.

== Critical reception ==
Billboard magazine called the song "a Pussycat Dolls-inspired contempo jam, high on hooks and of-the-moment production. Well done, if in the most generic sense." About.com's Bill Lamb gave the song 4/5 stars, saying that with "Say It Right", "many pop music fans are likely to take a second look at purchasing [Loose]". He described the song as "the foundation of Loose" and "a welcomed presence in the pop top 40". IGN Music calls the song "...one of the brightest moments on the album" and "another throwback to the '80s" which "...lets loose with the most hypnotic chorus". AllMusic's Stephen Thomas Erlewine considered the song "a dark meditative piece that would have fit on [Furtado's] previous records".

The New York Times described the song as "building a groove from hard drums and ghostly, multitracked voices, and Ms. Furtado sings a melancholy chorus she doesn't quite believe", comparing the coda, with music getting louder and then slowly fading, "the way the best—and worst—nights out often do". Also, DJ Z's reviewed the song as "the only single in the world to work at both a club in Manhattan, and on a safari through the natives land of (fill in the blank)." The song received a nomination for Best Female Pop Vocal Performance at the 50th Annual Grammy Awards, losing to Amy Winehouse's "Rehab". It was also nominated for two MuchMusic Video Awards.

== Chart performance ==
In the United States, the song was made available for airplay at mainstream contemporary hit radio stations on 30 October 2006. Geffen Records withdrew from radio the second single from Loose, "Maneater", before promoting "Say It Right". The song debuted on the Billboard Bubbling Under Hot 100 Singles chart at number 22 on the issue dated 18 November. It entered the Billboard Hot 100 in late-November at number 93, and it reached number one in its fourteenth week on 24 February 2007, becoming Furtado's second number-one single after "Promiscuous" (2006). The song stayed at number one for one week, in the top 10 for 14 weeks and on the Hot 100 for 30 weeks. "Say It Right" contributed to sales of the album Loose, and was credited as being responsible for its return to the top 10 on the U.S. Billboard 200. According to Nielsen Broadcast Data Systems, "Say It Right" was the second most-played song on U.S. radio in 2007 with 364,000 plays through 2 December, and it was at number four on R&R magazine's 2007 year-end all-format top 100 songs list. On the Billboard Hot 100-year-end chart, it was ranked ninth. The RIAA certified "Say It Right" platinum in December 2007. "Say It Right" peaked at number one for 10 weeks on the Canadian BDS Airplay Chart, which it entered in early December, becoming Furtado's third Canadian number-one single. According to BDS, it was the fourth most-played song of 2007 on Canadian radio, amassing around 56,900 detections.

The song had equal success on Billboard's Canadian Hot 100; it reached number five on unpublished versions of the chart, and debuted when the chart was introduced the week of 2 June 2007. The song remained on the Canadian Hot 100 for over six months after the chart was officially introduced. "Say It Right" peaked at number two for three consecutive weeks on the Australian ARIA Singles Chart, giving Loose a "second wind" on the albums chart, according to the Herald Sun; ARIA accredited it as a platinum single. The single debuted at number 37 on the UK Singles Chart in February 2007, before reaching its peak; ten, a month later, and by doing so, it broke the record for the highest chart placing for a download-only single, after chart regulations were changed to allow songs not accompanied by a physical format to chart. Since then, the record was broken by the band Coldplay with their number-one hit "Viva la Vida". The popularity of "Say It Right" contributed to sales of Loose in the UK, according to Music Week, helping the album reach its highest chart position since its first week of release. The song was the twenty-ninth best-selling single of 2007 in the UK. The song also spent 37 weeks on the UK Singles Chart, twice as long as any other of Furtado's top-40 singles.

In France, the song debuted at number one with 8,100 copies sold on its release, becoming the lowest-selling number one in a week. In Germany, it debuted at number two, where it stayed for nine non-consecutive weeks, behind DJ Ötzi and Nik P.'s "Ein Stern (...der deinen Namen trägt)", which topped the German chart for several months. It became the third-most-successful song of 2007 in Germany. It was the most successful single of 2007 in the European Hit Radio. "Say It Right" is Nelly Furtado's most successful song in Australia, Austria, Romania, Switzerland and Sweden. It is Furtado's second most successful single in Norway, the Netherlands, France (after "All Good Things (Come to an End)"). New Zealand (after "Turn Off the Light") and in the United States (after "Promiscuous").

== Music video ==
The music video for "Say It Right" was directed by British duo Rankin & Chris and filmed in Los Angeles, California in late October 2006. It was shot back-to-back with the video for "All Good Things (Come to an End)", the album's third single in Europe. Furtado called the video her "first action thing" since the video for her 2000 single, "I'm Like a Bird", and said that it featured her experiencing what she called "a total rock-star moment. It's so iconic." The mini-feathered cocktail dress Furtado wears at the opening of the video was designed specifically for her by Australian designer Alex Perry, who said, "It's so cool because she's just undergone a bit of a revamp from what her previous image was; she's become a little more sexy and glamorous."

The clip starts with a helicopter landing on a black helipad, with Furtado's name on the building which is DoubleTree by Hilton Hotel Los Angeles Downtown, with Furtado getting out. Throughout the video, she is shown on the roof of the building, with the Los Angeles skyline in the background. The video features mostly face shots of her and Timbaland interspersed with shots of dancers, under the careful guidance of internationally acclaimed Puerto Rican choreographer Gabriel Rivera.

Furtado described the clip as "a throwback to the '80s ... the more surreal side" because the shots of her and Timbaland reminded her of Annie Lennox and Dave Stewart in videos for Eurythmics' singles, and "the strange relationship [they] had, where ... you get this intense vibe from it. And Tim and me, we're partners, we vibe on a serious creative level, so the video captures that energy." The video ends with Furtado climbing back into the helicopter, which flies off.

The video debuted on MTV's Total Request Live in the U.S. on 6 November 2006, and on Canada's MuchMusic in the week ending 16 November 2006. It reached number nine on the Total Request Live top ten video countdown on 8 November 2006, its first day on the countdown; it returned to the countdown on 14 December 2006, and peaked at number one twice. The video reached number one on the MuchMusic series Countdown for the week ending 16 February 2007. The "Say It Right" video was retired from TRL after spending forty days on the countdown. At the 2007 MTV Video Music Awards, Furtado was nominated for Female Artist of the Year for "Say It Right" and "Maneater". "Say It Right" was nominated for the MuchMoreMusic Award for Best International Video by a Canadian category at the 2007 MuchMusic Video Awards. MTV International certified the "Say It Right" video platinum for more than 6,000 plays on the MTV network. The music video hit 1 billion views on YouTube on 15 May 2024.

== Remixes and covers ==
The official Spanish remix features Jayko. Dummies, Friscia & Lamboy, Menage Music, and Peter Rauhofer produced dance remixes of "Say It Right". Juan Martinez of Universal Music Group, the A&R person who enlisted the producers of the remixes for each single from Loose, said that the "Say It Right" remixes had received "the strongest reaction".

== Track listings ==
- Australian 2-track CD single
1. "Say It Right" (radio edit) – 3:34
2. "Maneater" (Radio 1 Live Lounge session) – 3:00
- European 2-track CD single
1. "Say It Right" (radio edit) – 3:34
2. "What I Wanted" – 3:53
- European CD maxi-single
1. "Say It Right" (radio edit) – 3:34
2. "What I Wanted" – 3:53
3. "Say It Right" (Peter Rauhofer remix part 1) – 8:33
4. "Say It Right" (video)
- Digital download EP (Remixes)
1. "Say It Right" (Peter Rauhofer remix part 1) – 8:33
2. "Say It Right" (Ménage Music remix) – 6:24
3. "Say It Right" (Dummies club mix) – 7:24
4. "Say It Right" (Friscia & Lamboy Electrotribe Mixshow mix) – 9:49

== Credits ==
Credits are adapted from the Loose liner notes.

Technical

- Recorded and mixed at: The Hit Factory Criteria, Miami, Florida

Personnel

- Nelly Furtado – lyrics, vocals, background vocals
- Timbaland – producer, music, drum machine, background vocals
- Danja – producer, music, keyboards
- Kevin Rudolf – guitar
- Jim Beanz – background vocals, vocal production
- Demacio "Demo" Castellon – recording, engineering, mixing
- Marcella "Ms. Lago" Araica – additional recording
- Ben Jost – second engineering
- James Roach – second engineering
- Kobla Tetey – second engineering
- Vadim Chislov – second engineering

== Charts ==
=== Weekly charts ===
2006–2008 weekly chart performance for "Say It Right"
Chart (2006–2008)	Peak position
Australia (ARIA)	2
Australian Urban (ARIA)	1
Austria (Ö3 Austria Top 40)	1
Belgium (Ultratop 50 Flanders)	1
Belgium (Ultratop 50 Wallonia)	1
Canada Digital Song Sales (Billboard)	1
Canada Hot 100 (Billboard)	5 (Note: "Say It Right" had already peaked in popularity when the first issue of the Canadian Hot 100 was released on March 31, 2007.)
Canada AC (Billboard)	10
Canada CHR/Top 40 (Billboard)	1
Canada Hot AC (Billboard)	1
CIS Airplay (TopHit)	5
Croatia International Airplay (Top lista)	1
Czech Republic Airplay (ČNS IFPI)	1
Denmark (Tracklisten)	1
Europe (European Hot 100 Singles)	2
Finland (Suomen virallinen lista)	1
France (SNEP)	1
Germany (GfK)	2
Hungary (Dance Top 40)	3
Hungary (Rádiós Top 40)	1
Ireland (IRMA)	1
Italy (FIMI)	3
Latvia (Latvian Airplay Top 50)	1
Netherlands (Dutch Top 40)	2
Netherlands (Single Top 100)	2
New Zealand (Recorded Music NZ)	1
Norway (VG-lista)	2
Poland (Polish Airplay Top 20)	1
Romania (Romanian Top 100)	1
Russia Airplay (TopHit)	6
Slovakia Airplay (ČNS IFPI)	1
Spain Downloads (PROMUSICAE)	1
Sweden (Sverigetopplistan)	1
Switzerland (Schweizer Hitparade)	1
UK Singles (Official Charts)	10
UK Hip Hop/R&B (Official Charts)	1
Ukraine Airplay (TopHit)	12
US Billboard Hot 100	1
US Adult Contemporary (Billboard)	19
US Adult Pop Airplay (Billboard)	2
US Dance Club Songs (Billboard)	1
US Dance Airplay (Billboard)	1
US Pop Airplay (Billboard)	1
US Rhythmic Airplay (Billboard)	7

2025–2026 weekly chart performance for "Say It Right"
Chart (2025–2026)	Peak position
Greece International (IFPI)	94
Moldova Airplay (TopHit)	26
Romania Airplay (TopHit)	72
Russia Streaming (TopHit)	100

=== Monthly charts ===
2025 monthly chart performance for "Say It Right"
Chart (2025)	Peak position
Moldova Airplay (TopHit)	36

=== Year-end charts ===
2006 year-end chart performance for "Say It Right"
Chart (2006)	Position
Australian Urban (ARIA)	47

2007 year-end chart performance for "Say It Right"
Chart (2007)	Position
Australia (ARIA)	25
Australian Urban (ARIA)	13
Austria (Ö3 Austria Top 40)	6
Belgium (Ultratop 50 Flanders)	17
Belgium (Ultratop 50 Wallonia)	28
Brazil Airplay (Crowley)	26
CIS Airplay (TopHit)	6
Europe (European Hot 100 Singles)	4
Finland (Suomen virallinen lista)	9
France (SNEP)	24
Germany (Media Control GfK)	3
Hungary (Dance Top 40)	10
Hungary (Rádiós Top 40)	2
Italy (FIMI)	29
Netherlands (Dutch Top 40)	4
Netherlands (Single Top 100)	12
New Zealand (RIANZ)	22
Romania (Romanian Top 100)	1
Russia Airplay (TopHit)	6
Sweden (Sverigetopplistan)	36
Switzerland (Schweizer Hitparade)	3
UK Singles (OCC)	29
UK Urban (Music Week)	30
Ukraine Airplay (TopHit)	89
US Billboard Hot 100	9
US Adult Top 40 (Billboard)	9
US Dance Club Play (Billboard)	3
US Hot Dance Airplay (Billboard)	3
US Rhythmic Airplay (Billboard)	36

2008 year-end chart performance for "Say It Right"
Chart (2008)	Position
Spain Downloads (PROMUSICAE)	7
Ukraine Airplay (TopHit)	146

2009 year-end chart performance for "Say It Right"
Chart (2009)	Position
Ukraine Airplay (TopHit)	197

2010 year-end chart performance for "Say It Right"
Chart (2009)	Position
Ukraine Airplay (TopHit)	109

2011 year-end chart performance for "Say It Right"
Chart (2009)	Position
Ukraine Airplay (TopHit)	163

Year-end chart performance
Chart (2024)	Position
Romania Airplay (TopHit)	177

Year-end chart performance
Chart (2025)	Position
CIS Airplay (TopHit)	186
Estonia Airplay (TopHit)	179
Romania Airplay (TopHit)	102

=== Decade-end charts ===
Decade-end chart performance for "Say It Right"
Chart (2000–2009)	Position
Austria (Ö3 Austria Top 40)	39
CIS Airplay (TopHit)	24
Germany (Media Control GfK)	32
Russia Airplay (TopHit)	25

== Certifications ==
Certifications and sales for "Say It Right"
Region	Certification	Certified units/sales
Australia (ARIA)	Platinum	70,000^{^}
Belgium (BRMA)	Gold	25,000^{*}
Brazil (Pro-Música Brasil)	Diamond	250,000^{‡}
Canada (Music Canada)	4× Platinum	320,000^{‡}
Denmark (IFPI Danmark)	Platinum	8,000^{^}
Germany (BVMI)	3× Gold	900,000^{‡}
Italy (FIMI)	Gold	50,000^{‡}
Mexico (AMPROFON)	Platinum	60,000^{‡}
New Zealand (RMNZ)	4× Platinum	120,000^{‡}
Norway (IFPI Norway)	Platinum	10,000^{*}
Spain (Promusicae)	3× Platinum	60,000^{*}
Spain (Promusicae) (since 2015)	Gold	30,000^{‡}
Sweden (GLF)	Gold	10,000^{^}
Switzerland (IFPI Switzerland)	Gold	15,000^{^}
United Kingdom (BPI)	2× Platinum	1,200,000^{‡}
United States (RIAA)	4× Platinum	4,000,000^{‡}
United States (RIAA) Mastertone	Platinum	1,000,000^{*}
Streaming
Greece (IFPI Greece)	2× Platinum	4,000,000^{†}
^{*} Sales figures based on certification alone.^{^} Shipments figures based on certification alone.^{‡} Sales+streaming figures based on certification alone.^{†} Streaming-only figures based on certification alone.

== Release history ==
Release dates and formats for "Say It Right"
Region	Date	Version(s)	Format(s)	Label(s)	Ref.
United States	31 October 2006	Original	Contemporary hit radio	Geffen	
Australia	4 December 2006	Original	CD	Universal Music	
Germany	2 March 2007	Original	CD; maxi CD	Universal Music	
France	21 May 2007	Original	CD	Polydor	
United States	25 March 2022	Sped Up Remix	Digital download; streaming	Universal Music	

== See also ==
- List of Billboard Hot 100 number-one singles of 2007
- List of European number-one hits of 2007
- List of number-one singles from the 2000s (New Zealand)
- List of number-one hits of 2007 (Switzerland)
- List of number-one dance singles of 2007 (U.S.)
- List of Romanian Top 100 number ones of the 2000s
- List of number-one hits of 2007 (France)
