= Maneater (Nelly Furtado song) =

2006 single by Nelly Furtado

Single by Nelly Furtado

from the album Loose
- B-side: "Crazy"; "Undercover"
- Released: 26 May 2006
- Studio: The Hit Factory Criteria (Miami, Florida)
- Genre: Dance-rock
- Length: 4:19
- Label: Geffen; MMG
- Songwriters: Nelly Furtado; Tim Mosley; Nate Hills; Jim Beanz
- Producers: Timbaland; Danja

Nelly Furtado singles chronology
"Promiscuous" (2006)	"Maneater" (2006)	"Say It Right" (2006)

Music video
- "Maneater" on YouTube

"Maneater" is a song by Canadian singer Nelly Furtado from her third studio album, Loose (2006). The song was written by Furtado, Jim Beanz, and its producers Timbaland, and Danja. It was released to mainstream radio in the United States in July 2006. The song's musical style and production were inspired by the Hall & Oates song of the same name and other music from the 1980s.

The song received positive reviews from music critics, with most comparing the song to Madonna and Depeche Mode songs from the 1980s. Outside North America, "Maneater" became one of Furtado's most popular singles, topping the charts in the United Kingdom and peaking within the top ten of the charts across much of Europe and Australia. The song became a club hit in North America but was less commercially successful than the second single "Promiscuous".

The accompanying music video was filmed by American director Anthony Mandler in Los Angeles. In the United States, the video premiered on Yahoo! Music on 6 September 2006, and was given a "First Look" on MTV's Total Request Live on 8 September. The song was included on the setlist for Furtado's third tour Get Loose Tour.

== Writing and recording ==
Maneater was one of the first songs Furtado and Timbaland worked on in the Hit Factory Criteria recording studios in Miami. Furtado has described the song as an analogy of how she incorporated the "creative energy" of Timbaland and his production crew into Loose. When making the album, Furtado and Timbaland were influenced by the work of musicians from the 1980s such as Talking Heads, Blondie, Madonna, the Police, and Eurythmics. Final production of the track was delayed after a speaker caught fire in the studio control room. Furtado has also confirmed there was a fire in the studio when she was laying down the track, which left her spooked. She feared something about the sound of the music had caused the flames, and for a while was too scared to work on it, Furtado also said "actually we were scared of the beat. We felt like it had the devil in it, or something. We put it away for a few weeks, until we had the courage to play it again. It was life-threatening! Someone almost got first-degree burns".

Furtado has characterized "Maneater" as "a 'couture pop' song", explaining that it is "in your face and very fashionable, stylistic and of-the-moment." In an interview with MTV News, she compared it favorably to eating too much cheesecake: "It's got a crazy loud beat, and the vocals are bitchy and loud. A lot of people say it sounds like Peaches, because of the delivery, the spooky vocals."

Furtado recorded a remix of "Maneater" with rapper Lil Wayne, which was featured in a Timbaland's compilation album Remix & Soundtrack Collection. The instrumental of this version was also used during many television performances of "Maneater". In Australia, the CD was released in two formats, although one version (the international single) had an extremely limited run and was not widely available. The Australia-exclusive "Maneater" CD single includes a cover of Gnarls Barkley's "Crazy" recorded on BBC Radio 1's Live Lounge program, on which "Maneater" was covered three times, by pop punk band Panic! at the Disco, dance music duo Basement Jaxx and rock band Boy Kill Boy, whose cover was released on the album Radio 1's Live Lounge. The song was also covered by Scottish band Dead Pony for their 2022 EP, War Boys.

== Music structure and composition ==
"Maneater" is an uptempo song that combines 1980s electro synths and a more dance-oriented beat. The uptempo song has prominent rock and synthpop influences and is lyrically related to how people become "hot on themselves" when dancing in their underwear in front of a mirror. She stated: "[It] truly has a life of its own; it makes you move." The song has a dance tempo and is composed in the key of B flat minor, following a basic chord progression of Gb-Fm-Ab-Bbm.

Media sources compared "Maneater" to the 1982 Hall & Oates single of the same name, which Furtado has cited as an influence on her song. Daryl Hall was not pleased about the song; in an interview at SXSW in 2008, he called Furtado's song "theft." He quoted his own song in the interview, singing "Oh-ho, here she comes, watch out boy, she'll steal your song."

== Critical reception ==
"Maneater" earned moderate acclaim from music critics. Rob Sheffield of Rolling Stone stated that while not a Hall & Oates cover, the song "bumps hard enough to qualify as a sequel, and that's high praise indeed." AllMusic reviewer Stephen Thomas Erlewine cited "Maneater" as a highlight of Furtado's makeover, but believed that no matter how much Furtado sings about sex, she does not sound sexy and does not "generate much carnal heat."

About.com's Bill Lamb gave the song 3.5 out of 5 stars, praising the "powerful thumping beat and insanely catchy chorus", but considering the song repetitive and more suitable for the dance floor than radio stations. IGN's review considered it too similar to British singer M.I.A.: "the blatant attempt to capitalize on [M.I.A.] that ultimately causes the track to crumble." The song was later ranked as the twentieth best single of 2006 at The Village Voice's Pazz & Jop poll.

== Chart performance ==
"Maneater" was made available as a download (via the Apple iTunes Store) on 22 May 2006. It was released on maxi CD as the album's first single outside North America on 26 May in Austria, Germany and Switzerland, and on 5 June in the United Kingdom and other European markets. It debuted at number eight on the UK Singles Chart the week before its physical release, and a week later (on 11 June 2006) it went to number one. "Maneater" was the seventh highest selling single in the UK in 2006, with 296,000 units sold. In early 2007, chart rules were changed to allow tracks not accompanied by physical singles to appear on the singles chart, and "Maneater" subsequently re-entered the top forty on downloads alone. The British Phonographic Industry (BPI) certified "Maneater" three-times platinum for shipments of 1.8 million units.

The single became a hit elsewhere in Europe, reaching the top five in Austria, Switzerland, Germany, Ireland and Norway, the top ten in Belgium, Finland and the Netherlands and the top twenty in France. "Maneater" was released on U.S. national television at the Fashion Rocks event on 8 September 2006. It entered the Billboard Hot 100 at number sixty-two, the highest debut of the week, and peaked at number sixteen; it also reached the top twenty on Billboard's Pop 100. "Maneater" reached number one on the Hot Dance Club Play chart, but it was not as commercially successful in the U.S. as the preceding single, "Promiscuous", which reached number one on all three charts. The single debuted on the Australia ARIA Singles Chart on 25 September and rose to the top five the following week, peaking in its seventh week at number three. The ARIA accredited "Maneater" as a gold single for selling over 35,000 copies.

In Canada, where "Promiscuous" topped the singles chart, "Maneater" reached number twenty-two on 23 November 2006 (its fifteenth week). Its underperformance was attributed to the limited release of the CD single, which had been sold through retailers as early as "Promiscuous". "Maneater" was the second best-selling digital track of 2006 in Canada – behind James Blunt's "You're Beautiful" – with 66,607 downloads. "Maneater" was nominated for a 2006 MTV Europe Music Award for Best Song. It was also awarded a 2007 NRJ Music Award for Best International Song.

== Music video ==
The official music video was directed by Anthony Mandler. The video features former So You Think You Can Dance contestant Jamile McGee as a dancer. Furtado had to schedule extra practicing sessions for her own dancing in the video.

The video does not have a substantial plot and, per Furtado's request, focuses on simultaneously celebrating and parodying the "maneater cliché". It begins with Furtado searching for her runaway Great Dane, Toby, at night in a seemingly deserted industrial district of an unnamed city. She follows the dog to the basement of a dark, dilapidated building, where she encounters a silent crowd of people in the middle of what MTV News described as a "Fight Club-esque party". Furtado positions herself in the middle of the crowd and, as the initial beat of the song emerges, begins to dance with "a sense of abandon", according to Furtado. This serves as the catalyst for a dance party that continues as the song plays. Towards the end of the video, Furtado moves to the roof of the building and dances in front of the rising sun. In the end, she leaves the party at dawn, finding her dog sitting at the stairhead near the exit. "I like to walk on the dangerous side of life", Furtado said of the filming of the video.

In the U.S., the video premiered on Yahoo! Music on 6 September 2006, and was given a "First Look" on MTV's Total Request Live on 8 September. It debuted on the show's top ten video countdown on 11 September and peaked at number nine, remaining on the countdown for three consecutive days. The video entered the MuchMusic Countdown in Canada in the week ending 22 September, and it peaked at number one in the week ending 8 December. At the 2007 MTV Video Music Awards, Furtado was nominated in the category of Female Artist of the Year for "Maneater" and "Say It Right".

== Track listings ==
US 12-inch vinyl

1. "Maneater" (radio edit) – 3:17
2. "Maneater" (album version) – 4:19
3. "Maneater" (instrumental) – 4:19

UK CD maxi-single

1. "Maneater" (radio edit) – 3:17
2. "Undercover" – 3:56
3. "Maneater" (Waata House Mix) featuring Alozade – 4:26

UK 12-inch vinyl

1. "Maneater" (radio edit)
2. "Maneater" (Waata House mix) featuring Alozade
3. "Maneater" (a cappella)
4. "Maneater" (instrumental)

European 2-track CD single

1. "Maneater" (radio edit) – 3:17
2. "Undercover" – 3:56

European CD maxi-single

1. "Maneater" (radio edit) – 3:17
2. "Undercover" – 3:56
3. "Maneater" (Waata House mix) featuring Alozade – 4:26
4. "Maneater" (video)

Australian CD maxi-single

1. "Maneater" (radio edit) – 3:17
2. "Crazy" (Radio 1 Live Lounge Session) – 3:24
3. "Maneater" (Josh Desi remix) – 4:27
4. "Maneater" (video)

== Credits and personnel ==
Credits adapted from the Loose liner notes.

Technical

- Recorded at The Hit Factory in Miami, Florida
- Mixed at Thomas Crown Studios in Virginia Beach, Virginia

Personnel

- Nelly Furtado – vocals, songwriting, background vocals
- Danja – music, producer, drums, keyboards
- Timbaland – producer, music, background vocals
- Jim Beanz – additional lyrics, background vocals, vocal production
- Demacio "Demo" Castellón – engineering, mixing, recording
- Marcella "Ms. Lago" Araica – additional recording, additional mixing
- James Roach – second engineering
- Ben Jost – second engineering
- Kobla Tetey – second engineering
- Vadim Chislov – second engineering

== Charts ==
=== Weekly charts ===
Weekly chart performance for "Maneater"
Chart (2006)	Peak position
Australia (ARIA)	3
Australian Urban (ARIA)	1
Austria (Ö3 Austria Top 40)	3
Belgium (Ultratop 50 Flanders)	4
Belgium (Ultratop 50 Wallonia)	10
Canada (Nielsen SoundScan)	2
Canada Hot 100 (Billboard)	60
Canada CHR/Top 40 (Billboard)	1
Canada Hot AC (Billboard)	7
CIS Airplay (TopHit)	116
CIS Airplay (TopHit) Jelo's Toronto mix	143
Croatia (HRT)	2
Czech Republic Airplay (ČNS IFPI)	1
Denmark (Tracklisten)	3
Europe (Eurochart Hot 100)	2
Finland (Suomen virallinen lista)	7
France (SNEP)	14
Germany (GfK)	4
Hungary (Rádiós Top 40)	4
Hungary (Single Top 40)	5
Ireland (IRMA)	2
Italy (FIMI)	10
Netherlands (Dutch Top 40)	10
Netherlands (Single Top 100)	11
New Zealand (Recorded Music NZ)	2
Norway (VG-lista)	3
Romania (Romanian Top 100)	41
Russia Airplay (TopHit)	117
Russia Airplay (TopHit) Jelo's Toronto mix	139
Scottish Singles Sales (Official Charts)	3
Slovakia Airplay (ČNS IFPI)	2
Sweden (Sverigetopplistan)	10
Switzerland (Schweizer Hitparade)	3
UK Singles (Official Charts)	1
Ukraine Airplay (TopHit)	94
Ukraine Airplay (TopHit) Jelo's Toronto mix	199
US Billboard Hot 100	16
US Dance Club Songs (Billboard)	1
US Dance Airplay (Billboard)	1
US Pop Airplay (Billboard)	24
Venezuela Pop Rock (Record Report)	7

2026 weekly chart performance for "Maneater"
Chart (2026)	Peak position
Global 200 (Billboard)	166

=== Year-end charts ===
Year-end chart performance for "Maneater"
Chart (2006)	Position
Australia (ARIA)	21
Australian Urban (ARIA)	12
Austria (Ö3 Austria Top 40)	18
Belgium (Ultratop 50 Flanders)	44
Belgium (Ultratop 50 Wallonia)	19
Europe (Eurochart Hot 100)	9
France (SNEP)	77
Germany (Media Control GfK)	12
Ireland (IRMA)	12
Netherlands (Dutch Top 40)	70
Sweden (Hitlistan)	45
Switzerland (Schweizer Hitparade)	9
UK Singles (OCC)	7

Chart (2007)	Position
Australian Urban (ARIA)	39

== Certifications ==
Certifications and sales for "Maneater"
Region	Certification	Certified units/sales
Australia (ARIA)	Gold	35,000^{^}
Belgium (BRMA)	Gold	25,000^{*}
Brazil (Pro-Música Brasil)	Platinum	60,000^{‡}
Canada (Music Canada)	5× Platinum	400,000^{‡}
Denmark (IFPI Danmark)	Platinum	8,000^{^}
Germany (BVMI)	3× Gold	900,000^{‡}
Italy (FIMI)	Gold	50,000^{‡}
Mexico (AMPROFON)	Platinum	60,000^{‡}
New Zealand (RMNZ)	4× Platinum	120,000^{‡}
Spain (Promusicae)	Gold	30,000^{‡}
Sweden (GLF)	Platinum	20,000^{^}
Switzerland (IFPI Switzerland)	Gold	15,000^{^}
United Kingdom (BPI)	3× Platinum	1,800,000^{‡}
United States (RIAA)	2× Platinum	2,000,000^{‡}
^{*} Sales figures based on certification alone.^{^} Shipments figures based on certification alone.^{‡} Sales+streaming figures based on certification alone.

== Release history ==
Release dates and formats for "Maneater"
Region	Date	Format(s)	Label(s)	Ref.
Germany	26 May 2006	CD; maxi CD	Universal Music	
United Kingdom	5 June 2006	12-inch vinyl; maxi CD	Polydor	
France	3 July 2006	CD	Polydor	
Australia	18 September 2006	Maxi CD	Universal Music	
United States	26 September 2006	Rhythmic contemporary radio	Geffen	
United States	10 October 2006	12-inch vinyl	Geffen; Mosley	
