= Promiscuous (song) =

2006 single by Nelly Furtado

Single by Nelly Furtado featuring Timbaland

from the album Loose
- B-side: "Crazy"; "Undercover"
- Released: April 25, 2006
- Studio: The Hit Factory Criteria (Miami, Florida)
- Genre: Electropop; dance-pop
- Length: 4:02 (album version); 3:41 (radio edit)
- Label: Geffen; MMG
- Songwriters: Nelly Furtado; Timothy Mosley; Nate Hills; Timothy Clayton
- Producers: Timbaland; Danja

Nelly Furtado singles chronology
"No Hay Igual" (2006)	"Promiscuous" (2006)	"Maneater" (2006)

Timbaland singles chronology
"Home Tonight" (2004)	"Promiscuous" (2006)	"Wait a Minute" (2006)

Music video
- "Promiscuous" on YouTube

"Promiscuous" is a song by the Canadian singer Nelly Furtado, and the American record producer and musician Timbaland, and written by Furtado, Timbaland, Timothy "Attitude" Clayton, and Nate "Danja" Hills. The song was included on Furtado's third studio album, Loose (2006), and was released as the second single from the album on April 25, 2006. Its lyrics feature a conversation between two people who call each other promiscuous.

The song was well received by music critics, with some critics calling it the highlight of the album. "Promiscuous" was an international success and became Furtado's first number-one single in the US. It was the first number one by a Canadian female artist since 1998's "I'm Your Angel" by R. Kelly and Celine Dion on the Billboard Hot 100 chart. The song also topped the charts in Canada and New Zealand and peaked in the top ten on many charts across Europe. It was the third-bestselling song of 2006 in the US.

The accompanying music video was directed by Little X, and features Furtado and Timbaland, in what Furtado describes as a "verbal Ping-Pong game". Cameo appearances are made by Keri Hilson, Justin Timberlake, and Bria Myles. The song won 'Best Pop Single of the Year' at the 2006 Billboard Music Awards and received a nomination for the 'Best Pop Collaboration with Vocals' at the 49th Grammy Awards, losing to Tony Bennett and Stevie Wonder's "For Once in My Life".

== Background and writing ==
The lyrics of "Promiscuous" describe the two sides of a relationship for the song's protagonist. It was one of the first songs Furtado wrote with labelmate Timothy "Attitude" Clayton. Furtado called their teamwork something she "had never done before", and viewed the writing process as "extremely freeing" because of his different approach and style. Clayton helped Furtado experiment with interpreting the "promiscuous girl" character and her two-sided relationship. Furtado also said that in the process of writing lyrics "we were actually flirting, which is why the song is so playful" and that she and Clayton nicknamed the song 'The BlackBerry Song', because "everything we say in the song you could text-message to somebody".

Because of the preponderant musical influence of artists such as Talking Heads, Blondie, Madonna, The Police, and Eurythmics, whom producers Timbaland and Danja listened to during the writing of the album, "Promiscuous" takes inspiration from pop music of the 1980s. Its sound was deemed a "playful" fusion of electropop and dance-pop featuring a "bubbling" hip-hop groove. The sexuality was based on "strong women in control" of the 1990s, such as Queen Latifah, MC Lyte, Yo-Yo, Salt-n-Pepa, and TLC. Due to its sexually charged nature, Furtado was initially hesitant about recording "Promiscuous." The track was one of the last songs to be completed for Loose, with Furtado and Timbaland finishing it right before Geffen Records executives arrived to hear how the material was shaping up.

The reference to basketball player Steve Nash in the lyrics led to speculation that he and Furtado were romantically involved, but both denied any link, with Nash commenting, "I'm flattered that she put me in her song, but I'm completely in love with my wife and two little baby girls". Furtado decided to include him because she and Nash are both from Victoria, British Columbia, and due to frequent mention of basketballers in songs, she decided to "give him the props". In one of the verses Timbaland introduces himself as Thomas Crown, a reference to The Thomas Crown Affair, a film about a wealthy businessman who plays a cat-and-mouse/flirting game with an insurance investigator. Timbaland performed the song live only on special occasions, such as Furtado's appearance on Saturday Night Live, and the 2006 MuchMusic Video Awards. Starting with Furtado's show at the 94th Grey Cup on November 19, 2006, and extending into the Get Loose Tour, Timbaland's part is filled in by Canadian rapper Saukrates.

== Critical reception ==
"Promiscuous" received positive reviews from music critics. Rob Sheffield of Rolling Stone considered it a highlight on Loose. Timbaland's appearance received particular praise, which added Furtado's "high-school musical vocals" over his eighty beats according to Sheffield. The New Yorker considered it "a playful update" of Janet Jackson's "Nasty", using "a heavier and darker rhythmic bed." AllMusic reviewer Stephen Thomas Erlewine compared it to "vintage Prince", citing "Promiscuous" as a highlight of Furtado's makeover.

However, Erlewine believed that no matter how much Furtado sings about sex, she does not actually sound sexy and does not "generate much carnal heat". IGN's review considered the song "simultaneously annoying and yet catchy beyond belief" and listed as one of Loose's "Definitely Downloads". Pitchfork called it "one of the best vocal performances of [Timbaland's] career", and Billboard called the duo of Furtado and Timbaland "a surprisingly good match". The song was also included in four lists of best songs of 2006: fourth on Blender, sixth at The Village Voice's Pazz & Jop, 56th on Rolling Stone, and 80th on Pitchfork.

On December 4, 2006, "Promiscuous" won 'Best Pop Single of the Year' at the 2006 Billboard Music Awards, beating Daniel Powter's "Bad Day" and Sean Paul's "Temperature". The song was nominated for 'Best Pop Collaboration with Vocals' at the 49th Annual Grammy Awards, losing to Tony Bennett & Stevie Wonder's "For Once in My Life".

== Chart performance ==
In Canada, the single's music video debuted on MuchMusic's MuchOnDemand after an interview with Furtado on May 8, 2006. On May 27, 2006, "Promiscuous" debuted inside the top five on the Canadian Singles Chart, and on June 17, it became Furtado's first Canadian number one single. It spent twenty-five weeks on the singles chart, and returned to number two after the commercial release of Loose, but was the year's shortest-running number-one single. In April 2008, the Canadian Recording Industry Association (CRIA) began certifying ringtone sales, and "Promiscuous" was included in its debut list, having sold 120,000 copies in Canada. The single was certified 3× Platinum in January 2007 for digital download sales, denoting sales of 60,000 copies.

In the United States, "Promiscuous" debuted at number sixty-four on the Billboard Hot 100 for the week of May 20, 2006, it became her third charted single on the Hot 100 and her first entry since 2001. On July 8, it topped the Billboard Hot 100, becoming her first number one single. It spent six weeks at the top spot and was replaced by Fergie's "London Bridge". The song reached the top position on Billboard Pop Songs and Hot Dance Club Play chart. "Promiscuous" reached number twenty-two on the Billboard Hot R&B/Hip-Hop Songs and number thirty-six on Hot Latin Songs chart. The song was certified platinum by the Recording Industry Association of America (RIAA) for sales of one million digital copies. It also made number three on the Billboard Hot 100-year-end chart and number forty-four on the decade-end chart. Throughout 2006, it sold 1,709,274 digital copies. As of August 2009, the song sold over 2,817,000 digital downloads in the United States.

Outside North America, "Promiscuous" performed well. The song debuted at number five on the Australian ARIA Charts and peaked at number two in its third week. It was her first top five hit since "I'm Like a Bird" (2000) and was certified 6× platinum by the Australian Recording Industry Association (ARIA) for the sales of 420,000 digital copies.

"Promiscuous" debuted at No. 33 on the New Zealand Top 40 on July 10, 2006. It topped the chart in its third week and became her second number-one single after "Turn off the Light" (2001). It remained the top spot for five weeks and was certified gold by the Recording Industry Association of New Zealand (RIANZ).

In Europe, "Promiscuous" became a commercial success, peaking at number five on European Hot 100 Singles. The song debuted at number fifteen on the UK Singles Chart and peaked at number three the following week. It spent a total of fourteen weeks on the chart. On December 31, 2006 BBC Radio 1 reported that "Promiscuous" was the thirty-eighth highest selling single in the UK in 2006. The single re-entered the UK Singles Chart at number sixty-six in January 2007 due to The Official UK Charts Company's new rules. It performed moderately in others European countries, less than the next singles, it topped the chart in Denmark and was within the top five in Finland, Hungary, Ireland, Norway and Slovakia. It missed to reach the top ten in Austria, France and Sweden.

The song remains popular, with a resurgence resulting from a TikTok trend, and re-entered the Irish Singles Chart and the Billboard Global 200 in October 2020.

== Music video ==
The song's music video was directed by Little X and features cameo appearances by Keri Hilson, Bria Myles, Sean Faris, and Justin Timberlake. It does not follow a storyline and per Furtado's request, focuses on scenes with dancing and flirting because she wanted to recreate the song's indicative vibe, and took the opportunity to shoot a nightclub-filmed music video for the first time. Furtado said of the video, "It's that whole dance that goes on. There's that mystery there, the fun, playful sexiness, the verbal Ping-Pong game". Furtado and Timbaland cannot decide whether they want to begin dating or instead flirt with others on the dance floor. Their single performances are intercut with several scenes of a dancing crowd, and the lighting changes between blue, green, red, and yellow colors.

"Promiscuous" premiered on MTV's TRL on May 3, 2006, where it reached number one after spending twenty-one days on the countdown. After its debut on MuchMusic's Countdown, it ascended to number one for the week of July 28, 2006. At the 2006 MTV Video Music Awards, it was nominated for the Best Dance, Female and Pop Video Awards.

The video was parodied by MADtv in a segment entitled "Syphilis Girl". In the parody, Furtado (Nicole Parker) is comically portrayed as having given Timbaland (Jordan Peele) a sexually transmitted disease, as well as on YouTube by the comedy group Train of Thought Sketch Comedy, where the video is parodied by troupe member Kaci and features a puppet version of Timbaland.

== Track listings ==
- UK and European 2-track CD single
1. "Promiscuous" (Radio Edit) – 3:42
2. "Crazy" (Radio 1 Live Lounge Session) – 3:24
- Australian CD maxi-single
1. "Promiscuous" (Radio Edit) – 3:42
2. "Undercover" – 3:57
3. "Promiscuous" (The Josh Desi Remix) – 4:28
4. "Promiscuous" (Video)
- European CD maxi-single
1. "Promiscuous" (Album Version) – 4:03
2. "Crazy" (Radio 1 Live Lounge Session) – 3:24
3. "Promiscuous" (The Josh Desi Remix) – 4:28
4. "Promiscuous" (Video)
- Digital download (Remixes)
1. "Promiscuous" (Crossroads Vegas Mix) – 3:53
2. "Promiscuous" (The Josh Desi Remix) – 4:28
3. "Promiscuous" (Crossroads Mix Instrumental) – 3:53
4. "Promiscuous" (The Josh Desi Remix Instrumental) – 4:25
5. "Promiscuous" – 4:02
6. "Crazy" (Radio 1 Live Lounge Session) – 3:23
- American 12-inch vinyl
1. "Promiscuous" (Radio Edit) – 3:42
2. "Promiscuous" (Album Version) – 4:03
3. "Promiscuous" (Instrumental) – 4:03
- American 12-inch vinyl (Remixes)
1. "Promiscuous" (Crossroads Mix – Main) – 3:53
2. "Promiscuous" (Crossroads Mix – Instrumental) – 3:53
3. "Promiscuous" (Josh P Girl Mix – Main) – 4:27
4. "Promiscuous" (Josh P Girl Mix – Instrumental) – 4:25
5. "Promiscuous" (Album Version) – 4:03
6. "Promiscuous" (Chinatown Remix Featuring Rick Ross, D.O.E. & Stack$) – 4:06
- European 12-inch vinyl
1. "Promiscuous" (Radio Edit) – 3:43
2. "Promiscuous" (Crossroads Vegas Mix) – 3:53
3. "Promiscuous" (The Josh Desi Remix) – 4:28
4. "Promiscuous" (Instrumental) – 4:03
- Axwell Remix – Single
1. "Promiscuous" (Axwell Remix) – 6:04

== Personnel ==
Credits are adapted from the Loose liner notes.

- Nelly Furtado – lyrics, lead vocals, background vocals
- Timbaland – lyrics, lead vocals, producer, drums, keyboards
- Nate "Danja" Hills – producer, drums, keyboards
- Demacio "Demo" Castellón – engineering, mixing, recording, additional programming
- Marcella "Ms. Lago" Araica – additional recording
- Jim Beanz – additional background vocals, vocal production
- James Roach – second engineering
- Kobla Tetey – second engineering
- Ben Jost – second engineering
- Vadim Chislov – second engineering
- Timothy "Attitude" Clayton – lyrics
- Recorded at The Hit Factory Criteria, Miami, Florida
- Mixed at Thomas Crown Studios, Virginia Beach, Virginia

== Charts ==
=== Weekly charts ===
2006 weekly chart performance for "Promiscuous"
Chart (2006)	Peak position
Australia (ARIA)	2
Australian Urban (ARIA)	1
Austria (Ö3 Austria Top 40)	2
Belgium (Ultratop 50 Flanders)	6
Belgium (Ultratop 50 Wallonia)	8
Canada (Nielsen SoundScan)	1
Canada CHR/Top 40 (Billboard)	1
Canada Hot AC (Billboard)	3
CIS Airplay (TopHit)	85
Croatia (HRT)	9
Czech Republic (Rádio – Top 100)	6
Denmark (Tracklisten)	1
European Hot 100 Singles (Billboard)	5
Finland (Suomen virallinen lista)	4
France (SNEP)	15
Germany (GfK)	6
Hungary (Rádiós Top 40)	4
Hungary (Dance Top 40)	2
Ireland (IRMA)	5
Italy (FIMI)	8
Latvia (Latvian Airplay Top 50)	2
Lithuania (EHR)	6
Netherlands (Dutch Top 40)	9
Netherlands (Single Top 100)	1
New Zealand (Recorded Music NZ)	1
Norway (VG-lista)	3
Romania (Romanian Top 100)	5
Russia Airplay (TopHit)	79
Scottish Singles Sales (Official Charts)	5
Slovakia (Rádio Top 100)	2
Sweden (Sverigetopplistan)	16
Switzerland (Schweizer Hitparade)	6
UK Singles (OCC)	3
UK Hip Hop/R&B (Official Charts)	2
Ukraine Airplay (TopHit)	160
Ukraine Airplay (TopHit) Crossroads mix	146
Ukraine Airplay (TopHit) Josh P Gil mix	174
US Billboard Hot 100	1
US Adult Top 40 (Billboard)	27
US Dance Club Songs (Billboard)	1
US Hot R&B/Hip-Hop Songs (Billboard)	22
US Mainstream Top 40 (Billboard)	1
US Pop 100 (Billboard)	1
US Rhythmic Airplay (Billboard)	2

2010 weekly chart performance for "Promiscuous"
Chart (2010)	Peak position
Ukraine Airplay (TopHit)	83

2013 weekly chart performance for "Promiscuous"
Chart (2013)	Peak position
UK Hip Hop/R&B (Official Charts)	32

2020 weekly chart performance for "Promiscuous"
Chart (2020)	Peak position
Global 200 (Billboard)	170
Ireland (IRMA)	81

2025−2026 weekly chart performance for "Promiscuous"
Chart (2025−2026)	Peak position
Global 200 (Billboard)	144
Greece International (IFPI)	94

=== Year-end charts ===
2006 year-end chart performance for "Promiscuous"
Chart (2006)	Position
Australia (ARIA)	10
Australian Urban (ARIA)	2
Belgium (Ultratop 50 Flanders)	53
Belgium (Ultratop 50 Wallonia)	52
Brazil (Crowley)	32
European Hot 100 Singles (Billboard)	14
Germany (Media Control GfK)	35
Hungary (Rádiós Top 40)	69
Netherlands (Dutch Top 40)	48
Netherlands (Single Top 100)	69
New Zealand (RIANZ)	6
Romania (Romanian Top 100)	80
Switzerland (Schweizer Hitparade)	48
UK Singles (OCC)	38
UK Urban (Music Week)	5
US Billboard Hot 100	3
US Dance Club Play (Billboard)	12
US Pop 100 (Billboard)	1
US Rhythmic Airplay (Billboard)	12

2007 year-end chart performance for "Promiscuous"
Chart (2007)	Position
Australian Urban (ARIA)	49
Belgium (Ultratop 50 Wallonia)	97

2024 year-end chart performance for "Promiscuous"
Chart (2024)	Position
Hungary (Rádiós Top 40)	86

=== Decade-end charts ===
Decade-end chart performance for "Promiscuous"
Chart (2000–2009)	Position
US Billboard Hot 100	44

== Certifications ==
Certifications for "Promiscuous"
Region	Certification	Certified units/sales
Australia (ARIA)	6× Platinum	420,000^{‡}
Belgium (BRMA)	Gold	25,000^{*}
Brazil (Pro-Música Brasil)	Diamond	250,000^{‡}
Canada (Music Canada)	9× Platinum	720,000^{‡}
Canada (Music Canada) Ringtone	3× Platinum	120,000^{*}
Denmark (IFPI Danmark)	2× Platinum	180,000^{‡}
Germany (BVMI)	3× Gold	450,000^{‡}
Italy (FIMI)	Gold	35,000^{‡}
New Zealand (RMNZ)	7× Platinum	210,000^{‡}
Spain (Promusicae)	Gold	30,000^{‡}
Sweden (GLF)	Gold	10,000^{^}
United Kingdom (BPI)	4× Platinum	2,400,000^{‡}
United States (RIAA)	7× Platinum	7,000,000^{‡}
United States (RIAA) Mastertone	Platinum	1,000,000^{*}
Streaming
Greece (IFPI Greece)	2× Platinum	4,000,000^{†}
^{*} Sales figures based on certification alone.^{^} Shipments figures based on certification alone.^{‡} Sales+streaming figures based on certification alone.^{†} Streaming-only figures based on certification alone.

== Release history ==
Release dates and formats for "Promiscuous"
Region	Date	Format(s)	Label(s)	Ref.
United States	April 25, 2006	Digital download	Geffen; Mosley	
United States	May 2, 2006	Contemporary hit radio; rhythmic contemporary radio	Geffen	
Australia	June 26, 2006	Maxi CD	Universal Music	
Germany	August 18, 2006	CD; maxi CD	Universal Music	
United States	August 22, 2006	12-inch vinyl; digital download (EP)	Geffen; Mosley	
United Kingdom	September 4, 2006	12-inch vinyl; CD	Polydor	
France	October 16, 2006	CD	Polydor	

== See also ==
- List of number-one singles of 2006 (Canada)
- List of number-one singles from the 2000s (New Zealand)
- List of Billboard Hot 100 number-one singles of 2006
- List of Billboard Mainstream Top 40 number-one songs of 2006
- List of number-one dance singles of 2006 (U.S.)
- Billboard Year-End Hot 100 singles of 2006
