= European Hit Radio =

Radio station

Coordinates: 56°56′26″N 24°07′35″E

European Hit Radio (EHR, Latvian: Eiropas Hītu Radio, Lithuanian: Europos Hitų Radijas) is a commercial radio station in the Baltic states. Music compiled on EHR singles charts, are mostly aired.

== History ==
EHR's history can be traced back to 1992, when Uģis Polis and Jānis Krauklis founded Radio Dejas, which was the first non-governmental radio station in Latvia. Radio Dejas was broadcast from a flat in Tērbatas Street, Riga and reached only the city of Riga.

In 1994 they renamed the radio station Super FM. In 2002, European Hit Radio started a new policy - to reflect the music situation in Europe with fresh music and charts from all European countries. In 2004 European Hit Radio went off air in Estonia after losing its broadcasting license competition to a new Adult Contemporary station, Radio 3.

European Hit Radio used to have stations in Hungary as well. However, Sopron Radio went off air in 2006 and only 1 year after the acquisition of Pilis Radio Szentendre, the latter was sold. Moreover, the owners bought Roxy Radio in Budapest which was sold years following the purchase. Finally, the last Hungarian EHR station went off air in 2012, in Zalaegerszeg.

== Schedule ==
Current programmes include the Morning Show with up-tempo music, European Hit Non-stop, UK and Germany charts, Airplay Top 40, Urban/Black Top 40, European Dance Traxx Top 40, European album top 50, Billboard Top 40, most popular music television MTV and VIVA airplay hits.

"Party Service" plays new club tracks and information about club life in the Baltic States on Friday and Saturday evenings at 21:00, live from Club Essential

EHR Listener's day top 5 at 17:00, top 9 at 21:20 and listener's European Hit Radio Top 40 each Friday evening at 17:00 and every Sunday morning at 11:00.

== Broadcasting ==
European Hit Radio reaches Latvian and Lithuanian territory. Transmitters are in almost every big city.

In Latvia	Frequency
Riga	104.3 FM
Gulbene	88.4 FM
Daugavpils	92.9 FM
Saldus	93.6 FM
Liepāja	96.1 FM
Valka	96.2 FM
Rēzekne	97.1 FM
Jēkabpils	98.4 FM
Cēsis	99.2 FM
Talsi	100.8 FM
Ventspils	101.9 FM
Madona	102.0 FM
Valmiera	102.4 FM
Kuldīga	107.4 FM

In Lithuania	Frequency
Vilnius	99.7 FM
Klaipėda	96.2 FM
Kaunas	102.5 FM
