= Burn in the Spotlight Tour =

2001–02 concert tour by Nelly Furtado

- Tour by Nelly Furtado
- Promotional poster for the tour
- Associated album: Whoa, Nelly!
- Start date: March 6, 2001
- End date: May 2, 2002
- Legs: 5
- No. of shows: 86 in North America; 6 in Europe; 5 in Australasia; 97 total

Nelly Furtado concert chronology
- Burn in the Spotlight Tour (2001–02); Come as You Are Tour (2004)

The Burn in the Spotlight Tour was the debut concert tour by Canadian singer-songwriter Nelly Furtado, in support of her debut studio album Whoa, Nelly! (2000). The tour visited North America, Europe and Australasia, performing over 90 shows over the course of 13 months. While on this main tour, Furtado also toured as the opening act for David Gray and U2. She was also a supporting act for the Area Festival. The singer also participated in various radio music festivals in the United States.

== Opening acts ==
- Citizen Cope (North America, Leg 3, select dates)
- Swollen Members (North America, Leg 3, select dates)
- Tegan and Sara (Hamburg)

== Setlist ==
The following setlist was obtained from the concert held on January 30, 2002, at the Paramount Theatre in Seattle, Washington. It does not represent all concerts for the duration of the tour.

1. "Baby Girl"
2. "I Will Make U Cry"
3. "Party"
4. "Get Ur Freak On (Remix)"
5. "Well, Well"
6. "Hey, Man!" / "What's Going On"
7. "I'm Like a Bird"
8. "My Love Grows Deeper"
9. "Legend" / "Scared of You" / "Onde Estás"
10. "I Feel You"
11. "Trynna Finda Way" (contain elements of "Hey Baby")
12. "Real Love"
13. "Turn Off the Light"
14. "Shit on the Radio (Remember the Days)"

== Tour dates ==
Date	City	Country	Venue
North America
March 6, 2001	Pontiac	United States	Clutch Cargo
March 7, 2001	Chicago	United States	Park West
March 8, 2001	Minneapolis	United States	Quest Club
March 11, 2001	Seattle	United States	Showbox Comedy and Supper Club
March 12, 2001	Portland	United States	Aladdin Theater
March 15, 2001	San Francisco	United States	Bimbo's 365 Club
March 16, 2001	Los Angeles	United States	El Rey Theatre
March 17, 2001	Los Angeles	United States	El Rey Theatre
March 20, 2001	Salt Lake City	United States	Club DV8
March 21, 2001	Denver	United States	Bluebird Theater
March 22, 2001	Lawrence	United States	Bottleneck
March 23, 2001	St. Louis	United States	Mississippi Nights
March 27, 2001	Cleveland	United States	Odeon Concert Club
March 28, 2001	Pittsburgh	United States	Beehive Theater
March 29, 2001	Norfolk	United States	Norva Theatre
April 2, 2001	Washington, D.C.	United States	9:30 Club
April 3, 2001	New York City	United States	Irving Plaza
April 5, 2001	Providence	United States	Lupo's Heartbreak Hotel
April 6, 2001	Philadelphia	United States	Trocadero Theatre
April 7, 2001	Boston	United States	Paradise Rock Club
April 17, 2001	Victoria	Canada	McPherson Playhouse
April 18, 2001	Vancouver	Canada	Vogue Theatre
April 19, 2001	Vancouver	Canada	Vogue Theatre
April 21, 2001	Calgary	Canada	MacEwan Hall
April 22, 2001	Edmonton	Canada	Winspear Centre for Music
April 23, 2001	Regina	Canada	Saskatchewan Centre of the Arts
April 25, 2001	Winnipeg	Canada	Walker Theatre
Europe
November 2, 2001	Milan	Italy	Magazzini Generali
November 4, 2001	Lisbon	Portugal	Jardim Vieira Portuense
November 5, 2001	Madrid	Spain	Sala Arena
November 7, 2001	Paris	France	Élysée Montmartre
November 11, 2001	Hamburg	Germany	Docks
November 13, 2001	London	England	London Forum
Australasia
November 17, 2001^{[A]}	Melbourne	Australia	Colonial Stadium
November 18, 2001	Melbourne	Australia	Mercury Lounge
November 20, 2001	Auckland	New Zealand	St. James Theatre
November 24, 2001^{[A]}	Sydney	Australia	Stadium Australia
November 25, 2001	Sydney	Australia	Metro Theatre
North America
December 7, 2001^{[B]}	Arlington	United States	Music Mill Amphitheater
December 10, 2001^{[C]}	Pittsburgh	United States	Benedum Center
December 11, 2001^{[B]}	Detroit	United States	State Theatre
December 12, 2001^{[D]}	Kansas City	United States	Memorial Hall
December 13, 2001^{[E]}	Los Angeles	United States	Shrine Auditorium
December 15, 2001^{[F]}	Cleveland	United States	Palace Theatre
December 16, 2001^{[B]}	Columbus	United States	Nationwide Arena
January 28, 2002	Victoria	Canada	Victoria Memorial Arena
January 29, 2002	Vancouver	Canada	Pontiac Theatre
January 30, 2002	Seattle	United States	Paramount Theatre
January 31, 2002	Portland	United States	Roseland Theater
February 2, 2002	Calgary	Canada	MacEwan Hall
February 3, 2002	Calgary	Canada	MacEwan Hall
February 5, 2002	Denver	United States	Fillmore Auditorium
February 7, 2002	Phoenix	United States	Web Theatre
February 8, 2002	Las Vegas	United States	The Joint
February 9, 2002	San Diego	United States	Spreckels Theater
February 11, 2002	Los Angeles	United States	Wiltern Theatre
February 12, 2002	Los Angeles	United States	Wiltern Theatre
February 14, 2002	San Francisco	United States	Warfield Theatre
February 15, 2002	San Francisco	United States	Warfield Theatre
February 16, 2002	San Luis Obispo	United States	Cal Poly Recreation Center
March 1, 2002	Boston	United States	Avalon
March 2, 2002	Portland	United States	State Theatre
March 3, 2002	New York City	United States	Hammerstein Ballroom
March 4, 2002	Philadelphia	United States	Electric Factory
March 8, 2002	Washington, D.C.	United States	9:30 Club
March 9, 2002	Washington, D.C.	United States	9:30 Club
March 10, 2002	Norfolk	United States	Norva Theatre
March 12, 2002	Raleigh	United States	The Ritz
March 13, 2002	Charlotte	United States	Grady Cole Center
March 15, 2002	Atlanta	United States	The Tabernacle
March 16, 2002	Orlando	United States	Hard Rock Live
March 17, 2002	Miami Beach	United States	Club Level
March 19, 2002	St. Petersburg	United States	Jannus Landing
March 20, 2002	Birmingham	United States	Five Points Music Hall
March 22, 2002	Nashville	United States	Ryman Auditorium
March 23, 2002	Memphis	United States	New Daisy Theatre
March 24, 2002	New Orleans	United States	House of Blues
March 26, 2002	Houston	United States	Aerial Theater
March 27, 2002	Austin	United States	Austin Music Hall
March 28, 2002	Dallas	United States	Bronco Bowl
March 30, 2002	St. Louis	United States	The Pageant
March 31, 2002	Kansas City	United States	Uptown Theater
April 1, 2002	Saint Paul	United States	Roy Wilkins Auditorium
April 3, 2002	Milwaukee	United States	Rave Hall
April 4, 2002	Chicago	United States	Riviera Theatre
April 5, 2002	Detroit	United States	State Theatre
April 7, 2002	Indianapolis	United States	Egyptian Room
April 8, 2002	Cleveland	United States	Agora Theatre
April 10, 2002	Montreal	Canada	Métropolis
April 11, 2002	Saint John	Canada	The Theatre at Harbour Station
April 12, 2002	Halifax	Canada	HMC Theatre
April 16, 2002	Hamilton	Canada	The Theatre at Copps
April 18, 2002	Toronto	Canada	Massey Hall
April 19, 2002	Toronto	Canada	Massey Hall
April 20, 2002	Barrie	Canada	Barrie Molson Centre
April 21, 2002	Ottawa	Canada	Ottawa Congress Hall
May 2, 2002	Mexico City	Mexico	Teatro Metropólitan

Festivals and other miscellaneous performances
^{A} This concert was a part of the "Rubma Festival"
^{B} This concert was a part of the "Jingle Ball"
^{C} This concert was a part of "O Starry Night"
^{D} This concert was a part of the "Jingle Jam"
^{E} This concert was a part of the "Not So Silent Night"
^{F} This concert was a part of "Kissmas"

Cancellations and rescheduled shows

November 11, 2001	Hamburg, Germany	Grünspan	Moved to the Docks
March 28, 2002	Dallas, Texas	Deep Ellum Live	Moved to Bronco Bowl

=== Box office score data ===
Venue	City	Tickets sold / Available	Gross revenue
Pontiac Theatre	Vancouver	4,940 / 6,703 (74%)	$91,868
