= Hey, Man! =

Single by Nelly Furtado

from the album Whoa, Nelly!
- Released: June 10, 2002
- Recorded: 2000
- Studio: The Gymnasium (Toronto, Canada); Can-Am Studio (Tarzana, CA)
- Genre: Pop
- Length: 4:10
- Label: DreamWorks
- Songwriter: Nelly Furtado
- Producers: Gerald Eaton; Brian West

Nelly Furtado singles chronology
| "Shit on the Radio (Remember the Days)" (2002) | "Hey, Man!" (2002) | "Ching Ching" (2002) |

Audio video
- "Hey, Man!" on YouTube

"Hey, Man!" is a song by Canadian singer-songwriter Nelly Furtado, produced by Gerald Eaton and Brian West for Furtado's debut album, Whoa, Nelly!. The song was released as the album's fourth and final single, but it charted only in Netherlands, where it reached number 87 and Romania, where it reached number 65.

== Music video ==
The music video for "Hey, Man!" is a compilation of videos containing various live performances of the song as well as backstage footage and prep for her Burn in the Spotlight Tour. The main footage was shot live in London, United Kingdom from her "MTV Live in London" show at the London Forum, where she also performed "…on the Radio (Remember the Days)", "Turn Off the Light", "Baby Girl", "I'm Like a Bird" and "Get Ur Freak On (Remix)".

== Track listing ==
European 2-track CD single

| No. | Title | Length |
|---|---|---|
| 1. | "Hey, Man!" | 4:06 |
| 2. | "Hey, Man!" (Live at the London Forum) | 5:18 |

European CD maxi-single

| No. | Title | Length |
|---|---|---|
| 1. | "Hey, Man!" | 4:06 |
| 2. | "Hey, Man!" (Live at the London Forum) | 5:18 |
| 3. | "Baby Girl" (Live at the London Forum) | 4:38 |
| 4. | "...on the Radio (Remember the Days)" (Dan the Automator Remix) | 4:34 |

== Charts ==
| Chart (2002) | Peak position |
|---|---|
| Canada CHR (Nielsen BDS) | 12 |
| Netherlands (Dutch Top 40 Tipparade) | 14 |
| Netherlands (Single Top 100) | 87 |
| Romania (Romanian Top 100) | 65 |

== Release history ==
| Region | Date | Format | Label | Ref. |
|---|---|---|---|---|
| Germany | June 10, 2002 | CD single | Universal | |
| New Zealand | August 5, 2002 | CD single | Universal | |
