= Ching Ching =

Single by Ms. Jade featuring Timbaland and Nelly Furtado

from the album Girl Interrupted
- Released: November 19, 2002
- Genre: Hip hop, R&B
- Songwriters: Tim Mosley, Garland Mosley, Nelly Furtado, Gerald Eaton, Brian West, Chevon Young
- Producer: Timbaland

Ms. Jade singles chronology
"Big Head" (2002)	"Ching Ching" (2002)	"Feel the Girl" (2002)

Nelly Furtado singles chronology
"Hey, Man!" (2002)	"Ching Ching" (2002)	"Fotografía" (2003)

Timbaland singles chronology
"Money Owners" (2002)	"Ching Ching" (2002)	"Cry Me a River" (2002)

"Ching Ching" is the second single by American rapper Ms. Jade. The song is also found on track four of her debut album, Girl Interrupted, released in 2002.

"Ching Ching" features artists Timbaland and Nelly Furtado, and contains a sample of Furtado's song "Baby Girl" from her 2000 debut album, Whoa, Nelly!

The "Ching Ching" music video was shot in Los Angeles, California at night on September 18 and September 19, 2002, and was directed by Marc Klasfeld. The video features Ms. Jade as a woman who is chased in her Hummer by her boyfriend (played by Timbaland) after she catches him with three other women in his Hummer at an intersection. After they leave their respective SUVs, Ms. Jade argues with Timbaland on the street. Furtado joins Jade in the dispute as a crowd gathers, and at the end of the video Ms. Jade takes a handful of cash from Timbaland's pocket and throws it into the air to the delight of the crowd.

== Other versions ==
- "Ching Ching" (Radio Edit) (Clean Version, also serves as Album Version) (3:56)
- "Ching Ching" (Instrumental Version) (4:35)
- "Ching Ching" (Alternative Version) (Explicit version) (4:18)
- "Ching Ching" (Acapella) (Explicit version) 4:39

== Charts ==
Chart (2004)	Peak position
U.S. Billboard Hot R&B/Hip-Hop Singles & Tracks	41
U.S. Billboard Rhythmic Top 40	23
