= Girl Interrupted (album) =

Studio album by Ms. Jade
- Released: November 5, 2002
- Length: 68:18
- Label: Beat Club; Interscope
- Producer: Don & Jay; The Neptunes; Joe Staxx; Timbaland; Maurice Wilcher

Singles from Girl Interrupted
- 1. "Ching Ching" Released: 2002

Girl Interrupted is the debut and only studio album by American rapper Ms. Jade. It was released through Beat Club Records, an imprint of Interscope Records on November 5, 2002. The album was produced primarily by Timbaland with other contributions by The Neptunes, Joe Staxx, Don & Jay and Maurice Wilcher.

The album features guest performances from Timbaland himself, as well as Jay-Z, Nelly Furtado, Missy Elliott, Nate Dogg, and Lil' Mo. Upon release, critics mainly praised the albums production. On the album, "Ching Ching" is the edited version despite the album's parental advisory sign. An explicit version of the song was only available through the promotional or official vinyl single release.

== Critical reception ==
Professional ratings
Review scores
Source	Rating
AllMusic	2.5/5 stars
Blender	3/5 stars
Robert Christgau	B+
Uncut	1/5 stars

AllMusic editor Adam Bregman gave the album a two and a half out of five stars. He said that Ms. Jade "benefits from Timbaland's signature, laid-back beats." Miles Marshall Lewis of Blender compared Ms. Jade to fellow Philadelphia rapper Eve. He wrote that the song "Ching Ching" (featuring Nelly Furtado) is "contagious" and praised Timbaland's "expert production." PopMatters found on Girl Interrupted, Ms. Jade "proves that a sister can deliver (and write) real lyrics without surrendering to hip-hop’s identity politics. As a protégé of Timbaland, Ms. Jade reaps the benefit of superstar production throughout the album. Backed by Timbo’s usual array of futuristic head knocking beats, Girl Interrupted is a sonic delight." Nathan Rabin, writing for The A.V. Club, felt that "Ms. Jade doesn't carve out a distinct identity until Girl Interrupted's last few songs, but the producer's beat wizardry still helps make her debut better than any of Eve's records."

== Chart performance ==
Girl Interrupted peaked at number 51 on the US Billboard 200. It also peaked at number 12 on the Billboard's Top R&B/Hip-Hop Albums chart.

== Track listing ==
Girl Interrupted track listing
No.	Title	Writer(s)	Producer(s)	Length
1.	"Intro"	Tim Mosley	Timbaland	1:22
2.	"Jade's a Champ"	Chevon Young; T. Mosley	Timbaland	4:36
3.	"She's a Gangsta"	Young; T. Mosley; Scott Storch	Timbaland; Storch	4:35
4.	"The Come Up"	Young; Chad Hugo; Pharrell Williams	The Neptunes	4:15
5.	"Ching Ching (Clean Version)" (featuring Timbaland and Nelly Furtado)	Young; T. Mosley; Garland Mosley; Furtado; Gerald Eaton; Brian West	Timbaland	3:58
6.	"Get Away" (featuring Nesh)	Rhonesha Howerton; Young; T. Mosley	Timbaland	4:59
7.	"Ching Ching, Pt. 2" (featuring Timbaland)	Young; T. Mosley	Timbaland	3:55
8.	"Step Up"	Young; T. Mosley	Timbaland	3:47
9.	"Interlude"	Mosley	Timbaland	1:27
10.	"Count It Off" (featuring Jay-Z)	Young; T. Mosley; Shawn Carter; James Brown	Timbaland	3:59
11.	"Really Don't Want My Love" (featuring Missy Elliott)	Young; T. Mosley; Brown; Melissa Elliott	Timbaland	4:13
12.	"Dead Wrong" (featuring Nate Dogg)	Young; T. Mosley; Nathaniel Hale	Timbaland	4:30
13.	"Feel the Girl"	Young; T. Mosley; Storch	Timbaland; Storch	4:06
14.	"Big Head" (featuring Mary Malena and Timbaland)	Young; T. Mosley; Howerton	Timbaland	3:49
15.	"Different"	Young; T. Mosley	Timbaland	4:52
16.	"Why U Tell Me That" (featuring Lil' Mo)	Young; T. Mosley	Timbaland	4:49
17.	"Keep Ur Head Up" (featuring Nesh)	Young; Howerton; Robert Daniel Barham; Jason Alexander	Don & Jay; Maurice Wilcher; Joe Staxx	4:55
Total length:				68:18

Sample credits

- "Ching Ching" contains elements from "Baby Girl" as performed by Nelly Furtado.
- "Count It Off" contains elements from "We Want to Parrrty, Parrrty, Parrrty" and "The Message from the Soul Sisters" as written by James Brown.
- "Really Don't Want My Love" contains elements from "We Want to Parrrty, Parrrty, Parrrty" as written by James Brown.

== Charts ==
Weekly chart performance for Girl Interrupted
Chart (2002)	Peak position
US Billboard 200	51
US Top R&B/Hip-Hop Albums (Billboard)	12

== Release history ==
Girl Interrupted release history
Region	Date	Format	Label	Ref(s)
United States	November 5, 2002	CD; Digital download	Beat Club; Interscope	
