= Shit =

Vulgar English word

Shit is an English-language profanity. As a noun, it refers to fecal matter, and as a verb it means to defecate; in the plural ("the shits"), it means diarrhea. Shite is a common variant in British and Irish English. As a slang term, shit has many meanings, including: nonsense, foolishness, something of little value or quality, trivial and usually boastful or inaccurate talk or a contemptible person. It could also be used to refer to any other noun in general or as an expression of annoyance, concern, surprise, or anger.

== Etymology ==
The word is likely derived from Old English, having the nouns scite (dung, attested only in place names) and scitte (diarrhoea) and the verb scītan (to defecate, attested only in bescītan, to cover with excrement); eventually it morphed into Middle English schītte (excrement), schyt (diarrhoea) and shiten (to defecate), and it is virtually certain that it was used in some form by preliterate Germanic tribes at the time of the Roman Empire. The word may be further traced to Proto-Germanic *skit-, and ultimately to Proto-Indo-European *skheid- "cut, separate", the same root believed to have become the word shed. The word has several cognates in modern Germanic languages, such as German Scheiße, Dutch schijt, Swedish skit, Icelandic skítur, Norwegian skitt etc. Ancient Greek had 'skōr' (gen. 'skatos' hence 'scato-'), from Proto-Indo-European *sker-, which is likely unrelated.

== Usage ==
The word shit (also shite in British and Hiberno-English) is considered profanity and is usually avoided in formal speech. Minced oath substitutes for the word shit in English include shoot, shucks, sugar, and the euphemistic backronym, Sugar, Honey, Ice(d) Tea.

In the word's literal sense, it has a rather small range of common usages. An unspecified or collective occurrence of feces is generally shit or some shit; a single deposit of feces is sometimes a shit or a piece of shit; and to defecate is to shit or to take a shit. While it is common to speak of shit as existing in a pile, a load, a hunk, and other quantities and configurations, such expressions flourish most strongly in the figurative.

When uttered as an exclamation or interjection, shit may convey astonishment or a feeling of being favorably impressed or disgusted. Similar utterances might be damn!, wow!, or yuck!.

Piece of shit may also be used figuratively to describe a particularly loathsome individual, or an object that is of poor quality ("this car is a piece of shit", often abbreviated to "P.O.S.").

One study published in 2017 argued that "shit studies" is a cross-disciplinary meta-field of rhetorical inquiry about human communication and reasoning. The authors explained, "rhetorical studies has theorized 'shit' in terms of the communication of transformation, style, and textual relations," particularly in relation to claims of expertise to topics such as "anti-semitism" and "wine-tasting." They conclude that bullshit speech is one-sided discourse that is difficult to penetrate because it contains "ideological barriers to the expectation of mutuality," working to deflect critical responses.

=== Vague noun ===
Shit can be used as a generic mass noun similar to stuff; for instance, This show is funny (as) shit or This test is hard (as) shit, or That was stupid shit. These three usages (with funny, hard, and stupid or another synonym of stupid) are heard most commonly in the United States. Using "as" denotes a subtle change in the meaning of the expression; however, the overall intent is basically the same.

In the expression Get your shit together!, the word shit can refer either to one's wits or composure or to one's things, gear, etc. He doesn't have his shit together means that his affairs are disordered, reflecting not bad luck or forces beyond his control, but his personal shortcomings.

To shoot the shit is to have a friendly but pointless conversation, as in "Come by my place some time and we'll shoot the shit."

A shithole is any unpleasant place to be, much like a hellhole. This usage originates from a reference to a pit toilet.

A crock of shit is something (a situation, explanation, argument, etc.) that is nonsense or fabricated as a deception or evasion; i.e. bullshit. Often abbreviated simply as crock. Example: "You expect me to believe that ?? What a crock!"

The phrase built like a brick shithouse is used in the United States to compliment a curvaceous woman, but in other English-speaking countries to compliment men with athletic physiques. This meaning originates from the observation that most shithouses are rather ramshackle affairs constructed of plywood or scrap sheets of steel.

The shitter is a slang term for a toilet, and can be used like the phrase ... down the toilet to suggest that something has been wasted. Example: "This CD player quit working one friggin' week after I bought it, and I lost the receipt! Twenty bucks right down the shitter!"

Shit on a shingle is U.S. military slang for creamed chipped beef on toast. In polite company, this can be abbreviated as SOS.

=== Trouble ===
Shit can be used to denote trouble, by saying one is in a lot of shit or deep shit (a common euphemism is deep doo-doo). A shitstorm would be quite a lot of trouble happening all in one place at one time. It's common for someone to refer to an unpleasant thing as hard shit (You got a speeding ticket? Man, that's some hard shit), but the phrase tough shit is used as an unsympathetic way of saying too bad to whoever is having problems (You got arrested? Tough shit, man!) or as a way of expressing to someone that they need to stop complaining about something and cope with it instead (Billy: I got arrested because of you! Tommy: Tough shit, dude, you knew you might get arrested when you chose to come with me.) Note that in this case, as in many cases with the term, tough shit is often said as a way of pointing out someone's fault in their own current problem. It is also common to express annoyance by simply saying Shit.

A shitload of something is a large quantity, especially something unpleasant or disgusting. The boss dumped a shitload of extra work for me this week. A shit sandwich is something (like a situation or state of affairs) unpleasant made triflingly more palatable by packaging it in things less unpleasant, as rotten meat sandwiched in bread. The term shit sandwich originates from an old joke that goes: "Life is a shit sandwich. The more bread (money) you got, the less shit you have to eat."

Up shit creek or especially Up shit creek without a paddle describes a situation in which one is in severe difficulties with no apparent means of solution (this is simply a profane version of the older saying "up the creek without a paddle", profanity added for emphasis or humor).

Shit happens means that bad happenings in life are inevitable. This is usually spoken with a sigh or a shrug, but can be spoken derisively to someone who complains too often about their ill fortunes, or in an irritating manner.

When the shit hits the fan is usually used to refer to a specific time of confrontation or trouble, which requires decisive action. This is often used in reference to combat situations and the action scenes in movies, but can also be used for everyday instances that one might be apprehensive about. I don't want to be here when the shit hits the fan! indicates that the speaker is dreading this moment (which can be anything from an enemy attack to confronting an angry parent or friend). In polite society, it is often reduced to "when it hits the fan". He's the one to turn to when the shit hits the fan is an indication that the person being talked about is dependable and will not run from trouble or abandon their allies in tough situations. The concept of this phrase is simple enough, as the actual substance striking the rotating blades of a fan would cause a messy and unpleasant situation (much like being in the presence of a manure spreader). Whether or not this has actually happened, or if the concept is simply feasible enough for most people to imagine the result without needing it to be demonstrated, is unknown. Another example might be the saying shit rolls downhill, a metaphor suggesting that trouble for a manager may be transferred to the subordinates. There are a number of anecdotes and jokes about such situations, as the imagery of these situations is considered to be funny. This is generally tied-in with the concept that disgusting and messy substances spilled onto someone else are humorous.

For someone to be described as shitfaced means that person is essentially incapacitated by alcoholic intoxication (i.e. in a thoroughly drunken state).

=== Displeasure ===
Shit can comfortably stand in for the terms bad and anything in many instances (Dinner was good, but the movie was shit. You're all mad at me, but I didn't do shit!). A comparison can also be used, as in Those pants look like shit, or This stuff tastes like shit. Many usages are idiomatic. I'm shit out of luck usually refers to someone who is at the end of their wits or who has no remaining viable options. In polite company the acronym SOL is commonly substituted for this. That little shit shot me in the ass, suggests a mischievous or contemptuous person. Euphemisms such as crap are not usually used in this context.

The exclamations oh shit! and aw shit! are used to express displeasure or embarrassment (sometimes facetiously) with oneself when one makes a mistake, especially a stupid or avoidable mistake. When used to comment on the actions of someone else, they can take on a more humorous quality if the mistake does not result in serious consequences. Oh shit! is also a reflexive expression of horror or terror, as when witnessing or being involved in a life-threatening situation (for example, a vehicle accident).

The term piece of shit is generally used to classify a product or service as being sufficiently below the writer's understanding of generally accepted quality standards to be of negligible and perhaps even negative value. The term piece of shit has greater precision than shit or shitty in that piece of shit identifies the low quality of a specific component or output of a process without applying a derogatory slant to the entire process. For example, if one said "The youth orchestra has been a remarkably successful initiative. The fact that the orchestra's recent rendition of Tchaikovsky's Manfred Symphony in B minor was pretty much a piece of shit should not in any way detract from this." The substitution of shit or shitty for pretty much a piece of shit would imply irony and would therefore undermine the strength of the statement.

The phrase "(I don't) give a shit" can be used when one does not care about something, or has a passive attitude toward said thing, as it denotes indifference. In context, one can say: "You're offended? Well, I don't give a shit!" or "You're telling me? Go find somebody who gives a shit." President Richard Nixon said to aide H.R. Haldeman while being tape recorded in the Oval Office, "I don't give a shit about the lira." He meant he was too busy managing the Watergate affair to consider a crisis in the Italian monetary system.

The shit list is a category of people who are in ill favor with some individual or group of people, perhaps as the managers of a company, and likely to be the targets of special treatment.

The phrase "take shit" means to receive bad or frivolous treatment from someone. Such an abused person might say "I'm not taking any more of your shit!" to indicate that they will no longer tolerate such treatment.

Whale shit is sometimes used to describe a person who inspires displeasure or disgust, as in: "You're lower than whale shit at the bottom of the ocean!"

“You can’t polish shit” (although "a turd" is more commonly used as the object) — or, equivalently, "you can't put a shine on shit" — is a popular aphorism roughly equivalent to "putting lipstick on a pig" . However, the TV show MythBusters showed that a person can, in fact, polish a turd.

=== Dominance ===
Shit can also be used to establish social superiority over someone else. The most common gibe is eat shit! (cf coprophagy) expressing contempt. Some other personal word may be added such as eat my shit implying truly personal connotations. As an aside, the above is actually a contraction of the phrase eat shit and die!. It is often said without commas as a curse; they command the other party to perform exactly those actions in that order. However, the term was originally Eat, Shit, and Die naming the three most basic things humans have to do, and it is common among soldiers.

The phrase You ain't shit, expresses an air of intimidation over the addressee, expressing that they mean nothing or are worthless. The phrase You are shit is also insulting, but with a somewhat different tone.

Hot shit can be a reference to a matter or thing of supreme importance or urgency ("This report is really hot shit!"). It can be used in adjectival form: "This memo's shit-hot!". Hot shit can also refer to a person who either overestimates their own worth or ability, or is highly estimated by others ("He thinks he's some hot shit!" or "He's one hot shit!"). In polite company, the euphemism hotshot may be substituted when referring to a person.

A speaker may show dominance through arrogance using the phrase His shit don't stink. Its grammatical incorrectness highlights the self-importance of the referent relative to the speaker; though His shit does not stink may come across as being more emphatic due to the mixed diction between its grammatical correctness and the vulgarity of shit. This phrase conveys the haughtiness of the referent and that he considers himself beyond reproach. For example: "Those pompous assholes in Finance are the ones who ruined the company – their shit don't even stink!" A variation on this theme might be: "Everything he shits smells just like roses!"

The expression shitkicker can be used as a pejorative for a menial worker or other low class person. `within the world of (ii) a performer or fan of country-and-western music. The term shitkicker may be substituted with the less vulgar "chipkicker", as in Lyle Lovett's song "Give back my heart" on Pontiac, where a girl in a "cowboy-looking bar" is described as a "chipkicker-redneck woman".

The word shithead is a commonly heard insult. A shithead may also be referred to as a shit-for-brains. Another word for a spectacularly stupid (or contemptible) person is dipshit. Shithead is also the name of a card game.

=== Positive attitude ===
In North American slang, prefixing the article the to shit gives it a completely opposite definition, meaning the best, as in, for example "Altered Beast is the shit". Other slang words of the same meaning, such as crap, are not used in such locutions.

Having a shit-eating grin means the person wearing it may be displaying self-satisfaction, smugness, embarrassment, or mischief. It may also be a playful evasion, as a response to the query "I'll bet you drank the whole bottle of booze yourself, didn't you?"

=== Emphasis ===
Perhaps the only constant connotation that shit reliably carries is that its referent holds some degree of emotional intensity for the speaker. Whether offense is taken at hearing the word varies greatly according to listener and situation, and is related to age and social class: elderly speakers and those of (or aspiring to) higher socioeconomic strata tend to use it more privately and selectively than younger and more blue-collar speakers.

Like the word fuck, shit is often used to add emphasis more than to add meaning, for example, shit! I was so shit-scared of that shithead that I shit-talked him into dropping out of the karate match! The term to shit-talk connotes bragging or exaggeration (whereas to talk shit primarily means to gossip [about someone in a damaging way] or to talk in a boastful way about things which are erroneous in nature), but in such constructions as the above, the word shit often functions as an interjection.

The exclamation holy shit derives its force from the juxtaposition of the sacred with the profane.

Unlike the word fuck, shit is not used emphatically with -ing or as an infix. For example; I lost the shitting karate match would be replaced with ...the fucking karate match. Similarly, while in-fucking-credible is generally acceptable, in-shitting-credible is not.

=== The verb "to shit" ===
The preterite and past participle of shit are attested as shat, shit, or shitted, depending on dialect and, sometimes, the rhythm of the sentence. In the prologue of The Canterbury Tales, shitten is used as the past participle; however this form is not used in modern English. In American English shit as a past participle is often correct, while shat is generally acceptable and shitted is uncommon and missing from the Random House and American Heritage dictionaries.

==== "to shitcan" ====
To shitcan someone or something is to dismiss or dispose of casually or unceremoniously, as into a waste basket. Shitcan can also be used as a noun: Don't bother; a report like this is gonna go directly into the shitcan. It can also refer to being fired from a job: "The boss is gonna shitcan you if you keep showing up late."

=== Backronyms ===
The backronym form "S.H.I.T." often figures into jokes, like Special High Intensity Training (a well-known joke used in job applications), Special Hot Interdiction Team (a mockery on SWAT), any college name that begins with an S-H (like South Harmon Institute of Technology in the film Accepted (2006), and Ship High In Transit (or the variant Store High In Transit in the film Kenny (2006)). South Hudson Institute of Technology has sometimes been used to describe the United States Military Academy at West Point.

In polite company, sometimes backronyms such as Sugar Honey in Tea or Sugar Honey Ice(d) Tea are used.

== Usage in classical poetry ==
Satirist Jonathan Swift wrote a controversial poem published in 1732 called "The Lady's Dressing Room" containing the following lines (115 through 118):

Thus finishing his grand survey
Disgusted Strephon stole away
Repeating in his amorous fits
Oh! Celia, Celia, Celia shits!

== Usage on television ==
=== Canada ===
In Canada, "shit" is one of the words considered by the Canadian Broadcast Standards Council to be "coarse, offensive language intended for adults", acceptable for broadcast only after 9:00 p.m.

On the Canadian Showcase television show Trailer Park Boys, characters frequently use the term "shit". For example, the fictional trailer park supervisor James "Jim" Lahey employs many metaphors with the negative slang "shit" bizarrely worked in; in one episode, Mr. Lahey likens Ricky's growing ignorance to that of a "shit tsunami", while in another episode, Mr. Lahey tells Bubbles the "shit hawks are swooping in low" due to his deplorable behavior and company. The term "shit" is also used in the titles of that show's episodes, themselves, e.g., "The Winds of Shit", "A Shit Leopard Can't Change Its Spots", and "Never Cry Shitwolf".

=== United Kingdom ===
The first person to say "shit" on British TV was John Cleese of the Monty Python comedy troupe, in the late 1960s, according to his own eulogy for Graham Chapman. However, this is not independently verified. The phrase "thick as pigshit" is used in the 1969 BBC play The Big Flame. The word shit also appears in the British film Cul-de-sac (1966), which might pre-date Cleese's use.

=== United States ===
The word has become increasingly acceptable on American cable television and satellite radio, which are not subject to FCC regulation. In other English-speaking countries, such as Canada, the United Kingdom, Ireland, Australia, and New Zealand, the word is allowed to be used in broadcast television by the regulative councils of each area, as long as it is used in late hours when young people are not expected to be watching. It has appeared on ABC News' 20/20.

"Shit" was one of the original "Seven Words You Can Never Say On TV", a comedy routine by the American comedian George Carlin. In the United States, although the use of the word is censored on broadcast network television (while its synonym crap is not usually subject to censorship), the FCC permitted some exceptions. For example:

- The 14 October 1999 episode of Chicago Hope is the first show (excluding documentaries) on U.S. network television to contain the word shit in uncensored form.
- The word also is used in a later ER episode, "On the Beach" by Dr. Mark Greene, while experiencing the final stages of a deadly brain tumor. Although the episode was originally aired uncensored, the "shit" utterance has since been edited out in syndicated reruns.

An episode of South Park, "It Hits the Fan" (original airdate 20 June 2001), parodied the hype over the Chicago Hope episode. In it, "shit" is used 162 times, and a counter in the corner of the screen tallies the repetitions (excluding the 38 instances of the word's use in written forms, raising the total to 200). South Park airs on American cable networks, which are outside the FCC's regulatory jurisdiction and whose censorship of vulgar dialogue is at the discretion of the cable operators.

Since that episode, the word (as well as many on-screen depictions of feces, as well as defecation) has become a mainstay of South Park. Various episodes also feature a character, Mr. Hankey, who is a sentient piece of excrement. Other Comedy Central series, along with programming on other cable networks including FX, TBS, and as of March 2014, Adult Swim, also regularly employ the word shit. Episodes of Graceland, on the USA Network, do also.

== Usage in radio ==
=== United States ===
Unlike satellite radio, American terrestrial radio stations must abide by FCC guidelines on obscenity to avoid punitive fines. These guidelines do not define exactly what constitutes obscenity, but it has been interpreted by some commissioners as including any form of words like shit and fuck, for whatever use.

Despite this, the word has been featured in popular songs that have appeared on broadcast radio in cases where the usage of the word is not audibly clear to the casual listener, or on live television. For example:

- In the song "Man in the Box" by Alice in Chains, the line "Buried in my shit" was played unedited over most rock radio stations.
- The 1973 Pink Floyd song "Money" from the album The Dark Side of the Moon contains the line "Don't give me that do goody good bullshit", and has frequently been broadcast unedited on US radio.
- The 1980 hit album Hi Infidelity by REO Speedwagon contained the song "Tough Guys" which had the line "she thinks they're full of shit", that was played on broadcast radio.
- On 3 December 1994, Green Day performed "Geek Stink Breath", on Saturday Night Live, shit was not edited from tape delay live broadcast. The band did not appear on the show again until 9 April 2005.

Some notable instances of censorship of the word from broadcast television and radio include:

- Steve Miller's "Jet Airliner". Although radio stations have sometimes played an unedited version containing the line "funky shit going down in the city." The song was also released with a "radio edit" version, replacing the "funky shit" with "funky kicks". Another version of "Jet Airliner" exists in which the word "shit" is faded out.
- Likewise, the Bob Dylan song "Hurricane" has a line about having no idea "what kind of shit was about to go down," and has a radio edit version without the word.
- Gwen Stefani's "Hollaback Girl" video had the original album's use of the word censored in its video.
- The music video title "...on the Radio (Remember the Days)" by Nelly Furtado replaced the original title "Shit on the Radio (Remember the Days)".
- This also happened to "That's That Shit" by Snoop Dogg featuring R. Kelly, which became "That's That".
- In Avril Lavigne's song "My Happy Ending", the Radio Disney edit of the song replaces "all the shit that you do" with "all the stuff that you do".
- Likewise, in the song "London Bridge" by the Black Eyed Peas member Fergie, the phrase "Oh Shit" is repeatedly used as a background line. A radio edit of this song replaced "Oh Shit" with "Oh Snap".
- Maroon 5's "Payphone" replaces the line "All these fairy tales are full of shit" with "All these fairy tales are full of it".
- Likewise, Icona Pop's "I Love It (I Don't Care)" uses "I threw your stuff into the bag ..." in place of "I threw your shit into the bag ...".

== Usage in campaigns ==
=== Sanitation promotion ===
Using the term "shit" (or other locally used crude words) – rather than feces or excreta – during campaigns and triggering events is a deliberate aspect of the community-led total sanitation approach which aims to stop open defecation, a massive public health problem in developing countries.

== See also ==
- Artist's Shit
- Bowel movement
- Four-letter word
- Outhouse, also known as "shithouse"
- Profanity
- Seven dirty words
- Fuck
