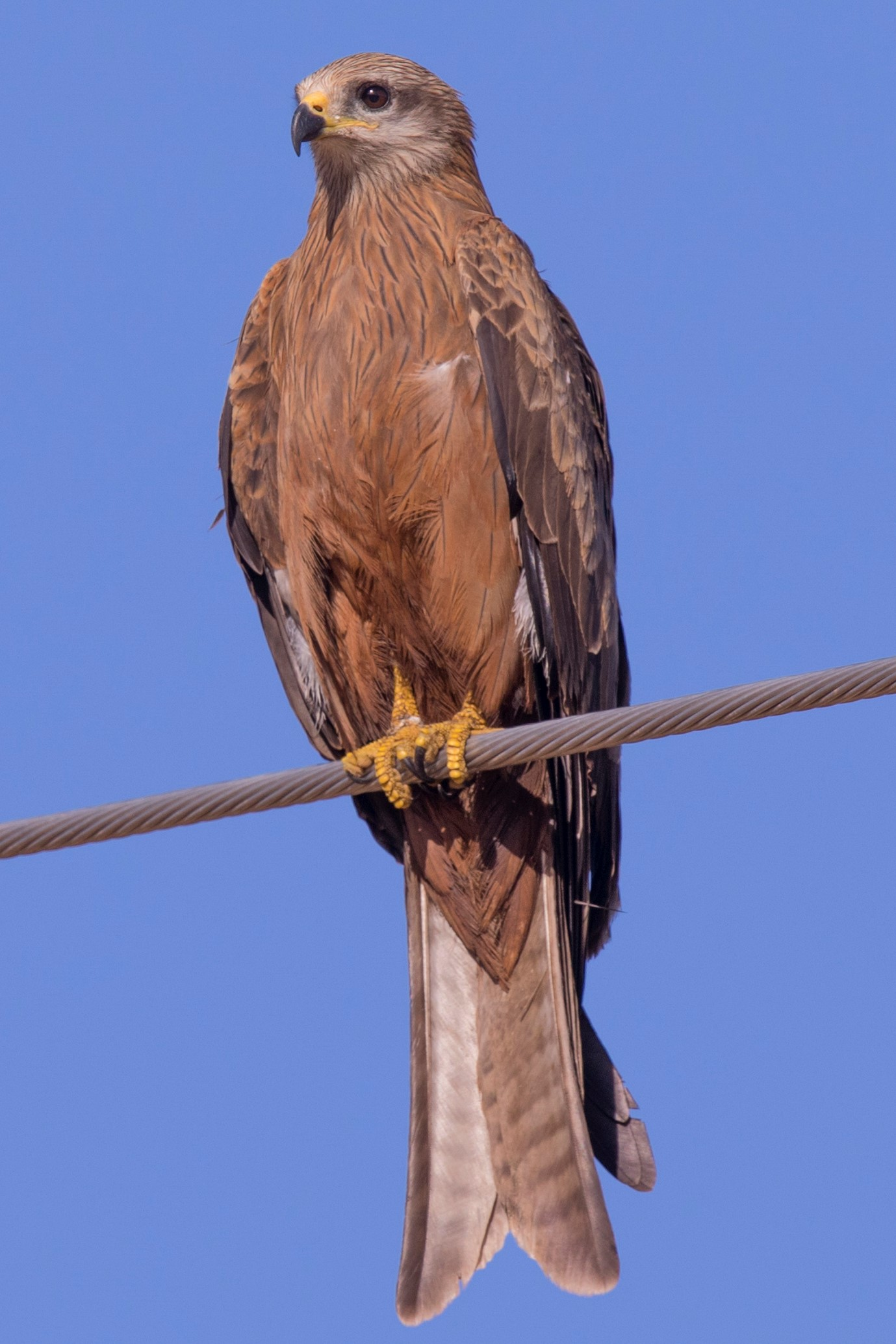
- M. m. affinis, Australia

Conservation status
- Least Concern (IUCN 3.1)

Scientific classification
- Kingdom: Animalia
- Phylum: Chordata
- Class: Aves
- Order: Accipitriformes
- Family: Accipitridae
- Genus: Milvus
- Species: M. migrans

Binomial name
- Milvus migrans (Boddaert, 1783)

Subspecies
- 5, see text
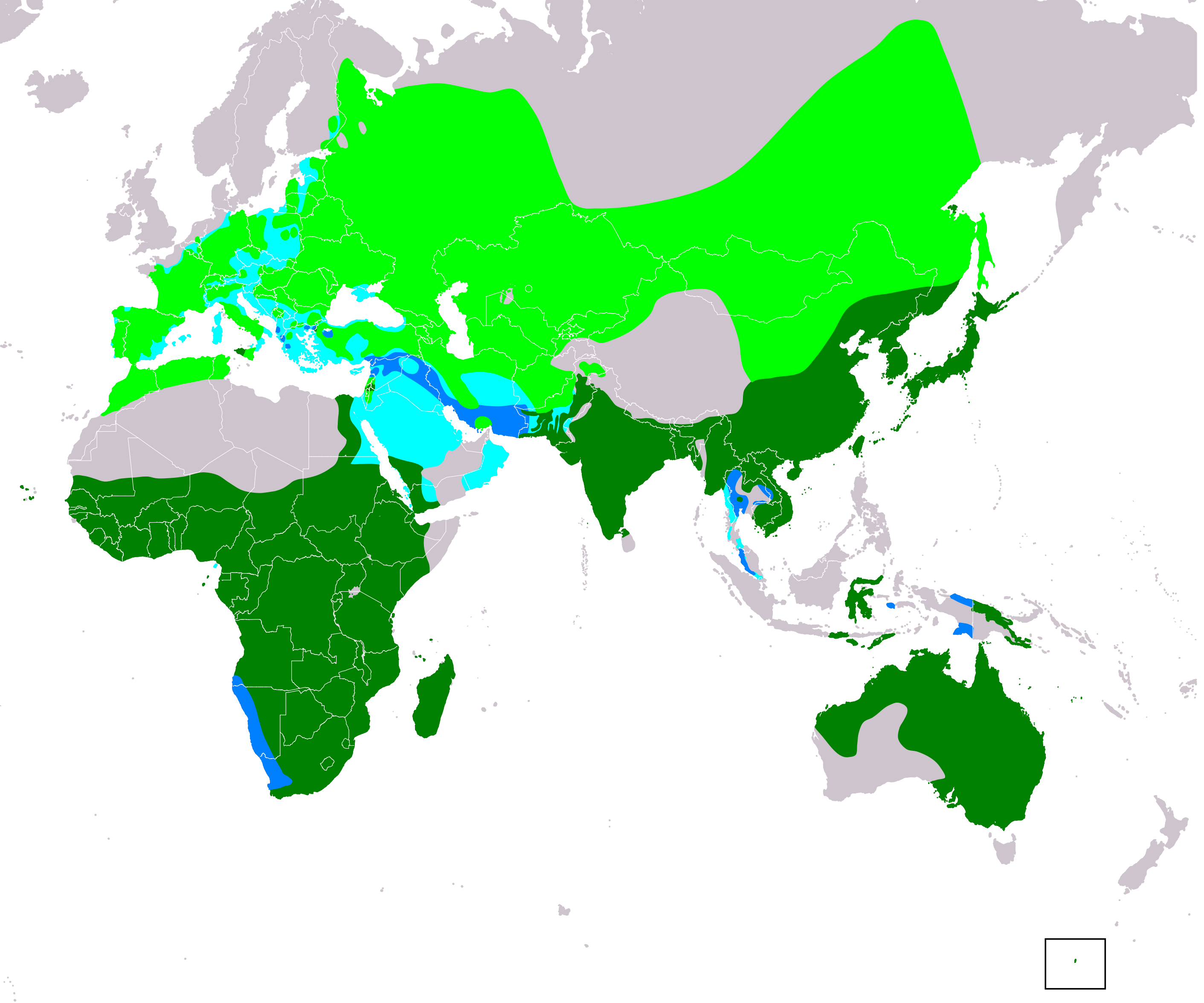
- Range of black and yellow-billed kites Breeding Resident Non-breeding Passage

Synonyms
- Falco migrans Boddaert, 1783; Milvus affinis; Milvus ater; Milvus melanotis

Audio
- Calls

= Black kite =

Species of bird

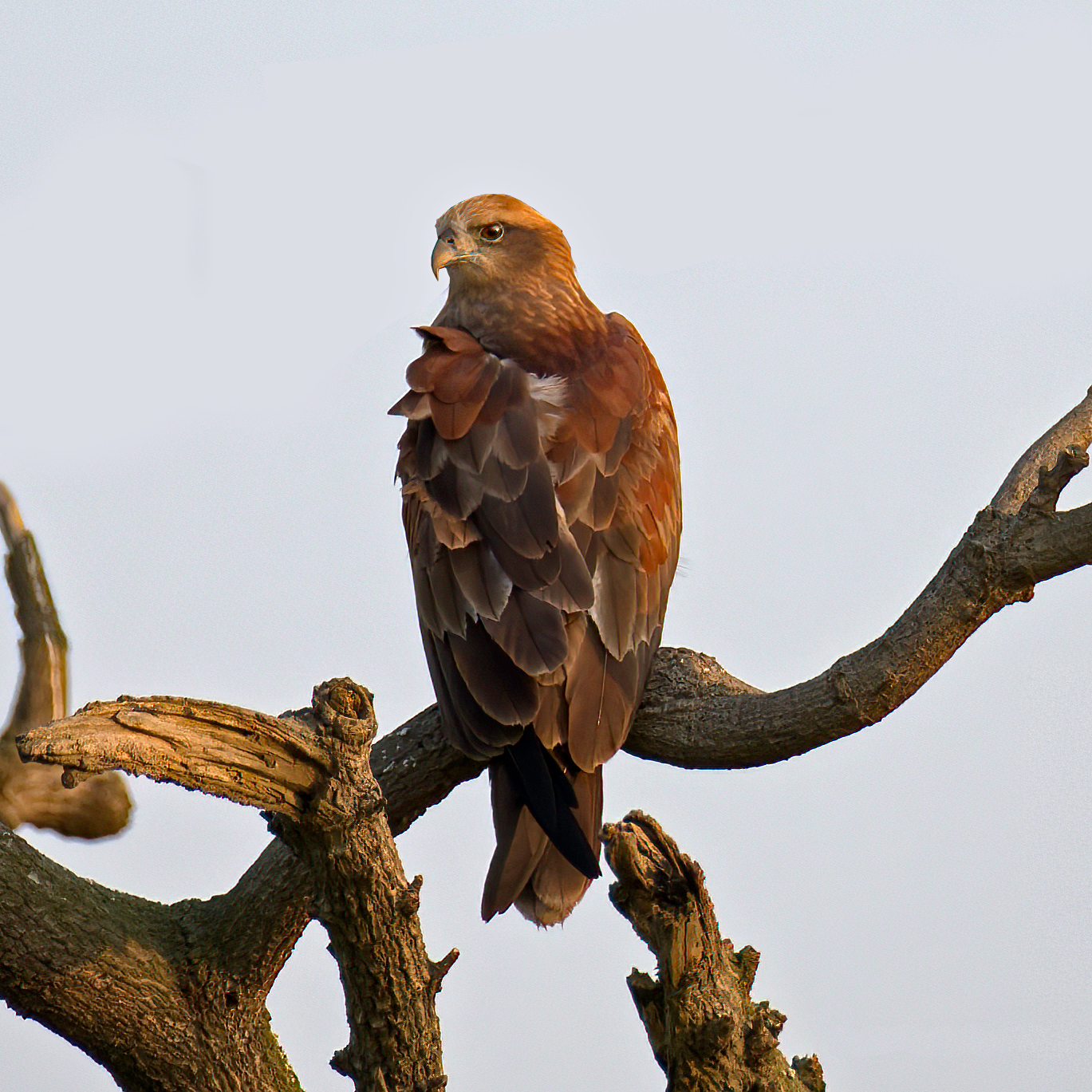
Black kite in Bangladesh

The black kite or fire kite (Milvus migrans) is a medium-sized bird of prey in the family Accipitridae, which also includes many other diurnal raptors. It is thought to be the world's most abundant species of Accipitridae, although some populations have experienced dramatic declines or fluctuations. Current global population estimates run up to 6.7 million individuals.

Unlike others of the group, black kites are opportunistic hunters and are more likely to scavenge. They spend much of their time gliding in thermals in search of food. Their angled wing and distinctive forked tail make them easy to identify. They are vociferous with a distinct shrill whinnying call.

The black kite is widely distributed through temperate and tropical parts of Eurasia and parts of Australasia and Oceania. Temperate populations tend to be migratory. Several subspecies are recognized, with several having previously had English names. The European populations are small, but the South Asian population is comparatively very large.

== Systematics and taxonomy ==
The black kite was described by the French polymath Georges-Louis Leclerc, Comte de Buffon in his Histoire Naturelle des Oiseaux in 1770. The bird was also illustrated in a hand-coloured plate engraved by François-Nicolas Martinet in the Planches Enluminées D'Histoire Naturelle which was produced under the supervision of Edme-Louis Daubenton to accompany Buffon's text. Neither the plate caption nor Buffon's description included a scientific name, but in 1783 the Dutch naturalist Pieter Boddaert coined the binomial name Falco migrans in his catalogue of the Planches Enluminées. The type locality is France. The current genus Milvus was erected by the French naturalist Bernard Germain de Lacépède in 1799. Milvus is the Latin word for a red kite; the specific migrans means "migrating" from the Latin migrare "to migrate".

The red kite has been known to hybridize with black kites (in captivity, where both species were kept together, and in the wild on the Cape Verde Islands).

Recent DNA studies suggest that the yellow-billed African races parasitus and aegyptius differ significantly from black kites in the Eurasian clade, and should be considered a separate allopatric species: yellow-billed kite, M. aegyptius. They occur throughout Africa except for the Congo Basin and the Sahara Desert. There have been some suggestions that the black-eared kite (M. m. lineatus) should be elevated to full species status as M. lineatus, but this is not well supported.

=== Subspecies ===
Five subspecies are recognised.

- M. m. migrans – (Boddaert, 1783): European black kite

Breeds Central, Southern and Eastern Europe, as well as the Maghreb region of Northwest Africa, to the Tien Shan and south to northwestern Pakistan. Winters in Sub-Saharan Africa. The head is whitish.

- M. m. lineatus – (J.E. Gray, 1831): black-eared kite

Siberia to Amurland south around Himalaya to northern India, northern Indochina and southern China; Japan. Northern inland birds migrate to the eastern Persian Gulf coast and South Asia in winter. This has a larger pale carpal patch.

- M. m. govinda – Sykes, 1832: small Indian kite (formerly pariah kite)

Eastern Pakistan east through tropical India and Sri Lanka to Indochina and the Malay Peninsula. Resident. A dark brown kite found throughout the subcontinent. Can be seen circling and soaring in urban areas. Easily distinguished by the shallow forked tail. The name pariah originates from the Indian caste system and usage of this name is deprecated.

- M. m. affinis – Gould, 1838: fork-tailed kite

Sulawesi and possibly the Lesser Sunda Islands; Papua New Guinea except mountains; northeastern and eastern Australia.

- M. m. formosanus – Kuroda, 1920: Taiwan kite

Taiwan and Hainan; resident. Similar to lineatus but smaller, considered intermediate between lineatus and govinda. Recent genetic studies suggest that following the decline of local formosanus populations in Taiwan during the 20th century, the extant breeding populations in Taiwan now consist of intergrades between formosanus and lineatus.

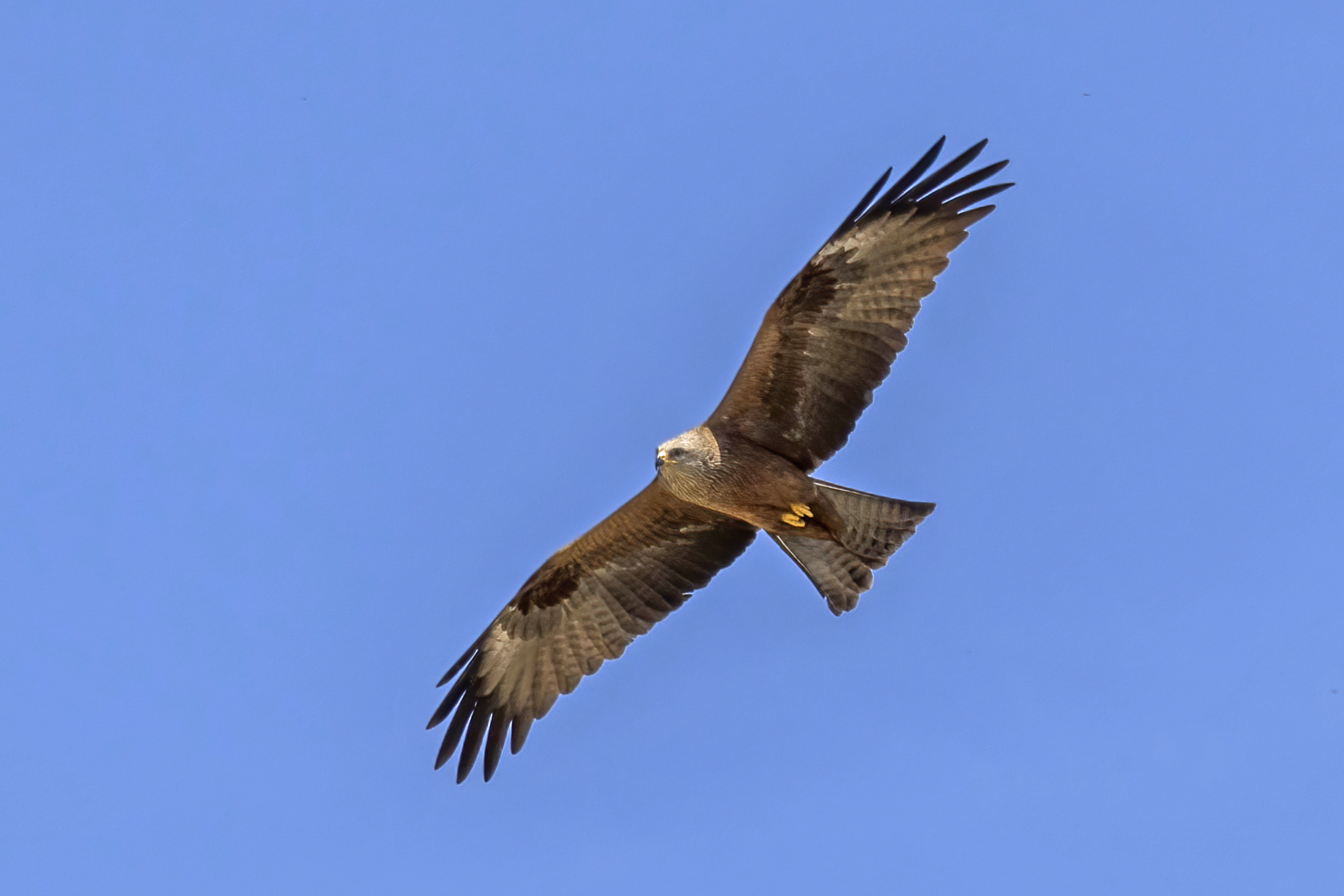
M. m. migrans, Spain

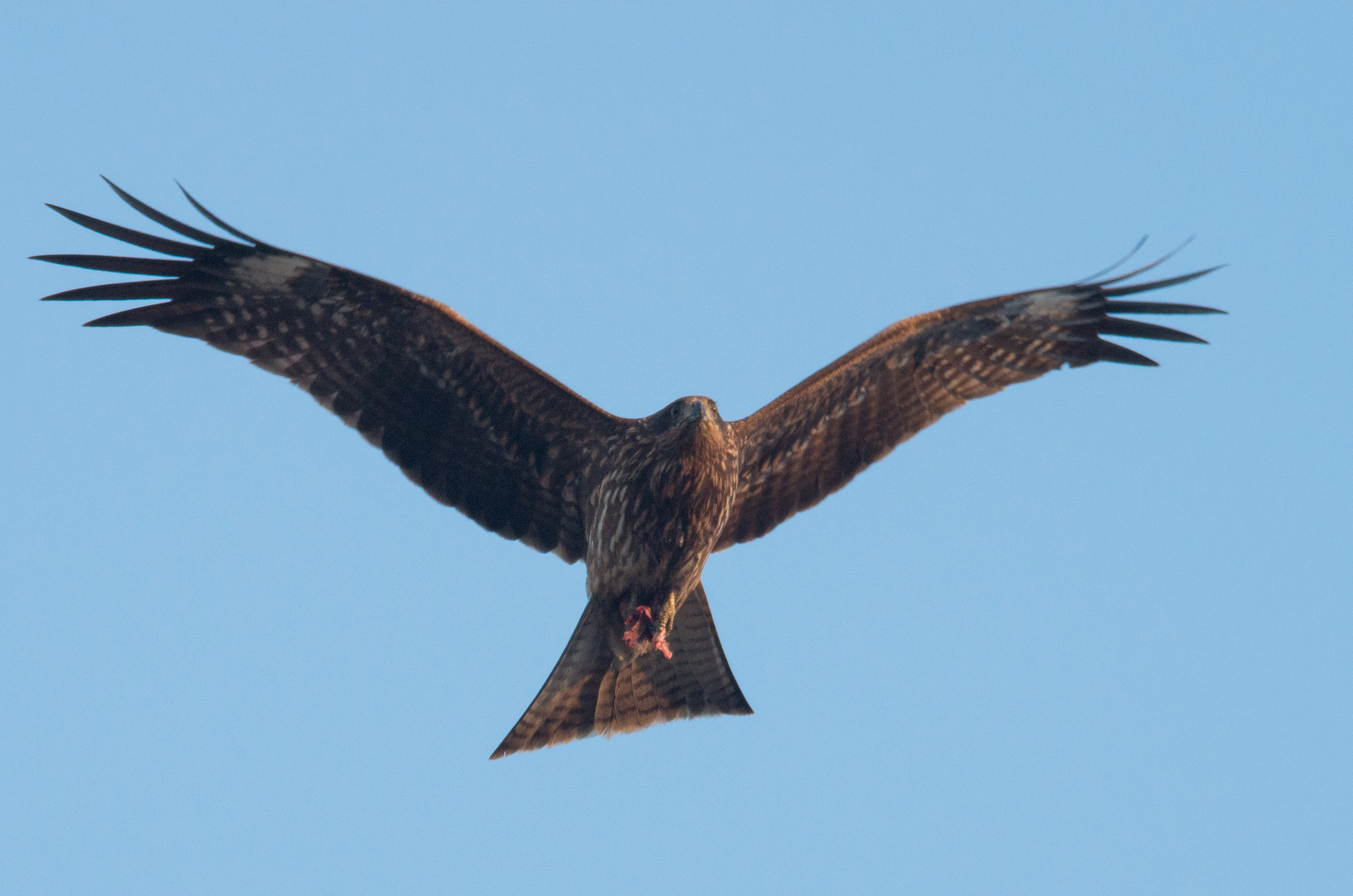
M. m. lineatus, Japan

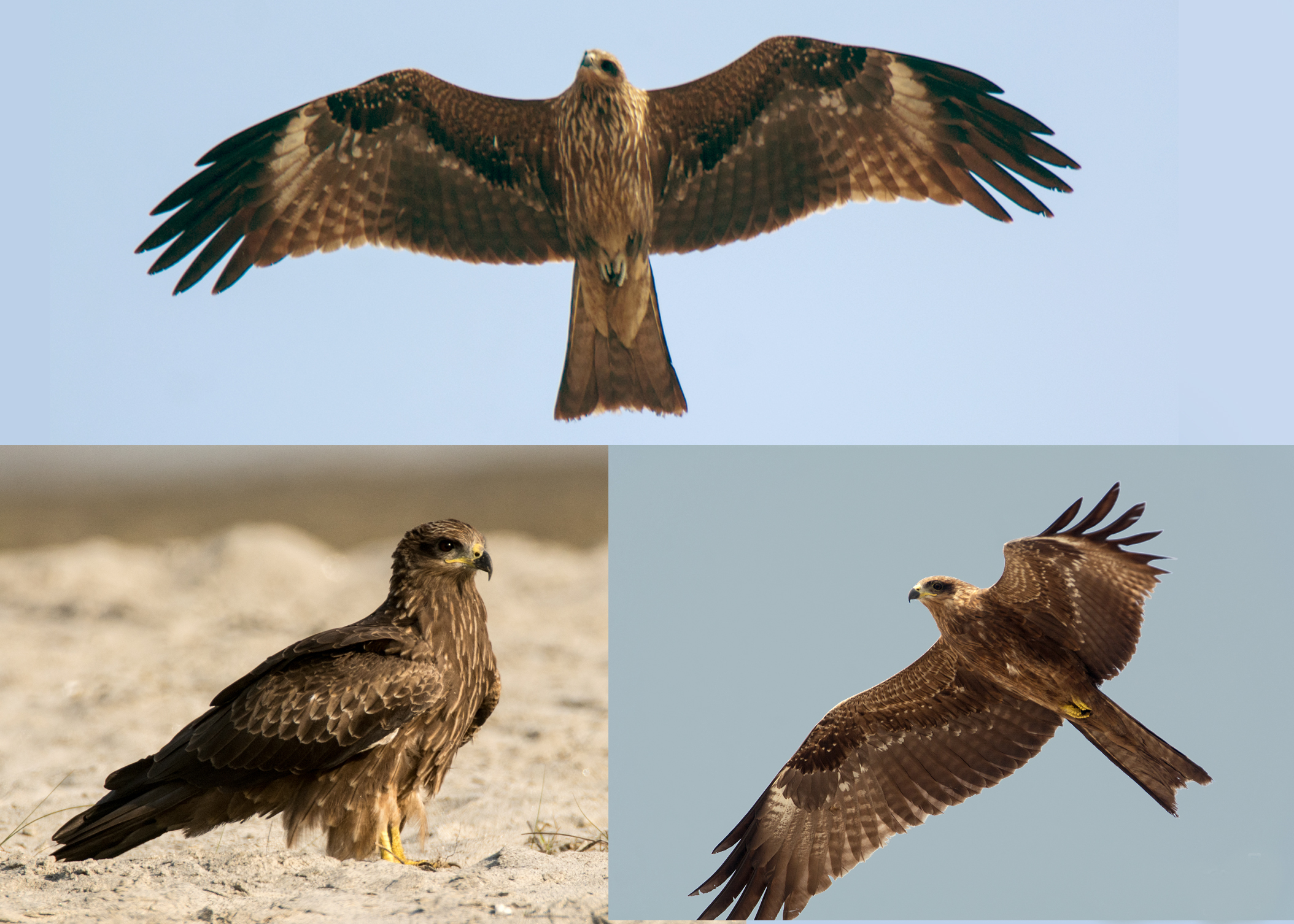
M. m. govinda, India

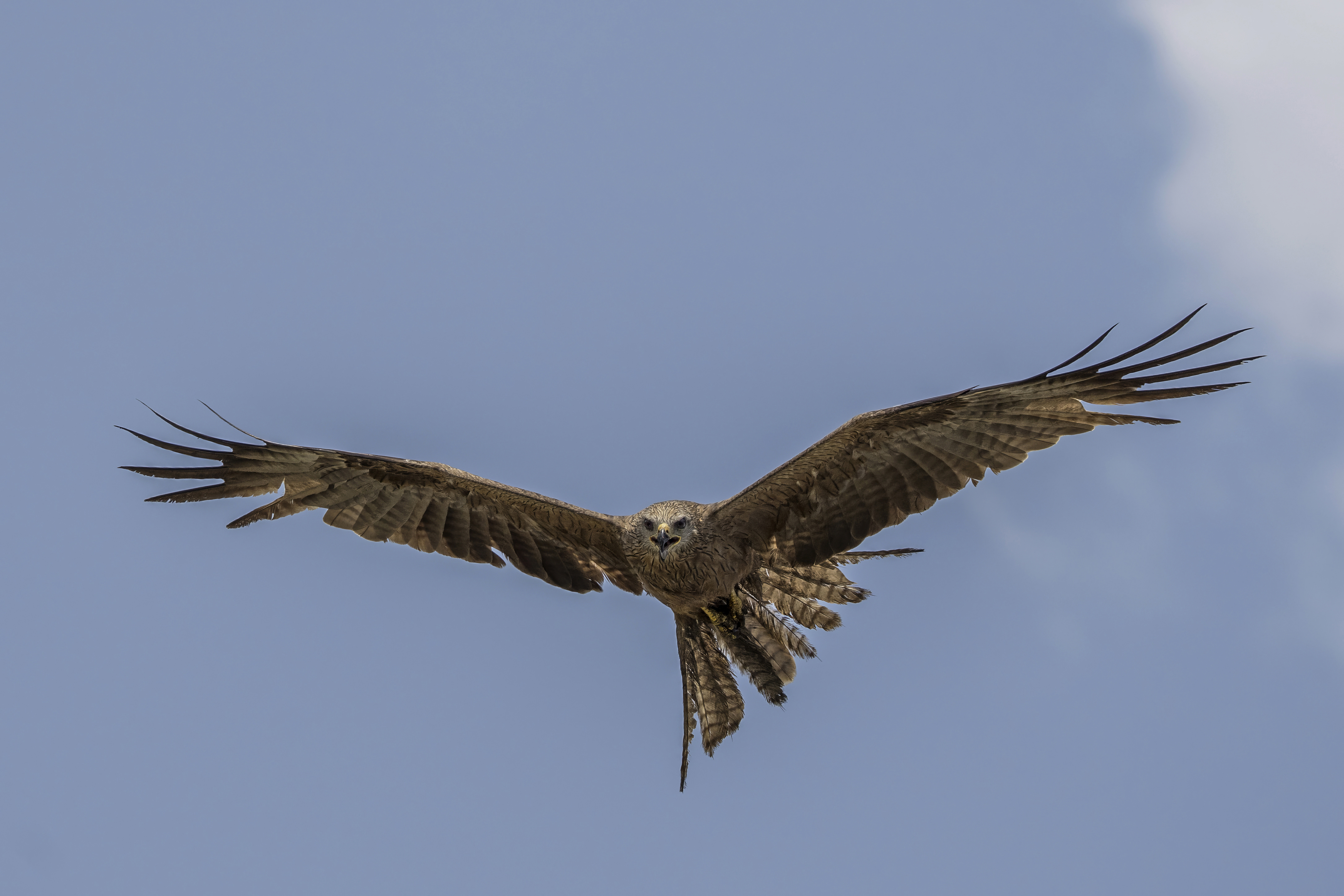
M. m. affinis, Australia

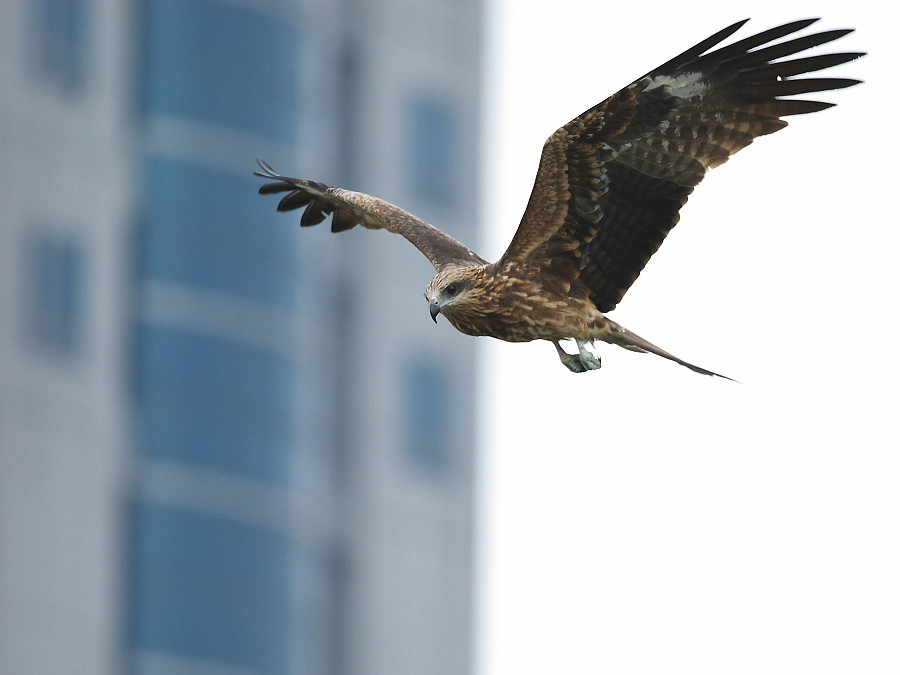
M. m. formosanus, Taiwan

== Description ==
Black kites can be distinguished from red kites by their slightly smaller size, less forked tail (visible in flight), and generally dark plumage without any rufous. The sexes are alike though the male is a little smaller and less aggressive (this is the case in most birds of prey). They weigh 735 grams (25.9 oz) on average. The upper plumage is brown, but the head and neck tend to be paler. The patch behind the eye appears darker. The outer flight feathers are black and the feathers have dark cross bars and are mottled at the base. The lower parts of the body are pale brown, becoming lighter towards the chin. The body feathers have dark shafts giving it a streaked appearance. The cere and gape are yellow, but the bill is black (unlike that of the yellow-billed kite). The legs are yellow and the claws are black. They have a distinctive shrill whistle followed by a rapid whinnying call. Males and females have the same plumage but females are longer than males and have a little larger wingspan. Their wingspan is around 150 cm (5 ft).

== Distribution ==
The species is found in Europe, Asia, Africa and Australia. The temperate populations of this kite tend to be migratory while the tropical ones are resident. European and central Asian birds (subspecies M. m. migrans and black-eared kite M. m. lineatus, respectively) are migratory, moving to the tropics in winter, but races in warmer regions such as the Indian M. m. govinda (small Indian kite), or the Australasian M. m. affinis (fork-tailed kite), are resident. In some areas such as in the United Kingdom, the black kite occurs only as a wanderer on migration. These birds are usually of the nominate race, but in November 2006 a juvenile of the eastern lineatus, not previously recorded in western Europe, was found in Lincolnshire.

The species is not found in the Indonesian archipelago between the South East Asian mainland and the Wallace Line. Vagrants, most likely of the black-eared kite, on occasion range far into the Pacific, out to the Hawaiian Islands.

In India, the population of M. m. govinda is particularly large especially in areas of high human population. Here the birds avoid heavily forested regions. A survey in 1967 in the 150 square kilometres (58 sq mi) of the city of New Delhi produced an estimate of about 2200 pairs or roughly 15 per square kilometre. Another survey in 2013 estimated 150 pairs for every 10 square kilometres (3.9 sq mi).

Vagrants from Australia occasionally reach New Zealand; however, only one individual has persisted there (currently c. 21 years old).

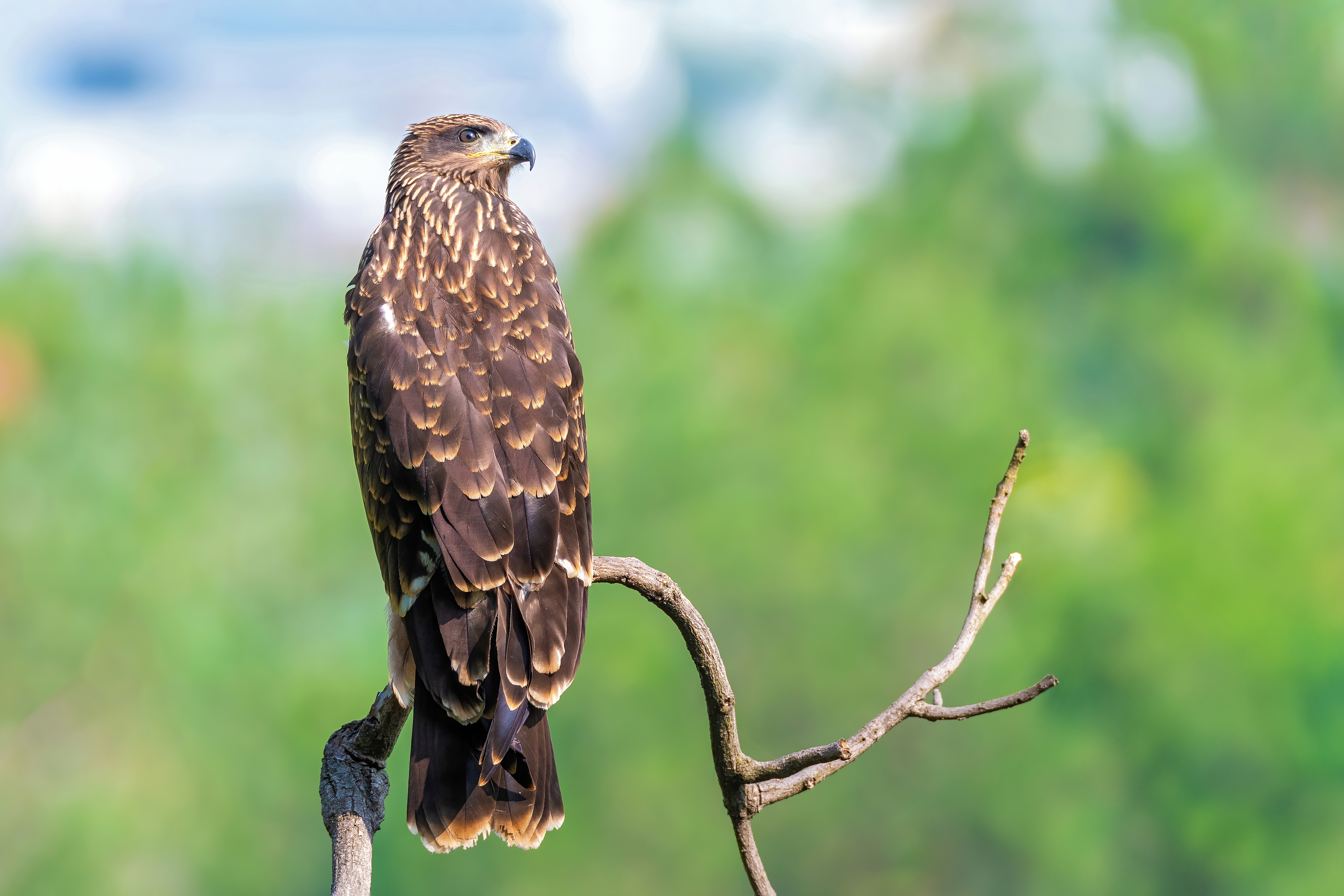
Black kite juvenile in Nepal

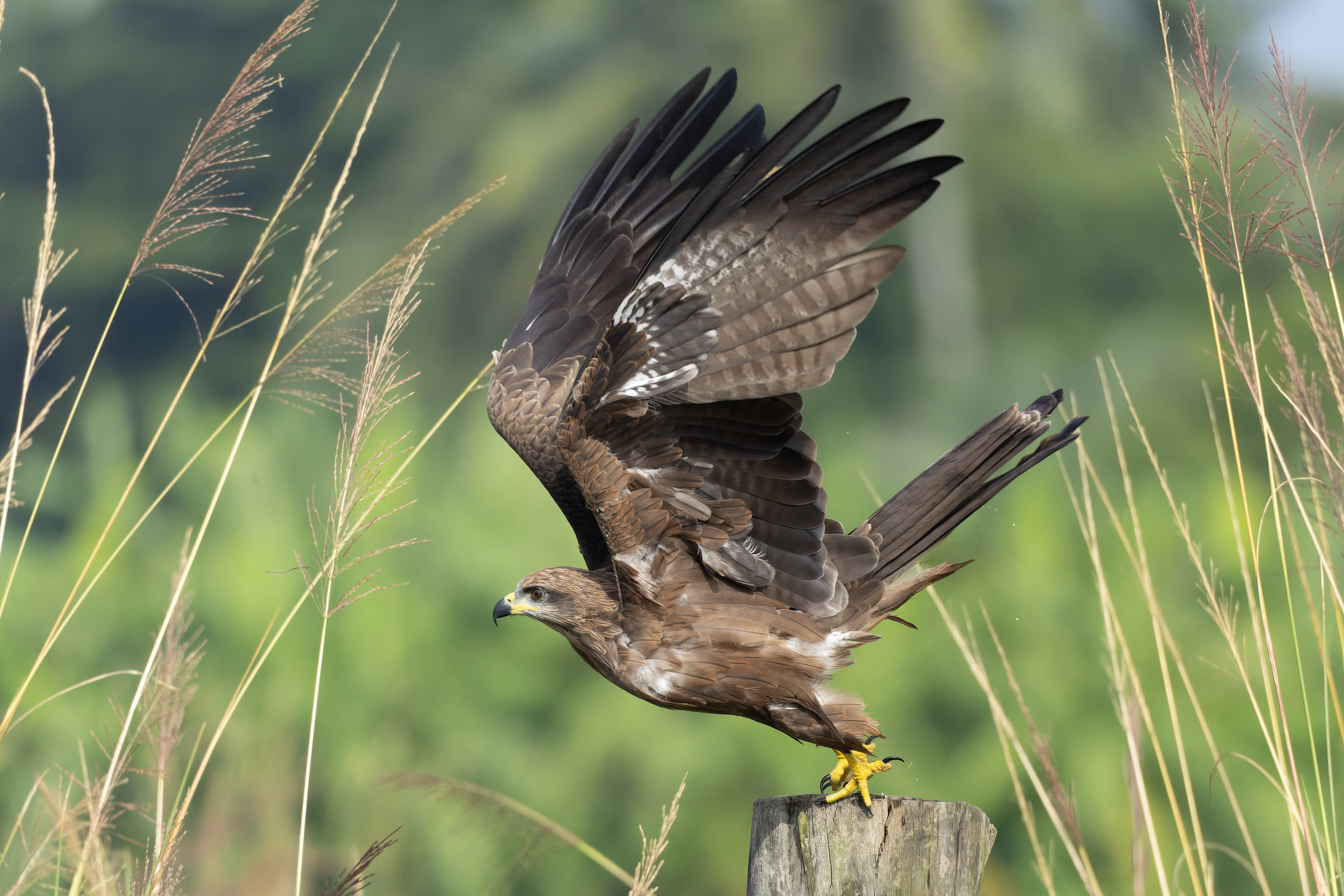
Black kite taking off in Baruipur, West Bengal, India

Black kite flying at the beach in Kanagawa, Japan

== Behaviour and ecology ==
=== Food and foraging ===
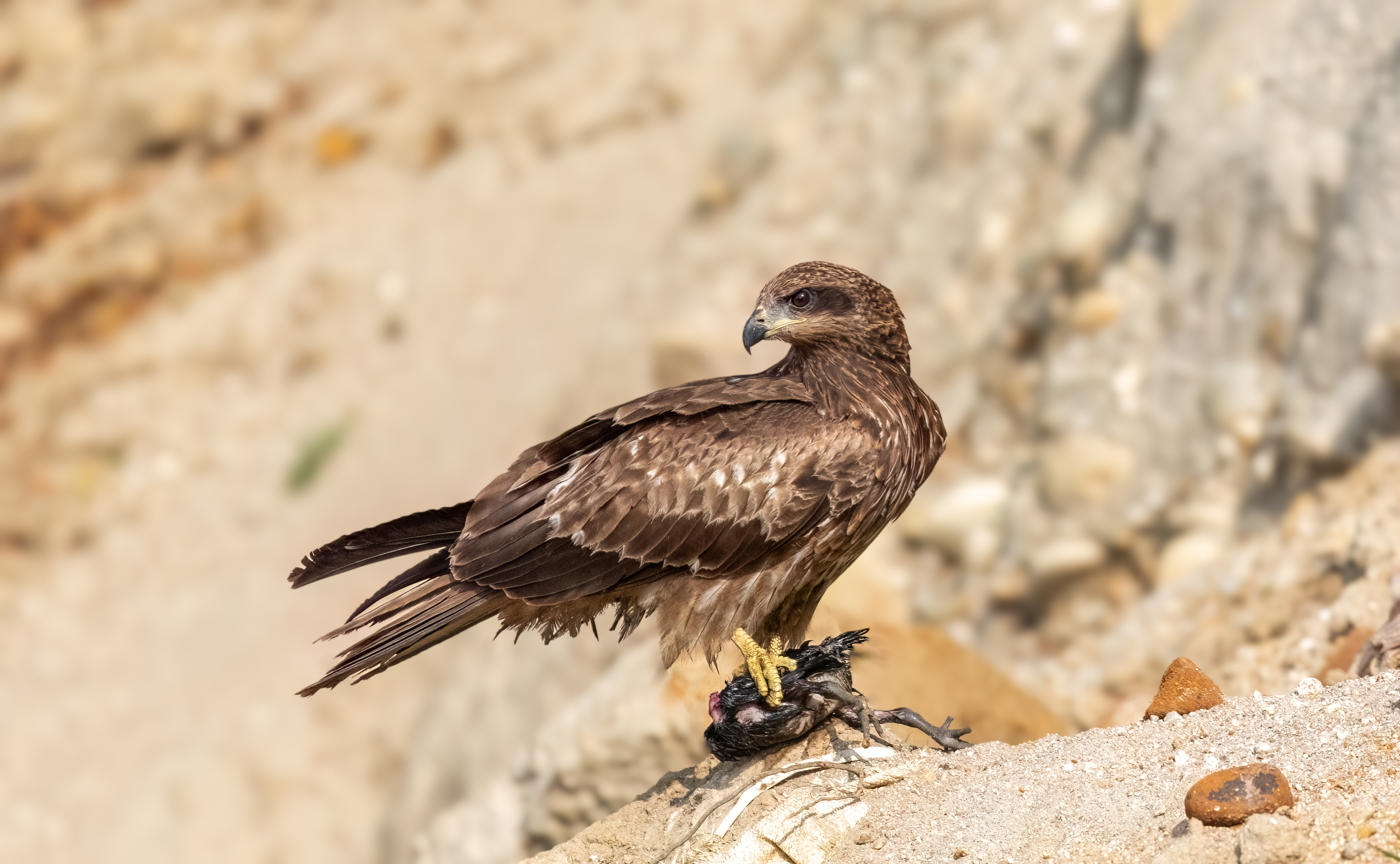
Black kite with prey at Bagmati River, Chovar, Nepal

Black kites are most often seen gliding and soaring on thermals as they search for food. Their flight is buoyant and the bird glides effortlessly, changing directions easily. They will swoop down with their legs lowered to snatch small live prey, fish, household refuse and carrion, for which behaviour they are known in British military slang as the shite-hawk. They are opportunist hunters and have been known to take birds, bats, and rodents. They are attracted to smoke and fires, where they seek escaping prey. Kites are also known to spread wildfires in northern Australia by picking up and dropping burning twigs so as to flush prey, leading to their being known in some circles as 'firehawks'.

The Indian populations are well adapted to living in cities and are found in densely populated areas. Large numbers may be seen soaring in thermals over cities. In some places, they will readily swoop and snatch food held by humans. The meat is thrown into the air and the kites dive-bomb for the meat. Humans who are in the vicinity may suffer serious injury due to the sharp talons of the kites. The reinforcement between human proximity and being fed have decreased the kite's fear of humans. Black kites in Spain prey on nestling waterfowl, especially during the summer months when they feed their young. Predation of nests of other pairs of black kites has also been noted. Kites have also been seen to tear and carry away the nests of baya weavers in an attempt to obtain eggs or chicks.

=== Flocking and roosting ===
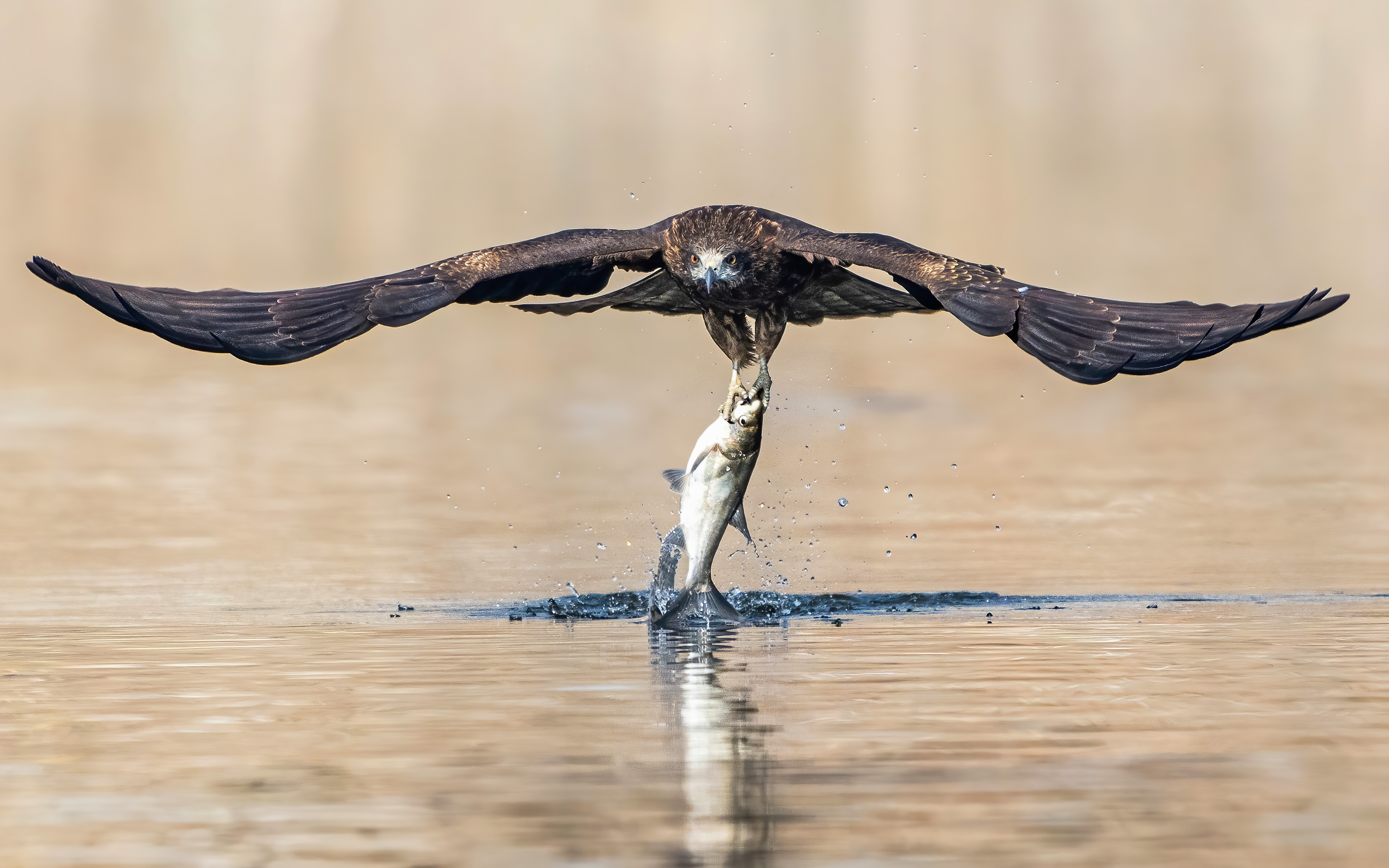
Black kite catching fish, Nepal

In winter, kites form large communal roosts. Flocks may fly about before settling at the roost. When migrating, the black kite has a greater propensity to form large flocks than other migratory raptors, particularly prior to making a crossing over water. In India, the subspecies govinda shows large seasonal fluctuations, with the highest numbers seen from July to October, after the monsoons, and it has been suggested that they make local movements in response to high rainfall.

=== Breeding ===
The breeding season of the black kite in India begins in winter (mainly January and February), the young birds fledging before the monsoons. The nest is a rough platform of twigs and sticks placed in a tree. Nest sites may be reused in subsequent years. European birds breed in summer. Birds in the Italian Alps tend to build their nest close to water in steep cliffs or tall trees. Nest orientation may be related to wind and rainfall. The nests may sometimes be decorated with bright materials such as white plastic and a study in Spain suggests that they may have a role in signalling to keep away other kites.

After pairing, the male frequently copulates with the female. Unguarded females may be approached by other males, and extra pair copulations are frequent. Males returning from a foraging trip will frequently copulate on return, as this increases the chances of his sperm fertilizing the eggs rather than a different male. Both the male and female take part in nest building, incubation and care of chicks.

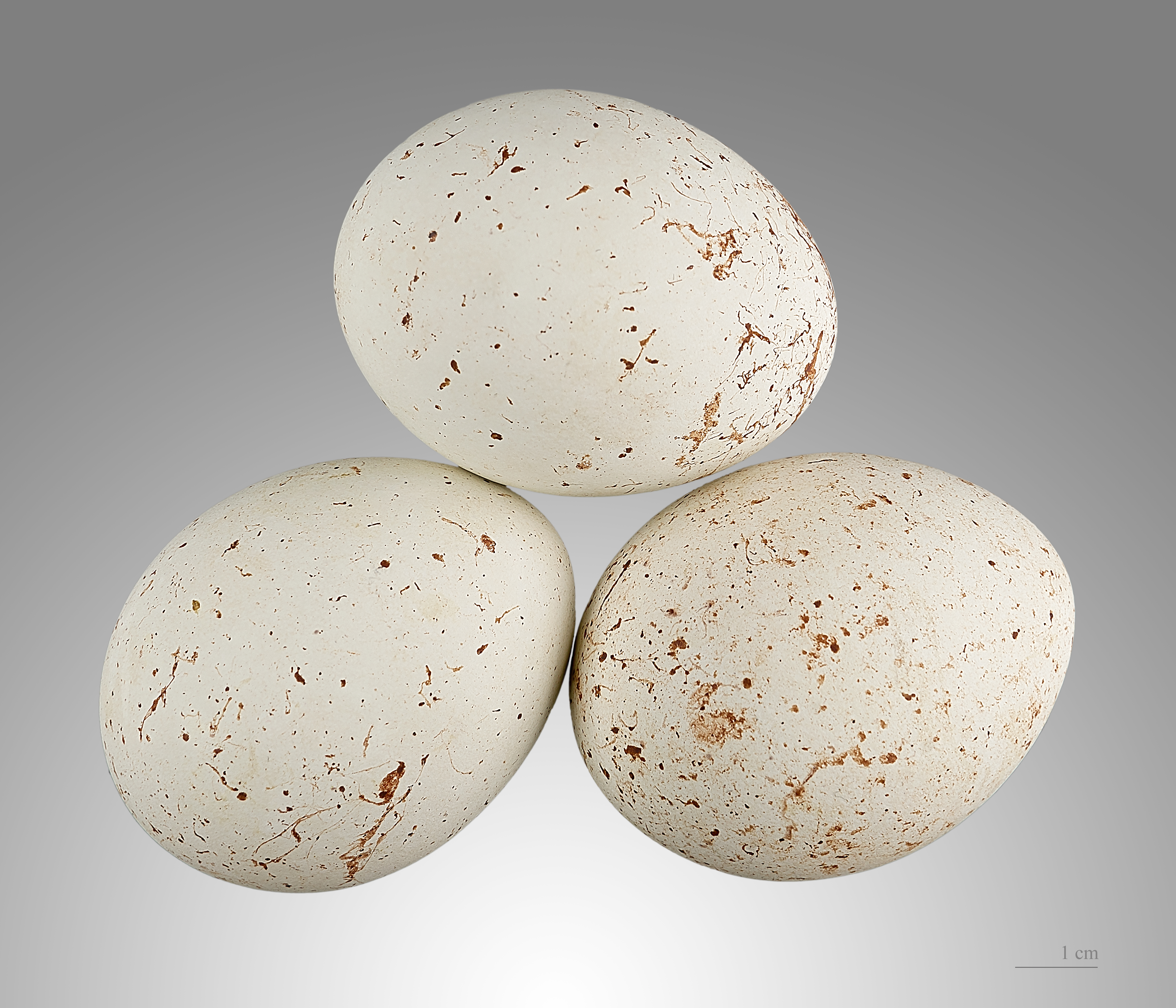
Eggs

The typical clutch size is 2 or sometimes 3 eggs. The incubation period varies from 30 to 34 days. Chicks of the Indian population stay at the nest for nearly two months. Chicks hatched later in European populations appear to fledge faster. The care of young by the parents also rapidly decreased with the need for adults to migrate. Siblings show aggression to each other and often the weaker chick may be killed, but parent birds were found to preferentially feed the smaller chicks in experimentally altered nests.

Newly hatched young have down (prepennae) which are sepia on the back and black around the eye and buff on the head, neck and underparts. This is replaced by brownish-gray second down (preplumulae). After 9–12 days, the second down appears on the whole body except the top of the head. Body feathers begin to appear after 18 to 22 days. The feathers on the head become noticeable from the 24th to 29th day. The nestlings initially feed on food fallen at the bottom of the nest and begin to tear flesh after 33–39 days. They are able to stand on their legs after 17–19 days and begin flapping their wings after 27–31 days. After 50 days, they begin to move to branches next to the nest. Birds are able to breed after their second year. Parent birds guard their nest and will dive aggressively at intruders. Humans who intrude the nest appear to be recognized by birds and singled out for dive attacks.

=== Mortality factors ===
Black-eared kites in Japan were found to accumulate nearly 70% of mercury accumulated from polluted food in the feathers, thus excreting it in the moult process. Black kites often perch on electric wires and are frequent victims of electrocution. Their habit of swooping to pick up dead rodents or other roadkill leads to collisions with vehicles. Instances of mass poisoning as a result of feeding on poisoned voles in agricultural fields have been noted. They are also a major nuisance at some airports, where their size makes them a significant birdstrike hazard.

As a large raptorial bird, the black kite has few natural predators. However, they do have a single serious predator: the Eurasian eagle-owl (Bubo bubo). The eagle-owl freely picks off kites of any age and eagle-owls were noted to precipitously decrease kite breeding success when nesting within kilometres of the kites in the Italian Alps. Like most bird species, they have parasites; several species of endoparasitic trematodes are known and some Digenea species that are transmitted via fishes.

Birds with abnormal development of a secondary upper mandible have been recorded in govinda and lineatus subspecies.
