= Shit on the Radio (Remember the Days) =

2001 single by Nelly Furtado

- Standard international artwork

Single by Nelly Furtado

from the album Whoa, Nelly!
- Released: December 3, 2001
- Studio: The Gymnasium (Toronto, Canada); Can-Am Recorders (Tarzana, Los Angeles)
- Genre: R&B
- Length: 3:55
- Label: DreamWorks
- Songwriter: Nelly Furtado
- Producers: Gerald Eaton; Brian West; Nelly Furtado

Nelly Furtado singles chronology
"Turn Off the Light" (2001)	"Shit on the Radio (Remember the Days)" (2001)	"Hey, Man!" (2002)

Music video
- "... On the Radio (Remember the Days)" on YouTube

"Shit on the Radio (Remember the Days)", censored as "...on the Radio (Remember the Days)", is the third official single from Canadian singer-songwriter Nelly Furtado's debut album, Whoa, Nelly!. For the single release, the song's album title, "Shit on the Radio (Remember the Days)", was censored, and the word "shit" was removed from the title and substituted on the cover art with "#*@!!".

Despite the success of Furtado's previous two singles, the song failed to chart on the US Billboard Hot 100 and began a string of singles for Furtado that failed to chart until "Promiscuous" in 2006. "...on the Radio (Remember the Days)" charted in other countries, entering the top 10 in Canada (No. 7), the Netherlands (No. 7), Portugal (No. 6), and New Zealand (No. 5).

== Background and writing ==
Furtado, who wrote the song in one session, said it is about the feelings of insecurity she experienced when hiding her desire to make pop music to fit in with her underground musical peers. "I could try to be cool and whatever, but why do I have to try?", she said. "Why can't I just be myself? The moment you make that step and say, 'I want to make pop music' is a big thing. But no matter what happens to me there'll always be someone going, 'Oh, her music sucks now because everyone likes it.' I feel that song a lot."

== Music video ==
The music video for "...on the Radio (Remember the Days)" was directed by Hype Williams and features fellow British Columbian recording artists Swollen Members. The video begins with a remix of the intro of the song, with Furtado writing in chalk the director's name and editor's name. Soon after Furtado begins listening to music with earmuffs and the camera is showing parts of the room Furtado is in. The lyrics begin to play and Furtado is singing on the bed with earmuffs. She gets up and picks up a radio and walks out of the house. Then, Furtado gets in a car while dancers start doing tricks in an alleyway. The second verse shows Furtado singing to the camera while driving a car and she ends up where the dancers are and starts to sing the chorus with them while dancing. The bridge shows Furtado lying in the grass holding a flower and singing upwards to the camera, and then shows her running up to the stage where there is a concert going on where she begins to sing the last part of the song. The concert crowd begins to shout "myself" while the music stops then begins again. The video ends with Furtado in quick 15 second flashes on a TV screen singing and dancing with the dancers at the concert. The underground version places Furtado in a wooded shed similar to the one in the "Turn Off the Light" underground video, and also leaning on a stone singing the song outdoors in a clearing.

== Track listings ==
UK CD maxi-single

1. "...on the Radio (Remember the Days)" – 3:54
2. "...on the Radio (Remember the Days)" (Carl H. Vocal Mix) – 5:26
3. "I'm Like a Bird" (Nelly vs. Asha Remix) – 4:54

UK cassette single

1. "...on the Radio (Remember the Days)" (semi-clean version)
2. "I'm Like a Bird" (Nelly vs. Asha Remix)

European CD single

1. "...on the Radio (Remember the Days)" (semi-clean version)
2. "...on the Radio (Remember the Days)" (album version)

European & Japanese CD maxi-single

1. "...on the Radio (Remember the Days)" (semi-clean version)
2. "...on the Radio (Remember the Days)" (album version)
3. "Turn Off the Light" (Timbaland remix featuring Ms. Jade and Timbaland)
4. "...on the Radio (Remember the Days)" (video)

Australian CD maxi-single

1. "...on the Radio (Remember the Days)" (semi-clean version) – 3:54
2. "...on the Radio (Remember the Days)" – 3:54
3. "Turn Off the Light" (Timbaland remix featuring Ms. Jade and Timbaland) – 4:40
4. "Turn Off the Light" (Decibel's After Midnight Mix) – 7:00
5. "...on the Radio (Remember the Days)" (video) – 4:00

== Credits and personnel ==
Credits are adapted from the Whoa, Nelly! album booklet.

Studios

- Recorded and engineered at The Gymnasium (Toronto, Canada) and Can-Am Recorders (Tarzana, Los Angeles)
- Mixed at Can-Am Recorders (Tarzana, Los Angeles)
- Mastered at Classic Sound (New York City)

Personnel

- Nelly Furtado – writing, lead vocals, background vocals, acoustic guitars, programming, production
- Brian West – acoustic guitars, production, programming, recording, engineering
- Lil' Jaz – scratches
- Gerald Eaton – programming, production
- Brad Haehnel – mixing, recording, engineering
- John Knupp – second engineering
- Scott Hull – mastering

== Charts ==
=== Weekly charts ===
Weekly chart performance "Shit on the Radio (Remember the Days)"
Chart (2001–2002)	Peak position
Australia (ARIA)	53
Austria (Ö3 Austria Top 40)	48
Belgium (Ultratop 50 Flanders)	38
Canada CHR (Nielsen BDS)	7
Denmark Airplay (Tracklisten)	14
Europe (Eurochart Hot 100)	98
Germany (GfK)	67
Ireland (IRMA)	22
Italy (FIMI)	28
Netherlands (Dutch Top 40)	7
Netherlands (Single Top 100)	23
New Zealand (Recorded Music NZ)	5
Portugal (AFP)	6
Romania (Romanian Top 100)	16
Scotland Singles (Official Charts)	19
Switzerland (Schweizer Hitparade)	43
UK Singles (Official Charts)	18
US Adult Pop Airplay (Billboard)	37
US Pop Airplay (Billboard)	34

=== Year-end charts ===
2001 year-end chart performance "Shit on the Radio (Remember the Days)"
Chart (2001)	Position
Canada Radio (Nielsen BDS)	59

2002 year-end chart performance "Shit on the Radio (Remember the Days)"
Chart (2002)	Position
Netherlands (Dutch Top 40)	74

== Release history ==
Release dates and formats for "Shit on the Radio (Remember the Days)"
Region	Date	Format(s)	Label	Ref.
Australia	December 3, 2001	CD	DreamWorks	
United Kingdom	January 7, 2002	Cassette; CD	DreamWorks	
United States	January 28, 2002	Contemporary hit radio; hot adult contemporary radio	DreamWorks	
Germany	February 11, 2002	CD	DreamWorks	
Japan	June 21, 2002	CD	DreamWorks	
