= Shite-hawk =

Slang term for the black kite and other scavenging birds of prey

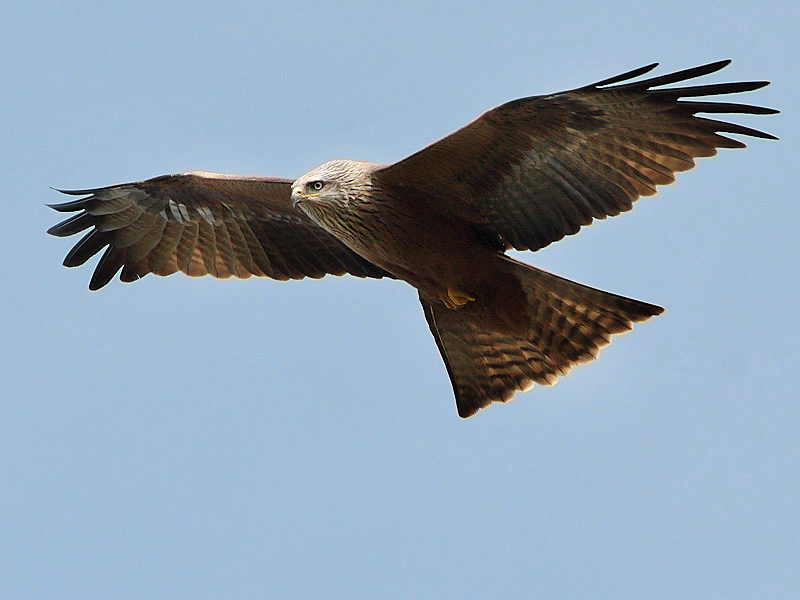
The black kite, known in military slang as the shite-hawk

Shite-hawk (also spelled shitehawk) or shit-hawk or shitty hawk is a slang name applied to various birds of prey that exhibit scavenging behaviour, originally and primarily the black kite, although the term has also been applied to other birds such as the herring gull. It is also a slang derogatory term for an unpleasant person.

== Origin of the term ==
The term "shite-hawk" is believed to have originated as military slang by the British Army in India and Egypt, as a derogatory term for the black kite (Milvus migrans), which was despised by soldiers for its habit of stealing food from their plates:

At the transit camp the British soldier normally made his acquaintance with the kite-hawk [i.e. black kite], known familiarly as the 'shite-hawk'. 'There used to be thousands of them,' remembers Charles Wright. 'When one drew one's food from the cook-house and went to take it across to the dining room to eat at the tables underneath the sheds, these kite-hawks would swoop down and take the lot off your plate if you weren't careful. So you had to walk waving your arms above the plate until you got it under cover.'

— Charles Allen, Plain Tales from the Raj

Eric Partridge, an etymologist, claimed that the term was used to refer to the vulture by the soldiers in the British Army in India during the period 1870–1947, although the earliest recorded use of the term in print in the Oxford English Dictionary is 1944. In recent years, in the United Kingdom, the term "shite-hawk" has also been applied to the herring gull (Larus argentatus), which is known for its mobbing and scavenging behaviour.

== Referring to the red kite ==
Although "shite-hawk" originally referred to the black kite in India and elsewhere, and British naturalists Mark Cocker and Richard Mabey explicitly note that the "red kite never suffered the indignity of its relative's nickname", in recent years, following the successful reintroduction of the red kite into Scotland and England during the 1990s, the term has also started to be used for the red kite in Britain, apparently due to confusion between the two species of kite. Thus, in 1999, Lord Burton announced in the House of Lords that "[p]ossibly one of the most highly protected birds today is the [red] kite, known by the British Army throughout the world as a shite-hawk".

In March 2011, BBC Radio 4 broadcast a radio programme called The Kestrel and Red Kite, in which presenter Rod Liddle repeatedly asserted that the red kite (Milvus milvus) was historically known as the shite-hawk in England. However, he provided no evidence for this assertion, and the only other references to the red kite being called a shite-hawk in medieval times are very recent, for example a historical novel published in 2011 (but set in 1513), and in a poem written by Christopher Hodgson (published 2005):

And in Medieval times, with waste piled publicly,
Its habit of scavenging in sewage
Earned it the sobriquet, "Shite hawk" — Red Kite by Christopher Hodgson

== Other uses ==
- Military badges depicting birds of prey are also sometimes referred to as shite-hawks. Examples include the eagle badge on the sleeves of the 4th Indian Division of the British Indian Army, and the eagle on the left breast pocket of members of Pathfinder squadrons in the Royal Air Force.
- The term "shitehawk" has also been used as a derogatory term for an offensive or unpleasant person, equivalent to the word "shit". For example: in 1997, the band Half Man Half Biscuit described the driver of a car parked on the pavement as "a thoughtless shitehawk" in the song "He Who Would Valium Take" on their album Voyage to the Bottom of the Road.
