= Ms. Jade =

American rapper (born 1979)

- Born: Chevon Young; August 3, 1986 (age 39)
- Origin: Philadelphia, Pennsylvania, U.S.
- Genres: Hip hop
- Occupations: Rapper, songwriter, actress
- Years active: 1995–present
- Labels: Fort Knocks, Atlantic

Chevon Young (born August 3, 1979), better known by the stage name Ms. Jade, is an American rapper from Philadelphia, Pennsylvania.

In 2002 she released her only album to date, Girl Interrupted, which featured the singles "Big Head", "Feel The Girl" and "Ching Ching".

In 2008, she released new music on her Myspace page, including "Cha Cha 2008" and "A Millie Freestyle". In 2009 she was featured in an interview with newfreemixtape.com, discussing her comeback.

She also was featured on Beyoncé's official remix to her hit single, "Diva", with Ciara.

In 2010 she released a video for her single "Blowin' Up" featuring Freeway. It is to be the first single from her new mixtape, "Str8 No Chaser".

== Discography ==
=== Studio albums ===
- Girl Interrupted (2002)

=== Singles ===
==== As lead artist ====
List of singles as a lead artist, with selected chart positions, showing year released and album name
Title	Year	Peak chart positions				Album
Title	Year	US	US R&B	US Rap	US Rhyth.	Album
"Big Head" (featuring Timbaland)	2002	—	106	—	—	Girl Interrupted
"Ching Ching" (featuring Nelly Furtado and Timbaland)	2002	114	41	22	23	Girl Interrupted
"Feel the Girl"	2002	92	52	22	—	Girl Interrupted
"—" denotes a recording that did not chart.

==== As featured artist ====
List of singles as a featured artist, with selected chart positions, showing year released and album name
Title	Year	Peak chart positions			Album
Title	Year	US	US R&B	US Rhyth.	Album
"Are We Cuttin'" (Pastor Troy featuring Ms. Jade)	2002	96	47	—	Universal Soldier
"Turn Off the Light" (Remix) (Nelly Furtado featuring Timbaland and Ms. Jade)	2002	—	52	4	"Turn Off the Light" single
"Sexual Healing" (Tweet featuring Ms. Jade)	2002	—	124	—	Southern Hummingbird
"Funky Fresh Dressed" (Missy Elliott featuring Ms. Jade)	2003	—	107	—	Under Construction
"Disco" (Slum Village featuring Raje Shwari and Ms. Jade)	2003	—	93	—	Trinity (Past, Present and Future)
"—" denotes a recording that did not chart.
