= Whoa, Nelly! =

2000 studio album by Nelly Furtado

- Standard edition cover

Studio album by Nelly Furtado
- Released: October 24, 2000
- Recorded: 1999–2000
- Studios: The Gymnasium; Iguana Studios; McClear Digital Studios (Toronto, Canada); Can-Am Studio (Tarzana, California); Metalworks Studios (Mississauga, Ontario, Canada)
- Genres: Pop; trip hop; worldbeat; rock
- Length: 47:06
- Languages: English; Portuguese
- Label: DreamWorks
- Producers: Gerald Eaton; Brian West; Nelly Furtado; Jon Levine

Nelly Furtado chronology
Whoa, Nelly! (2000)	Folklore (2003)

Singles from Whoa, Nelly!
- 1. "I'm Like a Bird" Released: September 25, 2000; 2. "Turn Off the Light" Released: July 2, 2001; 3. "Shit on the Radio (Remember the Days)" Released: December 3, 2001; 4. "Hey, Man!" Released: June 10, 2002

Whoa, Nelly! is the debut studio album by Canadian singer-songwriter Nelly Furtado, released in North America on October 24, 2000 by DreamWorks Records. Recording sessions for the album took place from 1999 to 2000. It peaked at number twenty-four on the US Billboard 200 chart, and received critical acclaim. It produced four singles: "I'm Like a Bird", "Turn Off the Light", "Shit on the Radio (Remember the Days)", and "Hey, Man!". The album spent seventy-eight weeks on the Billboard 200, and hit double-platinum status in the US in January 2002.

After the release of the album, Furtado headlined the Burn in the Spotlight Tour and appeared on Moby's Area:One tour. According to Maclean's magazine, Whoa, Nelly! has sold 5-6 million copies Worldwide as of 2006. The album also caught the eye of record producer Timbaland, who later signed Furtado to his record label.

== Background ==
After graduating from Mount Douglas Secondary School in 1996, Furtado moved from Victoria, British Columbia to Toronto to pursue music, working full-time at an alarm company. There, she met Tallis Newkirk of the hip hop group Plains of Fascination and contributed vocals to their 1996 album Join the Ranks before forming the trip-hop duo Nelstar with him. However, she left the group, feeling its style did not represent her voice or personality. In 1997, her performance at the Honey Jam talent show caught the attention of Gerald Eaton of The Philosopher Kings, who, along with Brian West, helped her produce a demo. This material led to her signing with DreamWorks Records in 1999, and her first single, "Party's Just Begun (Again)", appeared that year on the Brokedown Palace soundtrack.

== Composition ==
Whoa, Nelly combines elements of a large number of genres. Stephen Thomas Erlewine of AllMusic states that "much of the record sounds like folk-pop tinged with bossa nova" and describes the songs as "blends of pop, folk, dance, and Latin". According to Heidi Sherman from Spin "Furtado takes on mainstream urban pop, alternative folk, R&B-soul, and Brazilian samba on Whoa, Nelly!". Billboard notes that "Nelly Furtado sees no reason for separating rock guitars from pop melodies from R&B/hip hop beats from effervescent bossa nova". Other articles on Billboard describe Whoa, Nelly as a trip-pop and worldbeat/rock album.

== Critical reception ==
Professional ratings
Aggregate scores
Source	Rating
Metacritic	79/100
Review scores
Source	Rating
AllMusic	4/5 stars
Entertainment Weekly	A
The Guardian	3/5 stars
The Independent	3/5 stars
NME	6/10
Now	1/5 Ns
Q	3/5 stars
Rolling Stone	3.5/5 stars
Slant	4.5/5 stars
Yahoo! Music UK	8/10 stars

Whoa, Nelly! was well received by critics for its eccentric, yet intriguing instrumentations as well as Furtado's vocals. It currently holds a score of 79 from Metacritic. Critics noted that the sound of the album was strongly influenced by musicians who had traversed cultures and "the challenge of making heartfelt, emotional music that's upbeat and hopeful." David Browne from Entertainment Weekly gave Whoa, Nelly! a positive review, calling it a consistently engaging debut that blends R&B, world music, and electronic influences into a distinctive pop style. He highlighted tracks such as "I'm Like a Bird" and "Turn Off the Light" as standout examples of its melodic and inventive production. Overall, he praised the album's energy and individuality as setting it apart from mainstream pop. Sal Cinquemani from Slant magazine called it "a delightful and refreshing antidote to the army of "pop princesses" and rap-metal bands that had taken over popular music at the turn of the millennium." Stephen Thomas Erlewine of AllMusic also gave a positive review while commenting that "Furtado is a restless vocalist, skitting and scatting with abandon, spitting out rapid repetitions, bending notes, and frequently indulging in melismas," also stating that "Whoa, Nelly! unfolds as a rewarding, promising debut."

Writing for Rolling Stone, James Hunter described Whoa, Nelly! as "wild-ass pop go-go, filled with songs that pursue adventure yet could still make the hit parades." Joshua Klein from The A.V. Club characterized Whoa, Nelly! as a cosmopolitan debut blending global influences into a genre-defying pop sound. He highlighted its mix of acoustic, hip-hop, R&B, and world music elements on tracks such as "Hey, Man!" and "Shit On the Radio (Remember the Days)." Overall, he called it a "casually eccentric collection of beguiling modern music" that resists categorization. Caroline Sullivan from The Guardian noted Furtado's "thinnish voice" as a potential drawback, but ultimately acknowledged her strong songwriting ability and genre range on Whoa, Nelly! as outweighing these criticisms, while Yahoo! Music UK editor Nichola Browne viewed the album as an impressive and sparkling debut despite some repetition and weaker closing tracks. Billboard concluded: "Rich with feisty rhythms and creative originality, Whoa, Nelly! is one very special debut." Q listed Whoa, Nelly! as one of the best 50 albums of 2001. Standing out as a rare strongly negative assessment among generally more favorable reviews, Matt Galloway from Now called the album "torturously dull" and criticizing it as overly polished, generic pop with weak songwriting despite occasional interesting beats.

=== Accolades ===
As a result of critical acclaim, the album received four nominations at the 44th Annual Grammy Awards ceremony in on 27 February 2002. The album itself received a nomination for Best Pop Vocal Album, while Furtado herself was nominated for Best New Artist as well as Song of the Year and Best Female Pop Vocal Performance for "I'm Like a Bird", in which she won the latter.

== Commercial performance ==
Whoa, Nelly! was a major international breakthrough, achieving strong chart positions and sustained commercial success across multiple regions, with worldwide sales estimated at approximately 5–6 million copies. The album peaked at number 2 on both the Canadian Albums Chart and the UK Albums Chart, and reached the top 10 in several countries including Australia, New Zealand, Norway, Ireland, Switzerland, and Portugal.

Across Europe, Whoa, Nelly! performed strongly, reaching number 8 on the European Top 100 Albums chart and charting within the top 20 in markets such as Germany, Italy, the Netherlands, Belgium, Sweden, and Denmark. In the United States, the album debuted with first-week sales of 4,087 copies and entered the Billboard 200 at number 190 in January 2001. Supported by growing radio airplay, sales increased significantly over time, rising to approximately 12,000 copies per week by the end of 2000 and up to 55,000 copies per week by the end of 2001, eventually peaking at number 24 on the chart.

The album also demonstrated strong year-end performance, appearing on multiple charts across 2001 and 2002, including Canada, the United States, the United Kingdom, Germany, Switzerland, and the European Top 100. It was ranked among the top 20 worldwide albums of 2001 by International Federation of the Phonographic Industry (IFPI). In terms of certifications, Whoa, Nelly! achieved multi-platinum status in several major markets, including 4× Platinum in Canada and 2× Platinum in both the United Kingdom and the United States. It was also certified 2× Platinum in Australia, 3× Platinum in New Zealand, and received additional Gold and Platinum certifications across Europe and other international territories.

== Track listing ==
All tracks produced by Nelly Furtado, Gerald Eaton and Brian West, except for "Well, Well", which is produced by Furtado and Jon Levine.

Whoa, Nelly!
No.	Title	Writer(s)	Length
1.	"Hey, Man!"	Furtado	4:10
2.	"Shit on the Radio (Remember the Days)"	Furtado	3:54
3.	"Baby Girl"	Furtado; Eaton; West	3:46
4.	"Legend"	Furtado; Eaton; West	3:35
5.	"I'm Like a Bird"	Furtado	4:03
6.	"Turn Off the Light"	Furtado	4:36
7.	"Trynna Finda Way"	Furtado; Eaton; West	3:32
8.	"Party"	Furtado; Eaton; West	4:02
9.	"Well, Well"	Furtado	2:59
10.	"My Love Grows Deeper Part 1"	Furtado; Eaton; West	4:21
11.	"I Will Make U Cry"	Furtado	3:59
12.	"Scared of You"	Furtado	6:09
Total length:			47:06

Expanded edition
No.	Title	Writer(s)	Length
13.	"I'm Like a Bird" (acoustic version)		3:56
14.	"My Love Grows Deeper" (Non-LP version)	Furtado; Eaton; West	4:54
15.	"I Feel You" (featuring Esthero)	Furtado; Eaton; West	4:09
16.	"I'm Like a Bird" (Nelly vs. Asha Remix)		5:36
17.	"Shit on the Radio (Remember the Days)" (Dan the Automator Mix)		4:35
18.	"Baby Girl" (live at The Forum)		4:37
19.	"Party" (Reprise)		4:54
20.	"Turn Off the Light" (Timbaland Full Mix Version)		4:35
21.	"I'm Like a Bird" (Junior Vasquez Club Anthem)		10:19
22.	"Onde Estás"	Furtado	4:13

=== Notes ===
- Track 22 originally appeared on international editions. It was later added to standard edition vinyl pressings.
- Tracks 14 and 15 originally appeared on the UK special edition, alongside the music video for track 5.
- Japanese edition pressings include the Choroni mix of track 8. Whoa, Nelly! +1 pressings additionally include Gavo's Martini Bar Mix of track 5.
- European special edition pressings include music videos for tracks 5 and 6.
- Asian special edition pressings include a bonus disc containing tracks 13, 16, and 17, alongside Yogi's Sunshine Reggae Mix of track 5, and music videos for tracks 1, 2, 5, and 6.
- 2008 special edition pressings include a bonus disc containing tracks 13–17.
- Expanded edition excludes tracks 15, 16, 18, and 21 on vinyl pressings.

Sample credits

- "Hey, Man!" contains a sample from "White Man Sleeps (Second Movement)" by Kronos Quartet.
- "My Love Grows Deeper Part 1" contains a sample from "Stride with Ease" by Jeff Tyzik and a sample from "Eli Eli" by Johnny Mathis.

== Personnel ==
Credits are adapted from the liner notes of Whoa, Nelly!.

- Nelly Furtado – lead and background vocals, acoustic guitar, songwriting
- Field – bass guitar, acoustic guitar
- Track – tambourine, background vocals, quica, shakers
- Rabbi – keyboards, piano, synthesizer
- Curt Bisquera – drums
- Lil' Jaz – turntables
- Johnny "The American" – electric guitar
- Bob Ludwig – mastering
- Rick Waychesko – trumpet, fluglehorn
- Mike Elizondo – bass guitar, double bass
- Victor Rebelo – percussion, berimbau, shaker
- Camara Kambon – piano
- Martin Tillmann – cello
- James McCollum – guitar
- Russ Miller – drums
- Allan Molnar – vibraphone
- Brad Haehnel – shaker
- Roberto Occhipinti – bass guitar
- Luis Orbegoso – congas, toms
- Joe "Public" Allen – trumpet
- Nuno Cristo – guitar
- Alex Rebelo – rhythm guitar
- Daniel Stone – udu, shaker, triangle
- Martin Tillmann – cello

== Charts ==
=== Weekly charts ===
2000–2002 weekly chart performance
Chart	Peak position
Australian Albums (ARIA)	4
Austrian Albums (Ö3 Austria)	37
Belgian Albums (Ultratop Flanders)	20
Belgian Albums (Ultratop Wallonia)	40
Canadian Albums (Billboard)	2
Danish Albums (Hitlisten)	18
Dutch Albums (Album Top 100)	10
European Top 100 Albums (Music & Media)	8
Finnish Albums (Suomen virallinen lista)	37
French Albums (SNEP)	46
German Albums (Offizielle Top 100)	14
Hungarian Albums (MAHASZ)	38
Irish Albums (IRMA)	6
Italian Albums (FIMI)	14
Japanese Albums (Oricon) +1 edition	95
New Zealand Albums (RMNZ)	5
Norwegian Albums (VG-lista)	4
Polish Albums (ZPAV)	41
Portuguese Albums (AFP)	4
Scottish Albums (Official Charts)	6
South African Albums (RISA)	8
Swedish Albums (Sverigetopplistan)	15
Swiss Albums (Schweizer Hitparade)	6
UK Albums (Official Charts)	2
US Billboard 200	24

=== Year-end charts ===
2000 year-end chart performance
Chart	Position
Canadian Albums (Nielsen SoundScan)	82

2001 year-end chart performance
Chart	Position
Australian Albums (ARIA)	16
Canadian Albums (Nielsen SoundScan)	9
Dutch Albums (MegaCharts)	59
European Top 100 Albums (Music & Media)	33
German Albums (Offizielle Top 100)	46
Swedish Albums (Sverigetopplistan)	78
Swiss Albums (Schweizer Hitparade)	26
UK Albums (OCC)	26
US Billboard 200	51
Worldwide Albums (IFPI)	20

2002 year-end chart performance
Chart	Position
Canadian Albums (Nielsen SoundScan)	131
UK Albums (OCC)	117

== Certifications ==
Certifications and sales
Region	Certification	Certified units/sales
Australia (ARIA)	2× Platinum	140,000^{^}
Belgium (BRMA)	Gold	25,000^{*}
Canada (Music Canada)	4× Platinum	400,000^{^}
Denmark (IFPI Danmark)	Gold	25,000^{^}
Germany (BVMI)	Gold	150,000^{^}
Mexico (AMPROFON)	Gold	110,000
Netherlands (NVPI)	Gold	40,000^{^}
New Zealand (RMNZ)	3× Platinum	45,000^{^}
Norway (IFPI Norway)	Gold	25,000^{*}
South Africa (RISA)	2× Platinum	100,000^{*}
Switzerland (IFPI Switzerland)	Platinum	50,000^{^}
United Kingdom (BPI)	2× Platinum	667,000
United States (RIAA)	2× Platinum	2,470,000
Summaries
Europe (IFPI)	Platinum	1,000,000^{*}
Worldwide	—	6,000,000
^{*} Sales figures based on certification alone.^{^} Shipments figures based on certification alone.

== Release history ==
Release dates and formats
Region	Date	Edition(s)	Format(s)	Label(s)	Ref.
Canada	October 24, 2000	Standard	CD	Universal	
United States	October 24, 2000	Standard	CD	DreamWorks	
Japan	November 22, 2000	Standard	CD	Universal	
United Kingdom	March 12, 2001	Standard	CD	DreamWorks	
Germany	May 7, 2001	Standard	CD	Universal	
United Kingdom	May 14, 2001	Special	Enhanced CD	DreamWorks	
Japan	February 21, 2002	+1	CD	Universal	
Germany	March 18, 2002	Special	Enhanced CD	Universal	
United States	May 20, 2008	2008 special	Double CD; digital download	Geffen	
Canada	May 27, 2008	2008 special	Double CD; digital download	Universal	
Germany	May 30, 2008	2008 special	Double CD; digital download	Universal	
Various	October 23, 2020	Expanded	Digital download; streaming	Geffen	
Various	August 9, 2024	Standard; expanded	Vinyl	Geffen; UM^{e}	
