= I'm Like a Bird =

2000 single by Nelly Furtado

- One variant of the standard artwork

Single by Nelly Furtado

from the album Whoa, Nelly!
- Released: September 25, 2000
- Studio: The Gymnasium (Toronto, Canada); Can-Am Recorders (Tarzana, Los Angeles)
- Genre: Folk-pop
- Length: 4:03
- Label: DreamWorks
- Songwriter: Nelly Furtado
- Producers: Gerald Eaton; Brian West; Nelly Furtado

Nelly Furtado singles chronology
"Party's Just Begun (Again)" (1999)	"I'm Like a Bird" (2000)	"Turn Off the Light" (2001)

Music video
- "I'm Like a Bird" on YouTube

"I'm Like a Bird" is a song by Canadian singer-songwriter Nelly Furtado. It was written by Furtado and produced by Gerald Eaton and Brian West for her debut studio album, Whoa, Nelly! (2000). Inspired by her first serious relationship in her early twenties, the folk-pop song reflects her experiences of isolation and emotional uncertainty while living alone in Los Angeles. Composed largely on guitar, much of the track was written in a brief, inspired session, which Furtado later described as an unexpected creative breakthrough.

Released as the album's first single on September 25, 2000, the song was widely praised for Furtado's distinctive vocals and catchy melody. It became a worldwide hit the following year and marked Furtado's global breakthrough, reaching top-ten charts worldwide and earning multiple platinum certifications. Initially not her first choice, the pop-oriented single became a major commercial success, reaching number nine on the US Billboard Hot 100 and number one in Portugal.

"I'm Like a Bird" received widespread recognition, winning multiple awards, including the Grammy Award for Best Female Pop Vocal Performance, the Juno Award for Single of the Year, and several honors from the MuchMusic Video Awards and SOCAN Awards, while also earning a nomination for Song of the Year at the 44th Annual Grammy Awards. The song's music video, directed by Francis Lawrence, features Furtado singing in mid-air with computer-generated birds and trees before falling into a large crowd.

== Background ==
"I'm Like a Bird" was written by Furtado and produced by Gerald Eaton and Brian West. The song was inspired by Furtado's first serious relationship in her early twenties. At the time, she was living alone in Los Angeles while completing Whoa, Nelly!, having previously recorded much of it in Canada. The isolation she experienced, combined with feelings of emotional uncertainty within the relationship, informed the song's themes of independence and vulnerability. Furtado composed much of "I'm Like a Bird" on guitar after earlier songwriting attempts that day proved unsuccessful, with much of it completed in "in like 20 minutes." She later described its creation as an unexpected breakthrough that emerged from a period of creative and personal uncertainty.

Although rooted in personal experience, Furtado acknowledged that "I'm Like a Bird" lends itself to multiple interpretations. In an interview with MTV, she noted that while the song initially appears to be a love song, its themes of restlessness and transience could extend beyond romance. She reflected that the idea of being a nomad and embracing a wandering spirit was central to her identity, suggesting the lyrics could resonate in broader contexts. In 2006, Furtado also commented on the song's cultural longevity, expressing appreciation for hearing it performed at karaoke and by cover bands. She described it as a "hairbrush song" — one people sing into a mirror — and remarked that she felt fortunate to have created a track with such enduring and personal appeal.

== Composition ==
"I'm Like a Bird" is composed common time in the key of B♭ major. The song moves at 90 beats per minute, and Furtado's voice spans around two octaves, from F_{3} to F_{5}. It is written in verse-chorus form, with a bridge before the third chorus.

== Critical reception ==
"I'm Like a Bird" received widespread acclaim from music critics. Timothy Mark from NME described "I'm Like a Bird" as "naggingly infectious" with an urban-influenced feel and praised Furtado's distinctive voice, comparing it to a mix of Erykah Badu and Björk, while noting its memorable quality despite somewhat whimsical lyrics. Rolling Stone critic James Hunter found that "I'm Like a Bird" was a "sad love song that flies off into pop gorgeousness," while Slant Magazine's Sal Cinquemani called the song "irresistible." David Browne from Entertainment Weekly noted that the song "takes the old 'it's not you, it's me' stance on breaking up a relationship, but the song [...] leaps from a seesawing orchestral intro into a shimmery flow." In a retrospective review, CBC Music stated about the song: "Alongside the hopeful bounciness of the track, Furtado's carefree lyrics were lowkey signalling that the 22-year-old singer was doing things her way, and in her time — a mantra that continues to be her trademark more than two decades later."

=== Accolades ===
"I'm Like a Bird" received major industry recognition for its songwriting and performance. At the 2002 Grammy Awards, the song won Best Female Pop Vocal Performance and was nominated for Song of the Year. It also won Single of the Year at the 2001 Juno Awards and Choice Canadian Song at the 2002 Canadian Music Awards. Internationally, "I'm Like a Bird" won Most Performed Songs at the ASCAP Pop Music Awards in 2002 and earned a nomination for Most Performed Foreign Work at the APRA Music Awards. At the SOCAN Awards, it won awards for International Achievement and Pop/Rock Music in 2002, and later received a 400,000 Spins Award at the BDSCertified Spin Awards in 2004.

== Commercial performance ==
"I'm Like a Bird" became a global breakthrough hit for Nelly Furtado, achieving strong chart success and multi-platinum certifications across several continents. Although Furtado initially favored "Shit on the Radio (Remember the Days)" as her debut single, believing it better represented her artistic identity, Mo Ostin of DreamWorks Records advocated for the more pop-oriented "I'm Like a Bird," considering it the stronger commercial choice. Released in North America in September 2000, the single reached number 19 on the RPM Top Singles chart and was certified 2× Platinum by Music Canada in February 2024 for 160,000 units. In the United States, "I'm Like a Bird" peaked at number nine on the Billboard Hot 100 and achieved significant airplay success, reaching number six on Pop Airplay. In September 2022, the Recording Industry Association of America (RIAA) certified the single Platinum for sales of one million units.

Elsewhere, the single was released between February and March 2001. In Oceania, "I'm Like a Bird" was particularly successful. It peaked at number two in both Australia and New Zealand. In Australia, it ranked number seven on the 2001 year-end chart and was certified 2× Platinum for 140,000 shipments. In New Zealand, it placed at number eight on the year-end chart and earned a 2× Platinum certification for 60,000 units. The song achieved its highest European chart position in Portugal, where it reached number one. Elsewhere, it peaked inside the top ten on the Dutch Top 40 and within the top 20 in Poland (number eight), Denmark (number 13), Italy and Sweden (number 16), Norway and Switzerland (number 17) and Flanders (number 16) and Wallonia (number 19). In the United Kingdom, it peaked at number five on the UK Singles Chart. It was later certified Platinum by the British Phonographic Industry (BPI) for exceeding 600,000 units. Ireland also embraced the single, where it reached number four and placed at number 29 on the year-end chart. In Denmark, it was certified Gold for 45,000 units.

== Music video ==
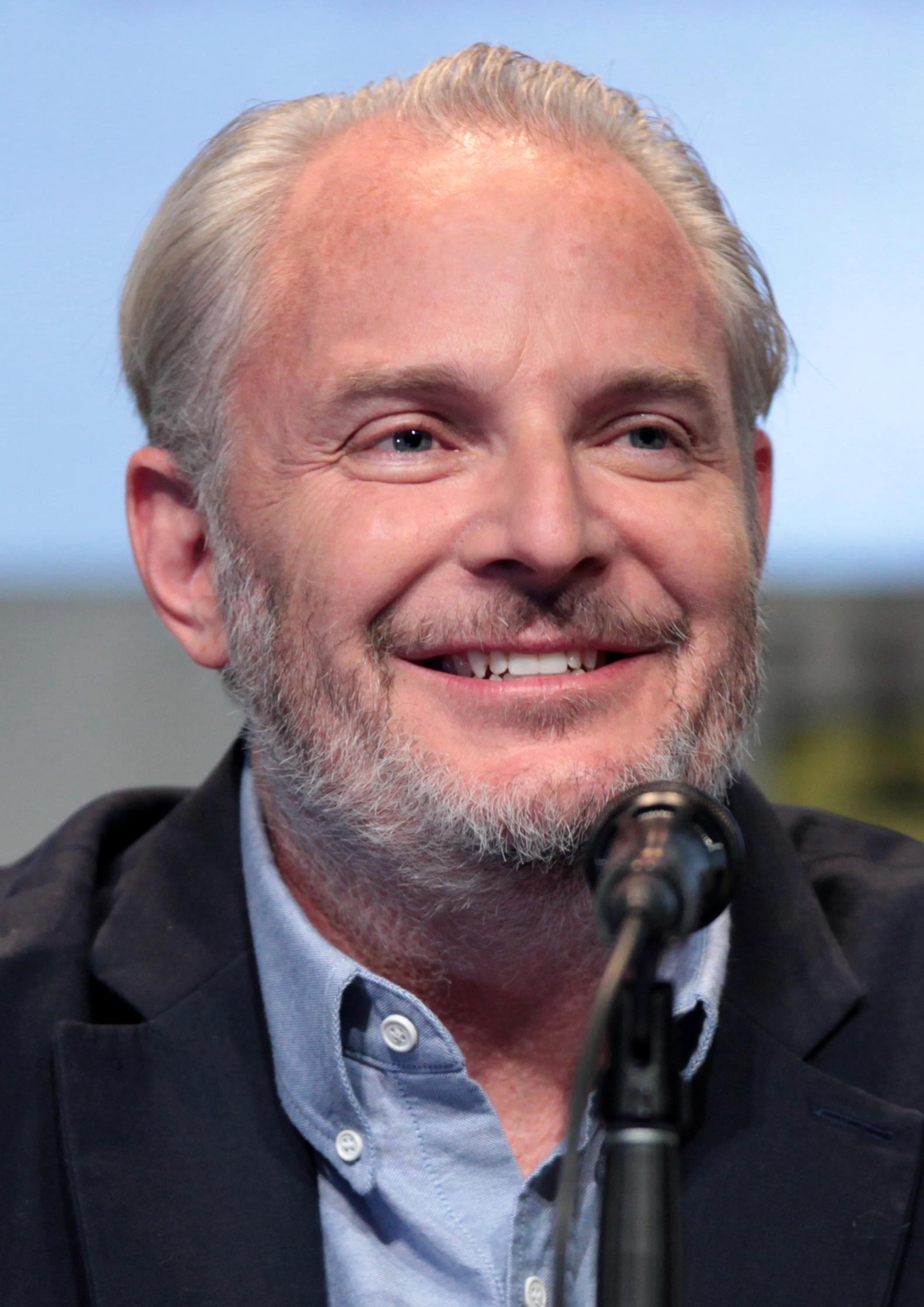
Filmmaker Francis Lawrence directed the video for "I'm Like a Bird."

The music video for "I'm Like a Bird" was directed by Francis Lawrence, and features heavy use of CGI. The video begins in the sky where the camera slowly pans down onto Furtado, who is lying in the grass. It then shows her singing on a tree trunk in mid-air. In the chorus she gets up and starts singing to the camera while birds are flying around her. The second verse shows her sitting in mid-air in a forest, while singing to the camera. The chorus consists of flashes of Furtado singing in mid-air, again, while leaning on the tree trunk. During the bridge she is singing to a bug while her eyes change colour, which changes the bug's color accordingly. The conclusion of the video shows her falling backwards from a branch into a crowd as she sings the final chorus of the song. The last shot pans out to reveal a crowd of tens of thousands.

=== Accolades ===
The visuals won Best New Artist Pop Clip at the 2001 Billboard Music Video Awards and received multiple nominations at the MuchMusic Video Awards, winning the MuchMoreMusic Award and People's Choice: Favourite Canadian Artist, while being nominated for International Video of the Year – Artist and People's Choice: Favourite Canadian Video. Additionally, the music video for "I'm Like a Bird" earned a nomination for Best International Video at the Viva Comet Awards in 2001.

== Track listings ==
Canadian and European 2-track CD single; UK cassette single
No.	Title	Length
1.	"I'm Like a Bird" (LP version)	4:03
2.	"Party (Reprise)" (non-LP version)	4:55

UK CD maxi-single
No.	Title	Length
1.	"I'm Like a Bird" (LP version)	4:02
2.	"Party (Reprise)" (non-LP version)	4:53
3.	"My Love Grows Deeper" (non-LP version)	4:54
4.	"I'm Like a Bird" (video)

Australasian and European CD maxi-single
No.	Title	Length
1.	"I'm Like a Bird" (LP version)	4:03
2.	"Party (Reprise)" (non-LP version)	4:55
3.	"I Feel You" (featuring Esthero)	4:08
4.	"My Love Grows Deeper" (non-LP version)	4:54

== Credits and personnel ==
Credits are adapted from the Whoa, Nelly! album booklet.

Studios

- Recorded and engineered at The Gymnasium (Toronto, Canada) and Can-Am Recorders (Tarzana, Los Angeles)
- Mixed at Can-Am Recorders (Tarzana, Los Angeles)
- Mastered at Classic Sound (New York City)

Personnel

- Nelly Furtado – writing, lead vocals, background vocals, production
- Gerald Eaton – micro-synth guitar, programming, production
- Mike Elizondo – bass guitar
- Russ Miller – drums
- Allan Molnar – vibraphone
- Brian West – production, programming, recording, engineering
- Brad Haehnel – pepper shaker, mixing, recording, engineering
- John Knupp – second engineering
- Scott Hull – mastering

== Charts ==
=== Weekly charts ===
Weekly chart performance for "I'm Like a Bird"
Chart (2000–2001)	Peak position
Australia (ARIA)	2
Austria (Ö3 Austria Top 40)	41
Belgium (Ultratop 50 Flanders)	16
Belgium (Ultratop 50 Wallonia)	19
Canada Top Singles (RPM)	19 (Note: "I'm Like a Bird" reached number 19 when RPM ceased publication in November 2000.)
Canada Adult Contemporary (RPM)	65 (Note: "I'm Like a Bird" reached number 65 when RPM ceased publication in November 2000.)
Canada CHR (Nielsen BDS)	3
Denmark (Tracklisten)	13
Europe (Eurochart Hot 100)	15
France (SNEP)	33
Germany (GfK)	41
Ireland (IRMA)	4
Italy (FIMI)	16
Netherlands (Dutch Top 40)	4
Netherlands (Single Top 100)	8
New Zealand (Recorded Music NZ)	2
Norway (VG-lista)	17
Poland Airplay (Music & Media)	8
Portugal (AFP)	1
Romania (Romanian Top 100)	24
Scottish Singles Sales (Official Charts)	3
Sweden (Sverigetopplistan)	16
Switzerland (Schweizer Hitparade)	17
UK Singles (Official Charts)	5
US Billboard Hot 100	9
US Adult Contemporary (Billboard)	26
US Adult Pop Airplay (Billboard)	5
US Pop Airplay (Billboard)	6

=== Year-end charts ===
2001 year-end chart performance for "I'm Like a Bird"
Chart (2001)	Position
Australia (ARIA)	7
Belgium (Ultratop 50 Flanders)	88
Belgium (Ultratop 50 Wallonia)	77
Brazil Airplay (Crowley)	9
Canada (Nielsen SoundScan)	147
Canada Radio (Nielsen BDS)	8
Europe (Eurochart Hot 100)	57
France (SNEP)	92
Ireland (IRMA)	29
Netherlands (Dutch Top 40)	25
Netherlands (Single Top 100)	49
New Zealand (RIANZ)	8
Romania (Romanian Top 100)	61
Sweden (Hitlistan)	72
Switzerland (Schweizer Hitparade)	86
UK Singles (OCC)	31
US Billboard Hot 100	43
US Adult Top 40 (Billboard)	11
US Mainstream Top 40 (Billboard)	23

2022 year-end chart performance for "I'm Like a Bird"
Chart (2002)	Position
Canada Radio (Nielsen BDS)	97

2025 year-end chart performance for "I'm Like a Bird"
Chart (2025)	Position
Argentina Anglo Airplay (Monitor Latino)	94

== Certifications ==
Certifications and sales for "I'm Like a Bird"
Region	Certification	Certified units/sales
Australia (ARIA)	2× Platinum	140,000^{^}
Canada (Music Canada)	2× Platinum	160,000^{‡}
Denmark (IFPI Danmark)	Gold	45,000^{‡}
New Zealand (RMNZ)	2× Platinum	60,000^{‡}
United Kingdom (BPI)	Platinum	600,000^{‡}
United States (RIAA)	Platinum	1,000,000^{‡}
^{^} Shipments figures based on certification alone.^{‡} Sales+streaming figures based on certification alone.

== Release history ==
Release dates and formats for "I'm Like a Bird"
Region	Date	Format(s)	Label	Ref(s).
United States	September 25, 2000	Hot adult contemporary; modern adult contemporary radio	DreamWorks	
United States	September 26, 2000	Contemporary hit radio	DreamWorks	
Australia	February 19, 2001	CD single	DreamWorks	
United Kingdom	February 26, 2001	CD single	Polydor	
Germany	March 5, 2001	CD single	Universal	
