= Turn Off the Light =

2001 single by Nelly Furtado

- International retail artwork, also used for enhanced CD release and one of US promotional materials

Single by Nelly Furtado

from the album Whoa, Nelly!
- B-side: "I'm Like a Bird" (acoustic)
- Released: 2 July 2001
- Studio: The Gymnasium (Toronto, Canada); Can-Am Recorders (Tarzana, Los Angeles)
- Genre: Pop; trip hop; blues rock
- Length: 4:36 (album version); 3:36 (radio edit)
- Label: DreamWorks
- Songwriter: Nelly Furtado
- Producers: Gerald Eaton; Brian West; Nelly Furtado

Nelly Furtado singles chronology
"I'm Like a Bird" (2000)	"Turn Off the Light" (2001)	"Shit on the Radio (Remember the Days)" (2001)

Music video
- "Turn Off the Light" on YouTube

"Turn Off the Light" is a song by Canadian singer-songwriter Nelly Furtado from her debut studio album, Whoa, Nelly! (2000). Written by Furtado, and produced by Gerald Eaton, Brian West, and Furtado, the song was released as the album's second single on 2 July 2001, reaching number one in New Zealand, Portugal, and Romania, as well peaking within the top 10 in several other countries, including Australia, the United Kingdom, and the United States.

== Background ==
"Turn Off the Light" was written by Furtado along with Gerald Eaton and Brian West. Furtado has cited a song by the Canadian band Big Sugar as inspiration for the song, describing it as a "real song" that reflects her own moments of vulnerability: although she may seem independent, she experiences loneliness like anyone else, and the catchy, hook-driven chorus helps communicate that authenticity. She has also noted that the song's guitar chords are similar to those in English rock band Oasis' 1995 song "Wonderwall," reflecting her early influences and experimentation with the instrument. In discussing parent album Whoa, Nelly!, Furtado explained that "Turn Off the Light" exemplifies the record’s sound, which blends hip-hop, pop, and international influences.

== Chart performance ==
In New Zealand, "Turn Off the Light" became Furtado's first number-one single and stayed on the RIANZ Singles Chart for 27 weeks. "Turn Off the Light" was certified gold by the Recording Industry Association of New Zealand (RIANZ) for sales greater than 5,000 copies. The song became the second-most successful song of New Zealand in 2001, behind Craig David's "Walking Away". "Turn Off the Light" peaked at number five on the US Billboard Hot 100 on 10 November 2001. A remix featuring rappers Ms. Jade and Timbaland was also released, and a dance remix topped the Billboard Dance Club Play chart. In Australia, although the song peaked at number seven, it remained in the top 50 for 21 weeks and was certified platinum for sales exceeding 70,000 copies. The song debuted and peaked at number four on the UK Singles Chart, becoming Furtado's second top-five single there, and reached number two on the UK R&B Singles Chart.

== Music video ==
There are two music videos for "Turn Off the Light": the underground version and the regular version.

The regular version of the music video was directed by Sophie Muller and filmed on May 25, 2001, at Central Plaza in Chinatown in Los Angeles, California. Furtado worked closely with Muller on the concept, emphasizing that the two "totally collaborated and brainstormed so much and organized the whole thing, every last detail." She explained that she wanted the visual to mirror the song’s stylistic diversity, stating, "I wanted the video to reflect the eclecticism of the music, and it really does." In an effort to engage directly with her audience, Furtado invited fans to appear as extras in the video. Through her official website, she encouraged interested participants to submit a photograph via email for consideration, noting that involvement would be voluntary and offered "no compensation [...] other than personal gratification." Furtado's wardrobe in the video was largely influenced by Gwen Stefani.

The music video showcases a multicultural dreamscape that reflects Furtado's Portuguese heritage and features scenes filmed in Chinatown. It opens in a swamp, where Furtado sings while swimmers dance around her. At a temple, she performs surrounded by dancers who join in during the chorus. During the bridge, she appears in an old house, singing and playing guitar with the flag of the Azores displayed behind her and on her instrument. These shots are intercut with a DJ performing and dancers wearing skirts reminiscent of Sufi whirling. The video concludes with Furtado returning to the temple, sharing a quiet moment as she eats noodles.

The underground video features Furtado playing the guitar in a wooden shed, wearing a white top and jeans. She is also seen buying flowers. Behind the scenes footage of the photoshoot for the Whoa, Nelly! cover is interwoven throughout the video.

== Track listings ==
UK CD maxi-single

1. "Turn Off the Light"
2. "Turn Off the Light" (remix featuring Ms. Jade and Timbaland)
3. "I'm Like a Bird" (acoustic version)
4. "Turn Off the Light" (video)

UK 12-inch single

A1. "Turn Off the Light" (remix featuring Ms. Jade and Timbaland)
A2. "Turn Off the Light" (So Solid Crew remix)
B1. "Turn Off the Light" (album version)
B2. "Turn Off the Light" (Sunshine Reggae mix)

UK cassette single and European CD single

1. "Turn Off the Light" (radio edit) – 3:36
2. "I'm Like a Bird" (acoustic version) – 3:50

Australasian and European CD maxi-single

1. "Turn Off the Light" (radio edit)
2. "Turn Off the Light" (Sunshine Reggae mix)
3. "I'm Like a Bird" (acoustic)
4. "Turn Off the Light" (underground video)

== Credits and personnel ==
Credits are adapted from the Whoa, Nelly! album booklet.

Studios

- Recorded and engineered at The Gymnasium (Toronto, Canada) and Can-Am Recorders (Tarzana, Los Angeles)
- Mixed at Can-Am Recorders (Tarzana, Los Angeles)
- Mastered at Classic Sound (New York City)

Personnel

- Nelly Furtado – writing, lead vocals, background vocals, programming, production
- Gerald Eaton – additional background vocals, programming, production
- James McCollum – swamp guitar
- Brian West – pitched-up guitar, scratching, production, programming, recording, engineering
- Brad Haehnel – mixing, recording, engineering
- John Knupp – second engineering
- Scott Hull – mastering

== Charts ==
=== Weekly charts ===
Chart (2001–2002)	Peak position
Australia (ARIA)	7
Austria (Ö3 Austria Top 40)	22
Belgium (Ultratop 50 Flanders)	13
Belgium (Ultratip Bubbling Under Wallonia)	8
Canada CHR (Nielsen BDS)	6
Europe (Eurochart Hot 100)	10
France (SNEP)	46
Germany (GfK)	31
Hungary (Mahasz)	3
Ireland (IRMA)	5
Italy (FIMI)	50
Netherlands (Dutch Top 40)	7
Netherlands (Single Top 100)	10
New Zealand (Recorded Music NZ)	1
Norway (VG-lista)	5
Poland (Nielsen Music Control)	6
Portugal (AFP)	1
Romania (Romanian Top 100)	1
Scotland Singles (OCC)	3
Sweden (Sverigetopplistan)	9
Switzerland (Schweizer Hitparade)	2
UK Singles (OCC)	4
UK Hip Hop/R&B (OCC)	2
US Billboard Hot 100	5
US Adult Pop Airplay (Billboard)	11
US Dance Club Songs (Billboard) Remixes	1
US Hot R&B/Hip-Hop Songs (Billboard) Featuring Ms. Jade and Timbaland	52
US Pop Airplay (Billboard)	3
US Rhythmic Airplay (Billboard) Featuring Ms. Jade and Timbaland	4

=== Year-end charts ===
Chart (2001)	Position
Australia (ARIA)	38
Canada Radio (Nielsen BDS)	26
Europe (Eurochart Hot 100)	61
Ireland (IRMA)	48
Netherlands (Dutch Top 40)	31
Netherlands (Single Top 100)	76
New Zealand (RIANZ)	2
Romania (Romanian Top 100)	19
Sweden (Hitlistan)	69
Switzerland (Schweizer Hitparade)	15
UK Singles (OCC)	81
US Billboard Hot 100	70
US Adult Top 40 (Billboard)	38
US Mainstream Top 40 (Billboard)	36
US Rhythmic Top 40 (Billboard)	74

Chart (2002)	Position
US Billboard Hot 100	92
US Adult Top 40 (Billboard)	59
US Mainstream Top 40 (Billboard)	55
US Rhythmic Top 40 (Billboard)	33

== Certifications ==
Region	Certification	Certified units/sales
Australia (ARIA)	Platinum	70,000^{^}
New Zealand (RMNZ)	Gold	15,000^{‡}
Norway (IFPI Norway)	Gold	
Switzerland (IFPI Switzerland)	Gold	20,000^{^}
United Kingdom (BPI)	Silver	200,000^{‡}
^{*} Sales figures based on certification alone.^{^} Shipments figures based on certification alone.^{‡} Sales+streaming figures based on certification alone.

== Release history ==
Region	Date	Format(s)	Label(s)	Ref.
Australia	2 July 2001	CD	DreamWorks	
United States	17 July 2001	Contemporary hit radio	DreamWorks	
United Kingdom	20 August 2001	12-inch vinyl; CD; cassette	DreamWorks	
Germany	27 August 2001	CD	Universal	

== See also ==
- List of number-one dance singles of 2001 (U.S.)
- List of Romanian Top 100 number ones of the 2000s
