= Nelly Furtado discography =

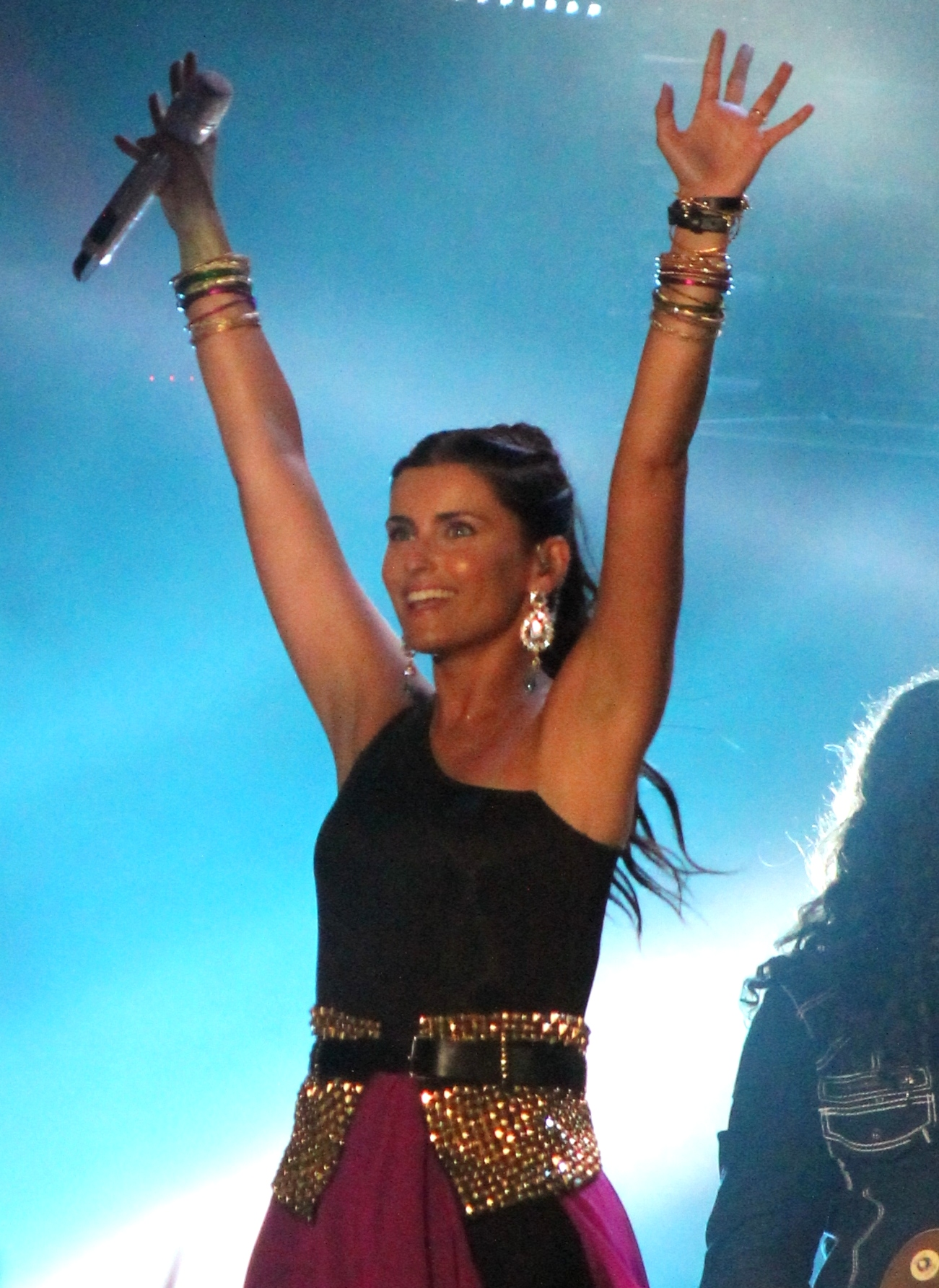
- Furtado performing in 2012
- Studio albums: 7
- Extended plays: 5
- Live albums: 1
- Compilation albums: 2
- Singles: 43
- Video albums: 2
- Music videos: 38

Canadian singer Nelly Furtado has released seven studio albums, 43 singles, two video albums, one live album, two compilation albums, five extended plays, and 38 music videos. She released her debut album Whoa, Nelly! in 2000 and it became a commercial success selling 6 million copies worldwide. It has been certified multi Platinum in countries such as Canada, United States, Australia and New Zealand. The album spawned four singles including the successful top 10 hits "I'm Like a Bird" and "Turn Off the Light". In 2003 she released her second album Folklore, while the album did not match the success of her previous album in such markets as the US and Australia, it did however become a success in several European countries. Folklore has sold 2 million copies worldwide. The album produced two European top 10 hits: "Powerless (Say What You Want)" and "Força", while "Try" peaked inside the top 10 in Canada.

Her third album Loose (2006) was the best selling album of her career, with 10 million copies sold worldwide. It reached number one on the album charts of nine countries and was certified multi-platinum in several countries such as Canada, UK, Australia, Germany, Switzerland, Austria and New Zealand. The album spawned four successful number one singles: "Promiscuous", "Maneater", "Say It Right" and "All Good Things (Come to an End)". Loose was one of the best selling albums of 2006–2007 and is twenty-second best-selling album of the 2000s. She released her first Spanish language album Mi Plan in 2009 which became a success in Europe and on the Latin charts. The lead single "Manos al Aire" became a European top 10 hit and also topped the Billboard Hot Latin Songs chart, making Furtado the first North American singer to reach number one on that chart with an original Spanish song. Mi Plan has been certified Platinum (Latin) in the US. In 2010 she released a remix album Mi Plan Remixes and her first greatest hits The Best of Nelly Furtado. Furtado released her fifth album The Spirit Indestructible in 2012, followed by The Ride in 2017. Her seventh studio album followed in 2024.

As of 2023, Furtado has sold over 45 million records, including 35 million albums, worldwide.

== Albums ==
=== Studio albums ===
Title	Details	Peak chart positions										Sales	Certifications
Title	Details	CAN	AUS	AUT	GER	ITA	NLD	NZ	SWI	UK	US	Sales	Certifications
Whoa, Nelly!	Released: October 24, 2000; Label: DreamWorks; Formats: CD, cassette, digital download	2	4	37	14	14	10	5	6	2	24	UK: 667,000; US: 2,470,000	MC: 4× Platinum; ARIA: 2× Platinum; BPI: 2× Platinum; BVMI: Gold; IFPI SWI: Platinum; NVPI: Gold; RIAA: 2× Platinum; RMNZ: 3× Platinum
Folklore	Released: November 5, 2003; Label: DreamWorks; Formats: CD, digital download	18	82	10	4	35	4	—	13	11	38	UK: 245,000; US: 425,000	MC: Platinum; BPI: Gold; BVMI: 2× Platinum; IFPI SWI: Platinum; NVPI: Gold; RIAA: Gold; RMNZ: Gold
Loose	Released: June 7, 2006; Label: Mosley, Geffen; Formats: CD, LP, digital download	1	4	1	1	3	2	1	1	4	1	GER: 1,200,000; UK: 1,100,000; US: 2,115,000	MC: 6× Platinum; ARIA: 2× Platinum; BPI: 4× Platinum; BVMI: 6× Platinum; FIMI: Gold; IFPI AUT: 2× Platinum; IFPI SWI: 5× Platinum; NVPI: Platinum; RIAA: 3× Platinum; RMNZ: 4× Platinum
Mi Plan	Released: September 11, 2009; Label: Nelstar, Universal Latino; Formats: CD, digital download	20	—	6	5	10	30	—	3	—	39		BVMI: Gold; IFPI SWI: Gold; RIAA: Platinum (Latin)
The Spirit Indestructible	Released: September 14, 2012; Label: Mosley, Interscope; Formats: CD, digital download	18	—	8	3	36	41	—	3	46	79		
The Ride	Released: March 31, 2017; Label: Nelstar; Formats: CD, LP, digital download, streaming	76	—	—	65	66	—	—	41	— (Note: "The Ride" did not enter the UK Album Chart, but debuted and peaked at number 54 on the UK Album Downloads Chart.)	—		
7	Released: September 20, 2024; Label: Nelstar, 21; Formats: CD, LP, digital download, streaming	—	—	27	35	—	—	—	27	— (Note: "7" did not enter the UK Album Chart, but debuted and peaked at number 37 on the UK Album Downloads Chart. Additionally, the album peaked at number 71 on the UK Physical Albums Chart and at number 60 on the UK Albums Sales Chart.)	—		
"—" denotes items which were not released in that country or failed to chart.

=== Compilation albums ===
List of albums, with selected chart positions, sales figures
Title	Details	Peak chart positions								Certifications
Title	Details	AUT	GER	IRE	ITA	NLD	SWI	UK	US Latin Pop	Certifications
Mi Plan Remixes	Released: October 26, 2010; Label: Nelstar, Universal Latino; Formats: CD, digital download	—	—	—	—	—	—	—	16	
The Best of Nelly Furtado	Released: November 12, 2010; Label: Geffen; Formats: CD, digital download	34	20	31	37	90	29	53	—	BPI: Platinum; BVMI: Gold
"—" denotes items which were not released in that country or failed to chart.

=== Live albums ===
List of albums, with selected details
Title	Details
Loose: The Concert	Released: November 19, 2007; Label: Geffen; Formats: CD, digital download

=== Video albums ===
List of albums, with selected details
Title	Details
Loose: The Concert	Released: November 19, 2007; Label: Geffen; Format: DVD

== Extended plays ==
List of EPs, with selected details
Title	Details
Sessions@AOL	Released: April 6, 2004; Label: DreamWorks; Format: Digital download
Live Session	Released: September 26, 2006; Label: Geffen; Format: Digital download
Live @ The Orange Lounge	Released: 2006; Label: Geffen; Format: Digital download
Edición Limitada en Español	Released: June 3, 2008; Label: Geffen; Format: Digital download
City Sessions (Amazon Music Live)	Released: November 29, 2024; Label: Nelstar, 21; Format: Streaming

== Singles ==
=== As lead artist ===
List of singles as main artist, with selected chart positions, sales figures and certifications
Title	Year	Peak chart positions										Certifications	Album
Title	Year	CAN	AUS	AUT	GER	ITA	NLD	NZ	SWI	UK	US	Certifications	Album
"I'm Like a Bird"	2000	19	2	41	41	16	8	2	17	5	9	MC: 2× Platinum; ARIA: 2× Platinum; BPI: Platinum; RIAA: Platinum; RMNZ: 2× Platinum	Whoa, Nelly!
"Turn Off the Light"	2001	— (Note: "Turn Off the Light" did not enter the Canadian Singles Chart but did peak at number six on the Nielsen BDS CHR chart.)	7	22	31	50	10	1	2	4	5	ARIA: Platinum; BPI: Silver; IFPI SWI: Gold; RMNZ: Gold	Whoa, Nelly!
"Shit on the Radio (Remember the Days)"	2001	— (Note: "Shit on the Radio (Remember the Days)" did not enter the Canadian Singles Chart but did peak at number seven on the Nielsen BDS CHR chart.)	53	48	67	28	23	5	43	18	—		Whoa, Nelly!
"Hey, Man!"	2002	— (Note: "Hey, Man!" did not enter the Canadian Singles Chart but did peak at number twelve on the Nielsen BDS CHR chart.)	—	—	—	—	87	—	—	—	—		Whoa, Nelly!
"Powerless (Say What You Want)"	2003	— (Note: "Powerless (Say What You Want)" did not enter the Canadian Singles Chart but did peak at number twelve on the Nielsen BDS CHR chart.)	37	7	8	26	6	16	16	13	— (Note: "Powerless (Say What You Want)" did not enter the Billboard Hot 100, but peaked at number nine on the Bubbling Under Hot 100 chart.)	BVMI: Gold	Folklore
"Try"	2004	— (Note: "Try" did not enter the Canadian Singles Chart but did peak at number twelve on the Nielsen BDS CHR chart.)	61	26	31	19	21	—	22	15	—	MC: Gold	Folklore
"Força"	2004	— (Note: "Força" did not enter the Canadian Singles Chart but did peak at number 27 on the Radio & Records CHR/Pop Top 30.)	—	5	9	34	4	—	5	40	—		Folklore
"Explode"	2004	—	—	54	34	—	36	—	38	—	—		Folklore
"The Grass Is Green"	2005	—	—	—	65	—	—	—	—	—	—		Folklore
"No Hay Igual" (featuring Calle 13)	2006	—	—	—	—	—	—	—	—	—	—		Loose
"Promiscuous" (featuring Timbaland)	2006	1	2	12	6	8	13	1	6	3	1	MC: 5× Platinum; ARIA: 6× Platinum; BPI: 4× Platinum; BVMI: 3× Gold; FIMI: Gold; RIAA: 7× Platinum; RMNZ: 7× Platinum	Loose
"Maneater"	2006	60	3	3	4	10	11	2	3	1	16	MC: 2× Platinum; ARIA: Gold; BPI: 3× Platinum; BVMI: 3× Gold; FIMI: Gold; IFPI SWI: Gold; RIAA: 2× Platinum; RMNZ: 4× Platinum	Loose
"Say It Right"	2006	5	2	2	2	3	2	1	1	10	1	MC: 2× Platinum; ARIA: Platinum; BPI: 2× Platinum; BVMI: 3× Gold; FIMI: Gold; IFPI SWI: Gold; RIAA: 4× Platinum; RMNZ: 4× Platinum	Loose
"All Good Things (Come to an End)"	2006	5	12	1	1	1	1	12	1	4	86	MC: 2× Platinum; ARIA: Platinum; BPI: Silver; BVMI: 2× Platinum; IFPI SWI: Platinum; RIAA: Gold; RMNZ: Gold	Loose
"Te Busqué" (featuring Juanes)	2007	—	—	25	16	—	11	—	79	—	—		Loose
"Do It"	2007	11	53	45	22	4	31	17	30	75	88		Loose
"In God's Hands"	2007	11	66	53	33	20	33	—	—	116	— (Note: "In God's Hands" did not enter the US Hot 100, but peaked at number 15 on the US Adult Contemporary chart.)		Loose
"Manos al Aire"	2009	—	—	5	2	2	92	—	6	—	— (Note: "Manos al Aire" did not enter the Billboard Hot 100, but peaked at number four on the Bubbling Under Hot 100 chart.)	IFPI SWI: Gold	Mi Plan
"Más"	2009	—	—	—	—	—	—	—	—	—	—		Mi Plan
"Bajo Otra Luz" (featuring Mala Rodríguez)	2010	—	—	—	—	—	—	—	—	—	—		Mi Plan
"Night Is Young"	2010	20	—	69	—	—	—	—	—	—	—		The Best of Nelly Furtado
"Big Hoops (Bigger the Better)"	2012	28	—	—	41	99	46	—	—	14	— (Note: "Big Hoops (Bigger the Better)" did not enter the US Hot 100, but peaked at number 6 on the US Dance Club Songs chart.)	MC: Gold	The Spirit Indestructible
"Spirit Indestructible"	2012	—	—	41	23	76	—	—	32	—	—		The Spirit Indestructible
"Parking Lot"	2012	—	—	—	—	—	—	—	—	—	— (Note: "Parking Lot" did not enter the US Hot 100 but peaked at number 12 on the US Dance Club Songs chart.)		The Spirit Indestructible
"Waiting for the Night"	2012	97	—	73	26	—	—	—	29	—	—		The Spirit Indestructible
"Pipe Dreams"	2016	—	—	—	—	—	—	—	—	—	—		The Ride
"Cold Hard Truth"	2017	—	—	—	—	—	—	—	—	—	—		The Ride
"Flatline"	2017	—	—	—	—	—	—	—	—	—	—		The Ride
"Phoenix"	2017	—	—	—	—	—	—	—	—	—	—		The Ride
"Sticks and Stones" (with Metro)	2018	—	—	—	—	—	—	—	—	—	— (Note: "Sticks & Stones" did not enter the US Hot 100, but peaked at number one on the US Dance Club Songs chart, and at number 30 on the US Hot Dance/Electronic Songs chart.)		The Ride
"Eat Your Man" (with Dom Dolla)	2023	—	84	—	—	—	—	— (Note: "Eat Your Man" did not enter the NZ Top 40 Singles Chart, but peaked at number thirteen on the NZ Hot Singles Chart.)	—	— (Note: "Eat Your Man" did not enter the UK Singles Chart but peaked at number 81 on the UK Singles Downloads Chart.)	— (Note: "Eat Your Man" did not enter the US Hot 100, but peaked at number 15 on the US Hot Dance/Electronic Songs chart.)	MC: Gold; ARIA: Platinum; RMNZ: Gold	Non-album singles
"Keep Going Up" (with Timbaland and Justin Timberlake)	2023	63	—	—	— (Note: "Keep Going Up" did not enter the German Singles Chart but debuted and peaked at number 2 on the German Trending Chart.)	—	—	— (Note: "Keep Going Up" did not enter the main New Zealand Singles Chart, but debuted and peaked at number 2 on the New Zealand Hot Singles Chart.)	—	— (Note: "Keep Going Up" did not enter the UK Singles Chart, but peaked at number 26 on the UK Singles Downloads Chart.)	84		Non-album singles
"Gala y Dalí" (with Juanes)	2024	—	—	—	—	—	—	—	—	—	—		Non-album singles
"Love Bites" (with Tove Lo and SG Lewis)	2024	— (Note: "Love Bites" did not enter the Canadian Hot 100, but peaked at number 36 on the Canada CHR/Top 40 chart.)	—	—	— (Note: "Love Bites" did not enter the German Singles Chart, but peaked at number 66 on the German Singles Downloads Chart.)	—	—	—	—	— (Note: "Love Bites" did not enter the UK Singles Chart Top 100, but peaked at number 9 on the UK Physical Singles Chart and at number 6 on the UK Vinyl Singles Chart.)	— (Note: "Love Bites" did not enter the Billboard Hot 100, but peaked at number 2 on the Dance/Mix Show Airplay chart, and at number 21 on the Dance/Electronic Songs chart.)		7
"Corazón" (with Bomba Estéreo)	2024	— (Note: "Corazón" did not enter the Canadian Hot 100, but peaked at number 14 on the Canada CHR/Top 40 chart.)	—	—	—	—	—	—	—	—	—		7
"Honesty"	2024	—	—	—	—	—	—	—	—	—	—		7
"God" (with Sid Sriram)	2025	—	—	—	—	—	—	—	—	—	—		Non-album singles
"Marriage"	2025	—	—	—	—	—	—	—	—	—	—		Non-album singles
"Doing Nothin'" (with Don Diablo)	2025	—	—	—	—	—	—	—	—	—	—		Non-album singles
"Faded" (with Hayla)	2025	—	—	—	—	—	—	—	—	—	—		Non-album singles
"Electric Circus" (featuring Boy-1da and Canada Soccer)	2026	— (Note: "Electric Circus" did not enter the Canadian Hot 100, but debuted at number 35 on the Canada CHR/Top 40 chart.)	—	—	—	—	—	—	—	—	—		What If It All Goes Right?
"Torture of the Heart" (with Dvbbs)	2026	—	—	—	—	—	—	—	—	—	—		Non-album singles
"All Good Things (Come to an End)" (with Ian Asher)	2026	—	—	—	—	—	—	— (Note: "All Good Things (Come to an End)" did not enter the NZ Top 40 Singles Chart, but peaked at number 19 on the NZ Hot Singles Chart.)	—	—	—		Non-album singles
"—" denotes items which were not released in that country or failed to chart.

=== As featured artist ===
List of singles as featured artist, with selected chart positions, sales figures and certifications
Title	Year	Peak chart positions										Certifications	Album
Title	Year	CAN	AUS	AUT	GER	ITA	NLD	NZ	SWI	UK	US	Certifications	Album
"What's Going On" (among Artists Against AIDS Worldwide)	2001	—	—	—	—	—	—	—	—	6	27		Non-album single
"Ching Ching" (Ms. Jade featuring Timbaland and Nelly Furtado)	2002	—	—	—	—	—	—	—	—	—	— (Note: "Ching Ching" did not enter the Billboard Hot 100, but peaked at number fourteen on the Bubbling Under Hot 100 chart.)		Girl Interrupted
"Fotografía" (Juanes featuring Nelly Futado)	2003	—	—	—	—	—	—	—	—	—	— (Note: "Fotografía" did not enter the Billboard Hot 100, but peaked at number sixteen on the Bubbling Under Hot 100 chart.)	RIAA: 6× Platinum (Latin)	Un Día Normal
"Friendamine" (Jelleestone featuring Nelly Furtado)	2005	—	—	—	—	—	—	—	—	—	—		The Hood Is Here
"Give It to Me" (Timbaland featuring Nelly Furtado and Justin Timberlake)	2007	1	16	3	3	8	8	2	6	1	1	MC: Platinum; BPI: Platinum; BVMI: 3× Gold; IFPI SWI: Platinum; RIAA: 3× Platinum; RMNZ: 2× Platinum	Shock Value
"Win or Lose" (Zero Assoluto featuring Nelly Furtado)	2008	—	—	—	64	—	—	—	—	—	—		Non-album single
"Broken Strings" (James Morrison featuring Nelly Furtado)	2008	41	80	2	1	4	7	10	1	2	—	BPI: 3× Platinum; BVMI: Platinum; FIMI: Gold; IFPI SWI: Gold; RMNZ: 2× Platinum	Songs for You, Truths for Me
"Jump" (Flo Rida featuring Nelly Furtado)	2009	32	18	34	27	—	—	33	—	21	54	RIAA: Gold	R.O.O.T.S.
"Morning After Dark" (Timbaland featuring Nelly Furtado and SoShy)	2009	8	19	12	6	37	17	—	20	6	61	BPI: Silver; BVMI: Gold	Shock Value II
"Sunglasses" (Divine Brown featuring Nelly Furtado)	2009	22	—	—	—	—	—	—	—	—	—		The Love Chronicles
"Who Wants to Be Alone" (Tiësto featuring Nelly Furtado)	2010	—	—	—	—	—	34	—	—	91	—		Kaleidoscope
"Wavin' Flag" (among Young Artists for Haiti)	2010	1	—	—	—	—	—	—	—	104	—	MC: 3× Platinum	Non-album single
"Hot-n-Fun" (N.E.R.D. featuring Nelly Furtado)	2010	98	52	—	—	26	88	—	—	49	—		Nothing
"Is Anybody Out There?" (K'naan featuring Nelly Furtado)	2012	14	—	7	11	—	25	1	20	—	92	MC: Platinum; RMNZ: Gold	Country, God or the Girl
"Sin Ti" (Tommy Torres featuring Nelly Furtado)	2012	—	—	—	—	—	—	—	—	—	—		12 historias
"Be OK" (Dylan Murray featuring Nelly Furtado)	2013	—	—	—	—	—	—	—	—	—	—		Inspiration
"Shapeshifter" (Alessia Cara featuring Nelly Furtado)	2026	—	—	—	—	—	—	—	—	—	—		Love or Lack Thereof
"—" denotes items which were not released in that country or failed to chart.

=== Promotional singles ===
List of promotional singles, with selected chart positions
Title	Year	Peak chart positions		Album
Title	Year	US Dance	US Latin Dig.	Album
"Silencio" (featuring Josh Groban)	2009	—	—	Mi Plan
"Fuerte" (featuring Concha Buika)	2009	3	46	Mi Plan
"Too Good"	2016	—	—	Non-album single
"Behind Your Back"	2016	—	—	The Ride
"Islands of Me"	2016	—	—	The Ride
"Blue (Yes I Love You)" (with YellowStraps and Sofiane Pamart)	2025	—	—	Non-album single
"Showstopper" (Remix) (featuring AJ Tracey)	2025	—	—	7
"Only Human" (with KH and Four Tet)	2025	—	—	Non-album single
"Maneater" (Ritual Version)	2026	—	—	Loose: 20th Anniversary Edition
"—" denotes items which were not released in that country or failed to chart.

== Other appearances ==
List of non-single appearances, with other performing artists, showing year released and album name
Title	Year	Other artist(s)	Album
"Waitin' 4 the Streets"	1996	Plains of Fascination	Join the Ranks
"Get Ur Freak On" (Remix)	2001	Missy Elliott	Lara Croft: Tomb Raider
"Instant Karma!"	2001	David A. Stewart	Come Together: A Night for John Lennon's Words and Music
"The Harder They Come"	2002	Paul Oakenfold	Bunkka
"Fine Line"	2002	Jarvis Church	Shake It Off
"Thin Line"	2002	Jurassic 5	Power in Numbers
"Sacrifice"	2002	The Roots	Phrenology
"Breath"	2002	Swollen Members	Monsters in the Closet
"Très Fly"	2002	Tallisman	80 Million Isms
"Quando, Quando, Quando"	2005	Michael Bublé	It's Time
"Slippery Sidewalks", "Baldosas Mojadas"	2007	Bajofondo	Mar Dulce
"Daydream Believer"	2007	Anne Murray	Anne Murray Duets: Friends & Legends
"Sexy Movimiento" (Remix)	2008	Wisin & Yandel	Los Extraterrestres: Otra Dimensión
"I Wish I Knew Natalie Portman"	2009	k-os and Saukrates	Yes!
"Bang the Drum"	2010	Bryan Adams	Sounds of Vancouver 2010: Opening Ceremony
"Where It Begins"	2010	Ivete Sangalo	Live at Madison Square Garden
"Time Stand Still"	2010	—N/a	Score: A Hockey Musical
"Crocodile Rock"	2011	Elton John	Gnomeo & Juliet
"Mama Knows"	2011	Game	The R.E.D. Album
"The Seeker"	2011	—N/a	The Year Dolly Parton Was My Mom
"El Camino de los Sueños"	2011	Antonio Carmona	De Noche
"On the Run"	2012	Saukrates and k-os	Season One
"Corcovado"	2013	Andrea Bocelli	Passione
"Headphones"	2013	Nelly	M.O.
"Bésame Mucho"	2013	Lucho Gatica	Historia de Un Amor
"Getaway"	2013	Stack$	The Snowball Effect
"Scars", "Party"	2014	Emmanuel Jal	The Key
"Hadron Collider	2016	Blood Orange	Freetown Sound
"Exposed"	2017	Tangina Stone	Elevate
"Never Lost"	2024	Ryan Lott	The Greatest Hits: Original Soundtrack
"Shapeshifter"	2026	Alessia Cara	Love or Lack Thereof
"Like an Angel"	2026	Sofiane Pamart	Movie
"No Place Like Home"	2026	Major Lazer, Davido	Official FIFA World Cup 2026 Album
"Hoy Por Tí"	2026	Lido Pimienta	Caribenya

== Music videos ==
Year	Title	Album	Director(s)
2000	"I'm Like a Bird"	Whoa, Nelly!	Francis Lawrence
2001	"Turn Off the Light"	Whoa, Nelly!	Sophie Muller
2001	"... On the Radio (Remember the Days)"	Whoa, Nelly!	Hype Williams
2002	"Hey, Man!"	Whoa, Nelly!	Various
2003	"Powerless (Say What You Want)"	Folklore	Bryan Barber
2004	"Try"	Folklore	Sophie Muller
2004	"Força"	Folklore	Ulf Buddensiek
2004	"Explode"	Folklore	Bradley Cayford, Nelly Furtado
2006	"Promiscuous" (featuring Timbaland)	Loose	Little X
2006	"Maneater"	Loose	Anthony Mandler
2006	"No Hay Igual" (Original version and Remix featuring Residente Calle 13)	Loose	Israel Lugo, Gabriel Coss
2006	"Say It Right"	Loose	Rankin & Chris
2007	"All Good Things (Come to an End)"	Loose	Israel Lugo, Gabriel Coss
2007	"In God's Hands"	Loose	Jesse Dylan
2007	"En las Manos de Dios"	Loose	Jesse Dylan
2007	"Do It"	Loose	Aaron A., Nelly Furtado
2009	"Manos al Aire" (Original and English subtitled version)	Mi Plan	Little X
2009	"Más" (Original and English subtitled version)	Mi Plan	Little X
2010	"Bajo Otra Luz" (Radio Edit, featuring La Mala Rodríguez)	Mi Plan	Aaron A., Su Montes, Nelly Furtado
2010	"Fuerte" (Original English version, featuring Concha Buika)	Mi Plan Remixes	Aaron A., Richard Bernardin, Robacho Buika
2010	"Night Is Young"	The Best of Nelly Furtado	Alan Ferguson
2011	"Crocodile Rock" (featuring Elton John)	Gnomeo & Juliet: Original Soundtrack	
2012	"Big Hoops (Bigger the Better)"	The Spirit Indestructible	Little X
2012	"Big Hoops (Bigger the Better)" (Home Made Version)	The Spirit Indestructible	Aaron A.
2012	"Spirit Indestructible"	The Spirit Indestructible	Aaron A.
2012	"Parking Lot" (Original and Fagault & Marina Remix version)	The Spirit Indestructible	Ray Kay
2013	"Waiting for the Night"	The Spirit Indestructible	The Seed Collective
2013	"Bucket List"	The Spirit Indestructible	Aaron A., Joachim Johnson
2016	"Pipe Dreams"	The Ride	Jake Elliott
2024	"Gala y Dalí"	Non-album single	Aaron A.
2024	"Love Bites" (featuring Tove Lo & SG Lewis)	7	Gemma Warren
2024	"Corazón" (featuring Bomba Estéreo)	7	Anthony Nusca, Bertrand Exertier
2024	"Honesty"	7	Valentin Herfray
2024	"Untitled"	7	
2024	"Floodgate"	7	CarameloCreative
2024	"Better For Worse" (featuring Gray Hawken)	7	Valentin Herfray
2024	"Showstopper"	7	Doucce
2024	"Better Than Ever"	7	Valentin Herfray
2026	"Electric Circus" (featuring Boi-1da and Canada Soccer)	What If It All Goes Right	Stacey Lee Ottman, ZALE

Featured music videos

Year	Title	Album	Director
2001	"What's Going On" (among Artists Against AIDS Worldwide)	What's Going On	Jake Scott
2002	"Breath" (Swollen Members featuring Nelly Furtado)	Monsters in the Closet	Todd MacFarlane
2002	"Ching Ching" (Ms. Jade featuring Timbaland and Nelly Furtado)	Girl Interrupted	Mark Classon
2003	"Fotografía" (Juanes featuring Nelly Furtado)	Un Día Normal	Picky Talarico
2005	"Friendamine (Remix)" (Jelleestone featuring Nelly Furtado)	The Hood Is Here	
2007	"Give It to Me" (Timbaland featuring Nelly Furtado and Justin Timberlake)	Shock Value	Paul "Coy" Allen
2008	"Win or Lose (Appena Prima di Partire)" (Zero Assoluto featuring Nelly Furtado)	Non-album single	Cosimo Alema
2008	"Broken Strings" (James Morrison featuring Nelly Furtado)	Songs for You, Truths for Me	Micah Meisner
2009	"Jump" (Flo Rida featuring Nelly Furtado)	R.O.O.T.S.	Chris Robinson
2009	"I Wish I Knew Natalie Portman" (k-os featuring Saukrates and Nelly Furtado)	Yes!	Little X
2009	"Morning After Dark" (Timbaland featuring Nelly Furtado and SoShy)	Shock Value II	Paul "Coy" Allen
2010	"Who Wants to Be Alone" (Tiësto featuring Nelly Furtado)	Kaleidoscope	Alan Ferguson
2010	"Wavin' Flag (Haiti Mix)" (K'naan featuring Nelly Furtado)	Charity single	
2010	"Hot-n-Fun" (N.E.R.D. featuring Nelly Furtado)	Nothing	Jonas Åkerlund
2010	"Where It Begins" (Ivete Sangalo featuring Nelly Furtado)	Multishow Ao Vivo: Ivete Sangalo No Madison Square Garden	Nick Wickham
2011	"El Camino De Los Sueños" (Antonio Carmona featuring Nelly Furtado)	De Noche	Director
2012	"Is Anybody Out There?" (K'naan featuring Nelly Furtado)	More Beautiful Than Silence	Chris Robinson
2013	"Sin Ti" (Tommy Torres featuring Nelly Furtado)	12 Historias	Jorge Colón
2015	"Scars" (Emmanuel Jal featuring Nelly Furtado)	The Key	Daniel Palmer
2025	Faded (Hayla featuring Nelly Furtado)	Non-album single	Jack Collier, Reinhardt Kenneth

Cameo appearances

Year	Title	Artist	Album
2004	"Crabbuckit"	k-os	Joyful Rebellion
2006	"Rockstar"	Nickelback	All the Right Reasons
2008	"Making A Scene"	Fritz Helder & The Phantoms	Greatest Hits: Platinum Edition
