= Mi Plan Tour =

2010 concert tour by Nelly Furtado

- Tour by Nelly Furtado
- Promotional poster for tour
- Associated album: Mi Plan
- Start date: March 13, 2010
- End date: November 26, 2010
- Legs: 5
- No. of shows: 7 in North America; 7 in South America; 1 in Europe; 1 in Asia; 16 total

Nelly Furtado concert chronology
- Get Loose Tour (2007–08); Mi Plan Tour (2010); The Spirit Indestructible Tour (2013)

The Mi Plan Tour was the fourth concert tour by Canadian singer-songwriter Nelly Furtado. The tour supported her fourth studio album, Mi Plan (2009). Since the album was recorded in Spanish, the tour primarily focused on hispanophone countries in the Americas. Dates in Europe and Asia were scheduled as well.

== Background ==
The tour was announced on January 5, 2010, via Furtado's official website. For the tour, Furtado asked her fans for help choosing the setlist, asking which songs should be on the show.

The concert in Santiago was one of the first after the 2010 Chile earthquake that happened 3 weeks before. Nelly Furtado donated 5% of the revenues to the people affected by the catastrophe. To promote the tour in Brazil on March 24, 2010, Furtado made a "VIP Pocket Show" appearance in the reality show program Big Brother Brasil 10 from Rede Globo, the country's leading channel. She performed 5 songs from the tour in acoustic versions ("Maneater", "I'm Like a Bird", "Try", "Say It Right" and "Turn Off The Light").

== Set list ==
This setlist is from the March 28, 2010, show at HSBC Arena, Rio de Janeiro, Brazil. It does not represent every show of the tour.

1. "Maneater"
2. "Força"
3. "Bajo Otra Luz"
4. "Shit on the Radio (Remember the Days)"
5. "I'm like a Bird"
6. "My Love Grows Deeper (Part 1)" / "I Will Make U Cry" / "Legend" / "Baby Girl" / "Party's Just Begun (Again)"
7. "Más"
8. "Try"
9. "Fotografía" / "Te Busqué" / "Sexy Movimiento" / "No Hay Igual"
10. "Fuerte"
11. "Turn Off the Light"
12. "All Good Things (Come to an End)"
13. "Powerless (Say What You Want)" (contains excerpts from "Land of Confusion")
14. "Manos al Aire"
15. "Do It"
16. "Give It to Me" / "Morning After Dark" / "Jump"

Encore

17. "Who Wants to Be Alone"
18. "Say It Right"

Notes

- During her concert at the Ravinia Pavilion in Highland Park, Illinois, Furtado performed "Time Stand Still" by Rush instead of performing "Girlfriend in the City".

== Tour dates ==
Date	City	Country	Venue
Latin America
March 13, 2010	Guadalajara	Mexico	Auditorio Telmex
March 15, 2010	Monterrey	Mexico	Arena Monterrey
March 16, 2010	Mexico City	Mexico	Auditorio Nacional
March 18, 2010	Caracas	Venezuela	Terraza del C.C.C.T.
March 20, 2010	Salinas	Ecuador	Explanada de la Salinas Yacht Club
March 22, 2010	Santiago	Chile	Movistar Arena
March 23, 2010	Buenos Aires	Argentina	Luna Park
March 25, 2010	Porto Alegre	Brazil	Teatro do Bourbon Country
March 27, 2010	São Paulo	Brazil	Via Funchal
March 28, 2010	Rio de Janeiro	Brazil	HSBC Arena
North America
July 24, 2010^{[A]}	Los Angeles	United States	Staples Center
Europe
August 29, 2010^{[B]}	Warsaw	Poland	Tor wyścigów konnych Służewiec
North America
September 3, 2010^{[C]}	Highland Park	United States	Ravinia Pavilion
October 3, 2010^{[D]}	Los Angeles	United States	Gibson Amphitheatre
October 22, 2010^{[E]}	San Juan	United States	José Miguel Agrelot Coliseum
Asia
November 26, 2010^{[F]}	Abu Dhabi	United Arab Emirates	Yas Arena

Festivals and other miscellaneous performances

^{A} This concert was a part of Reventon Super Estrella 2010
^{B} This concert was a part of Orange Warsaw Festival
^{C} This concert was a part of Ravinia Festival
^{D} This concert was a part of Terra Music Fest
^{E} This concert was a part of Noche de estrellas de Fidelity
^{F} This concert was a part of Yas Show Weekends
