= The Best of Nelly Furtado =

Greatest hits album by Nelly Furtado
- Released: November 12, 2010
- Recorded: 1999–2010
- Studios: The Gymnasium; Iguana Recording; Rumblecone Studios; The Orange Lounge (Toronto, Canada); The Gymnasium; 4th Street Recording; The Chill Building (Santa Monica, California); Track Record; Capitol Studios (Hollywood, California); Can-Am Studios (Tarzana, California); Larrabee East; La Casa Studios (Los Angeles, California); The Hit Factory; Instrument Zoo (Miami, Florida); Metrophonic Studios; State of the Ark Studios (London, England)
- Length: 70:33
- Languages: English; Portuguese; Spanish
- Label: Geffen
- Producers: James Bryan; Julio Reyes Copello; Danja; Gerald Eaton; Hans Ebert; David Foster; Nelly Furtado; Humberto Gatica; Kamal Gray; Juanes; StayBent Krunk-a-Delic; Lil' Jaz; Lester Mendez; Rick Nowels; Andy Rogers; Salaamremi.com; Gustavo Santaolalla; Mark Taylor; Tiesto; Timbaland; Brian West

Nelly Furtado chronology
Mi Plan Remixes (2010)	The Best of Nelly Furtado (2010)	The Spirit Indestructible (2012)

Singles from The Best of Nelly Furtado
- 1. "Night Is Young" Released: October 12, 2010

The Best of Nelly Furtado is a greatest hits album by Canadian singer-songwriter Nelly Furtado. The album was first released on November 12, 2010. The album includes all of Furtado's biggest hits, as well as songs she is featured in and three new songs: "Night Is Young", "Stars" and "Girlfriend in the City". It was released in standard, deluxe and super deluxe editions. The album's track listing and artwork were revealed on October 14, 2010.

== Background ==
Talking about how she picked the new songs to be on the greatest hits Furtado said, "The way I picked the new songs for Best of Nelly Furtado was I was just coming off my Latin American tour for Mi Plan and two of my songs got leaked on the internet. Somebody in Eastern Europe or something leaked the songs on the internet. One song was "Night Is Young" and the other song was "Girlfriend In The City", but they were kind of horrible versions that weren't even finished and not mixed. So I thought okay, a lot of my fans have heard these new songs anyway in their rough version, I might as well finish them and put them out properly on the greatest hits album. It kind of seemed like the natural choice. And then the third selection is "Stars", which is a song Lester Mendez and I wrote a couple years ago when we were doing the Loose sessions. It's one of those songs that I think people who like Folklore will like, because it's more intimate and slow." The diss track "Give It to Me" was omitted from the album's track listing due to the negative lyrical content according to Furtado in an interview.

== Critical reception ==
Professional ratings
Review scores
Source	Rating
AllMusic	4/5 stars
The New Zealand Herald	3/5 stars
Slant Magazine	4/5 stars

Stephen Thomas Erlewine of AllMusic gave the album a four out of five star rating, noting the variety on the album and commended that "Not one of Nelly Furtado’s albums sounds like the one that came before", calling it an "admirable trait". Slant Magazine called Furtado "one of pop music's most eclectic artists" and wrote that "the set also positions Furtado as one of the absolute finest singles artists of her generation."

Scott Kara from The New Zealand Herald saw the release as being for the fans.

== Promotion ==
On August 26, 2010, at the "Orange Warsaw Festival" in Poland, Furtado debuted two previously unreleased songs, "Night Is Young" and "Girlfriend in the City".

== Commercial performance ==
The album charted only in European territories for solely one week, while lasting two in Switzerland, debuting at 100 and peaking at 29. The album is certified gold in Germany and Poland and Platinum in the UK.

== Track listing ==
The Best of Nelly Furtado – Standard edition
No.	Title	Writer(s)	Producer(s)	Length
1.	"I'm Like a Bird" (from Whoa, Nelly!, 2000)	Nelly Furtado	Gerald Eaton; Brian West; Furtado	4:04
2.	"Turn Off the Light" (from Whoa, Nelly!)	Furtado	Eaton; West; Furtado	4:36
3.	"...on the Radio (Remember the Days)" (from Whoa, Nelly!)	Furtado	Eaton; West; Furtado	3:55
4.	"Fotografía" (duet with Juanes; from Un Día Normal, 2002)	Juanes	Juanes; Gustavo Santaolalla	4:00
5.	"Powerless (Say What You Want)" (from Folklore, 2003)	Furtado; Eaton; West; Trevor Horn; Anne Dudley; Malcolm McLaren	Track & Field; Furtado	3:54
6.	"Try" (from Folklore)	Furtado; West	Track & Field; Furtado	4:38
7.	"Força" (from Folklore)	Furtado; Eaton; West	Track & Field; Furtado	3:41
8.	"Promiscuous" (featuring Timbaland; from Loose, 2006)	Tim "Attitude" Clayton; Tim Mosley; Furtado; Nate Hills	Timbaland; Danja; Jim Beanz^{[a]}	4:02
9.	"Maneater" (from Loose)	Furtado; Mosley; Hills; Beanz	Timbaland; Danja; Beanz^{[a]}	4:18
10.	"Say It Right" (from Loose)	Furtado; Mosley; Hills	Timbaland; Danja; Beanz^{[a]}	3:43
11.	"All Good Things (Come to an End)" (from Loose)	Furtado; Mosley; Chris Martin; Hills	Timbaland; Danja; Beanz^{[a]}	5:09
12.	"In God's Hands" (from Loose)	Furtado; Rick Nowels	Nowels; Furtado	4:12
13.	"Broken Strings" (featuring James Morrison; from Songs for You, Truths for Me, 2008)	Morrison; Fraser T. Smith; Nina Woodford	Mark Taylor	4:10
14.	"Girlfriend in the City"	Salaam Remi; Furtado	Salaamremi.com	4:41
15.	"Night Is Young"	Remi; Furtado; Hernst Bellevue	Salaamremi.com; StayBent Krunk-a-Delic	3:32
16.	"Stars"	Lester Mendez; Furtado	Mendez	4:28
17.	"Manos al Aire" (from Mi Plan, 2009)	Furtado; James Bryan; Alex Cuba	Bryan; Furtado; Demo Castellon^{[b]}	3:29
Total length:				70:33

The Best of Nelly Furtado – International edition (bonus track)
No.	Title	Writer(s)	Producer(s)	Length
18.	"Crazy" (Radio 1 Live Lounge Session)	Brian Burton; Thomas Callaway; Gianfranco Reverberi; Gianpiero Reverberi	Andy Rogers	3:24
Total length:				73:57

The Best of Nelly Furtado – Spanish and Latin American edition (bonus track)
No.	Title	Writer(s)	Producer(s)	Length
18.	"Lo Bueno Siempre Tiene un Final"	Furtado; Mosley; Martin; Hills; Julio Reyes Copello	Timbaland; Danja; Copello^{[a]}	4:24
Total length:				74:57

The Best of Nelly Furtado – Deluxe edition (bonus CD)
No.	Title	Writer(s)	Producer(s)	Length
1.	"Quando, Quando, Quando" (duet with Michael Bublé)	Tony Renis; Alberto Testa; Pat Boone	David Foster; Humberto Gatica	4:44
2.	"Te Busque" (duet with Juanes)	Furtado; Juanes; Mendez	Mendez	3:39
3.	"Island of Wonder" (featuring Caetano Veloso)	Furtado; Jasper Gahunia; Simón Díaz	Lil' Jaz; Furtado; Track & Field^{[c]}	3:48
4.	"I'm Like a Bird" (Nelly vs Asha Remix)	Furtado	Hans Ebert	5:26
5.	"Who Wants to Be Alone" (Tiësto featuring Nelly Furtado)	Tijs Verwest; D.J. Waakop Reijers-Fraaij; Furtado; Nowels	Tiësto; Reijers-Fraaij^{[b]}	4:36
6.	"Sacrifice" (The Roots featuring Nelly Furtado)	Tariq Trotter; Ahmir Thompson; Kamal Gray; Leonard Hubbard	Gray	4:44
7.	"In God's Hands" (featuring Keith Urban)	Furtado; Nowels	Nowels; Furtado	4:34
Total length:				31:31

The Best of Nelly Furtado – iTunes Store deluxe edition (bonus track)
No.	Title	Writer(s)	Producer(s)	Length
8.	"Night Is Young" (Remix by FrankMusik "Montreal Mist Edit")	Remi; Furtado; Bellevue	Salaamremi.com; Krunk-a-Delic	4:29
Total length:				36:00

The Best of Nelly Furtado – Amazon Music deluxe edition (bonus track)
No.	Title	Writer(s)	Producer(s)	Length
8.	"Night Is Young" (Sketch Iz Dead Remix)	Remi; Furtado; Bellevue	Salaamremi.com; Krunk-a-Delic	3:27
Total length:				34:58

The Best of Nelly Furtado – Super deluxe edition (bonus DVD)
No.	Title	Director(s)	Length
1.	"I'm Like a Bird" (music video)	Francis Lawrence
2.	"Turn Off the Light" (music video)	Sophie Muller
3.	"Powerless (Say What You Want)" (music video)	Bryan Barber
4.	"Try" (music video)	Muller
5.	"Força" (music video)	Ulf Buddensiek
6.	"Explode" (music video)	Bradley Cayford; Furtado
7.	"Maneater" (music video)	Anthony Mandler
8.	"Promiscuous" (music video)	Little X
9.	"Say It Right" (music video)	Rankin and Chris
10.	"All Good Things (Come to an End)" (music video)	Gabriel Coss; Israel Lugo
11.	"In God's Hands" (music video)	Jesse Dylan
12.	"No Hay Igual" (music video)	Lugo; Coss
13.	"Wait for You" (music video)	Aaron A

Notes

- ^{^a} signifies a vocal producer
- ^{^b} signifies a co-producer
- ^{^c} signifies an additional producer

== Personnel ==
Credits for unreleased songs are taken from The Best of Nelly Furtado liner notes.

"Girlfriend in the City"

- Nelly Furtado - lead vocals
- Salaam Remi - bass, guitar, drums, arrangement
- Vincent Henry - horns
- Mark "Spike" Stent - mixing
- Frank Socorro - recording
- Gleyder "GEE" Disla - recording
- The Czech Film Orchestra - strings
- Stephen Coleman - strings arrangement

"Night Is Young"

- Nelly Furtado - lead vocals
- Salaam Remi - drums
- StayBent Krunk-a-Delic - drums
- Robert Orton - mixing
- Frank Socorro - recording
- Gleyder "GEE" Disla - recording

"Stars"

- Nelly Furtado - lead vocals
- Ramon Stagnaro - acoustic guitar
- Joe Wohlmuth - engineering, mixing
- Joel Numa - additional engineering
- Lester Mendez - mixing

== Charts ==
Chart performance for The Best of Nelly Furtado
Chart (2010–2012)	Peak position
Austrian Albums (Ö3 Austria)	34
Belgian Albums (Ultratop Flanders)	55
Belgian Albums (Ultratop Wallonia)	81
Czech Albums (ČNS IFPI)	40
Dutch Albums (Album Top 100)	90
German Albums (Offizielle Top 100)	20
Greek Albums (IFPI Greece)	14
Hungarian Albums (MAHASZ)	23
Irish Albums (IRMA)	31
Italian Albums (FIMI)	37
Polish Albums (ZPAV)	20
Scottish Albums (Official Charts)	66
Swiss Albums (Schweizer Hitparade)	29
UK Albums (Official Charts)	53

Chart (2026)	Peak position
UK Album Downloads (OCC)	6
UK Album Sales (OCC)	95

== Certifications ==
Certifications for The Best of Nelly Furtado
Region	Certification	Certified units/sales
Germany (BVMI)	Gold	100,000^{‡}
Poland (ZPAV)	Gold	10,000^{*}
United Kingdom (BPI)	Platinum	300,000^{‡}
^{*} Sales figures based on certification alone.^{‡} Sales+streaming figures based on certification alone.

== Release history ==
List of release dates, showing country, record label and edition
Region	Date	Label	Edition
Germany	November 12, 2010	Geffen	Standard, Deluxe
Poland	November 12, 2010	Universal Music	Standard, Deluxe
United States	November 16, 2010	Geffen	Standard, Deluxe
United Kingdom	November 29, 2010	Polydor	Standard, Deluxe
