= Cold Hard Truth =

Cold Hard Truth may refer to:

- Cold Hard Truth (album), a 1999 album by George Jones
- Cold Hard Truth (song), a 2017 song by Nelly Furtado
- Cold Hard Truth (Dead Zone), an episode of the TV series The Dead Zone
