= 7 (Nelly Furtado album) =

2024 studio album by Nelly Furtado

Studio album by Nelly Furtado
- Released: September 20, 2024
- Recorded: 2020–2024
- Studios: The Orange Lounge (Toronto); Paramount Studios (Los Angeles); Westlake Recording Studios (Hollywood, California); Phase One Studios (Scarborough, Ontario); Engine Room (New York City); Milk Boy Studios (Philadelphia); Abstrackt Sound Studios (Bryn Mawr, Pennsylvania)
- Length: 37:07
- Languages: English; Spanish; Haitian Creole
- Labels: Nelstar; 21
- Producers: Nelly Furtado; T-Minus; SG Lewis; WondaGurl; Dom Dolla; Jim Beanz; FnZ; Gray Hawken; Charlotte Day Wilson; Herag Sanbalian; Totally Enormous Extinct Dinosaurs; Teddy Walton; Aaron Bow; Thislandis; Oliver Cazier

Nelly Furtado chronology
| The Ride (2017) | 7 (2024) |

Singles from 7
- 1. "Love Bites" Released: May 22, 2024; 2. "Corazón" Released: July 12, 2024; 3. "Honesty" Released: September 20, 2024; 4. "Showstopper" Released: December 25, 2024

7 is the seventh studio album by Canadian singer-songwriter Nelly Furtado, released on September 20, 2024, through Nelstar Entertainment and 21 Entertainment Group. It is her first album since 2017's The Ride, and was preceded by the singles "Love Bites" featuring Tove Lo and SG Lewis and "Corazón" featuring Bomba Estéreo. The album additionally contains collaborations with singer Charlotte Day Wilson, DJ and producer Dom Dolla and producers WondaGurl and T-Minus.

7 was nominated at the 2026 Juno Awards for Pop Album of the Year.

== Background ==
After several years of inactivity, Furtado confirmed new music in an interview in Fault magazine in May 2023, saying that she had "recorded a hundred songs in the last 18 months" and was "so excited to bring people new music".

With the album's announcement in July 2024, Furtado said that she wrote "400–500 pieces of music in 4 years" and explained that her ADHD does not "always allow for [her] to organize creations in a methodical way so it's hard to explain how we have chosen 14 songs that magically rose to the top of the heap". Furtado likened the songs to "random seashells that may be similar but not at all alike" and said that her intention was to "provide some portals to trip out and release and escape". Her label called the album "four years of artistic discovery".

About the album title, Furtado stated it was the only title that made sense to her, as well as being her seventh studio album and seven years having passed since her previous album, because "it's more like a collection. Fashion collections don't really have titles, they're just called collection number 10 or 21. This is my collection seven."

== Promotion ==
=== Singles ===
Furtado released the lead single "Love Bites" in May 2024, a collaboration with Swedish singer Tove Lo and British DJ SG Lewis. Furtado stated in 2023 that she wanted to work with DJs as she felt "called back to music from the DJ community" and "realized how much people like to dance and escape to [her] music". The song peaked at number 36 on the Canadian Billboard CHR/Top 40 chart, number 2 on the US Billboard Dance/Mix Show Airplay chart, and at number 21 on the Dance/Electronic Songs chart.

The second single "Corazón" was released on July 12, 2024, the day following the album announcement. Furtado first performed the song at Machaca Fest in Monterrey, Mexico, in June 2023; she had mentioned a collaboration with Colombian band Bomba Estéreo in August 2023 after performing with them at the Osheaga Festival earlier that month. In Canada, "Corazón" peaked at number 17 on the CHR/Top 40 chart. The DJ Arana Remix was released on January 1, 2025.

On the day of the album's release, Furtado released an official visualizer video for "Honesty", which was sent to Italian radio as the album's third single.

On December 25, 2024, Furtado released "Showstopper" as the album's fourth single, remixed and adding a feature from British rapper AJ Tracey.

=== Live performances ===
In June 2024, Furtado performed the closing set to that year's Mighty Hoopla festival. Among her best known tracks, she performed "Love Bites". On July 16, 2024, she performed at the Isle of MTV concert in Malta. In September 2024, Furtado performed "Save Your Breath" as part of the City Sessions at Amazon Music Live. In August 2025, Furtado embarked on the "Better than Ever Summer Festival Tour" with festival concerts throughout Europe.

=== Promotional videos ===
Aside from Furtado's music videos released in support of the album's official singles, she released official visualisers for a number of tracks; on November 13, 2024, she released the visualizer for "Untitled", and a visualizer for "Floodgate", which followed on December 13, 2024. Subsequently, she released lyric videos for "Better For Worse" on December 25, 2024, "Showstopper" on January 1, 2025, and "Better Than Ever" on January 14, 2025.

== Critical reception ==
Professional ratings
Review scores
| Source | Rating |
|---|---|
| AllMusic | 3.5/5 stars |
| Exclaim! | 6/10 |
| Medium | 8/10 |
| MusicOMH | 3/5 stars |
| Riff | 7/10 |
| Sputnikmusic | 3/5 |

Josh Korngut, writing for Exclaim!, expressed disappointment with the album's overall lack of risk and depth. Korngut acknowledged Furtado's past musical successes, highlighting her ability to deliver emotionally powerful tracks like "Try" and "Pipe Dreams", but felt that 7 falls short of her potential. He suggested that the pressure to deliver a commercially successful album after several "flop eras" may have led to a safer, less adventurous project. Korngut noted that while some tracks, like "Better Than Ever", showcase Furtado's strength in confessional songwriting, many others, such as "Ready for Myself", feel outdated or uninspired. The track "Save Your Breath" was praised for its future-facing collaboration with drag star Tynomi Banks, though Korngut felt that the album's lead singles, including "Love Bites" and "Corazón", failed to captivate fans. Despite these criticisms, Korngut acknowledged Furtado's talent and ability to reinvent herself, suggesting that while 7 may not have hit the mark, she still has the potential to surprise critics in the future.

== Commercial performance ==
7 saw minor success in five European countries; in the United Kingdom, 7 debuted at number 37 on the UK Album Downloads Chart and at number 60 on the UK Album Sales Chart.

== Track listing ==
7 track listing
| No. | Title | Writer(s) | Producer(s) | Length |
|---|---|---|---|---|
| 1. | "Showstopper" | Nelly Furtado; Ebony Oshunrinde; Nevis Gahunia; Jenna Andrews; Stephen Kirk; Herag Sanbalian | WondaGurl; Sanbalian^{[a]}; Jim Beanz^{[c]} | 2:29 |
| 2. | "Corazón" (featuring Bomba Estéreo) | Furtado; Tyler Williams; Andrews; Lilliana Saumet; Gahunia; Oliver Cazier; Kirk; Steven Bilodeau | T-Minus; Furtado; Billa Joints^{[b]}; Beanz^{[c]} | 2:37 |
| 3. | "Love Bites" (featuring Tove Lo and SG Lewis) | Furtado; Samuel George Lewis; Tove Nilsson | SG Lewis | 2:47 |
| 4. | "Better for Worse" (featuring Gray Hawken) | Furtado; Beanz; Drew Veloric; Ryan Gray Hawken | Beanz | 3:24 |
| 5. | "Honesty" | Furtado; SG Lewis; Sarah Aarons; Orlando Higginbottom | SG Lewis; Totally Enormous Extinct Dinosaurs | 2:16 |
| 6. | "Floodgate" | Furtado; Mei Ehara; Isaac De Boni; Michael Mulé; Aaron Booe; Travis Walton; Ryland Kelly; Tauren Strickland | FnZ; Teddy Walton; Aaron Bow; Thislandis; Hawken^{[c]} | 2:06 |
| 7. | "Crown" (featuring Blxckie) | Furtado; Williams; Bilodeau; Lido Pimienta; Sihle Philmon Sithole | T-Minus; Billa Joints; Anthony Yordanov^{[c]} | 2:46 |
| 8. | "All Comes Back" (featuring Charlotte Day Wilson) | Furtado; Charlotte Day Wilson | Furtado; Wilson; Hawken^{[b]} | 3:14 |
| 9. | "Save Your Breath" (featuring Williane 108, Charmie, Taborah Johnson, and Tynomi Banks) | Furtado; Williams; Bilodeau; Charmie Deller; Sheldon Orlando McIntosh; Mignone Moïse | T-Minus; Billa Joints^{[a]}; Yordanov^{[c]} | 2:59 |
| 10. | "Ready for Myself" | Furtado; Dominic Matheson; Anjulie Persaud | Dom Dolla; Beanz^{[c]}; Persaud^{[c]} | 3:03 |
| 11. | "Fantasy" | Furtado; Gahunia; Williams; Sanbalian; Benjamin Katz; Beanz | T-Minus; Sanbalian; Furtado^{[c]}; Yordanov^{[c]} | 2:08 |
| 12. | "Better Than Ever" | Furtado; Hawken; Charmie | Hawken; Pipe Perez^{[c]}; Beanz^{[c]} | 2:11 |
| 13. | "Take Me Down" | Furtado; Williams; Gahunia; Bryn McCutcheon; Kirstyn Johnson | T-Minus; Beanz^{[c]} | 2:27 |
| 14. | "Untitled" | Furtado; Cazier | Cazier; Owen Pallett^{[b]} | 2:55 |
| Total length: | | | | 37:07 |

Notes

- ^{^a} signifies a co-producer
- ^{^b} signifies an additional producer
- ^{^c} signifies a vocal producer

Samples

- "Floodgate" contains a sample from "You" by Mei Ehara.

== Personnel ==
Musicians

- Nelly Furtado – vocals
- Herag Sanbalian – guitar, programming (tracks 1, 11); drums, synthesizer (1); synthesizer programming (11)
- Stephen Kirk – additional vocals (tracks 1, 12)
- Jim Beanz – additional vocals (tracks 2, 10–12)
- Anthony Yordanov – additional vocals (tracks 2, 11)
- Pacho Carnaval – additional vocals, flute (track 2)
- Jaime Alzate – additional vocals, percussion (track 2)
- José Castillo – additional vocals, guitar (track 2)
- Mamic Itoua – additional vocals (track 2)
- Sam Lewis – programming (tracks 3, 7); bass, drums, keyboards, violin (3)
- Gray Hawken – additional vocals (tracks 4, 8), piano (12)
- Drew Veloric – drums, programming, synthesizer programming (track 4)
- Will Lamoureux – violin (tracks 7, 11, 12)
- Billa Joints – guitar (track 7)
- Charlotte Day Wilson – vocals, piano (track 8)
- Taborah Johnson – additional vocals (track 9)
- Tynomi Banks – additional vocals (track 9)
- Mignone Moïse a.k.a. Williane 108 - vocals (track 9)
- Charmie Deller – additional vocals (tracks 9, 11)
- Anjulie Persaud – additional vocals (track 10)
- Dom Dolla – vocals (track 10)
- Nevis Gahunia – additional vocals (tracks 11, 13)
- Benny Bellson – additional vocals (track 11)
- Charlie Joy – additional vocals (track 11)
- Lido Pimienta – additional vocals (track 11)
- Jenna Andrews – additional vocals (track 12)

Technical

- Nelly Furtado - executive producer, additional A&R, production (tracks 2, 8), vocal production (track 11)
- Chris Smith - executive producer
- WondaGurl - production (track 1)
- T-Minus - production (tracks 2, 7, 9, 11, 13)
- Sam Lewis – production (tracks 3, 5), engineering (track 3)
- Jim Beanz – production (track 4), vocal production (tracks 1–2, 10, 12–13), engineering (tracks 4, 13)
- Totally Enormous Extinct Dinosaurs - production (track 5)
- Michael "Finatik" Mulé - production (track 6)
- Isaac "Zac" De Boni - production (track 6)
- Aaron Bow - production (track 6)
- Thislandis - production (track 6)
- Teddy Walton - production (track 6)
- Billa Joints - production (track 7), co-production (track 9), additional production (track 2)
- Charlotte Day Wilson – production (track 8)
- Dom Dolla – production, mixing (track 10)
- Herag Sanbalian – production (track 11), co-production (track 1), engineering (tracks 1, 11)
- Gray Hawken – production (track 12), vocal production (track 6), additional production (track 8)
- Oliver Cazier - production (track 14)
- Owen Pallett – additional production (track 14), string arrangement (track 9)
- Chris Gehringer – mastering
- Manny Marroquin – mixing (tracks 1–3, 5, 9, 12)
- Jaycen Joshua – mixing (tracks 4, 6, 7, 13)
- Anthony Yordanov – A&R, vocal production (tracks 7, 9, 11), mixing (track 8), co-mixing (11), engineering (2–4, 6–13)
- Lido Pimienta – additional A&R, production coordinator (track 2), string arrangement (track 9)
- Juro "Mez" Davis – mixing (track 11)
- Mamic Itoua – engineering (tracks 2, 3, 8, 13), mastering assistance (1, 7, 9), engineering assistance (10, 12)
- Juan Pena – engineering (track 2)
- Len Rodriguez – engineering (track 2)
- Ashley Jacobson – engineering (track 14)
- Charlie Joy – mastering assistance (tracks 1, 7, 9)
- Josh Lich – engineering assistance (track 9)
- Nevis Gahunia - A&R
- Evan Peters - A&R
- Valentin Herfray - art direction, photography
- Guillhaume Sbalchiero - graphic design, typography

== Charts ==
Chart performance for 7
| Chart (2024) | Peak position |
|---|---|
| Austrian Albums (Ö3 Austria) | 27 |
| Belgian Albums (Ultratop Flanders) | 76 |
| Belgian Albums (Ultratop Wallonia) | 185 |
| German Albums (Offizielle Top 100) | 35 |
| Swiss Albums (Schweizer Hitparade) | 27 |
| UK Album Downloads (OCC) | 37 |
| UK Album Sales (OCC) | 60 |
| UK Physical Albums (OCC) | 71 |
