= The Ride (Nelly Furtado album) =

2017 studio album by Nelly Furtado

Studio album by Nelly Furtado
- Released: March 31, 2017
- Recorded: 2016
- Studio: Elmwood Recording (Dallas, Texas); Revolution Recording (Toronto, Ontario); The Orange Lounge (Toronto, Ontario)
- Genre: Pop; indie pop
- Length: 45:37
- Label: Nelstar
- Producer: John Congleton

Nelly Furtado chronology
The Spirit Indestructible (2012)	The Ride (2017)	7 (2024)

Singles from The Ride
- 1. "Pipe Dreams" Released: December 20, 2016; 2. "Cold Hard Truth" Released: January 27, 2017; 3. "Flatline" Released: February 17, 2017; 4. "Phoenix" Released: March 10, 2017; 5. "Sticks & Stones" Released: May 25, 2018

The Ride is the sixth studio album released by Canadian singer-songwriter Nelly Furtado. It was released on March 31, 2017, by her own record label, Nelstar Music. It is her second independently released album after Mi Plan (2009).

== Background ==
Furtado initially worked with the producer Mark Taylor on material for The Ride. She had wanted to work with Taylor ever since he had produced "Broken Strings", her 2008 duet with the British singer-songwriter James Morrison. Shortly after splitting with her manager, Taylor sent Furtado an email informing her that he had written a song called "Sticks and Stones" (originally performed by the English singer-songwriter Arlissa), and said it would suit Furtado's voice. She responded by saying she loved the song and wanted to record it, but also expressed an interest in composing new songs with him and his regular collaborator Paul Barry. Working from Taylor's studio in Ripley, Surrey, "Phoenix" was the first song composed by the trio. Furtado said she "kind of hit bottom" a week before writing the song, elaborating that she had been going through a rough patch in her life at the time. The trio also composed "Bliss", which was included on the deluxe vinyl.

Furtado was introduced to the Dallas-based producer John Congleton in August 2014 by the American indie rock musician Annie Clark, better known as St. Vincent, whom Furtado first met in Japan in 2012. The material produced by Congleton is decidedly more artistic than anything previously released by Furtado. The first song they wrote together was "Flatline", which emerged from Congleton's criticism of the pre-prepared GarageBand demos Furtado had created in preparation for their sessions. She explained, "He didn't like anything. Then, luckily, I remembered this melody – the chorus of "Flatline" – and I sang it to him, and he was, 'Well, I like that. Let's do that.' He had already booked session players for the next day. I showed him my first draft of the lyrics for [the song] and he was tinkering away at the music, and he said, 'Those are all right, but I think you can do better. I think you can dig a little deeper.' And here I am – six albums in – and I'm just thinking: 'Wow. Okay.'" Furtado, who recorded a total of sixteen songs with Congleton, described the album's sound as "modern pop-alternative".

While recording The Ride, Congleton introduced Furtado to people involved in the local Texan art scene, including Samantha McCurdy, who created the album cover. It consists of Furtado clutching a bouquet of flowers and two hands holding a pyramid-shaped piece of wood behind her, while a green protrusion on the right side of the image closes in on her face. The cover proved divisive, with Furtado disabling comments on the image when it was posted on her Instagram account on December 12, 2016. She later said of the cover, "To me, it's a little bit vulnerable. I like that it conveys a feeling of humility," and explained that disabling comments on the image was in part a reaction to the negative response to her performance of "O Canada" at the 2016 NBA All-Star Game.

== Composition ==
The Ride has been described as a rock-influenced pop and indie pop album that incorporates elements of R&B ("Pipe Dreams"), synth-rock ("Sticks and Stones") and piano ballads ("Carnival Games", "Phoenix").

== Promotion ==
Furtado promoted the album by doing many interviews and performances with BBC Breakfast, Loose Women, Q, Larry King Now, Forbes, GQ, Refinery29, Billboard, Paper, Idolator, Maclean’s, The Today Show, and Late Night with Seth Meyers.

== Singles ==
"Pipe Dreams" was released as the first single on November 15, 2016. When asked if the song was the first single from the album, Furtado said that she would not be releasing any singles from the album and that she would instead release songs that she wants to share, "which is all twelve", but the song was released to airplay. Furtado released "Cold Hard Truth", along with the pre-order of the album, on January 27, 2017.

"Sticks & Stones" was remixed by Metro with newly recorded vocals by Furtado in May 2018. It reached number one on the Billboard Dance Club Songs chart.

=== Promotional singles ===
Furtado released "Behind Your Back", a song that she called "a palate cleanse" and "an appetizer" for her then-untitled sixth studio album, on July 13, 2016. Although she originally said that the song would not be included on the album, she later revealed that it would be included on the deluxe edition of the album. It was chosen to be the first song released from the album because it did not fit in with the sound of what she referred to as the "actual album". On September 7, 2016, Furtado revealed that she would release another song from the deluxe edition of the album called "Islands of Me". It was released two days later, on September 9, 2016. Both "Behind Your Back" and "Islands of Me" were only available on the music streaming platform Spotify until October 28, 2016, when they were made available to purchase on digital retailers.

== Critical reception ==
Professional ratings
Aggregate scores
Source	Rating
AnyDecentMusic?	6.1/10
Metacritic	64/100
Review scores
Source	Rating
AllMusic	3.5/5 stars
Clash	5/10
Exclaim!	6/10
The Guardian	2/5 stars
The Irish Times	3/5 stars
Now	3/5 Ns
Pitchfork	6.8/10
Rolling Stone	3.5/5 stars
RTÉ	3/5 stars
Slant Magazine	3.5/5 stars

At Metacritic, which assigns a normalized rating out of 100 to reviews from mainstream critics, the album received an average score of 64, based on 9 reviews, which indicates "generally favorable reviews". It also holds an aggregate score of 6.1 out of 10 at AnyDecentMusic?, based on 13 reviews.

Stephen Thomas Erlewine of AllMusic compared The Ride to Furtado's 2003 album Folklore, but said that "she hasn't abandoned the deep bass and dance beats that propelled Loose". Now complimented the record for incorporating harder elements; Exclaim! applauded Furtado for her lyricism. Lauren Murphy of The Irish Times also complimented the songwriting, praising the "beat-driven songs with air-punching choruses". While commenting on Furtado's statement that The Ride was her "hangover album", Murphy summarized her review by saying, "If this is the hangover album, we'd love to have been at the party." Slant Magazine also compared the album to Folklore, and praised Furtado's "refusal to play to type [which] ultimately makes her something of a pop maverick—impossible to pin down but also improbably distinct". Commenting on the album's commercial performance, a review from Billboard claimed it would be one of 2017's most underrated releases.

Although Clash complimented Furtado's vocals and songwriting, it was critical of Congleton's production, calling some of the electronic songs "jarring". Kate Hutchinson of The Guardian was also critical of his production, which she called "overpowering and overcomplicated". While comparing The Ride with the work of other artists, she said, "It's difficult to avoid making endless comparisons when an album feels so miserably storyboarded ... But at least The Ride does so with zeal."

== Commercial performance ==
The Ride reached number 76 in Canada and also reached the top 100 in Germany, Italy, and Switzerland, as well as the top 200 in Belgium. It did not chart on the UK Albums Chart, but reached number 81 on the UK Album Sales Chart. It also did not chart on the US Billboard 200 chart becoming Furtado's first studio album not to do so, but did peak at number 25 on the Independent Albums chart.

== Track listing ==
All tracks produced by John Congleton (track 6 co-produced by Mark Taylor).

The Ride track listing
No.	Title	Writer(s)	Length
1.	"Cold Hard Truth"	Nelly Furtado; John Congleton	2:54
2.	"Flatline"	Furtado; Congleton	3:21
3.	"Carnival Games"	Furtado	4:17
4.	"Live"	Furtado; Congleton	4:03
5.	"Paris Sun"	Furtado; Congleton	3:29
6.	"Sticks & Stones"	Mark Taylor; Patrick Mascall; Jamie Scott; Arlissa Ruppert; Furtado	3:34
7.	"Magic"	Furtado; Congleton	4:02
8.	"Pipe Dreams"	Furtado; Congleton	4:23
9.	"Palaces"	Furtado; Congleton	3:31
10.	"Tap Dancing"	Furtado; Liz Rose; Natalie Hemby	4:10
11.	"Right Road"	Furtado; Congleton	3:28
12.	"Phoenix"	Furtado; Paul Barry; Taylor	4:25
Total length:			45:37

Deluxe vinyl edition
No.	Title	Writer(s)	Length
13.	"Islands of Me"	Furtado; Congleton	3:42
14.	"Bliss"	Furtado; Taylor; Barry	3:19
15.	"Behind Your Back"	Furtado; Congleton; Bobby Sparks	3:47
Total length:			56:25

== Personnel ==
Credits below are adapted from The Ride's liner notes.

- Nelly Furtado – vocals
- John Congleton – production, mixing, engineering, bells, drum programming, guitar, keyboards, orchestra bells
- Mark Taylor – production, vocal engineering, vocal production (6)
- Bobby Sparks – ARP String Ensemble, bass, clavinet, Fender Rhodes, Hammond B3, Juno, Mellotron, Minimoog, grand piano, synthesizer
- Adam Pickrell – bass, Hammond B3, keyboards, Minimoog, piano, synthesizer, synthesizer strings
- Sean Kelly – acoustic guitar
- Alex Bhore – engineering assistance
- Jason "Metal" Donkersgoed – engineering assistance
- Luke Schindler – engineering assistance
- Greg Calbi – mastering
- Samantha McCurdy – design
- Jake Elliott – illustrations
- Joachim Johnson – photography

== Charts ==
Chart performance for The Ride
Chart (2017)	Peak position
Belgian Albums (Ultratop Wallonia)	141
Canadian Albums (Billboard)	76
German Albums (Offizielle Top 100)	65
Italian Albums (FIMI)	66
Swiss Albums (Schweizer Hitparade)	41
UK Album Sales (OCC)	81
UK Independent Albums (OCC)	14
US Independent Albums (Billboard)	25

== Release history ==
Release history for The Ride
Country	Date	Format	Label	Ref.
Germany	March 31, 2017	CD; digital download; LP; streaming	Eleven Seven Label Group	
United Kingdom	March 31, 2017	CD; digital download; LP; streaming	Eleven Seven Label Group	
United States	March 31, 2017	CD; digital download; LP; streaming	Nelstar	
