= Mi Plan Remixes =

Remix album by Nelly Furtado
- Released: October 25, 2010
- Genre: Club
- Length: 59:50
- Language: Spanish; English
- Label: Nelstar Entertainment; Universal Music Latino

Nelly Furtado chronology
Mi Plan (2009)	Mi Plan Remixes (2010)	The Best of Nelly Furtado (2010)

Mi Plan Remixes is a remix album by Canadian singer-songwriter Nelly Furtado, released on October 25, 2010 by Nelstar Entertainment. The album consists of twelve remixes of songs from her first Spanish album Mi Plan.

== Critical reception ==
Professional ratings
Review scores
Source	Rating
AllMusic	3/5 stars

Stephen Thomas Erlewine of AllMusic proclaimed, "while there's nothing quite essential among the remixes, they're all enjoyable and possess a more pronounced beat."

== Track listing ==
Mi Plan Remixes track listing
No.	Title	Writer(s)	Length
1.	"Fuerte" (original English version; featuring Concha Buika)	Nelly Furtado; Alex Cuba; James Bryan	2:50
2.	"Manos al Aire" (Robbie Rivera Radio Mix)	Furtado; Bryan; Cuba	3:32
3.	"Más" (Urban Remix; featuring Tony Dize)	Furtado; Lester Mendez; Andrés Recio	3:49
4.	"Bajo Otra Luz" (Humby Remix; featuring Mala Rodriguez)	Julieta Venegas; Maria Rodríguez	3:52
5.	"Fuerte" (Twisted Dee Club Mix; featuring Buika)	Furtado; Bryan; Cuba	8:38
6.	"Manos al Aire" (Juan Magan Remix)	Furtado; Bryan; Cuba	4:24
7.	"Más" (Rebirth Demolition Crew Mix)	Furtado; Mendez; Recio	6:26
8.	"Bajo Otra Luz" (Dancehall Yogi Remix; featuring Mala Rodriguez & The Wixard)	Venegas; Rodríguez	3:44
9.	"Fuerte" (Humby Urban Club Mix; featuring Buika)	Furtado; Bryan; Cuba	3:36
10.	"Manos al Aire" (Tiësto Remix)	Furtado; Bryan; Cuba	7:33
11.	"Bajo Otra Luz" (Rebirth Demolition Mix; featuring Mala Rodriguez)	Venegas; Rodríguez	3:26
12.	"Fuerte" (Cajjmere Wray Hot Sweat Mix)	Furtado; Cuba; Bryan	8:06
Total length:			59:50

== Charts ==
Chart performance for Mi Plan Remixes
Chart (2010)	Peak position
US Billboard Latin Pop Albums	16

== Release history ==
Release history for Mi Plan Remixes
Region	Date	Label
United States	October 25, 2010	Nelstar Entertainment; Universal Music Latino
