= Más (Nelly Furtado song) =

Single by Nelly Furtado

from the album Mi Plan
- Language: Spanish
- Released: November 4, 2009
- Recorded: 2009
- Studio: Orange Studios, Toronto; The Hit Factory, Miami; Cubejam, Miami
- Length: 3:31
- Label: Nelstar Entertainment; Universal Music Latino
- Songwriters: Nelly Furtado; Lester Mendez; Andrés Recio
- Producer: Lester Mendez

Nelly Furtado singles chronology
"Jump" (2009)	"Más" (2009)	"Morning After Dark" (2009)

Music video
- "Más" on YouTube

"Más" (English: "More") is a Spanish-language song recorded by Canadian singer-songwriter Nelly Furtado. It was released on December 18, 2009, and the first of four songs to be released during an iTunes promotion counting down the release to her fourth studio album, Mi Plan. The song was written by Nelly Furtado, Lester Mendez and Andrés Recio and produced by Lester Mendez.

== Commercial release ==
Más was released as a promotional download single on July 21, 2009. There were two different download packages available: a single version, which included two tracks, and an EP that includes both Más and six live acoustic performances recorded in Freiburg on June 3, 2009. The live songs are "Broken Strings", "Bajo Otra Luz", "Más", "Say It Right", "I'm Like a Bird" and "Manos al Aire".

== Music video ==
The music video premiered on Friday, November 13, 2009, on VIVA. The video is a continuation to the video for "Manos al Aire". It shows Furtado and her boyfriend in different situations. Scenes with Furtado singing in a room with a big mirror and an armchair are also featured. First, Furtado and her boyfriend are shown during breakfast. Furtado hands him the plate, but he does not look at her. Then he leaves and at night, when Furtado is already in bed, he comes home late and goes to bed, too, but he does not look at her again. Then they sit in the living-room; he is chatting on his laptop and when he leaves the room, she looks at it. She realizes that he betrays her. So she drives to the address and waits for her boyfriend and his affair to come out of the house. She gets out of the car and shouts at the two. She fights with her boyfriend and at the end of the video, she returns to her car, followed by her singing the last line of the song in front of the mirror.

== Lyrical content ==
"Más" deals with the dynamic of a problematic relationship, that slowly begins to fade. The singer wants to feel, live and be loved more (→ Más). Furtado describes it as a simple love song.

== Track listing ==
Digital single

1. "Más" – 3:31

Digital E.P.

1. "Más" – 3:31
2. "Broken Strings" (Live Acoustic) – 4:56
3. "Bajo Otra Luz" (Live Acoustic) – 4:01
4. "Más" (Live Acoustic) – 3:52
5. "Say It Right" (Live Acoustic) – 3:47
6. "I'm Like a Bird" (Live Acoustic) – 4:59
7. "Manos al Aire" (Live Acoustic) – 3:24

== Credits and personnel ==
- Produced and arranged by Lester Mendez
- Keyboards, bass and programming by Lester Mendez
- Acoustic and electric guitars by Matt Scannell
- Percussion by Rafael Padilla
- Engineered by Jason "Metal" Donkersgoed, Joel Numa and Lester Mendez
- Assistant Engineered by Cody Acosta and Miguel Bustamante

== Chart performance ==
Weekly chart performance for "Más"
Chart (2009–2010)	Peak position
Mexico (Billboard Mexican Airplay)	29
Slovakia Airplay (ČNS IFPI)	87
US Latin Pop Airplay (Billboard)	25

== Release history ==
Release dates and formats for "Más"
Region	Date	Format	Ref.
Various	July 21, 2009	Digital download (promotional single)	
Puerto Rico	November 4, 2009	Radio airplay	
United States	November 4, 2009	Radio airplay	
Italy	November 6, 2009	Radio airplay	
