= StayBent Krunk-a-Delic =

American songwriter and record producer

Hernst Bellevue
- Born: March 12, 1974 (age 52)
- Genres: Hip hop; R&B; Pop; Latin; Dance
- Occupations: Record producer; songwriter; DJ
- Instruments: keyboard; Guitar
- Years active: 2025–present
- Labels: Atlantic; Interscope; Def Jam; J Records; RCA Records; Columbia Records
- Website: www.krunkadelic.com

Hernst Bellevue Jr. (born March 12, 1974; better known by his stage name Krunk-a-Delic) is an American songwriter, hip hop, R&B, pop music and record producer. Krunk-a-Delic has written and produced gold and platinum records such as Jamie Foxx's "I Don't Know", Ludacris feat. Dtp's "Dtp for Life" (from Disturbing tha Peace) and Ms. Dynamite's "Afraid to Fly" (from A Little Deeper). He is a key collaborator on the production of Sean Paul's multi-platinum Billboard Hot 100 #1 hit "Temperature." He is also a contributor to Nelly Furtado's Latin Grammy winning and platinum album "Mi Plan." Krunk-a-Delic has written and produced records for Nelly Furtado, N-Dubz, Nina Sky, Lil' Flip, Lauren Spencer-Smith, Matisyahu, Shawnna, Jimmy Cozier, Alison Hinds, Jazmine Sullivan, I 20, Chris Webby, City Girls, Lunchmoney Lewis, as well songs recorded by Nas, Mary J. Blige, Jennifer Hudson, Ciara, Rick Ross, and more. In the past, he was known to frequently collaborate with producer Salaam Remi.

== Discography ==
Year	Song	Artist	Album	Label	Credit
2001	"Can't Get it Back"	Blaque	Unreleased	Columbia Records	Producer, Songwriter
2002	"Afraid to Fly"	Ms Dynamite	Little Deeper	Polydor Records	Producer, Songwriter
2003	"Can't Get it Back"	Mis-Teeq	Eye Candy	Telstar Records	Producer, Songwriter
2004	"Strawberrez"	Mis-Teeq	Eye Candy	Telstar Records	Producer, Songwriter
2004	"You and Your N***a"	Consequence	Take 'Em to the Cleaners		Producer, Songwriter
2005	"ABC( Salaam Remi Krunk-a-Delic Party Mix )"	The Jackson 5	Motown Remixed	Motown Records / Universal Records	Keyboards
2005	"Temperature"	Sean Paul	Trinity	Atlantic Records	Keyboards
2005	"DTP for Life"	Ludacris & DTP	Disturbing tha Peace	Def Jam Recordings	Producer, Songwriter
2006	"Who I Am" (Remix)	Tiffany Evans	Unreleased		Producer, Songwriter
2006	"Lil Daddy What's Good"	Shawnna	Block Music	DTP / Def Jam Recordings	Producer, Songwriter
2006	"You'z a Trick"	Lil' Flip	I Need Mine	Columbia Records	Producer, Songwriter
2007	"Thunda"	Allison Hinds	Soca Queen	1720 Ent / Black Coral	Producer
2008	"Open"	Noel Gourdin	After My Time	Epic Records	Producer
2008	"I Don't Know"	Jamie Foxx	Intuition	J Records	Producer
2008	"Down South"	I 20	Single	Koch Records	Producer, Songwriter
2008	"Come See Me Then"	I 20			Producer, Songwriter
2009	"Can't Let Go"	Shonie	Single	Slip N Slide Records	Producer, Songwriter, Keyboards
2009	"Now I'm That Bitch"	Livvi Franc	Now I'm That Bitch	Jive Records	Keyboards, Programming
2009	"Sufficiente Tiempo"	Nelly Furtado	Mi Plan	Interscope Records	Producer, Songwriter
2009	"Fuerte"	Nelly Furtado feat. Concha Buika	Mi Plan	Interscope Records	Keyboards, Drum Programming
2010	"On Some Bullsh*t"	Nina Skye	The Other Side		Producer, Songwriter, Keyboards
2010	"Click Flash"	Ciara	Sex and the City (Vol. 2): More Music	Water Tower/ New Line Cinema	Keyboards
2010	“My First Love”	Craig David	Sex And the City (Vol.2): More Music	Water Tower/ New Line Cinema	Vocals
2010	"Read the Manual"	Dennis	Blonde	EMI Music Netherlands	Producer, Vocal Producer
2010	"Mind Control"	Hal Linton	Single	Universal Records / Motown Records	Keyboards
2010	"Follow Us"	Big Boi	Sir Lucious Left Foot…The Son of Chico Dusty	Def Jam Recordings	Keyboards
2010	"Love in Me"	Faith Evans	Something About Faith	eOne	Programming
2010	"Night is Young"	Nelly Furtado	Best of Nelly Furtado	Interscope Records	Producer, Songwriter
2010	"Cold Shoulder"	N-Dubz	Love.Live.Life.	Def Jam Recordings	Producer, Songwriter
2010	"Love You Long Time"	Jazmine Sullivan	Love Me Back	J Records	Keyboards, Programming
2010	"Stuttering"	Jazmine Sullivan	Love Me Back	J Records	Keyboards
2011	"Feeling Good"	Jennifer Hudson	I Remember Me	Arista Records	Keyboards, Programming
2011	"Crocodile Rock"	Elton John & Nelly Furtado	Gnomeo & Juliet Soundtrack	Buena Vista	Keyboards, Drum Programming
2011	"It's a Tower Heist"	Nas & Rick Ross	Tower Heist Soundtrack	Back Lot Music/ Universal Pictures	Drum Programming
2011	"She Got Me"	Krunk-a-Delic	Tower Heist Soundtrack	Back Lot Music/ Universal Pictures	Producer, Songwriter
2011	"Bounce On It"	Cory Lee	Hot Pink Heart	SMC / Universal Records	Producer, Songwriter
2011	"Funkill"	Cory Lee	Hot Pink Heart	SMC / Universal Records	Producer, Songwriter
2011	"L.O.V.E."	Cory Lee	Hot Pink Heart	SMC / Universal Records	Producer, Songwriter
2012	"The Most Beautiful Thing"	Nelly Furtado	The Spirit Indestructible	Mosely Music / Interscope Records	Songwriter
2014	"Buss Shots"	Anjuli Stars	Featured on VH1 show "Make Or Break: The Linda Perry Project"		Producer, Songwriter
2014	"Let's Do It Again"	Chris Webby	Chemically Imbalanced	eOne	Producer, Songwriter
2017	"SWNGN"	The Monsters and the Strangerz	Nostalgia EP		Songwriter
2018	“Blue Jeans”	Mayila	‘’Star’’	Twentieth Century Fox Film Corporation	Producer, Songwriter
2019	“You Know That I Want You”	Jimmy Cozier	Louder Than Life Records		Producer, Songwriter
2019	“Pony”	LunchMoney Lewis feat. City Girls	Lunchbox Records		Producer, Songwriter
2021	“For Granted”	Lauren Spencer-Smith	Island Records		Producer, Songwriter
2022	“Recover”	Point North	Hopeless Records		Producer, Songwriter
2023	"Ripples"	Matisyahu			Producer, Songwriter
