= Corazón (Nelly Furtado and Bomba Estéreo song) =

Single by Nelly Furtado and Bomba Estéreo

from the album 7
- Language: English, Spanish
- Released: July 12, 2024
- Studio: The Orange Lounge (Toronto, ON); Engine Room (New York, NY); Paramount Studios (Los Angeles, CA)
- Genre: Dance-pop; dance
- Length: 2:37
- Label: Nelstar; 21
- Songwriters: Nelly Furtado; Tyler Williams; Nevis Gahunia; Jenna Andrews; Stephen Kirk; Steven Bilodeau; Liliana Saumet; Oliver Cazier
- Producers: T-Minus; Nelly Furtado

Nelly Furtado singles chronology
"Love Bites" (2024)	"Corazón" (2024)	"Honesty" (2024)

Bomba Estéreo singles chronology
"Algo Está Cambiando" (2024)	"Corazón" (2024)

Visualizer
- "Corazón" on YouTube

"Corazón" (English translation: "Heart") is a song by Canadian singer-songwriter Nelly Furtado and Colombian band Bomba Estéreo. It was released on July 12, 2024, through Nelstar Entertainment and 21 Entertainment Group, as the second single from Furtado's seventh studio album, 7. It was written by Nelly Furtado, Tyler Williams, Nevis Gahunia, Jenna Andrews, Stephen Kirk, Steven Bilodeau, Liliana Saumet and Oliver Cazier, and produced by T-Minus and Furtado.

An official visualizer accompanied the single, which features Furtado, Saumet, and Colombian-Canadian singer-songwriter Lido Pimienta on a white background, as well as a compilation of Furtado's live performances from 2023 to the present. On 1 January 2025, Furtado released the DJ Arana Remix to the song.

== Background and composition ==
After a five-year hiatus, Furtado started teasing new music, including a collaboration with Colombian band Bomba Estéreo. While recording new songs, she began performing at festivals, including Machaca Fest in Monterrey, Mexico, held on June 24, 2023, where she performed a short version of "Corazón", including only the first verse and the chorus. She confirmed a collaboration with Bomba Estéreo during an interview on Emily Ratajkowski's podcast High Low with EmRata. Almost a year later, on May 18, 2024, she performed again in Mexico, at Tecate Emblema festival, where she presented the song again, this time a longer version that included the second verse.

About recording the song, Furtado told Vogue that she had recorded it in three different cities. "Bomba Estéreo had a sold-out concert in Toronto, so I flew back from L.A. that day and made it to the show just in time. Afterwards, I was like, 'Li, you have to come to the studio and record a verse on this track I did—and I want the whole band to come.' I got the whole band into an Uber with all their instruments—Colombian flutes, drums, and guitars. The big Uber didn't come in time, so I stuffed them into a Subaru or something. We get to the studio, and I got tequila and chicken wings for everyone, and we just did it. About a month later, Li then recut her verse in New York City, and T-Minus and I finished it in L.A. It was such a labor of love."

About the lyrics, Furtado also stated that the essence of the song is that "we're just out here living and trying to do our best. Even when we make mistakes, it's coming from the heart. When it comes from the heart, it's never a mistake."

== Live performances ==
In summer 2024, Furtado performed at numerous music festivals in Mexico and Europe. She performed "Corazón" at the 2024 Isle of MTV in Malta, alongside her biggest hit singles.

== Track listing ==
=== Standard version ===
1. "Corazón" – 2:37
2. "Love Bites" – 2:48

=== Remixes ===
1. "Corazón" (DJ Arana Remix) - 2:07

== Personnel ==
- Nelly Furtado – songwriter, vocals, production
- Bomba Estéreo – songwriter, vocals, guitar, flute, percussion
- Tyler Williams a.k.a. T-Minus – songwriter, production
- Nevis Gahunia – songwriter
- Jenna Andrews – songwriter
- Stephen Kirk – songwriter
- Steven Bilodeau – songwriter
- Oliver Cazier – songwriter
- Billa Joints – additional production
- Jim Beanz – background vocals, vocal production
- Lido Pimienta – production coordinator
- Anthony Yordanov – recording engineer
- Mamic Itoua – recording engineer
- Len Rodriguez – recording engineer
- Juan Peña – recording engineer
- Manny Marroquin – mixing engineer
- Chris Gehringer – mastering engineer

== Charts ==
Chart performance for "Corazón"
Chart (2024)	Peak position
Canada CHR/Top 40 (Billboard)	14
