= Love Bites (Nelly Furtado, Tove Lo and SG Lewis song) =

Single by Nelly Furtado featuring Tove Lo and SG Lewis

from the album 7
- Released: May 22, 2024
- Genre: Dance-pop
- Length: 2:48
- Label: Nelstar; 21
- Songwriters: Nelly Furtado; Samuel George Lewis; Tove Nilsson
- Producer: SG Lewis

Nelly Furtado singles chronology
"Gala y Dalí" (2024)	"Love Bites" (2024)	"Corazón" (2024)

Tove Lo singles chronology
"Elevator Eyes" (2023)	"Love Bites" (2024)	"Heat" (2024)

SG Lewis singles chronology
"Simple Times" (2024)	"Love Bites" (2024)	"Heat" (2024)

Official visualizer
- "Love Bites" on YouTube

"Love Bites" is a song by Canadian singer-songwriter Nelly Furtado from her seventh studio album, 7. The song is a collaboration with Swedish singer-songwriter Tove Lo and British record producer SG Lewis. It was released on May 22, 2024, through Nelstar Entertainment and 21 Entertainment Group, as the album's lead single. It was written by Furtado, Tove Lo and SG Lewis, and produced by Lewis. The trio released a remix by Don Diablo on June 28, 2024.

An official visualizer video, directed by Gemma Warren, accompanied the single and it features Furtado, Lo and Lewis in a red room, in a black room and on a red car.

== Background and composition ==
After a five-year performing hiatus, Furtado performed at Beyond the Valley festival in Australia on December 31, 2022. There, she met SG Lewis, another performer at the festival, whom she invited to sing "All Good Things (Come to an End)" live with her. After the festival, Furtado met up in the studio with Lewis and Tove Lo, and had this song that needed a chorus. As Furtado states, Lo brought them the chorus, "and all these catchy things, because she's Tove Lo. She's really special and her voice blew me away in the studio. She sounds like an actual angel", Furtado adds.

Musically, the song has been described as a "flirtatious, club-ready dance-pop banger" and like a "sultry dance anthem" that channels the energy and escapism of dance floors and live DJ sets that sparked Furtado's inspiration. "I felt called back to music from the DJ community," she said in a press release, "DJs were remixing my songs at concerts, clubs, and on social media, and I realized how much people like to dance and escape to my music. It's the healthiest vice you can have, and I love the opportunity to write music that lets people escape more than anything."

It is also the first release from Tove Lo since releasing the Extended Cut of her album, Dirt Femme last year, on which Lewis produced two songs. "We just really click. I just love writing with him," Lo said about working with Lewis ahead of Dirt Femme's release. Lo and Lewis also recorded a collab EP together, Heat, released on 14 June 2024, about a month after “Love Bites”.

The artist trio had been teasing the release of "Love Bites" for several weeks on social media, sharing snippets of the track.

== Live performances ==
Furtado performed "Love Bites" at the 2024 Mighty Hoopla festival. On July 16, 2024, she performed the single at the Isle of MTV concert in Malta.

== Track listing ==
Digital download and stream

1. "Love Bites" – 2:48

7" vinyl

1. "Love Bites" – 2:48
2. "Love Bites" (instrumental) – 2:48

Don Diablo remix

1. "Love Bites" (Don Diablo remix) – 3:41

== Personnel ==
- Nelly Furtado – vocals, songwriter
- Tove Lo – vocals, songwriter
- SG Lewis – songwriter, bass, keyboards, violin, drums, producer, recording engineer
- Anthony Yordanov – recording engineer
- Mamic Itoua – recording engineer
- Manny Marroquin – mixing engineer
- Chris Gehringer – mastering engineer

== Charts ==
2024 weekly chart performance
Chart (2024)	Peak position
Canada CHR/Top 40 (Billboard)	36
Czech Republic Airplay (ČNS IFPI)	48
Germany Download (Official German Charts)	66
UK Vinyl Singles (Official Charts Company)	6
US Dance/Mix Show Airplay (Billboard)	2
US Hot Dance/Electronic Songs (Billboard)	21

2026 weekly chart performance
Chart (2026)	Peak position
Honduras Anglo Airplay (Monitor Latino)	6
