= Loose: The Concert =

Live album / video by Nelly Furtado
- Released: November 16, 2007
- Recorded: April 4, 2007; June 7, 2007; June 21, 2007
- Venue: Air Canada Centre; Wamu Theater at Madison Square Garden; Paramount Theatre
- Length: 56:01 (CD); 86:25 (DVD)
- Language: English; Portuguese; Spanish
- Label: Geffen
- Director: Raphael Ouellet; Aaron A
- Producer: Thom Panunzio

Nelly Furtado chronology
Loose (2006)	Loose: The Concert (2007)	Mi Plan (2009)

Professional ratings
Review scores
Source	Rating
AllMusic	3/5 stars

Loose: The Concert is a live album by Canadian singer Nelly Furtado. The DVD was recorded at Air Canada Centre in Toronto, Ontario. The CD was recorded at the Wamu Theater at Madison Square Garden in New York City and the Paramount Theatre in Oakland, California during the Get Loose Tour. The DVD and accompanying CD of the concert were released on November 16, 2007.

== Background ==
Nelly Furtado released her first live CD/DVD after the huge success of her third album Loose which was released over one year before the release of her DVD especially that her album has been certified gold or platinum in 31 countries and global sales have surpassed nine million. The DVD originated from the Get Loose Tour concert that happened on the April 4, 2007 at the Air Canada Centre in Toronto. It was directed by Raphael Ouellet with Aaron A who was also an audio engineer. A DVD extra includes a 30-minute documentary of the tour.

== Track listing ==
Loose: The Concert – CD
No.	Title	Length
1.	"Afraid"	1:38
2.	"Say It Right"	4:10
3.	"Do It"	5:04
4.	"Wait for You"	3:28
5.	"Showtime"	7:48
6.	"All Good Things (Come to an End)"	4:40
7.	"I'm Like a Bird"	5:51
8.	"Glow" / "Heart of Glass"	5:46
9.	"No Hay Igual"	4:57
10.	"Promiscuous"	6:56
11.	"Maneater"	5:43
Total length:		56:01

Loose: The Concert – DVD
No.	Title	Length
1.	"Intro (Afraid)" / "Say It Right"	5:35
2.	"Turn Off the Light"	4:46
3.	"Powerless (Say What You Want)"	3:27
4.	"Do It" / "Wait for You"	8:02
5.	"Showtime"	7:07
6.	"Crazy"	4:03
7.	"In God's Hands"	4:39
8.	"Try"	5:43
9.	"All Good Things (Come to an End)"	4:28
10.	"Give It to Me"	2:53
11.	"I'm Like a Bird"	5:22
12.	"Glow" / "Heart of Glass"	5:31
13.	"Força"	4:52
14.	"Promiscuous"	6:21
15.	"Party" / "No Hay Igual"	8:25
16.	"Maneater"	7:51
Total length:		86:25

== Charts ==
Chart (2007)	Peak position
Swiss Albums (Schweizer Hitparade)	50
UK Music Videos (OCC)	32

== Certifications ==
Region	Certification	Certified units/sales
Portugal (AFP)	Platinum	20,000^{^}
^{^} Shipments figures based on certification alone.

== Release history ==
Release dates and formats for Loose: The Concert
Region	Date	Format	Label	Ref.
Germany	November 16, 2007	DVD; DVD+CD	Universal	
United Kingdom	November 19, 2007	DVD	Universal	
Australia	December 3, 2007	CD	Universal	
Canada	December 4, 2007	CD	Universal	
United States	December 4, 2007	DVD	Universal	
