= Win or Lose (Zero Assoluto song) =

Single by Zero Assoluto featuring Nelly Furtado
- Released: May 11, 2008 (Germany); October 27, 2008 (French)
- Length: 4:08

Zero Assoluto singles chronology
"Meglio Cosi" (2007)	"Win or Lose" (2008)	"Per dimenticare" (2009)

Nelly Furtado singles chronology
"In God's Hands" (2007)	"Win or Lose" (2008)	"Broken Strings" (2008)

"Win or Lose" is a single by Zero Assoluto featuring Canadian singer-songwriter Nelly Furtado.

== Release ==
The song was released on May 11, 2008 in Germany, but in Italy the Italian version of this track (without Furtado) had been released in 2007 with the title "Appena Prima Di Partire".

== Formats and track listings ==
German CD single (Trendsingle)

1. "Win Or Lose (Appena Prima Di Partire)" (Radio Version) – 4:08
2. "Appena Prima Di Partire" (Album Version) – 3:20

German maxi-CD single

1. "Win Or Lose (Appena Prima Di Partire)" (featuring Nelly Furtado) (Radio Version) – 4:08
2. "Appena Prima Di Partire" (Album Version) – 3:20
3. "Ora Che Ci Sei" – 3:54
4. "Win Or Lose (Appena Prima Di Partire)" (featuring Nelly Furtado) (Video) – 4:23

French CD single

1. "Win Or Lose (Appena Prima Di Partire)" (featuring Nelly Furtado) (Radio Version)
2. "Win Or Lose (Appena Prima Di Partire)" (featuring Nelly Furtado) (English Version)

== Charts ==
Chart (2008)	Peak position
France (SNEP)	31
Germany (GfK)	64
