= Night Is Young =

Single by Nelly Furtado

from the album The Best of Nelly Furtado
- Released: October 12, 2010
- Studio: Instrument Zoo (Miami, Florida)
- Genre: Dance-pop
- Length: 3:32
- Label: Geffen
- Songwriters: Nelly Furtado, Salaam Remi, Hernst Bellevue
- Producers: Salaam Remi, StayBent Krunk-a-Delic

Nelly Furtado singles chronology
"Hot-n-Fun" (2010)	"Night Is Young" (2010)	"Is Anybody Out There?" (2012)

Music video
- "Night Is Young" on YouTube

"Night Is Young" is a song by Canadian recording artist Nelly Furtado. It was written by Furtado, Salaam Remi and StayBent Krunk-a-Delic, and produced by the latter pair for Furtado's greatest hits compilation album, The Best of Nelly Furtado (2010). The song follows a dance and electronic style, which Furtado said that she is happy with because she never had a straightforward dance-pop song. The lyrics to the song were written by Furtado, who said it is "not necessarily a love song" but is about "having a good time and enjoying life."

The song premiered on BBC Radio 1 on October 3, 2010, and was released for digital downloading on October 12, 2010. The song itself received positive critical reception. It was described as being a "feel good dance-pop" song and for having a "having a rather infectious beat and a great sing-along chorus." The song was most successful in Slovakia, peaking at number seven on its charts. It also reached the top twenty on the Canadian Hot 100 and was moderately successful elsewhere, where it charted. The music video for the song was directed by Alan Ferguson and was filmed for two days in the downtown area of Toronto in Canada.

== Background and writing ==
"Night Is Young" was written by Nelly Furtado, Salaam Remi and StayBent Krunk-a-Delic, and produced by the latter pair. It was one of two songs that had not been properly finished and had leaked onto the internet. In response to the leaks, Furtado said that she decided to "finish them and put them out properly on the greatest hits album." In an interview with Beatweek, Furtado said that a conversation between her and a friend about the "past, present & future" is what inspired the concept of the song. Furtado said that the song is not necessarily a love song, adding that it is about relationships in many different forms [...] and having a good time and enjoying life. Furtado said that she was happy with the song because she never had a "straightforward song that has been dance-pop." She cited "[I]t’s definitely a pop track, but it’s obviously quite a high BPM. I think it’s 130 or something. It’s a really fast song." When writing the song, Furtado said that it started out as a poem before she presented the lyrics to Salaam Remi. She recalled, "I wrote all the lyrics and then I came to the studio and Salaam had this really great beat." It was mixed by Robert Orton, and recorded by Franklin Socorro and Gleyder Disla at Instrument Zoo studio in Miami, Florida.

== Critical reception ==
Amar Toor of AOL Radio characterized the song as "electrically charged pulse that persists from jolting start to glorious finish." Digital Spy's Nick Levine gave the song 4 out of 5 stars, calling it a "feel good dance-pop" song. Levine also commended Furtado's vocals, saying that her "ever-distinctive vocals and a chorus as stealthily catchy as a self-mutating virus." About.com described the song as "having a rather infectious beat and a great sing-along chorus." Jonathan Keefe of Slant Magazine described the song as a "four-four stomp, swirling electronic effects, and club-and-party lyrics." He also mentioned that the song "signals another outward shift in Furtado's style."

== Commercial performance ==
"Night Is Young" was most commercially successful in Slovakia, peaking at number seven in its sixth week on the Radio Top 100 chart. The song was a commercial failure in Austria, debuting on the charts at number 72. It then peaked at number 69 the next week and fell off the charts the following week after that. "Night Is Young" was moderately successful in the Czech Republic, entering the charts at number 37 and peaking at number 36 two weeks later. The song spent three more weeks on the chart before dropping out at number 54.

== Music video ==
The music video for "Night Is Young" was directed by Alan Ferguson and filmed in Downtown Toronto, Ontario, Canada on the days of October 13 and 14 in 2010. Fefe Dobson appears in the video, playing a DJ. The video begins with Furtado conducting a choir. During this, a male and female member of the choir look at each other while performing. For the video shoot, fans of Furtado were cast to be featured as cyclists, dancers and party-goers. After the choir performs, Furtado and the members of the choir, including the night cyclists, dancers, skaters and young people are seen going to a party. At the end of the video, the male and female, previously seen at the beginning of the video, kiss as the clip ends.

== Other versions ==
Furtado has recorded a live acoustic version of "Night Is Young" for Walmart Soundcheck, and a video was recorded and released. A remix was released, which has been played on BBC Radio 1Xtra, and was produced by Sketch iz Dead. It features grime recording artist Wiley. A remix EP of "Night Is Young" has been released on iTunes. The remixes were produced by Burns and Manhattan Clique. In early January, remixes produced by Jamaican producer The Wizard were released, entitled, "Night Is Young (Psychadelic Remix)" and "Night Is Young (Drum Groove Remix)".

== Formats and track listings ==
- Digital download
1. "Night Is Young" — 3:32
- Digital download (UK Version)
1. "Night Is Young" — 3:32
2. "The Best of Nelly Furtado Minimix" — 4:51
- Digital download (The Remixes)
1. "Night Is Young" (Burns Dub Remix) — 6:17
2. "Night Is Young" (Burns Vocal Remix) — 6:48
3. "Night Is Young" (Manhattan Clique Remix) — 6:50
- Digital download (The Remixes Part 2)
1. "Night Is Young" (Eclectic Dancehall Mix) — 3:59
2. "Night Is Young" (Psychadelically Wiz Mix) — 3:59
- Digital download (UK Remixes Version)
1. "Night Is Young" (Sketch Iz Dead Radio Remix) featuring Wiley — 3:27
2. "Night Is Young" (Remix by FrankMusik "Montreal Mist Edit") — 4:29
3. "Night Is Young" (Manhattan Clique Remix – Edit) — 3:38

== Personnel ==
Credits are adapted from the liner notes of The Best of Nelly Furtado.

- Nelly Furtado – lead vocals, background vocals
- Salaam Remi – producer, arranger, drums, keyboards
- StayBent Krunk-a-Delic – producer, arranger, drums, keyboards
- Franklin Emmanuel Socorro – recording engineer
- Gleyder Disla – recording engineer
- Robert Orton – mixing engineer
- Greg Calbi – mastering

== Charts ==
Chart (2010–11)	Peak position
Austria (Ö3 Austria Top 40)	69
Belgium (Ultratip Bubbling Under Flanders)	10
Belgium (Ultratip Bubbling Under Wallonia)	32
Canada (Canadian Hot 100)	20
Canada AC (Billboard)	44
Canada CHR/Top 40 (Billboard)	13
Canada Hot AC (Billboard)	9
Czech Republic Airplay (ČNS IFPI)	36
Hungary (Editors' Choice Top 40)	31
Netherlands (Dutch Top 40)	33
Polish Dance Chart (ZPAV)	41
Portugal (Portugal Digital Songs)	9
Russia (Top Hit Weekly Audience Choice)	69
Slovakia Airplay (ČNS IFPI)	7

== Release history ==
Country	Date	Format	Label	Ref.
United States	October 19, 2010	Digital download	Geffen	
United States	November 9, 2010	Digital download (The Remixes)	Geffen	
United Kingdom	December 5, 2010	Digital download (UK Version)	Polydor	
United Kingdom	December 5, 2010	Digital download (UK Remixes Version)	Polydor	
United States	December 7, 2010	Digital download (The Remixes Part 2)	Geffen	
