= Gala y Dalí =

"GALA Y DALÍ"

Single by Nelly Furtado and Juanes
- Language: Spanish; English
- Released: March 28, 2024
- Recorded: August 2023
- Studio: Orange Lounge (Toronto, Canada)
- Genre: Latin pop; bachata
- Length: 2:47
- Label: Nelstar
- Songwriters: Juan Esteban Aristizábal; Alexis Díaz Pimienta; Nelly Furtado; Andrés Torres; Mauricio Rengifo
- Producers: Juanes; Torres; Rengifo; Sebastian Krys; Felipe Contreras

Nelly Furtado singles chronology
"Keep Going Up" (2023)	"GALA Y DALÍ" (2024)	"Love Bites" (2024)

Juanes singles chronology
"506" (2022)	"Gala y Dalí" (2024)

Music video
- "Gala y Dalí" on YouTube

"Gala y Dalí" (stylized in all caps) is a song by Canadian singer-songwriter Nelly Furtado and Colombian singer-songwriter Juanes. It was released on March 28, 2024 under Furtado's own record label Nelstar Entertainment with distribution by Universal Music Latino. It marked their fourth collaboration, following "Fotografía" (2002), Spanish version of "Powerless (Say What You Want)" (2004) and "Te Busqué" (2006).

== Background ==
In August 2023, Nelly Furtado and Juanes recorded the track in Toronto and teased it on social media. Juanes said about the song: "For me, it’s a profound delight to be with Nelly. It means a lot because we have shared a big part of our lives since ‘Fotografía’ until now." He explained that on the song, Furtado guided him and helped him tap into a new sounds. "Nelly takes me to a place of joy and light. I could give myself an opportunity to break away from my sound, from what I play on the guitar, to go to a more Caribbean, so to speak, more danceable sound, which Nelly also wanted to have in this song." Furtado called it a "very positive song, like a ray of sunshine,” and spoke about her connection to Juanes. "We are crazy about music, that is why we are friends."

About the origin of the song, Furtado explained that she and Juanes had not been in contact for ten years until one day he called her on her cell phone. He told her that he had found a cassette tape with a song he had written and composed 20 years earlier that he believed was perfect for her. He had lost it in a backpack and hadn’t heard it since. "A friend had his backpack sitting around at his house all these years and he finally gave it back to him. Inside the backpack was this brilliant song. It wasn’t completed, so he asked me to record on it," she explained. After helping to develop the song, the pair went into the studio to record. "We recorded it in the same studio where we recorded 'Te Busque,' so it was a bit like a time warp," Furtado added. "There’s just so much nostalgia. We reference 'Fotografía' in the song, so we’re self-referencing, which I’m having so much fun with."

The title of the song make reference to Spanish artist Salvador Dalí and his wife Gala Dalí. Musically, the song fuses elements of bachata and pop. Lyrically, Furtado stated the song is about one of the greatest loves in history, that was "complex and beautiful". Also, in the lyrics, the artists reference "Fotografía", the first song they recorded together. One part referencing the song is: "Tengo esa fotografía, en mi corazón está guardada/Y desde 2002 quedé enamorada", mentioning the title of the song and the year it was recorded. The other one is near the end of "Gala y Dalí", when Furtado sings: "Cuando hay un abismo desnudo/Que se opone entre los dos", referencing the first line of her verse in "Fotografía".

== Personnel ==
- Nelly Furtado – vocals, songwriter
- Juanes – vocals, guitar, songwriter, producer
- Alexis Díaz Pimienta – songwriter
- Andrés Torres – guitar, keyboards, songwriter, producer, programming, recording engineer
- Mauricio Rengifo – background vocals, keyboards, songwriter, producer, programming, recording engineer
- Sebastian Krys – bass, producer
- Felipe Contreras – producer
- Tom Norris – mixing engineer, mastering engineer

== Charts ==
Chart performance for "Gala y Dalí"
Chart (2024)	Peak position
US Latin Pop Airplay (Billboard)	14

== Release history ==
Release dates and formats for "Gala y Dalí"
Region	Date	Format(s)	Label	Ref.
Various	March 28, 2024	Digital download; streaming	Nelstar Entertainment	
