= Cold Hard Truth (song) =

Single by Nelly Furtado

from the album The Ride
- Released: January 27, 2017
- Genre: Electro-funk
- Length: 2:54
- Label: Nelstar
- Songwriter(s): Nelly Furtado; John Congleton
- Producer(s): John Congleton

Nelly Furtado singles chronology
"Pipe Dreams" (2016)	"Cold Hard Truth" (2017)	"Flatline" (2017)

"Cold Hard Truth" is a song by Canadian singer and songwriter Nelly Furtado. It was officially released on January 27, 2017, as the second single for her sixth studio album, The Ride (2017). The single was written and produced by John Congleton and Nelly Furtado. The song was performed for the first time on national Canadian television on January 26 evening, during Furtado's appearance on Late Night With Seth Meyers. The song is about lovers who have to part ways.

== Critical reception ==
Laurence Day of The Line of Best Fit wrote that "Cold Hard Truth" is a powerful, fist-pumping preview of Furtado's exciting new release - it's stuffed with punchy beats and propelled by a rock-solid bassline, with boisterous pop melodies ready to get stuck in your brain for days." Joey Nolfi of Entertainment Weekly called the song "a funky, upbeat toe-tapper complete with cowbell and wobbly synths". Craig Jenkins of Vulture observed, "The withering electro-funk opener "Cold Hard Truth" surges with confidence after a breakup, but the newfound independence in the chorus... gives off a sense that it's her own preferred methods of making and selling music getting the boot, not some smarmy beau."

== Release history ==
Region	Release date	Format
Various	January 27, 2017	Digital download
