= Pipe Dreams (Nelly Furtado song) =

Single by Nelly Furtado

from the album The Ride
- Released: December 20, 2016
- Genre: R&B
- Length: 4:23
- Label: Nelstar Entertainment
- Songwriters: Nelly Furtado; John Congleton
- Producer: John Congleton

Nelly Furtado singles chronology
"Waiting for the Night" (2012)	"Pipe Dreams" (2016)	"Cold Hard Truth" (2017)

Music video
- "Pipe Dreams" on YouTube

"Pipe Dreams" is a song recorded by Canadian singer and songwriter Nelly Furtado. It was released on December 20, 2016 as the lead single for her sixth studio album, The Ride (2017). The single was produced by John Congleton.

== Composition ==
"Pipe Dreams" is described as a mid-tempo, gospel-tinged R&B song. It closes with an organ solo. According to Furtado, the single talks about the false hope of dreaming. The single has a theme of a fantasy world. Furtado said about the lyrical content:

"A lot of [The Ride] touches on that, in terms of sanity versus reality. The comedown, the hangover after the rush, and how you put the pieces back together, and how you make amends with the realer parts of life."

— Nelly Furtado, The Fader

== Music video ==
The music video for "Pipe Dreams" was released on December 20, 2016. It is filmed through a VHS lens.

== Release history ==
Region	Release date	Format
Various	December 20, 2016	Digital download
