= Fuerte (song) =

Promotional single by Nelly Furtado featuring Concha Buika

from the album Mi Plan
- Language: Spanish
- Released: 26 October 2010
- Studio: Instrument Zoo (Miami, Florida, United States); Casa Limón Studios (Madrid, Spain)
- Length: 3:24
- Label: Nelstar Entertainment; Universal Music Latino
- Songwriters: Nelly Furtado; Alex Cuba; James Bryan
- Producer: Salaam Remi

Music video
- "Fuerte" on YouTube

"Fuerte" (English: "Strong") is a Latin pop song by Canadian recording artist Nelly Furtado featuring Spanish flamenco artist Concha Buika, from her fourth studio album, Mi Plan (2009). It was written by Furtado, James Bryan and Alex Cuba, while production and arrangements were handled by Salaam Remi.

No official date was set for the release of the song. However, a promotional remix album was sent to clubs and has charted on the US Billboard Hot Dance Club Songs chart, where it peaked at number three. Most critics called the song a standout track from Mi Plan and have praised Concha Buika's appearance on the song. A music video has been released for the song.

== Background and writing ==
"Fuerte" was written by Nelly Furtado, Alex Cuba and James Bryan, and produced by hip hop producer Salaam Remi. It is a Latin pop song with influences of techno and flamenco music and it "fuses the Latin sound with an '80s vibe", according to Mayer Nissim, of Digital Spy. It was recorded by Ryan Evans at Instrument Zoo studios in Miami, Florida, and Casa Limón Studios in Madrid Spain. It was mixed by Franklin Socorro at Glenwood Place Studios in Burbank, California.

== Reception ==
Jaime Gill, a writer for Yahoo! Music UK, claimed that "Fuerte" is "by far the best and most convincing" song from the album. The writer noted the appearance of Concha Buika, calling the collaboration "the album's most exciting." Digital Spy's Mayer Nissim expressed a similar sentiment, saying that the song "boasts great backing vocals from flamenco singer Concha Buika". Leah Greenblatt of Entertainment Weekly called "Fuerte" a "Timba-lite groove" and expressed that it is the only "decent" song on the album.

In August 2010, "Fuerte" debuted on the US Billboard Hot Dance Club Songs chart at number 37. The following week, it ascended up the chart from number 37 to number 13. On its eighth week on the chart, it landed into the top ten at number six. It eventually peaked at number three, where it stayed for three consecutive weeks until it began descending down the chart. The song landed at number 81 on the US Billboard 2010 year-end Top 105 Club chart.

== Music video ==
Furtado and Concha Buika in the music video for "Fuerte"

The music video for "Fuerte" was directed by Richard Bernardin, Robacho Buika and Aaron A. The music video has been released by Nelstar Entertainment to Apple's iTunes Store on October 22, 2010. The video was also made available on VEVO on October 22, 2010.

Synopsis

In the video, Furtado is shown in various elegant dresses wandering around a lavishly decorated house before descending into its indoor swimming pool as the chorus begins. During the second and third choruses, Concha Buika also features, though appearing separately from Furtado, standing at the bottom of a staircase in a more modern-day building.

== Track listing ==
- Remix CD promo – Promotional only
1. "Fuerte" (Cajjmere Wray Hot Sweat Edit) — 3:03
2. "Fuerte" (Cajjmere Wray Hot Sweat Mix) — 8:06
3. "Fuerte" (Cajjmere Wray Spanglish Club Mix) — 7:51
4. "Fuerte" (Cajjmere Wray Spanglish Edit) — 3:07
5. "Fuerte" (Twisted Dee Club Mix) — 8:38
6. "Fuerte" (Twisted Dee Dubstrumental) — 7:08
7. "Fuerte" (Twisted Dee Electro-Tribe Mix) — 9:09
8. "Fuerte" (Twisted Dee Radio Edit) — 4:14
9. "Fuerte" (Massi and DeLeon Sunset Blvd Mixshow) — 5:02
10. "Fuerte" (Massi and DeLeon Sunset Blvd Mix) — 7:38

== Personnel ==
Credits are adapted from the Mi Plan liner notes.

Production

- Salaam Remi – producer, arrangements, keyboards, drums
- Staybent Krunk-A-Delic – guitar
- Vincent Henry – guitar
- Franklin Emmanuel Soccoro – engineering, recording, mixing
- Ryan Evans – engineering, recording
- Javier Limón – guitar solo

Recording

- Recorded at Instrumental Zoo, Miami, Florida, and Casa Limón Studio, Madrid, Spain
- Mixed at Glenwood Place Studios, Burbank, California

== Charts ==
Chart (2010)	Peak position
Czech Republic (IFPI)	47
US Billboard Hot Dance Club Songs	3
