= Bajo Otra Luz =

Single by Nelly Furtado featuring Julieta Venegas and La Mala Rodríguez

from the album Mi Plan
- Language: Spanish
- Released: January 1, 2009
- Recorded: 2008–2009
- Studio: The Hit Factory Criteria (Miami, FL)
- Genre: Latin pop
- Length: 4:19 (album version); 3:35 (radio edit)
- Label: Nelstar Entertainment; Universal Music Latino
- Songwriters: Julieta Venegas; María "La Mala" Rodríguez (rap)
- Producers: Nelly Furtado; Julieta Venegas; The Demolition Crew

Nelly Furtado singles chronology
"Who Wants to Be Alone" (2010)	"Bajo Otra Luz" (2009)	"Hot-n-Fun" (2010)

Julieta Venegas singles chronology
"Algún Día" (2008)	"Bajo Otra Luz" (2009)	"Bien o Mal" (2010)

Mala Rodríguez singles chronology
"Volveré" (2007)	"Bajo Otra Luz" (2009)	"No Pidas Perdón" (2010)

Music video
- "Bajo Otra Luz" on YouTube

"Bajo Otra Luz" (English: "Under Another Light") is a song recorded by Canadian singer-songwriter Nelly Furtado featuring guest vocals from Mexican singer-songwriter Julieta Venegas and Spanish singer-rapper La Mala Rodríguez. It was released on May 4, 2010, as the third and final single and also during a special iTunes promotion counting down to the release of her fourth studio album, Mi Plan. The song was written entirely by Venegas and also the song was later released for radio airplay the same day of release.

== Commercial release ==
"Bajo Otra Luz" was released as promotional download single on August 31, 2009, as part of the countdown to the release of Mi Plan. It was the third track to be lifted for a promotional release. The version released to iTunes does not include Julieta Venegas' vocals, as she was unable to record vocals for the single edit due to pregnancy. Instead, Spanish singer Celia Palli recorded vocals for the single edit.

== Music video ==
According to Furtado's Twitter account, the music video for "Bajo Otra Luz" was recorded between May 15 and 16, 2010. Julieta Venegas does not appear in the video because of her pregnancy. The video was released July 1, 2010 and features Furtado and La Mala Rodríguez through the streets of Little Italy, Toronto wearing different costumes and suits. Furtado expresses the theme of the video to being humorous and fun. Wearing popular costumes such as a cavewoman, she-devil, Bjork's swan dress, Native American, Britney Spears and even paying homage to the Wizard of Oz's Dorothy character. On Furtado's Vevo page, as of October 2015, "Bajo Otra Luz" has received over 9,300,000 views.

== Lyrical content ==
The lyrics talk about a new relationship, which the protagonist is very proud of because she feels that her life has completely changed. Verses like "El color de mi vida cambió desde que tú llegaste" ("The colour of my life changed since you came") showcase the song's meaning. The song was completely written by Julieta Venegas, and includes a rap verse in the bridge which was written and performed by La Mala Rodríguez. Amongst all of Furtado's releases, this is one of the few in which she does not have credit for writing.

== Track listing ==
1. "Bajo Otra Luz" (Album Version) – 4:19
2. "Bajo Otra Luz" (Single Edit) – 3:35

== Credits and personnel ==
- Produced and arranged by Demacio Castellón, Nelly Furtado and Julieta Venegas
- Co-produced by Michael Anthony
- Engineered by Demacio Castellón and Julian Vazquez
- Assistant engineered by Jason "Metal" Donkersgoed
- Mixed by Demacio Castellón and Nelly Furtado
- Digital editing by Ron Taylor
- Guitars by Dan Turco
- Trumpets by Brownman Ali
- Recorded at The Hit Factory Criteria, Miami, Florida

== Release history ==
Region	Date	Format	Label
Canada	January 1, 2009	Digital download	Nelstar
Mexico	January 1, 2009	Digital download	Nelstar
United States	May 4, 2010	Radio premiere	Nelstar
Italy	June 15, 2010	Digital download	Nelstar
