= Mi Plan =

Studio album by Nelly Furtado
- Released: September 11, 2009
- Recorded: 2008–2009
- Studios: Cubejam (Miami, Florida); The Hit Factory (Miami, Florida); Orange Studios (Toronto, Ontario); Rumblecone Studios (Toronto, Ontario); Westlake Audio (Los Angeles, California)
- Genres: Latin pop; pop rock
- Length: 44:42
- Language: Spanish
- Label: Nelstar
- Producers: Demacio Castellon; James Bryan; Nelly Furtado; Michael Anthony Turco; Lester Mendez; Salaam Remi; Julieta Venegas; Brian West

Nelly Furtado chronology
Loose: The Concert (2007)	Mi Plan (2009)	Mi Plan Remixes (2010)

Singles from Mi Plan
- 1. "Manos al Aire" Released: June 26, 2009; 2. "Más" Released: December 18, 2009; 3. "Bajo Otra Luz" Released: May 4, 2010

Mi Plan (English: My Plan) is the fourth studio album and the first Spanish-language album by Canadian singer-songwriter Nelly Furtado. It was released independently on September 11, 2009, by Furtado's own record label Nelstar Entertainment with distribution by Universal Music Latino. This marks Furtado's first independently released album. Recording sessions for the album took place from 2008 to 2009. The album was produced primarily by Furtado with other contributions made by James Bryan, Lester Mendez, Salaam Remi, The Demolition Crew, Julieta Venegas and Brian West. Furtado described the songs on the album to be "simple love songs".

Mi Plan was generally well received by music critics, most applauding Furtado's vocals. The album reached number one on the US Latin Billboard chart, and was later certified platinum (Latin field) album by the Recording Industry Association of America (RIAA). The album won a Latin Grammy Award for Best Female Pop Vocal Album in 2010. The lead single from the album, "Manos al Aire" was released in June 2009. The song became Furtado's first solo number one single on the US Billboard Top Latin Songs chart. She also became the first North American artist to top the chart with an original Spanish song. Two further singles came from the album, "Más", released in December 2009, and "Bajo Otra Luz", released in June 2010. The album was further supported by her 2010 Mi Plan Tour, her first tour reaching Latin America. Mi Plan Remixes, a remix album, followed in October 2010, featuring remixes of the singles.

== Background ==
Furtado began working with guitarist and producer James Bryan on My Plan, as a possible English-language album. She said she would try to write songs in English and then in Portuguese but that she did not feel inspired. She mentioned that fellow Canadian singer-songwriter Alex Cuba suggested that they try writing the lyrics in Spanish and then he would go on to write the melodies. After approving of the idea, she said that she, Cuba and Bryan started "really organically writing songs" in Spanish. Cuba then helped them pen more songs, including the title track, "Mi Plan", and "Manos al Aire". "Mi Plan" features Cuba on vocals. According to Cuba, the three got together five times between September 2008 and February 2009 and wrote nine songs, six of which made it onto the album. Furtado also worked with Julieta Venegas, who wrote the song "Bajo Otra Luz" and also contributed to another song called "Vacación", playing the accordion. Altogether, Furtado wrote 24 Spanish-language songs, 12 of which made the final track list.

== Content ==
In an interview with the Associated Press, Furtado said that the album was a personal statement and that the central theme was love. She noted that her previous albums had songs that "explored certain aspects of love, but they're not really direct love songs" and that the songs on Mi Plan were more simple. She also claimed that she "wanted to abandon the dance-pop vibe of her last record and try a different sound". Furtado explained that she decided she wanted to perform in Spanish because she did not follow commercial or sales trends and that the album was "the next phase".

She said that writing songs in Spanish felt "very liberating", allowing her to "express other emotions" because, as she put it, "In English, especially as a woman, the moment you start to be angry, you get labelled bad-tempered like Alanis Morissette, or if you're too sad, you get written off as fragile and sappy."

The album contains influences of Latin jazz, flamenco pop, techno-pop, reggae pop, cumbia, electro, bachata pop, and alternative rock.

The opening track, "Manos al Aire", is an uptempo dance-influenced song about having a "heated argument" with a love interest; Furtado noted that in the chorus, she puts up the "white flag" and "surrenders" to him. "Bajo Otra Luz" is about being in a relationship where you feel like "something is glowing on you and there is something different about the world." The seventh track, "Suficiente Tiempo", describes the busy life of an overworked wife trying to make time for a date night.

Furtado stated that the album was "purposefully collaboration-heavy" because she wanted it to sound like a "community effort" with "all those layers of experience." She collaborated with Josh Groban on "Silencio", calling it a "huge blessing" and noting it was important to feature an artist known for English recordings to demonstrate that "language isn't a barrier when it comes to music."

== Promotion ==
Prior to the album's release, three promotional singles were released exclusively on Apple's iTunes Store as a "Countdown to Mi Plan". "Más" was the first promotional single released on July 21, 2009. The following month, "Mi Plan" was released, followed by "Bajo Otra Luz" in early September. "Silencio" was digitally released as a promotional single in the US via Rhapsody on September 1, 2009.

On October 26, 2010, a 12-track album titled Mi Plan Remixes was released, featuring various remixes of the album's singles. An English version of "Fuerte" was released as a promotional single from both Mi Plan and the remix album on the same day. Furtado also appeared at various award shows and venues to promote the record, including a performance at the 2009 ALMA Awards. At the Latin Grammy Awards of 2010, she performed a medley of "Fuerte" and "Bajo Otra Luz" alongside La Mala Rodríguez and Jabbawockeez.

== Critical reception ==
Professional ratings
Aggregate scores
Source	Rating
Metacritic	71/100
Review scores
Source	Rating
AllMusic	3.5/5 stars
Billboard	4.5/5 stars
Digital Spy	3/5 stars
Entertainment Weekly	C
MusicOMH	2.5/5 stars
Slant	2/5 stars
Yahoo! Music UK	6/10 stars

The album was generally well received by critics: it scored 71/100 among professional music critics cited by Metacritic. In a positive review, Stephen Thomas Erlewine of AllMusic wrote that the album is "assured and cohesive" and claimed that it is her "strongest album yet". Billboard described the album as "straightforward songs that appeal to melodic sensibilities rather than rhythmic contraptions, the set is a mix of vulnerability and earnestness". The Boston Globe said "Furtado bridges pop sensibilities with Latin music" and also mentioned the songs, "Sueños" and "Silencio", saying that they "bring out the purity in Furtado's vocals". The New York Times editor Jon Pareles found that "Furtado’s own sensibility is never eclipsed. The music uses all the technology it wants; programmed beats carry most of the arrangements, while Ms. Furtado often overdubs herself as a backup girl group. And the songs stay bright, friendly and generalized yet heartfelt, awaiting the singalongs they invite in Ms. Furtado's latest language."

Digital Spy writer, Mayor Nissim, asserted that "aside from the vocals and lyrics, much of the music here wouldn't sound out of place in the UK or US charts, which is both a good and bad thing." He also went on to say that "the fact Manos and several other songs feature rather Americanised production can prevent them from completely hitting the mark" because, as he put it, "Furtado's tunes don't always get the Spanish wallop her vocals deserve." MusicOMH said in its review that "For the most part, the album is a pretty good listen" and claimed that songs from the album are "pleasant but never overly diverting". Paul Lester, a writer for BBC, gave the album a mixed review and said the music is "equally inoffensive". The writer compared it to her previous release, Loose and claimed that "Timbaland's inventive approach to dance motion is much missed". Entertainment Weekly also stated, "Without the Midas touch of studio magician Timbaland, Furtado has only her nasal, pleasant-enough vocals and a distinctly middlebrow musicality." Kevin Liedel of Slant Magazine was very critical, writing, "[it] manifests itself here in a labored and predictable fashion" and also said it is "heartless, with forced sincerity".

== Commercial performance ==
Mi Plan debuted at number 39 on the Billboard 200, including number 1 on the Top Latin Albums and Latin Pop Albums charts selling nearly 13,000 copies in its first week. On November 6, 2009, the album received a platinum certification (Latin field) by the Recording Industry Association of America (RIAA) for selling over 100,000 copies. According to Nielson SoundScan, the album was the highest selling Latin pop album in 2009.

In Switzerland, Mi Plan entered the charts at number three and stayed in the top ten for five weeks. There, the album was certified gold for shipping over 15,000 units.

At the 11th Annual Latin Grammy Awards, Furtado won the Latin Grammy Award for Best Female Pop Vocal Album.

== Track listing ==
Mi Plan – Standard edition
No.	Title	Writer(s)	Producer(s)	Length
1.	"Manos al Aire"	Nelly Furtado; James Bryan; Alex Cuba	Bryan; Furtado; Demacio "Demo" Castellon^{[a]}	3:29
2.	"Más"	Furtado; Lester Mendez; Andres Recio	Mendez	3:32
3.	"Mi Plan" (featuring Alex Cuba)	Furtado; Bryan; Cuba	Bryan; Furtado; Castellon^{[b]}	4:05
4.	"Sueños" (featuring Alejandro Fernández)	Furtado; Bryan; Cuba	Bryan; Brian West; Furtado	3:11
5.	"Bajo Otra Luz" (featuring Julieta Venegas and La Mala Rodríguez)	Venegas; Rodríguez	Castellon; Venegas; Furtado	4:19
6.	"Vacación"	Furtado; Mendez; Venegas	Mendez	3:43
7.	"Suficiente Tiempo"	Furtado; Cuba	Salaamremi.com	3:03
8.	"Fuerte" (featuring Concha Buika)	Furtado; Bryan; Cuba	Salaamremi.com	3:25
9.	"Silencio" (featuring Josh Groban)	Furtado; Mendez; Julio Reyes Copello	Mendez	3:34
10.	"Como Lluvia" (featuring Juan Luis Guerra)	Furtado; Mendez; Guerra	Mendez	3:37
11.	"Feliz Cumpleaños"	Furtado; Bryan; Cuba	Castellon; Furtado	4:11
12.	"Fantasmas" (hidden track)	Furtado; Cuba	Castellon; Furtado; Michael Anthony^{[a]}	3:33
Total length:				44:42

Mi Plan – iTunes Store edition (bonus track)
No.	Title	Writer(s)	Producer(s)	Length
13.	"Manos al Aire" (Humby Remix)	Furtado; Bryan; Cuba	Bryan; Furtado; Castellon^{[a]}	3:39

Notes

- ^{^a} signifies a co-producer.
- ^{^b} signifies an additional producer.

== Personnel ==
Credits below are adapted from the Mi Plan liner notes.

=== Production ===
- Andrés Recio – executive producer, A&R
- Nelly Furtado – executive producer, producer, mixing
- Chris Smith – executive producer
- James Bryan – producer, guitar, drums, keyboards, engineer
- Julieta Venegas – producer, accordion
- Lester Méndez – producer, percussion, guitar, keyboards, mixing, engineer, string arrangements
- Brian West – producer
- The Demolition Crew – producer
- Salaam Remi – producer, drums, keyboards
- Vanessa Freebairn-Smith, Alex Grant – cello
- Alex Grant – cello
- Daniel Stone, Raphael Padilla, Roger Travassos – percussion
- Dan Warner – guitar, bass guitar
- Dan Turco, Vincent Henry – guitar
- StayBent Krunk-a-Delic – guitar, keyboards
- Ramón Stagnaro – guitar, cuatro
- Matt Scannell – guitar, bass guitar
- Michael Anthony Turco – producer, drums
- Lee Levin – drums
- Julio Hernandez, Alex Cuba – bass guitar
- Chris Gehringer – general mastering
- Demacio Castellón – mixing
- Franklin Emmanuel Socorro – mixing, engineer
- Jason "Metal" Donkersgoed – mixing, engineer
- Joel Numa – mixing, engineer
- Ron Taylor – digital editing
- Jorge Vivo – engineer
- Antonio Resendiz – engineer
- Julian Vazquez – engineer
- Allan Leschhorn – engineer
- Ryan Evans – engineer
- Enrique Larreal – engineer
- Carlos Alvarez – engineer
- Aureo Baqueiro – vocal producer
- Marc Rogers – double bass
- Javier Limón – flamenco guitar
- Tyler Armes – piano
- Nick Banns – string arrangements
- Sonus Quartet – strings
- Mark Lidell – cover photo
- Joachim Johnson – photography

=== Guest appearances ===
- Alex Cuba appears courtesy of Caracol Records
- Alejandro Fernández appears courtesy of Universal Music Latino
- Julieta Venegas appears courtesy of Sony Music
- La Mala Rodríguez appears courtesy of Universal Music Spain
- Concha Buika appears courtesy of Warner Bros. and casalimon.tv
- Javier Limón appears courtesy of casalimon.tv
- Josh Groban appears courtesy of Warner Bros. Records
- Juan Luis Guerra appears courtesy of EMI Televisa Music

== Charts ==
=== Weekly charts ===
Weekly chart performance for Mi Plan
Chart (2009)	Peak position
Austrian Albums (Ö3 Austria)	6
Belgian Albums (Ultratop Flanders)	27
Belgian Albums (Ultratop Wallonia)	28
Canadian Albums (Billboard)	20
Czech Albums (ČNS IFPI)	5
Dutch Albums (MegaCharts)	30
European Top 100 Albums (Billboard)	6
French Albums (SNEP)	41
German Albums (Offizielle Top 100)	5
Hungarian Albums (MAHASZ)	31
Italian Albums (FIMI)	10
Mexican Albums (AMPROFON)	11
Polish Albums (OLiS)	6
Spanish Albums (PROMUSICAE)	8
Swiss Albums (Schweizer Hitparade)	3
US Billboard 200	39
US Latin Pop Albums (Billboard)	1
US Top Latin Albums (Billboard)	1

=== Year-end charts ===
Year-end chart performance for Mi Plan
Chart (2009)	Position
German Albums (Offizielle Top 100)	82
Polish Albums (OLiS)	91
Swiss Albums (Schweizer Hitparade)	54
US Top Latin Albums (Billboard)	46
US Latin Pop Albums (Billboard)	14

== Certifications ==
Certifications for Mi Plan
Region	Certification	Certified units/sales
Germany (BVMI)	Gold	100,000^{^}
Poland (ZPAV)	Gold	10,000^{*}
Switzerland (IFPI Switzerland)	Gold	15,000^{^}
United States (RIAA)	Platinum (Latin)	100,000^{^}
^{*} Sales figures based on certification alone.^{^} Shipments figures based on certification alone.

== Release history ==
Release history for Mi Plan
Region	Date	Label	Ref.
Austria	September 11, 2009	Universal Music	
Germany	September 11, 2009	Universal Music	
Switzerland	September 11, 2009	Universal Music	
United Kingdom	September 14, 2009	Polydor	
Canada	September 15, 2009	Universal Music	
Mexico	September 15, 2009	Nelstar; Universal Music Latin	
United States	September 15, 2009	Nelstar; Universal Music Latin	
Brazil	September 17, 2009	Universal Music	
France	October 5, 2009	Universal Music	

== See also ==
- List of number-one Billboard Top Latin Albums of 2009
- List of number-one Billboard Latin Pop Albums from the 2000s
