= Manos al Aire =

2009 single by Nelly Furtado

Single by Nelly Furtado

from the album Mi Plan
- Language: Spanish
- Released: June 26, 2009
- Recorded: 2008
- Studio: Rumblecone, The Orange Lounge; Toronto, Ontario, Canada
- Genre: Latin pop; pop rock
- Length: 3:29
- Label: Nelstar
- Songwriters: Nelly Furtado; Alex Cuba; James Bryan
- Producers: Nelly Furtado; James Bryan

Nelly Furtado singles chronology
"Broken Strings" (2008)	"Manos al Aire" (2009)	"Jump" (2009)

Music video
- "Manos Al Aire" on YouTube

"Manos al Aire" (pronounced [ˈmanos al ˈajɾe]; transl. "Hands Up" or "I Surrender", lit. "Hands in the Air") is a Spanish-language song by Canadian singer-songwriter Nelly Furtado. Written by Furtado, Alex Cuba and James Bryan, it was produced by Furtado and Bryan for the former's fourth studio album, Mi Plan (2009). Furtado explained the song is about "surrendering to love, and vulnerability." She felt that the song could only be sung in Spanish because it would be a "train wreck" if it were sung in English, due to the complexity of the lyrics.

It was released by Nelstar Entertainment and Universal Music Latino as the first single to worldwide radio on June 29, 2009. "Manos al Aire" reached number-one on the US Billboard Latin Songs chart, becoming Furtado's first number-one song on the chart as a lead artist. Furtado also became the first North American act to have an originally written Spanish song to reach number-one on the chart. It peaked at number two in Germany, Czech Republic and Italy. It also peaked within the top 10 in Austria, Hungary, Switzerland and Spain. The music video of the song was filmed in Toronto and it portrayed Furtado as an angry lover who, during the video, throws away personal belongings and items, and removing articles of clothing which symbolizes her letting her guard down and surrendering to love. The song won a BMI Award in 2011.

== Background and writing ==
"Manos al Aire" was co-written by Nelly Furtado, James Bryan and Alex Cuba, and produced by Furtado and Bryan. It is a Latin pop song with "a slice of pop/rock with twangy guitars, tight drums and terrific breathy vocals" and has acoustic and dance influences The song's title translates to "Hands in the Air" or "I Surrender". Furtado told MTV that the song is about "surrendering to love, and vulnerability ... and it talks about the dynamic of a relationship and the everyday fight to be a couple". Furtado felt that the emotions that the lyrics portray could only be expressed in Spanish because, as she put it: "There's a complexity going on there that would be a bit of a train-wreck in English." In an interview with Mayor Nissim, of Digital Spy, she further explained the conception of the song. She said that the song's protagonist feels angry but during the chorus says, as she put it, "My hands are in the air, let's work this out". Furtado also felt that if the song was performed in English, she would be labelled "furious or sappy" because of the content. It was recorded by Bryan at the Rumblecone Studios and The Orange Lounge in Toronto, Ontario, Canada, and mixed by Demacio "Demo" Castellón.

== Critical reception ==
Mayer Nissim of Digital Spy said: "the fact that 'Manos' and several other songs feature rather Americanised production can prevent them from completely hitting the mark - sad to say, but Furtado's tunes don't always get the Spanish wallop her vocals deserve." Leila Cobo stated that the song "doesn't set the tone for the album, which balances intimacy with commercial appeal."

Michael Cragg, of musicOMH, called the song "a catchy blend of rock guitars and pattering beats". He also wrote that the chorus-line is "one of the few that genuinely stick in the mind".

== Chart performance ==
The single was well received in the United States. During its third week on the Billboard Hot Latin Songs chart, it ascended from number 30 to number 13. After two weeks at number two, "Manos al Aire" replaced Shakira's "Loba" at number-one the Billboard Latin Songs chart, during the week dated September 12, 2009. It became Furtado's first number one song as a lead artist, and her second since Juanes' "Fotografía" topped the chart in 2002. Shakira's "Loba" had regained its place at number-one, ending the song's four week stint at the top spot.

In Italy, "Manos al Aire" debuted at number two and remained at the spot for two consecutive weeks. After it fluctuated down the chart, it climbed up back into the top 10 and remained for four weeks until it left the chart three weeks later. The song peaked at number nine for two consecutive weeks, after spending 10 weeks on the chart in Spain.

== Music video ==
The music video for "Manos al Aire" was filmed in June 2009 in Toronto and premiered on July 29, 2009. It was released to Apple's iTunes Store on August 3, 2009. In the beginning of the video, Furtado is shown driving an army jeep and sporting army gear, all of which she said represents her character's strong ego. As the video progresses, Furtado is shown throwing items and personal belongings out of the Army truck. These belongings are symbolized as her "emotional" weapons. In another scene, Furtado departs from the truck, and begins walking down a street. She also begins shedding her army gear and getting rid of her purse and other articles of clothing, all of which symbolizes letting her guard and defenses down. As the video comes to a conclusion, Furtado, who is vulnerable, shows up to her boyfriend's frontdoor, who greets her with the same defenseless attitude. Per Furtado's request, the video features English subtitles for viewers. The lyrics in the English subtitles for the video are not literal translations, they are an English interpretation of the song, which Furtado herself had written.

== Track listing ==
German 2-track single

1. "Manos al Aire" — 3:28
2. "Manos al Aire" (Robbie Rivera Radio Mix) — 3:35

German 4-track single

1. "Manos al Aire" — 3:28
2. "Manos al Aire" (Robbie Rivera Radio Mix) — 3:35
3. "Manos al Aire" (Robbie Rivera Juicy Mix) — 7:07
4. "Manos al Aire" (Robbie Rivera Radio Mix Instrumental) — 3:33

== Personnel ==
Credits are adapted from the Mi Plan liner notes.

- Nelly Furtado – producer
- James Bryan – producer, recording engineer, drum programming, guitars, keyboards
- Demacio "Demo" Castellón – mixing
- Dan Warner – additional guitar, bass
- The Demolition Crew – co-producer
- Michael Anthony – additional drum programming
- Nick Banns – string arrangements
- Daniel Stone – percussion
- Jason "Metal" Donkersgoed – assistant mixing
- Ron Taylor – digital editing
- Chris Gerhinger – mastering

== Charts ==
=== Weekly charts ===
Weekly chart performance for "Manos al Aire"
Chart (2009–2010)	Peak position
Austria (Ö3 Austria Top 40)	5
Belgium (Ultratip Bubbling Under Flanders)	5
Belgium (Ultratop 50 Wallonia)	20
Czech Republic Airplay (ČNS IFPI)	1
Europe (European Hot 100 Singles)	8
France (SNEP)	20
Germany (GfK)	2
Hungary (Rádiós Top 40)	8
Italy (FIMI)	2
Mexico (Billboard Mexican Airplay)	9
Netherlands (Dutch Top 40 Tipparade)	8
Netherlands (Single Top 100)	92
Slovakia Airplay (ČNS IFPI)	2
Spain (Promusicae)	9
Spanish Airplay Chart	1
Switzerland (Schweizer Hitparade)	6
US Bubbling Under Hot 100 (Billboard)	4
US Dance Club Songs (Billboard)	26
US Hot Latin Songs (Billboard)	1

=== Year-end charts ===
2009 year-end chart performance for "Manos al Aire"
Chart (2009)	Position
Austria (Ö3 Austria Top 40)	44
Europe (Eurochart Hot 100)	62
Germany (Media Control GfK)	36
Hungary (Rádiós Top 40)	56
Italy (FIMI)	24
Spain (PROMUSICAE)	43
Switzerland (Schweizer Hitparade)	51
US Hot Latin Songs (Billboard)	15

== Certifications ==
Certifications and sales "Manos al Aire"
Region	Certification	Certified units/sales
Mexico (AMPROFON)	Gold	30,000^{‡}
Spain (Promusicae)	Gold	20,000^{*}
^{*} Sales figures based on certification alone.^{‡} Sales+streaming figures based on certification alone.

== Radio and release dates ==
List of radio and release dates with formats and record labels
Region	Date	Format	Label
United Kingdom	June 26, 2009	Digital download	Universal Music Latino
Worldwide	June 29, 2009	Official radio premier	Universal Music Latino
Belgium	June 29, 2009	Digital download	Universal Music
France	June 29, 2009	Digital download	Universal Music
Portugal	June 29, 2009	Digital download	Universal Music
Switzerland	June 29, 2009	Digital download	Universal Music
Spain	June 30, 2009	Digital download	Universal Music
Italy	July 10, 2009	Digital download	Universal Music
Austria	July 31, 2009	Digital download, maxi-single	Universal Music
Germany	July 31, 2009	CD single	Universal Music
Belgium	August 25, 2009	Remixes EP	Universal Music Latino
Canada	September 8, 2009	Remixes EP	Universal Music Latino
United States	September 8, 2009	Remixes EP	Universal Music Latino
United Kingdom	September 10, 2009	Remixes EP	Universal Music Latino
Portugal	September 14, 2009	Remixes EP	Universal Music Latino

== See also ==
- List of number-one Billboard Hot Latin Songs of 2009
- List of Billboard Latin Rhythm Airplay number ones of 2009
