= The Spirit Indestructible Tour =

2013 concert tour by Nelly Furtado

- Tour by Nelly Furtado
- Associated album: The Spirit Indestructible
- Start date: January 8, 2013
- End date: March 15, 2013
- Legs: 2
- No. of shows: 15 in North America; 10 in Europe; 25 total

Nelly Furtado concert chronology
- Mi Plan Tour (2010); The Spirit Indestructible Tour (2013); Summer Tour (2017)

The Spirit Indestructible Tour was the fifth concert tour by Canadian singer-songwriter Nelly Furtado, in support of her fifth studio album, The Spirit Indestructible (2012).

== Background ==
The tour was announced on November 13, 2012, via Furtado's official website. The tour suffered from low ticket sales, several shows were cancelled and several shows had to be moved to smaller venues. In place of the cancelled shows, smaller shows were announced for Burlington and Belleville. Only 2,353 people were in attendance opening night in Victoria. The opening act was Dylan Murray, an artist from Furtado's label Nelstar Records. Murray also did duet live with Furtado on the track "Be OK".

Ahead of the tour's debut in Furtado's hometown of Victoria, local radio station Ocean 98.5 held a contest offering tickets to the first show. The Huffington Post Canada held contests for free tickets throughout the tour's Canadian dates. Mississauga News held a contest for free tickets to the Toronto show.

== Critical reception ==
Mike Devlin of the Times Colonist reviewed the first date of the tour and gave the show three stars out of five. Devlin wrote, "A mid-set run that included a faithful but lovely 'I’m Like a Bird' and an empowered 'Força', during which she played ukulele, reminded fans why she became so famous in the first place. But few songs on this night could match the splendour of her most moving ballad, 'Try', during which her voice was nothing short of spectacular. “All I know,” she sang during the song, “is everything is not as it’s sold.” That much is true — about life, and about Furtado, too. Think she’s simply a pop star? Think again." The Vancouver Sun gave the following concert a mixed review, writing that the concert "opened on an uplifting, hopeful note" but that the "rest of the concert was laborious". Marsha Lederman of The Globe and Mail was equally mixed, stating that "[Furtado] still has the vocal chops and stage presence, but the show was uneven".

== Opening acts ==
- Dylan Murray (North America)
- Jessica Tyler (North America)
- Celia Palli (Europe)

== Setlist ==
The following setlist is obtained from the concert held on January 24, 2013, at the Sony Centre for the Performing Arts in Toronto, Canada. It does not represent all songs performed on tour.

1. "Spirit Indestructible"
2. "Waiting for the Night"
3. "Say It Right"
4. "Do It"
5. "Powerless (Say What You Want)"
6. "Try"
7. "Don’t Leave This Love" (performed with Dylan Murray)
8. "Quando, Quando, Quando"
9. "Get Ur Freak On" / "Turn Off the Light"
10. "I'm Like a Bird"
11. "Fly Like an Eagle"
12. "Força"
13. "All Good Things (Come to an End)"
14. "Bucket List"
15. "Parking Lot"
16. "Big Hoops (Bigger the Better)"
17. "High Life"
18. "Give It to Me" / "Promiscuous"

Encore

19. "Miracles"
20. "Like a Prayer"
21. "Maneater"

== Tour dates ==
Date	City	Country	Venue
North America
January 8, 2013	Victoria	Canada	Save-On-Foods Memorial Centre
January 9, 2013	Vancouver	Canada	Commodore Ballroom
January 11, 2013	Kamloops	Canada	Interior Savings Centre
January 12, 2013	Calgary	Canada	Southern Alberta Jubilee Auditorium
January 14, 2013	Medicine Hat	Canada	Esplanade Theatre
January 15, 2013	Edmonton	Canada	Northern Alberta Jubilee Auditorium
January 17, 2013	Saskatoon	Canada	Odeon Events Centre
January 19, 2013	Thunder Bay	Canada	Thunder Bay Community Auditorium
January 21, 2013	Belleville	Canada	Empire Theatre
January 23, 2013^{[A]}	Toronto	Canada	Air Canada Centre
January 24, 2013	Toronto	Canada	Sony Centre for the Performing Arts
January 26, 2013	Windsor	Canada	The Colosseum at Caesars Windsor
January 28, 2013	Burlington	Canada	Burlington Performing Arts Centre
January 29, 2013	Kitchener	Canada	Centre In The Square
January 30, 2013	Montreal	Canada	Théâtre Saint-Denis
Europe
March 3, 2013	Berlin	Germany	Huxleys Neue Welt
March 5, 2013	Cologne	Germany	Theater am Tanzbrunnen
March 6, 2013	Hamburg	Germany	Große Freiheit 36
March 7, 2013	Munich	Germany	Kesselhaus
March 8, 2013	Vienna	Austria	Bank Austria Halle
March 10, 2013	Zürich	Switzerland	Volkshaus
March 11, 2013	Neu-Isenburg	Germany	Hugenottenhalle
March 13, 2013	Milan	Italy	Discoteca Alcatraz
March 14, 2013	Ljubljana	Slovenia	Dvorana Tivoli
March 15, 2013^{[B]}	Crans-Montana	Switzerland	Plans-Mayen

Festivals and other miscellaneous performances
^{A} This concert was a private show for the sponsorship between Canadian Tire and Canadian Olympic committee.
^{B} Caprices Festival Crans-Montana

Cancellations and rescheduled shows

January 9, 2013	Vancouver, Canada	Orpheum Theatre	Moved to Commodore Ballroom
January 18, 2013	Winnipeg, Canada	MTS Centre Theatre	Cancelled
January 21, 2013	Ottawa, Canada	Southam Hall	Cancelled
January 28, 2013	Hamilton, Canada	Hamilton Place Theatre	Cancelled

=== Box office score data ===
Venue	City	Tickets Sold / Available	Gross Revenue
Théâtre Saint-Denis	Montreal	597 / 750 (80%)	$38,147
