= List of awards and nominations received by Nelly Furtado =

Nelly Furtado awards and nominations
Awards and nominations
Award	Wins	Nominations
American Music Awards	0	2
ASCAP Pop Music Awards	5	5
Billboard Latin Music Awards	2	7
Billboard Music Awards	1	4
BMI Latin Awards	1	1
Brit Awards	1	3
Canada's Walk of Fame	1	1
Grammy Awards	1	7
Juno Awards	10	21
Latin Grammy Awards	1	1
Los 40 Music Awards	1	5
MTV Europe Music Awards	1	9
MTV Video Music Awards	0	5
Much Music Video Awards	7	22
People's Choice Awards	1	2
Teen Choice Awards	3	6
World Music Awards	2	3

Totals (Note: Certain award groups do not simply award one winner. They acknowledge several different recipients, have runners-up, and have third place. Since this is a specific recognition and is different from losing an award, runner-up mentions are considered wins in this award tally. For simplification and to avoid errors, each award in this list has been presumed to have had a prior nomination.)
- Wins: 107
- Nominations: 246

This is a comprehensive list of awards and nominations won by Nelly Furtado, a Canadian singer. Since beginning her career, Furtado has received 107 awards and 246 nominations.

Furtado's first single, "I'm like a Bird", from her debut album Whoa, Nelly!, earned her the Best Female Pop Vocal Performance at the 2002 Grammy Awards, a Juno award, and Best Pop New Artist Clip at the Billboard Music Video Awards.

Her second album, Folklore (2003), wasn't successful saleswise, but it still earned her a Juno award and 5 other nominations.

Loose, the third album, was the most successful album of her career. She won a Best International Female Solo Artist at the 2007 BRIT Awards, a Best Pop Collaboration with Vocals nomination at the 2007 Grammy Awards, and an Album of the Year award at the MTV Europe Music Awards.

== Awards and nominations ==
Award	Year	Nominee(s)	Category	Result	Ref.
APRA Music Awards	2002	"I'm Like a Bird"	Most Performed Foreign Work	Nominated	
ASCAP Pop Music Awards	2002	"I'm Like a Bird"	Most Performed Songs	Won	
ASCAP Pop Music Awards	2003	"Turn Off the Light"	Most Performed Songs	Won	
ASCAP Pop Music Awards	2007	"Promiscuous"	Most Performed Songs	Won	
ASCAP Pop Music Awards	2008	"Give It to Me"	Most Performed Songs	Won	
ASCAP Pop Music Awards	2008	"Say It Right"	Most Performed Songs	Won	
Anděl Awards	2008	Loose	Best Selling Foreign Album	Won	
Apelzin Awards	2007	"Say It Right"	Best Track	Nominated	
Apelzin Awards	2007	"All Good Things"	Best Video	Won	
Artists for Peace and Justice	2023	Herself	Artists for Peace and Justice Award	Won	
BDSCertified Spin Awards	2004	"I'm Like a Bird"	400,000 Spins	Won	
BDSCertified Spin Awards	2004	"Powerless"	50,000 Spins	Won	
BDSCertified Spin Awards	2006	"Promiscuous"	300,000 Spins	Won	
BDSCertified Spin Awards	2007	"Say It Right"	100,000 Spins	Won	
BDSCertified Spin Awards	2007	"Say It Right"	200,000 Spins	Won	
BDSCertified Spin Awards	2007	"Give It To Me"	50,000 Spins	Won	
BDSCertified Spin Awards	2007	"Say It Right"	400,000 Spins	Won	
BMI Latin Awards	2011	"Manos al Aire"	Award-Winning Song	Won	
Billboard Latin Music Awards	2004	"Fotografía"	Hot Latin Track of the Year	Nominated	
Billboard Latin Music Awards	2004	"Fotografía"	Hot Latin Track of the Year, Vocal Duet	Won	
Billboard Latin Music Awards	2004	"Fotografía"	Latin Pop Airplay Track of the Year, Duo or Group	Won	
Billboard Latin Music Awards	2010	Herself	Hot Latin Songs Artist of the Year, Female	Nominated	
Billboard Latin Music Awards	2010	Herself	Latin Pop Airplay Artist of the Year, Female	Nominated	
Billboard Latin Music Awards	2010	Herself	Tropical Airplay Artist of the Year, Female	Nominated	
Billboard Latin Music Awards	2010	Mi Plan	Latin Digital Album of the Year	Nominated	
Billboard Music Awards	2006	"Promiscuous"	Top Hot 100 Song	Nominated	
Billboard Music Awards	2006	"Promiscuous"	Top Pop 100 Song	Won	
Billboard Music Awards	2006	"Promiscuous"	Top Pop 100 Airplay Track	Nominated	
Billboard Music Awards	2006	"Promiscuous"	Top Digital Song	Nominated	
Billboard Music Video Awards	2001	"I'm Like a Bird"	Best New Artist Pop Clip	Won	
Billboard Year-End	2007	Herself	Top Hot Dance Club Play Artist	Won	
Billboard Year-End	2007	Herself	Top Hot Dance Airplay Artist	Nominated	
Billboard Year-End	2007	"Say It Right"	Top Pop 100 Song	Nominated	
Billboard Year-End	2007	"Say It Right"	Top Pop 100 Airplay Track	Nominated	
Billboard Year-End	2007	"Say It Right"	Top Hot Dance Club Play Track	Nominated	
Billboard Year-End	2007	"Say It Right"	Top Hot Dance Airplay Track	Nominated	
Brit Awards	2002	Herself	International Breakthrough Act	Nominated	
Brit Awards	2002	Herself	International Female Solo Artist	Nominated	
Brit Awards	2007	Herself	International Female Solo Artist	Won	
Canadian Independent Music Awards	2004	"Breath"	Favorite Video	Nominated	
Canadian Music Awards Fan Choice	2001	Herself	Choice Canadian Female Artist	Won	
Canadian Music Awards Fan Choice	2002	Herself	Choice Canadian Female Artist	Won	
Canadian Music Awards Fan Choice	2002	"I'm Like a Bird"	Choice Canadian Song	Won	
Canadian Music Week	2016	Herself	Allan Slaight Humanitarian Spirit Award	Won	
Canadian Radio Music Awards	2001	Herself	Best New Pop/Adult Solo Artist	Won	
Canadian Radio Music Awards	2001	Herself	Top New Top 40 Solo Artist	Won	
Canadian Radio Music Awards	2008	Herself	Chart Topper Award	Won	
Canadian Screen Awards	2025	Juno Awards of 2024	Best Host, Live Entertainment Special	Won	
DIVA-Awards	2008	Herself	Deutscher Musikpreis	Won	
Danish Music Awards	2002	Herself	Foreign Newcomer of the Year	Nominated	
Echo Music Prize	2002	Herself	Best International Newcomer	Nominated	
Echo Music Prize	2005	Herself	Best International Female	Nominated	
Echo Music Prize	2007	Herself	Best International Female	Nominated	
Echo Music Prize	2007	"All Good Things"	Hit of the Year	Nominated	
Echo Music Prize	2008	"Say It Right"	Hit of the Year	Nominated	
Echo Music Prize	2008	Loose	Album of the Year	Nominated	
Echo Music Prize	2008	Herself	Best International Female	Won	
Electronic Dance Music Awards	2024	"Eat Your Man"	House Song Of The Year	Nominated	
Electronic Dance Music Awards	2024	"Eat Your Man"	Best Collaboration	Nominated	
Electronic Dance Music Awards	2026	"Faded"	Best Collaboration	Nominated	
Fryderyk	2006	Loose	Best Foreign Album	Nominated	
German Sustainability Awards	2014	Herself	German Sustainability Award	Won	
Grammy Awards	2002	Herself	Best New Artist	Nominated	
Grammy Awards	2002	"I'm Like a Bird"	Song of the Year	Nominated	
Grammy Awards	2002	"I'm Like a Bird"	Best Female Pop Vocal Performance	Won	
Grammy Awards	2002	Whoa, Nelly!	Best Pop Vocal Album	Nominated	
Grammy Awards	2007	"Promiscuous"	Best Pop Collaboration with Vocals	Nominated	
Grammy Awards	2008	"Give It To Me"	Best Pop Collaboration with Vocals	Nominated	
Grammy Awards	2008	"Say It Right"	Best Female Pop Vocal Performance	Nominated	
Groovevolt Music & Fashion Awards	2007	"Promiscuous"	Song of the Year	Nominated	
Groovevolt Music & Fashion Awards	2007	"Promiscuous"	Best Collaboration, Duo or Group	Nominated	
Groovevolt Music & Fashion Awards	2007	Loose	Pop Album of the Year	Nominated	
Groovevolt Music & Fashion Awards	2007	"Afraid"	Best Deep Cut	Nominated	
Hungarian Music Awards	2007	Loose	Best Foreign Pop Album	Won	
IFPI Platinum Europe Awards	2001	Whoa, Nelly!	Award Level 1	Won	
IFPI Platinum Europe Awards	2006	Loose	Award Level 1	Won	
IFPI Platinum Europe Awards	2007	Loose	Award Level 2	Won	
IFPI Platinum Europe Awards	2007	Loose	Award Level 3	Won	
International Dance Music Awards	2007	"Promiscuous"	Best R&B/Urban Dance Track	Nominated	
International Dance Music Awards	2008	Herself	Best Dance Solo Artist	Nominated	
International Dance Music Awards	2008	"Say It Right"	Best Pop Dance Track	Won	
Juno Awards	2001	Herself	Best New Solo Artist	Won	
Juno Awards	2001	Herself	Songwriter of the Year	Won	
Juno Awards	2001	Herself	Producer of the Year	Won	
Juno Awards	2001	"I'm Like a Bird"	Single of the Year	Won	
Juno Awards	2001	Whoa, Nelly!	Pop Album of the Year	Nominated	
Juno Awards	2002	Whoa, Nelly!	Album of the Year	Nominated	
Juno Awards	2002	Herself	Artist of the Year	Nominated	
Juno Awards	2004	Herself	Artist of the Year	Nominated	
Juno Awards	2004	Herself	Songwriter of the Year	Nominated	
Juno Awards	2004	Folklore	Album of the Year	Nominated	
Juno Awards	2004	Folklore	Pop Album of the Year	Nominated	
Juno Awards	2004	"Powerless"	Single of the Year	Won	
Juno Awards	2005	Herself	Producer of the Year	Nominated	
Juno Awards	2007	Herself	Artist of the Year	Won	
Juno Awards	2007	Herself	Fan Choice Award	Won	
Juno Awards	2007	Loose	Album of the Year	Won	
Juno Awards	2007	Loose	Pop Album of the Year	Won	
Juno Awards	2007	"Promiscuous"	Single of the Year	Won	
Juno Awards	2008	Herself	Fan Choice Award	Nominated	
Juno Awards	2013	The Spirit Indestructible	Pop Album of the Year	Nominated	
Juno Awards	2024	"Eat Your Man"	Dance Recording of the Year	Nominated	
Juno Awards	2026	7	Pop Album of the Year	Nominated	
Juno Awards	2026	Herself	Canadian Music Hall of Fame	Inducted	
LOS40 Music Awards	2007	Herself	Best International Artist	Won	
LOS40 Music Awards	2007	"All Good Things"	Best International Song	Nominated	
LOS40 Music Awards	2009	"Broken Strings"	Best International Song	Nominated	
LOS40 Music Awards	2009	Herself	Best Latin Artist	Nominated	
LOS40 Music Awards	2009	"Manos al Aire"	Best Latin Song	Nominated	
Latin Grammy Awards	2010	Mi Plan	Best Female Pop Vocal Album	Won	
Lo Nuestro Awards	2004	Herself (with Juanes)	Pop Group or Duo of the Year	Nominated	
Lo Nuestro Awards	2004	"Fotografía"	Video of the Year	Won	
Lo Nuestro Awards	2010	Herself	Pop New Artist of the Year	Won	
Lo Nuestro Awards	2010	Herself	Pop Female Artist of the Year	Nominated	
Lo Nuestro Awards	2011	Herself	Pop Female Artist of the Year	Nominated	
Lunas del Auditorio	2007	Herself	Best Foreign Pop Artist	Nominated	
Lunas del Auditorio	2010	Herself	Best Foreign Pop Artist	Nominated	
MOBO Awards	2006	Herself	Best International Female	Nominated	
MTV Asia Awards	2002	Herself	Favorite Breakthrough Artist	Nominated	
MTV Italian Music Awards	2007	Herself	First Lady	Nominated	
MTV Italian Music Awards	2009	"Broken Strings"	Nokia Playlist Generation	Nominated	
MVPA Awards	2002	"Turn Off the Light"	Pop Video of the Year	Won	
MVPA Awards	2002	"What's Going On"	R&B Video of the Year	Won	
MVPA Awards	2005	"Try"	Best Hair	Nominated	
MuchMusic Video Awards	2001	"I'm Like a Bird"	International Video of the Year - Artist	Nominated	
MuchMusic Video Awards	2001	"I'm Like a Bird"	Peoples Choice: Favourite Canadian Video	Nominated	
MuchMusic Video Awards	2001	"I'm Like a Bird"	MuchMoreMusic Award	Won	
MuchMusic Video Awards	2001	"I'm Like a Bird"	People's Choice: Favourite Canadian Artist	Won	
MuchMusic Video Awards	2002	"Turn Off the Light"	People's Choice: Favourite Canadian Artist	Won	
MuchMusic Video Awards	2002	"Turn Off the Light"	MuchMoreMusic Award	Won	
MuchMusic Video Awards	2003	"Breath"	Video of the Year	Nominated	
MuchMusic Video Awards	2003	"Breath"	Best Independent Video	Nominated	
MuchMusic Video Awards	2003	"Breath"	MuchVIBE Best Rap Video	Won	
MuchMusic Video Awards	2004	"Powerless"	Video of the Year	Nominated	
MuchMusic Video Awards	2004	"Powerless"	People's Choice: Favourite Canadian Artist	Nominated	
MuchMusic Video Awards	2004	"Powerless"	MuchMoreMusic Award	Nominated	
MuchMusic Video Awards	2004	"Powerless"	Best Pop Video	Won	
MuchMusic Video Awards	2006	"Friendamine"	MuchVIBE Best Rap Video	Nominated	
MuchMusic Video Awards	2007	"Say It Right"	MuchMoreMusic Award	Nominated	
MuchMusic Video Awards	2007	"Say It Right"	People's Choice: Favourite Canadian Artist	Nominated	
MuchMusic Video Awards	2007	"Say It Right"	Peoples Choice: Favourite Canadian Video	Nominated	
MuchMusic Video Awards	2007	"All Good Things"	Peoples Choice: Favourite Canadian Video	Nominated	
MuchMusic Video Awards	2008	"Do It"	UR Fave: Artist	Nominated	
MuchMusic Video Awards	2010	"Wavin' Flag"	MuchMusic.com Most Watched Video	Won	
MuchMusic Video Awards	2012	"Big Hoops"	Director of the Year	Nominated	
MuchMusic Video Awards	2012	"Is Anybody Out There?"	MuchVIBE Hip-Hop Video of the Year	Nominated	
My VH1 Music Awards	2001	Herself	Welcome to the Big Time	Nominated	
My VH1 Music Awards	2001	"What's Going On"	There's No "I" in Team (Best Collaboration)	Won	
NRJ Music Awards	2008	Herself	International Female Artist of the Year	Nominated	
Napster Awards (Germany)	2006	Herself	Most-Played Artist	Won	
Portuguese Canadian Walk of Fame	2013	Herself	Inducted	Won	
Premios Juventud	2004	Herself (with Juanes)	Dynamic Duet	Won	
Premios Juventud	2008	"Sexy Movimiento"	La Combinación Perfecta	Nominated	
Premios Oye!	2002	Herself	English Breakthrough of the Year	Nominated	
Premios Oye!	2002	Herself	English Female Artist of the Year	Nominated	
Premios Oye!	2002	Whoa, Nelly!	English Album of the Year	Nominated	
Premios Oye!	2002	"Turn Off the Light"	English Song of the Year	Nominated	
RTHK International Pop Poll Awards	2006	"Quando, Quando, Quando"	Top Ten International Gold Songs	Nominated	
RTHK International Pop Poll Awards	2007	"Maneater"	Top Ten International Gold Songs	Nominated	
RTHK International Pop Poll Awards	2008	"Give It to Me"	Top Ten International Gold Songs	Nominated	
RTHK International Pop Poll Awards	2024	"Keep Going Up"	Top Ten International Gold Songs	Nominated	
RTHK International Pop Poll Awards	2024	Herself	Top Female Singer	Nominated	
Radio Regenbogen Awards	2017	Herself	Best International Artist	Won	
SOCAN Awards	2002	"I'm Like a Bird"	International Achievement	Won	
SOCAN Awards	2002	"I'm Like a Bird"	Pop/Rock Music	Won	
SOCAN Awards	2002	"Turn Off the Light"	Pop/Rock Music	Won	
SOCAN Awards	2003	"Turn Off the Light"	International Achievement	Won	
SOCAN Awards	2005	"Powerless"	Pop/Rock Music	Won	
SOCAN Awards	2005	"Try"	Pop/Rock Music	Won	
SOCAN Awards	2007	"Promiscuous"	Urban Music	Won	
SOCAN Awards	2007	"Promiscuous"	SOCAN Salutes	Won	
SOCAN Awards	2008	"Give It to Me"	SOCAN Salutes	Won	
SOCAN Awards	2008	"Say It Right"	SOCAN Salutes	Won	
SOCAN Awards	2008	"Say It Right"	Pop/Rock Music	Won	
SOCAN Awards	2008	"All Good Things"	Pop/Rock Music	Won	
Teen Choice Awards	2001	Herself	Choice Breakout Artist	Nominated	
Teen Choice Awards	2006	Herself	Choice V-Cast Artist	Won	
Teen Choice Awards	2006	"Promiscuous"	Choice R&B/Hip-Hop Track	Won	
Teen Choice Awards	2006	"Promiscuous"	Choice Summer Song	Won	
Teen Choice Awards	2007	Herself	Choice Female Artist	Nominated	
Teen Choice Awards	2007	"Give It to Me"	Choice Music Single	Nominated	
Urban Music Awards	2007	Herself	Artist of the Year	Nominated	
Virgin Media Music Awards	2006	Herself	Best Solo Artist	Nominated	
Virgin Media Music Awards	2006	Herself	Best Comeback	Nominated	
Virgin Media Music Awards	2006	"Promiscuous"	Best Single	Nominated	
Viva Comet Awards	2001	Herself	Best International Newcomer	Nominated	
Viva Comet Awards	2001	"I'm Like a Bird"	Best International Video	Nominated	
Viva Comet Awards	2004	"Try"	Best International Video	Nominated	
Western Canadian Music Awards	2003	"Breath"	Video of the Year	Won	
Western Canadian Music Awards	2007	Herself	International Achievement Award	Won	
Women's College Hospital Foundation	2026	Herself	Trailblazer	Honored	
Žebřík Music Awards	2006	Herself	Best International Female	Nominated	
Žebřík Music Awards	2006	Herself	Best International Discovery	Nominated	
Žebřík Music Awards	2007	Herself	Best International Discovery	Nominated	
Žebřík Music Awards	2007	Herself	Best International Female	Nominated	
Žebřík Music Awards	2007	Loose	Best International Album	Nominated	

== American Music Awards ==
Year	Nominated work	Award	Result
2002	Nelly Furtado	Favorite Pop/Rock New Artist	Nominated
2006	Nelly Furtado	Favorite Pop/Rock Female Artist	Nominated

== Belgian TMF Awards ==
Year	Award	Nominated	Result
2007	Best International Female Artist	Herself	Won

== Canada Walk of Fame ==
Year	Nominee / work	Award	Result
2010	Herself	Walk of Fame	Won

== Canadian Civil Liberties Association Awards ==
Year	Nominee / work	Award	Result
2013	Herself	Excellence in the Arts	Won

== Cyprus Music Awards ==
Year	Nominee / work	Award	Result
2012	Herself	Best Canadian Artist	Won
2012	Herself	Best Latin Artist	Nominated

== Danish Music Awards ==
Year	Nominee / work	Award	Result
2008	Say It Right	Foreign Hit of the Year	Nominated
2008	All Good Things (Come to an End)	Foreign Hit of the Year	Nominated

== Eska Awards ==
Year	Nominee / work	Award	Result
2013	Herself	Radio Eska Award	Won

== Festival de Viña del Mar ==
Year	Award	Nominated work	Result
2008	Antorcha de Plata	Nelly Furtado	Won
2008	Antorcha de Oro	Nelly Furtado	Won
2008	Gaviota de Plata	Nelly Furtado	Won

== MTV Australia Video Music Awards ==
Year	Award	Nominated	Result
2007	Best Female Video	Promiscuous	Nominated
2007	Sexiest Video	Maneater	Nominated

== MTV Europe Music Awards ==
Year	Nominated work	Award	Result
2001	Nelly Furtado	Best New Act	Nominated
2006	Nelly Furtado	Best Female	Nominated
2006	"Maneater"	Best Song	Nominated
2006	Loose	Best Album	Nominated
2007	Nelly Furtado	Best Solo Artist	Nominated
2007	"All Good Things (Come to an End)"	Most Addictive Track	Nominated
2007	Loose	Album of the Year	Won
2012	Nelly Furtado	Best World Stage Act	Nominated
2024	Herself	Best Canadian Act	Nominated

== MTV Video Music Awards ==
Year	Award	Nominated work	Result
2006	Best Pop Video	"Promiscuous"	Nominated
2006	Best Female Video	"Promiscuous"	Nominated
2006	Best Dance Video	"Promiscuous"	Nominated
2007	Female Artist of the Year	Nelly Furtado	Nominated
2012	Best Video with a Message	"Is Anybody Out There?" (K'naan featuring Nelly Furtado)	Nominated

== MTV VMA Awards Latinoamerica ==
Year	Award	Nominated work	Result
2002	Best International Newcomer	Nelly Furtado	Nominated
2002	Best International Pop Artist	Nelly Furtado	Nominated
2003	Best Video	Fotografia	Nominated
2004	Best International Pop Artist	Nelly Furtado	Nominated
2006	Best International Pop Artist	Nelly Furtado	Nominated
2009	Best Song	Manos Al Aire	Nominated
2009	Best Video	Manos Al Aire	Nominated

== Native American Music Awards ==
Year	Nominee / work	Award	Result
2013	Herself	Living Legend Award	Won

== NAACP Image Awards ==
Year	Nominee / work	Award	Result
2002	Herself	Outstanding New Artist	Nominated

== NRJ Music Awards ==
Year	Award	Nominated work	Result
2007	International Revelation of the Year	Nelly Furtado	Won
2007	International Song of the Year	"Maneater"	Nominated

== West Coast Music Awards ==
Year	Award	Nominated work	Result
2001	Producer of the Year	Whoa, Nelly!	Won
2001	Best Pop/Rock Release	Whoa, Nelly!	Won
2001	Best Major Distribution Release	Whoa, Nelly!	Won
2001	Female Artist of the Year	Nelly Furtado	Won

== People Choice Awards ==
Year	Award	Nominated	Result
2007	Best Hip-Hop Song	Promiscuous	Nominated
2008	Best Hip-Hop Song	Give It To Me	Won

== Q Awards ==
Year	Award	Nominated	Result
2001	Best Video	I'm Like Bird	Nominated

== Radio Music Awards ==
Year	Award	Nominated	Result
2001	Most Requested Song	Turn Off The Light	Won

== Swiss Music Awards ==
Year	Award	Nominated	Result
2008	Best International Album	Loose	Won
2008	Best International Song	Say It Right	Nominated

== The Record of the Year ==
Year	Award	Nominated	Result
2006	"Maneater"	Record of the Year	Nominated
2009	"Broken Strings" (with James Morrison)	Record of the Year	Nominated

== World Music Awards ==
Year	Award	Nominated	Result
2002	World's Best-selling New Artist	Herself	Nominated
2002	World's Best-selling Artist/Canada	Herself	Won
2006	World's Best-selling Pop/Rock Artist	Herself	Won
