= Waiting for the Night =

Single by Nelly Furtado

from the album The Spirit Indestructible
- B-side: "Big Hoops (Bigger the Better)"; "Parking Lot"
- Released: December 14, 2012
- Recorded: 2012
- Studio: 2nd Floor Studios (Fountain Valley, California)
- Genre: Electropop; dance-pop
- Length: 4:29
- Label: Interscope
- Songwriters: Nelly Furtado; Rodney Jerkins
- Producers: Rodney "Darkchild" Jerkins; Nelly Furtado

Nelly Furtado singles chronology
"Parking Lot" (2012)	"Waiting for the Night" (2012)	"Pipe Dreams" (2016)

Music video
- "Waiting for the Night" on YouTube

"Waiting for the Night" is a song recorded by Canadian recording artist Nelly Furtado. It was written by Furtado and co-written and produced by Rodney "Darkchild" Jerkins for her fifth studio album, The Spirit Indestructible. Lyrically, the song is about Furtado having a crush on a boy and was inspired by a diary she kept as a sixteen-year-old on a summer vacation on São Miguel Island, Portugal.

"Waiting for the Night" received generally favorable reviews. Music critics praised the song for being catchy and having a memorable chorus. Some even noted similarities to Jennifer Lopez's single "Waiting for Tonight". Upon release, the song charted in some European countries, such as Austria, Germany and Switzerland. Furtado promoted the song on NRJ Stars for Free and on The Voice of Germany. A music video for the song was released on January 8, 2013. It features Furtado in half-face makeup, doing sultry noirish swaying with zombie dancers.

== Background and writing ==
"Waiting For The Night" was written by Furtado and co-written and produced by Rodney "Darkchild" Jerkins, who also produced her previous singles, "Parking Lot", "Spirit Indestructible", and "Big Hoops (Bigger the Better)". It was released as the third European single, on December 14, 2012, in Germany and later in the rest of Europe and Canada.

It is a dance-pop and electropop song with elements of Latin pop, house music, R&B, and folk featuring accordion and bagpipes. The song begins with a diary entry written by Furtado to introduce the song, featuring harp, bagpipes, sounds of waves and sea gulls. In the chorus she sings: "Day and night / Day and night / You blow my mind / Blow my mind." The songs ends with her father, Antonio Jose Furtado, saying, "Oh, man, that's so rock'n'roll". According to Furtado, it was inspired by a diary she kept as a smitten sixteen-year-old on a summer vacation in São Miguel Island, Portugal, her parents' birthplace.

Furtado commented about working with "Darkchild" on the album, stating:

Rodney "Darkchild" did eight tracks on my album and we hit it off really big, like it was a real epic moment meeting him, for me. And we were like kids just hanging out in the playground, you know? We really bring out each other's musicality, which I think was key and we were able to explore and be experimental, which I think is really imperative if you want to make a good pop album.

== Reception ==
=== Critical reception ===
The song received generally favorable reviews from music critics. Eric Henderson of Slant Magazine gave a positive review, writing that "On 'Waiting for the Night,' she snatches the beyond-played-out thrash-dance template (the song's melody and production both recall Jennifer Lopez's 'On the Floor') and makes it sound, if not fresh, then at least palpably urgent—that is, until it tags out on a wonky accordion riff." Robert Copsey of Digital Spy wrote that the song "features the best use of an accordion in pop music since The Wanted's 'Glad You Came'." For Colin McGuire of PopMatters, "Waiting For the Night" "sounds a lot like you may think a song named 'Waiting For the Night' may sound. The tribal groove echoes a 10-year-old Jennifer Lopez hit, though because of how outdated such a formula is in today’s EDM-filled universe, the whole thing never crosses into the accessibly endearing Top 40 orbit for which it longs." Alexandra Capotorto of Pop Crush called it "perhaps the catchiest single to come off the album, and with an easily memorable chorus."

=== Commercial performance ===
"Waiting For the Night" charted in some European countries. In Switzerland, the song peaked at number twenty-nine on the Schweizer Hitparade, becoming the highest-charting single of the album, surpassing "Spirit Indestructible", which peaked at number thirty-two. In Germany, the song peaked at number twenty-six. In Austria, it charted at number seventy-three on the Ö3 Austria Top 40 chart.

== Music video ==
On December 12, 2012, Furtado posted a picture of herself on the set of the video. Directed by The Seed Collective, the video was released via her official YouTube channel on January 8, 2013, at a total length of four minutes and thirty-one seconds. The video features Furtado performing the song in an underground club, while a group of foreign dancers perform the song around her. It first features Furtado in a white belly baring tank and pants, sporting what appears to be Día de los Muertos inspired makeup on only half of her face. The camera then pans to a number of dancers in the same style—only this time, they’re clad in white dresses and doing a choreography. Later, Furtado is dressed up and ready to tango. The video features So You Think You Can Dance Canada Season 4 winner Jordan Clark and runner-up Melissa Mitro as dancers.

== Live performances ==
Furtado performed the song on NRJ Stars For Free, in Zurich, Switzerland, on November 24, 2012. She performed the song on The Voice of Germany, as a duet with contestant James Borges, as well on La Voix (Québec) with singer songwriter Ariane Moffatt.

== Format and track listing ==
- German digital single
1. "Waiting for the Night" – 4:29
2. "Waiting for the Night" (Live Version) – 3:22
3. "Big Hoops (Bigger the Better)" (Wideboys Remix) – 6:27
4. "Parking Lot" (Tiësto Remix) – 4:40

== Credits and personnel ==
Credits are adapted from The Spirit Indestructible album liner notes.

Technical

- Recorded and mixed at 2nd Floor Studios, Hollywood, California.

Personnel

- Nelly Furtado—lyrics, lead and background vocals, vocal production, mixing
- Antonio Jose Furtado—vocals
- Rodney "Darkchild" Jerkins—music, production, vocal production, mixing
- Roy Bittan—accordion
- Matt Champlin—recording, mixing
- Orlando Vitto—recording
- Greg Morgan—sound design
- Brandon N. Caddell—engineering assistance
- Karl Campbell—additional claps

== Charts ==
=== Weekly charts ===
Weekly chart performance for "Waiting for the Night"
Chart (2013)	Peak position
Austria (Ö3 Austria Top 40)	73
Belgium (Ultratip Bubbling Under Flanders)	61
Canada Hot 100 (Billboard)	97
Canada AC (Billboard)	41
Canada CHR/Top 40 (Billboard)	42
Canada Hot AC (Billboard)	40
CIS Airplay (TopHit)	13
Germany (GfK)	26
Hungary (Rádiós Top 40)	23
Russia Airplay (TopHit)	10
Slovakia Airplay (ČNS IFPI)	28
Switzerland (Schweizer Hitparade)	29
Ukraine Airplay (TopHit)	8

=== Year-end charts ===
2013 year-end chart performance for "Waiting for the Night"
Chart (2013)	Position
Russia Airplay (TopHit)	58
Ukraine Airplay (TopHit)	33

== Release history ==
Country	Date	Format	Label	Ref.
Austria	December 14, 2012	Digital download	Universal	
Germany	December 14, 2012	Digital download	Universal	
Switzerland	December 14, 2012	Digital download	Universal	
