= Parking Lot (Nelly Furtado song) =

Single by Nelly Furtado

from the album The Spirit Indestructible
- Released: October 12, 2012
- Recorded: 2012
- Studio: 2nd Floor Studios (California, United States)
- Length: 5:25
- Label: Interscope, MMG
- Songwriters: Nelly Furtado; Rodney Jerkins
- Producer: Rodney "Darkchild" Jerkins

Nelly Furtado singles chronology
"Spirit Indestructible" (2012)	"Parking Lot" (2012)	"Waiting for the Night" (2012)

Music video
- "Parking Lot" on YouTube

"Parking Lot" is a song by Canadian singer-songwriter Nelly Furtado, from her fifth studio album, The Spirit Indestructible (2012). The song was written by Furtado and co-written and produced by Rodney "Darkchild" Jerkins, who also produced her two previous singles "Big Hoops" and "Spirit Indestructible". The song was released as the third single from the album on October 12, 2012.

It is an upbeat, mid-tempo song, featuring marching band, strong drums, sing-along chants, and a cowbell in the background. The song received favorable reviews from music critics, with some highlighting it as the best single from the album and commending Furtado's half-singing, half-rapping mode and called it a nostalgic track.

The music video was released on September 18, 2012, and it was directed by Ray Kay. The clip sees Furtado serving up funky dance moves with a crew of dancers. Those moves were compared to her 2006-2007 Loose era. It received positive reviews, with critics commending its visuals and her urban attitude.

In May 2025, Furtado teamed up with Don Diablo to release the single "Doing Nothin'" which interpolates her vocals from "Parking Lot".

== Background and composition ==
"Parking Lot" was written by Nelly Furtado and co-written and produced by Rodney "Darkchild" Jerkins, who also produced the two singles from "The Spirit Indestructible", "Big Hoops (Bigger the Better)", and "Spirit Indestructible. "Parking Lot" is an upbeat, mid-tempo song featuring a marching band, horns and percussion. "Bring your car to the parking lot and ride around till you get a spot, cuz we ain’t doing nothing, no, we ain’t doing nothing," Furtado sings. Furtado’s vocals drifted into sing-rap territory throughout the song: "I’m telling all my friends that it’s pretty casual," she declared at one point. The song's lyrics refer to her teenage years, where she and her friends would meet up in the parking lot of the Victoria, British Columbia 7-Eleven to find out where the parties were.

Furtado commented about the song:

"Nostalgia is a huge theme. All my old memories suddenly became crystal clear to me, and I found myself re-visiting my past in a fresh and colourful way, on songs such as 'Parking Lot', produced by Rodney 'Darkchild' Jerkins, where I detail good times in my hometown, sort of like my own take on 'Summer of '69'."

== Critical reception ==
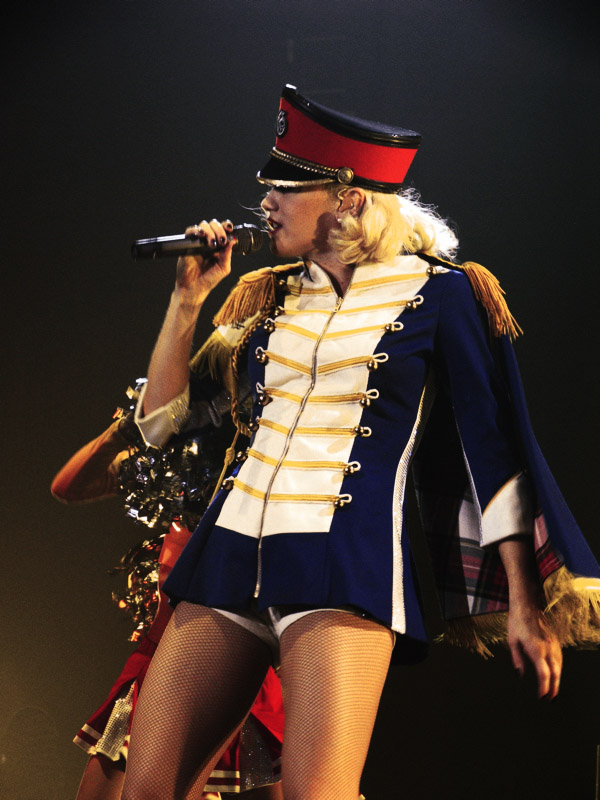
Some critics felt that the song resembles Gwen Stefani's "Hollaback Girl".

The song received favorable reviews from music critics. Robbie Daw of Idolator called it a "boom-boom-clap tune that’s somewhat reminiscent of Gwen Stefani's "Hollaback Girl", down to the marching band-esque brass sample and overall cheerleader vibe of Furtado's vocal delivery. Mike Bell of Postmedia News agreed, calling it "the album’s best moment, sounding like a Gwen Stefani-M.I.A mash-up". Eric Henderson of Slant Magazine also heard similarities with Gwen Stefani, writing that, "it sounds like she's trying to win a bet that she could turn the hook from George Harrison's 'Got My Mind Set on You' into a new Hollaback Girl." Scott Shetler of Pop Crush wrote that the song "has a nice groove punctuated by strong drums, sing-along chants, and possibly even a cowbell in the background. We like it even more than the two official singles we’ve heard so far from the album so far — the title track and ‘Big Hoops.’"

Robert Copsey of Digital Spy wrote that "the hypnotic, propelling melody of horns and synths will no doubt draw comparisons to MIA for its off-kilter vocals and bratty attitude as she sheepishly remarks: 'Bring your car to the parking lot and ride all night 'til you get a spot'." Alex Macpherson of Metro UK wrote that "the clattery, percussive rhythms of dancefloor-ready cuts such as Parking Lot harking back to Furtado hits Promiscuous and No Hay Igual." Katherine St Asaph of Popdust was positive, writing that "There’s enough of a particular guitar sound–you know the one, you’ve heard it – that it’s plausible this could actually be a radio hit (something that Furtado, thus far, hasn’t had for her album.) There’s cowbell. There’s some of that half-singing, half-rapping mode she’s particularly good at. And wordless-syllable breakdown/bridge/pre-chorus." The song was placed at number 98 on Pop Crush's "Top 100 Songs of 2012", being described as "awesome, riding an inscrutably funky stomp-clap hook, with Nelly playfully serving as head head cheerleader."

== Music video ==
The music video was directed by Ray Kay, who has directed videos for Justin Bieber, Britney Spears, Lady Gaga, Beyoncé and more. "This video has some special effects," said Furtado on the L.A. set. "We’re gonna have some really interesting cute creations with headlights. It’s gonna be kinda surreal." The video features a parking lot full of colorful custom Mini Coopers including ones covered in fur, newspapers, animal print, and even Christmas lights. Furtado dances on top of the cars and performs some choreographed moves with her dancers against a chain-link fence.

Nadine Cheung of Pop Dust wrote that, "while there isn’t much of a storyline to the video, it showcases her writhing new song and highlights its sassy urban inspiration." Sam Lansky of Idolator commented that "the clip sees Furtado serving up the same funky dance moves she showed off during her 2006-2007 Loose era, with a crew of dancers in too. 'Parking Lot' also pretty much gives us everything we could want from a Nelly video: Fast cars, turned-up swag and Furtado wearing animal print."

== Live performances ==
The song was performed on Walmart Soundcheck, Late Night With Jimmy Fallon, Live with Kelly and Michael, and The Wendy Williams Show.

== Track listing ==
- Digital download EP - The Remixes, Part 1
1. "Parking Lot" (Tiesto Remix) - 4:40
2. "Parking Lot" (WAWA Remix) - 3:33
3. "Parking Lot" (Wayne G and LFB Club Mix) - 4:29
4. "Parking Lot" (Trevor Simpson Remix) - 5:29
5. "Parking Lot" (Kill Paris Remix) - 6:22
6. "Parking Lot" (K Drew Remix) - 7:08
7. "Parking Lot" (Sem Thomasson Remix) - 4:54
- Digital download EP - The Remixes, Part 2
1. "Parking Lot" (Stefan Dabruck Club Mix) - 6:44
2. "Parking Lot" (Fagault & Marina Remix) - 4:21
3. "Parking Lot" (The Wizard Dancehall Remix) - 3:28
4. "Parking Lot" (Salva & Kuru Remix) - 4:00
5. "Parking Lot" (Whiite Remix) - 3:53

== Chart performance ==
Chart (2012)	Peak position
Canada CHR/Top 40 (Billboard)	44
South Korea (Gaon Singles Chart)	64
US Dance Club Songs	12
US Tropical Airplay	23
Venezuela Record Report	114

== Release history ==
Release dates and formats for "Parking Lot"
Region	Date	Format	Label	Ref.
Italy	October 12, 2012	Radio airplay	Universal	
United States	November 19, 2012	Digital download (remixes)	Interscope	
United States	November 27, 2012	Digital download (remixes)	Interscope	
