= Nelly Furtado =

Canadian singer (born 1978)

Nelly Furtado ComIH
- Nelly Furtado performing at Beyond the Valley 2022
- Born: Nelly Kim Furtado; December 2, 1978 (age 47); Victoria, British Columbia, Canada
- Occupations: Singer; songwriter; actress
- Years active: 1996–present
- Spouse: Demacio Castellón (m. 2008; sep. 2016)
- Children: 3
- Awards: Full list
- Musical career
- Genres: Pop; worldbeat; Latin; R&B
- Labels: DreamWorks; Geffen; Mosley; Nelstar (current); Universal Music Latin; Interscope; 21
- Website: nellyfurtado.com

Nelly Kim Furtado (Note: English: /fərˈtɑːdoʊ/ fər-TAH-doh, European Portuguese: [fuɾˈtaðu].) (born December 2, 1978) is a Canadian singer and songwriter. She has sold over 45 million records, including 35 million in album sales worldwide, making her one of the most successful Canadian artists. Critics have noted Furtado's musical versatility and experimentation with genres.

Furtado rose to prominence with her trip hop-influenced debut studio album, Whoa, Nelly! (2000), which was a critical and commercial success and spawned the top-10 Billboard Hot 100 singles "I'm Like a Bird" and "Turn Off the Light". The former track earned her a Grammy Award for Best Female Pop Vocal Performance. She followed it with the more introspective, folk-oriented Folklore (2003), which drew on her Portuguese heritage and performed less successfully than her debut.

Her third studio album, Loose (2006), sold over 10 million copies worldwide, becoming her best-selling release and one of the best-selling albums of the 21st century. Marked by a reinvention of her image and sound, the album produced the worldwide number-one singles "Promiscuous" (featuring Timbaland), "Maneater", "Say It Right", and "All Good Things (Come to an End)". During this period, she also featured alongside Justin Timberlake on Timbaland's "Give It to Me" (2007) and recorded the European hit duet "Broken Strings" with James Morrison (2008).

Furtado later released Mi Plan (2009), a Spanish-language album, which won the Latin Grammy Award for Best Female Pop Vocal Album, followed by The Spirit Indestructible (2012). After becoming independent, she released The Ride (2017) through her own label, Nelstar Entertainment [pt], and 7 (2024). Throughout her career, she has received numerous accolades, including one Grammy Award from seven nominations, one Latin Grammy Award, ten Juno Awards, one Brit Award, one Billboard Music Award, one MTV Europe Music Award, one World Music Award, and three MuchMusic Video Awards. She also has a star on Canada's Walk of Fame and was appointed a Commander of the Order of Prince Henry in 2014.

== Early life ==
Furtado was born on December 2, 1978, in Victoria, British Columbia, Canada. Her Portuguese parents, António José Furtado and Maria Manuela Furtado, were born on São Miguel Island in the Azores and had immigrated to Canada in the late 1960s. Nelly was named after Soviet gymnast Nellie Kim. Her elder siblings are Michael Anthony and Lisa Anne. They were raised Catholic. At age 4, she began performing and singing in Portuguese. Furtado's first public performance was when she sang a duet with her mother at a church on Portugal Day. She began playing musical instruments at the age of nine, learning the trombone, ukulele and, in later years, the guitar and keyboards. At the age of 12, she began writing songs, and as a teenager, she performed in a Portuguese marching band. Furtado has acknowledged her family as the source of her strong work ethic; she spent eight summers working as a chambermaid with her mother, along with her brother and sister, who was a housekeeper in Victoria.

== Career ==
=== 1996–1999: Career beginnings ===
After graduating from Mount Douglas Secondary School in 1996, she moved to Toronto to live with her sister. There, she got a full-time job at an alarm company. Later, she met Tallis Newkirk, member of the hip-hop group Plains of Fascination. She contributed vocals to their 1996 album, Join the Ranks, on the track "Waitin' 4 the Streets". The following year, she formed Nelstar, a trip hop duo with Newkirk. Ultimately, Furtado felt the trip hop style of the duo was "too segregated", and believed it did not represent her personality or allow her to showcase her vocal ability. She left the group and planned to move back home.

In 1997, she performed at the Honey Jam talent show. Her performance attracted the attention of The Philosopher Kings singer Gerald Eaton, who then approached her to write with him. He and fellow Kings member Brian West helped Furtado produce a demo. She left Toronto, but returned again to record more material with Eaton and West. The material recorded during these sessions was shopped to record companies by her attorney Chris Taylor and led to her 1999 record deal with DreamWorks Records, signed by A&R executive Beth Halper, partner of Garbage drummer and record producer Butch Vig. Furtado's first single, "Party's Just Begun (Again)", was released that year on the soundtrack album for Brokedown Palace (1999).

=== 2000–2005: Whoa, Nelly! and Folklore ===
Furtado continued the collaboration with Eaton and West, who co-produced her debut album, Whoa, Nelly!, which was released in October 2000. The album was an international success, supported by three international singles: "I'm Like a Bird", "Turn Off the Light", and "...On the Radio (Remember the Days)". It received four Grammy nominations in 2002, and her debut single won for Best Female Pop Vocal Performance. Furtado's work was also critically acclaimed for her innovative mixture of various genres and sounds. Slant Magazine called the album "a delightful and refreshing antidote to the army of 'pop princesses' and rap-metal bands that had taken over popular music at the turn of the millennium". The sound of the album was strongly influenced by musicians who had traversed cultures and "the challenge of making heartfelt, emotional music that's upbeat and hopeful". According to Maclean's magazine, Whoa, Nelly! had sold six million copies worldwide as of August 2006. Portions of the song "Scared of You" are in Portuguese, while "Onde Estás" is entirely in Portuguese, reflecting Furtado's Portuguese heritage. Following the release of the album, Furtado headlined the Burn in the Spotlight Tour and also appeared on Moby's 'lArea:One tour.

In 2002, Furtado appeared on the song "Thin Line", on underground hip-hop group Jurassic 5's album Power in Numbers. The same year, Furtado provided her vocals to the Paul Oakenfold song "The Harder They Come" from the album Bunkka. She also had a collaboration with Colombian artist Juanes in the song "Fotografía" (Photograph), where she demonstrated her command of the Spanish language. Furtado was also featured in "Breath" from Swollen Members' Monsters in the Closet album. The video for "Breath", directed by Todd McFarlane, won Best Rap Video at the 2003 MuchMusic Video Awards, and Video of the Year at the Western Canadian Music Awards. In 2002, Furtado was the recipient of an International Achievement Award at the SOCAN Awards in Toronto for her song "I'm Like a Bird".

Furtado's second album, Folklore, was released in November 2003. One of the tracks on the album, "Childhood Dreams", was dedicated to her infant daughter. The album includes the single "Força", the official anthem of the UEFA Euro 2004. Furtado performed the song in Lisbon in the final of the tournament, in which Portugal's national team played. The lead single released was "Powerless (Say What You Want)" and the second single was the ballad "Try". The album was not as successful as her debut, partly due to the album's less "poppy" sound, as well as underpromotion from her label DreamWorks Records. DreamWorks had just been sold to Universal Music Group at the time of the album's release. In 2005, DreamWorks Records and many of its artists, including Furtado, were absorbed into Geffen Records. "Powerless (Say What You Want)" was later remixed into a Spanish version called "Abre Tu Corazón", featuring Juanes, who had previously worked with Furtado on his track "Fotografía". The two collaborated again on "Te Busqué" (I Searched for You), a single from Furtado's 2006 album Loose. In 2003, Furtado won an International Achievement Award at the SOCAN Awards in Toronto for her song "Turn Off the Light".

=== 2006–2008: Loose ===
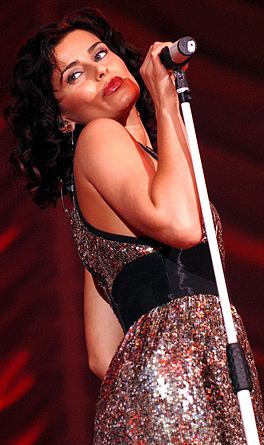
Furtado performing at Manchester Arena in February 2007

Furtado's third album, named Loose, after the spontaneous, creative decisions she made while creating the album, was released in June 2006. In this album, primarily produced by Timbaland, Furtado experiments with sounds from R&B, hip-hop, and 1980s music. Furtado herself describes the album's sound as punk-hop, described as "modern, poppy, spooky" and as having "a mysterious, after-midnight vibe... extremely visceral". She attributed the youthful sound of the album to the presence of her two-year-old daughter. The album received generally positive reviews from critics, with some citing the "revitalising" effect of Timbaland on Furtado's music, and others calling it "slick, smart and surprising".

Loose became the most successful album of Furtado's career to date, as it reached number one, not only in Canada and the United States, but also several countries worldwide. The album produced her first number-one hit in the United States, "Promiscuous", as well as her first number-one hit in the United Kingdom, "Maneater". The single "Say It Right" eventually became Furtado's most successful song worldwide, due to its huge success in Europe and in the United States, where it became her second number-one hit. "All Good Things (Come to an End)" became her most successful song in Europe, topping single charts in numerous countries there. On February 16, 2007, Furtado embarked on the "Get Loose Tour". She returned in March 2007 to her hometown of Victoria to perform a concert at the Save-On Foods Memorial Centre. In honour of her visit, local leaders officially proclaimed March 21, 2007, the first day of spring, as Nelly Furtado Day. After the tour, she released her first live DVD/CD named Loose the Concert. On April 1, 2007, Furtado was a performer and host of the 2007 Juno Awards in Saskatoon, Saskatchewan. She won all five awards for which she was nominated, including Album of the Year and Single of the Year. She also appeared on stage at the Concert for Diana at Wembley Stadium in London on July 1, 2007, where she performed "Say It Right", "Maneater", and "I'm Like a Bird".

In 2007, Furtado and Justin Timberlake were featured on Timbaland's single "Give It to Me", which became her third number-one single in the U.S. and second in the UK. In late 2008, Furtado collaborated with James Morrison on a song called "Broken Strings" for his album Songs for You, Truths for Me. The single was released on December 8 and peaked at No. 2 on the UK Singles Chart in early January. In 2008, she sang with the Italian group Zero Assoluto the ballad "Win or Lose – Appena prima di partire", released in Italy, France and Germany and whose video was shot in Barcelona. Furtado made a guest appearance on the song "Jump" by Flo Rida from his album R.O.O.T.S., and also made a guest appearance on Divine Brown's Love Chronicles, co-writing and singing on the background of the song "Sunglasses". Furtado married Cuban sound engineer Demacio "Demo" Castellón, with whom she had worked on the Loose album, on July 19, 2008.

=== 2009–2011: Mi Plan and The Best of Nelly Furtado ===
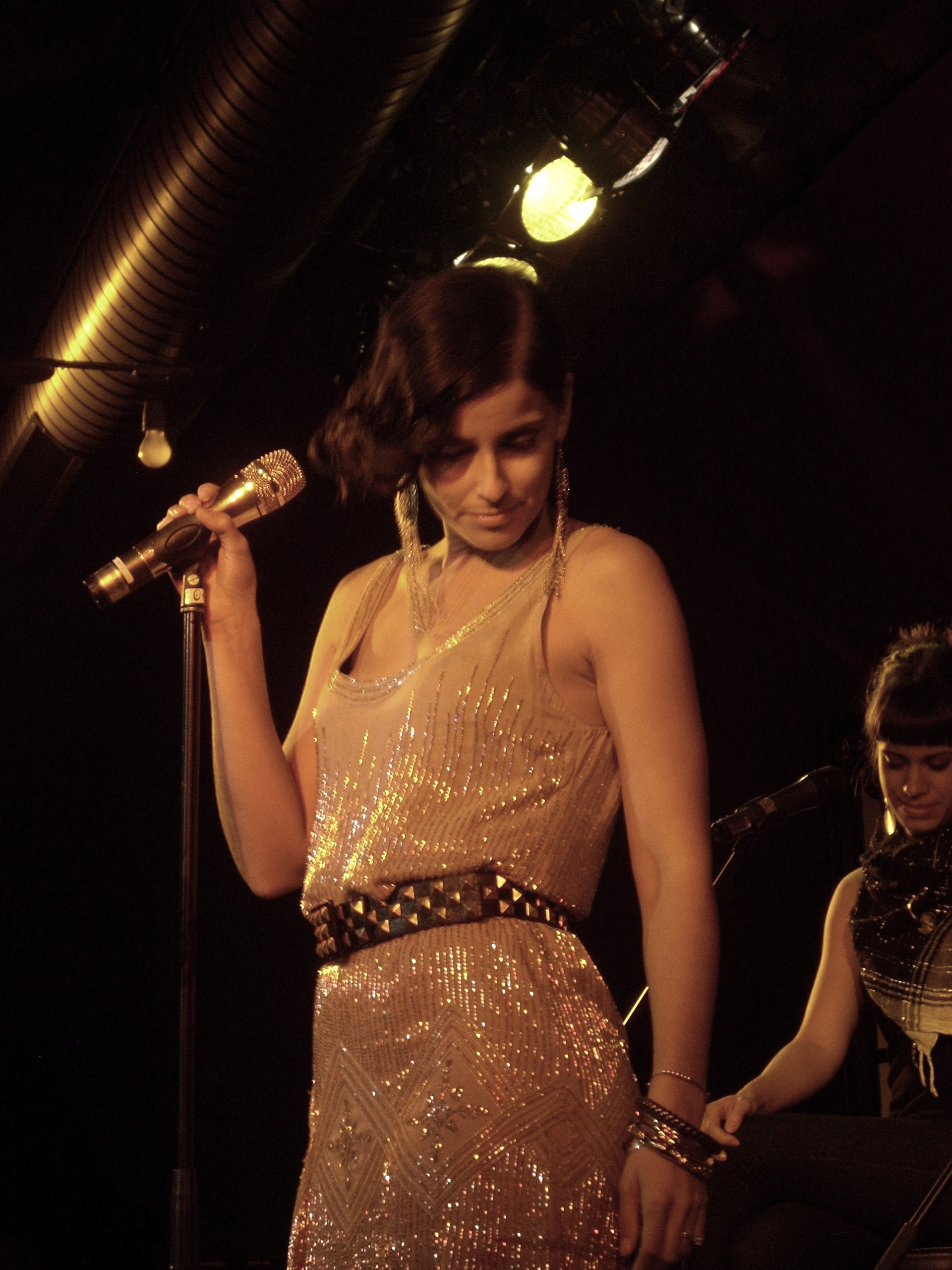
Furtado performing in Freiburg in October 2009

Furtado's debut Spanish album, Mi Plan was released with the first single, "Manos Al Aire" ("Hands in the Air"). She had formed her own record label, Nelstar, in conjunction with Canadian independent label group Last Gang Labels. The first act signed to Nelstar is Fritz Helder & the Phantoms. "Manos al Aire" was released on the new label. The second, third and fourth singles were "Más", "Mi Plan" and "Bajo Otra Luz" respectively. Furtado won the Latin Grammy Award for Best Female Pop Vocal Album for Mi Plan. She is the first Portuguese-Canadian to win a Latin Grammy award. Lifestyle, her planned fourth English studio album, was not released during the summer of 2010 in favour a second leg of her Mi Plan Tour. To promote the tour in Brazil, on March 24, 2010, Furtado made a "VIP Pocket Show" in reality show program Big Brother Brasil 10 from Rede Globo, the country's leading channel. Furtado participated in the live DVD recording of the Brazilian singer Ivete Sangalo in Madison Square Garden on September 4, 2010.

Furtado released Mi Plan Remixes featuring 12 tracks of remixed hits from Mi Plan. This album included the Original Spanglish Version of "Fuerte", her final release from Mi Plan. Furtado made a guest appearance on Canadian singer k-os's new album Yes!, collaborating alongside Saukrates on the song "I Wish I Knew Natalie Portman", released in early July 2009. Nelly Furtado also made a guest appearance on Tiësto's single "Who Wants to Be Alone" on his new album Kaleidoscope. Furtado sang in a duet with Bryan Adams at the opening ceremonies of the 2010 Vancouver Winter Olympic Games. The song was called "Bang the Drum" released on EMI album Sounds Of Vancouver 2010 (a commemorative album). Furtado was featured in a new song by N.E.R.D called "Hot-n-Fun". She also participated in the Young Artists for Haiti song, in which many Canadian artists came together and sang K'naan's song "Wavin' Flag" to raise money for the victims of the Haiti earthquake. Furtado was honoured with a star on Canada's Walk of Fame in October 2010.

Furtado released her first greatest hits album titled The Best of Nelly Furtado on November 16, 2010. Three new songs were included on the greatest hits album, including "Night Is Young", "Girlfriend in the City", and the Lester Mendez produced track, left over from the Loose sessions, "Stars". The album's first single, "Night Is Young", was released on October 12, 2010. Furtado had previously sung two of the new songs: "Girlfriend in the City" and "Night Is Young" at her concert in Warsaw, Poland. Furtado was featured on one of the Game's The R.E.D. Album tracks, titled "Mamma Knows" (produced by The Neptunes). For the Canadian film The Year Dolly Parton Was My Mom, Furtado lent her vocals for the Dolly Parton gospel cover "The Seeker" featured during the credits of the film.

=== 2012–2013: The Spirit Indestructible ===
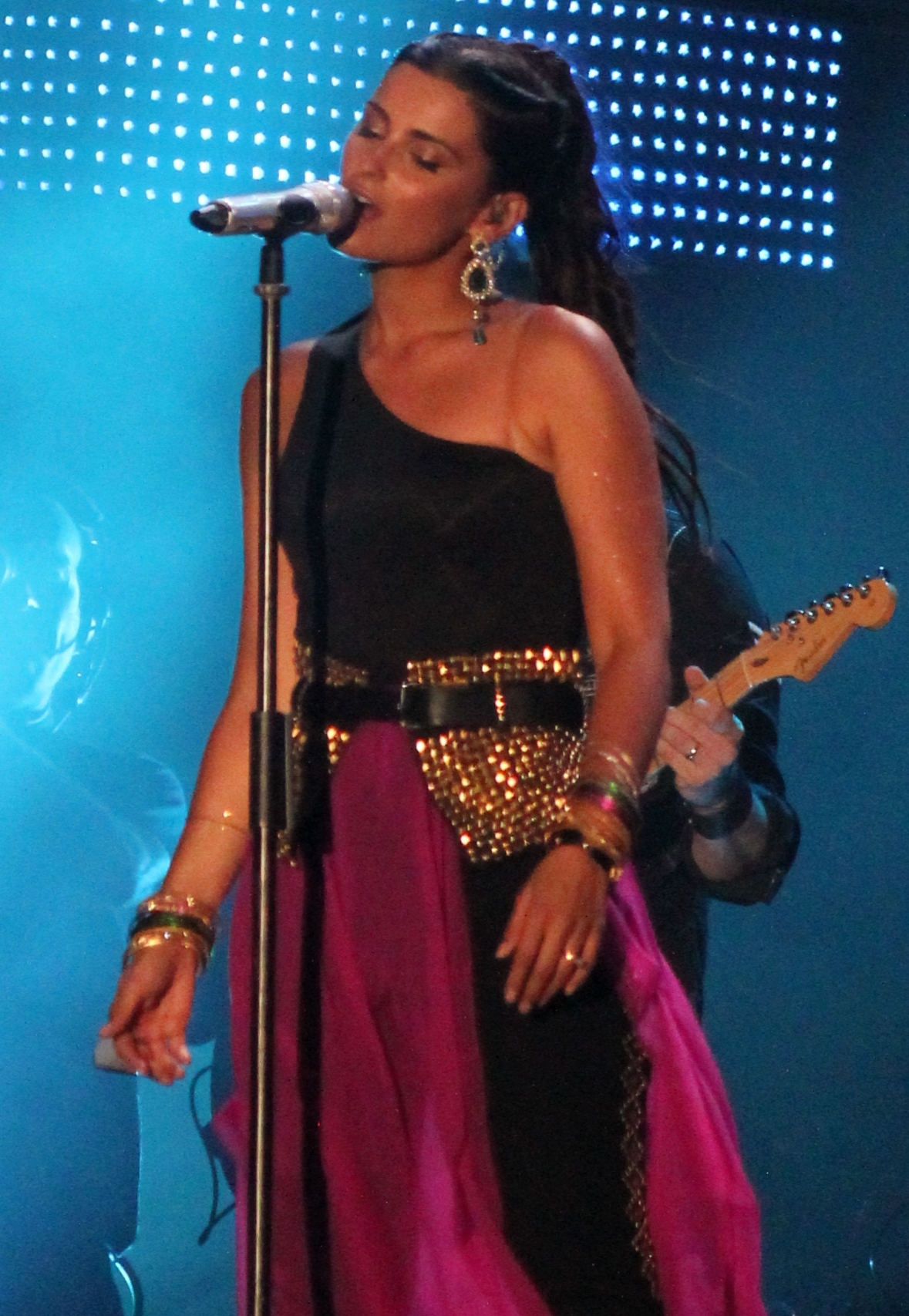
Furtado during the Isle of MTV in Malta, June 2012

Furtado collaborated with recording artist Alex Cuba and K'naan again. The duet with K'naan, "Is Anybody Out There", was released as the first single from his extended play More Beautiful than Silence. The song topped the charts in New Zealand and was successful in European territories as well as her native Canada. It also charted on the Billboard Hot 100. The Spirit Indestructible was released in September 2012. Furtado previously proclaimed that the album was most like her 2000 debut Whoa, Nelly!, but containing elements from urban, alternative, and reggae. The album's influences include Janelle Monáe, The xx, and Florence + the Machine. The album had input from producers such as The Neptunes, Tiësto, Timbaland, Rick Nowels, Ryan Tedder, and Rodney Jerkins.

The first single from The Spirit Indestructible, "Big Hoops (Bigger the Better)", was released digitally on April 17, 2012 and was sent to North American radio stations on May 1, 2012. The song was commercially successful in the United Kingdom, Belgium and the Netherlands, but underperformed in other territories. The second single and title track performed well in Germany and Slovakia and charted in Japan, peaking at number 79 on the Hot 100. Other singles, "Parking Lot" and "Waiting for the Night", charted in Canada and several European territories.

Furtado continued to collaborate with hip-hop producer Salaam Remi, who previously worked on the 2010 single "Night Is Young", on "The Edge". The lyrics for the Salaam Remi produced track are reported to be influenced by the Tiger Woods cheating scandal, in which was originally referred to as "Elin's Song". Furtado promoted the album on her The Spirit Indestructible Tour.

=== 2014–2019: Independence and The Ride ===
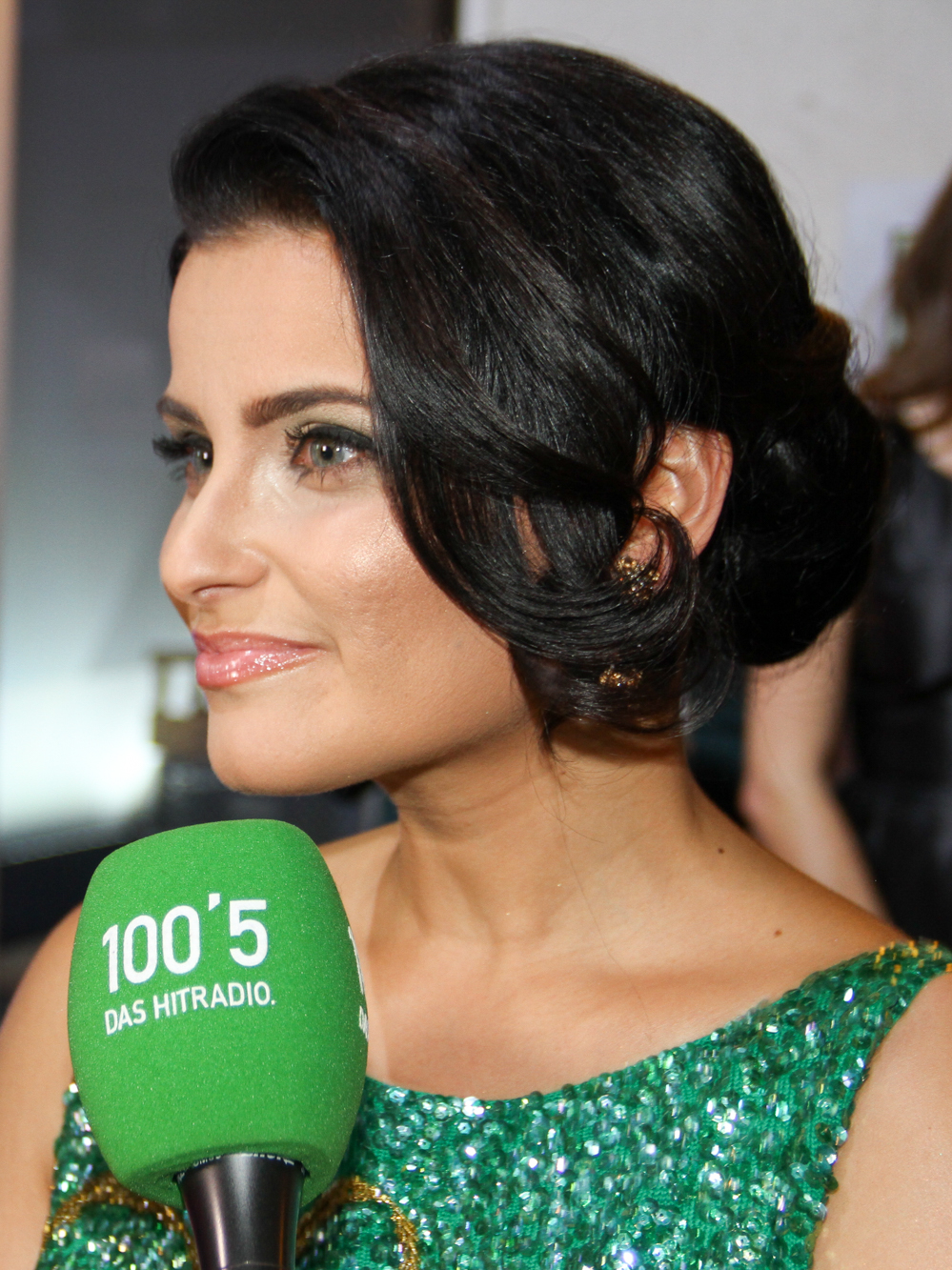
Furtado in 2014

In February 2015, Furtado co-headlined Switzerlands Art on Ice tour with Tom Odell. In 2016, Furtado appeared in a minor supporting role in the romantic comedy film A Date with Miss Fortune.

On February 14, 2016, Furtado performed the Canadian national anthem at the 2016 NBA All-Star Game, which was held in Toronto. This was the second time Furtado performed at the NBA All-Star Game, having performed "O Canada" at the 2004 NBA All-Star Game. That same month, she began teasing new music via social media, suggesting that the album would have a connection to Dallas, Texas, where much of the album was recorded. In 2016, Furtado collaborated with Dev Hynes on the track "Hadron Collider". The track appears on Hynes' album Freetown Sound.

In July 2016, Furtado released "Behind Your Back" exclusively on Spotify, describing the song as an "appetizer" for her next album. Following the release, in an interview with CBC Player, Furtado stated that her album was finished and she had recorded 16 songs with John Congleton. On September 8, 2016, Furtado confirmed the title of the upcoming album, The Ride, which was released in March 2017. During the interview she also confirmed a new track off the album titled "Islands of Me", which was released on streaming services on September 10, 2016. The album's first released song "Pipe Dreams" was released to SoundCloud on November 8, 2016, with the release accompanied by a short teaser video of the album on YouTube. The cover song "Sticks & Stones" from her album was re-made by Metro with newly recorded vocals by Furtado in May 2018. It later reached number one on the Billboard Dance Club Songs chart. The official remixes include StoneBridge, Bimbo Jones, Manuel Riva & Cristian Poow.

=== 2020–present: Anniversary reissues, 7 and performing retirement ===
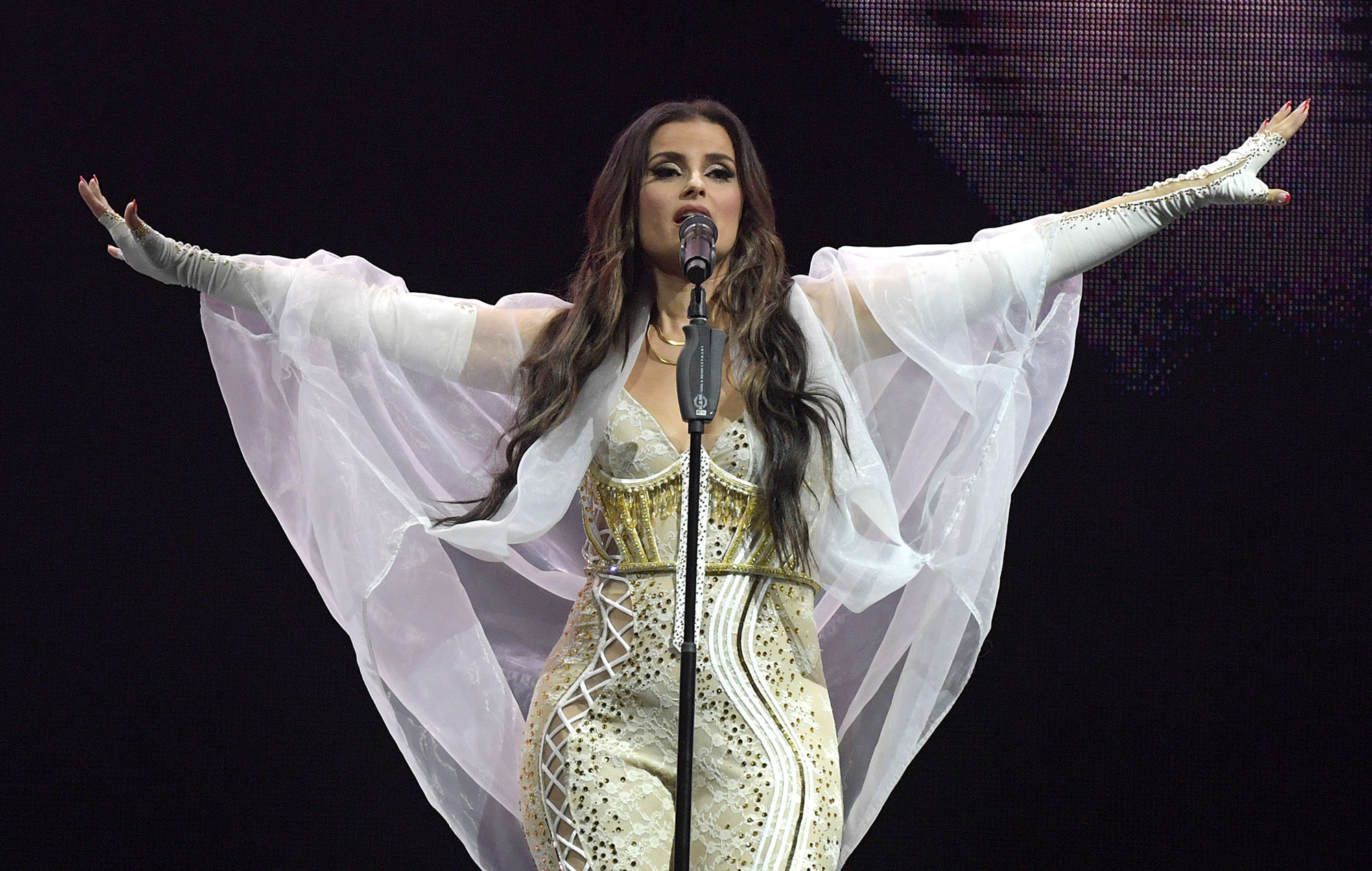
Furtado during Beyond The Valley on December 31, 2022

In October 2020, Furtado celebrated the 20th anniversary of her debut studio album, Whoa, Nelly! by releasing an expanded edition of 22 tracks to digital and streaming platforms.

In May 2021, Furtado collaborated with German duo Quarterhead on a remix of her song "All Good Things (Come to an End)". In June 2021, Furtado celebrated the 15th anniversary of her third studio album Loose by releasing an expanded edition of 32 tracks to digital and streaming platforms.

In July 2022, after a five-year performing hiatus, Furtado joined Drake on stage for the latter's October World Weekend concert in Toronto, where they performed "Promiscuous" and "I'm Like a Bird". She confirmed new music in May 2023 in an interview on Fault Magazine: "I have so much music. I've recorded a hundred songs in the last 18 months, and I'm so excited to bring people new music." She also confirmed she recorded some collaborations with artists such as Canadian singer-songwriter Charlotte Day Wilson, Colombian band Bomba Estéreo, Colombian-Canadian singer-songwriter Lido Pimienta. On December 31, 2022, five years after her last concert in Baloise Session in Basel, Switzerland, Furtado performed live at the Beyond The Valley Festival in Australia.

Furtado continued performing live in 2023. While performing at Machaca Fest in Monterrey, Nuevo León, Mexico she performed a verse from a new song titled "Corazón". Furtado collaborated with Australian DJ and producer Dom Dolla on the song "Eat Your Man", that was released on June 2, 2023, her first single release after five years. On September 1, 2023, she released a new collaboration with Timbaland and Justin Timberlake titled "Keep Going Up", sixteen years after their previous release of "Give It to Me". In August 2023, Furtado reunited with Juanes to record "Gala y Dalí", 22 years after their first recording together, "Fotografía", and 18 years after their last release together, "Te Busqué". The song was released on March 28, 2024, on streaming and digital download platforms.

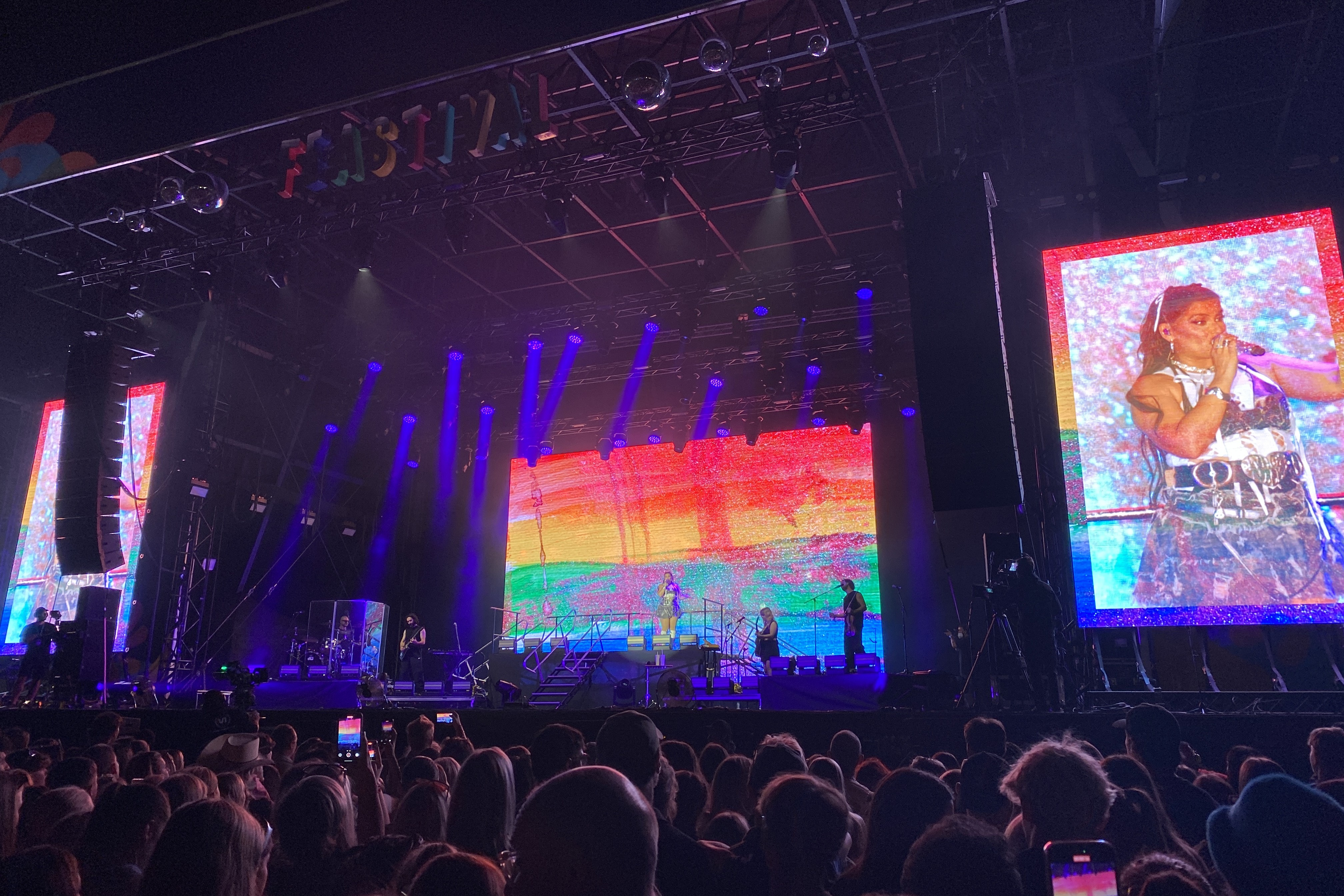
Furtado performing in Kingham in 2025

In March 2024, in an interview on Euphoria Magazine, Furtado revealed that her seventh album was forthcoming. On May 22, 2024, Furtado released the single, "Love Bites", featuring Swedish singer Tove Lo and British DJ SG Lewis. On July 12, 2024, Furtado released "Corazón" as a single, more than a year after singing it for the first time in Monterrey, Mexico. The song features Colombian band Bomba Estéreo. In summer 2024, she appeared at numerous music festivals, including Mighty Hoopla and Isle of MTV. Furtado's seventh studio album, 7, was released on September 20, 2024. On Christmas Day 2024, 25 December, Furtado released a remixed version of "Showstopper" as the album's next single; this version featured British rapper AJ Tracey.

On May 30, 2025, Furtado collaborated with Don Diablo on the single "Doing Nothin'", which interpolates sections of her 2012 single "Parking Lot". During August 2025, she embarked on a festival tour in Europe and United Kingdom. In October 2025, Furtado announced on her social media her retirement from live performances "for the foreseeable future" to pursue other creative and personal endeavors.

On April 10, 2026, Furtado released "Electric Circus", a collaborative single with Boi-1da and Canada Soccer; the song debuted at number 35 on the Canada CHR/Top 40 chart. On May 29, 2026, she released the single "Torture of the Heart", in collaboration with fellow-Canadian duo Dvbbs. On August 20, 2026, she announced a twentieth anniversary edition of Loose, due for release in September 4, 2026; a day later, Furtado released "Maneater" (RITUAL Version). The new deluxe edition includes 10 bonus tracks: 4 of them are reinterpretations featuring American pianist and instrumentalist Adam Tendler (including the aforementioned "Maneater" version), the other four are unreleased demos from 2005 and 2006 (including "I Am" —previously leaked at the end of 2005— and a secret demo version of "All Good Things (Come to an End)" featuring Coldplay vocalist Chris Martin) and two newly recorded songs.

== Other ventures ==
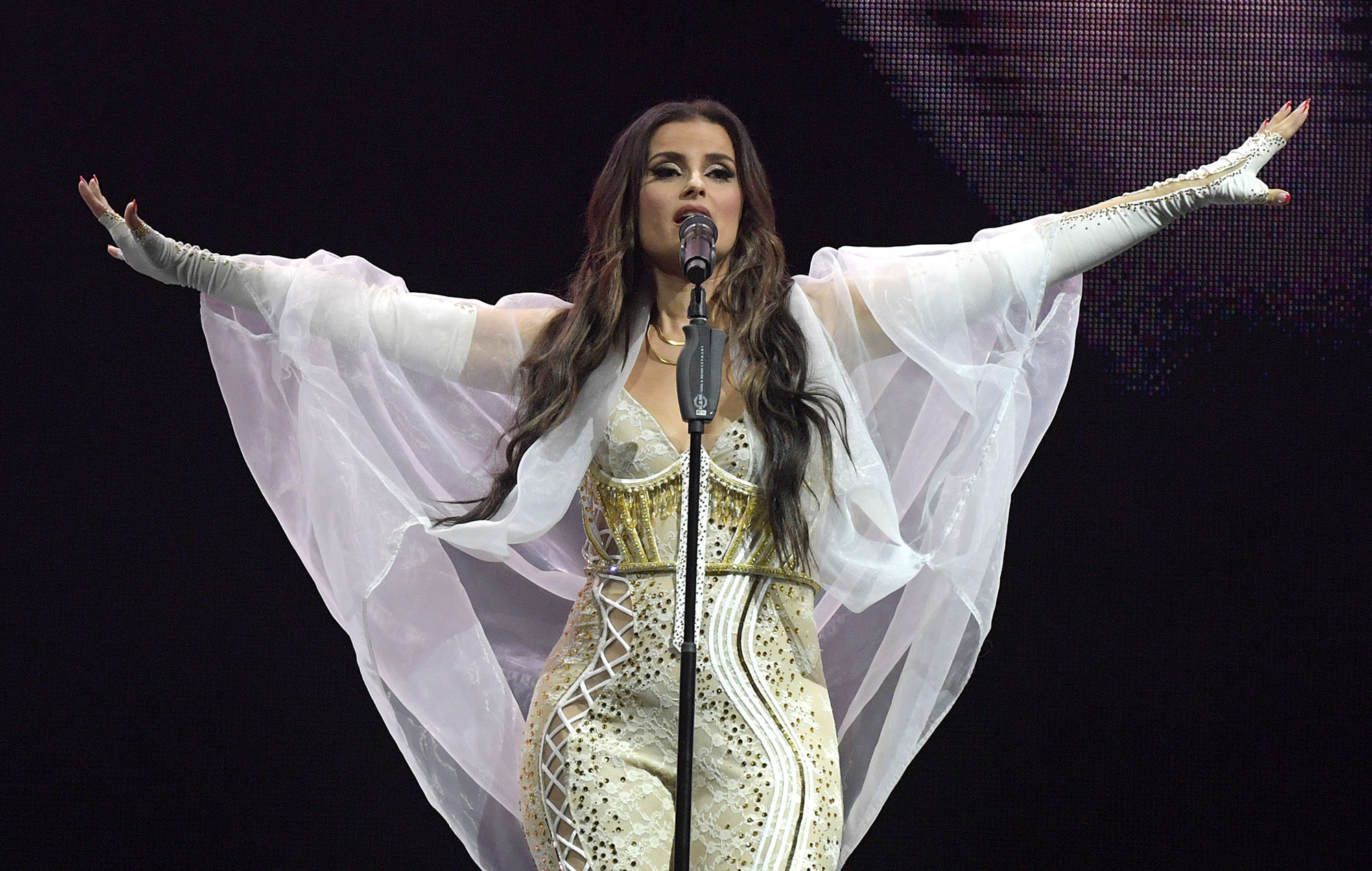
Furtado in 2022

Furtado has appeared on the cover of numerous international lifestyle and fashion magazines, including Canada's Flare and Elle; Russia's Elle Girl; Hungary's Shape; Portugal's Vogue; Germany's Maxim; and US' Teen People, Vanidades and YM. She has appeared on the cover of several international editions of Cosmopolitan (Turkey, Italy, Lithuania, Poland, Serbia and Hungary). She was voted one of the "Fun and Fearless Females" by Cosmopolitan in 2002. In October 2023, Furtado appeared in Kim Kardashian's shapewear brand Skims' campaign alongside other celebrities, including Kim Cattrall, Lana Condor, Coco Jones and Hari Nef.

== Personal life ==
Furtado learned Portuguese up to the age of 12. She studied Spanish in high school and in 2009 estimated that her command of it was fifty to sixty percent. At the age of 14 she dated rapper Prevail, who went on to form Swollen Members. After Prevail stopped contacting her, she wrote many songs, describing it to Vice as her "first puppy love heartbreak". She also said "he helped birth the R&B singer in me". The pair later collaborated on the Swollen Members track "Breath".

From 2001 to 2005, Furtado was in a relationship with Jasper Gahunia. Their daughter was born in September 2003. On July 19, 2008, Furtado married sound engineer Demacio Castellon, with whom she had worked on Loose. They separated in 2016. She has a daughter and son with American rapper Jerry (FKA Hodgy Beats).

In a June 2006 interview with Genre magazine, when asked if she had "ever felt an attraction to women", Furtado replied, "Absolutely. Women are beautiful and sexy". Some considered this an announcement of her bisexuality; in August 2006, she clarified that she was "straight, but very open-minded".

In November 2006, Furtado revealed that she once turned down US$500,000 to pose fully clothed in Playboy.

Furtado publicly endorsed Green Party leader Elizabeth May in Saanich-Gulf Islands during the federal election in 2011.

In March 2017, Furtado stated that she resided in Toronto and New York City. In an April 2017 interview with DIY magazine, Furtado revealed she had purchased an apartment in New York City. In a May 2023 interview with Fault magazine, Furtado revealed she had recently been diagnosed with ADHD.

== Philanthropy ==
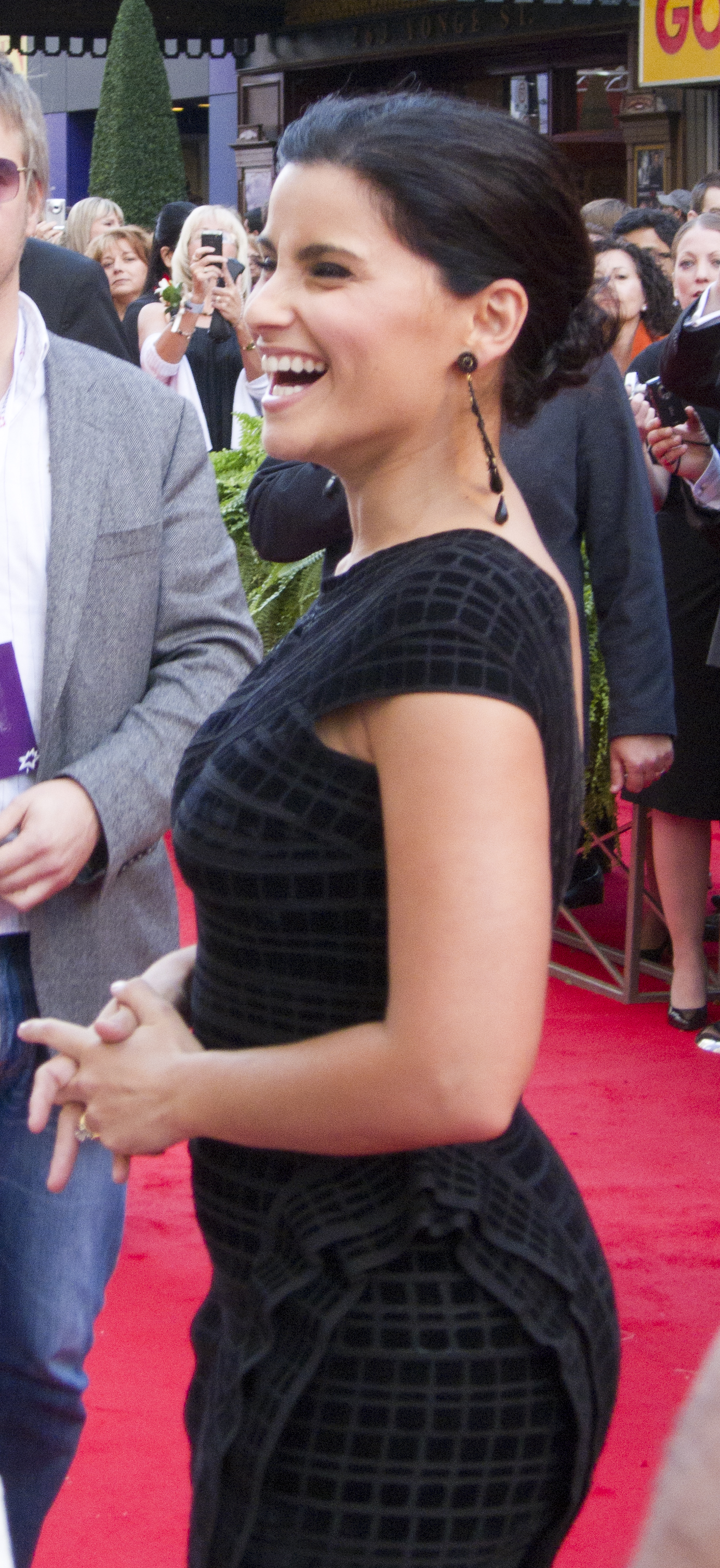
Furtado at her Canada's Walk of Fame induction ceremony in October 2010

In 2007, Furtado hosted a program about AIDS on MTV, which also featured guests Justin Timberlake and Alicia Keys. On September 27, 2011, Furtado announced during Free the Children's We Day, that she was donating CDN$1,000,000 to support Free the Children's effort to build girls' schools in the Maasai region of Kenya.

Furtado is a member of the Canadian charity Artists Against Racism.

== Artistry ==
Furtado possesses a mezzo-soprano voice. Kristie Rohwedder of Bustle Magazine characterizes it as "soaring" while Sal Cinquemani of Slant Magazine calls it "nasally". During her childhood and youth, Furtado embraced many musical genres, listening heavily to mainstream rock, R&B, hip-hop, alternative hip-hop, drum and bass, trip hop, world music (including Portuguese fado, Brazilian bossa nova and Indian music), and a variety of others. Her biggest influence when growing up was Ani DiFranco; she explained that "[w]hen I was a teenager, I wanted to be Ani DiFranco. I never wanted to be part of corporate music." She cites diverse influences, including Madonna, Mariah Carey, Blondie, Prince, The Police, Eurythmics, Talking Heads, De La Soul, TLC, Nusrat Fateh Ali Khan, Amália Rodrigues, Caetano Veloso, Juanes, Jeff Buckley, Esthero, Björk, Cornershop, Oasis, Radiohead, The Smashing Pumpkins, U2, and Beck.

Furtado's work has inspired singers such as Lorde, Slayyyter, Dua Lipa, Bridgit Mendler and Gia Woods.

== Discography ==
- Whoa, Nelly! (2000)
- Folklore (2003)
- Loose (2006)
- Mi Plan (2009)
- The Spirit Indestructible (2012)
- The Ride (2017)
- 7 (2024)

== Tours ==
Headlining

- Burn in the Spotlight Tour (2001–2002)
- Come as You Are Tour (2004)
- Get Loose Tour (2007–2008)
- Mi Plan Tour (2010)
- The Spirit Indestructible Tour (2013)
- Summer Tour (2017)
- Better Than Ever Summer Festival Tour (2025)

Co-headlining

- Area Festival (2001)
- Art on Ice (2015)

Opening act

- Elevation Tour (2001)
- Musicology Live 2004ever (2004)

== Filmography ==
Nelly Furtado filmography
Year	Title	Role	Notes	Performance or role
2001	Roswell	Herself	Episode: "Baby, It's You"	Performed "I'm Like a Bird"
2006	Floribella	Herself	3 episodes	Performed "Maneater"
2007	One Life to Live	Herself	Episode: "Episode 1.9875"	Performed "Say It Right" and "Promiscuous"
2007	CSI: NY	Ava Brandt	Episode: "Some Buried Bones"	Played Ava, a professional criminal accused of murder.
2007	Punk'd	Herself	Episode: "Episode 8.1"	A victim of a bomb scare
2008	Max Payne	Christa Balder	Video game adaptation	The wife of Max Payne's slain ex-partner
2010	Big Brother Brasil 10	Herself	Brazilian reality show	Live performance
2010	Score: A Hockey Musical	Claudette	Canadian film	
2012	90210	Herself	Episode: "Hate 2 Love"	Performed "Parking Lot"
2015	A Date with Miss Fortune	Nelia	Canadian film	
2016	Madonna: Rebel Heart Tour	Herself / Unapologetic Bitch	Documentary film	
2020	Bread Barbershop	Macaron	Episode: "Macaron's Holiday/Macaron"	Singing voice
2024	Canada's Drag Race	Herself	Episode: "Grand Finale"	Guest Judge
2024	The Greatest Hits	Herself	American film	

== Awards and nominations ==
- List of awards and nominations received by Nelly Furtado
