= The Spirit Indestructible =

2012 studio album by Nelly Furtado

Studio album by Nelly Furtado
- Released: September 14, 2012
- Recorded: 2009–2012
- Studios: 2nd Floor, Henson Recording (Los Angeles, California); Instrument Zoo (Miami, Florida); Orange Lounge (Toronto, Canada); Gigantic Studios (Brooklyn, New York); The Green Building (Santa Monica, California); Big Ship Studios (Kingston, Jamaica)
- Genres: Dance-pop; electronic; alternative pop; folk rock
- Length: 49:44
- Labels: Mosley; Interscope
- Producers: Michael Angelakos; The Demolition Crew; Nelly Furtado; Rodney "Darkchild" Jerkins; Devrim "DK" Karaoglu; Andre Lindal; Stephen "Di Genius" McGregor; Rick Nowels; Bob Rock; Salaam Remi; John Shanks; Fraser T. Smith; Chris Zane

Nelly Furtado chronology
The Best of Nelly Furtado (2010)	The Spirit Indestructible (2012)	The Ride (2017)

Singles from The Spirit Indestructible
- 1. "Big Hoops (Bigger the Better)" Released: April 16, 2012; 2. "Spirit Indestructible" Released: July 31, 2012; 3. "Parking Lot" Released: September 18, 2012; 4. "Waiting for the Night" Released: December 14, 2012

The Spirit Indestructible is the fifth studio album by Canadian singer-songwriter Nelly Furtado. It was released on September 14, 2012, via Mosley Music Group and Interscope Records. Created over several years with a variety of producers including Salaam Remi, Di Genius, and Darkchild, and inspired by personal growth, global travel, and experiences such as her trip to Kenya, the album is eclectic, blending hip hop, R&B, dance, rock, and drum and bass, and thematically explores nostalgia, empowerment, and spirituality, Furtado served as the executive producer for the album as well as a principal writer.

Reviews were mixed, with some critics praising the album's energetic production, versatility, and emotional depth, while others found it uneven and criticized it for lacking a clear artistic identity and failing to recapture the impact of Furtado's previous English language album Loose. Commercially, The Spirit Indestructible also underperformed compared to Loose, debuting at number 79 on the US Billboard 200 and missing the top 40 of the UK Albums Chart, though it reached the top 20 in Canada and achieved top ten chart placements in Germany, Switzerland, and Austria.

Four singles were released from the album: "Big Hoops (Bigger the Better)" served as the lead single, followed by the title track "Spirit Indestructible" as the second European single, while "Parking Lot" was released as the second North American single. The third European single was "Waiting for the Night." The Spirit Indestructible was nominated for the Juno Award for Pop Album of the Year in 2013, and Furtado supported the album with The Spirit Indestructible Tour, which ran from January to March 2013 across Canada and Central Europe.

== Background ==
The Spirit Indestructible marked Furtado's first English language studio album since Loose (2006). She began to work in 2009, just after the release of her Spanish album Mi Plan. Furtado worked with a variety of producers. She collaborated with a variety of producers, beginning with Salaam Remi, who had also produced tracks for Mi Plan. She described his sound as "classic", "authentic" and "super soulful". She also traveled to Jamaica to work on reggae-influenced material with Di Genius, producing the track "Don't Leave Me," which she described as a "real moment on the album." By 2011, she collaborated with Darkchild, who produced the bulk of the album; Furtado spoke on working with him saying, "I feel like a child in a playground, uninhibited and happy". The first track they worked on was "Spirit Indestructible", which she called an "ode to the spirit which resides in all of us and triumphs over anything".

During her trip to Kenya for Free the Children, she met The Kenyan Boys Choir with whom she worked on a track called "Thoughts" produced by herself and The Demolition Crew. It was also remixed by Tiësto and added to the deluxe edition of the album. Furtado described it as the "perfect laidback track" and shows the "mellow side" of the DJ. By February 2012, via a TSI webisode, she worked with Bob Rock and Fraser T Smith. From that session, "Believers (Arab Spring)" and "End of the World" made the final cut. She recorded around forty tracks for this album, and twenty two made the final cut. Other songs considered for inclusion on the album but did not make the final cut are "Alone", "Lose", "The Edge" and "Mystery"—which she performed at a festival. Talking about the recording sessions, she stated, "It's overall quite a simple, at times juvenile album that was very liberating to create and gave me immense joy."

== Concept and influences ==
Following the introduction, she said that nostalgia is a major theme of the album and it revisits her past in a "fresh and colorful way". Also, she included that she wrote the songs in "intense personal growth" and they have "incredible meaning" to her. The first single, "Big Hoops (Bigger the Better)", is about finding strength and confidence in the size of her earrings. She is "channeling her 14-year-old-self", as she talks about her love for hip hop and R&B. The song is inspired by when Nelly took her big sister's hoop earrings and went with her friends to the mall and freestyled "like they were already famous". She quotes lyrics from the likes of Boyz II Men, Brandy, Salt N Pepa. She stated, "Hip-hop was super-exotic to us in Canada [...] I remember attaching a wire clothing hanger to the antenna of my radio in my bedroom, so I could get the frequency and get that station and listen to the top 10 every night." Ironically, Darkchild is responsible for the songs she loved when she was young, which she only realized later. "Parking Lot", the first official single in the United States, is where she revisits the memories of her hometown, as noted by the teenage-like lyrics. She sings "Meet us in the parking lot/we're gonna turn the speakers up", over a boom-boom-clap beat and a horn loop. She also referred to the song as her take on Bryan Adams' 1984 song "Summer of '69". "Waiting for the Night" is inspired by a diary she kept as smitten sixteen-year-old on a summer vacation on São Miguel Island, Portugal.

The second European single, "Spirit Indestructible", is a tribute to the humanity. It was inspired by people that she met and people in history that she has read in books about. Her trip in Kenya, for Free the Children inspired her to write the song. The theme of spirituality is also developed on songs like "Miracles", "The Most Beautiful Thing" or "Believers (Arab Spring)" where she sings about grace, joy and faith. "High Life" is about what happens after all your dreams came true and the process of running from your hometown to seek "success", and what happens when you obtain it. The song is partly inspired by a breakdown she had on stage during her Get Loose Tour. Furtado spoke on her influence for the album, saying, "I experienced real joy for the first time, Communal joy. Obviously giving birth was joyful, personally. But when I went to Africa, I really experienced people celebrating and being joyful together for the first time. It really reinforced my belief in humanity. It reminded me who I am. That's why the album is so childlike. The experience also inspired the album's title track, which pays tribute to mankind's ability to overcome adversity. "So many things have happened that have inspired me in a lot of ways to believe in humanity." Furtado spoke about the title of the album saying, "It's an ode to the spirit which resides in all of us and triumphs over anything. It is inspired by people I have met, and special moments in history that I have read about." then about the album artwork "It's light in color so that it's black-sharpie-ready for when I sign CDs for the beautiful fans." The whole album is described as "raw and honest" and a "friendly punch in the face." The album is eclectic; it contains elements from hip hop, R&B, dance, rock and drum & bass. Furtado proclaims that the overall sound of The Spirit Indestructible would be most similar to her debut album Whoa, Nelly!, with the romance of Folklore, the drama of Loose, and the passion of Mi Plan. The influences for the album range from Janelle Monáe, The xx, to Florence and the Machine.

== Promotion ==
=== Singles ===
The lead single from The Spirit Indestructible, "Big Hoops (Bigger the Better)", was released digitally on April 17, 2012. It was officially sent to US radio on May 1, 2012. It was released in Germany on May 18, 2012, and in the United Kingdom on June 3, 2012. The single was intended to be a club single but was still released to all formats as the lead single. The second European single from the album is the title track, "Spirit Indestructible". The official music video for "Spirit Indestructible" was released on July 18, 2012. The single was made available for purchase at several international iTunes stores on July 31, 2012, and subsequently in the United States on August 14, 2012. It was released in Germany on August 3, 2012. "Parking Lot", the second North American single was sent to radio on September 17, with the official music video coming out that day too. "Waiting for the Night" is the third European single, and was released as a digital download in Germany on December 14, 2012.

=== Performances ===
In further support of The Spirit Indestructible Furtado embarked on her fifth concert tour, The Spirit Indestructible Tour, which was announced on November 13, 2012, via her official website. The tour began on January 8, 2013, and concluded on March 15, 2013, comprising 25 shows in total: 15 in Canada and 10 in Central Europe. It faced challenges with low ticket sales, resulting in several cancellations and the relocation of some shows to smaller venues. To compensate for the cancelled dates, additional performances were scheduled in Burlington and Belleville. Canadian singer-songwriter Dylan Murray, signed to Furtado's label Nelstar Records, served as the tour's opening act and also joined Furtado for a live duets. Leading up to the tour, local media and radio stations organized ticket contests, including Ocean 98.5 in Victoria, the Huffington Post Canada across Canadian dates, and Mississauga News for the Toronto show.

== Critical reception ==
Professional ratings
Aggregate scores
Source	Rating
Metacritic	57/100
Review scores
Source	Rating
AllMusic	3.5/5 stars
Chicago Tribune	2.5/4 stars
The Guardian	3/5 stars
Los Angeles Times	3.5/4 stars
Metro	3/5 stars
PopMatters	4/10
Rolling Stone	2/5 stars
Slant Magazine	3.5/5 stars
Time Out	3/5 stars

The Spirit Indestructible received generally mixed reviews from music critics. At Metacritic, which assigns a weighted mean rating out of 100 to reviews from mainstream critics, the album received an average score of 57, based on 9 reviews. Randall Roberts of The Los Angeles Times praised the album as a "thick, jam-filled joyride" with greater emotional depth than most of Furtado's contemporaries. He commended the production work of Jerkins, Remi, and Angelekos, arguing that Jerkins' contributions felt "vital and of-the-moment." Roberts concluded that the album showcases innovation and rhythmic ambition, concluding that Furtado "proves nearly untouchable." Dana Moran of the Chicago Tribune called it a "good album, if a little disjointed at times," highlighting its reflective lyrics and infectious beats, particularly on tracks such as "Parking Lot." Writing for The Guardian, Caroline Sullivan described the album as "decent," arguing that it retains the "spanking pop savvy" of Loose despite some overly earnest moments. Eric Henderson of Slant Magazine applauded Furtado's versatility and vocal performance. He wrote that "Big Hoops (Bigger the Better)" "shouldn't work as well as it does; but it does because of Furtado," and concluded that "whether her strategy is to sing-song her way beyond the abrasive edges or to conversely turn her voice into an even more abrasive element, Furtado makes it all work."

Stephen Thomas Erlewine of AllMusic offered a more mixed assessment, stating that while the album aims to combine the introspection of Folklore with the pop craftsmanship of Loose, it is "not entirely successful." He criticized attempts to recapture earlier club successes, particularly on "Big Hoops (Bigger the Better)," but praised its meditative elements as "a curiously shimmering electronic folk-rock." Despite its "contradictions and clumsiness," Erlewine found it "hard not to admire," calling it "a major-label album that bears the unmistakably messy, human stamp of an artist." Entertainment Weekly's Kyle Anderson concluded that "without Timbaland's loopy sonic mugging, she's a program-seeking robot wandering through a wasteland of electro-funk also-rans and half-baked nods to hip-hop. At least she’s self-aware enough to know who the problem is." Similarly critical, Rolling Stone reviewer Jody Rosen wrote that Furtado "tries awfully hard to be Rihanna – when she's not trying to be M.I.A. or Madonna," criticizing what he perceived as a lack of artistic identity. He argued that while producer Rodney Jerkins "keeps the beats tight and hooks polished," the album suffers from a "flaming identity crisis," calling it "cringe listening." Metro concluded that The Spirit Indestructible "tries to pick up where 2006 hit Loose left off, but it lacks the blows to match her former success."

== Commercial performance ==
The Spirit Indestructible failed to replicate the success of her previous English-language album, Loose, due to poor promotion and minimal chart impact of the album's singles. In the United States, The Spirit Indestructible debuted at number 79, selling almost 6,000 copies in its first week, which represents a considerable drop from her previous album, Loose, which debuted at number one with 219,000 copies. In her native Canada, the album debuted at number 18 selling 2,700 copies in its first week. Furtado did not feel bad about the underwhelming performance in North America, stating that "I've had kind of everything happen to me commercially and at different levels. I've had different scenes and I've dabbled in a lot of markets so I see the music world as very global and I'm always looking for new avenues and opportunities, so one chart or anything doesn't necessarily [mean anything.]"

Internationally, The Spirit Indestructible struggled to make an impact. In Europe, the album's initial reception was mild. It became Furtado's first studio album to miss the UK top 40, entering the UK Albums Chart at number 46 on sales of 2,637 copies. The Spirit Indestructible also missed the top 40 in the Netherlands, Belgium and Spain, and charted outside the top 30 in Italy and Poland. The album was a success in Germany and Switzerland, debuting within the top five in both countries; as well as becoming a top 10 album in Austria and Czech Republic. In Asia, the album charted in the top 40 of the international South Korean album charts.

== Track listing ==
The Spirit Indestructible – Standard edition
No.	Title	Writer(s)	Producer(s)	Length
1.	"Spirit Indestructible"	Nelly Furtado; Rodney "Darkchild" Jerkins	Jerkins; Furtado^{[a]}	4:01
2.	"Big Hoops (Bigger the Better)"	Furtado; Jerkins	Jerkins	3:52
3.	"High Life" (featuring Ace Primo)	Furtado; Jerkins; Niko Khale Warren	Jerkins	4:19
4.	"Parking Lot"	Furtado; Jerkins	Jerkins	5:25
5.	"Something" (featuring Nas)	Furtado; Salaam Remi; Nasir Jones	Salaamremi.com	3:35
6.	"Bucket List"	Furtado; Jerkins	Jerkins	4:22
7.	"The Most Beautiful Thing" (featuring Sara Tavares)	Furtado; Remi; Hernst Bellevue	Salaamremi.com	3:59
8.	"Waiting for the Night"	Furtado; Jerkins	Jerkins; Furtado^{[a]}	4:28
9.	"Miracles"	Furtado; Jerkins; Andre Lindal	Jerkins; Lindal	3:26
10.	"Circles"	Furtado; Michael Angelakos; Chris Zane	Zane; Angelakos; Demacio "Demo" Castellon^{[a]}	3:51
11.	"Enemy"	Furtado; Remi	Salaamremi.com	4:18
12.	"Believers (Arab Spring)"	Furtado; Rick Nowels	Bob Rock; Nowels; Furtado	4:08
Total length:				49:44

The Spirit Indestructible – Amazon Music Germany edition (bonus track)
No.	Title	Writer(s)	Producer(s)	Length
13.	"Cry"	Furtado; Nowels	Devrim "DK" Karaoglu; Nowels; Furtado	3:50
Total length:				53:33

The Spirit Indestructible – International iTunes Store edition (bonus track)
No.	Title	Writer(s)	Producer(s)	Length
13.	"Play"	Furtado; Karaoglu; Nowels	DK; Nowels	5:21
Total length:				55:05

The Spirit Indestructible – International iTunes Store pre-order (bonus track)
No.	Title	Writer(s)	Producer(s)	Length
14.	"Big Hoops (Bigger the Better)" (Demolition Crew Remix)	Furtado; Jerkins	Jerkins	5:31
Total length:				60:36

The Spirit Indestructible – Spotify edition (bonus track)
No.	Title	Writer(s)	Producer(s)	Length
13.	"Big Hoops (Bigger the Better)" (Dancehall Remix)	Furtado; Jerkins	Jerkins	3:15
Total length:				52:59

The Spirit Indestructible – Deluxe edition (bonus tracks)
No.	Title	Writer(s)	Producer(s)	Length
13.	"Hold Up"	Furtado; Jerkins	Jerkins	4:14
14.	"End of the World"	Furtado; Nowels	Fraser T Smith; Nowels^{[a]}	3:46
15.	"Don't Leave Me"	Furtado; Stephen McGregor	Di Genius; Castellon^{[a]}	3:38
16.	"Be OK" (featuring Dylan Murray)	Murray	John Shanks	3:27
17.	"Thoughts" (featuring The Kenyan Boys Choir)	Furtado	Furtado; The Demolition Crew	2:42
18.	"Thoughts" (Tiësto Remix) (featuring The Kenyan Boys Choir)	Furtado	Furtado; The Demolition Crew; Tiësto	2:36
Total length:				69:56

The Spirit Indestructible – International deluxe edition (bonus track)
No.	Title	Writer(s)	Producer(s)	Length
19.	"End Game"	Furtado; Remi	Salaam Remi	4:32
Total length:				74:40

The Spirit Indestructible – Amazon Music Germany deluxe edition (bonus track)
No.	Title	Writer(s)	Producer(s)	Length
20.	"Cry"	Furtado; Nowels	DK; Nowels; Furtado	3:50
Total length:				78:18

The Spirit Indestructible – Japan deluxe edition (bonus tracks)
No.	Title	Writer(s)	Producer(s)	Length
20.	"Soak It Up"	Furtado; Remi	Salaam Remi	3:28
21.	"Play"	Furtado; Karaoglu; Nowels	DK; Nowels	5:21
22.	"Big Hoops (Bigger the Better)" (Demolition Crew Remix)	Furtado, Jerkins	The Demolition Crew	5:31

The Spirit Indestructible – UK deluxe edition (bonus track)
No.	Title	Writer(s)	Producer(s)	Length
20.	"Skylight"	Furtado; Remi	Salaam Remi	3:55

The Spirit Indestructible – International iTunes Store deluxe edition (bonus tracks)
No.	Title	Writer(s)	Producer(s)	Length
20.	"Play"	Furtado; Karaoglu; Nowels	DK; Nowels	5:21
21.	"Big Hoops (Bigger the Better)" (Demolition Crew Remix)	Furtado; Jerkins	Jerkins	5:31

The Spirit Indestructible – Spotify deluxe edition (bonus track)
No.	Title	Writer(s)	Producer(s)	Length
20.	"Big Hoops (Bigger the Better)" (Dancehall Remix)	Furtado; Jerkins	Jerkins	3:15

Notes

- ^{^a} signifies a vocal producer

== Personnel ==
Credits for the digital deluxe edition of The Spirit Indestructible.

- Nelly Furtado – vocals, backing vocals, songwriter, backing vocal producer, mixing, producer, vocal producer
- Brian Allison – bass
- Rusty Anderson – electric guitar
- Michael Angelakos – backing vocals, producer
- Keith Armstrong – assistant engineer
- Beatriz Artola – additional vocal engineer, engineer
- Hernst Bellevue – additional keyboards
- Roy Bittan – accordion
- Paul Bushnell – bass
- Brandon N. Caddell – assistant engineer
- Karl Campbell – additional clapping
- Demacio "Demo" Castellon – drums, engineer, keyboards, mixing, vocal engineer, vocal producer
- Matt Champlin – engineer, mixing
- Alan Chang – keyboards, synth strings
- Dan Chase – additional engineer, programming
- Chris Smith Management – management
- LaShawn Daniels – additional backing vocals
- The Demolition Crew – additional drum programming, additional programming, producer, remix
- Di Genius – engineer, instruments, producer
- Gleyder "Gee" Disla – engineer, mixing
- Jason "Metal" Donkersgoed – assistant engineer
- Jamie Edwards – electric guitar, keyboards
- Lars Fox – Pro Tools editing
- Lazonate Franklin – additional backing vocals
- Josh Freese – drums, programming
- António José Furtado – voice
- Chris Gehringer – mastering
- Brad Haehnel – mixing
- Eric Helmkamp – engineer
- Vincent Henry – guitar, saxophone
- Rodney Jerkins – mixing, producer, vocal producer
- Charles Judge – keyboards, synth strings
- Solomon Kabiru – Kenyan Boys Choir soloist
- Devrim Karaoĝlu – drums, keyboards, mixing, producer, programming, strings
- Nik Karpen – assistant engineer
- Sean Kelly – guitar
- Kenyan Boys Choir – vocals
- Andre Lindal – producer
- Chris Lord-Alge – mixing
- Kim Lumpkin – production coordinator
- Thomas Lumpkins – additional backing vocals
- Manny Marroquin – mixing
- Kieron Menzies – engineer, mixing
- Alex Moore – additional backing vocals
- Mogollon – art direction
- Greg Morgan – additional drum programming, sound designer
- Dylan Murray – vocals
- Nas – rap
- Peter Ndung'u – hand drums
- Nevis – artwork additional
- Cliff Njora – nyatiti
- Rick Nowels – acoustic guitar, keyboards, producer, vocal engineer, vocal producer
- Jeanette Olsson – backing vocals
- Thom Panunzio – A&R, vocals
- Brent Paschke – guitar
- Erich Preston – engineer
- Niko Khale Warren a.k.a. Ace Primo – backing vocals, rap
- Andrés Recio – Lisbon production coordinator
- Dean Reid – drums, engineer, programming
- Salaam Remi – arrangement, bass, drums, guitar, keyboards, producer
- Bob Rock – producer
- Jeff Rothschild – additional drums, engineer, programming
- Mary Rozzi – photography
- Irene Salazar – additional backing vocals
- Jeianna Salazar – additional backing vocals
- Judah Salazar – additional backing vocals
- Sariah Salazar – additional backing vocals
- Andrew Schubert – additional mix engineer
- Keith Scott – guitar
- John Shanks – bass, guitar, keyboards, producer
- Joel Shearer – guitar
- Marco Sipriano – engineer
- Chris "Governor" Smith – vocals
- Fraser T Smith – bass, engineer, guitar, keyboards, mixing, producer
- Ash Soan – drums, percussion
- Franklin Socorro – engineer
- Jordan Stillwell – engineer
- Shari Sutcliffe – musician contracting
- Sara Tavares – backing vocals
- Tiësto – additional producer, remix
- Brad Townsend – additional mix engineer
- Michael Turco – drums, engineer, keyboards
- Jeanne Venton – A&R administration
- Orlando Vitto – engineer
- Henry Wanjala – Kenyan Boys Choir vocal arrangement, shaker, Swahili translation
- Tony-Kaya Whitney – voice
- Chris Zane – producer
- Ianthe Zevos – creative director

== Charts ==
Chart performance for The Spirit Indestructible
Chart (2012)	Peak position
Austrian Albums (Ö3 Austria)	8
Belgian Albums (Ultratop Flanders)	79
Belgian Albums (Ultratop Wallonia)	44
Canadian Albums (Billboard)	18
Czech Albums (ČNS IFPI)	26
Dutch Albums (Album Top 100)	41
German Albums (Offizielle Top 100)	3
Italian Albums (FIMI)	36
Mexican Albums (Top 100 Mexico)	81
Polish Albums (ZPAV)	31
Scottish Albums (Official Charts)	75
South Korean International Albums (Gaon)	33
Spanish Albums (Promusicae)	58
Swiss Albums (Schweizer Hitparade)	3
UK Albums (Official Charts)	46
US Billboard 200	79

== Release history ==
Release history and formats for The Spirit Indestructible
Region	Date	Label	Ref(s)
Australia	September 14, 2012	Universal Music	
Germany	September 14, 2012	Universal Music	
United Kingdom	September 17, 2012	Polydor	
United States	September 18, 2012	Mosley Music Group; Interscope	
Canada	September 18, 2012	Universal Music	
Japan	September 19, 2012	Universal Music	
