= Spirit Indestructible =

Single by Nelly Furtado

from the album The Spirit Indestructible
- Released: July 20, 2012
- Recorded: 2012
- Studio: 2nd Floor Studios (California)
- Length: 4:01 (main version); 3:55 (radio edit)
- Label: Interscope, MMG
- Songwriters: Nelly Furtado; Rodney Jerkins
- Producer: Rodney "Darkchild" Jerkins

Nelly Furtado singles chronology
"Big Hoops (Bigger the Better)" (2012)	"Spirit Indestructible" (2012)	"Parking Lot" (2012)

Music video
- "Spirit Indestructible" on YouTube

"Spirit Indestructible" is a song by Canadian recording artist Nelly Furtado. The song was released on July 31, 2012, as the second single from her fifth studio album, The Spirit Indestructible. The song was written by Furtado and co-written and produced by Rodney "Darkchild" Jerkins.

Lyrically, it has a positive and upbeat message — about having a spirit that is indestructible and unbreakable, along with a heart that's pure and a body that's a miracle. The song received mixed reviews from music critics, some praised the "epic chorus" and the uplifting lyrics, but others felt that the song was a "mess" and a strange choice of single.

The music video was shot on Vancouver's scenic Grouse Mountain and captures the song's empowering and spiritual message, featuring snow-capped mountains and beach bonfires, as well as Furtado performing in a theater alongside a kid playing on a miniature piano. The song performed modestly on the charts, reaching the top forty in Germany, Slovakia and Switzerland.

Furtado performed the song at the 2025 Invictus Games in Vancouver.

== Background and release ==
"Spirit Indestructible" is the first song Furtado and Darkchild recorded together at 2nd Floor Studio in California. In an interview she has described the song as "a tribute to the humanity" and "how strong our spirits are." Her trip to Kenya, as an ambassador for charity Free The Children, helped her to write the song. She also recorded a Spanglish version of the song, titled "Espíritu Invencible". The song was released via digital download in Europe on July 31, 2012, in Germany on August 3, and on August 14, 2012, in the U.S. Digital Amazon store.

== Composition ==
"Spirit Indestructible" was written by Furtado and co-written and produced by Rodney "Darkchild" Jerkins. The song features Freestyle influences, in the same style of lead single "Big Hoops (Bigger the Better)". The song starts out with a piano introduction and then Nelly starts singing the first verse: "Through my one square foot window, I can see outside / I have chains on my feet, but not in my mind." After the first chorus, a driving drum beat enters as the second verse is sung. The post chorus features a military-drum breakdown, with Furtado singing 'AEIOU'. Speaking about the song, Furtado says: "It's an ode to the spirit which resides in all of us and triumphs over anything". "It is inspired by people I have met, and special moments in history that I have read about."

== Critical reception ==
The song received mostly mixed reviews from music critics. Katharine St. Asaph of Pop Dust gave the song 3 out of 5 stars, commenting, "You end up wishing the entire song was like the second half–the lyrics are the same, so it's no less inspirational, and it's more inspiring anyway to move than to wonder whether you're listening to a half-finished demo, where the producers fleshed out Nelly's voice but didn't get around to half the instruments yet. It's probably too disjointed for radio play, and it's a strange choice of single even with Darkchild producing again." Nolan Feenay from Entertainment Weekly's Music Mix wrote that "the song has a chorus as epic and uplifting as you'd expect with a new-age title like that." However, he called it "a Frankenstein of musical styles. The opening keyboard recalls the intro to Lady Gaga's 'Marry the Night,' and the Timbaland-esque beat that kicks in later sounds like a rhythmic repeat of their 2006 hit 'Promiscuous'. Now throw in a vowel-chanting breakdown, a cinematic war cry of a bridge, and some guitar for the heck of it? Woah, Nelly. That's a lot of song you've got there."

Becky Bain of Idolator commented: "Oddly, there's something totally 80s about whatever's going on in this hot mess of a song. It needs a lot more work to make the whole thing mesh together. And we know Nelly has always been a bit nasal, but here she just sounds like she's whining."

== Commercial performance ==
"Spirit Indestructible" debuted at number 41 on the Ö3 Austria Top 75 chart. Later, the song fell to number 44, but jumped to number 42, in its third week. In Germany, the song peaked at number 23 on the Media Control AG chart. In Switzerland, the song reached number 32 on the Schweizer Hitparade.

== Music video ==
A lyric video was released before the official video. The video is about Spencer West, a paraplegic who climbed Mount Kilimanjaro using only his hands. The official music video for "Spirit Indestructible" was filmed on June 15, 2012, at Grouse Mountain in North Vancouver, British Columbia, Canada. On July 13, 2012, Furtado uploaded via her YouTube account, a behind-the-scenes video. The video was directed by Aaron A, who worked on her video, "Bajo Otra Luz". The video premiered on July 18, 2012, on VEVO. The video begins with Furtado singing in a stage accompanied by a young boy playing a piano and when the beat of music starts, Furtado suddenly is on a mountain, where she twirls around while conjuring up her own unbeatable inner strength. Furtado then leads a crew of men to a beach for a spiritual drum circle session and a dance around a bonfire. The second part of the video shows her walking with drummers on the beach and dancing on a mountain and behind the blue sky wearing a golden dress. In the final shot, the snow has melted, and Furtado turns to dust and is at one with nature.

== Track listing ==
- Digital download
1. "Spirit Indestructible" – 4:01
- Germany digital download
1. "Spirit Indestructible" (radio edit) – 3:35
2. "Spirit Indestructible" (acoustic) – 3:55
3. "Spirit Indestructible" (music video) – 4:18
- UK digital download
1. "Spirit Indestructible" – 4:01
2. "Spirit Indestructible" (radio edit) – 3:35
3. "Spirit Indestructible" (acoustic) – 3:55
4. "Big Hoops (Bigger the Better)" (Wideboys Remix)
5. "Big Hoops (Bigger the Better)" (Michael Woods Remix)
- Germany CD single
1. "Spirit Indestructible" (radio edit) – 3:35
2. "Spirit Indestructible" (acoustic) – 3:55

== Credits and personnel ==
Credits are adapted from The Spirit Indestructible album liner notes.

Technical

- Recorded and mixed at 2nd Floor Studios, Hollywood, California.

Personnel

- Nelly Furtado — lyrics, vocal production, lead and background vocals, mixing
- Rodney "Darkchild" Jerkins — music, production, vocal production, mixing
- Brent Paschke — guitar
- Greg Morgan — sound design
- Matt Champlin — recording, mixing
- Orlando Vitto — recording
- Brandon N. Caddell — engineering assistance

== Chart performance ==
Chart (2012)	Peak position
Austria (Ö3 Austria Top 40)	41
Belgium (Ultratip Bubbling Under Flanders)	75
CIS Airplay (TopHit)	114
Germany (GfK)	23
Japan (Japan Hot 100)	79
Netherlands (Dutch Top 40 Tipparade)	20
Slovakia Airplay (ČNS IFPI)	10
Switzerland (Schweizer Hitparade)	32

== Release history ==
Release dates and formats for "Spirit Indestructible"
Region	Date	Format	Label	Ref.
Italy	July 20, 2012	Radio airplay	Universal	
DACH	August 3, 2012	CD single	Universal	
United Kingdom	September 23, 2012	Digital download	Polydor	
