= Big Hoops (Bigger the Better) =

Single by music recording artist Nelly Furtado

Single by Nelly Furtado

from the album The Spirit Indestructible
- B-side: "Something"
- Released: April 16, 2012
- Recorded: 2012
- Studio: 2nd Floor Studios, Los Angeles, California
- Length: 3:52
- Label: Interscope; MMG
- Songwriters: Nelly Furtado; Rodney Jerkins
- Producer: Rodney "Darkchild" Jerkins

Nelly Furtado singles chronology
| "Is Anybody Out There?" (2012) | "Big Hoops (Bigger the Better)" (2012) | "Spirit Indestructible" (2012) |

Music video
- "Big Hoops (Bigger the Better)" on YouTube

"Big Hoops (Bigger the Better)" is a song by Canadian recording artist Nelly Furtado, taken from her fifth studio album, The Spirit Indestructible. It was released on April 16, 2012, through Interscope Records, as the lead single from the album. The song was written by Furtado in a collaboration with its producer Rodney "Darkchild" Jerkins. "Big Hoops (Bigger the Better)" is an R&B song influenced by hip hop collective Odd Future and 1990s productions. The track's lyrics refer to the singer's life as a teenager, describing her passion for hip hop and R&B music at that time. "Big Hoops (Bigger the Better)" received mixed to positive reviews from music critics, who praised the song's breakdown but criticized Furtado's vocals, likening them to Rihanna.

The song achieved moderate commercial success, reaching the top 30 in Canada, the Netherlands and the United Kingdom. In the United States, "Big Hoops (Bigger the Better)" failed to enter the Billboard Hot 100; however, it charted within the top 40 on Pop Songs and reached the top 10 on Hot Dance Club Songs. The accompanying music video was directed by Little X, and features Furtado strutting down a city block wearing a giant pair of stilts, as she is joined by Native American dancers throughout the video. To promote the song, Furtado performed it on Alan Carr: Chatty Man, at the 2012 Billboard Music Awards and the 2012 MuchMusic Video Awards.

In 2021, "Big Hoops (Bigger the Better)" was interpolated in the dance track "Talk About" by Rain Radio and DJ Craig Gorman, which reached the top 10 on the UK Singles Chart and was certified platinum by the British Phonographic Industry.

== Background ==
I'm channelling my 14-year-old self because I used to put on these big hoop earrings and big jeans and backpack and go down and hang out in front of the mall and wait for my friends.

— Nelly Furtado talking about the song.

"Big Hoops (Bigger the Better)" was one of the first songs that Furtado worked on with producer Rodney Jerkins for The Spirit Indestructible. The singer stated that the song's instrumentation was influenced by the 1990s hip hop and R&B as a tribute to the music she listened to in her teenage years, also citing inspiration from hip hop group Odd Future's "dark sound[ing], heavy and visceral" sound as she tried to recreate a similar style on "Big Hoops (Bigger the Better)".

The lyrics of "Big Hoops (Bigger the Better)" also concern Furtado's teenage period, with the singer describing the song's lyrical content as "my swagger-in-spades, rhyme-writing 14-year-old self find[ing] liberation through hip hop and R&B attending 'music jams' in suburban Victoria". There are references to Furtado's favourite groups at the period — such as Salt-n-Pepa, A Tribe Called Quest and Blackstreet, many of whom were produced by Jerkins himself — and her teenage wardrobe. The song's title references the hoop earrings she liked to wear. Furtado said that the song describes "a certain unique swagger you have at that young age and that the music gives you," and that she was "the kid who used to pick up the mic at parties and just rock the crowd, sing my way through the storm and know my voice could penetrate." The singer stated that as "hip-hop was super-exotic to us in Canada", she felt that "it was very liberating, finding that confidence through the music".

== Composition ==
"Big Hoops (Bigger the Better)" (2012)
A sample of "Big Hoops", where Furtado sings about having fun in a night, over hip hop beats and staccato percussion.

"Big Hoops (Bigger the Better)" was written by Furtado, with production and additional writing being provided by Jerkins. The song features staccato percussion. Robbie Daw of Idolator noticed the use of pitch-correcting software Auto-Tune on Furtado's voice.

Furtado's manager Chris Smith stated that "Big Hoops" was an attempt to translate Furtado's versatility as "a free-range artist", being "free form; not contained versus a structured typical song." As an in-joke to Smith's reaction to when he first heard the track, the song starts with the manager saying "Time release the fresh", Furtado laughing at the phrase, and Interscope Records A&R representative Thom Panunzio replying "You're 100 percent right Chris." The title and intro, during which Furtado chants "the bigger the better" against a bass line, references the character finding strength in the size of her earrings.

== Release and reception ==
Smith declared that "Big Hoops (Bigger the Better)" was not originally intended as a single, only "a big club banger", as he and Furtado felt the track's status as "a song that would be the best of Nelly, Nelly's attitude, Nelly's freshness" would not be "really about chart positions". Eventually it became the lead single for The Spirit Indestructible. Furtado stated that the song earned this status because it represented her intentions "to detach myself from all shackles and play freely" as her ambitious younger self was always "pushing the boundaries". It was released via digital download on April 17, 2012, and was released physically in Germany on May 18, 2012.

=== Critical reception ===
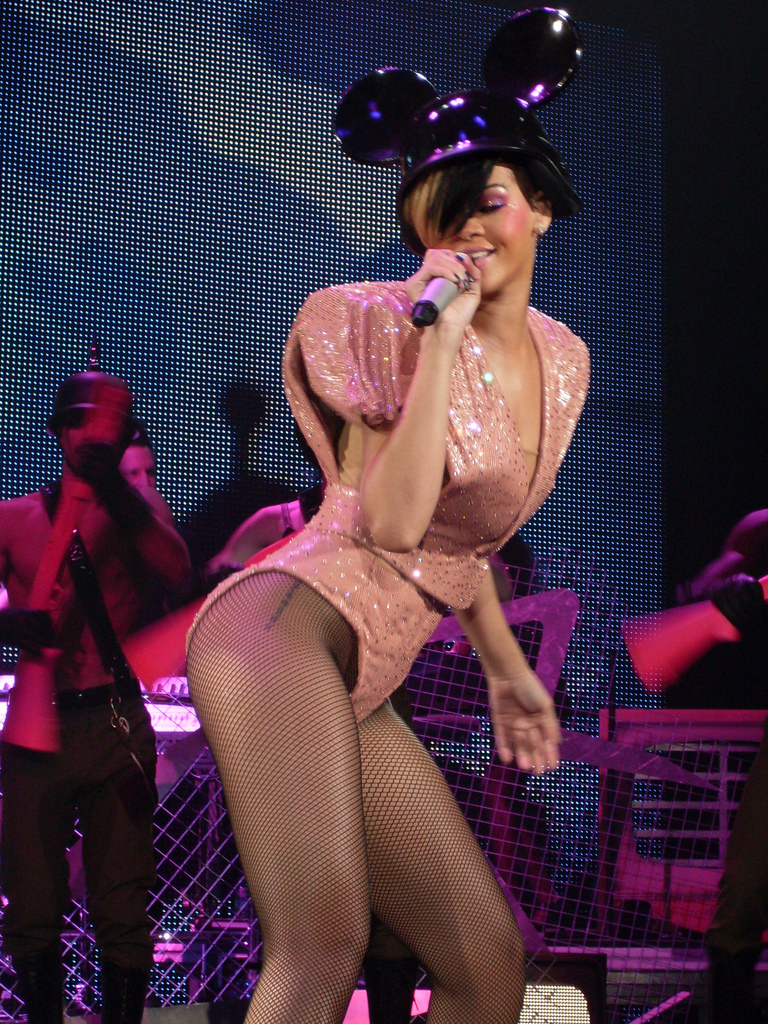
Critics compared Furtado's vocals to those of recording artist Rihanna.

"Big Hoops (Bigger the Better)" has received mixed to favourable reviews from music critics, some of whom compared the vocals on the song to those of Rihanna in songs like "Rude Boy" and "Cheers (Drink to That)". Billboard's Maria Sherman wrote that "Big Hoops" is "easily in the running to be one of the best summer club anthems of the year", and "if this song doesn't roll out the carpet for her comeback, nothing will." MTV reviewer Jenna Hally Rubenstein praised Jerkins' production and the song's originality, considering that "Big Hoops" was "unlike anything you've heard in a hot minute".

Robbie Daw of Idolator, gave the song a mixed review, criticizing the singer's "unnecessary Rihanna-esque vocal delivery" while adding that it "isn't the strongest lead single we've heard from an album." Jessica Sager of Pop Crush rated it 0.5 out of 5 stars, comparing Furtado's vocals to the ones of a "child wailing through a cardboard tube." She also wrote that "Sager also noted that the singer "wants to depart from Loose as well, but she doesn't have anything to say beyond getting dressed and having a guy ignore her" and concluded that "the song is more irritating than catchy, and the beat isn't strong enough to make many people dance." Melinda Newman of HitFix deemed the song "It's a meaningless little ditty that is all about the military beat and bragging rights. It doesn't have enough of a hook to work its way up the radio charts, but will likely do very well in the clubs."

=== Chart performance ===
"Big Hoops (Bigger the Better)" debuted at number 60 on the Canadian Hot 100 chart and peaked at number 28. It debuted at number 46 on the Belgian Tip Chart, where it reached a peak of number 24. On the Dutch singles chart, the track debuted at number 81 and peaked at 26. On the UK Singles Chart, "Big Hoops (Bigger the Better)" debuted at number 14, becoming Furtado's highest-charting single since 2006's All Good Things (Come to an End). On the North American Billboard charts, the song became Furtado's first since 2010's "Night Is Young" to not enter the Billboard Hot 100. However, "Big Hoops (Bigger the Better)" reached the top 40 of the Pop Songs chart and the top 10 of the Hot Dance Club Songs chart. Smith felt the underperformance was helped by moving The Spirit Indestructible's release date, "so there's no need to get this thing that supposed to be this club banger intro track and force it up the chart."

== Music video ==
A still from the video, where Furtado is seen walking down a city block wearing a giant pair of stilts.

The accompanying music video for "Big Hoops (Bigger the Better)" was directed by Little X, who previously worked with Furtado on the video for "Promiscuous". The video premiered on May 3, 2012, in Much Music, and on May 7, 2012, on VEVO.

The video opens with Furtado strolling down a city block wearing a giant pair of stilts. After several outfit changes, Furtado is seen accompanied by Native American hoop dancers, including champion hoop dancer Tony Duncan. The dancers create shapes with their hoops as a giant Furtado towers over the cityscape.

Becky Bain of Idolator wrote that "the singer struts down a city street in a pair of stilts, exuding the most swag we've ever seen from someone nearly 12 feet tall. Eventually, Nelly grows to Godzilla-esque proportions – and so does her jewelry. Those really are some big hoops." Jenna Rubenstein of MTV News wrote that "Nelly's 'Big Hoops' video is totally weird and makes no sense. Do we care? No. Because any gal that can look that hot while on stilts deserves our full respect."

Two alternate videos were produced: a "lyrics" video and a "Home Made" video, directed by Aaron A and filmed in a parking lot on Sunset Boulevard during the production of The Spirit Indestructible's album artwork.

== Live performances ==
In May 2012, Furtado performed "Big Hoops" on UK show Alan Carr: Chatty Man. Furtado performed the song for the first time in the United States during the 2012 Billboard Music Awards on May 20, 2012, and in Canada during the 2012 MuchMusic Video Awards on June 17, 2012. It is part of her setlist on The Spirit Indestructible Tour, which started in January 2013.

== Formats and track listings ==
- Digital download
1. "Big Hoops (Bigger the Better)" – 3:52
- UK digital download - EP
1. "Big Hoops (Bigger the Better)" – 3:52
2. "Something" (featuring Nas) – 3:29
3. "Big Hoops (Bigger the Better)" (extended version) – 5:52
4. "Big Hoops (Bigger the Better)" (instrumental) – 3:41
- Germany digital download - Remixes EP
1. "Big Hoops (Bigger the Better)" (radio edit) – 3:35
2. "Big Hoops (Bigger the Better)" (extended version) – 5:52
3. "Big Hoops (Bigger the Better)" (darkchild jungle club mix) – 5:47
4. "Big Hoops (Bigger the Better)" (instrumental) – 3:41
- Germany CD single
1. "Big Hoops (Bigger the Better)" (radio edit) – 3:35
2. "Big Hoops (Bigger the Better)" (extended version) – 5:52

== Credits and personnel ==
Credits are adapted from The Spirit Indestructible album liner notes. Technical

- Recorded and mixed at 2nd Floor Studios, Hollywood, California.

Personnel

- Nelly Furtado – lyrics, lead and background vocals
- Rodney "Darkchild" Jerkins – music, production, vocal production, mixing
- Thom Panunzio – vocals
- Chris "Governor" Smith – vocals
- Greg Morgan – sound design
- Matt Champlin – recording, mixing
- Orlando Vitto – recording
- Brandon N. Caddell – engineering assistance

== Charts ==
Chart performance for "Big Hoops (Bigger the Better)"
| Chart (2012) | Peak position |
|---|---|
| Belgium (Ultratip Bubbling Under Flanders) | 5 |
| Belgium (Ultratip Bubbling Under Wallonia) | 8 |
| Canada Hot 100 (Billboard) | 28 |
| Canada CHR/Top 40 (Billboard) | 18 |
| Canada Hot AC (Billboard) | 31 |
| Germany (GfK) | 41 |
| Lebanon (The Official Lebanese Top 20) | 20 |
| Netherlands (Dutch Top 40) | 26 |
| Netherlands (Single Top 100) | 46 |
| Scotland Singles (OCC) | 22 |
| UK Singles (OCC) | 14 |
| US Pop Airplay (Billboard) | 40 |
| US Dance Club Songs (Billboard) | 6 |

== Certifications ==
Certifications for "Big Hoops (Bigger the Better)"
| Region | Certification | Certified units/sales |
|---|---|---|
| Canada (Music Canada) | Gold | 5,000^{^} |
^{^} Shipments figures based on certification alone.

== Release history ==
Release dates and formats for "Big Hoops (Bigger the Better)"
| Region | Date | Format | Label | Ref. |
|---|---|---|---|---|
| France | April 16, 2012 | Radio airplay | UMG | |
| Italy | April 16, 2012 | Radio airplay | UMG | |
| Various (Excluding Germany and UK) | April 17, 2012 | Digital download | UMG | |
| North America | May 1, 2012 | Top 40/Mainstream and Rhythmic radio | UMG | |
| Germany | May 18, 2012 | CD single | UMG | |
| United Kingdom | June 3, 2012 | Digital download | UMG | |
| United States | June 12, 2012 | Digital download (The Remixes – Part 1) | UMG | |
| United States | June 19, 2012 | Digital download (The Remixes – Part 2) | UMG | |
