= St. Francis of Assisi Church =

St. Francis of Assisi Church or Church of St. Francis of Assisi may refer to:

== Aruba ==
- St. Francis of Assisi Church, Oranjestad

== Australia ==
- St Francis of Assisi Catholic Church, Paddington, New South Wales

== Austria ==
- St. Francis of Assisi Church, Vienna

== Brazil ==
- Church of Saint Francis of Assisi (Ouro Preto)
- Church of Saint Francis of Assisi, Pampulha
- Church of Saint Francis of Assisi (São João del-Rei)

== India ==
- Church and Convent of St. Francis of Assisi, Goa
- Church of St. Francis of Assisi, Farangipet, Karnataka

== Malta ==
- Church of St Francis of Assisi, Ħamrun
- St Francis of Assisi Church, Valletta

== Philippines ==
- Parish Church of St. Francis of Assisi, Bulacan
- St. Francis of Assisi Parish Church (General Trias), Cavite
- Saint Francis of Assisi Parish Church (Sariaya), Quezon

== Poland ==
- Church of St. Francis of Assisi, Kraków

== Puerto Rico ==
- Church of Saint Francis of Assisi, San Juan

== Slovakia ==
- Church of Saint-Francis of Assisi, Hervartov

== Syria ==
- Church of Saint Francis of Assisi, Aleppo

== United Arab Emirates ==
- St. Francis of Assisi Catholic Church, Jebel Ali, Dubai

== United Kingdom ==
- St Francis of Assisi, Bedworth, Warwickshire, England
- St Francis of Assisi's Church, Bournemouth, Dorset, England
- St Francis of Assisi's Church, Bournville, Birmingham, England
- St Francis of Assisi Church, Handsworth, Birmingham, England
- St Francis of Assisi Church, Notting Hill, London, England
- St Francis of Assisi Church, Shefford, Bedfordshire, England
- St Francis of Assisi Church, Stratford, London, England

== United States ==
- St. Francis of Assisi Church (Manhattan), New York
- St. Francis of Assisi Catholic Church (New Orleans, Louisiana)
- St. Francis of Assisi Catholic Church (Jefferson, North Carolina)
- Saint Francis of Assisi Church (San Francisco, California)
- San Francisco de Asís Mission Church (Ranchos de Taos, New Mexico)

== Uruguay ==
- Parroquia San Francisco de Asís, Montevideo

== See also ==
- Saint Francis of Assisi Cathedral (disambiguation)
- Cathedral Basilica of St. Francis of Assisi (Santa Fe), New Mexico, United States
- Church of St. Francis of Assisi and St. Blaise (Brooklyn), New York, United States
- Proto-Cathedral St. Francis of Assisi, Aden, Yemen, also known as the Church of St. Francis
- Church of San Francisco de Asís (disambiguation)
- St Francis' Church (disambiguation), including Church of St. Francis
- Church of San Francesco (disambiguation)
- Church of San Francisco (disambiguation)
