= St. Francis Cathedral =

St. Francis Cathedral may refer to:

- St. Francis Xavier Cathedral (disambiguation)
- Cathedral of St. Francis de Sales (disambiguation)
- Saint Francis of Assisi Cathedral (disambiguation)

== See also ==
- St. Francis Church (disambiguation)
