= San Francesco d'Assisi =

San Francesco d'Assisi may refer to:

- San Francesco d'Assisi, Alcamo
- San Francesco D'Assisi, Calascibetta
- San Francesco d'Assisi, Enna
- San Francesco d'Assisi, Lecco
- San Francesco d'Assisi, Oria
- San Francesco d'Assisi, Palermo
- San Francesco d'Assisi, Turin
- San Francesco d'Assisi ad Acilia
- San Francesco d'Assisi all'Immacolata, Catania

== See also ==
- Francis of Assisi
- Stadio San Francesco d'Assisi
- San Francesco (disambiguation)
- Saint Francis of Assisi (disambiguation)
- Francesco d'Assisi, Gela
