= St. Francis' Church =

St. Francis' Church may refer to:

- St Francis' Church, Melbourne, Australia
- St Francis' Church, Chester, Cheshire, Great Britain
- St. Francis Church, Kochi, Cochin, Kerala, India
- St. Francis Church (Hoboken, New Jersey), United States

== See also ==
- Cathedral of St. Francis de Sales (disambiguation)
- Friary Church of St Francis and St Anthony, Crawley, West Sussex, Great Britain
- St. Francis Chapel (Colonie, New York), United States
- Church of San Francisco (disambiguation)
- Templo de San Francisco de Asís, Guadalajara, Mexico
- São Francisco Church and Convent, Salvador, Brazil
- Saint Francis de Sales church (disambiguation)
- Saint Francis of Assisi Cathedral (disambiguation)
- St. Francis of Assisi Church (disambiguation)
- St. Francis Xavier Church (disambiguation)
- San Francisco Cathedral (disambiguation)
- Church of São Francisco (Porto), Portugal
