= Santa Maria della Catena, Calascibetta =

Baroque Roman Catholic church

Coordinates: 37.°N 14.°E

Santa Maria della Catena is a Roman Catholic church located on Via Conte Ruggero in the town of Calascibetta, in the region of Sicily, Italy.

== History and description ==
The site once held a synagogue (previously described as a meschita or mosque); but in Sicily, under Spanish rule at the time, the Alhambra Decree dictated the expulsion or conversion of the Jews. Under these circumstances, the property was acquired from the Jewish owners by the aristocrat Bernardo Andrea Grimaldi from Enna. However, soon thereafter local towns people bought the property and reconsecrated it as a church. The portal, made in a baroque style, was added only in the 1930s. The bell-tower was added by the 1600.
