= San Pietro e Santa Maria Maggiore, Calascibetta =

Church in Sicily, Italy

Coordinates: 37.°N 14.°E

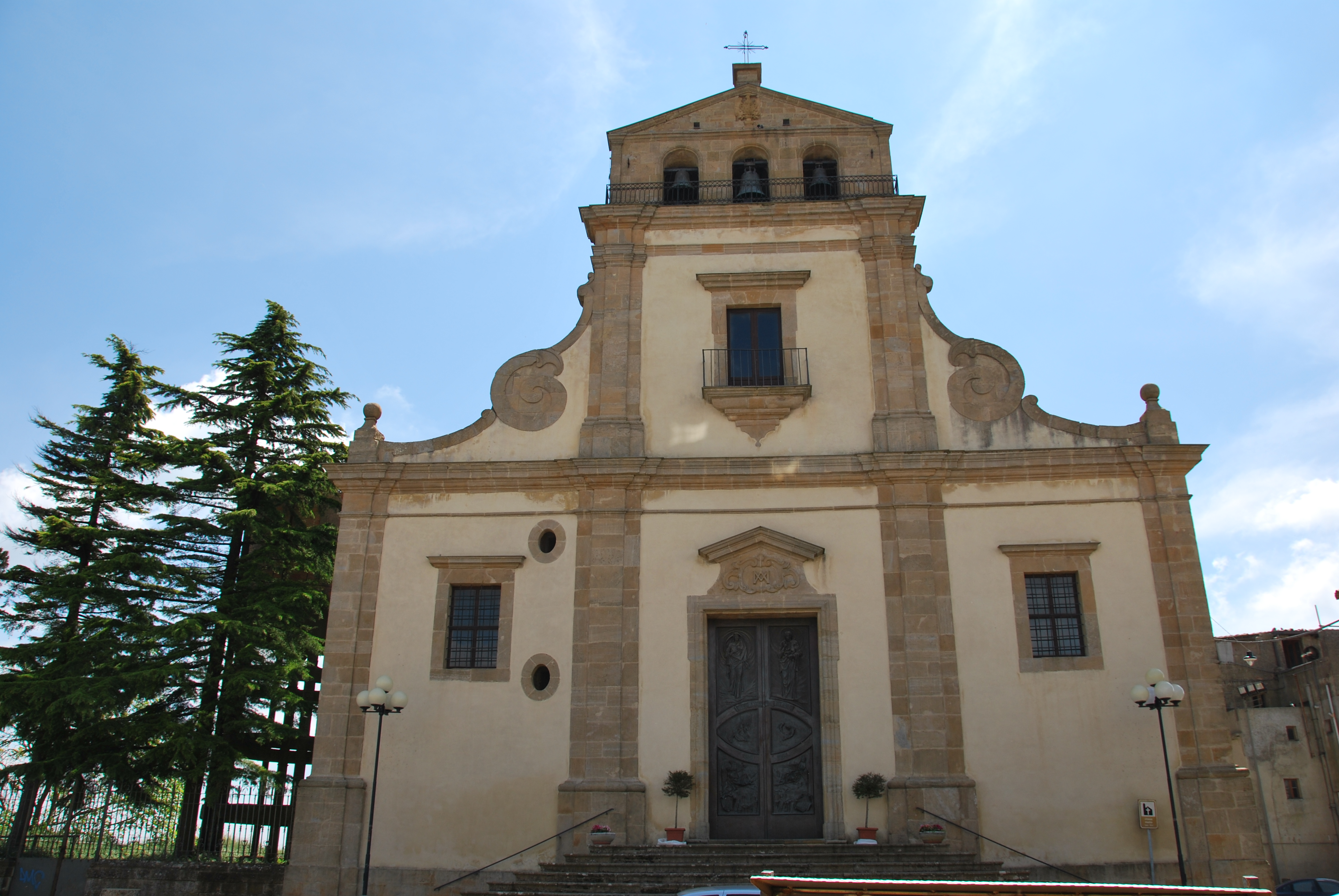
Facade of church

San Pietro e Santa Maria Maggiore is the Roman Catholic "mother church", or chiesa madre and also called Duomo, located in Piazza Madrize in the town of Calascibetta, in the region of Sicily, Italy.

== History ==
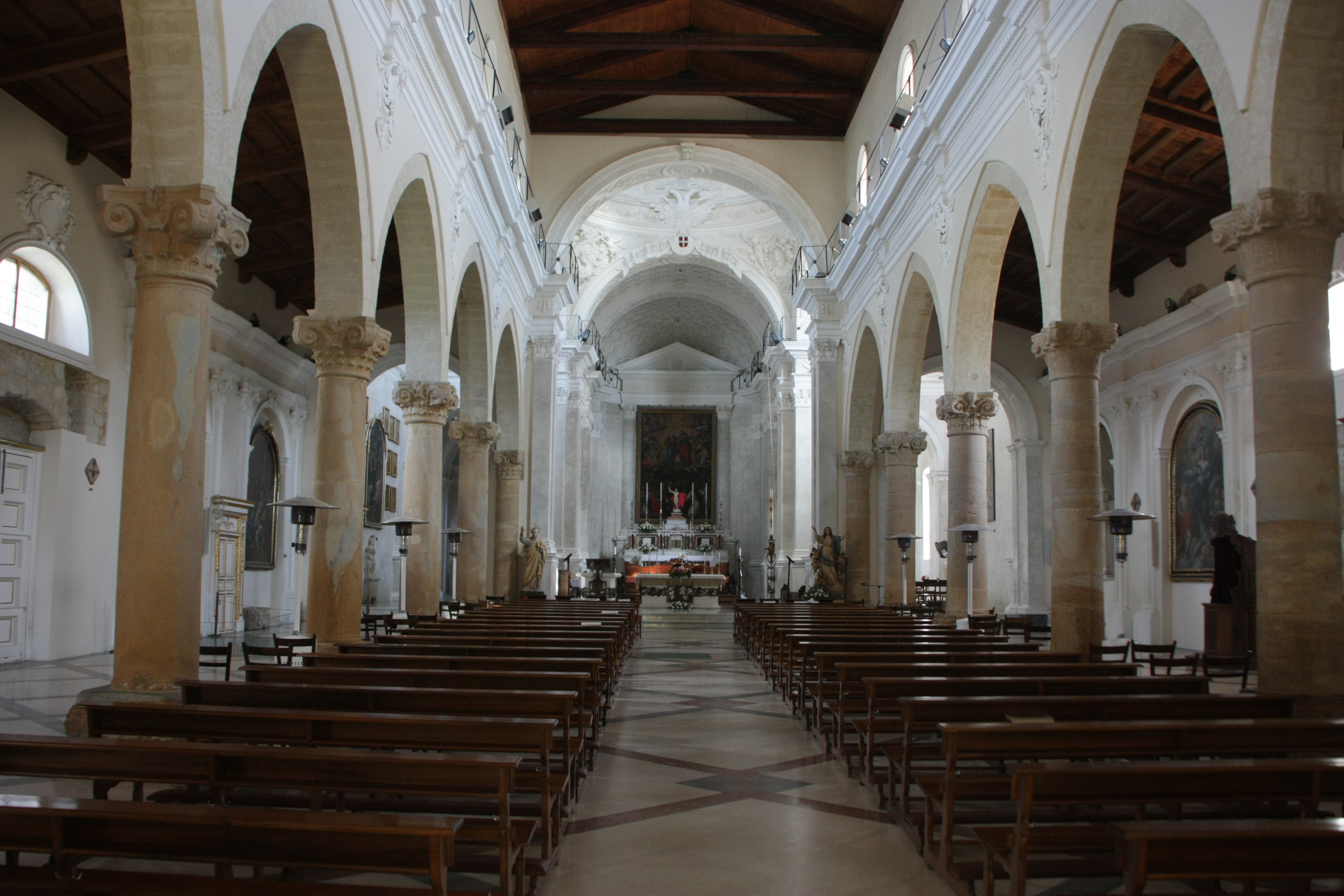
detail of nave

The first church of Santa Maria Maggiore was built by 1340 atop the ruins of a castle under the patronage of King Peter II of Aragon. Two years later it was named a Royal Palatine Chapel. Refurbished over the centuries, it has a basilica layout with a central nave and two aisles. The facade is simple, articulated with stone pilasters, and the center bell tower linked to aisles by volutes. Along the nave, Romanesque-style sculpted figures decorate the bases of the columns, including sphinxes and hawks. The arches have an ogival Gothic-style. The interior contains a marble ciborium by the school of the Gagini. Some of the altarpieces are by the early 17th-century painter Gianforte La Manna.
