= San Francisco de Asís =

San Francisco de Asís (English: Saint Francis of Assisi) may refer to:

- Church of San Francisco de Asís (Aguada), Puerto Rico
- San Francisco de Asís, Atotonilco El Alto, Mexico
- San Francisco de Asís District, Peru
- San Francisco de Asís de Yarusyacán District, Peru
- San Francisco de Asís Parish (Apaxco), Mexico
- San Francisco de Asís Parish (Coacalco de Berriozábal), Mexico
- Iglesia de San Francisco de Asis (San José, Costa Rica)
- Iglesia de San Francisco de Asís (Santa Cruz de Tenerife), Spain
- Parroquia San Francisco de Asís, Montevideo, Uruguay
- Mission San Francisco de Asís, California, United States
- San Francisco de Asís Mission Church Nuevo Mexico, United States
- San Francisco de Asís (Almirante Brown), in Almirante Brown Department, Argentina
- Saint Francis of Assisi (film), a 1944 Mexican historical drama film

== See also ==
- Saint Francis of Assisi (disambiguation)
