= San Francisco, Old San Juan =

Subbarrio of San Juan Antiguo in Puerto Rico

San Francisco
- Subbarrio
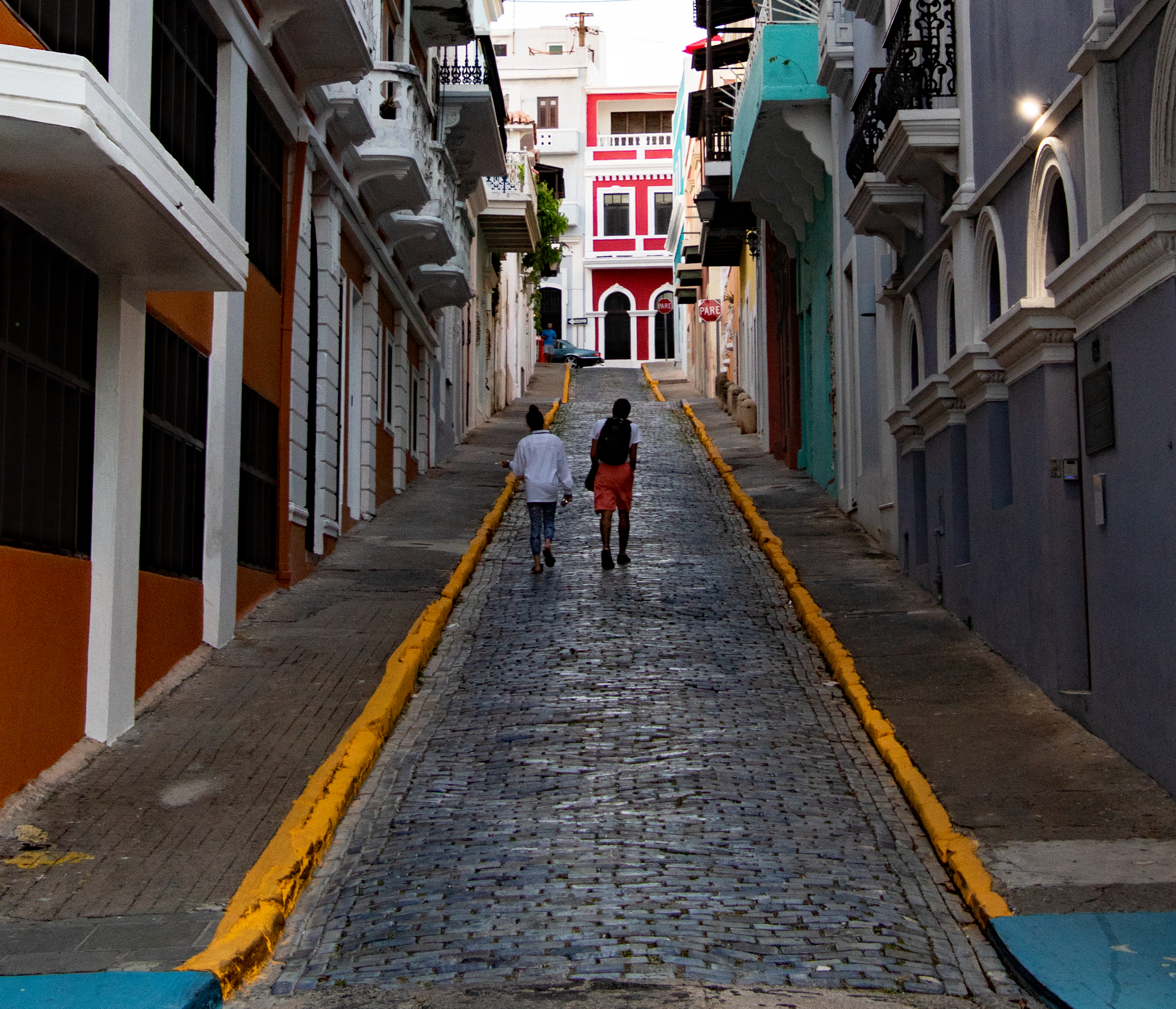
- Hill in San Francisco

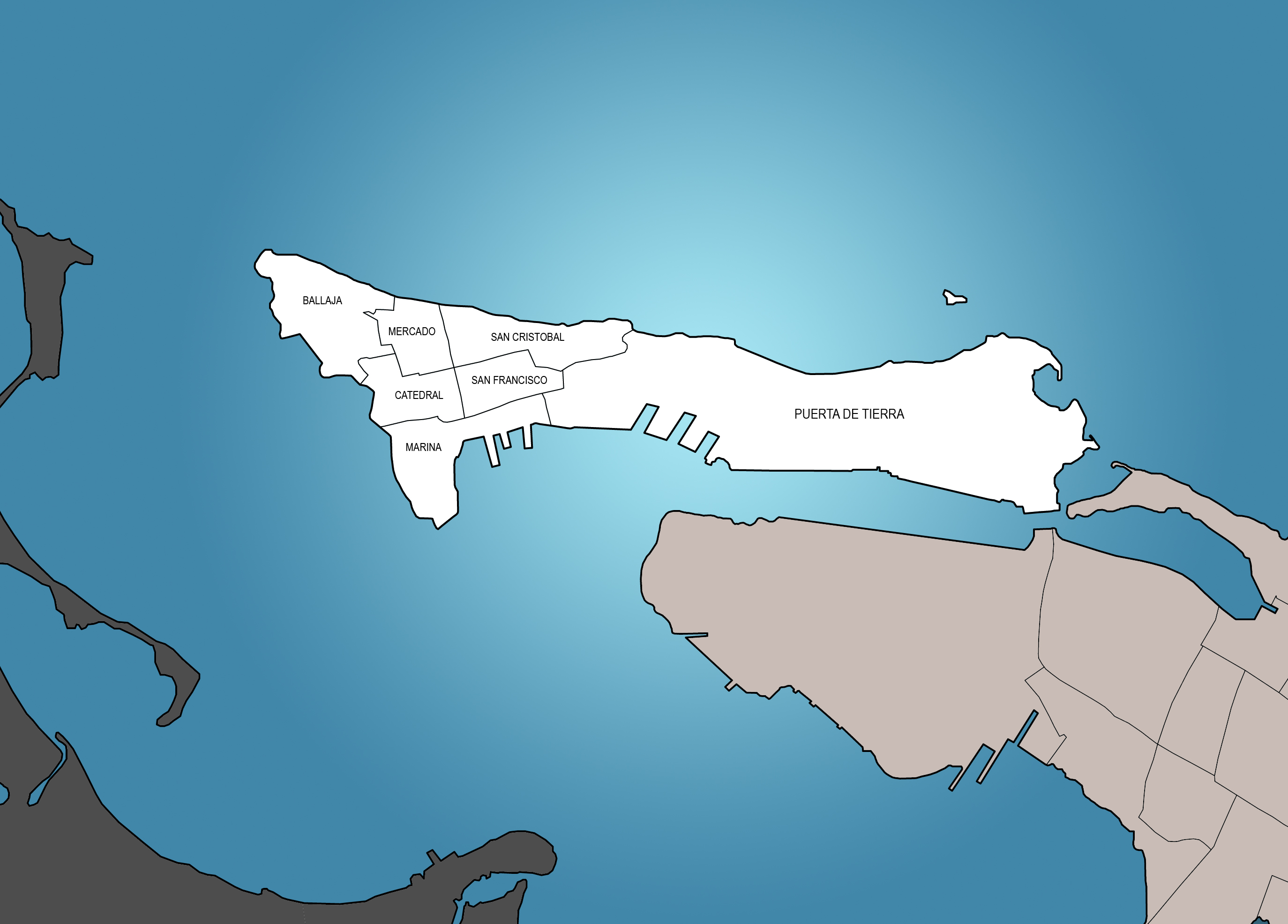
- San Francisco is in San Juan Antiguo

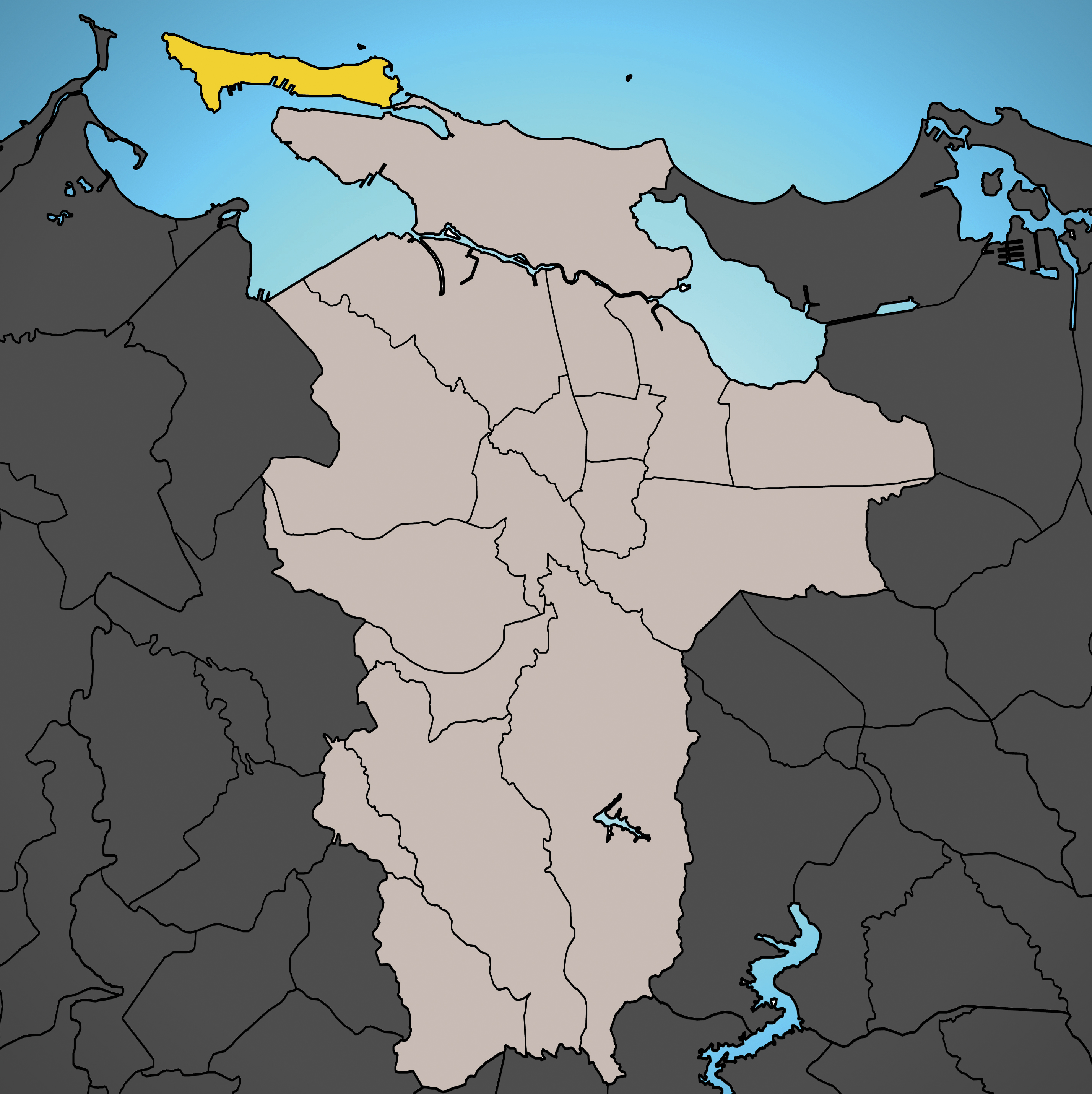
- San Juan Antiguo is in San Juan

- San Juan is in Puerto Rico
- Coordinates: 18.4657344°N 66.1131640°W
- Commonwealth: Puerto Rico
- Municipality: San Juan
- Barrio: San Juan Antiguo

San Francisco, within Old San Juan, is one of the 7 subbarrios of San Juan Antiguo barrio in the municipality of San Juan in Puerto Rico. A historic church, the Church of Saint Francis of Assisi, is located in San Francisco.

== History ==
Puerto Rico was ceded by Spain in the aftermath of the Spanish–American War under the terms of the Treaty of Paris of 1898 and became an unincorporated territory of the United States. In 1899, the United States Department of War conducted a census of Puerto Rico finding that the population of San Francisco was 1,177. In 2010, the population of San Francisco was 796.

== Saint Francis of Assisi Church ==
Parroquia San Francisco de Asis (Church of Saint Francis of Assisi) is located on San Francisco Street. This historic church gives its name to the subbarrio. Some famous Puerto Rican figures such as Impressionist painter Francisco Oller have been buried in its crypt.

== Demographics ==
Historical population
Census	Pop.	Note	%±
1900	1,177		—
1910	3,782		221.3%
1920	3,103		−18.0%
1930	2,754		−11.2%
1940	2,780		0.9%
1950	2,590		−6.8%
1980	632		—
1990	614		−2.8%
2000	672		9.4%
U.S. Decennial Census; 1900 (uses 1899 data) 1910-1930; 1930-1950 1980-2000 2010

== Gallery ==
San Francisco and its church:

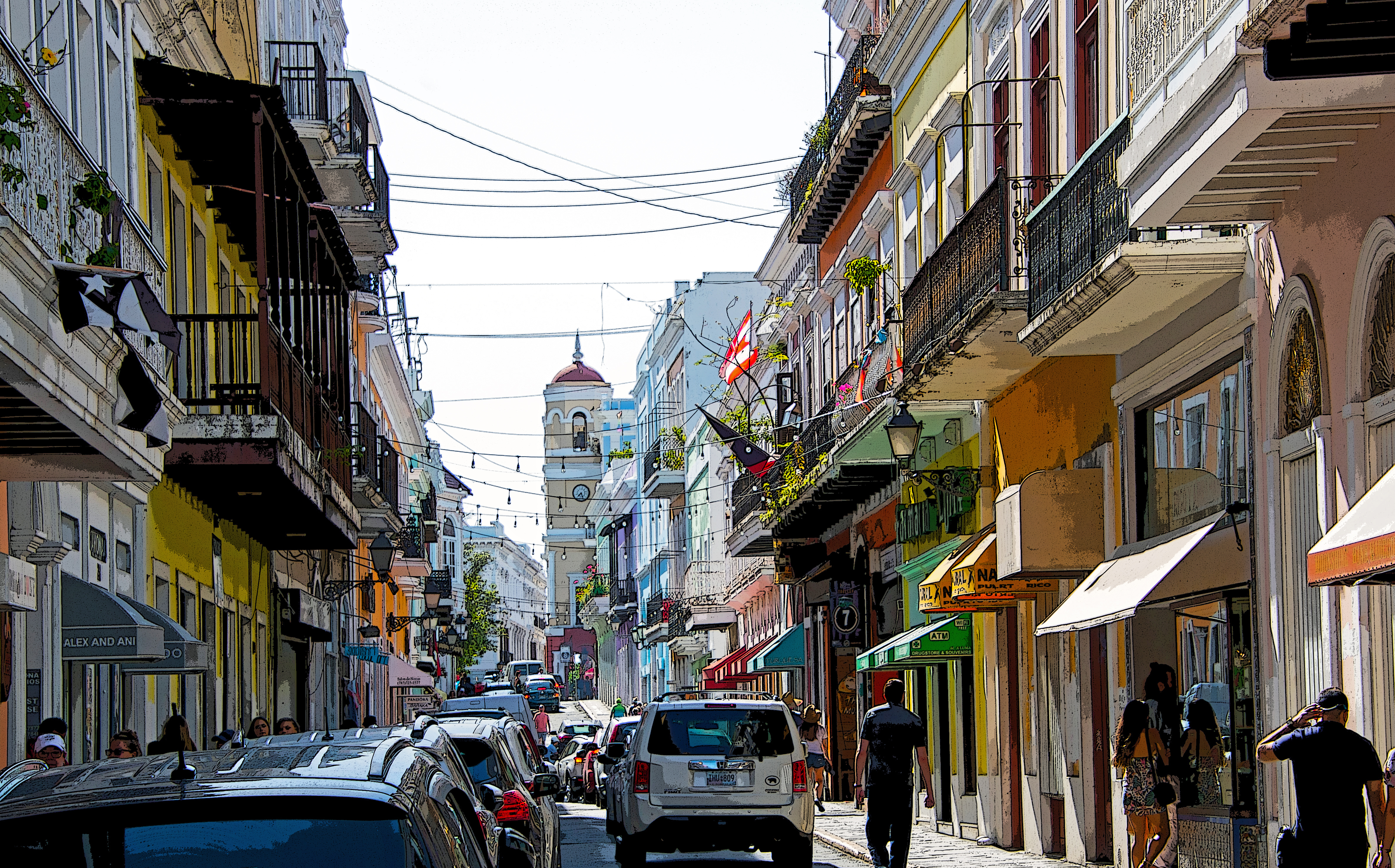
Street in San Francisco

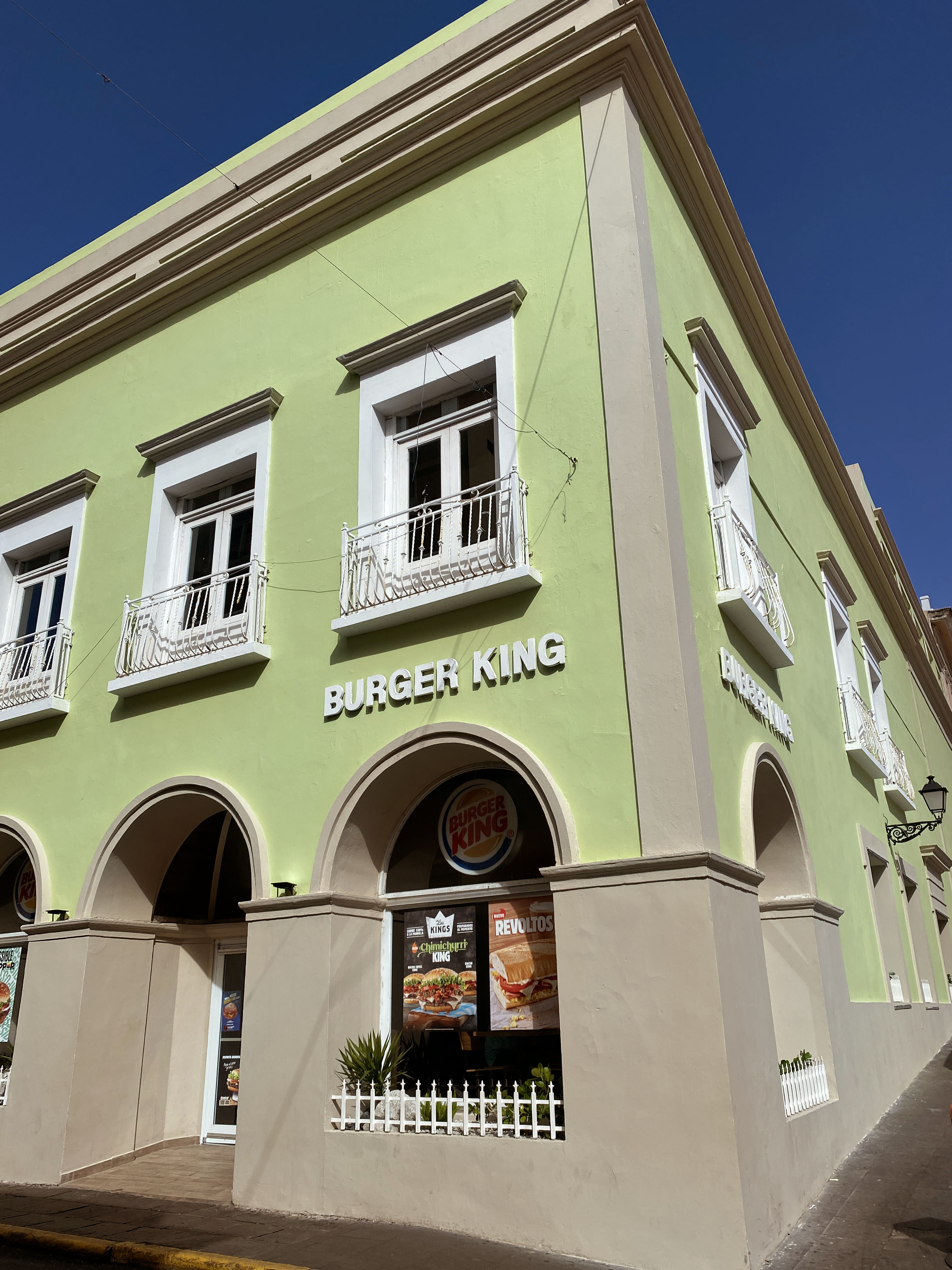
Burger King

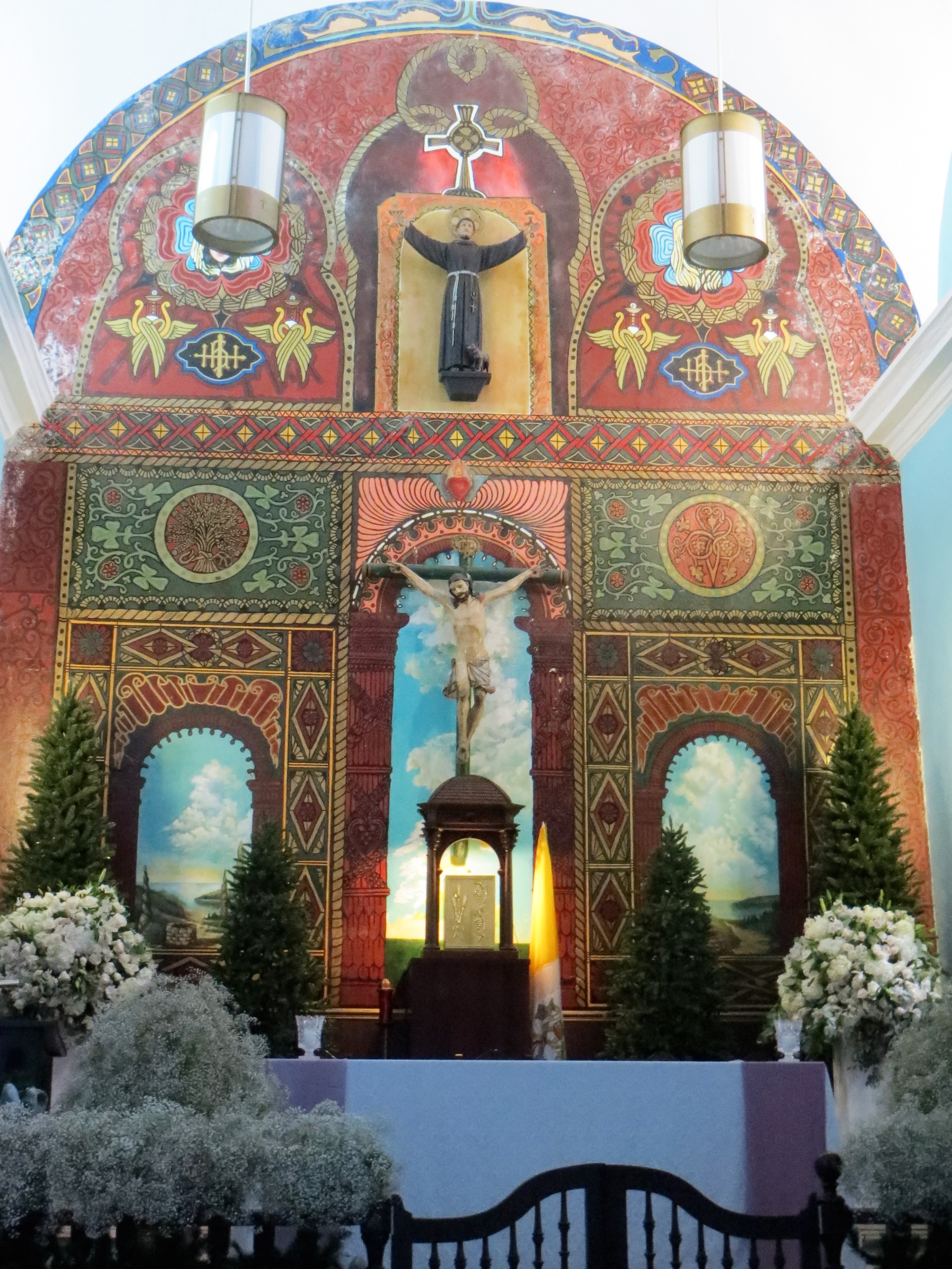

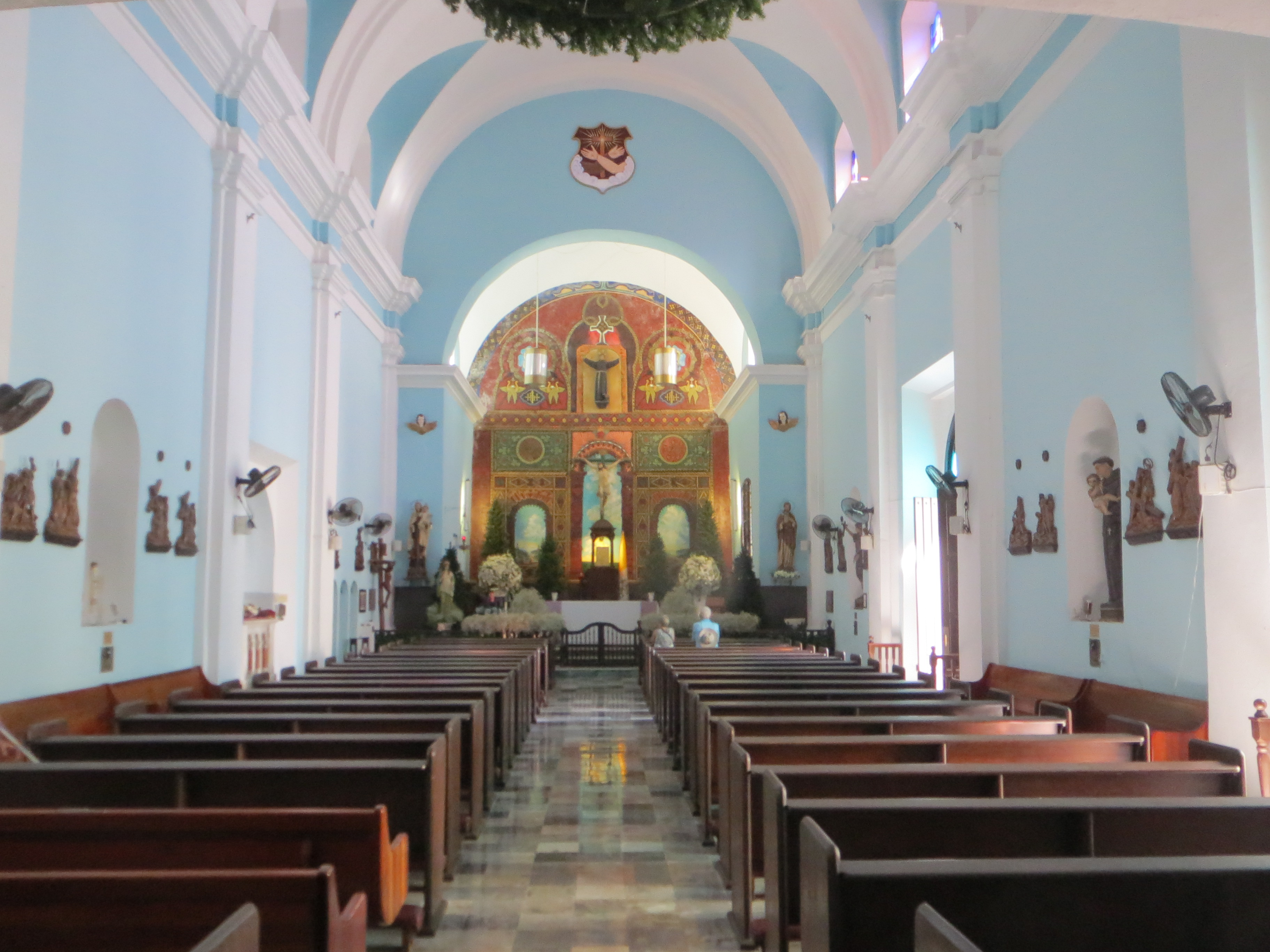

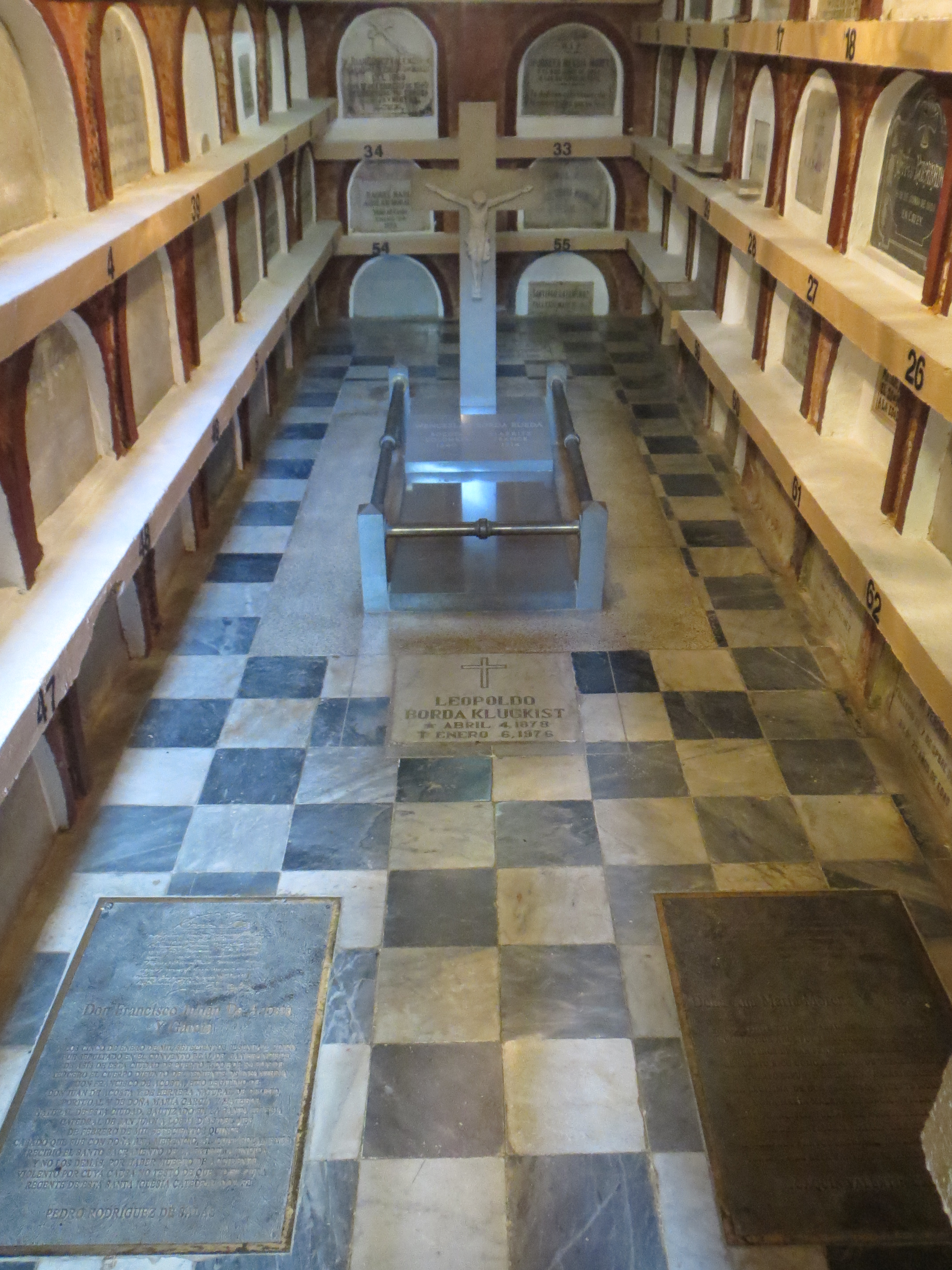

== See also ==
- List of communities in Puerto Rico
