= Saint Francis of Assisi (disambiguation) =

Saint Francis of Assisi was a friar and the founder of the Order of Friars Minor.

Saint Francis of Assisi may also refer to:

== Churches ==
- Saint Francis of Assisi Cathedral (disambiguation)
- St. Francis of Assisi Church (disambiguation)

== Schools ==
- St. Francis of Assisi Elementary, a Catholic elementary school in Vancouver, Canada
- St Francis of Assisi Catholic College, a mixed Roman Catholic secondary school in Walsall, England
- The Academy of St Francis of Assisi, a secondary school in Liverpool, England
- Saint Francis of Assisi College, a system of private, Catholic-oriented but non-sectarian Philippine schools
- St. Francis of Assisi Elementary School, a Catholic school within the Archdiocese of Louisville, United States

== Other uses ==
- Saint Francis of Assisi Parish, Karachi, Pakistan
- Saint Francis of Assisi (film), a 1944 Mexican film
- Francis of Assisi (film), a 1961 film
- Francesco di Assisi, a 1966 film
- Saint Francis of Assisi, a 1923 book by G. K. Chesterton

== See also ==
- Sisters of St. Francis of Assisi, a Roman Catholic religious order for women
- Saint François d'Assise, a 1983 opera by Olivier Messiaen
