= Church of San Francisco =

Church of San Francisco or Iglesia de San Francisco (most often dedicated to St Francis of Assisi, in Spanish: San Francisco de Assisi) may refer to:

== Chile ==
- Church of San Francisco, Castro
- Iglesia de San Francisco (Chiu Chiu)
- Iglesia de San Francisco, Santiago de Chile

== Colombia ==
- Iglesia de San Francisco (Barranquilla), Barranquilla
- San Francisco Church, Bogotá, Bogotá
- San Francisco religious complex, Cali, Cali

== Costa Rica ==
- Iglesia de San Francisco de Asís (San José), San José

== Ecuador ==
- Iglesia y Convento de San Francisco, Quito

== Mexico ==
- Church of San Francisco, Madero Street, Mexico City
- Church of San Francisco (Puebla)
- Church of San Francisco Acatepec in San Andrés Cholula, Metropolitan area of Puebla

== Philippines ==
- San Francisco Church of Intramuros, an extant church located inside the walled city of Intramuros, Manila

== Spain ==
- Iglesia de San Francisco (Avilés)
- Iglesia de San Francisco (Betanzos)
- Iglesia de San Francisco (Ceuta)
- Church of San Francisco de Sales (Madrid)
- Iglesia de San Francisco de Asís (Santa Cruz de Tenerife)

== Venezuela ==
- Iglesia de San Francisco (Caracas), Caracas

== See also in Italian ==
- See Church of San Francesco (disambiguation)
