= Calascibetta =

Calascibetta Calascibbetta (Sicilian)
- Comune
- Comune di Calascibetta
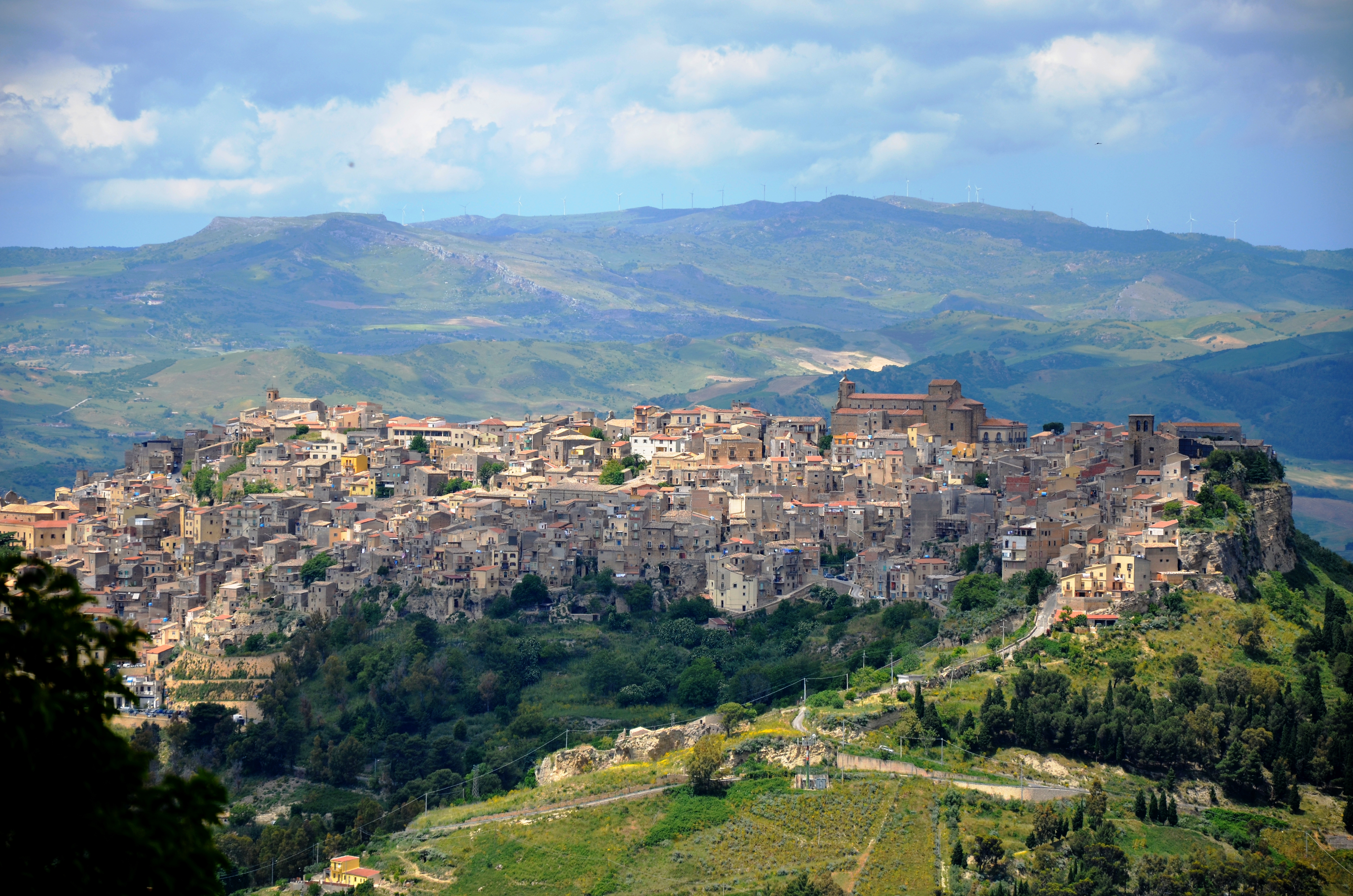
- Panorama of Calascibetta

- Location within Italy Location within Sicily
- Coordinates: 37°35′N 14°16′E
- Country: Italy
- Region: Sicily
- Province: Enna (EN)
- Frazioni: Cacchiamo, Buonriposo, Lago Morello

Government
  - Mayor: Piero Antonio Santi Capizzi

Area
  - Total: 89.12 km^{2} (34.41 sq mi)
- Elevation: 691 m (2,267 ft)

Population (2026)
  - Total: 3,948
  - Density: 44.30/km^{2} (114.7/sq mi)
- Demonym: Xibetani
- Time zone: UTC+1 (CET)
  - Summer (DST): UTC+2 (CEST)
- Postal code: 94010
- Dialing code: 0935
- Patron saint: St. Peter in chains
- Saint day: First Sunday of August
- Website: Official website

Calascibetta (Sicilian: Calascibbetta) is a town and comune (municipality) in the Province of Enna in the autonomous island region of Sicily in Italy. It has 3,948 inhabitants.

It is one of I Borghi più belli d'Italia ("The most beautiful villages of Italy").

== History ==
It was assumed that Calascibetta was founded in the 9th century as a Muslim military camp, on the fortress in front of Henna, to attempt the siege of the Byzantine stronghold. The territory was already inhabited in ancient times, as evidenced by the necropolis of Calcarella (11th and 10th centuries BC), of Realmese (with tombs of the 9th and 6th centuries BC), of Valle Coniglio (10th and 7th century BC) and of Malpasso (Copper Age).

Frequented in the Byzantine era as evidenced by nineteenth-century documents relating to frescoed caves used by Basilian eremitic monks, it is believed that a real foundation of Calascibetta took place with the Norman conquest of the island, where it appears mentioned in 1062, when it was fortified by Roger I, who had built the castle called "Marco", the first walls, the first village, during the siege of Castrogiovanni, and the great cathedral dedicating it to the Virgin Mary and to the Apostle St. Peter.

Unlike many of the small towns in Sicily, Calascibetta remained a city owned by the central royal government, and not a private feudal property. As such, it experienced a period of unmatched splendor, favored and preferred as it was by the Aragonese kings, including Peter II who died there during a stay, who endowed it, following the example of the Normans, with churches and monuments. Its inhabitants are called Xibetans.

In 1492, Calascibetta was one of about 50 towns in Sicily which included a giudecca, or a Jewish urban neighborhood, typically now labeled as a ghetto.

== Demographics ==
As of 2026, the population is 3,948, of which 48.9% are male, and 51.1% are female. Minors make up 13.2% of the population, and seniors make up 26.9%.

Historical population

| Year | Pop. | ±% |
|---|---|---|
| 1861 | 5,458 | — |
| 1871 | 5,599 | +2.6% |
| 1881 | 6,897 | +23.2% |
| 1901 | 9,112 | +32.1% |
| 1911 | 10,103 | +10.9% |
| 1921 | 12,184 | +20.6% |
| 1931 | 7,716 | −36.7% |
| 1936 | 7,779 | +0.8% |

| Year | Pop. | ±% |
|---|---|---|
| 1951 | 8,035 | +3.3% |
| 1961 | 6,956 | −13.4% |
| 1971 | 5,628 | −19.1% |
| 1981 | 4,837 | −14.1% |
| 1991 | 5,014 | +3.7% |
| 2001 | 4,829 | −3.7% |
| 2011 | 4,628 | −4.2% |
| 2021 | 4,166 | −10.0% |

Source: ISTAT

=== Immigration ===
As of 2025, immigrants make up 5.4% of the total population. The 5 largest foreign countries of birth are Romania, Belgium, Germany, Switzerland, and France.

== Main sights ==
- Sant'Antonio church
- San Francesco D'Assisi
- San Pietro e Santa Maria Maggiore: Mother church of the town
- Maria Santissima del Monte Carmelo
- Santa Maria della Catena
