= Church of Saint Francis of Assisi, San Juan =

Church in San Juan, Puerto Rico

Coordinates: 18°27′58.5″N 66°6′48.5″W

- Church of Saint Francis of Assisi
- U.S. National Historic Landmark District – Contributing property
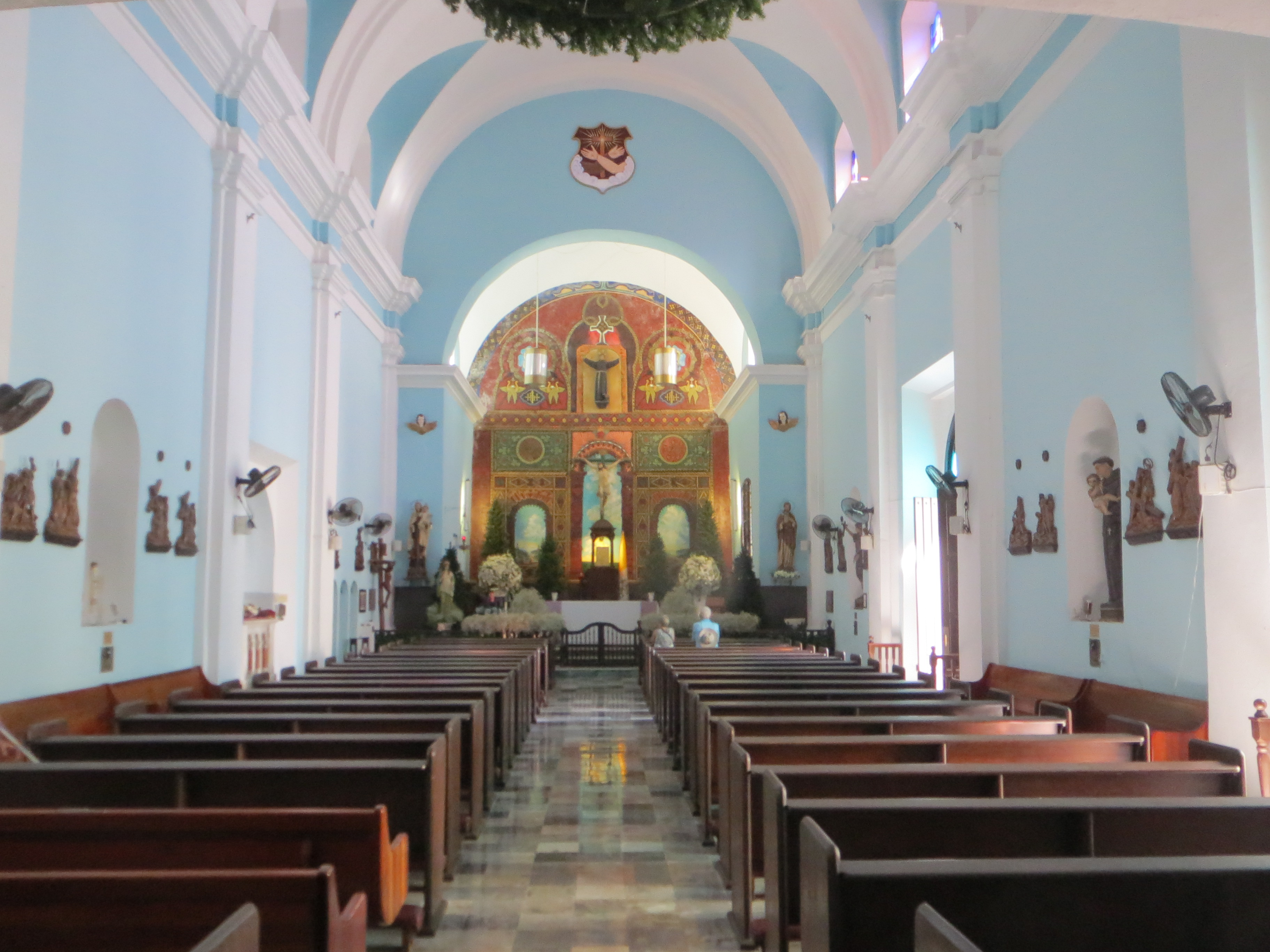
- Church interior in 2015.
- Location: San Juan Antiguo, San Juan, Puerto Rico
- Built: 1876
- Restored: 2007
- Part of: Old San Juan Historic District (ID72001553)
- Designated NHLDCP: October 10, 1972

The Church of Saint Francis of Assisi (Spanish: Iglesia de San Francisco de Asís) is a historic Catholic parish church located in the San Francisco sub-barrio of Old San Juan in San Juan, Puerto Rico. The church has undergone numerous transformations throughout its history, and its original brick and masonry structure can still be admired. The church is also renowned for its crypt which is opened to visitors, and at some point it contained the remains of Puerto Rican Impressionist painter Francisco Oller.

== History ==
The original Church of Saint Francis of Assisi was originally built by the Third Order of Franciscans in 1756 in what is today San Francisco Square (Spanish: Plaza San Francisco) in front of the contemporary church. The modern church was originally an expansion of the original church, which went through numerous transformations after its construction, and it dates to 1876. The mural at the church's altar dates to the 1940s. The church and its mural were meticulously restored in 2007. The church is open to visitors and still offers religious services.

== Gallery ==
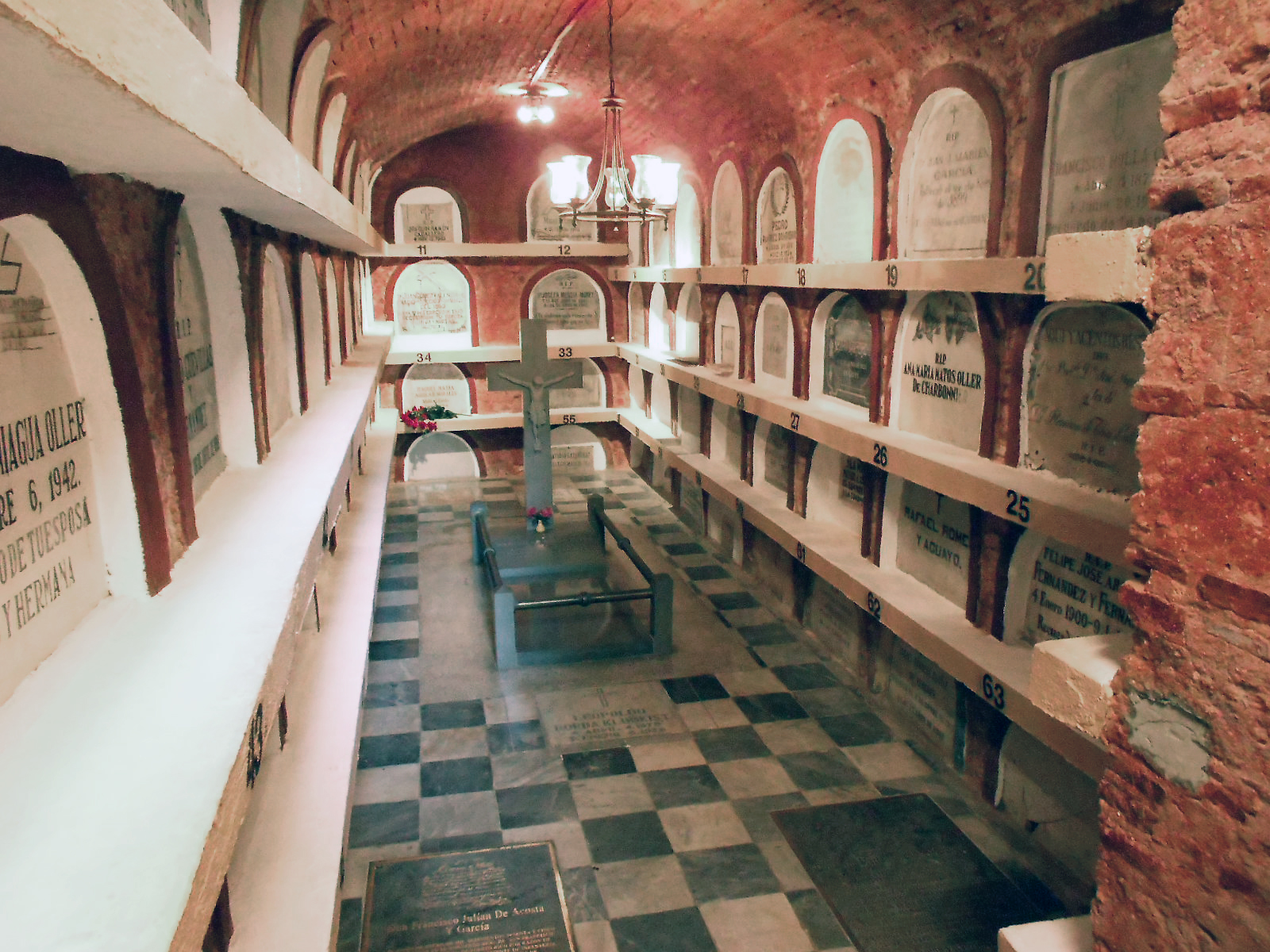
Small Crypt in Old San Juan, Puerto Rico.

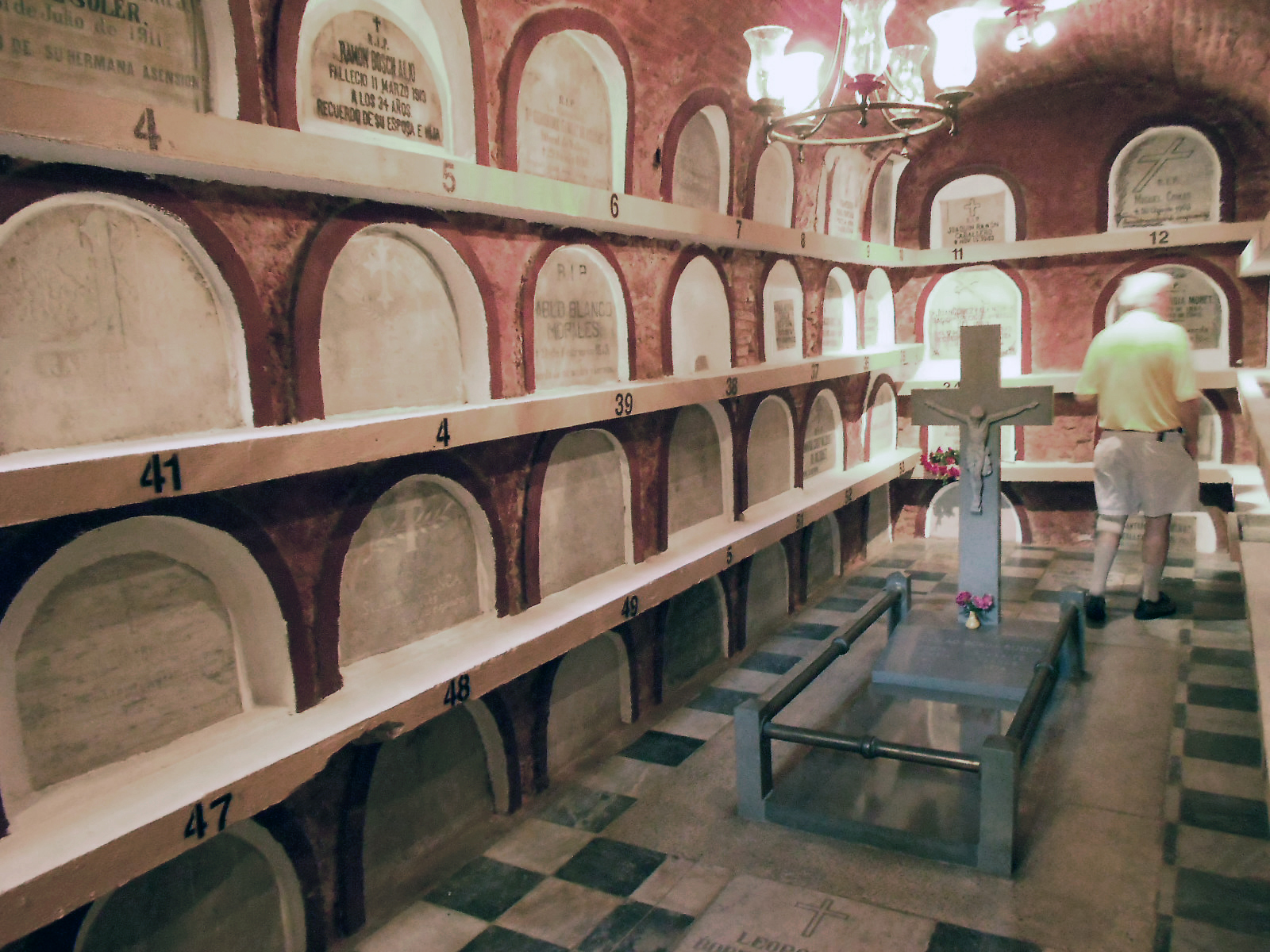
Small Crypt in Old San Juan, Puerto Rico.

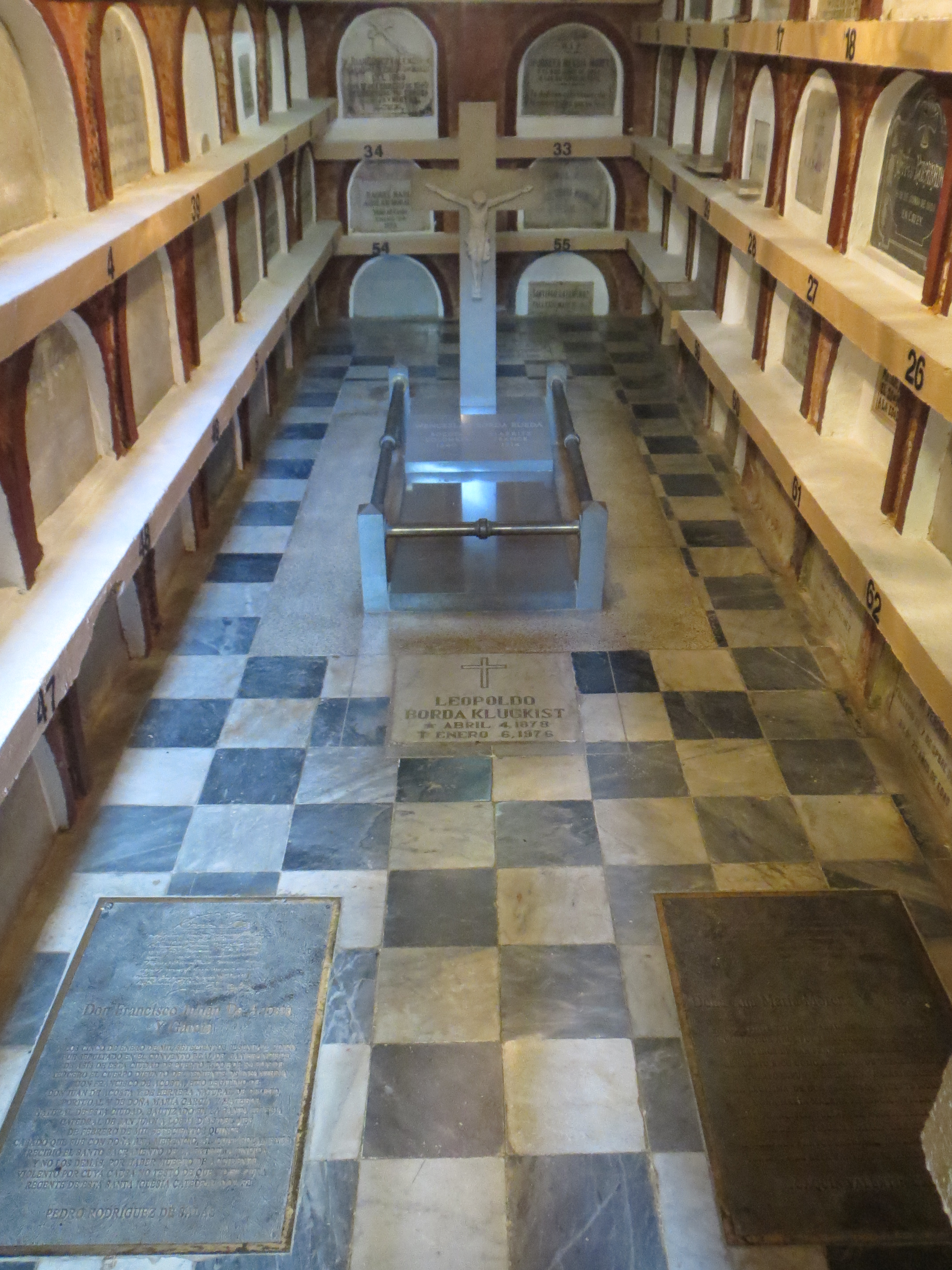
View of the crypt of the church

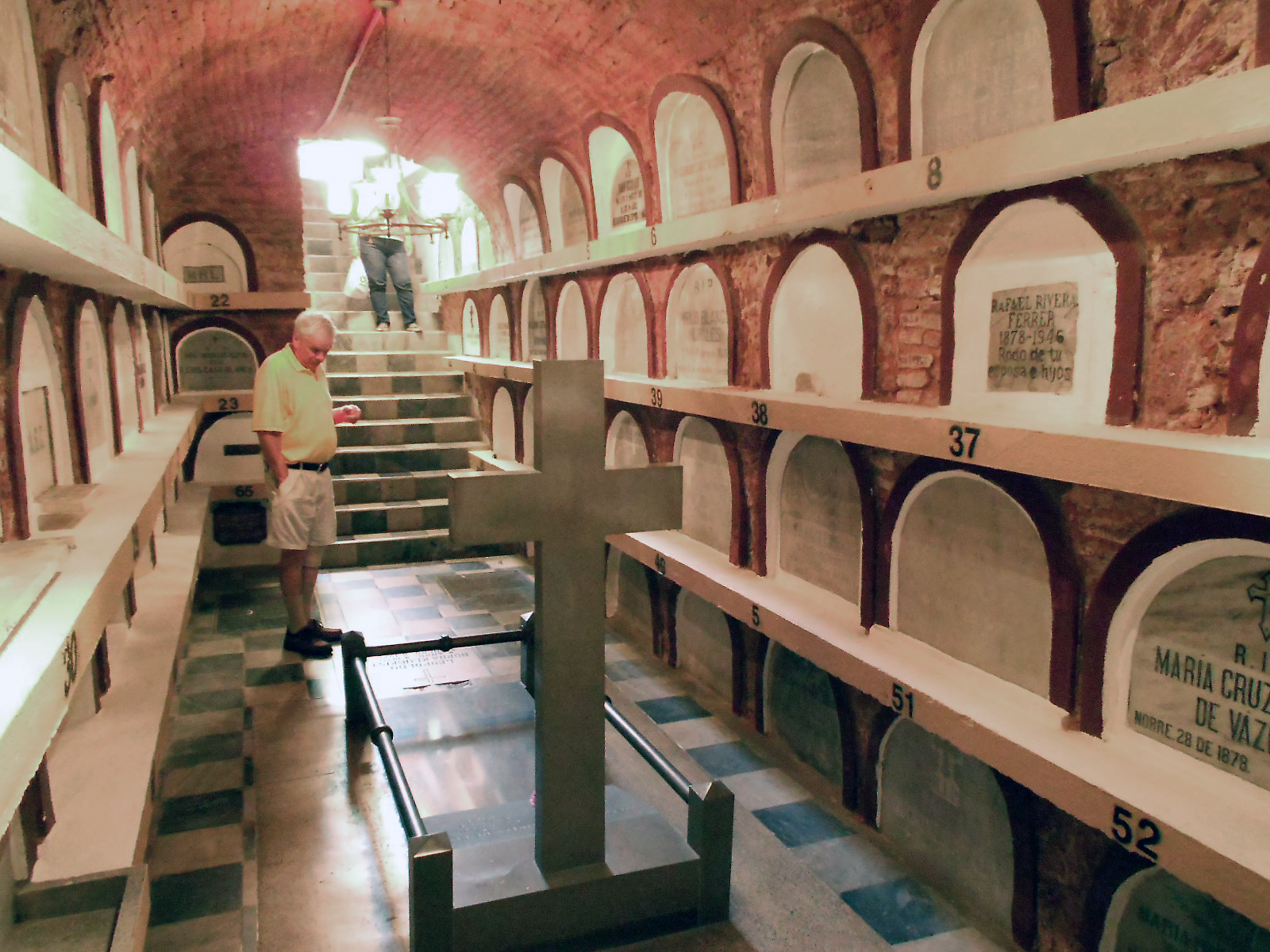
Small Crypt in Old San Juan, Puerto Rico.

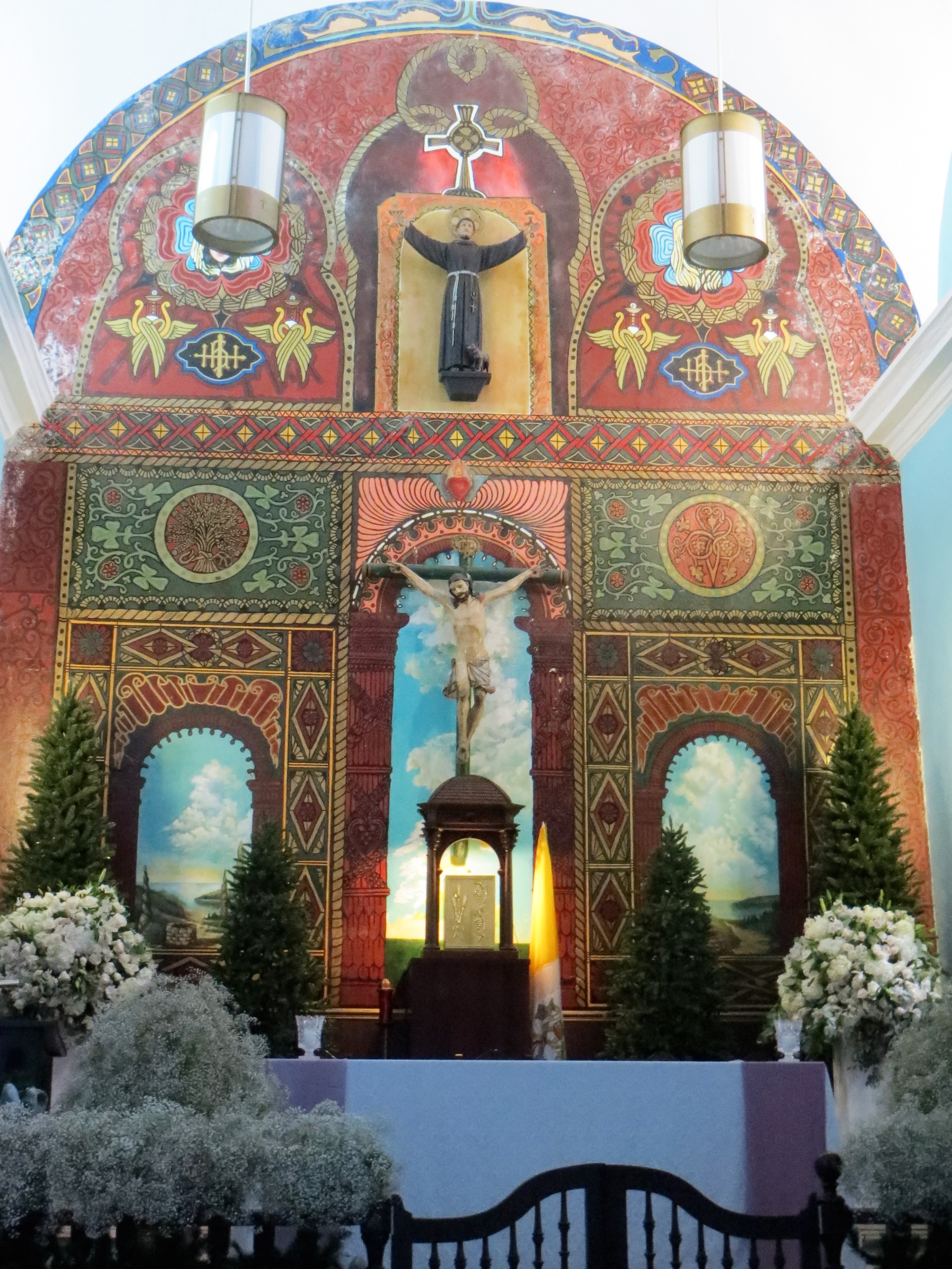
Closeup of the altar's mural

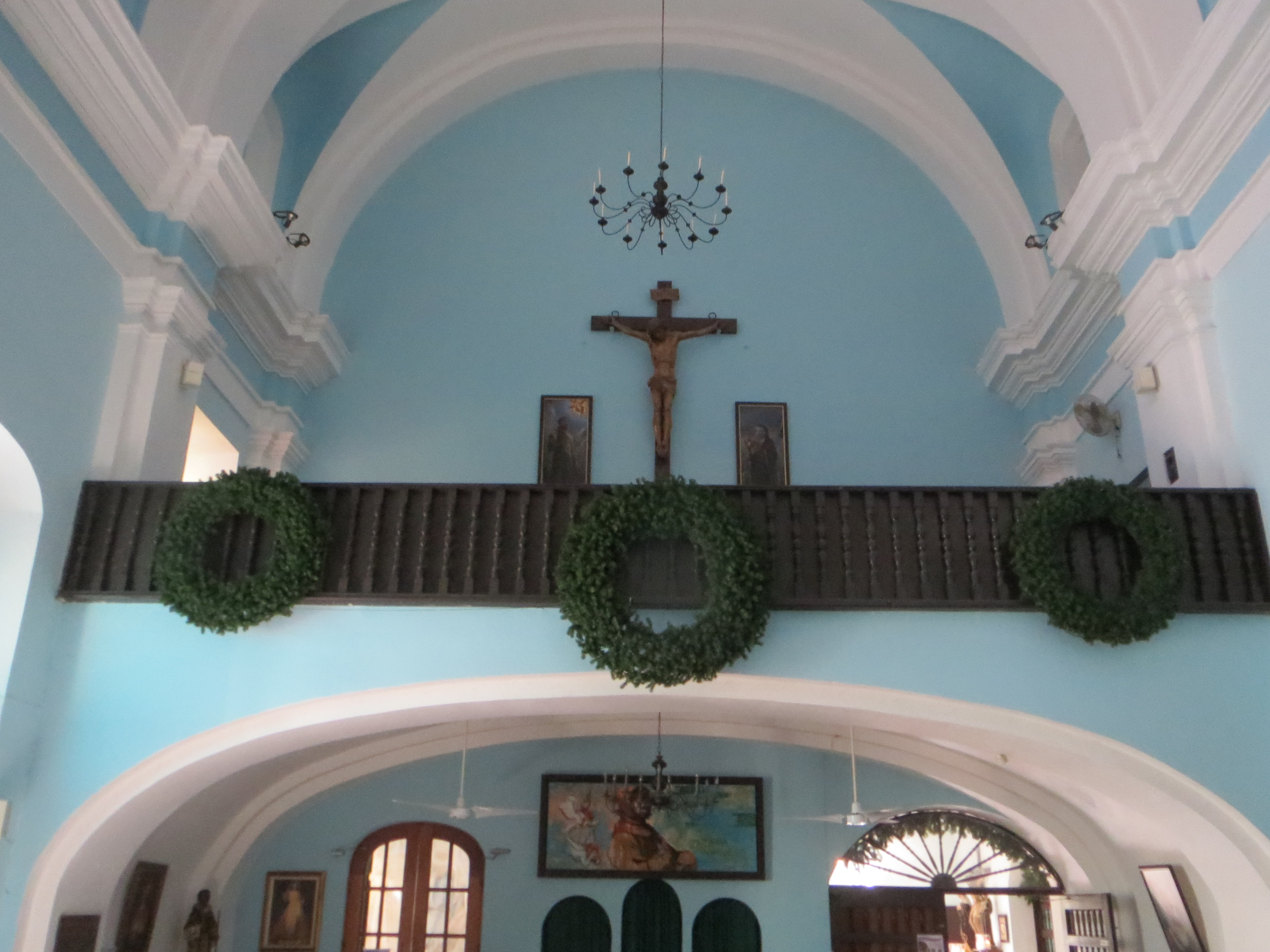
View of the back of the interior of the church where the organ used to be

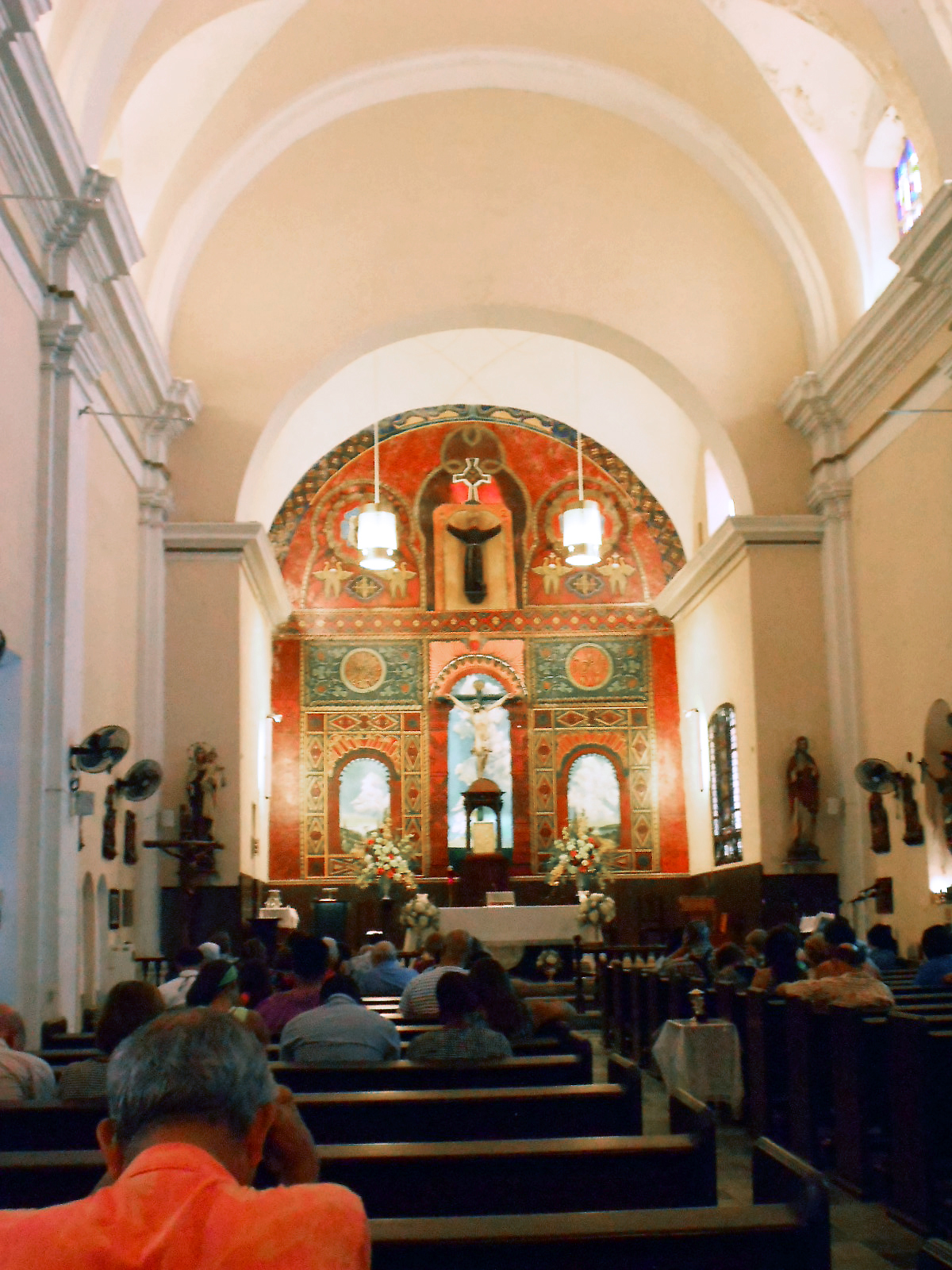
St. Francis of Assisi Church in Old San Juan, Puerto Rico.
