= San Juan Antiguo =

Barrio of San Juan, Puerto Rico

- Barrio
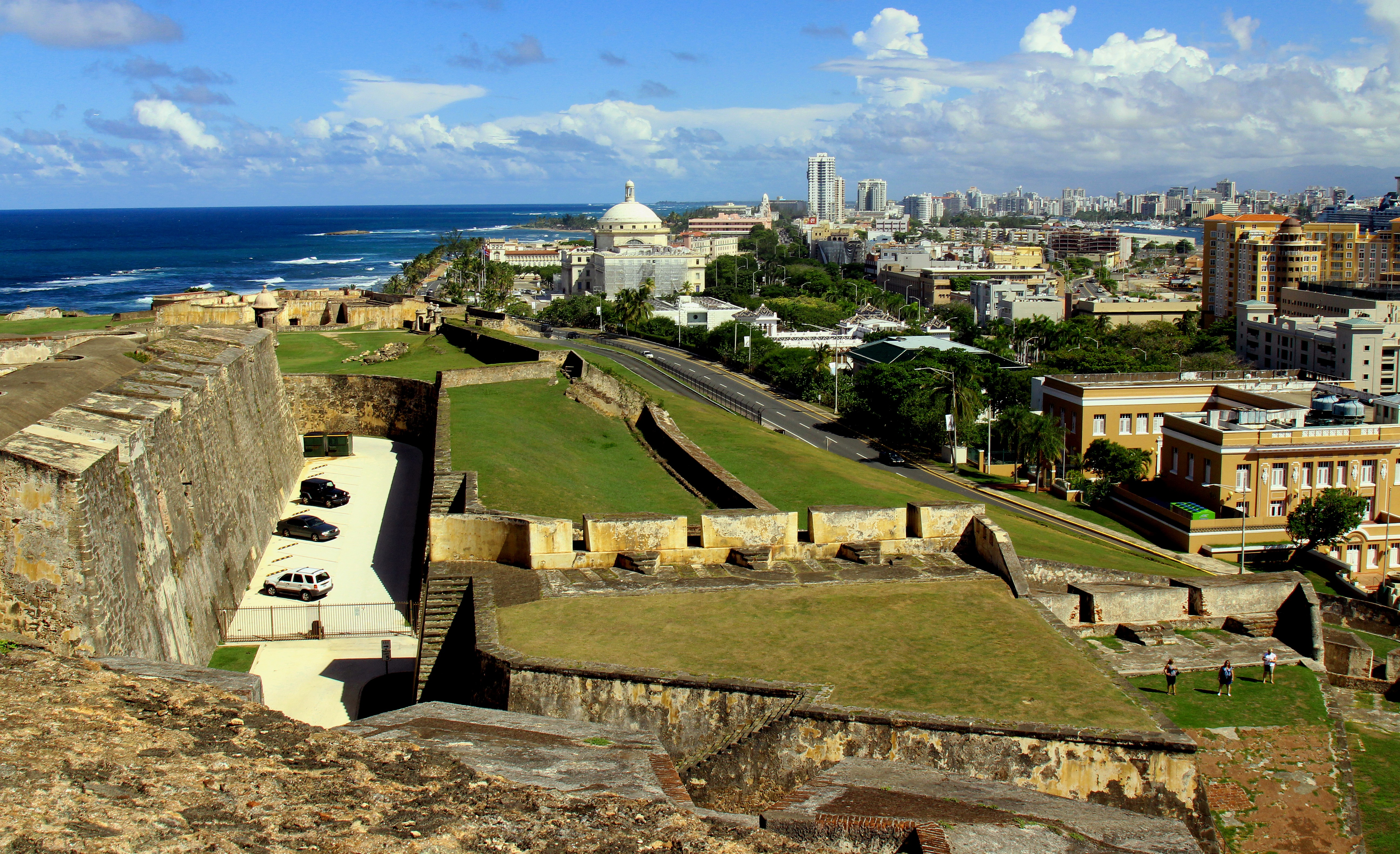
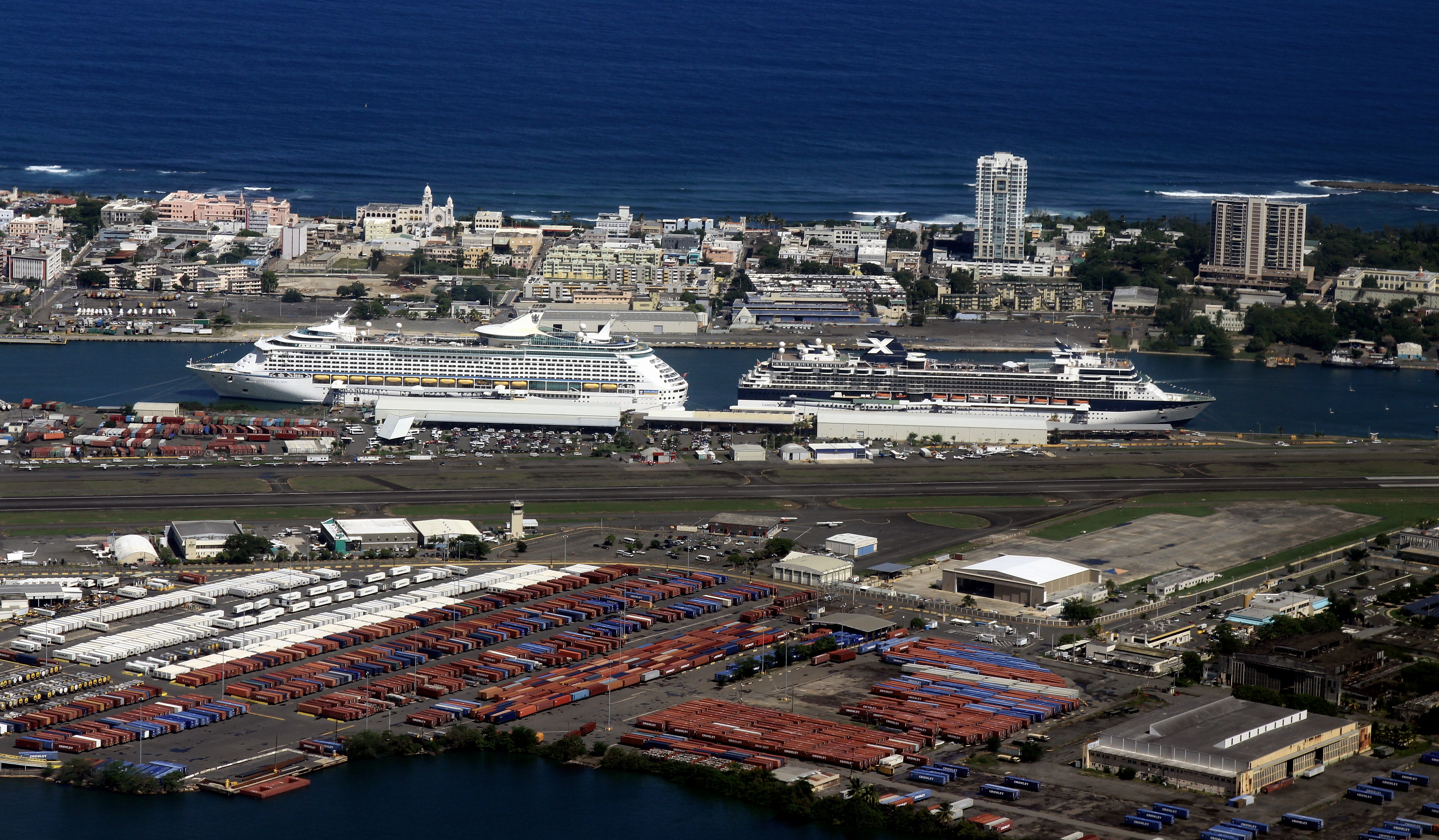
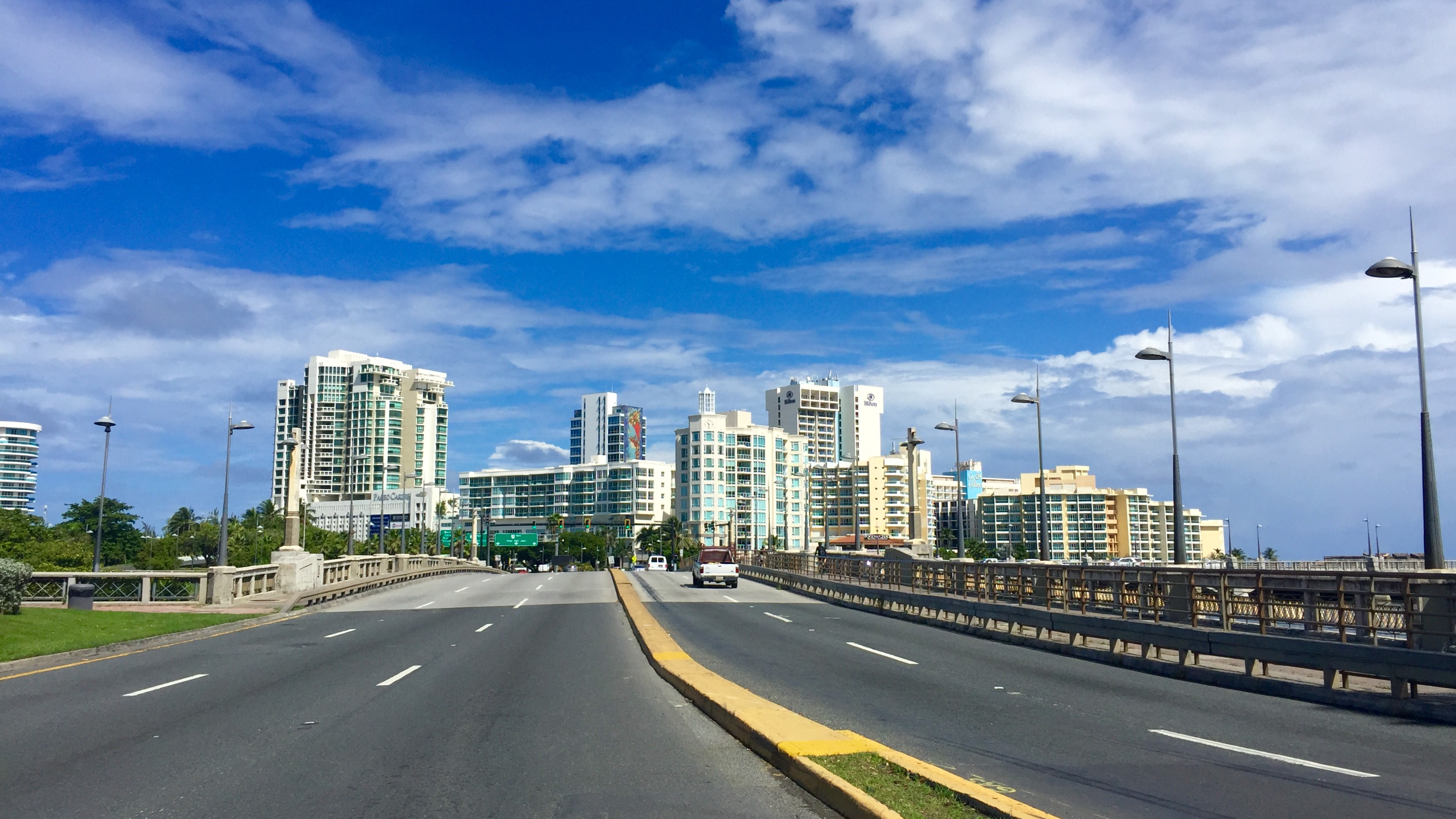
- Old San Juan quarter from El Morro fortress (right) to San Cristóbal fortress (left) in the western end of San Juan Islet Puerta de Tierra district (foreground) in the eastern end of the Islet from San Cristóbal South-central Puerta de Tierra (background) Southeastern Puerta de Tierra from Guillermo Esteves Bridge

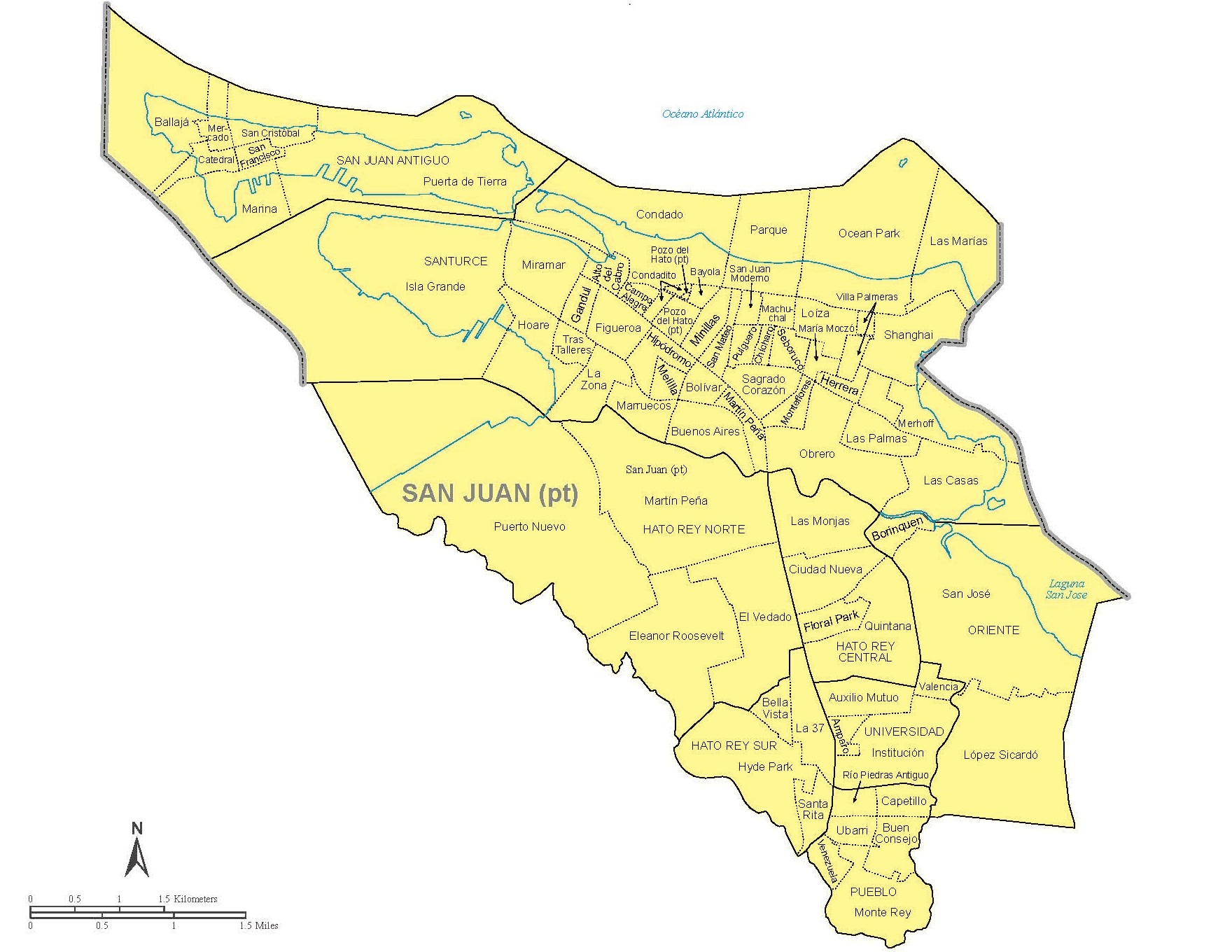
- San Juan Antiguo and districts (northwest) bounded by Santurce (south) within northern San Juan
- Interactive map of San Juan Antiguo
- Coordinates: 18°28′0.43″N 66°6′26.47″W
- Commonwealth: Puerto Rico
- Municipality: San Juan

Area
  - Total: 2.63 sq mi (6.8 km^{2})
  - Land: 1.02 sq mi (2.6 km^{2})
  - Water: 0.61 sq mi (1.6 km^{2})
- Elevation: 20 ft (6.1 m)

Population (2020)
  - Total: 6,383
  - Density: 6,260/sq mi (2,420/km^{2})
- (US Census 2020)
- Time zone: UTC−4 (AST)

San Juan Antiguo is a highly urbanized, densely populated historical, cultural, commercial, residential, and resort area in Puerto Rico, organized as one of 18 barrios of San Juan, the capital city and municipality. Congruent with San Juan Islet in the northeast of the main island, bounded by the Atlantic Ocean to the north, San Juan Bay to the west and south, and Santurce barrio to the east, it is divided into 7 subbarrios or districts, namely Puerta de Tierra in the east, and Ballajá, Catedral, Mercado, San Cristóbal, San Francisco, and Marina in the west, which collectively comprise the original limits of the capital city under Spanish Empire rule during the Age of Discovery and Sail, today the Old San Juan historic quarter. It is home to seat of government, San Juan Cruise Port, and the Caribe Hilton Hotel, among others. It is accessible by land via the Guillermo Esteves and Dos Hermanos Bridges in its eastern end, which are within 5 mi (8 km) of the Condado and Isla Verde resort areas, Hato Rey business center, and SJU airport.

Since 1521, San Juan Antiguo has served as the seat of government in Puerto Rico, making it the site of the oldest permanent European settlement in the territory, and the second-oldest European-established continuous capital city in the Americas, after Santo Domingo in Hispaniola. It is home to La Fortaleza, seat of the executive branch, situated within the Old San Juan quarter in its western end, the Capitol of Puerto Rico, seat of the legislative branch, within the Puerta de Tierra historic district in its center, and the Supreme Court Building, seat of the judicial branch, within Puerta de Tierra in its eastern end.

San Juan Antiguo is extensively developed. The Old San Juan historic quarter comprises narrow streets arranged in an orthogonal grid densely-packed with rectangular city blocks collectively encircled by defensive walls equipped with bastions and forts. It also includes several areas immediately outside the walls, namely La Puntilla and La Perla communities, and Santa María Magdalena de Pazzis Cemetery. The Puerta de Tierra district, immediately east of Old San Juan, has a mixture of historic and modern governmental, industrial, commercial, and residential buildings. It also has two landscape parks and two sports parks next to an open-access beach part of its northeastern coast. The southern region of district is mostly dedicated to facilities part of the Port of San Juan. In addition to its main thoroughfares, namely Luis Muñoz Marín Avenue and Juan Ponce de León Avenue, Old San Juan and Puerta de Tierra are connected by a promenade and bikeway atop the cliffed coastline of northern San Juan Islet.

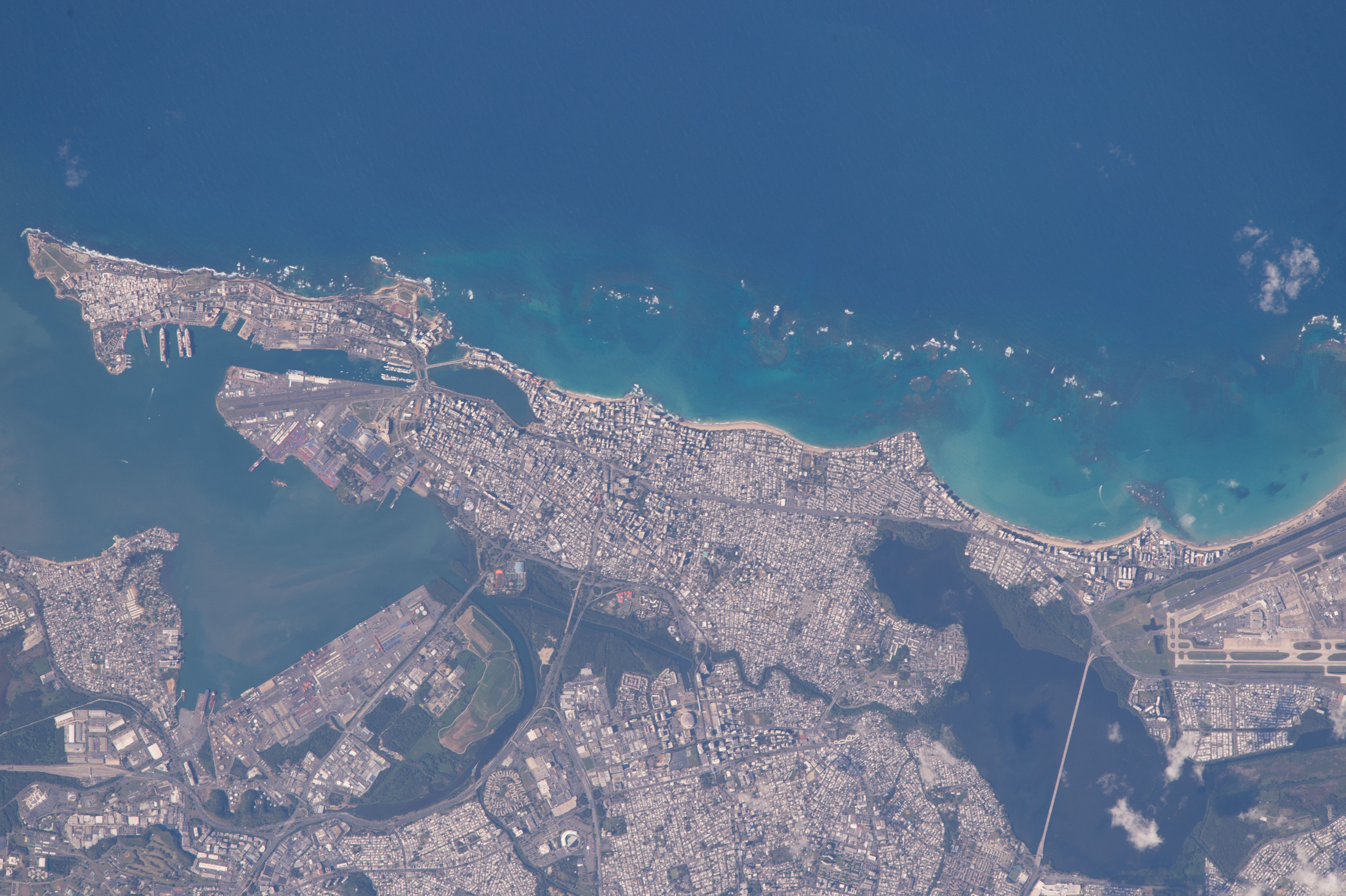
Satellite view from Old San Juan historic quarter (upper left) in San Juan Islet in the San Juan capital municipality to Isla Verde district (right) in the Carolina municipality with San Juan Antiguo visible (upper left), 2016

== Name ==
The name of the barrio dates to the original foundation of the city of San Juan, originally named Puerto Rico de San Juan Bautista at the moment of its foundation in 1521, San Juan Bautista being the name given to the island of Puerto Rico by the earliest Spanish settlers. By the 18th century, the ambiguous and colloquial use of San Juan Bautista and Puerto Rico for both the city and the island in time led to the unofficial renaming of the island and the city as Puerto Rico and San Juan, respectively. As the city itself further expanded beyond the islet into the towns of Santurce (merged into San Juan by the 19th century) and Río Piedras (merged in the 20th century), the barrio was officially named Antiguo to distinguish it from the rest of the modern city. This naming convention of calling an urban core-barrio Pueblo Antiguo or Pueblo Viejo is also seen in other municipalities' barrios such as Pueblo Viejo in Guaynabo, the location of the first colonial settlement in both that municipality and the island of Puerto Rico.

The name San Juan Antiguo (Spanish for Old San Juan) refers to the geographical and political subdivision of the municipality of San Juan, not to be confused with Old San Juan (Viejo San Juan), the historic district and tourist attraction located within the barrio itself. Historically, the names San Juan Antiguo and Viejo San Juan were often used interchangeably due to the synonymous nature of the adjectives antiguo and viejo (meaning 'old' or 'ancient'). However, the name San Juan Antiguo is almost never used today to refer to the historic district itself. The name San Juan by itself is often also used to refer to the barrio San Juan Antiguo, with many Puerto Ricans today still referring to the rest of the modern city outside of the isleta as Río Piedras.

== History ==
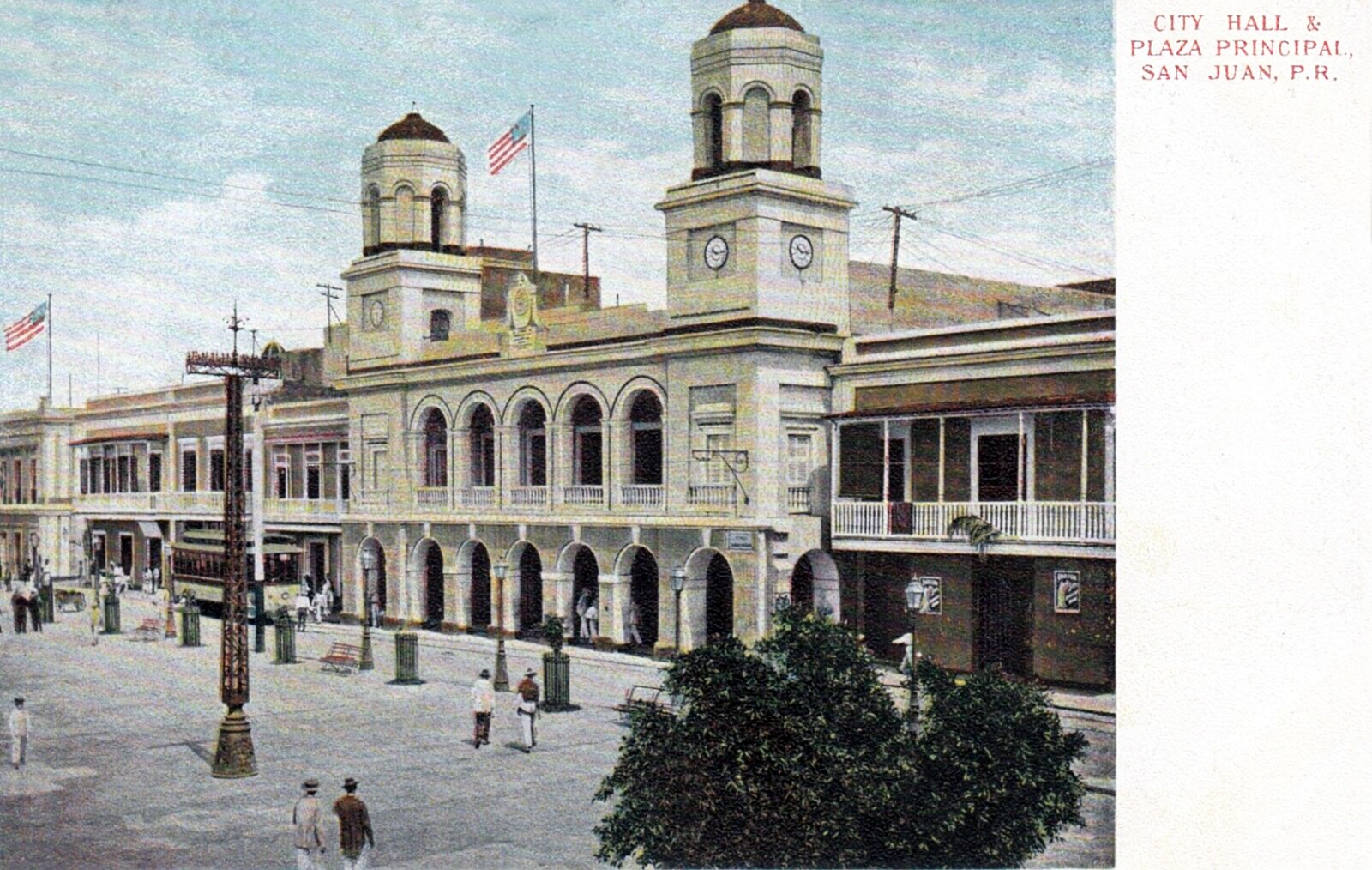
San Juan City Hall, the municipal headquarters since at least 1789.

The first documented inhabitants of the area now known as San Juan Antiguo were the indigenous Taino, with evidence of small fishing villages being found in Puerta de Tierra subbarrio during the 19th and 20th centuries. The first European settlement of the barrio began on August 8, 1511, when the settlement of Caparra was abandoned in favor of a new town planned across the bay in the southwestern corner of the Isleta de San Juan. The new settlement was officially founded on August 15, 1521. By the end of the 16th century, the town was the fully-functional administrative center for the Spanish colonization of the rest of Puerto Rico and beyond. The establishment of a well-defended port in the San Juan Bay also established the settlement as a key point for the Spanish military, trade and expansion into the New World.

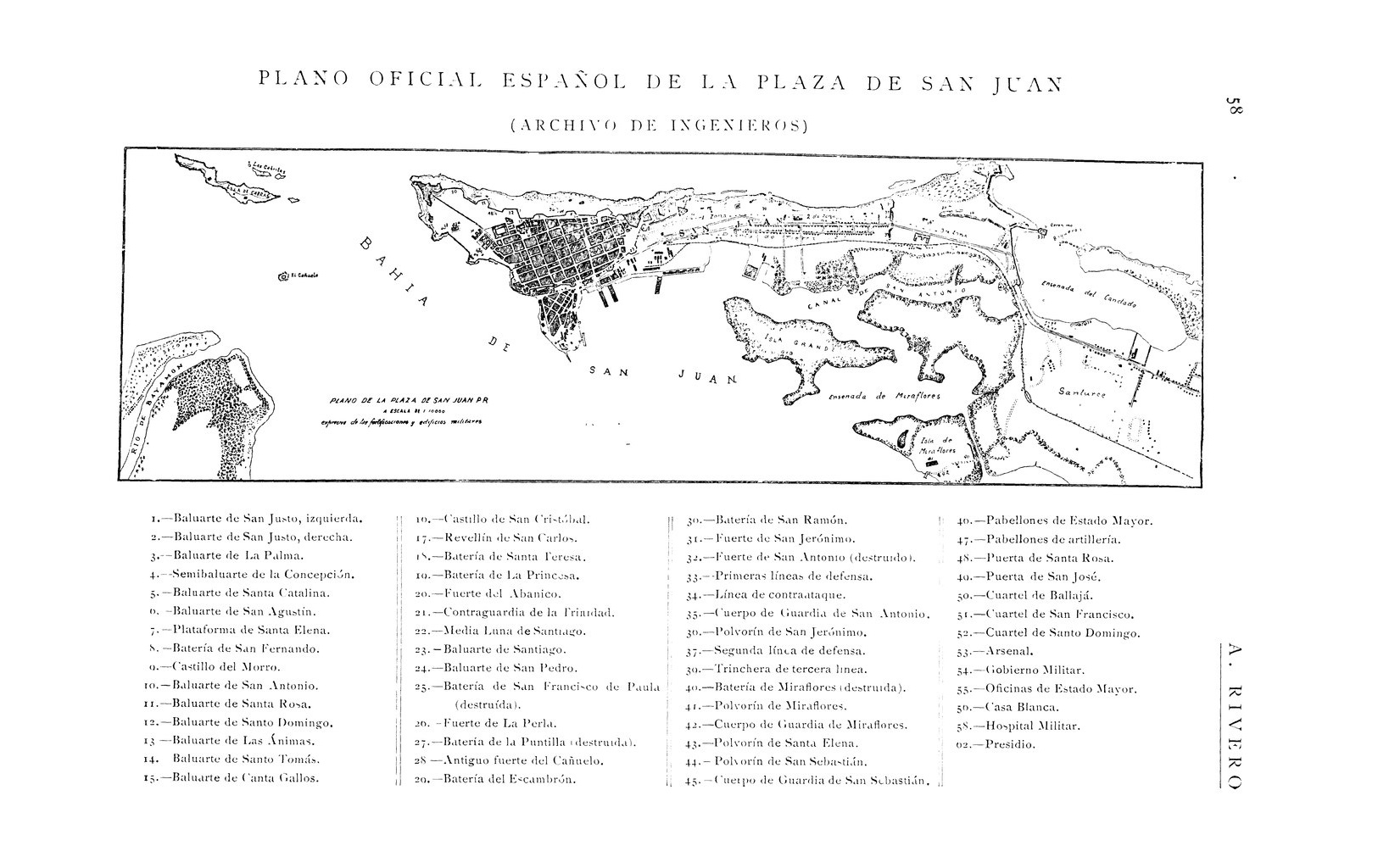
Official Spanish map of San Juan Antiguo during the Spanish–American War

Across its history from its foundation and by the 17th century onwards, the Spanish-founded city of Puerto Rico de San Juan Bautista was coextensive with the modern barrio of San Juan Antiguo. This continued to be the case until the annexation of the town of San Mateo de Cangrejos (now known as the barrio of Santurce) into the city in 1863. The district corresponding to San Juan Antiguo was often mentioned in documents of the time as Puerto Rico de San Juan, Puerto Rico de Puerto Rico, San Juan de Puerto Rico or Plaza de San Juan Bautista when distinguishing it from the wider "town of San Juan", which was now growing to become one of the largest towns in the island. The administrative entity of the barrio emerged after the annexation of Santurce, during the second half of the 19th century, first known as Barrio de San Juan.

In the aftermath of the Spanish–American War, Puerto Rico became a territorial colony of the United States of America. According to the 1899 census of Puerto Rico conducted by the United States War Department, the population of the barrio of San Juan Antiguo (then referred to simply as San Juan Pueblo) was 33,006 inhabitants. With the implementation of new administrative practices during the 20th century, the core urban barrio of each Puerto Rican municipality came to be officially known as Pueblo, which was the case of the name of the barrio used from then on: San Juan Pueblo. In the late 20th century, these Pueblo barrios were officially changed to barrio-pueblo, to explicitly identify them for the context of the 1990 and subsequent US censuses. In the case of the municipality of San Juan, which features multiple urban cores rather than a single center as in most other Puerto Rican municipalities, the name San Juan Antiguo was chosen instead of renaming the barrio to San Juan barrio-pueblo. The name of the barrio Pueblo, located in the now district of Río Piedras, serves as a reminder of that barrio's former status as the urban core of the former municipality of Río Piedras before its annexation to the modern city and municipality of San Juan in 1951. San Juan Antiguo, however, continues to serve as the administrative center for the municipality of San Juan with the San Juan City Hall and numerous other municipal and civic buildings located there.

== Geography ==
San Juan Islet

San Juan Antiguo is located entirely within the Isleta de San Juan. Measuring 1.02 square miles (2.6 square kilometers) across, the barrio is coextensive with the isleta. The total jurisdiction including water spans 2.63 square miles (6.8 square kilometers). This total area includes the isleta, several reefs and islets located around the main isleta, and portions of the San Juan Bay, the San Antonio Channel (Caño San Antonio) and the Condado Lagoon.

Despite being located in an islet, the barrio is relatively hilly and rocky, with only the eastern and southern coasts being relatively flat. Due to the continuous levels development of the fortification systems across the islet, its topography has drastically changed throughout its history. At approximately 140 feet (42 m) of elevation above sea level, the former highest point of both the barrio and the islet was located at the promontory of El Morro at the northeastern tip of the islet, now occupied by the Castillo San Felipe del Morro. Another former highest point was located at the current Castillo San Cristóbal. Other elevations include Loma de los Vientos located near the Capitol of Puerto Rico, and Las Ánimas Hill (Loma de las Ánimas), which at 128 feet (39 m) is the highest still-existing natural point of the islet. Although several man-made ditches and drainage systems have been built throughout its history, no natural rivers, creeks or bodies of fresh water have ever existed in San Juan Antiguo.

=== Cityscape ===
The urban development of San Juan Antiguo is centered around the subbarrios of Catedral, Mercado, San Cristóbal and San Francisco, located at the east-central portion of the islet of San Juan, particularly around Catedral, the location of the city's main Roman Catholic church and city hall. This urban core represents the original Spanish-founded settlement from around which the rest of the islet was populated. The subbarrios of Ballajá and Marina were later established as part of the development of the military barracks built to supply El Morro Castle and the establishment of the main port of the city of San Juan, respectively. As this urban core was walled-off throughout the development of the fortification system of San Juan, various city gates were built to allow access into the town. The land-facing gate, colloquially known as Puerta de Tierra (Spanish for 'land gate'), gave way to the westward urban sprawl in the city. This district today hosts the Capitol of Puerto Rico, and is the largest and most populated in San Juan Antiguo.

=== Subbarrios ===
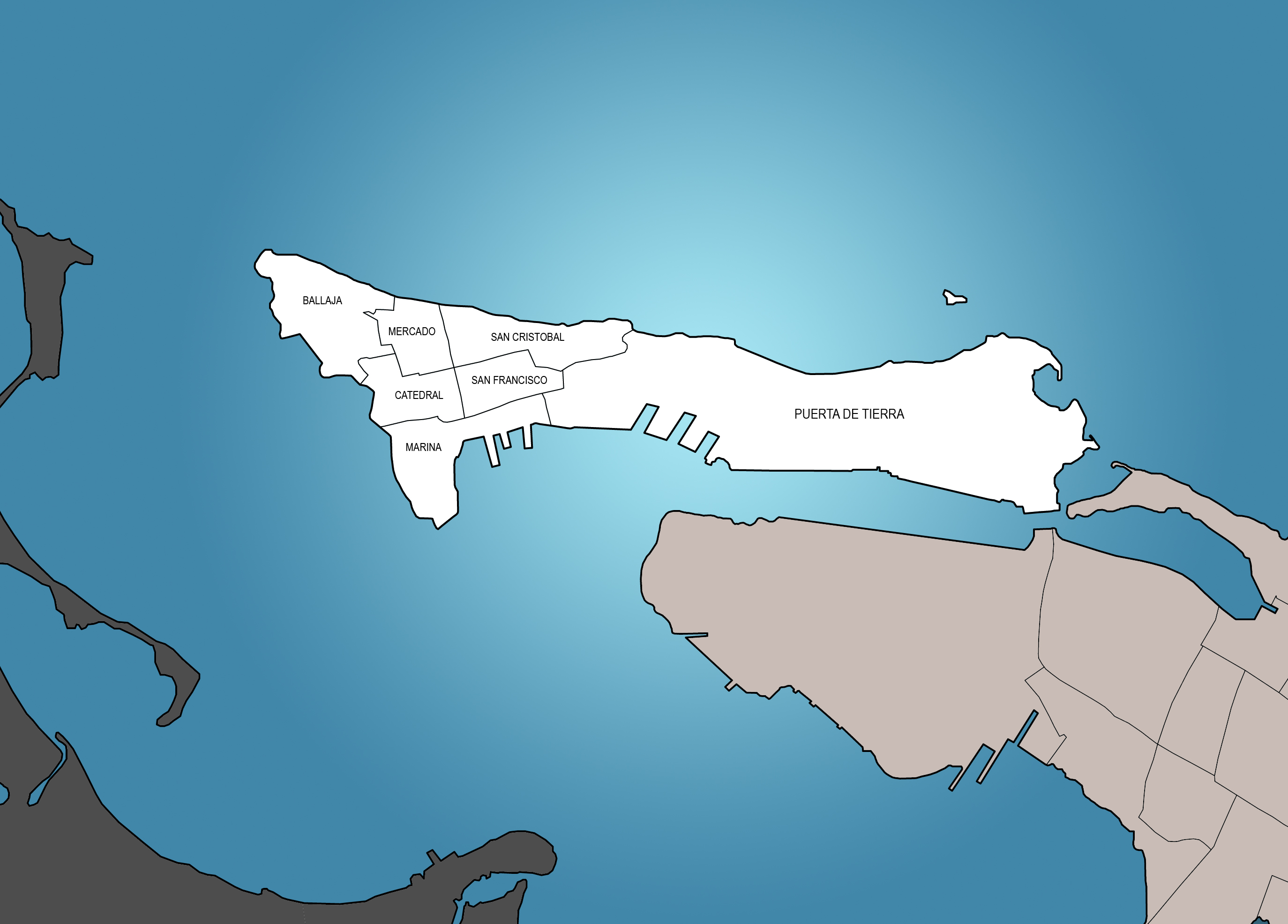
Subdivisions of San Juan Antiguo

San Juan Antiguo is divided into the following subbarrios:

1. Ballajá
2. Catedral
3. Marina
4. Mercado
5. Puerta de Tierra
6. San Cristóbal
7. San Francisco

== Demographics ==
Historical population
Census	Pop.	Note	%±
1900	17,689		—
1910	30,571		72.8%
1920	34,637		13.3%
1930	30,936		−10.7%
1940	34,381		11.1%
1950	29,760		−13.4%
1960	22,095		−25.8%
1970	13,053		−40.9%
1980	9,886		−24.3%
1990	9,696		−1.9%
2000	7,963		−17.9%
2010	7,085		−11.0%
2020	6,383		−9.9%
U.S. Decennial Census; 1900 (uses 1899 data) 1910-1930; 1930-1950 1980-2000 2010

Throughout its history, San Juan Antiguo was the most densely populated area of the city of San Juan. Its population peaked at 34,637 inhabitants as recorded in the 1920 Census. This changed during the second half of the 20th century, at a time when the city's metropolitan area was growing substantially due to the development of then suburbs such as Río Piedras, Bayamón and Carolina. In 2020, San Juan Antiguo had a population of 6,383 inhabitants and a population density of 2,400 people per km^{2}.

== Transportation ==
San Juan Antiguo is accessible via a network of roads and bridges that connect the islet to the rest of the San Juan metropolitan area. The San Antonio and Dos Hermanos Bridges link the barrio to Santurce and the main island of Puerto Rico. Public transportation includes AMA buses and the free municipal trolley system, which circulates throughout Old San Juan and Puerta de Tierra, providing access to key landmarks and government buildings. While no Tren Urbano stations exist within San Juan Antiguo, nearby Sagrado Corazón station in Santurce offer bus connections between the barrio and the broader metro area. The narrow, historic streets and limited parking encourage walking and the use of the public trolley system, especially within the colonial core. The Port of San Juan, located along the southern waterfront, serves as a major hub for cruise ships and maritime freight. The Cataño Ferry offers service to the nearby town and municipality of Cataño. Former ferry services included connection to Hato Rey and its Tren Urbano station.

== Economy and tourism ==
Between the 1950s and the 1980s, the barrio suffered from rapid social, economic and urban decline. This was evident not only in the visual urban blight but also in the physical decay of its historical buildings and fortifications. Revitalization came with the establishment of the San Juan National Historic Site and its designation, along with La Fortaleza, as a UNESCO World Heritage Site in 1983. Cultural, urban and economic redevelopment came shortly after as part of the incoming 500th anniversary of the European discovery and Spanish conquest of Puerto Rico and the America. In addition to the National Historic Site, the entirety of the cultural heritage of the isleta is federally protected today, with its eastern side designated as the Old San Juan National Historic Landmark District, and its western side designated as the Puerta de Tierra Historic District, all of them listed in the United States National Register of Historic Places.

== Notable natives and residents ==
- Juan de Amézqueta
- Félix Arenas Gaspar
- Juan Alejo de Arizmendi
- José Campeche
- Miguel Enríquez
- Alonso Manso
- María de las Mercedes Barbudo
- Luis Muñoz Marín
- Luis Padial
- Juan Ponce de León II
- Ramón Power y Giralt
- Luis Sánchez Morales
- Diego de Torres Vargas

== Gallery ==
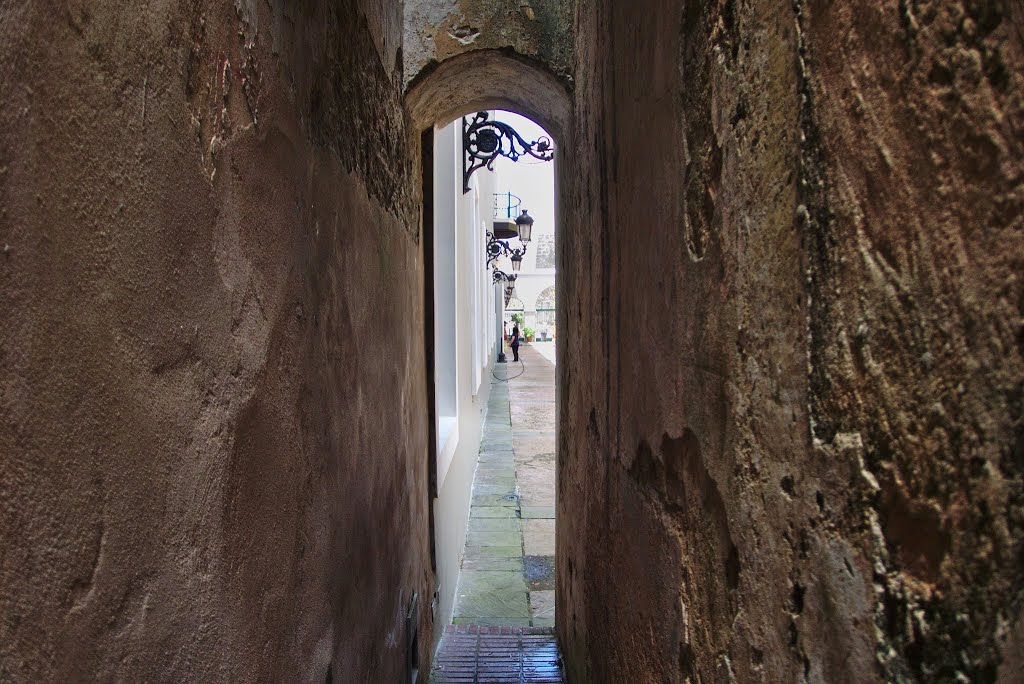
Scene in Marina, a subbarrio of San Juan Antiguo

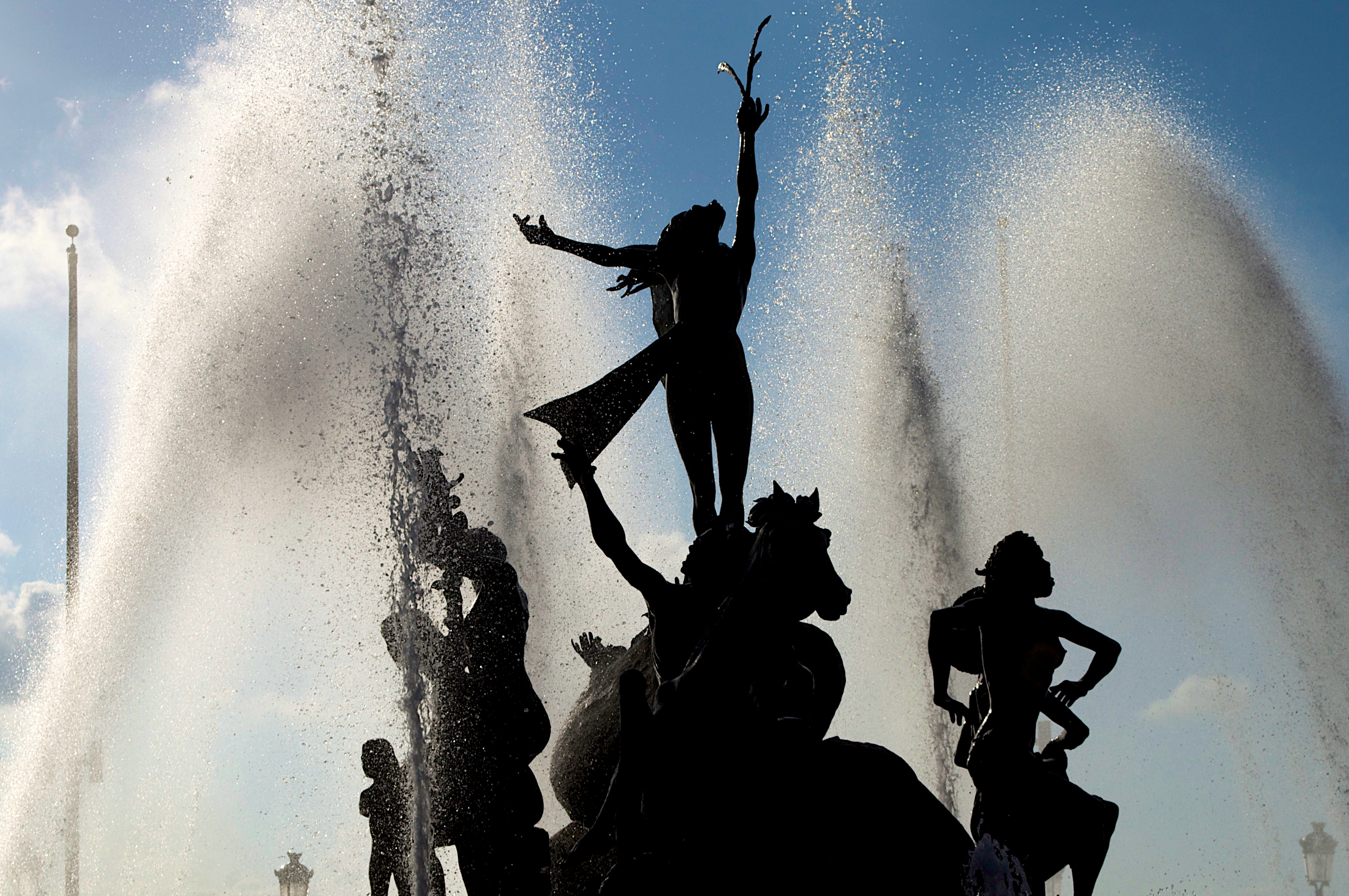
Statue in Marina, a subbarrio of San Juan Antiguo

== See also ==
- Isleta de San Juan
- Avenida Juan Ponce de León
- List of communities in Puerto Rico
