= Iglesia de San Francisco (Avilés) =

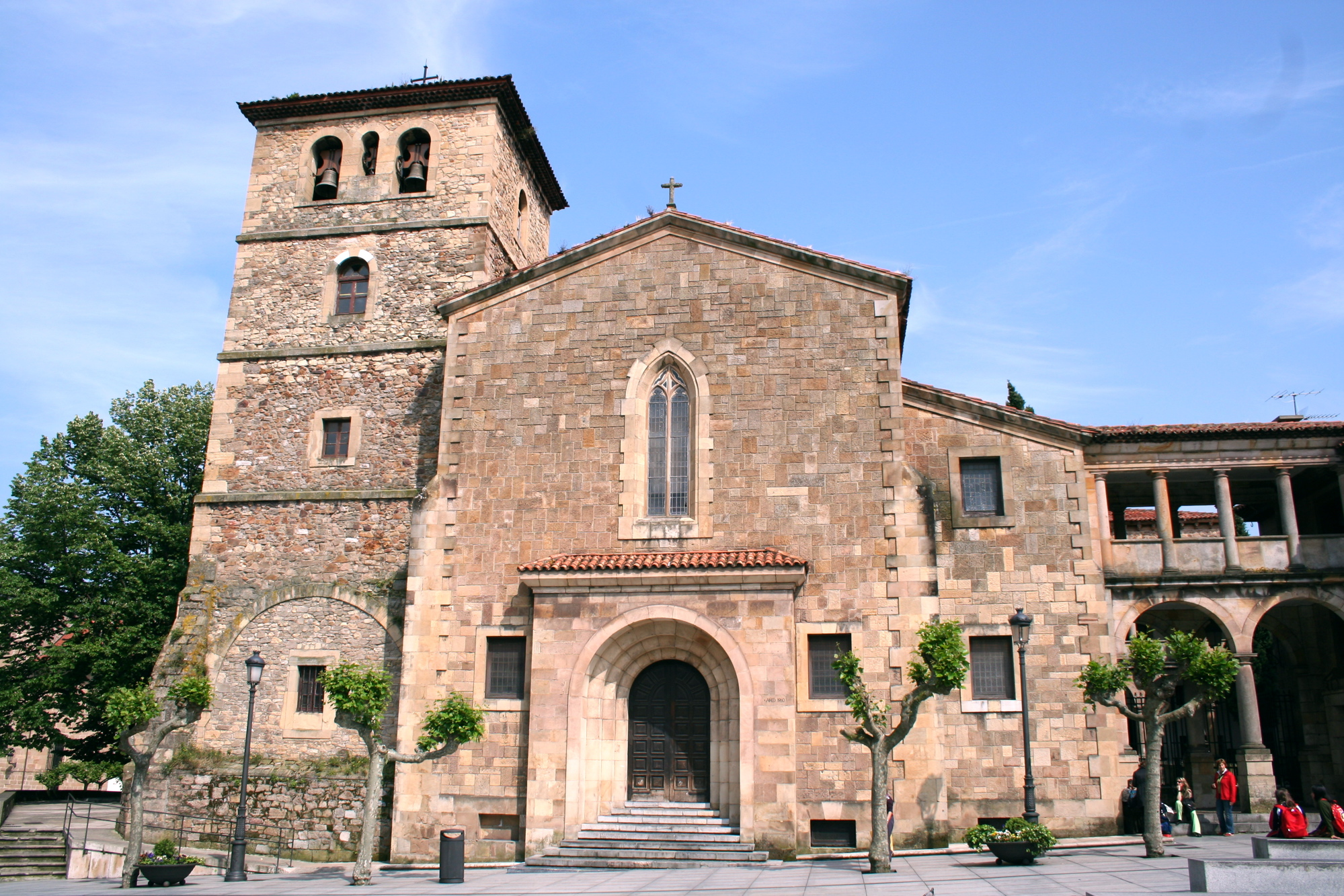
- Iglesia de San Francisco (Avilés)
- Location: Asturias, Spain

Iglesia de San Francisco (Avilés) is a church in Asturias, Spain. It was once a Franciscan convent.

== See also ==
- Asturian art
- Catholic Church in Spain
- Churches in Asturias
- List of oldest church buildings
