= Church of San Francesco =

The entry Church of San Francesco includes churches linked to the devotion to St Francis of Assisi (San Francesco in Italian) and the Franciscan order. They mainly include churches or monasteries in the Italian peninsula in the following cities/towns and regions:

- San Francesco, Acquasparta, Umbria
- San Francesco alle Scale, Ancona, Marche
- San Francesco, Arezzo, Tuscany
- San Francesco, Assisi or Basilica of Saint Francis of Assisi, Umbria
- San Francesco, Atri, Abruzzo
- San Francesco, Bologna or Basilica of San Francesco, Bologna, Reggio-Emilia
- San Francesco, Canicattì, Sicily
- San Francesco, Casalbuttano, Lombardy
- San Francesco, Cortona, Tuscany
- San Francesco di Paola, Florence, Tuscany
- San Francesco, Grosseto, Tuscany
- San Francesco, Larino, Molise
- San Francesco, Lucca, Tuscany
- San Francesco, Lucignano, Tuscany
- San Francesco, Mantua, Lombardy
- San Francesco, Modena, Emilia Romagna
- San Francesco, Mondavio, Marche
- San Francesco delle Monache, Naples, Campania
- San Francesco di Paola, Naples, Campania
- San Francesco, Orvieto, Umbria
- San Francesco, Palermo or San Francesco d'Assisi, Palermo, Sicily
- San Francesco, Pescia, Tuscany
- San Francesco, Piacenza, Emilia Romagna
- San Francesco, Pisa, Tuscany
- San Francesco, Prato, Tuscany
- Santissime Stimmate di San Francesco, Rome, Lazio
- San Francesco a Ripa, Rome, Lazio
- San Francesco, San Gemini, Umbria
- San Francesco, San Marino, San Marino
- San Francesco, Siena or Basilica of San Francesco, Siena, Tuscany,
- San Francesco, Urbania, Marche
- San Francesco della Vigna, Venice, Veneto
- San Francesco, Viterbo, Lazio
- San Francesco, Terni, Umbria

== See also ==
- Iglesia de San Francisco (disambiguation)
