= St. Francis of Assisi Catholic Church (Jefferson, North Carolina) =

Saint Francis of Assisi Catholic Church

Religion
- Affiliation: Roman Catholic Church
- Diocese: Roman Catholic Diocese of Charlotte
- Rite: Latin Rite
- Leadership: Bishop Michael Thomas Martin OFM Conv.
- Year consecrated: 2014

Location
- Location: Luther Road, Jefferson, North Carolina, United States
- State: North Carolina
- Interactive map of Saint Francis of Assisi Catholic Church
- Coordinates: 36°25′0.5″N 81°27′13.5″W

Architecture
- Groundbreaking: 2011

St. Francis of Assisi Catholic Church is a Roman Catholic church in Jefferson, North Carolina.

== History ==
In 1962 Bishop Vincent Waters of Raleigh instructed for the Diocese to purchase the former Jefferson Presbyterian Church building on Main Street, which had been built in 1899, for $12,000 in order to create a new church for the growing Catholic community in Ashe County. The formal dedication ceremony for St. Francis Church was held on August 27, 1963. The parish began as a mission of Saint Elizabeth of the Hill Country Catholic Church of Boone, North Carolina. In the 1970s additions were made to the church building. On September 25, 1985, Bishop John F. Donoghue of Charlotte dedicated the new hall of the church. In 1990, a house next to the church was purchased and converted into a rectory. In September 1994, renovation work on the church was completed, including a new main altar, blessed sacrament table, and stained glass windows which were all made by parishioners. St. Francis of Rome Catholic Church in Sparta, North Carolina is a mission of St. Francis of Assisi Church.

By 2014 St. Francis, still the only Catholic church in the county, had 277 families and had outgrown the 1899 building. It built a new church on a 15-acre site on Luther Road; Father James Stuhrenberg expressed regret about leaving the Main St church. Bishop Peter Joseph Jugis and Congresswoman Virginia Foxx attended the September 29, 2012, groundbreaking.

St. Francis has been active in assisting needy migrant workers who began coming to the County in the late 20th century as seasonal laborers in the Christmas tree farms, and became permanent residents in growing numbers over the decades.
