= San Francesco D'Assisi, Calascibetta =

Baroque Roman Catholic church

Coordinates: 37.°N 14.°E

San Francesco d'Assisi is a Roman Catholic church in the town of Calascibetta, in the region of Sicily, Italy.

== History and description ==
The church and an attached Capuchin order convent was erected in 1589 at this site, which formerly was a Jewish neighborhood. A prior convent belonging to the Franciscan Order of Friars Minor Capuchin was erected in 1534 in the valley between this town an Enna. During the following centuries this convent typically housed about 30 friars. In 1866, the convent was suppressed. The church remained in possession of the local clerics. Within a few decades, a few Capuchins from Enna were able to repossess the convent, and that has continued till the 21st century.

The church underwent some restoration from 1923 to 1927. The stone facade is simple, with a rectangular portal and a central oculus. The church has a single nave with lateral altars. One of the chapels houses the relics of Padre Simone Napoli. The others have icons for veneration. The sacristy has a 17th-century wooden tabernacle, and the library contains a collection of antique books, some as old as 1500. The main altarpiece, depicting an Adoration of the Magi is by Filippo Paladini.
