= Church of San Francisco, Ceuta =

Church in the Spanish city of Ceuta

Coordinates: 35°53′13″N 5°18′32″W

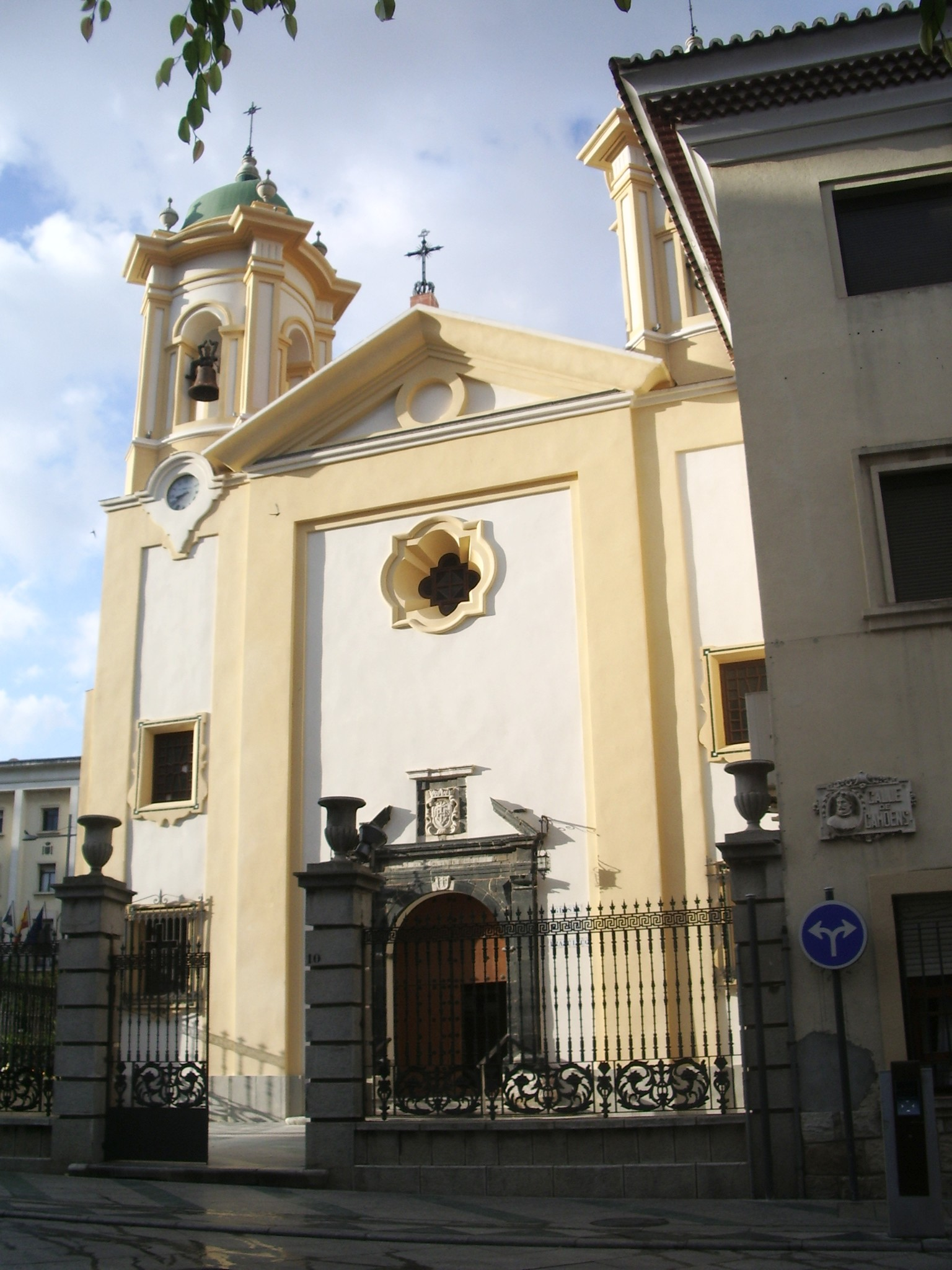
Iglesia de San Francisco

Iglesia de San Francisco is a church in the Spanish city of Ceuta, bordering northern Morocco. It stands at the side of the Plaza de los Reyes, and is a distinctive Baroque twin-towered yellow building. It was built in the early eighteenth century in honour of the Holy Cross and is noted for its Baroque altarpieces and images of the Virgin and Christ.
