= Saint Francis of Assisi Cathedral =

Saint Francis of Assisi Cathedral may refer to:

- St. Francis of Assisi Cathedral (Metuchen, New Jersey)
- Cathedral Basilica of St. Francis of Assisi, Santa Fe, New Mexico
- Saint Francis of Assisi Church, Aleppo a Latin Catholic church in Aleppo, Syria

== See also ==
- St. Francis of Assisi Church (disambiguation)
