= Mercado, Old San Juan =

Subbarrio of San Juan Antiguo in Puerto Rico

Mercado
- Subbarrio
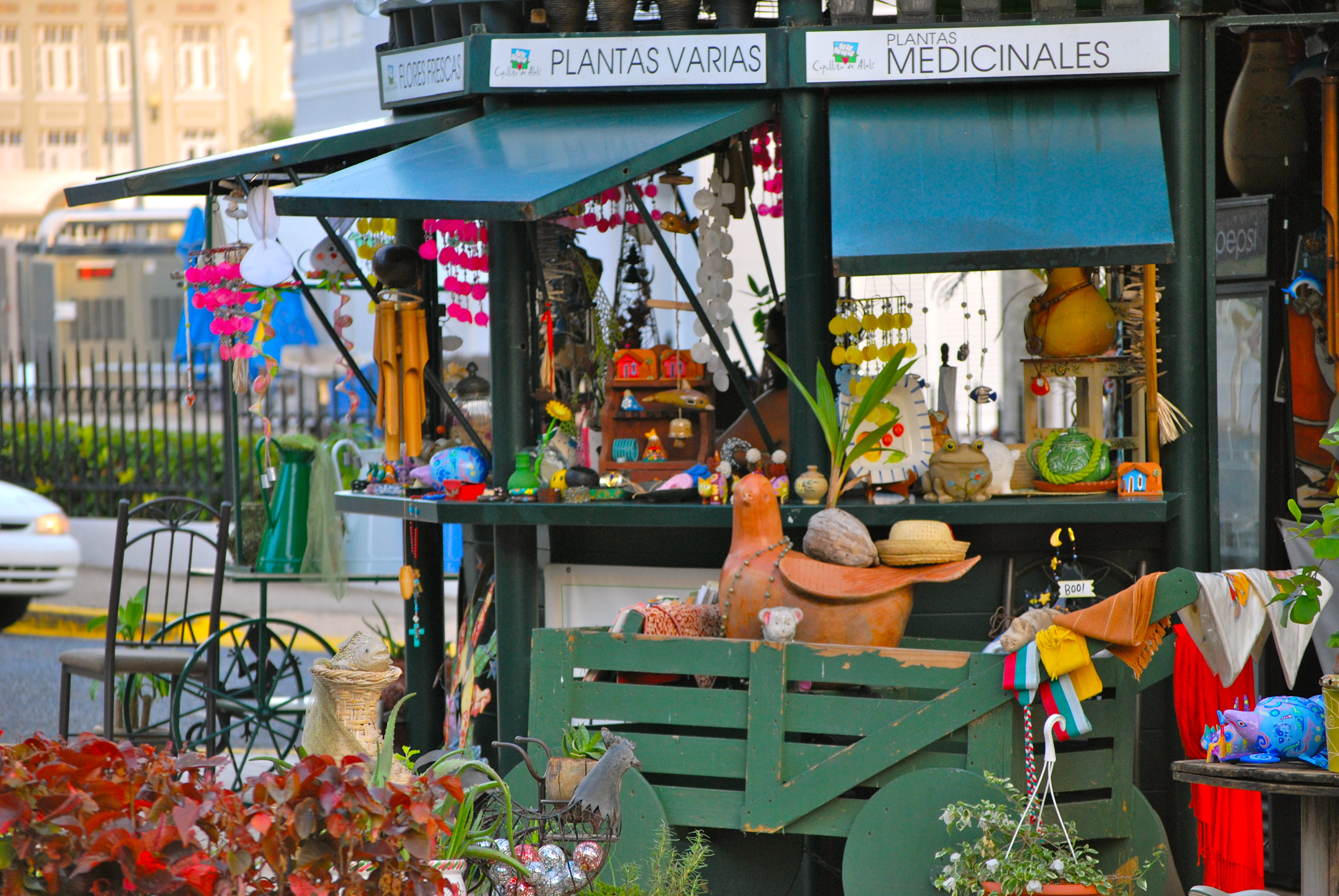
- Kiosk in Mercado, San Juan Antiguo

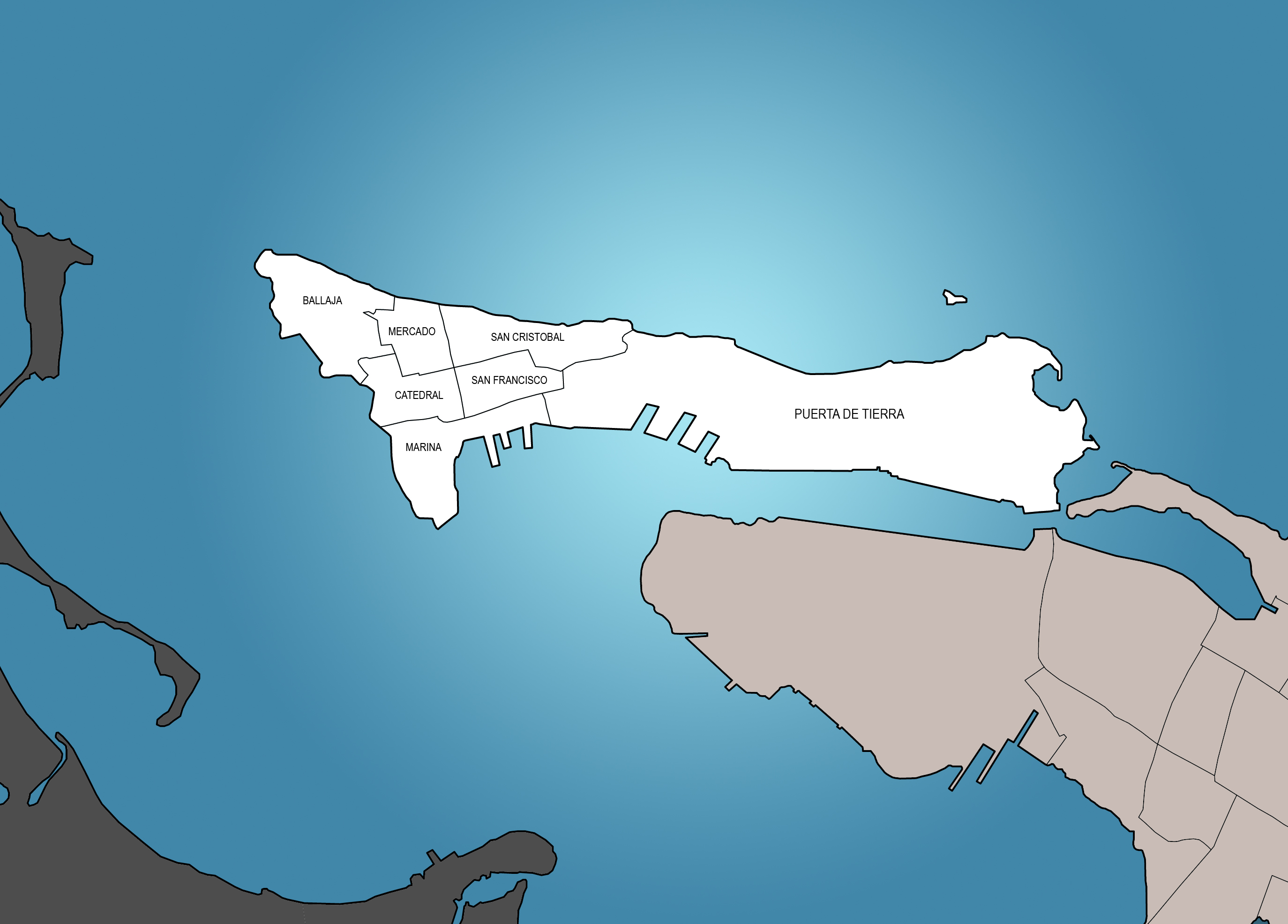
- Mercado is in San Juan Antiguo

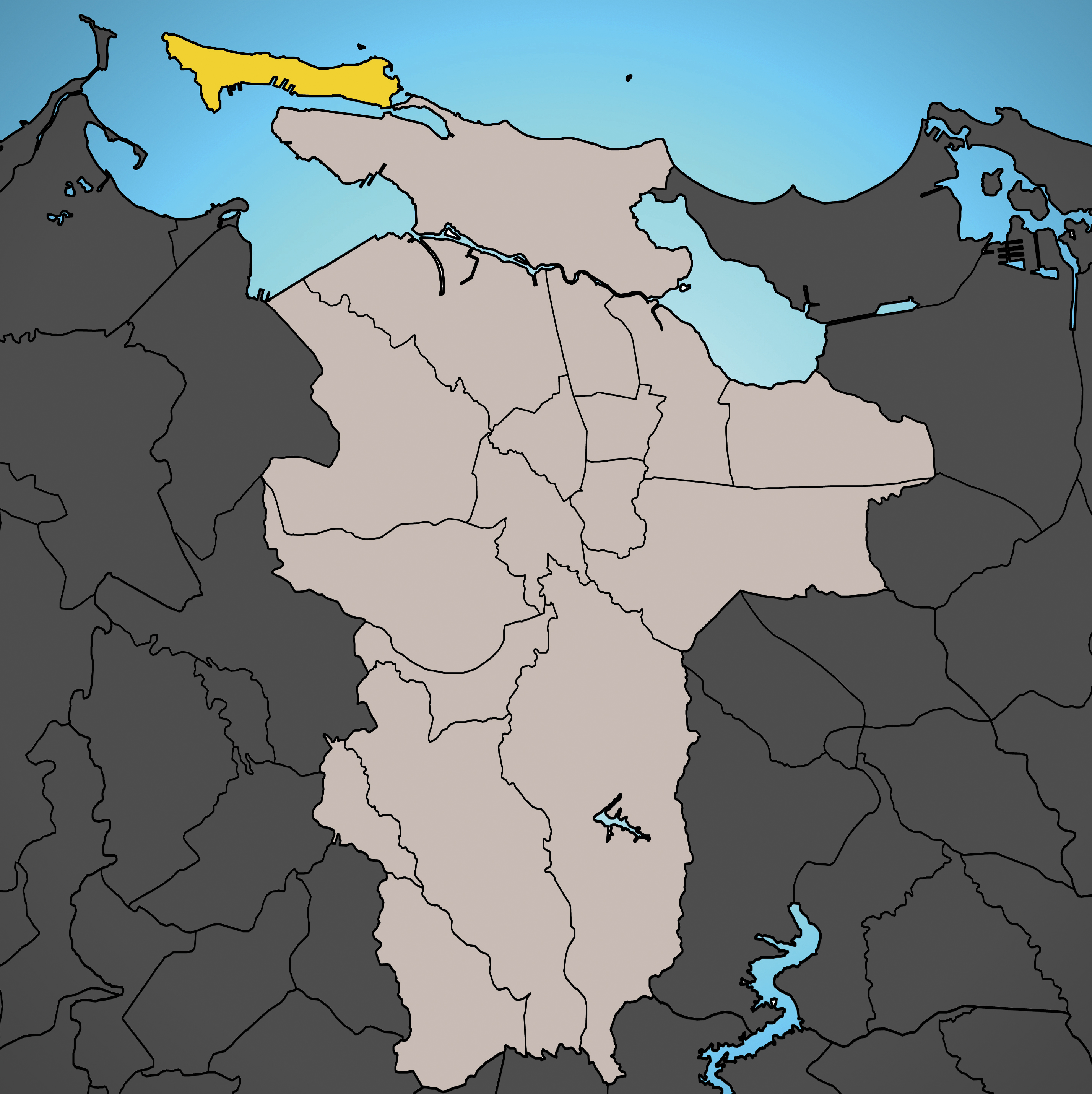
- San Juan Antiguo is in San Juan

- San Juan is in Puerto Rico
- Coordinates: 18.4694956°N 66.1174290°W
- Commonwealth: Puerto Rico
- Municipality: San Juan
- Barrio: San Juan Antiguo

Mercado is one of 7 subbarrios of the San Juan Antiguo barrio in the municipality of San Juan in Puerto Rico. Mercado (Spanish for 'marketplace) is named after Old San Juan's main marketplace, which used to be located there. It is one of the six subbarrios which form part of the Old San Juan Historic District.

Half of La Perla is located within the borders of the Mercado subbarrio, the other half is located in the neighboring subbarrio, San Cristóbal.

== History ==
Along with subbarrios Catedral, San Cristóbal and San Francisco, Mercado is one of the four districts that represent the original boundaries of the Spanish walled settlement of San Juan during the 16th century. The population of the subbarrio subsequently grew around the Church of San José and the Convent of Saint Thomas Aquinas, established between 1523 and 1528. Originally known as Barrio de Santa Bárbara, Mercado was one of the five barrios that constituted the city of San Juan in 1845. It subsequently became a subbarrio of Barrio de San Juan (today San Juan Antiguo barrio) when Santurce was annexed to San Juan and the previous barrios were dissolved in 1863. As hinted by its name, the main marketplace of the city of San Juan used to be located in this subbarrio. This marketplace functioned until the early 20th century and, with its closure during this time, the nearby slaughterhouses and nearby freed slave houses subsequently developed into the modern community of La Perla. The marketplace today hosts the Museum of San Juan, having been established in 1979 it is the oldest municipal museum in Puerto Rico.

The United States took control of Puerto Rico from Spain in the aftermath of the Spanish–American War under the terms of the Treaty of Paris of 1898. In 1899, the United States conducted its first census of Puerto Rico, finding that the population of Mercado was 2,038.

== Demographics ==
Historical population
Census	Pop.	Note	%±
1900	2,038		—
1910	4,441		117.9%
1920	4,477		0.8%
1930	5,880		31.3%
1940	7,853		33.6%
1950	7,594		−3.3%
1980	884		—
1990	1,218		37.8%
2000	1,018		−16.4%
U.S. Decennial Census; 1900 (uses 1899 data) 1910-1930; 1930-1950 1980-2000 2010

== Cityscape ==
=== Places of interest ===
- La Perla
- Old Marketplace of San Juan
  - Museum of San Juan
- Pablo Casals Museum
- Puerto Rico Institute of Neurobiology
- San José Church
- San Juan National Historic Site
  - Las Ánimas Bastion
- Santo Tomás de Aquino Convent
  - Puerto Rico National Gallery

=== Main streets and squares ===
- Calle de la Cruz
- Calle del Cristo
- Calle del Sol
- Norzagaray Street
- Plaza de San José
- Plaza del Quinto Centenario
- San Sebastián Street

== See also ==
- List of communities in Puerto Rico
