= San Cristóbal, Old San Juan =

Subbarrio of San Juan Antiguo in Puerto Rico

San Cristóbal
- Subbarrio
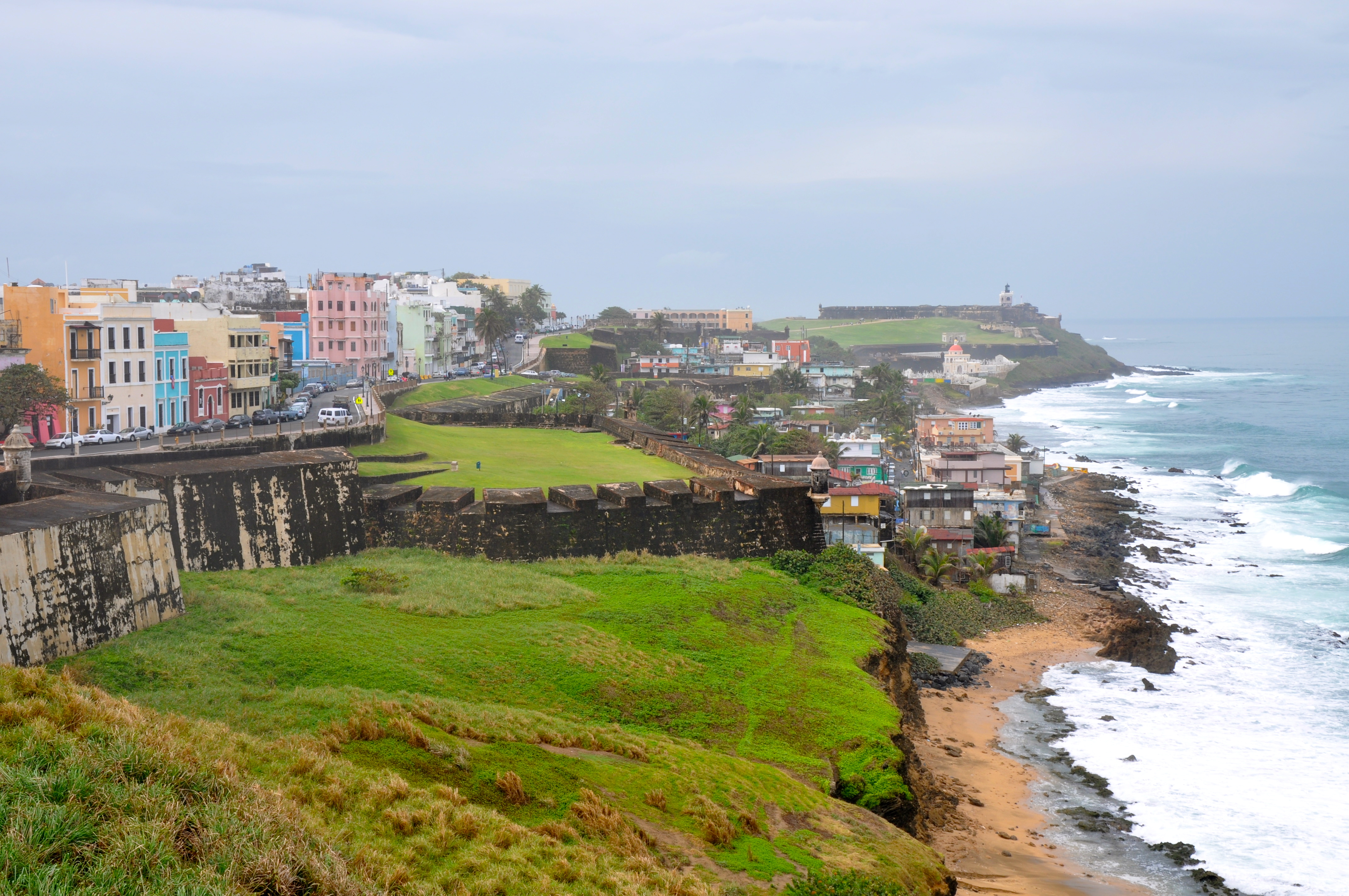
- San Cristóbal in Old San Juan

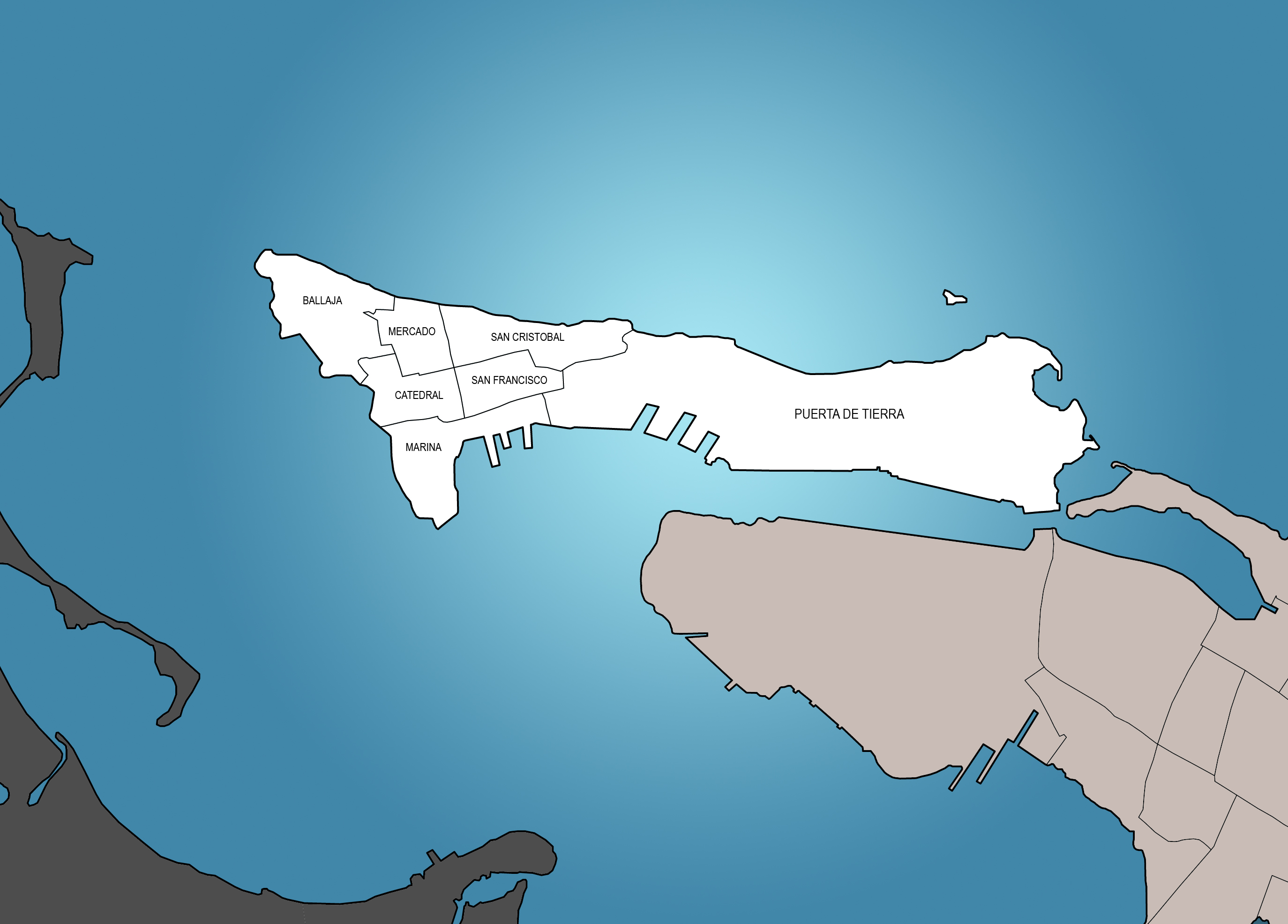
- San Cristóbal is in San Juan Antiguo

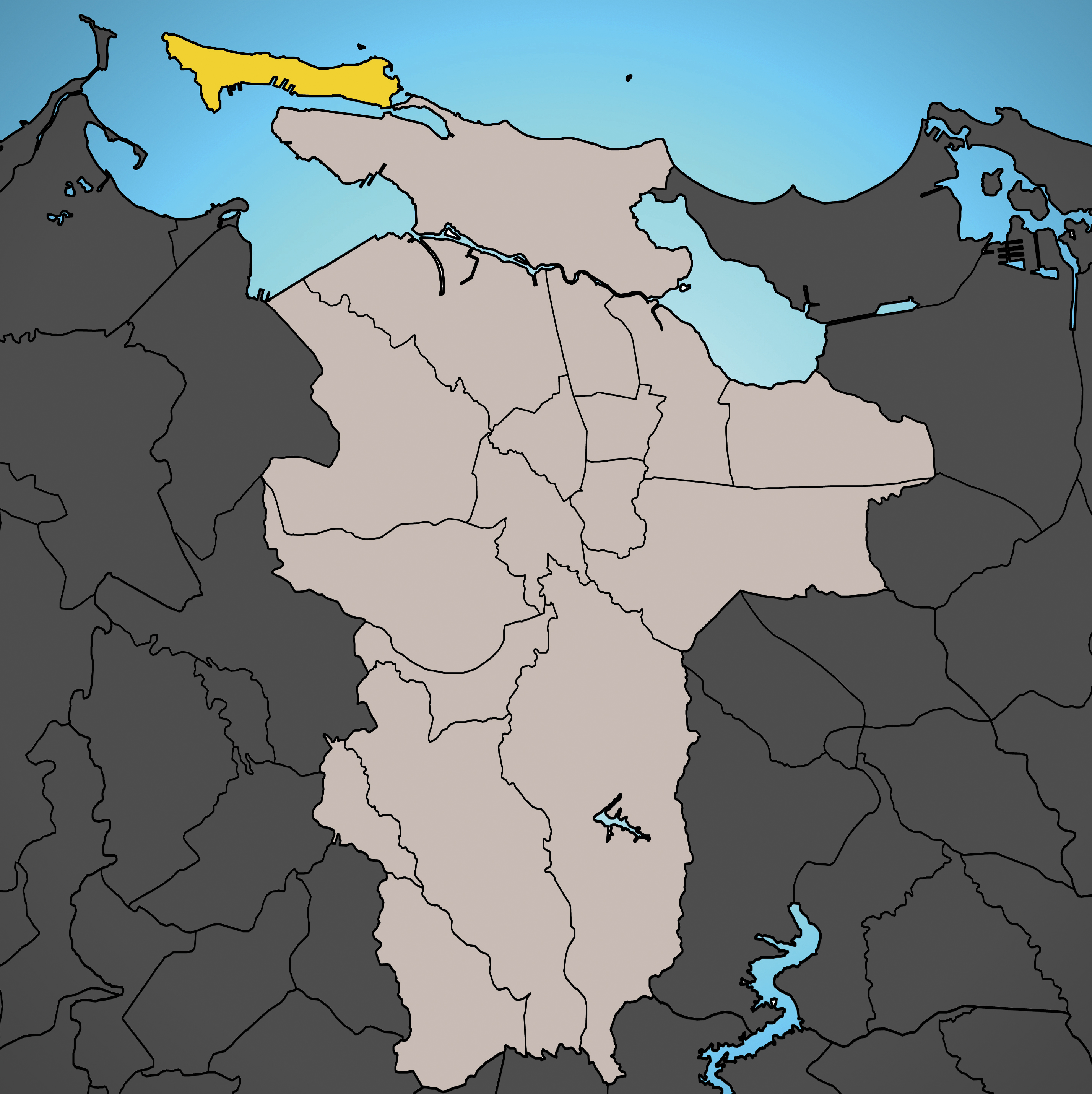
- San Juan Antiguo is in San Juan

- San Juan is in Puerto Rico
- Coordinates: 18.4692798°N 66.1118660°W
- Commonwealth: Puerto Rico
- Municipality: San Juan
- Barrio: San Juan Antiguo

Population (1990)
  - Total: 1,358
- Source: Census 1990

San Cristóbal is one of the seven subbarrios of the San Juan Antiguo barrio in the municipality of San Juan in Puerto Rico. San Cristóbal, named after Castillo San Cristóbal, is one of the six subbarrios which form part of the Old San Juan Historic District. Half of La Perla is located within the borders of the San Cristóbal subbarrio, the other half is located in the neighboring subbarrio, Mercado.

== History ==
The subbarrio San Cristóbal was one of the original four barrios of San Juan before the annexations of Santurce in 1863. During this time it was known as Barrio de Santa Bárbara, named after the former Santa Bárbara de la Cruz Hermitage (Hermita de Santa Bárbara de la Cruz), a former monastery which in turn is the namesake of the modern Calle de la Cruz, and the Santa Bárbara Bastion (Bastión de Santa Bárbara), a former artillery battery located where La Perla is now.

Puerto Rico was ceded by Spain in the aftermath of the Spanish–American War under the terms of the Treaty of Paris of 1898 and became an unincorporated territory of the United States. In 1899, the United States Department of War conducted a census of Puerto Rico finding that the population of San Cristóbal was 3,131. In 2010, the population of San Cristóbal was 1,230.

== Demographics ==
Historical population
| Census | Pop. | Note | %± |
|---|---|---|---|
| 1900 | 3,131 | | — |
| 1910 | 3,170 | | 1.2% |
| 1920 | 3,523 | | 11.1% |
| 1930 | 3,394 | | −3.7% |
| 1940 | 5,683 | | 67.4% |
| 1950 | 4,715 | | −17.0% |
| 1980 | 1,899 | | — |
| 1990 | 1,390 | | −26.8% |
| 2000 | 1,221 | | −12.2% |
U.S. Decennial Census; 1900 (uses 1899 data) 1910-1930; 1930-1950 1980-2000 2010

== Cityscape ==
=== Places of interest ===
- La Perla
- San Juan National Historic Site
  - Castillo San Cristóbal
  - San Sebastián and Santo Tomás Bastions

=== Main streets and squares ===
- Calle de la Luna
- Calle de la Tanca
- Calle del Sol
- Norzagaray Street
- San Justo Street
- San Sebastián Street
