= No Hay Igual =

Single by Nelly Furtado

from the album Loose
- Language: Spanish
- A-side: "All Good Things (Come to an End)"
- Released: April 11, 2006
- Recorded: 2005
- Studio: Hit Factory Criteria (Miami)
- Genre: Hip hop; reggaeton
- Length: 3:35
- Label: Geffen; Mosley
- Songwriters: Nelly Furtado; Timbaland; Danja; Nisan Stewart
- Producers: Timbaland; Danja; Nisan Stewart

Nelly Furtado singles chronology
"The Grass Is Green" (2005)	"No Hay Igual" (2006)	"Promiscuous" (2006)

Music video
- "No Hay Igual" on YouTube

"No Hay Igual" ("There Is No Equal") is a song by Canadian singer-songwriter Nelly Furtado from her third studio album, Loose (2006). It was written and produced by Furtado, Tim "Timbaland" Mosley, Nate "Danja" Hills, and Nisan Stewart, with vocal production by Jim Beanz. While working with Timbaland and Danja at The Hit Factory in Miami, Florida, Pharrell Williams introduced Furtado to reggaeton, a musical genre that was unfamiliar to her. After he played a song for her, Furtado became inspired and wrote the lyrics to "No Hay Igual" "nearly on the spot". It is a hip-hop and reggaeton song in which Furtado sings in Spanish over a reggaeton rhythm.

"No Hay Igual" was released as the lead single from Loose on April 11, 2006, by Geffen Records. Overall, it received positive reviews from music critics with some of them calling the song a highlight on Loose and praising its production. A music video for the remix of "No Hay Igual" with Calle 13 was shot in La Perla, San Juan, Puerto Rico. The video features Furtado and Calle 13's Residente in various situations throughout the slum astride such as eating ice cream and playing pool. Furtado performed a medley of "No Hay Igual" with "Party" (Whoa, Nelly!, 2002) on the Get Loose Tour in 2007. The live performance was included on Furtado's first live album Loose: The Concert (2007).

== Writing and recording ==
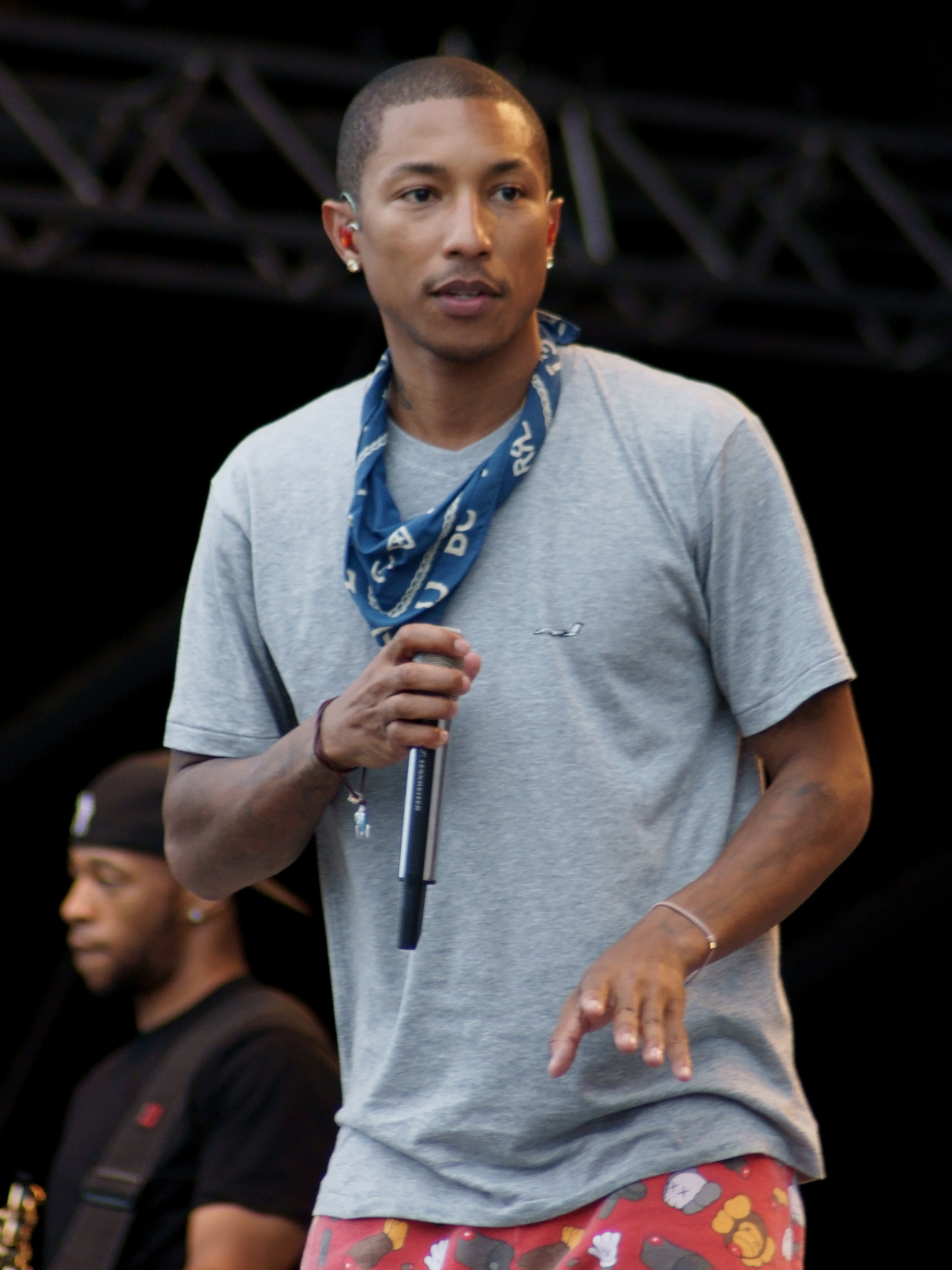
Pharrell Williams introduced Furtado to reggaeton while she was working with Timbaland and Danja in Miami.

In August 2005, when it came time for Furtado to "lay down the tracks" for her third studio album Loose, she turned to hip-hop producer Timbaland, who she previously collaborated with on the remix to Missy Elliott's "Get Ur Freak On" (2001) and on Ms. Jade's single "Ching Ching" (2002). Interscope Records president Jimmy Iovine suggested Furtado work with Timbaland and played her a few of Timbaland's latest productions, which she responded positively to. According to Furtado, "It sound[ed] like he's listening to all the same stuff as me — everything from System of a Down to Bloc Party and Death from Above 1979, and a lot of Coldplay, too". "Within no time", the two were working on music at The Hit Factory Criteria in Miami, Florida, alongside Timbaland's protege Danja. There, they produced ten of Loose's thirteen tracks.

According to Furtado, in the studio, Timbaland had some beats that were "already kind of halfway there; and then he had beats that he just had nucleuses of; and then other stuff we jammed together". While she was working with Timbaland and Danja in Miami, Pharrell Williams introduced Furtado to reggaeton, a musical genre that was unfamiliar to her. After he played a song for her, Furtado became inspired and wrote the lyrics to "No Hay Igual" "nearly on the spot". In an interview with MTV News, Furtado joked: "Supposedly it was Pharrell's idea for me to work with Tim [...] Jimmy Iovine, the head of my record label [Interscope], might beg to differ."

"No Hay Igual" was produced by Timbaland, Danja, and Nisan Stewart. It was recorded, mixed, and engineered by Demacio "Demo" Castellon at The Hit Factory Criteria in Miami and Thomas Crown Studios in Virginia Beach. Additional recording of the song was provided by Marcella "Ms. Lago" Araica. Jim Beanz provided the production of Furtado's vocals. James Roach, Kobla Tetey, Ben Jost and Vadim Chislov acted as second engineers to the song. Stewart provided the drums, while Danja played the keyboards together with Timbaland, who also added the percussion. Background vocals were provided by Furtado and Beanz.

== Composition and response ==
"No Hay Igual" is a hip-hop and reggaeton song, with a length of three minutes and thirty-five seconds. It is a Spanglish tongue twister over "future-tropic" beats. The song contains a "sharp mix" of percussion and "empowered chanting". In "No Hay Igual", Furtado sings in Spanish over a reggaeton rhythm. According to Sean Fennessey, the song is called reggaeton "because it's sung in Spanish and isn't salsa, is an aerial assault". Fennessey wrote that the song "never wears down the listener" and "uses a few vocal change-ups, unlike the much-maligned genre it's been compared to". Stephen Thomas Erlewine of Allmusic wrote that in the song, Furtado "plays the world traveler", where she deftly blends reggaeton and M.I.A." According to Will Hermes of Entertainment Weekly, "No Hay Igual" is a "reggaeton-style trifle" that is "more fun than anything else" on Loose.

Barry Schwartz of Stylus Magazine called "No Hay Igual" one of Loose's "indisputable highlights". He wrote that Furtado and Timbaland are "absolutely ripping reggaeton" better than "nearly everyone who actually does reggaeton". Allmusic's senior editor Stephen Thomas Erlewine picked it as one of the best tracks on the album, alongside "Maneater", "Promiscuous" and "Te Busqué". Robert Christgau wrote a positive review for The Village Voice and said that the song "might accomplish God's great plan on the dance-floor." Rob Sheffield from Rolling Stone highlighted the song, calling it a "reggaeton rip". While praising the song, Slant Magazine's Jonathan Keefe commented that the song "makes Rihanna sound all the more shrill and unnecessary." John Murphy from MusicOMH perceived that it has "a similar vibe to Gwen Stefani's Hollaback Girl– after a while it proves a bit annoying, but it's catchy enough."

== Music video ==
A music video for the remix of "No Hay Igual" was filmed on June 26, 2006, in La Perla shantytown located in San Juan, Puerto Rico. Rene Perez, of Calle 13, said he hoped that the video would help them both reach new audiences: "It's a good opportunity for us both. More than the North American market, the European market really interests me and her because her family is Portuguese." The video was directed by Israel Lugo and Gabriel Coss, photographed by Sonnel Velazquez and produced by María Estades.

The video starts with Furtado walking under a stone bridge near an icon of Jesus Christ. As the video progresses she continues to walk and starts singing the song's lyrics. She then arrives at a building where Pérez is on the balcony putting his shirt on while Furtado interpreters the lyrics referring to him. He then starts joining her as other residents start starring at them. Scenes are intercut with both of them at a pastry shop, seductively eating ice cream. Then, Pérez is shown at an underground graffiti place rapping his verse on the song. Further scenes are intercut with both of them at a club playing pool. Later, the video intersperses scenes of Furtado and Pérez dancing while performing the song, crowded with other people around them. The video ends with both of them walking towards the bridge on an early morning.

== Track listings ==
- 12" vinyl
1. "No Hay Igual" — 3:37
2. "No Hay Igual" (instrumental) — 3:37
- Digital download
1. "No Hay Igual" — 3:38
- Digital download (remix)
1. "No Hay Igual" (featuring Calle 13) — 3:41

== Credits and personnel ==
Recording and mixing

- Recorded at The Hit Factory Criteria, Miami, Florida
- Mixed at Thomas Crown Studios, Virginia Beach, Virginia

Personnel

- Lyrics – Nelly Furtado
- Songwriting – Nelly Furtado, Tim Mosley, Nate Hills and Nisan Stewart
- Production – Timbaland and Danja
- Vocal production – Jim Beanz
- Drums – Nisan Stewart
- Keyboards – Danja and Timbaland
- Percussion – Timbaland
- Background vocals – Nelly Furtado and Jim Beanz
- Recording – Demacio "Demo" Castellon
- Engineering – Demacio "Demo" Castellon
- Mixing – Demacio "Demo" Castellon
- Second engineering – James Roach, Kobla Tetey, Ben Jost and Vadim Chislov
- Additional recording – Marcella "Ms. Lago" Araica

Credits adapted from the liner notes of Loose, Mosley, Geffen.

== Charts ==
Chart (2006–2007)	Peak position
US Hot Singles Sales (Billboard)	39
US Latin Rhythm Airplay (Billboard)	38

== Release history ==
Release dates and formats for "No Hay Igual"
Region	Date	Format(s)	Label(s)	Ref.
United States	April 11, 2006	Digital download	Geffen; Mosley	
United States	April 18, 2006	12-inch vinyl	Geffen; Mosley	
