= Gabriel Coss =

- Occupation: Music video director

Gabriel Coss is a Latin Grammy Award and a Regional Emmy Award-winner music video director. Coss also has credits for directing the documentaries Aljuriya (2004), Sonó, Sonó, Tité Curet!!! (2011) and Armonía (Doctv Latinoamérica 2014). In 2005, Coss launched 939 Films with Israel Lugo, which they merged with Rojo Chiringa Films in 2007.

Coss was awarded the Best Short Form Music Video at the 7th Latin Grammy Awards for directing "Atrévete-te-te", co-directed by Jorge "Fish" Rodríguez, and performed by Calle 13. "La Jirafa", the fourth single from Calle 13's debut album, was directed by Coss and co-directed by Israel Lugo. Coss worked again with Calle 13 on the lead single from their album Residente o Visitante in 2007. "Tango del Pecado", co-directed again with Lugo, was shot in Puerto Rico and it was described as "the story of a catastrophe, a shameless Latin-American version of a Romeo and Juliet-type of love." The video was nominated for a Latin Grammy Award in 2007 losing to "Ven a Mi Casa Esta Navidad" by Voz Veis.

Coss and Lugo directed Canadian singer-songwriter Nelly Furtado's "All Good Things (Come to an End)", in a video that "finds Furtado frolicking with a male model in Puerto Rico." About the video, Furtado stated: "It's very tropical and romantic. It reminds me of old Sarah McLachlan videos, it has that element of art to it. It's kind of like cinema." Furtado recorded with Calle 13 a remix version of "No Hay Igual" and shot a video in La Perla, San Juan, Puerto Rico also directed by Coss and Lugo.

The music video for "Bendita Tu Luz" by Mexican band Maná featuring Juan Luis Guerra was directed by Coss and Lugo and was shot at Santo Domingo in 2006. Coss and Lugo received a Latin Grammy Award for Best Short Form Music Video in 2009 for "La Perla" by Calle 13 featuring Rubén Blades which was shot at slum of the same name. The music video for "Vamo' a Portarnos Mal", included on Entren Los Que Quieran by Calle 13, was directed by Coss and Lugo in 2010, with locations on Las Monjas, Barrio Obrero and Las Gladiolas at San Juan, Puerto Rico.

Gabriel Coss holds the record for the most Latin Grammy wins as a director, with a total of two.
