= Israel Lugo =

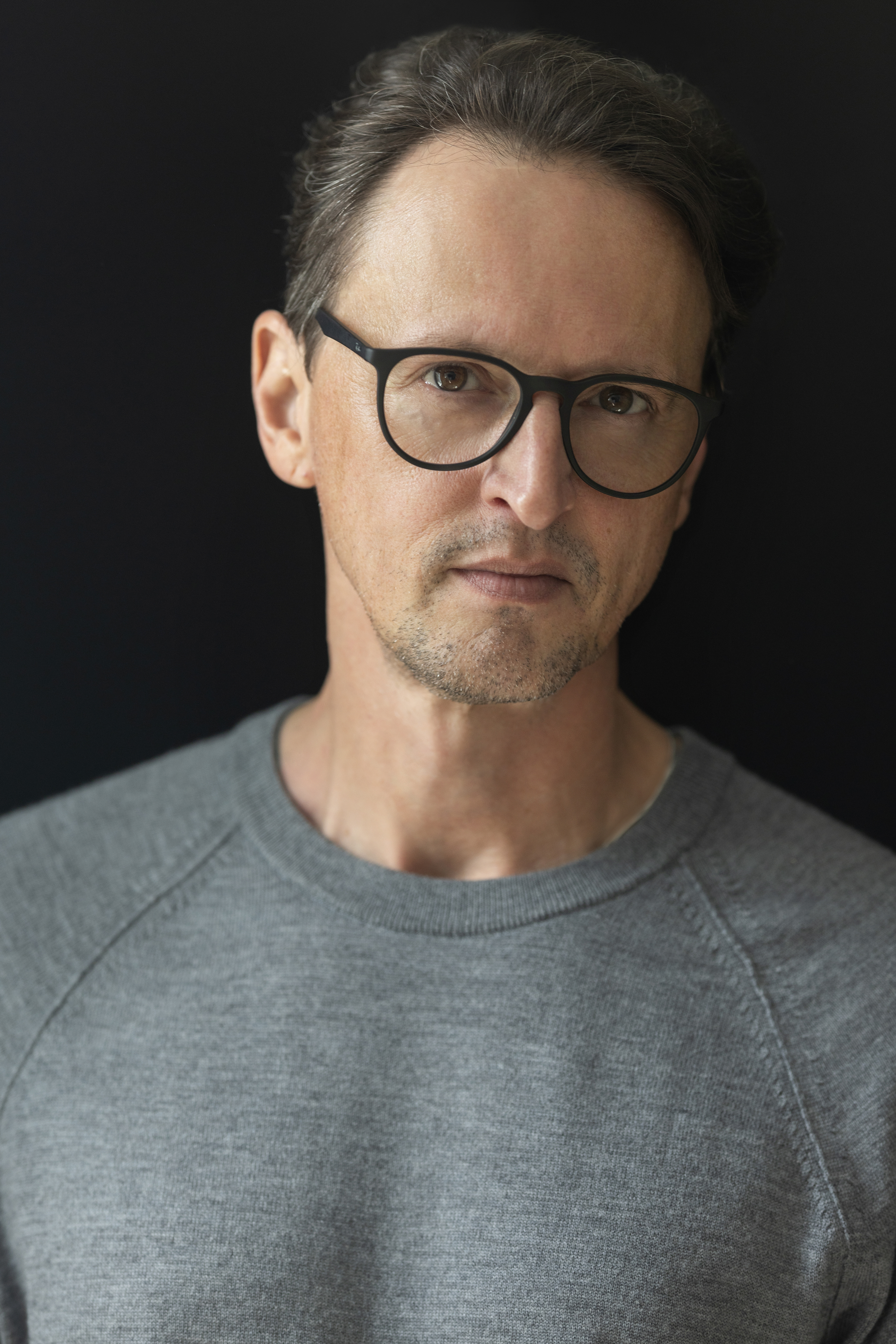
- Born: November 7, 1973 (age 52); Brooklyn, New York, U.S.
- Occupations: Director, producer, actor, music video director

Israel Lugo (born November 7, 1973) is an American actor, director and Latin Grammy Award-winner music video director. Lugo was born in Brooklyn, New York and has credits for directing the documentary Sonó, Sonó, Tité Curet!!! (2011) and for acting on Mi Dia de Suerte, The Apostate, El Clown and Che. Also he is known for his work with Gabriel Coss directing music videos for Calle 13, Nelly Furtado, Maná and Paulina Rubio, among others.

== Acting career ==
Lugo began his career as a child actor on several TV shows such as Chiquimundo, Los 7 del 7, Los García and La Casa de María Chuzema. Lugo also studied psychology at the University of Puerto Rico before returning to his acting career appearing on Mi Dia de Suerte, The Apostate, El Clown and Che. In 2011, Lugo co-directed the documentary Sonó, Sonó, Tité Curet!!!.

== Career as music video director ==
In 2005 Lugo launched 939 films with Gabriel Coss. They directed and produced "Atrévete-te-te" and "La Jirafa", from Calle 13's debut album. Lugo and Coss worked again with Calle 13 on the lead single from their album Residente o Visitante in 2007. "Tango del Pecado", was shot in Puerto Rico and it was described as "the story of a catastrophe, a shameless Latin-American version of a Romeo and Juliet-type of love." The video was nominated for a Latin Grammy Award in 2007 losing to "Ven a Mi Casa Esta Navidad" by Voz Veis.

Lugo and Coss directed Canadian singer-songwriter Nelly Furtado's "All Good Things (Come to an End)", in a video that "finds Furtado frolicking with a male model in Puerto Rico." About the video, Furtado stated: "It's very tropical and romantic. It reminds me of old Sarah McLachlan videos, it has that element of art to it. It's kind of like cinema." Furtado recorded with Calle 13 a remix version of "No Hay Igual" and shot a video in La Perla, San Juan, Puerto Rico also directed by Lugo and Coss.

The music video for "Bendita Tu Luz" by Mexican band Maná featuring Juan Luis Guerra was directed by Lugo and Coss and was shot at Santo Domingo in 2006. Lugo and Coss received a Latin Grammy Award for Best Short Form Music Video in 2009 for "La Perla" by Calle 13 featuring Rubén Blades which was shot at slum of the same name. The music video for "Vamo' a Portarnos Mal", included on Entren Los Que Quieran by Calle 13, was directed by Lugo and Coss in 2010, with locations on Las Monjas, Barrio Obrero and Las Gladiolas at San Juan, Puerto Rico.
