= Casa Rosa =

Historic house in Old San Juan, Puerto Rico

Coordinates: 18°28′05″N 66°06′11″W

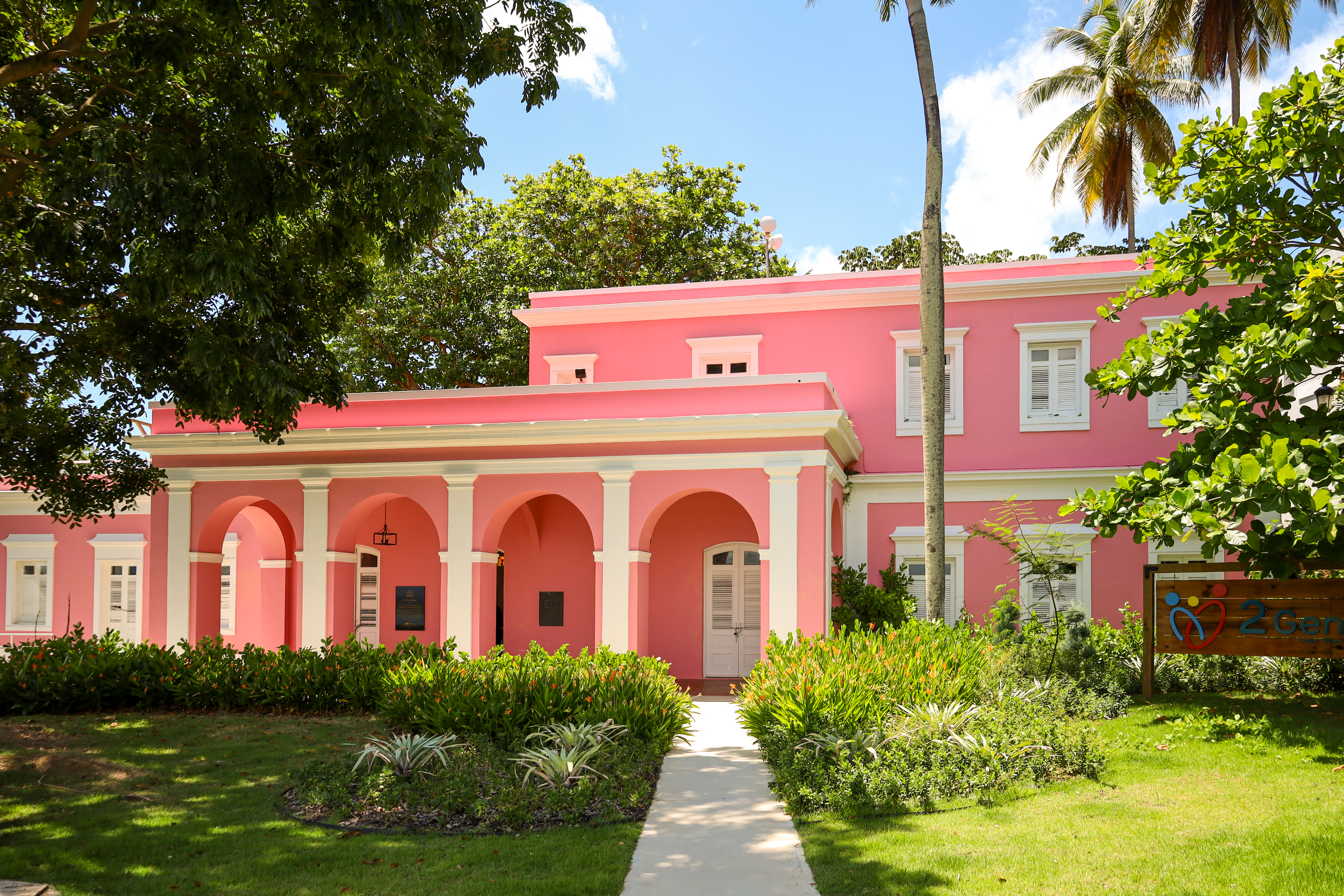
Casa Rosa façade in 2025

Casa Rosa or Casa Rosada, also known as the Pink House, is a former barrack and historic house located in Old San Juan, Puerto Rico. The house was built in 1812 as a barrack for the troops assigned to the San Agustin Bastion. It was converted to officers' quarters in 1881 by the Spanish Army. The building was later converted to a museum used for Puerto Rican crafts. Today it operates as a day care center for the children of employees of the Government of Puerto Rico.
