= La Perla, San Juan, Puerto Rico =

Urban neighborhood in the Old San Juan Historic District in San Juan, Puerto Rico

Coordinates: 18°28′09″N 66°06′58″W

La Perla
- Neighborhood
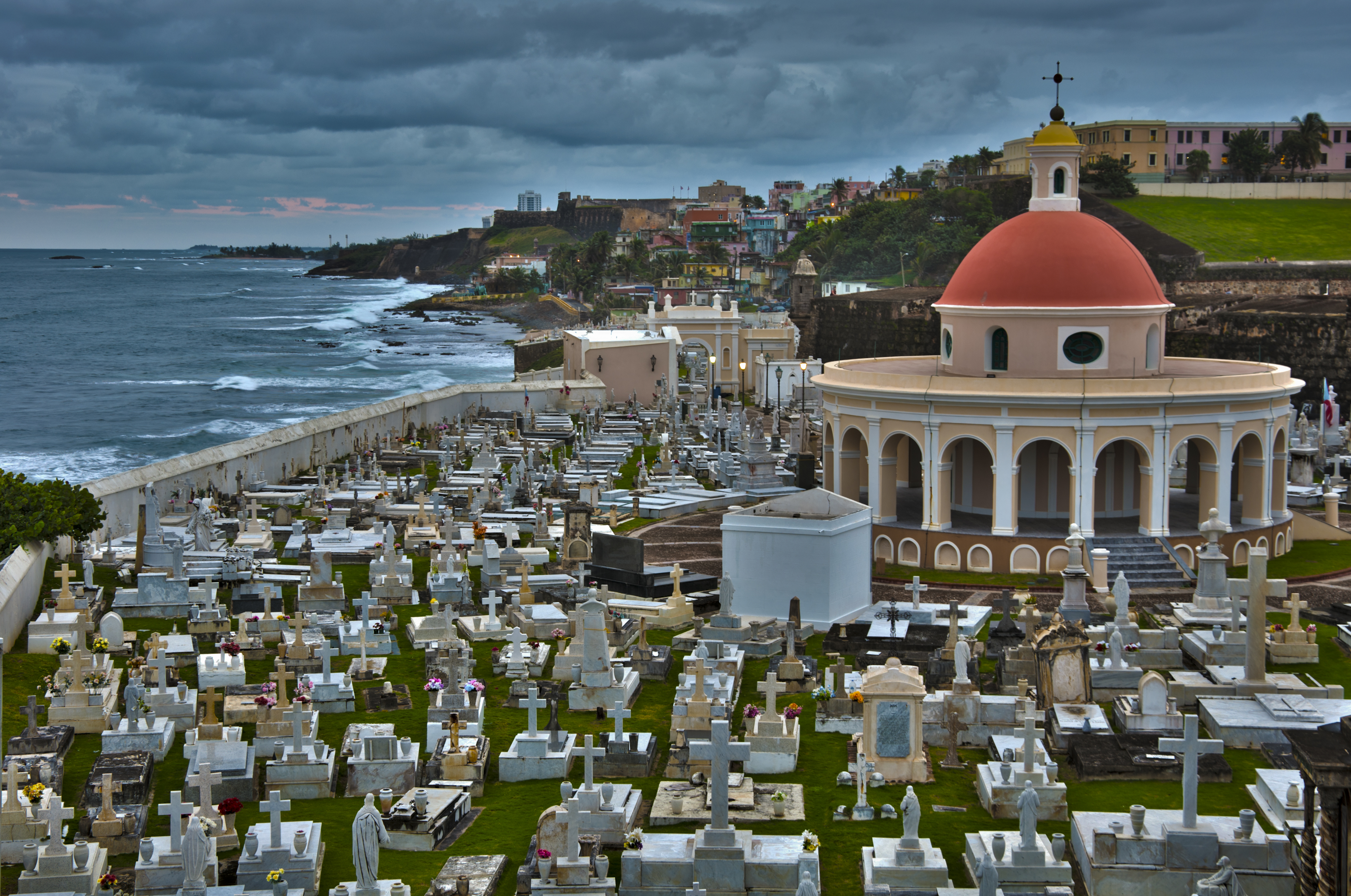
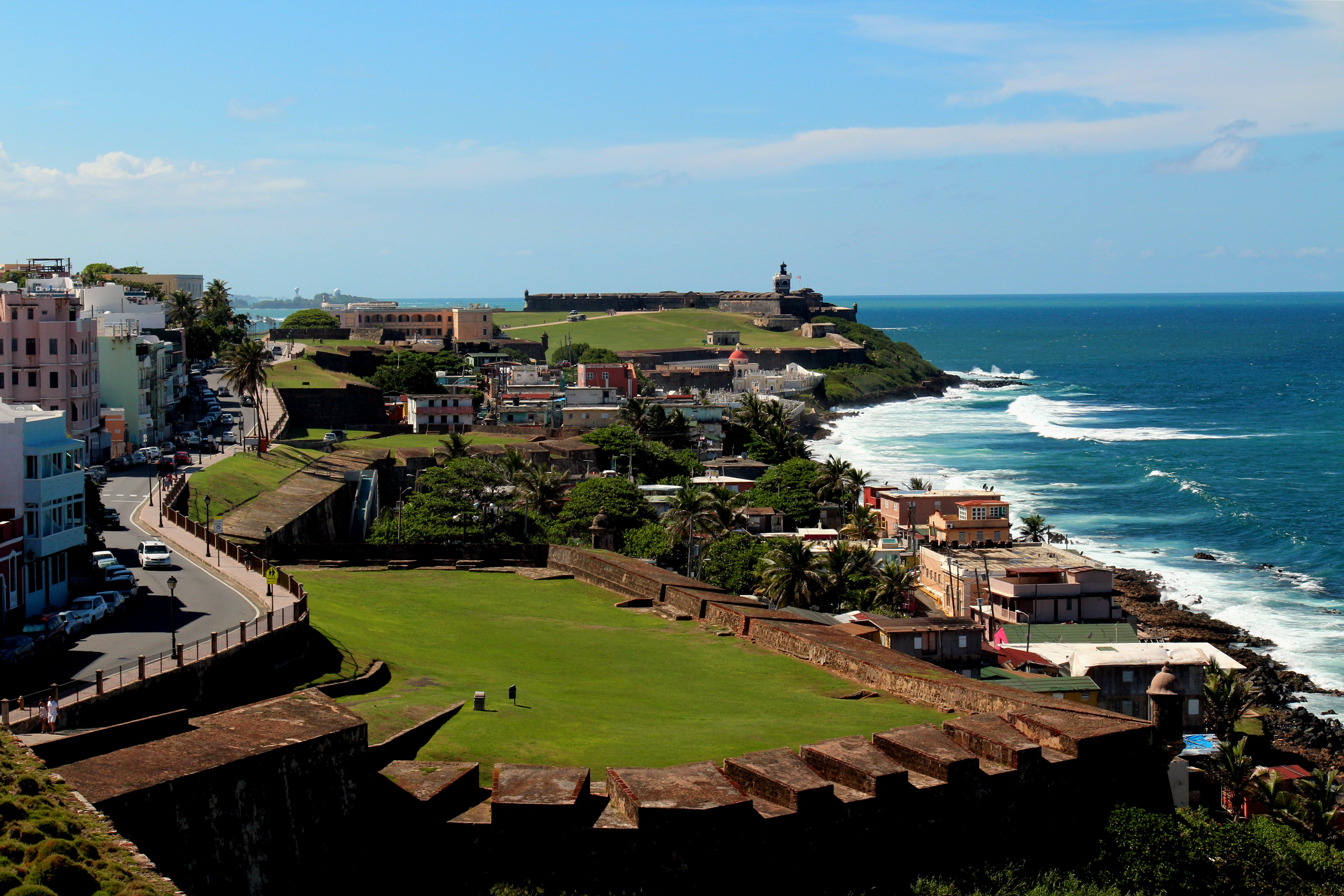
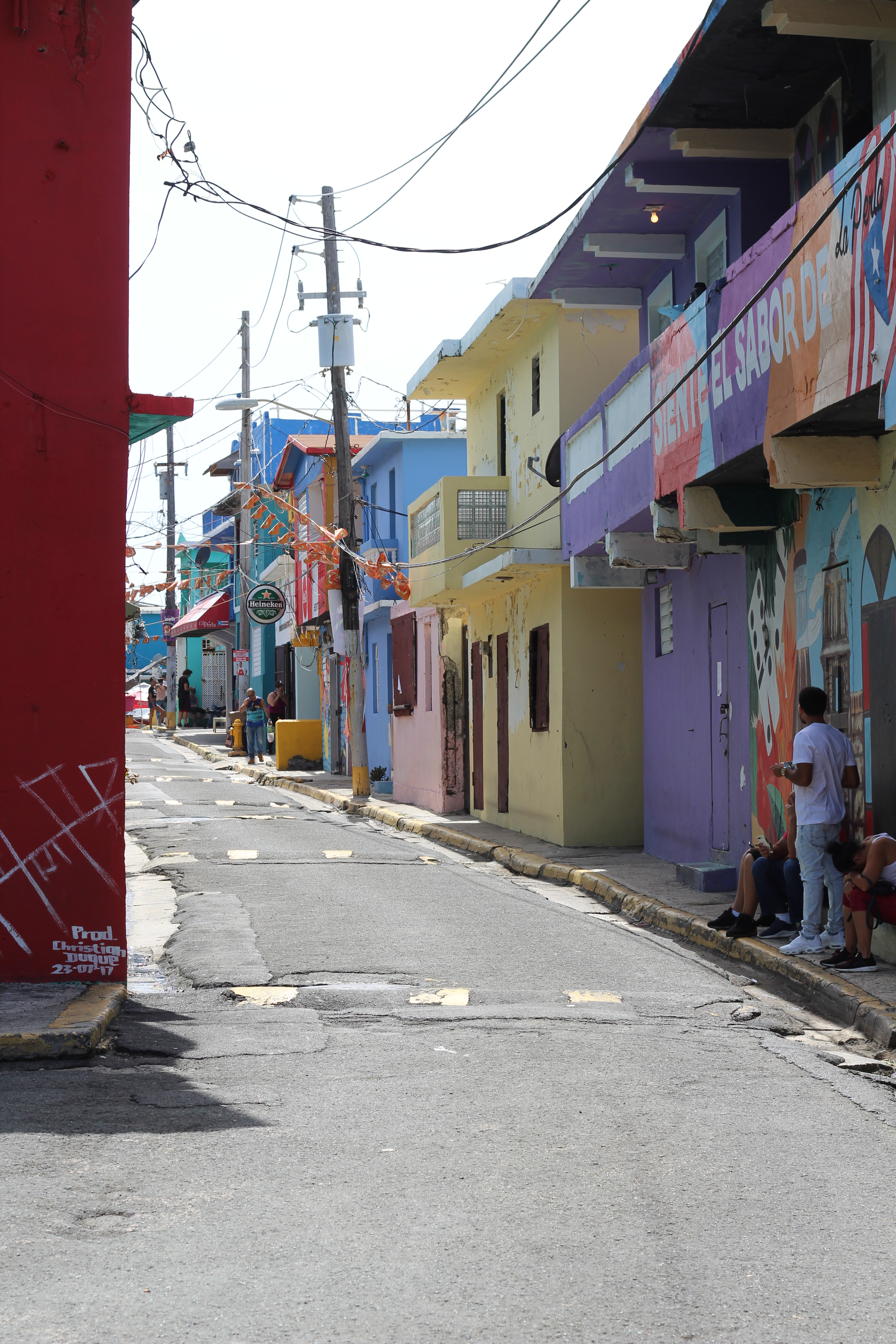
- From top, left to right: La Perla outside and below the Walls of Old San Juan in San Juan Islet from the Atlantic Ocean; La Perla (left background) and El Morro fortress from San Juan Bay entrance; La Perla from Santa María Magdalena de Pazzis Cemetery; La Perla from San Cristóbal fortress; La Perla at night with incoming cruise (background); and Lucila Silva Street in La Perla

- Satellite image of La Perla (top left) within San Juan Islet in northern San Juan, 2016
- Interactive map of La Perla
- Commonwealth: Puerto Rico
- Municipality: San Juan
- Barrio: San Juan Antiguo

Area
  - Total: 0.0328 sq mi (0.085 km^{2})

La Perla (English: "The Pearl") is a small neighborhood in San Juan Islet in northeastern Puerto Rico, located within the districts of San Cristóbal and Mercado of the San Juan Antiguo barrio in San Juan, the capital city and municipality. It is surrounded by the north wall of the Old San Juan historic quarter in the south, the Atlantic Ocean in the north, the Santa Maria Magdalena de Pazzis Cemetery in the west, and the San Cristóbal fortress in the east. Named after a non-extant small fort built in the area in the early 1600s, it was first established around a slaughterhouse as a shantytown for farmers selling crops in the nearby market within the walled colonial city during the 1800s. Despite being an impoverished and high-crime community, it has gained popularity as a cultural and business area, especially since it was featured in the music video of the chart-topping "Despacito" song in 2017.

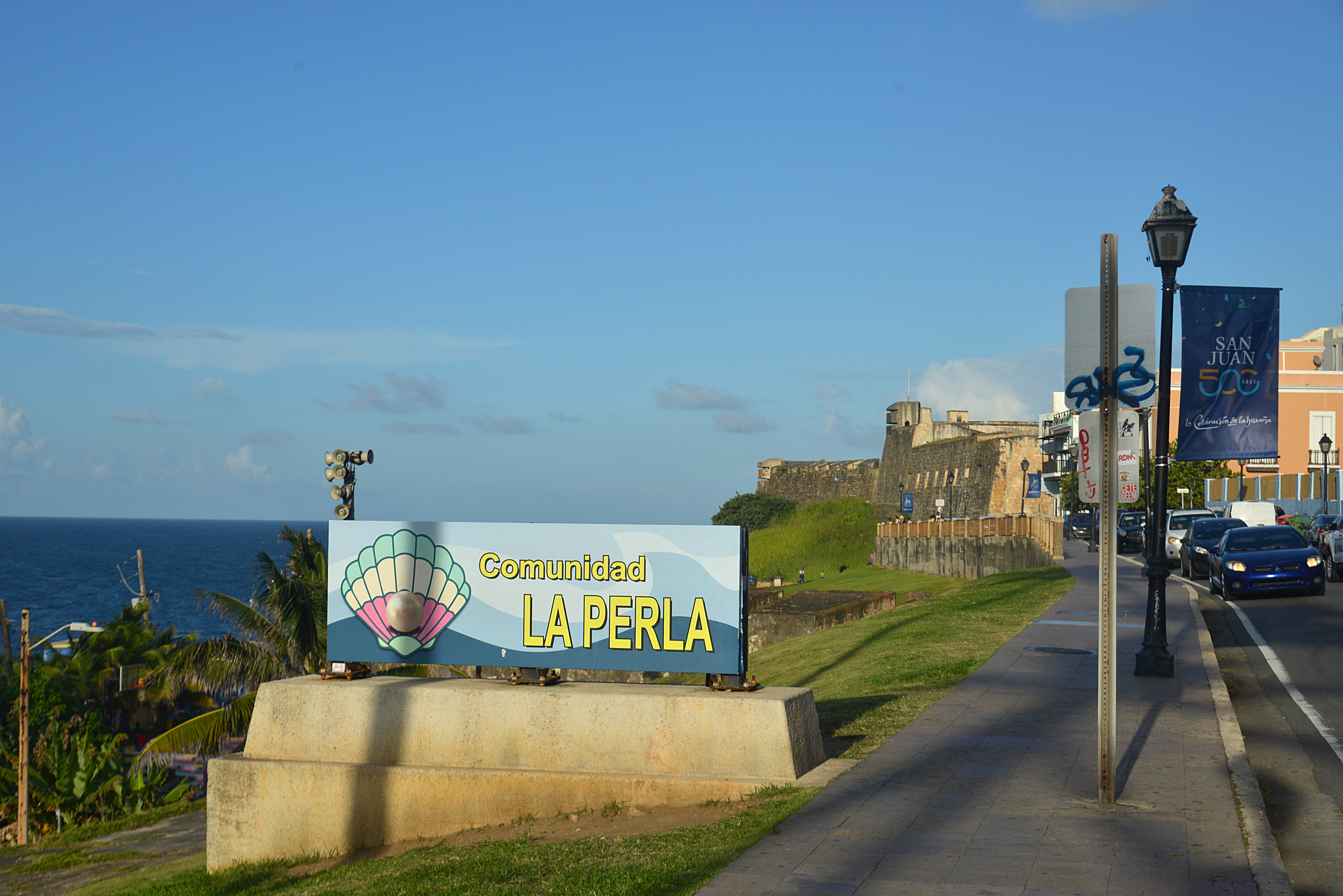
La Perla welcome sign next to Bajada Matadero Street, one of its entry points on Norzagaray Street in the Old San Juan quarter

== History ==
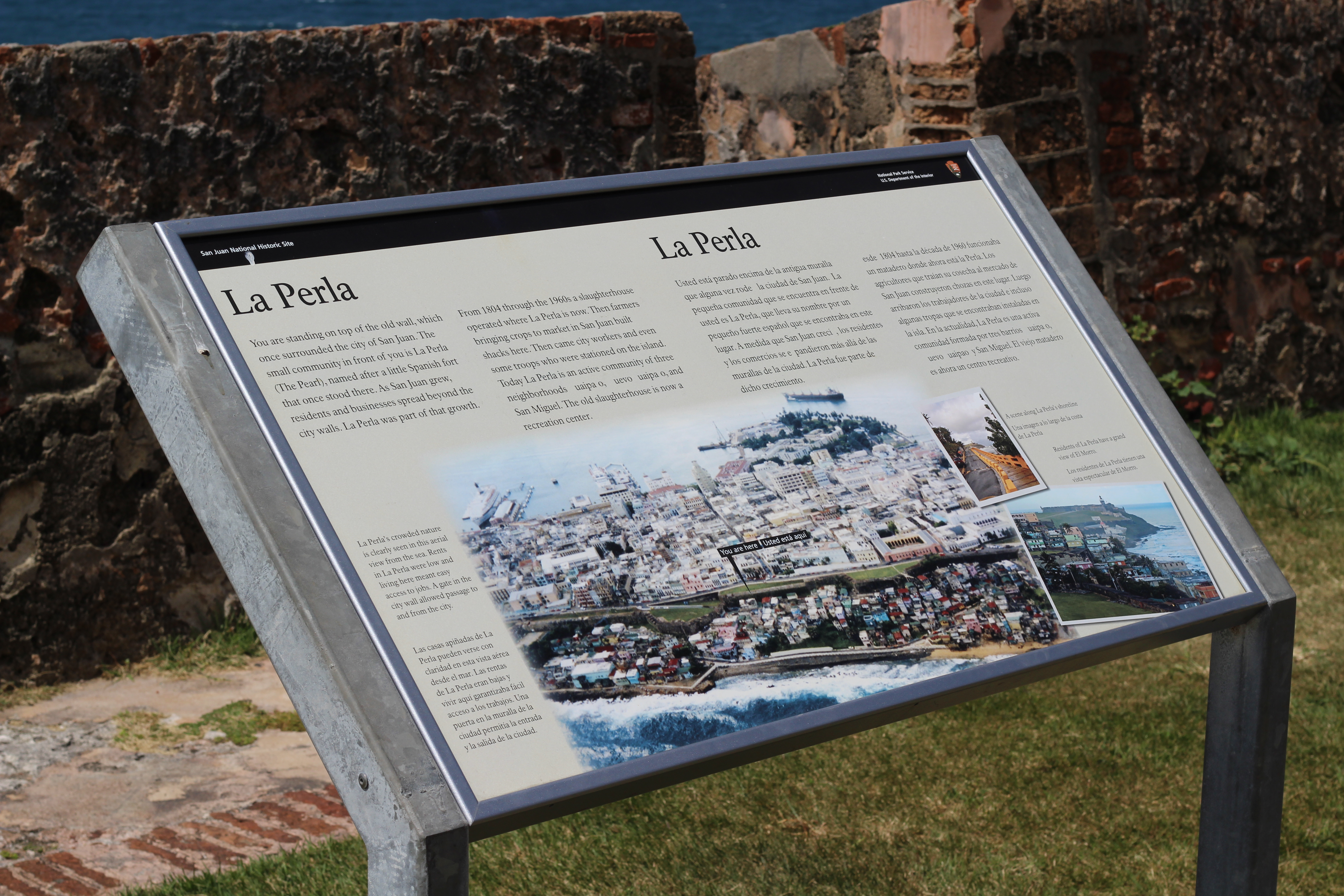
Tourist information sign about La Perla atop the Walls of Old San Juan

The community of La Perla developed on the site of a Spanish coastal artillery fortification known as the Revellín de la Perla, part of San Juan's northern defensive system dating to between 1625 and 1659 in the early 17th century. The fortification lost its strategic relevance after Governor Fernando de Norzagaray, who governed Puerto Rico from 1852 to 1855, had a road built through the area to connect the district to the city center, and the abandoned fort was later demolished to make way for the modern neighborhood.

Located inside the Old San Juan Historic District, La Perla (The Pearl) was originally the site of a slaughterhouse, called El Matadero. It was built in the 18th century outside the walls of San Juan by slaves who were required to live outside the city. Slaves built homes and lived near the slaughterhouse and later jíbaros, (Puerto Rican farmers) who moved to San Juan, lived there.

Beginning in the mid-20th century, the Puerto Rican government pursued a series of urban renewal efforts that involved demolishing homes in La Perla with promises of new housing to replace them, promises that were frequently left unfulfilled. By 1947, roughly one-fifth of the neighborhood's homes had been destroyed, displacing more than half of its population. A further 100 homes were demolished by the government in 1978, deepening residents' distrust of local authorities and reinforcing the community's reliance on mutual support. By 1978, La Perla's population had grown to approximately 1,500 residents, even as the neighborhood remained under constant threat of clearance and forced removal as part of ongoing modernization efforts. Beginning around 1980, in line with planning ideas that had gained traction since the 1960s, government policy shifted away from wholesale clearance toward a series of improvement plans pursued with varying degrees of resident involvement, ranging from top-down expert planning to more participatory approaches that incorporated local input.

== Geography ==
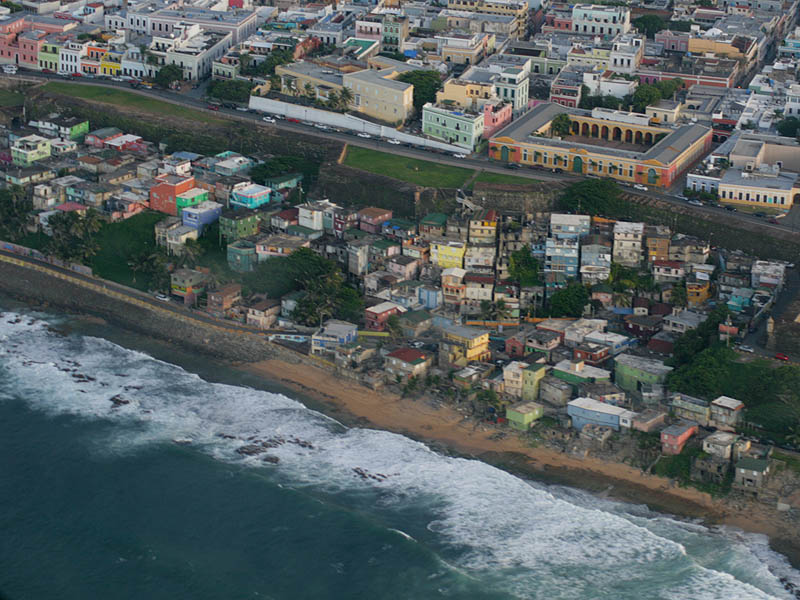
Aerial view of western La Perla outside and below the Walls of Old San Juan

La Perla belongs to and consists of the northernmost stretches of Mercado subbarrio (west) and San Cristóbal subbarrio in San Juan Antiguo barrio. San Juan Antiguo barrio is located on Isleta de San Juan, an island off San Juan, the capital of Puerto Rico, and it is connected to the mainland by bridges and causeways. La Perla is in the Old San Juan Historic District which is managed by US National Park Service.

Only four access points exist into La Perla: one through the Santa María Magdalena de Pazzis Cemetery, and the others from Calle Norzagaray, named after Spanish soldier and colonial governor, Fernándo Norzagaray y Escudero.

1. Calle Tiburcio Reyes (western border, along the outside of the old city wall)
2. Calle San Miguel (mostly in the western part, along the north)
3. Calle Bajada Matadero (mostly in the western part, along the south)
4. Calle Lucila Silva (mostly in the western part, east-west through the middle, too narrow for cars)
5. Calle Augustín O. Aponte (eastern part)

== Description ==
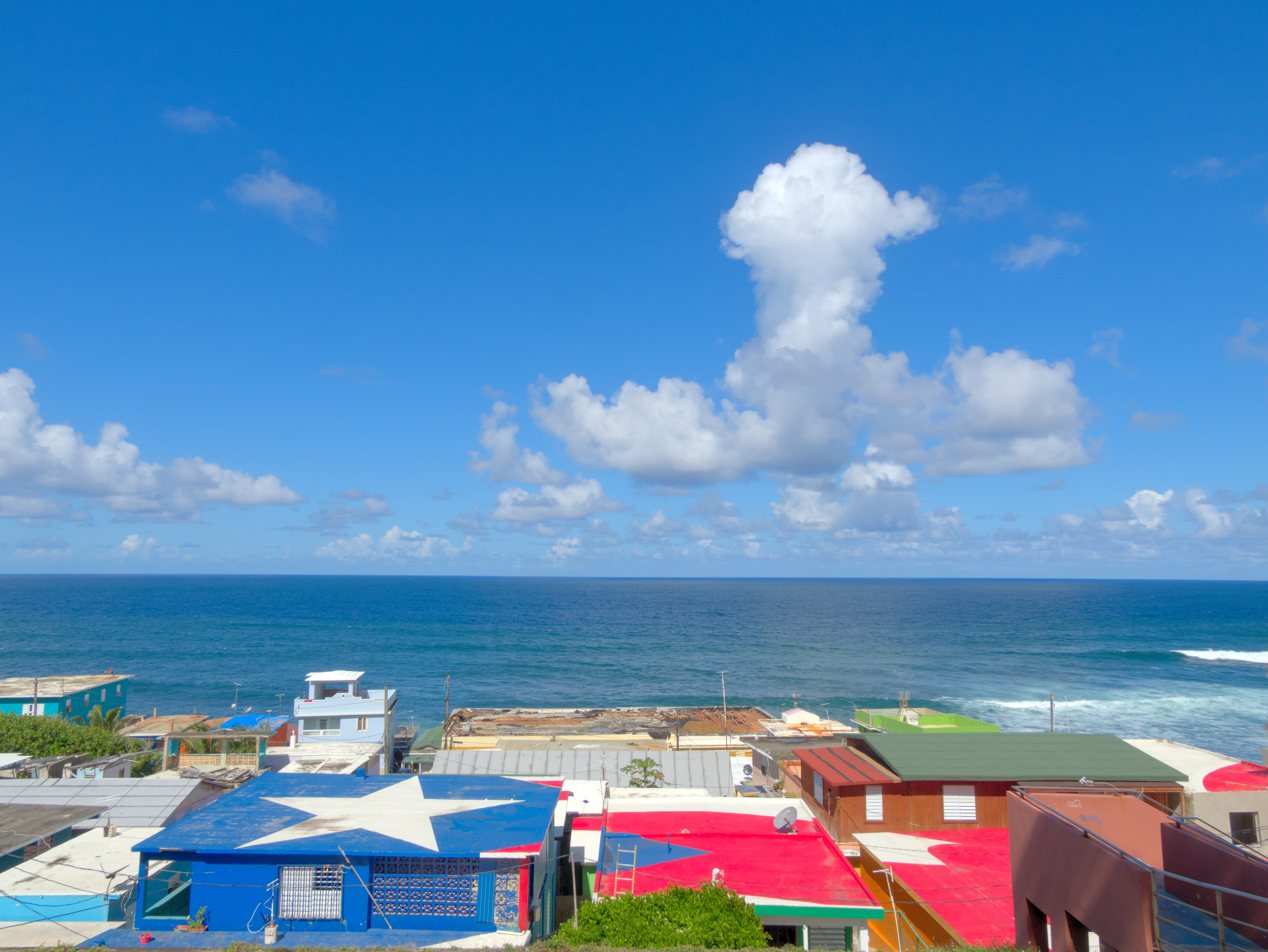

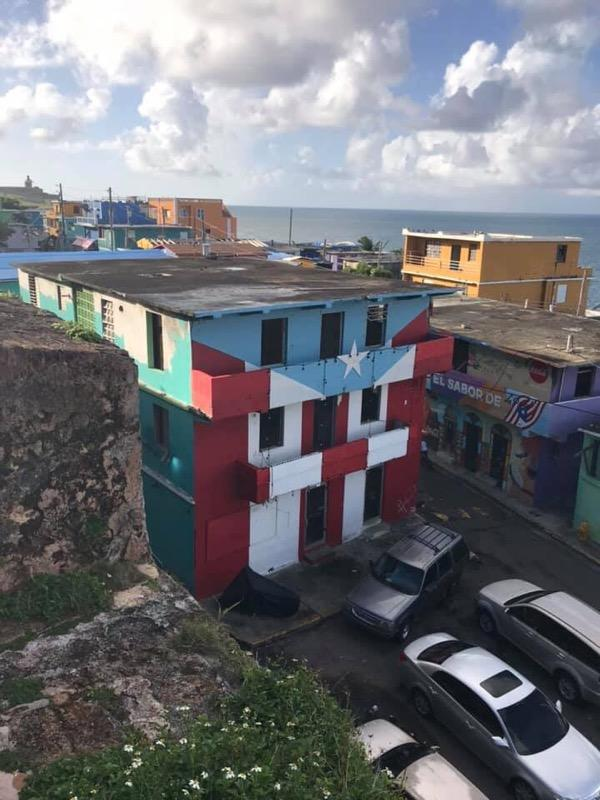
Buildings in La Perla, San Juan, Puerto Rico

La Perla has sometimes been described as a slum and a shantytown, because many homes have been built without proper permits. Scholarly analysis has challenged this characterization, arguing that La Perla developed through an interplay of formal and informal building practices rather than as unplanned settlement, and that it should be regarded as an intrinsic part of San Juan's architectural heritage rather than an environment fundamentally separate from the formal city. Archival property records from the early twentieth century document individual ownership within the neighborhood; one 1913 tax roll, for instance, lists Angela Caldas as the owner of three buildings in La Perla. Despite its reputation as a dangerous haven of drugs and violence, reinforced by a 2011 federal drug-trafficking case against 114 residents, journalists visiting the neighborhood have described a thriving, welcoming local community distinguished by colorful murals, small businesses, and community-oriented social programs.

While tourists have normally been deterred from visiting La Perla, some entrepreneurs have tried to change its image with art galleries, cafés and restaurants. La Perla Impacto Comunitario, a local community group has coordinated tours. The neighborhood's brightly painted homes are not incidental but the result of a deliberate initiative, "La Perla pinta su futuro" ("La Perla Paints Its Future"), launched in 2017, in which around 375 houses were painted and revitalized as part of an effort to beautify the community and encourage tourism. The initiative's second phase focused on developing a resident-run microbusiness offering guided tours of the neighborhood, spearheaded by the Junta Comunitaria de La Perla (La Perla Community Board) alongside other local organizations. Community gardens have also been established in the neighborhood as part of these broader revitalization efforts.

Despite the fact that many homes in La Perla have been built without proper permits, residents of La Perla do have utility services. Garbage pickup is done regularly in the neighborhood, which in 1973 consisted of about 900 houses and 3,300 residents.

La Perla has a community-oriented music recording studio, El Estudio D' Oro, which serves as a free of cost music production workshop for all ages. El Estudio D' Oro is also home to the FM urban radio show, Hip Hop 787 La Verdadera Escuela, which is broadcast live from the studio on WVOZ Mix 107.7 FM. Reggaeton artist De la Ghetto grew up in La Perla and has credited the neighborhood with shaping his early career, recalling that he was discovered there by fellow musician Zion before rising to prominence in Puerto Rico's reggaeton scene.

Since 2020, community leaders in La Perla have organized a weekly gathering known as the Community Batey of La Plaza del Negro, where residents and visitors sing, drum, and dance bomba, an Afro-Puerto Rican musical tradition rooted in resistance and cultural identity among enslaved and Maroon communities. The gathering is free and open to all ages, genders, and backgrounds. The group originally met at La Plaza del Negro, but relocated to La Perla's malecón (boardwalk) in May 2021 after U.S. authorities prohibited further gatherings at the original site amid ongoing disputes over land near the city walls.

In 2010, Carmelo Anthony remodeled the basketball court located to the eastern side of La Perla, with a new surface and design featuring the logo of Air Jordan’s Melo footwear line. It eventually became known by the name of the Nuyorican athlete, who also repaired several other venues throughout the island. The refurbished playing field was later included among "the most breathtaking locations for a basketball court in the world" due to its oceanside location overlooking the Atlantic.

In June 2011, the US Drug Enforcement Agency with other agencies targeted 50 properties in La Perla and indicted 114 people from La Perla for drug trafficking.

In 2016, students of architecture at universities in Puerto Rico asked children for their ideas on how to improve their favorite areas of La Perla. El Bowl is a colorful, bowl-shaped cemented area in La Perla, used for skateboarding on weekdays, and then filled with water on weekends, to serve as a pool. It was created in 2006 by artist Chemi Rosado-Seijo in collaboration with skateboarder Roberto "Boly" Cortez, La Perla resident Luiggi Ramos, and neighbors from the community, built on reclaimed land using recycled materials. The structure has since drawn international attention through appearances in films, music videos, and other media, and its visibility has led neighboring residents to open bars and restaurants catering to visiting skateboarders and tourists.

On September 20, 2017, Hurricane Maria hit Puerto Rico and La Perla "looked like it was hit by a bomb". "Despacito" ... was also used to highlight and criticize the slow United States response to the destruction at La Perla caused by Hurricanes Irma and Maria, where the video was filmed. The National Park Service assisted the residents of La Perla with tarps soon afterwards. The storm had abruptly halted the wave of tourism the video had generated, and residents who had begun to see new economic opportunity — including local guides and small business owners — found that recovery, rather than tourism, was again the community's priority.

Following the destruction caused by Hurricanes Irma and Maria, artists have painted dozens of murals throughout La Perla as part of a broader community effort to revitalize the neighborhood through art. Art student Dalila Pinci, whose murals include a portrait of a woman surrounded by tropical flowers and foliage, has said there is "a lot of community effort to bring [La Perla] back to life and nourish it with art."

Ahead of musician Bad Bunny's 2025 concert residency in San Juan, the community launched "La Perla Pinta Su Futuro II," a continuation of the 2017 painting initiative, in which 52 additional homes were repainted with murals created by artists Karina Taveras, Enrique "Rafique" Vega, and Héctor "Ekosaurio" López. The project, supported by Bad Bunny's foundation, produced murals intended to reflect community struggle and identity rather than purely decorative art. An accompanying photo exhibition on the history of La Perla was also planned to open at the neighborhood's restored Antiguo Matadero community center.

The Antiguo Matadero building, the historic slaughterhouse structure around which La Perla originally developed, fell into disrepair after being damaged by Hurricane Maria in 2017. In February 2026, San Juan Mayor Miguel Romero Lugo and the Municipality of San Juan inaugurated its restoration as the new Centro Comunitario de La Perla, a $2,033,635.95 renovation funded jointly by municipal funds and Puerto Rico's State Historic Preservation Office, intended to host recreational, educational, and cultural activities for the community.

== Census ==
In terms of the United States 2000 Census, La Perla is composed of Census blocks 3001 through 3010 (Block group 3, Census tract 4, San Juan, Puerto Rico). A population of 338 was reported, 198 housing units (29 unoccupied), and 169 households, on an area of 80,028 square yards (16.53 acres; 66,914 m²).

La Perla belongs to and consists of the northernmost stretches of the subbarrios Mercado (west) and San Cristóbal in San Juan Antiguo barrio. The dividing line between the subbarrios is the imagined extension of Calle San Justo to the north beyond the old city wall to the Atlantic coast. The eastern part consists of Census blocks 3002, 3009 und 3010, with a population of 64, 35 housing units (4 unoccupied), and 31 households, on 41,348 square yards (8.5 acres; 34,572 m²).

== Popular culture ==
La Perla was the true site of the fictional "La Esmeralda" barrio depicted in Oscar Lewis's sociological work "La vida: a Puerto Rican family in the culture of poverty--San Juan and New York", describing the lives of Puerto Rican slumdwellers and prostitutes. From La Perla, through taped interviews with dozens of intertwined family members who lived there in the 1940s-1960s, Lewis wrote an award-winning and controversial book. It was controversial because his award-winning book, written in 1967, would influence the way people viewed Puerto Rican women and Puerto Ricans, in general. "Many who read his book assumed the whores of La Perla were typical of all Puerto Rican women."

In 1978, salsa singer Ismael Rivera had a hit song, written by composer Catalino Curet Alonso, in honor of this community, and named after it. In 2009 Urban Music group Calle 13 released another tribute song, also named La Perla, in collaboration with Ruben Blades. In the song, Blades references Rivera's early effort; in the song's video, Blades pays his respects to Curet by visiting his tomb at the community's Santa María Madgalena de Pazzis cemetery.

Canadian singer Nelly Furtado along with Calle 13 band member Residente filmed the music video to the remix of Furtado's song No Hay Igual on 26 June 2006 in La Perla. Residente said he hoped that the video would help them both reach new audiences: "It's a good opportunity for us both. More than the North American market, the European market really interests me and her because her family is Portuguese." The video was directed by Israel Lugo and Gabriel Coss, photographed by Sonnel Velazquez and produced by María Estades.

In Giannina Braschi's political allegory United States of Banana (2011), the Puerto Rican prisoner Segismundo is born in the dungeon of the Statue of Liberty as the illegitimate child of a woman from La Perla and the Governor of Puerto Rico Luis Muñoz Marín.

The Puerto Rican classic play, La Carreta, (1953) by René Marqués, takes place in La Perla. A poor family moves from their farm to La Perla, and then to the Bronx for the better life that they never quite find.

The motion picture The Vessel, starring Martin Sheen, about a tidal wave that destroys a small town, was filmed in La Perla in 2013.

The area has a reputation for being dangerous, but the popular 2017 Despacito music video filmed there made it a curiosity amongst tourists, with some wanting to venture in to see where the video was filmed. With more than 9.1 billion views on YouTube, La Perla became world-known with the music video for the song Despacito having been filmed there. The song's singer, Luis Fonsi, received $700,000 as part of a deal in which the Puerto Rico Tourism Company acquired rights to use "Despacito" and made him the face of its tourism campaign.

== Gallery ==
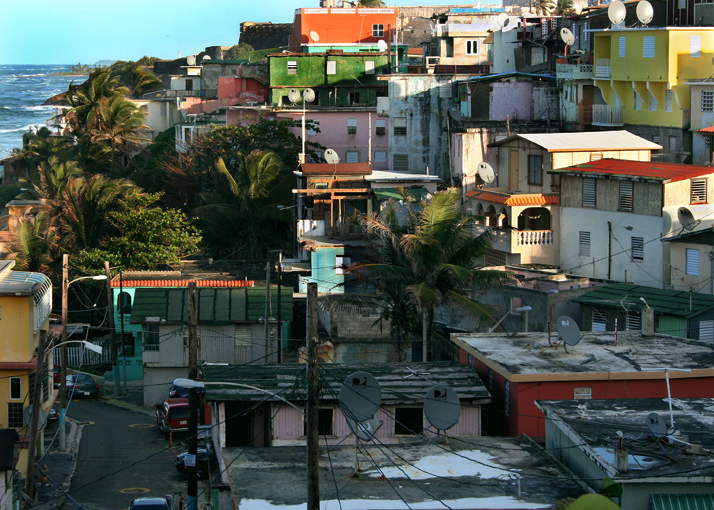
Central La Perla

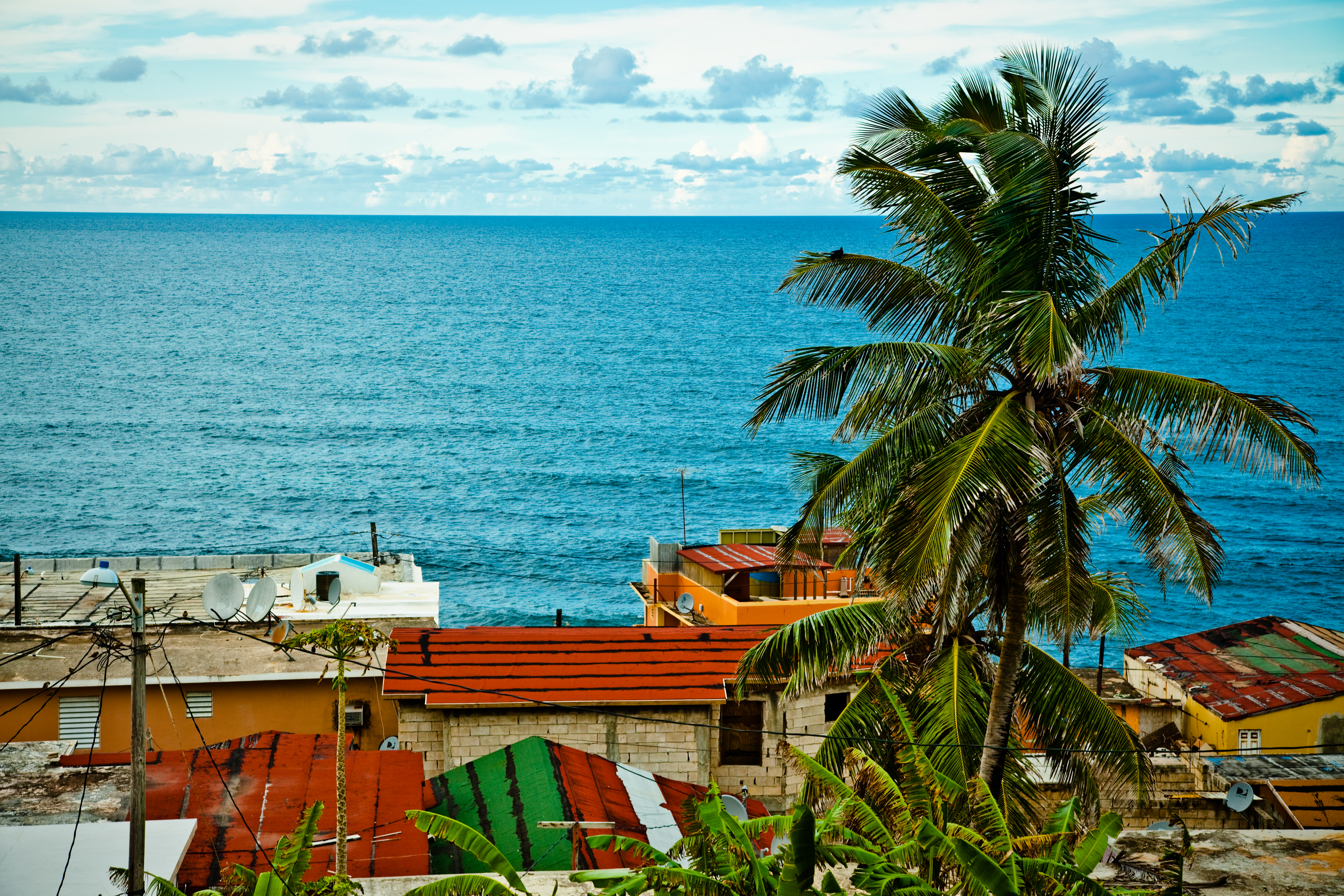
La Perla from Norzagaray Street atop the Walls of Old San Juan

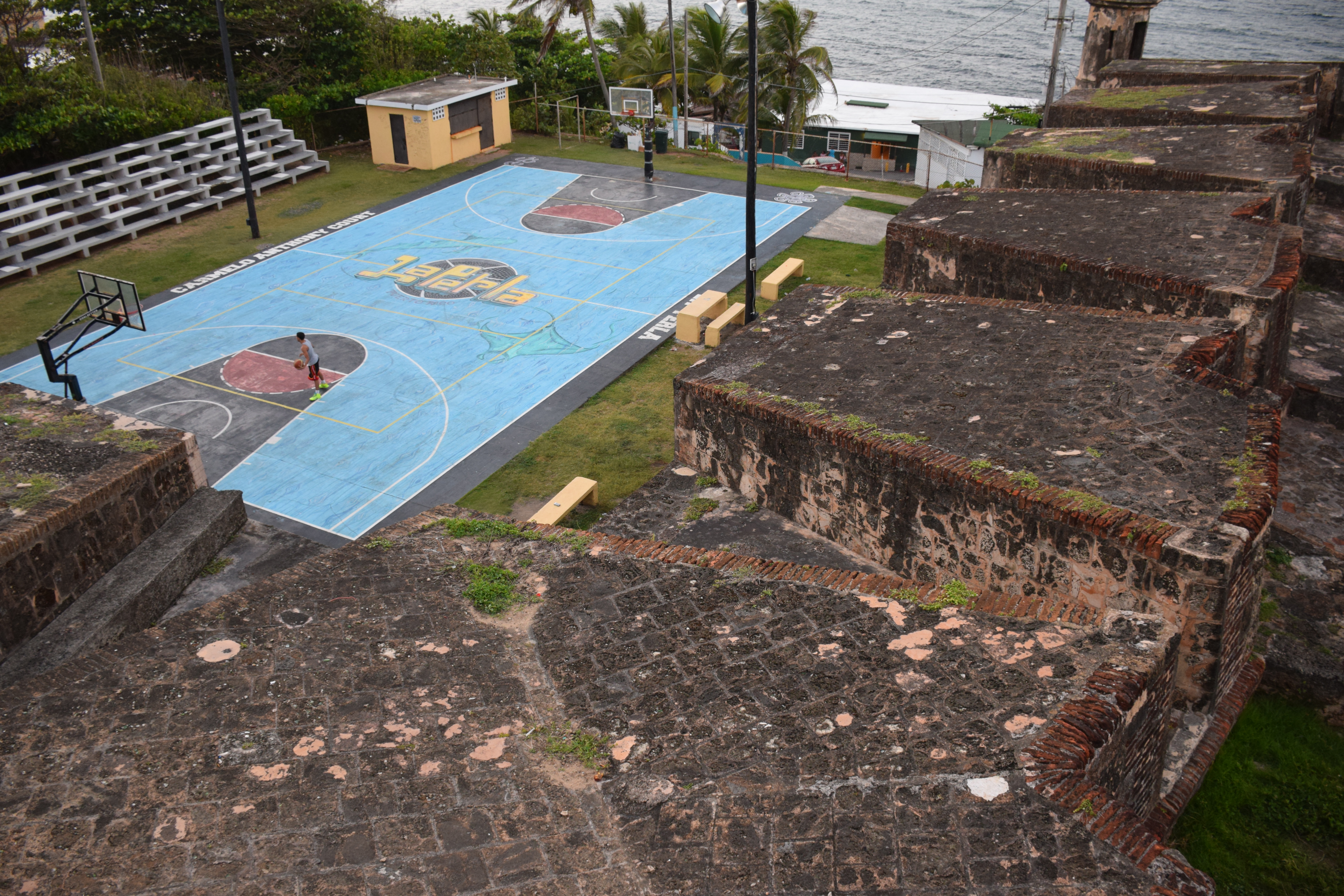
Basketball court in eastern end of La Perla from San Sebastián Bastion

== See also ==
- List of communities in Puerto Rico

== Bibliography ==
- Florian Urban (2015). "La Perla: 100 years of informal architecture in San Juan, Puerto Rico". Planning Perspectives. 30 (4): 495–536. doi:10.1080/02665433.2014.1003247. S2CID 143938332.
