= Walls of Old San Juan =

Fortification in Puerto Rico

- Murallas del Viejo San Juan
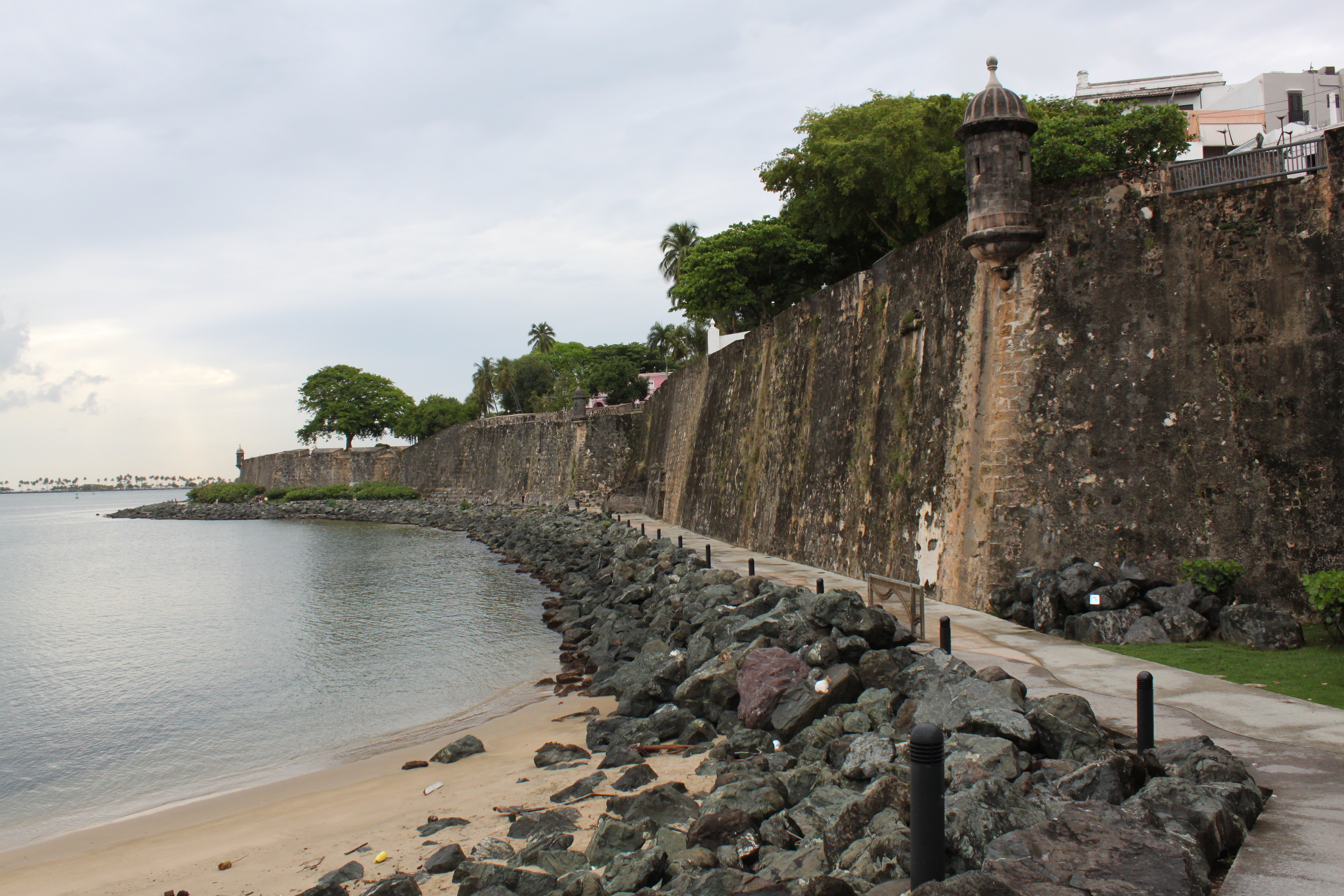
- Western wall from Paseo de la Princesa towards Castillo San Felipe del Morro

- Location within Puerto Rico
- Location: Old San Juan, San Juan, Puerto Rico
- Coordinates: 18°28′3″N 66°6′37″W
- Governing body: National Park Service

UNESCO World Heritage Site
- Criteria: Cultural: (vi)
- Designated: 1983 (7th session)
- Part of: La Fortaleza and San Juan National Historic Site in Puerto Rico
- Reference no.: 266bis-001
- Extensions: 2016

U.S. National Register of Historic Places
- Designated: October 15, 1966
- Reference no.: 66000930

The Walls of Old San Juan (Spanish: Murallas del Viejo San Juan) is a defensive city wall that surrounds the western end of the San Juan Islet, site of the historic district of San Juan, Puerto Rico. This defensive wall system was built between the 16th and 18th centuries to protect the city and the Bay of San Juan, a highly strategic point in the Caribbean. These walls, along with the defensive fortresses in Old San Juan (La Fortaleza, El Morro and San Cristóbal), form part of the UNESCO World Heritage Site-designated San Juan National Historic Site as they are characteristic examples of the historic methods of construction used in military architecture which adapted European designs and techniques to the special conditions of the Caribbean port cities.

San Juan remains the only walled city under the United States jurisdiction, with walled cities like Boston, Charleston and New Orleans no longer having walls after the 18th century, although St. Augustine, Florida, still retains several wall remnants. Examples of other North American walled cities that retain their ramparts are Quebec City in Canada and Campeche in Mexico. The bartizans (garitas) found along the walls are considered emblematic of the city of San Juan and a symbol of historic heritage preservation in Puerto Rico.

== Overview ==
Construction of the defensive walls began in 1634 with the establishment of 3 miles of masonry walls, and by 1783 the wall system fully encircled the city of Old San Juan. The current wall system continued to be updated and modified between the 17th and the 20th centuries, although most of the current structure dates to the 18th century. About three fourths of the walls remain as the southeastern portion was demolished after being heavily damaged by the 1867 earthquake and in order to allow for the eastward urban development of Old San Juan during the time that the Islet of San Juan was being connected to the emerging San Juan streetcar system and the expanding railroad system of Puerto Rico. The remaining portions of the wall system are now historically protected, and it additionally consist of series of ramparts and bastions interconnected with El Morro and San Cristóbal defensive castles.

== Layout and components ==
=== Southeastern wall and Puerta de Tierra ===
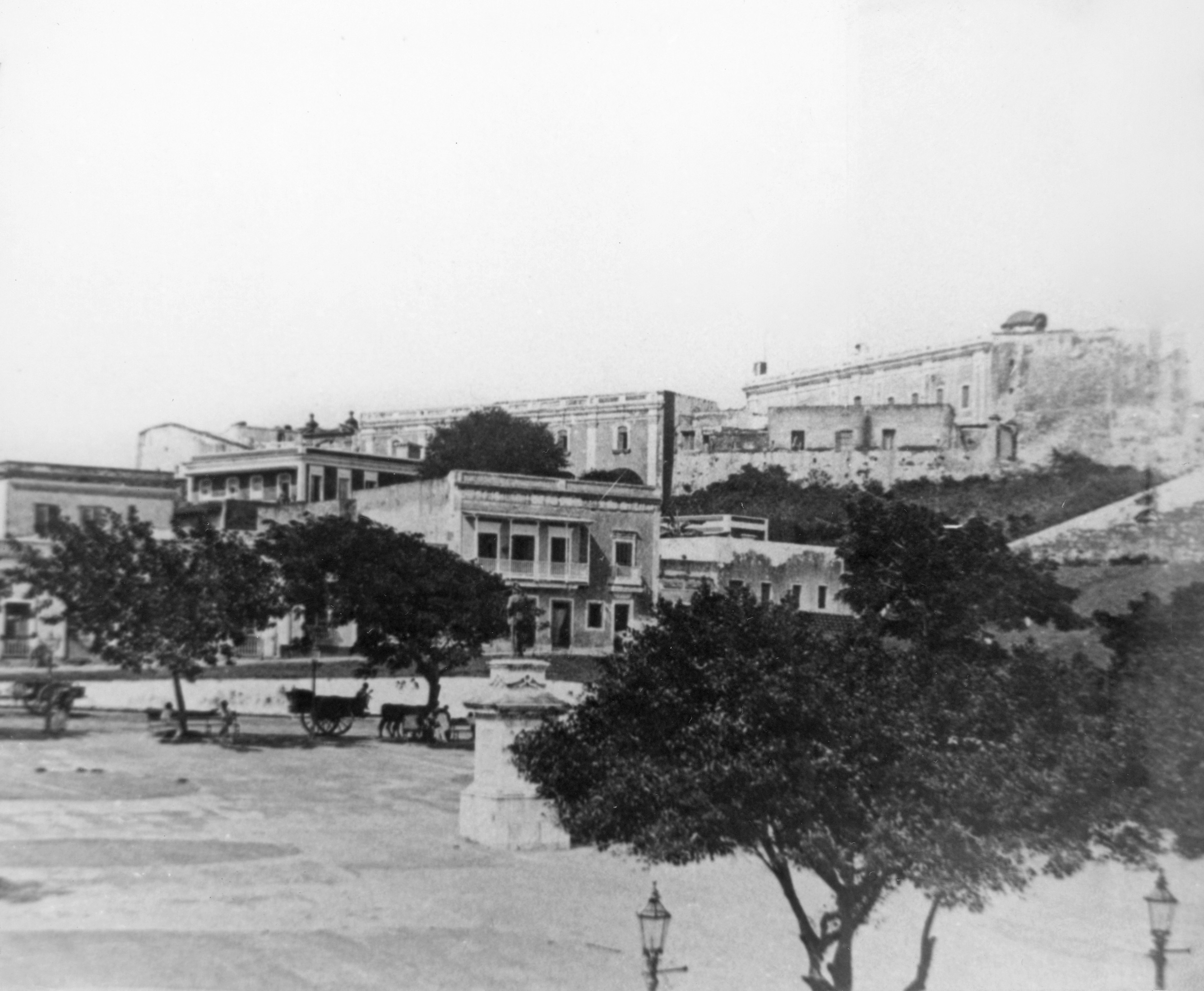
Plaza de Santiago (today Plaza Colón), site of the former Gate of Santiago (Puerta de Tierra).

The southeastern portion of the city wall system is the only section that does not remain as it was demolished by the end of the 19th century after suffering irreparable damages from the 1867 Virgin Islands earthquake. Additionally, much effort in the development of the defensive system of the Islet of San Juan had been focused on the construction of the Fortín de San Gerónimo de Boquerón and the development of the eastern Advanced Defense Line earlier in the 18th century. During this time, the damaged southeastern portion of the wall was considered militarily redundant and physically obstructive for the eastward urban expansion of Old San Juan.

The former southern wall extended from the still standing Bastión de la Derecha de San Justo y Pastor, located at the eastern end of Paseo de La Princesa, eastward along Recinto Sur and Covadonga Streets. At the time of the demolition of the wall, Covadonga Avenue (better known as Paseo Covadonga) formed part of the northern terminus of the Camino Real (today the Ponce de León Avenue) and it was the location of the Covadonga Railway and Streetcar Terminal which no longer stands. North from this site was the location of the main eastern access gate into the city, where Plaza Colón (formerly known as Santiago Square) is today. The eastern district of the Islet of San Juan still retains the name of this gate, colloquially known as Puerta de Tierra (Land Gate, officially Gate of Santiago), as it provided ground access into the city from the mainland of Puerto Rico. From here the wall connected to the Castillo San Cristóbal, the largest colonial fortification built by Europeans in the New World.

=== Northern wall ===
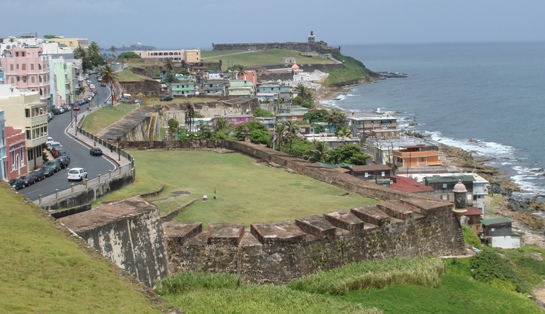
San Sebastián Bastion and La Perla.

From the Castillo San Cristóbal, the city wall includes the Bastión de Santa Teresa and a bartizan or sentry box popularly known as Garita del Diablo, and it extends eastward along Norzagaray Street providing the city defense from attacks coming from the Atlantic Ocean. Several unplanned communities organically developed around slaughterhouse sites along the north flank of this wall between the 17th and 18th centuries, of which La Perla remains today. This wall section contains the bastions of San Sebastián, Santo Tomás, Las Ánimas and San Antonio, and the eastward walls of El Morro.

=== Western wall and Puerta de Agua ===
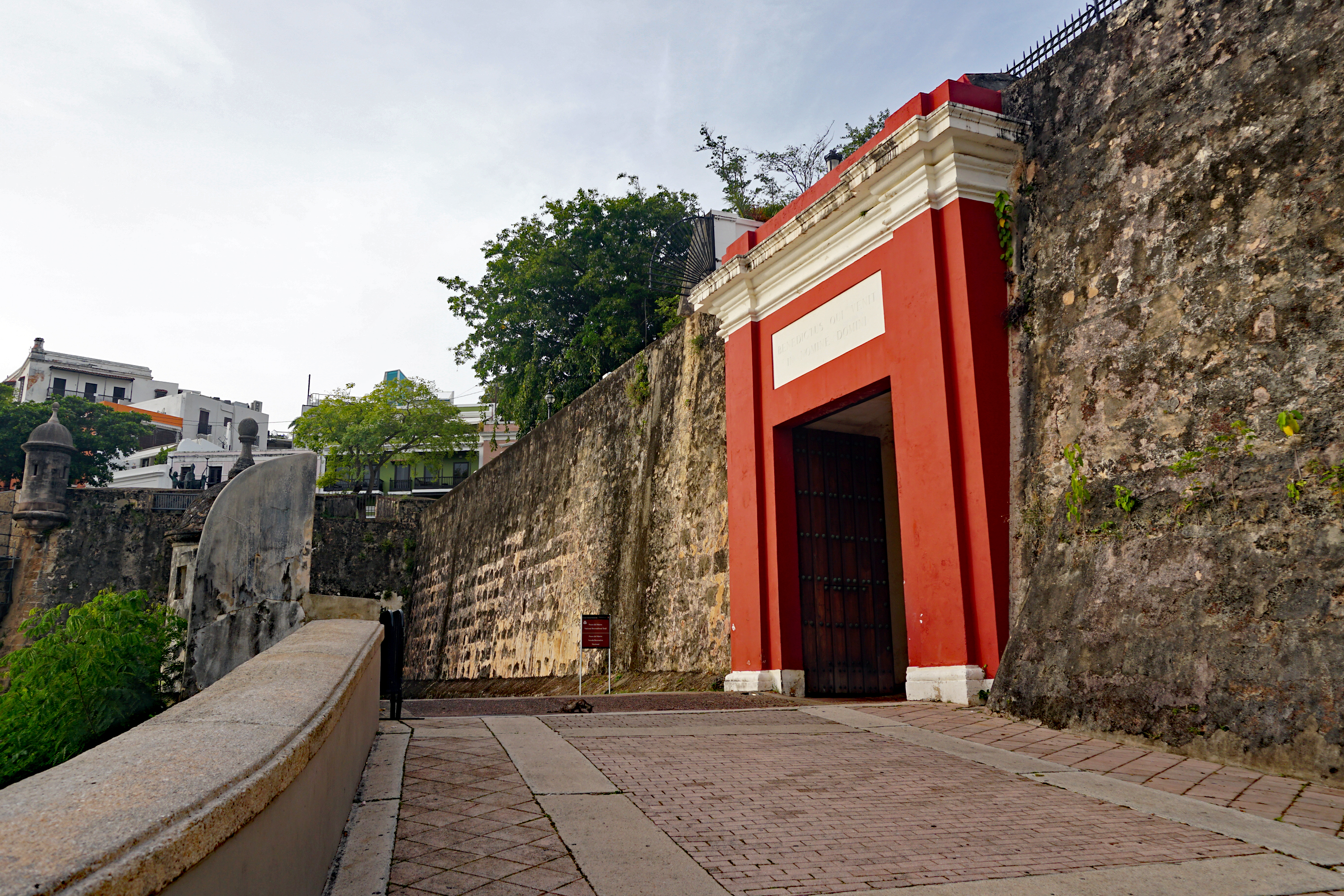
Gate of San Juan (Puerta de Agua)

Castillo San Felipe del Morro represents the main defensive structure along the northwestern portion of the wall system, in addition to the main defensive entry point into the San Juan Bay together with the smaller Fortín San Juan de la Cruz, popularly known as El Cañuelo, located across the entrance of the bay in Isla de Cabras.

The western first line of defense consists of the San Fernando Battery, the Santa Elena Battery and the Bastión de Santa Elena. This place is also the site of a powder warehouse and several defensive infrastructure and buildings such as what is today known as the Casa Rosa (Pink House). From here the wall extends southward by La Fortaleza, a former military palace that today serves as the main residence of the Governor of Puerto Rico. The other main access gate to the city is still located here and it is known as the Gate of San Juan (Puerta de San Juan), although it used to be colloquially known as Puerta de Agua (Water Gate, in contrast to Puerta de Tierra in the east) since it provided access into the old port of San Juan.

This portion of the walls can be accessed today through the El Morro Esplanade and the Paseo del Morro, a mile-long path that connects the Paseo de La Princesa to the lower walls of El Morro at the entrance of the Bay of San Juan.

=== Southern wall ===
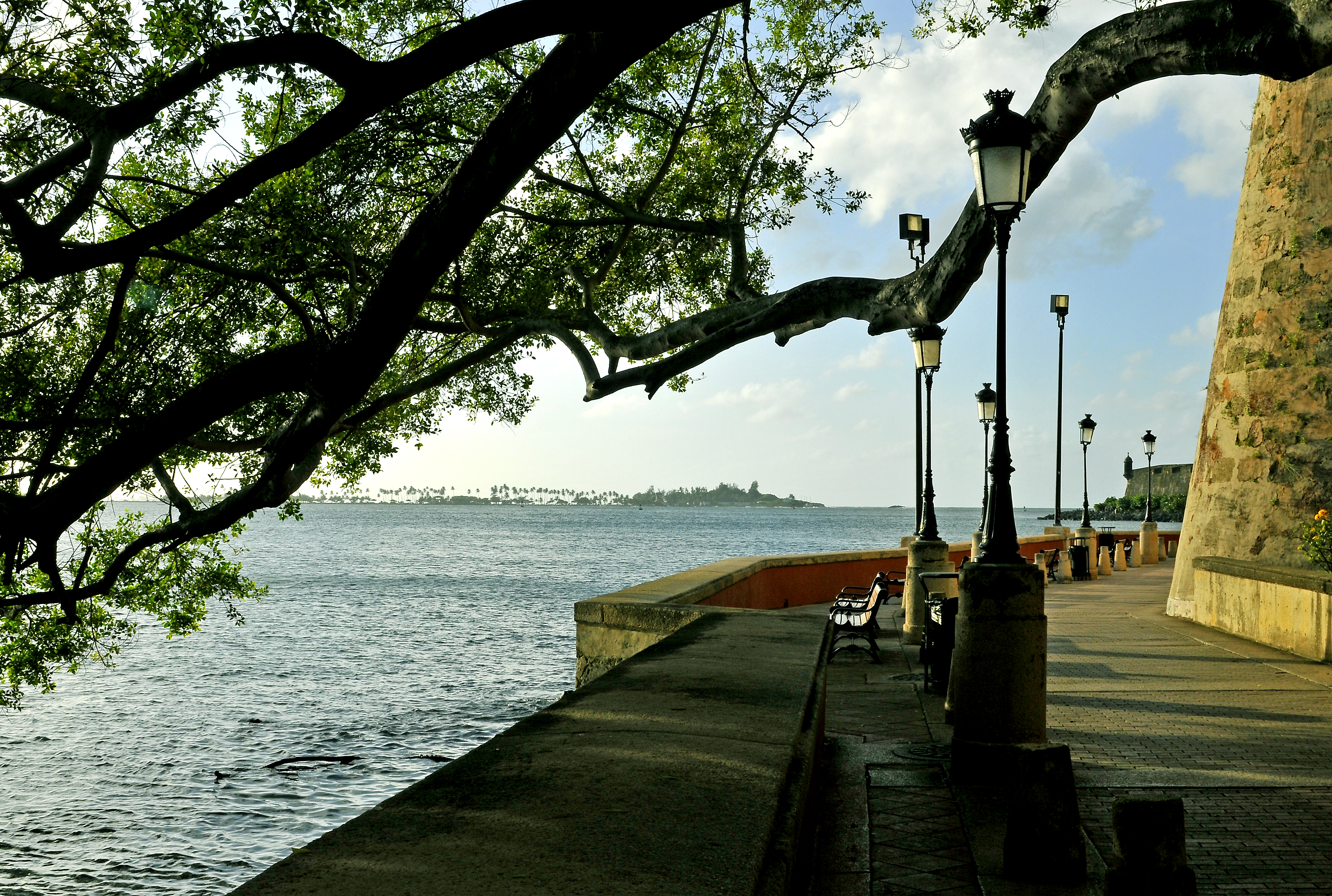
Southwestern wall along Paseo de La Princesa.

The southern portion of the wall extends for about half a mile between La Fortaleza and the Bastión de la Derecha de San Justo y Pastor (the "Left-side Bastion") along the contemporary Paseo de La Princesa, which was the site of a former military prison known as La Princesa Prison. The Bastión de la Concepción, located immediately southeast of La Fortaleza, is the site of the historic Convent of the Servants of Mary, Ministers to the Sick (Convento y Casa de Salud Siervas de María), while the Bastión de las Palmas de San José is today the site of a public square. The Parque de las Palomas and the famous Capilla del Santo Cristo de la Salud are located along the walls between these two bastions.

== Gallery ==
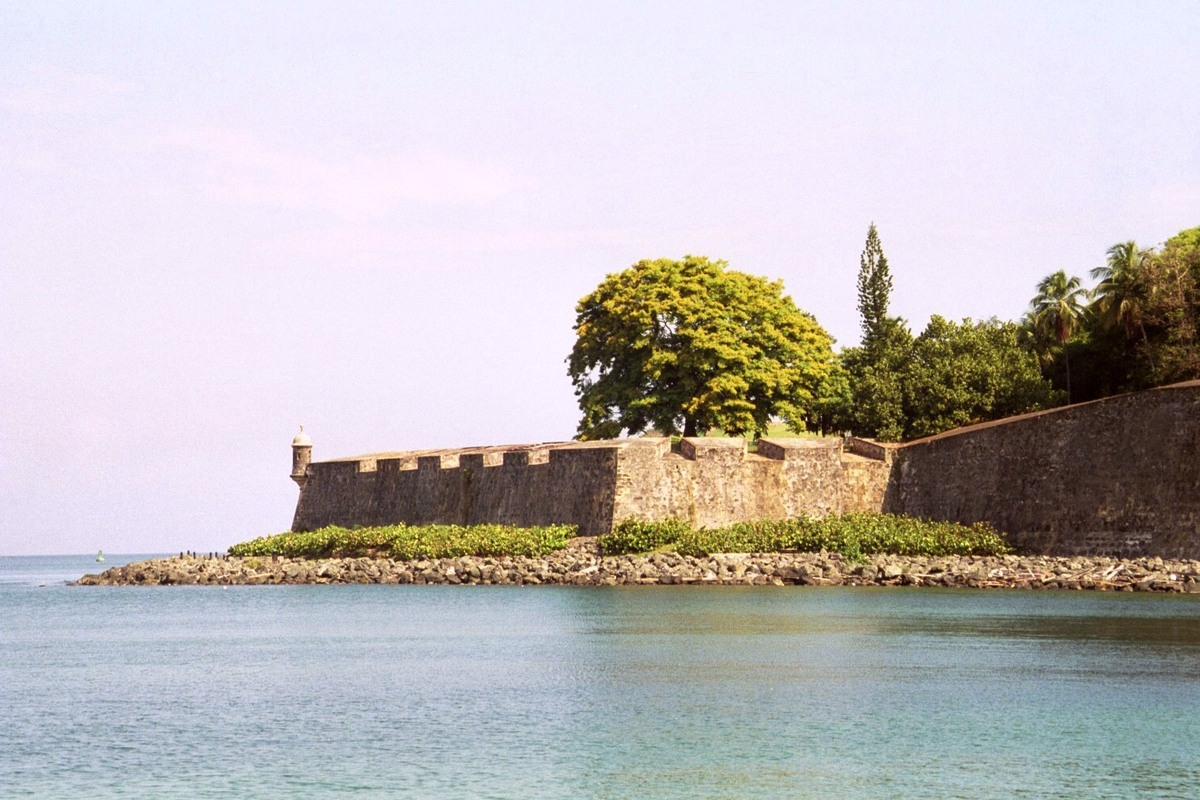
Garita in the San Agustín Bastion along the bay-facing portion of the wall.

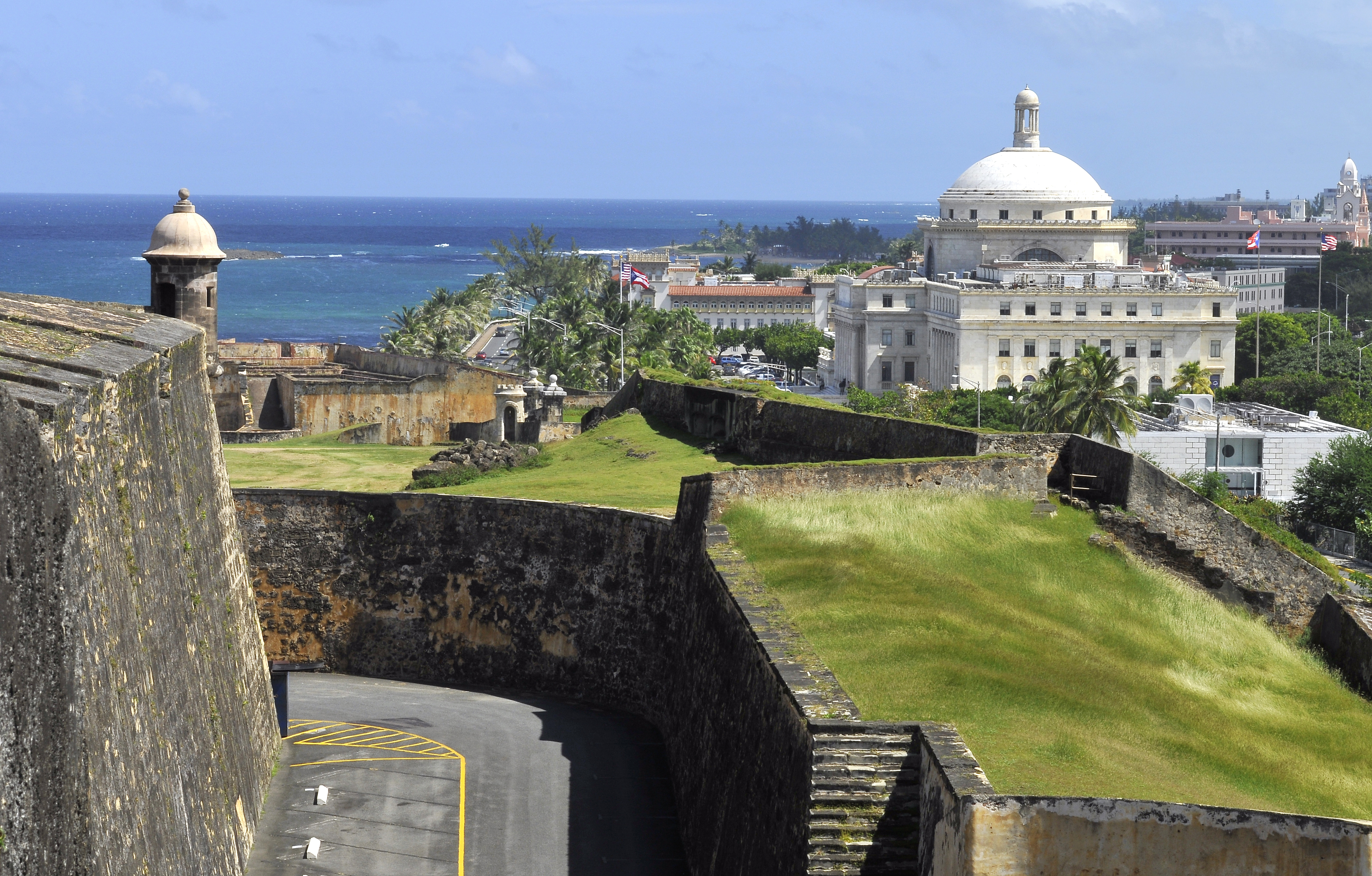
View of the Puerto Rico Capitol from the Santa Elena Battery in San Cristóbal.

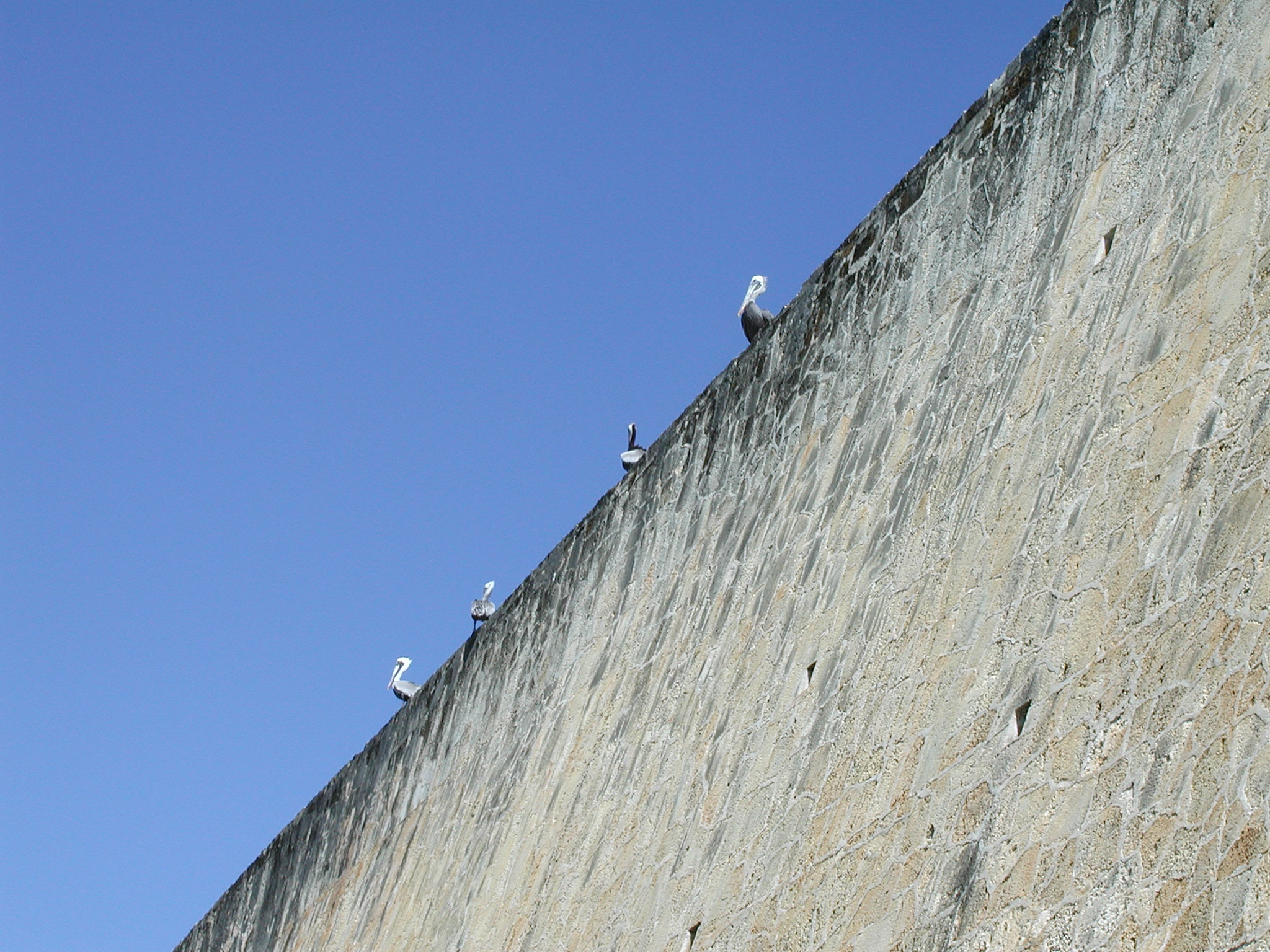
Brown pelicans on the northern wall.

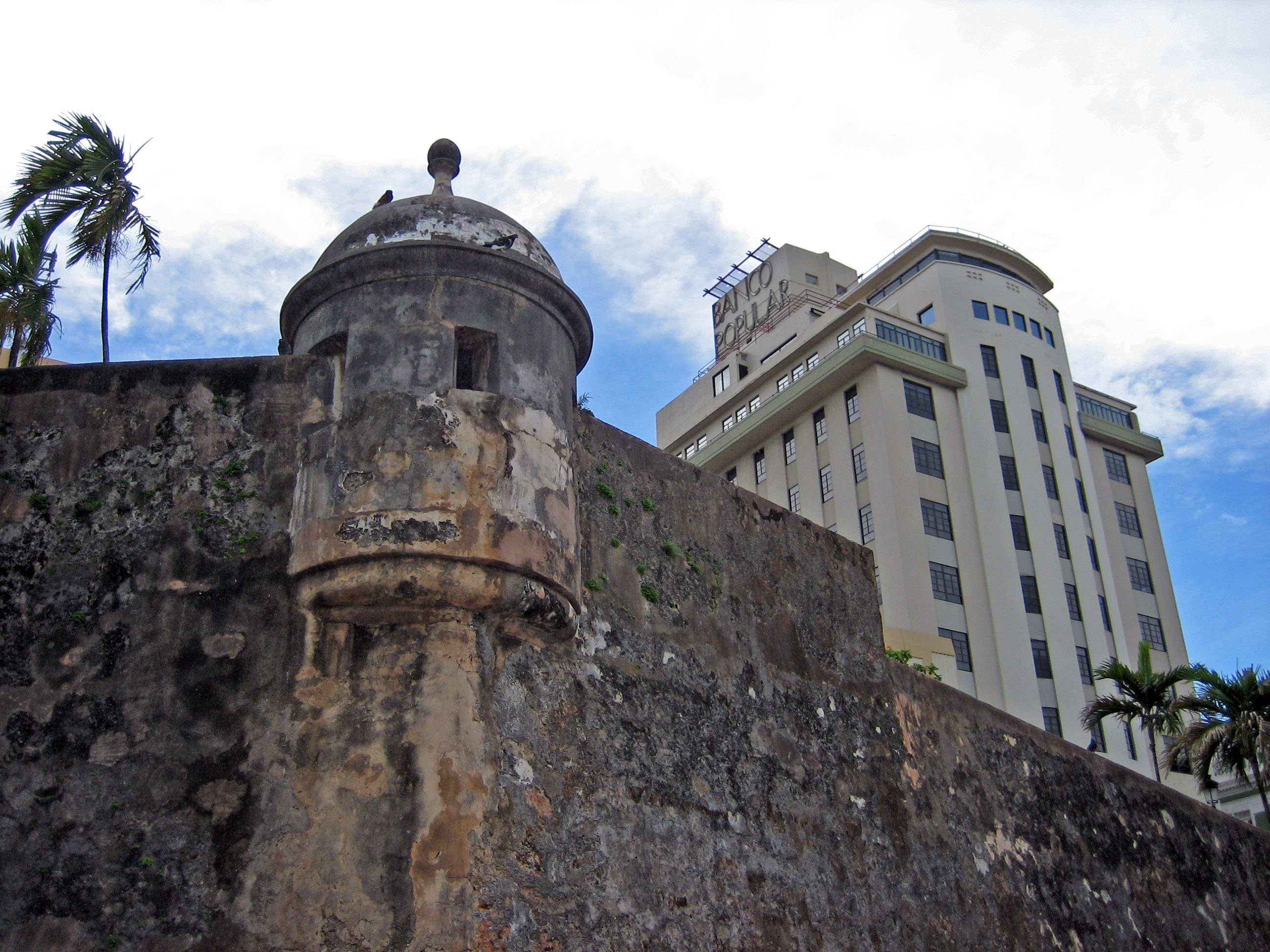
Bastión de la Derecha de San Justo y Pastor

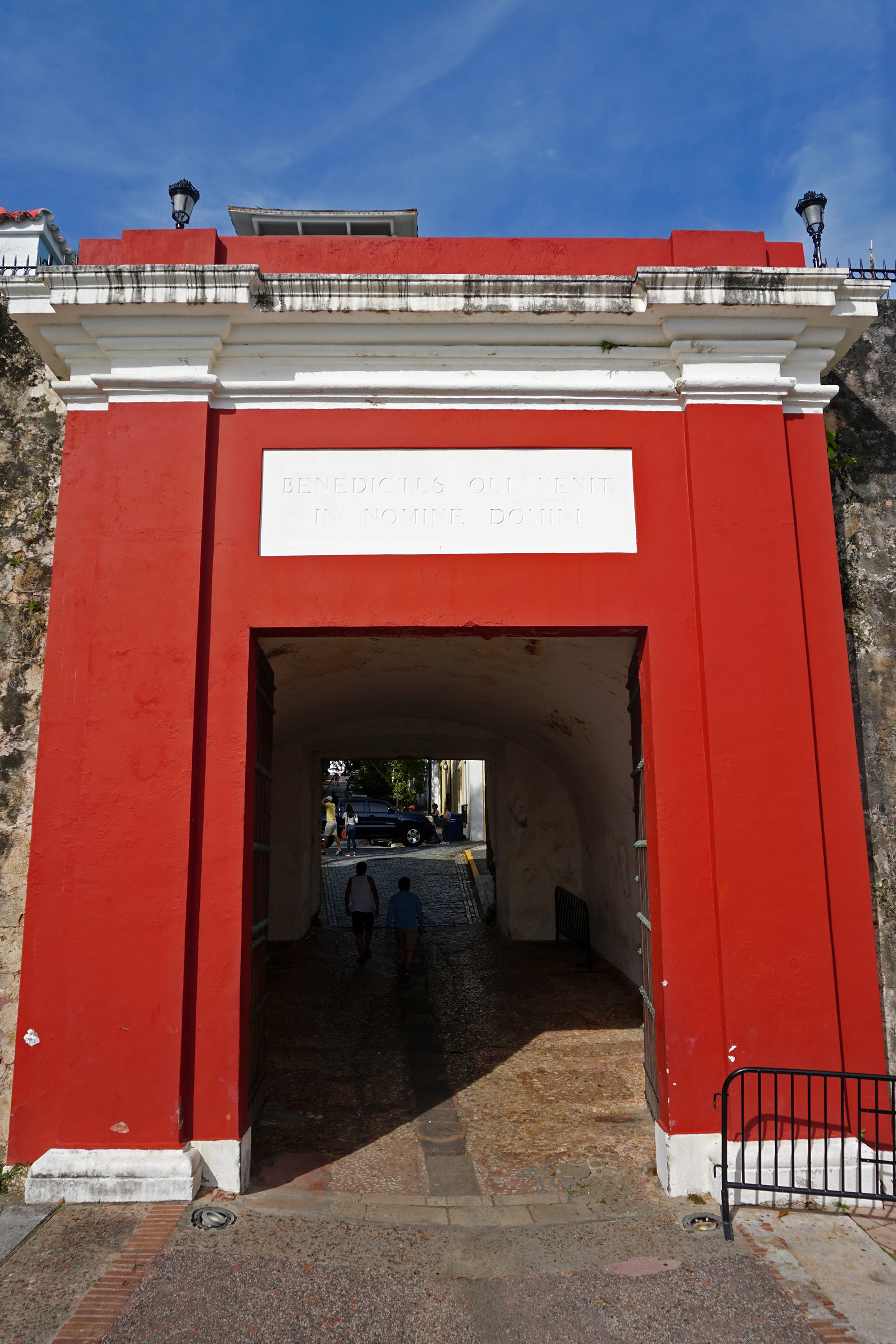
Puerta de San Juan, the only remaining city gate.

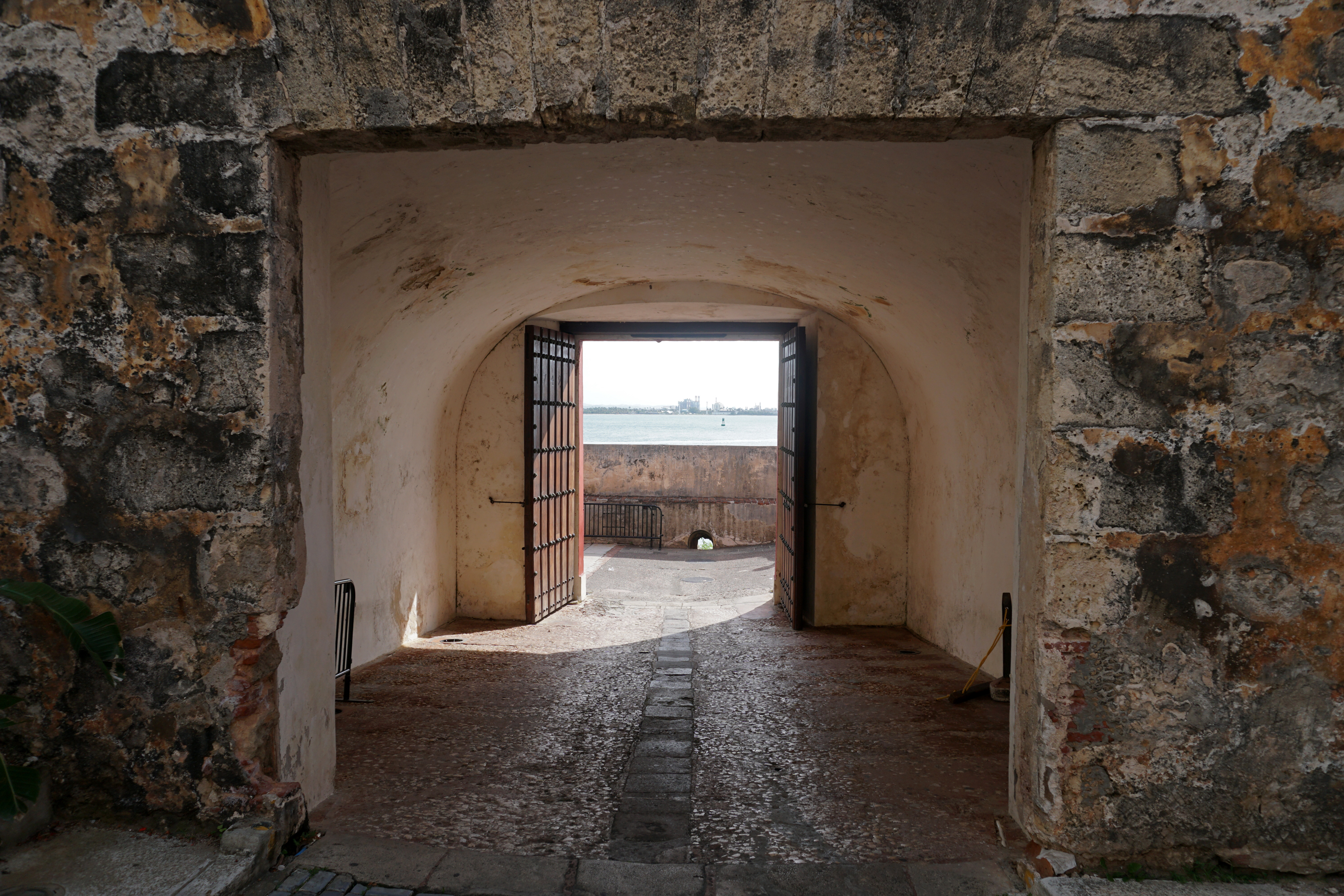
Puerta de San Juan from inside the walls.

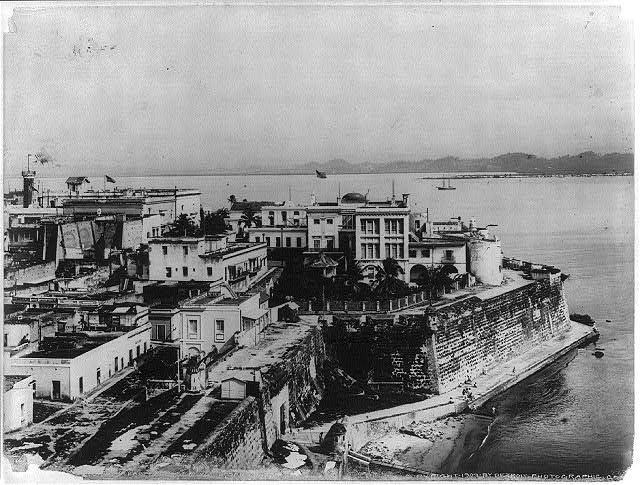
View of the Gate of San Juan (Puerta de Agua) and La Fortaleza, 1901–1903.

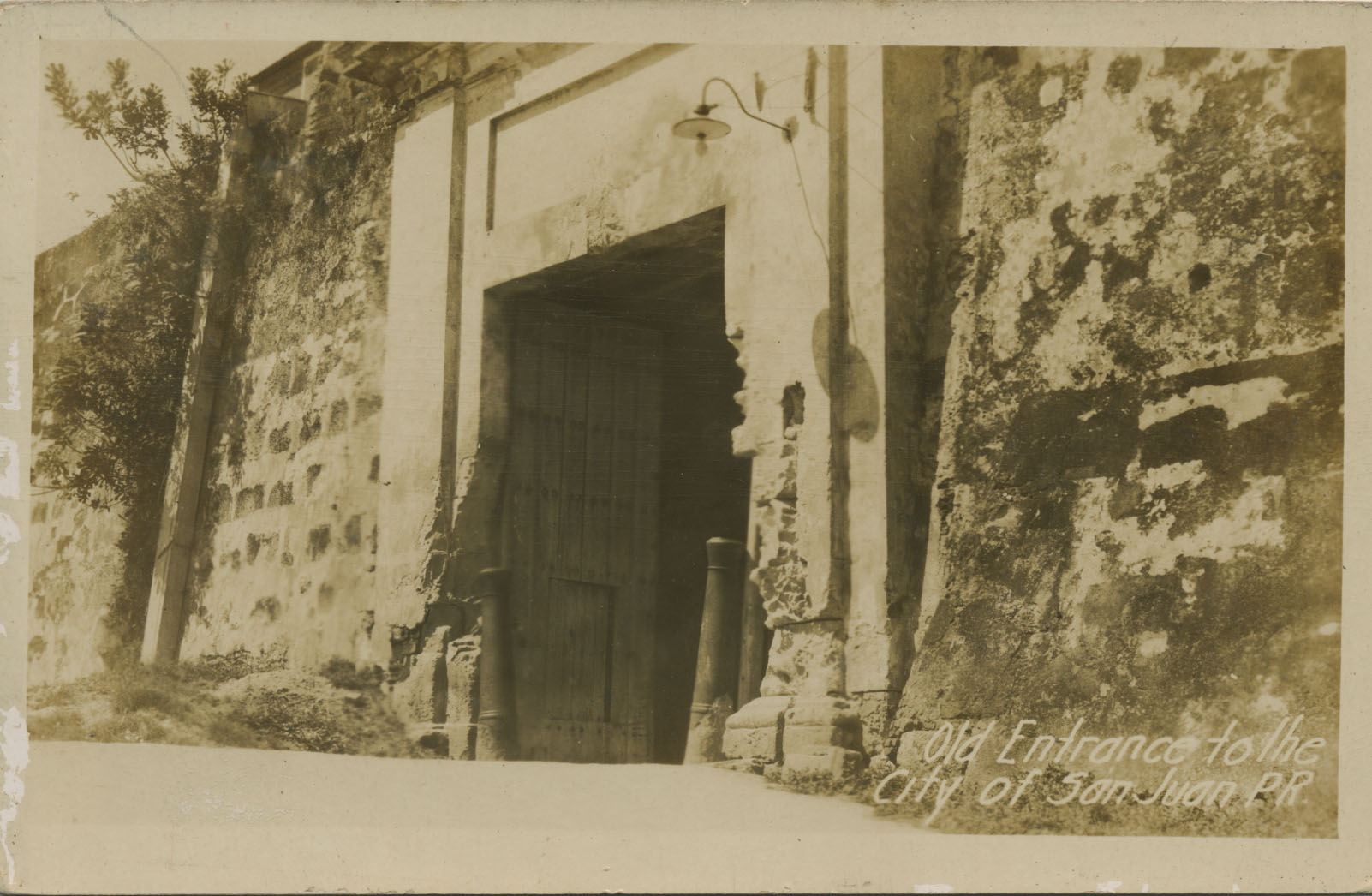
Gate of San Juan before restoration, early 20th century.

== See also ==
- San Juan National Historic Site
