= Hispaniola expedition =

Hispaniola expedition may refer to:

- Hispaniola expedition of 1655, during the Anglo-Spanish War (1654–1660)
- Hispaniola expedition of 1809, during the Napoleonic wars, Spain with the aid of Britain recaptured the island from the French
