= Ramón Power y Giralt =

Puerto Rican politician and Spanish admiral

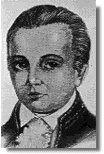
- Born: October 7, 1775; San Juan, Puerto Rico
- Died: June 10, 1813 (aged 37); Cádiz, Spain
- Burial place: Cathedral of San Juan, Puerto Rico
- Military career
- Allegiance: Spanish Navy
- Service years: 1795–1809
- Rank: Captain
- Conflicts: Santo Domingo against an invasion by French forces

Captain Ramón Power y Giralt (October 7, 1775 – June 10, 1813) was a Spanish Navy officer and politician. According to historian Lidio Cruz Monclova, Power was among the first native-born Puerto Ricans to refer to himself as a "Puerto Rican" and to fight for the equal representation of Puerto Rico before the Cortes of Cádiz, the government of Spain at the time.

== Early years ==
Power was born in San Juan, Puerto Rico to Joaquín Power y Morgan, a Spaniard from the Basque Country (of Irish and French descent) who came to Puerto Rico in connection with the Compañía de Asiento de Negros, which regulated the slave trade in the island, and María Josefa Giralt y Santaella, a Catalan from Barcelona. His great-grandfather Peter Power was an Irishman from Waterford who moved to Bordeaux and had a son Jean Baptiste Power Dubernet, who settled in Bilbao, where Ramon’s father Joaquín was born. In San Juan he received his primary education at a private school. In 1788, when he was 13 years old, he was sent to Bilbao, Spain to continue his educational studies.

== Spanish Navy service ==
At the age of 16, Power began his studies of naval science in Spain. Upon graduation he was commissioned a lieutenant in the Spanish Navy and eventually rose to the rank of Captain. In 1795, the Peace of Basel resulted in Spain ceding Santo Domingo to France, but the French did not take possession of the colony. Six years later in 1801, General Toussaint Louverture, a Black commander who was the de facto ruler of the neighboring French colony of Saint-Domingue, occupied Santo Domingo. Louverture's occupation was met with anger by Napoleon, who dispatched an expedition to restore French rule in Saint-Domingue. The expedition's troops captured Santo Domingo from Louverture's army.

In 1808, following Napoleon's invasion of Spain, the criollos of Santo Domingo revolted against French rule. Colonel Rafael Conti, a fellow Puerto Rican, organized an expedition to restore Spanish rule in Santo Domingo. Power served in the expedition, which successfully recaptured Santo Domingo from the French with British assistance.

== Political career ==
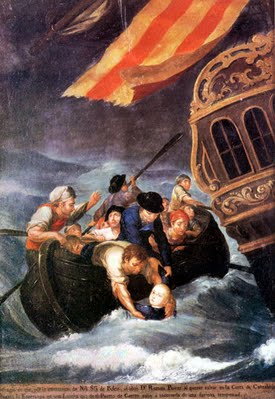
"The Rescue of Don Ramón Power y Giralt", a 1790 painting by José Campeche

On May 4, 1809, in the midst of Peninsular War and Napoleon Bonaparte's occupation of Spain, Power was elected by the five, local cabildos (town councils) to represent Puerto Rico in the Junta Suprema Central y Gubernativa del Reino (Supreme Central and Governing Board of the Kingdom). (In 1808 Napoleon had deposed Ferdinand VII and named his eldest brother, Joseph I, King of Spain. The Junta Suprema was leading the resistance against the Bonapartes.) The Junta Suprema dissolved itself before Power could arrive, nevertheless, the following year on April 16, he was again elected to represent Puerto Rico, this time in the Cortes of Cádiz, the parliamentary assembly serving as a Regency while awaiting Ferdinand VII's return, that had been convened by the Junta and was gathering in the Southern Spanish port of Cádiz. One of his greatest supporters was Bishop Juan Alejo de Arizmendi, who during the official farewell Mass, gave Power his episcopal ring as a reminder that he should never forget his countrymen. After arriving in Cádiz on June 8, 1810, he joined the growing number of delegates, which finally reached a quorum in September.

Power was an avid advocate for Puerto Rico during his tenure (September 24, 1810 — June 10, 1813) as a delegate in the Cortes. On September 25, 1810, the second day of regular meetings, he was elected as vice-president of the Cortes and succeeded in obtaining powers which would benefit the economy of the Puerto Rico. The most well-known product of the assembly was the Constitution of 1812.

Before the Constitution was written, Power convinced the Cortes to reverse a decree of the Council of Regency which had given the governor of Puerto Rico extraordinary powers in reaction to the establishment of juntas in South America. The highlight of his legislative career was the Ley Power ("the Power Act"), which designated five ports for free commerce. Thus, the ports of Fajardo, Mayagüez, Aguadilla, Cabo Rojo and Ponce established the reduction of most tariffs and eliminated the flour monopoly, in addition to establishing other economic reforms with the goal of developing a more efficient economy. It also called for the establishment of a Sociedad Económica de Amigos del País en Puerto Rico on the island, which was approved in 1814. Many of these reforms remained in effect even after Ferdinand VII revoked the Spanish Constitution.

== Death ==
Power died while still in Cádiz on June 10, 1813, from the yellow fever epidemic which had spread throughout Europe. He was succeeded in the Cortes by José María Quiñones who served from November 25, 1813, to May 10, 1814. He was buried at the Oratorio de San Felipe Neri church in Cádiz.

== Repatriation of remains ==
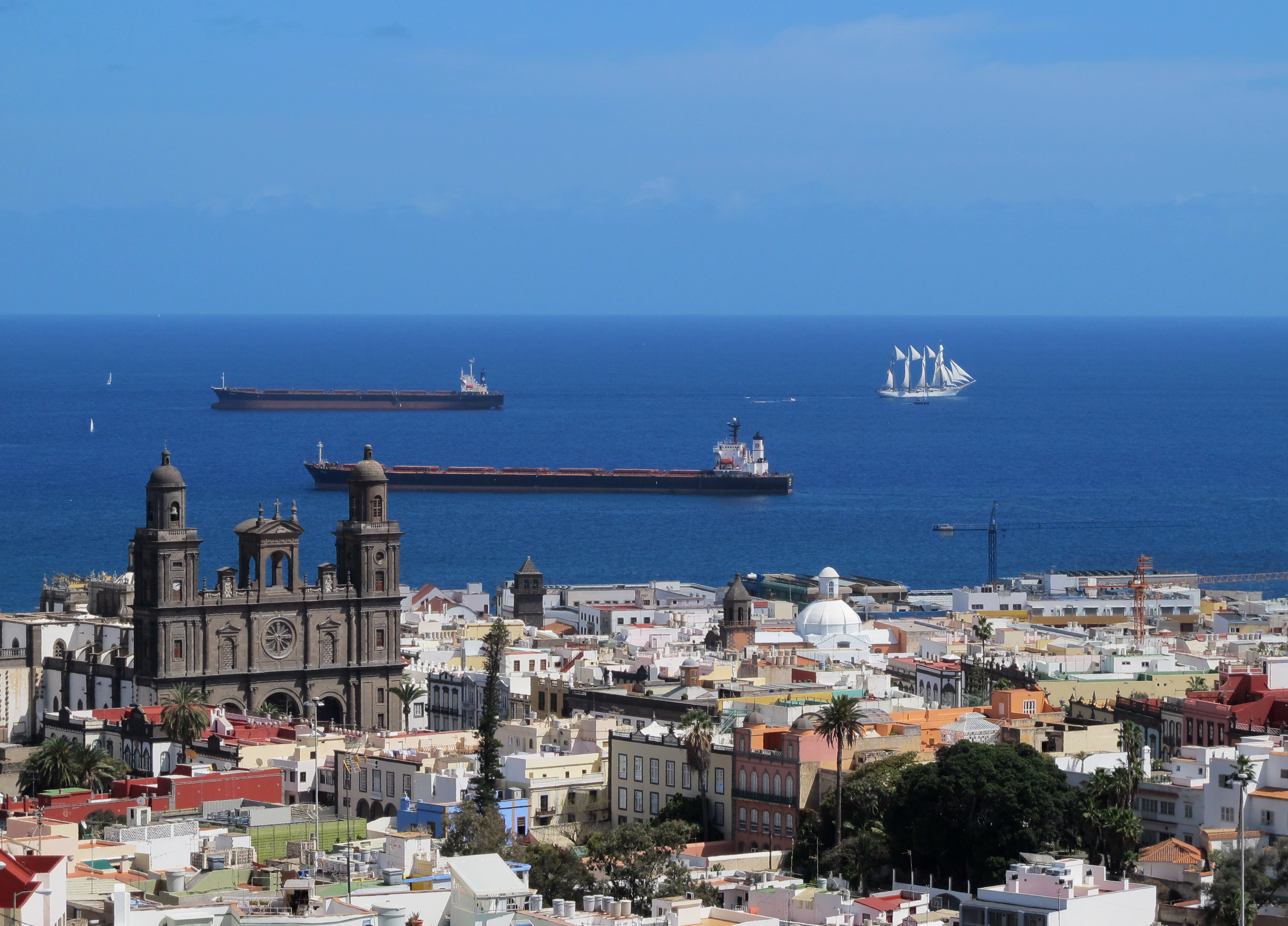
The Spanish ship Juan Sebastián Elcano in the distance leaving Las Palmas transferring the remains to San Juan (2013)

According to The San Juan Star (Puerto Rico's English-language newspaper), a movement led by the Archbishop of San Juan, Roberto González Nieves, was successful in its attempt to bring Power's remains back to Puerto Rico. Power's remains were exhumed where he was interred along with other delegates' to the Cortes, at the church in Cadiz.

After DNA testing, the remains were brought by the Spanish tall ship Juan Sebastián Elcano. On March 2, 2013, it left the port of Cádiz, stopping at Las Palmas de Gran Canaria, Canary Islands before leaving on March 10 across the Atlantic Ocean taking 28 days to return Power y Giralt's body to San Juan, Puerto Rico on April 6, 2013. It was escorted by the United States Coast Guard into the port and received with a 21 gun salute. Present to receive the remains were the Governor of Puerto Rico, and presidents of all branches of government. His resting place now is at the Cathedral of San Juan Bautista next to Bishop Juan Alejo de Arizmendi.

== Honors and tributes ==
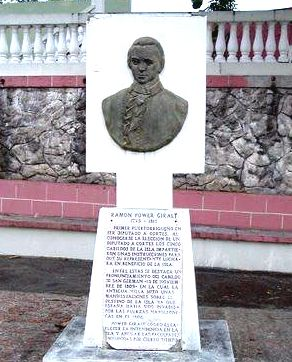
Plaque honoring Power in San Germán

Both Puerto Rico and Spain have honored Power's memory, by naming several avenues after him. San Juan also has a school named after Power the "Ramon Power y Giralt School" located in Calle Loiza Final. The city of Ponce has a street named after him; it runs west to east and is located between (i.e., parallel to) Calle Ferrocarril and Avenida Las Américas, and has its western terminus at Calle Concordia and its eastern terminus at Avenida Hostos.

His former residence was restored and currently houses the Puerto Rico Conservation Trust in Old San Juan. Power's contemporary, José Campeche, honored him in a painting entitled The Shipwreck of Power. Graphic artist Lorenzo Homar has also dedicated one of his artistic works to Ramón Power.

== Ancestry ==
Ancestors of Ramón Power y Giralt

8. Peter Power; Waterford, Waterford City, Waterford, Ireland
4. Jean Baptiste Power Dubernet; b. 1686 Bordeaux, Gironde, Aquitaine, France
9. Francoise Dubernet
2. Don Joaquin Ramon Power y Morgan; b. 1725 Bilbao, Biscay, Basque Country, Spain
10. Michael Morgan Lincoln; Waterford, Ireland
5. Ana María Morgan Hor; b. 1702, Bilbao, Biscay, Basque Country, Spain
11. Maria Ana Hor Kelly; B. 7 Dec 1679, Bilbao, Biscay, Spain
1. Ramón Power y Giralt; (October 7, 1775 – June 10, 1813) San Juan, Puerto Rico
6.
3. María Josefa Giralt Santaelle; b. 1753 Barcelona, Spain
7.

== See also ==
- List of Puerto Ricans
- Irish immigration to Puerto Rico
- List of Puerto Rican military personnel
