= Domingo Crisanto Delgado Gómez =

Spanish composer (1806–1858)

- Born: 1806; Güímar, Tenerife, Spain
- Died: 1858 (aged 51–52); San Juan, Captaincy General of Puerto Rico, Spanish Empire
- Occupations: Composer, organist

Domingo Crisanto Delgado Gómez (1806, Güímar, Tenerife, Spain – 1858, San Juan, Puerto Rico) was one of the most famous composers of the nineteenth century Canary Islands; and first organist of the Cathedral of San Juan Bautista in Puerto Rico.

== Early life ==
He born in 1806 in the town of Güímar on the island of Tenerife. In 1821 he became a cantor in the music chapel of La Laguna Cathedral of his native island. Then he stood out for his talent and wrote numerous scores for the cathedral and the Convento de Santa Catalina de Siena.

== Career ==
Crisanto was choirmaster apprentice, his teacher was Miguel Jurado Bustamante, who was succeeded by Manuel Fragoso in 1828. Domingo Crisanto served as assistant sochantre as second organist at the La Laguna Cathedral and remarkable composer. He learned to play the violin and worked as a music teacher. After the death of Bustamante and due to the illness of Fragoso, Crisanto kept hoping to be appointed choirmaster at the La Laguna Cathedral, a distinction which would never happen.

== Moving to Puerto Rico ==
For these reasons and looking for new professional horizons, he moved to Puerto Rico where he joined the music chapel of the Cathedral of San Juan Bautista. In Puerto Rico he became one of the greatest musicians of this country, where he held the positions of 2nd sochantre, substitute organist and greater organist, the latter title he held until death; for the past eight years he was also a professor of organ and composition. When Crisanto was a teacher he had among his students the composer Felipe Gutiérrez y Espinosa.

== See also ==
- List of Spanish composers
