= Santa Maria Madre della Provvidenza a Monte Verde =

- Church of Holy Mary Mother of Providence in Monteverde
- Chiesa di Santa Maria Madre della Provvidenza
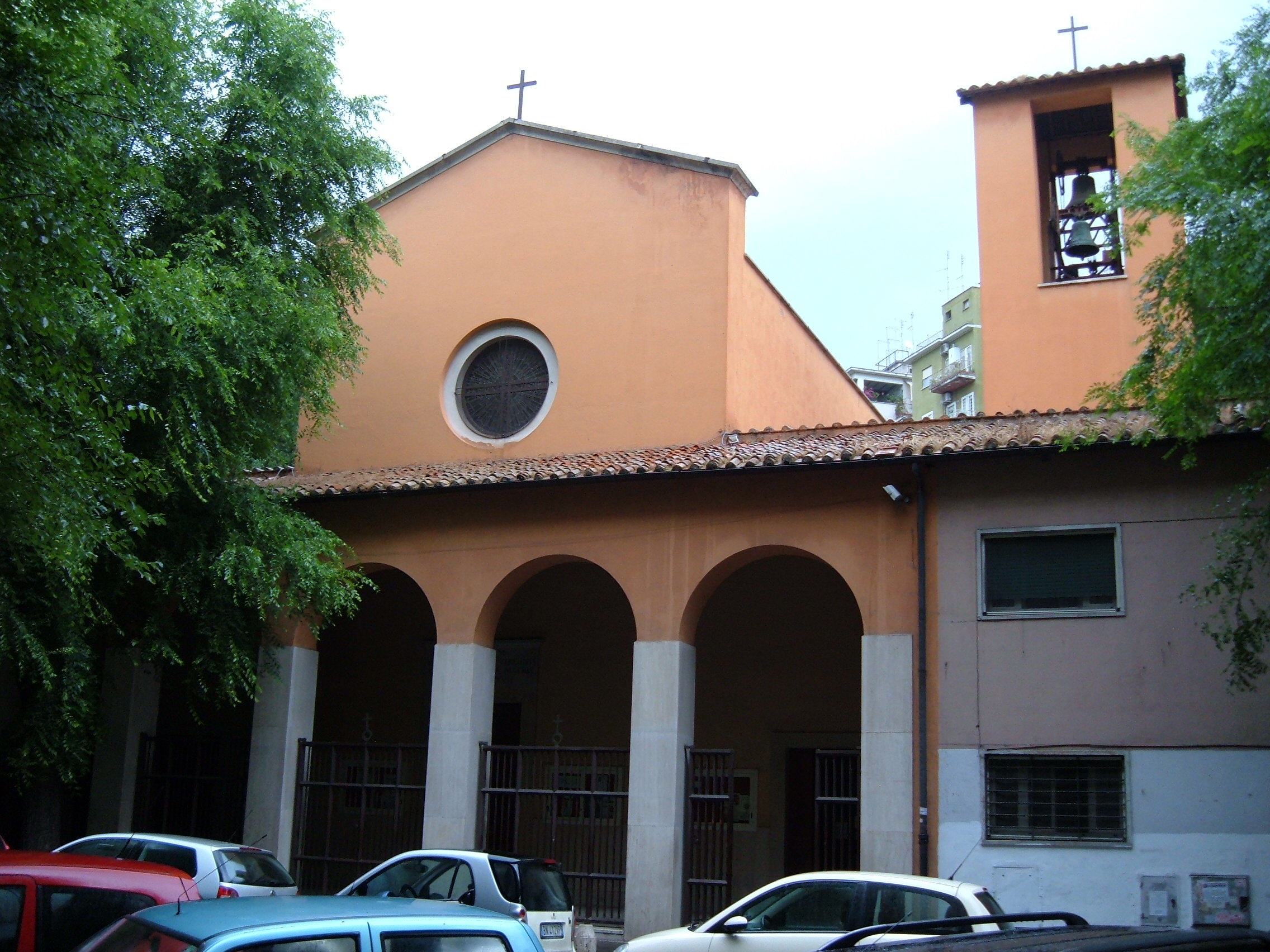
- Facade
- Click on the map for a fullscreen view
- 41°52′42″N 12°27′09″E
- Location: Via di Donna Olimpia 35, Rome
- Country: Italy
- Language: Italian
- Denomination: Catholic
- Tradition: Roman Rite
- Website: parrocchiaprovvidenza.com

History
- Status: titular church
- Founded: 1937
- Dedication: Mary, mother of Jesus (as Our Lady of Providence)
- Consecrated: 1937

Architecture
- Architect: Tullio Rossi
- Architectural type: Modern
- Completed: 1937

Administration
- Diocese: Rome

Santa Maria Madre della Provvidenza a Monte Verde is a 20th-century parochial church and titular church in Rome, dedicated to Our Lady of Providence. It is located in the Monteverde area, 2.5 km (1.6 mi) south of Vatican City.

== History ==
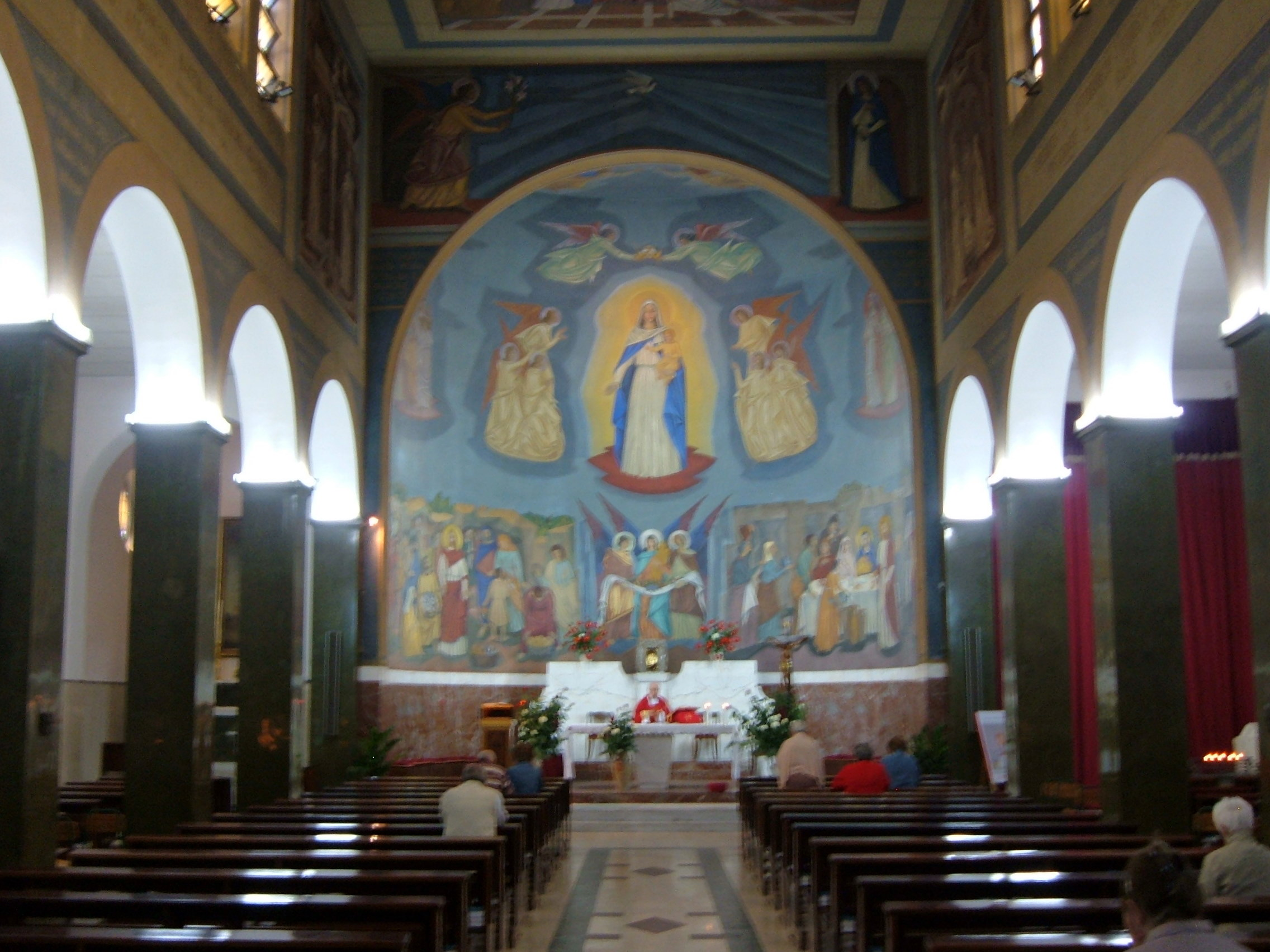
View of interior, with frescoes by Igino Cupelloni (1959).

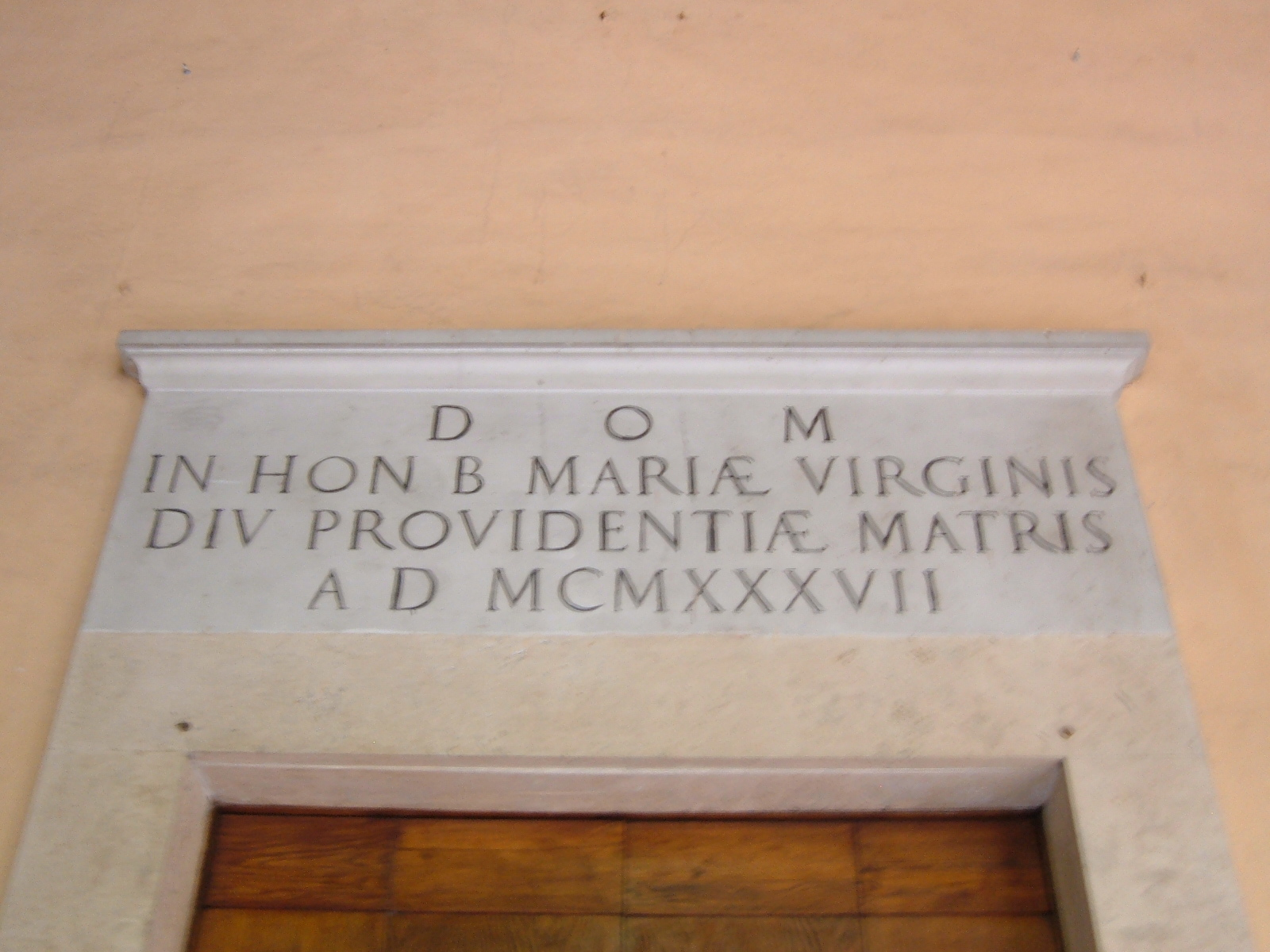
Dedicatory plaque

The church was built in 1937, its construction ordered by Cardinal Francesco Marchetti Selvaggiani. It was originally intended for the Barnabites, but has been administered by parish clergy since its opening.

In 1969, it was made a titular church to be held by a cardinal-priest.

Titulars

- Luis Aponte Martínez (1973–2012)
- Orani João Tempesta (2014–present)
