= José and Francisco Díaz =

Sergeants who defended Puerto Rico against British invasion in 1797

José Díaz
- Born: 1776; Toa Alta, Puerto Rico, Spanish Empire
- Died: April 30, 1797 (aged 20–21); San Juan, Puerto Rico, Spanish Empire
- Military career
- Allegiance: Puerto Rican Militia
- Rank: Sergeant Major
- Nickname: "Pepe"
- Unit: Toa Alta Militia
- Conflicts: Defense of San Juan (1797); • The battle

José "Pepe" Díaz (1776 (Note: Historian Eduardo Neumann Gandia states Jose Diaz was from Ponce and that he was born in 1774. He also states "historians do not say anything about this brave soldier whose courage was brought to light for the first time by this author [i.e., Neumann himself] and which fact garnished the author a gold medal award at a public contest sponsored by the Sociedad Economica de Amigos del Pais." (See, Eduardo Neumann Gandia. Verdadera y Autentica Historia de la Ciudad de Ponce. 1913. Reprinted in 1987 by Instituto de Cultura Puertorriqueña. San Juan, Puerto Rico. p. 259.)) – April 30, 1797) and Francisco Díaz (1777 – ?) were two cousins who served as Sergeants in the Toa Alta Militia. Both cousins helped defeat Sir Ralph Abercromby and defend Puerto Rico during an invasion in 1797.

== Early years ==
The Díaz cousins were born and raised in the town of Toa Alta, Puerto Rico when the island was a Spanish territory. They were both Sergeants in the Toa Alta Militia, and with their unit were sent to defend San Juan upon the attempted invasion of the island by British forces under the command of Sir Ralph Abercromby.

== Defense of Puerto Rico ==
On February 17, 1797, the appointed governor of Puerto Rico, Brigadier Ramón de Castro, received the news that the British had captured the island of Trinidad. Believing that Puerto Rico would be the next British objective, he decided to put the local militia on alert and to prepare the island's forts against any military action.

== Battle of San Juan ==
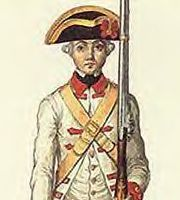
Type of uniform worn by the local militia, distinct from Spanish Army regulars.

On April 17, 1797, British ships under the command of Sir Ralph Abercromby were unable to penetrate the defenses of "El Morro" and opted to make their attack from the coastal town of Loíza, to the east of San Juan. On April 18, British soldiers and German mercenaries ("Hessians") landed on Loíza's beach.

On April 20, the British tried to establish a battery on the Cerro del Condado overlooking the Spanish positions to the East. José Díaz set out with 50 men to contain an attack which was being attempted at the rear.

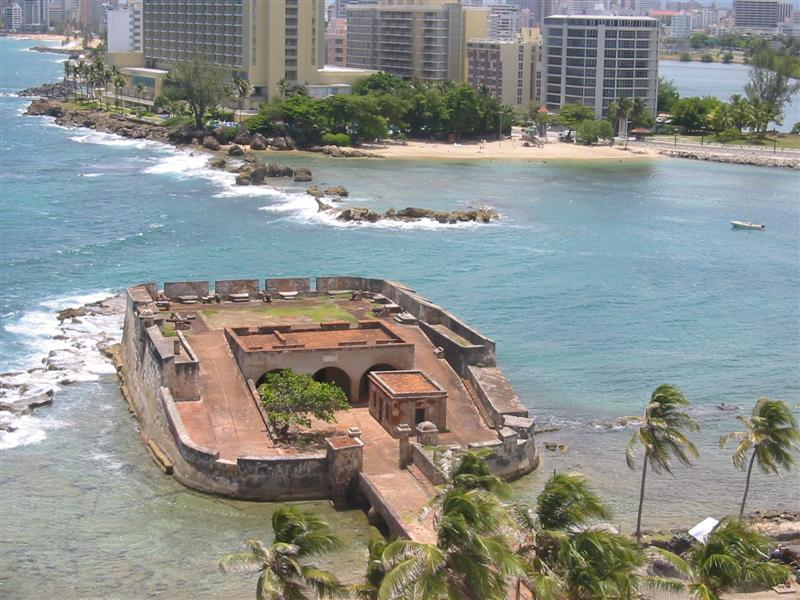
Fortín de San Gerónimo was key to the defense of San Juan.

On April 24, Sergeant Francisco Díaz was chosen to lead a raid against the enemy. He had 70 volunteers, 20 from the Disciplined Militias and 50 from men being sent to prison. At daybreak they set out in pirogues (a small, flat-bottomed boat), supported by two gunboats, passing down the San Antonio Channel and landed close to the enemy trenches and batteries. The Spanish artillery batteries had previously laid down a heavy covering barrage, and as soon as they saw that Francisco Díaz and his troops had landed, they were ordered to maintain and fire only gunpowder from the cannons without firing the cannonballs. The batteries were also prepared to provide cover in case a retreat was necessary.

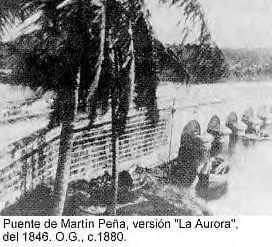
Martín Peña Bridge

Unable to penetrate the firepower of El Morro and the other fortresses, the British twice tried to take the Martín Peña Bridge, a key passage to the San Juan islet. On April 30, when the British made their second attempt, Sergeant Major José Díaz was among the 800 men assembled by Capt. Luis de Lara to protect the Martín Peña Bridge. The men reached the bridge, but were soon attacked by the British. Capt. de Lara responded with his own battery and he directed his cavalry to the flanks and opened up with musket fire. Among those who died in the battle was Sergeant Major José Díaz who was struck by a shell at the bridge.

== Aftermath ==
The invasion failed because of an unexpectedly spirited defense of the island by the garrison. The continuous flow of reinforcements from various towns of Puerto Rico into San Juan, the inability to break through the line of the forts San Antonio and San Gerónimo, and the counterattacking pressure and surprisingly sophisticated battle tactics of the militia and cavalry at the Martín Peña bridge were proved too much for the British. The British retreated on April 30 to their ships and on May 2 set sail northward. Governor Ramon de Castro petitioned Spanish King Charles IV for recognition for the victors; he was promoted to field marshal, Sergeant Major José "Pepe" Díaz was posthumously named "The King of Spain's Bravest Soldier", Sergeant Francisco Díaz was promoted to Lieutenant and was given a pay raise.

Lt. Francisco Díaz was married to Isabel de Castro, who was awarded a monthly pension by the government upon his death. His granddaughter, Isabel Matilde Díaz y Ruiz, married Román Baldorioty de Castro.

== Legacy ==
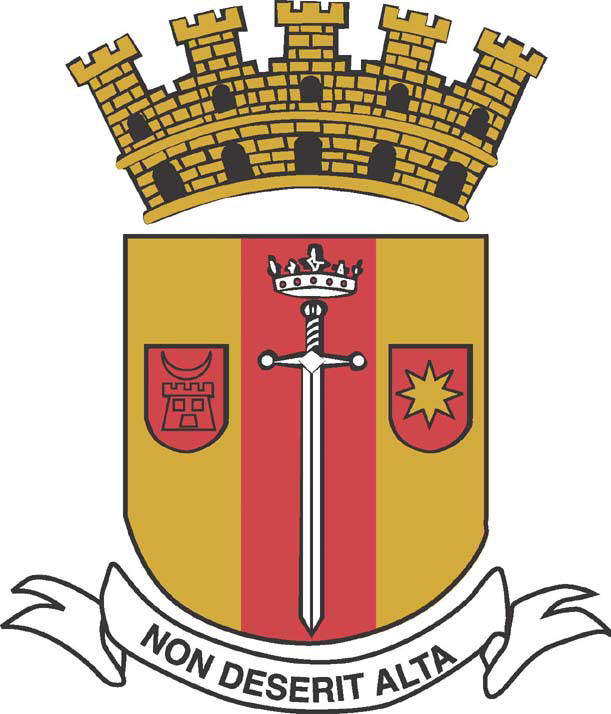
Right small shield with the star and eight rays honor José and Francisco Díaz

The people of Toa Alta have honored the Díaz cousins in the design of the town's coat of arms. The right small shield with the star and eight rays, represent Francisco Díaz and his cousin José, who gave his life in the defense of the Martín Peña bridge. In the Spanish heraldic the star is symbol of the last name Díaz... which means "Son of Diego".

Sergeant Major José Díaz has also become part of the islands folklore. Puerto Rican "Jíbaro's" (peasants) sang the following "copla" (ballad) about him:

| Spanish (original version) | English translation |
|---|---|
| En el puente Martin Peña Mataron a Pepe Díaz; Que era el hombre más valiente Que el Rey de España tenía. | On the bridge of Martin Peña Pepe Díaz was killed He was the bravest man that the King of Spain had. |

The statue of Juan Ponce de León situated in the Plaza de San José in Old San Juan was made from the cannons left behind by Sir Ralph Abercromby and his men.

== See also ==
- List of Puerto Ricans
- List of Puerto Rican military personnel
- Military history of Puerto Rico
- Colonel Rafael Conti
