= Juan Alejo de Arizmendi =

First Puerto Rican Roman Catholic bishop

Bishop Juan Alejo de Arizmendi
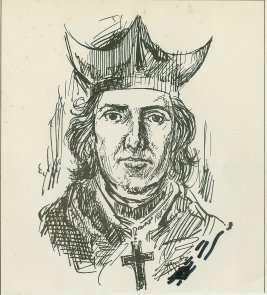
- Alejo de Arizmendi was the first Puerto Rican to be consecrated Bishop.
- Born: July 17, 1760; San Juan, Puerto Rico, Viceroyalty of New Spain
- Died: October 12, 1814 (aged 54); Arecibo, Puerto Rico, Viceroyalty of New Spain
- Occupation: priest

Notes
- His remains are in the Cathedral of San Juan Bautista, in Puerto Rico.

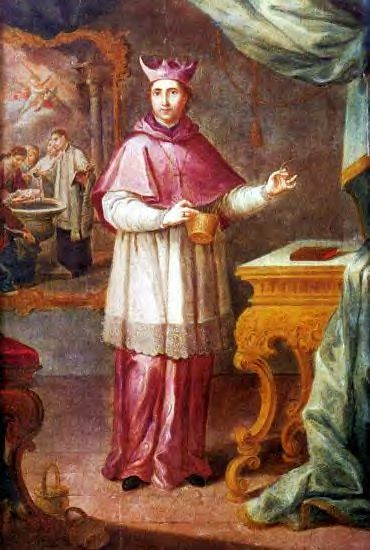
Painting of Arizmendi by Jose Campeche

Bishop Juan Alejo de Arizmendi (July 17, 1760 – October 12, 1814) was a patriot and the first Puerto Rican to be consecrated Bishop.

== Early years ==
Arizmendi de la Torre (birth name: Juan Alejo de Arizmendi y de la Torre) was born in San Juan, Puerto Rico, and there he studied in the convent of the Dominican Friars. He then went to Caracas, Venezuela. where he studied Canonical and Civil Law. He earned his doctorate in the Dominican Republic and on July 16, 1785, was ordained a priest.

== First Puerto Rican Bishop ==
In 1803, the King of Spain, Carlos IV, made a petition to the Catholic Church, to have Arizmendi named Bishop. On March 25, 1804 Pope Pius VII consecrated Arizmendi, Bishop of San Juan.

Upon his return to Puerto Rico, Arizmendi dedicated himself to charity. He was especially interested in helping the poor and needy. Arizmendi financially supported the Hospital of the Conception of San Juan, with money from his own pockets. During his free time, he would make baskets of straw and sell them. He would then use the money to buy clothes, food and other items for the poor. Arizmendi, took it upon himself to nurse and to take care of the sick. He was the founder of the Conciliar Seminary in San Juan. In 1804, Rafael Cordero, a Puerto Rican of African ancestry who was to become known as "The Father of Public Education in Puerto Rico", received the sacrament of Confirmation from the hands of Bishop Arizmendi.

== Patriot ==
He was a stern supporter of Ramón Power y Giralt when this Puerto Rican-born veteran of the Spanish navy and past frigate Captain was elected to represent Puerto Rico in front of the Spanish Courts in Cádiz. Arizmendi gave Ramon Power his episcopal ring, "as sure pledge that will sustain you in the memory of your resolution to protect and maintain the rights of our fellow countrymen, as I myself am resolved to die for my beloved flock". For Arizmendi this was also a national symbol of Puerto Rico by joining his country and God in his heart This occurred in 1809, and is the first known use of the word "puertorriqueño" (Puerto Rican). Arizmendi's statement may have inspired the seizure in 1810 of all ecclesiastical stipends by the royal treasury.

In 1814, after traveling around the island in his second pastoral visit he fell ill in Hormigueros in whose Hermitage, now the Basilica Menor de la Virgen de Monserrate, he desired to be buried. Bishop Juan Alejo de Arizmendi died in the City of Arecibo, Puerto Rico on October 12, 1814. His remains are in the Cathedral of San Juan Bautista, in Puerto Rico.

== Honors and recognitions ==
Arizmendi was immortalized by Puerto Rican artist Jose Campeche in a painting in 1803. Puerto Rico has honored Arizmendi's memory by naming schools and avenues after him. The University of Puerto Rico has an Institute of Historic Studies Juan Alejo de Arizmendi. The Catholic Church also has a medal called the "Bishop Juan Alejo de Arizmendi Medal".

== See also ==
- List of Puerto Ricans
