= Our Lady of Providence =

Epithet of Mary, mother of Jesus

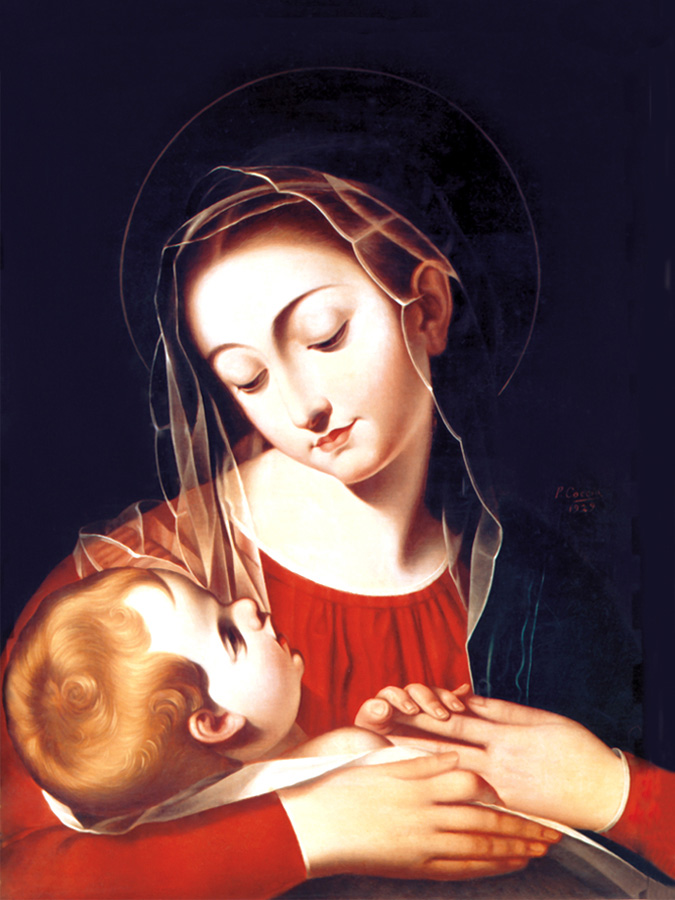
"Mater Divinae Providentiae," by Scipione Pulzone

Our Lady of Providence or Our Lady of Divine Providence is a title of Mary. Her feast day is celebrated on 19 November.

== History ==
The title of Mary, Mother of Divine Providence is often attributed due to her intervention at the wedding at Cana.

Devotion to Our Lady of Divine Providence originated in Italy, and spread to France and Spain. The devotion was brought to Puerto Rico in the early 1850s by the Servite Order. According to tradition, Philip Benizi (1233 – 1285) prayed to Mary for help in providing food for his friars, and subsequently found several baskets of provisions left at the door of the convent. Our Lady of Providence was declared the patroness of Puerto Rico by Pope Paul VI on November 19, 1969. Her feast day is celebrated in many Puerto Rican communities.

Around 1580, the Italian painter Scipione Pulzone created a work titled "Divinae Providentiae, which depicted the Virgin Mary cradling the Infant Jesus. Devotion to Mary, Mother of Divine Providence in the first house of the Congregation of the Clerics Regular of St. Paul (Barnabites) in Rome at San Carlo ai Catinari church began around year 1611, when one of the clerics traveled to Loreto to pray for assistance in finding the financial resources to complete the Church of San Carlo. Upon his return, they received the necessary assistance, and the Barnabites began to promote devotion to Our Lady of Providence.

Pulzone's painting was given to the Barnabites in 1663. It was placed on the altar of a chapel on the first floor of the Saint Charles rectory behind the main altar. In 1732, a copy of the painting was placed in a location adjacent to the main altar of the church of San Carlo ai Catinari in Rome, where it drew many faithful visitors.

In 1774, Pope Benedict XIV authorized the Confraternity of Our Lady of Providence, a lay organization created for the purpose of promoting special works of Christian charity or piety. Pope Gregory XVI elevated it to an Archconfraternity in 1839. In 1888, Pope Leo XIII ordered the solemn crowning of the "Miraculous Lady" and approved the Mass and Office of Mary, Mother of Divine Providence. On August 5, 1896, Superior General of the Barnabites Father Benedict Nisser decreed that every Barnabite have a copy of the painting in their home.

== Patronage ==
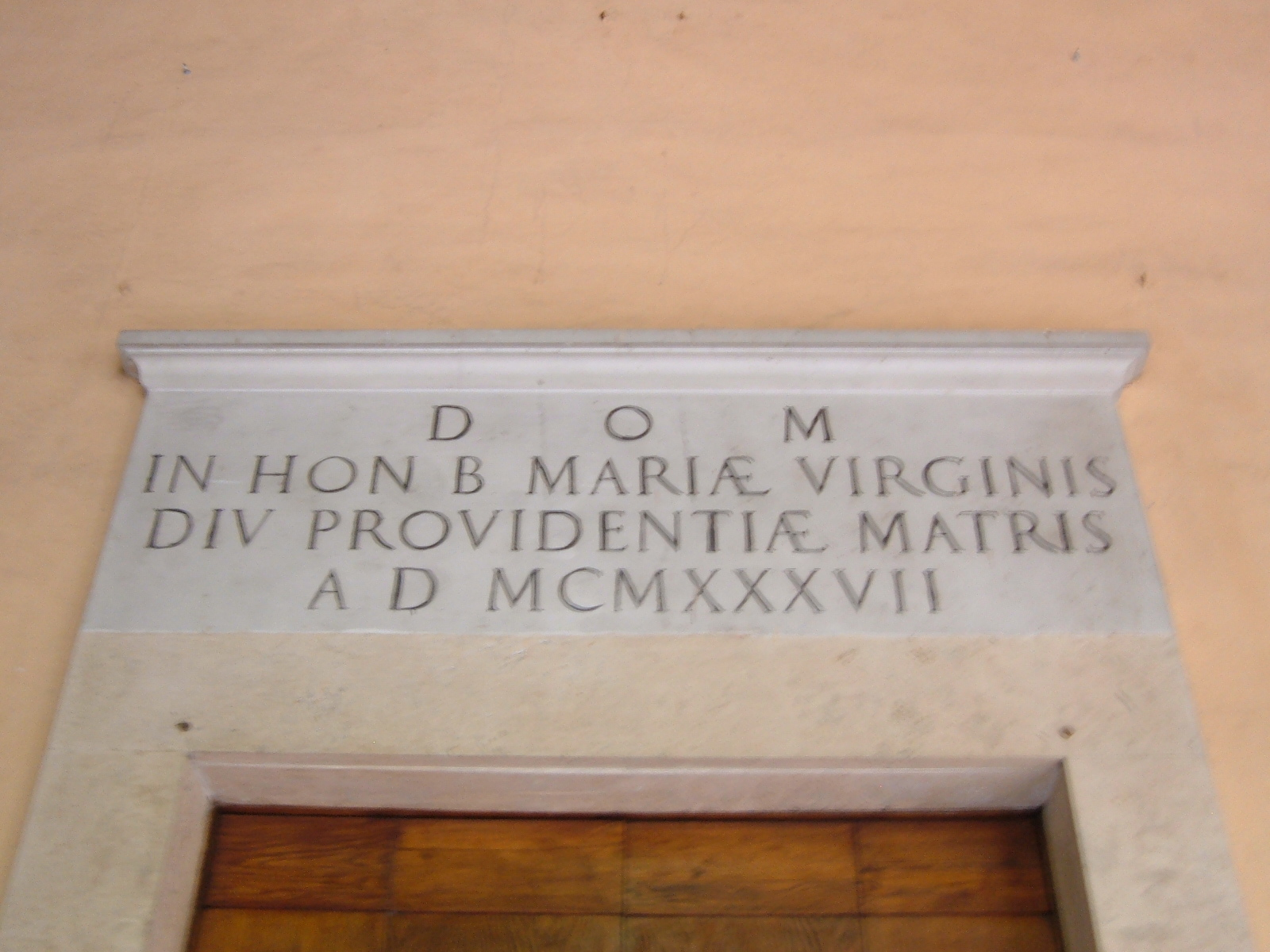
Dedicatory plaque at Santa Maria Madre della Provvidenza a Monte Verde, Rome, with Latin text Providentiæ Matris

Our Lady of Providence is the patroness of Indiana and the Roman Catholic Diocese of Providence, Rhode Island. The chapel of Saint Vincent Hospital in Worcester, Massachusetts is dedicated to Our Lady of Providence.

Our Lady of Divine Providence is the patroness of St. Benedict's Abbey in Atchison, Kansas. Our Lady of Divine Providence is also the patroness of the Our Lady of Divine Providence House of Prayer, Inc., a 501(c)3 organization and ministry in Clearwater, Florida. The organization is dedicated to fostering spiritual growth among clergy and laity alike.

Our Lady of Divine Providence is the patroness of the Caribbean island of Puerto Rico, where a parish is dedicated to her.

Santa Maria Madre della Provvidenza a Monte Verde is a church in Rome, built in 1937 and a titular church since 1969.

== U.S. National Shrine of Our Lady of Providence ==
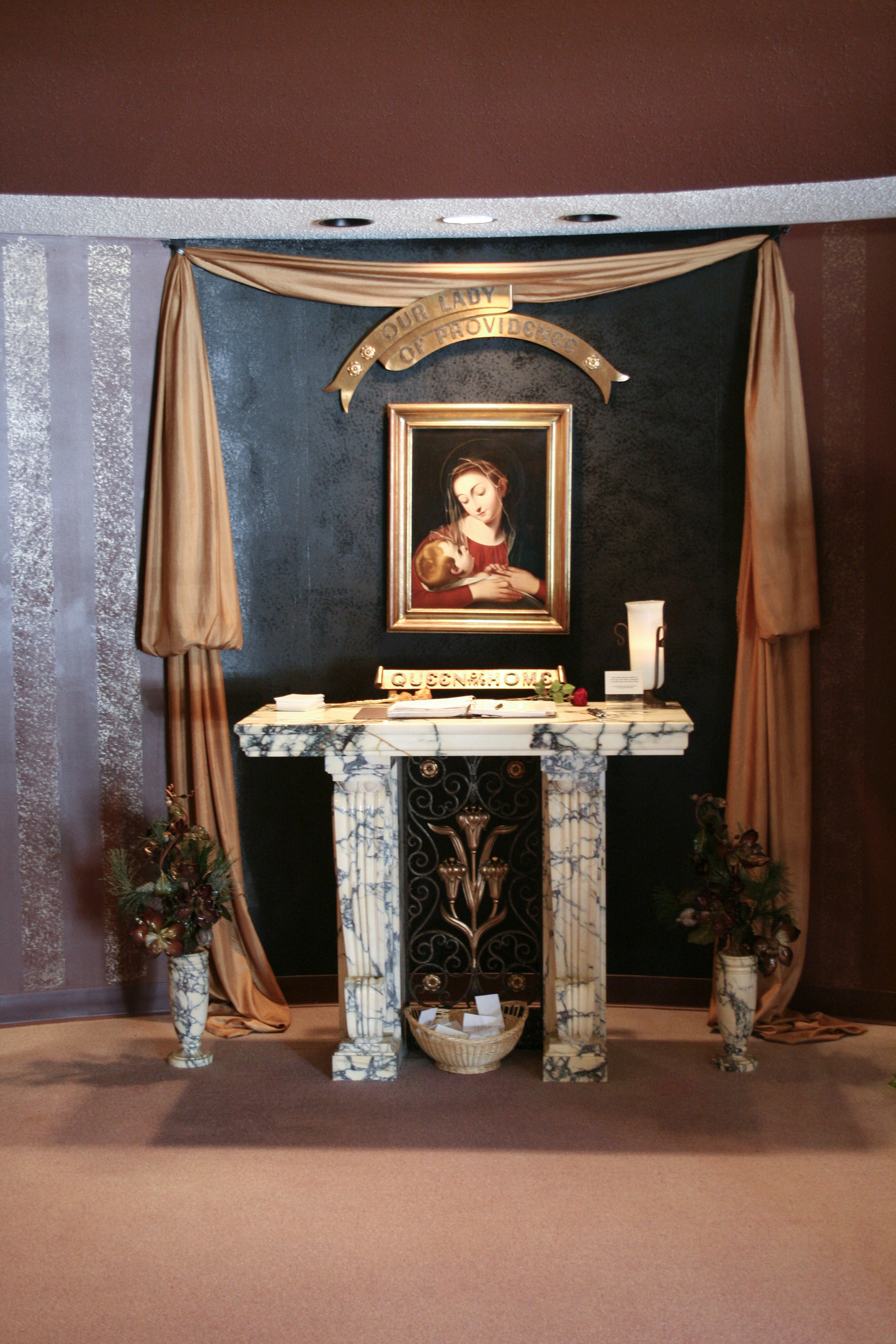
The National Shrine of Our Lady of Providence, Saint Mary-of-the-Woods, Indiana

Devotion to Our Lady of Providence came to the United States after a chaplain of the Sisters of Providence of Saint Mary-of-the-Woods, Indiana, Monsignor A.J. Rawlinson, saw a reproduction of "Mater Divinae Providentiae" at Catholic University of America. During a trip to Rome in 1925, Rawlinson gathered historical information on the devotion to Our Lady of Providence and then brought back prints of the painting to Saint Mary-of-the-Woods, Indiana.

On May 1, 1925, the National Shrine of Our Lady of Providence was canonically erected at Saint Mary-of-the-Woods with the purpose of encouraging families to make Mary the queen of their homes. A confraternity of Our Lady of Providence was erected, and later a certificate of affiliation of the American confraternity was established with the archconfraternity in Rome.

The hymn Our Lady of Providence'' by Sr. Cecilia Clare Bocard, is sung by the sisters at various special celebrations.

== Puerto Rico National Sanctuary of Our Lady of Providence ==
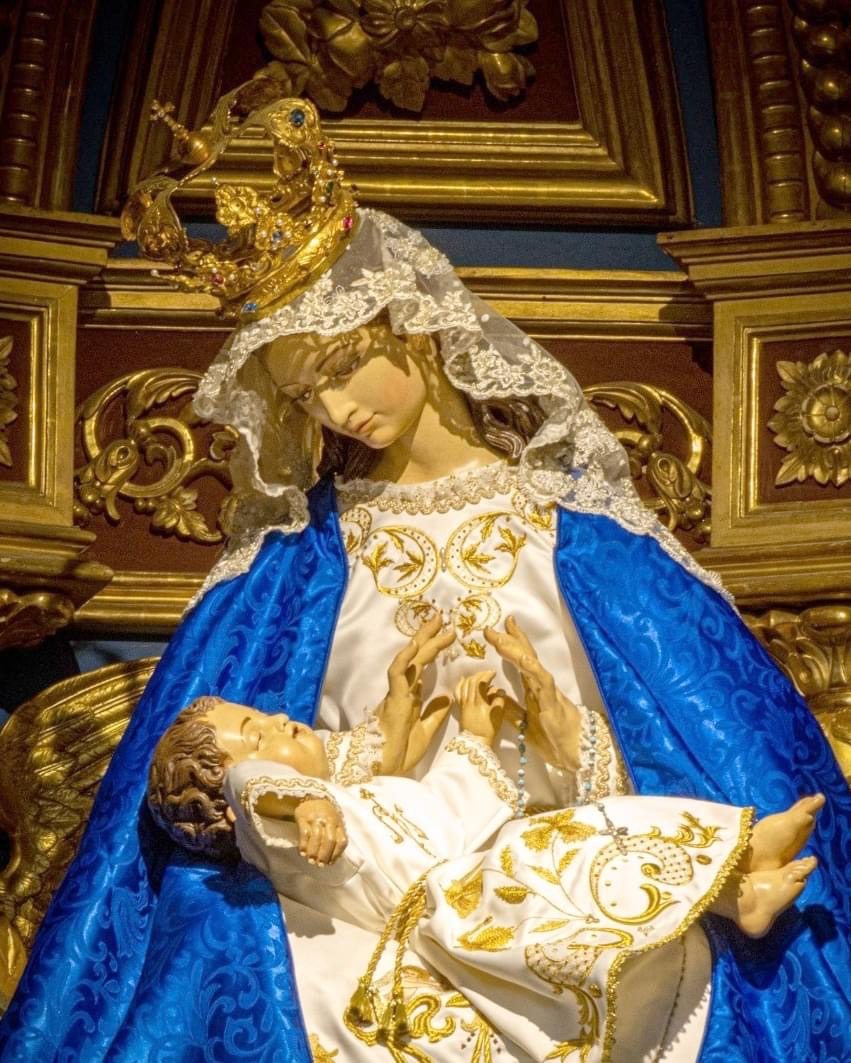
Image of Our Lady of Providence (patron saint of Puerto Rico) in Cathedral of San Juan, Puerto Rico

The National Sanctuary of Our Lady of Providence (Santuario Nacional de Nuestra Señora Madre de la Divina Providencia) is a pilgrimage center in San Juan, Puerto Rico. The center aims to empower and educate members of the Roman Catholic faith. The site regularly hosts religious and cultural events for groups and families. Our Lady of Providence is patron saint of Puerto Rico.

On the first Saturday of every month, the center hosts an early risers (madrugadores) event in which the rosary is prayed and the sacraments of confession and eucharist are administered. Two weeks before Holy Week, the center prepares for its Lenten mission, which attracts around 10,000 pilgrims a year. Occasionally, a Night With Mary Under The Stars (Con María Bajo Las Estrellas) event is held.
