= Battle of San Juan (1797) =

Battle between the British and Spanish in Puerto Rico

- Part of the War of the First Coalition and the Anglo-Spanish War of 1796-1808
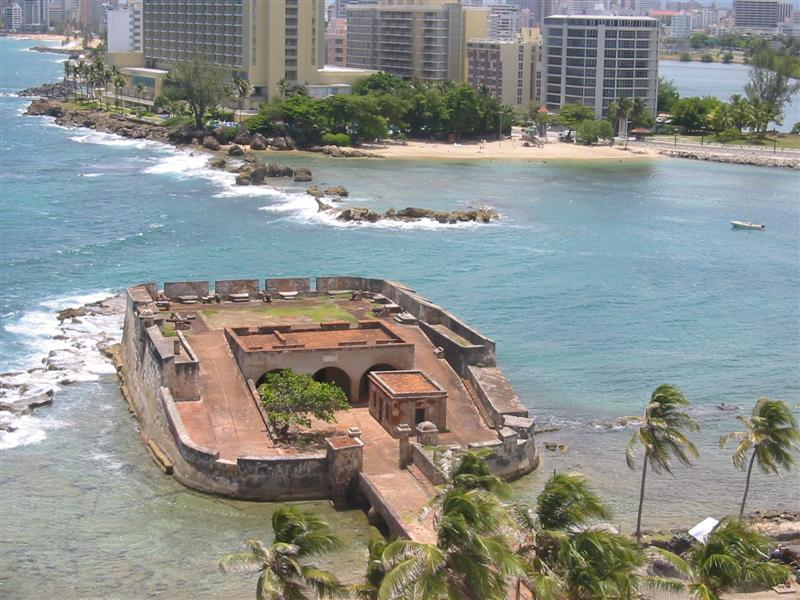
- The Fortín de San Gerónimo
Date	21 April – 30 April 1797
Location	San Juan, Puerto Rico
Result	Spanish victory

Belligerents
Great Britain	Spain

Commanders and leaders
(Kingdom of Great Britain) Ralph Abercromby; (Kingdom of Great Britain) Henry Harvey	(Spain) Ramón de Castro; (Spain) Francisco Díaz †

Strength
7,000; 68 warships with 600 guns	6,000–7,000; 376 guns and 12 gunboats

Casualties and losses
200 killed; 290 captured, incl. deserters; Total: 490	42 killed; 156 wounded/injured; 3 captured/missing; Total: 201

The Battle of San Juan (21 April – 30 April) occurred within an ill-fated British operation in 1797 targeting the Spanish colonial port city of San Juan in Puerto Rico during the 1796–1808 Anglo-Spanish War. The operation was carried out facing the historic town of Miramar. The battle was actually a series of successive Spanish attacks on the British siege positions; these Spanish countermeasures broke the British force and the siege of San Juan by it.

== Background ==
Spain aligned itself with France by signing the Second Treaty of San Ildefonso in 1796. Britain then targeted both countries' Caribbean colonies. Admiral Sir Henry Harvey's fleet picked up Sir Ralph Abercromby's army in Barbados. Together, they captured Trinidad from the Spanish, before heading for San Juan.

== Prelude to battle ==
On 17 April 1797, Lieutenant-General Sir Ralph Abercromby's fleet of 68 vessels appeared offshore Puerto Rico with a force of 7,000, which included German auxiliaries and French émigrés. Two of his frigates then blocked San Juan harbor.

The governor, Field Marshal Don Ramón de Castro y Gutiérrez, had already mobilized his 4,000 militia and 200 Spanish regular garrison troops which, combined with 300 French privateers, 2,000 armed peasantry, and paroled prisoners, brought his troop strength up to almost equal that of the British. He also had 376 cannon, 35 mortars, 4 howitzers and 3 swivel guns.

Abercromby landed 3,000 troops on 18 April and took control of Cangrejos. Castro moved his forces to Escambrón and the Spanish First Line of Defense.

== Battle ==
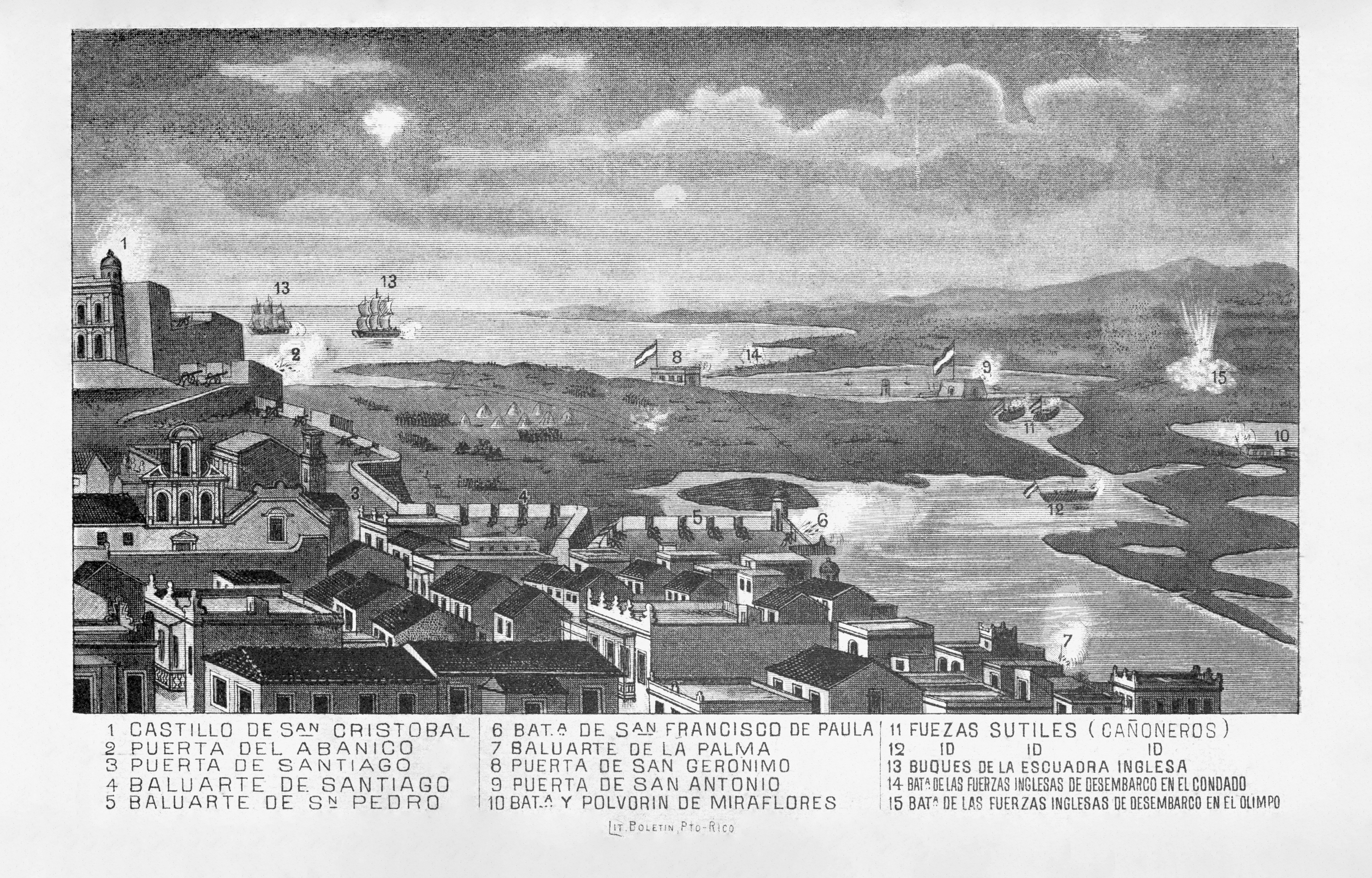
Print showing the battlefield.

On 21 April, the British started a 7-day artillery duel with the Spanish forts of San Gerónimo and San Antonio, located at the Boquerón Inlet. At the same time, further Spanish forces put pressure on the British positions; the Spanish recaptured Martín Peña Bridge, while the militia led by José "Pepe" Díaz (1776 – April 30, 1797) and Sergeant Francisco Díaz (1777 – ?), both cousins, raided behind British lines, bringing back prisoners. Then, on the 29th and 30th, the Spanish under Ramón de Castro crossed the Boquerón Inlet while numbering around 800 militia and two troops of cavalry, and forced the British to pull back.

== Aftermath ==
On 1 May, the Spanish learned the British were gone, leaving behind arms, stores and ammunition. Another source, covering an incomplete picture of the military actions, reports that the British "sailed away by May 2 after losing 31 killed, 70 wounded and 124 captured or missing." In all, the British lost around 200 killed and about 290 captured including deserters.

== Bibliography ==
- Alonso, Mariá M. and Milagros Flores (1997). The Eighteenth Century Caribbean and the British Attack on Puerto Rico in 1797. San Juan: National Park Service, Department of the Interior, Publicaciones Puertorriqueñas. ISBN 978-1-881713-20-3
- Marley, David (1998). Wars of the Americas: a chronology of armed conflict in the New World, 1492 to the present. ABC-CLIO. ISBN 978-0-87436-837-6
