= Francisco Torralbo =

Spanish governor of Puerto Rico

Francisco Torralbo y Robles

85 and 87th Governor of Puerto Rico
- Interim
- In office 27 March – 8 July 1789
- Monarch: Charles III
- First Secretary of State: Count of Floridablanca
- Secretary of State for Indies: Marquess of Sonora; Count of Floridablanca (as interim)
- Viceroy of New Spain: Alonso Núñez de Haro y Peralta
- Preceded by: Juan Andrés Daban y Busterino
- Succeeded by: Miguel Antonio de Ustáriz
- Interim
- In office 19 May 1792 – 10 March 1793
- Monarch: Charles IV
- First Secretary of State: Count of Aranda (as interim); Manuel Godoy
- Viceroy of New Spain: Juan Vicente de Güemes Padilla Horcasitas
- Preceded by: Miguel Antonio de Ustáriz
- Succeeded by: Enrique Grimarest

Personal details
- Born: c. 1740 Catalonia, Spain
- Died: May 15, 1795 Puerto Rico
- Spouse: Teresa Valenciano y Pimentel
- Profession: Brigadier General, Governor-General of Puerto Rico

Francisco Torralbo y Robles (1730 – May 15, 1795), acting governor of Puerto Rico, brigadier general, King's Lieutenant of Puerto Rico.

== Biography ==
Colonel Francisco Torralbo was born in the Principality of Catalonia. He was the legitimate son of Alfonso (Alonso) Torralbo, infantry captain in the Regiment of Murcia, and Apolonia Robles, he entered into marriage with Teresa Valenciano y Pimentel in 1763 and had issue, among whom Juana Josefa de la Luz de Torralbo y Valenciano, who in turn married Colonel Rafael Conti y Flores, defender of Aguadilla against a British invasion in 1797.

He served as Spanish governor of Puerto Rico on two occasions, 1789 and 1792–1793, both ad interim. The first occasion occurred after governor Juan Dabán y Busterino was recalled to Spain; the second was similarly a consequence of governor Miguel Antonio de Ustariz's return to the Peninsula following his physical indisposition, a permanent replacement would be, in effect, Field Marshal Ramón de Castro, owing to the sudden death in Mexico of the Crown's original choice, Brigadier General Enrique de Grimarest, which occurred after his appointment but before he could assume the post. During his interimships Torralbo dealt with the consequences of the ongoing French Revolution, especially through its manifestations on the neighboring French colonies of Saint Domingue and Martinique. After retiring Torralbo spent the remainder of his life in Puerto Rico and was buried in the Chapel of San Vicente Ferrer of the Convent of the Predicators in San Juan.
