= Museum of San Juan =

Municipal museum in Puerto Rico

- Plaza del Mercado de San Juan
- U.S. Historic district – Contributing property
- U.S. National Historic Landmark District – Contributing property
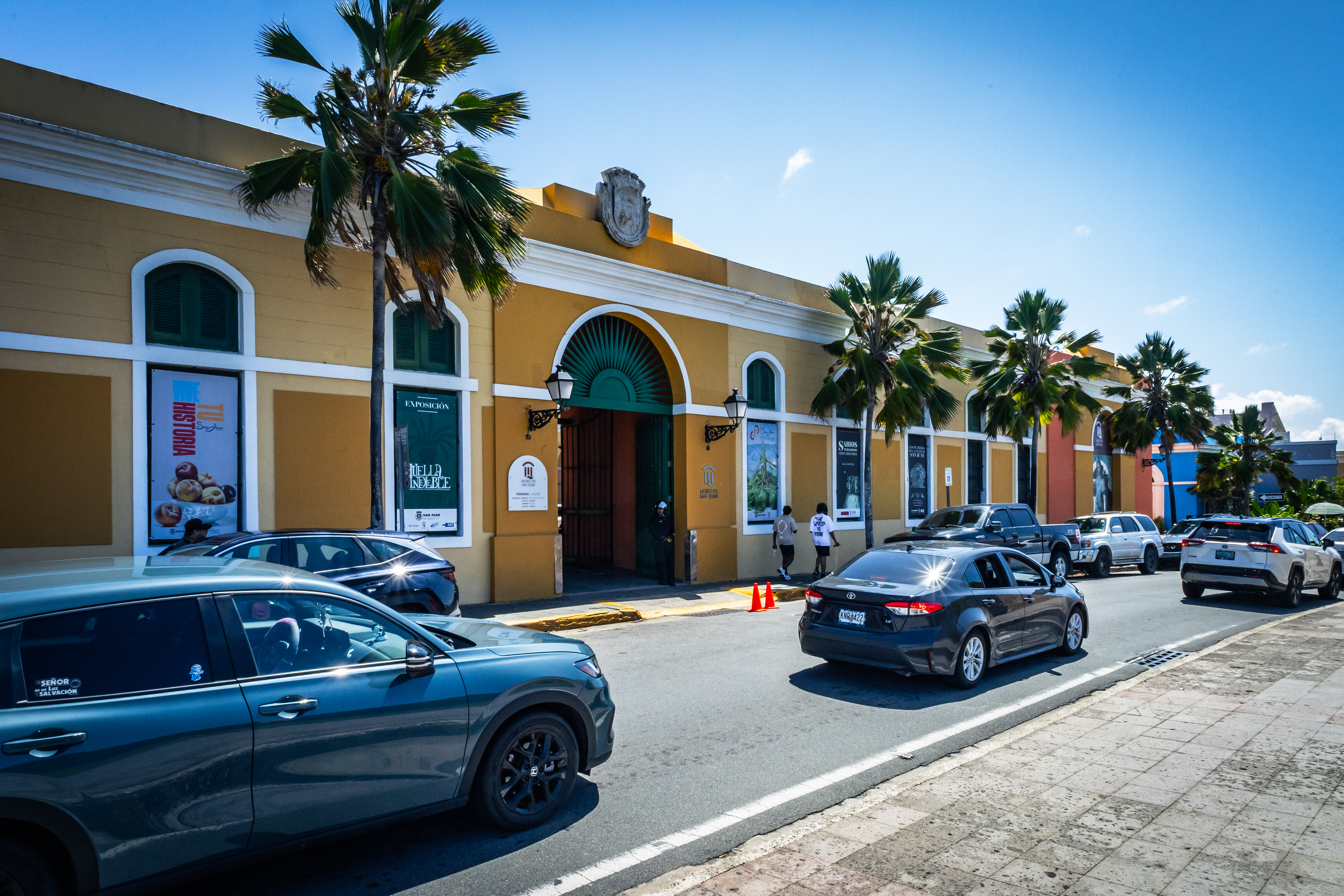
- Location: San Juan Antiguo, San Juan, Puerto Rico
- Coordinates: 18.46799°N 66.11746°W
- Built: 19th century
- Architectural style: Neoclassical and Spanish Colonial
- Restored: 1979, 1993
- Part of: Old San Juan Historic District (ID72001553 & ID13000284)

Significant dates
- Designated CP: October 10, 1972
- Designated NHLDCP: February 27, 2013

Museum of San Juan (Spanish: Museo de San Juan), originally founded as the Municipal Museum of Art and History of San Juan (Museo Municipal de Arte e Historia de San Juan), is a multidisciplinary museum located in the former 19th-century marketplace hall of Old San Juan, in the Mercado subbarrio of the city of San Juan, Puerto Rico. The museum, founded in 1979, was the first municipal museum to be established in Puerto Rico. In addition to its main museum campus, the institution also holds a temporary art gallery at the San Juan City Hall.

In addition to cultural event spaces, the museum currently holds two exhibition areas: one dedicated to contemporary local artists and another dedicated to the history of the city of San Juan as showcased by relics and artifacts from the Cathedral of San Juan treasuries, works of art by Puerto Rican masters such as José Campeche, and historic visual prints dating from periods ranging from the 17th to the 19th centuries.

== Gallery ==
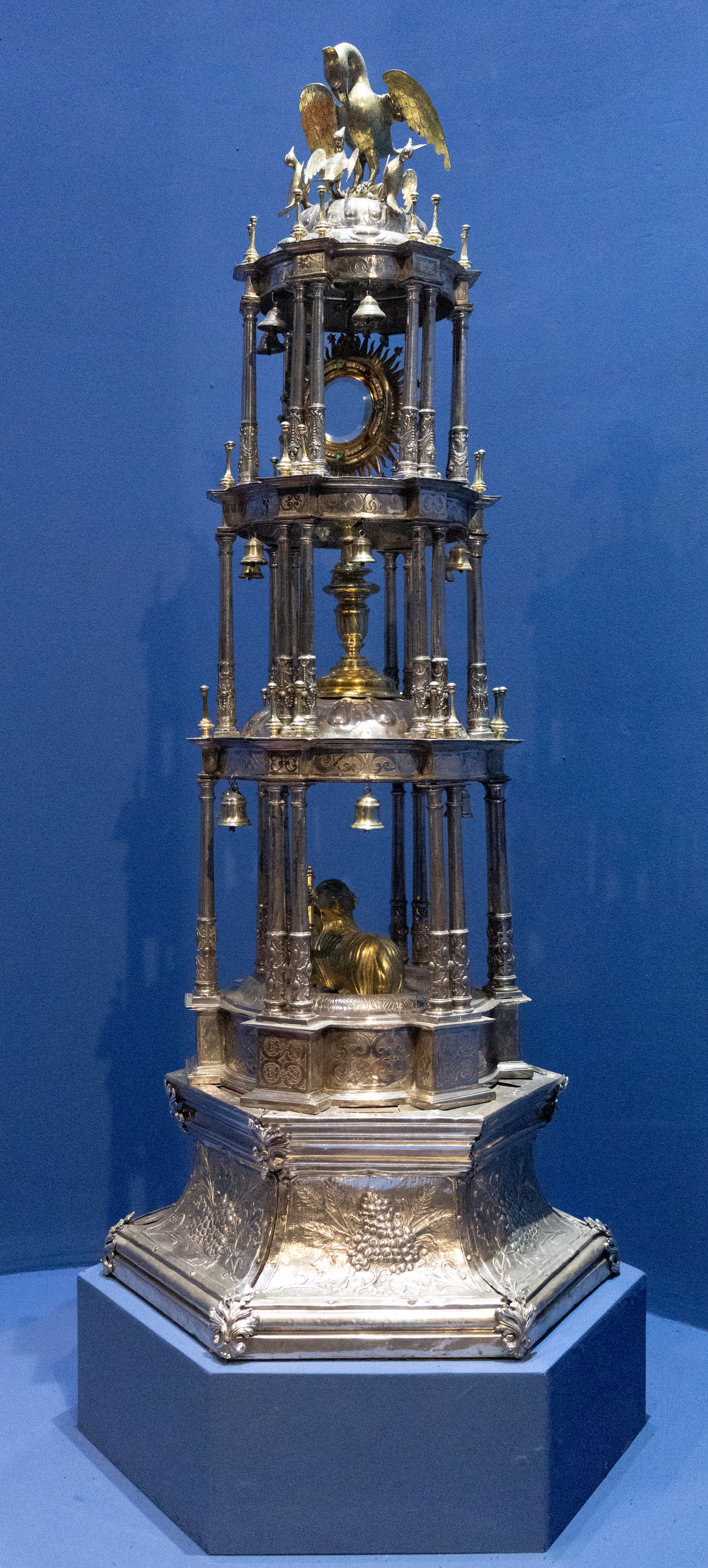
17th-century silver monstrance.

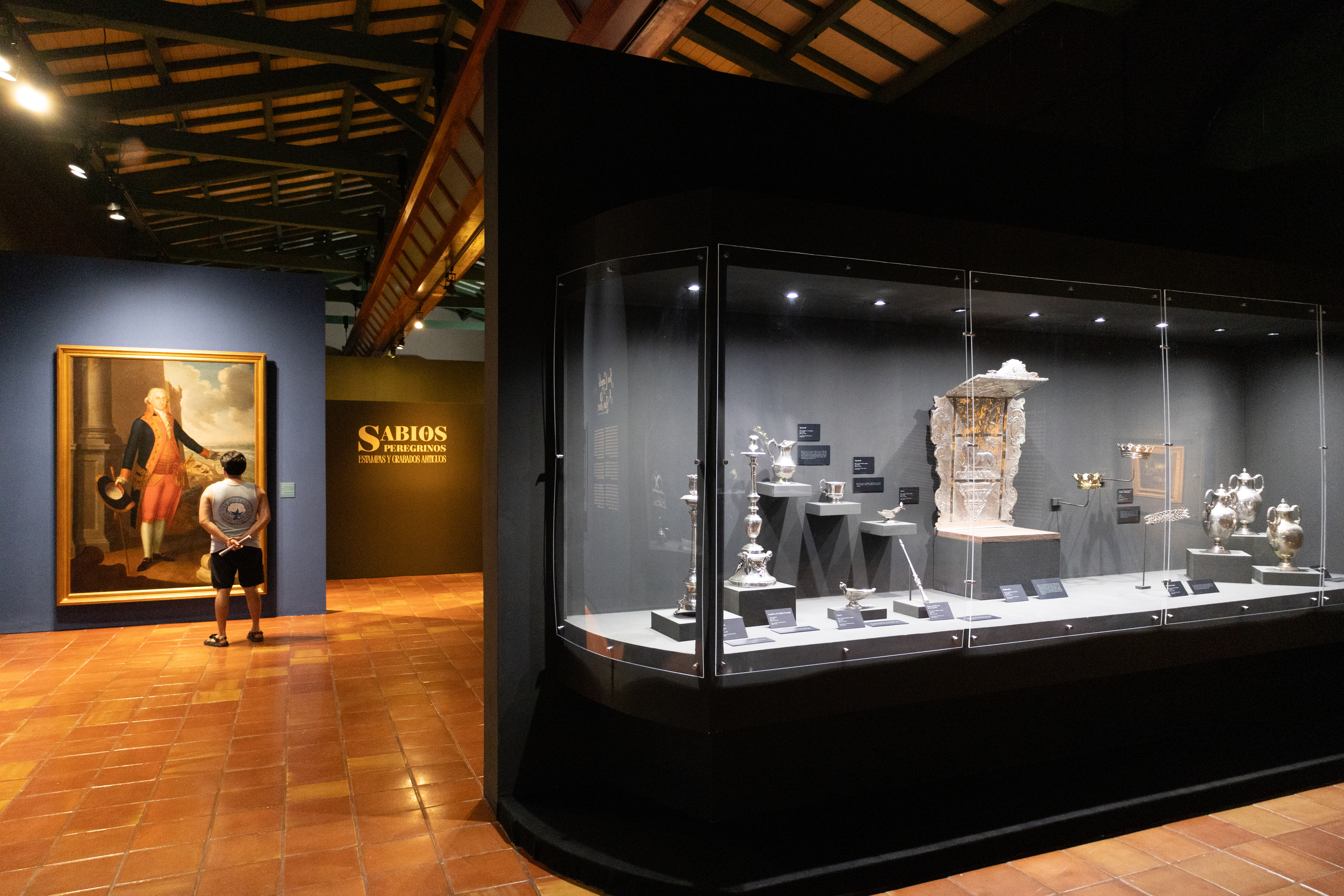
Cathedral treasury exhibition.

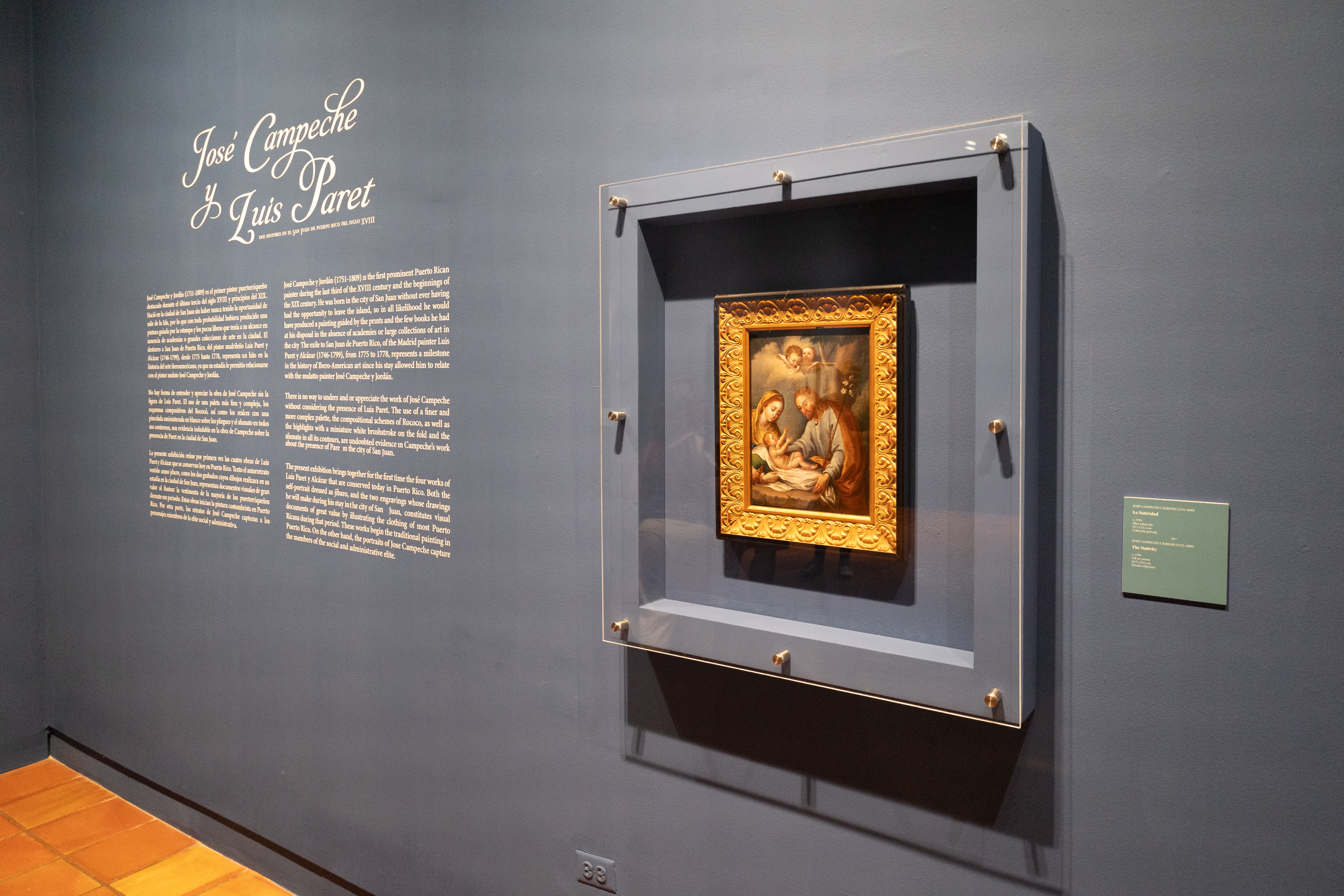
José Campeche and Luis Paret exhibition.

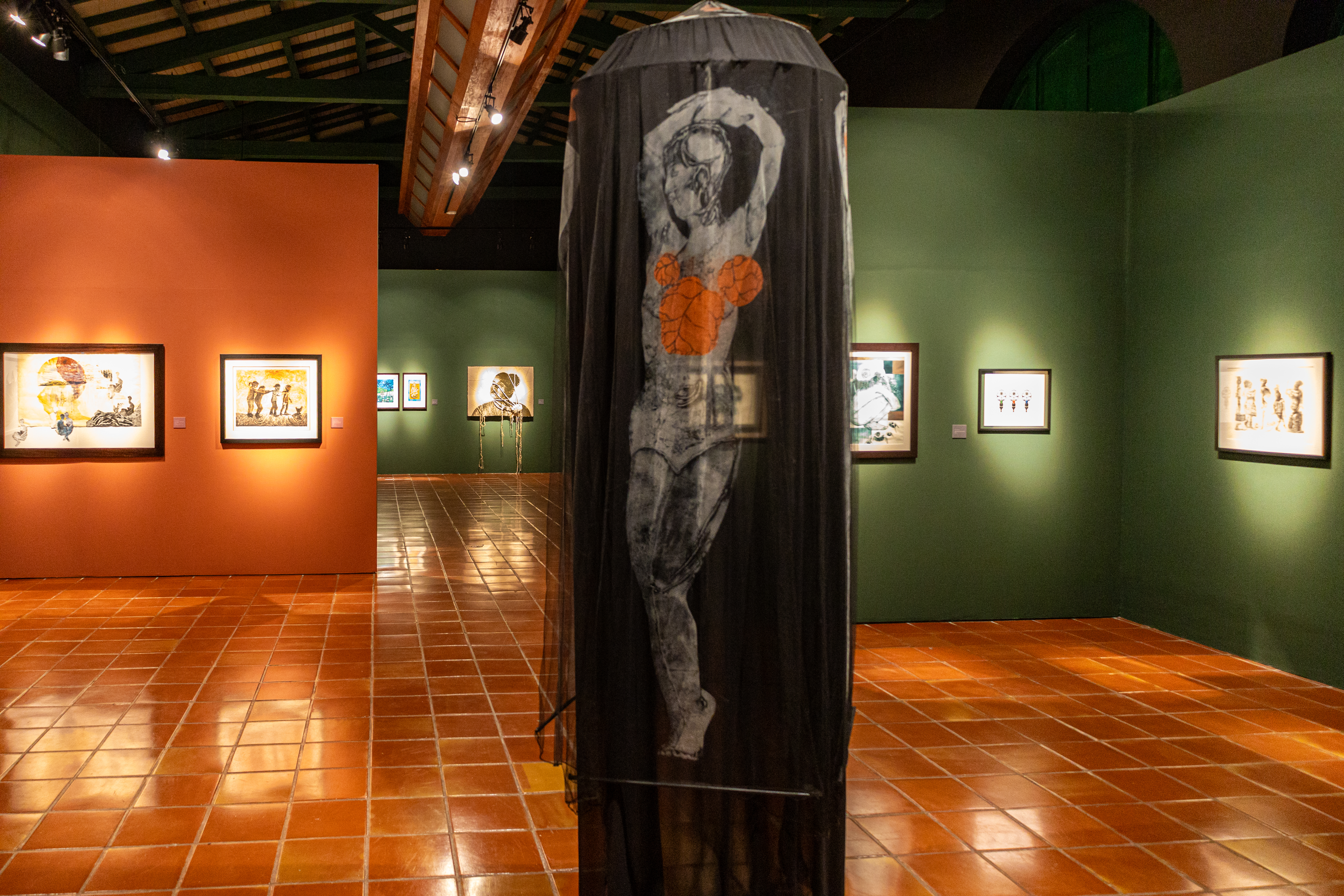
Contemporary art exhibition.
