= Cathedral of San Juan, Puerto Rico =

Church in Puerto Rico

Metropolitan Cathedral-Basilica of Saint John the Baptist Catedral Metropolitana Basílica de San Juan Bautista
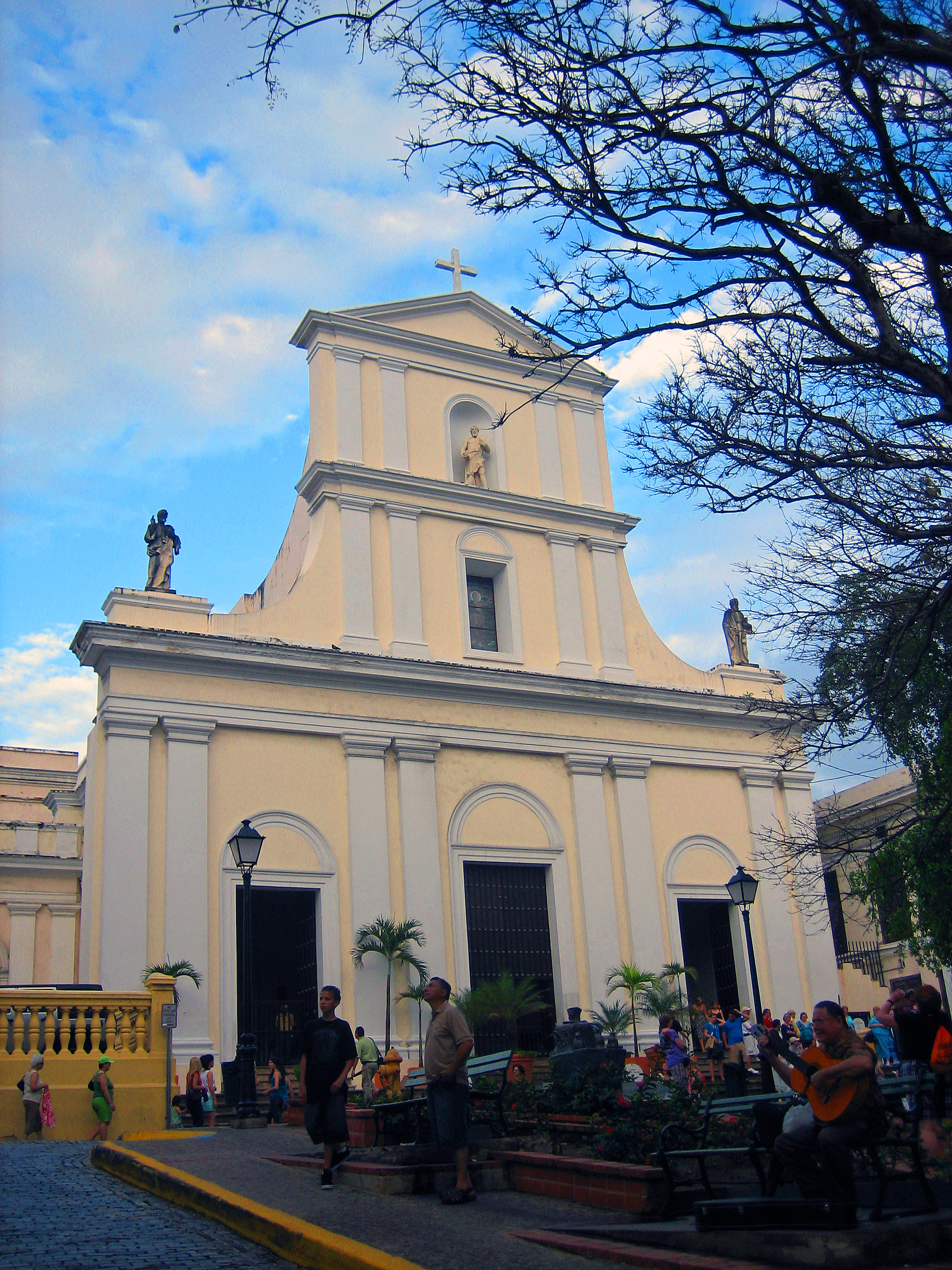
- Front entrance

- Location of San Juan and the cathedral in Puerto Rico
- 18°27′57″N 66°7′4″W
- Location: San Juan, Puerto Rico
- Denomination: Roman Catholic

History
- Status: Cathedral
- Founded: 1521

Architecture
- Style: Baroque
- Groundbreaking: 1535
- Completed: 1802

Administration
- Diocese: Archdiocese of San Juan de Puerto Rico

Clergy
- Archbishop: Eusebio Ramos Morales
- San Juan Bautista Metropolitan Cathedral
- U.S. National Historic Landmark District – Contributing property
- Part of: Old San Juan Historic District (ID72001553)
- Designated NHLDCP: October 10, 1972

The Metropolitan Cathedral Basilica of Saint John the Baptist (Spanish: Catedral Basílica Metropolitana de San Juan Bautista), officially known as the Minor Basilica of Saint John the Baptist and Parish of Our Lady of Remedies (Basilica Menor de San Juan Bautista y Parroquia Nuestra Señora de los Remedios), is the Catholic cathedral for the Archdiocese of San Juan de Puerto Rico. Located in the Old San Juan historic district of San Juan, Puerto Rico, it is one of the oldest buildings in both Puerto Rico and the Americas, the oldest purpose-built cathedral building and second-oldest existing cathedral in the Americas, and the third cathedral to be constructed in the Americas.

The cathedral contains the tomb of the Spanish explorer and settlement founder Juan Ponce de León. It also contains the national shrine to Our Lady of Divine Providence, national patron of Puerto Rico, and a shrine dedicated to the Blessed Carlos Manuel Rodríguez Santiago, the first Puerto Rican and first Caribbean-born layperson in history to be beatified.

== History ==
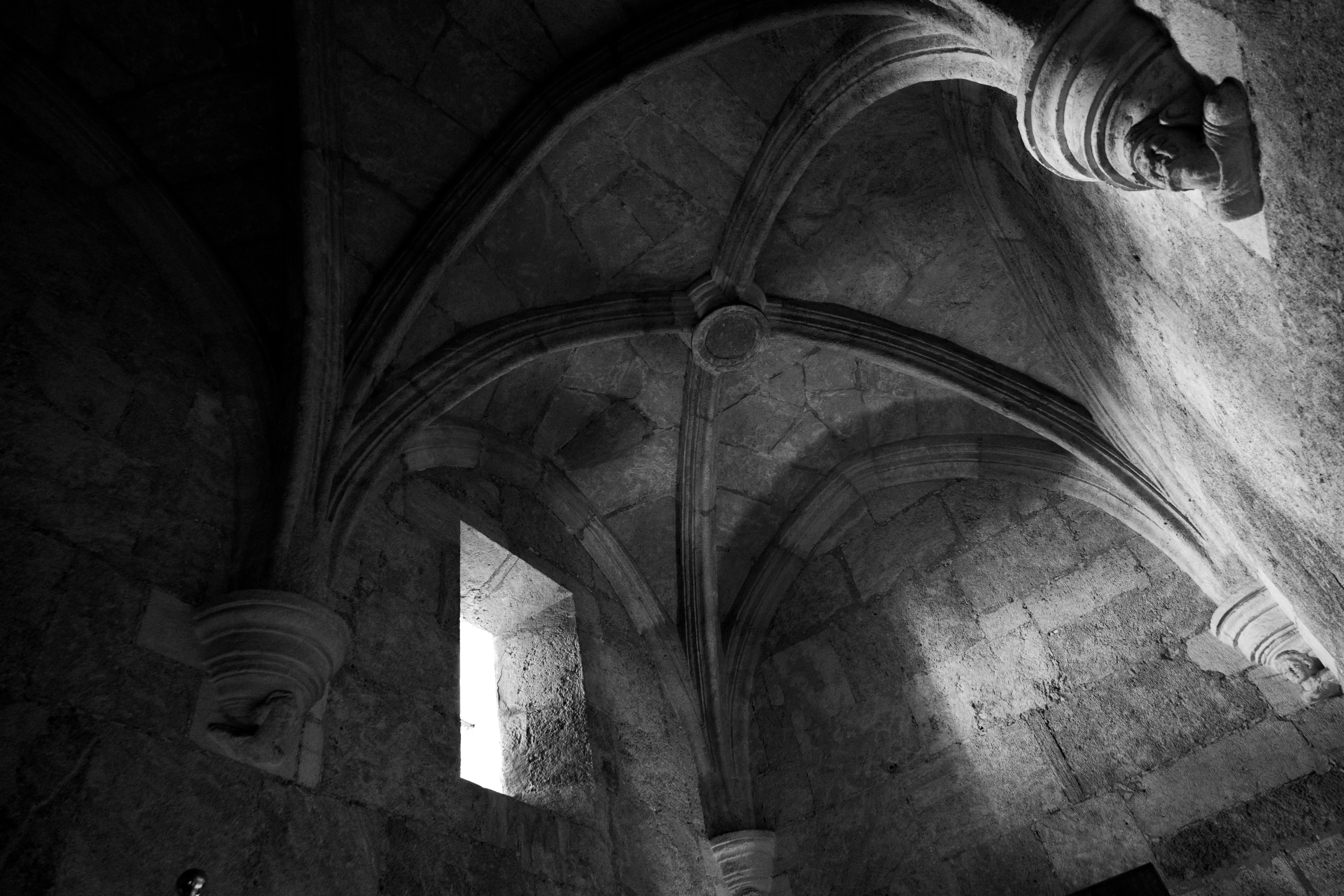
16th-century Gothic vault

Although the Cathedral of Santa María la Menor in Santo Domingo, Dominican Republic, is an older church building, and the Garðar Cathedral Ruins in Garðar, Greenland were built and served as a cathedral much earlier, the Cathedral of San Juan holds the distinction of being the oldest existing purpose-built cathedral church in the Americas. This is because San Juan, then known as the City of Puerto Rico, was the first diocese of the New World in the post-Columbus era (excluding Norse settlements in Greenland), with Bishop Don Alonso Manso appointed in 1511.

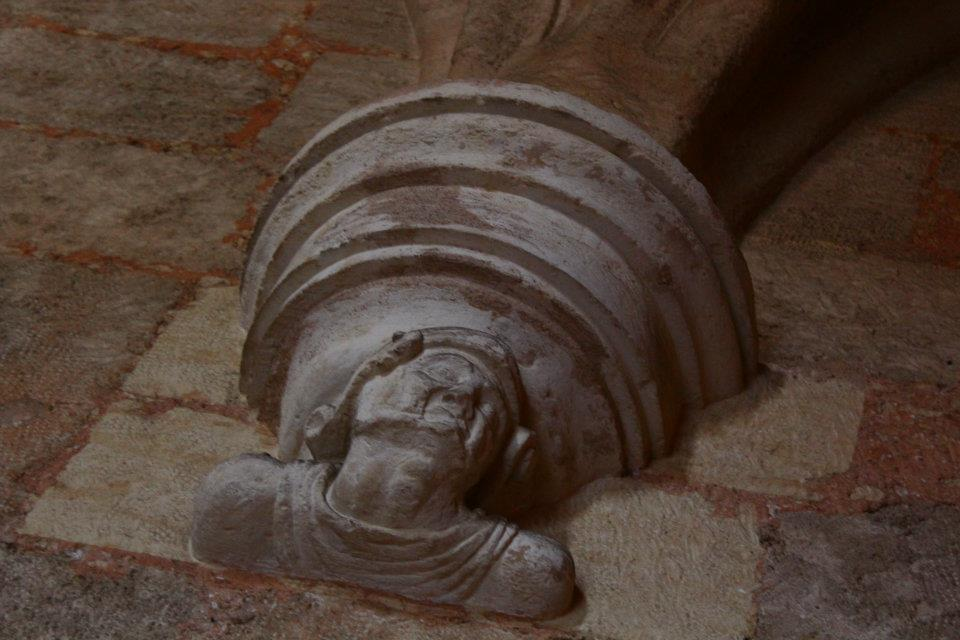
Gothic carved label stop

The original cathedral of the nascent Ciudad de Puerto Rico (formally established as Puerto Rico de San Juan Bautista in 1521) was constructed from wood from 1513, intended to become the seat of the First Catholic Diocese to be established in the Americas, founded earlier in 1511. That same year, the Escuela de gramática (Grammar School) was established by Bishop Alonso Manso, in the area where the modern cathedral would later be constructed. This was the first school to be established in the island of Puerto Rico. It was free of charge and the courses taught were Latin language, literature, history, science, art, philosophy and theology. The original wooden structure was destroyed by a hurricane in 1529, which prompted the construction of a stone building from 1535 to 1542.

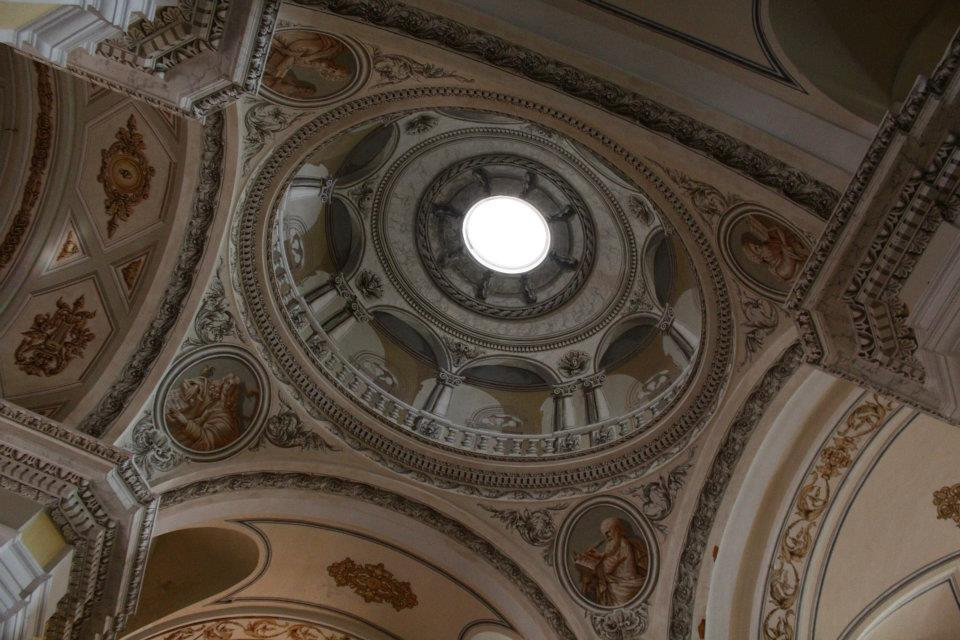
Baroque trompe-l'œil

The original cathedral structure completed in the second half of the 16th century was built in the Gothic style of architecture. This style can still be appreciated in several gothic vaults located in the northeast corner of the building. An earthquake in 1787 resulted in structural damages to the building which prompted a reconstruction of the cathedral in 1802 that resulted in its current Baroque style iteration. Another earthquake in 1867 prompted further modifications to the facade in 1905.

The first organist of the Cathedral of San Juan was the Canarian Domingo Crisanto Delgado Gómez who came from the island of Tenerife and managed to take this position in 1836, having been a composer in Cathedral Our Lady of Los Remedios of San Cristóbal de La Laguna in his native island.

Cardinal Luis Aponte Martínez, who was archbishop of San Juan from 1965 to 1999, petitioned the Holy See to designate the historic cathedral a basilica in the 1970s. The cathedral finally was proclaimed a minor basilica by Pope Paul VI on January 25, 1978. The cathedral was visited by Pope John Paul II in 1984 as part of his pastoral visits to Puerto Rico and the Dominican Republic that same year.

A private Puerto Rican foundation known as Fundación Protectora de la Catedral Metropolitana de San Juan, Inc. was established to fund the historical restoration of the building and its art treasures for its 500th anniversary in 2021, and to protect it for the coming centuries.

== Chapels and chambers ==
=== Chapel of the Blessed Sacrament ===
Also known as the Chapel of the Metropolitan Tabernacle (sagrario metropolitano), this chapel located on the southwestern corner of the cathedral building holds the metropolitan tabernacle and various works of art. Unlike other Latin American metropolitan cathedrals, such as those in Mexico City and Bogotá, this is located within the cathedral building itself.

=== Chapel of Our Lady of Guadalupe ===
Although it is primarily dedicated to the Virgin of Guadalupe, it also contains icons of the Christ Child, Jude the Apostle and Our Lady of Sorrows. It contains a faithful replica of the tilmàtli of Juan Diego, authorized and signed by Cardinal Norberto Rivera Carrera, Archbishop of Mexico from 1995 to 2017. It is surrounded by a gold and pearl frame and an inscription that reads: "Queen of Mexico and Empress of America."

=== Chapel of Our Lady of Divine Providence ===
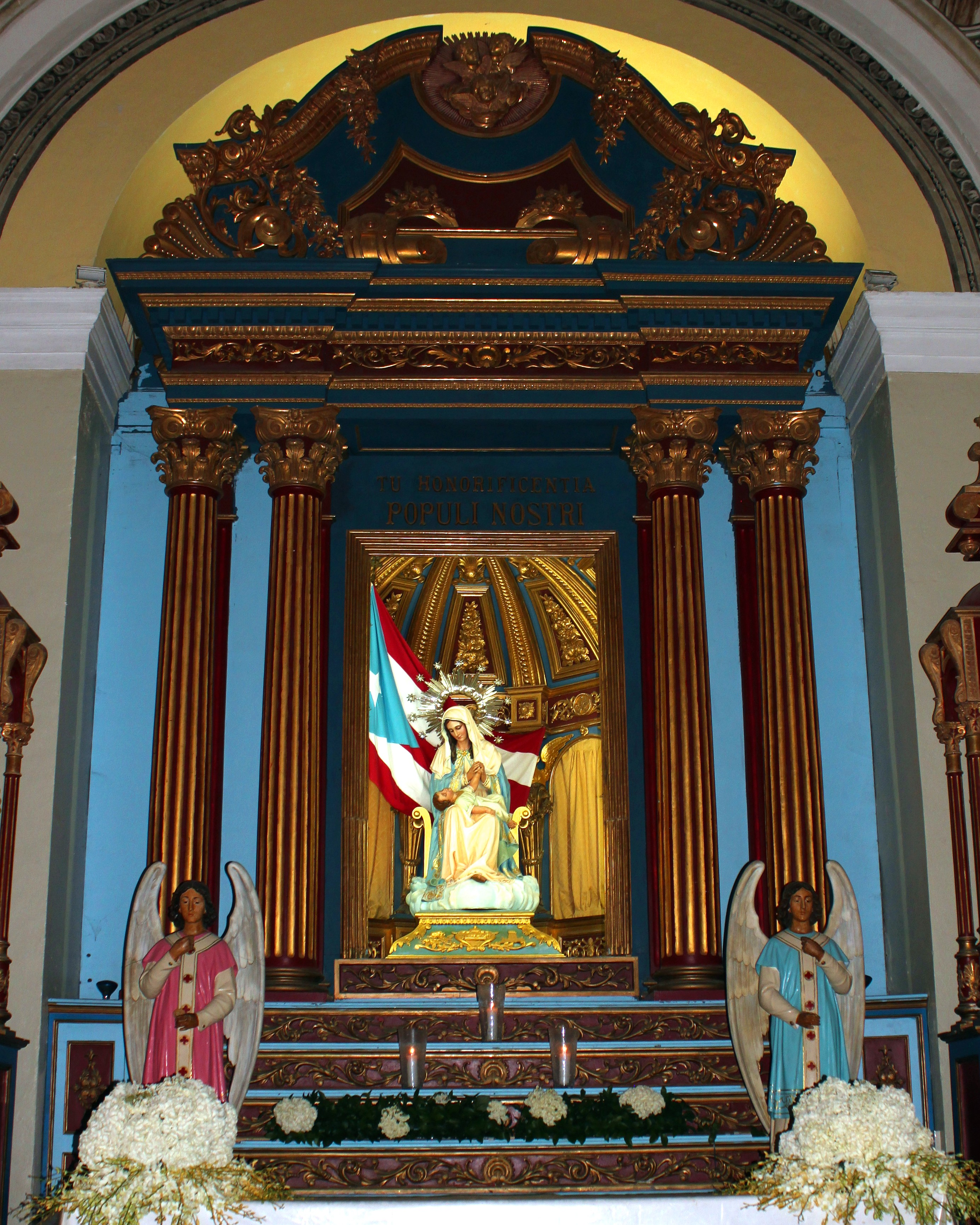
National Shrine of Our Lady of Providence

One of the most culturally important chapels of the cathedral, it contains a shrine that is dedicated the national image of Our Lady of Providence, patron and protector of Puerto Rico, together with the flag of Puerto Rico. The current statue dates to 1853. Next to it is an inscription that reads: Our Lady of Providence, Protector of Puerto Rico (1853-1953). Our Lady of Providence was declared national patron of Puerto Rico on November 19, 1969 by Pope Paul VI, on a decree that states the celebration of this Marian icon on November 19. This chapel is an officially declared national shrine that contains the icon of said national patron while the planned National Shrine of Our Lady Mother of Divine Providence (Santuario Nacional de Nuestra Señora Madre de la Divina Providencia) is being built in the Cupey barrio of San Juan, Puerto Rico.

=== Baptistery Chapel ===
The baptismal chapel or baptistery contains a wooden shrine with a portrait and personal relics of the Blessed Carlos Manuel Rodríguez Santiago, familiarly known as Blessed Charlie, the first Puerto Rican and first Caribbean-born layperson in to be beatified.

=== Chapel of Pius I ===
Located behind the sacristy, it contains the relics of Pope Pius I, the ninth pope of the Catholic Church. It also houses the vestments and ornaments worn by Pope John Paul II during his visit to Puerto Rico in 1984.

=== Burial Chapel of Juan Ponce de León ===
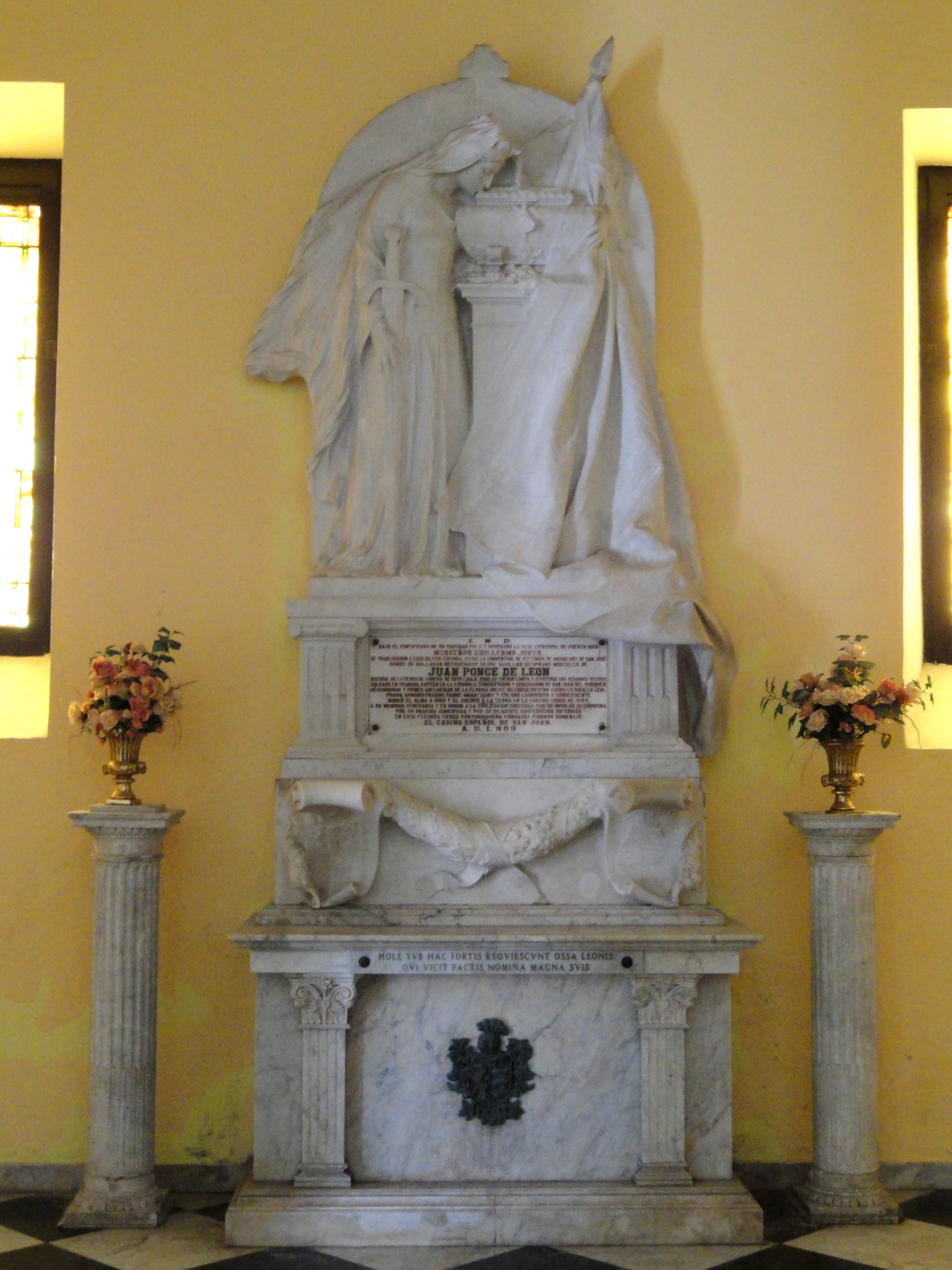
Tomb of Juan Ponce de León.

This chapel contains the mausoleum and tomb of the Spanish conquistador Juan Ponce de León, first colonial governor of Puerto Rico and the first European to arrive and settle the territory of Florida. This chapel also contains the tomb of Alonso Manso, the first bishop and founder of the Roman Catholic diocese of San Juan, and the tomb of Juan Alejo de Arizmendi, the first native-born Puerto Rican to become bishop.

=== Chapel of the Immaculate Conception ===
Located on the northwestern corner of the cathedral building, its main shrine has an icon of the Immaculate Conception of the Virgin Mary. The chapel also contains an image of Our Lady of Perpetual Help. Due to its position at the northern side of the main entrance to the cathedral, this chapel serves as a side portal.

=== Altar de la Patria ===
Consisting of a Gothic vault chamber located on the northeast corner of the nave, the oldest remaining portion of the cathedral building now contains the Altar to the Fatherland (Altar de la Patria), a monument and a plaque that commemorates the first use of the word puertorriqueño (Puerto Rican) as a demonym and marker of the birth of the Puerto Rican identity as cultural and spiritual identity separate from the Spanish one. The monument was established in 2011 in a ceremony preceded by archbishop Roberto González Nieves.

== Cathedral treasury ==
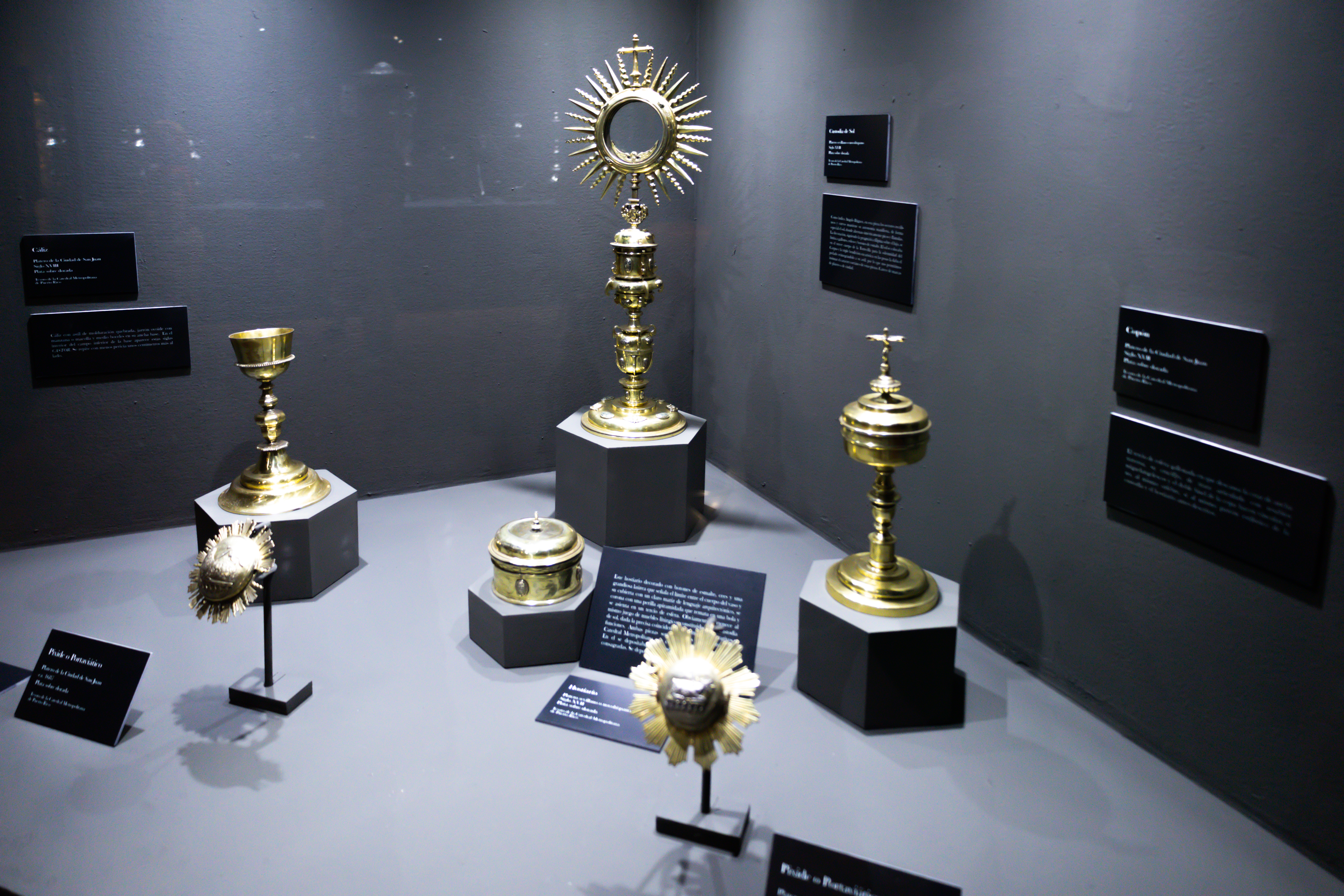
17th-century cathedral treasury silverware at the Museum of San Juan.

Being one of the oldest churches and religious institutions in the Americas, the cathedral holds a large and rich church treasury that showcases not only the history of the church but also the history of San Juan from its foundation in the 16th century to the present day. The treasury consists of sacred artifacts, relics and reliquaries, manuscripts and other important liturgical and other historical documents. The treasury today, particularly its historic religious silverware, is displayed as part of the art and history collection of the Museum of San Juan, which is located nearby in the Mercado subbarrio of Old San Juan.

== Gallery ==
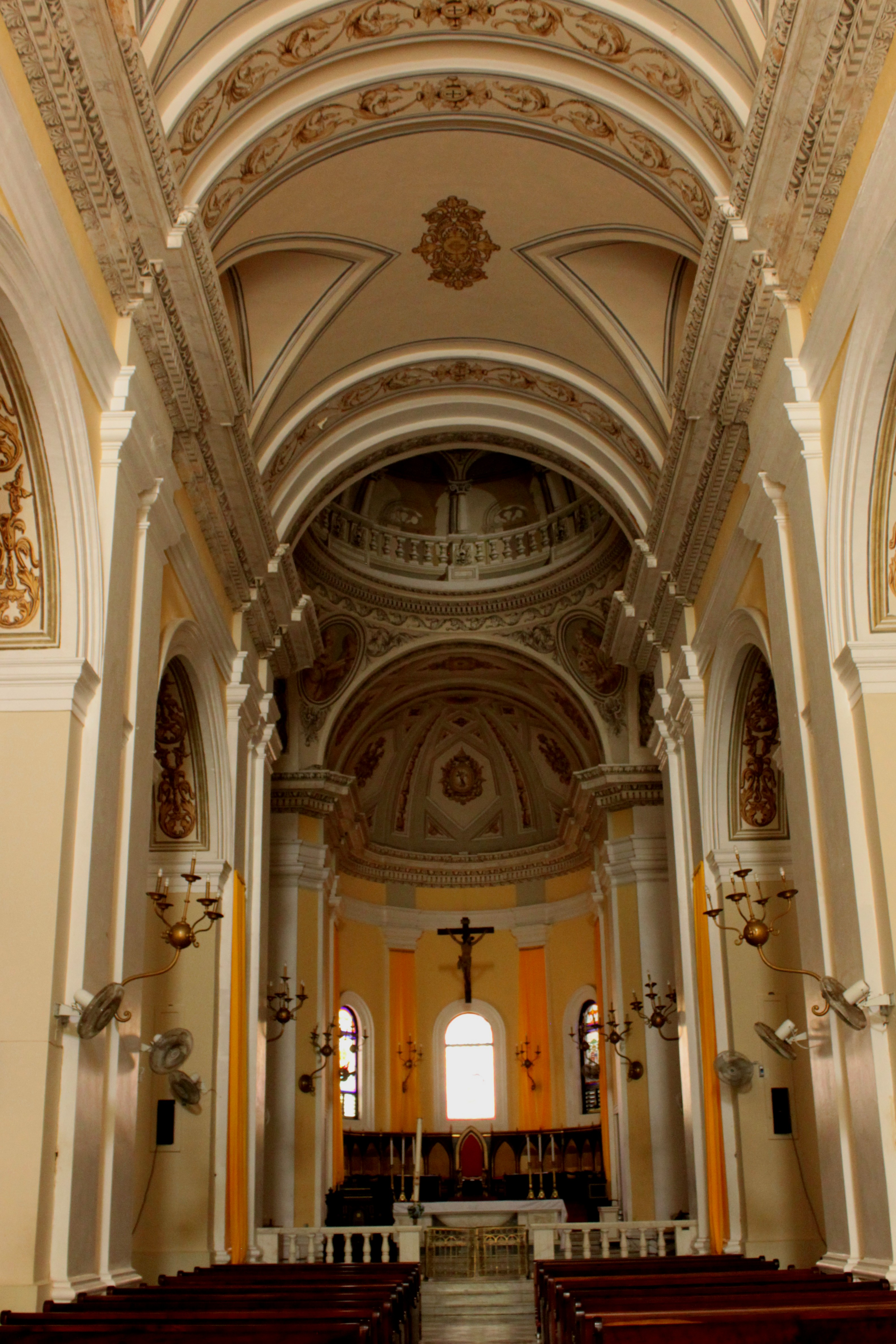
Inside the cathedral nave.

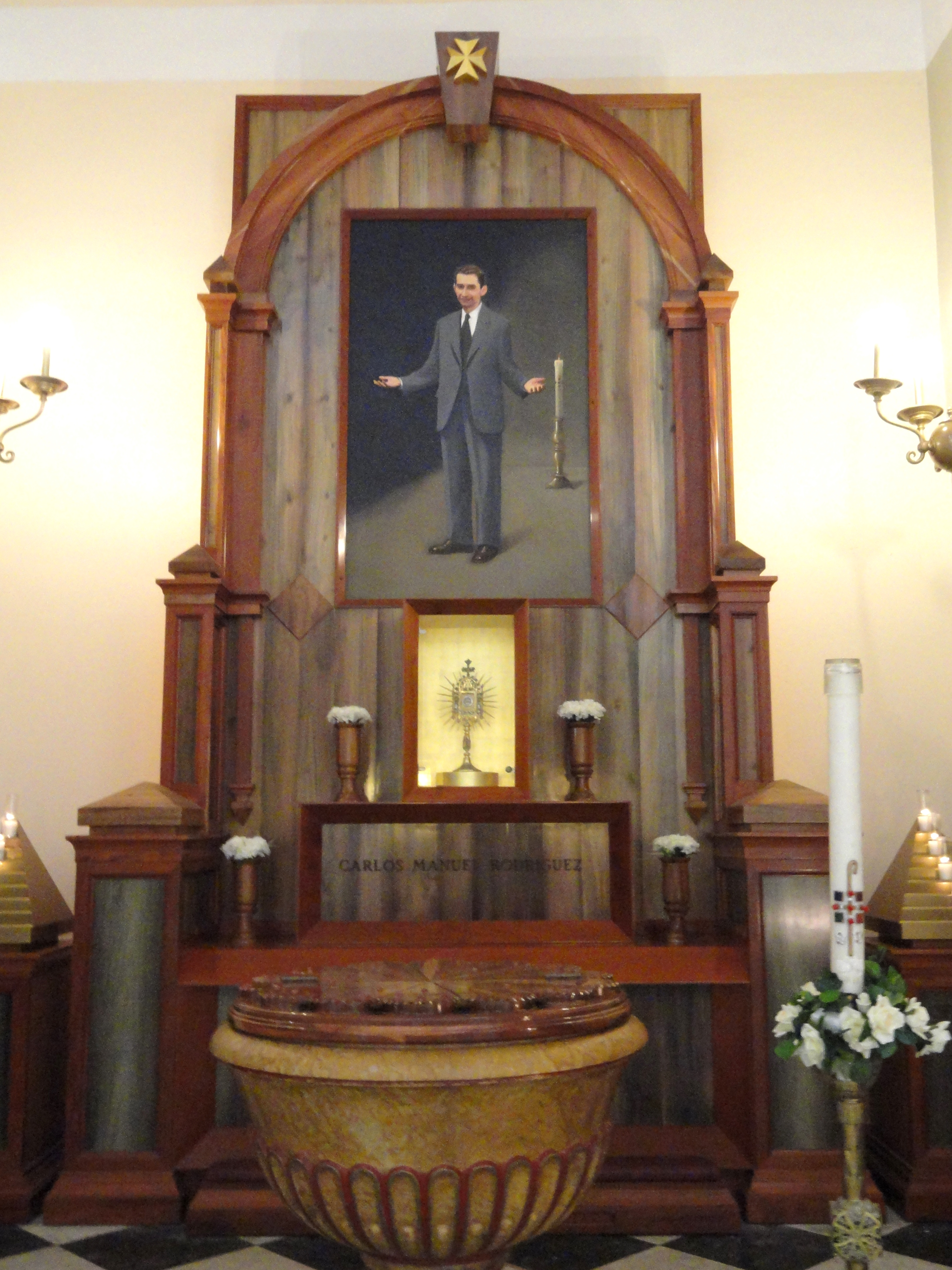
Shrine of Carlos Manuel Rodríguez Santiago.

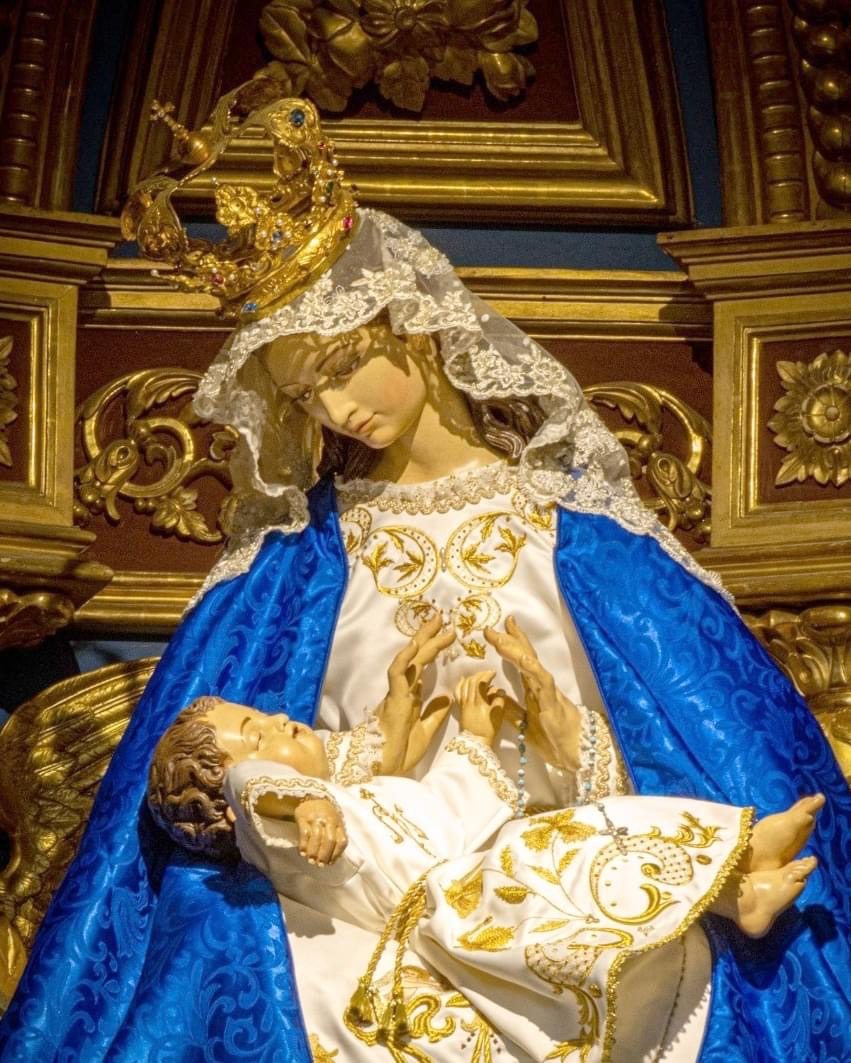
Close-up of Our Lady of Providence shrine.

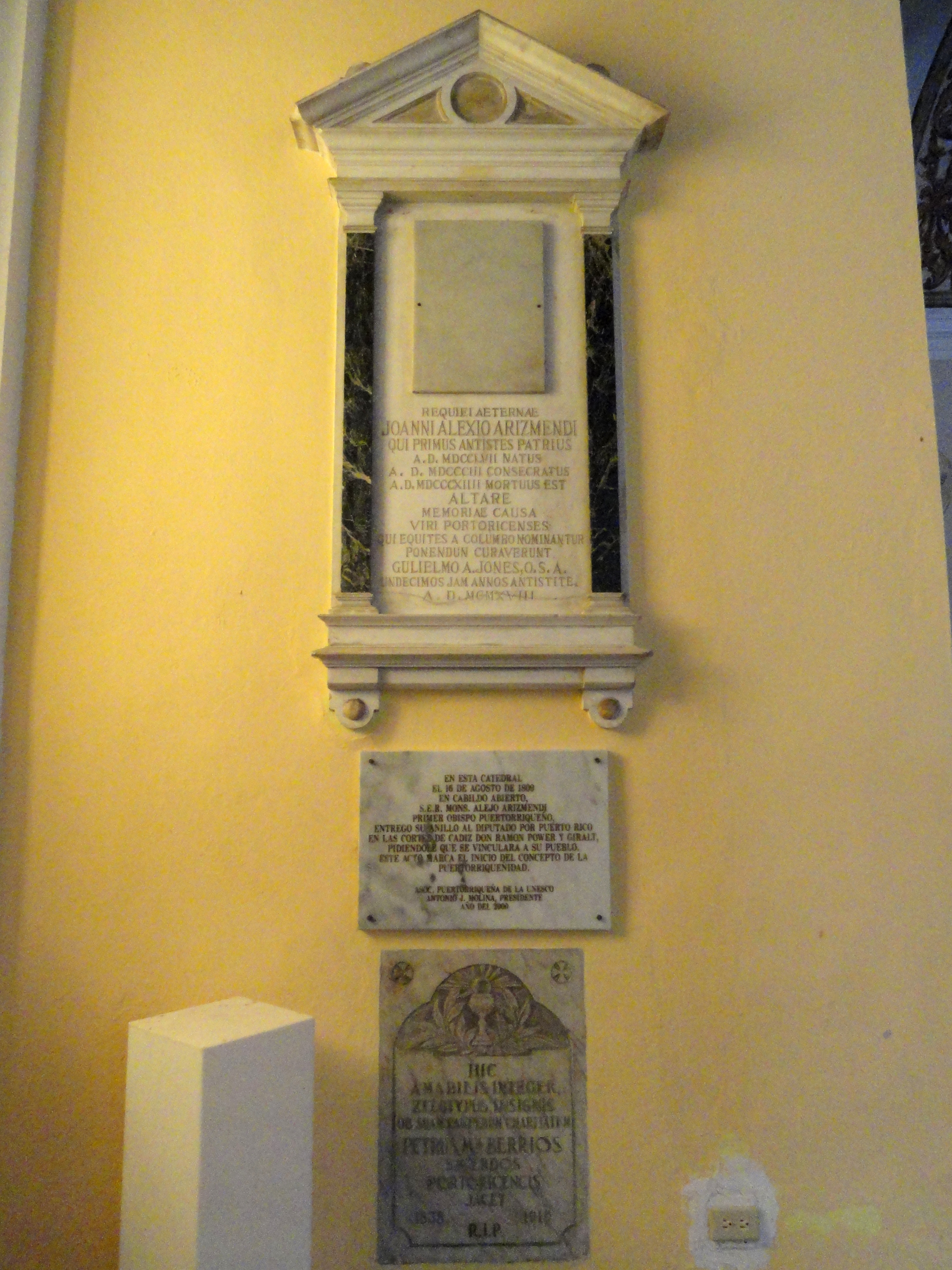
Tomb of Juan Alejo de Arizmendi.

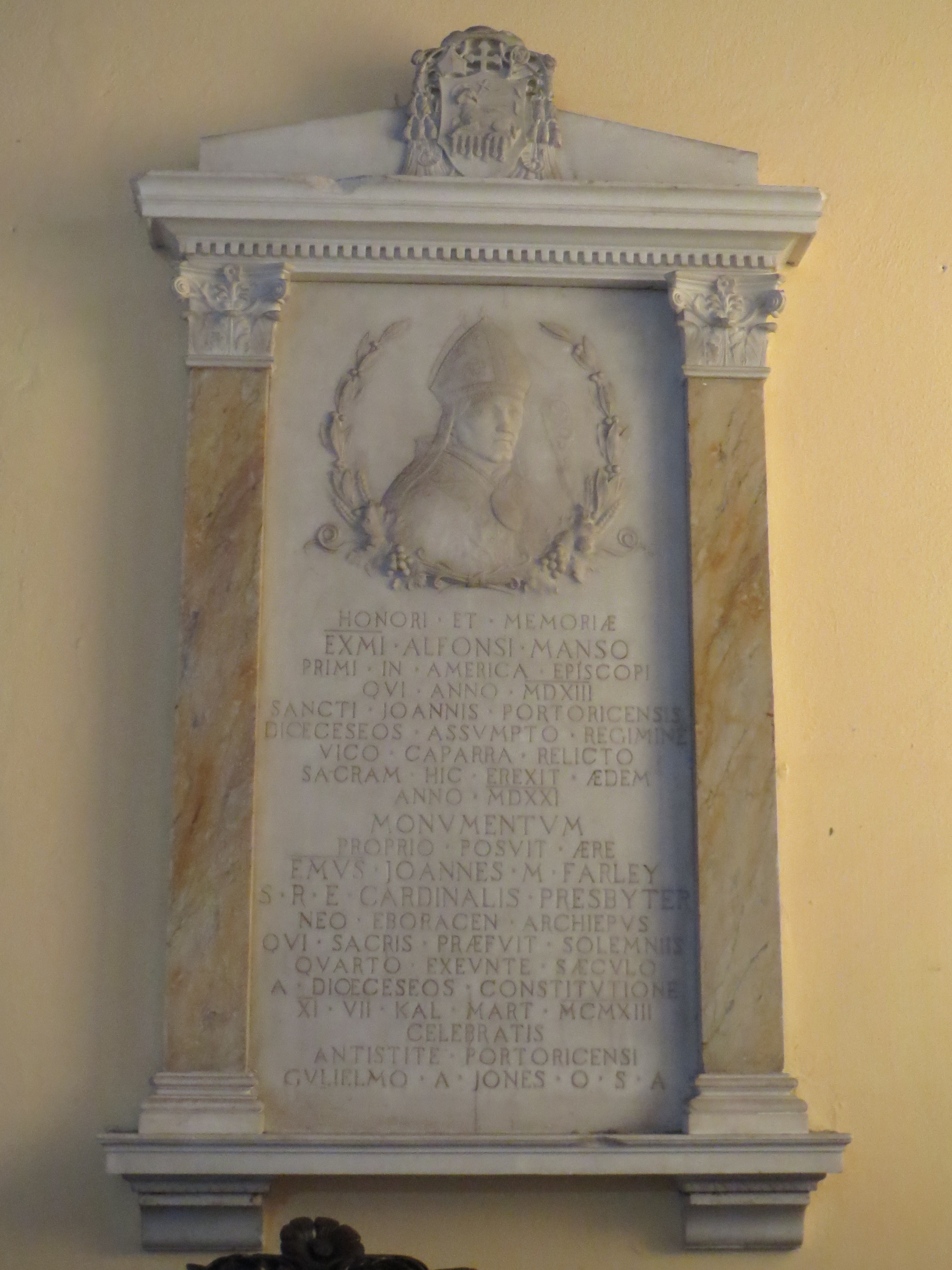
Tomb of Alonso Manso.

== See also ==
- List of the oldest buildings in Puerto Rico
- San José Church
- Capilla del Cristo
- Casa Blanca (San Juan)
