= Rafael Conti =

Spanish Army officer

Rafael Conti Flores
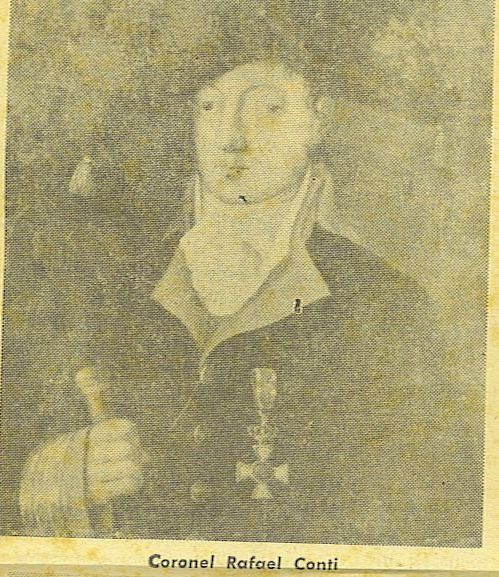
- In 1790, Col.Conti captured 11 enemy ships involved in smuggling stolen goods.
- Born: October 26, 1746; Cádiz, Andalusia, Spain
- Died: September 26, 1814 (aged 67); Mayagüez, Puerto Rico
- Military career
- Allegiance: Spanish Army
- Service years: 1790-1814
- Rank: Colonel
- Commands: Puerto Rican Militia in Aguadilla
- Conflicts: Defense of San Juan (1797)

Rafael Conti Flores, also spelled "Conty" (October 26, 1746 – September 26, 1814) was a Colonel in the Spanish Army who was in charge of the Puerto Rican Militia in the town of Aguadilla. In 1790, he captured 11 enemy ships involved in smuggling stolen goods. In 1797, he helped defeat Sir Ralph Abercromby and defend Puerto Rico from a British invasion in Aguadilla. In 1809, he organized a military expedition fight with the aim of returning Hispaniola, which now comprises the nations of the Dominican Republic and Haiti, back to Spanish rule.

== Early years ==
Rafael Conti (birth name: Rafael Conti Flores) was born in the town of Cádiz, Andalusia in Spain. There he received his primary and secondary education in private schools. He trained for a military career in a military institution. Upon his graduation in 1766, he was commissioned a Lieutenant of War and continued to serve in Spain.

== Military career ==
Conti was placed in charge of the Puerto Rican Militia in Aguadilla and named sub delegate of the treasury of the town. In 1790, he became aware of the fact that various English vessels were involved in the illegal act of smuggling stolen goods close to the coast of his hometown. Conti then took charge of a sloop and with the help of his men in the militia, he captured and confiscated 11 vessels involved in the illegal activity. He married Juana Josefa Torralbo, daughter of the Spanish appointed Governor of Puerto Rico Francisco Torralbo.

=== Defense of San Juan (1797) ===
On February 17, 1797, the then appointed Governor of Puerto Rico Brigadier General Ramón de Castro, received news that Great Britain had capture the island of Trinidad. Believing that Puerto Rico would be the next British objective he decided to put the local militia on alert and to prepare the island's forts against any invasion. After invading British forces disembarked in 1797 practically all fighting was land based with many skirmishes, field artillery and mortar fire exchanges between the San Gerónimo and San Antonio Bridge fortress and British emplacements in Condado to the East and El Olimpo hill in Miramar to the South. The British tried to take the San Antonio, a key passage to the San Juan islet, and repeatedly bombarded the nearby San Gerónimo using nearly one thousand shells and almost demolishing it. At the Martín Peña Bridge, they were met by the likes of Sergeants José and Francisco Díaz and Conti who together with Lieutenant Lucas de Fuentes attacked the British with two cannons.

After fiercely fighting by the Spanish forces and local militia, all British attempts to advance into San Juan were defeated. The invasion failed because Puerto Rican volunteers and Spanish troops fought back and defended the island in a manner described by a British lieutenant as of “astonishing bravery". The British also attacked Aguadilla and Punta Salinas, where they were met by Conti who had been promoted to Colonel of Artillery, and his men. The British finally withdrew on April 30 to their ships and on May 2 set sail northward. After the invasion had been repulsed, Castro petitioned Charles IV of Spain for recognition for the victors; Conti and several others were promoted and given pay raises.

=== Hispaniola expedition of 1809 ===
Spain neglected her Caribbean holdings and in 1697 Treaty of Ryswick, Spain ceded the island of Hispaniola to France. France came to own the island in 1795, when by the Peace of Basel Spain ceded Santo Domingo as a consequence of the French Revolutionary Wars. At the time, Saint-Domingue's slaves, led by Toussaint Louverture, were in revolt against France. In 1801 they captured Santo Domingo, thus controlling the entire island; but in 1802 an army sent by Napoleon captured Toussaint Louverture and sent him to France as prisoner. However, Toussaint Louverture's lieutenants, plus the spread of yellow fever, succeeded in expelling the French again from Saint-Domingue, which in 1804 the rebels made independent as the Republic of Haiti. Eastwards, France continued to rule Spanish Santo Domingo.

In 1808, following Napoleon's invasion of Spain, the criollos of Santo Domingo revolted against French rule. Conti organized an expedition to return Hispaniola back to Spain. Col Conti together with naval Captain Ramón Power y Giralt, a Puerto Rican, distinguished themselves with the defense of the Dominican Republic against an invasion from the French forces by enforcing a blockade with the aid of Great Britain (Spain's ally at the time) and Haiti, returned Santo Domingo to Spanish control.

== Legacy ==
On September 26, 1814, Conti died in the City of Mayagüez, Puerto Rico.

== Military decoration ==
Military decoration awarded to Conti:

Royal and Military Order of Saint Hermenegildo gold cross in bronze gilt

== See also ==
- List of Puerto Ricans
- List of Puerto Rican military personnel
- Military history of Puerto Rico
- José and Francisco Díaz
