= Castillo San Cristóbal (San Juan) =

Fortress in San Juan, Puerto Rico

- San Cristóbal
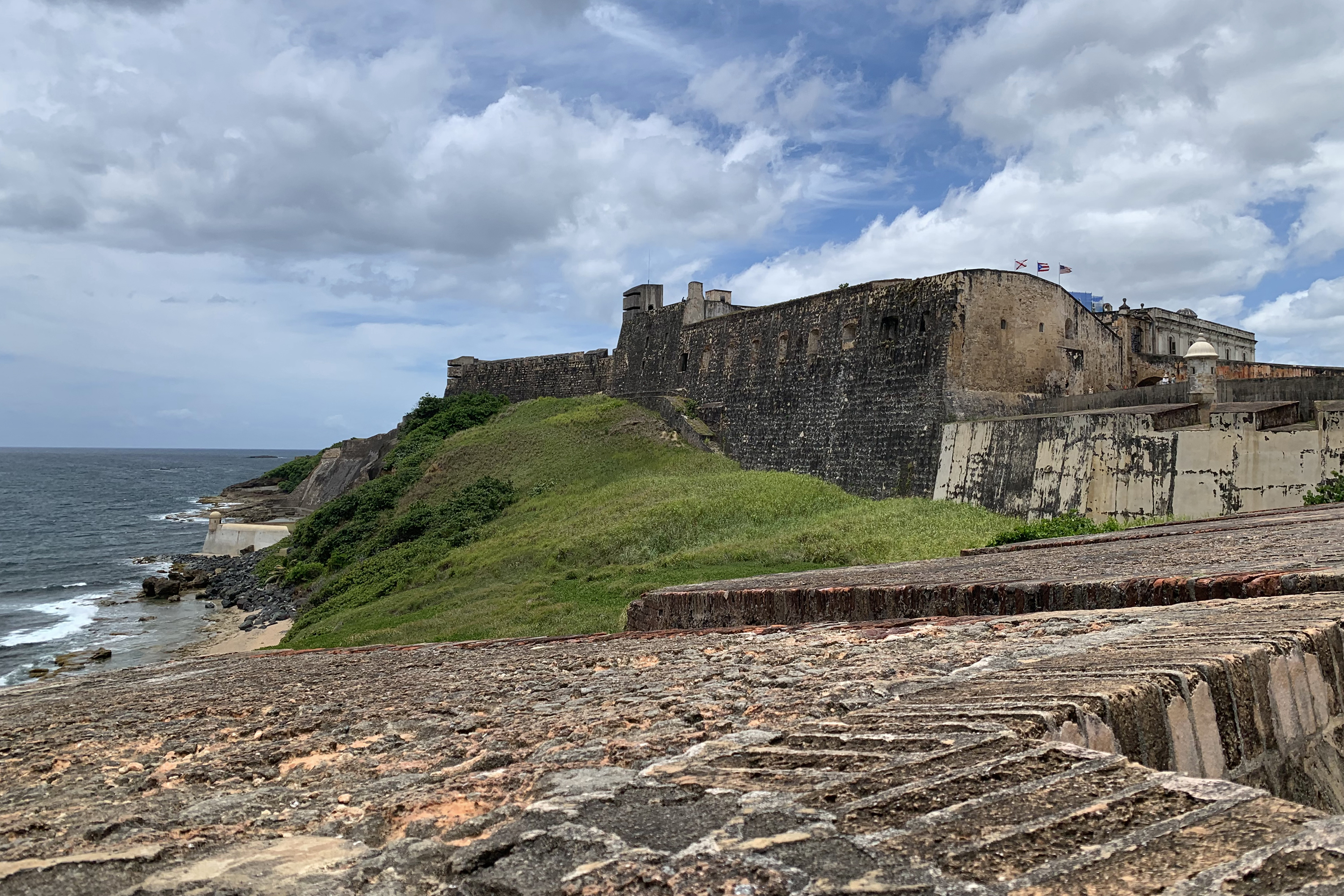
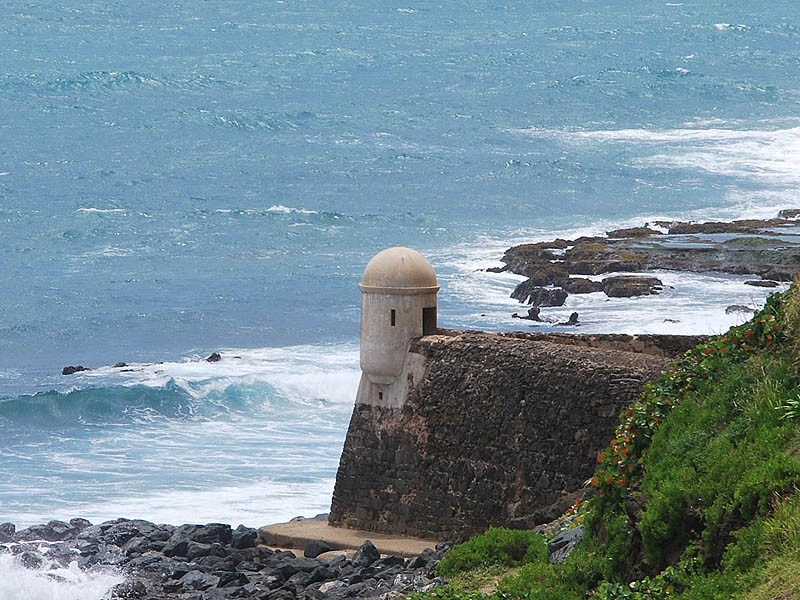
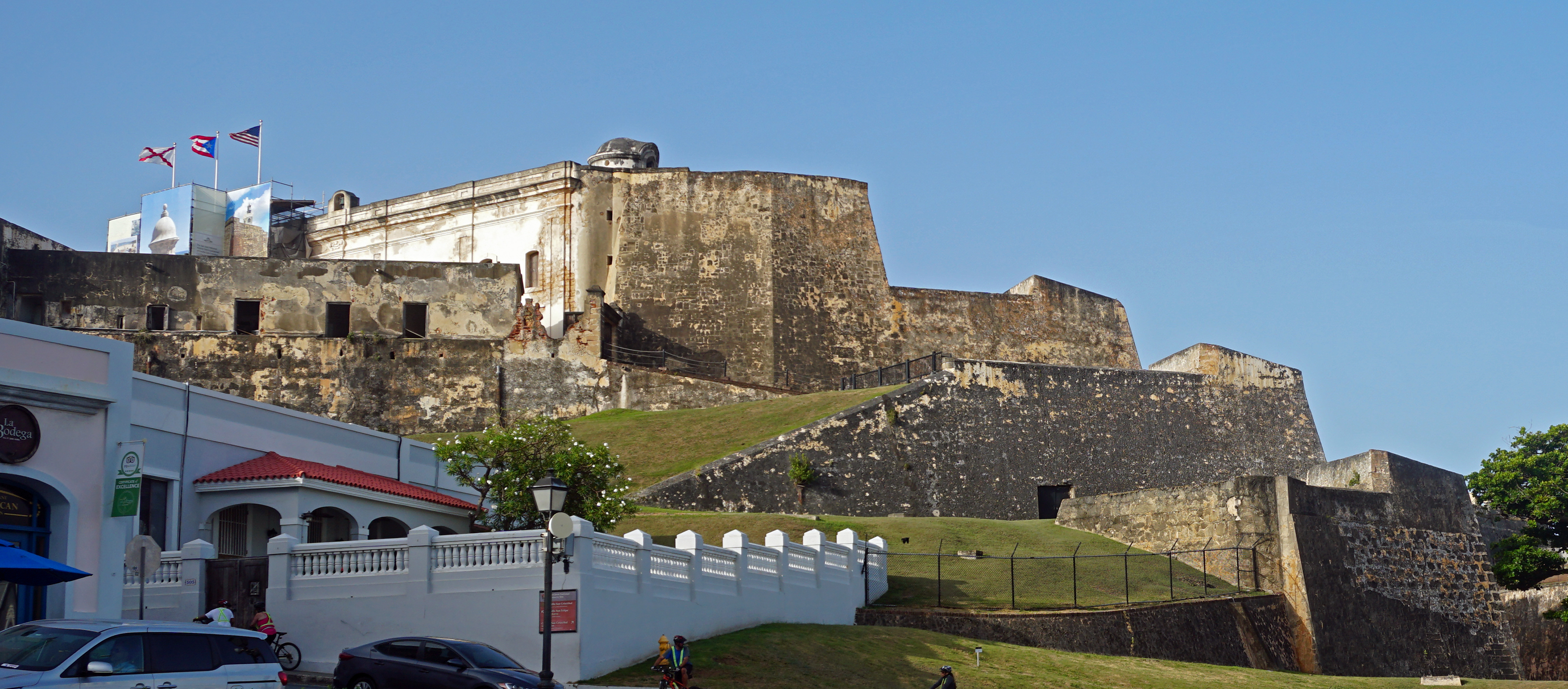
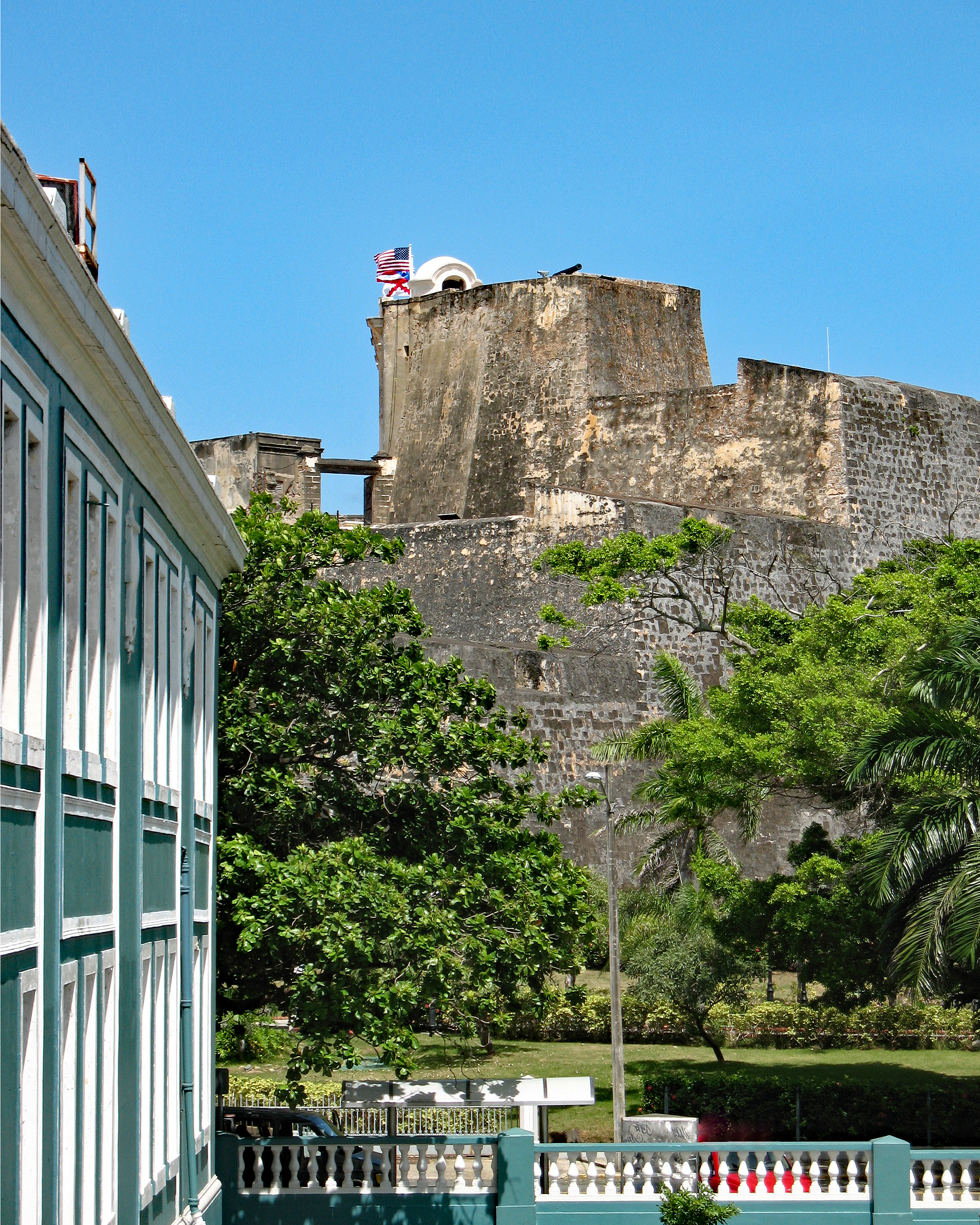
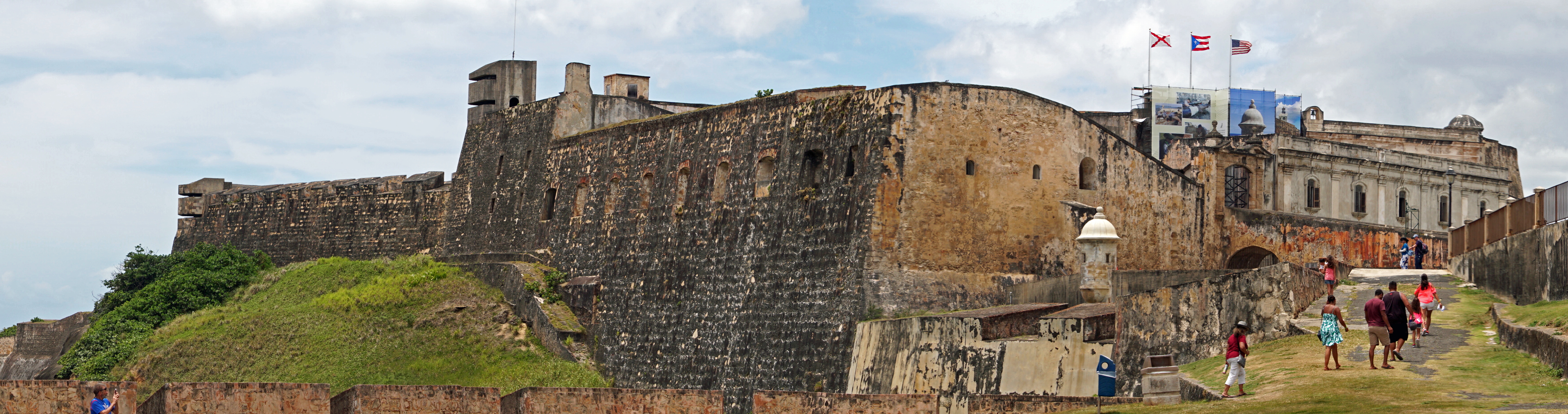
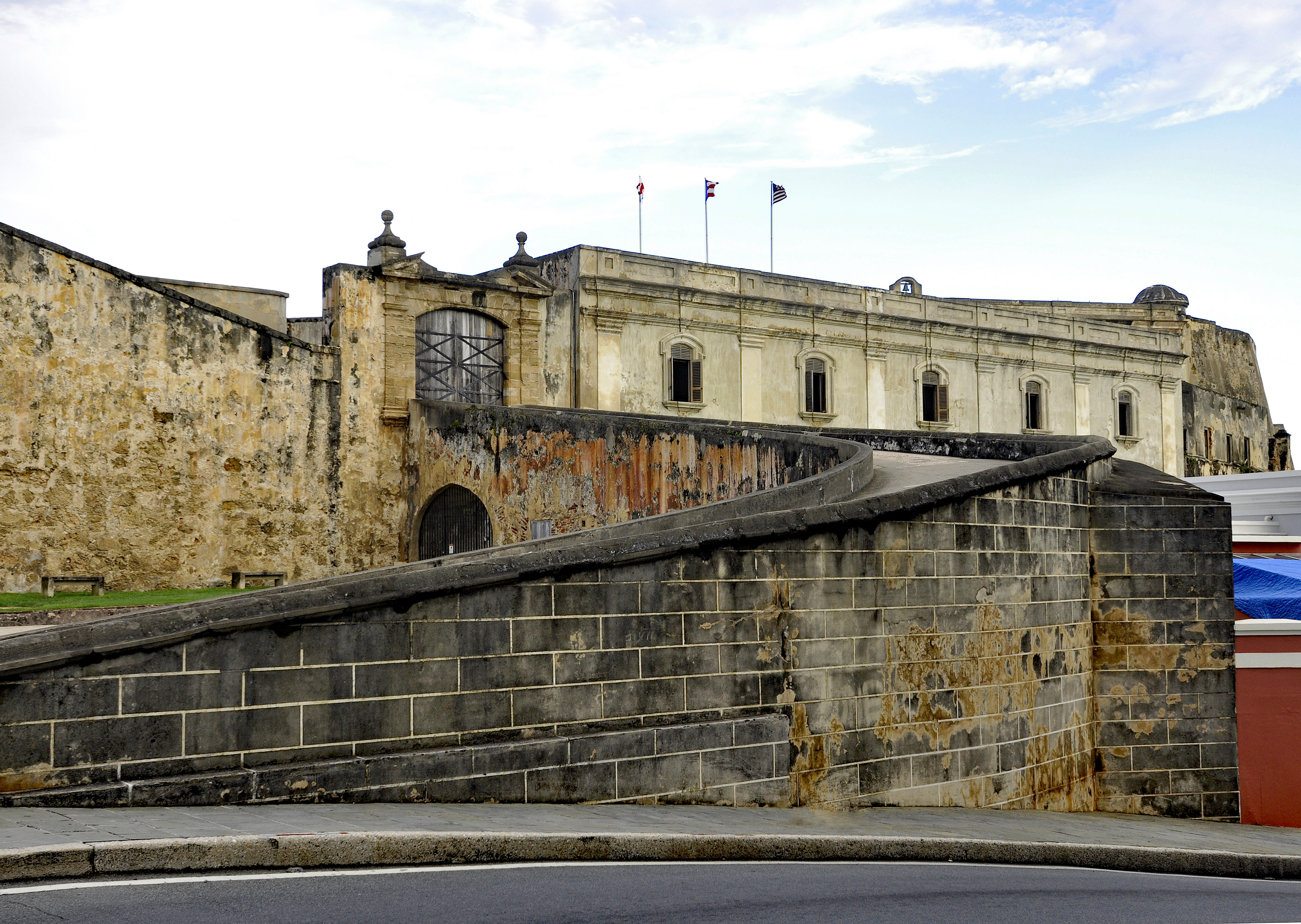
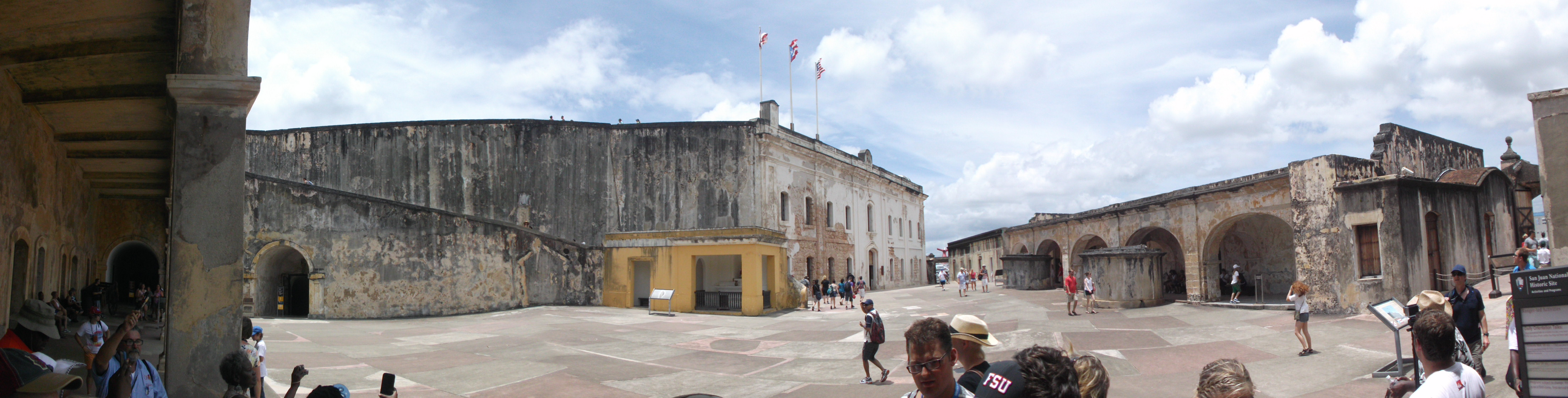
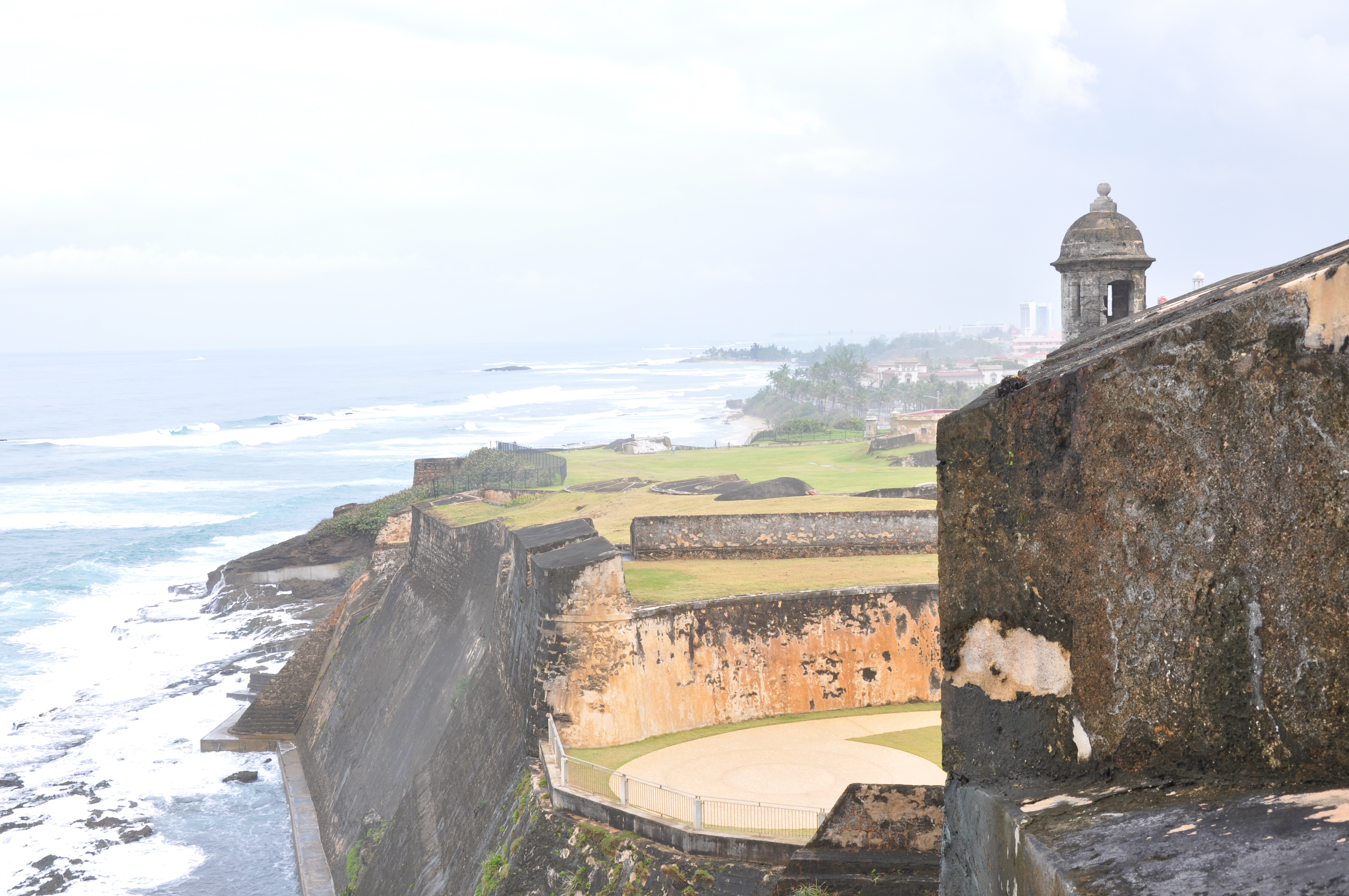
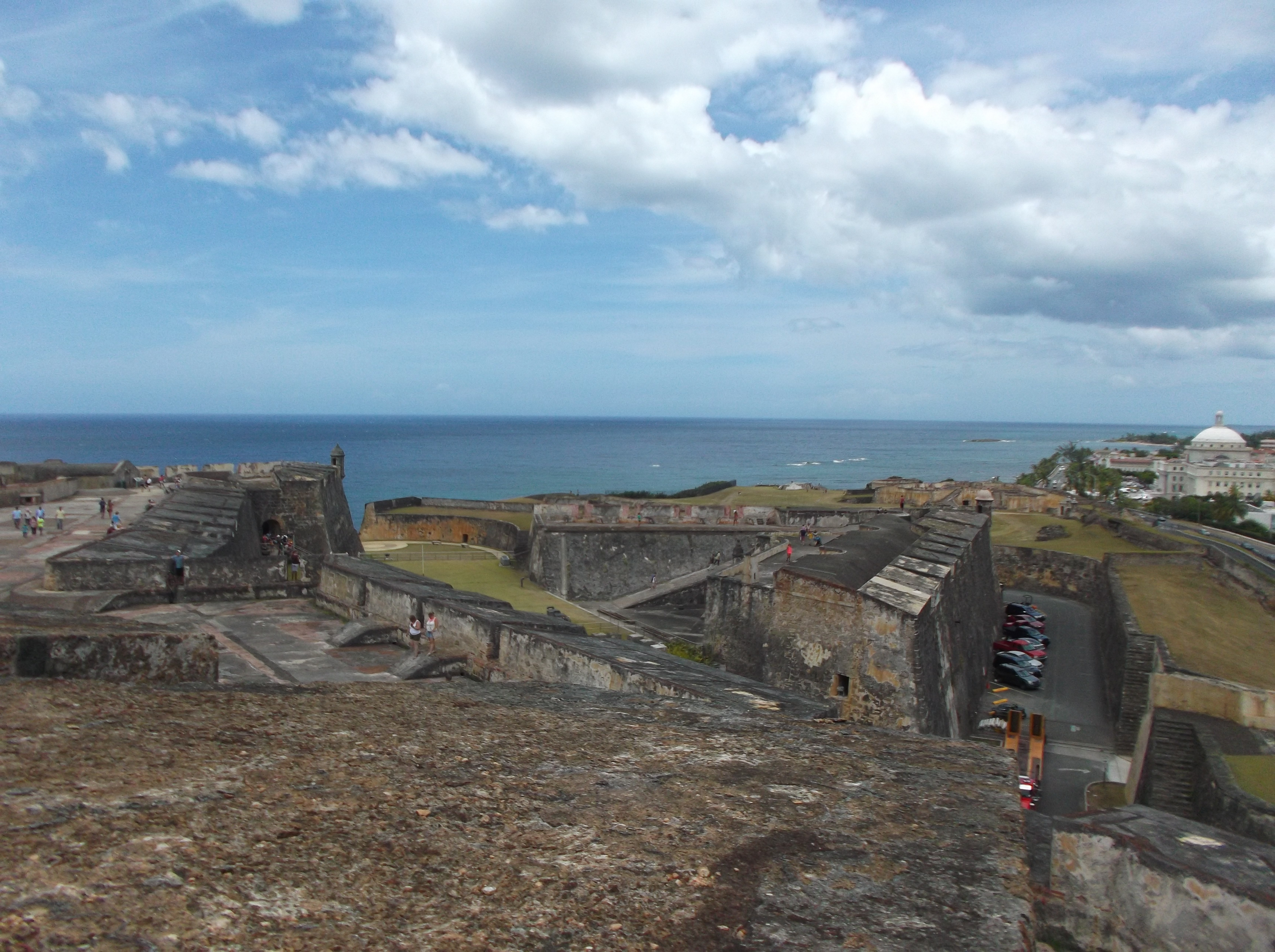
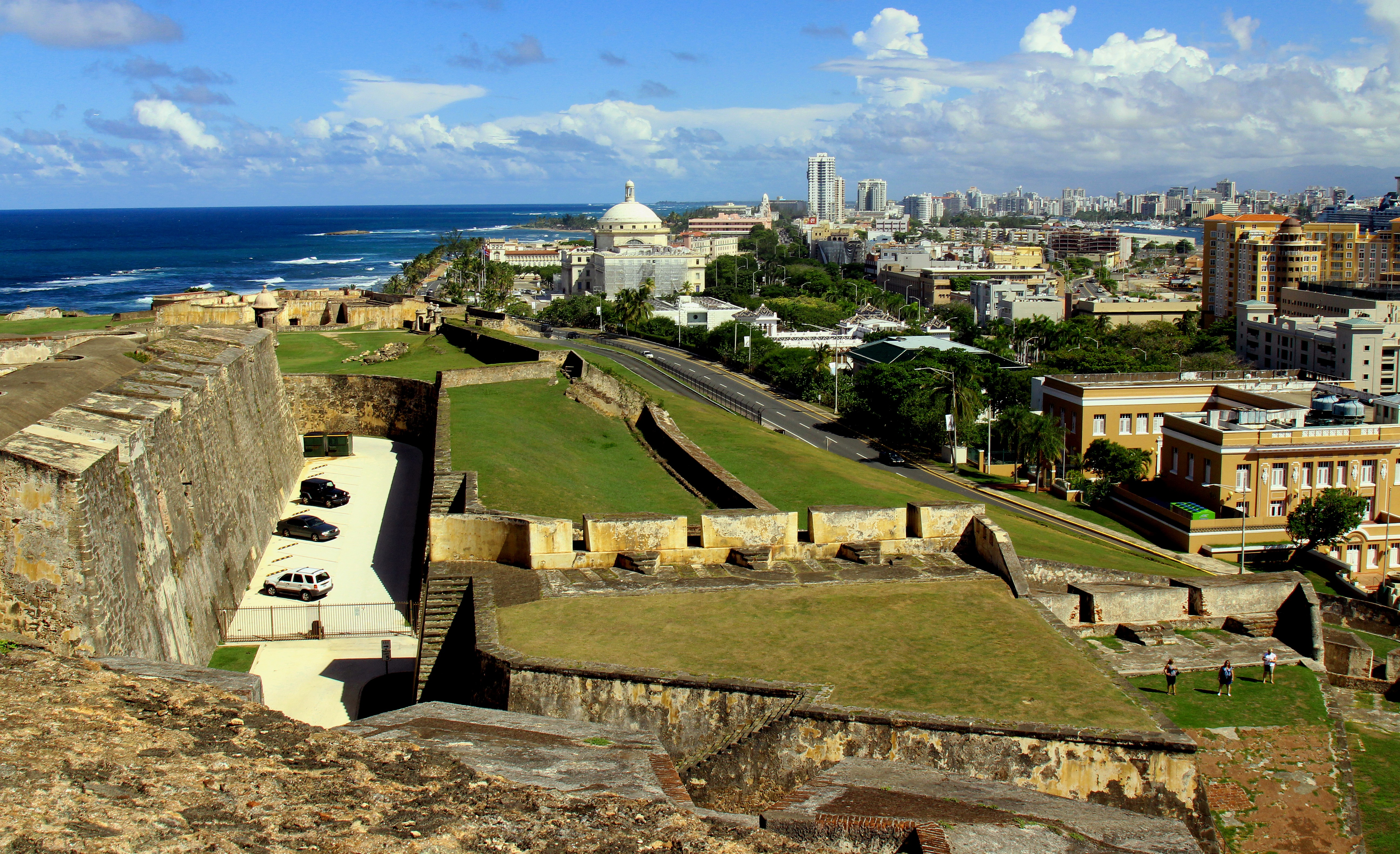
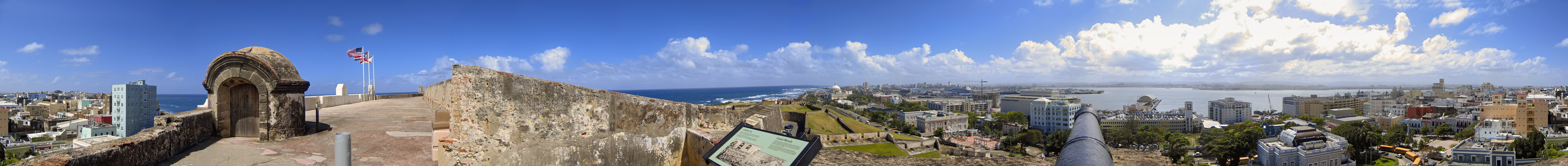
- From top, left to right: Front of main fortification in San Cristóbal from northern section of the Walls of Old San Juan overlooking the Atlantic; Garita del Diablo ("devil’s sentry box") or Fortín del Espigón ("breakwater fort"); curtain wall where demolished part used to connect; curtain wall and third-level battlements on Caballero de San Miguel (Saint Michael Cavalier); main fortification of fortress; main courtyard or bailey with cisterns visible on far right; Batería y Plaza de Santa Teresa (Saint Teresa Battery and Plaza) and glacis from inside WWII bunker; Revellín de San Carlos (Saint Charles Ravelin), Revellín El Abanico (The Fan Ravelin), and Batteria de la Princesa (The Princess Battery) from third-level battlements; Contraguardia de la Trinidad (Trinity Counterguard) and deep dry moats; ramped and gated entrance from Plaza Norzagaray; panorama onto Old San Juan, San Juan Bay, and Santurce from third-level battlements
- Interactive

General information
- Type: Medieval fortification Citadel
- Architectural style: Classical architecture
- Location: San Juan Islet, Old San Juan, Puerto Rico, 501 Calle Norzagaray, Old San Juan, San Juan, PR, 00901
- Coordinates: 18°28′02″N 66°06′40″W
- Construction started: 1634
- Completed: 1783

Height
- Height: 150 ft (46 m)

Technical details
- Material: Sandstone, Brick, Sand, Clay
- Size: 27 acres (11 ha)

Design and construction
- Engineer: Thomas O’Daly (1765)
- Known for: Battle of San Juan (1797) Bombardment of San Juan (1898)

UNESCO World Heritage Site
- Type: Cultural
- Criteria: vi
- Designated: 1983 (7th session)
- Part of: La Fortaleza and San Juan National Historic Site in Puerto Rico
- Reference no.: 266
- Region: The Americas

U.S. National Register of Historic Places
- Designated: October 15, 1966
- Part of: San Juan National Historic Site
- Reference no.: 66000930

Castillo San Cristóbal (English: Saint Christopher Castle) is a fortress in the Old San Juan historic quarter of San Juan, the capital municipality of Puerto Rico, known for being the largest fortification built by the Spanish in the New World. Dating back to defense expansions following attacks by the English in 1598 and Dutch in 1625, it was first constructed in 1634 as the Caballero de San Miguel (Saint Michael Cavalier) and the Garita del Diablo ("devil’s sentry box"). Over the next 150 years, especially in the reign of King Charles III of Spain, it continued to be developed into a bastion fort with outer ravelins and batteries to reach its largest size in 1783. Rising 150 ft from the Atlantic shoreline, the three-level edifice stands on a hill at the northern coastline of San Juan Islet, guarding the land entry to Old San Juan. Alongside El Morro, La Fortaleza, and other forts part of the Walls of Old San Juan, it protected strategically and militarily important Puerto Rico, or La Llave de las Indias (The Key to the Indies), from invasion by competing world powers during the Age of Sail. It was designated a World Heritage Site by UNESCO in 1983.

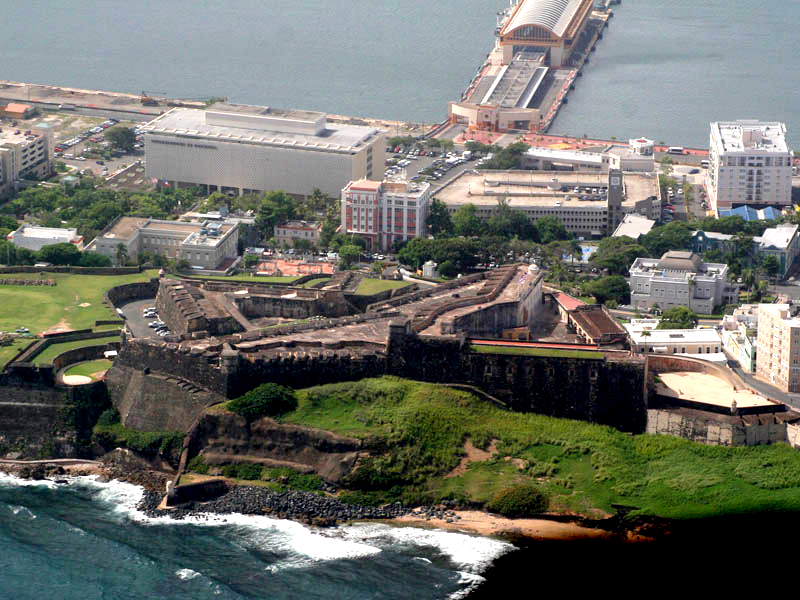
Aerial view of the main fortification of San Cristóbal, not including the glacis or esplanade to the east, where other parts of the fortress are located

== History ==
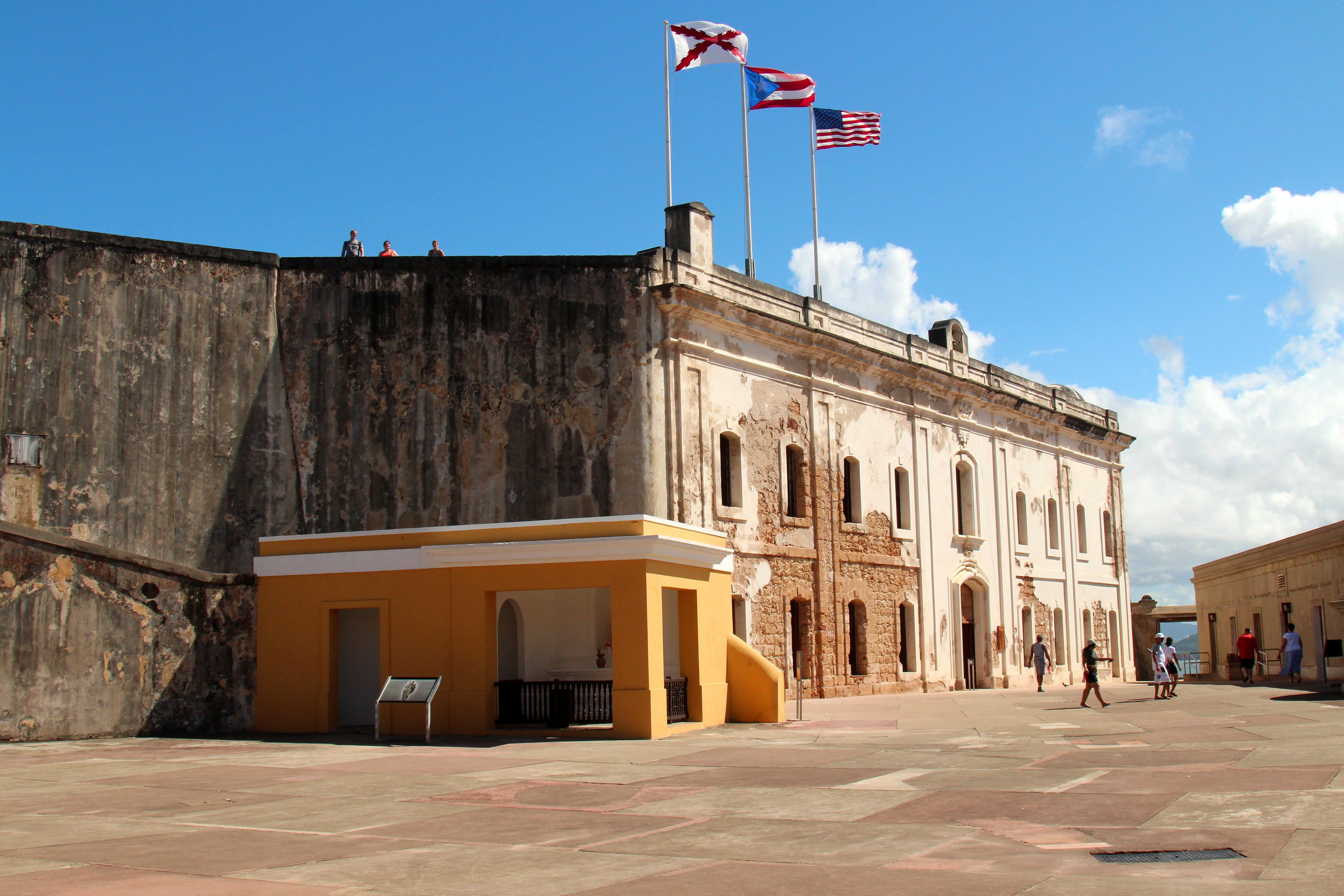
The flags of the United States, Puerto Rico, and the Spanish Empire fly over San Cristóbal

Castillo San Cristóbal was built on a hill originally known as the Cerro de la Horca ("gallows Hill") or the Cerro del Quemadero ("burner’s hill"), changed to Cerro de San Cristóbal in honor of Saint Christopher, the patron of travelers. The fortress is considered the largest fortification built by Spain in the New World. When it was completed in 1783, it covered about 27 acres. The entrances to it were protected by two gates and drawbridges in what was called the Revellín de Santiago (Saint James Ravelin) and the Bastión de Santiago (Saint James Bastion). After close to a hundred years of relative peace in the area, this section of the fortification (about a third) was demolished in 1897 to help ease the flow of traffic in and out of the walled city.

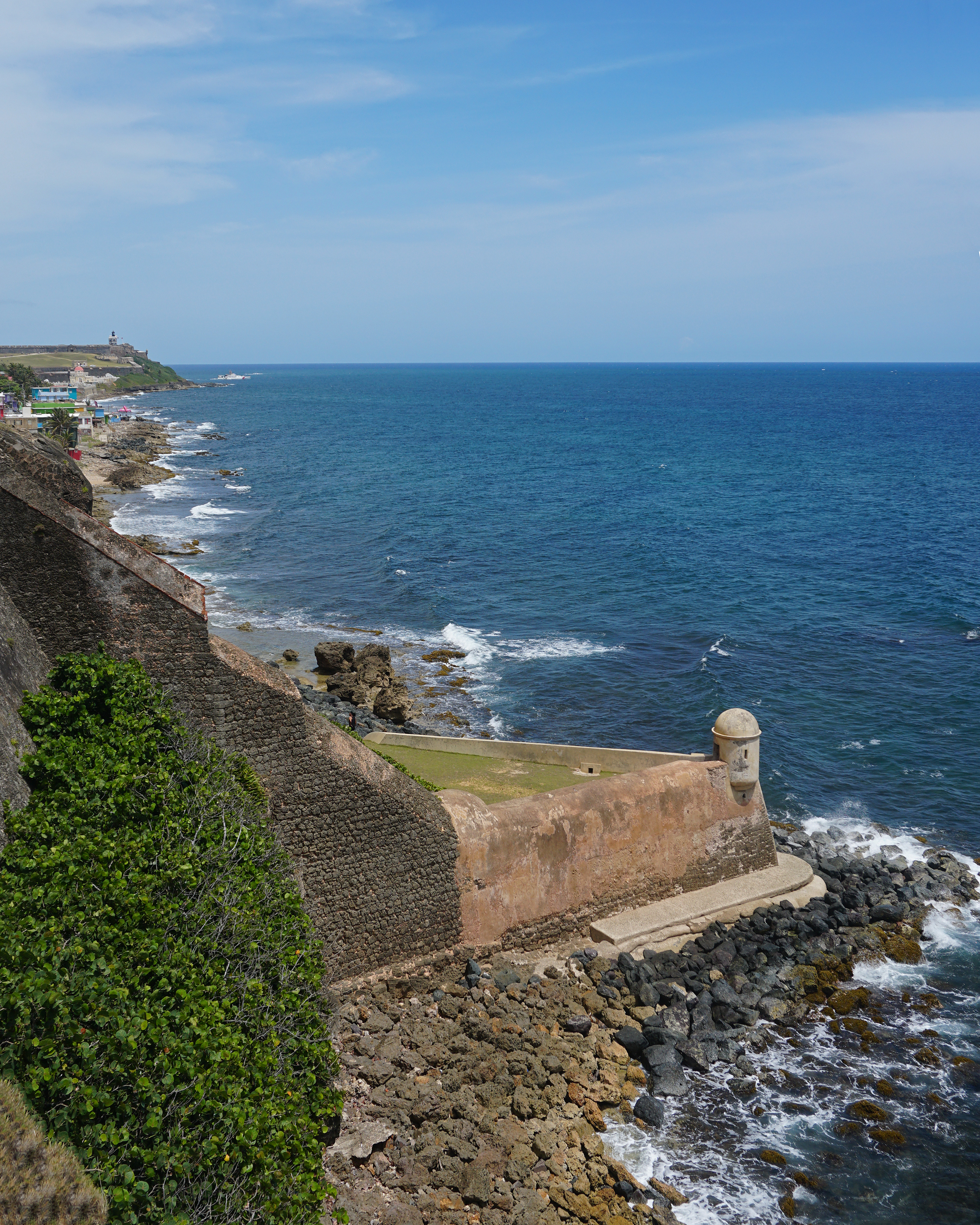
Garita del Diablo immediately next to the Atlantic Ocean

In 1634, the first defensive structure had been built in the area, the Fortín del Espigón ("breakwater fort") or the Garita del Diablo ("devil’s sentry box"). In 1765, San Cristóbal was conformed by a hornwork surrounded by a dry moat, which gave continuity to the walls of the city, and at the highest point of it, there was an artillery platform, or Caballero de San Miguel (Knight of Saint Michael), for the emplacement of cannons. San Cristóbal derives its name from the hill on which the main defenses were built against the invasion of the city by land, although it also defended the north coast. By the time the work was completed, it became, the most extensive Spanish fortification in all of the Americas.

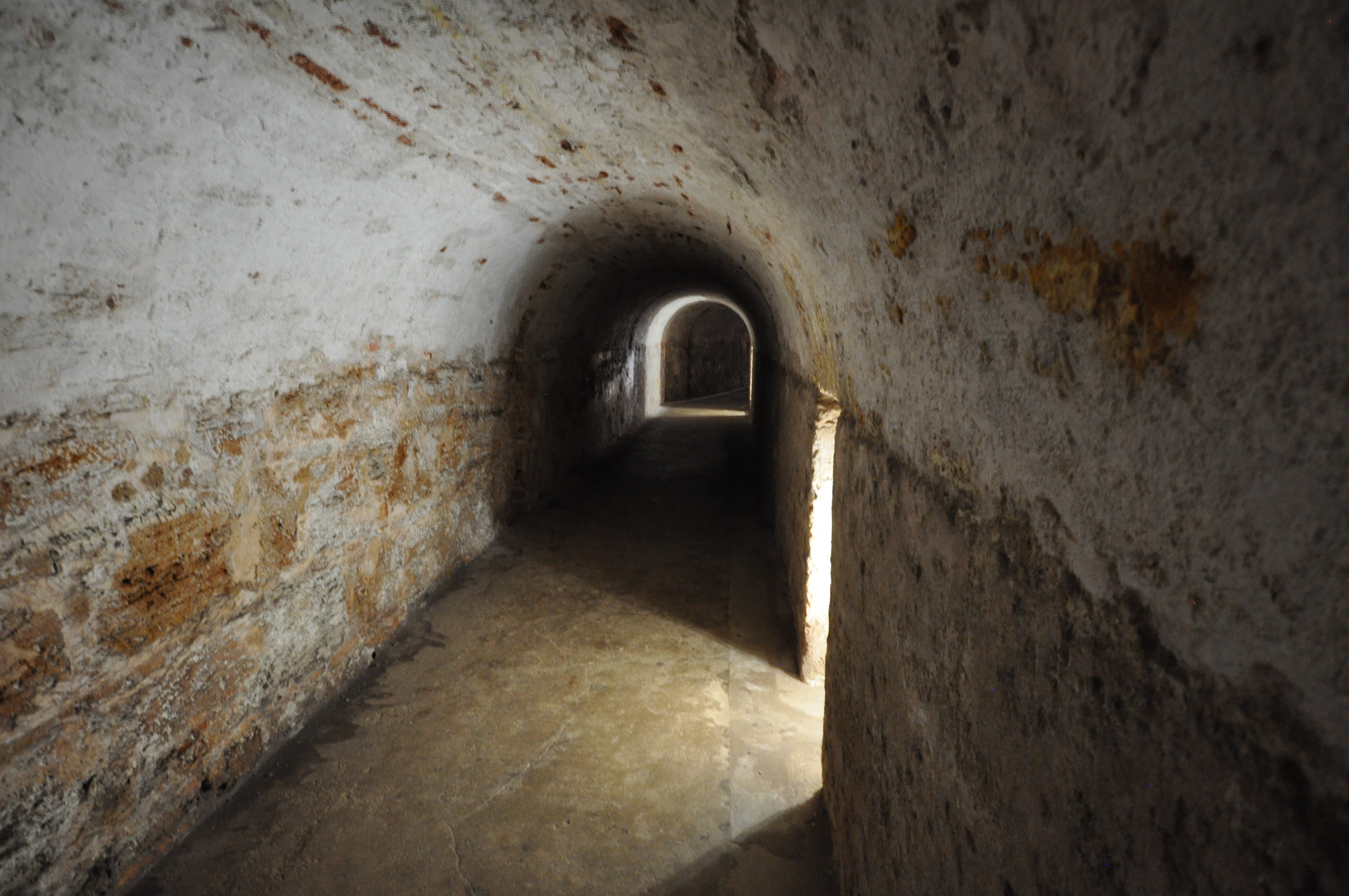
Tunnel passageway connecting the different sections of the fortress

Charles III of Spain came to the Spanish throne in 1759, and in 1764 ordered Field Marshal Alexander O'Reilly and the engineers, Colonel Tomás O'Daly and Juan Francisco Mestre, to make the island a stronghold, a defense of the first order. The plans constituted the preparation for a war with England, which seemed inevitable. The order coincided with the Siege of Havana temporarily by the English. As a result of O'Reily's reforms, the Revellín de San Carlos (Saint Charles Ravelin) and the counterguard of La Trinidad (The Trinity) were built. Further east, a fort called El Abanico (The Fan) and a battery overlooking the sea, La Princesa (The Princess), were built. By 1788, the year of the king's death, the reforms were complete. The defenses proved their effectiveness since in 1797 they helped to repel the invasion of seven thousand English soldiers commanded by the British general Ralph Abercromby.

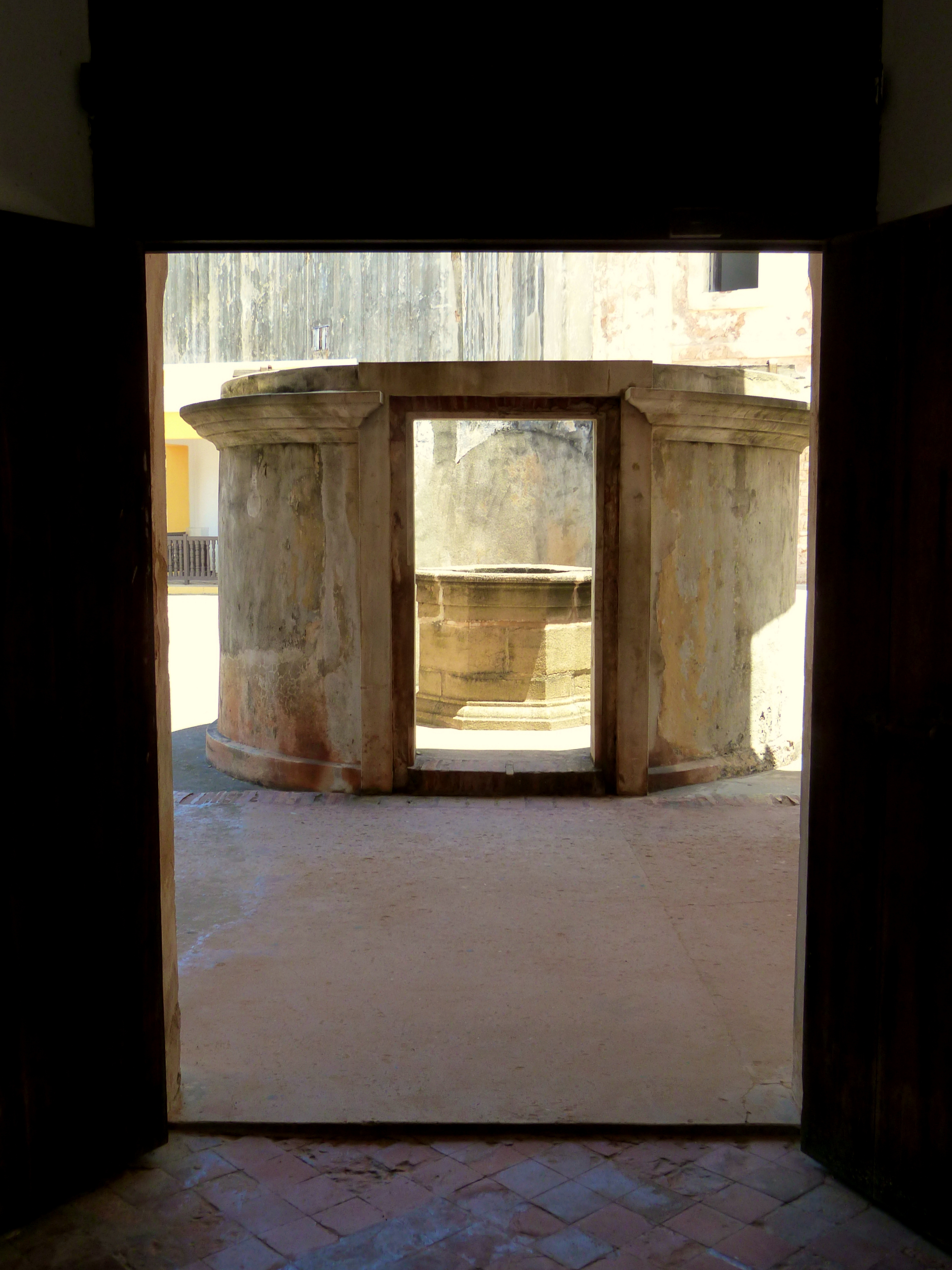
Opening of cistern in the fortress

Castillo San Cristóbal also contains five cisterns that were used for the storage of water during the ages of the Spanish Colony. They are extremely large (24 ft tall, 17 ft wide, and 57 ft long) and were used as bomb shelters during World War II.

== Historical gallery ==
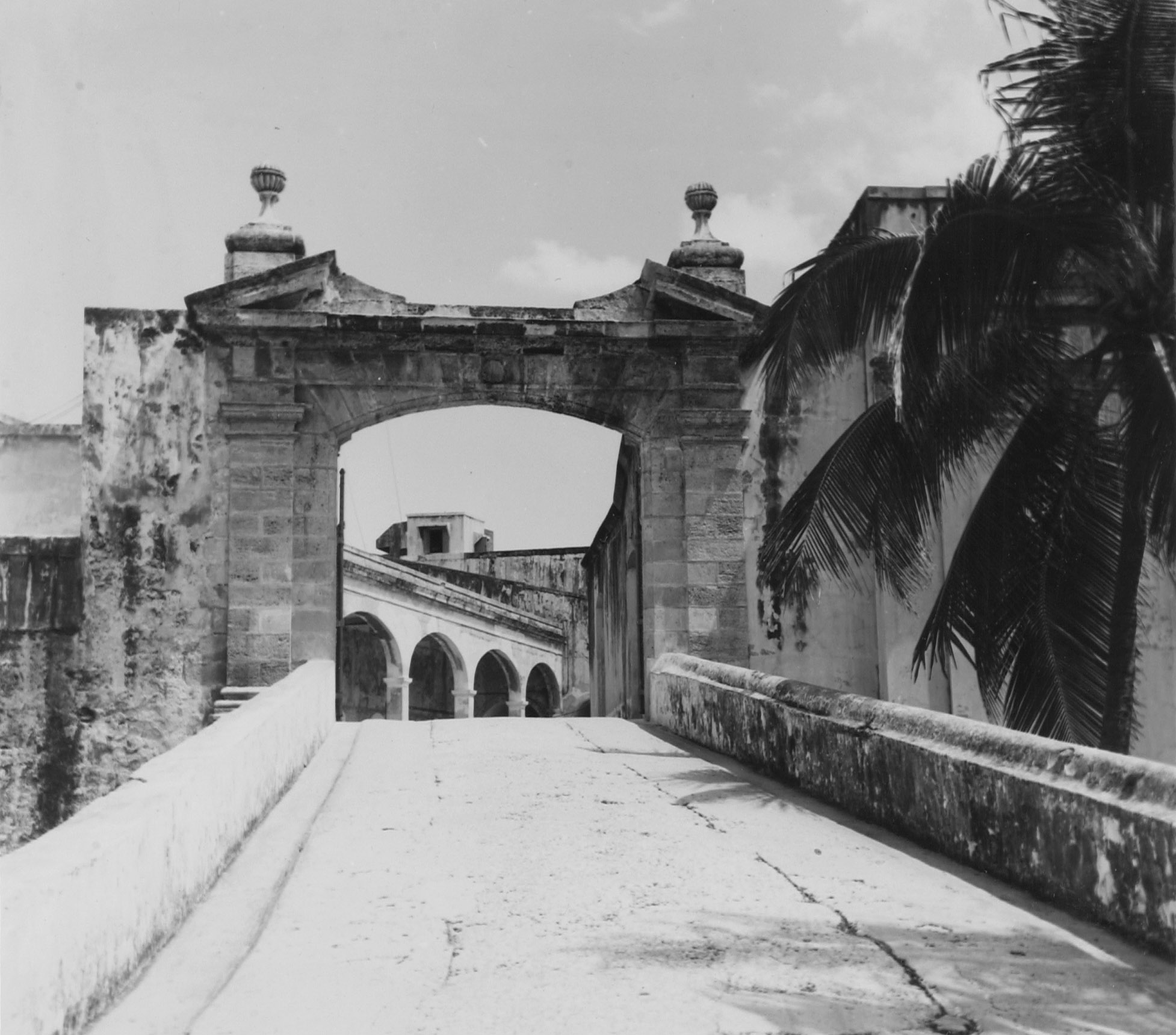
Castillo de San Cristóbal in 1964. Nationaal Museum van Wereldculturen.

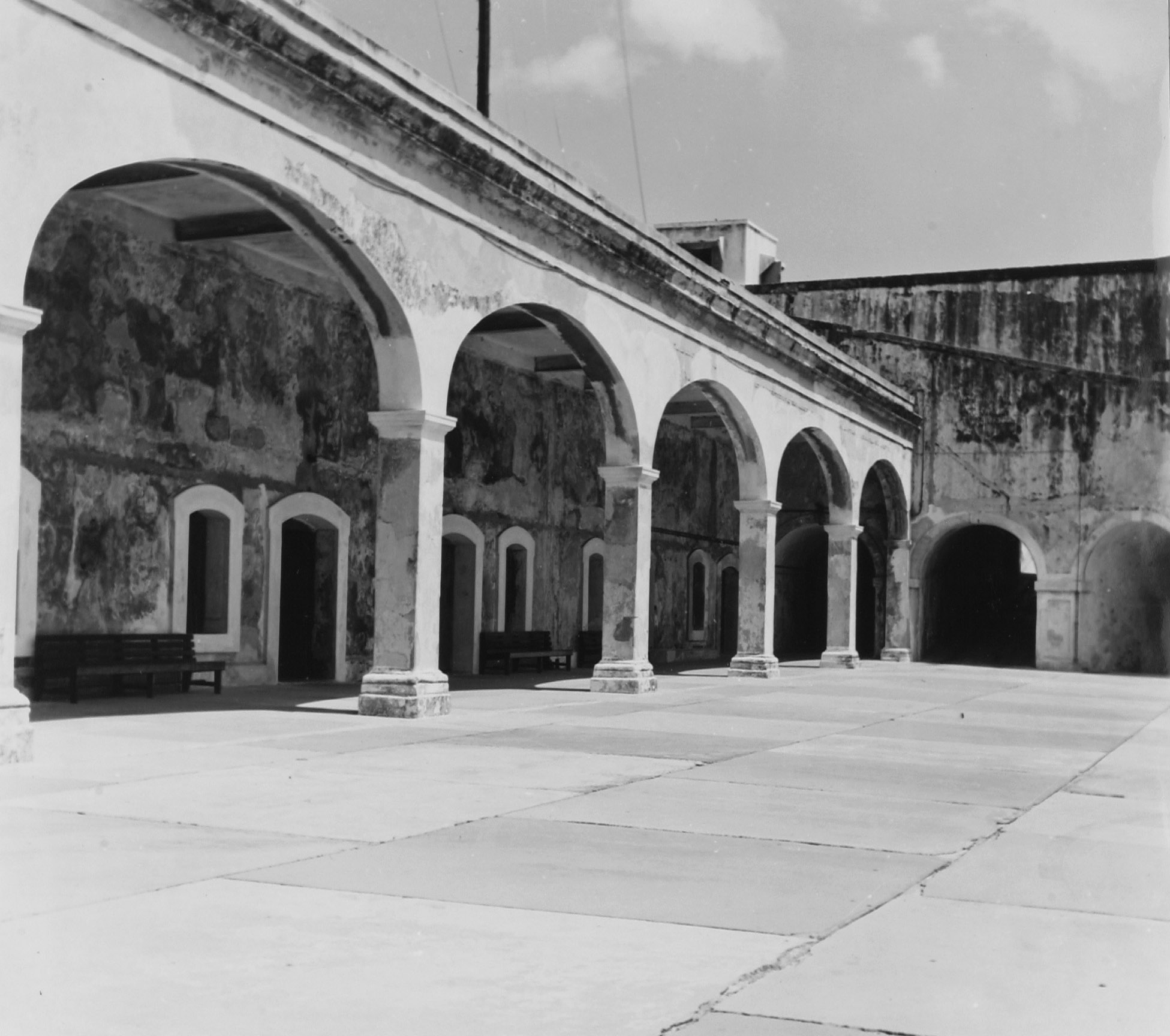
Castillo de San Cristóbal in 1964. Nationaal Museum van Wereldculturen.

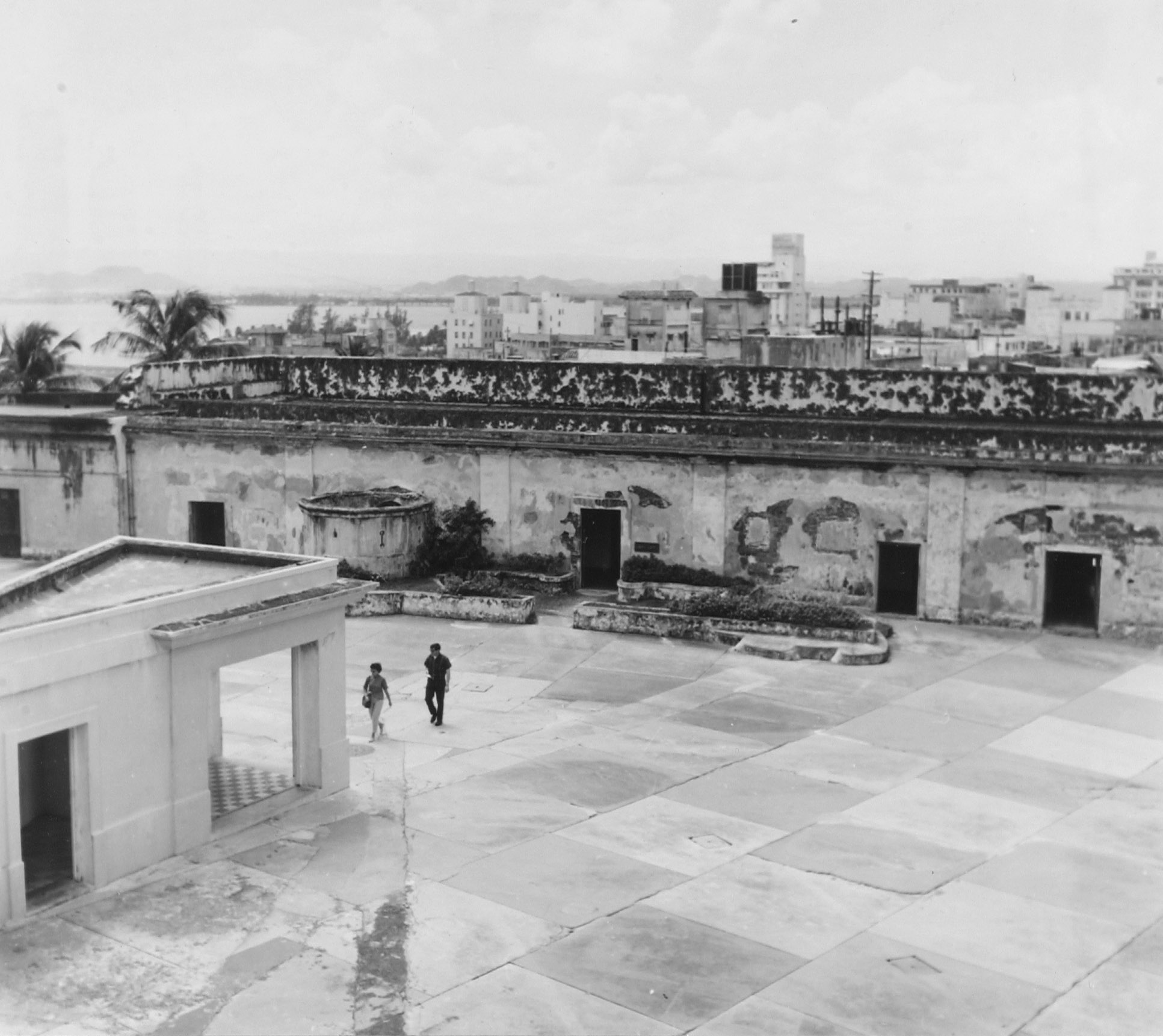
Castillo de San Cristóbal in 1964. Nationaal Museum van Wereldculturen.

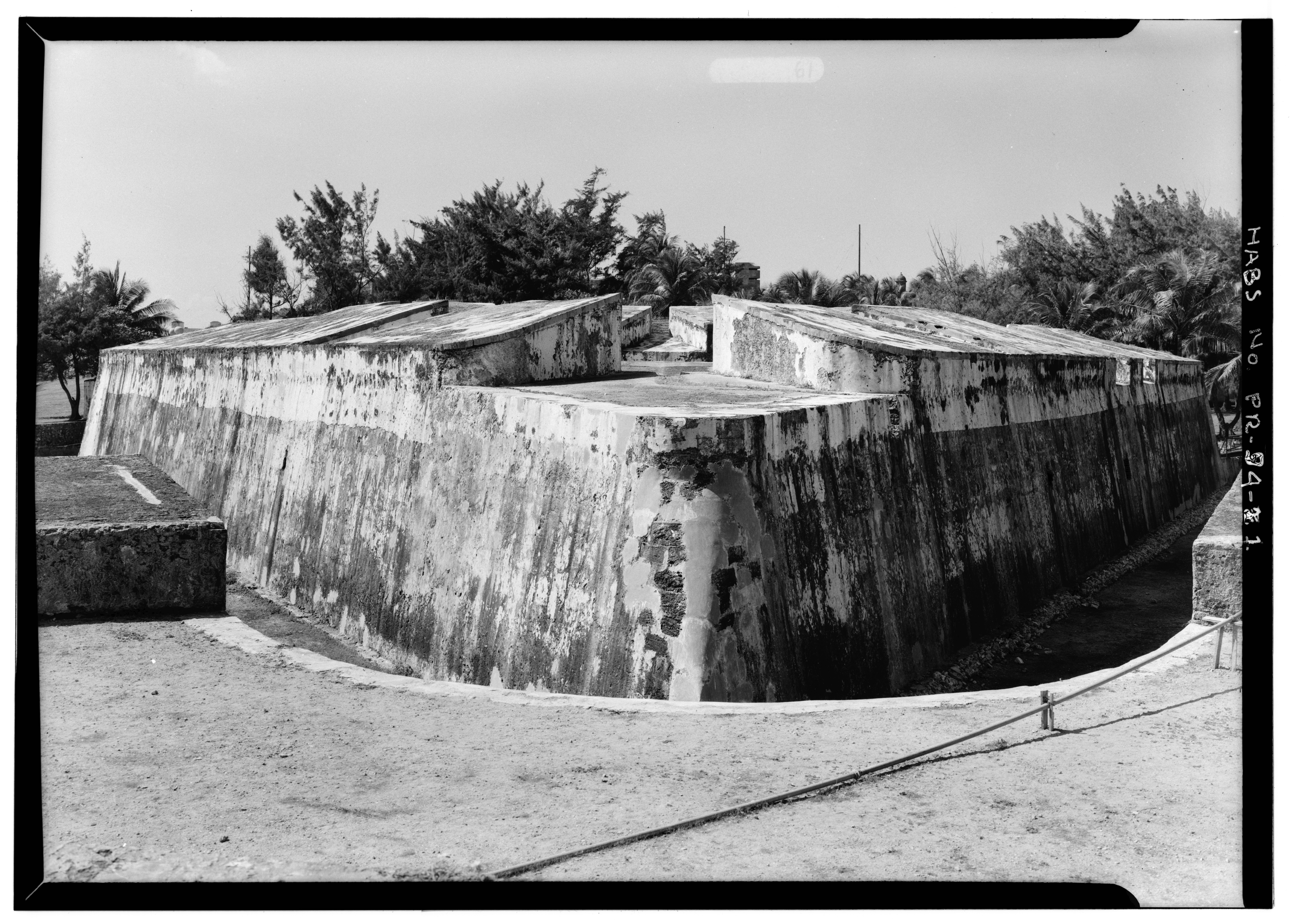
Fuerte El Abanico in 1933. Library of Congress.

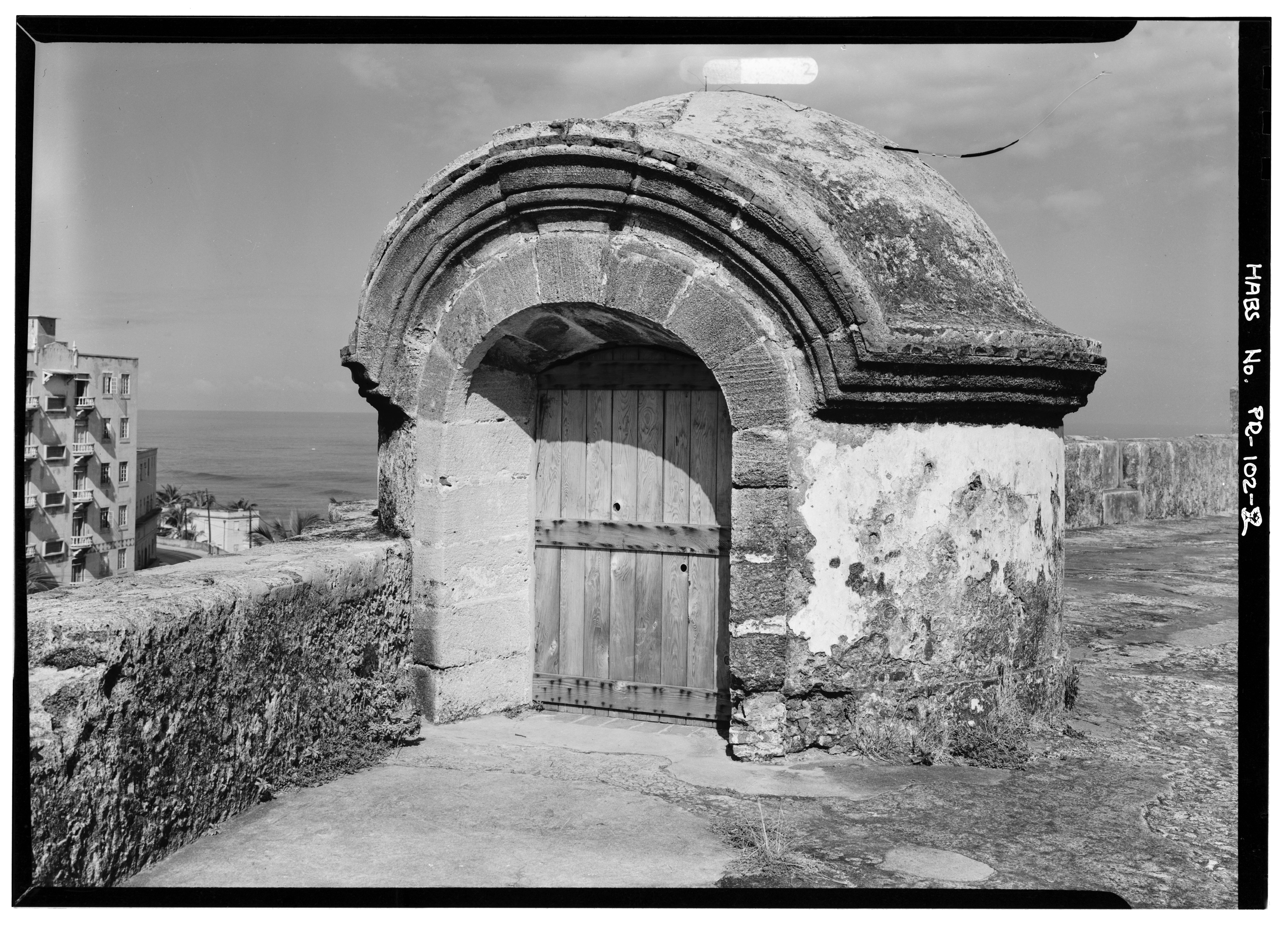
Detail of Stairhead, door and Arco on Caballero de San Miguel, in 1933. Library of Congress.

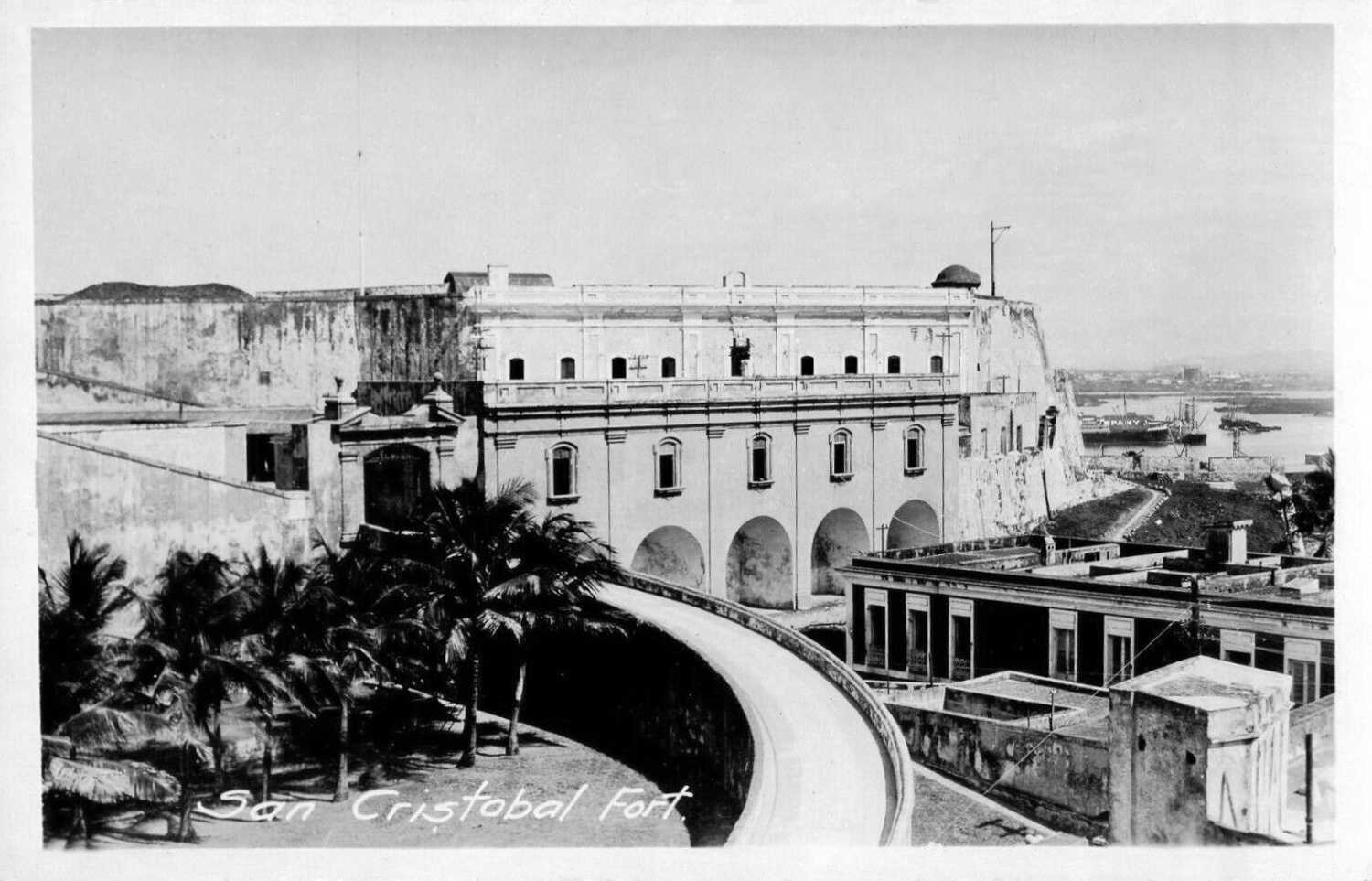
A view of the Castillo de San Cristóbal in 1915.

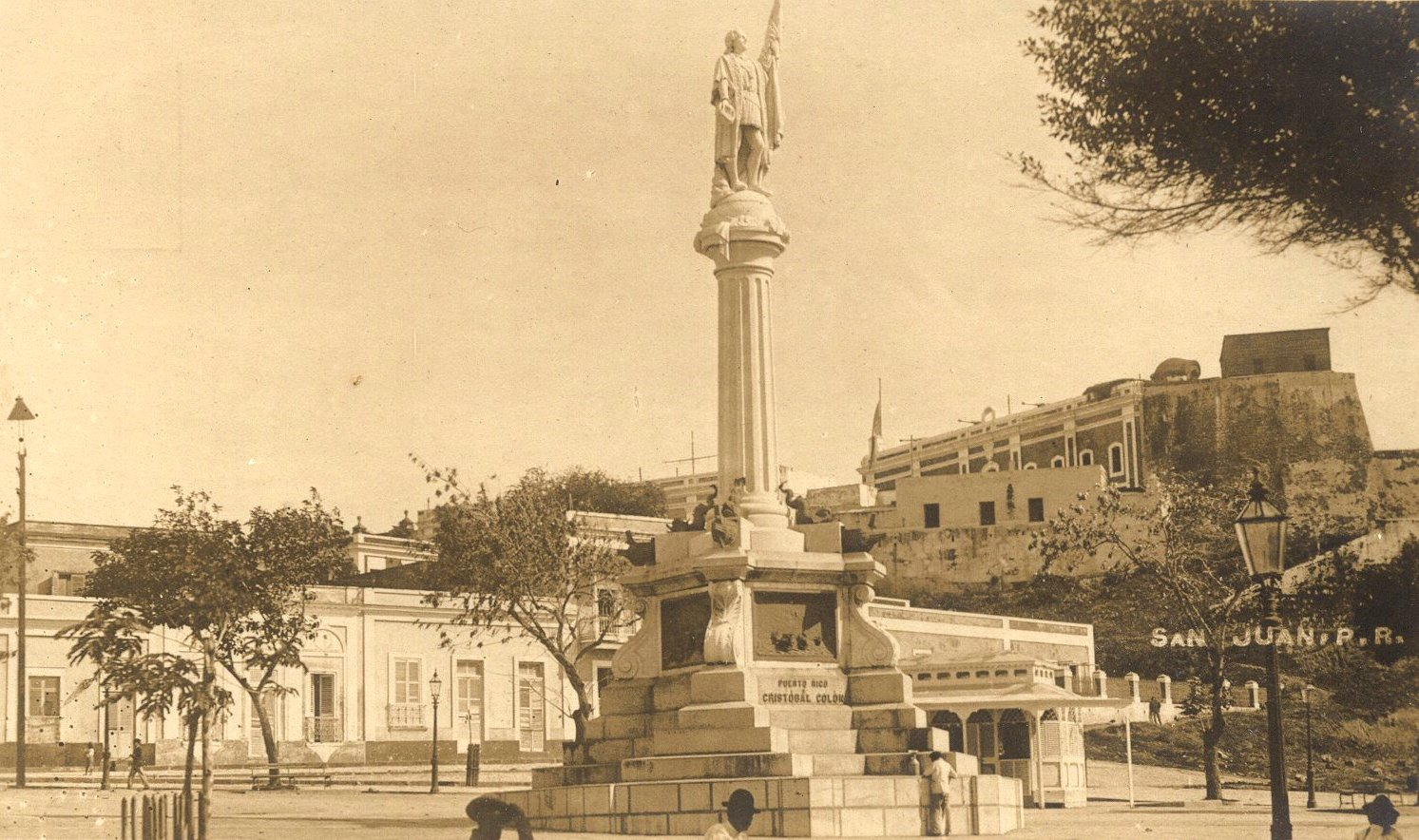
Christopher Columbus monument at Plaza Cristóbal Colon, it appears to have been erected in 1894. Postcard published circa 1900–1915.

== Historical timeline ==
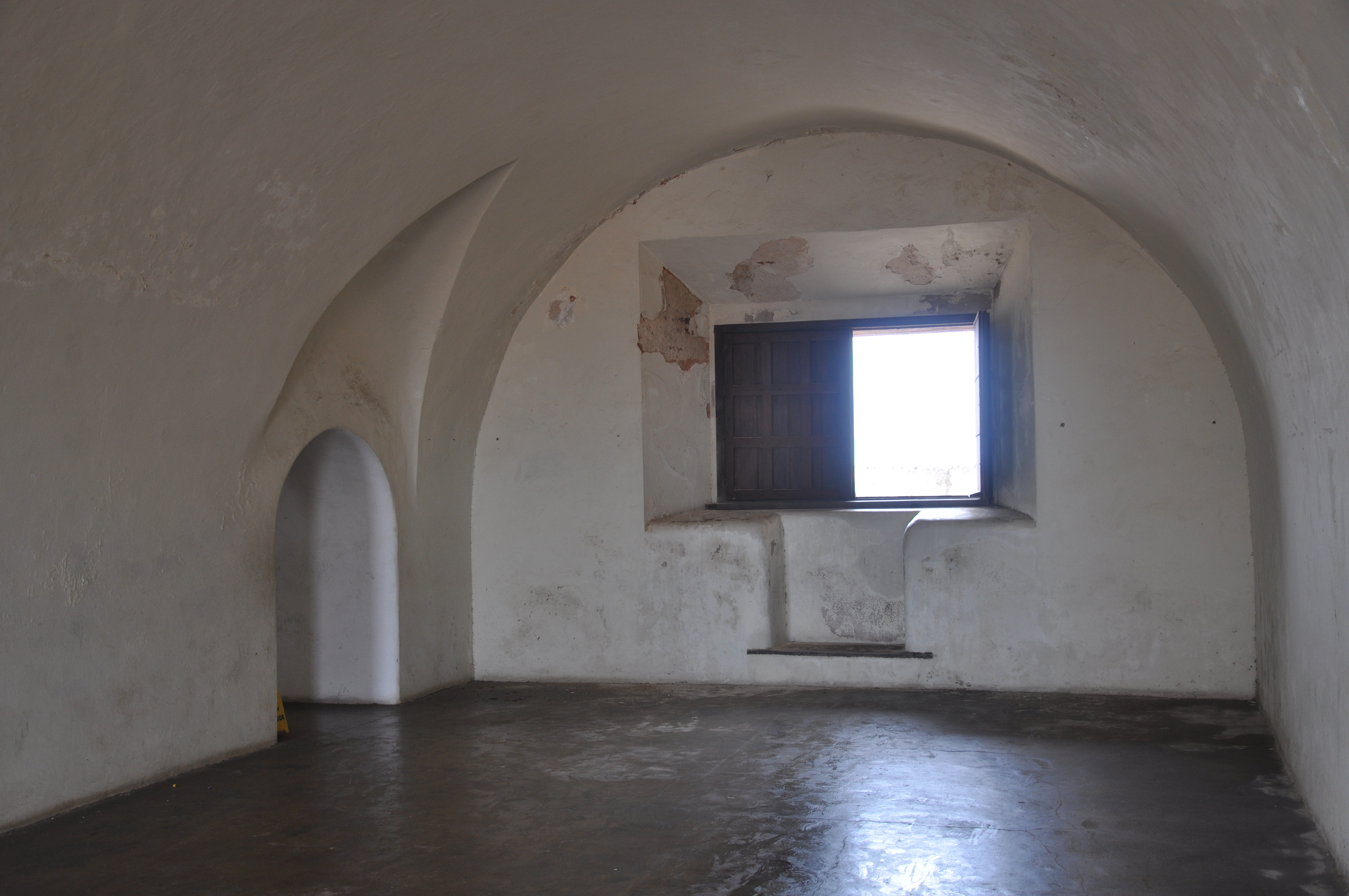
Inside of main fortification in fortress

1521 – San Juan founded by Spanish settlers from Caparra.

1539 – Construction of the first fortified defenses at Castillo San Felipe del Morro and La Fortaleza, with batteries aimed at the harbor entrance.

1595 – The English attack San Juan, led by Sir Francis Drake, 25 ships penetrated the line of fire from El Morro. At the end of the battle the English fled taking some prisoners but no treasure, the reason for which they attacked.

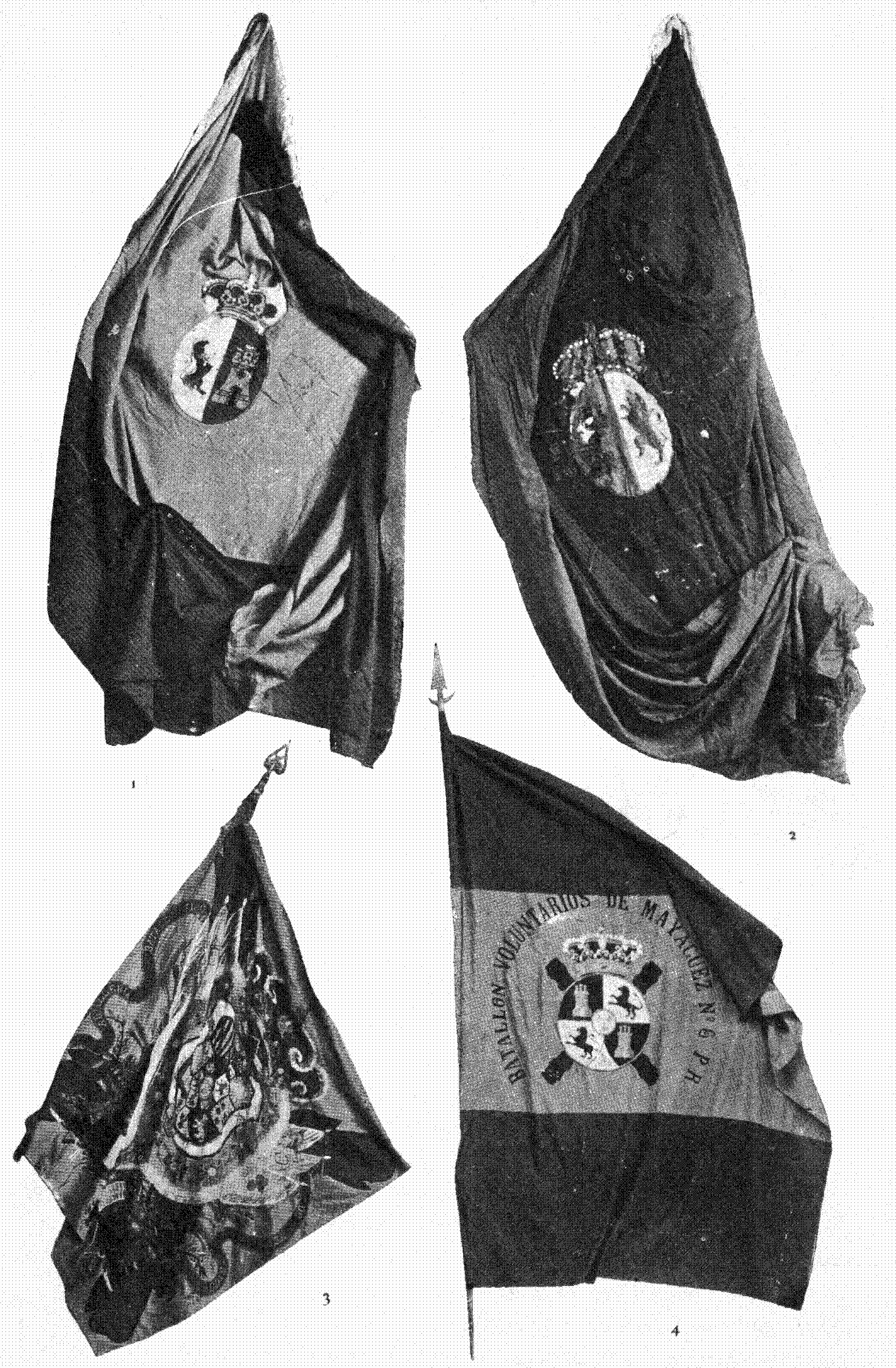
-1. War flag that flew in the castle of San Cristóbal, on May 12, 1898. Nº 3.471 of the Artillery Museum Catalog.-2. War flag that flew at the Morro Castle, on May 12, 1898. Nº 3.472 of the Artillery Museum Catalog.-3. Banner of the 12th artillery battalion, whose force covered the batteries of San Juan during the battle of May 12, 1898. Nº 3.466 of the Artillery Museum Catalog.-4. Flag of the Mayagüez Volunteers battalion. Nº 4.972 of the Artillery Museum Catalog.

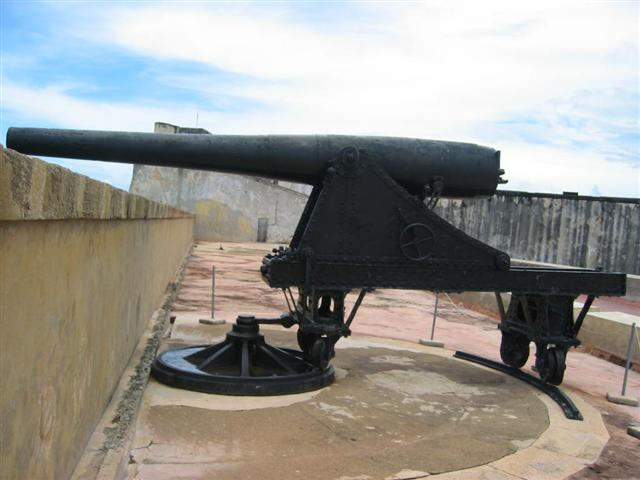
Ordóñez gun

1625 – The Dutch attack and take San Juan from the land side. Construction of some form of defense for San Cristóbal Hill was ordered to prevent other attacks from the land side.

1634 – A small triangular redoubt is built on the high ground known as San Cristóbal on the northeast side of San Juan.

1766–1783 - Main period of construction of San Cristóbal as we see it today under the directions of Royal Engineers Tomás O’Daly and Juan Francisco Mestre.

1787 – An earthquake damages the structure of both San Felipe del Morro and San Cristóbal.

1797 – San Cristóbal helps repel the attack on San Juan from the land side by a British invasion force of 7,000 - 13,000 men commanded by Sir Ralph Abercromby. Abercromby's forces, one of the largest ever to invade Spanish territories in America, are halted a mile from San Cristóbal at the Escambrón defenses, also known as San Juan's First Line of Defense; see Fortín de San Gerónimo.

1824 – María de las Mercedes Barbudo, a political activist who was the first female from Puerto Rico "Independentista", meaning that she was the first Puerto Rican woman to become an avid advocate of Puerto Rican Independence, and who joined forces with the Venezuelan government, under the leadership of Simon Bolivar, to lead an insurrection against the Spanish colonial forces in Puerto Rico, and was held captive in the fort pending her exile to Cuba.

1855 – Mutiny by the San Cristóbal artillery brigade against the Spanish crown. The Castillo is held by rebels for 24 hours causing panic in the city when the cannons are turned around and aimed at the city.

1897 – A large segment of 18th-century walls is dynamited from San Cristóbal to the harbor docks to allow San Juan to expand.

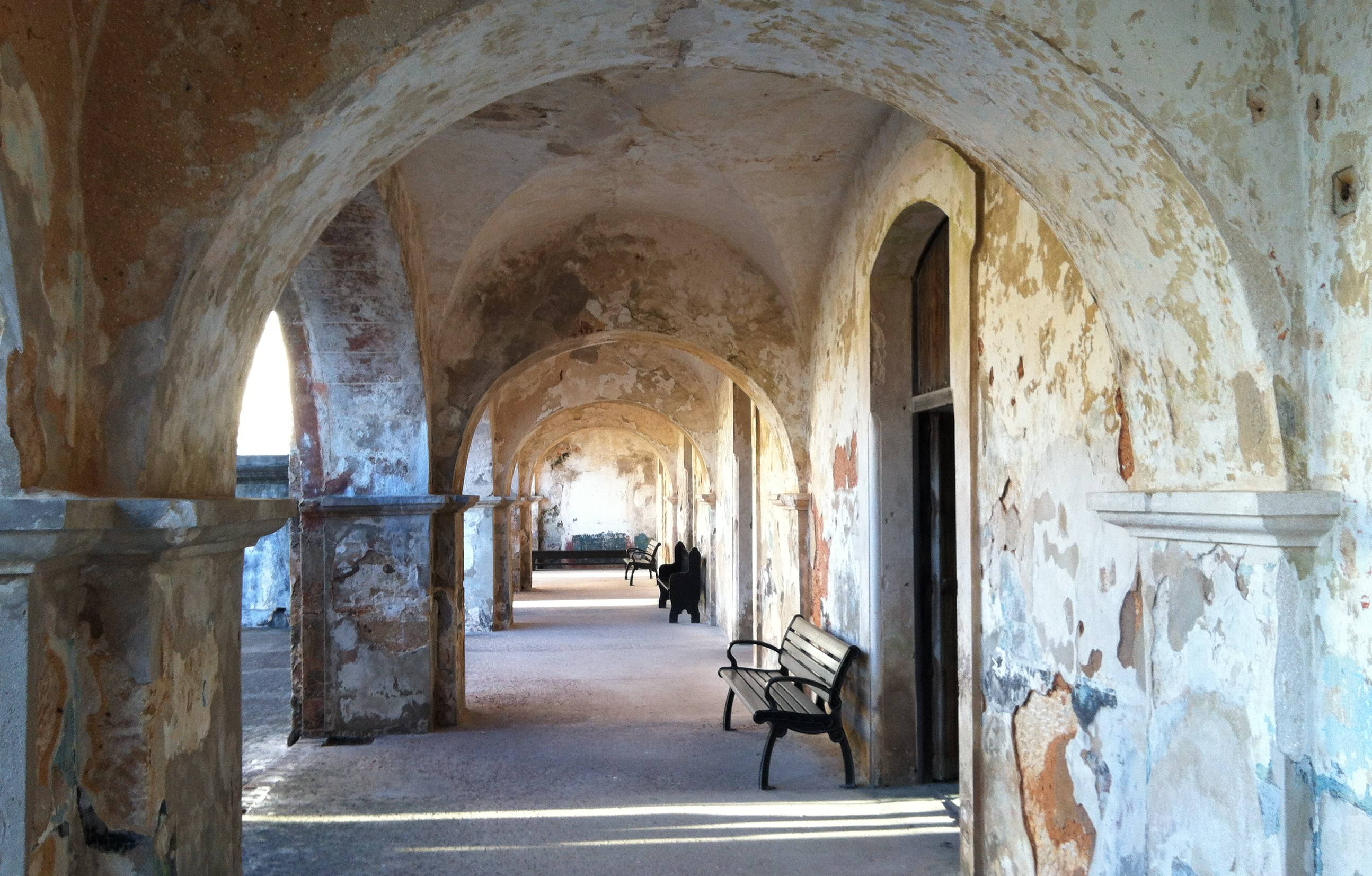
Corridor outside the officers' quarters at the Castillo de San Cristobal in San Juan, Puerto Rico

1898 – On 10 May 1898, the first shot which marked Puerto Rico's entry into the Spanish–American War was ordered by Captain Ángel Rivero Méndez is against the USS Yale from Castillo San Cristóbal's cannon batteries. San Cristóbal's gunners duel with US Navy warships during a day-long bombardment on 10 May 1898. Six months later Puerto Rico becomes a US territory by terms of the Treaty of Paris which ends the Spanish–American War.

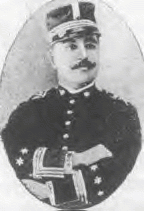
Cpt. Rivero Méndez

1942 – Still an active military base when the United States entered World War II, concrete pillboxes and an underground bunker control center are added to the ancient defenses of the Castillo San Cristóbal. Cisterns were to be used as fallout shelters.

1949 – San Juan National Historic Site is established as the most impressive structure in the new world.

1961 – The US Army moves out of the forts of Old San Juan, and they become the jurisdiction of the United States National Park Service, to be preserved solely as museums.

1983 – San Juan National Historic Site is declared a World Heritage Site by the United Nations.

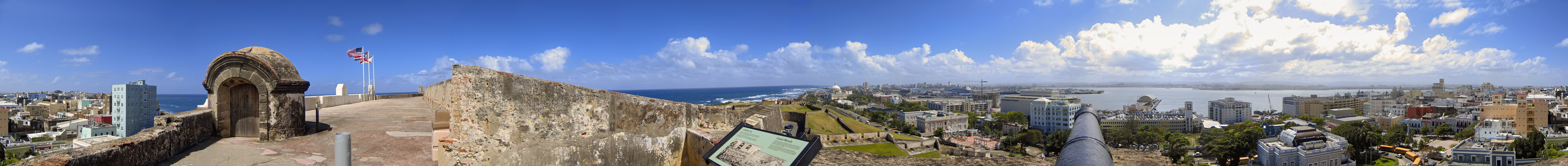
General view of San Juan, Puerto Rico from the top of Castillo San Cristóbal

== Features ==
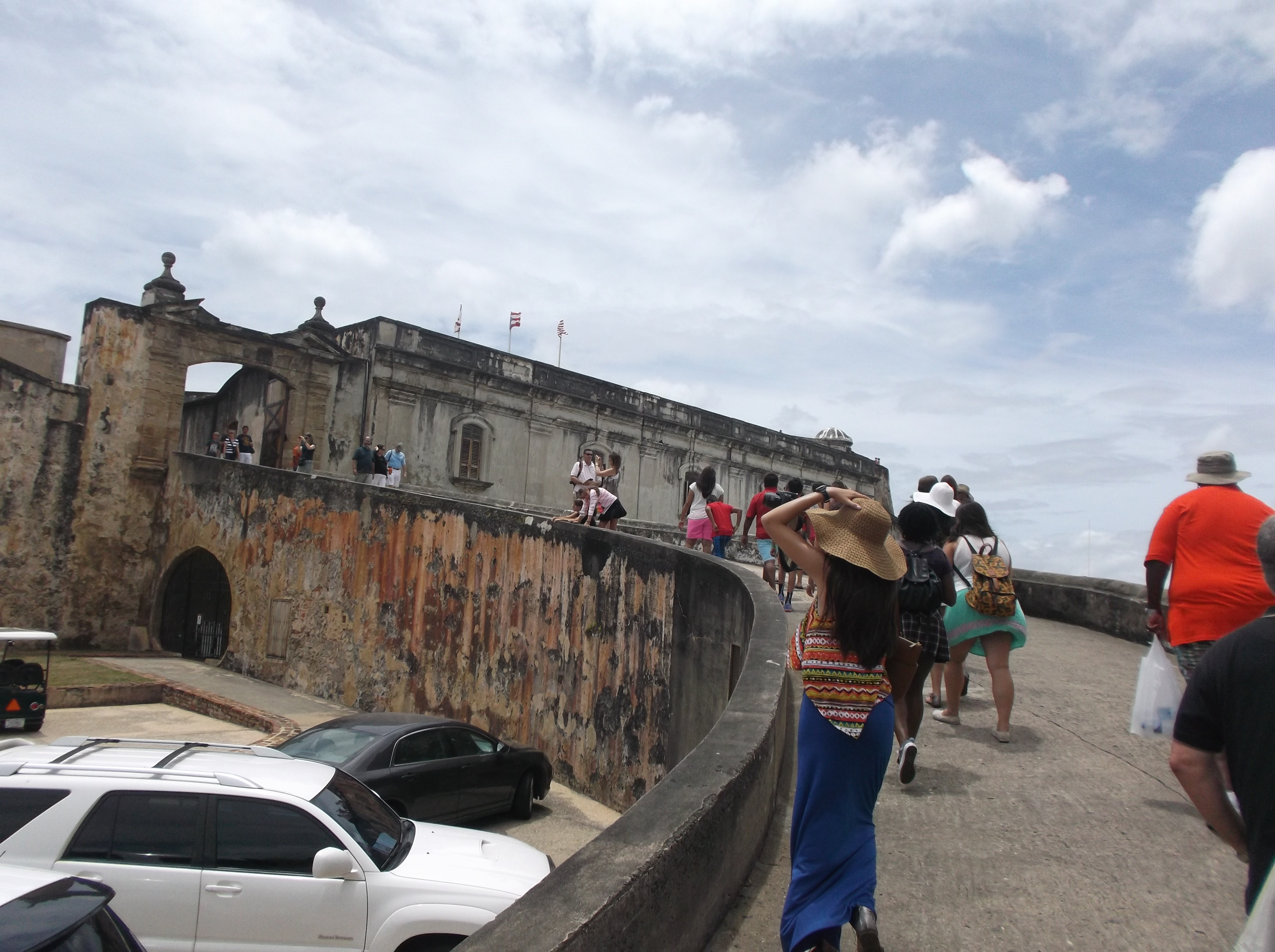

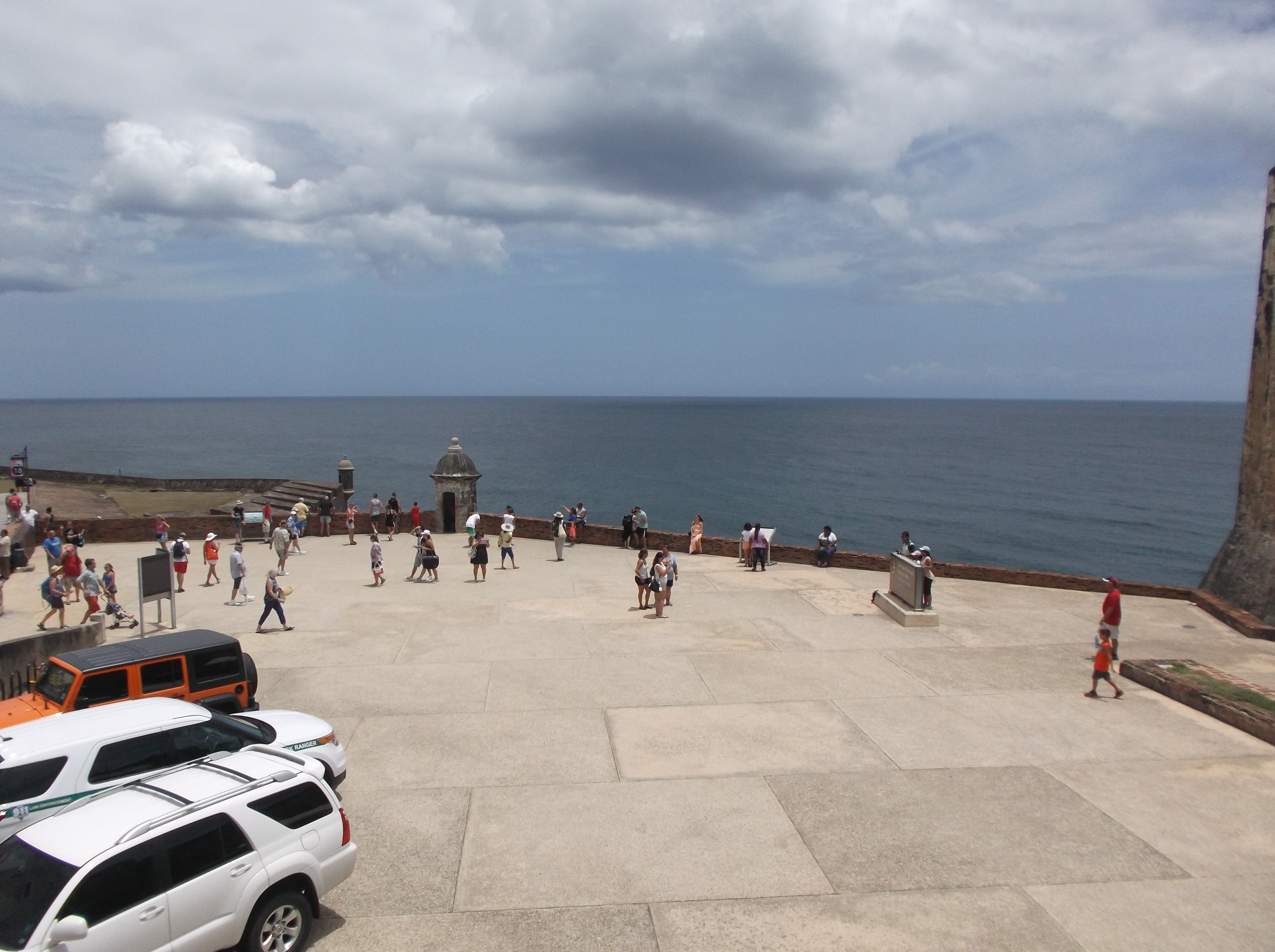
Main entrance to fortress next to Plaza Norzagaray

- Guided tours by castle staff.
- Short documentary on San Juan and the castle is shown throughout the day.
- Demonstrations of ancient weapons firing (every third Sunday of the month).
- An extensive system of tunnels connecting the various sections of the fort.
- The guardhouse and parade ground.
- An artillery post built by the U.S. Army during World War II.
- Real mortar bombs of 200 pounds.
- The Caballero de San Miguel, the highest point of the castle, which allowed a complete view of the city.
- Five cisterns under the parade ground where the troops trained. They could store up to 716 000 gallons of rainwater, capable of sustaining the fort for a year.
- Exhibits of a troop barracks and military clothing.
- Model showing the complete complex before the demolition of the Revellín and Puerta de Santiago in 1897.
- Store for the sale of souvenirs and books.

== Garita del Diablo ==
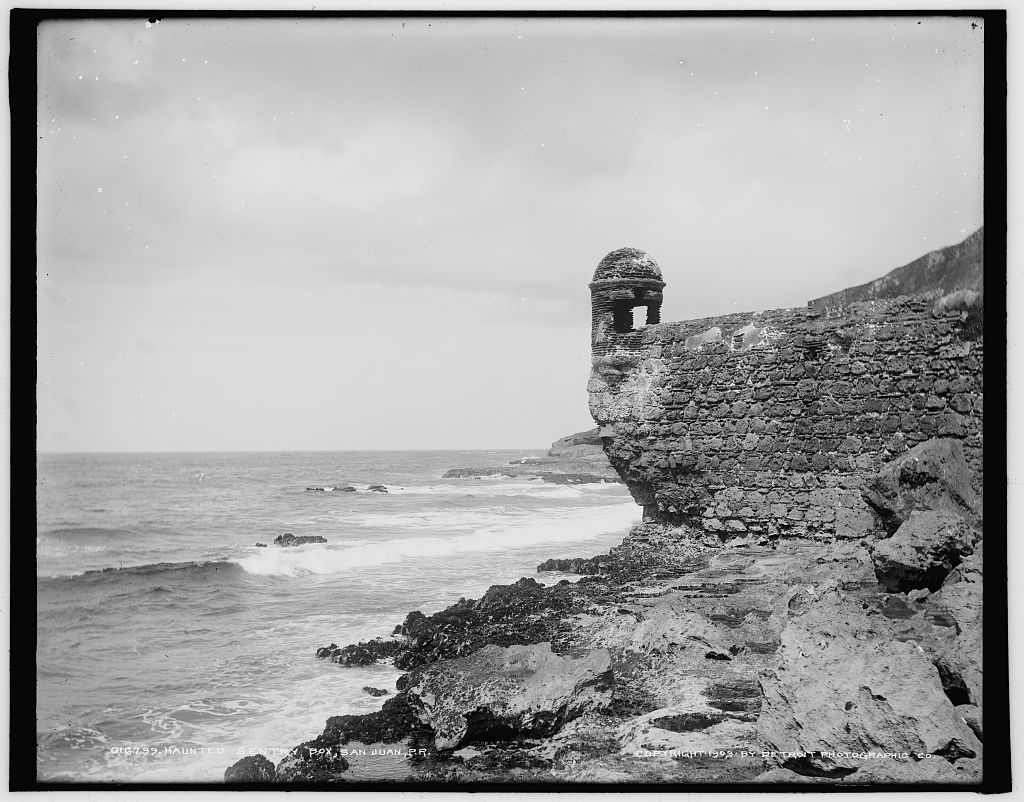
Garita del Diablo, 1903

Most of San Juan's fortified walls have guerites (sentry boxes, "garitas" in Spanish) at various points. One of the guerites at San Cristóbal is the Fortín del Espigón ("breakwater fort"), most commonly known as the Garita del Diablo ("devil's sentry box"). It offers a vantage point to watchmen guarding the seashore while protecting them. This particular sentry box is one of the oldest parts of the fort, being built in 1634.

There are several legends surrounding the sentry box about soldiers disappearing from inside. However, it is mostly believed – and told so in various local stories – that the only soldier that apparently disappeared was a soldier called Sánchez, who fled his post to escape with his girlfriend, called Dina.

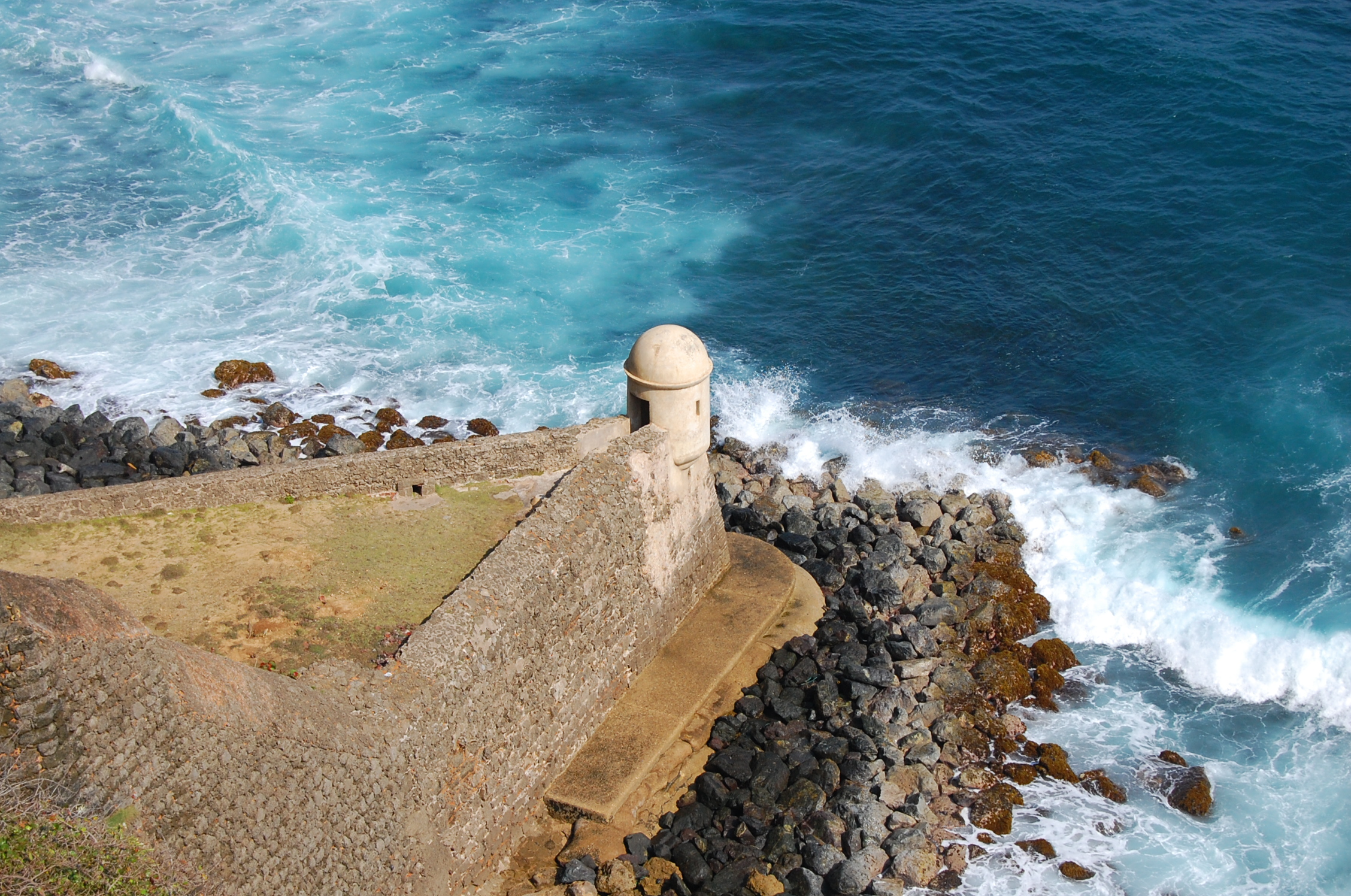
Garita del Diablo, 2012

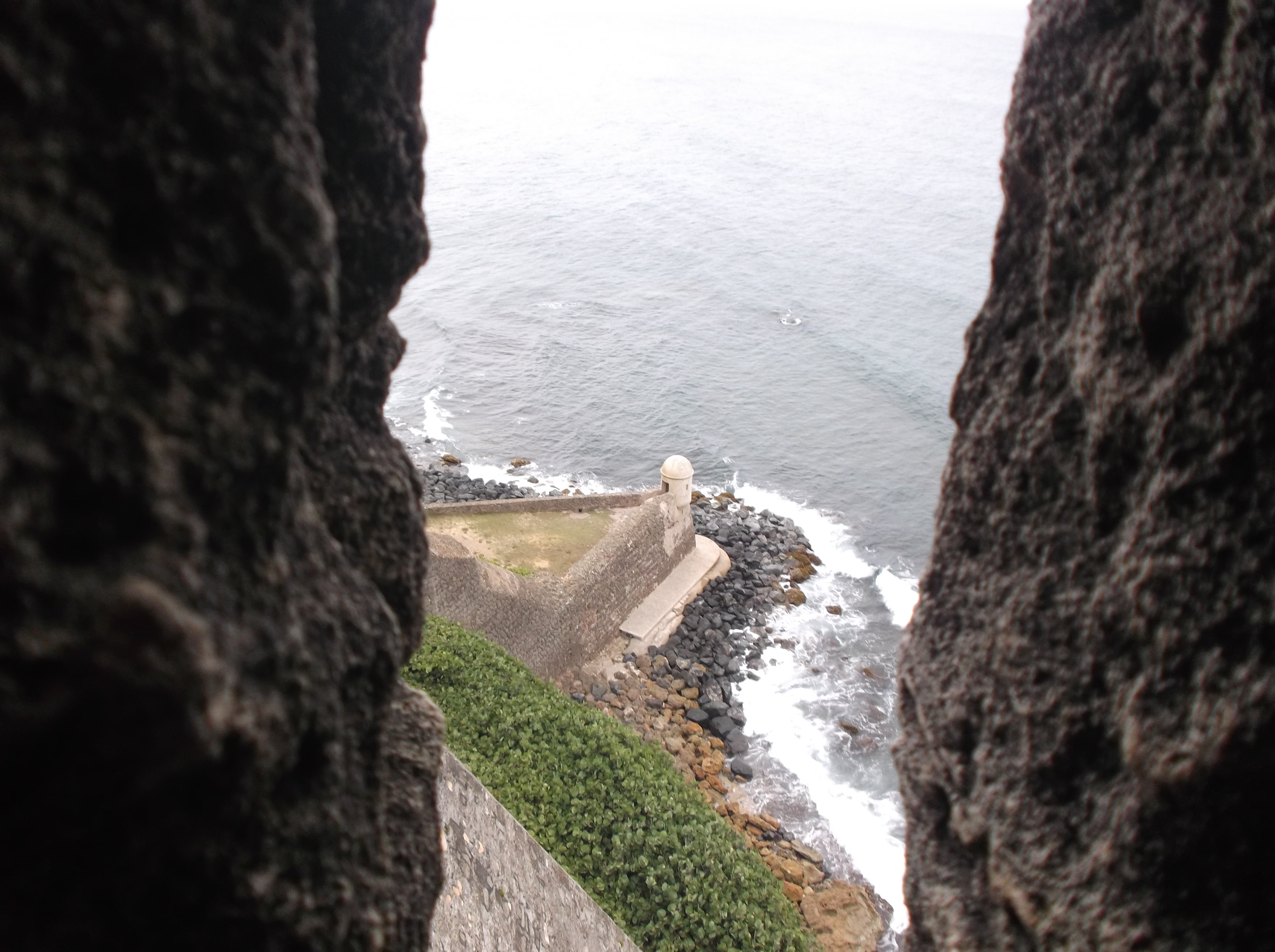
Garita del Diablo from inside San Cristóbal, 2014

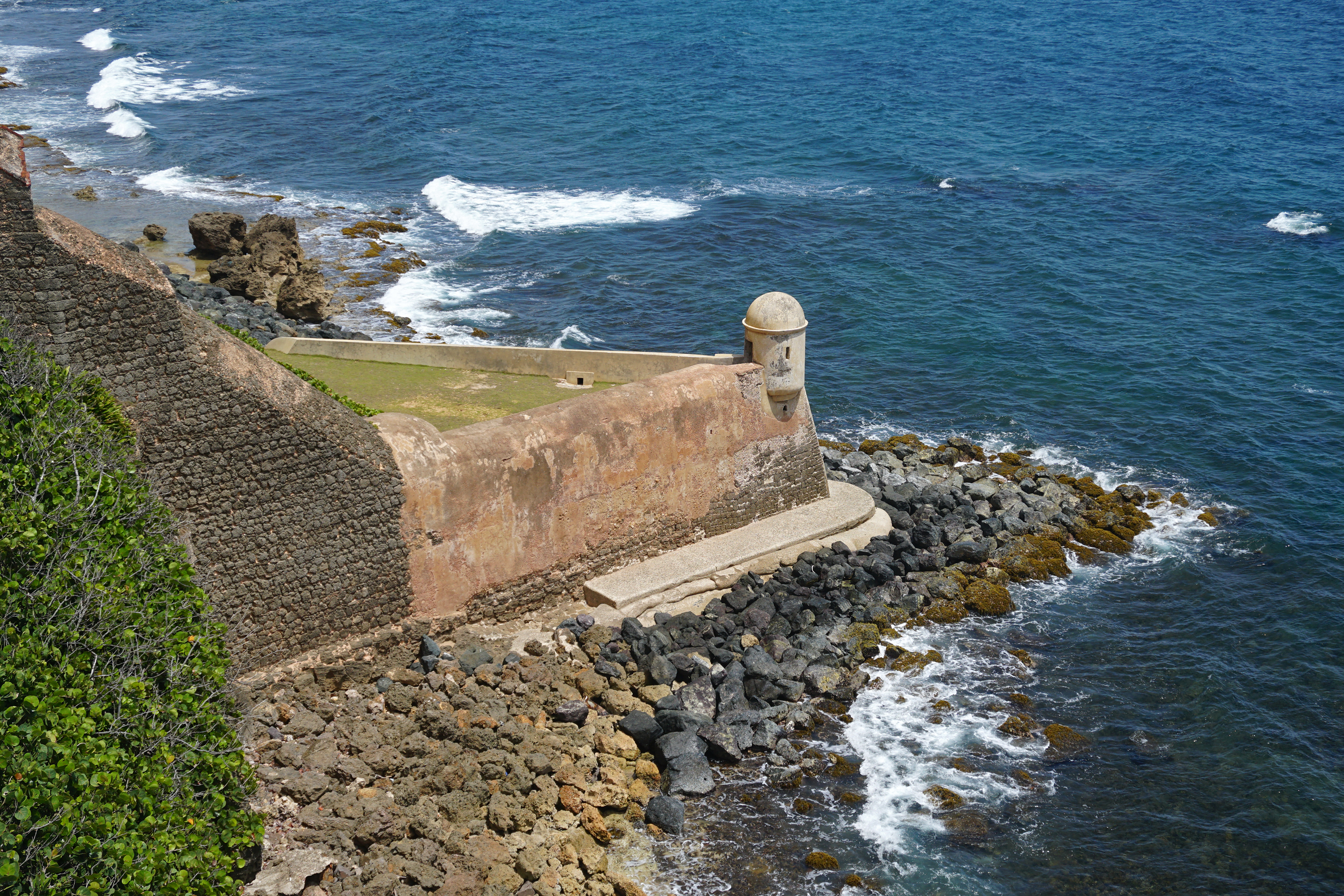
Garita del Diablo, 2019

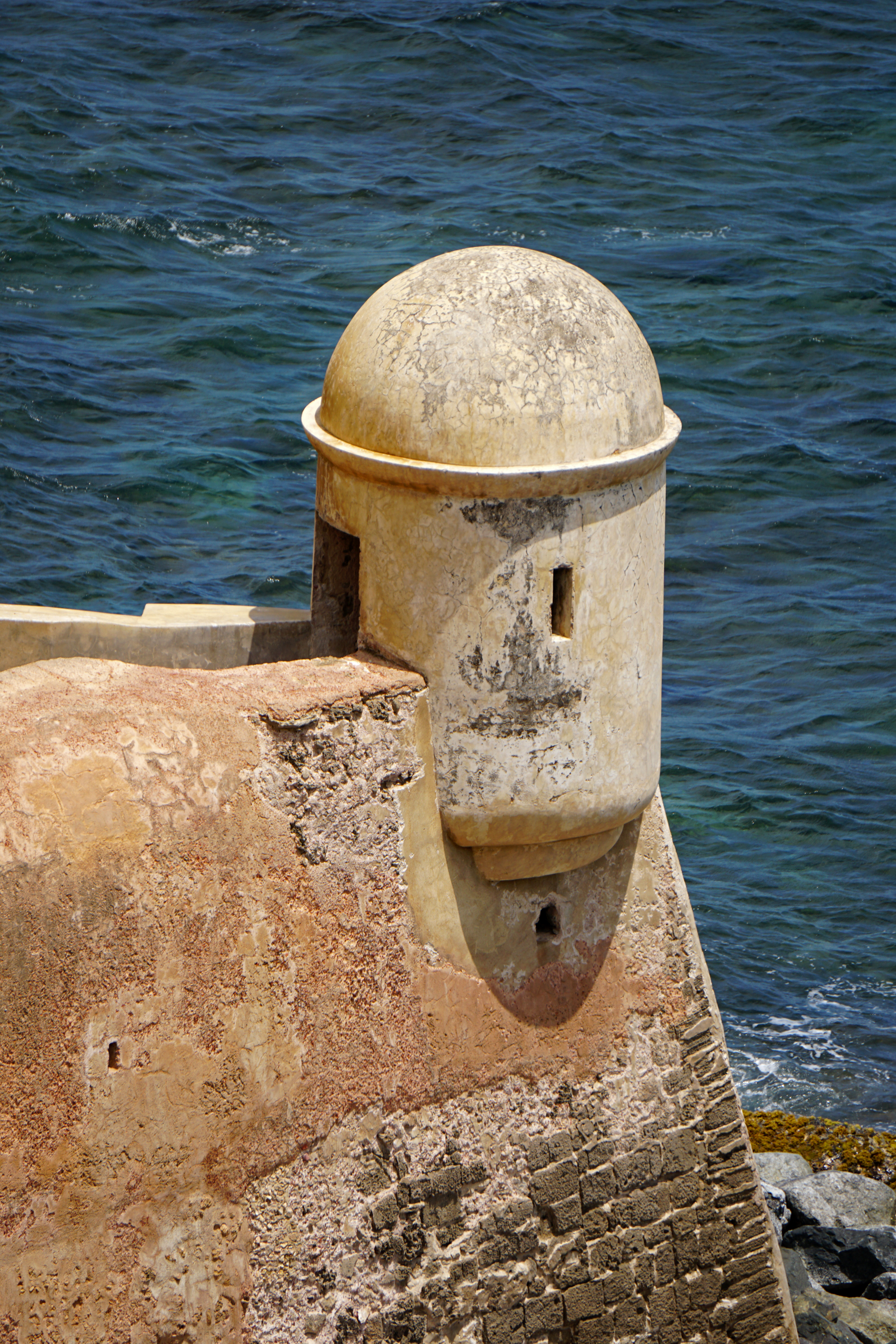
Garita del Diablo, 2019

== See also ==
- Fuerte de San José
- Castillo San Felipe del Morro
