= Couvreface =

Feature in fortification architecture

A : Counterguard B : Couvreface (idealised graphic in which all accompanying works such as moats or glacis have been omitted)

A couvreface in fortification architecture is a small outwork that was built in front of the actual fortress ditch before bastions or ravelins. It usually just consisted of a low rampart with a breastwork that protected its defending infantry. Another ditch in front of the work guarded it from immediate frontal assault. The function of couvrefaces was to protect the faces of the higher ravelin or bastion behind it from direct artillery fire. So that the couvreface and the works behind it could not come under simultaneous fire from an enemy battery along the line of the ramparts they were not allowed to run parallel to one another. Similar to the couvreface is the larger counterguard which, by contrast, was designed to enable the positioning of guns. Couvrefaces are found particularly in Dutch and French fortifications from the 17th to the early 19th centuries.
