= Counterguard =

Outwork in a bastioned fortification system

A : Counterguard B : Couvreface (idealised graphic in which all accompanying works such as moats or glacis have been omitted)

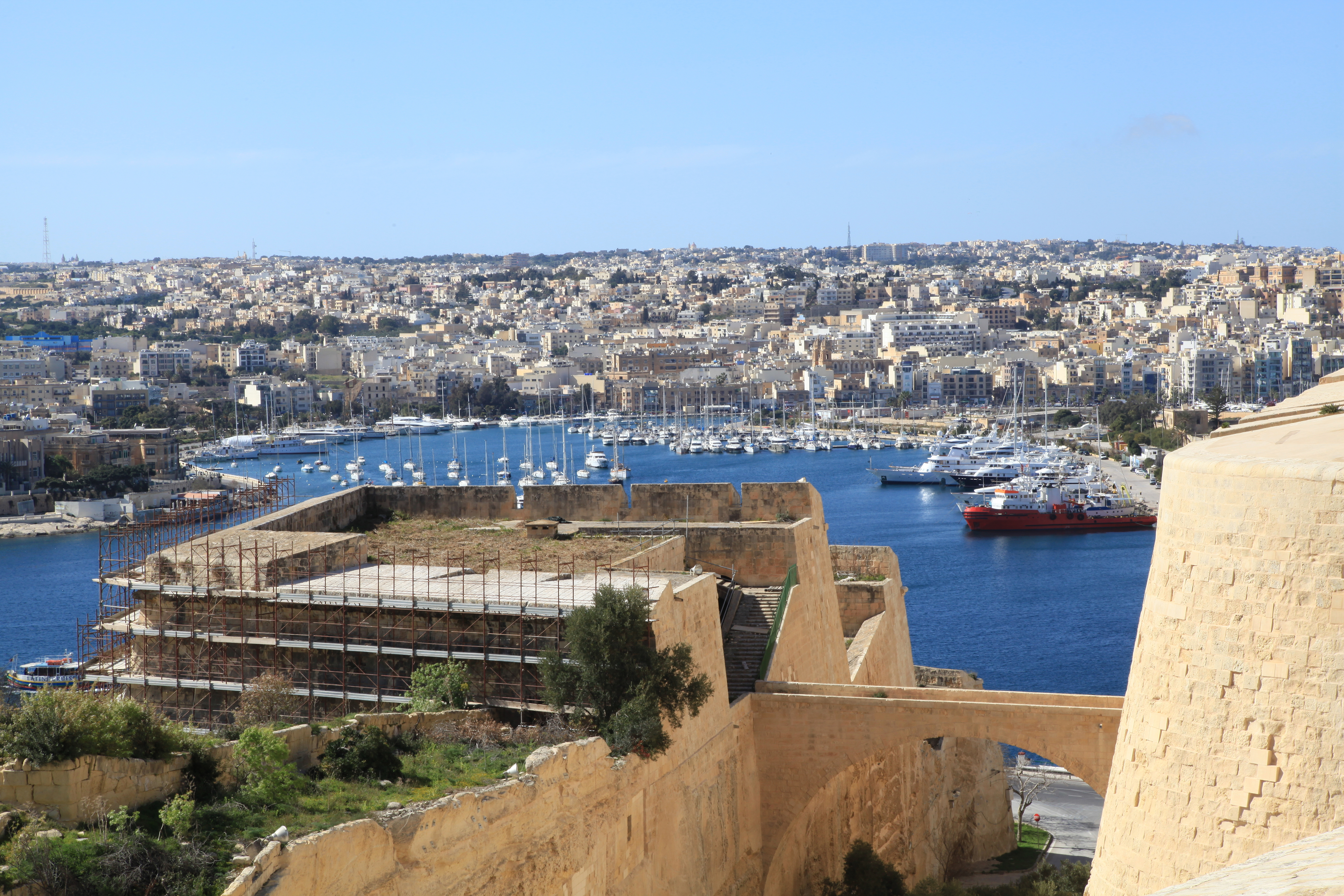
Saint Michael's Counterguard in Valletta, Malta.

The counterguard (German: Kontergarde, French: contre-garde) is an outwork in a bastioned fortification system that usually comprises only a low rampart and which is sited in front of the actual fortress moat that runs around the bastions or ravelins. The rampart way of a counterguard is, however, so constructed and at least wide enough that it enables the positioning of guns. An additional ditch in front of it guards the work from a frontal enemy assault. The function of counterguards was to protect the higher ravelin or bastion behind it from direct fire and to delay an attack on it as long as possible. So that the counterguards and the works that they were to protect could not come under simultaneous fire along the line of the rampart, they were not allowed to run parallel to one another.

If such a rampart work was built for defending infantry alone, i.e. without artillery positions, it was called a couvreface.
